= Diving at the 2015 World Aquatics Championships – Women's 3 metre springboard =

Women's 3 metre springboard at the 2015 World Aquatics Championships
- Dates: 31 July–1 August
- Competitors: 47 from 29 nations
- Winning points: 383.55

Medalists
gold medal	Shi Tingmao	China
silver medal	He Zi	China
bronze medal	Tania Cagnotto	Italy

The Women's 3 metre springboard competition of the diving events at the 2015 World Aquatics Championships was held on 31 July–1 August 2015.

== Results ==
The preliminary round was held on 31 July at 10:00. The semifinal was held on 31 July at 15:00. The final was held on 1 August at 19:30.

Green denotes finalists

Blue denotes semifinalists

Rank	Diver	Nationality	Preliminary		Semifinal		Final	
Rank	Diver	Nationality	Points	Rank	Points	Rank	Points	Rank
1st place, gold medalist(s)	Shi Tingmao	China	368.40	2	381.90	1	383.55	1
2nd place, silver medalist(s)	He Zi	China	376.00	1	371.40	2	377.45	2
3rd place, bronze medalist(s)	Tania Cagnotto	Italy	307.45	7	330.45	5	356.15	3
4	Esther Qin	Australia	329.10	4	345.75	4	347.20	4
5	Pamela Ware	Canada	317.30	5	318.65	6	332.40	5
6	Jennifer Abel	Canada	348.70	3	353.90	3	331.50	6
7	Maddison Keeney	Australia	305.55	9	314.60	7	326.60	7
8	Ng Yan Yee	Malaysia	294.60	12	296.10	11	311.10	8
9	Uschi Freitag	Netherlands	300.40	10	303.55	9	305.10	9
10	Rebecca Gallantree	Great Britain	294.15	13	305.10	8	289.00	10
11	Olena Fedorova	Ukraine	307.20	8	296.10	11	271.30	11
12	Anastasiia Nedobiga	Ukraine	296.25	11	297.45	10	266.10	12
13	Nadezhda Bazhina	Russia	283.90	17	291.30	13		
14	Sayaka Shibusawa	Japan	289.75	14	288.45	14		
15	Nora Subschinski	Germany	282.45	18	280.95	15		
16	Inge Jansen	Netherlands	284.40	16	270.60	16		
17	Francesca Dallapé	Italy	312.50	6	258.25	17		
18	Arantxa Chávez	Mexico	286.95	15	257.10	18		
19	Nur Dhabitah Sabri	Malaysia	276.65	19				
20	Kristina Ilinykh	Russia	267.90	20				
21	Abigail Johnston	United States	267.60	21				
22	Diana Pineda	Colombia	264.90	22				
23	Jessica Favre	Switzerland	264.20	23				
24	Dolores Hernández	Mexico	263.70	24				
25	Laura Ryan	United States	263.10	25				
26	Alicia Blagg	Great Britain	262.55	26				
27	Micaela Bouter	South Africa	258.30	27				
28	Luana Lira	Brazil	255.05	28				
29	Flóra Gondos	Hungary	253.10	29				
30	Tina Punzel	Germany	249.60	30				
31	Daniella Nero	Sweden	246.00	31				
32	Jeniffer Fernández	Puerto Rico	244.70	32				
33	Julia Vincent	South Africa	238.95	33				
34	Kim Su-ji	South Korea	238.60	34				
35	Minami Itahashi	Japan	235.50	35				
36	Elizabeth Cui	New Zealand	233.70	36				
37	Eleni Katsouli	Greece	232.45	37				
38	Marcela Marić	Croatia	228.60	38				
39	Rocío Velázquez	Spain	226.80	39				
40	Luisa Jiménez	Puerto Rico	221.25	40				
41	Habiba Ashraf	Egypt	215.65	41				
42	Indrė Girdauskaitė	Lithuania	214.55	42				
43	Juliana Veloso	Brazil	213.75	43				
44	Fong Kay Yian	Singapore	206.20	44				
45	Maha Abdelsalam	Egypt	198.10	45				
46	María Betancourt	Venezuela	193.05	46				
47	Kim Na-mi	South Korea	112.25	47				
