= Diving at the 2015 World Aquatics Championships – Women's 1 metre springboard =

Women's 1 metre springboard at the 2015 World Aquatics Championships
- Dates: 26–28 July
- Competitors: 37 from 23 nations
- Winning points: 310.85

Medalists
gold medal	Tania Cagnotto	Italy
silver medal	Shi Tingmao	China
bronze medal	He Zi	China

The Women's 1 metre springboard competition of the diving events at the 2015 World Aquatics Championships was held on 26 and 28 July 2015.

== Results ==
The preliminary round was held on 26 July at 15:00. The final was held on 28 July at 15:00.

Green denotes finalists

Rank	Diver	Nationality	Preliminary		Final	
Rank	Diver	Nationality	Points	Rank	Points	Rank
1st place, gold medalist(s)	Tania Cagnotto	Italy	291.25	2	310.85	1
2nd place, silver medalist(s)	Shi Tingmao	China	307.35	1	309.20	2
3rd place, bronze medalist(s)	He Zi	China	285.40	3	300.30	3
4	Olena Fedorova	Ukraine	257.55	7	286.95	4
5	Esther Qin	Australia	261.60	6	280.50	5
6	Nadezhda Bazhina	Russia	252.05	8	273.45	6
7	Nora Subschinski	Germany	248.10	10	265.25	7
8	Kim Su-ji	South Korea	247.10	11	258.50	8
9	Maria Polyakova	Russia	275.15	5	255.20	9
10	Inge Jansen	Netherlands	248.50	9	244.10	10
11	Dolores Hernández	Mexico	242.75	12	241.90	11
12	Maddison Keeney	Australia	283.40	4	226.05	12
13	Kim Na-mi	South Korea	241.10	13		
14	Diana Pineda	Colombia	241.05	14		
15	Daniella Nero	Sweden	239.95	15		
16	Alena Khamulkina	Belarus	237.90	16		
17	Samantha Pickens	United States	237.90	17		
18	Hanna Pysmenska	Ukraine	237.70	18		
19	Arantxa Chávez	Mexico	236.95	19		
20	Iira Laatunen	Finland	229.65	20		
21	Julia Vincent	South Africa	229.15	21		
22	Micaela Bouter	South Africa	227.50	22		
23	Taina Karvonen	Finland	227.30	23		
24	Elizabeth Cui	New Zealand	227.05	24		
25	Juliana Veloso	Brazil	226.90	25		
26	Uschi Freitag	Netherlands	215.75	26		
27	Jessica Favre	Switzerland	213.65	27		
28	Louisa Stawczynski	Germany	212.95	28		
29	Elena Bertocchi	Italy	208.40	29		
30	Rocío Velázquez	Spain	204.00	30		
31	Maha Abdelsalam	Egypt	203.45	31		
32	Habiba Ashraf	Egypt	201.65	32		
33	María Betancourt	Venezuela	201.65	33		
34	Indrė Girdauskaitė	Lithuania	197.50	34		
35	Maja Borić	Croatia	195.60	35		
36	Marcela Marić	Croatia	183.30	36		
37	Luana Lira	Brazil	180.35	37		
