= Synchronised swimming at the 2015 World Aquatics Championships – Duet free routine =

Duet free routine at the 2015 World Aquatics Championships
- Dates: 28–30 July
- Competitors: 74 from 37 nations
- Winning points: 98.2000

Medalists
gold medal	Natalia Ishchenko; Svetlana Romashina	Russia
silver medal	Huang Xuechen; Sun Wenyan	China
bronze medal	Lolita Ananasova; Anna Voloshyna	Ukraine

The Duet free routine competition of the synchronised swimming events at the 2015 World Aquatics Championships was held on 28 and 30 July 2015.

== Results ==
The preliminary round was held on 28 July at 09:00. The final was held on 30 July at 17:30.

Green denotes finalists

Rank	Nation	Swimmers	Preliminary		Final	
Rank	Nation	Swimmers	Points	Rank	Points	Rank
1st place, gold medalist(s)	Russia	Natalia Ishchenko; Svetlana Romashina	97.2667	1	98.2000	1
2nd place, silver medalist(s)	China	Huang Xuechen; Sun Wenyan	95.4667	2	95.9000	2
3rd place, bronze medalist(s)	Ukraine	Lolita Ananasova; Anna Voloshyna	93.0333	4	93.6000	3
4	Japan	Yukiko Inui; Risako Mitsui	93.5333	3	93.4333	4
5	Spain	Ona Carbonell; Paula Klamburg	91.7000	5	92.2333	5
6	Italy	Linda Cerruti; Costanza Ferro	90.2000	6	90.9667	6
7	Canada	Jacqueline Simoneau; Karine Thomas	89.6000	7	89.3667	7
8	France	Laura Augé; Margaux Chrétien	86.6667	8	87.3667	8
9	Greece	Evangelia Papazoglou; Evangelia Platanioti	84.8000	10	85.8333	9
10	Mexico	Karem Achach; Nuria Diosdado	85.7000	9	85.5333	10
11	United States	Anita Alvarez; Mariya Koroleva	84.4333	11	84.9667	11
12	Brazil	Luisa Borges; Maria Eduarda Miccuci	84.2000	12	84.4667	12
13	Austria	Anna-Maria Alexandri; Eirini Alexandri	83.9000	13		
14	North Korea	Kang Un-ha; Kim Un-a	83.5667	14		
15	Czech Republic	Soňa Bernardová; Alžběta Dufková	82.4000	15		
16	Switzerland	Sophie Giger; Sascia Kraus	82.2000	16		
17	Argentina	Etel Sánchez; Sofía Sánchez	79.9667	17		
18	Belarus	Iryna Limanouskaya; Veronika Yesipovich	79.9000	18		
19	Israel	Anastasia Gloushkov; Ievgeniia Tetelbaum	79.8333	19		
20	Colombia	Estefanía Álvarez; Mónica Arango	79.1667	20		
21	Uzbekistan	Yuliya Kim; Anastasiya Ruzmetova	77.5000	21		
22	Egypt	Samia Ahmed; Dara Hassanien	77.0667	22		
23	Slovakia	Naďa Daabousová; Jana Labáthová	76.9333	23		
24	Great Britain	Jodie Cowie; Genevieve Randall	76.0333	24		
25	Croatia	Rebecca Domika; Mia Šestan	76.0000	25		
26	Turkey	Defne Bakırcı; Mısra Gündeş	75.1667	26		
27	Aruba	Anouk Eman; Kyra Hoevertsz	74.8000	27		
28	Chile	Kelley Kobler; Natalie Lubascher	74.2000	28		
29	Venezuela	Oriana Carrillo; Greisy Gómez	73.2667	29		
30	Australia	Bianca Hammett; Nikita Pablo	73.1667	30		
31	South Korea	Uhm Ji-wan; Won Ji-soo	71.9333	31		
32	Bulgaria	Hristina Damyanova; Zlatina Dimitrova	71.8667	32		
33	Portugal	Barbara Costa; Diana Gomes	69.3333	33		
34	Costa Rica	Fiorella Calvo; Natalia Jenkins	68.5667	34		
35	Cuba	Yanela Chacón; Odailys Suárez	66.0000	35		
35	South Africa	Emma Manners-Wood; Laura Strugnell	66.0000	35		
37	Hong Kong	Cho Man Yee Nora; Pang Ho Yan	65.5333	37		
