= Switzerland at the 2015 World Aquatics Championships =

- Flag of Switzerland
- World Aquatics code: SUI
- National federation: Schweizerischer Schwimmverband
- Website: www.fsn.ch

in Kazan, Russia
- Competitors: 28 in 3 sports
- Medals: Gold 0 Silver 0 Bronze 0 Total 0

World Aquatics Championships appearances
- 1973; 1975; 1978; 1982; 1986; 1991; 1994; 1998; 2001; 2003; 2005; 2007; 2009; 2011; 2013; 2015; 2017; 2019; 2022; 2023; 2024; 2025

Switzerland competed at the 2015 World Aquatics Championships in Kazan, Russia from 24 July to 9 August 2015.

== Diving ==
Swiss divers qualified for the individual spots at the World Championships.

Men

Athlete	Event	Preliminaries		Semifinals		Final	
Athlete	Event	Points	Rank	Points	Rank	Points	Rank
Guillaume Dutoit	1 m springboard	311.55	23	—N/a		did not advance	
Guillaume Dutoit	3 m springboard	399.45	25	did not advance			

Women

Athlete	Event	Preliminaries		Semifinals		Final	
Athlete	Event	Points	Rank	Points	Rank	Points	Rank
Jessica Favré	1 m springboard	213.65	27	—N/a		did not advance	
Jessica Favré	3 m springboard	264.20	23	did not advance			

Mixed

Athlete	Event	Final	
Athlete	Event	Points	Rank
Guillaume Dutoit; Jessica Favré	3 m synchronized springboard	284.34	10

== Swimming ==
Swiss swimmers have achieved qualifying standards in the following events (up to a maximum of 2 swimmers in each event at the A-standard entry time, and 1 at the B-standard):

Men

Athlete	Event	Heat		Semifinal		Final	
Athlete	Event	Time	Rank	Time	Rank	Time	Rank
Jérémy Desplanches	200 m individual medley	1:59.46	10 Q	1:59.35	12	did not advance	
Jérémy Desplanches	400 m individual medley	4:17.90	16	—N/a		did not advance	
Jean-Baptiste Febo	400 m freestyle	3:54.47	44	—N/a		did not advance	
Alexandre Haldemann	200 m freestyle	1:48.49	26	did not advance			
Yannick Käser	100 m breaststroke	1:00.94	26	did not advance			
Yannick Käser	200 m breaststroke	2:11.65	18	did not advance			
Nils Liess	200 m butterfly	1:58.76	24	did not advance			
Lukas Räuftlin	100 m backstroke	56.11	39	did not advance			
Lukas Räuftlin	200 m backstroke	2:03.00	29	did not advance			
Martin Schweizer	50 m breaststroke	28.02	26	did not advance			
Nico van Duijn	100 m butterfly	52.94	29	did not advance			
Alexandre Haldemann; Nils Liess; Jean-Baptiste Febo; Nico van Duijn	4 × 100 m freestyle relay	3:22.61	24	—N/a		did not advance	
Alexandre Haldemann; Nils Liess; Jérémy Desplanches; Jean-Baptiste Febo	4 × 200 m freestyle relay	7:17.99	16	—N/a		did not advance	
Nils Liess; Yannick Käser; Nico van Duijn; Alexandre Haldemann	4 × 100 m medley relay	3:38.94	17	—N/a		did not advance	

Women

Athlete	Event	Heat		Semifinal		Final	
Athlete	Event	Time	Rank	Time	Rank	Time	Rank
Sasha Touretski	50 m freestyle	25.49	=26	did not advance			
Sasha Touretski	100 m freestyle	56.20	37	did not advance			
Martina van Berkel	400 m freestyle	4:15.83	27	—N/a		did not advance	
Martina van Berkel	200 m backstroke	2:14.99	29	did not advance			
Martina van Berkel	200 m butterfly	2:09.88	17	did not advance			
Martina van Berkel	400 m individual medley	4:51.79	29	—N/a		did not advance	
Danielle Villars	200 m freestyle	2:01.03	34	did not advance			
Danielle Villars	100 m butterfly	59.21	27	did not advance			
Maria Ugolkova; Sasha Touretski; Danielle Villars; Noemi Girardet	4 × 100 m freestyle relay	3:43.70	15	—N/a		did not advance	
Danielle Villars; Noemi Girardet; Martina van Berkel; Maria Ugolkova	4 × 200 m freestyle relay	8:08.59	15	—N/a		did not advance	

Mixed

Athlete	Event	Heat		Final	
Athlete	Event	Time	Rank	Time	Rank
Lukas Räuftlin; Jean-Baptiste Febo; Noemi Girardet; Maria Ugolkova	4 × 100 m freestyle relay	3:34.72	14	did not advance	
Nils Liess; Martin Schweizer; Danielle Villars; Megan Connor	4 × 100 m medley relay	3:53.56	10	did not advance	

== Synchronized swimming ==
Switzerland fielded a full team of twelve synchronized swimmers to compete in each of the following events.

Athlete	Event	Preliminaries		Final	
Athlete	Event	Points	Rank	Points	Rank
Sascia Kraus	Solo technical routine	78.5041	15	did not advance	
Sascia Kraus	Solo free routine	80.8333	14	did not advance	
Sophie Giger; Sascia Kraus	Duet technical routine	80.1645	17	did not advance	
Sophie Giger; Sascia Kraus	Duet free routine	82.2000	16	did not advance	
Maxence Bellina; Aicha El Mehrek; Sophie Giger; Gladys Jaccard*; Mélanie Nippel; Michelle Nydegger; Joelle Peschl; Maria Piffaretti; Manuela Rihm*; Flavia Rumasuglia	Team technical routine	79.3083	15	did not advance	
Maxence Bellina*; Aicha El Mehrek; Sophie Giger; Gladys Jaccard; Mélanie Nippel; Michelle Nydegger; Joelle Peschl; Maria Piffaretti*; Manuela Rihm; Flavia Rumasuglia	Team free routine	79.6667	14	did not advance	
Maxence Bellina*; Aicha El Mehrek; Sophie Giger; Gladys Jaccard; Sascia Kraus; Mélanie Nippel; Michelle Nydegger; Joelle Peschl; Maria Piffaretti*; Manuela Rihm; Pauline Rosselet; Flavia Rumasuglia	Free routine combination	81.6000	13	did not advance	
