= Switzerland at the 2013 World Aquatics Championships =

- Flag of Switzerland
- World Aquatics code: SUI
- National federation: Schweizerischer Schwimmverband
- Website: www.fsn.ch

in Barcelona, Spain
- Competitors: 16 in 3 sports
- Medals: Gold 0 Silver 0 Bronze 0 Total 0

World Aquatics Championships appearances
- 1973; 1975; 1978; 1982; 1986; 1991; 1994; 1998; 2001; 2003; 2005; 2007; 2009; 2011; 2013; 2015; 2017; 2019; 2022; 2023; 2024; 2025

Switzerland is competing at the 2013 World Aquatics Championships in Barcelona, Spain between 19 July and 4 August 2013.

== Open water swimming ==
Switzerland qualified a single quota in open water swimming.

Athlete	Event	Time	Rank
Swann Oberson	Women's 5 km	57:26.8	23

== Swimming ==
Swiss swimmers achieved qualifying standards in the following events (up to a maximum of 2 swimmers in each event at the A-standard entry time, and 1 at the B-standard):

Men

Athlete	Event	Heat		Semifinal		Final	
Athlete	Event	Time	Rank	Time	Rank	Time	Rank
Dominik Meichtry	200 m freestyle	1:50.24	35	did not advance			
Dominik Meichtry	400 m freestyle	3:57.65	34	—		did not advance	
Dominik Meichtry	100 m butterfly	53.96	32	did not advance			
Lukas Räuftlin	100 m backstroke	56.11	28	did not advance			
Lukas Räuftlin	200 m backstroke	2:00.45	20	did not advance			
Martin Schweizer	50 m breaststroke	28.01	31	did not advance			
Martin Schweizer	100 m breaststroke	1:01.64	32	did not advance			

== Synchronized swimming ==
Switzerland has qualified twelve synchronized swimmers.

Athlete	Event	Preliminaries		Final	
Athlete	Event	Points	Rank	Points	Rank
Pamela Fischer	Solo free routine	82.840	14	did not advance	
Pamela Fischer	Solo technical routine	83.400	=13 Q	82.700	14
Pamela Fischer; Anja Nyffeler	Duet free routine	83.370	12 Q	83.030	12
Pamela Fischer; Anja Nyffeler	Duet technical routine	82.000	14 Q	82.300	14
Pamela Fischer; Sophie Giger; Sascia Kraus; Anja Nyffeler; Sara Nyffeler; Kristel Oeschger; Isabelle Quinche; Désireé Widmer*; Giordana Widmer; Matilda Wunderlin*	Team free routine	82.290	12 Q	82.680	12
Pamela Fischer; Sophie Giger; Sascia Kraus; Mélanie Nippel*; Anja Nyffeler; Sara Nyfeller*; Kristel Oeschger; Isabelle Quinche; Flavia Rumasuglia; Désireé Widmer; Giordana Widmer; Matilda Wunderlin	Free routine combination	82.420	12 Q	82.310	11
