= Synchronised swimming at the 2015 World Aquatics Championships – Solo technical routine =

Solo technical routine at the 2015 World Aquatics Championships
- Dates: 25 July
- Competitors: 24 from 24 nations
- Winning points: 95.2680

Medalists
gold medal	Svetlana Romashina	Russia
silver medal	Ona Carbonell	Spain
bronze medal	Sun Wenyan	China

The Solo technical routine competition of the synchronised swimming events at the 2015 World Aquatics Championships was held on 25 July 2015.

== Results ==
The preliminary round was held at 09:00. The final was held at 17:30.

Green denotes finalists

Rank	Swimmers	Nationality	Preliminary		Final	
Rank	Swimmers	Nationality	Points	Rank	Points	Rank
1st place, gold medalist(s)	Svetlana Romashina	Russia	94.3860	1	95.2680	1
2nd place, silver medalist(s)	Ona Carbonell	Spain	91.4408	2	93.1284	2
3rd place, bronze medalist(s)	Sun Wenyan	China	91.3262	3	91.5479	3
4	Anna Voloshyna	Ukraine	90.0364	4	90.8912	4
5	Yukiko Inui	Japan	89.5851	5	90.7603	5
6	Jacqueline Simoneau	Canada	88.0766	6	89.0237	6
7	Linda Cerruti	Italy	86.2072	7	86.2559	7
8	Evangelia Platanioti	Greece	84.9694	8	85.3727	8
9	Mary Killman	United States	82.9311	10	84.5857	9
10	Anastasia Gloushkov	Israel	82.9353	9	84.3204	10
11	Kang Un-ha	North Korea	80.2460	12	83.0956	11
12	Estel-Anaïs Hubaud	France	82.6548	11	83.0030	12
13	Soňa Bernardová	Czech Republic	80.0377	13		
14	Nadine Brandl	Austria	79.4713	14		
15	Sascia Kraus	Switzerland	78.5041	15		
16	Etel Sánchez	Argentina	78.2419	16		
17	Eszter Czékus	Hungary	76.5992	17		
18	Marlene Bojer	Germany	76.2452	18		
19	Reem Abdalazem	Egypt	74.2780	19		
20	Hristina Damyanova	Bulgaria	72.8160	20		
21	Uhm Ji-wan	South Korea	70.6077	21		
22	Karla Loaiza	Venezuela	70.1050	22		
23	Cristy Alfonso	Cuba	66.8716	23		
24	Kerry Norden	South Africa	61.7306	24		
