= Synchronised swimming at the 2015 World Aquatics Championships – Solo free routine =

Solo free routine at the 2015 World Aquatics Championships
- Dates: 27–29 July
- Competitors: 27 from 27 nations
- Winning points: 97.2333

Medalists
gold medal	Natalia Ishchenko	Russia
silver medal	Huang Xuechen	China
bronze medal	Ona Carbonell	Spain

The Solo free routine competition of the synchronised swimming events at the 2015 World Aquatics Championships was held on 27 and 29 July 2015.

== Results ==
The preliminary round was held on 27 July at 09:00. The final was held on 29 July at 17:30.

Green denotes finalists

Rank	Swimmers	Nationality	Preliminary		Final	
Rank	Swimmers	Nationality	Points	Rank	Points	Rank
1st place, gold medalist(s)	Natalia Ishchenko	Russia	96.5000	1	97.2333	1
2nd place, silver medalist(s)	Huang Xuechen	China	95.2000	2	95.7000	2
3rd place, bronze medalist(s)	Ona Carbonell	Spain	94.5000	3	94.9000	3
4	Anna Voloshyna	Ukraine	92.5333	4	93.1333	4
5	Yukiko Inui	Japan	91.7333	5	92.4333	5
6	Jacqueline Simoneau	Canada	89.8000	6	90.2333	6
7	Linda Cerruti	Italy	88.5000	7	89.2000	7
8	Margaux Chrétien	France	85.6667	10	86.6000	8
9	Mary Killman	United States	86.8000	8	86.6000	9
10	Evangelia Platanioti	Greece	86.7000	9	86.3333	10
11	Anastasia Gloushkov	Israel	85.4000	11	85.3000	11
12	Kang Un-ha	North Korea	83.4333	12	83.7000	12
13	Nadine Brandl	Austria	82.6667	13		
14	Sascia Kraus	Switzerland	80.8333	14		
15	Etel Sánchez	Argentina	79.7000	15		
16	Eszter Czékus	Hungary	79.4000	16		
17	Marlene Bojer	Germany	77.0667	17		
18	Rebecca Domika	Croatia	76.9667	18		
19	Reem Abdalazem	Egypt	76.1667	19		
20	María Villasena	Venezuela	74.2333	20		
21	Defne Bakırcı	Turkey	73.4667	21		
22	Lee Lee Yhing Huey	Malaysia	73.0333	22		
23	Uhm Ji-wan	South Korea	72.5000	23		
24	Daniela Bozadzhieva	Bulgaria	72.3000	24		
25	Cho Man Yee Nora	Hong Kong	69.2333	25		
26	Cristy Alfonso	Cuba	68.3667	26		
27	Kerry Norden	South Africa	65.6667	27		
