= South Africa at the 2015 World Aquatics Championships =

- Flag of South Africa
- FINA code: RSA
- National federation: Swimming South Africa
- Website: www.swimsa.co.za

in Kazan, Russia
- Competitors: 43 in 5 sports
- Medals Ranked 11th: Gold 2 Silver 3 Bronze 0 Total 5

World Aquatics Championships appearances
- 1973; 1975; 1978; 1982; 1986; 1991; 1994; 1998; 2001; 2003; 2005; 2007; 2009; 2011; 2013; 2015; 2017; 2019; 2022; 2023; 2024

South Africa competed at the 2015 World Aquatics Championships in Kazan, Russia from 24 July to 9 August 2015.

== Medalists ==
Medal	Name	Sport	Event	Date
Gold	Chad Ho	Open water swimming	Men's 5 km	July 25
Gold	Chad le Clos	Swimming	Men's 100 m butterfly	August 8
Silver	Cameron van der Burgh	Swimming	Men's 100 m breaststroke	August 3
Silver	Cameron van der Burgh	Swimming	Men's 50 m breaststroke	August 5
Silver	Chad le Clos	Swimming	Men's 200 m butterfly	August 5

== Diving ==
South African divers qualified for the individual spots and the synchronized teams at the World Championships.

Women

Athlete	Event	Preliminaries		Semifinals		Final	
Athlete	Event	Points	Rank	Points	Rank	Points	Rank
Micaela Bouter	1 m springboard	227.50	22	—		did not advance	
Julia Vincent	1 m springboard	229.15	21	—		did not advance	
Micaela Bouter	3 m springboard	258.30	27	did not advance			
Julia Vincent	3 m springboard	238.95	33	did not advance			
Jaimee Gundry	10 m platform	245.60	34	did not advance			
Nicola Gillis; Julia Vincent	3 m synchronized springboard	237.93	15	—		did not advance	

== Open water swimming ==
South Africa has fielded a team of six swimmers to compete in the open water marathon.

Men

Athlete	Event	Time	Rank
Chad Ho	5 km	55:17.6	1st place, gold medalist(s)
Chad Ho	10 km	1:50:47.9	19
Daniel Marais	10 km	did not finish	
Nicolaos Manoussakis	5 km	55:26.5	16
Nicolaos Manoussakis	25 km	5:20:47.2	23

Women

Athlete	Event	Time	Rank
Carmen Le Roux	5 km	1:04:06.3	27
Carmen Le Roux	10 km	2:06:37.5	41
Clarice Le Roux	5 km	1:05:50.8	32
Michelle Weber	10 km	1:59:28.7	19

Mixed

Athlete	Event	Time	Rank
Chad Ho; Daniel Marais; Michelle Weber	Team	1:00:31.2	18

== Swimming ==
South African swimmers have achieved qualifying standards in the following events (up to a maximum of 2 swimmers in each event at the A-standard entry time, and 1 at the B-standard):

Men

Athlete	Event	Heat		Semifinal		Final	
Athlete	Event	Time	Rank	Time	Rank	Time	Rank
Myles Brown	200 m freestyle	1:47.48	15 Q	1:47.55	12	did not advance	
Myles Brown	400 m freestyle	3:48.86	18	—		did not advance	
Myles Brown	800 m freestyle	8:04.47	28	—		did not advance	
Chad le Clos	200 m freestyle	1:47.17	12 Q	1:46.10	4 Q	1:46.53	6
Chad le Clos	50 m butterfly	23.45	8 Q	23.49	14	did not advance	
Chad le Clos	100 m butterfly	51.83	8 Q	51.11	3 Q	50.56 AF	1st place, gold medalist(s)
Chad le Clos	200 m butterfly	1:56.92	=14 Q	1:54.50	2 Q	1:53.68	2nd place, silver medalist(s)
Sebastien Rousseau	200 m butterfly	1:56.29	11 Q	1:56.96	13	did not advance	
Sebastien Rousseau	400 m individual medley	4:20.16	21	—		did not advance	
Ayrton Sweeney	200 m breaststroke	2:14.98	33	did not advance			
Cameron van der Burgh	50 m breaststroke	26.62 WR	1 Q	26.74	2 Q	26.66	2nd place, silver medalist(s)
Cameron van der Burgh	100 m breaststroke	58.59	2 Q	58.49	2 Q	58.59	2nd place, silver medalist(s)
Cameron van der Burgh	200 m breaststroke	2:12.37	21	did not advance			

== Synchronized swimming ==
South Africa has qualified three synchronized swimmers in the following events.

Athlete	Event	Preliminaries		Final	
Athlete	Event	Points	Rank	Points	Rank
Kerry Norden	Solo technical routine	61.7306	34	did not advance	
Kerry Norden	Solo free routine	65.6667	27	did not advance	
Emma Manners-Wood; Laura Strugnell	Duet technical routine	65.3539	37	did not advance	
Emma Manners-Wood; Laura Strugnell	Duet free routine	66.0000	=35	did not advance	

== Water polo ==
=== Men's tournament ===
Team roster

- Dwayne Flatscher
- Etienne Le Roux
- Devon Card
- Ignardus Badenhorst
- Nicholas Hock
- Joao Marco de Carvalho
- Dayne Jagga
- Jared Wingate-Pearse
- Dean Whyte
- Pierre Le Roux
- Nicholas Molyneux
- Wesley Bohata
- Julian Lewis

Group play

Pos	Team	Pld	W	D	L	GF	GA	GD	Pts	Qualification
1	Hungary	3	3	0	0	52	13	+39	6	Advanced to quarterfinals
2	Kazakhstan	3	2	0	1	34	24	+10	4	Advanced to playoffs
3	South Africa	3	1	0	2	17	37	−20	2	Advanced to playoffs
4	Argentina	3	0	0	3	17	46	−29	0	

Source: SportResult.com
Rules for classification: 1) points; 2) head-to-head points; 3) head-to-head goal difference; 4) head-to-head number of goals scored; 5) goal difference.

27 July 2015; 13:30	Report	South Africa	10–6	Argentina	Kazan; Attendance: 913; Referees: Masoud Rezvani (IRI), Sergey Naumov (RUS)
27 July 2015; 13:30	Report	Score by quarters: 6–2, 1–2, 1–1, 2–1			Kazan; Attendance: 913; Referees: Masoud Rezvani (IRI), Sergey Naumov (RUS)
27 July 2015; 13:30	Report	E. Le Roux, P. Le Roux 3	Goals	Yañez 3	Kazan; Attendance: 913; Referees: Masoud Rezvani (IRI), Sergey Naumov (RUS)

29 July 2015; 12:10	Report	South Africa	4–17	Hungary	Kazan; Attendance: 1,127; Referees: Fabio Toffoli (BRA), Peter de Jong (NED)
29 July 2015; 12:10	Report	Score by quarters: 1–5, 0–3, 2–4, 1–5			Kazan; Attendance: 1,127; Referees: Fabio Toffoli (BRA), Peter de Jong (NED)
29 July 2015; 12:10	Report	Molyneux 2	Goals	Dén. Varga 5	Kazan; Attendance: 1,127; Referees: Fabio Toffoli (BRA), Peter de Jong (NED)

31 July 2015; 09:30	Report	South Africa	3–14	Kazakhstan	Kazan; Attendance: 884; Referees: Fabio Toffoli (BRA), Hatem Gaber (EGY)
31 July 2015; 09:30	Report	Score by quarters: 0–4, 1–3, 1–5, 1–2			Kazan; Attendance: 884; Referees: Fabio Toffoli (BRA), Hatem Gaber (EGY)
31 July 2015; 09:30	Report	three players 1	Goals	Axenov 5	Kazan; Attendance: 884; Referees: Fabio Toffoli (BRA), Hatem Gaber (EGY)

Playoffs

2 August 2015; 20:10	Report	South Africa	1–17	Australia	Kazan; Attendance: 213; Referees: Ni Shi Wei (CHN), German Moller (ARG)
2 August 2015; 20:10	Report	Score by quarters: 1–5, 0–6, 0–2, 0–4			Kazan; Attendance: 213; Referees: Ni Shi Wei (CHN), German Moller (ARG)
2 August 2015; 20:10	Report	E. Le Roux 1	Goals	Younger 4	Kazan; Attendance: 213; Referees: Ni Shi Wei (CHN), German Moller (ARG)

9th–12th place semifinals

4 August 2015; 13:30	Report	Brazil	16–5	South Africa	Kazan; Attendance: 213; Referees: Ni Shi Wei (CHN), Hatem Gaber (EGY)
4 August 2015; 13:30	Report	Score by quarters: 7–3, 2–2, 3–0, 4–0			Kazan; Attendance: 213; Referees: Ni Shi Wei (CHN), Hatem Gaber (EGY)
4 August 2015; 13:30	Report	Vrlic 5	Goals	five players 1	Kazan; Attendance: 213; Referees: Ni Shi Wei (CHN), Hatem Gaber (EGY)

Eleventh place game

6 August 2015; 10:50	Report	Kazakhstan	11–7	South Africa	Kazan; Attendance: 450; Referees: Fabio Toffoli (BRA), Tadao Tahara (JPN)
6 August 2015; 10:50	Report	Score by quarters: 4–2, 1–2, 2–1, 4–2			Kazan; Attendance: 450; Referees: Fabio Toffoli (BRA), Tadao Tahara (JPN)
6 August 2015; 10:50	Report	Axenov 7	Goals	P. Le Roux 3	Kazan; Attendance: 450; Referees: Fabio Toffoli (BRA), Tadao Tahara (JPN)

=== Women's tournament ===
Team roster

- Rebecca Thomas
- Megan Parkes
- Kieren Paley
- Ruby Versfeld
- Megan Schooling
- Amica Hallendorff
- Kimberly Kay
- Delaine Christien
- Lindsay Killeen
- Deborah O'Hanlon
- Kelsey White
- Alexandre Gaiscoigne

Group play

Pos	Team	Pld	W	D	L	GF	GA	GD	Pts	Qualification
1	Australia	3	3	0	0	35	14	+21	6	Advanced to quarterfinals
2	Netherlands	3	2	0	1	38	18	+20	4	Advanced to playoffs
3	Greece	3	1	0	2	36	22	+14	2	Advanced to playoffs
4	South Africa	3	0	0	3	6	61	−55	0	

Source: SportResult.com
Rules for classification: 1) points; 2) head-to-head points; 3) head-to-head goal difference; 4) head-to-head number of goals scored; 5) goal difference.

26 July 2015; 13:30	Report	South Africa	1–22	Netherlands	Kazan; Attendance: 1,049; Referees: German Moller (ARG), Ursula Wengenroth (SUI)
26 July 2015; 13:30	Report	Score by quarters: 1–6, 0–5, 0–3, 0–8			Kazan; Attendance: 1,049; Referees: German Moller (ARG), Ursula Wengenroth (SUI)
26 July 2015; 13:30	Report	Versfeld 1	Goals	Klaassen 6	Kazan; Attendance: 1,049; Referees: German Moller (ARG), Ursula Wengenroth (SUI)

28 July 2015; 10:50	Report	Australia	19–1	South Africa	Kazan; Attendance: 456; Referees: Anne Grandin (FRA), Tadao Tahara (JPN)
28 July 2015; 10:50	Report	Score by quarters: 6–0, 3–1, 7–0, 3–0			Kazan; Attendance: 456; Referees: Anne Grandin (FRA), Tadao Tahara (JPN)
28 July 2015; 10:50	Report	Southern 5	Goals	Versfeld 1	Kazan; Attendance: 456; Referees: Anne Grandin (FRA), Tadao Tahara (JPN)

30 July 2015; 21:30	Report	South Africa	4–20	Greece	Kazan; Attendance: 130; Referees: Anne Grandin (FRA), Ni Shi Wei (CHN)
30 July 2015; 21:30	Report	Score by quarters: 1–5, 1–6, 1–4, 1–5			Kazan; Attendance: 130; Referees: Anne Grandin (FRA), Ni Shi Wei (CHN)
30 July 2015; 21:30	Report	Versfeld, White 2	Goals	Asimaki 5	Kazan; Attendance: 130; Referees: Anne Grandin (FRA), Ni Shi Wei (CHN)

13th–16th place semifinals

1 August 2015; 10:50	Report	New Zealand	11–3	South Africa	Kazan; Attendance: 1,357; Referees: Anne Grandin (FRA), Tadao Tahara (JPN)
1 August 2015; 10:50	Report	Score by quarters: 2–0, 2–0, 4–3, 3–0			Kazan; Attendance: 1,357; Referees: Anne Grandin (FRA), Tadao Tahara (JPN)
1 August 2015; 10:50	Report	Myles 3	Goals	three players 1	Kazan; Attendance: 1,357; Referees: Anne Grandin (FRA), Tadao Tahara (JPN)

15th place game

3 August 2015; 09:30	Report	South Africa	7–15	Japan	Kazan; Attendance: 329; Referees: Peter de Jong (NED), German Moller (ARG)
3 August 2015; 09:30	Report	Score by quarters: 0–2, 0–2, 3–8, 4–3			Kazan; Attendance: 329; Referees: Peter de Jong (NED), German Moller (ARG)
3 August 2015; 09:30	Report	White 2	Goals	Nakano 4	Kazan; Attendance: 329; Referees: Peter de Jong (NED), German Moller (ARG)
