= Switzerland at the 2025 World Aquatics Championships =

- Flag of Switzerland
- World Aquatics code: SUI
- National federation: Swiss Swimming Federation

in Singapore
- Competitors: 12 in 4 sports
- Medals Ranked 21st: Gold 0 Silver 2 Bronze 0 Total 2

World Aquatics Championships appearances
- 1973; 1975; 1978; 1982; 1986; 1991; 1994; 1998; 2001; 2003; 2005; 2007; 2009; 2011; 2013; 2015; 2017; 2019; 2022; 2023; 2024; 2025

Switzerland competed at the 2025 World Aquatics Championships in Singapore from July 11 to August 3, 2025.

== Medalists ==
Medal	Name	Sport	Event	Date
2nd place, silver medalist(s)	Noè Ponti	Swimming	Men's 50 metre butterfly	28 July 2025
2nd place, silver medalist(s)	Noè Ponti	Swimming	Men's 100 metre butterfly	2 August 2025

== Competitors ==
The following is the list of competitors in the Championships.

Sport	Men	Women	Total
Diving	0	1	1
High diving	2	1	3
Open water swimming	2	0	2
Swimming	5	1	6
Total	9	3	12

== Diving ==
Women

Athlete	Event	Preliminaries		Semifinals		Final	
Athlete	Event	Points	Rank	Points	Rank	Points	Rank
Michelle Heimberg	1 m springboard	261.85	4 Q	—		265.65	5
Michelle Heimberg	3 m springboard	303.45	4 Q	282.15	11 Q	309.45	8

== High diving ==
Athlete	Event	Points	Rank
Jean-David Duval	Men's high diving	271.60	19
Pierrick Schafer	Men's high diving	276.50	18
Morgane Herculano	Women's high diving	254.10	12

== Open water swimming ==
Men

Athlete	Event	Heat		Semi-final		Final	
Athlete	Event	Time	Rank	Time	Rank	Time	Rank
Paul Niederberger	Men's 3 km knockout sprints	17:06.9	7 Q	11:34.1	13	Did not advance	
Paul Niederberger	Men's 5 km	—				58:03.9	11
Paul Niederberger	Men's 10 km	—				2:03:29.5	19
Christian Schreiber	Men's 3 km knockout sprints	17:11.5	8 Q	11:34.2	14	Did not advance	
Christian Schreiber	Men's 5 km	—				1:00:27.7	21
Christian Schreiber	Men's 10 km	—				2:01:39.5	10

== Swimming ==
Switzerland entered 6 swimmers.

Men

Athlete	Event	Heat		Semi-final		Final	
Athlete	Event	Time	Rank	Time	Rank	Time	Rank
Antonio Djakovic	200 m freestyle	1:47.96	27	Did not advance			
Antonio Djakovic	400 m freestyle	3:49.14	24	—		Did not advance	
Gian-Luca Gartmann	50 m breaststroke	28.10	44	Did not advance			
Gian-Luca Gartmann	200 m individual medley	2:00.26	20	Did not advance			
Roman Mityukov	50 m backstroke	Did not start		Did not advance			
Roman Mityukov	100 m backstroke	53.92	20	Did not advance			
Roman Mityukov	200 m backstroke	1:56.15	3 Q	1:54.83 NR	4 Q	1:55.57	7
Noè Ponti	50 m butterfly	22.74	1 Q	22.72	2 Q	22.51	2nd place, silver medalist(s)
Noè Ponti	100 m butterfly	50.68	1 Q	50.18	1 Q	49.83 NR	2nd place, silver medalist(s)
Marius Toscan	200 m butterfly	1:58.60	22	Did not advance			
Marius Toscan	400 m individual medley	4:17.01	17	—		Did not advance	

Women

Athlete	Event	Heat		Semi-final		Final	
Athlete	Event	Time	Rank	Time	Rank	Time	Rank
Lisa Mamié	50 m breaststroke	Did not start		Did not advance			
Lisa Mamié	100 m breaststroke	1:08.84	35	Did not advance			
Lisa Mamié	200 m breaststroke	Did not start		Did not advance			
