= Poland at the 2015 World Aquatics Championships =

- Flag of Poland
- FINA code: POL
- National federation: Polski Związek Pływacki
- Website: www.kppzp.pl

in Kazan, Russia
- Competitors: 23 in 4 sports
- Medals Ranked 22nd: Gold 0 Silver 1 Bronze 2 Total 3

World Aquatics Championships appearances
- 1973; 1975; 1978; 1982; 1986; 1991; 1994; 1998; 2001; 2003; 2005; 2007; 2009; 2011; 2013; 2015; 2017; 2019; 2022; 2023; 2024

Poland competed at the 2015 World Aquatics Championships in Kazan, Russia from 24 July to 9 August 2015.

== Medalists ==
Medal	Name	Sport	Event	Date
Silver	Radosław Kawęcki	Swimming	Men's 200 m backstroke	August 7
Bronze	Konrad Czerniak	Swimming	Men's 50 m butterfly	August 3
Bronze	Jan Świtkowski	Swimming	Men's 200 m butterfly	August 5

== Diving ==
Polish divers qualified for the individual spots and synchronized teams at the World Championships.

Men

Athlete	Event	Preliminaries		Semifinals		Final	
Athlete	Event	Points	Rank	Points	Rank	Points	Rank
Kacper Lesiak	3 m springboard	314.55	51	did not advance			
Andrzej Rzeszutek	3 m springboard	359.70	36	did not advance			
Kacper Lesiak; Andrzej Rzeszutek	3 m synchronized springboard	370.08	=13	—		did not advance	

== High diving ==
Poland has qualified one high diver at the World Championships.

Athlete	Event	Points	Rank
Krzysztof Kolanus	Men's high diving	545.85	10

== Open water swimming ==
Poland has qualified one swimmer to compete in the open water marathon.

Athlete	Event	Time	Rank
Mateusz Sawrymowicz	Men's 10 km	1:50:49.1	22

== Swimming ==
Polish swimmers have achieved qualifying standards in the following events (up to a maximum of 2 swimmers in each event at the A-standard entry time, and 1 at the B-standard):

Men

Athlete	Event	Heat		Semifinal		Final	
Athlete	Event	Time	Rank	Time	Rank	Time	Rank
Marcin Cieślak	200 m individual medley	1:59.99	15 Q	1:58.20	6 Q	1:58.14	6
Konrad Czerniak	100 m freestyle	DNS		did not advance			
Konrad Czerniak	50 m butterfly	23.38	4 Q	23.07	4 Q	23.15	3rd place, bronze medalist(s)
Konrad Czerniak	100 m butterfly	51.58	4 Q	51.29	5 Q	51.28	6
Radosław Kawęcki	100 m backstroke	54.20	18	did not advance			
Radosław Kawęcki	200 m backstroke	1:58.09	13 Q	1:55.54	=4 Q	1:54.55	2nd place, silver medalist(s)
Paweł Korzeniowski	100 m freestyle	48.93	16 Q	48.55	10	did not advance	
Paweł Korzeniowski	100 m butterfly	51.79	7 Q	51.51	8 Q	51.46	7
Kacper Majchrzak	200 m freestyle	1:48.12	19	did not advance			
Tomasz Polewka	50 m backstroke	25.25	12 Q	25.11	12	did not advance	
Tomasz Polewka	100 m backstroke	54.26	19	did not advance			
Marcin Stolarski	50 m breaststroke	28.22	32	did not advance			
Marcin Stolarski	100 m breaststroke	1:01.98	33	did not advance			
Marcin Stolarski	200 m breaststroke	2:15.47	35	did not advance			
Jan Świtkowski	200 m butterfly	1:55.78	4 Q	1:55.42	5 Q	1:54.10	3rd place, bronze medalist(s)
Wojciech Wojdak	400 m freestyle	3:46.67	5 Q	—		3:46.81	6
Wojciech Wojdak	800 m freestyle	7:48.95	7 Q	—		7:45.90	6
Wojciech Wojdak	1500 m freestyle	15:14.28	17	—		did not advance	
Mateusz Wysoczyński	200 m backstroke	2:00.26	24	did not advance			
Filip Zaborowski	400 m freestyle	3:47.59	12	—		did not advance	
Paweł Korzeniowski; Kacper Majchrzak; Jan Hołub; Konrad Czerniak	4 × 100 m freestyle relay	3:15.18	7 Q	—		3:14.12	5
Jan Świtkowski; Kacper Klich; Michał Domagała; Kacper Majchrzak	4 × 200 m freestyle relay	7:10.20	5 Q	—		7:10.34	8
Konrad Czerniak; Radosław Kawęcki; Paweł Korzeniowski; Marcin Stolarski	4 × 100 m medley relay	3:33.50	7 Q	—		3:34.34	8

Women

Athlete	Event	Heat		Semifinal		Final	
Athlete	Event	Time	Rank	Time	Rank	Time	Rank
Anna Dowgiert	50 m freestyle	25.44	24	did not advance			
Anna Dowgiert	50 m butterfly	26.24	9 Q	25.91	8 Q	26.20	8
Dominika Sztandera	50 m breaststroke	31.34 NR	18	did not advance			
Dominika Sztandera	100 m breaststroke	1:09.38	33	did not advance			
Alicja Tchórz	50 m backstroke	28.87	26	did not advance			
Alicja Tchórz	100 m backstroke	1:00.61 NR	=15 Q	1:01.09	16	did not advance	
Alicja Tchórz	200 m backstroke	2:10.04	10 Q	2:14.49	16	did not advance	
Aleksandra Urbańczyk	50 m backstroke	28.36	13 Q	28.46	15	did not advance	
Aleksandra Urbańczyk	50 m butterfly	26.82	23	did not advance			
Katarzyna Wilk	100 m freestyle	55.24	24	did not advance			
Katarzyna Wilk; Alicja Tchórz; Aleksandra Urbańczyk; Anna Dowgiert	4 × 100 m freestyle relay	3:40.89	12	—		did not advance	
Alicja Tchórz; Dominika Sztandera; Anna Dowgiert; Katarzyna Wilk	4 × 100 m medley relay	4:04.43	=18	—		did not advance	
