= Chile at the 2015 World Aquatics Championships =

- Flag of Chile
- FINA code: CHI
- National federation: Federación Chilena de Deportes Acuáticos
- Website: www.fechida.cl

in Kazan, Russia
- Competitors: 8 in 3 sports
- Medals: Gold 0 Silver 0 Bronze 0 Total 0

World Aquatics Championships appearances
- 1973; 1975; 1978; 1982; 1986; 1991; 1994; 1998; 2001; 2003; 2005; 2007; 2009; 2011; 2013; 2015; 2017; 2019; 2022; 2023; 2024

Chile competed at the 2015 World Aquatics Championships in Kazan, Russia from 24 July to 9 August 2015.

== Diving ==
Chilean divers qualified for the individual spots and the synchronized teams at the World Championships.

Men

Athlete	Event	Preliminaries		Semifinals		Final	
Athlete	Event	Points	Rank	Points	Rank	Points	Rank
Diego Carquin	3 m springboard	347.70	40	did not advance			
Donato Neglia	3 m springboard	354.65	39	did not advance			
Diego Carquin; Donato Neglia	3 m synchronized springboard	332.94	19	—		did not advance	

== Swimming ==
Chilean swimmers have achieved qualifying standards in the following events (up to a maximum of 2 swimmers in each event at the A-standard entry time, and 1 at the B-standard):

Men

Athlete	Event	Heat		Semifinal		Final	
Athlete	Event	Time	Rank	Time	Rank	Time	Rank
Oliver Elliot	50 m freestyle	23.29	=41	did not advance			
Oliver Elliot	100 m freestyle	52.50	75	did not advance			
Felipe Tapia	800 m freestyle	8:21.27	40	—		did not advance	
Felipe Tapia	1500 m freestyle	15:45.63	36	—		did not advance	

Women

Athlete	Event	Heat		Semifinal		Final	
Athlete	Event	Time	Rank	Time	Rank	Time	Rank
Kristel Köbrich	800 m freestyle	8:33.12	11	—		did not advance	
Kristel Köbrich	1500 m freestyle	16:01.63	4 Q	—		16:06.55	7
Estefanía Urzúa	100 m butterfly	1:04.64	53	did not advance			
Estefanía Urzúa	200 m butterfly	2:19.12	33	did not advance			

== Synchronized swimming ==
Chile has qualified two synchronized swimmers to compete in each of the following events.

Athlete	Event	Preliminaries		Final	
Athlete	Event	Points	Rank	Points	Rank
Kelley Kobler; Natalie Lubascher	Duet technical routine	72.2984	27	did not advance	
Kelley Kobler; Natalie Lubascher	Duet free routine	74.2000	28	did not advance	
