= Switzerland at the 2022 World Aquatics Championships =

- Flag of Switzerland
- World Aquatics code: SUI
- National federation: Swiss Swimming Federation

in Budapest, Hungary
- Competitors: 23 in 3 sports
- Medals: Gold 0 Silver 0 Bronze 0 Total 0

World Aquatics Championships appearances
- 1973; 1975; 1978; 1982; 1986; 1991; 1994; 1998; 2001; 2003; 2005; 2007; 2009; 2011; 2013; 2015; 2017; 2019; 2022; 2023; 2024; 2025

Switzerland competed at the 2022 World Aquatics Championships in Budapest, Hungary from 18 June to 3 July.

== Artistic swimming ==
Switzerland entered 12 artistic swimmers.

Women

Athlete	Event	Preliminaries		Final	
Athlete	Event	Points	Rank	Points	Rank
Ilona Fahrni	Solo technical routine	79.8704	14	did not advance	
Ilona Fahrni	Solo free routine	82.2667	11 Q	83.1000	11
Emma Grosvenor; Margaux Varesio	Duet technical routine	79.9267	13	did not advance	
Ilona Fahrni; Babou Schupbach	Duet free routine	81.4000	13	did not advance	
Ilona Fahrni; Emma Grosvenor; Milla Morel; Sofie Müntener; Babou Schupbach; Alicia Semon; Fanny Semon; Margaux Varesio	Team technical routine	81.3767	10 Q	81.5920	10
Ilona Fahrni; Ladina Lippuner; Milla Morel; Sofie Müntener; Babou Schupbach; Alicia Semon; Anna Tary; Margaux Varesio	Team free routine	81.0333	13	did not advance	
Ladina Lippuner; Milla Morel; Sofie Müntener; Alice Ponsar; Gaia Rasmussen; Babou Schupbach; Alicia Semon; Fanny Semon; Anna Tary; Margaux Varesio	Highlight routine	80.6333	10 Q	80.9000	10

== Diving ==
Switzerland entered 4 divers.

Men

Athlete	Event	Preliminaries		Semifinals		Final	
Athlete	Event	Points	Rank	Points	Rank	Points	Rank
Guillaume Dutoit	1 m springboard	342.00	16	—N/a		did not advance	
Guillaume Dutoit	3 m springboard	370.55	15 Q	361.20	11 Q	394.10	8
Jonathan Suckow	1 m springboard	355.35	13	—N/a		did not advance	
Jonathan Suckow	3 m springboard	364.40	19	did not advance			
Guillaume Dutoit; Jonathan Suckow	Synchronized 3 m springboard	345.00	9	—N/a		376.05	4

Women

Athlete	Event	Preliminaries		Semifinals		Final	
Athlete	Event	Points	Rank	Points	Rank	Points	Rank
Madeline Coquoz	1 m springboard	206.35	32	—N/a		did not advance	
Madeline Coquoz	3 m springboard	252.55	19	did not advance			
Michelle Heimberg	1 m springboard	253.10	5 Q	—N/a		255.60	11
Michelle Heimberg	3 m springboard	292.85	8 Q	277.80	11 Q	301.95	6

Mixed

Athlete	Event	Final	
Athlete	Event	Points	Rank
Guillaume Dutoit; Madeline Coquoz	Synchronized 3 m springboard	254.31	10

== Swimming ==
Switzerland entered 7 swimmers.

Men

Athlete	Event	Heat		Semifinal		Final	
Athlete	Event	Time	Rank	Time	Rank	Time	Rank
Jérémy Desplanches	100 m breaststroke	1:01.24	22	did not advance			
Jérémy Desplanches	200 m individual medley	1:58.29	3 Q	1:58.31	11	did not advance	
Jérémy Desplanches	400 m individual medley	did not start		—N/a		did not advance	
Antonio Djakovic	200 m freestyle	1:47.00	12 Q	1:46.61	11	did not advance	
Antonio Djakovic	400 m freestyle	3:46.90	10	—N/a		did not advance	
Roman Mityukov	100 m freestyle	48.77	20	did not advance			
Roman Mityukov	200 m freestyle	1:47.44	15 Q	1:47.78	16	did not advance	
Roman Mityukov	100 m backstroke	did not start		did not advance			
Roman Mityukov	200 m backstroke	1:58.61	12 Q	1:57.08	7	1:57.45	7
Noè Ponti	50 m butterfly	23.04 NR	5 Q	23.29	13	did not advance	
Noè Ponti	100 m butterfly	51.17	3 Q	51.18	4 Q	51.51	8
Noè Ponti	200 m butterfly	1:54.75 NR	2 Q	1:54.20 NR	3 Q	1:54.29	4

Women

Athlete	Event	Heat		Semifinal		Final	
Athlete	Event	Time	Rank	Time	Rank	Time	Rank
Lisa Mamié	100 m breaststroke	did not start		did not advance			
Lisa Mamié	200 m breaststroke	2:27.28	12 Q	2:25.56	10	did not advance	
Alexandra Touretski	50 m freestyle	25.68	21	did not advance			
Maria Ugolkova	100 m freestyle	54.78	18	did not advance			
Maria Ugolkova	50 m butterfly	26.58	18	did not advance			
Maria Ugolkova	100 m butterfly	did not start		did not advance			
Maria Ugolkova	200 m individual medley	2:12.27	13 Q	2:11.06	9	did not advance	
