= Diving at the 2015 World Aquatics Championships – Mixed synchronized 3 metre springboard =

Mixed synchronized 3 metre springboard at the 2015 World Aquatics Championships
- Dates: 2 August
- Competitors: 26 from 13 nations
- Winning points: 339.90

Medalists
gold medal	Wang Han; Yang Hao	China
silver medal	Jennifer Abel; François Imbeau-Dulac	Canada
bronze medal	Tania Cagnotto; Maicol Verzotto	Italy

The Mixed synchronized 3 metre springboard competition of the diving events at the 2015 World Aquatics Championships was held on 2 August 2015.

== Results ==
The final was held at 15:00.

Rank	Nation	Divers	Points
1st place, gold medalist(s)	China	Wang Han; Yang Hao	339.90
2nd place, silver medalist(s)	Canada	Jennifer Abel; François Imbeau-Dulac	317.01
3rd place, bronze medalist(s)	Italy	Tania Cagnotto; Maicol Verzotto	315.30
4	Australia	Grant Nel; Maddison Keeney	310.02
5	Mexico	Dolores Hernández; Rommel Pacheco	308.40
6	Russia	Maria Polyakova; Ilia Molchanov	306.27
7	Malaysia	Ng Yan Yee; Muhammad Puteh	291.42
8	Germany	Timo Barthel; Christina Wassen	287.94
9	United States	Abigail Johnston; Jordan Windle	287.70
10	Switzerland	Guillaume Dutoit; Jessica Favre	284.34
11	New Zealand	Elizabeth Cui; Liam Stone	277.86
12	Colombia	Diana Pineda; Sebastián Villa	266.22
13	Brazil	Ian Matos; Juliana Veloso	249.60
