= New Zealand at the 2015 World Aquatics Championships =

- Flag of New Zealand
- FINA code: NZL
- National federation: Swimming New Zealand
- Website: swimmingnz.org.nz

in Kazan, Russia
- Competitors: 35 in 5 sports
- Medals Ranked 20th: Gold 0 Silver 2 Bronze 0 Total 2

World Aquatics Championships appearances
- 1973; 1975; 1978; 1982; 1986; 1991; 1994; 1998; 2001; 2003; 2005; 2007; 2009; 2011; 2013; 2015; 2017; 2019; 2022; 2023; 2024

New Zealand competed at the 2015 World Aquatics Championships in Kazan, Russia from 24 July to 9 August 2015.

== Medalists ==
Medal	Name	Sport	Event	Date
Silver	Lauren Boyle	Swimming	Women's 1500 m freestyle	August 4
Silver	Lauren Boyle	Swimming	Women's 800 m freestyle	August 8

== Diving ==
New Zealand divers qualified for the individual spots and the synchronized teams at the World Championships.

Men

Athlete	Event	Preliminaries		Semifinals		Final	
Athlete	Event	Points	Rank	Points	Rank	Points	Rank
Liam Stone	1 m springboard	310.25	24	—		did not advance	
Liam Stone	3 m springboard	413.10	21	did not advance			

Women

Athlete	Event	Preliminaries		Semifinals		Final	
Athlete	Event	Points	Rank	Points	Rank	Points	Rank
Elizabeth Cui	1 m springboard	227.05	24	—		did not advance	
Elizabeth Cui	3 m springboard	233.70	36	did not advance			

Mixed

Athlete	Event	Final	
Athlete	Event	Points	Rank
Liam Stone; Elizabeth Cui	3 m synchronized springboard	277.86	11

== Open water swimming ==
New Zealand has qualified two swimmers to compete in the open water marathon.

Athlete	Event	Time	Rank
Kane Radford	Men's 10 km	1:51:29.4	30
Charlotte Webby	Women's 10 km	2:12:41.7	45

== Swimming ==
New Zealand swimmers have achieved qualifying standards in the following events (up to a maximum of 2 swimmers in each event at the A-standard entry time, and 1 at the B-standard):

Men

Athlete	Event	Heat		Semifinal		Final	
Athlete	Event	Time	Rank	Time	Rank	Time	Rank
Bradlee Ashby	100 m butterfly	54.57	47	did not advance			
Bradlee Ashby	200 m butterfly	2:04.31	33	did not advance			
Bradlee Ashby	200 m individual medley	2:02.96	25	did not advance			
Nathan Capp	800 m freestyle	7:57.61	20	—		did not advance	
Nathan Capp	400 m individual medley	4:23.00	28	—		did not advance	
Corey Main	100 m backstroke	54.51	22	did not advance			
Corey Main	200 m backstroke	1:58.22	14 Q	1:59.60	16	did not advance	
Glenn Snyders	50 m breaststroke	27.23	7 Q	27.17	6 Q	27.36	7
Glenn Snyders	100 m breaststroke	1:00.44	18	did not advance			
Matthew Stanley	200 m freestyle	1:48.67	28	did not advance			
Matthew Stanley	400 m freestyle	3:56.71	47	—		did not advance	
Bradlee Ashby; Corey Main; Glenn Snyders; Matthew Stanley	4×100 m medley relay	3:38.69	16	—		did not advance	

Women

Athlete	Event	Heat		Semifinal		Final	
Athlete	Event	Time	Rank	Time	Rank	Time	Rank
Lauren Boyle	400 m freestyle	4:05.53	4 Q	—		4:04.38	5
Lauren Boyle	800 m freestyle	8:23.66	4 Q	—		8:17.65 OC	2nd place, silver medalist(s)
Lauren Boyle	1500 m freestyle	16:02.84	5 Q	—		15:40.14 OC	2nd place, silver medalist(s)
Bobbie Gichard	50 m backstroke	29.15	29	did not advance			
Bobbie Gichard	100 m backstroke	1:01.26	26	did not advance			
Bobbie Gichard	200 m backstroke	2:13.45	25	did not advance			
Emma Robinson	400 m freestyle	4:16.43	28	—		did not advance	
Emma Robinson	800 m freestyle	8:44.86	27	—		did not advance	

== Synchronized swimming ==
New Zealand fielded a full squad of ten synchronized swimmers to compete in each of the following events.

Athlete	Event	Preliminaries		Final	
Athlete	Event	Points	Rank	Points	Rank
Caitlin Anderson; Kirstin Anderson; Aleisha Braven; Leticia Hart; Victoria Hohaia; Amy Rose Lowans; Eva Grace Morris; Jazzlee Thomas; Anastasia Wilkes; Sarsha Younger	Team technical routine	69.4142	21	did not advance	
Caitlin Anderson; Kirstin Anderson; Aleisha Braven; Leticia Hart; Victoria Hohaia; Amy Rose Lowans; Eva Grace Morris; Jazzlee Thomas; Anastasia Wilkes; Sarsha Younger	Team free routine	72.5667	17	did not advance	

== Water polo ==
=== Women's tournament ===
Team roster

- Brooke Millar
- Nicole Lewis
- Sarah Pattison
- Danielle Lewis
- Simone Lewis
- Sarah Landry
- Miranda Chase
- Caitlin Lopes Da Silva
- Emma Stoneman
- Liana Dance
- Kirsten Hudson
- Jasmine Myles
- Katherine Curnow

Group play

Pos	Team	Pld	W	D	L	GF	GA	GD	Pts	Qualification
1	Spain	3	3	0	0	49	15	+34	6	Advanced to quarterfinals
2	Canada	3	2	0	1	38	22	+16	4	Advanced to playoffs
3	Kazakhstan	3	1	0	2	25	35	−10	2	Advanced to playoffs
4	New Zealand	3	0	0	3	12	52	−40	0	

Source: SportResult.com
Rules for classification: 1) points; 2) head-to-head points; 3) head-to-head goal difference; 4) head-to-head number of goals scored; 5) goal difference.

26 July 2015; 09:30	Report	Canada	15–6	New Zealand	Kazan; Attendance: 865; Referees: Fabio Toffoli (BRA), Tadao Tahara (JPN)
26 July 2015; 09:30	Report	Score by quarters: 5–1, 2–3, 4–2, 4–0			Kazan; Attendance: 865; Referees: Fabio Toffoli (BRA), Tadao Tahara (JPN)
26 July 2015; 09:30	Report	M. Eggens, Fournier 3	Goals	Myles 2	Kazan; Attendance: 865; Referees: Fabio Toffoli (BRA), Tadao Tahara (JPN)

28 July 2015; 20:10	Report	Spain	23–2	New Zealand	Kazan; Attendance: 300; Referees: Ursula Wengenroth (SUI), Fabio Toffoli (BRA)
28 July 2015; 20:10	Report	Score by quarters: 3–0, 7–1, 5–1, 8–0			Kazan; Attendance: 300; Referees: Ursula Wengenroth (SUI), Fabio Toffoli (BRA)
28 July 2015; 20:10	Report	Tarragó 6	Goals	D. Lewis, Lopes Da Silva 1	Kazan; Attendance: 300; Referees: Ursula Wengenroth (SUI), Fabio Toffoli (BRA)

30 July 2015; 17:30	Report	Kazakhstan	14–4	New Zealand	Kazan; Attendance: 985; Referees: Ursula Wengenroth (SUI), Tadao Tahara (JPN)
30 July 2015; 17:30	Report	Score by quarters: 3–0, 4–0, 4–1, 3–3			Kazan; Attendance: 985; Referees: Ursula Wengenroth (SUI), Tadao Tahara (JPN)
30 July 2015; 17:30	Report	Akilbayeva 6	Goals	D. Lewis 3	Kazan; Attendance: 985; Referees: Ursula Wengenroth (SUI), Tadao Tahara (JPN)

13th–16th place semifinals

1 August 2015; 10:50	Report	New Zealand	11–3	South Africa	Kazan; Attendance: 1,357; Referees: Anne Grandin (FRA), Tadao Tahara (JPN)
1 August 2015; 10:50	Report	Score by quarters: 2–0, 2–0, 4–3, 3–0			Kazan; Attendance: 1,357; Referees: Anne Grandin (FRA), Tadao Tahara (JPN)
1 August 2015; 10:50	Report	Myles 3	Goals	three players 1	Kazan; Attendance: 1,357; Referees: Anne Grandin (FRA), Tadao Tahara (JPN)

13th place game

3 August 2015; 10:50	Report	New Zealand	7–6	France	Kazan; Attendance: 400; Referees: Dion Willis (RSA), Stephane Roy (CAN)
3 August 2015; 10:50	Report	Score by quarters: 1–2, 3–2, 1–2, 2–0			Kazan; Attendance: 400; Referees: Dion Willis (RSA), Stephane Roy (CAN)
3 August 2015; 10:50	Report	Myles 2	Goals	Millot, Tardy 2	Kazan; Attendance: 400; Referees: Dion Willis (RSA), Stephane Roy (CAN)
