= Diving at the 2015 World Aquatics Championships – Men's 10 metre platform =

Men's 10 metre platform at the 2015 World Aquatics Championships
- Dates: 1–2 August
- Competitors: 48 from 28 nations
- Winning points: 587.00

Medalists
gold medal	Qiu Bo	China
silver medal	David Boudia	United States
bronze medal	Tom Daley	Great Britain

The Men's 10 metre platform competition of the diving events at the 2015 World Aquatics Championships was held on 1–2 August 2015.

== Results ==
The preliminary round was held on 1 August at 10:00. The semifinal was held on 1 August at 15:00. The final was held on 2 August at 19:30.

Green denotes finalists

Blue denotes semifinalists

Rank	Diver	Nationality	Preliminary		Semifinal		Final	
Rank	Diver	Nationality	Points	Rank	Points	Rank	Points	Rank
1st place, gold medalist(s)	Qiu Bo	China	513.00	3	577.00	1	587.00	1
2nd place, silver medalist(s)	David Boudia	United States	552.80	1	506.15	5	560.20	2
3rd place, bronze medalist(s)	Tom Daley	Great Britain	466.55	9	524.70	3	537.95	3
4	Iván García	Mexico	498.25	5	505.95	6	518.95	4
5	Benjamin Auffret	France	463.60	10	461.35	11	490.25	5
6	Viktor Minibaev	Russia	518.95	2	510.95	4	486.40	6
7	Nikita Shleikher	Russia	466.75	8	468.95	9	482.70	7
8	Domonic Bedggood	Australia	441.50	13	469.05	8	470.40	8
9	Vadim Kaptur	Belarus	456.30	12	440.30	12	455.20	9
10	Yang Jian	China	501.00	4	539.75	2	451.20	10
11	Sascha Klein	Germany	476.20	7	487.05	7	445.55	11
12	José Ruvalcaba	Mexico	428.90	17	467.10	10	442.15	12
13	James Connor	Australia	435.95	15	427.75	13		
14	Martin Wolfram	Germany	487.90	6	407.90	14		
15	David Dinsmore	United States	462.75	11	403.80	15		
16	Vincent Riendeau	Canada	435.45	16	396.10	16		
17	Kim Yeong-nam	South Korea	427.30	18	389.05	17		
18	Matthew Lee	Great Britain	437.35	14	357.60	18		
19	Maksym Dolgov	Ukraine	424.80	19				
20	Maxim Bouchard	Canada	407.40	20				
21	Yu Okamoto	Japan	402.10	21				
22	Ooi Tze Liang	Malaysia	400.75	22				
23	Jesús Liranzo	Venezuela	399.30	23				
24	Jeinkler Aguirre	Cuba	393.80	24				
25	Kim Sun-bom	North Korea	388.60	25				
26	Francesco Dell'Uomo	Italy	388.35	26				
27	Sebastián Villa	Colombia	384.80	27				
28	Woo Ha-ram	South Korea	382.65	28				
29	Lev Sargsyan	Armenia	374.10	29				
30	Víctor Ortega	Colombia	373.60	30				
31	Rafael Quintero	Puerto Rico	367.45	31				
32	Jesper Tolvers	Sweden	366.35	32				
33	Maicol Verzotto	Italy	359.35	33				
34	Espen Valheim	Norway	358.05	34				
35	Chew Yiwei	Malaysia	353.70	35				
36	Isaac Souza	Brazil	352.25	36				
37	Oscar Ariza	Venezuela	336.80	37				
38	Cătălin Cozma	Romania	331.85	38				
39	Alexis Jandard	France	322.20	39				
40	Jackson Oliveira	Brazil	318.55	40				
41	Daniel Jensen	Norway	316.10	41				
42	Vladimir Harutyunyan	Armenia	313.45	42				
43	Frandiel Gómez	Dominican Republic	306.95	43				
44	Takuma Hagita	Japan	290.70	44				
45	Youssef Ezzat	Egypt	282.50	45				
46	Mohab El-Kordy	Egypt	276.90	46				
47	Yusmandy Paz	Cuba	249.00	47				
48	Botir Khasanov	Uzbekistan	209.25	48				
