= Swimming at the 2015 World Aquatics Championships – Men's 200 metre backstroke =

Men's 200 metre backstroke at the 2015 World Aquatics Championships
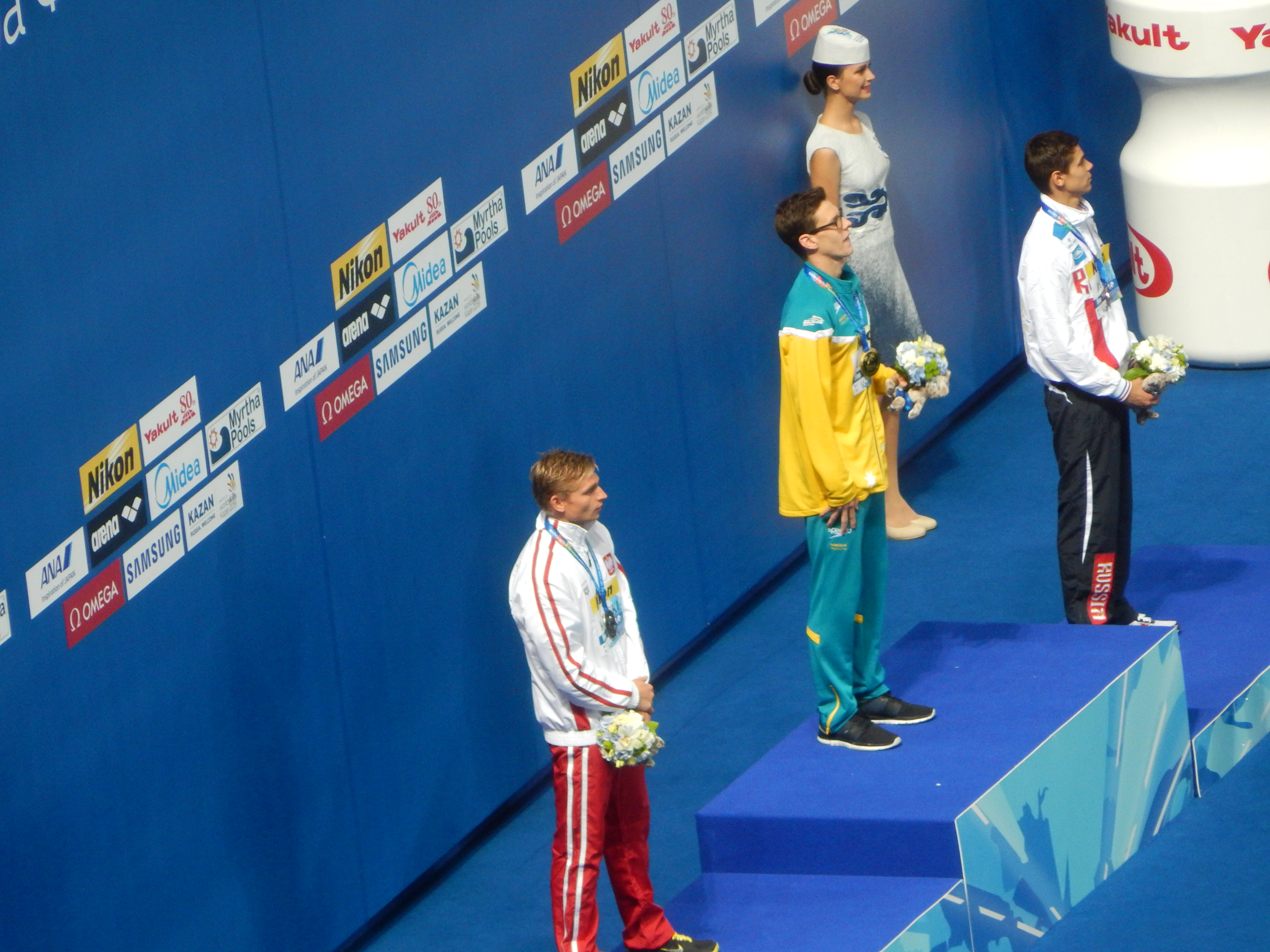
- Victory Ceremony
- Dates: 6 August (heats and semifinals); 7 August (final)
- Competitors: 37 from 30 nations
- Winning time: 1:53.58

Medalists
gold medal	Mitch Larkin	Australia
silver medal	Radosław Kawęcki	Poland
bronze medal	Evgeny Rylov	Russia

The Men's 200 metre backstroke competition of the swimming events at the 2015 World Aquatics Championships was held on 6 August with the heats and the semifinals and 7 August with the final.

== Records ==
Prior to the competition, the existing world and championship records were as follows.

World record	Aaron Peirsol (USA)	1:51.92	Rome, Italy	31 July 2009
Competition record	Aaron Peirsol (USA)	1:51.92	Rome, Italy	31 July 2009

== Results ==
=== Heats ===
The heats were held at 09:56.

Rank	Heat	Lane	Name	Nationality	Time	Notes
1	4	5	Mitch Larkin	Australia	1:55.88	Q
2	3	4	Ryosuke Irie	Japan	1:56.68	Q
3	3	5	Ryan Murphy	United States	1:56.71	Q
4	3	3	Evgeny Rylov	Russia	1:56.78	Q
5	2	4	Xu Jiayu	China	1:56.90	Q
6	4	4	Tyler Clary	United States	1:56.92	Q
7	4	6	Christian Diener	Germany	1:57.42	Q
8	4	3	Josh Beaver	Australia	1:57.62	Q
9	2	3	Masaki Kaneko	Japan	1:57.63	Q
10	3	7	Leonardo de Deus	Brazil	1:57.73	Q
11	4	1	Grigory Tarasevich	Russia	1:57.77	Q
12	2	2	Li Guangyuan	China	1:58.02	Q
13	2	5	Radosław Kawęcki	Poland	1:58.09	Q
14	2	1	Corey Main	New Zealand	1:58.22	Q
15	4	2	Luca Mencarini	Italy	1:58.31	Q
16	2	6	Gábor Balog	Hungary	1:58.55	Q
17	4	7	Yakov Toumarkin	Israel	1:58.64	
18	3	6	Christopher Ciccarese	Italy	1:58.79	
19	3	2	Danas Rapšys	Lithuania	1:59.00	
20	2	7	Benjamin Stasiulis	France	1:59.05	
21	1	5	Lavrans Solli	Norway	1:59.23	
22	3	8	Omar Pinzón	Colombia	1:59.24	
23	2	8	Carlos Omaña	Venezuela	1:59.59	NR
24	3	1	Mateusz Wysoczyński	Poland	2:00.26	
25	4	9	Armando Barrera	Cuba	2:00.92	
26	1	3	Rexford Tullius	Virgin Islands	2:01.22	
27	4	0	Roman Dmytrijev	Czech Republic	2:01.49	
28	3	0	Matias López	Paraguay	2:01.74	
29	2	0	Lukas Rauftlin	Switzerland	2:03.00	
30	1	6	Lin Shih-chieh	Chinese Taipei	2:04.00	
31	1	4	Yeziel Morales	Puerto Rico	2:04.15	
32	2	9	Lê Nguyễn Paul	Vietnam	2:04.78	
33	3	9	Vuk Čelić	Serbia	2:05.54	
34	1	2	Boris Kirillov	Azerbaijan	2:06.74	
35	1	7	Lushano Lamprecht	Namibia	2:08.14	
36	1	1	Driss Lahrichi	Morocco	2:09.14	
37	1	8	Rami Elias	Sudan	2:19.53	
	4	8	Apostolos Christou	Greece		DNS

=== Semifinals ===
The semifinals were held at 18:57.

==== Semifinal 1 ====
Rank	Lane	Name	Nationality	Time	Notes
1	5	Evgeny Rylov	Russia	1:55.54	Q
2	4	Ryosuke Irie	Japan	1:55.76	Q
3	3	Tyler Clary	United States	1:56.58	Q
4	7	Li Guangyuan	China	1:57.12	Q
5	8	Gábor Balog	Hungary	1:57.91	
6	2	Leonardo de Deus	Brazil	1:57.96	
7	6	Josh Beaver	Australia	1:57.99	
8	1	Corey Main	New Zealand	1:59.50	

==== Semifinal 2 ====
Rank	Lane	Name	Nationality	Time	Notes
1	4	Mitch Larkin	Australia	1:54.29	Q, OC
2	5	Ryan Murphy	United States	1:55.10	Q
3	3	Xu Jiayu	China	1:55.13	Q
4	1	Radosław Kawęcki	Poland	1:55.54	Q
5	6	Christian Diener	Germany	1:57.17	
6	2	Masaki Kaneko	Japan	1:57.33	
7	8	Luca Mencarini	Italy	1:57.81	
8	7	Grigory Tarasevich	Russia	1:58.30	

=== Final ===
The final was held on 7 August at 17:40.

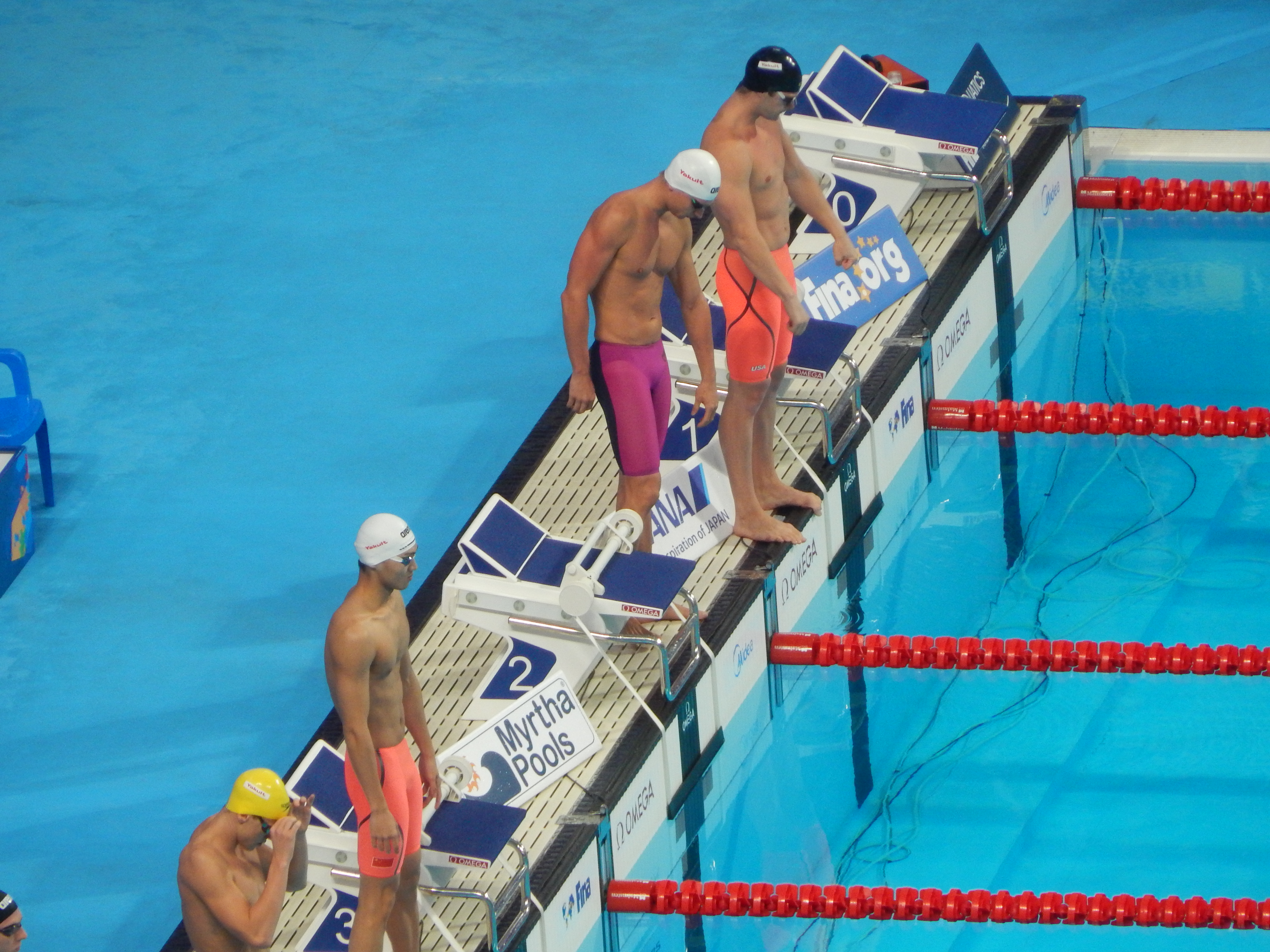
Before the final (from top: Clary, Kawecki, Xu, Larkin)

Rank	Lane	Name	Nationality	Time	Notes
1st place, gold medalist(s)	4	Mitch Larkin	Australia	1:53.58	OC
2nd place, silver medalist(s)	2	Radosław Kawęcki	Poland	1:54.55	
3rd place, bronze medalist(s)	6	Evgeny Rylov	Russia	1:54.60	NR
4	7	Ryosuke Irie	Japan	1:54.81	
5	5	Ryan Murphy	United States	1:55.00	
6	3	Xu Jiayu	China	1:55.20	
7	1	Tyler Clary	United States	1:56.26	
8	8	Li Guangyuan	China	1:56.79	WJ
