= South Korea at the 2015 World Aquatics Championships =

- Flag of South Korea
- World Aquatics code: KOR
- National federation: Korean Swimming Federation
- Website: swimming.sports.or.kr

in Kazan, Russia
- Competitors: 16 in 3 sports
- Medals: Gold 0 Silver 0 Bronze 0 Total 0

World Aquatics Championships appearances
- 1973; 1975; 1978; 1982; 1986; 1991; 1994; 1998; 2001; 2003; 2005; 2007; 2009; 2011; 2013; 2015; 2017; 2019; 2022; 2023; 2024; 2025

South Korea competed at the 2015 World Aquatics Championships in Kazan, Russia from 24 July to 9 August 2015.

== Diving ==
South Korean divers qualified for the individual spots and the synchronized teams at the World Championships.

Men

Athlete	Event	Preliminaries		Semifinals		Final	
Athlete	Event	Points	Rank	Points	Rank	Points	Rank
Kim Yeong-nam	1 m springboard	317.20	22	—N/a		did not advance	
Kim Yeong-nam	3 m springboard	416.85	20	did not advance			
Kim Yeong-nam	10 m platform	427.30	18 Q	389.05	17	did not advance	
Woo Ha-ram	1 m springboard	378.60	7 Q	—N/a		399.55	9
Woo Ha-ram	3 m springboard	423.80	13 Q	450.90	12 Q	491.50	7
Woo Ha-ram	10 m platform	382.65	28	did not advance			
Kim Yeong-nam; Woo Ha-ram	3 m synchronized springboard	368.88	15	—N/a		did not advance	
Kim Yeong-nam; Woo Ha-ram	10 m synchronized platform	417.24	7 Q	—N/a		421.80	7

Women

Athlete	Event	Preliminaries		Semifinals		Final	
Athlete	Event	Points	Rank	Points	Rank	Points	Rank
Kim Na-mi	1 m springboard	241.10	13	—N/a		did not advance	
Kim Na-mi	3 m springboard	112.25	47	did not advance			
Kim Su-ji	1 m springboard	247.10	11 Q	—N/a		258.50	8
Kim Su-ji	3 m springboard	238.60	34	did not advance			
Kim Su-ji	10 m platform	295.00	=24	did not advance			
Ko Eun-ji	10 m platform	255.00	32	did not advance			
Kim Na-mi; Kim Su-ji	3 m synchronised springboard	252.66	13	—N/a		did not advance	
Kim Su-ji; Ko Eun-ji	10 m synchronised platform	273.42	12 Q	—N/a		271.11	12

Mixed

Athlete	Event	Final	
Athlete	Event	Points	Rank
Woo Ha-ram; Kim Na-mi	Team	331.95	12

== Swimming ==
South Korean swimmers have achieved qualifying standards in the following events (up to a maximum of 2 swimmers in each event at the A-standard entry time, and 1 at the B-standard): Swimmers must qualify at the 2015 Dong-A Tournament and KSF National & President's Cup (for pool events) to eclipse the FINA A-cut or national standard record times of each event and to confirm their places for the Worlds.

Men

Athlete	Event	Heat		Semifinal		Final	
Athlete	Event	Time	Rank	Time	Rank	Time	Rank
Park Seon-kwan	100 m freestyle	50.53	47	did not advance			
Park Seon-kwan	50 m backstroke	25.33	19	did not advance			
Park Seon-kwan	100 m backstroke	54.80	25	did not advance			

Women

Athlete	Event	Heat		Semifinal		Final	
Athlete	Event	Time	Rank	Time	Rank	Time	Rank
An Se-hyeon	50 m butterfly	26.90	=26	did not advance			
An Se-hyeon	100 m butterfly	58.24	9 Q	58.44	13	did not advance	
Cho Hyun-joo	400 m freestyle	4:15.39	26	—N/a		did not advance	
Cho Hyun-joo	800 m freestyle	8:57.66	32	—N/a		did not advance	
Jung Seul-ki	100 m breaststroke	1:10.19	37	did not advance			
Jung Seul-ki	200 m breaststroke	2:31.85	33	did not advance			
Nam Yoo-sun	200 m individual medley	2:16.58	26	did not advance			
Nam Yoo-sun	400 m individual medley	4:43.83	18	—N/a		did not advance	
Park Han-byeol	50 m backstroke	28.85	24	did not advance			
Park Han-byeol	100 m backstroke	1:02.12	36	did not advance			
Park Jin-young	100 m butterfly	59.74	30	did not advance			
Park Jin-young	200 m butterfly	2:09.62	14 Q	2:09.21	=14	did not advance	
Park Soo-jin	200 m butterfly	2:11.07	20	did not advance			
Yang Ji-won	50 m breaststroke	32.63	43	did not advance			
Yang Ji-won	200 m breaststroke	2:29.24	25	did not advance			

== Synchronized swimming ==
South Korea has qualified two synchronized swimmers for each of the following events.

Athlete	Event	Preliminaries		Final	
Athlete	Event	Points	Rank	Points	Rank
Uhm Ji-wan	Solo technical routine	70.6077	21	did not advance	
Uhm Ji-wan	Solo free routine	72.5000	23	did not advance	
Uhm Ji-wan; Won Ji-soo	Duet technical routine	69.4136	33	did not advance	
Uhm Ji-wan; Won Ji-soo	Duet free routine	71.9333	31	did not advance	
