= Diving at the 2015 World Aquatics Championships – Men's 1 metre springboard =

Men's 1 metre springboard at the 2015 World Aquatics Championships
- Dates: 24–27 July
- Competitors: 40 from 27 nations
- Winning points: 485.50

Medalists
gold medal	Xie Siyi	China
silver medal	Illya Kvasha	Ukraine
bronze medal	Michael Hixon	United States

The Men's 1 metre springboard competition of the diving events at the 2015 World Aquatics Championships was held on 24 and 27 July 2015.

== Results ==
The preliminary round was held on 24 July at 15:00. The final was held on 27 July at 15:00.

Green denotes finalists

Rank	Diver	Nationality	Preliminary		Final	
Rank	Diver	Nationality	Points	Rank	Points	Rank
1st place, gold medalist(s)	Xie Siyi	China	404.40	2	485.50	1
2nd place, silver medalist(s)	Illya Kvasha	Ukraine	402.60	3	449.05	2
3rd place, bronze medalist(s)	Michael Hixon	United States	373.85	9	428.30	3
4	Jahir Ocampo	Mexico	412.70	1	427.35	4
5	Oleh Kolodiy	Ukraine	361.55	12	423.50	5
6	Kristian Ipsen	United States	400.75	4	420.65	6
7	He Chao	China	394.95	5	415.50	7
8	Constantin Blaha	Austria	383.30	6	404.40	8
9	Woo Ha-ram	South Korea	378.60	7	399.55	9
10	Matthieu Rosset	France	369.15	10	392.65	10
11	Rommel Pacheco	Mexico	376.10	8	390.95	11
12	Sebastián Morales	Colombia	363.70	11	387.35	12
13	Rafael Quintero	Puerto Rico	354.60	13		
14	Oliver Homuth	Germany	353.00	14		
15	Yauheni Karaliou	Belarus	352.70	15		
16	Giovanni Tocci	Italy	348.80	16		
17	Ilya Molchanov	Russia	343.05	17		
18	Evgenii Novoselov	Russia	337.15	18		
19	Yona Knight-Wisdom	Jamaica	335.95	19		
20	Andrea Chiarabini	Italy	334.10	20		
21	Timo Barthel	Germany	324.35	21		
22	Kim Yeong-nam	South Korea	317.20	22		
23	Guillaume Dutoit	Switzerland	311.55	23		
24	Liam Stone	New Zealand	310.25	24		
25	Nicolás García	Spain	310.00	25		
26	James Denny	Great Britain	309.60	26		
27	Emadeldin Abdellatif	Egypt	309.45	27		
28	Jouni Kallunki	Finland	296.60	28		
29	Héctor García	Spain	294.55	29		
30	Espen Bergslien	Norway	292.55	30		
31	Adityo Putra	Indonesia	288.05	31		
32	Arturo Valdés	Cuba	283.35	32		
33	Frandiel Gómez	Dominican Republic	282.35	33		
34	Miguel Reyes	Colombia	277.80	34		
35	Jesús Liranzo	Venezuela	256.45	35		
36	Tri Anggoro Priambodo	Indonesia	249.55	36		
37	Abdulrahman Abbas	Kuwait	243.00	37		
38	Mirzokhid Mirkarimov	Uzbekistan	234.15	38		
39	Youssef Ezzat	Egypt	233.35	39		
40	Hasan Qali	Kuwait	192.90	40		
