= Swimming at the 2015 World Aquatics Championships – Women's 200 metre butterfly =

Women's 200 metre butterfly at the 2015 World Aquatics Championships
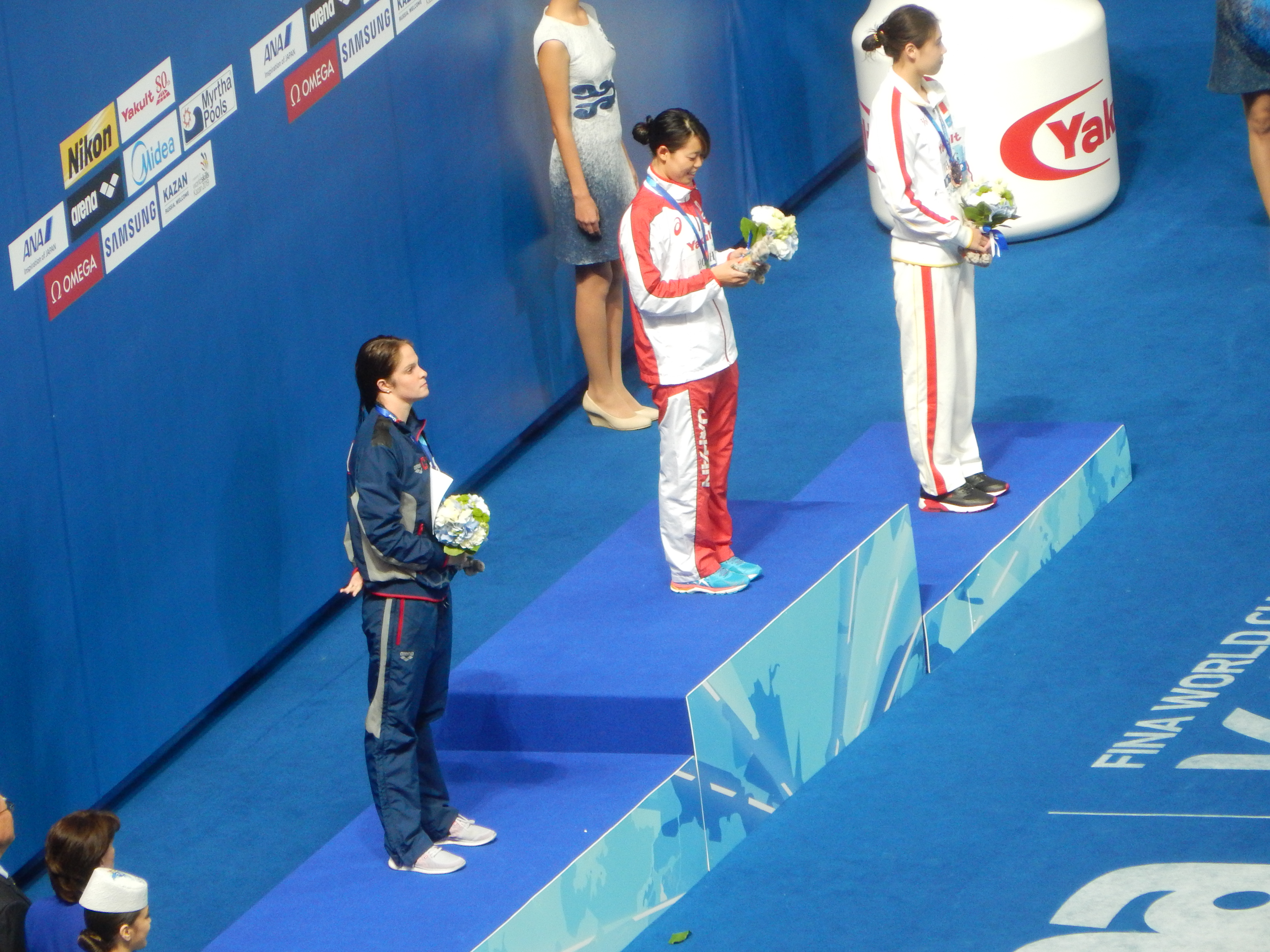
- Victory Ceremony
- Dates: 5 August (heats and semifinals); 6 August (final)
- Competitors: 39 from 32 nations
- Winning time: 2:05.56

Medalists
gold medal	Natsumi Hoshi	Japan
silver medal	Cammile Adams	United States
bronze medal	Zhang Yufei	China

The Women's 200 metre butterfly competition of the swimming events at the 2015 World Aquatics Championships was held on 5 August with the heats and the semifinals and 6 August with the final.

== Records ==
Prior to the competition, the existing world and championship records were as follows.

World record	Liu Zige (CHN)	2:01.81	Jinan, China	21 October 2009
Competition record	Jessicah Schipper (AUS)	2:03.41	Rome, Italy	30 July 2009

== Results ==
=== Heats ===
The heats were held at 10:14.

Rank	Heat	Lane	Name	Nationality	Time	Notes
1	4	2	Zhang Yufei	China	2:06.92	Q, WJR
2	4	3	Katie McLaughlin	United States	2:07.32	Q
3	2	4	Liliána Szilágyi	Hungary	2:07.46	Q
4	4	5	Cammile Adams	United States	2:07.96	Q
5	3	5	Natsumi Hoshi	Japan	2:07.97	Q
6	3	3	Katinka Hosszú	Hungary	2:08.07	Q
7	4	4	Franziska Hentke	Germany	2:08.31	Q
8	3	7	Lara Grangeon	France	2:08.54	Q
9	3	4	Madeline Groves	Australia	2:08.65	Q
10	2	6	Zhou Yilin	China	2:08.76	Q
11	4	6	Audrey Lacroix	Canada	2:08.79	Q
12	2	3	Brianna Throssell	Australia	2:09.16	Q
13	4	7	Hannah Miley	Great Britain	2:09.44	Q
14	3	6	Park Jin-young	South Korea	2:09.62	Q
15	3	8	Anja Klinar	Slovenia	2:09.70	Q
16	2	7	Joanna Maranhão	Brazil	2:09.77	Q
17	3	2	Martina van Berkel	Switzerland	2:09.88	
18	2	5	Judit Ignacio Sorribes	Spain	2:09.93	
19	3	1	Aimee Willmott	Great Britain	2:10.07	
20	2	1	Park Soo-jin	South Korea	2:11.07	
21	4	1	Andreina Pinto	Venezuela	2:11.14	
22	2	2	Alessia Polieri	Italy	2:11.30	
23	1	5	Valerie Gruest	Guatemala	2:12.82	
24	4	8	Ana Monteiro	Portugal	2:12.87	
25	3	0	Barbora Závadová	Czech Republic	2:12.89	
26	3	9	Anna Ntountounaki	Greece	2:13.69	
27	2	0	Virginia Bardach	Argentina	2:13.76	
28	2	9	Ida Marko-Varga	Sweden	2:14.89	
29	1	4	Quah Ting Wen	Singapore	2:14.93	
30	4	9	Claudia Hufnagl	Austria	2:15.16	
31	1	2	Monalisa Lorenza	Indonesia	2:15.76	
32	1	3	Jessica Camposano	Colombia	2:16.40	
33	1	1	Estefania Urzúa	Chile	2:19.12	
34	1	6	Sutasinee Pankaew	Thailand	2:19.54	
35	4	0	Sharo Rodríguez	Mexico	2:19.60	
36	1	7	María Far Núñez	Panama	2:19.65	
37	2	8	Laura Arroyo	Mexico	2:20.04	
38	1	8	Noel Borshi	Albania	2:20.28	
39	1	0	Alsu Bayramova	Azerbaijan	2:26.27	

=== Semifinals ===
The semifinals were held at 18:25.

==== Semifinal 1 ====
Rank	Lane	Name	Nationality	Time	Notes
1	4	Katie McLaughlin	United States	2:07.52	Q
2	5	Cammile Adams	United States	2:07.57	Q
2	7	Brianna Throssell	Australia	2:07.57	Q
4	2	Zhou Yilin	China	2:07.69	Q
5	6	Lara Grangeon	France	2:08.67	
6	3	Katinka Hosszú	Hungary	2:08.91	
7	1	Park Jin-young	South Korea	2:09.21	
8	8	Joanna Maranhão	Brazil	2:09.69	

==== Semifinal 2 ====
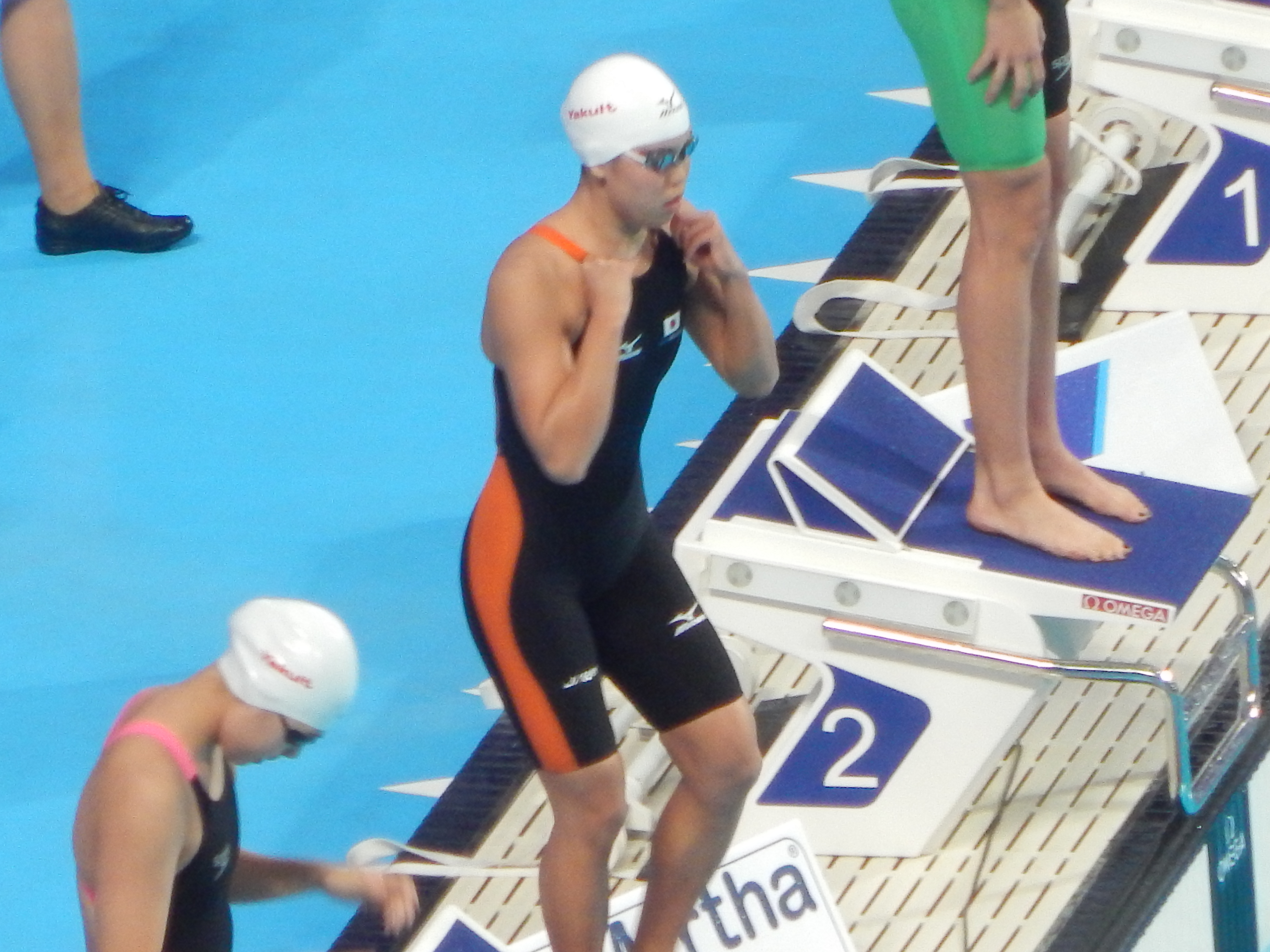
Hoshi wins 2nd semi

Rank	Lane	Name	Nationality	Time	Notes
1	3	Natsumi Hoshi	Japan	2:06.36	Q
2	6	Franziska Hentke	Germany	2:06.64	Q
3	5	Liliána Szilágyi	Hungary	2:07.05	Q
4	4	Zhang Yufei	China	2:07.08	Q
5	2	Madeline Groves	Australia	2:08.00	
6	8	Anja Klinar	Slovenia	2:08.52	
7	7	Audrey Lacroix	Canada	2:08.86	
8	1	Hannah Miley	Great Britain	2:09.21	

=== Final ===
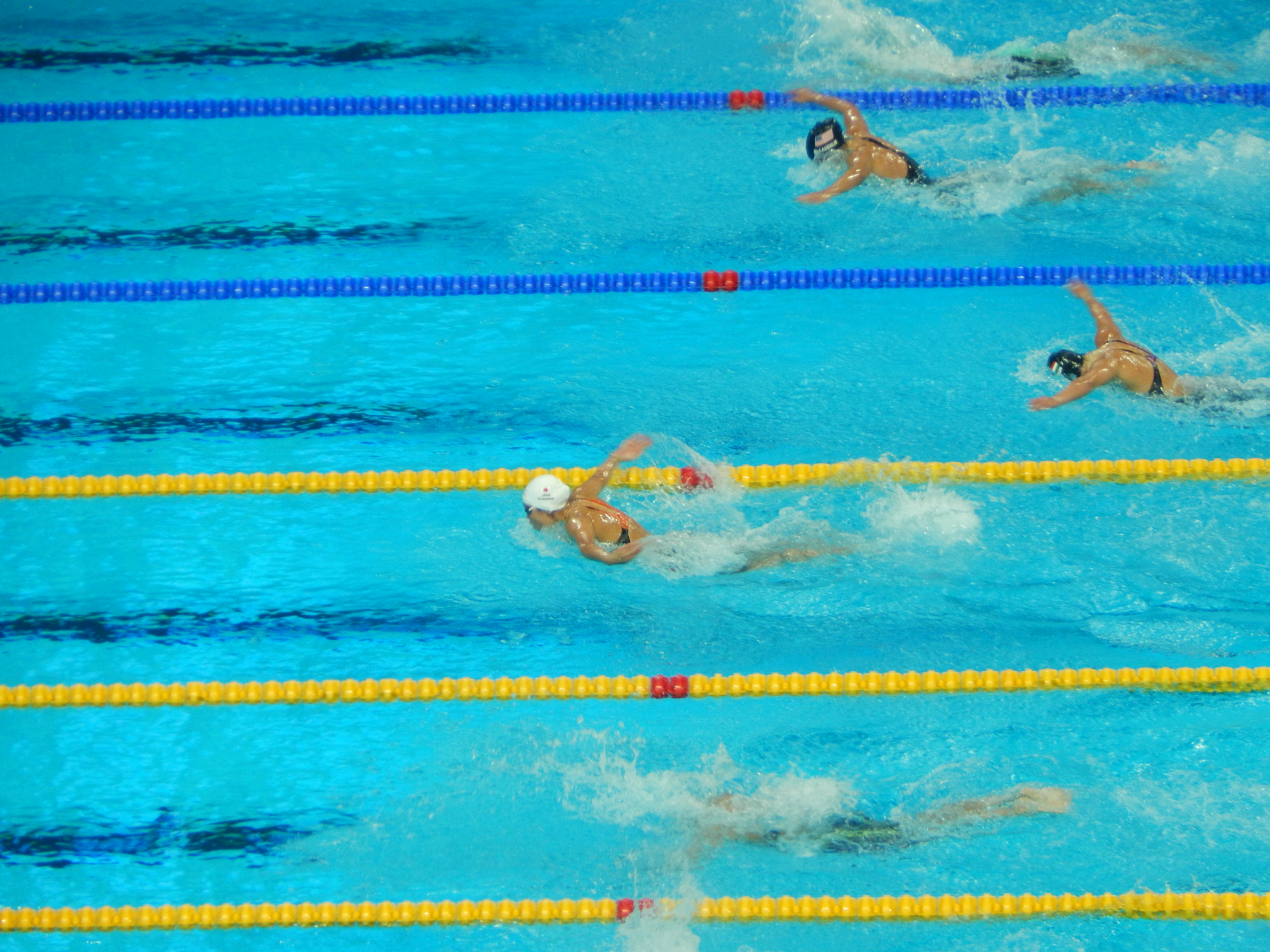
Hoshi swims for gold

The final was held at 18.20.

Rank	Lane	Name	Nationality	Time	Notes
1st place, gold medalist(s)	4	Natsumi Hoshi	Japan	2:05.56	
2nd place, silver medalist(s)	7	Cammile Adams	United States	2:06.40	
3rd place, bronze medalist(s)	6	Zhang Yufei	China	2:06.51	WJR
4	1	Brianna Throssell	Australia	2:06.78	
4	5	Franziska Hentke	Germany	2:06.78	
6	2	Katie McLaughlin	United States	2:06.95	
7	3	Liliána Szilágyi	Hungary	2:07.76	
8	8	Zhou Yilin	China	2:10.20	
