= Ukraine at the 2015 World Aquatics Championships =

- Flag of Ukraine
- World Aquatics code: UKR
- National federation: Ukrainian Swimming Federation
- Website: www.swimukraine.org.ua

in Kazan, Russia
- Competitors: 39 in 5 sports
- Medals Ranked 19th: Gold 0 Silver 2 Bronze 1 Total 3

World Aquatics Championships appearances
- 1994; 1998; 2001; 2003; 2005; 2007; 2009; 2011; 2013; 2015; 2017; 2019; 2022; 2023; 2024; 2025

Other related appearances
- Soviet Union (1973–1991)

Ukraine competed at the 2015 World Aquatics Championships in Kazan, Russia from 24 July to 9 August 2015.

== Medalists ==
Medal	Name	Sport	Event	Date
Silver	Illya Kvasha	Diving	Men's 1 m springboard	July 27
Silver	Oleksandr Horshkovozov; Iuliia Prokopchuk	Diving	Mixed team	July 29
Bronze	Lolita Ananasova; Anna Voloshyna	Synchronized swimming	Duet free routine	July 30

== 4th rankings ==
Ukraine was the team which achieved the 4th place the most among others (including the 5th position where were two bronze medalists):

Rank	Country	Number
1	Ukraine	12
2	Australia	9
3	United States	7
	Russia	7
5	China	5
	Great Britain	5
	Japan	5

== Diving ==
Ukrainian divers qualified for the individual spots and the synchronized teams at the World Championships.

Men

Athlete	Event	Preliminaries		Semifinals		Final	
Athlete	Event	Points	Rank	Points	Rank	Points	Rank
Oleh Kolodiy	1 m springboard	361.55	12 Q	—N/a		423.50	5
Illya Kvasha	1 m springboard	402.60	3 Q	—N/a		449.05	2nd place, silver medalist(s)
Oleh Kolodiy	3 m springboard	392.85	26	Did not advance			
Illya Kvasha	3 m springboard	492.85	3 Q	470.10	9 Q	469.75	8
Maksym Dolgov	10 m platform	424.80	19	Did not advance			
Oleksandr Horshkovozov; Illya Kvasha	3 m synchronized springboard	397.98	8 Q	—N/a		436.53	4
Maksym Dolgov; Oleksandr Horshkovozov	10 m synchronized platform	419.07	6 Q	—N/a		436.50	4

Women

Athlete	Event	Preliminaries		Semifinals		Final	
Athlete	Event	Points	Rank	Points	Rank	Points	Rank
Olena Fedorova	1 m springboard	257.55	7 Q	—N/a		286.95	4
Hanna Pysmenska	1 m springboard	237.70	18	—N/a		Did not advance	
Olena Fedorova	3 m springboard	307.20	8 Q	296.10	=11 Q	271.30	11
Anastasiya Nedobiga	3 m springboard	296.25	11 Q	297.45	10 Q	266.10	12
Hanna Krasnoshlyk	10 m platform	305.15	20	Did not advance			
Iuliia Prokopchuk	10 m platform	320.40	12 Q	337.05	9 Q	305.90	11
Viktoriya Kezar; Anastasiya Nedobiga	3 m synchronized springboard	281.49	6 Q	—N/a		302.85	4
Hanna Krasnoshlyk; Vlada Tatsenko	10 m synchronized platform	279.06	9 Q	—N/a		283.20	11

Mixed

Athlete	Event	Final	
Athlete	Event	Points	Rank
Oleksandr Horshkovozov; Iuliia Prokopchuk	Team	426.45	2nd place, silver medalist(s)

== High diving ==
Ukraine has qualified two high divers to compete at the World Championships.

Athlete	Event	Points	Rank
Anatoliy Shabotenko	Men's high diving	513.40	12
Diana Tomilina	Women's high diving	DNS	

== Open water swimming ==
Ukraine has qualified two open water swimmers to compete in each of the following events.

Athlete	Event	Time	Rank
Ihor Chervynskiy	Men's 5 km	55:32.2	24
Ihor Chervynskiy	Men's 10 km	1:50:57.3	25
Kyrylo Shvets	Men's 10 km	1:56:25.8	52
Ihor Snitko	Men's 5 km	55:31.7	21

== Swimming ==
Ukrainian swimmers have achieved qualifying standards in the following events (up to a maximum of 2 swimmers in each event at the A-standard entry time, and 1 at the B-standard):

Men

Athlete	Event	Heat		Semifinal		Final	
Athlete	Event	Time	Rank	Time	Rank	Time	Rank
Serhiy Frolov	400 m freestyle	3:53.64	42	—N/a		Did not advance	
Serhiy Frolov	800 m freestyle	8:02.17	25	—N/a		Did not advance	
Serhiy Frolov	1500 m freestyle	15:29.52	28	—N/a		Did not advance	
Andriy Hovorov	50 m freestyle	22.23	9 Q	21.93	7 Q	21.86	=5
Andriy Hovorov	100 m freestyle	49.81	36	Did not advance			
Andriy Hovorov	50 m butterfly	23.49	=9 Q	23.15	6 Q	23.18	5
Mykhailo Romanchuk	400 m freestyle	3:52.76	39	—N/a		Did not advance	
Mykhailo Romanchuk	1500 m freestyle	14:57.82	8 Q	—N/a		15:09.77	7
Illya Teslenko	200 m freestyle	1:49.87	38	Did not advance			
Vitalii Alpatov; Bogdan Plavin; Illya Teslenko; Andriy Hovorov	4 × 100 m freestyle relay	3:24.07	26	—N/a		Did not advance	
Illya Teslenko; Mykhailo Romanchuk; Serhiy Frolov; Anton Goncharov	4 × 200 m freestyle relay	7:21.74	19	—N/a		Did not advance	

Women

Athlete	Event	Heat		Semifinal		Final	
Athlete	Event	Time	Rank	Time	Rank	Time	Rank
Mariya Liver	50 m breaststroke	30.60	6 Q	30.64	5 Q	31.14	8
Mariya Liver	100 m breaststroke	1:09.10	29	Did not advance			
Anastasiya Malyavina	100 m breaststroke	1:12.77	48	Did not advance			
Anastasiya Malyavina	200 m breaststroke	2:36.49	41	Did not advance			
Daryna Zevina	50 m backstroke	28.97	28	Did not advance			
Daryna Zevina	100 m backstroke	1:01.68	32	Did not advance			
Daryna Zevina	200 m backstroke	2:12.14	20	Did not advance			

== Synchronized swimming ==
Ukraine fielded a full squad of twelve synchronized swimmers (one male and eleven female) to compete in each of the following events.

Women

Athlete	Event	Preliminaries		Final	
Athlete	Event	Points	Rank	Points	Rank
Anna Voloshyna	Solo technical routine	90.0364	4 Q	90.8912	4
Anna Voloshyna	Solo free routine	92.5333	4 Q	93.1333	4
Lolita Ananasova; Anna Voloshyna	Duet technical routine	90.2596	4 Q	91.6770	4
Lolita Ananasova; Anna Voloshyna	Duet free routine	93.0333	4 Q	93.6000	3rd place, bronze medalist(s)
Lolita Ananasova; Olena Grechykhina; Oleksandra Kashuba*; Kateryna Reznik*; Oleksandra Sabada; Kateryna Sadurska; Anastasiya Savchuk; Kseniya Sydorenko; Anna Voloshyna; Daria Iushko	Team technical routine	91.8720	3 Q	91.7690	4
Lolita Ananasova; Olena Grechykhina; Oleksandra Kashuba*; Kateryna Reznik*; Oleksandra Sabada; Kateryna Sadurska; Anastasiya Savchuk; Kseniya Sydorenko; Anna Voloshyna; Daria Iushko	Team free routine	92.7333	4 Q	93.7000	4
Lolita Ananasova; Olena Grechykhina; Oleksandra Kashuba; Kateryna Reznik; Oleksandra Sabada; Kateryna Sadurska; Anastasiya Savchuk; Kseniya Sydorenko; Anna Voloshyna; Daria Iushko; Olha Zolotarova*	Free routine combination	92.4000	4 Q	93.4000	4

Mixed

Athlete	Event	Preliminaries		Final	
Athlete	Event	Points	Rank	Points	Rank
Anton Timofeiev; Oleksandra Sabada	Duet technical routine	84.0767	4 Q	83.7653	4
Anton Timofeiev; Kateryna Reznik	Duet free routine	85.5667	6 Q	85.1333	6
