= Swimming at the 2015 World Aquatics Championships – Men's 200 metre butterfly =

Men's 200 metre butterfly at the 2015 World Aquatics Championships
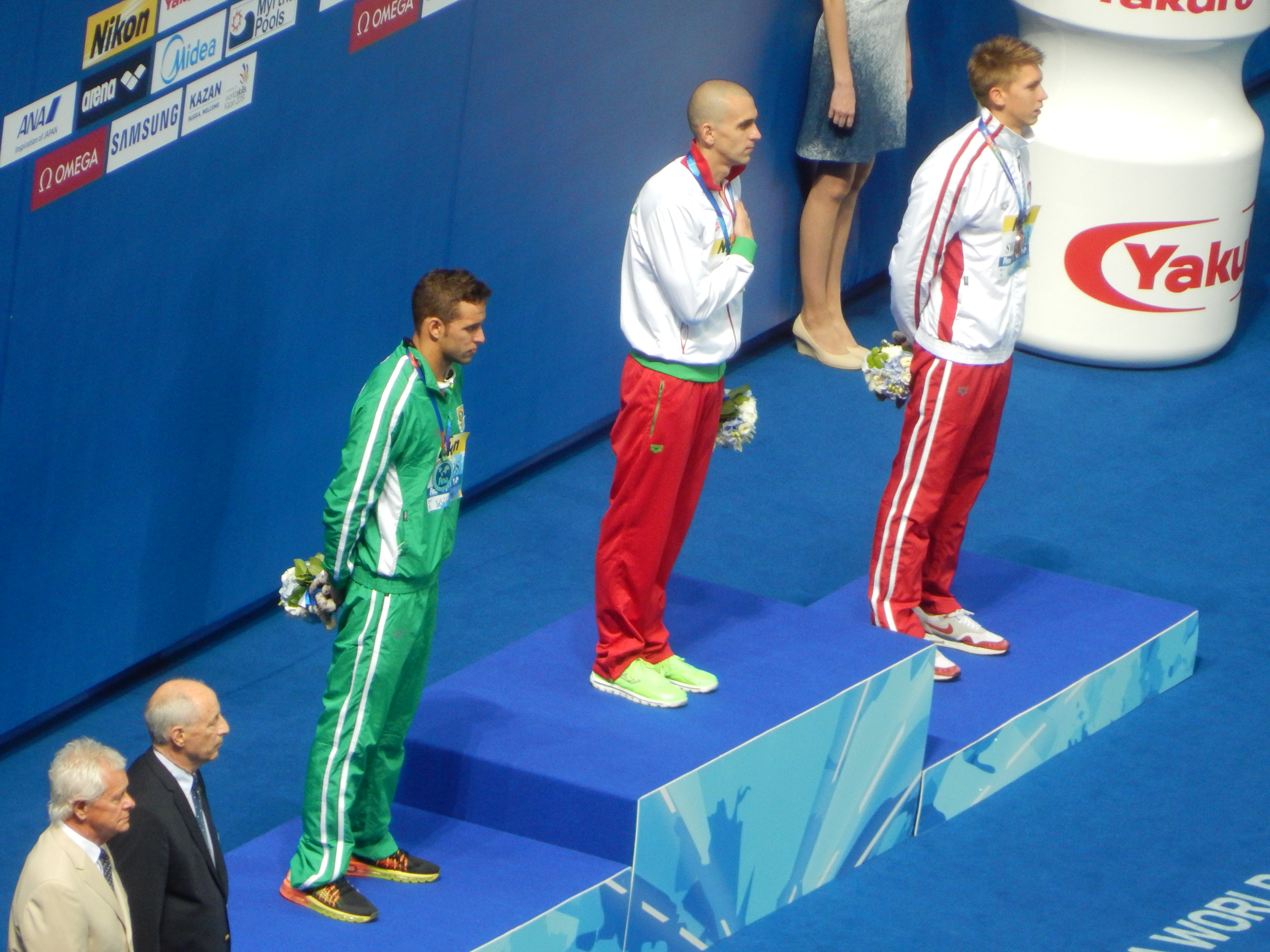
- Victory Ceremony
- Dates: 4 August (heats and semifinals); 5 August (final)
- Competitors: 40 from 33 nations
- Winning time: 1:53.48

Medalists
gold medal	László Cseh	Hungary
silver medal	Chad le Clos	South Africa
bronze medal	Jan Świtkowski	Poland

The Men's 200 metre butterfly competition of the swimming events at the 2015 World Aquatics Championships was held on 4 August with the heats and the semifinals and 5 August with the final.

== Records ==
Prior to the competition, the existing world and championship records were as follows.

World record	Michael Phelps (USA)	1:51.51	Rome, Italy	29 July 2009
Competition record	Michael Phelps (USA)	1:51.51	Rome, Italy	29 July 2009

== Results ==
=== Heats ===
The heats were held at 10:15.

Rank	Heat	Lane	Name	Nationality	Time	Notes
1	3	4	László Cseh	Hungary	1:53.71	Q
2	3	3	Viktor Bromer	Denmark	1:54.47	Q, NR
3	4	4	Daiya Seto	Japan	1:55.60	Q
4	4	3	Jan Świtkowski	Poland	1:55.78	Q
5	2	5	Leonardo de Deus	Brazil	1:55.83	Q
6	2	3	Tyler Clary	United States	1:55.86	Q
7	4	5	Masato Sakai	Japan	1:55.97	Q
8	4	2	David Morgan	Australia	1:56.05	Q
9	3	5	Tom Shields	United States	1:56.12	Q
10	2	7	Stefanos Dimitriadis	Greece	1:56.23	Q, NR
11	3	7	Sebastien Rousseau	South Africa	1:56.29	Q
12	4	6	Louis Croenen	Belgium	1:56.33	Q
13	3	6	Joseph Schooling	Singapore	1:56.85	Q
14	2	4	Chad le Clos	South Africa	1:56.92	Q
14	2	6	Grant Irvine	Australia	1:56.92	Q
16	4	8	Alexander Kunert	Germany	1:57.28	Q
17	2	0	Jan Šefl	Czech Republic	1:57.63	
18	3	2	Francesco Pavone	Italy	1:57.69	
19	4	7	Evgeny Koptelov	Russia	1:58.06	
20	2	1	Wang Pudong	China	1:58.20	
21	4	1	Quah Zheng Wen	Singapore	1:58.32	
22	3	0	Alexandru Coci	Romania	1:58.43	
23	2	8	Robert Žbogar	Slovenia	1:58.55	
24	4	0	Nils Liess	Switzerland	1:58.76	
25	3	1	Hao Yun	China	1:59.04	
26	2	2	Aleksandr Kudashev	Russia	1:59.33	
27	3	9	Gal Nevo	Israel	1:59.45	
28	4	9	Marcos Lavado	Venezuela	1:59.85	
29	1	5	Esnaider Reales	Colombia	2:01.13	
30	3	8	Nuno Quintanilha	Portugal	2:01.46	
31	1	3	Sajan Prakash	India	2:01.63	
32	1	6	Jessie Lacuna	Philippines	2:03.84	
33	1	4	Bradlee Ashby	New Zealand	2:04.31	
34	2	9	Hsu Chi-chieh	Chinese Taipei	2:04.48	
35	1	2	Ayman Kelzi	Syria	2:04.60	
36	1	8	Mihajlo Čeprkalo	Bosnia and Herzegovina	2:05.64	
37	1	7	Teimuraz Kobakhidze	Georgia	2:06.19	
38	1	1	Nouamane Batahi	Morocco	2:07.54	
39	1	0	Aldo Castillo	Bolivia	2:15.38	
40	1	9	Noah Al-Khulaifi	Qatar	2:26.71	

=== Semifinals ===
The semifinals were held on 4 August at 19:04.

==== Semifinal 1 ====
Rank	Lane	Name	Nationality	Time	Notes
1	1	Chad le Clos	South Africa	1:54.50	Q
2	4	Viktor Bromer	Denmark	1:54.82	Q
3	5	Jan Świtkowski	Poland	1:55.42	Q
4	7	Louis Croenen	Belgium	1:55.49	Q
5	2	Stefanos Dimitriadis	Greece	1:56.31	
6	3	Tyler Clary	United States	1:56.47	
7	8	Alexander Kunert	Germany	1:57.29	
8	6	David Morgan	Australia	1:58.83	

==== Semifinal 2 ====
Rank	Lane	Name	Nationality	Time	Notes
1	4	László Cseh	Hungary	1:53.53	Q
2	6	Masato Sakai	Japan	1:54.75	Q
3	5	Daiya Seto	Japan	1:54.95	Q
4	2	Tom Shields	United States	1:55.75	Q
5	3	Leonardo de Deus	Brazil	1:56.02	
6	1	Joseph Schooling	Singapore	1:56.11	
7	7	Sebastien Rousseau	South Africa	1:56.96	
8	8	Grant Irvine	Australia	1:57.94	

=== Final ===
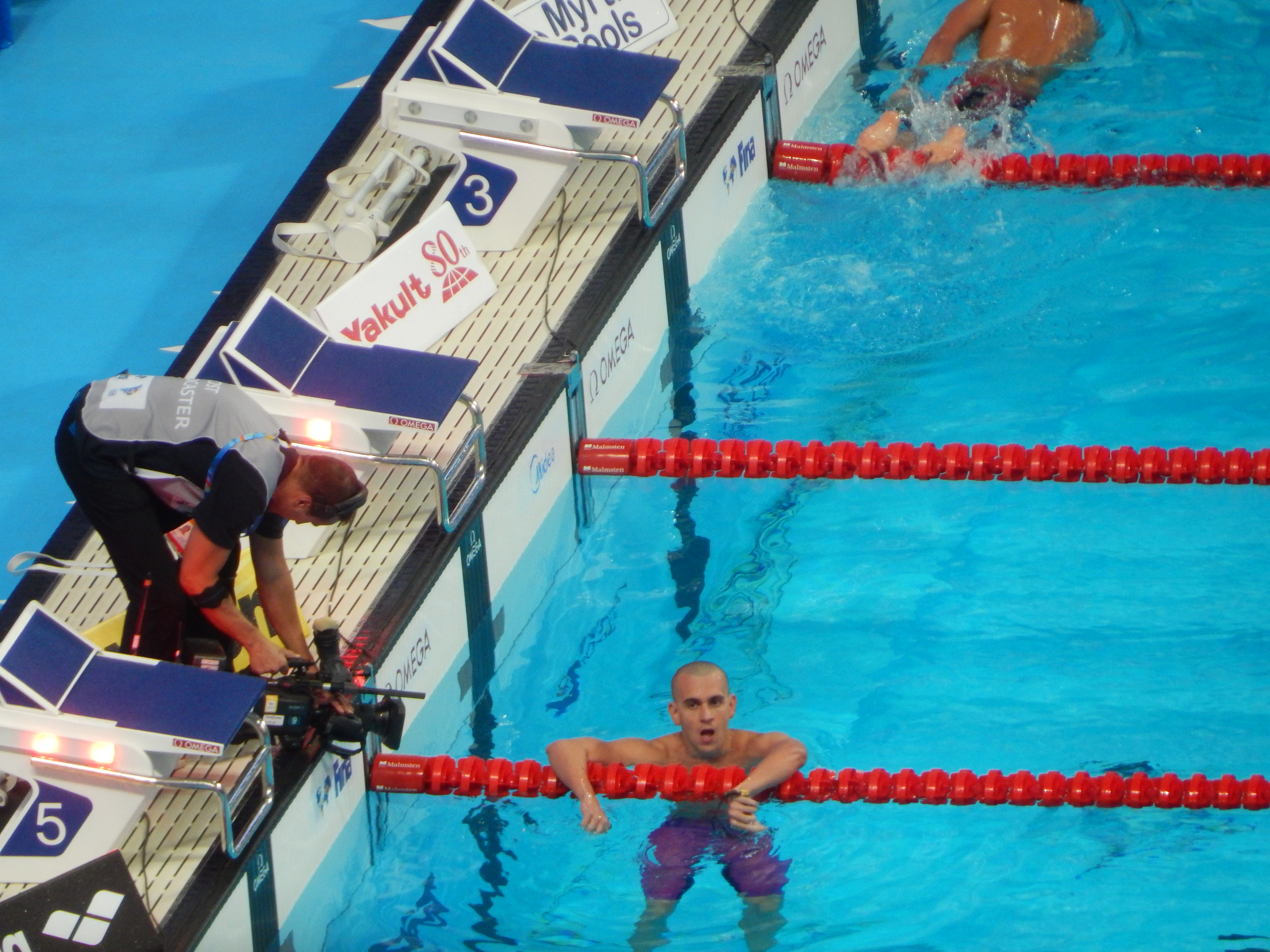
László Cseh wins gold

The final was held at 17:52.

Rank	Lane	Name	Nationality	Time	Notes
1st place, gold medalist(s)	4	László Cseh	Hungary	1:53.48	
2nd place, silver medalist(s)	5	Chad le Clos	South Africa	1:53.68	
3rd place, bronze medalist(s)	7	Jan Świtkowski	Poland	1:54.10	
4	3	Masato Sakai	Japan	1:54.24	
5	6	Viktor Bromer	Denmark	1:54.66	
6	2	Daiya Seto	Japan	1:55.16	
7	1	Louis Croenen	Belgium	1:55.39	NR
8	8	Tom Shields	United States	1:56.17	
