= Colombia at the 2015 World Aquatics Championships =

- Flag of Colombia
- FINA code: COL
- National federation: Federación Colombiana de Natación
- Website: fecna.com.co

in Kazan, Russia
- Competitors: 19 in 4 sports
- Medals: Gold 0 Silver 0 Bronze 0 Total 0

World Aquatics Championships appearances
- 1973; 1975; 1978; 1982; 1986; 1991; 1994; 1998; 2001; 2003; 2005; 2007; 2009; 2011; 2013; 2015; 2017; 2019; 2022; 2023; 2024

Colombia competed at the 2015 World Aquatics Championships in Kazan, Russia from 24 July to 9 August 2015.

== Diving ==
Colombian divers qualified for the individual spots and the synchronized teams at the World Championships.

Men

Athlete	Event	Preliminaries		Semifinals		Final	
Athlete	Event	Points	Rank	Points	Rank	Points	Rank
Sebastián Morales	1 m springboard	363.70	11 Q	—		387.35	12
Miguel Reyes	1 m springboard	277.80	34	—		did not advance	
Sebastián Morales	3 m springboard	364.75	34	did not advance			
Miguel Reyes	3 m springboard	326.10	44	did not advance			
Víctor Ortega	10 m platform	373.60	30	did not advance			
Sebastián Villa	10 m platform	384.80	27	did not advance			
Sebastián Morales; Sebastián Villa	3 m synchronized springboard	362.19	16	—		did not advance	
Víctor Ortega; Juan Ríos Lopera	10 m synchronized platform	409.92	8 Q	—		405.03	8

Women

Athlete	Event	Preliminaries		Semifinals		Final	
Athlete	Event	Points	Rank	Points	Rank	Points	Rank
Diana Pineda	1 m springboard	241.05	14	—		did not advance	
Diana Pineda	3 m springboard	264.90	22	did not advance			
Sara Peréz	10 m platform	233.25	35	did not advance			

Mixed

Athlete	Event	Final	
Athlete	Event	Points	Rank
Sebastián Villa; Diana Pineda	3 m synchronized springboard	266.22	12

== High diving ==
Colombia has qualified two high divers at the World Championships.

Athlete	Event	Points	Rank
Orlando Duque	Men's high diving	571.55	6
Miguel García	Men's high diving	545.45	9

== Swimming ==
Colombian swimmers have achieved qualifying standards in the following events (up to a maximum of 2 swimmers in each event at the A-standard entry time, and 1 at the B-standard):

Men

Athlete	Event	Heat		Semifinal		Final	
Athlete	Event	Time	Rank	Time	Rank	Time	Rank
Mateo de Angulo	200 m freestyle	1:51.49	50	did not advance			
Mateo de Angulo	400 m freestyle	3:57.01	48	—		did not advance	
Mateo de Angulo	1500 m freestyle	DNS		—		did not advance	
Jorge Murillo	50 m breaststroke	27.99	=23	did not advance			
Jorge Murillo	100 m breaststroke	1:00.67	21	did not advance			
Jorge Murillo	200 m breaststroke	2:14.92	32	did not advance			
Omar Pinzón	50 m backstroke	26.27	39	did not advance			
Omar Pinzón	100 m backstroke	55.90	38	did not advance			
Omar Pinzón	200 m backstroke	1:59.24	22	did not advance			
Omar Pinzón	200 m individual medley	2:02.80	24	did not advance			
Esnaider Reales	100 m butterfly	54.63	48	did not advance			
Esnaider Reales	200 m butterfly	2:01.13	29	did not advance			
Omar Pinzón; Jorge Murillo; Esnaider Reales; Mateo de Angulo	4 × 100 m medley relay	3:41.44	20	—		did not advance	

Women

Athlete	Event	Heat		Semifinal		Final	
Athlete	Event	Time	Rank	Time	Rank	Time	Rank
María Álvarez	400 m freestyle	4:14.60 NR	24	—		did not advance	
María Álvarez	800 m freestyle	8:42.14 NR	23	—		did not advance	
Isabella Arcila	50 m freestyle	25.83	36	did not advance			
Isabella Arcila	100 m freestyle	56.41	41	did not advance			
Jessica Camposano	200 m freestyle	2:01.81	=36	did not advance			
Jessica Camposano	100 m butterfly	1:00.42	37	did not advance			
Jessica Camposano	200 m butterfly	2:16.40	32	did not advance			
Carolina Colorado Henao	50 m backstroke	29.61	35	did not advance			
Carolina Colorado Henao	100 m backstroke	1:03.26	42	did not advance			
Carolina Colorado Henao	200 m backstroke	2:15.55	31	did not advance			
Isabella Arcila; Carolina Colorado Henao; María Álvarez; Jessica Camposano	4 × 100 m freestyle relay	3:46.15 NR	17	—		did not advance	
Jessica Camposano; Isabella Arcila; Carolina Colorado Henao; María Álvarez	4 × 200 m freestyle relay	8:19.04 NR	16	—		did not advance	

Mixed

Athlete	Event	Heat		Final	
Athlete	Event	Time	Rank	Time	Rank
Omar Pinzón; Jorge Murillo; Jessica Camposano; Isabella Arcila	4 × 100 m medley relay	3:55.42	12	did not advance	

== Synchronized swimming ==
Colombia has qualified two synchronized swimmers to compete in each of the following events.

Athlete	Event	Preliminaries		Final	
Athlete	Event	Points	Rank	Points	Rank
Estefanía Álvarez; Mónica Arango	Duet technical routine	77.9068	22	did not advance	
Estefanía Álvarez; Mónica Arango	Duet free routine	79.1667	20	did not advance	
