= Venezuela at the 2015 World Aquatics Championships =

- Flag of Venezuela
- World Aquatics code: VEN
- National federation: Federación Venezolana de Deportes Acuáticos
- Website: www.feveda.com.ve

in Kazan, Russia
- Competitors: 34 in 4 sports
- Medals: Gold 0 Silver 0 Bronze 0 Total 0

World Aquatics Championships appearances
- 1973; 1975; 1978; 1982; 1986; 1991; 1994; 1998; 2001; 2003; 2005; 2007; 2009; 2011; 2013; 2015; 2017; 2019; 2022; 2023; 2024; 2025

Venezuela competed at the 2015 World Aquatics Championships in Kazan, Russia from 24 July to 9 August 2015.

== Diving ==
Venezuelan divers qualified for the individual spots and the synchronized teams at the World Championships.

Men

Athlete	Event	Preliminaries		Semifinals		Final	
Athlete	Event	Points	Rank	Points	Rank	Points	Rank
Jesús Liranzo	1 m springboard	256.45	35	—		Did not advance	
Alfredo Colmenarez	3 m springboard	324.70	45	Did not advance			
Robert Páez	3 m springboard	276.35	55	Did not advance			
Óscar Ariza	10 m platform	336.80	37	Did not advance			
Jesús Liranzo	10 m platform	399.30	23	Did not advance			
Óscar Ariza; Robert Páez	10 m synchronized platform	344.70	17	—		Did not advance	

Women

Athlete	Event	Preliminaries		Semifinals		Final	
Athlete	Event	Points	Rank	Points	Rank	Points	Rank
María Betancourt	1 m springboard	201.65	33	—		Did not advance	
María Betancourt	3 m springboard	193.05	46	Did not advance			

== Open water swimming ==
Venezuela fielded a full team of five swimmers to compete in the open water marathon.

Athlete	Event	Time	Rank
Wilder Carreño	Men's 5 km	56:04.3	33
Erwin Maldonado	Men's 10 km	1:51:19.1	27
Erwin Maldonado	Men's 25 km	4:56:00.4	5
Diego Vera	Men's 10 km	1:52:58.9	39
Liliana Hernández	Women's 10 km	2:07:13.0	42
Paola Pérez	Women's 10 km	2:05:31.5	39
Wilder Carreño; Erwin Maldonado; Paola Pérez	Mixed team	58:39.3	16

== Swimming ==
Venezuelan swimmers have achieved qualifying standards in the following events (up to a maximum of 2 swimmers in each event at the A-standard entry time, and 1 at the B-standard):

Men

Athlete	Event	Heat		Semifinal		Final	
Athlete	Event	Time	Rank	Time	Rank	Time	Rank
Andy Arteta	800 m freestyle	8:19.39	39	—		Did not advance	
Carlos Claverie	50 m breaststroke	28.12	29	Did not advance			
Carlos Claverie	100 m breaststroke	1:01.63	31	Did not advance			
Carlos Claverie	200 m breaststroke	2:12.33	20	Did not advance			
Alejandro Gómez	1500 m freestyle	15:32.75	32	—		Did not advance	
Marcos Lavado	200 m butterfly	1:59.85	28	Did not advance			
Carlos Omaña	200 m backstroke	1:59.59	23	Did not advance			
Carlos Omaña	200 m individual medley	2:03.54	27	Did not advance			
Carlos Omaña	400 m individual medley	4:20.74	23	—		Did not advance	
Cristian Quintero	50 m freestyle	22.94	36	Did not advance			
Cristian Quintero	100 m freestyle	49.46	25	Did not advance			
Cristian Quintero	200 m freestyle	1:48.55	27	Did not advance			
Cristian Quintero	400 m freestyle	3:50.89	24	—		Did not advance	
Albert Subirats	50 m backstroke	26.07	34	Did not advance			
Albert Subirats	100 m backstroke	DNS		Did not advance			
Albert Subirats	50 m butterfly	24.13	=28	Did not advance			
Albert Subirats	100 m butterfly	53.68	=35	Did not advance			
Cristian Quintero; Albert Subirats; Daniele Tirabassi; Jesús López	4×100 m freestyle relay	3:21.80	23	—		Did not advance	
Cristian Quintero; Marcos Lavado; Daniele Tirabassi; Andy Arteta	4×200 m freestyle relay	7:25.13	22	—		Did not advance	
Carlos Omaña; Carlos Claverie; Albert Subirats; Cristian Quintero	4×100 m medley relay	DSQ		—		Did not advance	

Women

Athlete	Event	Heat		Semifinal		Final	
Athlete	Event	Time	Rank	Time	Rank	Time	Rank
Isabella Páez	100 m butterfly	1:00.58	38	Did not advance			
Andreína Pinto	400 m freestyle	4:09.75	15	—		Did not advance	
Andreína Pinto	800 m freestyle	8:33.33	12	—		Did not advance	
Andreína Pinto	200 m butterfly	2:11.14	21	Did not advance			
Jeserik Pinto	50 m butterfly	27.70	39	Did not advance			
Arlene Semeco	50 m freestyle	25.98	41	Did not advance			
Mercedes Toledo	50 m breaststroke	31.88	30	Did not advance			
Mercedes Toledo	100 m breaststroke	1:10.70	=39	Did not advance			
Mercedes Toledo	200 m breaststroke	2:32.69	34	Did not advance			
Jeserik Pinto; Mercedes Toledo; Isabella Paéz; Arlene Semeco	4×100 m medley relay	4:11.74	22	—		Did not advance	

== Synchronized swimming ==
Venezuela fielded a full squad of ten synchronized swimmers to compete in each of the following events.

Athlete	Event	Preliminaries		Final	
Athlete	Event	Points	Rank	Points	Rank
Karla Loaiza	Solo technical routine	70.1050	22	Did not advance	
María Laura Villasana	Solo free routine	74.2333	20	Did not advance	
Oriana Carillo; Greisy Gómez	Duet technical routine	71.0905	32	Did not advance	
Oriana Carillo; Greisy Gómez	Duet free routine	73.2667	29	Did not advance	
Laumeth Araque; Valeria Bermúdez*; Patricia Camaran*; Oriana Carillo; Greisy Gómez; Karla Loaiza; Stephanie Murrillo; Lilia Núñez; Wendy Rodríguez; María Laura Villasana	Team technical routine	72.1466	18	Did not advance	
Laumeth Araque; Valeria Bermúdez; Patricia Camaran*; Oriana Carillo; Greisy Gómez; Karla Loaiza; Stephanie Murrillo; Lilia Núñez*; Wendy Rodríguez; María Laura Villasana	Team free routine	72.2333	18	Did not advance	
Laumeth Araque; Valeria Bermúdez; Patricia Camaran; Oriana Carillo; Greisy Gómez; Karla Loaiza; Stephanie Murrillo; Lilia Núñez; Wendy Rodríguez; María Laura Villasana	Free routine combination	75.1000	15	Did not advance	
