= Diving at the 2015 World Aquatics Championships – Men's 3 metre springboard =

Men's 3 metre springboard at the 2015 World Aquatics Championships
- Dates: 30–31 July
- Competitors: 61 from 38 nations
- Winning points: 555.05

Medalists
gold medal	He Chao	China
silver medal	Ilya Zakharov	Russia
bronze medal	Jack Laugher	Great Britain

The Men's 3 metre springboard competition of the diving events at the 2015 World Aquatics Championships was held on 30–31 July 2015.

== Results ==
The preliminary round was held on 30 July at 09:30. The semifinal was held on 30 July at 15:00. The final was held on 31 July at 19:30.

Green denotes finalists

Blue denotes semifinalists

Rank	Diver	Nationality	Preliminary		Semifinal		Final	
Rank	Diver	Nationality	Points	Rank	Points	Rank	Points	Rank
1st place, gold medalist(s)	He Chao	China	515.30	2	527.95	2	555.05	1
2nd place, silver medalist(s)	Ilya Zakharov	Russia	474.00	4	524.30	3	547.60	2
3rd place, bronze medalist(s)	Jack Laugher	Great Britain	450.80	7	490.90	5	528.90	3
4	Cao Yuan	China	517.40	1	540.80	1	523.95	4
5	Evgeny Kuznetsov	Russia	470.15	5	499.80	4	516.90	5
6	Rommel Pacheco	Mexico	430.10	11	483.15	7	508.15	6
7	Woo Ha-ram	South Korea	423.80	13	450.90	12	491.50	7
8	Illya Kvasha	Ukraine	492.85	3	470.10	9	469.75	8
9	Ken Terauchi	Japan	440.25	9	463.25	10	468.15	9
10	Matthieu Rosset	France	423.85	12	488.25	6	460.55	10
11	James Connor	Australia	431.85	10	457.10	11	422.35	11
12	Patrick Hausding	Germany	468.25	6	472.80	8	67.50	12
13	Michael Hixon	United States	421.70	14	441.10	13		
14	César Castro	Brazil	419.30	17	430.30	14		
15	Chris Mears	Great Britain	419.20	18	422.50	15		
16	Grant Nel	Australia	450.30	8	412.45	16		
17	Constantin Blaha	Austria	421.65	15	407.20	17		
18	Philippe Gagné	Canada	421.45	16	381.00	18		
19	Stephan Feck	Germany	418.30	19				
20	Kim Yeong-nam	South Korea	416.85	20				
21	Liam Stone	New Zealand	413.10	21				
22	Sho Sakai	Japan	411.10	22				
23	Ian Matos	Brazil	403.85	23				
24	Ahmad Azman	Malaysia	401.25	24				
25	Guillaume Dutoit	Switzerland	399.45	25				
26	Oleg Kolodiy	Ukraine	392.85	26				
27	Ooi Tze Liang	Malaysia	391.35	27				
28	Jouni Kallunki	Finland	391.20	28				
29	Yahel Castillo	Mexico	390.35	29				
30	Tommaso Rinaldi	Italy	382.10	30				
31	Darian Schmidt	United States	380.95	31				
32	François Imbeau-Dulac	Canada	377.20	32				
33	Chola Chanturia	Georgia	371.30	33				
34	Sebastián Morales	Colombia	364.75	34				
35	Michele Benedetti	Italy	364.00	35				
36	Andrzej Rzeszutek	Poland	359.70	36				
37	Yona Knight-Wisdom	Jamaica	356.30	37				
38	Jesper Tolvers	Sweden	356.10	38				
39	Donato Neglia	Chile	354.65	39				
40	Diego Carquin	Chile	347.70	40				
41	Yauheni Karaliou	Belarus	341.10	41				
42	Stefanos Paparounas	Greece	340.90	42				
43	Nicolás García	Spain	328.55	43				
44	Miguel Reyes	Colombia	326.10	44				
45	Alfredo Colmenarez	Venezuela	324.70	45				
46	Espen Bergslien	Norway	321.05	46				
47	Mohab El-Kordy	Egypt	320.25	47				
48	Abdulrahman Abbas	Kuwait	320.05	48				
49	Frandiel Gómez	Dominican Republic	318.60	49				
50	Adityo Putra	Indonesia	316.70	50				
51	Kacper Lesiak	Poland	314.55	51				
52	Emadeldin Abdellatif	Egypt	313.50	52				
53	Arturo Valdes	Cuba	290.95	53				
54	Botond Bóta	Hungary	282.05	54				
55	Robert Páez	Venezuela	276.35	55				
56	Héctor García	Spain	274.10	56				
57	Doston Botirov	Uzbekistan	272.80	57				
58	Ian-Soren Cabioch	Monaco	261.35	58				
59	Aleksandre Gujabidze	Georgia	249.80	59				
60	Hasan Qali	Kuwait	237.75	60				
61	Tri Anggoro Priambodo	Indonesia	219.90	61				
