= Switzerland at the 2023 World Aquatics Championships =

- Flag of Switzerland
- FINA code: SUI
- National federation: Swiss Swimming Federation

in Fukuoka, Japan
- Competitors: 16 in 4 sports
- Medals Ranked 26th: Gold 0 Silver 0 Bronze 1 Total 1

World Aquatics Championships appearances
- 1973; 1975; 1978; 1982; 1986; 1991; 1994; 1998; 2001; 2003; 2005; 2007; 2009; 2011; 2013; 2015; 2017; 2019; 2022; 2023; 2024

Switzerland competed at the 2023 World Aquatics Championships in Fukuoka, Japan from 14 to 30 July.

== Medalists ==
Medal	Name	Sport	Event	Date
Bronze	Roman Mityukov	Swimming	Men's 200 m backstroke	July 28

== Athletes by discipline ==
The following is the list of number of competitors participating at the Championships per discipline.

Sport	Men	Women	Total
Diving	3	1	4
High diving	2	1	3
Open water swimming	1	0	1
Swimming	6	2	8
Total	12	4	16

== Diving ==
Switzerland entered 4 divers.

Men

Athlete	Event	Preliminaries		Semifinals		Final	
Athlete	Event	Points	Rank	Points	Rank	Points	Rank
Thibaud Bucher	1 m springboard	231.75	58	—		Did not advance	
Guillaume Dutoit	3 m springboard	348.75	36	Did not advance			
Jonathan Suckow	1 m springboard	369.00	6 Q	—		349.40	12
Jonathan Suckow	3 m springboard	385.95	15 Q	369.10	18	Did not advance	
Jonathan Suckow; Guillaume Dutoit	3 m synchro springboard	342.69	12 Q	—		372.33	8

Women

Athlete	Event	Preliminaries		Semifinals		Final	
Athlete	Event	Points	Rank	Points	Rank	Points	Rank
Michelle Heimberg	1 m springboard	251.90	4 Q	—		258.35	8
Michelle Heimberg	3 m springboard	271.85	22	Did not advance			

== High diving ==
Athlete	Event	Points	Rank
Matthias Appenzeller	Men's high diving	315.30	14
Jean-David Duval	Men's high diving	222.20	21
Morgane Herculano	Women's high diving	196.30	18

== Open water swimming ==
Switzerland entered 1 open water swimmer.

Men

Athlete	Event	Time	Rank
Christian Schreiber	Men's 5 km	56:48.9	18
Christian Schreiber	Men's 10 km	1:54:11.5	26

== Swimming ==
Switzerland entered 8 swimmers.

Men

Athlete	Event	Heat		Semifinal		Final	
Athlete	Event	Time	Rank	Time	Rank	Time	Rank
Jérémy Desplanches	100 metre breaststroke	1:00.95	23	Did not advance			
Jérémy Desplanches	200 metre individual medley	1:58.00	4 Q	1:58.29	14	Did not advance	
Antonio Djakovic	200 metre freestyle	1:46.70	16 Q	1:46.66	14	Did not advance	
Antonio Djakovic	400 metre freestyle	3:45.43	8 Q	—		3:44.22	6
Nils Liess	100 metre freestyle	50.24	48	Did not advance			
Roman Mityukov	50 metre backstroke	25.61	31	Did not advance			
Roman Mityukov	100 metre backstroke	53.57	6 Q	53.32	10	Did not advance	
Roman Mityukov	200 metre backstroke	1:57.24	2 Q	1:55.85 NR	1 Q	1:55.34 NR	3rd place, bronze medalist(s)
Noè Ponti	50 metre butterfly	23.13	5 Q	23.26	13	Did not advance	
Noè Ponti	100 metre butterfly	51.00	4 Q	51.17	8 Q	51.23	7
Noè Ponti	200 metre butterfly	1:55.85	12 Q	1:55.44	11	Did not advance	
Marius Toscan	400 metre individual medley	4:21.24	17	—		Did not advance	
Antonio Djakovic; Roman Mityukov; Noe Ponti; Nils Liess	4 × 200 m freestyle relay	7:10.87	14	—		Did not advance	
Roman Mityukov; Jérémy Desplanches; Noè Ponti; Antonio Djakovic	4 × 100 m medley relay	3:35.46 NR	15	—		Did not advance	

Women

Athlete	Event	Heat		Semifinal		Final	
Athlete	Event	Time	Rank	Time	Rank	Time	Rank
Nina Kost	50 metre freestyle	25.80	39	Did not advance			
Nina Kost	100 metre freestyle	56.60	32	Did not advance			
Nina Kost	50 metre backstroke	29.00	33	Did not advance			
Nina Kost	100 metre backstroke	1:02.03	31	Did not advance			
Lisa Mamié	50 metre breaststroke	31.67	30	Did not advance			
Lisa Mamié	100 metre breaststroke	1:06.87	16 Q	1:06.97	13	Did not advance	
Lisa Mamié	200 metre breaststroke	2:26.55	15 Q	2:24.84	11	Did not advance	
