= Julia Vincent =

South African diver

Personal information
- Born: 13 August 1994 (age 31) Johannesburg, South Africa
- Height: 154 cm (5 ft 1 in)
- Weight: 57 kg (126 lb)

Sport
- Sport: Diving
- University team: South Carolina Gamecocks
- Updated on 30 August 2015

Julia Catherine Vincent (born 13 August 1994) is a South African professional female diver.

She competed at the 2015 World Aquatics Championships. She was a student-athlete at the University of South Carolina and qualified for the 2016 Summer Olympics in the 3-meter springboard. At the 2016 Summer Olympics, she finished in 29th place in the preliminary and did not advance to the semifinals. She also qualified for the 2020 Summer Olympics in the 3-meter springboard.

== See also ==
- South Africa at the 2015 World Aquatics Championships
