= Micaela Bouter =

South African diver (born 1995)

Personal information
- Nationality: South African
- Born: 27 October 1995 (age 30) Johannesburg, South Africa

Sport
- Sport: Diving
- University team: Houston Cougars

Micaela Bouter (born 27 October 1995) is a South African diver. She competed in the women's 3 metre springboard event at the 2019 World Aquatics Championships. She finished in 35th place in the preliminary round. She attended and competed in diving at the University of Houston. In July 2021, she qualified for the 2020 Summer Olympics in the women's 3 metre springboard, representing South Africa.
