= Sophie Giger =

Swiss synchronized swimmer

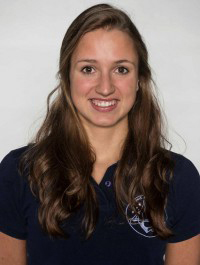
- Giger in 2016

Personal information
- Born: 21 December 1995 (age 30)

Sport
- Country: Switzerland
- Sport: Synchronized swimming

Sophie Giger (born 21 December 1995) is a Swiss synchronized swimmer. She competed in the women's duet at the 2016 Summer Olympics.
