= Sascia Kraus =

Swiss synchronized swimmer

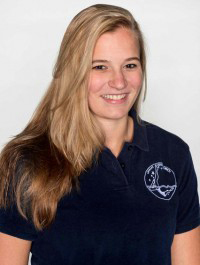

Personal information
- Born: 3 March 1993 (age 33)

Sport
- Country: Switzerland
- Sport: Synchronized swimming
- Club: Limmat Nixen

Sascia Kraus (born 3 March 1993) is a Swiss synchronized swimmer. She competed in the women's duet at the 2016 Summer Olympics.
