= Palestine at the 2025 World Aquatics Championships =

- Flag of Palestine
- World Aquatics code: PLE
- National federation: Palestinian Swimming Federation and Aquatic Sports

in Singapore
- Competitors: 3 in 1 sport
- Medals: Gold 0 Silver 0 Bronze 0 Total 0

World Aquatics Championships appearances
- 1973; 1975; 1978; 1982; 1986; 1991; 1994; 1998; 2001; 2003; 2005; 2007; 2009; 2011; 2013; 2015; 2017; 2019; 2022; 2023; 2024; 2025

Palestine is competing at the 2025 World Aquatics Championships in Singapore from 11 July to 3 August 2025.

== Competitors ==
The following is the list of competitors in the Championships.

| Sport | Men | Women | Total |
|---|---|---|---|
| Swimming | 1 | 2 | 3 |
| Total | 1 | 2 | 3 |

== Swimming ==
Men

| Athlete | Event | Heat | | Semifinal | | Final | |
| Athlete | Event | Time | Rank | Time | Rank | Time | Rank |
|---|---|---|---|---|---|---|---|
| Mahmoud Abu Gharbieh | 50 m freestyle | 24.55 | 80 | Did not advance | | | |
| Mahmoud Abu Gharbieh | 100 m freestyle | 54.02 | 80 | Did not advance | | | |

Women

| Athlete | Event | Heat | | Semifinal | | Final | |
| Athlete | Event | Time | Rank | Time | Rank | Time | Rank |
|---|---|---|---|---|---|---|---|
| Marina Abu Shamaleh | 50 m freestyle | 28.25 | 67 | Did not advance | | | |
| Marina Abu Shamaleh | 100 m breaststroke | 1:15.60 | 53 | Did not advance | | | |
| Valerie Tarazi | 50 m breaststroke | 33.39 | 42 | Did not advance | | | |
| Valerie Tarazi | 50 m butterfly | 28.72 | 54 | Did not advance | | | |
