= Italy at the 2015 World Aquatics Championships =

- Flag of Italy
- World Aquatics code: ITA
- National federation: Federazione Italiana Nuoto
- Website: www.federnuoto.it

in Kazan, Russia
- Competitors: 100 in 6 sports
- Medals Ranked 7th: Gold 3 Silver 3 Bronze 8 Total 14

World Aquatics Championships appearances (overview)
- 1973; 1975; 1978; 1982; 1986; 1991; 1994; 1998; 2001; 2003; 2005; 2007; 2009; 2011; 2013; 2015; 2017; 2019; 2022; 2023; 2024; 2025

Italy competed at the 2015 World Aquatics Championships in Kazan, Russia from 24 July to 9 August 2015. It won at least one medal in all disciplines except high diving.

== Medalists ==
Medal	Name	Sport	Event	Date
Gold	Tania Cagnotto	Diving	Women's 1 m springboard	July 28
Gold	Simone Ruffini	Open water swimming	Men's 25 km	August 1
Gold	Gregorio Paltrinieri	Swimming	Men's 1500 m freestyle	August 9
Silver	Federica Pellegrini	Swimming	Women's 200 m freestyle	August 5
Silver	Gregorio Paltrinieri	Swimming	Men's 800 m freestyle	August 5
Silver	Chiara Masini Luccetti; Alice Mizzau; Erica Musso; Federica Pellegrini	Swimming	Women's 4×200 m freestyle relay	August 6
Bronze	Matteo Furlan	Open water swimming	Men's 5 km	July 25
Bronze	Matteo Furlan	Open water swimming	Men's 25 km	August 1
Bronze	Giorgio Minisini; Manila Flamini	Synchronized swimming	Mixed duet technical routine	July 26
Bronze	Giorgio Minisini; Mariangela Perrupato	Synchronized swimming	Mixed duet free routine	July 30
Bronze	Tania Cagnotto	Diving	Women's 3 m springboard	August 1
Bronze	Maicol Verzotto; Tania Cagnotto	Diving	Mixed 3 m synchronized springboard	August 2
Bronze	Luca Dotto; Filippo Magnini; Marco Orsi; Michele Santucci	Swimming	Men's 4×100 m freestyle relay	August 2
Bronze	Italy women's national water polo team: Rosaria Aiello; Laura Barzon; Roberta Bianconi; Tania Di Mario; Giulia Enrica Emmolo; Teresa Frassinetti; Arianna Garibotti; Giulia Gorlero; Francesca Pomeri; Elisa Queirolo; Federica Radicchi; Chiara Tabani; Laura Teani	Water polo	Women's tournament	August 7

== Diving ==
Italian divers qualified for the individual spots and the synchronized teams at the World Championships.

Men

Athlete	Event	Preliminaries		Semifinals		Final	
Athlete	Event	Points	Rank	Points	Rank	Points	Rank
Andrea Chiarabini	1 m springboard	334.10	20	—N/a		Did not advance	
Giovanni Tocci	1 m springboard	353.00	16	—N/a		Did not advance	
Michele Benedetti	3 m springboard	364.00	35	Did not advance			
Tommaso Rinaldi	3 m springboard	382.10	30	Did not advance			
Francesco Dell'Uomo	10 m platform	388.35	26	Did not advance			
Maicol Verzotto	10 m platform	359.35	33	Did not advance			
Andrea Chiarabini; Giovanni Tocci	3 m synchronized springboard	412.17	5 Q	—N/a		402.00	9
Francesco Dell'Uomo; Maicol Verzotto	10 m synchronized platform	362.55	16	—N/a		Did not advance	

Women

Athlete	Event	Preliminaries		Semifinals		Final	
Athlete	Event	Points	Rank	Points	Rank	Points	Rank
Elena Bertocchi	1 m springboard	208.40	29	—N/a		Did not advance	
Tania Cagnotto	1 m springboard	291.25	2 Q	—N/a		310.85	1st place, gold medalist(s)
Tania Cagnotto	3 m springboard	307.45	7 Q	330.45	5 Q	356.15	3rd place, bronze medalist(s)
Francesca Dallapé	3 m springboard	312.50	6 Q	258.25	17	Did not advance	
Noemi Batki	10 m platform	314.40	14 Q	331.60	10 Q	255.00	12
Tania Cagnotto; Francesca Dallapé	3 m synchronised springboard	280.77	7 Q	—N/a		302.43	5

Mixed

Athlete	Event	Final	
Athlete	Event	Points	Rank
Maicol Verzotto; Tania Cagnotto	3 m synchronized springboard	315.30	3rd place, bronze medalist(s)
Maicol Verzotto; Noemi Batki	10 m synchronized platform	299.28	6
Michele Benedetti; Noemi Batki	Team	377.05	8

== High diving ==
Italy has qualified one high diver at the World Championships.

Athlete	Event	Points	Rank
Alessandro de Rose	Men's high diving	358.95	16

== Open water swimming ==
Italy has nominated eleven swimmers to compete in the open water marathon.

Men

Athlete	Event	Time	Rank
Matteo Furlan	5 km	55:20.0	3rd place, bronze medalist(s)
Matteo Furlan	25 km	4:54:38.0	3rd place, bronze medalist(s)
Simone Ruffini	10 km	1:50:09.1	7
Simone Ruffini	25 km	4:53:10.7	1st place, gold medalist(s)
Mario Sanzullo	5 km	55:22.7	8
Federico Vanelli	10 km	1:50:23.1	10

Women

Athlete	Event	Time	Rank
Arianna Bridi	5 km	59:12.9	9
Rachele Bruni	10 km	1:58:27.9	4
Alice Franco	25 km	5:19:50.5	7
Martina Grimaldi	5 km	59:16.0	11
Aurora Ponselè	10 km	1:59:33.9	22
Ilaria Raimondi	25 km	5:21:05.2	10

Mixed

Athlete	Event	Time	Rank
Rachele Bruni; Simone Ercoli; Federico Vanelli	Team	55:49.4	4

== Swimming ==
Italian swimmers have achieved qualifying standards in the following events (up to a maximum of 2 swimmers in each event at the A-standard entry time, and 1 at the B-standard): Swimmers must qualify at the 2015 Italian Spring Championships and Sette Colli Trophy (for pool events) to confirm their places for the Worlds.

Thirty-seven swimmers (19 men and 18 women) have been nominated to the Italian team at the Worlds, including 2008 Olympic champion and world record holder Federica Pellegrini and 2013 Worlds bronze medalist Gregorio Paltrinieri in the men's 1500 m freestyle.

Men

Athlete	Event	Heat		Semifinal		Final	
Athlete	Event	Time	Rank	Time	Rank	Time	Rank
Lorenzo Antonelli	100 m breaststroke	1:02.20	37	Did not advance			
Christopher Ciccarese	100 m backstroke	54.81	=26	Did not advance			
Christopher Ciccarese	200 m backstroke	1:58.79	18	Did not advance			
Piero Codia	50 m butterfly	23.81	18	Did not advance			
Piero Codia	100 m butterfly	51.94	12 Q	52.22	14	Did not advance	
Andrea Mitchell D'Arrigo	400 m freestyle	3:51.31	27	—N/a		Did not advance	
Luca Dotto	50 m freestyle	22.48	=17	Did not advance			
Luca Dotto	100 m freestyle	49.01	17	Did not advance			
Filippo Magnini	200 m freestyle	1:48.18	20	Did not advance			
Luca Mencarini	200 m backstroke	1:58.31	15 Q	1:57.81	11	Did not advance	
Marco Orsi	50 m freestyle	22.03	6 Q	21.86	3 Q	21.86	=5
Marco Orsi	100 m freestyle	48.82	13 Q	48.69	15	Did not advance	
Gregorio Paltrinieri	800 m freestyle	7:45.15	2 Q	—N/a		7:40.81 EU	2nd place, silver medalist(s)
Gregorio Paltrinieri	1500 m freestyle	14:51.04	1 Q	—N/a		14:39.67 EU	1st place, gold medalist(s)
Francesco Pavone	200 m butterfly	1:57.69	18	Did not advance			
Luca Pizzini	200 m breaststroke	2:11.00	15 Q	2:11.05	15	Did not advance	
Matteo Rivolta	100 m butterfly	51.88	9 'Q	51.64	10	Did not advance	
Simone Sabbioni	50 m backstroke	25.21	11 Q	25.05	12	Did not advance	
Simone Sabbioni	100 m backstroke	53.83	11 Q	53.60	10	Did not advance	
Andrea Toniato	50 m breaststroke	27.47	=13 Q	27.61	15	Did not advance	
Federico Turrini	200 m individual medley	2:00.94	19	Did not advance			
Federico Turrini	400 m individual medley	4:15.70	9	—N/a		Did not advance	
Luca Dotto; Marco Orsi; Michele Santucci; Filippo Magnini	4×100 m freestyle relay	3:14.44	3 Q	—N/a		3:12.53	3rd place, bronze medalist(s)
Gianluca Maglia; Marco Belotti; Damiano Lestingi; Filippo Magnini	4×200 m freestyle relay	7:13.77	13	—N/a		Did not advance	
Marco Orsi; Matteo Rivolta; Simone Sabbioni; Andrea Toniato	4×100 m medley relay	3:34.59	9	—N/a		Did not advance	

Women

Athlete	Event	Heat		Semifinal		Final	
Athlete	Event	Time	Rank	Time	Rank	Time	Rank
Ilaria Bianchi	100 m butterfly	58.37	14 Q	58.49	15	Did not advance	
Martina Caramignoli	800 m freestyle	8:38.56	16	—N/a		Did not advance	
Martina Caramignoli	1500 m freestyle	16:27.13	13	—N/a		Did not advance	
Diletta Carli	400 m freestyle	4:07.15	=6 Q	—N/a		4:07.30	7
Martine Carraro	50 m breaststroke	30.83	10 Q	31.17	=13	Did not advance	
Arianna Castiglioni	50 m breaststroke	30.90	=12 Q	31.17	=13	Did not advance	
Arianna Castiglioni	100 m breaststroke	1:07.52	=14 Q	1:06.95	7 Q	1:07.60	8
Elena di Liddo	100 m butterfly	59.78	32	Did not advance			
Silvia di Pietro	50 m freestyle	25.34	23	Did not advance			
Silvia di Pietro	50 m butterfly	26.32	11 Q	26.17	12	Did not advance	
Erika Ferraioli	50 m freestyle	25.44	=24	Did not advance			
Erika Ferraioli	100 m freestyle	55.12	22	Did not advance			
Elena Gemo	50 m backstroke	28.18	11 Q	28.21	11	Did not advance	
Elena Gemo	100 m backstroke	1:01.10	=23	Did not advance			
Elena Gemo	50 m butterfly	27.07	=7 Q	27.11	11	Did not advance	
Alice Mizzau	200 m freestyle	1:59.68	22	Did not advance			
Alice Mizzau	400 m freestyle	4:10.92	17	—N/a		Did not advance	
Erica Musso	800 m freestyle	8:38.56	16	—N/a		Did not advance	
Margherita Panziera	100 m backstroke	1:02.17	37	Did not advance			
Margherita Panziera	200 m backstroke	2:10.39	12 Q	2:09.54	10	Did not advance	
Federica Pellegrini	100 m freestyle	DNS		Did not advance			
Federica Pellegrini	200 m freestyle	1:57.34	6 Q	1:56.23	1 Q	1:55.32	2nd place, silver medalist(s)
Alessia Polieri	200 m butterfly	2:11.30	22	Did not advance			
Aurora Ponselè	1500 m freestyle	16:12.01	8 Q	—N/a		16:09.57	8
Ilaria Scarcella	100 m breaststroke	1:08.13	25	Did not advance			
Ilaria Scarcella	200 m breaststroke	2:26.40	20	Did not advance			
Erika Ferraioli; Silvia di Pietro; Laura Letrari; Federica Pellegrini	4×100 m freestyle relay	3:37.88	7 Q	—N/a		3:37.16	6
Alice Mizzau; Erica Musso; Chiara Masini Luccetti; Federica Pellegrini	4×200 m freestyle relay	7:52.51	1 Q	—N/a		7:48.41	2nd place, silver medalist(s)
Ilaria Bianchi; Arianna Castiglioni; Erika Ferraioli; Elena Gemo	4×100 m medley relay	4:00.92	9	—N/a		Did not advance	

Mixed

Athlete	Event	Heat		Final	
Athlete	Event	Time	Rank	Time	Rank
Marco Orsi; Filippo Magnini; Federica Pellegrini; Erika Ferraioli; Silvia di Pietro; Luca Dotto*	4×100 m freestyle relay	3:26.23	3 Q	3:25.26	5
Simone Sabbioni; Arianna Castiglioni; Piero Codia; Silvia di Pietro; Matteo Rivolta*; Erika Ferraioli*	4×100 m medley relay	3:46.03	5 Q	3:45.59	6

== Synchronized swimming ==
Italy fielded a full team of fourteen synchronized swimmers (one man and thirteen women) to compete in each of the following events.

Women

Athlete	Event	Preliminaries		Final	
Athlete	Event	Points	Rank	Points	Rank
Linda Cerruti	Solo technical routine	86.2072	7 Q	86.2559	7
Linda Cerruti	Solo free routine	88.5000	7 Q	89.2000	7
Linda Cerruti; Costanza Ferro	Duet technical routine	87.6477	7 Q	87.5775	7
Linda Cerruti; Costanza Ferro	Duet free routine	90.2000	6 Q	90.9667	6
Elisa Bozzo; Beatrice Callegari; Camilla Cattaneo; Francesca Deidda; Costanza Ferro; Manila Flamini; Mariangela Perrupato; Alessia Pezone*; Federica Sala*; Sara Sgarzi	Team technical routine	88.0673	7 Q	88.0516	7
Elisa Bozzo; Beatrice Callegari; Camilla Cattaneo; Francesca Deidda; Manila Flamini; Gemma Galli; Viola Musso*; Mariangela Perrupato; Alessia Pezone*; Sara Sgarzi	Team free routine	90.7667	6 Q	91.4667	6
Elisa Bozzo; Beatrice Callegari; Camilla Cattaneo; Linda Cerruti; Francesca Deidda; Costanza Ferro; Manila Flamini; Viola Musso; Mariangela Perrupato; Alessia Pezone*; Federica Sala*; Sara Sgarzi	Free routine combination	88.9000	7 Q	89.7333	7

Mixed

Athlete	Event	Preliminaries		Final	
Athlete	Event	Points	Rank	Points	Rank
Giorgio Minisini; Manila Flamini	Duet technical routine	85.4125	3 Q	86.3640	3rd place, bronze medalist(s)
Giorgio Minisini; Mariangela Perrupato	Duet free routine	87.9667	4 Q	89.3333	3rd place, bronze medalist(s)

== Water polo ==
=== Men's tournament ===
Team roster

- Stefano Tempesti
- Francesco Di Fulvio
- Alessandro Velotto
- Pietro Figlioli
- Alex Giorgetti
- Andrea Fondelli
- Massimo Giacoppo
- Nicholas Presciutti
- Niccolò Gitto
- Stefano Luongo
- Matteo Aicardi
- Fabio Baraldi
- Marco Del Lungo

Group play

Pos	Team	Pld	W	D	L	GF	GA	GD	Pts	Qualification
1	Greece	3	3	0	0	37	31	+6	6	Advanced to quarterfinals
2	United States	3	2	0	1	28	26	+2	4	Advanced to playoffs
3	Italy	3	1	0	2	28	28	0	2	Advanced to playoffs
4	Russia	3	0	0	3	23	31	−8	0	

Source: SportResult.com
Rules for classification: 1) points; 2) head-to-head points; 3) head-to-head goal difference; 4) head-to-head number of goals scored; 5) goal difference.

27 July 2015; 12:10	Report	Greece	11–10	Italy	Kazan; Attendance: 883; Referees: Francesc Buch (ESP), György Kun (HUN)
27 July 2015; 12:10	Report	Score by quarters: 4–4, 2–1, 3–2, 2–3			Kazan; Attendance: 883; Referees: Francesc Buch (ESP), György Kun (HUN)
27 July 2015; 12:10	Report	Afroudakis 3	Goals	four players 2	Kazan; Attendance: 883; Referees: Francesc Buch (ESP), György Kun (HUN)

29 July 2015; 18:50	Report	Russia	6–9	Italy	Kazan; Attendance: 2,350; Referees: Adrian Alexandrescu (ROU), Radosław Koryzna (POL)
29 July 2015; 18:50	Report	Score by quarters: 1–1, 0–5, 3–1, 2–2			Kazan; Attendance: 2,350; Referees: Adrian Alexandrescu (ROU), Radosław Koryzna (POL)
29 July 2015; 18:50	Report	Kholod 3	Goals	Giorgetti 2	Kazan; Attendance: 2,350; Referees: Adrian Alexandrescu (ROU), Radosław Koryzna (POL)

31 July 2015; 21:30	Report	United States	11–9	Italy	Kazan; Attendance: 214; Referees: Boris Margeta (SLO), Nenad Peris (CRO)
31 July 2015; 21:30	Report	Score by quarters: 4–4, 3–2, 2–1, 2–2			Kazan; Attendance: 214; Referees: Boris Margeta (SLO), Nenad Peris (CRO)
31 July 2015; 21:30	Report	Vavić 3	Goals	Di Fulvio 4	Kazan; Attendance: 214; Referees: Boris Margeta (SLO), Nenad Peris (CRO)

Playoffs

2 August 2015; 13:30	Report	Canada	2–8	Italy	Kazan; Attendance: 269; Referees: Mark Koganov (AZE), Francesc Buch (ESP)
2 August 2015; 13:30	Report	Score by quarters: 0–2, 1–1, 1–2, 0–3			Kazan; Attendance: 269; Referees: Mark Koganov (AZE), Francesc Buch (ESP)
2 August 2015; 13:30	Report	Kudaba, Torakis 1	Goals	Giorgetti, Gitto 2	Kazan; Attendance: 269; Referees: Mark Koganov (AZE), Francesc Buch (ESP)

Quarterfinals

4 August 2015; 20:10	Report	Hungary	7–8	Italy	Kazan; Attendance: 693; Referees: Adrian Alexandrescu (ROU), Georgios Stavridis (GRE)
4 August 2015; 20:10	Report	Score by quarters: 2–2, 2–1, 1–2, 2–3			Kazan; Attendance: 693; Referees: Adrian Alexandrescu (ROU), Georgios Stavridis (GRE)
4 August 2015; 20:10	Report	Dán. Varga 3	Goals	Di Fulvio, Luongo 2	Kazan; Attendance: 693; Referees: Adrian Alexandrescu (ROU), Georgios Stavridis (GRE)

Semifinals

6 August 2015; 22:00	Report	Italy	6–10	Serbia	Kazan; Attendance: 1,859; Referees: Boris Margeta (SLO), Radosław Koryzna (POL)
6 August 2015; 22:00	Report	Score by quarters: 0–4, 2–4, 2–1, 2–1			Kazan; Attendance: 1,859; Referees: Boris Margeta (SLO), Radosław Koryzna (POL)
6 August 2015; 22:00	Report	Fondelli 2	Goals	S. Mitrovic 3	Kazan; Attendance: 1,859; Referees: Boris Margeta (SLO), Radosław Koryzna (POL)

Third place game

8 August 2015; 20:30	Report	Greece	7–7 (PSO)	Italy	Kazan; Attendance: 2,165; Referees: Adrian Alexandrescu (ROU), Radosław Koryzna (POL)
8 August 2015; 20:30	Report	Score by quarters: 1–0, 2–2, 4–4, 0–1 PSO: 4–2			Kazan; Attendance: 2,165; Referees: Adrian Alexandrescu (ROU), Radosław Koryzna (POL)
8 August 2015; 20:30	Report	Vlahopoulos 3	Goals	Aicardi, Figlioli 2	Kazan; Attendance: 2,165; Referees: Adrian Alexandrescu (ROU), Radosław Koryzna (POL)

=== Women's tournament ===
Team roster

- Giulia Gorlero
- Chiara Tabani
- Arianna Garibotti
- Elisa Queirolo
- Federica Radicchi
- Rosaria Aiello
- Tania Di Mario
- Roberta Bianconi
- Giulia Emmolo
- Francesca Pomeri
- Laura Barzon
- Teresa Frassinetti
- Laura Teani

Group play

Pos	Team	Pld	W	D	L	GF	GA	GD	Pts	Qualification
1	Italy	3	3	0	0	40	18	+22	6	Advanced to quarterfinals
2	United States	3	2	0	1	39	14	+25	4	Advanced to playoffs
3	Brazil	3	1	0	2	19	36	−17	2	Advanced to playoffs
4	Japan	3	0	0	3	13	43	−30	0	

Source: SportResult.com
Rules for classification: 1) points; 2) head-to-head points; 3) head-to-head goal difference; 4) head-to-head number of goals scored; 5) goal difference.

26 July 2015; 20:10	Report	Japan	3–15	Italy	Kazan; Attendance: 2,286; Referees: Francesc Buch (ESP), Mark Koganov (AZE)
26 July 2015; 20:10	Report	Score by quarters: 0–5, 1–3, 2–2, 0–5			Kazan; Attendance: 2,286; Referees: Francesc Buch (ESP), Mark Koganov (AZE)
26 July 2015; 20:10	Report	three players 1	Goals	Garibotti, Tabani 3	Kazan; Attendance: 2,286; Referees: Francesc Buch (ESP), Mark Koganov (AZE)

28 July 2015; 12:10	Report	Italy	10–9	United States	Kazan; Attendance: 529; Referees: Georgios Stavridis (GRE), Cory Williams (NZL)
28 July 2015; 12:10	Report	Score by quarters: 4–2, 2–1, 2–4, 2–2			Kazan; Attendance: 529; Referees: Georgios Stavridis (GRE), Cory Williams (NZL)
28 July 2015; 12:10	Report	Bianconi 4	Goals	Fattal 5	Kazan; Attendance: 529; Referees: Georgios Stavridis (GRE), Cory Williams (NZL)

30 July 2015; 09:30	Report	Brazil	6–15	Italy	Kazan; Attendance: 617; Referees: Cory Williams (NZL), Viktor Salnichenko (KAZ)
30 July 2015; 09:30	Report	Score by quarters: 0–3, 1–5, 3–3, 2–4			Kazan; Attendance: 617; Referees: Cory Williams (NZL), Viktor Salnichenko (KAZ)
30 July 2015; 09:30	Report	Oliveira 4	Goals	Bianconi, Radicchi 3	Kazan; Attendance: 617; Referees: Cory Williams (NZL), Viktor Salnichenko (KAZ)

Quarterfinals

3 August 2015; 21:30	Report	Italy	9–6	Greece	Kazan; Referees: Mark Koganov (AZE), Radosław Koryzna (POL)
3 August 2015; 21:30	Report	Score by quarters: 1–0, 3–3, 3–2, 2–1			Kazan; Referees: Mark Koganov (AZE), Radosław Koryzna (POL)
3 August 2015; 21:30	Report	Di Mario 4	Goals	Charalampidi 3	Kazan; Referees: Mark Koganov (AZE), Radosław Koryzna (POL)

Semifinals

5 August 2015; 22:00	Report	Italy	5–5 (PSO)	Netherlands	Kazan; Attendance: 717; Referees: Sergey Naumov (RUS), Nenad Peris (CRO)
5 August 2015; 22:00	Report	Score by quarters: 0–2, 1–3, 1–0, 3–0 PSO: 4–5			Kazan; Attendance: 717; Referees: Sergey Naumov (RUS), Nenad Peris (CRO)
5 August 2015; 22:00	Report	Radicchi 2	Goals	Megens 4	Kazan; Attendance: 717; Referees: Sergey Naumov (RUS), Nenad Peris (CRO)

Third place game

7 August 2015; 20:30	Report	Australia	7–7 (PSO)	Italy	Kazan; Attendance: 1,508; Referees: Francesc Buch (ESP), Vojin Putniković (SRB)
7 August 2015; 20:30	Report	Score by quarters: 2–3, 1–2, 2–0, 2–2 PSO: 3–5			Kazan; Attendance: 1,508; Referees: Francesc Buch (ESP), Vojin Putniković (SRB)
7 August 2015; 20:30	Report	Southern, Webster 2	Goals	Di Mario 3	Kazan; Attendance: 1,508; Referees: Francesc Buch (ESP), Vojin Putniković (SRB)
