= Swimming at the 2015 World Aquatics Championships – Women's 4 × 200 metre freestyle relay =

Women's 4 × 200 metre freestyle relay at the 2015 World Aquatics Championships
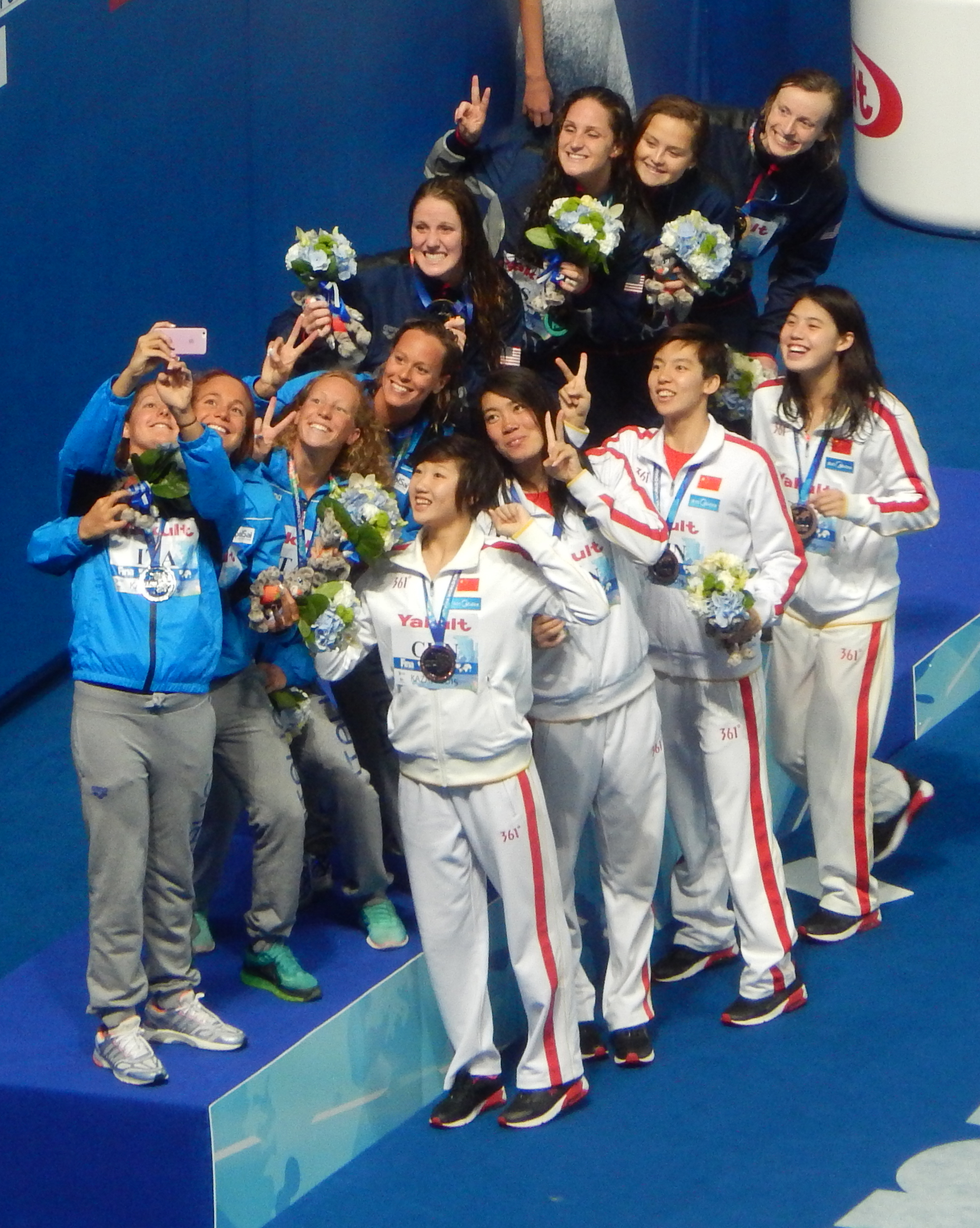
- Victory Ceremony
- Dates: 6 August (heats and final)
- Competitors: 80 from 18 nations
- Winning time: 7:45.37

Medalists
gold medal	Missy Franklin; Leah Smith; Katie McLaughlin; Katie Ledecky; Cierra Runge; Chelsea Chenault; Shannon Vreeland	United States
silver medal	Alice Mizzau; Erica Musso; Chiara Masini Luccetti; Federica Pellegrini	Italy
bronze medal	Qiu Yuhan; Guo Junjun; Zhang Yufei; Shen Duo; Shao Yiwen; Zhang Yuhan	China

The Women's 4 × 200 metre freestyle relay competition of the swimming events at the 2015 World Aquatics Championships in Kazan, Russia, was held on 6 August with the heats and the final.

== Records ==
Prior to the competition, the existing world and championship records were as follows.

World record	China	7:42.08	Rome, Italy	30 July 2009
Competition record	China	7:42.08	Rome, Italy	30 July 2009

== Results ==
=== Heats ===
The heats were held at 10:57.

Rank	Heat	Lane	Nation	Swimmers	Time	Notes
1	2	3	Italy	Alice Mizzau (1:58.78); Erica Musso (1:58.05); Chiara Masini Luccetti (1:59.08); Federica Pellegrini (1:56.60)	7:52.51	Q
2	1	5	United States	Leah Smith (1:57.52); Cierra Runge (1:58.65); Chelsea Chenault (1:58.04); Shannon Vreeland (1:58.40)	7:52.61	Q
3	2	5	Australia	Bronte Barratt (1:57.67); Jessica Ashwood (1:58.98); Leah Neale (1:57.69); Emma McKeon (1:58.32)	7:52.66	Q
4	2	8	Sweden	Louise Hansson (1:58.45); Michelle Coleman (1:58.18); Stina Gardell (2:01.25); Sarah Sjöström (1:55.69)	7:53.57	Q
5	2	2	China	Qiu Yuhan (1:56.93); Shao Yiwen (1:59.44); Zhang Yuhan (1:59.67); Guo Junjun (1:58.27)	7:54.31	Q
6	2	4	Japan	Chihiro Igarashi (1:58.52); Rikako Ikee (1:58.86); Sachi Mochida (1:58.36); Tomomi Aoki (1:58.84)	7:54.58	Q
7	2	9	Great Britain	Siobhan-Marie O'Connor (1:58.58); Rebecca Turner (1:58.47); Ellie Faulkner (1:59.21); Hannah Miley (1:58.73)	7:54.99	Q
8	2	7	France	Charlotte Bonnet (1:57.33); Coralie Balmy (1:57.36); Margaux Fabre (1:59.93); Ophélie-Cyrielle Étienne (2:00.46)	7:55.08	Q
9	1	6	Russia	Viktoriya Andreyeva (1:58.84); Veronika Popova (1:57.75); Arina Openysheva (1:59.11); Daria Mullakaeva (1:59.49)	7:55.19	
10	1	0	Brazil	Manuella Lyrio (1:58.72); Jéssica Cavalheiro (1:59.64); Joanna Maranhão (1:59.57); Larissa Oliveira (1:59.22)	7:57.15	
11	1	1	Canada	Katerine Savard (1:59.63); Alyson Ackman (1:59.43); Emily Overholt (1:58.62); Kennedy Goss (1:59.63)	7:57.31	
12	1	4	Germany	Alexandra Wenk (2:01.21); Annika Bruhn (1:59.67); Marlene Huther (2:00.99); Johanna Friedrich (1:59.61)	8:01.48	
13	1	7	Austria	Lisa Zaiser (2:00.69); Claudia Hufnagl (2:00.82); Jördis Steinegger (2:00.58); Lena Kreundl (2:03.14)	8:05.23	
14	2	6	Hong Kong	Camille Cheng (2:00.79); Stephanie Au (2:03.30); Sze Hang Yu (2:01.65); Siobhán Haughey (2:00.77)	8:06.51	
15	2	0	Switzerland	Danielle Villars (2:02.69); Noemi Girardet (2:00.77); Martina van Berkel (2:03.26); Maria Ugolkova (2:01.87)	8:08.59	NR
16	1	3	Colombia	Jessica Camposano (2:04.24); Isabella Arcila (2:06.47); Carolina Colorado Henao (2:04.56); María Álvarez (2:03.77)	8:19.04	NR
17	1	2	Turkey	Gizem Bozkurt (2:03.04); Ekaterina Avramova (2:07.25); Halime Zülal Zeren (2:07.55); Merve Eroglu (2:06.55)	8.24.39	
18	2	1	Singapore	Quah Ting Wen (2:03.17); Amanda Lim (2:06.73); Marina Chan (2:09.02); Rachel Tseng (2:05.68)	8:24.60	
	1	8	Hungary			DNS

=== Final ===
The final was held at 19:16.

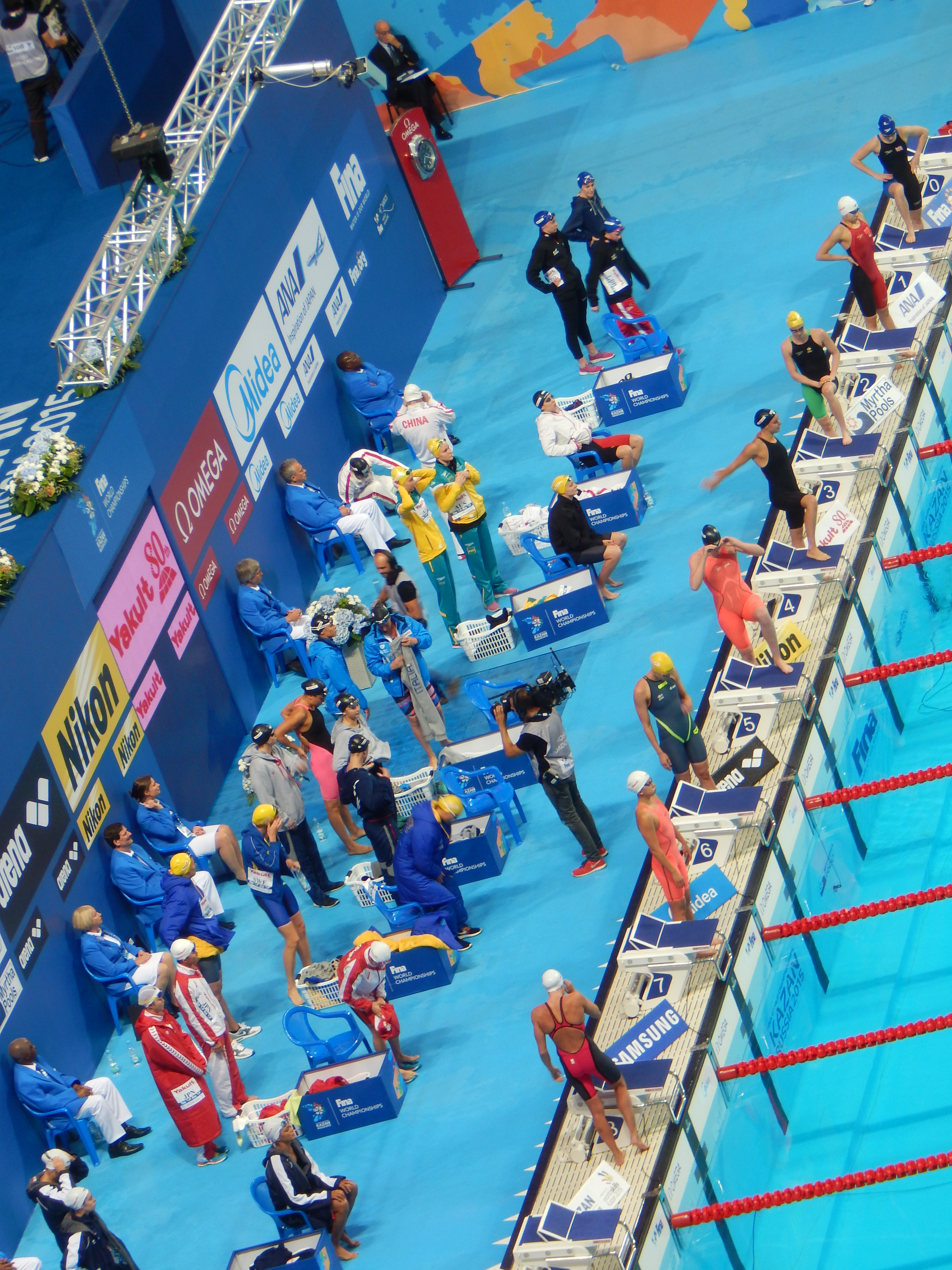
Before the final

Rank	Lane	Nation	Swimmers	Time	Notes
1st place, gold medalist(s)	5	United States	Missy Franklin (1:55.95); Leah Smith (1:56.86); Katie McLaughlin (1:56.92); Katie Ledecky (1:55.64)	7:45.37	
2nd place, silver medalist(s)	4	Italy	Alice Mizzau (1:57.50); Erica Musso (1:58.66); Chiara Masini Luccetti (1:57.52); Federica Pellegrini (1:54.73)	7:48.41	
3rd place, bronze medalist(s)	2	China	Qiu Yuhan (1:56.88); Guo Junjun (1:57.55); Zhang Yufei (1:58.73); Shen Duo (1:55.94)	7:49.10	
4	6	Sweden	Sarah Sjöström (1:54.31) NR; Louise Hansson (1:57.72); Michelle Coleman (1:57.36); Ida Marko-Varga (2:00.85)	7:50.24	NR
5	1	Great Britain	Siobhan-Marie O'Connor (1:57.78); Jazmin Carlin (1:56.35); Rebecca Turner (1:58.28); Hannah Miley (1:58.19)	7:50.60	
6	3	Australia	Bronte Barratt (1:58.14); Jessica Ashwood (1:58.32); Leah Neale (1:58.29); Emma McKeon (1:56.27)	7:51.02	
7	7	Japan	Chihiro Igarashi (1:58.20); Rikako Ikee (1:57.70); Sachi Mochida (1:59.16); Tomomi Aoki (1:59.56)	7:54.62	
8	8	France	Charlotte Bonnet (1:58.15); Coralie Balmy (1:57.59); Cloé Hache (1:59.76); Margaux Fabre (2:00.48)	7.55.98	
