= Swimming at the 2015 World Aquatics Championships – Women's 800 metre freestyle =

Women's 800 metre freestyle at the 2015 World Aquatics Championships
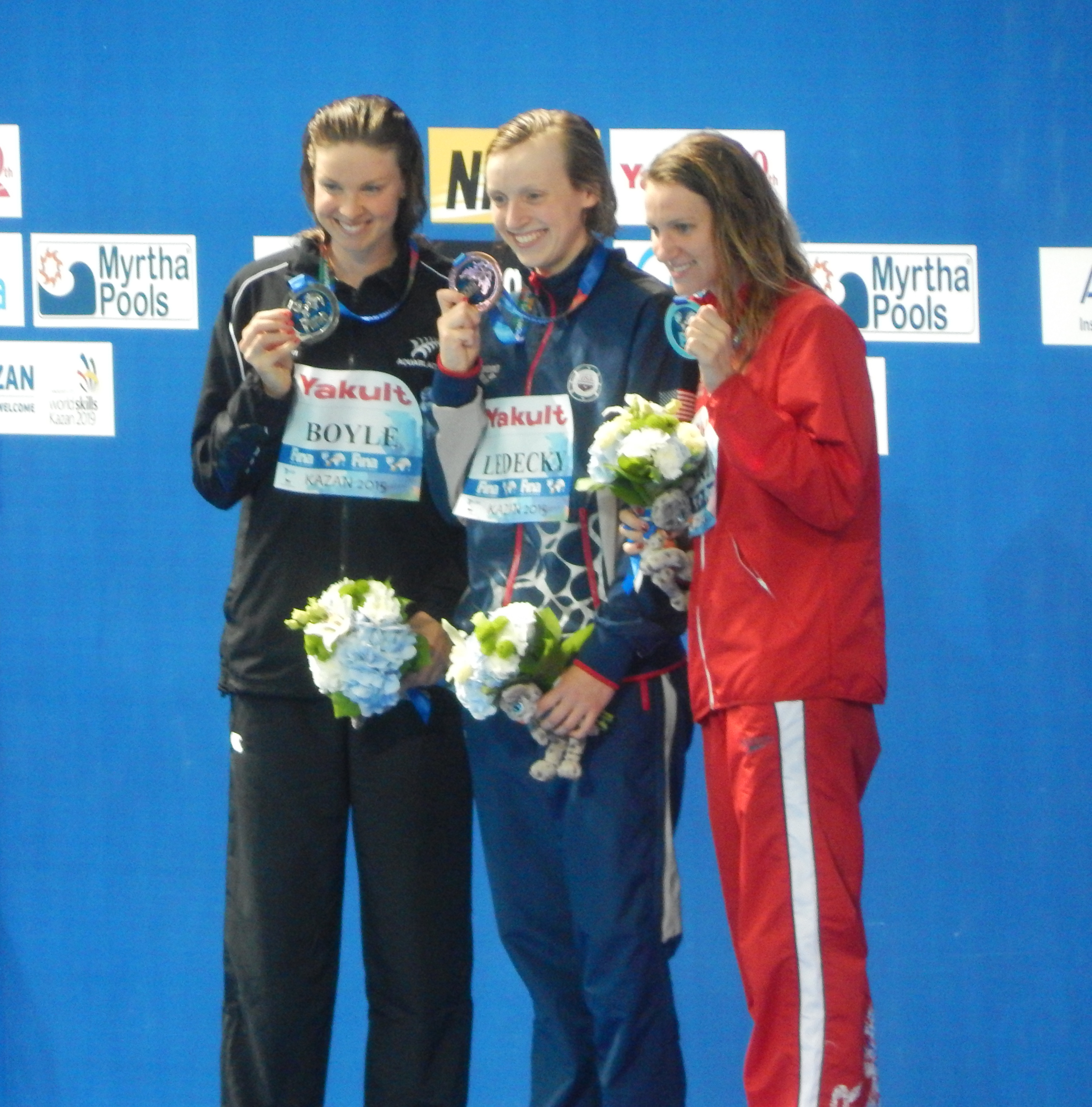
- Victory Ceremony
- Dates: 7 August (heats); 8 August (final)
- Competitors: 43 from 35 nations
- Winning time: 8:07.39 WR

Medalists
gold medal	Katie Ledecky	United States
silver medal	Lauren Boyle	New Zealand
bronze medal	Jazmin Carlin	Great Britain

The Women's 800 metre freestyle competition of the swimming events at the 2015 World Aquatics Championships was held on 7 August with the heats and 8 August with the final.

== Records ==
Prior to the championships, the existing world and championship records were as follows.

World record	Katie Ledecky (USA)	8:11.00	Shenandoah, United States	22 June 2014
Competition record	Katie Ledecky (USA)	8:13.86	Barcelona, Spain	3 August 2013

The following records were established during the competition:

Date	Event	Name	Nationality	Time	Record
4 August	Final*	Katie Ledecky	United States	8:13.25	CR
8 August	Final	Katie Ledecky	United States	8:07.39	WR

* Split from the women's 1500 metre freestyle

== Results ==
=== Heats ===
The heats were held at 11:17

Rank	Heat	Lane	Name	Nationality	Time	Notes
1	5	4	Katie Ledecky	United States	8:19.42	Q
2	4	5	Jessica Ashwood	Australia	8:22.17	Q
3	5	6	Lotte Friis	Denmark	8:23.12	Q
4	5	5	Lauren Boyle	New Zealand	8:23.66	Q
5	4	4	Jazmin Carlin	Great Britain	8:23.83	Q
6	4	6	Sharon van Rouwendaal	Netherlands	8:24.83	Q, NR
7	4	2	Sarah Köhler	Germany	8:26.16	Q
8	5	3	Boglárka Kapás	Hungary	8:26.96	Q
9	5	2	Leonie Beck	Germany	8:28.39	
10	4	3	Becca Mann	United States	8:28.44	
11	3	2	Kristel Köbrich	Chile	8:33.12	
12	5	8	Andreina Pinto	Venezuela	8:33.33	
13	4	7	Melani Costa	Spain	8:34.89	
14	5	9	Zhang Yuhan	China	8:35.17	
15	4	1	Jessica Thielmann	Great Britain	8:36.88	
16	5	7	Martina Caramignoli	Italy	8:38.56	
17	4	8	Tjasa Oder	Slovenia	8:38.85	
18	3	7	Julia Hassler	Liechtenstein	8:39.12	
19	5	1	Erica Musso	Italy	8:39.55	
20	2	5	Valerie Gruest	Guatemala	8:39.88	
21	3	3	Samantha Arévalo	Ecuador	8:41.15	
22	4	0	Beatriz Gómez Cortés	Spain	8:41.72	
23	2	3	María Álvarez	Colombia	8:42.14	NR
24	3	0	Montserrat Ortuño	Mexico	8:42.83	
25	3	4	Cao Yue	China	8:43.24	
26	3	5	Leah Neale	Australia	8:44.38	
27	4	9	Emma Robinson	New Zealand	8:44.86	
28	3	9	Monique Olivier	Luxembourg	8:45.37	
29	3	6	Joanna Evans	Bahamas	8:49.96	
30	2	4	Martina Elhenická	Czech Republic	8:53.08	
31	2	6	Khoo Cai Lin	Malaysia	8:55.20	
32	3	1	Jo Hyun-ju	South Korea	8:57.66	
33	2	1	Daniela Miyahara	Peru	9:00.30	
34	2	2	Rachel Tseng	Singapore	9:01.19	
35	2	7	Daniella van den Berg	Aruba	9:03.71	
36	2	9	Helena Moreno	Costa Rica	9:09.27	
37	3	8	Valeriya Salamatina	Russia	9:11.78	
38	2	8	Hannah Gill	Barbados	9:16.23	
39	2	0	Talita Te Flan	Ivory Coast	9:16.89	
40	1	4	Gabriella Doueihy	Lebanon	9:18.30	
41	1	5	Lena Rannvaardottir	Faroe Islands	9:35.53	
42	1	3	Makaela Holowchak	Antigua and Barbuda	9:37.68	
43	1	6	Victoria Chentsova	Northern Mariana Islands	9:48.87	
	5	0	Coralie Balmy	France		DNS

=== Final ===
The final was held on 8 August at 18:55.

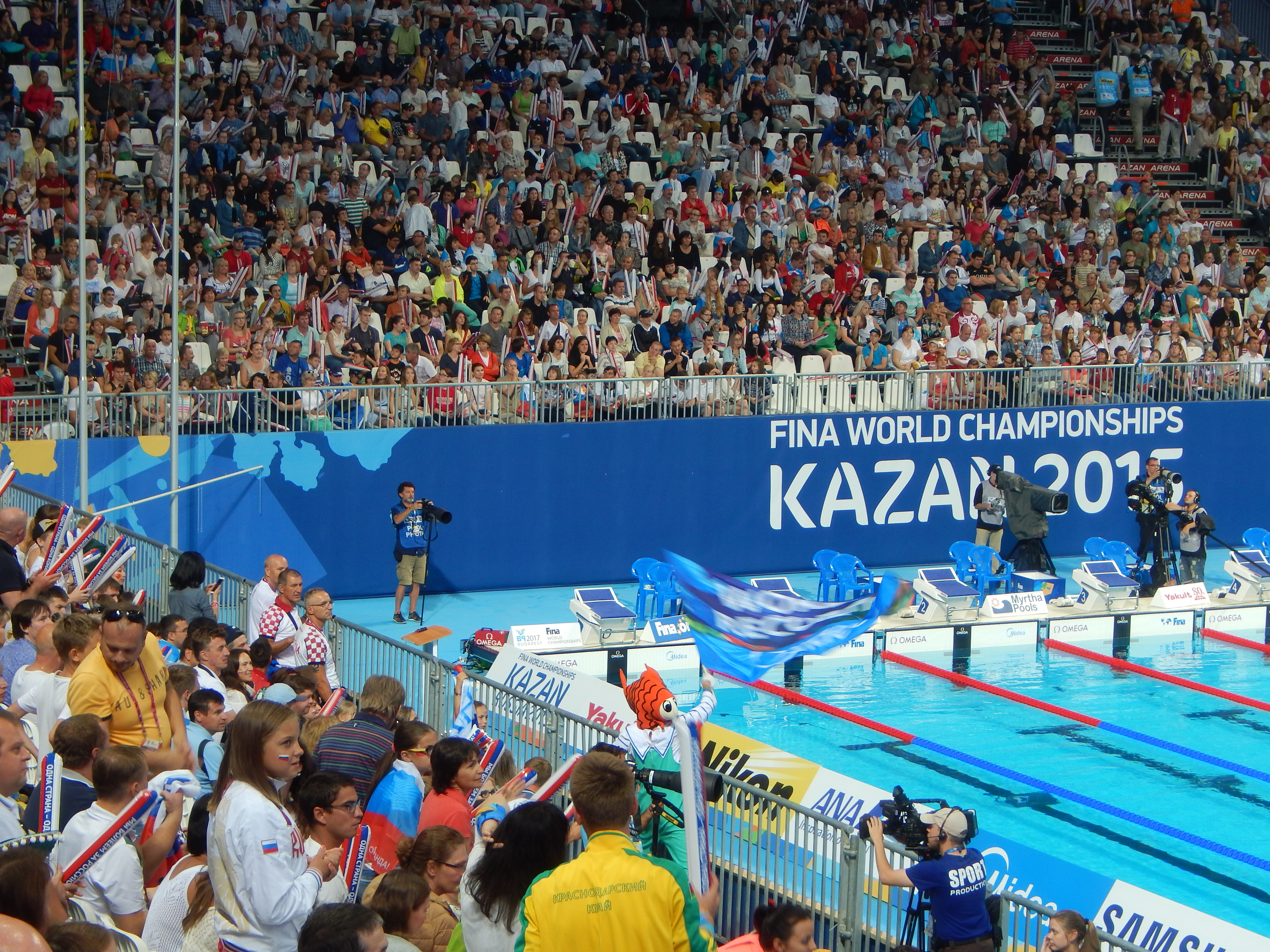
Kazan Arena after finish the final

Rank	Lane	Name	Nationality	Time	Notes
1st place, gold medalist(s)	4	Katie Ledecky	United States	8:07.39	WR
2nd place, silver medalist(s)	6	Lauren Boyle	New Zealand	8:17.65	OC
3rd place, bronze medalist(s)	2	Jazmin Carlin	Great Britain	8:18.15	
4	5	Jessica Ashwood	Australia	8:18.41	NR
5	3	Lotte Friis	Denmark	8:21.36	
6	8	Boglárka Kapás	Hungary	8:22.93	
7	1	Sarah Köhler	Germany	8:23.67	
8	7	Sharon van Rouwendaal	Netherlands	8:24.12	NR
