= Swimming at the 2015 World Aquatics Championships – Men's 200 metre freestyle =

Men's 200 metre freestyle at the 2015 World Aquatics Championships
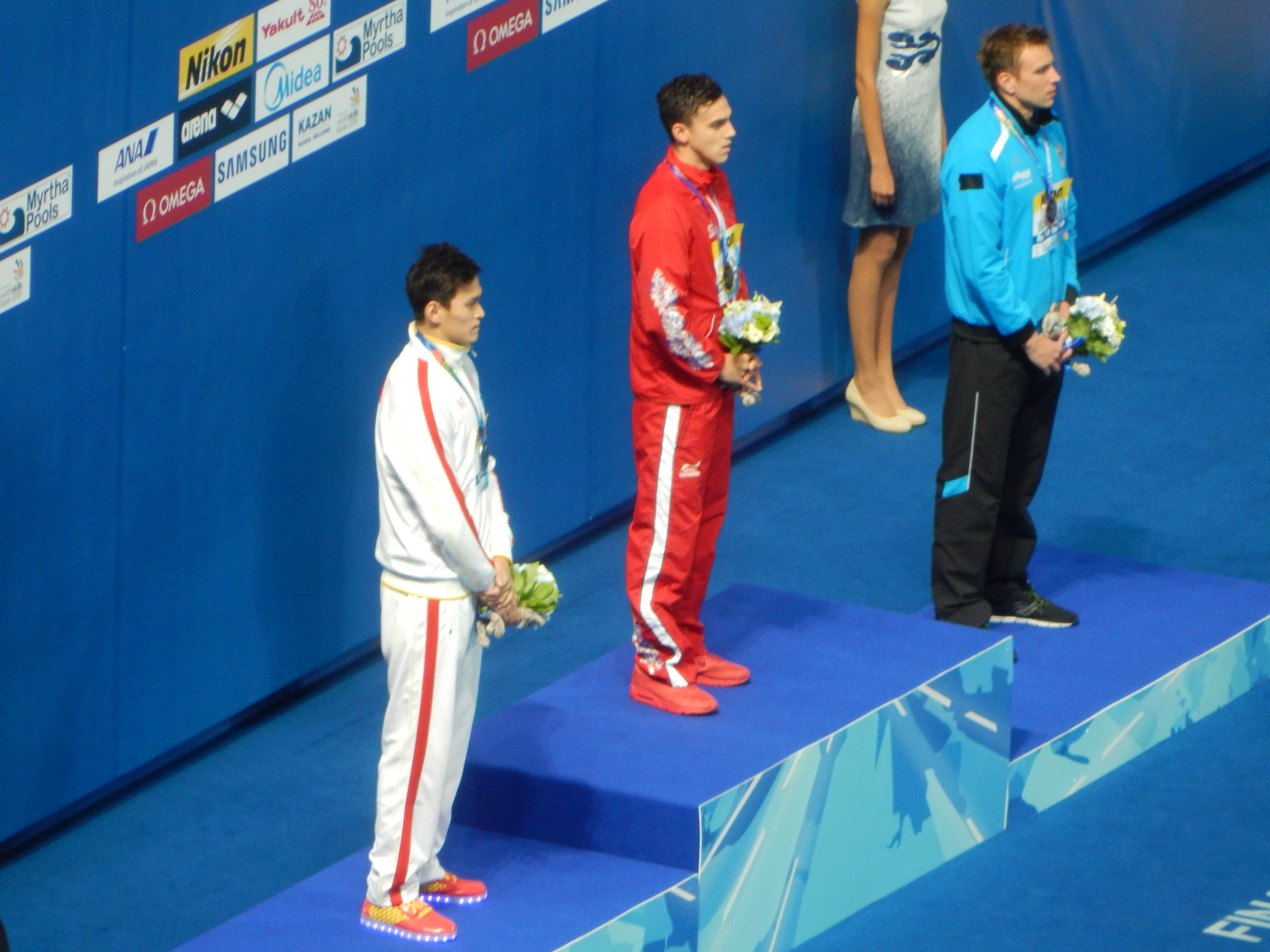
- Victory Ceremony
- Dates: 3 August (heats and semifinals); 4 August (final)
- Competitors: 80 from 69 nations
- Winning time: 1:45.14

Medalists
gold medal	James Guy	Great Britain
silver medal	Sun Yang	China
bronze medal	Paul Biedermann	Germany

The men's 200 metre freestyle competition of the swimming events at the 2015 World Aquatics Championships was held on 4 August with the heats and the semifinals on the 3 August.

British swimmer James Guy won the gold medal in a new National Record time of 1:45.14, holding off a strong charge from Asian Record holder Sun Yang (1:45.20). By winning, Guy continued his country's outstanding success in Kazan, and improved on his second place finish in the 400 meter freestyle. Meanwhile, World Record holder Paul Biedermann picked up the bronze medal in 1:45.38. After leading throughout the beginning of the race, American Ryan Lochte ended the 200m with a fourth-place finish (1:45.83). Dutchman Sebastiaan Verschuren picked up fifth (1:45.91), while South Africa's Chad le Clos added the middle distance freestyle event to his already large repertoire, finishing sixth in 1:46.53. Russia's Aleksandr Krasnykh (1:46.88) and Australian Cameron McEvoy (1:47.26) rounded out the championship field.

== Records ==
Prior to the competition, the existing world and championship records were as follows.

World record	Paul Biedermann (GER)	1:42.00	Rome, Italy	28 July 2009
Competition record	Paul Biedermann (GER)	1:42.00	Rome, Italy	28 July 2009

== Results ==
=== Heats ===
The heats were held on 3 August at 10:27.

Rank	Heat	Lane	Name	Nationality	Time	Notes
1	8	4	Sun Yang	China	1:46.00	Q
2	6	5	James Guy	Great Britain	1:46.10	Q
3	6	4	Paul Biedermann	Germany	1:46.20	Q
4	7	4	Cameron McEvoy	Australia	1:46.39	Q
5	8	6	Calum Jarvis	Great Britain	1:46.61	Q
6	6	1	Danila Izotov	Russia	1:46.65	Q
7	6	3	Conor Dwyer	United States	1:46.73	Q
8	7	5	Sebastiaan Verschuren	Netherlands	1:46.88	Q
9	7	2	Aleksandr Krasnykh	Russia	1:46.91	Q
10	8	3	David McKeon	Australia	1:47.00	Q
11	8	5	Velimir Stjepanović	Serbia	1:47.10	Q
12	7	9	Chad le Clos	South Africa	1:47.17	Q
13	7	6	Ryan Lochte	United States	1:47.18	Q
14	7	3	João de Lucca	Brazil	1:47.47	Q
15	8	7	Myles Brown	South Africa	1:47.48	Q
16	7	0	Federico Grabich	Argentina	1:47.73	Q
17	8	0	Marwan El-Kamash	Egypt	1:47.87	
18	8	1	Yuki Kobori	Japan	1:48.09	
19	5	6	Kacper Majchrzak	Poland	1:48.12	
20	6	2	Filippo Magnini	Italy	1:48.18	
21	5	3	Clemens Rapp	Germany	1:48.20	
22	7	7	Nicolas Oliveira	Brazil	1:48.23	
23	5	1	Anders Lie	Denmark	1:48.27	
24	6	7	Jeremy Bagshaw	Canada	1:48.29	
25	6	6	Pieter Timmers	Belgium	1:48.43	
26	5	5	Alexandre Haldemann	Switzerland	1:48.49	
27	8	9	Cristian Quintero	Venezuela	1:48.55	
28	8	2	Matthew Stanley	New Zealand	1:48.67	
29	8	8	Felix Auböck	Austria	1:48.75	
30	6	9	Grégory Mallet	France	1:48.77	
31	5	4	Kyle Stolk	Netherlands	1:48.96	
32	5	2	Miguel Durán	Spain	1:49.05	
33	4	1	Henrik Christiansen	Norway	1:49.09	
34	6	8	Péter Bernek	Hungary	1:49.25	
35	6	0	Xu Qiheng	China	1:49.32	
36	5	9	Liran Konovalov	Israel	1:49.56	
37	5	8	Ben Hockin	Paraguay	1:49.60	
38	4	3	Illia Teslenko	Ukraine	1:49.87	
39	4	6	Povilas Strazdas	Lithuania	1:49.91	
40	7	1	Tsubasa Amai	Japan	1:50.04	
41	3	2	Alexei Sancov	Moldova	1:50.18	
42	4	2	Doğa Çelik	Turkey	1:50.38	
43	4	7	Ahmed Mathlouthi	Tunisia	1:50.61	
44	4	9	Marcelo Acosta	El Salvador	1:50.77	
45	3	1	Pavel Janeček	Czech Republic	1:50.95	
46	3	9	Khurshidjon Tursunov	Uzbekistan	1:50.98	
47	7	8	Matias Koski	Finland	1:51.00	
48	4	5	Christos Katrantzis	Greece	1:51.01	
49	4	4	Yeo Kai Quan	Singapore	1:51.29	
50	3	6	Mateo de Angulo	Colombia	1:51.49	
51	4	8	Sim Wee Sheng Welson Sim	Malaysia	1:51.65	
52	2	3	Khader Baqlah	Jordan	1:51.67	
53	3	4	Tomas Peribonio	Ecuador	1:51.78	
54	4	0	Jessie Lacuna	Philippines	1:51.85	
55	3	7	Ensar Hajder	Bosnia and Herzegovina	1:51.96	
56	2	4	Aaron D'Souza	India	1:52.00	
57	2	6	Sean Gunn	Zimbabwe	1:52.05	
58	3	0	Pit Brandenburger	Luxembourg	1:52.12	
59	3	3	Huang Yen-hsin	Chinese Taipei	1:52.43	
60	2	2	Mario Montoya	Costa Rica	1:52.92	
61	2	7	Irakli Revishvili	Georgia	1:53.68	
62	3	8	Yousef Al-Askari	Kuwait	1:53.97	
63	5	0	Hoàng Quý Phước	Vietnam	1:54.31	
64	3	5	Viktar Krasochka	Belarus	1:54.36	
65	2	0	Igor Mogne	Mozambique	1:55.59	
66	2	5	Lorenzo Loria	Mexico	1:56.36	
67	2	8	Iacovos Hadjiconstantinou	Cyprus	1:57.38	
68	2	1	Christian Selby	Barbados	1:57.74	
69	1	4	Brandon Schuster	Samoa	1:57.93	
70	1	3	Klavio Meca	Albania	1:58.32	
71	1	1	Sovijja Pou	Cambodia	1:58.41	
72	1	5	Ahmed Gebrel	Palestine	1:58.54	
73	2	9	Bakr Al-Dulaimi	Iraq	1:58.55	
74	1	7	Ismael Kane	Senegal	2:00.66	
75	1	6	Alexander Skinner	Namibia	2:01.01	
76	1	8	Andre van der Merwe	Botswana	2:01.77	
77	1	2	Yacop Al-Khulaifi	Qatar	2:04.38	
78	1	0	Theo Chiabaut	Monaco	2:04.59	
79	1	9	Eloi Imaniraguha	Rwanda	2:20.68	
	5	7	Clément Mignon	France	DSQ	

=== Semifinals ===
The semifinals were held on 3 August at 18.42.

==== Semifinal 1 ====
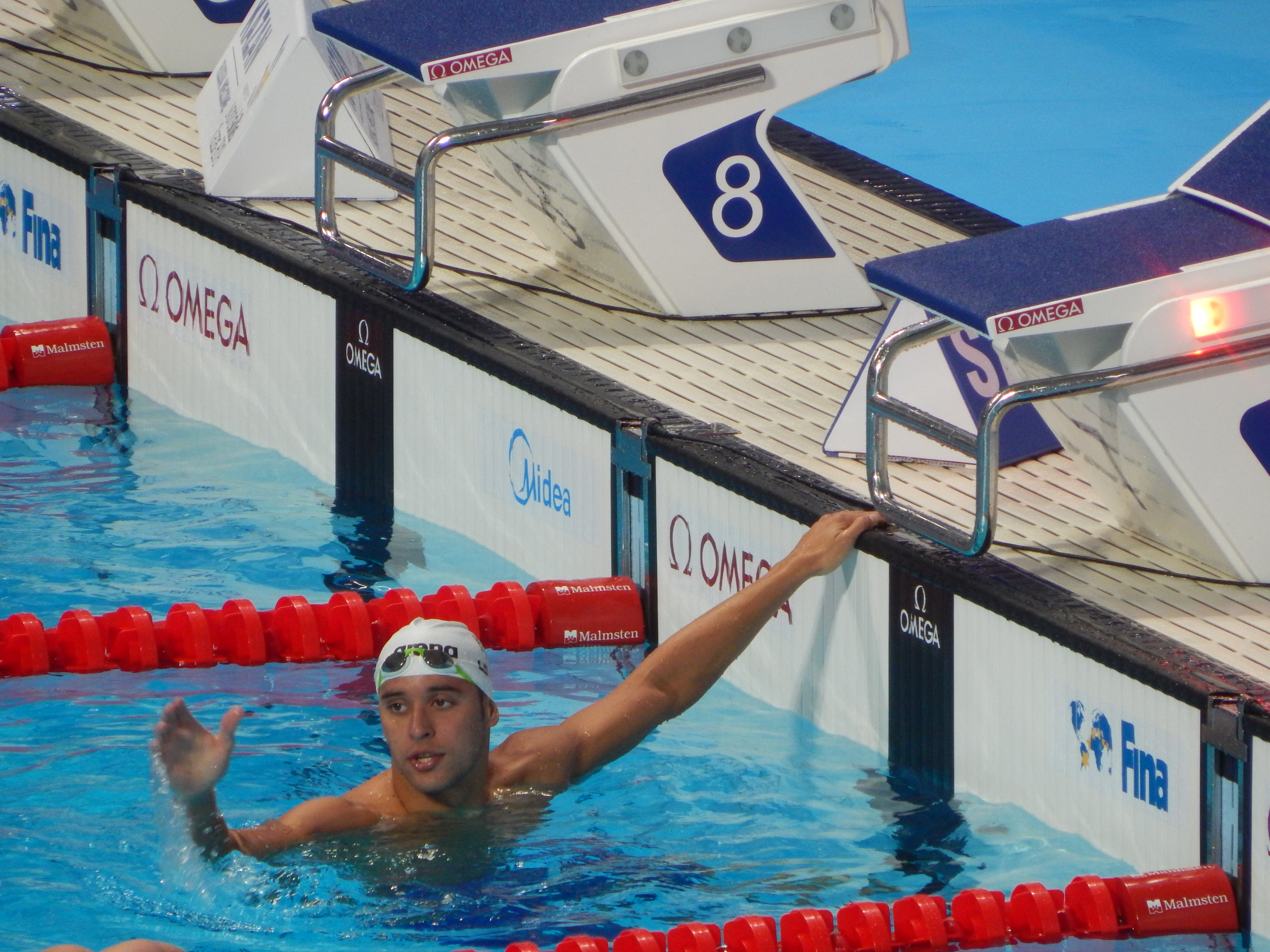
le Clos finished third in the first semi

Rank	Lane	Name	Nationality	Time	Notes
1	4	James Guy	Great Britain	1:45.43	Q, NR
2	5	Cameron McEvoy	Australia	1:46.09	Q
3	7	Chad le Clos	South Africa	1:46.10	Q
4	6	Sebastiaan Verschuren	Netherlands	1:46.43	Q
5	8	Federico Grabich	Argentina	1:47.43	NR
6	2	David McKeon	Australia	1:47.60	
7	3	Danila Izotov	Russia	1:47.66	
8	1	João de Lucca	Brazil	1:48.23	

==== Semifinal 2 ====
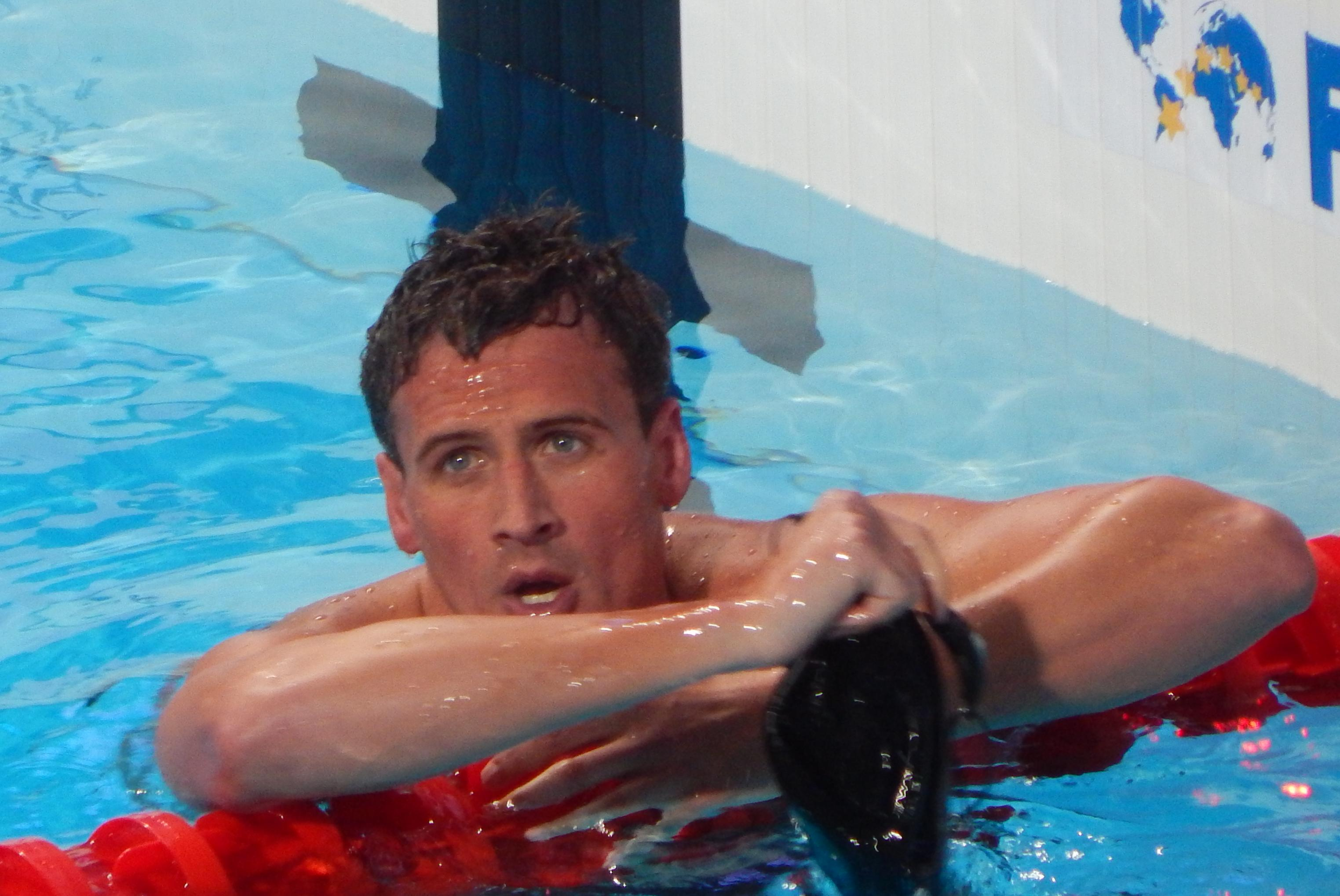
Ryan Lochte wins the second semi

Rank	Lane	Name	Nationality	Time	Notes
1	1	Ryan Lochte	United States	1:45.36	Q
2	4	Sun Yang	China	1:46.17	Q
3	5	Paul Biedermann	Germany	1:46.20	Q
4	2	Aleksandr Krasnykh	Russia	1:46.45	Q
5	6	Conor Dwyer	United States	1:46.64	
6	7	Velimir Stjepanović	Serbia	1:46.85	
7	8	Myles Brown	South Africa	1:47.55	
8	3	Calum Jarvis	Great Britain	1:47.64	

=== Final ===
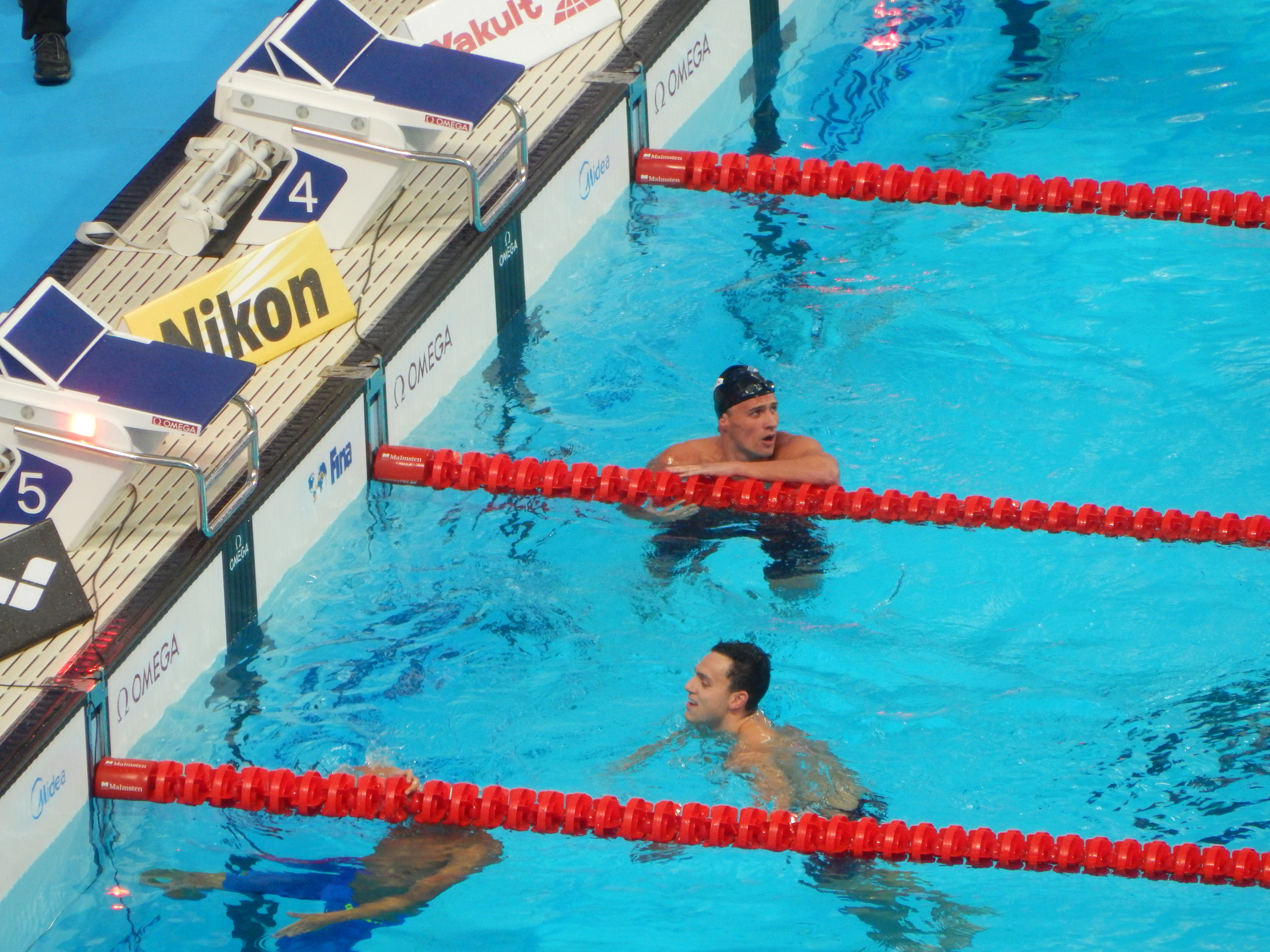
Guy and Lochte after finish

The final was held on 4 August at 17:32.

Rank	Lane	Name	Nationality	Time	Notes
1st place, gold medalist(s)	5	James Guy	Great Britain	1:45.14	NR
2nd place, silver medalist(s)	2	Sun Yang	China	1:45.20	
3rd place, bronze medalist(s)	7	Paul Biedermann	Germany	1:45.38	
4	4	Ryan Lochte	United States	1:45.83	
5	1	Sebastiaan Verschuren	Netherlands	1:45.91	
6	6	Chad le Clos	South Africa	1:46.53	
7	8	Aleksandr Krasnykh	Russia	1:46.88	
8	3	Cameron McEvoy	Australia	1:47.26	
