= Palestine at the 2013 World Aquatics Championships =

- Flag of Palestine
- FINA code: PLE
- National federation: Palestine Swimming Federation

in Barcelona, Spain
- Competitors: 4 in 2 sports
- Medals: Gold 0 Silver 0 Bronze 0 Total 0

World Aquatics Championships appearances
- 1973; 1975; 1978; 1982; 1986; 1991; 1994; 1998; 2001; 2003; 2005; 2007; 2009; 2011; 2013; 2015; 2017; 2019; 2022; 2023; 2024

State of Palestine is competing at the 2013 World Aquatics Championships in Barcelona, Spain between 19 July and 4 August 2013.

== Open water swimming ==
Palestine qualified a single quota in open water swimming.

Athlete	Event	Time	Rank
Ahmed Gebrel	Men's 5 km	57:04.0	39

== Swimming ==
Palestinian swimmers achieved qualifying standards in the following events (up to a maximum of 2 swimmers in each event at the A-standard entry time, and 1 at the B-standard):

Men

Athlete	Event	Heat		Semifinal		Final	
Athlete	Event	Time	Rank	Time	Rank	Time	Rank
Mohammad Abdo	50 m freestyle	25.85	76	did not advance			
Ahmed Gebrel	200 m freestyle	1:57.68	57	did not advance			
Ahmed Gebrel	400 m freestyle	4:07.70	42	—		did not advance	

Women

Athlete	Event	Heat		Semifinal		Final	
Athlete	Event	Time	Rank	Time	Rank	Time	Rank
Sabine Hazboun	50 m freestyle	28.29	55	did not advance			
Sabine Hazboun	100 m freestyle	1:02.86	61	did not advance			
