= Swimming at the 2015 World Aquatics Championships – Men's 400 metre freestyle =

Men's 400 metre freestyle at the 2015 World Aquatics Championships
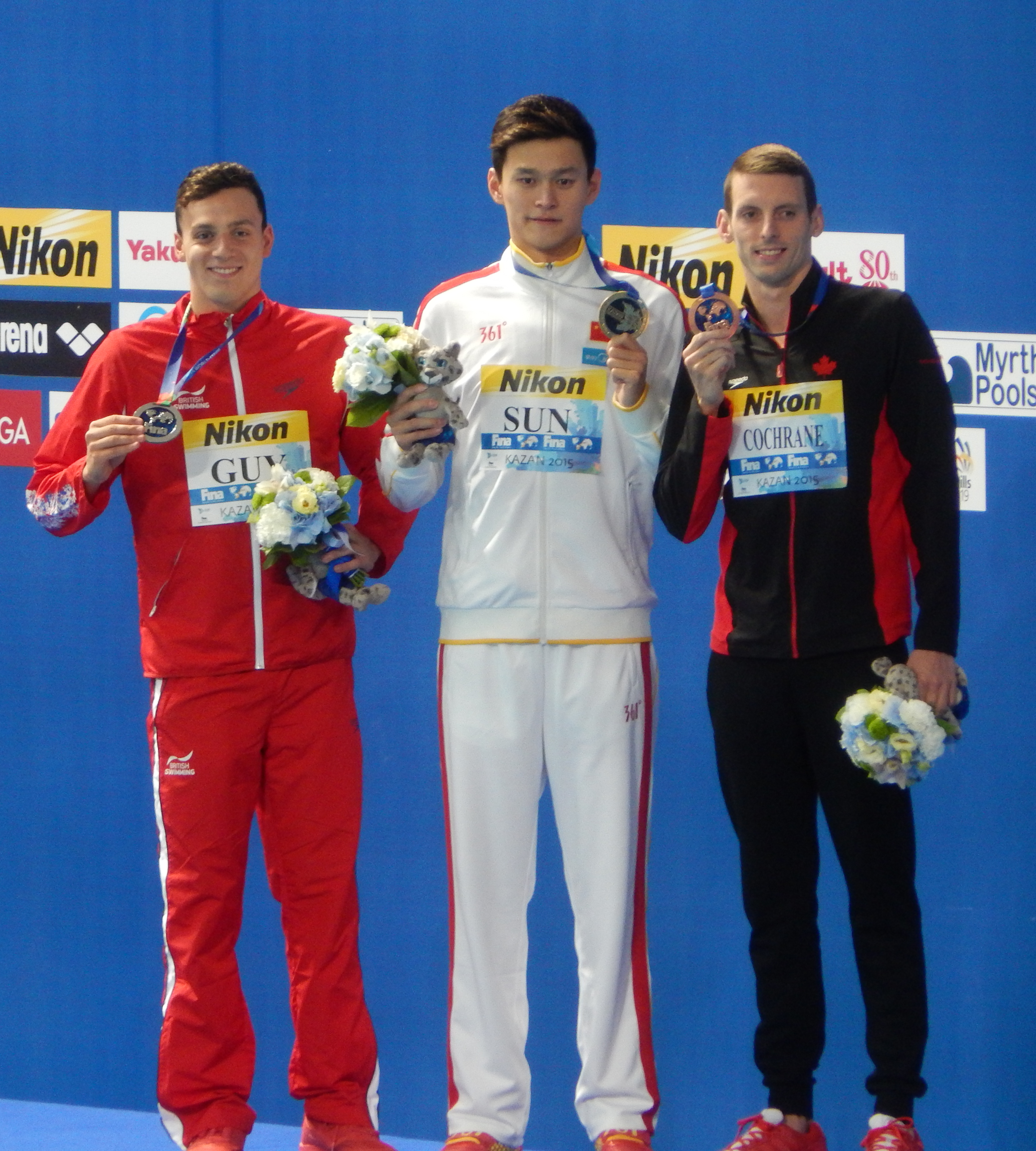
- Victory Ceremony
- Dates: 2 August (heats and final)
- Competitors: 68 from 58 nations
- Winning time: 3:42.58

Medalists
gold medal	Sun Yang	China
silver medal	James Guy	Great Britain
bronze medal	Ryan Cochrane	Canada

The men's 400 metre freestyle competition of the swimming events at the 2015 World Aquatics Championships was held on 2 August with the heats and the final.

== Records ==
Prior to the competition, the existing world and championship records were as follows.

World record	Paul Biedermann (GER)	3:40.07	Rome, Italy	26 July 2009
Competition record	Paul Biedermann (GER)	3:40.07	Rome, Italy	26 July 2009

== Results ==
=== Heats ===
The heats were held at 09:48.

Rank	Heat	Lane	Name	Nationality	Time	Notes
1	6	4	Sun Yang	China	3:44.99	Q
2	6	5	James Guy	Great Britain	3:45.37	Q
3	6	6	Ryan Cochrane	Canada	3:45.86	Q
4	7	3	Connor Jaeger	United States	3:46.03	Q
5	4	4	Wojciech Wojdak	Poland	3:46.67	Q
6	6	7	Michael McBroom	United States	3:46.69	Q
7	7	1	Péter Bernek	Hungary	3:46.83	Q
8	6	1	Clemens Rapp	Germany	3:47.19	Q
9	6	2	Florian Vogel	Germany	3:47.34	
10	7	5	David McKeon	Australia	3:47.36	
11	7	4	Mack Horton	Australia	3:47.37	
12	5	9	Filip Zaborowski	Poland	3:47.59	
13	6	9	Henrik Christiansen	Norway	3:47.71	
14	7	6	Nicholas Grainger	Great Britain	3:47.95	
15	5	2	Ahmed Akram	Egypt	3:48.07	NR
16	5	8	Marwan El-Kamash	Egypt	3:48.15	
17	7	9	Mads Glæsner	Denmark	3:48.78	
18	7	2	Myles Brown	South Africa	3:48.86	
19	6	3	Velimir Stjepanović	Serbia	3:49.49	
20	5	1	Felix Auböck	Austria	3:50.04	
21	4	8	Nezir Karap	Turkey	3:50.07	
21	5	5	Miguel Durán	Spain	3:50.07	
23	5	4	Jeremy Bagshaw	Canada	3:50.54	
24	3	4	Cristian Quintero	Venezuela	3:50.89	
25	7	0	Damien Joly	France	3:50.89	
26	4	6	Li Yunqi	China	3:51.30	
27	7	7	Andrea Mitchell D'Arrigo	Italy	3:51.31	
28	3	3	Martin Bau	Slovenia	3:51.44	
29	4	1	Marcelo Acosta	El Salvador	3:51.45	
30	5	0	Ahmed Mathlouthi	Tunisia	3:51.46	
31	4	5	Lander Hendrickx	Belgium	3:51.61	
32	3	2	Richárd Nagy	Slovakia	3:51.63	
33	5	7	David Brandl	Austria	3:51.83	
34	5	6	Aleksandr Krasnykh	Russia	3:51.93	
35	6	0	Tsubasa Amai	Japan	3:52.06	
36	4	9	Ido Haber	Israel	3:52.08	NR
37	7	8	Ferry Weertman	Netherlands	3:52.18	
38	3	5	Martin Naidich	Argentina	3:52.43	
39	5	3	Mykhailo Romanchuk	Ukraine	3:52.76	
40	4	7	Matias Koski	Finland	3:52.86	
41	2	2	Christian Bayo	Puerto Rico	3:53.61	
42	4	3	Serhiy Frolov	Ukraine	3:53.64	
43	6	8	Jan Micka	Czech Republic	3:53.79	
44	4	0	Jean-Baptiste Febo	Switzerland	3:54.47	
45	2	6	Sven Arnar Saemundsson	Croatia	3:55.43	
46	3	7	Alexei Sancov	Moldova	3:55.83	
47	4	2	Matthew Stanley	New Zealand	3:56.71	
48	3	6	Mateo de Angulo	Colombia	3:57.01	
49	3	0	Tomas Peribonio	Ecuador	3:57.21	
50	3	1	Yeo Kai Quan	Singapore	3:57.44	
51	2	5	Alin Artimon	Romania	3:57.79	
52	1	5	Khader Baqlah	Jordan	3:58.71	
53	2	4	Welson Sim	Malaysia	3:58.75	
54	2	0	Irakli Revishvili	Georgia	4:00.68	
55	2	8	Luis Ventura	Mexico	4:00.79	
56	2	1	Tanakrit Kittiya	Thailand	4:01.59	
57	3	8	Jessie Lacuna	Philippines	4:01.61	
58	2	3	Raphaël Stacchiotti	Luxembourg	4:01.63	
59	2	7	Ensar Hajder	Bosnia and Herzegovina	4:02.41	
60	3	9	Saurabh Sangvekar	India	4:02.57	
61	2	9	Alex Sobers	Barbados	4:05.07	
62	1	4	Iacovos Hadjiconstantinou	Cyprus	4:06.38	
63	1	3	Geoffrey Butler	Cayman Islands	4:07.41	
64	1	7	Klavio Meca	Albania	4:08.18	
65	1	6	Ahmed Gebrel	Palestine	4:09.97	
66	1	2	Brandon Schuster	Samoa	4:15.30	
67	1	1	Haris Bandey	Pakistan	4:31.90	
68	1	8	Andrianirina Lalanomena	Madagascar	4:49.08	

=== Final ===
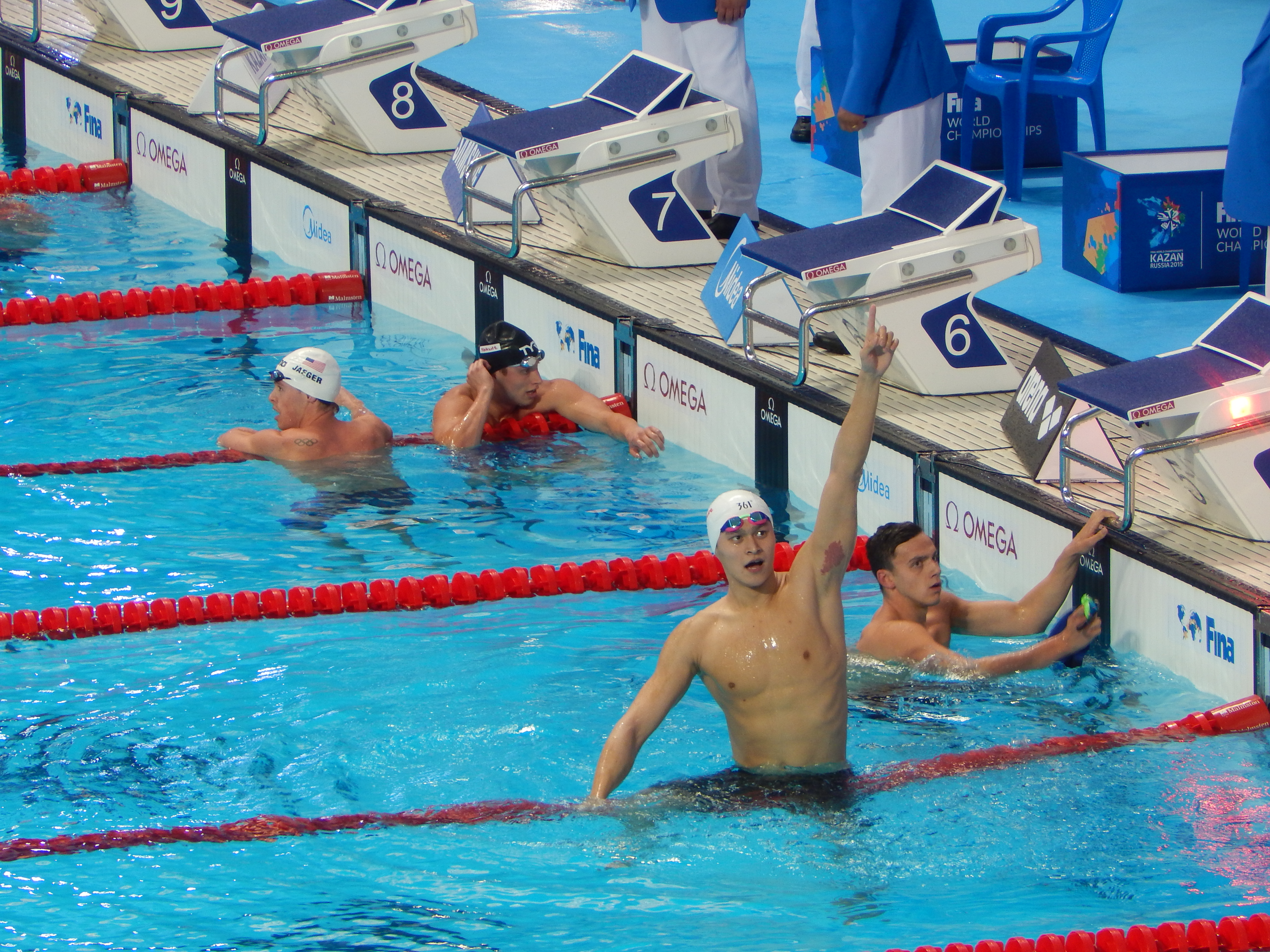
Sun Yang wins the final heat

The final was held at 17:42.

Rank	Lane	Name	Nationality	Time	Notes
1st place, gold medalist(s)	4	Sun Yang	China	3:42.58	
2nd place, silver medalist(s)	5	James Guy	Great Britain	3:43.75	NR
3rd place, bronze medalist(s)	3	Ryan Cochrane	Canada	3:44.59	
4	6	Connor Jaeger	United States	3:44.81	
5	1	Péter Bernek	Hungary	3:46.29	
6	2	Wojciech Wojdak	Poland	3:46.81	
7	8	Clemens Rapp	Germany	3:48.52	
8	7	Michael McBroom	United States	3:51.94	
