= Germany at the 2015 World Aquatics Championships =

- Flag of Germany
- World Aquatics code: GER
- National federation: Deutscher Schwimm-Verband
- Website: www.dsv.de/home

in Kazan, Russia
- Competitors: 53 in 5 sports
- Medals Ranked 12th: Gold 2 Silver 1 Bronze 4 Total 7

World Aquatics Championships appearances
- 1991; 1994; 1998; 2001; 2003; 2005; 2007; 2009; 2011; 2013; 2015; 2017; 2019; 2022; 2023; 2024; 2025

Other related appearances
- East Germany (1973–1986); West Germany (1973–1986)

Germany competed at the 2015 World Aquatics Championships in Kazan, Russia from 24 July to 9 August 2015.

== Medalists ==
Medal	Name	Sport	Event	Date
Gold	Rob Muffels; Christian Reichert; Isabelle Härle	Open water swimming	Mixed team	30 July
Gold	Marco Koch	Swimming	Men's 200 m breaststroke	7 August
Silver	Rob Muffels	Open water swimming	Men's 5 km	25 July
Bronze	Finnia Wunram	Open water swimming	Women's 5 km	25 July
Bronze	Angela Maurer	Open water swimming	Women's 25 km	1 August
Bronze	Paul Biedermann	Swimming	Men's 200 m freestyle	4 August
Bronze	Jan-Philip Glania; Hendrik Feldwehr; Alexandra Wenk; Annika Bruhn	Swimming	Mixed 4 × 100 m medley relay	5 August

== Diving ==
Germany nominated 14 athletes to participate.

Men

Athlete	Event	Preliminaries		Semifinals		Final	
Athlete	Event	Points	Rank	Points	Rank	Points	Rank
Timo Barthel	1 m springboard	324.35	21	—N/a		Did not advance	
Oliver Homuth	1 m springboard	353.00	14	—N/a		Did not advance	
Patrick Hausding	3 m springboard	468.25	6 Q	472.80	8 Q	67.50	12
Stephan Feck	3 m springboard	418.30	19	Did not advance			
Sascha Klein	10 m platform	476.20	7 Q	487.05	7 Q	445.55	11
Martin Wolfram	10 m platform	487.90	6 Q	407.90	14	Did not advance	
Stephan Feck; Patrick Hausding	3 m synchronized springboard	410.85	6 Q	—N/a		406.80	6
Patrick Hausding; Sascha Klein	10 m synchronized platform	421.92	4 Q	—N/a		431.34	6

Women

Athlete	Event	Preliminaries		Semifinals		Final	
Athlete	Event	Points	Rank	Points	Rank	Points	Rank
Louisa Stawczynski	1 m springboard	212.95	28	—N/a		Did not advance	
Nora Subschinski	1 m springboard	248.10	10 Q	—N/a		265.25	7
Tina Punzel	3 m springboard	249.60	30	Did not advance			
Nora Subschinski	3 m springboard	282.45	18 Q	280.95	15	Did not advance	
Maria Kurjo	10 m platform	295.00	=24	Did not advance			
Elena Wassen	10 m platform	295.00	=24	Did not advance			
Tina Punzel; Nora Subschinski	3 m synchronized springboard	265.50	12 Q	—N/a		278.40	11
Tina Punzel; Christina Wassen	10 m synchronized platform	278.70	10 Q	—N/a		285.00	10

Mixed

Athlete	Event	Final	
Athlete	Event	Points	Rank
Timo Barthel; Christina Wassen	3 m synchronized springboard	287.94	8
Dominik Stein; My Phan	10 m synchronized platform	260.46	14
Tina Punzel; Martin Wolfram	Team	348.95	11

== High diving ==
Germany nominated 1 athlete to participate.

Athlete	Event	Points	Rank
Anna Bader	Women's high diving	194.00	7

== Open water swimming ==
Germany nominated eight athletes to participate.

Men

Athlete	Event	Time	Rank
Rob Muffels	5 km	55:17.6	2nd place, silver medalist(s)
Christian Reichert	10 km	1:50:46.4	18
Alexander Studzinski	25 km	4:59:11.9	9
Andreas Waschburger	10 km	1:50:41.4	16
Andreas Waschburger	25 km	5:00:19.2	11
Florian Wellbrock	5 km	55:20.6	5

Women

Athlete	Event	Time	Rank
Isabelle Härle	10 km	1:58:30.0	7
Angela Maurer	10 km	1:59:35.5	23
Angela Maurer	25 km	5:15:07.6	3rd place, bronze medalist(s)
Finnia Wunram	5 km	58:51.0	3rd place, bronze medalist(s)
Finnia Wunram	25 km	5:19:02.5	5

Team

Athlete	Event	Time	Rank
Isabelle Härle; Rob Muffels; Christian Reichert	Team	55:14.4	1st place, gold medalist(s)

== Swimming ==
German swimmers have achieved qualifying standards in the following events (up to a maximum of 2 swimmers in each event at the A-standard entry time, and 1 at the B-standard): Swimmers must qualify at the 2015 German Swimming Championships and the 2015 German Open (for pool events) to confirm their places for the Worlds.

Thirty-one swimmers have been nominated to the German team including world record holder Paul Biedermann in the freestyle and 2013 Worlds silver medalist Marco Koch in the breaststroke.

Men

Athlete	Event	Heat		Semifinal		Final	
Athlete	Event	Time	Rank	Time	Rank	Time	Rank
Paul Biedermann	100 m freestyle	DNS		Did not advance			
Paul Biedermann	200 m freestyle	1:46.20	3 Q	1:46.20	6 Q	1:45.38	3rd place, bronze medalist(s)
Steffen Deibler	100 m butterfly	51.90	10 Q	52.07	11	Did not advance	
Christian Diener	100 m backstroke	54.75	24	Did not advance			
Christian Diener	200 m backstroke	1:57.42	7 Q	1:57.17	9	Did not advance	
Hendrik Feldwehr	50 m breaststroke	27.41	9 Q	27.31	10	Did not advance	
Hendrik Feldwehr	100 m breaststroke	59.67	6 Q	59.63	6 Q	1:00.16	8
Jan-Philip Glania	100 m backstroke	53.78	10 Q	53.78	13	Did not advance	
Jacob Heidtmann	400 m individual medley	4:13.62	6 Q	—N/a		4:12.08	5
Marco Koch	200 m breaststroke	2:09.12	1 Q	2:08.34	2 Q	2:07.76	1st place, gold medalist(s)
Alexander Kunert	200 m butterfly	1:57.28	16 Q	1:57.29	14	Did not advance	
Sören Meißner	800 m freestyle	7:57.93	22	—N/a		Did not advance	
Sören Meißner	1500 m freestyle	15:30.02	29	—N/a		Did not advance	
Clemens Rapp	200 m freestyle	1:48.20	21	Did not advance			
Clemens Rapp	400 m freestyle	3:47.19	8 Q	—N/a		3:48.52	7
Carl Schwarz	50 m backstroke	25.12	9 Q	25.20	15	Did not advance	
Ruwen Straub	1500 m freestyle	15:04.80	14	—N/a		Did not advance	
Florian Vogel	400 m freestyle	3:47.34	9	—N/a		Did not advance	
Florian Vogel	800 m freestyle	7:53.61	15	—N/a		Did not advance	
Christian vom Lehn	100 m breaststroke	1:00.01	12 Q	59.88	10	Did not advance	
Christian vom Lehn	200 m breaststroke	2:10.71	14 Q	2:11.26	16	Did not advance	
Kevin Wedel	200 m individual medley	DNS		Did not advance			
Kevin Wedel	400 m individual medley	4:17.42	15	—N/a		Did not advance	
Maximilian Oswald; Steffen Deibler; Marco di Carli; Paul Biedermann	4 × 100 m freestyle relay	3:16.01	11	—N/a		Did not advance	
Jacob Heidtmann; Clemens Rapp; Christoph Fildebrandt; Paul Biedermann; Florian Vogel*	4 × 200 m freestyle relay	7:09.34	4 Q	—N/a		7:09.01	5
Paul Biedermann; Steffen Deibler; Jan-Philip Glania; Christian vom Lehn	4 × 100 m medley relay	3:32.94	5 Q	—N/a		3:32.16	7

Women

Athlete	Event	Heat		Semifinal		Final	
Athlete	Event	Time	Rank	Time	Rank	Time	Rank
Leonie Beck	800 m freestyle	8:28.39	9	—N/a		Did not advance	
Leonie Beck	1500 m freestyle	16:13.73	9	—N/a		Did not advance	
Dorothea Brandt	50 m freestyle	24.71	6 Q	24.75	10	Did not advance	
Annika Bruhn	100 m freestyle	55.75	33	Did not advance			
Johanna Friedrich	200 m freestyle	DNS		Did not advance			
Johanna Friedrich	400 m freestyle	4:12.09	19	—N/a		Did not advance	
Lisa Graf	100 m backstroke	1:00.71	19	Did not advance			
Lisa Graf	200 m backstroke	2:09.68	9 Q	2:09.40	9	Did not advance	
Vanessa Grimberg	100 m breaststroke	1:08.04	23	Did not advance			
Vanessa Grimberg	200 m breaststroke	2:25.74	14 Q	2:25.36	14	Did not advance	
Isabelle Härle	1500 m freestyle	16:25.04	12	—N/a		Did not advance	
Franziska Hentke	200 m butterfly	2:08.31	7 Q	2:06.64	2 Q	2:06.78	4
Franziska Hentke	400 m individual medley	4:43.51	17	—N/a		Did not advance	
Sarah Köhler	400 m freestyle	4:09.21	12	—N/a		Did not advance	
Sarah Köhler	800 m freestyle	8:26.16	7 Q	—N/a		8:23.67	7
Jenny Mensing	100 m backstroke	1:00.97	21	Did not advance			
Jenny Mensing	200 m backstroke	2:09.43	6 Q	2:09.16	8 Q	2:08.49	5
Theresa Michalak	200 m individual medley	2:17.12	30	Did not advance			
Alexandra Wenk	100 m butterfly	58.05	6 Q	57.77	7 Q	58.22	8
Annika Bruhn; Dorothea Brandt; Alexandra Wenk; Marlene Hüther	4 × 100 m freestyle relay	3:41.56	13	—N/a		Did not advance	
Alexandra Wenk; Annika Bruhn; Marlene Hüther; Johanna Friedrich	4 × 200 m freestyle relay	8:01.48	12	—N/a		Did not advance	
Annika Bruhn; Lisa Graf; Vanessa Grimberg; Jenny Mensing; Alexandra Wenk	4 × 100 m medley relay	4:01.40	11	—N/a		Did not advance	

Mixed

Athlete	Event	Heat		Final	
Athlete	Event	Time	Rank	Time	Rank
Christoph Fildebrandt; Marco di Carli; Alexandra Wenk; Marlene Hüther	4 × 100 m freestyle relay	3:28.99	11	Did not advance	
Jan-Philip Glania; Hendrik Feldwehr; Alexandra Wenk; Annika Bruhn	4 × 100 m medley relay	3:45.39	3 Q	3:44.13 NR	3rd place, bronze medalist(s)

== Synchronized swimming ==
Germany nominated 1 athlete to participate.

Athlete	Event	Preliminaries		Final	
Athlete	Event	Points	Rank	Points	Rank
Marlene Bojer	Solo free routine	77.0667	17	Did not advance	
Marlene Bojer	Solo technical routine	76.2452	18	Did not advance	
