= Palestine at the 2023 World Aquatics Championships =

- Flag of Palestine
- World Aquatics code: PLE
- National federation: Palestinian Swimming Federation and Aquatic Sports

in Fukuoka, Japan
- Competitors: 4 in 1 sport
- Medals: Gold 0 Silver 0 Bronze 0 Total 0

World Aquatics Championships appearances
- 1973; 1975; 1978; 1982; 1986; 1991; 1994; 1998; 2001; 2003; 2005; 2007; 2009; 2011; 2013; 2015; 2017; 2019; 2022; 2023; 2024; 2025

Palestine is set to compete at the 2023 World Aquatics Championships in Fukuoka, Japan from 14 to 30 July.

== Swimming ==
Palestine entered 4 swimmers.

Men

Athlete	Event	Heat		Semifinal		Final	
Athlete	Event	Time	Rank	Time	Rank	Time	Rank
Mahmoud Abu Gharbieh	50 metre freestyle	24.88	84	Did not advance			
Mahmoud Abu Gharbieh	200 metre freestyle	1:56.37	58	Did not advance			
Yazan Al-Bawwab	100 metre freestyle	52.01	72	Did not advance			
Yazan Al-Bawwab	100 metre backstroke	57.16	45	Did not advance			

Women

Athlete	Event	Heat		Semifinal		Final	
Athlete	Event	Time	Rank	Time	Rank	Time	Rank
Marina Abu Shamaleh	50 metre freestyle	28.45	71	Did not advance			
Marina Abu Shamaleh	50 metre breaststroke	34.86	40	Did not advance			
Valerie Tarazi	100 metre breaststroke	1:13.95	49	Did not advance			
Valerie Tarazi	200 metre breaststroke	2:38.88	30	Did not advance			
