= Palestine at the 2015 World Aquatics Championships =

- Flag of Palestine
- FINA code: PLE
- National federation: Palestine Swimming Federation

in Kazan, Russia
- Competitors: 3 in 1 sport
- Medals: Gold 0 Silver 0 Bronze 0 Total 0

World Aquatics Championships appearances
- 1973; 1975; 1978; 1982; 1986; 1991; 1994; 1998; 2001; 2003; 2005; 2007; 2009; 2011; 2013; 2015; 2017; 2019; 2022; 2023; 2024

Palestine competed at the 2015 World Aquatics Championships in Kazan, Russia from 24 July to 9 August 2015.

== Swimming ==
Palestinian swimmers have achieved qualifying standards in the following events (up to a maximum of 2 swimmers in each event at the A-standard entry time, and 1 at the B-standard):

Men

| Athlete | Event | Heat | | Semifinal | | Final | |
| Athlete | Event | Time | Rank | Time | Rank | Time | Rank |
|---|---|---|---|---|---|---|---|
| Mohammad Abdo | 50 m freestyle | 25.84 | 81 | did not advance | | | |
| Ahmed Gebrel | 200 m freestyle | 1:58.54 | 72 | did not advance | | | |
| Ahmed Gebrel | 400 m freestyle | 4:09.97 | 65 | — | | did not advance | |

Women

| Athlete | Event | Heat | | Semifinal | | Final | |
| Athlete | Event | Time | Rank | Time | Rank | Time | Rank |
|---|---|---|---|---|---|---|---|
| Miri Al-Atrash | 50 m freestyle | 30.25 | 92 | did not advance | | | |
