= Palestine at the 2022 World Aquatics Championships =

- Flag of Palestine
- World Aquatics code: PLE
- National federation: Palestine Swimming Federation

in Budapest, Hungary
- Competitors: 4 in 1 sport
- Medals: Gold 0 Silver 0 Bronze 0 Total 0

World Aquatics Championships appearances
- 1973; 1975; 1978; 1982; 1986; 1991; 1994; 1998; 2001; 2003; 2005; 2007; 2009; 2011; 2013; 2015; 2017; 2019; 2022; 2023; 2024; 2025

Palestine competed at the 2022 World Aquatics Championships in Budapest, Hungary from 17 June to 3 July.

== Swimming ==
Palestine entered two swimmers.

Men

Athlete	Event	Heat		Semifinal		Final	
Athlete	Event	Time	Rank	Time	Rank	Time	Rank
Mahmoud Abu Gharbieh	50 m butterfly	26.89	59	did not advance			
Mahmoud Abu Gharbieh	100 m butterfly	58.36	55	did not advance			
Yazan Al-Bawwab	100 m freestyle	53.46	72	did not advance			
Yazan Al-Bawwab	100 m backstroke	59.31	38	did not advance			

Women

Athlete	Event	Heat		Semifinal		Final	
Athlete	Event	Time	Rank	Time	Rank	Time	Rank
Marina Abu Shamaleh	50 m freestyle	28.52	60	did not advance			
Marina Abu Shamaleh	100 m breaststroke	1:15.80	45	did not advance			
Daniella Nafal	50 m butterfly	33.25	59	did not advance			
Daniella Nafal	100 m butterfly	1:18.67	31	did not advance			
