= Ecuador at the 2015 World Aquatics Championships =

- Flag of Ecuador
- FINA code: ECU
- National federation: Federación Ecuatoriana de Natación
- Website: www.fena-ecuador.org

in Kazan, Russia
- Competitors: 6 in 2 sports
- Medals: Gold 0 Silver 0 Bronze 0 Total 0

World Aquatics Championships appearances
- 1973; 1975; 1978; 1982; 1986; 1991; 1994; 1998; 2001; 2003; 2005; 2007; 2009; 2011; 2013; 2015; 2017; 2019; 2022; 2023; 2024

Ecuador competed at the 2015 World Aquatics Championships in Kazan, Russia from 24 July to 9 August 2015.

== Open water swimming ==
Ecuador fielded a full team of five swimmers to compete in the open water marathon.

Athlete	Event	Time	Rank
Esteban Enderica	Men's 10 km	1:50:48.3	20
Ivan Enderica Ochoa	Men's 5 km	55:26.3	15
Ivan Enderica Ochoa	Men's 10 km	1:51:54.5	34
Santiago Enderica	Men's 5 km	55:32.3	25
Santiago Enderica	Men's 25 km	4:56:59.4	7
Samantha Arévalo	Women's 10 km	1:58:46.9	12
Nataly Caldas	Women's 5 km	1:01:10.2	25
Nataly Caldas	Women's 10 km	1:58:46.9	12
Samantha Arévalo; Esteban Enderica; Ivan Enderica Ochoa	Mixed team	56:45.9	9

== Swimming ==
Ecuadorian swimmers have achieved qualifying standards in the following events (up to a maximum of 2 swimmers in each event at the A-standard entry time, and 1 at the B-standard):

Men

Athlete	Event	Heat		Semifinal		Final	
Athlete	Event	Time	Rank	Time	Rank	Time	Rank
Esteban Enderica	800 m freestyle	8:03.17	26	—		did not advance	
Esteban Enderica	1500 m freestyle	15:20.58	22	—		did not advance	
Tomas Peribonio	200 m freestyle	1:51.78	53	did not advance			
Tomas Peribonio	400 m freestyle	3:57.21	49	—		did not advance	

Women

Athlete	Event	Heat		Final	
Athlete	Event	Time	Rank	Time	Rank
Samantha Arévalo	400 m freestyle	4:20.47	34	did not advance	
Samantha Arévalo	800 m freestyle	8:41.15	21	did not advance	
Samantha Arévalo	1500 m freestyle	16:48.52	21	did not advance	
