= Palestine at the 2017 World Aquatics Championships =

- Flag of Palestine
- FINA code: PLE
- National federation: Palestine Swimming Federation

in Budapest, Hungary
- Competitors: 3 in 1 sport
- Medals: Gold 0 Silver 0 Bronze 0 Total 0

World Aquatics Championships appearances
- 1973; 1975; 1978; 1982; 1986; 1991; 1994; 1998; 2001; 2003; 2005; 2007; 2009; 2011; 2013; 2015; 2017; 2019; 2022; 2023; 2024

Palestine competed at the 2017 World Aquatics Championships in Budapest, Hungary from 14 July to 30 July.

== Swimming ==
Palestine has received a Universality invitation from FINA to send three swimmers (two men and one woman) to the World Championships.

Athlete	Event	Heat		Semifinal		Final	
Athlete	Event	Time	Rank	Time	Rank	Time	Rank
Nabeel Hatoum	Men's 100 m freestyle	56.08	92	did not advance			
Nabeel Hatoum	Men's 50 m backstroke	30.69	49	did not advance			
Loiy Juwaihan	Men's 50 m freestyle	26.29	=103	did not advance			
Salie Al-Atrash	Women's 50 m freestyle	30.82	75	did not advance			
