= Open water swimming at the 2015 World Aquatics Championships – Men's 25 km =

Men 25 km swimming, World Aquatic Championship, Aug 2015

Men's 25 km at the 2015 World Aquatics Championships
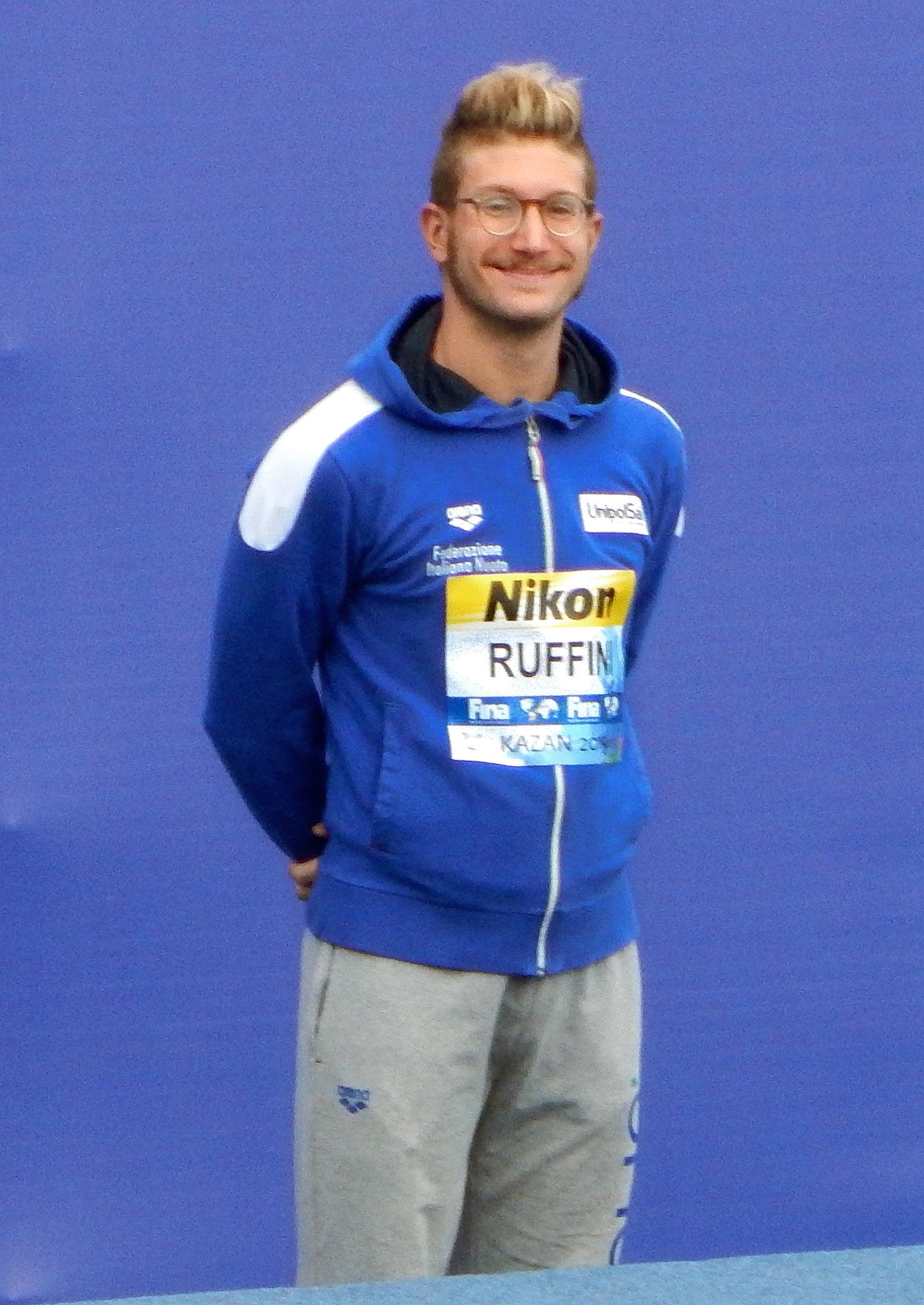
- Winner of the race
- Dates: 1 August
- Competitors: 32 from 21 nations
- Winning time: 4:53:10.7

Medalists
gold medal	Simone Ruffini	Italy
silver medal	Alex Meyer	United States
bronze medal	Matteo Furlan	Italy

The Men's 25 km competition of the open water swimming events at the 2015 World Aquatics Championships was held on 1 August 2015.

== Results ==
The race was started at 08:00.

Rank	Swimmer	Nationality	Time
1st place, gold medalist(s)	Simone Ruffini	Italy	4:53:10.7
2nd place, silver medalist(s)	Alex Meyer	United States	4:53:15.1
3rd place, bronze medalist(s)	Matteo Furlan	Italy	4:54:38.0
4	Axel Reymond	France	4:55:55.8
5	Erwin Maldonado	Venezuela	4:56:00.4
6	Sam Sheppard	Australia	4:56:22.9
7	Santiago Enderica	Ecuador	4:56:59.4
8	Evgeny Drattsev	Russia	4:57:11.9
9	Alexander Studzinski	Germany	4:59:11.9
10	David Heron	United States	5:00:11.5
11	Andreas Waschburger	Germany	5:00:19.2
12	Yuval Safra	Israel	5:02:52.9
13	Vitaliy Khudyakov	Kazakhstan	5:03:16.3
14	Evgenij Pop Acev	North Macedonia	5:04:43.4
15	Matěj Kozubek	Czech Republic	5:05:22.3
16	Allan do Carmo	Brazil	5:06:27.9
17	Jarrod Poort	Australia	5:07:44.5
18	Diogo Villarinho	Brazil	5:11:04.2
19	Vít Ingeduld	Czech Republic	5:13:11.0
20	Dániel Székelyi	Hungary	5:15:03.4
21	Roman Karyakin	Russia	5:15:53.8
22	Ye Qianpeng	China	5:19:01.5
23	Nico Manoussakis	South Africa	5:20:47.2
24	Saleh Mohammad	Syria	5:31:21.1
	Marc-Antoine Olivier	France	DNF
	Haythem Abdelkhalek	Tunisia	DNF
	Shahar Resman	Israel	DNF
	Marcel Schouten	Netherlands	DNF
	Christopher Bryan	Ireland	DNF
	Guillermo Bertola	Argentina	DNF
	Zhang Zibin	China	DNF
	Gabriel Villagoiz	Argentina	DNF
