= Open water swimming at the 2015 World Aquatics Championships – Men's 5 km =

Men's 5 km at the 2015 World Aquatics Championships
- Dates: 25 July
- Competitors: 49 from 30 nations
- Winning time: 55:17.6

Medalists
gold medal	Chad Ho	South Africa
silver medal	Rob Muffels	Germany
bronze medal	Matteo Furlan	Italy

The Men's 5 km competition of the open water swimming events at the 2015 World Aquatics Championships was held on 25 July 2015.

== Results ==
The race was started at 13:00.

Rank	Swimmer	Nationality	Time
1st place, gold medalist(s)	Chad Ho	South Africa	55:17.6
2nd place, silver medalist(s)	Rob Muffels	Germany	55:17.6
3rd place, bronze medalist(s)	Matteo Furlan	Italy	55:20.0
4	Evgeny Drattsev	Russia	55:20.4
5	Florian Wellbrock	Germany	55:20.6
6	David Heron	United States	55:20.7
7	Celeb Hughes	Great Britain	55:21.9
8	Mario Sanzullo	Italy	55:22.7
9	Victor Colonese	Brazil	55:24.4
10	Antonio Arroyo	Spain	55:24.6
11	Alex Meyer	United States	55:25.3
12	Sergey Bolshakov	Russia	55:25.3
13	Márk Papp	Hungary	55:25.3
14	Samuel de Bona	Brazil	55:25.9
15	Ivan Enderica Ochoa	Ecuador	55:26.3
16	Nico Manoussakis	South Africa	55:26.5
17	David Aubry	France	55:28.5
18	Ján Kútnik	Czech Republic	55:28.8
19	Dániel Székelyi	Hungary	55:28.9
20	Jarrod Poort	Australia	55:31.1
21	Ihor Snitko	Ukraine	55:31.7
22	Axel Reymond	France	55:31.8
23	Tom Allen	Great Britain	55:32.0
24	Ihor Chervynskyi	Ukraine	55:32.2
25	Santiago Enderica	Ecuador	55:32.3
26	Yuval Safra	Israel	55:33.2
27	Antonios Fokaidis	Greece	55:33.6
28	Vasco Gaspar	Portugal	55:36.4
29	Vít Ingeduld	Czech Republic	55:38.5
30	Tamás Farkas	Serbia	55:38.6
31	Gustavo Gutiérrez	Peru	55:46.6
32	Sam Sheppard	Australia	55:53.6
33	Wilder Carreño	Venezuela	56:04.3
34	Shai Toledano	Israel	56:06.0
35	Yang Jintong	China	56:07.6
36	Fernando Betanzos	Mexico	58:25.7
37	Lang Yuanpeng	China	59:42.8
38	Kenessary Kenenbayev	Kazakhstan	59:47.0
39	Christian Tirado	Mexico	59:47.8
40	Walter Caballero	Bolivia	59:50.8
41	Ávila Emilio	Guatemala	1:00:31.2
42	Timur Abzhanov	Kazakhstan	1:01:54.2
43	Kwan Ho Yin	Hong Kong	1:02:42.7
44	Cristofer Lanuza	Costa Rica	1:02:49.1
45	Marek Pavúk	Slovakia	1:02:49.4
46	Tse Tsz Fung	Hong Kong	1:03:10.3
47	Abdulla Al-Balooshi	United Arab Emirates	1:09:39.3
	Amgad Elssaflawe	Sudan	OTL
	Ahmed Adam	Sudan	OTL
	Héctor Ruiz	Spain	DNS
	Ivan Šitić	Croatia	DNS
	Ricky Anggawijaya	Indonesia	DNS
