= Open water swimming at the 2015 World Aquatics Championships – Women's 25 km =

Women's 25 km at the 2015 World Aquatics Championships
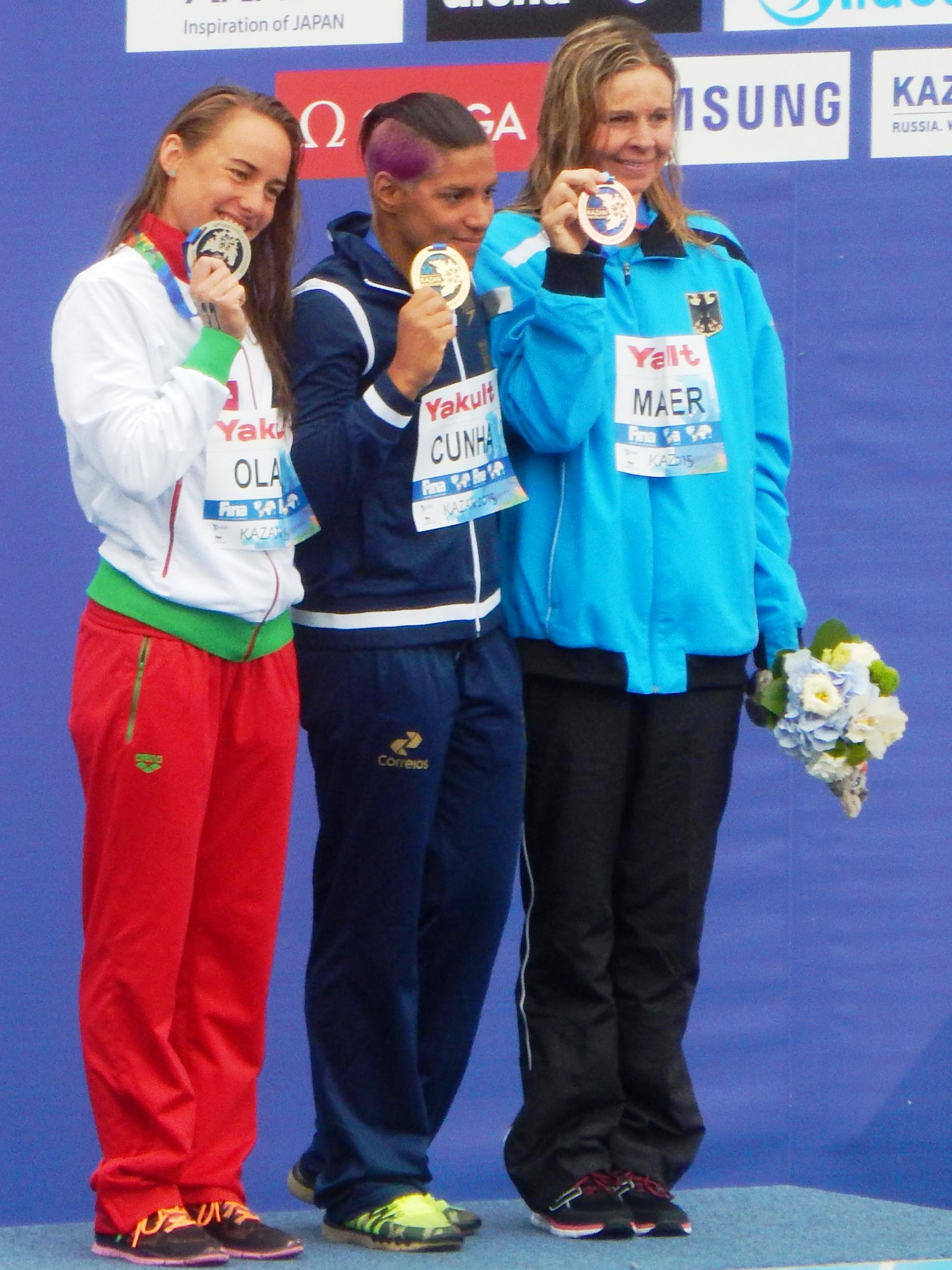
- Victory Ceremony
- Dates: 1 August
- Competitors: 21 from 13 nations
- Winning time: 5:13:47.3

Medalists
| gold medal | Ana Marcela Cunha | Brazil |
| silver medal | Anna Olasz | Hungary |
| bronze medal | Angela Maurer | Germany |

The Women's 25 km competition of the open water swimming events at the 2015 World Aquatics Championships was held on 1 August 2015.

== Results ==
The race was started at 08:00.

| Rank | Swimmer | Nationality | Time |
|---|---|---|---|
| 1st place, gold medalist(s) | Ana Marcela Cunha | Brazil | 5:13:47.3 |
| 2nd place, silver medalist(s) | Anna Olasz | Hungary | 5:14:13.4 |
| 3rd place, bronze medalist(s) | Angela Maurer | Germany | 5:15:07.6 |
| 4 | Aurélie Muller | France | 5:16:07.5 |
| 5 | Finnia Wunram | Germany | 5:19:02.5 |
| 6 | Margarita Domínguez | Spain | 5:19:39.4 |
| 7 | Alice Franco | Italy | 5:19:50.5 |
| 8 | Emily Brunemann | United States | 5:19:51.2 |
| 9 | Ashley Twichell | United States | 5:20:20.8 |
| 10 | Ilaria Raimondi | Italy | 5:21:05.2 |
| 11 | Olga Kozydub | Russia | 5:22:46.1 |
| 12 | Jessica Walker | Australia | 5:23:33.0 |
| 13 | Chelsea Gubecka | Australia | 5:28:49.2 |
| 14 | Nikoletta Kiss | Hungary | 5:30:36.4 |
| 15 | Lenka Štěrbová | Czech Republic | 5:36:09.9 |
| 16 | Yang Dandan | China | 5:42:19.5 |
| 17 | Cao Shiyue | China | 6:02:49.7 |
| | Betina Lorscheitter | Brazil | DNF |
| | Xeniya Romanchuk | Kazakhstan | DNF |
| | Silvie Rybářová | Czech Republic | DNF |
| | Julia Arino | Argentina | DNF |
