= Palestine at the 2024 World Aquatics Championships =

- Flag of Palestine
- FINA code: PLE
- National federation: Palestinian Swimming Federation and Aquatic Sports

in Doha, Qatar
- Competitors: 4 in 1 sport
- Medals: Gold 0 Silver 0 Bronze 0 Total 0

World Aquatics Championships appearances
- 1973; 1975; 1978; 1982; 1986; 1991; 1994; 1998; 2001; 2003; 2005; 2007; 2009; 2011; 2013; 2015; 2017; 2019; 2022; 2023; 2024

Palestine competed at the 2024 World Aquatics Championships in Doha, Qatar from 2 to 18 February.

== Competitors ==
The following is the list of competitors in the Championships.

Sport	Men	Women	Total
Swimming	2	2	4
Total	2	2	4

== Swimming ==
Palestine entered 4 swimmers.

Men

Athlete	Event	Heat		Semifinal		Final	
Athlete	Event	Time	Rank	Time	Rank	Time	Rank
Mahmoud Abu Gharbieh	200 metre freestyle	1:58.24	61	Did not advance			
Mahmoud Abu Gharbieh	400 metre freestyle	4:15.85	52	—		Did not advance	
Yazan Al-Bawwab	100 metre freestyle	52.93	76	Did not advance			
Yazan Al-Bawwab	100 metre backstroke	59.31	48	Did not advance			

Women

Athlete	Event	Heat		Semifinal		Final	
Athlete	Event	Time	Rank	Time	Rank	Time	Rank
Marina Abu Shamaleh	50 metre freestyle	28.51	70	Did not advance			
Marina Abu Shamaleh	100 metre breaststroke	1:14.15	40	Did not advance			
Valerie Tarazi	100 metre backstroke	1:04.41	33	Did not advance			
Valerie Tarazi	200 metre individual medley	2:22.88	22	Did not advance			
