= Chiara Masini Luccetti =

Italian swimmer (born 1993)

Personal information
- Born: 26 March 1993 (age 33)

Sport
- Sport: Swimming
Medal record
Women's swimming
Representing Italy
World Championships (LC)
Silver medal – second place	2015 Kazan	4×200 m freestyle
European Championships (LC)
Gold medal – first place	2014 Berlin	4×200 m freestyle
Mediterranean Games
Gold medal – first place	2013 Mersin	4×200 m freestyle

Chiara Masini Luccetti (born 26 March 1993) is an Italian freestyle swimmer. She competed in the women's 4 × 200 metre freestyle relay event at the 2016 Summer Olympics.
