= Swimming at the 2015 World Aquatics Championships – Women's 1500 metre freestyle =

Women's 1500 metre freestyle at the 2015 World Aquatics Championships
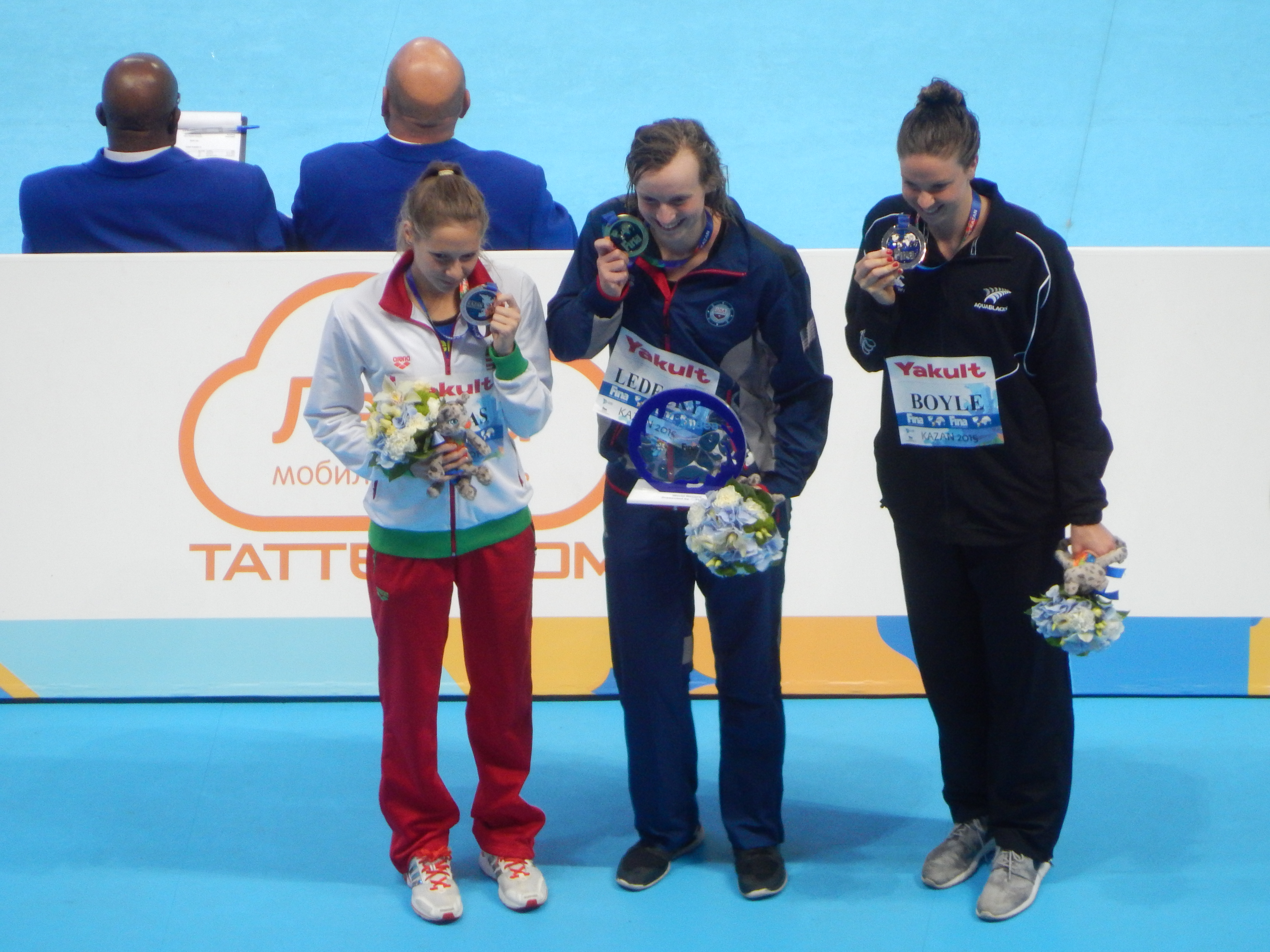
- Medallists
- Dates: 3 August (heats); 4 August (final)
- Competitors: 25 from 21 nations
- Winning time: 15:25.48 WR

Medalists
gold medal	Katie Ledecky	United States
silver medal	Lauren Boyle	New Zealand
bronze medal	Boglárka Kapás	Hungary

The Women's 1500 metre freestyle competition of the swimming events at the 2015 World Aquatics Championships was held on 3 August with the heats and 4 August with the final.

== Records ==
Prior to the competition, the existing world and championship records were as follows.

World record	Katie Ledecky (USA)	15:28.36	Gold Coast, Australia	24 August 2014
Competition record	Katie Ledecky (USA)	15:36.53	Barcelona, Spain	30 July 2013

The following new records were set during this competition.

Date	Event	Name	Nationality	Time	Record
3 August	Heats	Katie Ledecky	United States	15:27.71	WR
4 August	Final	Katie Ledecky	United States	15:25.48	WR

== Results ==
=== Heats ===
The Heats were held at 10:56.

Rank	Heat	Lane	Name	Nationality	Time	Notes
1	3	4	Katie Ledecky	United States	15:27.71	Q, WR
2	2	5	Lotte Friis	Denmark	15:54.23	Q
3	3	5	Jessica Ashwood	Australia	15:56.52	Q, NR
4	2	8	Kristel Köbrich	Chile	16:01.63	Q
5	2	4	Lauren Boyle	New Zealand	16:02.84	Q
6	3	3	Boglárka Kapás	Hungary	16:06.25	Q
7	2	3	Sharon van Rouwendaal	Netherlands	16:09.12	Q
8	3	7	Aurora Ponsele	Italy	16:12.01	Q
9	3	2	Leonie Beck	Germany	16:13.73	
10	2	7	Jessica Thielmann	Great Britain	16:21.21	
11	2	0	Gaja Natlačen	Slovenia	16:24.83	
12	2	6	Isabelle Härle	Germany	16:25.04	
13	3	6	Martina Caramignoli	Italy	16:27.13	
14	3	0	Wang Guoyue	China	16:28.18	
15	2	2	Tjasa Oder	Slovenia	16:31.22	
16	2	1	Julia Hassler	Liechtenstein	16:32.04	
17	1	5	Valerie Gruest	Guatemala	16:34.81	
18	3	1	Katy Campbell	United States	16:39.98	
19	1	4	Monique Olivier	Luxembourg	16:43.21	
20	2	9	Montserrat Ortuño	Mexico	16:43.64	
21	3	8	Samantha Arévalo	Ecuador	16:48.52	
22	3	9	Martina Elhenická	Czech Republic	16:50.22	
23	1	3	Rachel Tseng	Singapore	17:26.53	
24	1	6	Lena Rannvaardottir	Faroe Islands	18:21.09	
25	1	2	Bo-Anne Bos	Curaçao	18:57.27	

=== Final ===
The final was held on 4 August at 18:05.

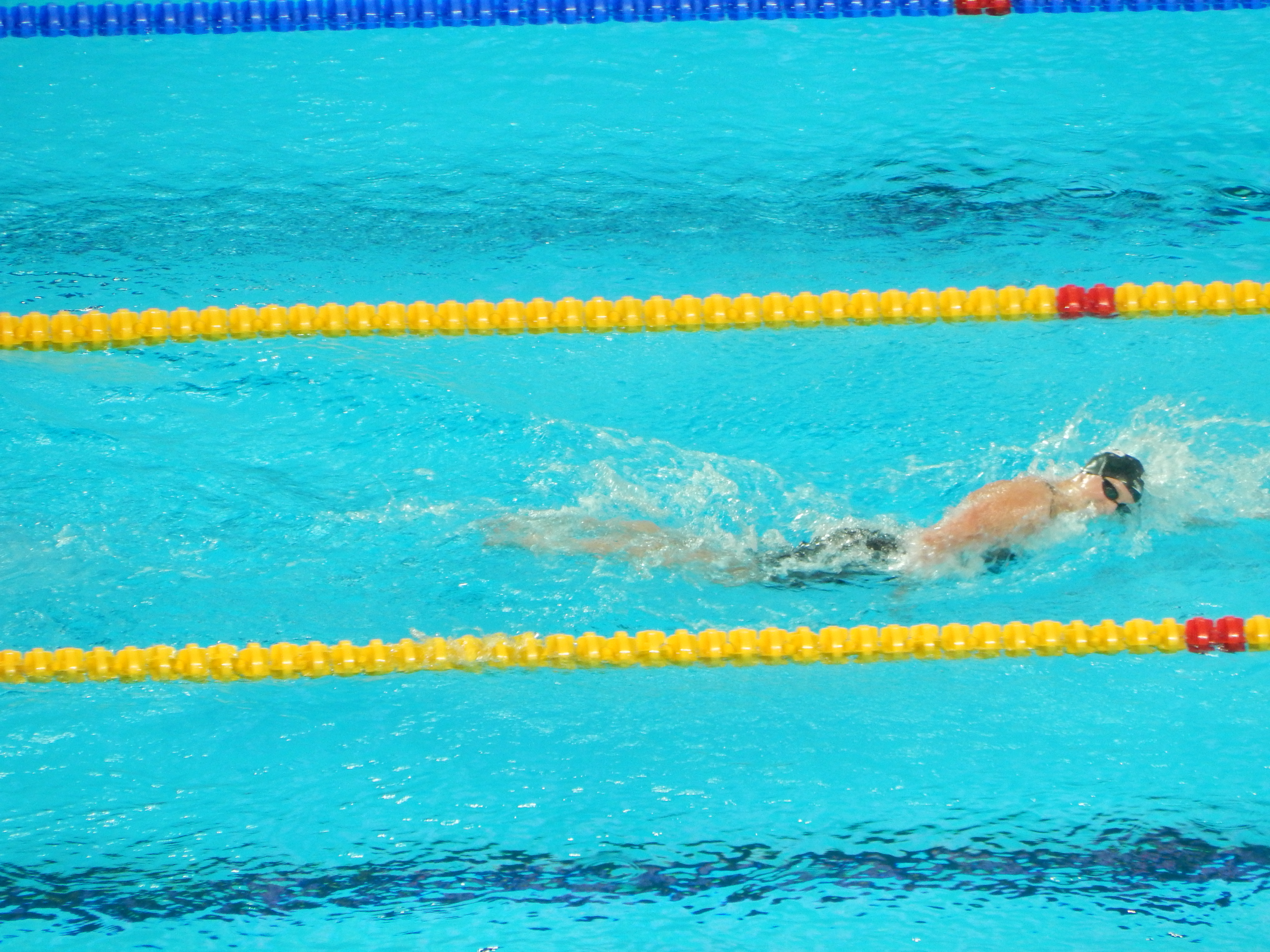
Ledecky swims to gold and WR

Rank	Lane	Name	Nationality	Time	Notes
1st place, gold medalist(s)	4	Katie Ledecky	United States	15:25.48	WR
2nd place, silver medalist(s)	2	Lauren Boyle	New Zealand	15:40.14	OC
3rd place, bronze medalist(s)	7	Boglárka Kapás	Hungary	15:47.09	NR
4	5	Lotte Friis	Denmark	15:49.00	
5	3	Jessica Ashwood	Australia	15:52.17	NR
6	1	Sharon van Rouwendaal	Netherlands	16:03.74	
7	6	Kristel Köbrich	Chile	16:06.55	
8	8	Aurora Ponsele	Italy	16:09.57	
