= Alexandra Wenk =

German swimmer

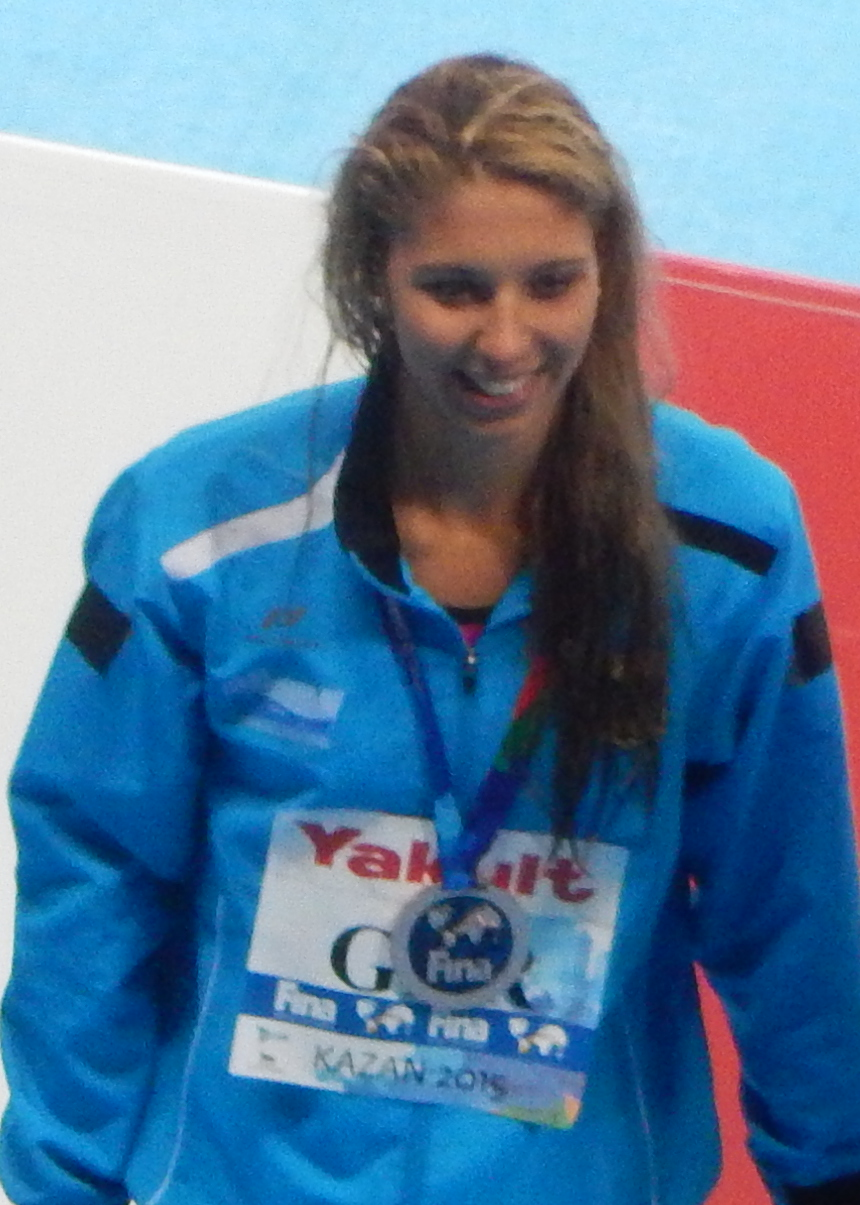
- Wenk at Kazan 2015

Personal information
- Full name: Alexandra Nathalie Wenk
- Born: 7 February 1995 (age 31) Munich, Germany
- Height: 179 cm (5 ft 10 in)
- Weight: 63 kg (139 lb)
Medal record
Women's swimming
Representing Germany
World Championships (LC)
Bronze medal – third place	2015 Kazan	4×100 m mixed medley
European Championships (LC)
Gold medal – first place	2012 Debrecen	4×100 m medley
European Championships (SC)
Bronze medal – third place	2015 Netanya	100 m butterfly

Alexandra Nathalie Wenk (born 7 February 1995) is a German swimmer who competes in the Women's 100 metre butterfly. At the 2012 Summer Olympics, she finished 21st overall in the heats in the Women's 100 metre butterfly and failed to reach the final. At the 2016 Summer Olympics in Rio de Janeiro, she finished in 21st place in the women's 100 m butterfly and did not qualify for the semifinals. She competed in the women's 200 m medley where she finished 11th in the semifinals and did not qualify for the final. She was also a member of the women's 4 × 100 m medley relay team which finished 12th in the heats and did not qualify for the final.

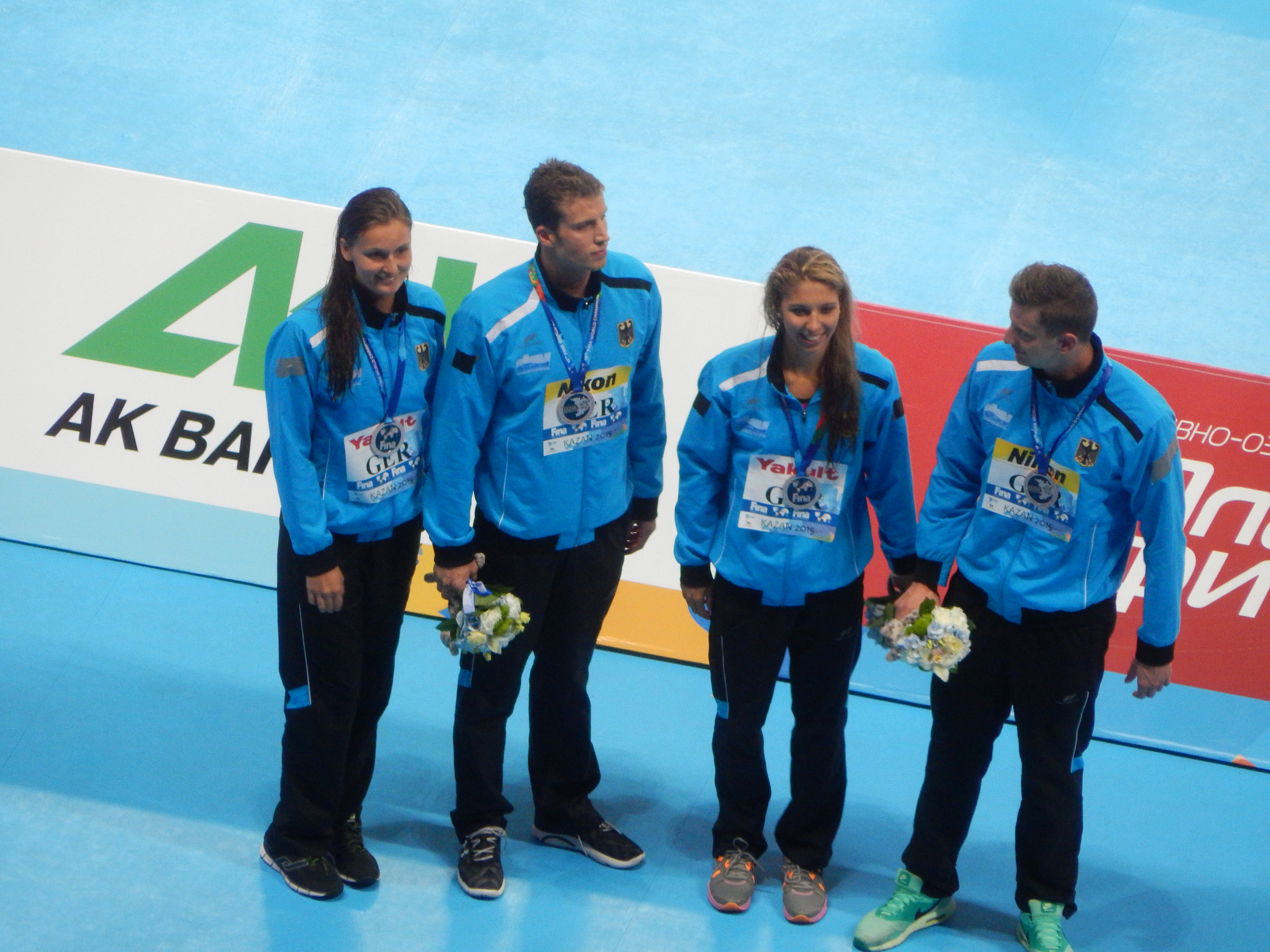
Wenk at Kazan 2015 (2nd from right)

Her Romanian mother Gabriela was an Olympic swimmer for Romania and European Championships silver medalist.
