= Erica Musso =

Italian swimmer

Personal information
- Nationality: Italian
- Born: 29 July 1994 (age 31)

Sport
- Sport: Swimming

Erica Musso (born 29 July 1994) is an Italian swimmer. She competed in the women's 200 metre freestyle event at the 2018 FINA World Swimming Championships (25 m), in Hangzhou, China.
