= Ahmed Gebrel =

Palestinian swimmer (born 1991)

Personal information
- National team: Palestine
- Born: January 22, 1991 (age 35) Cairo, Egypt

Sport
- Sport: Swimming
- Events: Men's 200m, 400m, 800m, 1500m Freestyle / 200m, 400m Medley / 5KM & 10KM Open water

Ahmed Gebrel (born January 22, 1991) is a former Olympic swimmer who was born in Cairo to a Palestinian father and Egyptian mother. He started swimming in Al-Ahly Sporting Club in Egypt at four years old. At that time he held only Palestinian nationality so at age 15 he could represent his country Palestine in 2006. He set Palestinian swimming records in: 100m, 200m, 400m, 800m and 1500m Freestyle, as well as the 200m and 400m Individual Medley.

Gebrel is the first and the only Palestinian swimmer to compete twice in the Olympic Games; he participated at the London 2012 and Rio 2016 Olympic Games. He won titles and awards during his career representing Al-Ahly Sporting club in Egypt, Club Natacion Piera and Club Natacion Barcelona in Spain, and in international competitions representing Palestine. Moreover, he competed in four World FINA Championships in Rome 2009, Shanghai 2011, Barcelona 2013 & Kazan 2015.

He retired in 2016 and started his career as a swimming coach. He began living in United Arab Emirates in 2016 and working for Abu Dhabi Sports Channel as a commentator.

== Olympic career ==
He represented Palestine at the 2012 Summer Olympics, competing in the Men's 400 metre freestyle and finishing in 27th place in the heats. He finished 3rd in his heat; however, he managed to break his own personal best by 9.89 seconds. After his achievement in London 2012, he received an Olympic scholarship in Barcelona to continue his professional career as an international swimmer.

Ahmed made history by representing Palestine in the 2016 Summer Olympics in Rio de Janeiro, as he was the first and so far only Palestinian swimmer to compete twice at the Olympic Games. He completed in the Men's 200 metre freestyle, finishing in 47th place in the heats.
