= Palestine at the 2011 World Aquatics Championships =

Sporting event delegation

Flag of Palestine

Palestine competed at the 2011 World Aquatics Championships in Shanghai, China between July 16 and 31, 2011.

== Swimming ==
Palestine qualified 3 swimmers.

Men

Athlete	Event	Heats		Semifinals		Final	
Athlete	Event	Time	Rank	Time	Rank	Time	Rank
Tawil Majd	Men's 50m Freestyle	26.65	79	did not advance			
Gebrel Ahmed	Men's 200m Freestyle	2:02.27	56	did not advance			
Gebrel Ahmed	Men's 400m Freestyle	4:18.40	44			did not advance	

Women

Athlete	Event	Heats		Semifinals		Final	
Athlete	Event	Time	Rank	Time	Rank	Time	Rank
Hazboun Sabine	Women's 50m Freestyle	29.16	56	did not advance			
Hazboun Sabine	Women's 50m Butterfly	31.12	41	did not advance			
