= High diving at the 2015 World Aquatics Championships – Men =

Men's high diving at the 2015 World Aquatics Championships
- Dates: 3–5 August
- Competitors: 20 from 12 nations
- Winning points: 629.30

Medalists
gold medal	Gary Hunt	Great Britain
silver medal	Jonathan Paredes	Mexico
bronze medal	Artem Silchenko	Russia

The men's competition of the high diving events at the 2015 World Aquatics Championships was held on 3 and 5 August 2015. The competition was divided into five rounds with jumps of 27m.

== Results ==
Round 1–3 were held on 3 August at 14:00. Round 4 was held on 5 August at 14:00. Round 5 was held on 5 August at 14:50.

Rank	Diver	Nationality	Round 1	Round 2	Round 3	Round 4	Round 5	Total
1st place, gold medalist(s)	Gary Hunt	Great Britain	104.50	116.10	161.20	108.30	139.20	629.30
2nd place, silver medalist(s)	Jonathan Paredes	Mexico	106.40	113.95	130.05	106.40	139.65	596.45
3rd place, bronze medalist(s)	Artem Silchenko	Russia	96.90	122.55	119.70	106.40	148.40	593.95
4	David Colturi	United States	104.50	111.80	142.80	91.20	136.40	586.70
5	Andy Jones	United States	96.90	98.90	145.60	102.60	135.15	579.15
6	Orlando Duque	Colombia	96.90	96.75	126.00	100.70	151.20	571.55
7	Steve LoBue	United States	95.00	107.50	139.50	91.20	137.25	570.45
8	Michal Navrátil	Czech Republic	95.00	109.65	119.70	96.90	143.10	564.35
9	Miguel García	Colombia	96.90	96.75	131.60	85.50	137.70	548.45
10	Kris Kolanus	Poland	96.90	118.25	127.50	100.70	102.50	545.85
11	Todor Spasov	Bulgaria	95.00	103.20	121.90	79.80	117.60	517.50
12	Anatoliy Shabotenko	Ukraine	96.90	81.70	140.40	96.90	97.50	513.40
13	Carlos Gimeno	Spain	62.70	109.65	122.40	96.90		391.65
14	Sergio Guzmán	Mexico	77.90	86.00	137.70	74.10		375.70
15	Igor Semashko	Russia	78.75	96.75	106.20	84.60		366.30
16	Alessandro De Rose	Italy	74.10	98.40	85.75	100.70		358.95
17	Jorge Ferzuli	Mexico	87.40	96.00	100.00	74.10		357.50
18	Cyrille Oumedjkane	France	79.80	83.85	85.00	68.40		317.05
19	Ilia Shchurov	Russia	79.80	75.25	75.00	79.80		309.85
	Blake Aldridge	Great Britain	87.40	111.80	88.20	DNS		
