= United States at the 2015 World Aquatics Championships =

- Flag of the United States
- World Aquatics code: USA
- National federation: United States Aquatic Sports
- Website: www.usaquaticsports.org

in Kazan, Russia
- Competitors: 97 in 6 sports
- Medals Ranked 2nd: Gold 13 Silver 14 Bronze 6 Total 33

World Aquatics Championships appearances
- 1973; 1975; 1978; 1982; 1986; 1991; 1994; 1998; 2001; 2003; 2005; 2007; 2009; 2011; 2013; 2015; 2017; 2019; 2022; 2023; 2024; 2025

United States competed at the 2015 World Aquatics Championships in Kazan, Russia from 24 July to 9 August 2015.

== Medalists ==
Medal	Name	Sport	Event	Date
Gold	Haley Anderson	Open water swimming	Women's 5 km	July 25
Gold	Bill May; Christina Jones	Synchronized swimming	Mixed duet technical routine	July 26
Gold	Jordan Wilimovsky	Open water swimming	Men's 10 km	July 27
Gold	Katie Ledecky	Swimming	Women's 400 m freestyle	August 2
Gold	Rachelle Simpson	High diving	Women's high diving	August 4
Gold	Katie Ledecky	Swimming	Women's 1500 m freestyle	August 4
Gold	Katie Ledecky	Swimming	Women's 200 m freestyle	August 5
Gold	Ryan Lochte	Swimming	Men's 200 m individual medley	August 6
Gold	Chelsea Chenault*; Missy Franklin; Katie Ledecky; Katie McLaughlin; Cierra Runge*; Leah Smith; Shannon Vreeland*	Swimming	Women's 4 × 200 m freestyle relay	August 6
Gold	United States women's national water polo team: Kami Craig; Rachel Fattal; Makenzie Fischer; Kaleigh Gilchrist; Ashley Grossman; Samantha Hill; Ashleigh Johnson; Courtney Mathewson; Madeline Musselman; Kiley Neushul; Melissa Seidemann; Margaret Steffens; Alys Williams	Water polo	Women's tournament	August 7
Gold	Katie Ledecky	Swimming	Women's 800 m freestyle	August 8
Gold	Nathan Adrian; Conor Dwyer*; Missy Franklin; Margo Geer*; Ryan Lochte; Simone Manuel; Abbey Weitzeil*	Swimming	Mixed 4 × 100 m freestyle relay	August 8
Gold	Nathan Adrian; Kevin Cordes; Matt Grevers*; Ryan Lochte*; Cody Miller*; Ryan Murphy; Tim Phillips*; Tom Shields	Swimming	Men's 4 × 100 m medley relay	August 9
Silver	Bill May; Kristina Lum	Synchronized swimming	Mixed duet free routine	July 30
Silver	Alex Meyer	Open water swimming	Men's 25 km	August 1
Silver	David Boudia	Diving	Men's 10 m platform	August 2
Silver	Cesilie Carlton	High diving	Women's high diving	August 4
Silver	Kevin Cordes; Margo Geer; Katie McLaughlin; Ryan Murphy; Lia Neal*; Kendyl Stewart*	Swimming	Mixed 4 × 100 m medley relay	August 5
Silver	Cammille Adams	Swimming	Women's 200 m butterfly	August 6
Silver	Micah Lawrence	Swimming	Women's 200 m breaststroke	August 7
Silver	Kevin Cordes	Swimming	Men's 200 m breaststroke	August 7
Silver	Conor Dwyer; Michael Klueh*; Ryan Lochte; Reed Malone; Michael Weiss	Swimming	Men's 4 × 200 m freestyle relay	August 7
Silver	Nathan Adrian	Swimming	Men's 50 m freestyle	August 8
Silver	Missy Franklin	Swimming	Women's 200 m backstroke	August 8
Silver	Matt Grevers	Swimming	Men's 50 m backstroke	August 9
Silver	Connor Jaeger	Swimming	Men's 1500 m freestyle	August 9
Silver	Madeline Dirado	Swimming	Women's 400 m individual medley	August 9
Bronze	Michael Hixon	Diving	Men's 1 m springboard	July 27
Bronze	Missy Franklin; Margo Geer; Simone Manuel; Lia Neal; Shannon Vreeland*; Abbey Weitzeil*	Swimming	Women's 4 × 100 m freestyle relay	August 2
Bronze	Matt Grevers	Swimming	Men's 100 m backstroke	August 4
Bronze	Missy Franklin	Swimming	Women's 200 m freestyle	August 5
Bronze	Kevin Cordes	Swimming	Men's 50 m breaststroke	August 5
Bronze	Chase Kalisz	Swimming	Men's 400 m individual medley	August 9

== Awards ==
- 2015 FINA World Championships: Best Team

== Diving ==
U.S. divers qualified for the individual spots and the synchronized teams at the World Championships.

Men

Athlete	Event	Preliminaries		Semifinals		Final	
Athlete	Event	Points	Rank	Points	Rank	Points	Rank
Michael Hixon	1 m springboard	373.85	9 Q	—N/a		428.30	3rd place, bronze medalist(s)
Kristian Ipsen	1 m springboard	400.75	4 Q	—N/a		420.65	6
Michael Hixon	3 m springboard	421.70	14 Q	441.10	13	Did not advance	
Darian Schmidt	3 m springboard	380.95	31	Did not advance			
David Boudia	10 m platform	552.80	1 Q	506.15	5 Q	560.20	2nd place, silver medalist(s)
David Dinsmore	10 m platform	462.75	11 Q	403.80	15	Did not advance	
Samuel Dorman; Kristian Ipsen	3 m synchronized springboard	404.13	7 Q	—N/a		405.99	7
David Boudia; Steele Johnson	10 m synchronized platform	451.02	2 Q	—N/a		436.35	5

Women

Athlete	Event	Preliminaries		Semifinals		Final	
Athlete	Event	Points	Rank	Points	Rank	Points	Rank
Samantha Pickens	1 m springboard	237.90	17	—N/a		Did not advance	
Abigail Johnston	3 m springboard	267.60	21	Did not advance			
Laura Ryan	3 m springboard	263.10	25	Did not advance			
Amy Cozad	10 m platform	345.00	5 Q	345.40	6 Q	361.95	6
Jessica Parratto	10 m platform	301.85	21	Did not advance			
Abigail Johnston; Laura Ryan	3 m synchronised springboard	275.40	8 Q	—N/a		292.50	9
Amy Cozad; Jessica Parratto	10 m synchronised platform	285.66	7 Q	—N/a		295.86	9

Mixed

Athlete	Event	Final	
Athlete	Event	Points	Rank
Jordan Windle; Abigail Johnston	3 m synchronized springboard	287.70	9
Mark Anderson; Samantha Bromberg	10 m synchronized platform	274.14	13
David Boudia; Jessica Parratto	Team	395.40	7

== High diving ==
A maximum of six high divers have been selected to compete for the U.S. team at the World Championships.

Athlete	Event	Points	Rank
David Colturi	Men's high diving	586.70	4
Andy Jones	Men's high diving	579.15	5
Steve Lobue	Men's high diving	570.45	7
Cesilie Carlton	Women's high diving	237.35	2nd place, silver medalist(s)
Ginger Huber	Women's high diving	213.70	6
Rachelle Simpson	Women's high diving	258.70	1st place, gold medalist(s)
Tara Hyer Tira	Women's high diving	178.75	9

== Open water swimming ==
Eight U.S. open water swimmers have been qualified based on their performances at the USA Swimming Open Water National Championships. The official roster featured Olympic silver medalist Haley Anderson for the women's events, and 2012 Olympian Alex Meyer for the men's events.

Men

Athlete	Event	Time	Rank
David Heron	5 km	55:20.7	6
David Heron	25 km	5:00:11.5	10
Alex Meyer	5 km	55:25.3	11
Alex Meyer	25 km	4:53:15.1	2nd place, silver medalist(s)
Sean Ryan	10 km	1:50:03.3	4
Jordan Wilimovsky	10 km	1:49:48.2	1st place, gold medalist(s)

Women

Athlete	Event	Time	Rank
Haley Anderson	5 km	58:48.4	1st place, gold medalist(s)
Haley Anderson	10 km	1:58:35.9	9
Emily Brunemann	25 km	5:19:51.2	8
Rebecca Mann	10 km	1:58:51.9	14
Ashley Twichell	5 km	59:10.0	6
Ashley Twichell	25 km	5:20:20.8	9

Mixed

Athlete	Event	Time	Rank
Sean Ryan; Ashley Twichell; Jordan Wilimovsky	Team	55:50.6	5

== Swimming ==
U.S. swimmers earned qualifying standards in the following events (up to a maximum of 2 swimmers in each event at the A-standard entry time, and 1 at the B-standard):

The U.S. team consists of 47 swimmers (22 men and 25 women). Twenty-eight of these swimmers have competed at the previous World Championships in Barcelona including undisputed superstars Ryan Lochte, Missy Franklin, and Katie Ledecky, and notable Olympic champions Nathan Adrian, Tyler Clary, Anthony Ervin, and Matt Grevers.

Men

Athlete	Event	Heat		Semifinal		Final	
Athlete	Event	Time	Rank	Time	Rank	Time	Rank
Nathan Adrian	50 m freestyle	21.73	2 Q	21.37 NR	1 Q	21.52	2nd place, silver medalist(s)
Nathan Adrian	100 m freestyle	48.61	=7 Q	48.36	5 Q	48.31	=7
Tyler Clary	200 m backstroke	1:56.92	6 Q	1:56.58	7 Q	1:56.26	7
Tyler Clary	200 m butterfly	1:55.86	6 Q	1:56.47	12	Did not advance	
Tyler Clary	400 m individual medley	4:12.22	4 Q	—N/a		4:11.71	4
Kevin Cordes	50 m breaststroke	26.93	4 Q	26.76 AM	3 Q	26.86	3rd place, bronze medalist(s)
Kevin Cordes	200 m breaststroke	2:09.94	7 Q	2:08.69	4 Q	2:08.05	2nd place, silver medalist(s)
Conor Dwyer	200 m freestyle	1:46.73	7 Q	1:46.64	9	Did not advance	
Conor Dwyer	200 m individual medley	1:58.63	4 Q	1:58.54	=8 Q	1:57.96	5
Anthony Ervin	50 m freestyle	22.44	15 Q	22.02	=8	Did not advance	
Jimmy Feigen	100 m freestyle	49.12	=20	Did not advance			
Nic Fink	100 m breaststroke	1:00.05	13 Q	1:00.14	12	Did not advance	
Nic Fink	200 m breaststroke	2:10.43	12 Q	2:10.04	10	Did not advance	
Matt Grevers	50 m backstroke	24.68	2 Q	24.59	2 Q	24.61	2nd place, silver medalist(s)
Matt Grevers	100 m backstroke	53.21	2 Q	52.73	3 Q	52.66	3rd place, bronze medalist(s)
Connor Jaeger	400 m freestyle	3:46.03	4 Q	—N/a		3:44.81	4
Connor Jaeger	800 m freestyle	7:44.47	1 Q	—N/a		7:44.51	4
Connor Jaeger	1500 m freestyle	14:53.34	2 Q	—N/a		14:41.20	2nd place, silver medalist(s)
Chase Kalisz	400 m individual medley	4:11.83	1 Q	—N/a		4:10.05	3rd place, bronze medalist(s)
Ryan Lochte	200 m freestyle	1:47.18	13 Q	1:45.36	1 Q	1:45.83	4
Ryan Lochte	200 m individual medley	1:57.90	1 Q	1:56.81	1 Q	1:55.81	1st place, gold medalist(s)
Michael McBroom	400 m freestyle	3:46.69	6 Q	—N/a		3:51.94	8
Michael McBroom	800 m freestyle	7:47.05	4 Q	—N/a		7:55.30	8
Michael McBroom	1500 m freestyle	14:57.07	7 Q	—N/a		15:06.81	6
Brendan McHugh	50 m breaststroke	27.62	18	Did not advance			
Cody Miller	100 m breaststroke	59.97	11 Q	59.86	9	Did not advance	
Ryan Murphy	200 m backstroke	1:56.71	3 Q	1:55.10	2 Q	1:55.00	5
Tim Phillips	50 m butterfly	23.91	23	Did not advance			
Tim Phillips	100 m butterfly	51.90	=10 Q	52.14	13	Did not advance	
David Plummer	50 m backstroke	25.79	5 Q	24.82	7 Q	24.95	8
David Plummer	100 m backstroke	54.06	16 Q	53.54	9	Did not advance	
Tom Shields	100 m butterfly	51.09	2 Q	51.03	=1 Q	51.06	4
Tom Shields	200 m butterfly	1:56.12	9 Q	1:55.75	8 Q	1:56.17	8
Jimmy Feigen; Anthony Ervin; Matt Grevers; Conor Dwyer	4 × 100 m freestyle relay	3:16.01	=11	—N/a		Did not advance	
Ryan Lochte; Conor Dwyer; Reed Malone; Michael Weiss; Michael Klueh*	4 × 200 m freestyle relay	7:08.55	2 Q	—N/a		7:04.75	2nd place, silver medalist(s)
Nathan Adrian; Kevin Cordes; Matt Grevers; Ryan Lochte; Cody Miller; Ryan Murphy; Tim Phillips; Tom Shields	4 × 100 m medley relay	3:31.06	1 Q	—N/a		3:29.93	1st place, gold medalist(s)

Women

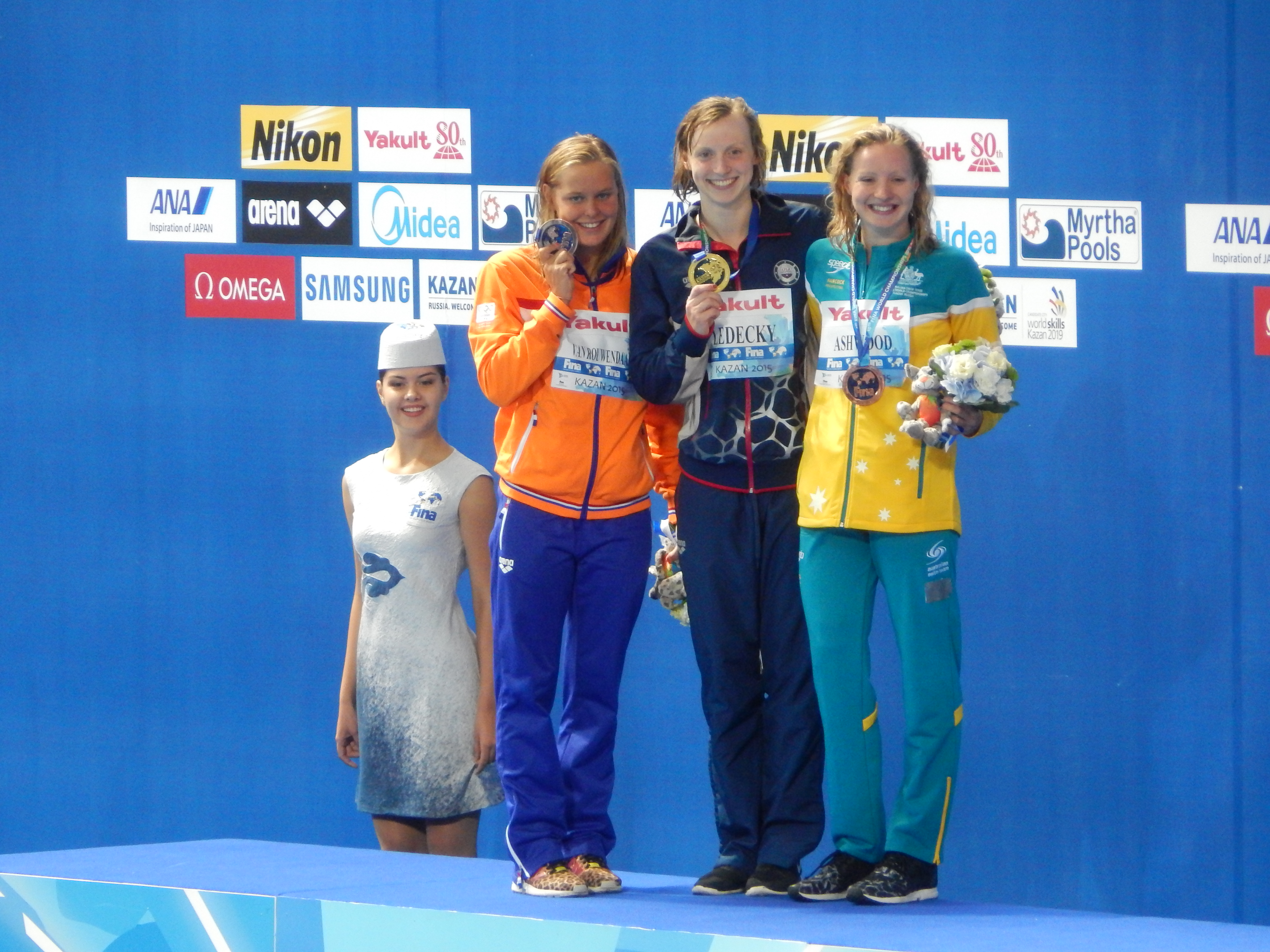
Victory Ceremony 400m freestyle

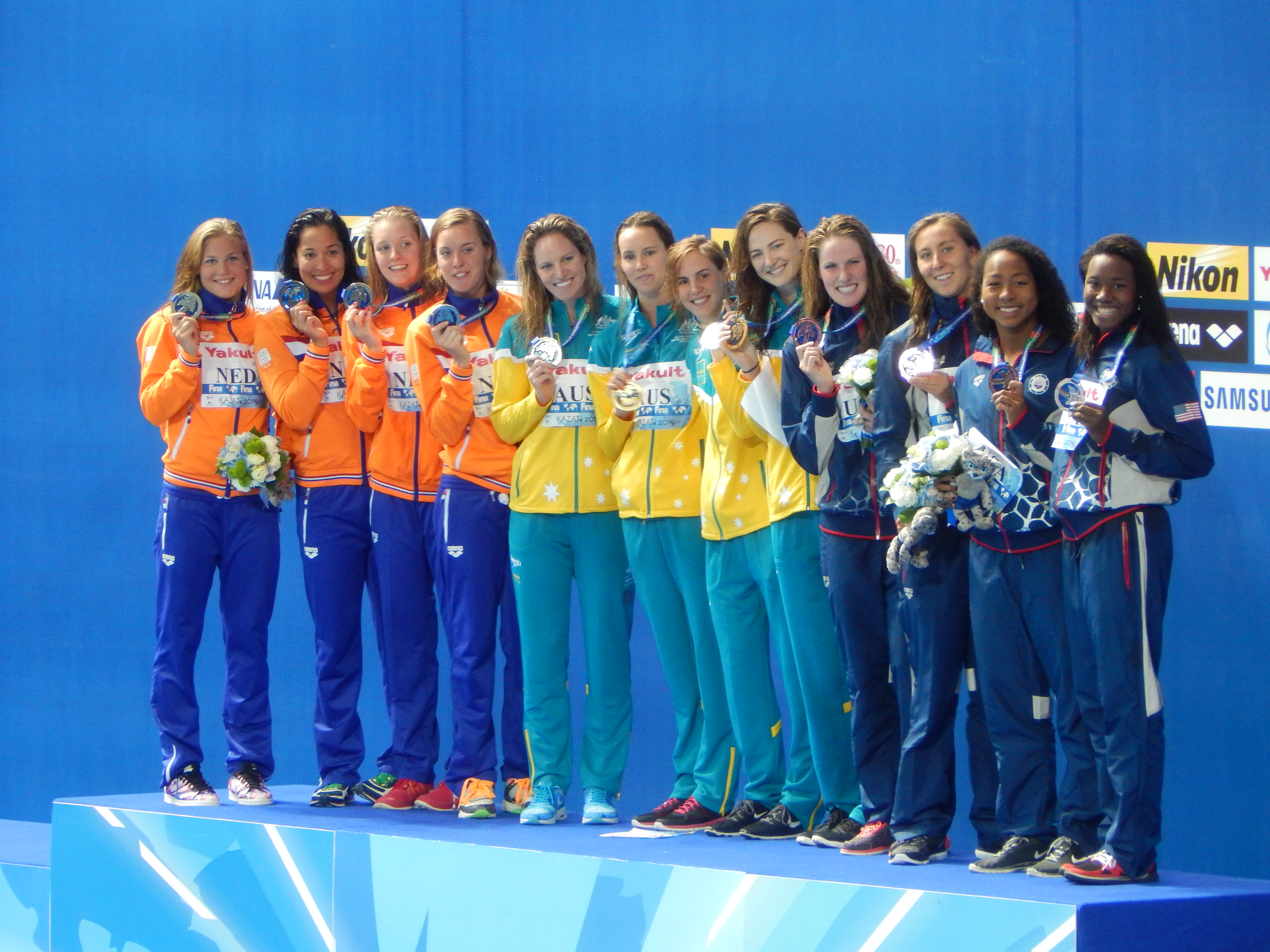
Victory Ceremony 4×100 metres freestyle relay

Athlete	Event	Heat		Semifinal		Final	
Athlete	Event	Time	Rank	Time	Rank	Time	Rank
Cammille Adams	200 m butterfly	2:07.96	4 Q	2:07.57	=6 Q	2:06.40	2nd place, silver medalist(s)
Kathleen Baker	100 m backstroke	1:00.62	17 Q	59.63	7 Q	59.99	8
Elizabeth Beisel	200 m backstroke	2:09.54	8 Q	2:10.68	13	Did not advance	
Elizabeth Beisel	400 m individual medley	4:38.96	12	—N/a		Did not advance	
Rachel Bootsma	50 m backstroke	DNS		Did not advance			
Katy Campbell	1500 m freestyle	16:39.98	18	—N/a		Did not advance	
Madeline Dirado	200 m individual medley	2:12.38	=9 Q	2:09.82	4 Q	2:08.99	4
Madeline Dirado	400 m individual medley	4:36.11	=4 Q	—N/a		4:31.71	2nd place, silver medalist(s)
Claire Donahue	50 m butterfly	26.52	17	Did not advance			
Claire Donahue	100 m butterfly	58.77	20	Did not advance			
Missy Franklin	100 m freestyle	54.22	=10 Q	53.92	8 Q	54.00	7
Missy Franklin	200 m freestyle	1:56.42	3 Q	1:56.37	2 Q	1:55.49	3rd place, bronze medalist(s)
Missy Franklin	100 m backstroke	59.59	5 Q	59.42	5 Q	59.40	5
Missy Franklin	200 m backstroke	2:07.84	2 Q	2:07.79	3 Q	2:06.34	2nd place, silver medalist(s)
Jessica Hardy	50 m breaststroke	30.44	4 Q	30.25	3 Q	30.20	5
Jessica Hardy	100 m breaststroke	1:06.68	3 Q	1:07.22	10	Did not advance	
Breeja Larson	200 m breaststroke	2:26.38	19	Did not advance			
Micah Lawrence	50 m breaststroke	31.38	19	Did not advance			
Micah Lawrence	100 m breaststroke	1:07.73	19	Did not advance			
Micah Lawrence	200 m breaststroke	2:23.32	2 Q	2:22.04	2 Q	2:22.44	2nd place, silver medalist(s)
Katie Ledecky	200 m freestyle	1:55.82	1 Q	1:56.76	6 Q	1:55.16	1st place, gold medalist(s)
Katie Ledecky	400 m freestyle	4:01.73	1 Q	—N/a		3:59.13	1st place, gold medalist(s)
Katie Ledecky	800 m freestyle	8:19.42	1 Q	—N/a		8:07.39 WR	1st place, gold medalist(s)
Katie Ledecky	1500 m freestyle	15:27.71 WR	1 Q	—N/a		15:25.48 WR	1st place, gold medalist(s)
Rebecca Mann	800 m freestyle	8:28.44	10	—N/a		Did not advance	
Simone Manuel	50 m freestyle	24.91	11 Q	24.47	6 Q	24.57	8
Simone Manuel	100 m freestyle	53.99	7 Q	53.81	6 Q	53.93	6
Melanie Margalis	200 m individual medley	2:11.88	6 Q	2:10.61	6 Q	2:10.41	7
Ivy Martin	50 m freestyle	25.49	=26	Did not advance			
Katie McLaughlin	200 m butterfly	2:07.32	2 Q	2:07.52	5 Q	2:06.95	6
Cierra Runge	400 m freestyle	4:07.97	9	—N/a		Did not advance	
Kendyl Stewart	50 m butterfly	26.07	=7 Q	25.93	9	Did not advance	
Kendyl Stewart	100 m butterfly	58.06	7 Q	58.14	10	Did not advance	
Missy Franklin; Margo Geer; Lia Neal; Simone Manuel; Shannon Vreeland*; Abbey Weitzeil*	4 × 100 m freestyle relay	3:35.52	1 Q	—N/a		3:34.61	3rd place, bronze medalist(s)
Missy Franklin; Leah Smith; Katie McLaughlin; Katie Ledecky; Cierra Runge*; Chelsea Chenault*; Shannon Vreeland*	4 × 200 m freestyle relay	7:52.61	2 Q	—N/a		7:45.37	1st place, gold medalist(s)
Kathleen Baker; Claire Donahue; Missy Franklin; Jessica Hardy; Micah Lawrence; Simone Manuel; Kendyl Stewart	4 × 100 m medley relay	3:57.12	2 Q	—N/a		3:56.76	4

Mixed

Athlete	Event	Heat		Final	
Athlete	Event	Time	Rank	Time	Rank
Ryan Lochte; Nathan Adrian; Simone Manuel; Missy Franklin; Conor Dwyer*; Margo Geer*; Abbey Weitzeil*	4 × 100 m freestyle relay	3:24.51	1 Q	3:23.05 WR	1st place, gold medalist(s)
Kevin Cordes; Ryan Murphy; Margo Geer; Katie McLaughlin; Lia Neal*; Kendyl Stewart*	4 × 100 m medley relay	3:42.33 WR	1 Q	3:43.27	2nd place, silver medalist(s)

== Synchronized swimming ==
Fourteen U.S. synchronized swimmers (one male and thirteen female) have been selected to compete in each of the following events at the World Championships.

Women

Athlete	Event	Preliminaries		Final	
Athlete	Event	Points	Rank	Points	Rank
Mary Killman	Solo technical routine	82.9311	10 Q	84.5857	9
Mary Killman	Solo free routine	86.8000	8 Q	86.6000	9
Anita Alvarez; Mariya Koroleva	Duet technical routine	83.0493	11 Q	83.5089	12
Anita Alvarez; Mariya Koroleva	Duet free routine	84.4333	11 Q	84.9667	11
Anita Alvarez; Claire Barton; Phoebe Coffin; Olivia Ekberg*; Mary Killman; Mariya Koroleva; Sandra Ortellado; Sarah Rodriguez; Karensa Tjoa; Alison Williams	Team technical routine	84.3882	10 Q	83.4289	10
Anita Alvarez; Claire Barton; Phoebe Coffin; Olivia Ekberg*; Mary Killman; Mariya Koroleva; Isabel Malcolmson; Sandra Ortellado; Karensa Tjoa; Alison Williams	Team free routine	84.6333	12 Q	84.5667	12

Mixed

Athlete	Event	Preliminaries		Final	
Athlete	Event	Points	Rank	Points	Rank
Bill May; Christina Jones	Duet technical routine	86.7108	2 Q	88.5108	1st place, gold medalist(s)
Bill May; Kristina Lum	Duet free routine	90.5000	1 Q	91.4667	2nd place, silver medalist(s)

== Water polo ==
=== Men's tournament ===
Team roster

- Merrill Moses
- Nikola Vavić
- Alex Obert
- Jackson Kimbell
- Alex Roelse
- Luca Cupido
- Josh Samuels
- Tony Azevedo
- Alex Bowen
- Bret Bonanni
- Jesse Smith
- John Mann
- McQuin Baron

Group play

Pos	Team	Pld	W	D	L	GF	GA	GD	Pts	Qualification
1	Greece	3	3	0	0	37	31	+6	6	Advanced to quarterfinals
2	United States	3	2	0	1	28	26	+2	4	Advanced to playoffs
3	Italy	3	1	0	2	28	28	0	2	Advanced to playoffs
4	Russia	3	0	0	3	23	31	−8	0	

Source: SportResult.com
Rules for classification: 1) points; 2) head-to-head points; 3) head-to-head goal difference; 4) head-to-head number of goals scored; 5) goal difference.

27 July 2015; 18:50	Report	United States	7–6	Russia	Kazan; Attendance: 1,932; Referees: Boris Margeta (SLO), Daniel Flahive (AUS)
27 July 2015; 18:50	Report	Score by quarters: 3–1, 1–2, 2–2, 1–1			Kazan; Attendance: 1,932; Referees: Boris Margeta (SLO), Daniel Flahive (AUS)
27 July 2015; 18:50	Report	Azevedo, Cupido 3	Goals	Bugaychuk 3	Kazan; Attendance: 1,932; Referees: Boris Margeta (SLO), Daniel Flahive (AUS)

29 July 2015; 09:30	Report	Greece	11–10	United States	Kazan; Attendance: 839; Referees: Francesc Buch (ESP), Vojin Putniković (SRB)
29 July 2015; 09:30	Report	Score by quarters: 3–3, 1–3, 4–3, 3–1			Kazan; Attendance: 839; Referees: Francesc Buch (ESP), Vojin Putniković (SRB)
29 July 2015; 09:30	Report	Fountoulis 4	Goals	three players 2	Kazan; Attendance: 839; Referees: Francesc Buch (ESP), Vojin Putniković (SRB)

31 July 2015; 21:30	Report	United States	11–9	Italy	Kazan; Attendance: 214; Referees: Boris Margeta (SLO), Nenad Peris (CRO)
31 July 2015; 21:30	Report	Score by quarters: 4–4, 3–2, 2–1, 2–2			Kazan; Attendance: 214; Referees: Boris Margeta (SLO), Nenad Peris (CRO)
31 July 2015; 21:30	Report	Vavić 3	Goals	Di Fulvio 4	Kazan; Attendance: 214; Referees: Boris Margeta (SLO), Nenad Peris (CRO)

Playoffs

2 August 2015; 17:30	Report	Brazil	3–7	United States	Kazan; Attendance: 2,090; Referees: Boris Margeta (SLO), Adrian Alexandrescu (ROU)
2 August 2015; 17:30	Report	Score by quarters: 0–2, 1–1, 1–1, 1–3			Kazan; Attendance: 2,090; Referees: Boris Margeta (SLO), Adrian Alexandrescu (ROU)
2 August 2015; 17:30	Report	three players 1	Goals	Mann 3	Kazan; Attendance: 2,090; Referees: Boris Margeta (SLO), Adrian Alexandrescu (ROU)

Quarterfinals

4 August 2015; 21:30	Report	Serbia	12–7	United States	Kazan; Attendance: 455; Referees: Francesc Buch (ESP), Nenad Peris (CRO)
4 August 2015; 21:30	Report	Score by quarters: 4–2, 3–3, 2–1, 3–1			Kazan; Attendance: 455; Referees: Francesc Buch (ESP), Nenad Peris (CRO)
4 August 2015; 21:30	Report	Pijetlović 4	Goals	Bonanni 2	Kazan; Attendance: 455; Referees: Francesc Buch (ESP), Nenad Peris (CRO)

5th–8th place semifinals

6 August 2015; 17:00	Report	Hungary	13–9	United States	Kazan; Attendance: 645; Referees: Massimiliano Caputi (ITA), Sergey Naumov (RUS)
6 August 2015; 17:00	Report	Score by quarters: 4–2, 3–2, 2–2, 4–3			Kazan; Attendance: 645; Referees: Massimiliano Caputi (ITA), Sergey Naumov (RUS)
6 August 2015; 17:00	Report	Hárai 4	Goals	Azevedo, Bonanni 3	Kazan; Attendance: 645; Referees: Massimiliano Caputi (ITA), Sergey Naumov (RUS)

Seventh place game

8 August 2015; 14:00	Report	Australia	6–10	United States	Kazan; Attendance: 1,677; Referees: Nenad Peris (CRO), Francesc Buch (ESP)
8 August 2015; 14:00	Report	Score by quarters: 3–2, 0–2, 1–4, 2–2			Kazan; Attendance: 1,677; Referees: Nenad Peris (CRO), Francesc Buch (ESP)
8 August 2015; 14:00	Report	Younger 2	Goals	Azevedo 4	Kazan; Attendance: 1,677; Referees: Nenad Peris (CRO), Francesc Buch (ESP)

=== Women's tournament ===
Team roster

- Samantha Hill
- Madeline Musselmann
- Melissa Seidemann
- Rachel Fattal
- Alys Williams
- Margaret Steffens
- Courtney Mathewson
- Kiley Neushul
- Ashley Grossman
- Kaleigh Gilchrist
- Makenzie Fischer
- Kami Craig
- Ashleigh Johnson

Group play

Pos	Team	Pld	W	D	L	GF	GA	GD	Pts	Qualification
1	Italy	3	3	0	0	40	18	+22	6	Advanced to quarterfinals
2	United States	3	2	0	1	39	14	+25	4	Advanced to playoffs
3	Brazil	3	1	0	2	19	36	−17	2	Advanced to playoffs
4	Japan	3	0	0	3	13	43	−30	0	

Source: SportResult.com
Rules for classification: 1) points; 2) head-to-head points; 3) head-to-head goal difference; 4) head-to-head number of goals scored; 5) goal difference.

26 July 2015; 17:30	Report	Brazil	2–13	United States	Kazan; Attendance: 1,880; Referees: Dion Willis (RSA), Viktor Salnichenko (KAZ)
26 July 2015; 17:30	Report	Score by quarters: 0–6, 0–3, 1–2, 1–2			Kazan; Attendance: 1,880; Referees: Dion Willis (RSA), Viktor Salnichenko (KAZ)
26 July 2015; 17:30	Report	Chiappini, Oliveira 1	Goals	Steffens 3	Kazan; Attendance: 1,880; Referees: Dion Willis (RSA), Viktor Salnichenko (KAZ)

28 July 2015; 12:10	Report	Italy	10–9	United States	Kazan; Attendance: 529; Referees: Georgios Stavridis (GRE), Cory Williams (NZL)
28 July 2015; 12:10	Report	Score by quarters: 4–2, 2–1, 2–4, 2–2			Kazan; Attendance: 529; Referees: Georgios Stavridis (GRE), Cory Williams (NZL)
28 July 2015; 12:10	Report	Bianconi 4	Goals	Fattal 5	Kazan; Attendance: 529; Referees: Georgios Stavridis (GRE), Cory Williams (NZL)

30 July 2015; 10:50	Report	Japan	2–17	United States	Kazan; Attendance: 729; Referees: Dion Willis (RSA), Vojin Putniković (SRB)
30 July 2015; 10:50	Report	Score by quarters: 0–4, 0–4, 1–6, 1–3			Kazan; Attendance: 729; Referees: Dion Willis (RSA), Vojin Putniković (SRB)
30 July 2015; 10:50	Report	Nakano 2	Goals	Steffens 4	Kazan; Attendance: 729; Referees: Dion Willis (RSA), Vojin Putniković (SRB)

Playoffs

1 August 2015; 18:50	Report	United States	12–7	Hungary	Kazan; Attendance: 780; Referees: Ursula Wengenroth (SUI), Daniel Flahive (AUS)
1 August 2015; 18:50	Report	Score by quarters: 3–1, 4–1, 4–1, 1–4			Kazan; Attendance: 780; Referees: Ursula Wengenroth (SUI), Daniel Flahive (AUS)
1 August 2015; 18:50	Report	Fattal 4	Goals	Keszthelyi 3	Kazan; Attendance: 780; Referees: Ursula Wengenroth (SUI), Daniel Flahive (AUS)

Quarterfinals

3 August 2015; 17:30	Report	Spain	5–8	United States	Kazan; Attendance: 1,460; Referees: Massimiliano Caputi (ITA), Georgios Stavridis (GRE)
3 August 2015; 17:30	Report	Score by quarters: 0–2, 2–3, 2–1, 1–2			Kazan; Attendance: 1,460; Referees: Massimiliano Caputi (ITA), Georgios Stavridis (GRE)
3 August 2015; 17:30	Report	Espar 2	Goals	Fattal, Neushul 2	Kazan; Attendance: 1,460; Referees: Massimiliano Caputi (ITA), Georgios Stavridis (GRE)

Semifinals

5 August 2015; 20:30	Report	United States	8–6	Australia	Kazan; Attendance: 1,007; Referees: Boris Margeta (SLO), Georgios Stavridis (GRE)
5 August 2015; 20:30	Report	Score by quarters: 2–2, 3–3, 1–0, 2–1			Kazan; Attendance: 1,007; Referees: Boris Margeta (SLO), Georgios Stavridis (GRE)
5 August 2015; 20:30	Report	Fattal, Steffens 2	Goals	six players 1	Kazan; Attendance: 1,007; Referees: Boris Margeta (SLO), Georgios Stavridis (GRE)

Final

7 August 2015; 22:00	Report	United States	5–4	Netherlands	Kazan; Attendance: 2,305; Referees: Sergey Naumov (RUS), Massimiliano Caputi (ITA)
7 August 2015; 22:00	Report	Score by quarters: 0–1, 2–1, 3–1, 0–1			Kazan; Attendance: 2,305; Referees: Sergey Naumov (RUS), Massimiliano Caputi (ITA)
7 August 2015; 22:00	Report	Fattal 2	Goals	Megens 2	Kazan; Attendance: 2,305; Referees: Sergey Naumov (RUS), Massimiliano Caputi (ITA)
