= Diving at the 2015 World Aquatics Championships – Mixed synchronized 10 metre platform =

Mixed synchronized 10 metre platform at the 2015 World Aquatics Championships
- Dates: 25 July
- Competitors: 30 from 15 nations
- Winning points: 350.88

Medalists
gold medal	Si Yajie; Tai Xiaohu	China
silver medal	Meaghan Benfeito; Vincent Riendeau	Canada
bronze medal	Domonic Bedggood; Melissa Wu	Australia

The Mixed synchronized 10 metre platform competition of the diving events at the 2015 World Aquatics Championships was held on 25 July 2015.

== Results ==
The final was started at 15:00.

Rank	Nation	Divers	Points
1st place, gold medalist(s)	China	Si Yajie; Tai Xiaohu	350.88
2nd place, silver medalist(s)	Canada	Meaghan Benfeito; Vincent Riendeau	309.66
3rd place, bronze medalist(s)	Australia	Domonic Bedggood; Melissa Wu	308.22
4	North Korea	Hyon Il-myong; Kim Kuk-hyang	305.52
5	Russia	Nikita Shleikher; Yulia Timoshinina	304.14
6	Italy	Noemi Batki; Maicol Verzotto	299.28
7	France	Benjamin Auffret; Laura Marino	295.35
8	Mexico	Paola Espinosa; Jahir Ocampo	294.24
9	Japan	Minami Itahashi; Yu Okamoto	289.92
10	Malaysia	Loh Loh Zhiayi; Chew Yiwei	289.89
11	Romania	Mara Aiacoboae; Cătălin Cozma	286.92
12	Brazil	Ingrid Oliveira; Luiz Outerelo	283.68
13	United States	Mark Anderson; Samantha Bromberg	274.14
14	Germany	Dominic Stein; My Phan	260.46
15	Egypt	Maha Abdelsalam; Mohab Elkordy	207.63
