= Swimming at the 2015 World Aquatics Championships – Men's 100 metre backstroke =

Men's 100 metre backstroke at the 2015 World Aquatics Championships
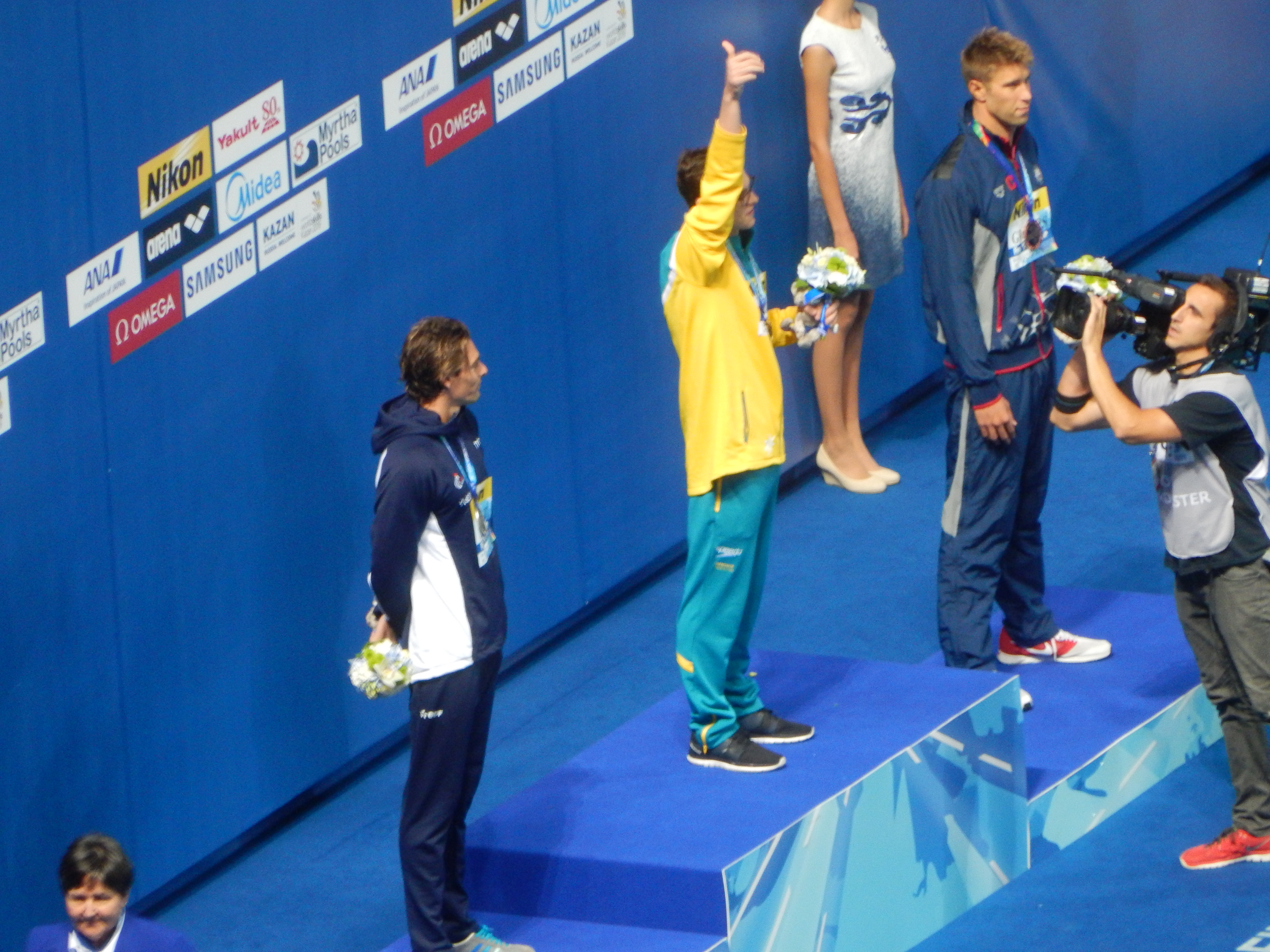
- Victory Ceremony
- Dates: 3 August (heats and semifinals); 4 August (final)
- Competitors: 68 from 58 nations
- Winning time: 52.40

Medalists
gold medal	Mitch Larkin	Australia
silver medal	Camille Lacourt	France
bronze medal	Matt Grevers	United States

The Men's 100 metre backstroke competition of the swimming events at the 2015 World Aquatics Championships was held on 3 August with the heats and the semifinals and 4 August with the final.

== Records ==
Prior to the competition, the existing world and championship records were as follows.

World record	Aaron Peirsol (USA)	51.94	Indianapolis, United States	8 July 2009
Competition record	Aaron Peirsol (USA)	52.19	Rome, Italy	2 August 2009

== Results ==
=== Heats ===
The heats were held on 3 August at 09:49.

Rank	Heat	Lane	Name	Nationality	Time	Notes
1	6	5	Mitch Larkin	Australia	52.50	Q, OC
2	7	4	Matt Grevers	United States	53.21	Q
3	6	4	Xu Jiayu	China	53.29	Q
4	6	6	Liam Tancock	Great Britain	53.35	Q
5	7	5	Ryosuke Irie	Japan	53.37	Q
6	6	3	Guilherme Guido	Brazil	53.57	Q
7	5	4	Chris Walker-Hebborn	Great Britain	53.64	Q
8	5	2	Grigory Tarasevich	Russia	53.69	Q
9	7	3	Evgeny Rylov	Russia	53.74	Q
10	6	1	Jan-Philip Glania	Germany	53.78	Q
11	7	6	Simone Sabbioni	Italy	53.83	Q
12	5	3	Jérémy Stravius	France	53.92	Q
12	6	2	Camille Lacourt	France	53.92	Q
12	7	7	Yakov Toumarkin	Israel	53.92	Q
15	5	6	Ben Treffers	Australia	54.00	Q
16	5	5	David Plummer	United States	54.06	Q
17	7	2	Masaki Kaneko	Japan	54.19	
18	5	1	Radosław Kawęcki	Poland	54.20	
19	6	8	Tomasz Polewka	Poland	54.26	
20	5	9	Li Guangyuan	China	54.34	
21	7	9	Quah Zheng Wen	Singapore	54.40	NR
22	7	0	Corey Main	New Zealand	54.51	
23	4	4	Gábor Balog	Hungary	54.65	
24	7	8	Christian Diener	Germany	54.75	
25	6	0	Park Seon-kwan	South Korea	54.80	
26	6	7	Christopher Ciccarese	Italy	54.81	
26	6	9	Juan Miguel Rando	Spain	54.81	
28	5	0	Danas Rapšys	Lithuania	54.86	
29	5	7	Russell Wood	Canada	54.90	
30	4	3	Robert Glință	Romania	55.07	
31	7	1	Apostolos Christou	Greece	55.10	
32	4	1	Ralf Tribuntsov	Estonia	55.13	NR
33	4	0	Dylan Carter	Trinidad and Tobago	55.24	
34	4	5	Lavrans Solli	Norway	55.28	
35	5	8	Pavel Sankovich	Belarus	55.79	
36	3	3	Mohamed Hussein	Egypt	55.85	
37	3	8	Rexford Tullius	Virgin Islands	55.88	
38	4	7	Omar Pinzón	Colombia	55.90	
39	3	4	Lukas Rauftlin	Switzerland	56.11	
40	4	6	Janis Šaltans	Latvia	56.15	
41	3	6	Ryan Pini	Papua New Guinea	56.39	
41	4	9	I Gede Siman Sudartawa	Indonesia	56.39	
43	3	5	Doruk Tekin	Turkey	56.57	
44	4	8	Lê Nguyễn Paul	Vietnam	56.95	
45	3	7	Petar Petrović	Serbia	57.44	
46	2	6	Timothy Wynter	Jamaica	57.47	
47	2	2	Boris Kirillov	Azerbaijan	57.50	
48	3	9	Martin Zhelev	Bulgaria	57.55	
49	2	3	Merdan Ataýew	Turkmenistan	57.57	
50	3	0	Charles Hockin	Paraguay	57.84	
51	2	1	David van der Colff	Botswana	57.95	
52	3	1	Jamal Chavoshifar	Iran	58.75	
53	1	5	Eisner Barbarena	Nicaragua	58.95	
54	2	5	Ngou Pok Man	Macau	59.12	
55	2	0	Jean Gómez	Dominican Republic	59.69	
56	2	9	Lushano Lamprecht	Namibia	59.77	
57	1	4	Hamdan Bayusuf	Kenya	1:00.07	
58	2	8	Driss Lahrichi	Morocco	1:00.42	
59	1	3	Adel Elfakir	Libya	1:00.84	
60	2	7	Yaaqoub Al-Saadi	United Arab Emirates	1:01.04	
61	1	2	Mohammed Bedour	Jordan	1:02.33	
62	1	7	Mohammad Ahmed	Bangladesh	1:04.28	
63	1	1	Farhan Saleh	Bahrain	1:04.94	
64	1	8	Noah Al-Khulaifi	Qatar	1:05.36	
65	1	6	Arnold Kisulo	Uganda	1:06.14	
66	1	0	Temaruata Strickland	Cook Islands	1:10.89	
67	1	9	Htut Ahnt Khaung	Myanmar	1:12.90	
	2	4	Daniel Ramírez	Mexico	DNS	
	4	2	Albert Subirats	Venezuela	DNS	
	3	2	Armando Barrera	Cuba	DSQ	

=== Semifinals ===
The semifinals were held on 3 August at 17:48.

==== Semifinal 1 ====
Rank	Lane	Name	Nationality	Time	Notes
1	4	Matt Grevers	United States	52.73	Q
2	5	Liam Tancock	Great Britain	53.19	Q
3	8	David Plummer	United States	53.54	
4	6	Grigory Tarasevich	Russia	53.64	
5	1	Yakov Toumarkin	Israel	53.77	
6	2	Jan-Philip Glania	Germany	53.78	
7	3	Guilherme Guido	Brazil	53.88	
8	7	Jérémy Stravius	France	54.54	

==== Semifinal 2 ====
Rank	Lane	Name	Nationality	Time	Notes
1	4	Mitch Larkin	Australia	52.38	Q, OC
2	1	Camille Lacourt	France	52.70	Q
3	3	Ryosuke Irie	Japan	53.13	Q
4	2	Evgeny Rylov	Russia	53.14	Q
5	5	Xu Jiayu	China	53.15	Q
6	6	Chris Walker-Hebborn	Great Britain	53.39	Q
7	7	Simone Sabbioni	Italy	53.60	
	8	Ben Treffers	Australia	DSQ	

=== Final ===
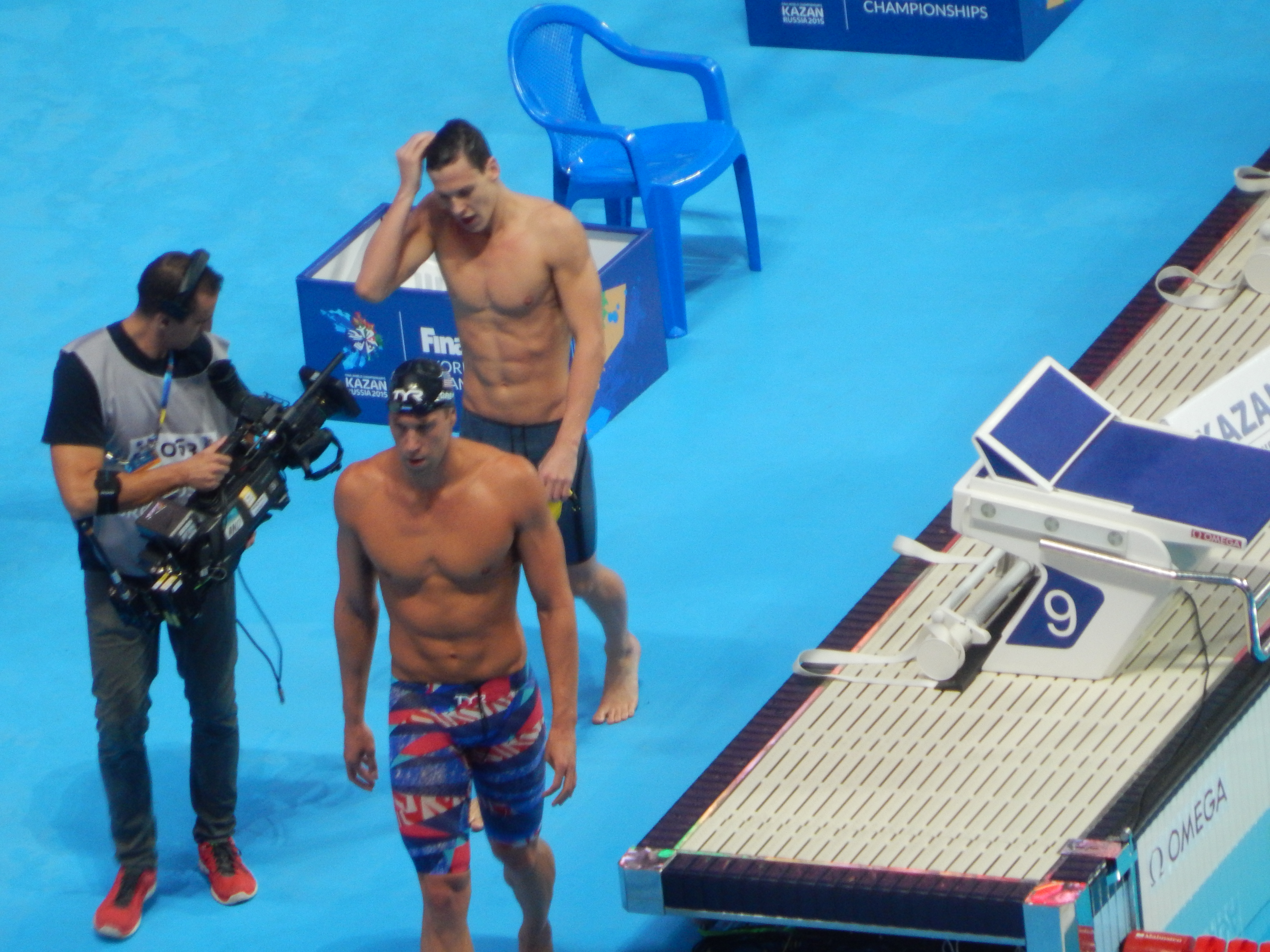
Larkin and Grevers after finishing the final heat

The final was held on 4 August at 18:36.

Rank	Lane	Name	Nationality	Time	Notes
1st place, gold medalist(s)	4	Mitch Larkin	Australia	52.40	
2nd place, silver medalist(s)	5	Camille Lacourt	France	52.48	
3rd place, bronze medalist(s)	3	Matt Grevers	United States	52.66	
4	7	Xu Jiayu	China	52.89	
5	8	Chris Walker-Hebborn	Great Britain	53.02	
6	6	Ryosuke Irie	Japan	53.10	
7	2	Evgeny Rylov	Russia	53.23	
8	1	Liam Tancock	Great Britain	53.37	
