= Swimming at the 2015 World Aquatics Championships – Men's 200 metre individual medley =

Men's 200 metre individual medley at the 2015 World Aquatics Championships
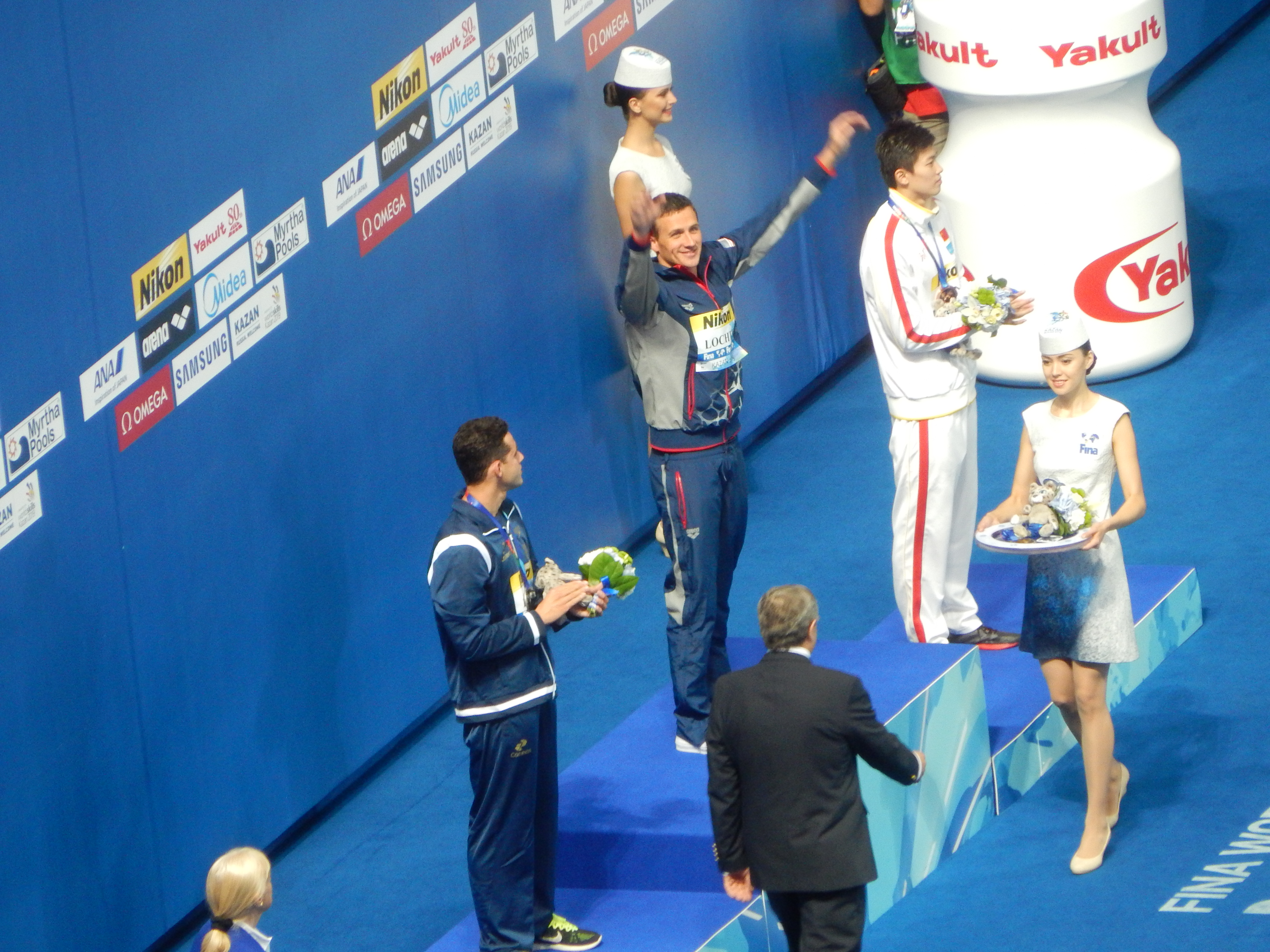
- Victory Ceremony
- Dates: 5 August (heats and semifinals); 6 August (final)
- Competitors: 47 from 43 nations
- Winning time: 1:55.81

Medalists
gold medal	Ryan Lochte	United States
silver medal	Thiago Pereira	Brazil
bronze medal	Wang Shun	China

The Men's 200 metre individual medley competition of the swimming events at the 2015 World Aquatics Championships was held on 5 August with the heats and the semifinals and 6 August with the final.

== Records ==
Prior to the competition, the existing world and championship records were as follows.

World record	Ryan Lochte (USA)	1:54.00	Shanghai, China	28 July 2011
Competition record	Ryan Lochte (USA)	1:54.00	Shanghai, China	28 July 2011

== Results ==
=== Heats ===
The heats were held at 10:30.

Rank	Heat	Lane	Name	Nationality	Time	Notes
1	5	4	Ryan Lochte	United States	1:57.90	Q
2	5	6	Daniel Wallace	Great Britain	1:58.28	Q
3	3	3	Wang Shun	China	1:58.33	Q
4	5	5	Conor Dwyer	United States	1:58.63	Q
5	3	2	Andreas Vazaios	Greece	1:58.92	Q, NR
6	3	4	Henrique Rodrigues	Brazil	1:58.95	Q
7	4	4	Daiya Seto	Japan	1:59.11	Q
8	4	5	Thiago Pereira	Brazil	1:59.18	Q
9	3	5	Roberto Pavoni	Great Britain	1:59.29	Q
10	5	8	Jérémy Desplanches	Switzerland	1:59.46	Q, NR
11	4	7	Diogo Carvalho	Portugal	1:59.61	Q
12	4	6	Simon Sjödin	Sweden	1:59.64	Q
13	5	3	Thomas Fraser-Holmes	Australia	1:59.96	Q
14	5	2	Yakov Toumarkin	Israel	1:59.97	Q
15	3	6	Marcin Cieślak	Poland	1:59.99	Q
16	2	7	Mohamed Hussein	Egypt	2:00.22	Q, NR
17	4	8	Uvis Kalniņš	Latvia	2:00.39	NR
18	4	2	Yang Zhixian	China	2:00.80	
19	5	7	Federico Turrini	Italy	2:00.94	
20	3	1	Semen Makovich	Russia	2:01.05	
21	3	8	Jakub Maly	Austria	2:01.68	
22	5	0	Pavel Janeček	Czech Republic	2:02.43	NR
23	3	7	Raphaël Stacchiotti	Luxembourg	2:02.60	
24	4	0	Omar Pinzón	Colombia	2:02.80	
25	5	1	Bradlee Ashby	New Zealand	2:02.96	
26	3	9	Martin Liivamägi	Estonia	2:03.21	
27	2	3	Carlos Omaña	Venezuela	2:03.54	
28	5	9	Povilas Strazdas	Lithuania	2:03.67	
29	2	9	Alpkan Örnek	Turkey	2:03.93	
30	2	8	Christoph Meier	Liechtenstein	2:04.01	
31	2	0	Trần Duy Khôi	Vietnam	2:04.30	
32	1	4	Mateo González	Mexico	2:04.77	
33	2	2	Marko Blaževski	North Macedonia	2:04.79	
34	1	5	Pedro Pinotes	Angola	2:04.85	
35	2	5	Aleksey Derlyugov	Uzbekistan	2:04.98	
36	2	6	Ensar Hajder	Bosnia and Herzegovina	2:04.99	
37	2	1	Ahmed Mathlouthi	Tunisia	2:05.37	
38	4	9	Rafael Alfaro	El Salvador	2:05.78	
39	1	6	Irakli Bolkvadze	Georgia	2:07.14	
40	3	0	Jessie Lacuna	Philippines	2:07.51	
41	1	7	Esteban Araya	Costa Rica	2:08.89	
42	1	8	Alvi Hjelm	Faroe Islands	2:08.98	
43	1	1	Benjamin Schulte	Guam	2:09.50	
44	1	2	Luis Vega Torres	Cuba	2:09.53	
45	1	3	Jean Gómez	Dominican Republic	2:09.59	
46	1	0	Rami Elias	Sudan	2:20.94	
47	1	9	Haris Bandey	Pakistan	2:22.31	
	2	4	Triady Fauzi Sidiq	Indonesia	DNS	
	4	1	Kevin Wedel	Germany	DNS	
	4	3	László Cseh	Hungary	DNS	

=== Semifinals ===
The semifinals were held at 18:45.

==== Semifinal 1 ====
Rank	Lane	Name	Nationality	Time	Notes
1	6	Thiago Pereira	Brazil	1:57.33	Q
2	4	Daniel Wallace	Great Britain	1:57.77	Q
3	7	Simon Sjödin	Sweden	1:58.10	Q
4	3	Henrique Rodrigues	Brazil	1:58.45	Q
5	5	Conor Dwyer	United States	1:58.54	QSO
6	1	Yakov Toumarkin	Israel	1:58.86	
7	2	Jérémy Desplanches	Switzerland	1:59.35	NR
8	8	Mohamed Hussein	Egypt	2:01.41	

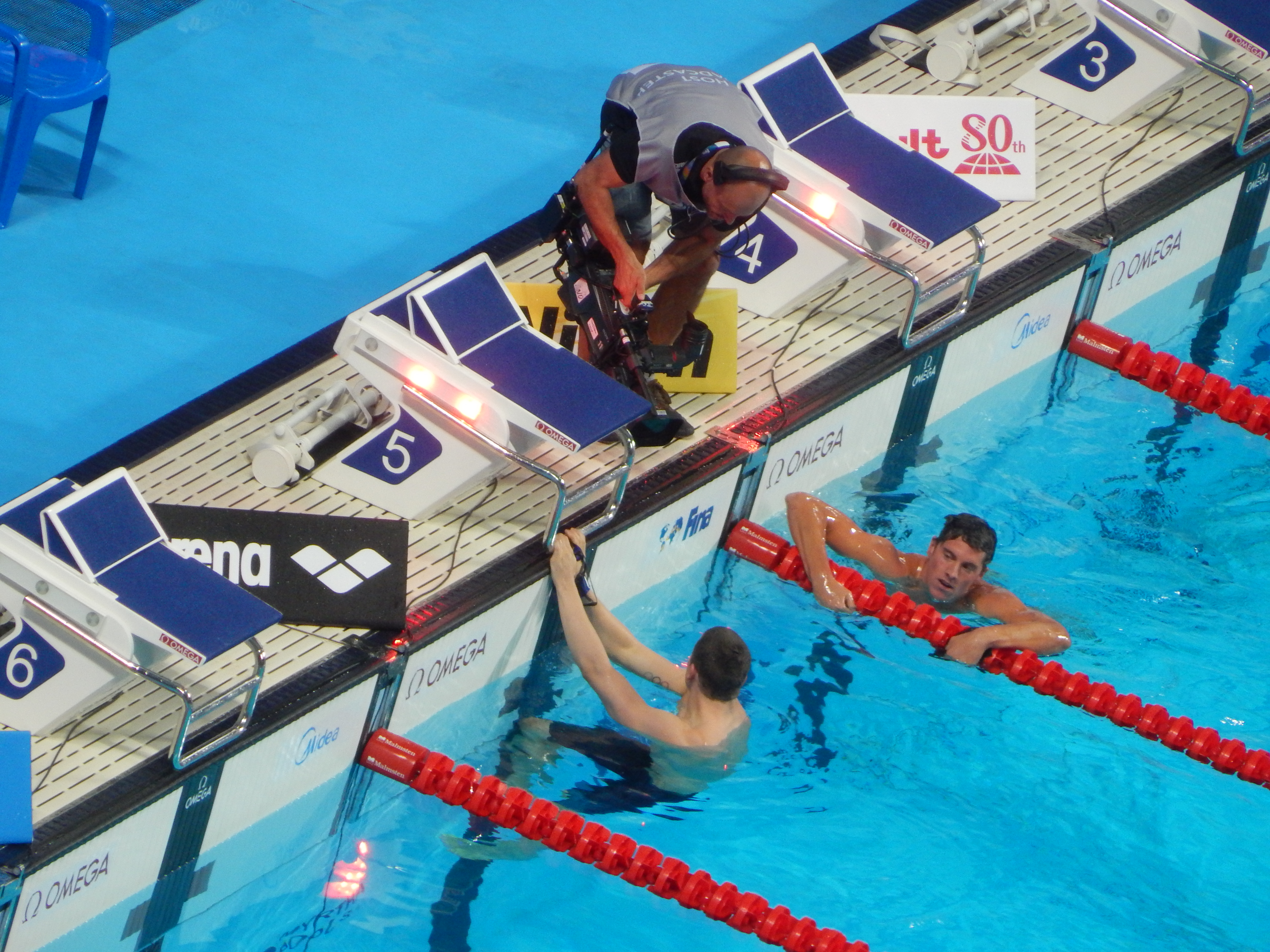
Swim-off finish

==== Semifinal 2 ====
Rank	Lane	Name	Nationality	Time	Notes
1	4	Ryan Lochte	United States	1:56.81	Q
2	5	Wang Shun	China	1:57.07	Q
3	8	Marcin Cieślak	Poland	1:58.20	Q, NR
4	2	Roberto Pavoni	Great Britain	1:58.54	QSO
5	1	Thomas Fraser-Holmes	Australia	1:58.83	
6	3	Andreas Vazaios	Greece	1:59.53	
7	6	Daiya Seto	Japan	2:00.05	
8	7	Diogo Carvalho	Portugal	2:00.31	

==== Swim-off ====
The swim-off was held at 19:42.

Rank	Lane	Name	Nationality	Time	Notes
1	4	Conor Dwyer	United States	1:58.18	Q
2	5	Roberto Pavoni	Great Britain	1:58.26	

=== Final ===
The final was held at 17:42.

Rank	Lane	Name	Nationality	Time	Notes
1st place, gold medalist(s)	4	Ryan Lochte	United States	1:55.81	
2nd place, silver medalist(s)	3	Thiago Pereira	Brazil	1:56.65	
3rd place, bronze medalist(s)	5	Wang Shun	China	1:56.81	NR
4	6	Daniel Wallace	Great Britain	1:57.59	
5	8	Conor Dwyer	United States	1:57.96	
6	7	Marcin Cieślak	Poland	1:58.14	NR
7	1	Henrique Rodrigues	Brazil	1:58.52	
8	2	Simon Sjödin	Sweden	1:59.06	
