= Great Britain at the 2015 World Aquatics Championships =

- Flag of Great Britain
- World Aquatics code: GBR
- National federation: British Swimming
- Website: www.swimming.org/britishswimming

in Kazan, Russia
- Competitors: 50 in 5 sports
- Medals Ranked 5th: Gold 7 Silver 1 Bronze 6 Total 14

World Aquatics Championships appearances
- 1973; 1975; 1978; 1982; 1986; 1991; 1994; 1998; 2001; 2003; 2005; 2007; 2009; 2011; 2013; 2015; 2017; 2019; 2022; 2023; 2024; 2025

Great Britain competed at the 2015 World Aquatics Championships in Kazan, Russia between 24 July to 9 August 2015.

Tom Daley and Rebecca Gallantree became the first ever winners of the Mixed team event. In doing so, Daley became the first British diver to win multiple medals across World Championships, and the first British double world champion. Gallantree became the first female British diver to win a World Championship medal of any colour, and the first female British World Champion. With bronze in the Men's 10 m platform, Daley would go on to become the first British diver to win three World Championship medals.

Jack Laugher, with his bronze medal in both the Men's 3 m springboard event, and Men's 3 m synchronized springboard with Chris Mears, became the first British diver to win two World championship medals at one edition, later equalled by Daley. With a gold and three bronze medals, the 2015 edition was by some margin the most successful World Championships in diving for Great Britain since the championships began.

With Great Britain's first gold medal in Men's high diving, Gary Hunt brought the Great Britain overall tally to ten medals, the highest ever for the nation at a FINA World Aquatics Championships. Simultaneously, with his silver medal from 2013, Hunt became the most successful male high diver since the event was brought into the World Aquatics Championships.

Adam Peaty became the first British swimmer to ever win three gold medals at a global championships, Worlds or Olympic, with victories in the 50 metre and 100 metre breaststroke events and the 4 x 100 metre mixed medley relay. James Guy won the first ever gold medal in male freestyle for Great Britain at a World Championships in the 200 metres freestyle, and then anchored the Great Britain Men's 4 × 200 m freestyle relay team to its first ever victory in the event.

The bronze medal won by Jaz Carlin in the Women's 800 m freestyle brought the tally of swimming medals to five golds, a silver and three bronzes, at nine medals, the best return for Great Britain in the swimming portion of a World Aquatics Championships, having already achieved the best results in their history in diving and high diving. The full tally of seven golds, one silver and six bronze was also an historic high for the championships as a whole.

== Medalists ==
Medal	Name	Sport	Event	Date
Gold	Tom Daley; Rebecca Gallantree	Diving	Mixed team	July 29
Gold	Adam Peaty	Swimming	Men's 100 m breaststroke	August 3
Gold	James Guy	Swimming	Men's 200 m freestyle	August 4
Gold	Gary Hunt	High diving	Men's high diving	August 5
Gold	Adam Peaty	Swimming	Men's 50 m breaststroke	August 5
Gold	Fran Halsall; Rachael Kelly*; Ross Murdoch*; Siobhan-Marie O'Connor; Adam Peaty; Chris Walker-Hebborn	Swimming	Mixed 4 × 100 m medley relay	August 5
Gold	Nicholas Grainger*; James Guy; Calum Jarvis; Robbie Renwick; Duncan Scott*; Daniel Wallace	Swimming	Men's 4 × 200 m freestyle relay	August 7
Silver	James Guy	Swimming	Men's 400 m freestyle	August 2
Bronze	Jack Laugher; Chris Mears	Diving	Men's 3 m synchronized springboard	July 28
Bronze	Jack Laugher	Diving	Men's 3 m springboard	July 31
Bronze	Tom Daley	Diving	Men's 10 m platform	August 2
Bronze	Ross Murdoch	Swimming	Men's 100 m breaststroke	August 3
Bronze	Siobhan-Marie O'Connor	Swimming	Women's 200 m individual medley	August 3
Bronze	Jazmin Carlin	Swimming	Women's 800 m freestyle	August 8

== Diving ==
British divers qualified for the individual spots and the synchronized teams at the World Championships. Nine divers have been nominated to the roster for Team GB at the Worlds, including 2012 Olympic bronze medalist Tom Daley.

Diving at the 2015 World Aquatics Championships was a qualification event for the 2016 Summer Olympics, and Great Britain, with a top three finish in the 3 m synchronized springboard for Jack Laugher and Chris Mears, achieved a quota place for a team at the Rio games. In the individual events, Tom Daley (10m platform) and Jack Laugher (3m springboard) both won bronze medals, and they, along with finalists Rebecca Gallantree (3 metre springboard) and Tonia Couch (10 metre platform), won a single quota place for Great Britain in each of the four individual diving events in Rio.

Men

Athlete	Event	Preliminaries		Semifinals		Final	
Athlete	Event	Points	Rank	Points	Rank	Points	Rank
James Denny	1 m springboard	309.60	26	—N/a		did not advance	
Jack Laugher	3 m springboard	450.80	7 Q	490.90	5 Q	528.90	3rd place, bronze medalist(s)
Chris Mears	3 m springboard	419.20	18 Q	422.50	15	did not advance	
Tom Daley	10 m platform	466.55	9 Q	524.70	3 Q	537.95	3rd place, bronze medalist(s)
Matthew Lee	10 m platform	437.35	14 Q	357.60	18	did not advance	
Jack Laugher; Chris Mears	3 m synchronized springboard	417.33	4 Q	—N/a		445.20	3rd place, bronze medalist(s)
James Denny; Matthew Lee	10 m synchronized platform	379.86	12 Q	—N/a		396.84	9

Women

Athlete	Event	Preliminaries		Semifinals		Final	
Athlete	Event	Points	Rank	Points	Rank	Points	Rank
Alicia Blagg	3 m springboard	262.55	26	did not advance			
Rebecca Gallantree	3 m springboard	294.15	13 Q	305.10	8 Q	289.00	10
Sarah Barrow	10 m platform	308.90	17 Q	283.10	18	did not advance	
Tonia Couch	10 m platform	328.70	9 Q	339.70	7 Q	340.30	8
Alicia Blagg; Rebecca Gallantree	3 m synchronized springboard	287.40	4 Q	—N/a		286.86	10
Sarah Barrow; Tonia Couch	10 m synchronized platform	302.52	4 Q	—N/a		308.40	6

Mixed

Athlete	Event	Final	
Athlete	Event	Points	Rank
Tom Daley; Rebecca Gallantree	Team	434.65	1st place, gold medalist(s)

== High diving ==
Great Britain has qualified two high divers at the World Championships.

Athlete	Event	Points	Rank
Blake Aldridge	Men's high diving	did not finish	
Gary Hunt	Men's high diving	629.30	1st place, gold medalist(s)

== Open water swimming ==
Great Britain fielded a full team of seven swimmers to compete in the open water marathon.

Men

Athlete	Event	Time	Rank
Tom Allen	5 km	55:32.0	23
Jack Burnell	10 km	1:50:05.8	5
Daniel Fogg	10 km	1:50:39.7	14
Caleb Hughes	5 km	55:21.9	7

Women

Athlete	Event	Time	Rank
Alice Dearing	5 km	1:00:53.3	23
Danielle Huskisson	10 km	2:00:57.3	35
Keri-Anne Payne	10 km	1:58:53.6	15

== Swimming ==
British swimmers have achieved qualifying standards in the following events (up to a maximum of 2 swimmers in each event at the A-standard entry time, and 1 at the B-standard): All British swimmers must qualify by finishing in the top two of the national championships, having gained the GB qualifying A standard set by British Swimming in the relevant final.

Great Britain consists of 30 swimmers (16 men and 14 women). Among the official roster featured European and Commonwealth Games champions Jazmin Carlin, Chris Walker-Hebborn, and Adam Peaty, who overhauled the 58-second barrier to set a new world record in the 100 m breaststroke at the national trials.

The championships were a qualification event for the relay races at the 2016 Summer Olympics, and Great Britain qualified for five of the six relays in Rio, the women's 4 x 100 freestyle being the exception, where they did not field a team in Kazan.

Great Britain's total of five golds and nine medals in the swimming pool are the best returns in golds and medals for Great Britain in the history of the Championships.

Men

Athlete	Event	Heat		Semifinal		Final	
Athlete	Event	Time	Rank	Time	Rank	Time	Rank
Adam Barrett	100 m butterfly	52.33	17	did not advance			
Nick Grainger	400 m freestyle	3:47.95	14	—N/a		did not advance	
James Guy	200 m freestyle	1:46.10	2 Q	1:45.43 NR	2 Q	1:45.18 NR	1st place, gold medalist(s)
James Guy	400 m freestyle	3:45.37	2 Q	—N/a		3:43.75 NR	2nd place, silver medalist(s)
Calum Jarvis	100 m freestyle	49.68	32	did not advance			
Calum Jarvis	200 m freestyle	1:46.61	5 Q	1:47.64	14	did not advance	
Tom Laxton	100 m butterfly	52.37	19	did not advance			
Stephen Milne	800 m freestyle	7:46.41	3 Q	—N/a		7:49.86	7
Stephen Milne	1500 m freestyle	14:55.17	4 Q	—N/a		14:58.62	5
Ross Murdoch	100 m breaststroke	59.48	4 Q	59.75	8 Q	59.09	3rd place, bronze medalist(s)
Roberto Pavoni	200 m individual medley	1:59.29	9 Q	1:58:54	=8	did not advance	
Roberto Pavoni	400 m individual medley	4:13.91	7 Q	—N/a		4:13.81	7
Adam Peaty	50 m breaststroke	26.68	2 Q	26.42 WR	1 Q	26.51	1st place, gold medalist(s)
Adam Peaty	100 m breaststroke	58.52 CR	1 Q	58.18 CR	1 Q	58.52	1st place, gold medalist(s)
Adam Peaty	200 m breaststroke	2:13.24	26	did not advance			
Benjamin Proud	50 m freestyle	22.13	7 Q	21.88	5 Q	22.04	8
Benjamin Proud	100 m freestyle	49.35	23	did not advance			
Benjamin Proud	50 m butterfly	23.58	11 Q	23.24	6 Q	23.39	8
Liam Tancock	50 m backstroke	24.91	6 Q	24.75	5 Q	24.88	7
Liam Tancock	100 m backstroke	53.35	4 Q	53.19	7 Q	53.37	8
Chris Walker-Hebborn	100 m backstroke	53.64	7 Q	53.39	6 Q	53.02	5
Daniel Wallace	200 m individual medley	1:58.28	2 Q	1:57.77	4 Q	1:57.56	4
Daniel Wallace	400 m individual medley	4:13.07	5 Q	—N/a		4:13.77	6
Andrew Willis	200 m breaststroke	2:09.35	2 Q	2:08.72	5 Q	2:08.52	4
Calum Jarvis; Benjamin Proud; Robbie Renwick; Duncan Scott	4 × 100 m freestyle relay	3:15.70	10	—N/a		did not advance	
Dan Wallace; Robbie Renwick; Calum Jarvis; James Guy; Nick Grainger*; Duncan Scott*	4 × 200 m freestyle relay	7:09.00	3 Q	—N/a		7:04.33 NR	1st place, gold medalist(s)
Adam Barrett*; James Guy; Ross Murdoch*; Adam Peaty; Benjamin Proud; Chris Walker-Hebborn	4 × 100 m medley relay	3:33.37	6 Q	—N/a		3:30.67 NR	4

Women

Athlete	Event	Heat		Semifinal		Final	
Athlete	Event	Time	Rank	Time	Rank	Time	Rank
Jazmin Carlin	400 m freestyle	4:07.15	=6 Q	—N/a		4:03.74	4
Jazmin Carlin	800 m freestyle	8:23.83	5 Q	—N/a		8:18.15	3rd place, bronze medalist(s)
Francesca Halsall	50 m freestyle	24.80	8 Q	24.50	7 Q	24.51	7
Francesca Halsall	50 m butterfly	25.86	5 Q	25.71	3 Q	25.85	6
Rachael Kelly	100 m butterfly	58.48	=16 Q	58.27	12	did not advance	
Jemma Lowe	100 m butterfly	58.74	19	did not advance			
Hannah Miley	200 m butterfly	2:09.44	13 Q	2:09.21	=14	did not advance	
Hannah Miley	200 m individual medley	2:12.22	7 Q	2:11.19	7 Q	2:10.19	5
Hannah Miley	400 m individual medley	4:36.11	4 Q	—N/a		4:34.79	4
Siobhan-Marie O'Connor	200 m freestyle	1:58.27	11 Q	1:57.30	10	did not advance	
Siobhan-Marie O'Connor	200 m individual medley	2:08.92	2 Q	2:08.45	2 Q	2:08.77	3rd place, bronze medalist(s)
Lauren Quigley	50 m freestyle	25.53	28	did not advance			
Lauren Quigley	50 m backstroke	27.94	6 Q	27.88	7 Q	27.99	7
Lauren Quigley	100 m backstroke	1:00.14	=7 Q	59.71	8 Q	59.78	7
Molly Renshaw	200 m breaststroke	2:26.32	18	did not advance			
Elizabeth Simmonds	100 m backstroke	1:00.38	11 Q	1:00.40	13	did not advance	
Elizabeth Simmonds	200 m backstroke	2:10.48	13 Q	2:10.57	12	did not advance	
Jessica Thielmann	800 m freestyle	2:36.88	15	—N/a		did not advance	
Jessica Thielmann	1500 m freestyle	16:21.21	10	—N/a		did not advance	
Aimee Willmott	200 m butterfly	2:10.07	19	did not advance			
Aimee Willmott	400 m individual medley	4:36.82	7 Q	—N/a		4:38.75	7
Siobhan-Marie O'Connor; Jazmin Carlin; Rebecca Turner; Hannah Miley; Eleanor Faulkner*	4 × 200 m freestyle relay	7:54.99	7 Q	—N/a		7:50.60	5
Rachael Kelly; Siobhan-Marie O'Connor; Lauren Quigley; Rebecca Turner	4 × 100 m medley relay	4:00.02	7 Q	—N/a		DSQ	

Mixed

Athlete	Event	Heat		Final	
Athlete	Event	Time	Rank	Time	Rank
Chris Walker-Hebborn; Adam Peaty; Siobhan-Marie O'Connor; Francesca Halsall; Ross Murdoch*; Rachael Kelly*	4 × 100 m medley relay	3:44.39	2 Q	3:41.71 WR	1st place, gold medalist(s)

== Synchronized swimming ==
Great Britain has qualified two synchronized swimmers in the women's duet events.

Athlete	Event	Preliminaries		Final	
Athlete	Event	Points	Rank	Points	Rank
Jodie Cowie; Genevieve Randall	Duet technical routine	74.6512	24	did not advance	
Jodie Cowie; Genevieve Randall	Duet free routine	76.0333	24	did not advance	
