= Swimming at the 2015 World Aquatics Championships – Women's 200 metre freestyle =

Women's 200 metre freestyle at the 2015 World Aquatics Championships
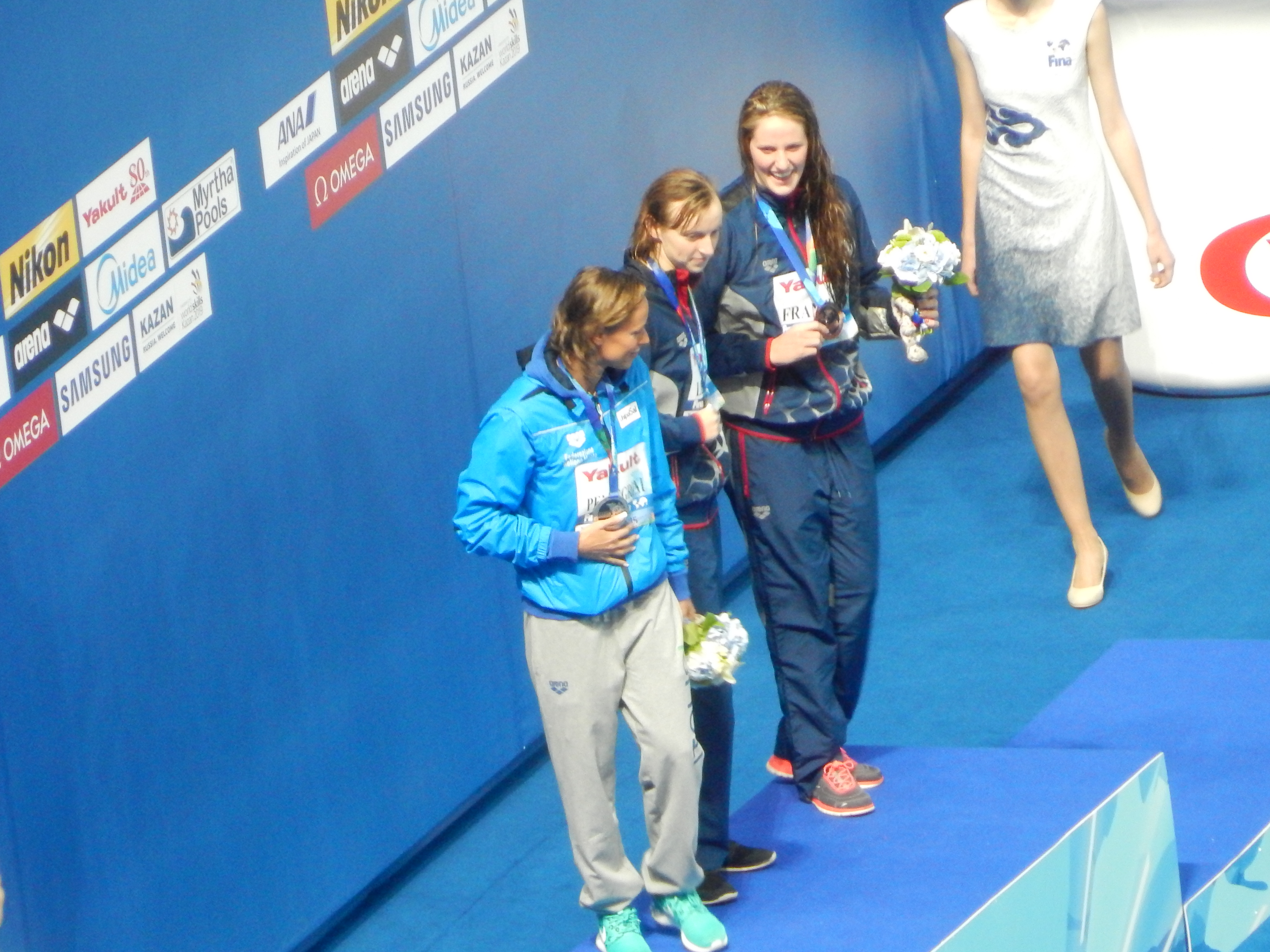
- Victory Ceremony
- Dates: 4 August (heats and semifinals); 5 August (final)
- Competitors: 63 from 52 nations
- Winning time: 1:55.16

Medalists
| gold medal | Katie Ledecky | United States |
| silver medal | Federica Pellegrini | Italy |
| bronze medal | Missy Franklin | United States |

The Women's 200 metre freestyle competition of the swimming events at the 2015 World Aquatics Championships was held on 4 August with the heats and the semifinals and 5 August with the final.

== Records ==
Prior to the competition, the existing world and championship records were as follows.

| World record | Federica Pellegrini (ITA) | 1:52.98 | Rome, Italy | 29 July 2009 |
| Competition record | Federica Pellegrini (ITA) | 1:52.98 | Rome, Italy | 29 July 2009 |

== Results ==
=== Heats ===
The heats were held at 09:49.

| Rank | Heat | Lane | Name | Nationality | Time | Notes |
|---|---|---|---|---|---|---|
| 1 | 5 | 4 | Katie Ledecky | United States | 1:55.82 | Q |
| 2 | 5 | 5 | Katinka Hosszú | Hungary | 1:56.32 | Q |
| 3 | 6 | 3 | Missy Franklin | United States | 1:56.42 | Q |
| 4 | 5 | 3 | Shen Duo | China | 1:56.75 | Q |
| 5 | 7 | 3 | Veronika Popova | Russia | 1:57.18 | Q |
| 6 | 6 | 4 | Federica Pellegrini | Italy | 1:57.34 | Q |
| 7 | 7 | 5 | Emma McKeon | Australia | 1:57.78 | Q |
| 8 | 7 | 6 | Charlotte Bonnet | France | 1:57.99 | Q |
| 9 | 7 | 4 | Femke Heemskerk | Netherlands | 1:58.10 | Q |
| 10 | 6 | 6 | Michelle Coleman | Sweden | 1:58.11 | Q |
| 11 | 6 | 5 | Siobhan-Marie O'Connor | Great Britain | 1:58.27 | Q |
| 11 | 6 | 7 | Guo Junjun | China | 1:58.27 | Q |
| 13 | 5 | 2 | Viktoriya Andreyeva | Russia | 1:58.31 | Q |
| 13 | 5 | 7 | Chihiro Igarashi | Japan | 1:58.31 | Q |
| 15 | 5 | 1 | Nina Rangelova | Bulgaria | 1:58.41 | Q |
| 16 | 5 | 8 | Manuella Lyrio | Brazil | 1:58.68 | Q |
| 17 | 7 | 2 | Melanie Wright | Australia | 1:58.94 | |
| 18 | 5 | 6 | Melania Costa | Spain | 1:59.00 | |
| 19 | 5 | 0 | Louise Hansson | Sweden | 1:59.34 | |
| 20 | 7 | 8 | Sachi Mochida | Japan | 1:59.35 | |
| 21 | 6 | 8 | Emily Overholt | Canada | 1:59.61 | |
| 22 | 6 | 2 | Alice Mizzau | Italy | 1:59.68 | |
| 23 | 7 | 7 | Coralie Balmy | France | 1:59.70 | |
| 24 | 6 | 1 | Lisa Zaiser | Austria | 1:59.97 | |
| 25 | 3 | 8 | Anna Kolářová | Czech Republic | 2:00.24 | |
| 26 | 7 | 0 | Katerine Savard | Canada | 2:00.30 | |
| 27 | 7 | 1 | Larissa Oliveira | Brazil | 2:00.35 | |
| 28 | 4 | 4 | Cecilie Johannessen | Norway | 2:00.67 | |
| 29 | 4 | 5 | Katarína Listopadová | Slovakia | 2:00.69 | |
| 30 | 6 | 0 | Evelyn Verrasztó | Hungary | 2:00.72 | |
| 31 | 5 | 9 | Nguyễn Thị Ánh Viên | Vietnam | 2:00.80 | |
| 32 | 6 | 9 | Camille Cheng | Hong Kong | 2:00.96 | |
| 33 | 4 | 3 | Theodora Giareni | Greece | 2:01.00 | |
| 34 | 4 | 0 | Danielle Villars | Switzerland | 2:01.03 | |
| 35 | 3 | 3 | Anastasia Bogdanovski | North Macedonia | 2:01.28 | NR |
| 36 | 4 | 2 | Jessica Camposano | Colombia | 2:01.81 | |
| 36 | 4 | 1 | Jasmine Al-Khaldi | Philippines | 2:01.81 | |
| 38 | 4 | 9 | Quah Ting Wen | Singapore | 2:02.13 | |
| 39 | 3 | 2 | Gaja Natlačen | Slovenia | 2:02.32 | |
| 40 | 4 | 8 | Kimberly Buys | Belgium | 2:02.54 | |
| 41 | 3 | 6 | Gizem Bozkurt | Turkey | 2:02.63 | |
| 42 | 4 | 6 | Natthanan Junkrajang | Thailand | 2:02.83 | |
| 43 | 3 | 7 | Julia Hassler | Liechtenstein | 2:03.08 | |
| 44 | 4 | 7 | Katarina Simonović | Serbia | 2:03.21 | |
| 45 | 3 | 1 | Monique Olivier | Luxembourg | 2:03.23 | |
| 46 | 3 | 5 | Elisbet Gámez | Cuba | 2:03.56 | |
| 47 | 3 | 4 | Sycerika McMahon | Ireland | 2:03.89 | |
| 48 | 3 | 0 | Andrea Cedrón | Peru | 2:04.07 | |
| 49 | 2 | 3 | Sara Pastrana | Honduras | 2:06.15 | |
| 50 | 2 | 4 | Rebeca Quinteros | El Salvador | 2:06.75 | |
| 51 | 2 | 1 | Arianna Sanna | Dominican Republic | 2:07.24 | NR |
| 52 | 2 | 5 | Lani Cabrera | Barbados | 2:07.75 | |
| 53 | 2 | 7 | Elena Giovannini | San Marino | 2:07.84 | |
| 54 | 3 | 9 | Chrysoula Karamanou | Cyprus | 2:09.01 | |
| 55 | 2 | 2 | Matelita Buadromo | Fiji | 2:09.07 | |
| 56 | 2 | 6 | Lydia Musleh | Jordan | 2:09.74 | |
| 57 | 2 | 0 | Nadia Tudo | Andorra | 2:12.21 | |
| 58 | 2 | 9 | Nikol Merizaj | Albania | 2:14.58 | |
| 59 | 2 | 8 | Ani Poghosyan | Armenia | 2:16.22 | |
| 60 | 1 | 4 | Sofia Shah | Nepal | 2:18.93 | |
| 61 | 1 | 3 | Kaya Forson | Ghana | 2:23.72 | |
| 62 | 1 | 6 | Aminath Shajan | Maldives | 2:28.75 | |
| 63 | 1 | 5 | Nada Arkaji | Qatar | 2:30.40 | |
| | 7 | 9 | Johanna Friedrich | Germany | | DNS |

=== Semifinals ===
The semifinals were held on 4 August at 18:44.

==== Semifinal 1 ====
| Rank | Lane | Name | Nationality | Time | Notes |
|---|---|---|---|---|---|
| 1 | 3 | Federica Pellegrini | Italy | 1:56.23 | Q |
| 2 | 5 | Shen Duo | China | 1:56.44 | Q |
| 3 | 4 | Katinka Hosszú | Hungary | 1:56.51 | Q |
| 4 | 6 | Charlotte Bonnet | France | 1:57.01 | |
| 5 | 1 | Chihiro Igarashi | Japan | 1:57.75 | |
| 6 | 7 | Guo Junjun | China | 1:57.79 | |
| 7 | 2 | Michelle Coleman | Sweden | 1:58.12 | |
| 8 | 8 | Manuella Lyrio | Brazil | 1:59.28 | |

==== Semifinal 2 ====
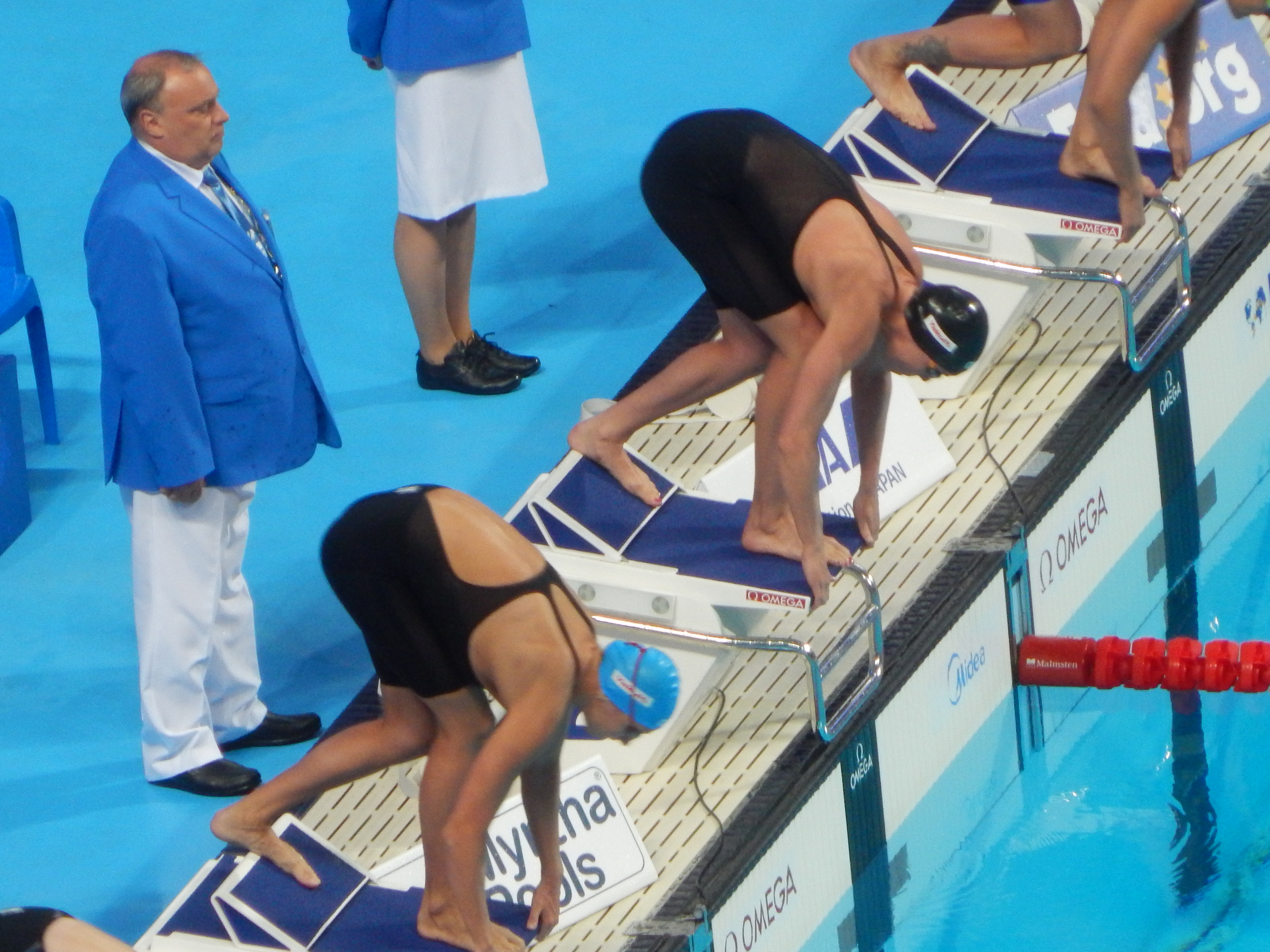
Popova and Heemskerk successfully qualified to final

| Rank | Lane | Name | Nationality | Time | Notes |
|---|---|---|---|---|---|
| 1 | 5 | Missy Franklin | United States | 1:56.37 | Q |
| 2 | 3 | Veronika Popova | Russia | 1:56.56 | Q |
| 3 | 4 | Katie Ledecky | United States | 1:56.76 | Q |
| 4 | 2 | Femke Heemskerk | Netherlands | 1:56.91 | Q |
| 5 | 6 | Emma McKeon | Australia | 1:56.95 | Q |
| 6 | 7 | Siobhan-Marie O'Connor | Great Britain | 1:57.30 | |
| 7 | 1 | Viktoriya Andreyeva | Russia | 1:58.14 | |
| 8 | 8 | Nina Rangelova | Bulgaria | 1:59.54 | |

=== Final ===
The final was held at 18:01.

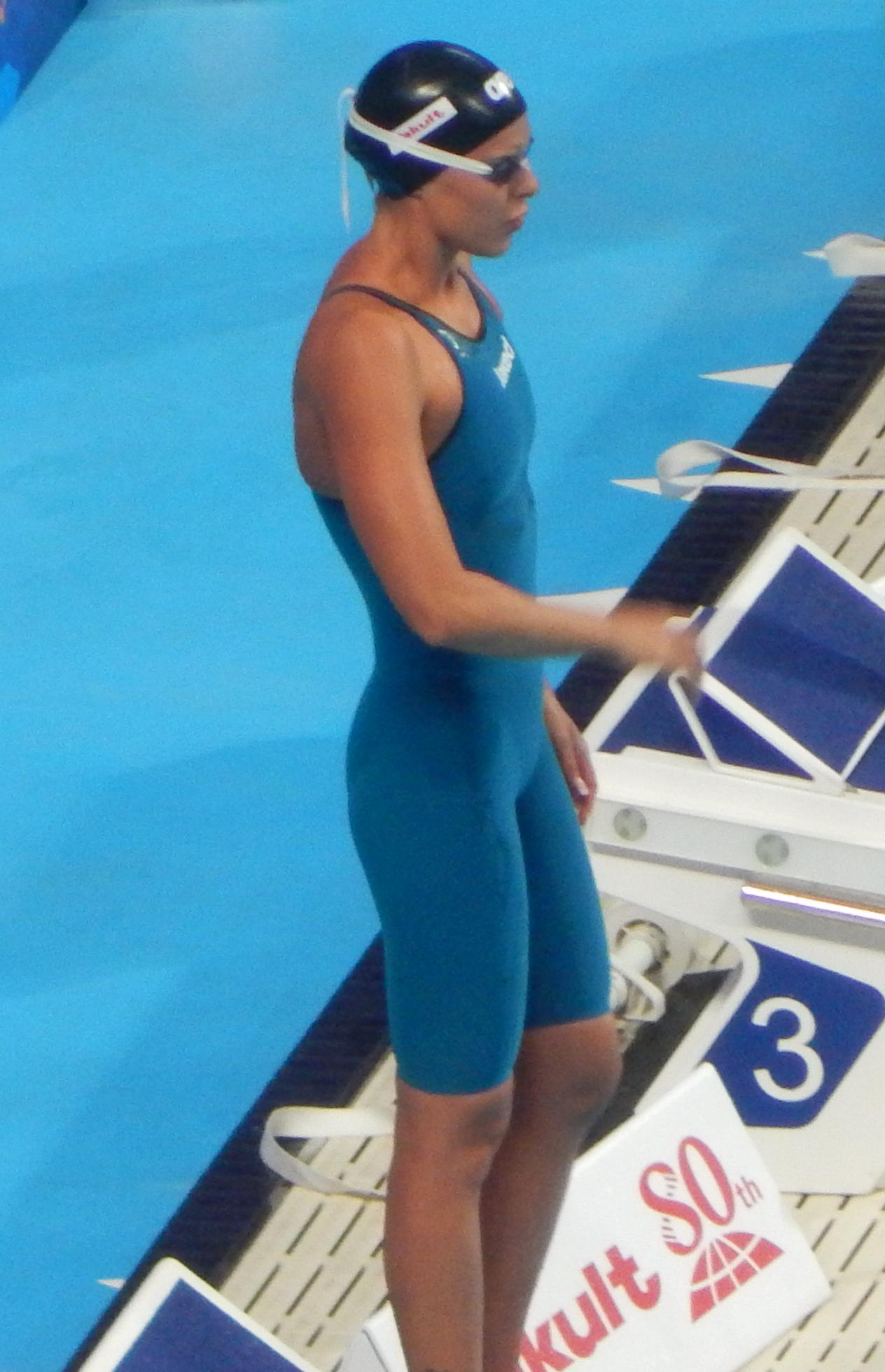
Federica Pellegrini wins silver

| Rank | Lane | Name | Nationality | Time | Notes |
|---|---|---|---|---|---|
| 1st place, gold medalist(s) | 7 | Katie Ledecky | United States | 1:55.16 | |
| 2nd place, silver medalist(s) | 4 | Federica Pellegrini | Italy | 1:55.32 | |
| 3rd place, bronze medalist(s) | 5 | Missy Franklin | United States | 1:55.49 | |
| 4 | 2 | Veronika Popova | Russia | 1:56.16 | |
| 5 | 6 | Katinka Hosszú | Hungary | 1:56.19 | NR |
| 6 | 3 | Shen Duo | China | 1:56.27 | |
| 7 | 8 | Emma McKeon | Australia | 1:56.41 | |
| 8 | 1 | Femke Heemskerk | Netherlands | 1:56.79 | |
