= Swimming at the 2015 World Aquatics Championships – Men's 50 metre backstroke =

Men's 50 metre backstroke at the 2015 World Aquatics Championships
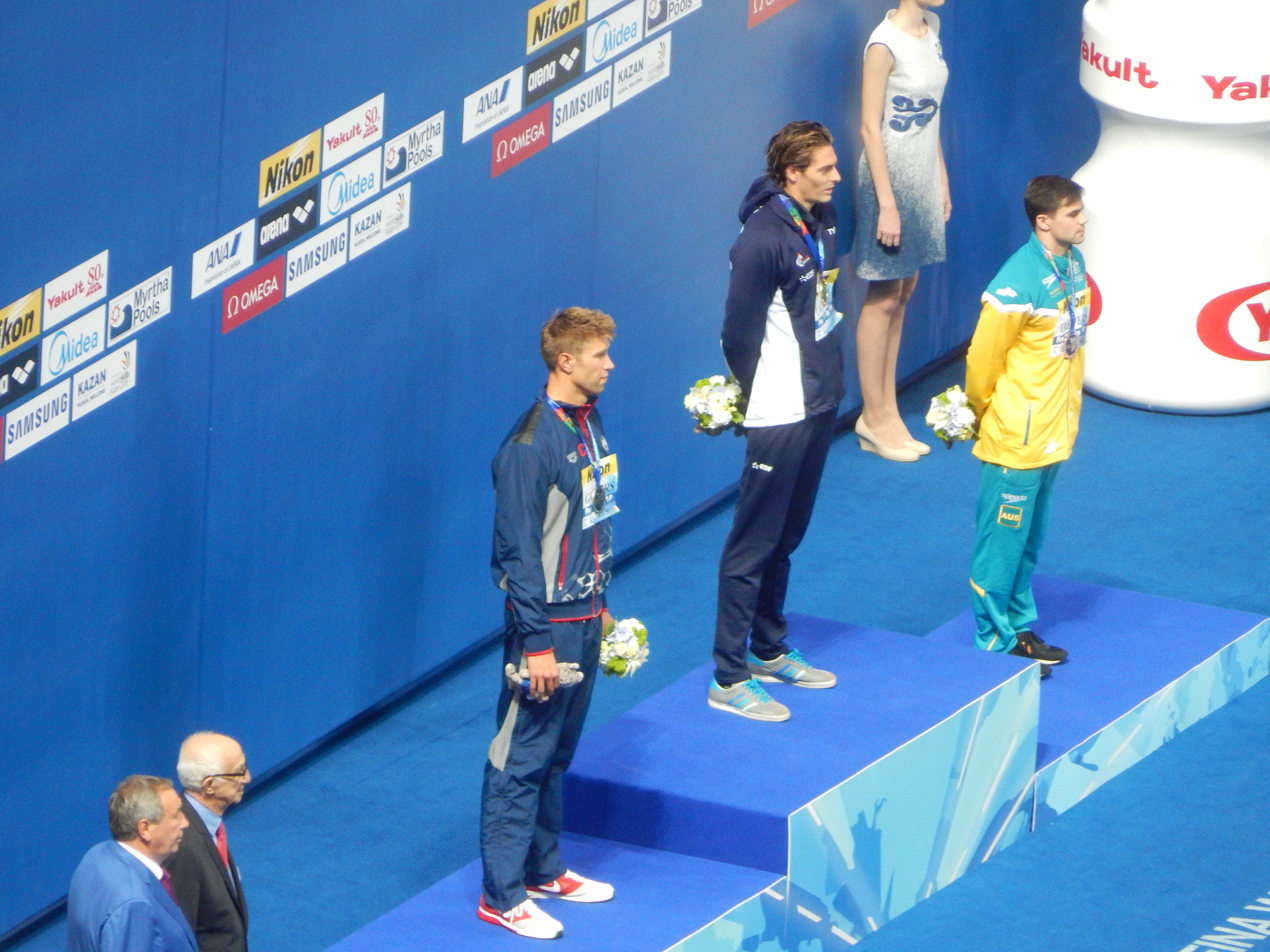
- Victory Ceremony
- Dates: 8 August (heats and semifinals); 9 August (final)
- Competitors: 68 from 61 nations
- Winning time: 24.23

Medalists
gold medal	Camille Lacourt	France
silver medal	Matt Grevers	United States
bronze medal	Ben Treffers	Australia

The Men's 50 metre backstroke competition of the swimming events at the 2015 World Aquatics Championships was held on 8 August with the heats and the semifinals and 9 August with the final.

== Records ==
Prior to the competition, the existing world and championship records were as follows.

World record	Liam Tancock (GBR)	24.04	Rome, Italy	2 August 2009
Competition record	Liam Tancock (GBR)	24.04	Rome, Italy	2 August 2009

== Results ==
=== Heats ===
The heats were held at 09:54.

Rank	Heat	Lane	Name	Nationality	Time	Notes
1	5	4	Camille Lacourt	France	24.56	Q
2	5	3	Matt Grevers	United States	24.68	Q
3	6	4	Ben Treffers	Australia	24.74	Q
4	5	5	Mitch Larkin	Australia	24.77	Q
5	6	5	David Plummer	United States	24.79	Q
6	6	6	Liam Tancock	Great Britain	24.91	Q
7	7	5	Jérémy Stravius	France	24.95	Q
8	7	7	Pavel Sankovich	Belarus	24.97	Q, NR
9	7	6	Carl Schwarz	Germany	25.12	Q
10	6	2	Jonatan Kopelev	Israel	25.14	Q
11	7	2	Simone Sabbioni	Italy	25.21	Q
12	7	3	Tomasz Polewka	Poland	25.25	Q
13	5	1	Grigory Tarasevich	Russia	25.27	Q
13	7	4	Vladimir Morozov	Russia	25.27	Q
15	5	7	Lavrans Solli	Norway	25.28	Q
16	6	3	Miguel Ortiz-Cañavate	Spain	25.29	QSO
16	6	1	Guilherme Guido	Brazil	25.29	QSO
18	5	6	Guy Barnea	Israel	25.31	
19	5	0	Park Seon-kwan	South Korea	25.33	
20	7	8	Quah Zheng Wen	Singapore	25.44	
21	4	6	Ralf Tribuntsov	Estonia	25.45	
22	4	4	Robert Glință	Romania	25.48	
23	4	5	Masaki Kaneko	Japan	25.49	
24	6	8	Apostolos Christou	Greece	25.50	
25	5	2	Juan Miguel Rando	Spain	25.54	
26	6	0	François Heersbrandt	Belgium	25.55	
27	4	1	Federico Grabich	Argentina	25.60	
28	3	1	Alexis Santos	Portugal	25.70	
29	7	1	Xu Jiayu	China	25.71	
30	5	8	I Gede Siman Sudartawa	Indonesia	25.77	
31	6	7	Russell Wood	Canada	25.79	
32	7	0	Viktar Staselovich	Belarus	25.85	
33	4	7	Iskender Baskalov	Turkey	25.94	
34	4	3	Albert Subirats	Venezuela	26.07	
35	4	8	Ryan Pini	Papua New Guinea	26.11	
36	7	9	Lê Nguyễn Paul	Vietnam	26.14	
37	5	9	Janis Šaltans	Latvia	26.19	
38	4	2	Kasipat Chograthin	Thailand	26.20	
39	4	9	Omar Pinzón	Colombia	26.27	
40	3	5	Mohamed Hussein	Egypt	26.42	
40	3	3	Daniil Bukin	Uzbekistan	26.42	
42	3	8	Jamal Chavoshifar	Iran	26.53	
43	3	7	David McLeod	Trinidad and Tobago	26.54	
44	4	0	Charles Hockin	Paraguay	26.57	
45	2	5	Merdan Atayev	Turkmenistan	26.64	
46	3	6	Martin Zhelev	Bulgaria	26.66	
47	3	0	Tern Tern	Malaysia	26.73	
48	3	4	Daniel Ramírez	Mexico	26.84	
49	2	6	David van der Colff	Botswana	26.88	
50	3	2	Riyad Djendouci	Algeria	27.20	
51	3	9	Ngou Pok Man	Macau	27.20	
52	2	3	Timothy Wynter	Jamaica	27.21	
53	2	7	Eisner Barbarena	Nicaragua	27.35	
54	2	2	Hamdan Bayusuf	Kenya	27.74	
55	2	4	Yaaqoub Al-Saadi	United Arab Emirates	28.04	
56	2	8	Noah Mascoll-Gomes	Antigua and Barbuda	28.69	
57	2	1	Samson Opuakpo	Nigeria	28.70	
58	2	9	Mohammad Ahmed	Bangladesh	29.10	
59	2	0	Faraj Saleh	Bahrain	29.66	
60	1	3	Adam Allouche	Lebanon	29.91	
61	1	4	Arnold Kisulo	Uganda	29.98	
62	1	5	Kerry Ollivierre	Grenada	30.42	
63	1	6	Kwesi Jackson	Ghana	31.08	
64	1	7	Ramziyor Khorkashov	Tajikistan	33.15	
65	1	8	Santisouk Inthavong	Laos	33.24	
66	1	2	Tano Atta	Ivory Coast	33.92	
67	1	0	Ebrahim Al-Maleki	Yemen	34.19	
68	1	1	Moris Beale	Sierra Leone	35.85	
	6	9	Gábor Balog	Hungary		DNS

==== Swim-off ====
It was established that there would be a swim-off between the Brazilian Guilherme Guido and the Spanish Miguel Ortiz. However Guido chose not to swim the race, preferring to rest and focus on the 4 × 100 medley relay.

=== Semifinals ===
The semifinals were held on 8 August at 18.45.

==== Semifinal 1 ====
Rank	Lane	Name	Nationality	Time	Notes
1	4	Matt Grevers	United States	24.59	Q
2	5	Mitch Larkin	Australia	24.65	Q
3	3	Liam Tancock	Great Britain	24.75	Q
4	1	Vladimir Morozov	Russia	24.77	Q
5	6	Pavel Sankovich	Belarus	25.02	
6	2	Jonatan Kopelev	Israel	25.04	
7	7	Tomasz Polewka	Poland	25.11	NR
8	8	Miguel Ortiz-Cañavate	Spain	25.19	

==== Semifinal 2 ====
Rank	Lane	Name	Nationality	Time	Notes
1	4	Camille Lacourt	France	24.27	Q
2	5	Ben Treffers	Australia	24.64	Q
3	3	David Plummer	United States	24.82	Q
4	8	Lavrans Solli	Norway	24.93	Q, NR
5	6	Jérémy Stravius	France	24.94	
6	7	Simone Sabbioni	Italy	25.05	
7	2	Carl Schwarz	Germany	25.20	
8	1	Grigory Tarasevich	Russia	25.42	

=== Final ===
The final was held on 9 August at 16:32.

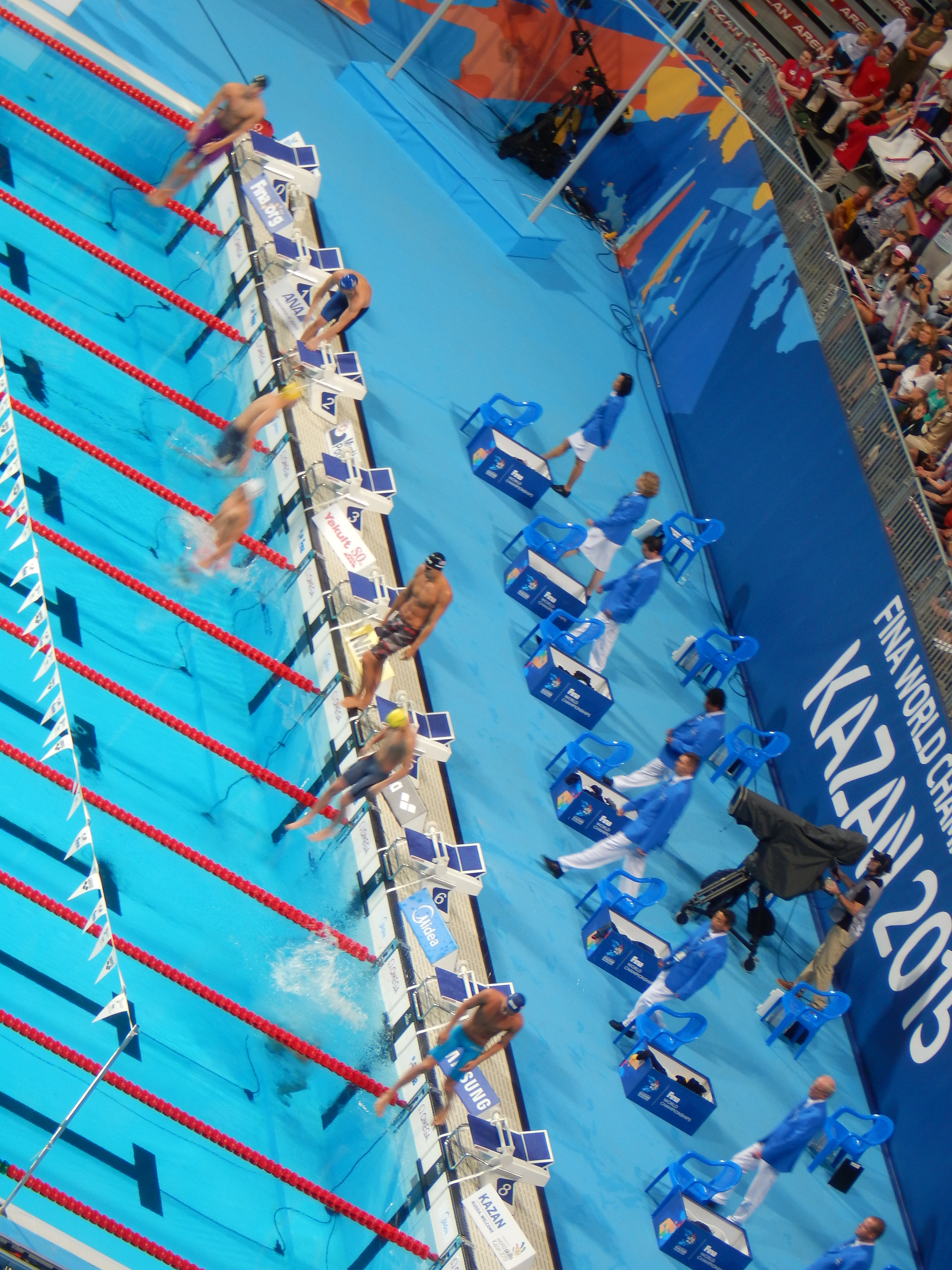
Final

Rank	Lane	Name	Nationality	Time	Notes
1st place, gold medalist(s)	4	Camille Lacourt	France	24.23	
2nd place, silver medalist(s)	5	Matt Grevers	United States	24.61	
3rd place, bronze medalist(s)	3	Ben Treffers	Australia	24.69	
4	6	Mitch Larkin	Australia	24.70	
5	7	Vladimir Morozov	Russia	24.73	
6	8	Lavrans Solli	Norway	24.84	NR
7	2	Liam Tancock	Great Britain	24.88	
8	1	David Plummer	United States	24.95	
