= Swimming at the 2015 World Aquatics Championships – Men's 200 metre breaststroke =

Men's 200 metre breaststroke at the 2015 World Aquatics Championships
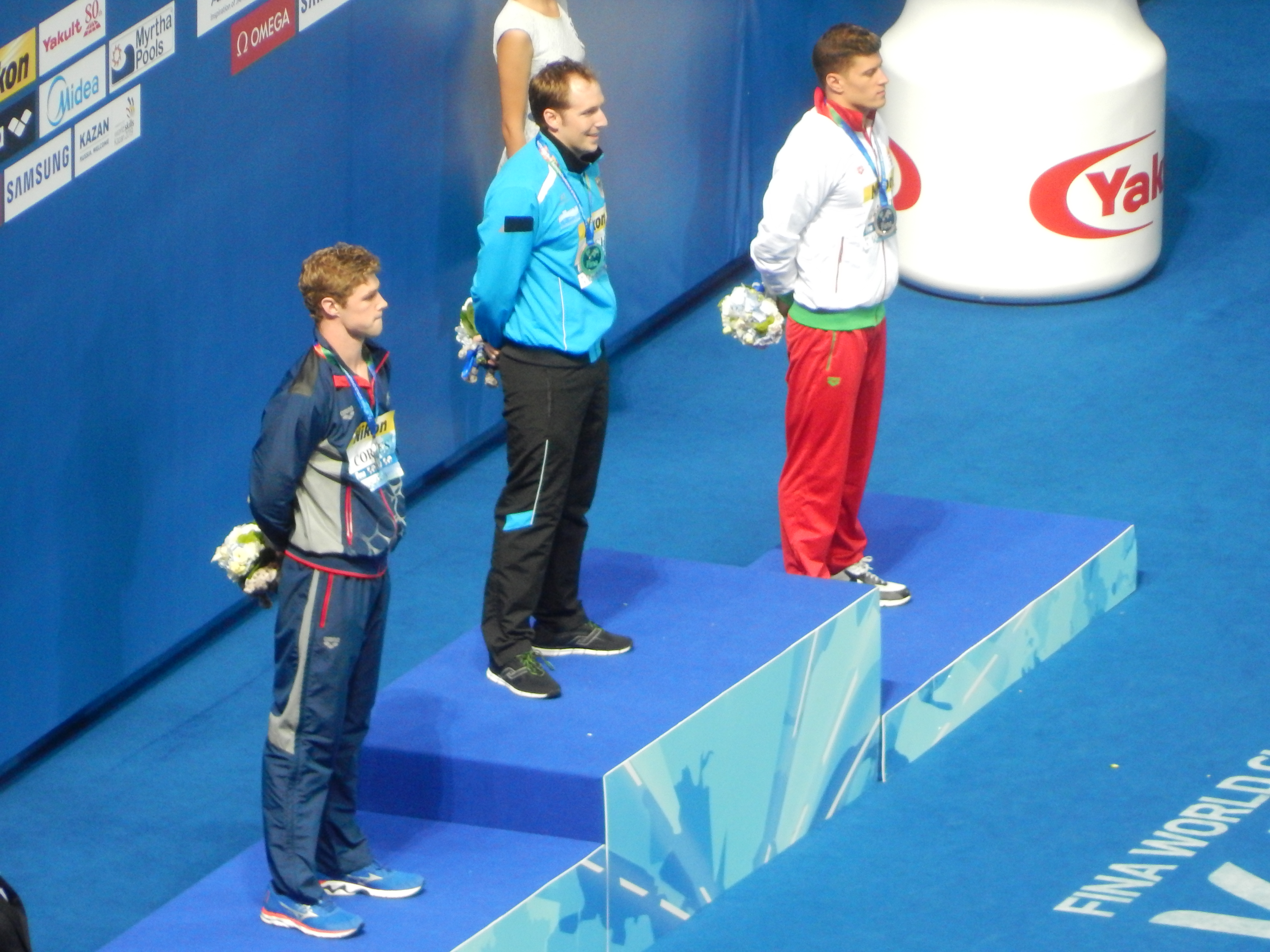
- Victory Ceremony
- Dates: 6 August (heats and semifinals); 7 August (final)
- Competitors: 52 from 44 nations
- Winning time: 2:07.76

Medalists
gold medal	Marco Koch	Germany
silver medal	Kevin Cordes	United States
bronze medal	Dániel Gyurta	Hungary

The Men's 200 metre breaststroke competition of the swimming events at the 2015 World Aquatics Championships was held on 6 August with the heats and the semifinals and 7 August with the final.

== Records ==
Prior to the competition, the existing world and championship records were as follows.

World record	Akihiro Yamaguchi (JPN)	2:07.01	Gifu, Gifu, Japan	15 September 2012
Competition record	Dániel Gyurta (HUN)	2:07.23	Barcelona, Spain	2 August 2013

== Results ==
=== Heats ===
The heats were held at 10:33.

Rank	Heat	Lane	Name	Nationality	Time	Notes
1	6	4	Marco Koch	Germany	2:09.12	Q
2	6	3	Andrew Willis	Great Britain	2:09.35	Q
3	6	7	Mao Feilian	China	2:09.56	Q, NR
4	5	4	Dmitriy Balandin	Kazakhstan	2:09.75	Q
5	4	5	Dániel Gyurta	Hungary	2:09.81	Q
6	5	0	Matti Mattsson	Finland	2:09.89	Q
7	6	5	Kevin Cordes	United States	2:09.94	Q
8	4	7	Anton Chupkov	Russia	2:09.97	Q
9	6	6	Ilya Khomenko	Russia	2:10.13	Q
10	4	2	Anton Sveinn McKee	Iceland	2:10.21	Q, NR
11	5	1	Erik Persson	Sweden	2:10.41	Q, NR
12	4	3	Nic Fink	United States	2:10.43	Q
13	4	4	Yasuhiro Koseki	Japan	2:10.47	Q
14	4	6	Christian vom Lehn	Germany	2:10.71	Q
15	5	7	Luca Pizzini	Italy	2:11.00	Q
16	5	3	Giedrius Titenis	Lithuania	2:11.11	Q
17	5	2	Li Xiang	China	2:11.30	
18	4	0	Laurent Carnol	Luxembourg	2:11.65	
18	5	9	Yannick Käser	Switzerland	2:11.65	NR
20	6	0	Carlos Claverie	Venezuela	2:12.33	
21	4	1	Cameron van der Burgh	South Africa	2:12.37	
22	6	8	Thomas Dahlia	France	2:12.64	
23	3	4	Glenn Snyders	New Zealand	2:12.71	
24	6	9	Tomáš Klobučník	Slovakia	2:12.74	
25	5	6	Ryo Tateishi	Japan	2:13.23	
26	5	5	Adam Peaty	Great Britain	2:13.24	
27	4	9	Richard Funk	Canada	2:13.33	
28	6	1	Panagiotis Samilidis	Greece	2:14.24	
29	6	2	Thiago Simon	Brazil	2:14.28	
30	3	3	Vladislav Mustafin	Uzbekistan	2:14.31	
31	2	3	Daniils Bobrovs	Latvia	2:14.85	
32	3	1	Jorge Murillo	Colombia	2:14.92	
33	4	8	Ayrton Sweeney	South Africa	2:14.98	
34	2	4	Martin Allikvee	Estonia	2:15.09	NR
35	3	6	Marcin Stolarski	Poland	2:15.47	
36	3	9	Diogo Carvalho	Portugal	2:15.58	
37	3	7	Ilya Shymanovich	Belarus	2:16.02	
38	5	8	Felipe França Silva	Brazil	2:16.13	
39	2	5	Lee Hsuan-yen	Chinese Taipei	2:16.28	
40	2	2	Ahmad Al-Bader	Kuwait	2:16.50	
41	3	8	Christoph Meier	Liechtenstein	2:17.07	
42	2	7	Irakli Bolkvadze	Georgia	2:17.30	
43	3	0	Azad Al-Barazi	Syria	2:18.19	
44	3	5	Sandeep Sejwal	India	2:18.68	
45	2	6	Mauro Castillo	Mexico	2:19.07	
46	2	8	Arya Nasimi Shad	Iran	2:20.22	
47	1	4	Anton Zheltyakov	Azerbaijan	2:20.83	
48	3	2	Radomyos Matjiur	Thailand	2:21.30	
49	2	1	Julian Fletcher	Bermuda	2:21.39	
50	2	0	Denis Petrashov	Kyrgyzstan	2:22.84	
51	1	5	Adriel Sanes	Virgin Islands	2:24.91	
52	1	3	Simanga Dlamini	Eswatini	2:45.73	

=== Semifinals ===
The semifinals were held at 18:29.

==== Semifinal 1 ====
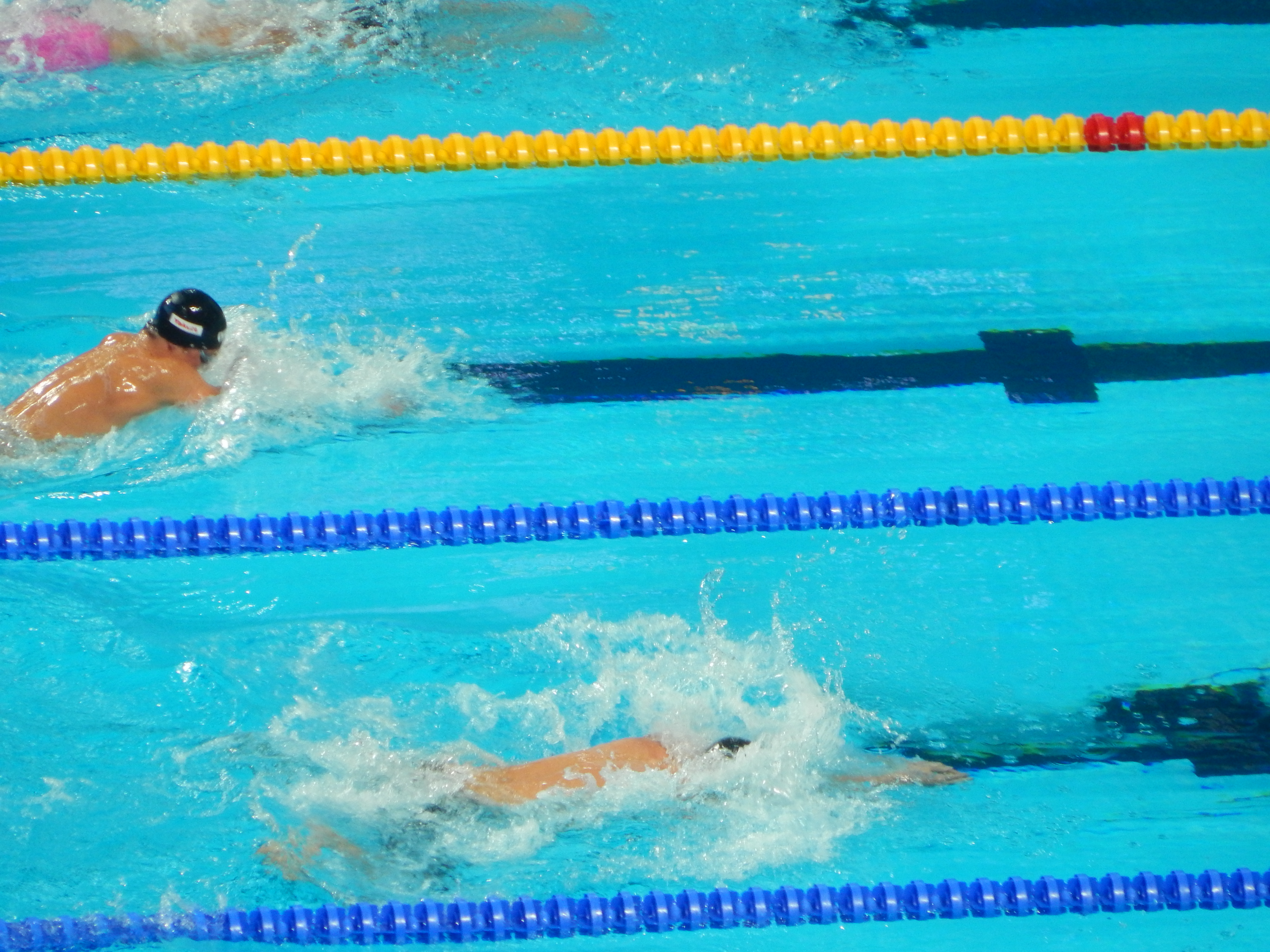
Semifinal 1

Rank	Lane	Name	Nationality	Time	Notes
1	4	Andrew Willis	Great Britain	2:08.72	Q
2	5	Dmitriy Balandin	Kazakhstan	2:09.22	Q
3	6	Anton Chupkov	Russia	2:09.64	Q, WJR
4	7	Nic Fink	United States	2:10.04	
5	8	Giedrius Titenis	Lithuania	2:10.45	
6	3	Matti Mattsson	Finland	2:10.51	
7	2	Anton Sveinn McKee	Iceland	2:10.79	
8	1	Christian vom Lehn	Germany	2:11.26	

==== Semifinal 2 ====
Rank	Lane	Name	Nationality	Time	Notes
1	1	Yasuhiro Koseki	Japan	2:08.03	Q
2	4	Marco Koch	Germany	2:08.34	Q
3	3	Dániel Gyurta	Hungary	2:08.53	Q
4	6	Kevin Cordes	United States	2:08.69	Q
5	5	Mao Feilian	China	2:09.54	Q, NR
6	2	Ilya Khomenko	Russia	2:09.86	
7	7	Erik Persson	Sweden	2:10.87	
8	8	Luca Pizzini	Italy	2:11.05	

=== Final ===
The final was held at 18:55.

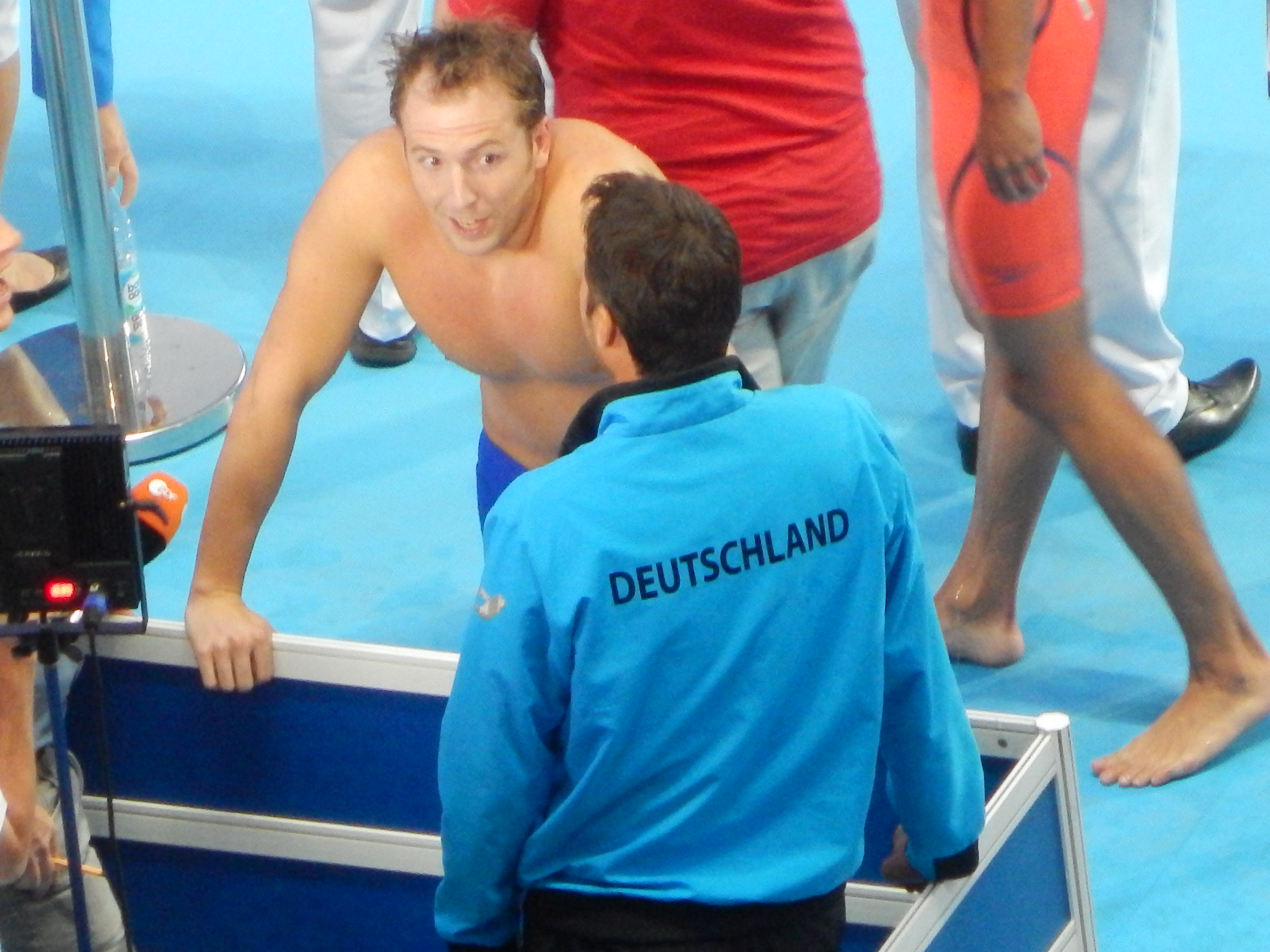
Koch wins gold

Rank	Lane	Name	Nationality	Time	Notes
1st place, gold medalist(s)	5	Marco Koch	Germany	2:07.76	
2nd place, silver medalist(s)	6	Kevin Cordes	United States	2:08.05	
3rd place, bronze medalist(s)	3	Dániel Gyurta	Hungary	2:08.10	
4	2	Andrew Willis	Great Britain	2:08.52	
5	4	Yasuhiro Koseki	Japan	2:09.12	
6	7	Dmitriy Balandin	Kazakhstan	2:09.58	
7	8	Anton Chupkov	Russia	2:09.96	
8	1	Mao Feilian	China	2:10.02	
