= Mexico at the 2015 World Aquatics Championships =

- Flag of Mexico
- World Aquatics code: MEX
- National federation: Federación Mexicana de Natación
- Website: www.fmn.org.mx

in Kazan, Russia
- Competitors: 49 in 5 sports
- Medals Ranked 20th: Gold 0 Silver 2 Bronze 0 Total 2

World Aquatics Championships appearances
- 1973; 1975; 1978; 1982; 1986; 1991; 1994; 1998; 2001; 2003; 2005; 2007; 2009; 2011; 2013; 2015; 2017; 2019; 2022; 2023; 2024; 2025

Mexico competed at the 2015 World Aquatics Championships in Kazan, Russia from 24 July to 9 August 2015.

== Medalists ==
Medal	Name	Sport	Event	Date
Silver	Iván García; Germán Sánchez	Diving	Men's 10 m synchronized platform	July 26
Silver	Jonathan Paredes	High diving	Men's high diving	August 5

== Diving ==
Mexican divers qualified for the individual spots and the synchronized teams at the World Championships.

Men

Athlete	Event	Preliminaries		Semifinals		Final	
Athlete	Event	Points	Rank	Points	Rank	Points	Rank
Jahir Ocampo	1 m springboard	412.70	1 Q	—N/a		427.35	4
Rommel Pacheco	1 m springboard	376.10	8 Q	—N/a		390.95	11
Yahel Castillo	3 m springboard	390.35	29	Did not advance			
Rommel Pacheco	3 m springboard	430.10	11 Q	483.15	7 Q	508.15	6
Iván García	10 m platform	498.25	5 Q	505.95	6 Q	518.95	4
José Ruvalcaba	10 m platform	428.90	17 Q	467.10	10 Q	442.15	12
Jahir Ocampo; Rommel Pacheco	3 m synchronized springboard	422.25	3 Q	—N/a		405.21	8
Iván García; Germán Sánchez	10 m synchronized platform	419.19	5 Q	—N/a		448.89	2nd place, silver medalist(s)

Women

Athlete	Event	Preliminaries		Semifinals		Final	
Athlete	Event	Points	Rank	Points	Rank	Points	Rank
Arantxa Chávez	1 m springboard	236.95	19	—N/a		Did not advance	
Dolores Hernandez	1 m springboard	242.75	12 Q	—N/a		241.90	11
Arantxa Chávez	3 m springboard	286.95	15 Q	257.10	18	Did not advance	
Dolores Hernandez	3 m springboard	263.70	24	Did not advance			
Paola Espinosa	10 m platform	354.90	4 Q	285.65	17	Did not advance	
Alejandra Estrella	10 m platform	247.30	33	Did not advance			
Arantxa Chávez; Melany Hernández	3 m synchronized springboard	273.93	10 Q	—N/a		296.19	7
Paola Espinosa; Alejandra Orozco	10 m synchronized platform	285.57	8 Q	—N/a		310.77	4

Mixed

Athlete	Event	Final	
Athlete	Event	Points	Rank
Rommel Pacheco; Dolores Hernández	3 m synchronized springboard	308.40	5
Jahir Ocampo; Paola Espinosa	10 m synchronized platform	294.24	8
Iván García; Arantxa Chávez	Team	399.40	6

== High diving ==
Mexico has qualified four high divers at the World Championships.

Athlete	Event	Points	Rank
Jorge Ferzuli	Men's high diving	357.50	17
Sergio Guzmán	Men's high diving	375.70	14
Jonathan Paredes	Men's high diving	596.45	2nd place, silver medalist(s)
Adriana Jiménez	Women's high diving	225.20	4

== Open water swimming ==
Mexico fielded a full team of eight swimmers to compete in the open water marathon.

Men

Athlete	Event	Time	Rank
Fernando Betanzos	5 km	58:25.7	36
Daniel Delgadillo	10 km	1:51:00.8	26
Arturo Pérez Vertti	10 km	1:54:18.4	48
Christian Tirado	5 km	59:47.8	39

Women

Athlete	Event	Time	Rank
Mayte Cano	5 km	1:04:25.7	28
Zaira Cardenas	10 km	2:00:07.9	29
Montserrat Ortuño	10 km	2:00:12.8	31
Melissa Villaseñor	5 km	1:04:40.3	29

Mixed

Athlete	Event	Time	Rank
Zaira Cardenas; Daniel Delgadillo; Arturo Pérez Vertti	Team	1:01:36.6	19

== Swimming ==
Mexican swimmers have achieved qualifying standards in the following events (up to a maximum of 2 swimmers in each event at the A-standard entry time, and 1 at the B-standard):

Men

Athlete	Event	Heat		Semifinal		Final	
Athlete	Event	Time	Rank	Time	Rank	Time	Rank
Mauro Castillo	50 m breaststroke	29.15	49	Did not advance			
Mauro Castillo	100 m breaststroke	1:03.91	53	Did not advance			
Mauro Castillo	200 m breaststroke	2:19.07	45	Did not advance			
Alejandro Escudero	50 m freestyle	23.38	45	Did not advance			
Alejandro Escudero	50 m butterfly	24.73	42	Did not advance			
Mateo González	100 m butterfly	55.28	50	Did not advance			
Mateo González	200 m individual medley	2:04.77	32	Did not advance			
Lorenzo Loría	100 m freestyle	51.18	58	Did not advance			
Lorenzo Loría	200 m freestyle	1:56.36	66	Did not advance			
Daniel Ramírez	100 m freestyle	50.70	50	Did not advance			
Daniel Ramírez	50 m backstroke	26.84	48	Did not advance			
Daniel Ramírez	100 m backstroke	DNS		Did not advance			
Daniel Ramírez	50 m butterfly	24.83	44	Did not advance			
Luis Ventura	400 m freestyle	4:00.79	55	—N/a		Did not advance	
Luis Ventura	1500 m freestyle	15:55.92	42	—N/a		Did not advance	
Luis Ventura	400 m individual medley	DNS		Did not advance			
Alejandro Escudero; Lorenzo Loría; Mateo González; Daniel Ramírez	4 × 100 m freestyle relay	3:23.49	25	—N/a		Did not advance	

Women

Athlete	Event	Heat		Semifinal		Final	
Athlete	Event	Time	Rank	Time	Rank	Time	Rank
Laura Arroyo	50 m butterfly	28.98	43	Did not advance			
Laura Arroyo	100 m butterfly	1:03.18	46	Did not advance			
Laura Arroyo	200 m butterfly	2:20.04	37	Did not advance			
Daniela Carrillo	50 m breaststroke	33.53	46	Did not advance			
Daniela Carrillo	100 m breaststroke	1:11.22	42	Did not advance			
Daniela Carrillo	200 m breaststroke	2:30.65	30	Did not advance			
Andrea García	50 m backstroke	30.94	42	Did not advance			
Andrea García	100 m backstroke	1:06.77	55	Did not advance			
Andrea García	200 m backstroke	DNS		Did not advance			
Georgina González	200 m individual medley	2:24.33	36	Did not advance			
Georgina González	400 m individual medley	5:05.62	34	—N/a		Did not advance	
Montserrat Ortuño	800 m freestyle	8:42.83	24	—N/a		Did not advance	
Montserrat Ortuño	1500 m freestyle	16:43.64	20	—N/a		Did not advance	
Sharo Rodríguez	50 m butterfly	29.13	45	Did not advance			
Sharo Rodríguez	100 m butterfly	1:02.97	45	Did not advance			
Sharo Rodríguez	200 m butterfly	2:19.60	35	Did not advance			
Lourdes Villaseñor	100 m backstroke	1:05.76	50	Did not advance			
Lourdes Villaseñor	200 m backstroke	2:19.07	36	Did not advance			
Laura Arroyo; Daniela Carrillo; Sharo Rodríguez; Lourdes Villaseñor	4 × 100 m medley relay	4:19.15	24	—N/a		Did not advance	

Mixed

Athlete	Event	Heat		Final	
Athlete	Event	Time	Rank	Time	Rank
Lourdes Villaseñor; Daniela Carrillo; Daniel Ramírez; Alejandro Escudero	4 × 100 m medley relay	4:00.81	14	Did not advance	

== Synchronized swimming ==
Mexico sent a full squad of twelve synchronized swimmers to compete in each of the following events.

Athlete	Event	Preliminaries		Final	
Athlete	Event	Points	Rank	Points	Rank
Karem Achach; Nuria Diosdado	Duet technical routine	83.1534	10 Q	83.8304	10
Karem Achach; Nuria Diosdado	Duet free routine	85.7000	9 Q	85.5333	10
Karem Achach; Regina Alferéz*; Teresa Alonso; Karla Arreola; Nuria Diosdado; Evelyn Guajardo; Joana Jímenez; Luisa Rubio; Jessica Sobrino; Amaya Velázquez*	Team technical routine	84.7543	9 Q	84.8431	9
Karem Achach; Teresa Alonso; Karla Arreola; Nuria Diosdado; Evelyn Guajardo; Joana Jímenez; Sofia Rios*; Luisa Rubio; Jessica Sobrino; Amaya Velázquez*	Team free routine	87.5000	8 Q	87.6333	8
Karem Achach*; Regina Alferéz; Teresa Alonso; Karla Arreola; Nuria Diosdado*; Evelyn Guajardo; Joana Jímenez; Wendy Mayor; Sofia Rios; Luisa Rubio; Jessica Sobrino; Amaya Velázquez	Free routine combination	85.3333	9 Q	86.5667	9
