= High diving at the 2015 World Aquatics Championships =

High diving at the 2015 World Aquatics Championship held in Russia

- Host city: (Russia) Kazan
- Date(s): 3–5 August
- Venue(s): Kazanka river bank near the Kazan Kremlin
- Events: 2

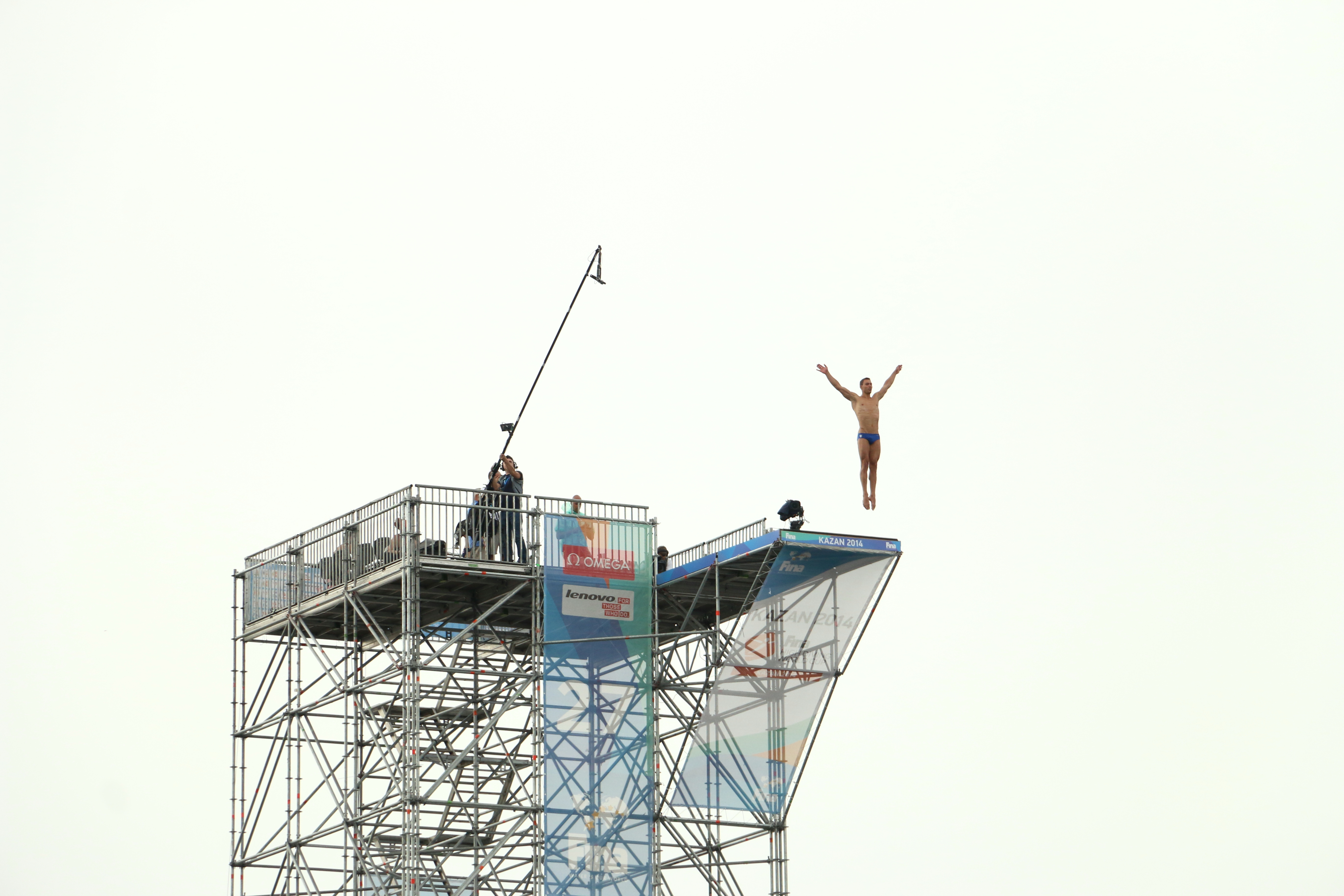
High diving tower

High diving at the 2015 World Aquatics Championships was held between 3 and 5 August 2015 in Kazan, Russia.

== Schedule ==
Two events were held.

All time are local (UTC+3).

Date	Time	Event
3 August 2015	14:00	Men Rounds 1–3
4 August 2015	14:00	Women Rounds 1–3
5 August 2015	14:00	Men Rounds 4–5

== Medal summary ==
=== Medal table ===
Rank	Nation	Gold	Silver	Bronze	Total
1	United States	1	1	0	2
2	Great Britain	1	0	0	1
3	Mexico	0	1	0	1
4	Belarus	0	0	1	1
4	Russia	0	0	1	1
Totals (5 entries)		2	2	2	6

=== Medal events ===
Event	Gold		Silver		Bronze	
Men	Gary Hunt; Great Britain	629.30 CR	Jonathan Paredes; Mexico	596.45	Artem Silchenko; Russia	593.95
Women	Rachelle Simpson; United States	258.70	Cesilie Carlton; United States	237.35	Yana Nestsiarava; Belarus	233.10
