= Diving at the 2015 World Aquatics Championships – Women's synchronized 10 metre platform =

Women's synchronized 10 metre platform at the 2015 World Aquatics Championships
- Dates: 27 July
- Competitors: 32 from 16 nations
- Winning points: 359.52

Medalists
gold medal	Chen Ruolin; Liu Huixia	China
silver medal	Meaghan Benfeito; Roseline Filion	Canada
bronze medal	Kim Un-hyang; Song Nam-hyang	North Korea

The Women's synchronized 10 metre platform competition of the diving events at the 2015 World Aquatics Championships was held on 27 July 2015.

== Results ==
The preliminary round was held at 10:00. The final was held at 19:30.

Green denotes finalists

Rank	Nation	Divers	Preliminary		Final	
Rank	Nation	Divers	Points	Rank	Points	Rank
1st place, gold medalist(s)	China	Chen Ruolin; Liu Huixia	330.24	1	359.52	1
2nd place, silver medalist(s)	Canada	Meaghan Benfeito; Roseline Filion	313.26	2	339.99	2
3rd place, bronze medalist(s)	North Korea	Kim Un-hyang; Song Nam-hyang	301.44	5	325.26	3
4	Mexico	Paola Espinosa; Alejandra Orozco	285.57	8	310.77	4
5	Russia	Ekaterina Petukhova; Yulia Timoshinina	274.80	11	310.68	5
6	Great Britain	Sarah Barrow; Tonia Couch	302.52	4	308.40	6
7	Malaysia	Pandelela Rinong; Leong Mun Yee	311.04	3	303.60	7
8	Australia	Lara Tarvit; Melissa Wu	294.84	6	302.22	8
9	United States	Amy Cozad; Jessica Parratto	285.66	7	295.86	9
10	Germany	Tina Punzel; Christina Wassen	278.70	10	285.00	10
11	Ukraine	Hanna Krasnoshlyk; Vlada Tatsenko	279.06	9	283.20	11
12	South Korea	Kim Su-ji; Ko Eun-ji	273.42	12	271.11	12
13	Hungary	Villő Kormos; Zsófia Reisinger	261.30	13		
14	Cuba	Yaima Mena; Annia Rivera	257.58	14		
15	Brazil	Ingrid Oliveira; Giovanna Pedroso	256.32	15		
16	Singapore	Lee Myra Jia Wen; Lim Shen-Yan Freida	244.32	16		
