= North Korea at the 2015 World Aquatics Championships =

- Flag of North Korea
- FINA code: PRK
- National federation: North Korean Aquatics Federation

in Kazan, Russia
- Competitors: 18 in 3 sports
- Medals Ranked 14th: Gold 1 Silver 0 Bronze 1 Total 2

World Aquatics Championships appearances
- 1973; 1975; 1978; 1982; 1986; 1991; 1994; 1998; 2001; 2003; 2005; 2007; 2009; 2011; 2013; 2015; 2017; 2019; 2022; 2023; 2024

North Korea competed at the 2015 World Aquatics Championships in Kazan, Russia from 24 July to 9 August 2015.

== Medalists ==
Medal	Name	Sport	Event	Date
Gold	Kim Kuk-hyang	Diving	Women's 10 m platform	July 30
Bronze	Kim Un-hyang; Song Nam-hyang	Diving	Women's 10 m synchronized platform	July 27

== Diving ==
North Korean divers qualified for the individual spots at the World Championships.

Men

Athlete	Event	Preliminaries		Semifinals		Final	
Athlete	Event	Points	Rank	Points	Rank	Points	Rank
Kim Sun-bom	10 m platform	388.60	25	did not advance			
Hyon Il-myong; Kim Sun-bom	10 m synchronized platform	385.08	10 Q	—		378.18	11

Women

Athlete	Event	Preliminaries		Semifinals		Final	
Athlete	Event	Points	Rank	Points	Rank	Points	Rank
Kim Kuk-hyang	10 m platform	332.95	7 Q	379.90	3 Q	397.05	1st place, gold medalist(s)
Song Nam-hyang	10 m platform	312.65	16 Q	346.55	5 Q	315.85	10
Kim Un-hyang; Song Nam-hyang	10 m synchronized platform	301.44	5 Q	—		325.26	3rd place, bronze medalist(s)

Mixed

Athlete	Event	Final	
Athlete	Event	Points	Rank
Hyon Il-myong; Kim Kuk-hyang	10 m synchronized platform	305.52	4

== Swimming ==
North Korean swimmers have achieved qualifying standards in the following events (up to a maximum of 2 swimmers in each event at the A-standard entry time, and 1 at the B-standard):

Men

Athlete	Event	Heat		Semifinal		Final	
Athlete	Event	Time	Rank	Time	Rank	Time	Rank
Yun Chung-il	50 m breaststroke	31.00	61	did not advance			

Women

Athlete	Event	Heat		Semifinal		Final	
Athlete	Event	Time	Rank	Time	Rank	Time	Rank
Choe Su-rim	50 m butterfly	29.57	50	did not advance			
Choe Su-rim	100 m butterfly	1:08.98	63	did not advance			
Sin Jin-hui	50 m breaststroke	34.02	50	did not advance			
Sin Jin-hui	100 m breaststroke	1:14.52	51	did not advance			
Sin Jin-hui	200 m breaststroke	2:41.41	45	did not advance			

== Synchronized swimming ==
North Korea fielded a full squad of ten synchronized swimmers to compete in each of the following events.

Athlete	Event	Preliminaries		Final	
Athlete	Event	Points	Rank	Points	Rank
Kang Un-ha	Solo technical routine	80.2460	12 Q	83.0956	11
Kang Un-ha	Solo free routine	83.4333	12 Q	83.7000	12
Kang Un-ha; Kim Un-a	Duet technical routine	82.0469	13	did not advance	
Kang Un-ha; Kim Un-a	Duet free routine	83.5667	14	did not advance	
Jang Hyon-ok; Jong Na-ri; Kang Un-ha*; Kim Ju-hye; Kim Un-a*; Min Hae-yon; Ri Il-sim; Ri Ji-hyang; Ryu Mi-hyang; Yun Yu-jong	Team technical routine	81.9749	13	did not advance	
Jang Hyon-ok; Jong Na-ri; Kang Un-ha; Kim Ju-hye; Kim Un-a; Min Hae-yon; Ri Il-sim; Ri Ji-hyang; Ryu Mi-hyang; Yun Yu-jong	Free routine combination	81.7667	12 Q	82.6000	11
