= Diving at the 2015 World Aquatics Championships – Women's 10 metre platform =

Women's 10 metre platform at the 2015 World Aquatics Championships
- Dates: 29–30 July
- Competitors: 37 from 23 nations
- Winning points: 397.05

Medalists
gold medal	Kim Kuk-hyang	North Korea
silver medal	Ren Qian	China
bronze medal	Pandelela Rinong	Malaysia

The Women's 10 metre platform competition of the diving events at the 2015 World Aquatics Championships was held on 29 and 30 July 2015.

== Results ==
The preliminary round was held on 29 July at 10:00. The semifinal was held on 29 July at 15:00. The final was held on 30 July at 19:30.

Green denotes finalists

Blue denotes semifinalists

Rank	Diver	Nationality	Preliminary		Semifinal		Final	
Rank	Diver	Nationality	Points	Rank	Points	Rank	Points	Rank
1st place, gold medalist(s)	Kim Kuk-hyang	North Korea	332.95	7	379.90	3	397.05	1
2nd place, silver medalist(s)	Ren Qian	China	411.40	1	423.15	1	388.00	2
3rd place, bronze medalist(s)	Pandelela Rinong	Malaysia	363.55	3	338.10	8	385.05	3
4	Si Yajie	China	377.75	2	395.75	2	384.40	4
5	Melissa Wu	Australia	320.80	11	324.30	11	364.20	5
6	Amy Cozad	United States	345.00	5	345.40	6	361.95	6
7	Meaghan Benfeito	Canada	312.75	15	320.75	12	343.80	7
8	Tonia Couch	Great Britain	328.70	9	339.70	7	340.30	8
9	Laura Marino	France	332.80	8	349.50	4	331.20	9
10	Song Nam-hyang	North Korea	312.65	16	346.55	5	315.85	10
11	Yulia Prokopchuk	Ukraine	320.40	12	337.05	9	305.90	11
12	Noemi Batki	Italy	314.40	14	331.60	10	255.00	12
13	Roseline Filion	Canada	318.60	13	318.05	13		
14	Nur Dhabitah Sabri	Malaysia	307.15	18	316.40	14		
15	Yulia Timoshinina	Russia	327.95	10	310.25	15		
16	Minami Itahashi	Japan	344.65	6	305.30	16		
17	Paola Espinosa	Mexico	354.90	4	285.65	17		
18	Sarah Barrow	Great Britain	308.90	17	283.10	18		
19	Mara Aiacoboae	Romania	306.50	19				
20	Hanna Krasnoshlyk	Ukraine	305.15	20				
21	Jessica Parratto	United States	301.85	21				
22	Giovanna Pedroso	Brazil	301.40	22				
23	Ekaterina Petukhova	Russia	301.10	23				
24	Kim Su-ji	South Korea	295.00	24				
24	Maria Kurjo	Germany	295.00	24				
24	Elena Wassen	Germany	295.00	24				
27	Ingrid Oliveira	Brazil	291.95	27				
28	Celine van Duijn	Netherlands	287.25	28				
29	Maha Abdelsalam	Egypt	280.75	29				
30	Villő Kormos	Hungary	269.80	30				
31	Nana Sasaki	Japan	255.10	31				
32	Ko Eun-ji	South Korea	255.00	32				
33	Alejandra Estrella	Mexico	247.30	33				
34	Jaimee Gundry	South Africa	245.60	34				
35	Sara Pérez	Colombia	233.25	35				
36	Zsófia Reisinger	Hungary	228.90	36				
37	Lim Shen-Yan Freida	Singapore	191.05	37				
