= Diving at the 2014 Asian Games – Women's synchronized 10 metre platform =

Women's synchronized 10 metre platform at the 2014 Asian Games
- Venue: Munhak Park Tae-hwan Aquatics Center
- Date: 30 September 2014
- Competitors: 10 from 5 nations

Medalists
gold medal	Chen Ruolin; Liu Huixia	China
silver medal	Kim Un-hyang; Song Nam-hyang	North Korea
bronze medal	Leong Mun Yee; Pandelela Rinong	Malaysia

The women's synchronized 10 metre platform diving competition at the 2014 Asian Games in Incheon was held on 30 September at the Munhak Park Tae-hwan Aquatics Center.

== Schedule ==
All times are Korea Standard Time (UTC+09:00)

Date	Time	Event
Tuesday, 30 September 2014	14:00	Final

== Results ==
Rank	Team	Dive					Total
Rank	Team	1	2	3	4	5	Total
1st place, gold medalist(s)	China (CHN); Chen Ruolin; Liu Huixia	51.60	53.40	78.30	77.76	85.44	346.50
2nd place, silver medalist(s)	North Korea (PRK); Kim Un-hyang; Song Nam-hyang	47.40	48.60	72.00	75.84	76.80	320.64
3rd place, bronze medalist(s)	Malaysia (MAS); Leong Mun Yee; Pandelela Rinong	50.40	50.40	72.00	68.16	72.96	313.92
4	Japan (JPN); Minami Itahashi; Fuka Tatsumi	47.40	45.60	60.90	69.12	61.20	284.22
5	South Korea (KOR); Cho Eun-bi; Kim Su-ji	47.40	48.00	63.00	57.60	59.52	275.52
