= Singapore at the 2015 World Aquatics Championships =

- Flag of Singapore
- FINA code: SIN
- National federation: Singapore Swimming Association
- Website: www.swimming.org.sg

in Kazan, Russia
- Competitors: 22 in 3 sports
- Medals Ranked 28th: Gold 0 Silver 0 Bronze 1 Total 1

World Aquatics Championships appearances
- 1973; 1975; 1978; 1982; 1986; 1991; 1994; 1998; 2001; 2003; 2005; 2007; 2009; 2011; 2013; 2015; 2017; 2019; 2022; 2023; 2024

Singapore competed at the 2015 World Aquatics Championships in Kazan, Russia from 24 July to 9 August 2015. This was the first time Singapore won a medal at the World Aquatics Championship, with Joseph Schooling winning bronze in the Men's 100 m butterfly event.

== Medalists ==
Medal	Name	Sport	Event	Date
Bronze	Joseph Schooling	Swimming	Men's 100 m butterfly	8 August

== Diving ==
Singaporean divers qualified for the individual spots and synchronized teams at the World Championships.

Women

Athlete	Event	Preliminaries		Semifinals		Final	
Athlete	Event	Points	Rank	Points	Rank	Points	Rank
Fong Kay Yian	3 m springboard	206.20	44	did not advance			
Freida Lim	10 m platform	191.05	37	did not advance			
Myra Lee; Freida Lim	10 m synchronized platform	244.32	16	—		did not advance	

== Swimming ==
Singaporean swimmers have achieved qualifying standards in the following events (up to a maximum of 2 swimmers in each event at the A-standard entry time, and 1 at the B-standard): Swimmers must qualify at the 2015 Singapore Championships and Southeast Asian Games (for pool events) to confirm their places for the Worlds.

The Singaporean team consists of 11 swimmers (five men and six women), all coached by former Spanish breaststroker and 1988 Olympic bronze medalist Sergio Lopez Miro. Among the official roster featured U.S.-based swimmer and Asian Games champion Joseph Schooling and Olympic siblings Quah Zheng Wen and Quah Ting Wen.

Men

Athlete	Event	Heat		Semifinal		Final	
Athlete	Event	Time	Rank	Time	Rank	Time	Rank
Lionel Khoo	50 m breaststroke	28.87	46	did not advance			
Pang Sheng Jun	400 m individual medley	4:29.61	38	—		did not advance	
Quah Zheng Wen	100 m freestyle	49.99	39	did not advance			
Quah Zheng Wen	50 m backstroke	25.44	20	did not advance			
Quah Zheng Wen	100 m backstroke	54.40 NR	21	did not advance			
Quah Zheng Wen	200 m butterfly	1:59.32	21	did not advance			
Joseph Schooling	50 m butterfly	23.40 NR	5 Q	23.27 AS	7 Q	23.25 AS	7
Joseph Schooling	100 m butterfly	51.65 NR	5 Q	51.40 NR	7 Q	50.96 AS	3rd place, bronze medalist(s)
Joseph Schooling	200 m butterfly	1:56.85	13 Q	1:56.11	10	did not advance	
Danny Yeo	200 m freestyle	1:51.29	49	did not advance			
Danny Yeo	400 m freestyle	3:57.44	50	—		did not advance	
Quah Zheng Wen; Danny Yeo; Pang Sheng Jun; Lionel Khoo	4 × 100 m freestyle relay	3:27.01	28	—		did not advance	
Lionel Khoo; Quah Zheng Wen; Joseph Schooling; Danny Yeo	4 × 100 m medley relay	3:40.93	19	—		did not advance	

Women

Athlete	Event	Heat		Semifinal		Final	
Athlete	Event	Time	Rank	Time	Rank	Time	Rank
Roanne Ho	50 m breaststroke	32.20	38	did not advance			
Quah Ting Wen	50 m freestyle	26.51	53	did not advance			
Quah Ting Wen	100 m freestyle	56.84	43	did not advance			
Quah Ting Wen	200 m freestyle	2:02.13	38	did not advance			
Quah Ting Wen	50 m butterfly	27.58	37	did not advance			
Quah Ting Wen	100 m butterfly	1:00.30	36	did not advance			
Quah Ting Wen	200 m butterfly	2:14.93	29	did not advance			
Rachel Tseng	400 m freestyle	4:19.97	33	—		did not advance	
Rachel Tseng	800 m freestyle	9:01.19	34	—		did not advance	
Rachel Tseng	1500 m freestyle	17:26.53	23	—		did not advance	
Samantha Yeo	200 m breaststroke	2:33.85	36	did not advance			
Amanda Lim; Quah Ting Wen; Marina Chan; Rachel Tseng	4 × 100 m freestyle relay	3:51.10	18	—		did not advance	
Quah Ting Wen; Amanda Lim; Marina Chan; Rachel Tseng	4 × 200 m freestyle relay	8:24.60	18	—		did not advance	
Quah Ting Wen; Samantha Yeo; Amanda Lim; Marina Chan	4 × 100 m medley relay	4:17.26	23	—		did not advance	

Mixed

Athlete	Event	Heat		Final	
Athlete	Event	Time	Rank	Time	Rank
Danny Yeo; Amanda Lim; Quah Ting Wen; Quah Zheng Wen	4 × 100 m freestyle relay	3:34.58	13	did not advance	
Quah Zheng Wen; Roanne Ho; Quah Ting Wen; Danny Yeo	4 × 100 m medley relay	3:57.51	13	did not advance	

== Synchronized swimming ==
Singapore fielded a full squad of eight synchronized swimmers to compete in each of the following events.

Athlete	Event	Preliminaries		Final	
Athlete	Event	Points	Rank	Points	Rank
Stephanie Chen; Debbie Soh	Duet technical routine	71.6715	29	did not advance	
Carolyn Buckle; Natalie Chen; Stephanie Chen; Gwyneth Goh; Nadine Khor; Shona Lim; Debbie Soh; Miya Yong	Team technical routine	71.5776	19	did not advance	
