= Diving at the 2015 World Aquatics Championships – Men's synchronized 3 metre springboard =

Men's synchronized 3 metre springboard at the 2015 World Aquatics Championships
- Dates: 28 July
- Competitors: 46 from 23 nations
- Winning points: 471.45

Medalists
gold medal	Cao Yuan; Qin Kai	China
silver medal	Evgeny Kuznetsov; Ilya Zakharov	Russia
bronze medal	Jack Laugher; Chris Mears	Great Britain

The Men's synchronized 3 metre springboard competition of the diving events at the 2015 World Aquatics Championships was held on 28 July 2015.

== Results ==
The preliminary round was held at 10:00. The final was held at 19:30.

(Green denotes finalists)

Rank	Nation	Divers	Preliminary		Final	
Rank	Nation	Divers	Points	Rank	Points	Rank
1st place, gold medalist(s)	China	Cao Yuan; Qin Kai	434.43	2	471.45	1
2nd place, silver medalist(s)	Russia	Evgeny Kuznetsov; Ilya Zakharov	448.68	1	459.18	2
3rd place, bronze medalist(s)	Great Britain	Jack Laugher; Chris Mears	417.33	4	445.20	3
4	Ukraine	Oleksandr Horshkovozov; Illya Kvasha	397.98	8	436.53	4
5	Canada	Philippe Gagné; François Imbeau-Dulac	373.59	12	408.66	5
6	Germany	Stephan Feck; Patrick Hausding	410.85	6	406.80	6
7	United States	Sam Dorman; Kristian Ipsen	404.13	7	405.99	7
8	Mexico	Jahir Ocampo; Rommel Pacheco	422.25	3	405.21	8
9	Italy	Andrea Chiarabini; Giovanni Tocci	412.17	5	402.00	9
10	Malaysia	Ahmad Azman; Ooi Tze Liang	374.97	11	401.37	10
11	Japan	Sho Sakai; Ken Terauchi	394.50	9	389.94	11
12	Australia	James Connor; Grant Nel	384.87	10	387.69	12
13	Poland	Kacper Lesiak; Andrzej Rzeszutek	370.08	13		
13	Brazil	Ian Matos; Luiz Outerelo	370.08	13		
15	South Korea	Kim Yeong-nam; Woo Ha-ram	368.88	15		
16	Colombia	Sebastián Morales; Sebastián Villa	362.19	16		
17	Spain	Nicolás García; Héctor García	360.03	17		
18	Norway	Filip Devor; Daniel Jensen	338.31	18		
19	Chile	Diego Carquin; Donato Neglia	332.94	19		
20	Egypt	Emadeldin Abdellatif; Youssef Ezzat	320.13	20		
