= Timakov =

Timakov (Russian: Тимаков) is a Russian masculine surname originating from the given name Timofey, its feminine counterpart is Timakova. It may refer to the following notable people:

- Natalya Timakova (born 1975), Russian journalist
- Vladislav Timakov (1993−2015), Russian water polo player
