= Swimming at the 2015 World Aquatics Championships – Women's 100 metre freestyle =

Women's 100 metre freestyle at the 2015 World Aquatics Championships
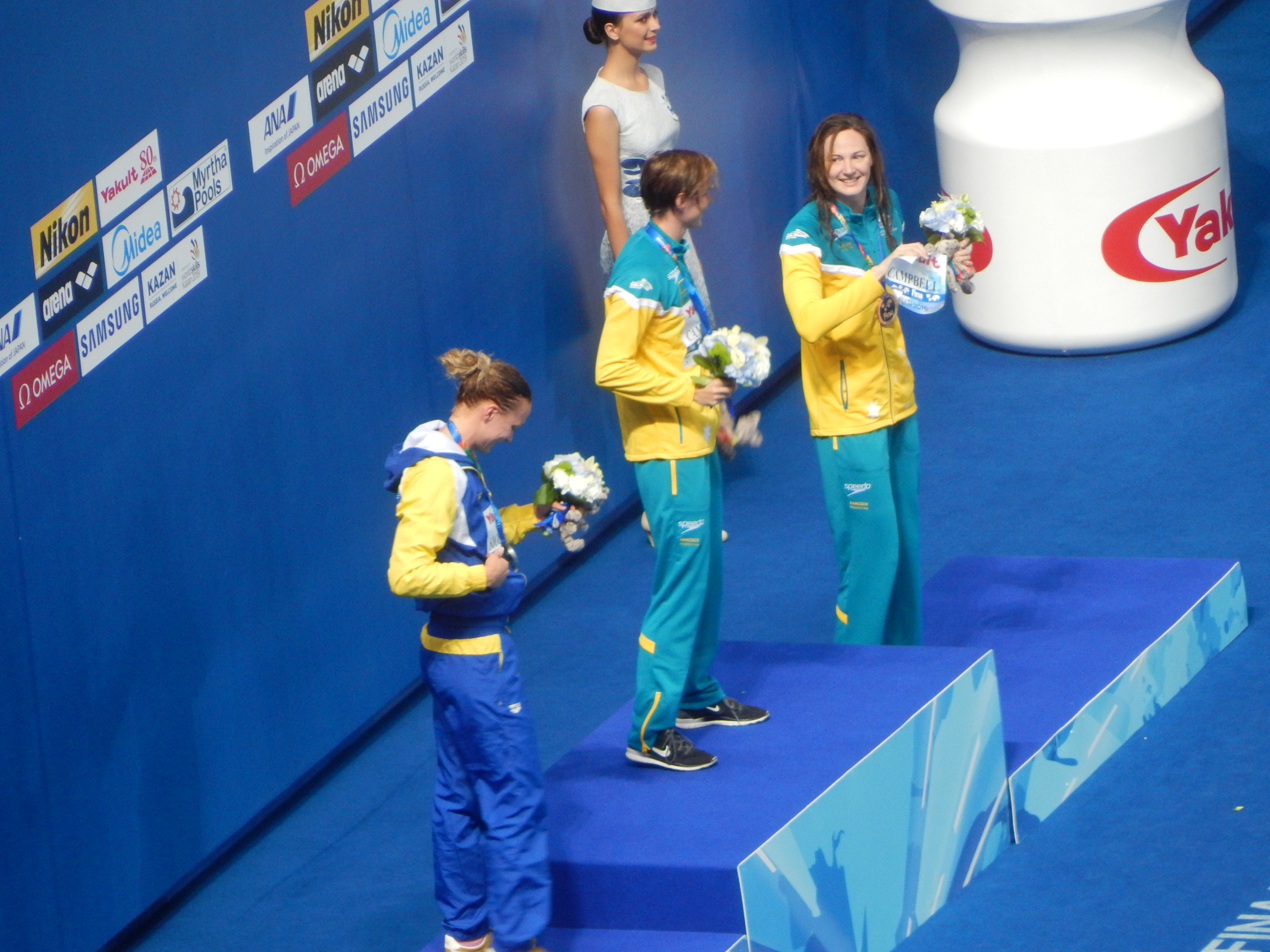
- Victory Ceremony
- Dates: 6 August (heats and semifinals); 7 August (final)
- Competitors: 90 from 80 nations
- Winning time: 52.52

Medalists
gold medal	Bronte Campbell	Australia
silver medal	Sarah Sjöström	Sweden
bronze medal	Cate Campbell	Australia

The Women's 100 metre freestyle competition of the swimming events at the 2015 World Aquatics Championships was held on 6 August with the heats and the semifinals and 7 August with the final.

== Records ==
Prior to the competition, the existing world and championship records were as follows.

World record	Britta Steffen (GER)	52.07	Rome, Italy	31 July 2009
Competition record	Britta Steffen (GER)	52.07	Rome, Italy	31 July 2009

== Results ==
=== Heats ===
The heats were held at 09:30.

Rank	Heat	Lane	Name	Nationality	Time	Notes
1	9	4	Sarah Sjöström	Sweden	53.22	Q
1	10	4	Cate Campbell	Australia	53.22	Q
3	10	5	Bronte Campbell	Australia	53.50	Q
4	10	3	Ranomi Kromowidjojo	Netherlands	53.85	Q
5	8	4	Femke Heemskerk	Netherlands	53.89	Q
6	8	3	Shen Duo	China	53.93	Q
7	9	5	Simone Manuel	United States	53.99	Q
8	10	6	Charlotte Bonnet	France	54.01	Q
9	9	3	Michelle Coleman	Sweden	54.10	Q
10	8	5	Missy Franklin	United States	54.22	Q
10	8	2	Miki Uchida	Japan	54.22	Q
12	9	8	Zhu Menghui	China	54.41	Q
13	10	1	Chantal van Landeghem	Canada	54.54	Q
14	9	2	Nataliya Lovtsova	Russia	54.68	Q
15	10	2	Pernille Blume	Denmark	54.72	Q
16	9	7	Aliaksandra Herasimenia	Belarus	54.90	Q
16	9	6	Veronika Popova	Russia	54.90	
18	8	8	Siobhán Haughey	Hong Kong	54.95	
19	10	0	Larissa Oliveira	Brazil	55.02	
20	10	7	Michelle Williams	Canada	55.08	
21	8	6	Béryl Gastaldello	France	55.11	
22	8	7	Erika Ferraioli	Italy	55.12	
23	10	9	Nina Rangelova	Bulgaria	55.22	
24	9	9	Katarzyna Wilk	Poland	55.24	
25	6	5	Anna Kolářová	Czech Republic	55.26	
26	7	7	Farida Osman	Egypt	55.46	
27	7	6	Cecilie Johannessen	Norway	55.51	
28	7	4	Julie Meynen	Luxembourg	55.54	
29	7	0	Miroslava Syllabová	Slovakia	55.60	
30	7	3	Hanna-Maria Seppälä	Finland	55.65	
31	7	2	Kimberly Buys	Belgium	55.66	
32	9	1	Yayoi Matsumoto	Japan	55.71	
33	8	0	Annika Bruhn	Germany	55.75	
34	9	0	Graciele Herrmann	Brazil	55.80	
35	6	2	Anastasia Bogdanovski	North Macedonia	56.12	
36	7	1	Nastja Govejšek	Slovenia	56.19	
37	7	8	Sasha Touretski	Switzerland	56.20	
38	8	9	Theodora Giareni	Greece	56.24	
39	6	6	Jasmine Al-Khaldi	Philippines	56.40	
39	7	5	Birgit Koschischek	Austria	56.40	
41	7	9	Isabella Arcila	Colombia	56.41	
42	6	8	Ekaterina Avramova	Turkey	56.51	
43	5	4	Zohar Shikler	Israel	56.84	
43	6	4	Quah Ting Wen	Singapore	56.84	
45	6	3	Bryndis Hansen	Iceland	56.87	
46	6	1	Natthanan Junkrajang	Thailand	56.95	
47	6	7	Miroslava Najdanovski	Serbia	57.34	
48	5	3	Chinyere Pigot	Suriname	57.36	
49	6	0	Elisbet Gámez	Cuba	57.52	
50	5	9	Bayan Jumah	Syria	57.81	
51	5	1	Tracy Keith-Matchitt	Cook Islands	57.85	
52	6	9	Tess Grossmann	Estonia	57.91	
53	5	5	Karen Torrez	Bolivia	57.93	
54	5	6	Ariel Weech	Bahamas	58.07	
55	4	4	Matelita Buadromo	Fiji	58.53	
56	5	2	Chrysoula Karamanou	Cyprus	58.65	
57	5	0	Rebecca Heyliger	Bermuda	58.71	
58	3	6	Jade Howard	Zambia	58.74	
59	4	5	Shivani Kataria	India	58.76	
59	5	7	Allyson Ponson	Aruba	58.76	
61	4	0	Mónica Ramírez	Andorra	58.85	
62	4	1	Karen Riveros	Paraguay	58.95	
63	4	2	Dorian McMenemy	Dominican Republic	59.37	
64	4	6	Machiko Raheem	FINA Independent Athletes	59.50	
65	3	4	Beatrice Felici	San Marino	59.51	
66	4	9	Naomi Ruele	Botswana	59.62	
67	4	3	Faye Sultan	Kuwait	59.66	
68	4	8	Jovana Terzić	Montenegro	59.78	
69	4	7	Nicola Muscat	Malta	1:00.07	
70	3	0	Emily Muteti	Kenya	1:00.51	
71	3	5	Sofia Usher	Uruguay	1:00.64	
72	3	2	Elinah Phillip	British Virgin Islands	1:00.79	
73	3	3	Rahaf Baqleh	Jordan	1:00.81	
74	5	8	Monika Vasilyan	Armenia	1:01.07	
75	3	8	Jennifer Rizkallah	Lebanon	1:01.16	
76	3	1	Tiara Anwar	Brunei	1:01.33	
77	3	9	Samantha Roberts	Antigua and Barbuda	1:01.38	
78	2	4	Fatima Alkaramova	Azerbaijan	1:02.01	
78	3	7	Long Chi Wai	Macau	1:02.01	
80	2	3	Nikol Merizaj	Albania	1:02.19	
81	2	6	Gaurika Singh	Nepal	1:03.23	
82	2	5	Enkhkhuslen Batbayar	Mongolia	1:05.15	
83	2	7	Colleen Furgeson	Marshall Islands	1:05.18	
84	2	8	Charissa Panuve	Tonga	1:05.65	
85	2	2	Merjen Saryyeva	Turkmenistan	1:05.85	
86	1	5	Magdalena Moshi	Tanzania	1:06.47	
87	2	9	Zahra Pinto	Malawi	1:07.32	
88	2	1	Aminath Shajan	Maldives	1:07.51	
89	2	0	Karina Klimyk	Tajikistan	1:09.71	
90	1	4	Elsie Uwamahoro	Burundi	1:18.50	
	1	3	Teona Bostashvili	Georgia		DNS
	8	1	Federica Pellegrini	Italy		DNS
	10	8	Katinka Hosszú	Hungary		DNS

=== Semifinals ===
The semifinals were held at 17:32.

==== Semifinal 1 ====
Rank	Lane	Name	Nationality	Time	Notes
1	4	Cate Campbell	Australia	52.84	Q
2	5	Ranomi Kromowidjojo	Netherlands	53.78	Q
3	3	Shen Duo	China	53.91	Q
4	2	Missy Franklin	United States	53.92	Q
5	6	Charlotte Bonnet	France	54.15	
6	1	Nataliya Lovtsova	Russia	54.44	
7	8	Aleksandra Gerasimenya	Belarus	54.68	
8	7	Zhu Menghui	China	54.77	

==== Semifinal 2 ====
Rank	Lane	Name	Nationality	Time	Notes
1	4	Sarah Sjöström	Sweden	52.78	Q
2	5	Bronte Campbell	Australia	53.00	Q
3	3	Femke Heemskerk	Netherlands	53.38	Q
4	6	Simone Manuel	United States	53.81	Q
5	1	Chantal van Landeghem	Canada	53.93	
6	2	Michelle Coleman	Sweden	54.22	
7	7	Miki Uchida	Japan	54.30	
8	8	Pernille Blume	Denmark	54.60	

=== Final ===
The final was held on 7 August at 17:32.

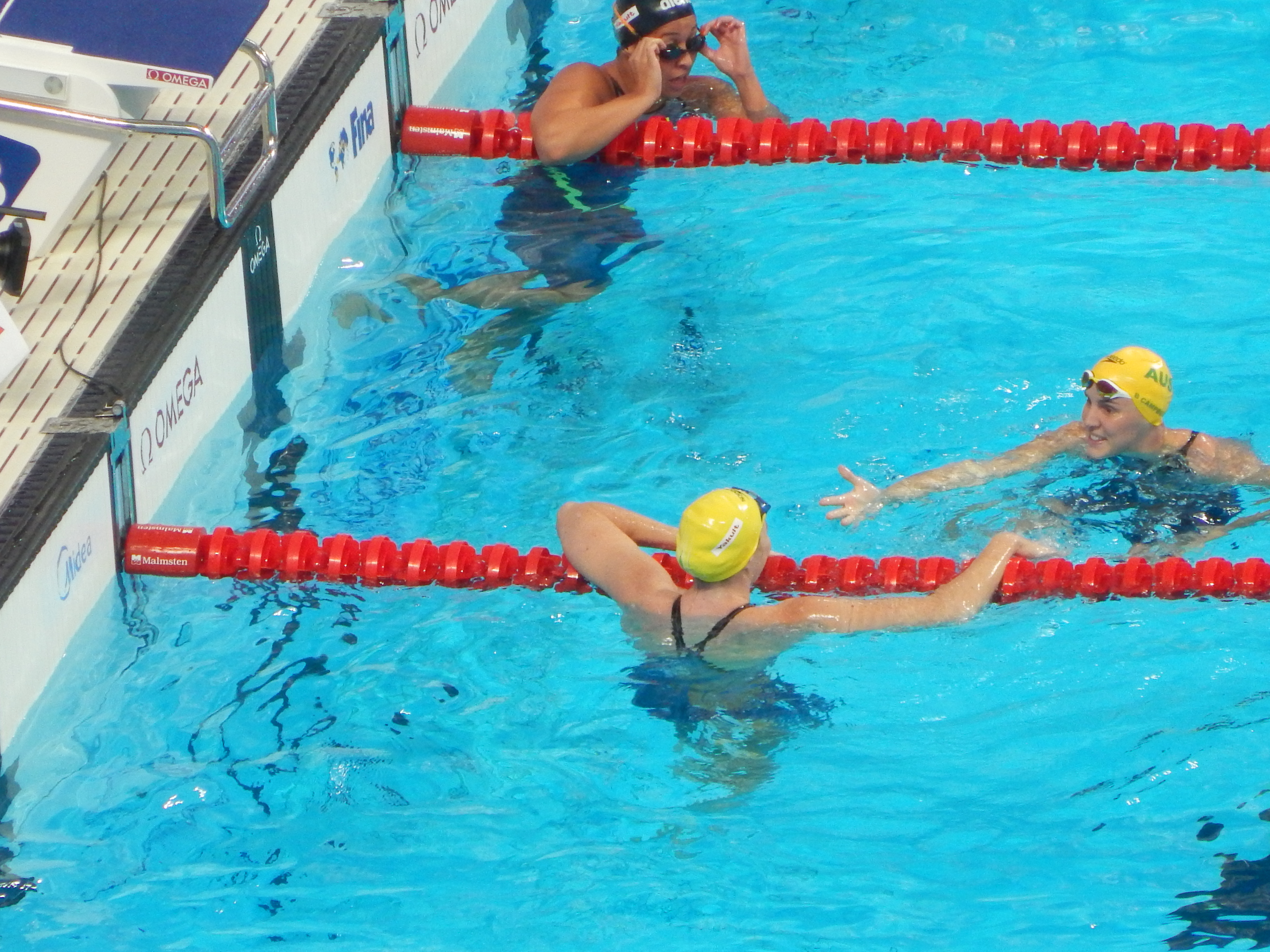
Cate and Bronte Campbell after finish

Rank	Lane	Name	Nationality	Time	Notes
1st place, gold medalist(s)	3	Bronte Campbell	Australia	52.52	
2nd place, silver medalist(s)	4	Sarah Sjöström	Sweden	52.70	
3rd place, bronze medalist(s)	5	Cate Campbell	Australia	52.82	
4	2	Ranomi Kromowidjojo	Netherlands	53.17	
5	6	Femke Heemskerk	Netherlands	53.58	
6	7	Simone Manuel	United States	53.93	
7	8	Missy Franklin	United States	54.00	
8	1	Shen Duo	China	54.76	
