= Russia at the 2015 World Aquatics Championships =

- Flag of Russia
- FINA code: RUS
- National federation: All Russian Swimming Federation
- Website: www.russwimming.ru

in Kazan, Russia
- Competitors: 97 in 6 sports
- Medals Ranked 3rd: Gold 9 Silver 4 Bronze 4 Total 17

World Aquatics Championships appearances
- 1994; 1998; 2001; 2003; 2005; 2007; 2009; 2011; 2013; 2015; 2017; 2019; 2022–2023; 2024

Other related appearances
- Soviet Union (1973–1991)

Russia competed as the host nation at the 2015 World Aquatics Championships in Kazan from 24 July to 9 August 2015.

== Medalists ==
Medal	Name	Sport	Event	Date
Gold	Svetlana Romashina	Synchronized swimming	Solo technical routine	July 25
Gold	Natalia Ishchenko; Svetlana Romashina	Synchronized swimming	Duet technical routine	July 26
Gold	Vlada Chigireva; Mikhaela Kalancha*; Svetlana Kolesnichenko; Liliia Nizamova*; Aleksandra Patskevich; Elena Prokofyeva; Alla Shishkina; Maria Shurochkina; Angelika Timanina; Gelena Topilina	Synchronized swimming	Team technical routine	July 27
Gold	Natalia Ishchenko	Synchronized swimming	Solo free routine	July 29
Gold	Aleksandr Maltsev; Darina Valitova	Synchronized swimming	Mixed duet free routine	July 30
Gold	Natalia Ishchenko; Svetlana Romashina	Synchronized swimming	Duet free routine	July 30
Gold	Vlada Chigireva; Svetlana Kolesnichenko; Liliia Nizamova*; Aleksandra Patskevich; Elena Prokofyeva; Alla Shishkina; Maria Shurochkina; Angelika Timanina; Gelena Topilina; Darina Valitova*	Synchronized swimming	Team free routine	July 31
Gold	Vlada Chigireva; Mikhaela Kalancha; Svetlana Kolesnichenko; Liliia Nizamova; Aleksandra Patskevich; Elena Prokofyeva; Svetlana Romashina*; Alla Shishkina; Maria Shurochkina; Angelika Timanina; Gelena Topilina; Darina Valitova*	Synchronized swimming	Free routine combination	August 1
Gold	Yuliya Yefimova	Swimming	Women's 100 m breaststroke	August 4
Silver	Aleksandr Maltsev; Darina Valitova	Synchronized swimming	Mixed duet technical routine	July 26
Silver	Evgeny Kuznetsov; Ilya Zakharov	Diving	Men's 3 m synchronized springboard	July 28
Silver	Ilya Zakharov	Diving	Men's 3 m springboard	July 31
Silver	Andrey Grechin; Danila Izotov*; Nikita Lobintsev; Vladimir Morozov; Alexander Sukhorukov	Swimming	Men's 4 × 100 m freestyle relay	August 2
Bronze	Roman Izmailov; Viktor Minibaev	Diving	Men's 10 m synchronized platform	July 26
Bronze	Artem Silchenko	High diving	Men's high diving	August 5
Bronze	Evgeny Rylov	Swimming	Men's 200 m backstroke	August 7
Bronze	Yuliya Yefimova	Swimming	Women's 50 m breaststroke	August 9

== Diving ==
Russian divers qualified for the individual spots and the synchronized teams at the Worlds through the National Championships.

Men

Athlete	Event	Preliminaries		Semifinals		Final	
Athlete	Event	Points	Rank	Points	Rank	Points	Rank
Ilya Molchanov	1 m springboard	343.05	17	—		Did not advance	
Evgeny Novoselov	1 m springboard	337.15	18	—		Did not advance	
Evgeny Kuznetsov	3 m springboard	470.15	5 Q	499.80	4 Q	516.90	5
Ilya Zakharov	3 m springboard	474.00	4 Q	524.30	3 Q	547.60	2nd place, silver medalist(s)
Viktor Minibaev	10 m platform	518.95	2 Q	510.95	4 Q	486.40	6
Nikita Shleikher	10 m platform	466.75	8 Q	468.95	9 Q	482.70	7
Evgeny Kuznetsov; Ilya Zakharov	3 m synchronized springboard	448.68	1 Q	—		459.18	2nd place, silver medalist(s)
Roman Izmailov; Viktor Minibaev	10 m synchronized platform	443.07	3 Q	—		441.33	3rd place, bronze medalist(s)

Women

Athlete	Event	Preliminaries		Semifinals		Final	
Athlete	Event	Points	Rank	Points	Rank	Points	Rank
Nadezhda Bazhina	1 m springboard	252.05	8 Q	—		273.45	6
Maria Polyakova	1 m springboard	275.15	5 Q	—		255.20	9
Nadezhda Bazhina	3 m springboard	283.90	17 Q	291.30	13	Did not advance	
Kristina Ilinykh	3 m springboard	267.90	20	Did not advance			
Yekaterina Petukhova	10 m platform	301.10	23	Did not advance			
Yulia Timoshinina	10 m platform	327.95	10 Q	310.25	15	Did not advance	
Nadezhda Bazhina; Kristina Ilinykh	3 m synchronized springboard	282.60	5 Q	—		297.30	6
Yekaterina Petukhova; Yulia Timoshinina	10 m synchronized platform	274.80	11 Q	—		310.68	5

Mixed

Athlete	Event	Final	
Athlete	Event	Points	Rank
Ilya Molchanov; Maria Polyakova	3 m synchronized springboard	306.27	6
Nikita Shleikher; Yulia Timoshinina	10 m synchronized platform	304.14	5
Viktor Minibaev; Nadezhda Bazhina	Team	418.50	4

== High diving ==
Russia has qualified one high diver at the World Championships.

Athlete	Event	Points	Rank
Igor Semashko	Men's high diving	366.30	15
Ilya Shchurov	Men's high diving	309.85	19
Artem Silchenko	Men's high diving	593.95	3rd place, bronze medalist(s)

== Open water swimming ==
Russia fielded a full team of eight swimmers to compete in the open water marathon.

Men

Athlete	Event	Time	Rank
Kirill Abrosimov	10 km	1:51:37.1	33
Sergey Bolshakov	5 km	55:25.3	12
Evgeny Drattsev	5 km	55:20.4	4
Evgeny Drattsev	25 km	4:57:11.9	8
Roman Karyakin	25 km	5:15:53.8	21
Daniil Serebrennikov	10 km	1:53:11.9	43

Women

Athlete	Event	Time	Rank
Anastasiya Azarova	5 km	59:19.8	14
Anastasiya Azarova	10 km	2:05:59.4	40
Olga Kozydub	25 km	5:22:46.1	11
Anastasiya Krapyvina	5 km	59:12.7	8
Anastasiya Krapyvina	10 km	1:58:28.6	5

Mixed

Athlete	Event	Time	Rank
Sergey Bolshakov; Anastasiya Krapyavina; Daniil Serebrennikov	Team	56:47.0	10

== Swimming ==
Russian swimmers have achieved qualifying standards in the following events (up to a maximum of 2 swimmers in each event at the A-standard entry time, and 1 at the B-standard): Swimmers must qualify at the 2015 Russian Championships in Moscow (for pool events) to confirm their places for the Worlds.

The Russian team consists of 37 swimmers (22 men and 15 women). Among the official roster featured sprint freestyle sensation Vladimir Morozov, 2012 Olympic silver medalist Anastasia Zuyeva, and two-time defending World champion Yuliya Yefimova.

Men

Athlete	Event	Heat		Semifinal		Final	
Athlete	Event	Time	Rank	Time	Rank	Time	Rank
Anton Chupkov	200 m breaststroke	2:09.97	8 Q	2:09.64	8 Q	2:09.96	7
Andrey Grechin	50 m freestyle	22.38	13 Q	22.66	16	Did not advance	
Danila Izotov	200 m freestyle	1:46.65	6 Q	1:47.66	15	Did not advance	
Ilya Khomenko	200 m breaststroke	2:10.13	9 Q	2:09.86	9	Did not advance	
Evgeny Koptelov	100 m butterfly	52.38	20	Did not advance			
Evgeny Koptelov	200 m butterfly	1:58.06	19	Did not advance			
Alexander Krasnykh	200 m freestyle	1:46.91	9 Q	1:46.45	8 Q	1:46.88	7
Alexander Krasnykh	400 m freestyle	3:51.93	34	—		Did not advance	
Alexander Kudashev	200 m butterfly	1:59.33	26	Did not advance			
Semen Makovich	200 m individual medley	2:01.05	20	Did not advance			
Semen Makovich	400 m individual medley	4:18.61	17	—		Did not advance	
Ernest Maksumov	800 m freestyle	8:12.65	36	—		Did not advance	
Ernest Maksumov	1500 m freestyle	15:26.64	27	—		Did not advance	
Vladimir Morozov	50 m freestyle	21.97	4 Q	22.02	=8 Q	21.56	4
Vladimir Morozov	100 m freestyle	48.46	3 Q	DSQ		Did not advance	
Vladimir Morozov	50 m backstroke	25.27	=13 Q	25.77	6 Q	24.73	5
Alexander Osipenko	400 m individual medley	4:16.35	11	—		Did not advance	
Alexander Popkov	50 m butterfly	23.75	17	Did not advance			
Kirill Prigoda	50 m breaststroke	27.43	11 Q	27.47	11	Did not advance	
Kirill Prigoda	100 m breaststroke	59.81	7 Q	59.60	5 Q	59.84	7
Vyacheslav Prudnikov	100 m butterfly	52.47	22	Did not advance			
Evgeny Rylov	100 m backstroke	53.74	9 Q	53.14	5 Q	53.23	7
Evgeny Rylov	200 m backstroke	1:56.78	4 Q	1:55.54	=4 Q	1:54.60	3rd place, bronze medalist(s)
Alexander Sukhorukov	100 m freestyle	48.64	9 Q	48.40	7 Q	48.28	6
Grigory Tarasevich	50 m backstroke	25.27	=13 Q	25.42	16	Did not advance	
Grigory Tarasevich	100 m backstroke	53.69	8 Q	53.64	11	Did not advance	
Grigory Tarasevich	200 m backstroke	1:57.77	11 Q	1:58.30	16	Did not advance	
Andrey Grechin; Nikita Lobintsev; Vladimir Morozov; Alexander Sukhorukov; Danila Izotov*	4 × 100 m freestyle relay	3:12.46	1 Q	—		3:11.19	2nd place, silver medalist(s)
Danila Izotov; Alexander Krasnykh; Mikhail Dovgalyuk; Alexander Sukhorukov; Nikita Lobintsev*; Artem Lobuzov*	4 × 200 m freestyle relay	7:10.84	7 Q	—		7:06.89	4
Ilya Khomenko*; Vladimir Morozov; Daniil Pakhomov; Kirill Prigoda; Evgeny Rylov; Alexander Sukhorukov*; Grigory Tarasevich*	4 × 100 m medley relay	3:34.02	8 Q	—		3:30.90	5

Women

Athlete	Event	Heat		Semifinal		Final	
Athlete	Event	Time	Rank	Time	Rank	Time	Rank
Viktoriya Andreeva	200 m freestyle	1:58.31	=13 Q	1:58.14	14	Did not advance	
Viktoriya Andreeva	200 m individual medley	2:16.85	27	Did not advance			
Maria Astashkina	50 m breaststroke	32.18	37	Did not advance			
Maria Astashkina	100 m breaststroke	1:08.27	=26	Did not advance			
Anastasia Fesikova	50 m backstroke	28.15	=9 Q	28.11	9	Did not advance	
Anastasia Fesikova	100 m backstroke	59.84	6 Q	59.55	6 Q	59.66	6
Maria Kameneva	50 m freestyle	25.18	16 Q	24.97	15	Did not advance	
Nataliya Lovtsova	50 m freestyle	25.62	33	Did not advance			
Nataliya Lovtsova	100 m freestyle	54.68	14 Q	54.44	13	Did not advance	
Nataliya Lovtsova	50 m butterfly	27.11	34	Did not advance			
Nataliya Lovtsova	100 m butterfly	59.11	26	Did not advance			
Arina Openysheva	400 m freestyle	4:11.71	18	—		Did not advance	
Anna Polyakova	100 m butterfly	59.42	28	Did not advance			
Veronika Popova	100 m freestyle	54.90	=16	Did not advance			
Veronika Popova	200 m freestyle	1:57.18	5 Q	1:56.56	5 Q	1:56.16	4
Irina Prikhodko	200 m backstroke	2:10.81	14 Q	2:10.36	11	Did not advance	
Valeriya Salamantina	800 m freestyle	9:11.78	37	—		Did not advance	
Vitalina Simonova	200 m breaststroke	2:23.99	8 Q	2:22.72	4 Q	2:23.59	7
Daria Ustinova	50 m backstroke	28.52	16 Q	28.39	14	Did not advance	
Daria Ustinova	100 m backstroke	1:01.00	22	Did not advance			
Daria Ustinova	200 m backstroke	2:09.16	4 Q	2:08.74	5 Q	2:07.64 WJ	4
Yuliya Yefimova	50 m breaststroke	30.45	5 Q	30.14	2 Q	30.13	3rd place, bronze medalist(s)
Yuliya Yefimova	100 m breaststroke	1:06.31	1 Q	1:05.60	1 Q	1:05.66	1st place, gold medalist(s)
Yuliya Yefimova	200 m breaststroke	2:26.11	17	Did not advance			
Veronika Popova; Nataliya Lovtsova; Viktoriya Andreeva; Maria Kameneva	4 × 100 m freestyle relay	3:38.63	10	—		Did not advance	
Viktoriya Andreeva; Veronika Popova; Arina Openysheva; Daria Mullakaeva	4 × 200 m freestyle relay	7:55.19	9	—		Did not advance	
Nataliya Lovtsova; Veronika Popova; Vitalina Simonova; Daria Ustinova	4 × 100 m medley relay	4:01.12	10	—		Did not advance	

Mixed

Athlete	Event	Heat		Final	
Athlete	Event	Time	Rank	Time	Rank
Vladimir Morozov; Alexandr Sukhorukov; Veronika Popova; Nataliya Lovtsova; Andrey Grechin*; Nikita Lobintsev*	4 × 100 m freestyle relay	3:25.23	2 Q	3:24.21	4
Anastasia Fesikova; Yuliya Yefimova; Daniil Pakhomov; Vladimir Morozov; Daria Ustinova*; Kirill Prigoda*; Veronika Popova*	4 × 100 m medley relay	3:45.87 NR	4 Q	3:44.83 NR	5

== Synchronized swimming ==
Russia sent a full squad of twelve synchronized swimmers (one male and eleven female), including 2012 Olympic champions Natalia Ishchenko and Svetlana Romashina, to compete in each of the following events.

Women

Athlete	Event	Preliminaries		Final	
Athlete	Event	Points	Rank	Points	Rank
Svetlana Romashina	Solo technical routine	94.3860	1 Q	95.2680	1st place, gold medalist(s)
Natalia Ishchenko	Solo free routine	96.5000	1 Q	97.2333	1st place, gold medalist(s)
Natalia Ishchenko; Svetlana Romashina	Duet technical routine	94.5715	1 Q	95.4672	1st place, gold medalist(s)
Natalia Ishchenko; Svetlana Romashina	Duet free routine	97.2667	1 Q	98.2000	1st place, gold medalist(s)
Vlada Chigireva; Mikhaela Kalancha*; Svetlana Kolesnichenko; Liliia Nizamova*; Aleksandra Patskevich; Elena Prokofyeva; Alla Shishkina; Maria Shurochkina; Angelika Timanina; Gelena Topilina	Team technical routine	95.1829	1 Q	95.7457	1st place, gold medalist(s)
Vlada Chigireva; Svetlana Kolesnichenko; Liliia Nizamova*; Aleksandra Patskevich; Elena Prokofyeva; Alla Shishkina; Maria Shurochkina; Angelika Timanina; Gelena Topilina; Darina Valitova*	Team free routine	97.6333	1 Q	98.4667	1st place, gold medalist(s)
Vlada Chigireva; Mikhaela Kalancha; Svetlana Kolesnichenko; Liliia Nizamova; Aleksandra Patskevich; Elena Prokofyeva; Svetlana Romashina*; Alla Shishkina; Maria Shurochkina; Angelika Timanina; Gelena Topilina; Darina Valitova*	Free routine combination	96.4000	1 Q	98.3000	1st place, gold medalist(s)

Mixed

Athlete	Event	Preliminaries		Final	
Athlete	Event	Points	Rank	Points	Rank
Aleksandr Maltsev; Darina Valitova	Duet technical routine	88.8539	1 Q	88.2986	2nd place, silver medalist(s)
Aleksandr Maltsev; Darina Valitova	Duet free routine	89.3667	2 Q	91.7333	1st place, gold medalist(s)

== Water polo ==
=== Men's tournament ===
Team roster

- Anton Antonov
- Alexey Bugaychuk
- Artem Odintsov
- Igor Bychkov
- Albert Zinnatullin
- Artem Ashaev
- Vladislav Timakov
- Ivan Nagaev
- Konstantin Stepaniuk
- Dmitrii Kholod
- Sergey Lisunov
- Lev Magomaev
- Victor Ivanov

Group play

Pos	Team	Pld	W	D	L	GF	GA	GD	Pts	Qualification
1	Greece	3	3	0	0	37	31	+6	6	Advanced to quarterfinals
2	United States	3	2	0	1	28	26	+2	4	Advanced to playoffs
3	Italy	3	1	0	2	28	28	0	2	Advanced to playoffs
4	Russia	3	0	0	3	23	31	−8	0	

Source: SportResult.com
Rules for classification: 1) points; 2) head-to-head points; 3) head-to-head goal difference; 4) head-to-head number of goals scored; 5) goal difference.

27 July 2015; 18:50	Report	United States	7–6	Russia	Kazan; Attendance: 1,932; Referees: Boris Margeta (SLO), Daniel Flahive (AUS)
27 July 2015; 18:50	Report	Score by quarters: 3–1, 1–2, 2–2, 1–1			Kazan; Attendance: 1,932; Referees: Boris Margeta (SLO), Daniel Flahive (AUS)
27 July 2015; 18:50	Report	Azevedo, Cupido 3	Goals	Bugaychuk 3	Kazan; Attendance: 1,932; Referees: Boris Margeta (SLO), Daniel Flahive (AUS)

29 July 2015; 18:50	Report	Russia	6–9	Italy	Kazan; Attendance: 2,350; Referees: Adrian Alexandrescu (ROU), Radosław Koryzna (POL)
29 July 2015; 18:50	Report	Score by quarters: 1–1, 0–5, 3–1, 2–2			Kazan; Attendance: 2,350; Referees: Adrian Alexandrescu (ROU), Radosław Koryzna (POL)
29 July 2015; 18:50	Report	Kholod 3	Goals	Giorgetti 2	Kazan; Attendance: 2,350; Referees: Adrian Alexandrescu (ROU), Radosław Koryzna (POL)

31 July 2015; 18:50	Report	Greece	15–11	Russia	Kazan; Attendance: 2,285; Referees: Adrian Alexandrescu (ROU), Francesc Buch (ESP)
31 July 2015; 18:50	Report	Score by quarters: 5–2, 3–2, 5–3, 2–4			Kazan; Attendance: 2,285; Referees: Adrian Alexandrescu (ROU), Francesc Buch (ESP)
31 July 2015; 18:50	Report	Fountoulis 4	Goals	Nagaev 3	Kazan; Attendance: 2,285; Referees: Adrian Alexandrescu (ROU), Francesc Buch (ESP)

13th–16th place semifinals

2 August 2015; 10:50	Report	China	10–10	Russia	Kazan; Attendance: 2,263; Referees: Stanko Ivanovski (MNE), Masoud Rezvani (IRI)
2 August 2015; 10:50	Report	Score by quarters: 1–2, 4–4, 2–1, 3–3 PSO: 1–4			Kazan; Attendance: 2,263; Referees: Stanko Ivanovski (MNE), Masoud Rezvani (IRI)
2 August 2015; 10:50	Report	Tan Feihu 4	Goals	four players 2	Kazan; Attendance: 2,263; Referees: Stanko Ivanovski (MNE), Masoud Rezvani (IRI)

13th place game

4 August 2015; 10:50	Report	Russia	9–13	Japan	Kazan; Attendance: 821; Referees: György Kun (HUN), Masoud Rezvani (IRI)
4 August 2015; 10:50	Report	Score by quarters: 4–3, 1–3, 2–5, 2–2			Kazan; Attendance: 821; Referees: György Kun (HUN), Masoud Rezvani (IRI)
4 August 2015; 10:50	Report	Bychkov 3	Goals	Okawa 3	Kazan; Attendance: 821; Referees: György Kun (HUN), Masoud Rezvani (IRI)

=== Women's tournament ===
Team roster

- Anastasia Verkhoglyadova
- Tatiana Zubkova
- Ekaterina Prokofyeva
- Elvina Karimova
- Ekaterina Zubacheva
- Anastasia Simanovich
- Ekaterina Lisunova
- Evgeniia Abdriziakova
- Anna Timofeeva
- Ekaterina Tankeeva
- Evgeniya Ivanova
- Nadezhda Iarondaikina
- Anna Karnaukh

Group play

Pos	Team	Pld	W	D	L	GF	GA	GD	Pts	Qualification
1	Russia	3	2	1	0	38	25	+13	5	Advanced to quarterfinals
2	China	3	2	1	0	31	21	+10	5	Advanced to playoffs
3	Hungary	3	1	0	2	37	25	+12	2	Advanced to playoffs
4	France	3	0	0	3	12	47	−35	0	

Source: SportResult.com
Rules for classification: 1) points; 2) head-to-head points; 3) head-to-head goal difference; 4) head-to-head number of goals scored; 5) goal difference.

26 July 2015; 18:50	Report	Russia	16–5	France	Kazan; Attendance: 2,164; Referees: Peter de Jong (NED), Stephane Roy (CAN)
26 July 2015; 18:50	Report	Score by quarters: 5–1, 3–2, 4–1, 4–1			Kazan; Attendance: 2,164; Referees: Peter de Jong (NED), Stephane Roy (CAN)
26 July 2015; 18:50	Report	Karimova, Prokofyeva 3	Goals	Guillet 3	Kazan; Attendance: 2,164; Referees: Peter de Jong (NED), Stephane Roy (CAN)

28 July 2015; 18:50	Report	Hungary	11–13	Russia	Kazan; Attendance: 2,123; Referees: Nenad Peris (CRO), Joseph Peila (USA)
28 July 2015; 18:50	Report	Score by quarters: 3–1, 3–4, 4–3, 1–5			Kazan; Attendance: 2,123; Referees: Nenad Peris (CRO), Joseph Peila (USA)
28 July 2015; 18:50	Report	Keszthelyi 3	Goals	Lisunova 3	Kazan; Attendance: 2,123; Referees: Nenad Peris (CRO), Joseph Peila (USA)

30 July 2015; 18:50	Report	Russia	9–9	China	Kazan; Attendance: 2,653; Referees: Georgios Stavridis (GRE), Joseph Peila (USA)
30 July 2015; 18:50	Report	Score by quarters: 3–2, 1–2, 3–2, 2–3			Kazan; Attendance: 2,653; Referees: Georgios Stavridis (GRE), Joseph Peila (USA)
30 July 2015; 18:50	Report	Karimova, Prokofyeva 3	Goals	Niu Guannan 4	Kazan; Attendance: 2,653; Referees: Georgios Stavridis (GRE), Joseph Peila (USA)

Quarterfinals

3 August 2015; 18:50	Report	Russia	9–10	Netherlands	Kazan; Attendance: 2,319; Referees: Nenad Peris (CRO), Adrian Alexandrescu (ROU)
3 August 2015; 18:50	Report	Score by quarters: 1–4, 4–3, 2–1, 2–2			Kazan; Attendance: 2,319; Referees: Nenad Peris (CRO), Adrian Alexandrescu (ROU)
3 August 2015; 18:50	Report	Ivanova, Karimova 3	Goals	Megens, Klaassen 3	Kazan; Attendance: 2,319; Referees: Nenad Peris (CRO), Adrian Alexandrescu (ROU)

5th–8th place semifinals

5 August 2015; 17:00	Report	Greece	12–12	Russia	Kazan; Attendance: 690; Referees: Adrian Alexandrescu (ROU), György Kun (HUN)
5 August 2015; 17:00	Report	Score by quarters: 4–3, 1–4, 3–2, 4–3 PSO: 4–3			Kazan; Attendance: 690; Referees: Adrian Alexandrescu (ROU), György Kun (HUN)
5 August 2015; 17:00	Report	Roumpesi 3	Goals	Ivanova 4	Kazan; Attendance: 690; Referees: Adrian Alexandrescu (ROU), György Kun (HUN)

Seventh place game

7 August 2015; 14:00	Report	Spain	15–10	Russia	Kazan; Attendance: 1,336; Referees: Radoslaw Korzyna (POL), Nenad Peris (CRO)
7 August 2015; 14:00	Report	Score by quarters: 5–3, 3–4, 4–1, 3–2			Kazan; Attendance: 1,336; Referees: Radoslaw Korzyna (POL), Nenad Peris (CRO)
7 August 2015; 14:00	Report	Tarragó 4	Goals	Ivanova 3	Kazan; Attendance: 1,336; Referees: Radoslaw Korzyna (POL), Nenad Peris (CRO)
