= Swimming at the 2015 World Aquatics Championships – Men's 50 metre breaststroke =

Men's 50 metre breaststroke at the 2015 World Aquatics Championships
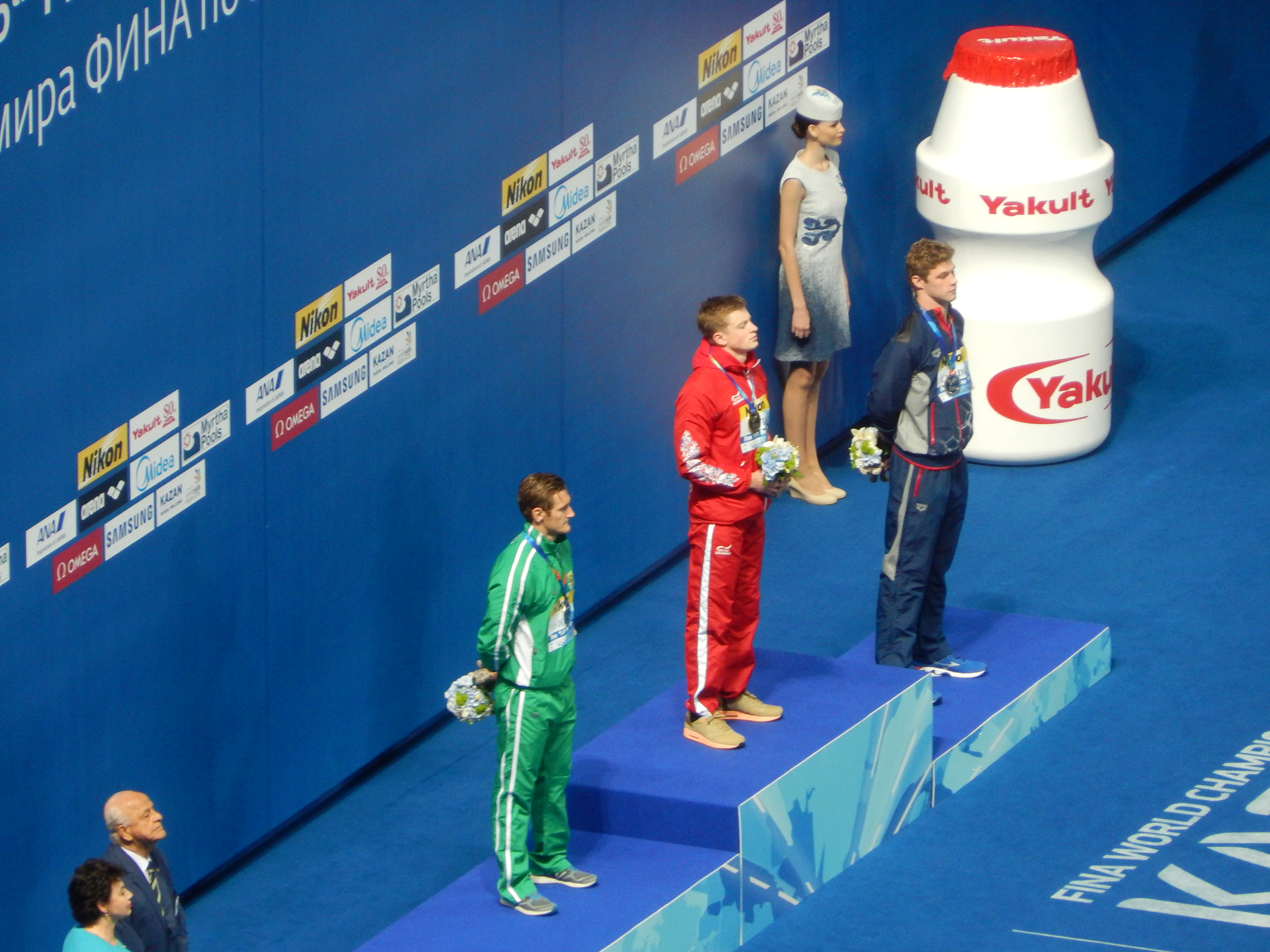
- Victory Ceremony
- Dates: 4 August 2015 (heats and semifinals); 5 August 2015(final)
- Competitors: 78 from 75 nations
- Winning time: 26.51

Medalists
gold medal	Adam Peaty	Great Britain
silver medal	Cameron van der Burgh	South Africa
bronze medal	Kevin Cordes	United States

The Men's 50 metre breaststroke competition of the swimming events at the 2015 World Aquatics Championships was held with the heats and the semifinals on 4 August 2015 and the final on 5 August 2015.

== Records ==
Prior to the competition, the existing world and championship records were as follows.

World record	Cameron van der Burgh (RSA)	26.67	Rome, Italy	29 July 2009
Competition record	Cameron van der Burgh (RSA)	26.67	Rome, Italy	29 July 2009

The following new records were set during this competition.

Date	Event	Name	Nationality	Time	Record
4 August	Heat 7	Cameron van der Burgh	South Africa	26.62	WR
4 August	Semifinal 1	Adam Peaty	Great Britain	26.42	WR

== Results ==
=== Heats ===
The heats were held at 09:30.

Rank	Heat	Lane	Name	Nationality	Time	Notes
1	7	4	Cameron van der Burgh	South Africa	26.62	Q, WR
2	9	4	Adam Peaty	Great Britain	26.68	Q
3	8	3	Damir Dugonjič	Slovenia	26.70	Q, NR
4	9	6	Kevin Cordes	United States	26.93	Q
5	8	5	Felipe França Silva	Brazil	27.10	Q
6	7	5	Čaba Silađi	Serbia	27.19	Q
7	7	7	Glenn Snyders	New Zealand	27.23	Q
8	7	3	Felipe Lima	Brazil	27.37	Q
9	8	6	Hendrik Feldwehr	Germany	27.41	Q
10	8	2	Giacomo Perez-Dortona	France	27.42	Q
11	8	1	Kirill Prigoda	Russia	27.43	Q
12	9	7	Peter Stevens	Slovenia	27.46	Q
13	8	0	Dmitriy Balandin	Kazakhstan	27.47	Q
13	9	5	Andrea Toniato	Italy	27.47	Q
15	6	3	Vladislav Mustafin	Uzbekistan	27.51	Q
15	7	6	Giedrius Titenis	Lithuania	27.51	Q
17	8	4	Christian Sprenger	Australia	27.54	
18	9	3	Brendan McHugh	United States	27.62	
19	7	1	Shi Weijia	China	27.65	
20	8	8	Richard Funk	Canada	27.71	
21	9	2	Ioannis Karpouzlis	Greece	27.85	
22	5	2	Laurent Carnol	Luxembourg	27.94	NR
23	6	7	Jorge Murillo	Colombia	27.99	
23	7	8	Sami Aaltomaa	Finland	27.99	
25	8	7	Alex Murphy	Ireland	28.00	
26	9	0	Martin Schweizer	Switzerland	28.02	
27	6	9	Youssef El-Kamash	Egypt	28.05	NR
28	7	2	Renato Prono	Paraguay	28.06	
29	6	4	Carlos Claverie	Venezuela	28.12	
30	9	1	Yasuhiro Koseki	Japan	28.13	
31	8	9	Nikolajs Maskaļenko	Latvia	28.15	
32	6	1	Marcin Stolarski	Poland	28.22	
33	9	9	Marek Botík	Slovakia	28.26	
34	6	2	Édgar Crespo	Panama	28.29	
35	6	0	Lachezar Shumkov	Bulgaria	28.36	
36	6	6	Demir Atasoy	Turkey	28.38	
37	5	5	Dávid Horváth	Hungary	28.40	
38	9	8	Petr Bartůněk	Czech Republic	28.47	
39	7	9	Martin Melconian	Uruguay	28.53	
40	6	5	Sandeep Sejwal	India	28.57	
41	5	9	Jordy Groters	Aruba	28.64	
42	5	8	Malick Fall	Senegal	28.71	
43	5	1	Dustin Tynes	Bahamas	28.74	
43	7	0	Martti Aljand	Estonia	28.74	
45	4	3	James Lawson	Zimbabwe	28.85	NR
46	5	7	Khoo Chien Yin Lionel	Singapore	28.87	
47	4	4	Chao Man Hou	Macau	28.99	
48	5	0	Markos Kalopsidiotis	Cyprus	29.08	
49	5	6	Mauro Castillo	Mexico	29.15	
50	5	3	Abdelkader Afane	Algeria	29.17	
51	4	6	Adam Allouche	Lebanon	29.45	
52	3	4	João Aguiar	Angola	29.92	
53	4	5	Julian Harding	Malta	29.93	
54	4	1	Nazih Mezayek	Jordan	29.96	
55	4	9	Alex Axiotis	Zambia	30.24	
56	4	2	Jesús Flores	Honduras	30.33	
57	4	7	Ramazan Taimatov	Kyrgyzstan	30.40	
58	3	3	Corey Ollivierre	Grenada	30.61	
59	3	6	Lum Zhaveli	Kosovo	30.95	
60	4	0	Serginni Marten	Curaçao	30.97	
61	3	5	Yun Chung-il	North Korea	31.00	
62	3	1	Kaito Yanai	Northern Mariana Islands	31.46	
63	3	2	Delgerkhuu Myagmar	Mongolia	32.07	
64	3	9	Joshua Tibatemwa	Uganda	33.00	NR
65	3	7	Hemthon Ponloeu	Cambodia	33.09	
66	3	8	Shane Cadogan	Saint Vincent and the Grenadines	33.14	
67	4	8	Dionisio Augustine	Federated States of Micronesia	33.91	
68	2	3	Moris Beale	Sierra Leone	34.87	
69	2	6	Kiran Karki	Nepal	34.94	
70	2	4	Abdelmalik Muktar	Ethiopia	35.89	
71	2	1	Alassane Seydou	Niger	36.63	
72	2	7	Ramziyor Khorkashov	Tajikistan	37.20	
73	2	2	Tano Atta	Ivory Coast	38.65	
74	1	5	Omar Barry	Burkina Faso	41.33	
75	1	4	Momodou Saine	The Gambia	41.49	
76	2	5	Ahmed Bourhan	Djibouti	42.88	
	3	0	Christian Nassif	Central African Republic		DSQ
	6	8	Joshua Hall	Philippines		DSQ
	1	3	Alhassane Fofana	Guinea		DNS
	2	8	Stephane Fokam	Cameroon		DNS
	5	4	Mubarak Al-Beshr	United Arab Emirates		DNS

=== Semifinals ===
The semifinals were held on 4 August at 17:48.

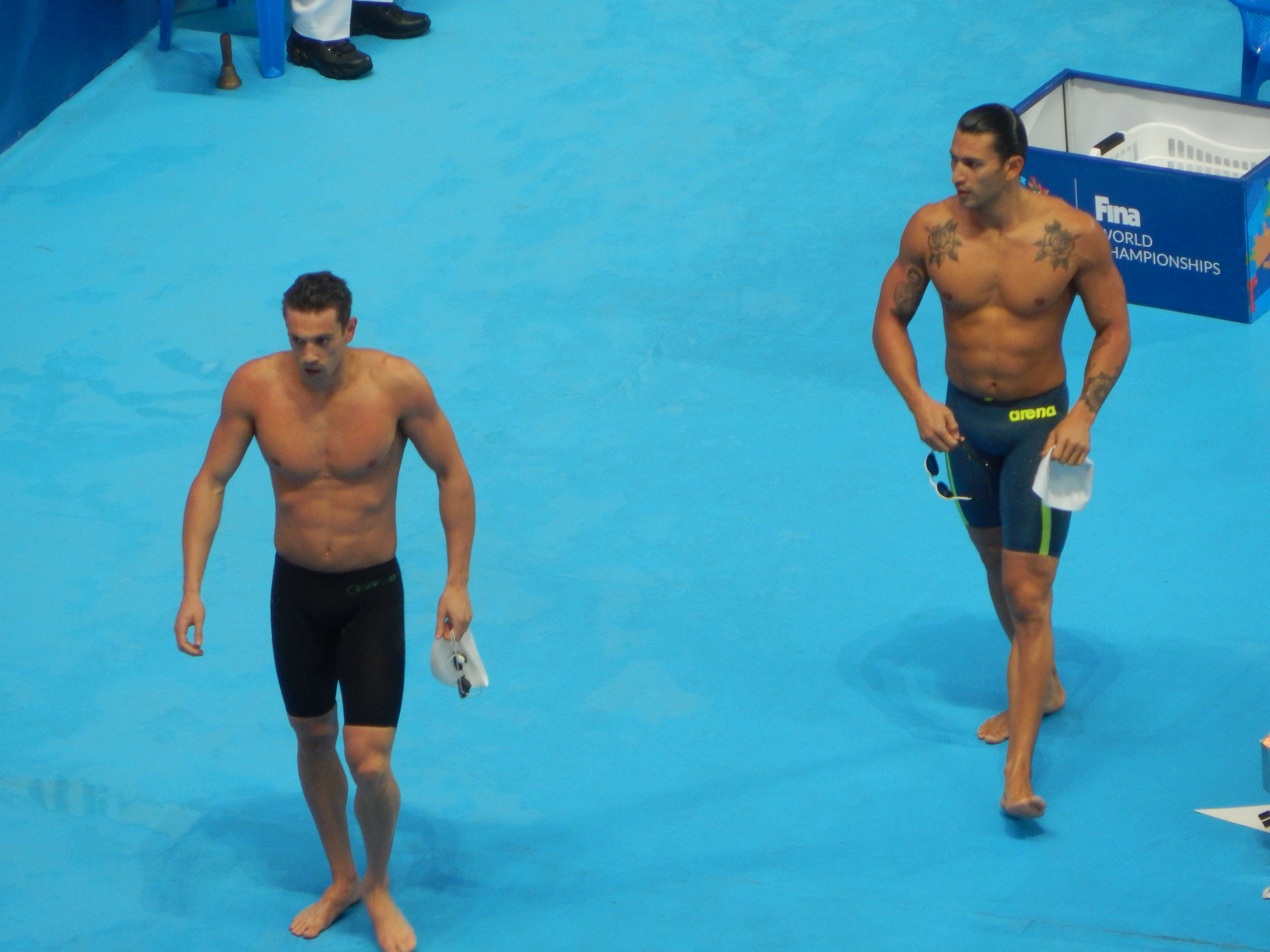
Čaba Silađi and Giacomo Perez-Dortona after their semi-final

==== Semifinal 1 ====
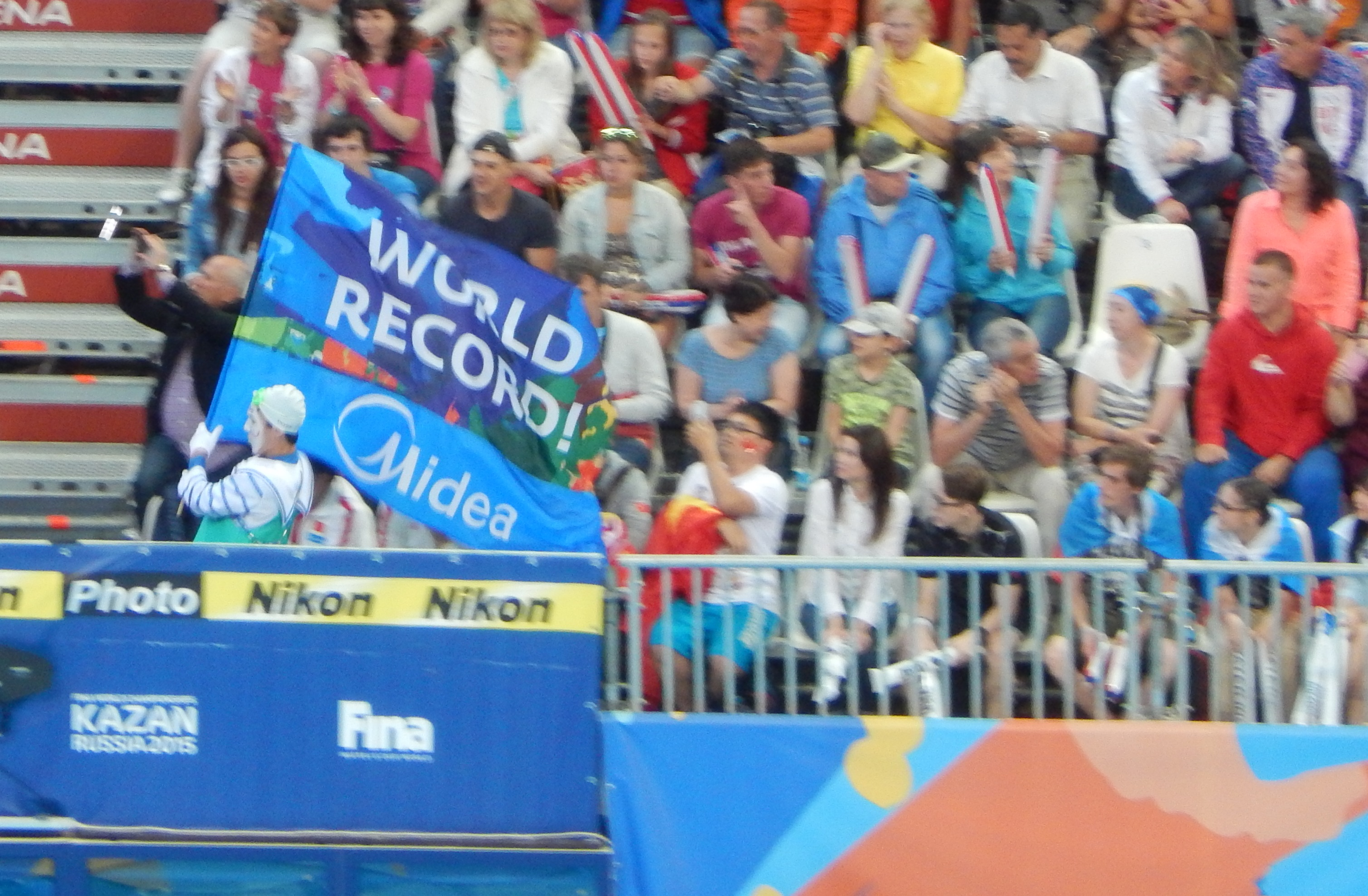
Adam Peaty sets new WR

Rank	Lane	Name	Nationality	Time	Notes
1	4	Adam Peaty	Great Britain	26.42	Q, WR
2	5	Kevin Cordes	United States	26.76	Q, =AM
3	3	Čaba Silađi	Serbia	27.19	Q
4	8	Giedrius Titenis	Lithuania	27.20	Q, NR
5	6	Felipe Lima	Brazil	27.50	
5	7	Peter Stevens	Slovenia	27.50	
7	2	Giacomo Perez-Dortona	France	27.51	
8	1	Andrea Toniato	Italy	27.61	

==== Semifinal 2 ====
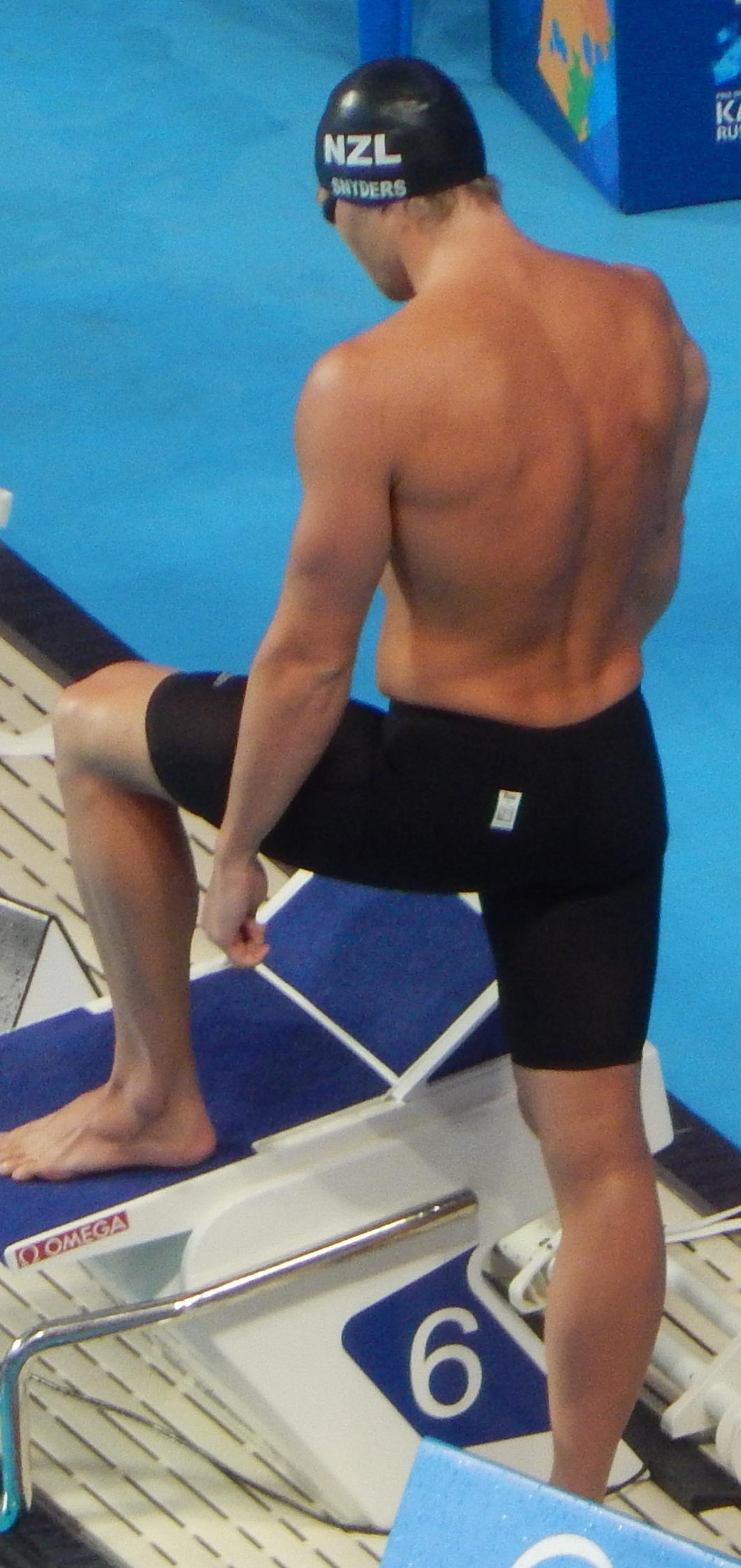
Snyders became fourth and qualify to final heat

Rank	Lane	Name	Nationality	Time	Notes
1	4	Cameron van der Burgh	South Africa	26.74	Q
2	3	Felipe França Silva	Brazil	26.87	Q
3	5	Damir Dugonjič	Slovenia	26.92	Q
4	6	Glenn Snyders	New Zealand	27.17	Q
5	1	Dmitriy Balandin	Kazakhstan	27.24	AS
6	2	Hendrik Feldwehr	Germany	27.31	
7	7	Kirill Prigoda	Russia	27.47	
8	8	Vladislav Mustafin	Uzbekistan	27.79	

=== Final ===
The final was held at 18:10.

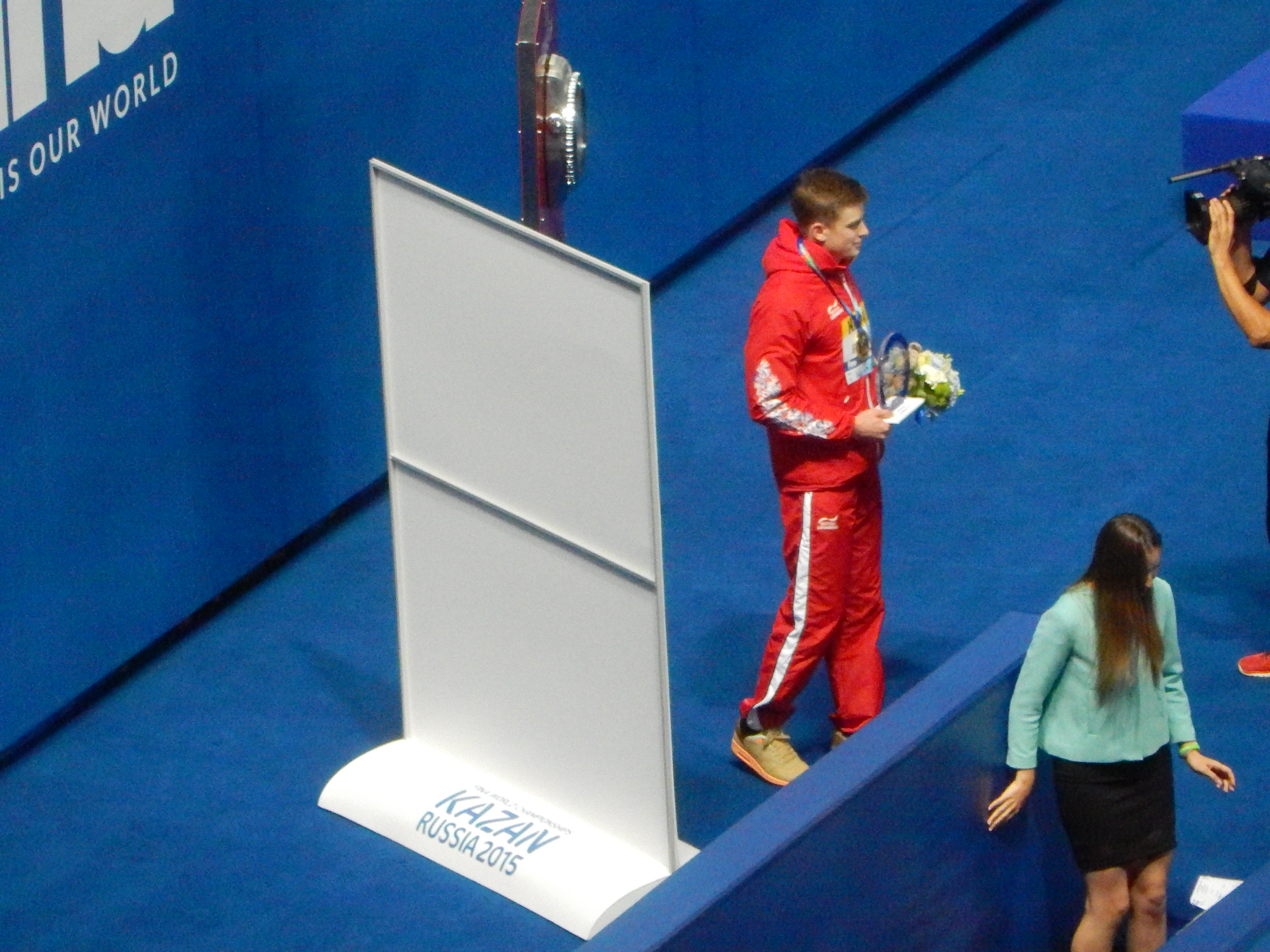
World Record awarded to Adam Peaty

Rank	Lane	Name	Nationality	Time	Notes
1st place, gold medalist(s)	4	Adam Peaty	Great Britain	26.51	
2nd place, silver medalist(s)	5	Cameron van der Burgh	South Africa	26.66	
3rd place, bronze medalist(s)	3	Kevin Cordes	United States	26.86	
4	6	Felipe França Silva	Brazil	26.87	
5	2	Damir Dugonjič	Slovenia	27.23	
5	8	Giedrius Titenis	Lithuania	27.23	
7	7	Glenn Snyders	New Zealand	27.36	
8	1	Čaba Silađi	Serbia	27.45	
