= Swimming at the 2015 World Aquatics Championships – Men's 100 metre butterfly =

Men's 100 metre butterfly at the 2015 World Aquatics Championships
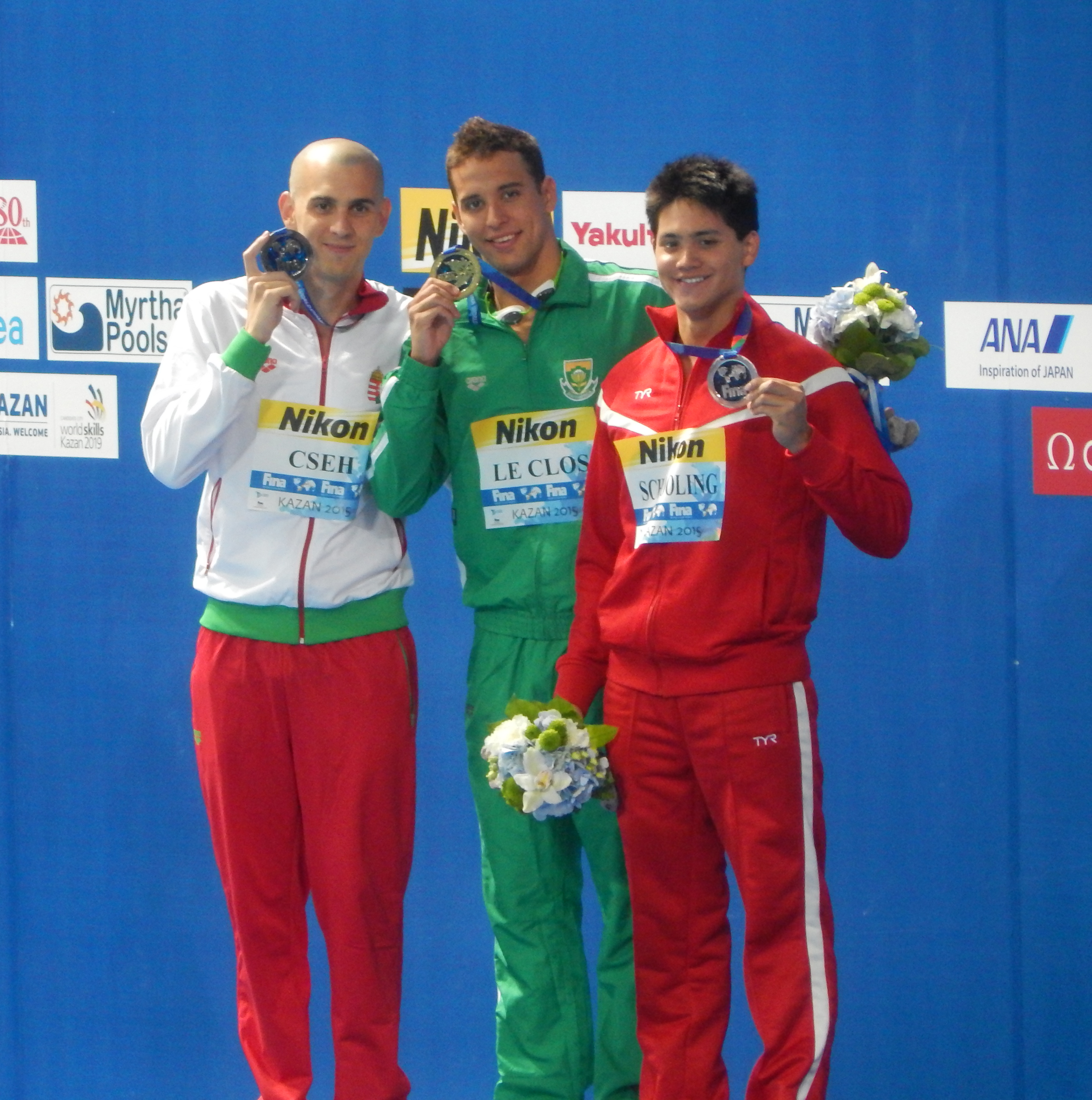
- Victory Ceremony
- Dates: 7 August (heats and semifinals); 8 August (final)
- Competitors: 73 from 65 nations
- Winning time: 50.56

Medalists
gold medal	Chad le Clos	South Africa
silver medal	László Cseh	Hungary
bronze medal	Joseph Schooling	Singapore

The Men's 100 metre butterfly competition of the swimming events at the 2015 World Aquatics Championships was held on 7 August with the heats and the semifinals and 8 August with the final.

== Records ==
Prior to the competition, the existing world and championship records were as follows.

World record	Michael Phelps (USA)	49.82	Rome, Italy	1 August 2009
Competition record	Michael Phelps (USA)	49.82	Rome, Italy	1 August 2009

== Results ==
=== Heats ===
The heats were held at 10:09

Rank	Heat	Lane	Name	Nationality	Time	Notes
1	6	6	László Cseh	Hungary	50.91	Q, NR
2	7	4	Tom Shields	United States	51.09	Q
3	7	7	Li Zhuhao	China	51.54	Q, WJ
4	6	4	Konrad Czerniak	Poland	51.58	Q
5	8	6	Joseph Schooling	Singapore	51.65	Q, NR
6	7	2	Takuro Fujii	Japan	51.76	Q
7	7	6	Paweł Korzeniowski	Poland	51.79	Q
8	8	4	Chad le Clos	South Africa	51.83	Q
9	7	1	Matteo Rivolta	Italy	51.88	Q
10	7	5	Tim Phillips	United States	51.90	Q
10	8	7	Steffen Deibler	Germany	51.90	Q
12	6	3	Piero Codia	Italy	51.94	Q
13	8	2	Mehdy Metella	France	52.07	Q
14	7	3	Jayden Hadler	Australia	52.17	Q
15	8	1	Tommaso D'Orsogna	Australia	52.22	Q
16	6	5	Pavel Sankovich	Belarus	52.29	Q
17	6	2	Adam Barrett	Great Britain	52.33	
18	5	2	Santiago Grassi	Argentina	52.36	
19	6	8	Thomas Laxton	Great Britain	52.37	
20	8	8	Evgeny Koptelov	Russia	52.38	
21	6	7	Takeshi Kawamoto	Japan	52.45	
22	8	3	Vyacheslav Prudnikov	Russia	52.47	
23	7	9	Viktor Bromer	Denmark	52.53	
24	7	8	Arthur Mendes	Brazil	52.55	
25	6	9	Luis Martínez	Guatemala	52.72	
26	8	5	Yauhen Tsurkin	Belarus	52.73	
27	5	4	Alexandru Coci	Romania	52.89	
27	5	5	Andreas Vazaios	Greece	52.89	
29	5	1	Nico van Duijn	Switzerland	52.94	
30	5	7	Ryan Pini	Papua New Guinea	53.02	
31	8	9	Ivan Lenđer	Serbia	53.04	
32	3	6	Robert Žbogar	Slovenia	53.10	
33	5	0	Jan Šefl	Czech Republic	53.21	
34	4	5	Simon Sjödin	Sweden	53.40	
35	4	1	Omar Eissa	Egypt	53.68	
35	6	0	Albert Subirats	Venezuela	53.68	
37	3	3	Guy Barnea	Israel	53.76	
37	5	9	Geoffrey Cheah	Hong Kong	53.76	
39	4	3	Ben Hockin	Paraguay	53.92	
40	4	4	Mario Todorović	Croatia	54.00	
41	5	6	Glenn Victor Sutanto	Indonesia	54.18	
42	3	1	Zuhayr Pigot	Suriname	54.20	
43	4	7	Nuno Quintanilha	Portugal	54.27	
44	3	5	Abbas Qali	Kuwait	54.35	
45	4	2	Ralf Tribuntsov	Estonia	54.38	
46	3	8	Franco Reyes	Panama	54.49	
47	4	6	Bradlee Ashby	New Zealand	54.57	
48	4	9	Esnaider Reales	Colombia	54.63	
49	3	4	Tadas Duškinas	Lithuania	54.76	
50	7	0	Daniel Ramírez	Mexico	55.28	
51	3	9	Teimuraz Kobakhidze	Georgia	55.37	
52	2	4	Ifa Paea	Tonga	55.80	
53	3	0	Ayman Kelzi	Syria	55.84	
54	3	7	Raphaël Stacchiotti	Luxembourg	55.96	
55	2	5	Ralph Goveia	Zambia	56.34	
56	2	1	Nouamane Batahi	Morocco	57.11	
57	2	6	Aldo Castillo	Bolivia	57.38	
58	2	2	Winter Heaven	Samoa	57.47	
59	2	9	Joshua Daniel	Saint Lucia	57.66	
60	2	3	Cherantha de Silva	FINA Independent Athletes	57.79	
61	2	0	Oumar Touré	Mali	58.00	
62	2	8	Boško Radulović	Montenegro	58.10	
63	1	3	Ifeakachuku Nmor	Nigeria	58.48	
64	2	7	Batsaikhany Dulguun	Mongolia	58.57	NR
65	1	4	Pou Sovijja	Cambodia	58.92	
66	1	5	Hasan Sadeq	Iraq	59.58	
67	1	6	Ismaël Kane	Senegal	1:00.94	
68	1	7	Hannibal Gaskin	Guyana	1:01.47	
69	1	2	Thint Myat	Myanmar	1:02.78	
70	1	1	Hilal Hemed Hilal	Tanzania	1:03.87	
71	1	0	Mark Hoare	Eswatini	1:04.76	
72	1	8	Belly-Cresus Ganira	Burundi	1:07.16	
73	1	9	Chaoili Aonzoudine	Comoros	1:21.89	
	3	2	Hoàng Quý Phước	Vietnam		DNS
	4	0	Dylan Carter	Trinidad and Tobago		DNS
	4	8	Louis Croenen	Belgium		DNS
	5	3	Rafael Muñoz	Spain		DNS
	5	8	Mauricio Fiol	Peru		DNS
	6	1	Thiago Pereira	Brazil		DNS
	8	0	Mateo González	Mexico		DNS

=== Semifinals ===
The semifinals were held on 7 August at 18.35.

==== Semifinal 1 ====
Rank	Lane	Name	Nationality	Time	Notes
1	4	Tom Shields	United States	51.03	Q
2	6	Chad le Clos	South Africa	51.11	Q
3	5	Konrad Czerniak	Poland	51.29	Q
4	3	Takuro Fujii	Japan	51.58	
5	1	Jayden Hadler	Australia	52.09	
6	2	Tim Phillips	United States	52.14	
7	7	Piero Codia	Italy	52.22	
8	8	Pavel Sankovich	Belarus	52.63	

==== Semifinal 2 ====
Rank	Lane	Name	Nationality	Time	Notes
1	4	László Cseh	Hungary	51.03	Q
2	5	Li Zhuhao	China	51.33	Q, WJ
3	1	Mehdy Metella	France	51.39	Q, NR
4	3	Joseph Schooling	Singapore	51.40	Q, NR
5	6	Paweł Korzeniowski	Poland	51.51	Q
6	2	Matteo Rivolta	Italy	51.64	=NR
7	7	Steffen Deibler	Germany	52.07	
8	8	Tommaso D'Orsogna	Australia	52.26	

=== Final ===
The final was held on 8 August at 18:13.

Rank	Lane	Name	Nationality	Time	Notes
1st place, gold medalist(s)	3	Chad le Clos	South Africa	50.56	AF
2nd place, silver medalist(s)	5	László Cseh	Hungary	50.87	NR
3rd place, bronze medalist(s)	1	Joseph Schooling	Singapore	50.96	AS
4	4	Tom Shields	United States	51.06	
5	7	Mehdy Metella	France	51.24	NR
6	6	Konrad Czerniak	Poland	51.28	
7	8	Paweł Korzeniowski	Poland	51.46	
8	2	Li Zhuhao	China	51.66	
