= Swimming at the 2015 World Aquatics Championships – Men's 100 metre freestyle =

Men's 100 metre freestyle at the 2015 World Aquatics Championships
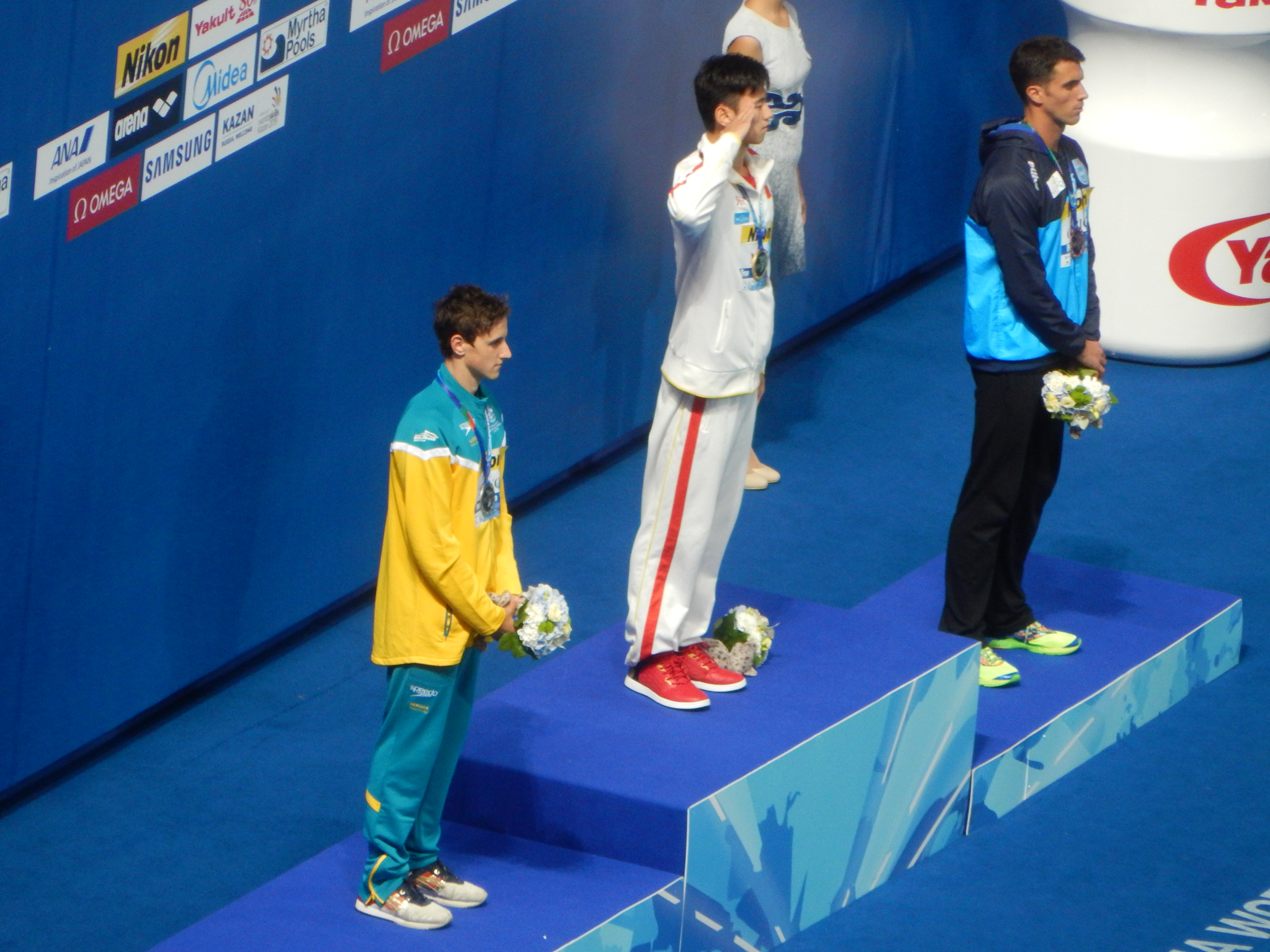
- Victory Ceremony
- Dates: 5 August (heats and semifinals); 6 August (final)
- Competitors: 115 from 100 nations
- Winning time: 47.84

Medalists
gold medal	Ning Zetao	China
silver medal	Cameron McEvoy	Australia
bronze medal	Federico Grabich	Argentina

The men's 100 metre freestyle competition of the swimming events at the 2015 World Aquatics Championships was held on 5 August with the heats and the semifinals and 6 August with the final.

Asian Record holder Ning Zetao became the first Chinese male ever to win the 100 meter freestyle at the World Championships. Coming from second at the halfway turn, Ning beat Australian favorite Cameron McEvoy to win his first ever World Championship medal in 47.84. McEvoy finished second in a time of 47.95, while Argentina's Federico Grabich emerged as a serious sprint freestyle threat, winning the bronze and his nation's first ever World Championship medal in 48.12.

After leading at the 50 meter mark, Canada's Santo Condorelli faded to fourth in 48.19, while Brazil's Marcelo Chierighini finished fifth in 48.28, beating out hometown favorite Alexander Sukhorukov by a hundredth of a second. Plagued by a shoulder injury, defending Olympic Champion Nathan Adrian (48.31) tied for seventh with Belgium's Pieter Timmers.

After sustaining a shoulder injury, Australia's James Magnussen was forced to withdraw from the event, leaving him unable to defend his world title. Russia's Vladimir Morozov, who had the top time in the world coming into the event, left the blocks early in the semifinals, therefore ending his hope of being the first Russian since Alexander Popov to win the coveted 100 meter freestyle at the World Championships.

== Records ==
Prior to the competition, the existing world and championship records were as follows.

World record	César Cielo (BRA)	46.91	Rome, Italy	30 July 2009
Competition record	César Cielo (BRA)	46.91	Rome, Italy	30 July 2009

== Results ==
=== Heats ===
The heats were held at 09:43.

Rank	Heat	Lane	Name	Nationality	Time	Notes
1	11	4	Ning Zetao	China	48.11	Q
2	12	4	Cameron McEvoy	Australia	48.33	Q
3	10	4	Vladimir Morozov	Russia	48.46	Q
4	12	9	Federico Grabich	Argentina	48.48	Q
5	12	2	Jérémy Stravius	France	48.52	Q
6	10	2	Pieter Timmers	Belgium	48.58	Q
7	10	5	Sebastiaan Verschuren	Netherlands	48.61	Q
7	12	5	Nathan Adrian	United States	48.61	Q
9	11	3	Alexandr Sukhorukov	Russia	48.64	Q
10	10	3	Fabien Gilot	France	48.73	Q
11	11	1	Santo Condorelli	Canada	48.77	Q
12	10	7	Matheus Santana	Brazil	48.81	Q
13	11	5	Marco Orsi	Italy	48.82	Q
14	12	7	Shinri Shioura	Japan	48.84	Q
15	11	0	Marcelo Chierighini	Brazil	48.92	Q
16	12	0	Paweł Korzeniowski	Poland	48.93	Q
17	12	6	Luca Dotto	Italy	49.01	
18	11	2	Tommaso D'Orsogna	Australia	49.04	
19	11	6	Katsumi Nakamura	Japan	49.07	
20	10	1	Kristian Golomeev	Greece	49.12	
20	10	8	Jimmy Feigen	United States	49.12	
22	9	5	Jasper Aerents	Belgium	49.24	
23	11	7	Ben Proud	Great Britain	49.35	
24	10	9	Dylan Carter	Trinidad and Tobago	49.40	
25	10	0	Cristian Quintero	Venezuela	49.46	
26	11	9	Odysseus Meladinis	Greece	49.47	
27	8	3	Mindaugas Sadauskas	Lithuania	49.49	
28	9	4	Yu Hexin	China	49.50	
29	9	6	Yuri Kisil	Canada	49.56	
29	11	8	Marius Radu	Romania	49.56	
31	12	8	Yauhen Tsurkin	Belarus	49.67	
32	12	1	Calum Jarvis	Great Britain	49.68	
33	9	2	Krisztián Takács	Hungary	49.76	
34	8	5	Christoffer Carlsen	Sweden	49.78	
35	8	2	Kemal Arda Gürdal	Turkey	49.80	
36	9	7	Andriy Hovorov	Ukraine	49.81	
37	8	4	Geoffrey Cheah	Hong Kong	49.96	
38	8	0	David Gamburg	Israel	49.98	
39	8	1	Quah Zheng Wen	Singapore	49.99	
40	8	8	Martin Verner	Czech Republic	50.01	
41	9	3	Velimir Stjepanović	Serbia	50.07	
42	9	9	Renzo Tjon A Joe	Suriname	50.12	
43	8	7	Ben Hockin	Paraguay	50.19	
44	9	1	Arseni Kukharau	Belarus	50.21	
45	7	5	Alexandre Haldemann	Switzerland	50.28	
46	7	7	Sidni Hoxha	Albania	50.45	
47	6	6	Park Seon-kwan	South Korea	50.53	
48	8	9	Ari-Pekka Liukkonen	Finland	50.64	
49	7	1	Mario Todorović	Croatia	50.66	
50	9	8	Daniel Ramírez	Mexico	50.70	
51	7	8	Daniil Tulupov	Uzbekistan	50.71	
52	7	3	Julien Henx	Luxembourg	50.77	
53	7	4	Ali Khalafalla	Egypt	50.84	
54	7	9	Matthew Abeysinghe	FINA Independent Athletes	50.93	
55	7	2	Nicholas Magana	Peru	50.99	
56	6	2	Aleksandar Nikolov	Bulgaria	51.01	
57	7	6	Christian Scherübl	Austria	51.02	
58	9	0	Lorenzo Loria	Mexico	51.18	
59	6	4	Luis Flores	Puerto Rico	51.21	
59	6	5	Hoàng Quý Phước	Vietnam	51.21	
61	6	8	Sean Gunn	Zimbabwe	51.30	
62	6	7	Lim Ching Hwang	Malaysia	51.31	
63	5	5	Andrew Chetcuti	Malta	51.35	
64	6	9	Sam Seghers	Papua New Guinea	51.35	
65	5	7	Jordan Augier	Saint Lucia	51.39	
66	6	3	Aaron D'Souza	India	51.41	
67	5	6	Jagger Stephens	Guam	51.50	
68	6	1	Mikel Schreuders	Aruba	51.77	
69	5	2	Allan Gutiérrez	Honduras	51.83	
70	6	0	Stanislav Karnaukhov	Kyrgyzstan	51.96	
71	5	1	Mario Montoya	Costa Rica	52.06	
72	7	0	Janis Saltans	Latvia	52.07	
73	4	1	Igor Mogne	Mozambique	52.09	
74	4	5	Ifa Paea	Tonga	52.21	
75	5	3	Oliver Elliot	Chile	52.50	
76	4	6	Winter Heaven	Samoa	52.77	
77	5	0	Miguel Mena	Nicaragua	52.78	
78	5	4	Sidrell Williams	Jamaica	52.81	
79	3	3	Mohammad Rahman	Bangladesh	52.89	
80	5	8	Jhonny Pérez	Dominican Republic	53.16	
81	5	9	Abdoul Niane	Senegal	53.33	
82	4	4	Christian Selby	Barbados	53.48	
83	3	5	Mohammed Bedour	Jordan	53.53	
84	3	4	Meli Malani	Fiji	53.68	
85	4	3	Issa Mohamed	Kenya	54.02	
86	4	9	Alexander Skinner	Namibia	54.05	
87	4	2	Adel El-Fakir	Libya	54.18	
88	3	6	Valentin Gorshkov	Turkmenistan	54.28	
89	4	7	Boško Radulović	Montenegro	54.53	
90	3	2	Andre van der Merwe	Botswana	54.69	
91	3	1	Christian Nikles	Brunei	54.75	NR
92	4	0	Vladimir Mamikonyan	Armenia	55.12	
93	4	8	Farhan Saleh	Bahrain	55.18	
94	3	7	Bakr Al-Dulaimi	Iraq	55.22	
95	3	8	Delgerkhuu Myagmar	Mongolia	55.67	
96	3	0	Stefano Mitchell	Antigua and Barbuda	56.34	
97	2	4	Hannibal Gaskin	Guyana	56.85	
98	3	9	Abeiku Jackson	Ghana	56.94	
99	2	5	Giordan Harris	Marshall Islands	57.75	
100	2	3	Sirish Gurung	Nepal	58.22	
100	2	6	Ammaar Ghadiyali	Tanzania	58.22	
102	1	9	Rony Bakale	Congo	58.64	
103	2	1	Mamadou Soumaré	Mali	59.33	
104	2	0	Shawn Dingilius-Wallace	Palau	59.46	
105	2	7	Alois Dansou	Benin	59.58	
106	1	3	Mark Hoare	Eswatini	59.62	
107	2	2	Belly-Cresus Ganira	Burundi	59.74	
108	2	9	Takumi Sugie	Northern Mariana Islands	1:00.23	
109	1	1	Meriton Veliu	Kosovo	1:00.41	
110	1	5	Mohamed Adnan	Maldives	1:00.71	
111	1	6	Kaleo Kihleng	Federated States of Micronesia	1:01.71	
112	1	2	Soulasen Phommasen	Laos	1:02.18	
113	2	8	Athoumane Solihi	Comoros	1:03.09	
114	1	7	Amadou Camara	Guinea	1:04.00	
115	1	4	Robel Habte	Ethiopia	1:04.41	
	1	8	Fenel Lamour	Haiti	DNS	
	8	6	Pjotr Degtjarjov	Estonia	DNS	
	10	6	Konrad Czerniak	Poland	DNS	
	12	3	Paul Biedermann	Germany	DNS	

=== Semifinals ===
The semifinals were held at 17:32.

==== Semifinal 1 ====
Rank	Lane	Name	Nationality	Time	Notes
1	4	Cameron McEvoy	Australia	47.94	Q
2	5	Federico Grabich	Argentina	48.20	Q
3	3	Pieter Timmers	Belgium	48.22	Q, NR
4	6	Nathan Adrian	United States	48.36	Q
5	7	Matheus Santana	Brazil	48.52	
6	8	Paweł Korzeniowski	Poland	48.55	
7	2	Fabien Gilot	France	48.56	
8	1	Shinri Shioura	Japan	48.96	

==== Semifinal 2 ====
Rank	Lane	Name	Nationality	Time	Notes
1	4	Ning Zetao	China	48.13	Q
2	8	Marcelo Chierighini	Brazil	48.37	Q
3	2	Alexandr Sukhorukov	Russia	48.40	Q
4	7	Santo Condorelli	Canada	48.49	Q
5	6	Sebastiaan Verschuren	Netherlands	48.59	
6	3	Jérémy Stravius	France	48.65	
7	1	Marco Orsi	Italy	48.69	
	5	Vladimir Morozov	Russia	DSQ	

=== Final ===
The final was held at 18:05.

Rank	Lane	Name	Nationality	Time	Notes
1st place, gold medalist(s)	5	Ning Zetao	China	47.84	
2nd place, silver medalist(s)	4	Cameron McEvoy	Australia	47.95	
3rd place, bronze medalist(s)	3	Federico Grabich	Argentina	48.12	
4	8	Santo Condorelli	Canada	48.19	
5	7	Marcelo Chierighini	Brazil	48.27	
6	1	Alexandr Sukhorukov	Russia	48.28	
7	2	Nathan Adrian	United States	48.31	
7	6	Pieter Timmers	Belgium	48.31	
