= Canada at the 2015 World Aquatics Championships =

- Flag of Canada
- World Aquatics code: CAN
- National federation: Aquatic Federation of Canada
- Website: www.aquaticscanadaaquatiques.com

in Kazan, Russia
- Competitors: 76 in 6 sports
- Medals Ranked 17th: Gold 0 Silver 4 Bronze 4 Total 8

World Aquatics Championships appearances
- 1973; 1975; 1978; 1982; 1986; 1991; 1994; 1998; 2001; 2003; 2005; 2007; 2009; 2011; 2013; 2015; 2017; 2019; 2022; 2023; 2024; 2025

Canada competed at the 2015 World Aquatics Championships in Kazan, Russia from 24 July to 9 August 2015.

== Medallists ==
Medal	Name	Sport	Event	Date
Silver	Jennifer Abel; Pamela Ware	Diving	Women's synchronized 3 metre springboard	July 25
Silver	Vincent Riendeau; Meaghan Benfeito	Diving	Mixed 10 m synchronized platform	July 25
Silver	Meaghan Benfeito; Roseline Filion	Diving	Women's 10 m synchronized platform	July 27
Silver	François Imbeau-Dulac; Jennifer Abel	Diving	Mixed 3 m synchronized springboard	August 2
Bronze	Ryan Cochrane	Swimming	Men's 400 m freestyle	August 2
Bronze	Santo Condorelli; Yuri Kisil; Karl Krug*; Sandrine Mainville; Victoria Poon*; Chantal van Landeghem	Swimming	Mixed 4×100 m freestyle relay	August 8
Bronze	Ryan Cochrane	Swimming	Men's 1500 m freestyle	August 9
Bronze	Emily Overholt	Swimming	Women's 400 m individual medley	August 9

Medals by sport
Sport	1st place, gold medalist(s)	2nd place, silver medalist(s)	3rd place, bronze medalist(s)	Total
Diving	0	4	0	4
High diving	0	0	0	0
Swimming	0	0	4	4
Open water swimming	0	0	0	0
Synchronized swimming	0	0	0	0
Water polo	0	0	0	0
Total	0	4	4	8

== Diving ==
Canada qualified a full team of 8 divers.

Men

Athlete	Event	Preliminaries		Semifinals		Final	
Athlete	Event	Points	Rank	Points	Rank	Points	Rank
Philippe Gagné	3 m springboard	421.45	16 Q	381.00	18	Did not advance	
François Imbeau-Dulac	3 m springboard	377.20	32	Did not advance			
Maxim Bouchard	10 m platform	407.40	20	Did not advance			
Vincent Riendeau	10 m platform	435.45	16 Q	396.10	16	Did not advance	
Philippe Gagné; François Imbeau-Dulac	3 m synchronized springboard	373.59	12 Q	—N/a		408.66	5
Philippe Gagné; Vincent Riendeau	10 m synchronized platform	372.78	14	—N/a		Did not advance	

Women

Athlete	Event	Preliminaries		Semifinals		Final	
Athlete	Event	Points	Rank	Points	Rank	Points	Rank
Jennifer Abel	3 m springboard	348.70	3 Q	353.90	3 Q	331.50	6
Pamela Ware	3 m springboard	317.30	5 Q	318.65	6 Q	332.40	5
Meaghan Benfeito	10 m platform	312.75	15 Q	320.75	12 Q	343.80	7
Roseline Filion	10 m platform	318.60	13 Q	318.05	13	Did not advance	
Jennifer Abel; Pamela Ware	3 m synchronized springboard	302.01	2 Q	—N/a		319.47	2nd place, silver medalist(s)
Meaghan Benfeito; Roseline Filion	10 m synchronized platform	313.26	2 Q	—N/a		339.99	2nd place, silver medalist(s)

Mixed

Athlete	Event	Final	
Athlete	Event	Points	Rank
François Imbeau-Dulac; Jennifer Abel	3 m synchronized springboard	317.01	2nd place, silver medalist(s)
Vincent Riendeau; Meaghan Benfeito	10 m synchronized platform	309.66	2nd place, silver medalist(s)

== High diving ==
Canada qualified one high diver to compete at the World Championships.

Athlete	Event	Points	Rank
Lysanne Richard	Women's high diving	216.35	5

== Open water swimming ==
Canada has fielded a team of four swimmers to compete in the open water marathon.

Athlete	Event	Time	Rank
Eric Hedlin	Men's 10 km	1:56:52.3	56
Richard Weinberger	Men's 10 km	1:50:19.9	8
Jade Dusablon	Women's 5 km	1:00:52.7	22
Jade Dusablon	Women's 10 km	2:00:35.0	34
Samantha Harding	Women's 5 km	1:00:50.3	19
Samantha Harding	Women's 10 km	1:59:47.1	27

== Swimming ==
Canadian swimmers earned qualifying standards in the following events (up to a maximum of 2 swimmers in each event at the A-standard entry time, and 1 at the B-standard):

Men

Athlete	Event	Heat		Semifinal		Final	
Athlete	Event	Time	Rank	Time	Rank	Time	Rank
Jeremy Bagshaw	200 m freestyle	1:48.29	24	Did not advance			
Jeremy Bagshaw	400 m freestyle	3:50.54	23	—N/a		Did not advance	
Ryan Cochrane	400 m freestyle	3:45.86	3 Q	—N/a		3:44.59	3rd place, bronze medalist(s)
Ryan Cochrane	800 m freestyle	7:50.28	10	—N/a		Did not advance	
Ryan Cochrane	1500 m freestyle	14:55.96	6 Q	—N/a		14:51.08	3rd place, bronze medalist(s)
Santo Condorelli	100 m freestyle	48.77	11 Q	48.49	8 Q	48.19	4
Santo Condorelli	50 m butterfly	23.67	15 Q	23.30	9	Did not advance	
Richard Funk	50 m breaststroke	27.71	20	Did not advance			
Richard Funk	100 m breaststroke	1:00.26	14 Q	1:00.43	15	Did not advance	
Richard Funk	200 m breaststroke	2:13.33	27	Did not advance			
Yuri Kisil	100 m freestyle	49.56	29	Did not advance			
Karl Krug	50 m freestyle	22.88	33	Did not advance			
Russell Wood	50 m backstroke	25.79	31	Did not advance			
Russell Wood	100 m backstroke	54.90	29	Did not advance			
Santo Condorelli; Yuri Kisil; Karl Krug; Evan van Moerkerke	4×100 m freestyle relay	3:15.00	6 Q	—N/a		3:15.94	8
Russell Wood; Richard Funk; Santo Condorelli; Yuri Kisil	4×100 m medley relay	3:35.72	13	—N/a		Did not advance	

Women

Athlete	Event	Heat		Semifinal		Final	
Athlete	Event	Time	Rank	Time	Rank	Time	Rank
Dominique Bouchard	50 m backstroke	28.66	19	Did not advance			
Dominique Bouchard	100 m backstroke	1:00.61	15 Q	1:00.31	11	Did not advance	
Dominique Bouchard	200 m backstroke	2:08.66	3 Q	2:08.16	4 Q	2:08.51	6
Hilary Caldwell	100 m backstroke	1:00.69	18 Q	1:00.39	12	Did not advance	
Hilary Caldwell	200 m backstroke	2:10.92	15	2:08.99	6 Q	2:08.66	7
Audrey Lacroix	200 m butterfly	2:08.79	11 Q	2:08.86	12	Did not advance	
Martha McCabe	200 m breaststroke	2:26.51	21	Did not advance			
Rachel Nicol	50 m breaststroke	30.86	11 Q	31.04	10	Did not advance	
Rachel Nicol	100 m breaststroke	1:07.52	14 Q	1:07.24	11	Did not advance	
Emily Overholt	200 m freestyle	1:59.61	21	Did not advance			
Emily Overholt	400 m freestyle	4:14.45	22	—N/a		Did not advance	
Emily Overholt	400 m individual medley	4:35.86	3 Q	—N/a		4:32.52	3rd place, bronze medalist(s)
Sydney Pickrem	200 m individual medley	2:10.94	4 Q	2:10.08	5 Q	2:10.32	6
Sydney Pickrem	400 m individual medley	4:40.60	14	—N/a		Did not advance	
Katerine Savard	200 m freestyle	2:00.30	26	Did not advance			
Katerine Savard	100 m butterfly	57.96	5 Q	57.52	4 Q	57.69	5
Kierra Smith	100 m breaststroke	1:07.88	21	Did not advance			
Kierra Smith	200 m breaststroke	2:24.12	11 Q	2:22.82	5 Q	2:23.61	8
Noemie Thomas	50 m butterfly	26.46	14 Q	26.37	15	Did not advance	
Noemie Thomas	100 m butterfly	58.35	12 Q	58.05	8 Q	57.94	7
Chantal van Landeghem	50 m freestyle	24.94	12 Q	24.52	8 Q	24.39 NR	5
Chantal van Landeghem	100 m freestyle	54.54	13 Q	53.93	9	Did not advance	
Michelle Williams	50 m freestyle	25.13	14 Q	24.84	12	Did not advance	
Michelle Williams	100 m freestyle	55.08	20	Did not advance			
Sandrine Mainville; Michelle Williams; Chantal van Landeghem; Katerine Savard; Victoria Poon*	4×100 m freestyle relay	3:37.64	5 Q	—N/a		3:36.44	5
Katerine Savard; Alyson Ackman; Emily Overholt; Kennedy Goss	4×200 m freestyle relay	7:57.31	11	—N/a		Did not advance	
Dominique Bouchard; Rachel Nicol; Noemie Thomas; Sandrine Mainville	4×100 m medley relay	3:59.02	6 Q	—N/a		3:57.96	6

Mixed

Athlete	Event	Heat		Final	
Athlete	Event	Time	Rank	Time	Rank
Santo Condorelli; Yuri Kisil; Chantal van Landeghem; Sandrine Mainville; Karl Krug*; Victoria Poon*	4×100 m freestyle relay	3:27.75	7 Q	3:23.59	3rd place, bronze medalist(s)
Russell Wood; Richard Funk; Katerine Savard; Sandrine Mainville; Rachel Nicol*; Noemie Thomas*; Karl Krug*	4×100 m medley relay	3:49.60	8 Q	3:46.23	7

== Synchronized swimming ==
Thirteen Canadian synchronized swimmers (one male and twelve female) have been selected to compete in the following events at the World Championships.

Women

Athlete	Event	Preliminaries		Final	
Athlete	Event	Points	Rank	Points	Rank
Jacqueline Simoneau	Solo technical routine	88.0766	6 Q	89.0237	6
Jacqueline Simoneau	Solo free routine	89.8000	6 Q	90.2333	6
Jacqueline Simoneau; Karine Thomas	Duet technical routine	87.6537	6 Q	89.4176	6
Jacqueline Simoneau; Karine Thomas	Duet free routine	89.6000	7 Q	89.3667	7
Gabriella Brisson; Annabelle Frappier; Claudia Holzner; Rebecca Maule*; Marie-Lou Marin; Samantha Nealon; Lisa Sanders; Jacqueline Simoneau; Karine Thomas	Team technical routine	88.9029	6 Q	88.8885	6
Gabriella Brisson; Annabelle Frappier; Claudia Holzner; Rebecca Maule*; Marie-Lou Marin; Samantha Nealon; Lisa Sanders; Jacqueline Simoneau; Karine Thomas	Team free routine	89.8000	7 Q	90.0000	7
Gabrielle Boisvert*; Gabriella Brisson; Annabelle Frappier; Claudia Holzner; Rebecca Maule; Marie-Lou Marin; Samantha Nealon; Lisa Sanders; Elizabeth Savard; Jacqueline Simoneau; Karine Thomas	Free routine combination	89.4000	6 Q	90.3667	6

* Reserves

Mixed

Athlete	Event	Preliminaries		Final	
Athlete	Event	Points	Rank	Points	Rank
René Prévost; Stéphanie Leclair	Duet free routine	82.3333	8 Q	82.5333	8

== Water polo ==
=== Men's tournament ===
Canada qualified a men's team.

Team roster

- Robin Randall
- Con Kudaba
- Oliver Vikalo
- Nicolas Constantin-Bicari
- Justin Boyd
- David Lapins
- Alec Taschereau
- Kevin Graham
- Matt Halajian
- John Conway
- George Torakis
- Jerry McElroy
- Dusan Aleksic

Group play

Pos	Team	Pld	W	D	L	GF	GA	GD	Pts	Qualification
1	Croatia	3	3	0	0	39	17	+22	6	Advanced to quarterfinals
2	Canada	3	2	0	1	25	20	+5	4	Advanced to playoffs
3	Brazil	3	0	1	2	24	29	−5	1	Advanced to playoffs
4	China	3	0	1	2	12	34	−22	1	

Source: SportResult.com
Rules for classification: 1) points; 2) head-to-head points; 3) head-to-head goal difference; 4) head-to-head number of goals scored; 5) goal difference.

27 July 2015; 09:30	Report	Croatia	12–7	Canada	Kazan; Attendance: 507; Referees: Radosław Koryzna (POL), German Moller (ARG)
27 July 2015; 09:30	Report	Score by quarters: 4–2, 6–2, 1–0, 1–3			Kazan; Attendance: 507; Referees: Radosław Koryzna (POL), German Moller (ARG)
27 July 2015; 09:30	Report	four players 2	Goals	Conway 3	Kazan; Attendance: 507; Referees: Radosław Koryzna (POL), German Moller (ARG)

29 July 2015; 20:10	Report	China	2–8	Canada	Kazan; Attendance: 240; Referees: Stanko Ivanovski (MNE), György Kun (HUN)
29 July 2015; 20:10	Report	Score by quarters: 0–3, 0–3, 1–1, 1–1			Kazan; Attendance: 240; Referees: Stanko Ivanovski (MNE), György Kun (HUN)
29 July 2015; 20:10	Report	Tan Feihu 2	Goals	McElroy 3	Kazan; Attendance: 240; Referees: Stanko Ivanovski (MNE), György Kun (HUN)

31 July 2015; 20:10	Report	Brazil	6–10	Canada	Kazan; Attendance: 230; Referees: Mark Koganov (AZE), György Kun (HUN)
31 July 2015; 20:10	Report	Score by quarters: 0–3, 3–3, 2–3, 1–1			Kazan; Attendance: 230; Referees: Mark Koganov (AZE), György Kun (HUN)
31 July 2015; 20:10	Report	Silva 2	Goals	Boyd, McElroy 2	Kazan; Attendance: 230; Referees: Mark Koganov (AZE), György Kun (HUN)

Playoffs

2 August 2015; 13:30	Report	Canada	2–8	Italy	Kazan; Attendance: 269; Referees: Mark Koganov (AZE), Francesc Buch (ESP)
2 August 2015; 13:30	Report	Score by quarters: 0–2, 1–1, 1–2, 0–3			Kazan; Attendance: 269; Referees: Mark Koganov (AZE), Francesc Buch (ESP)
2 August 2015; 13:30	Report	Kudaba, Torakis 1	Goals	Giorgetti, Gitto 2	Kazan; Attendance: 269; Referees: Mark Koganov (AZE), Francesc Buch (ESP)

9th–12th place semifinals

4 August 2015; 12:10	Report	Canada	9–7	Kazakhstan	Kazan; Attendance: 421; Referees: Stanko Ivanovski (MNE), German Moller (ARG)
4 August 2015; 12:10	Report	Score by quarters: 1–2, 5–0, 2–3, 1–2			Kazan; Attendance: 421; Referees: Stanko Ivanovski (MNE), German Moller (ARG)
4 August 2015; 12:10	Report	Conway 4	Goals	Axenov 3	Kazan; Attendance: 421; Referees: Stanko Ivanovski (MNE), German Moller (ARG)

Ninth place game

6 August 2015; 12:10	Report	Canada	7–7 (PSO)	Brazil	Kazan; Attendance: 308; Referees: Mark Koganov (AZE), Viktor Salnichenko (KAZ)
6 August 2015; 12:10	Report	Score by quarters: 2–2, 1–1, 2–3, 2–1 PSO: 5–3			Kazan; Attendance: 308; Referees: Mark Koganov (AZE), Viktor Salnichenko (KAZ)
6 August 2015; 12:10	Report	Conway, Kubada 2	Goals	Delgado 3	Kazan; Attendance: 308; Referees: Mark Koganov (AZE), Viktor Salnichenko (KAZ)

=== Women's tournament ===
Canada's qualified a women's team.

Team roster

- Jessica Gaudreault
- Krystina Alogbo
- Katrina Monton
- Emma Wright
- Monika Eggens
- Kelly McKee
- Joëlle Békhazi
- Shae Fournier
- Carmen Eggens
- Christine Robinson
- Stephanie Valin
- Dominique Perreault
- Nicola Colterjohn

Group play

Pos	Team	Pld	W	D	L	GF	GA	GD	Pts	Qualification
1	Spain	3	3	0	0	49	15	+34	6	Advanced to quarterfinals
2	Canada	3	2	0	1	38	22	+16	4	Advanced to playoffs
3	Kazakhstan	3	1	0	2	25	35	−10	2	Advanced to playoffs
4	New Zealand	3	0	0	3	12	52	−40	0	

Source: SportResult.com
Rules for classification: 1) points; 2) head-to-head points; 3) head-to-head goal difference; 4) head-to-head number of goals scored; 5) goal difference.

26 July 2015; 09:30	Report	Canada	15–6	New Zealand	Kazan; Attendance: 865; Referees: Fabio Toffoli (BRA), Tadao Tahara (JPN)
26 July 2015; 09:30	Report	Score by quarters: 5–1, 2–3, 4–2, 4–0			Kazan; Attendance: 865; Referees: Fabio Toffoli (BRA), Tadao Tahara (JPN)
26 July 2015; 09:30	Report	M. Eggens, Fournier 3	Goals	Myles 2	Kazan; Attendance: 865; Referees: Fabio Toffoli (BRA), Tadao Tahara (JPN)

28 July 2015; 21:30	Report	Canada	17–4	Kazakhstan	Kazan; Attendance: 240; Referees: György Kun (HUN), Ni Shi Wei (CHN)
28 July 2015; 21:30	Report	Score by quarters: 4–1, 2–1, 3–2, 8–0			Kazan; Attendance: 240; Referees: György Kun (HUN), Ni Shi Wei (CHN)
28 July 2015; 21:30	Report	M. Eggens 5	Goals	Mirshina 2	Kazan; Attendance: 240; Referees: György Kun (HUN), Ni Shi Wei (CHN)

30 July 2015; 13:30	Report	Canada	6–12	Spain	Kazan; Attendance: 321; Referees: György Kun (HUN), Mark Koganov (AZE)
30 July 2015; 13:30	Report	Score by quarters: 1–5, 2–4, 2–2, 1–1			Kazan; Attendance: 321; Referees: György Kun (HUN), Mark Koganov (AZE)
30 July 2015; 13:30	Report	M. Eggens 2	Goals	Pareja 3	Kazan; Attendance: 321; Referees: György Kun (HUN), Mark Koganov (AZE)

Playoffs

1 August 2015; 13:30	Report	Canada	5–8	Greece	Kazan; Attendance: 2,055; Referees: German Moller (ARG), Vojin Putniković (SRB)
1 August 2015; 13:30	Report	Score by quarters: 3–3, 1–1, 0–2, 1–2			Kazan; Attendance: 2,055; Referees: German Moller (ARG), Vojin Putniković (SRB)
1 August 2015; 13:30	Report	Valin 2	Goals	Charalampidi 3	Kazan; Attendance: 2,055; Referees: German Moller (ARG), Vojin Putniković (SRB)

9th–12th place semifinals

3 August 2015; 12:10	Report	Canada	7–10	Hungary	Kazan; Attendance: 274; Referees: Ursula Wengenroth (SUI), Cory Williams (NZL)
3 August 2015; 12:10	Report	Score by quarters: 1–2, 2–2, 3–2, 1–4			Kazan; Attendance: 274; Referees: Ursula Wengenroth (SUI), Cory Williams (NZL)
3 August 2015; 12:10	Report	Wright 2	Goals	Keszthelyi 4	Kazan; Attendance: 274; Referees: Ursula Wengenroth (SUI), Cory Williams (NZL)

Eleventh place game

5 August 2015; 10:50	Report	Canada	20–4	Kazakhstan	Kazan; Attendance: 235; Referees: Anne Grandin (FRA), Cory Williams (NZL)
5 August 2015; 10:50	Report	Score by quarters: 4–1, 5–1, 5–2, 6–0			Kazan; Attendance: 235; Referees: Anne Grandin (FRA), Cory Williams (NZL)
5 August 2015; 10:50	Report	M. Eggens 5	Goals	Mirshina 2	Kazan; Attendance: 235; Referees: Anne Grandin (FRA), Cory Williams (NZL)
