= Rachel Tseng =

Singaporean swimmer

Personal information
- Nationality: Singaporean
- Born: 3 March 1998 (age 28)

Sport
- Sport: Swimming

Rachel Tseng (born 3 March 1998) is a Singaporean swimmer. She competed in the women's 200 metre freestyle event at the 2018 FINA World Swimming Championships (25 m), in Hangzhou, China.
