= Vladislav Timakov =

Russian water polo player

Personal information
- Born: 20 July 1993 Russia
- Died: 6 September 2015 (aged 22) Bulgaria
- Height: 191 cm (6 ft 3 in)
- Weight: 115 kg (254 lb)

Sport
- Sport: water polo
Medal record
Men's water polo
Representing Russia
Universiade
Silver medal – second place	2013 Kazan	Team
- Updated on 8 August 2023

Vladislav Borisovich Timakov (Russian: Владислав Борисович Тимаков; 20 July 1993 − 6 September 2015) was a water polo player of Russia. He was part of the Russian team at the 2015 World Aquatics Championships. He died of an apparent heart attack in a pool during preseason training.

== See also ==
- Russia at the 2015 World Aquatics Championships
