= Diving at the 2015 World Aquatics Championships =

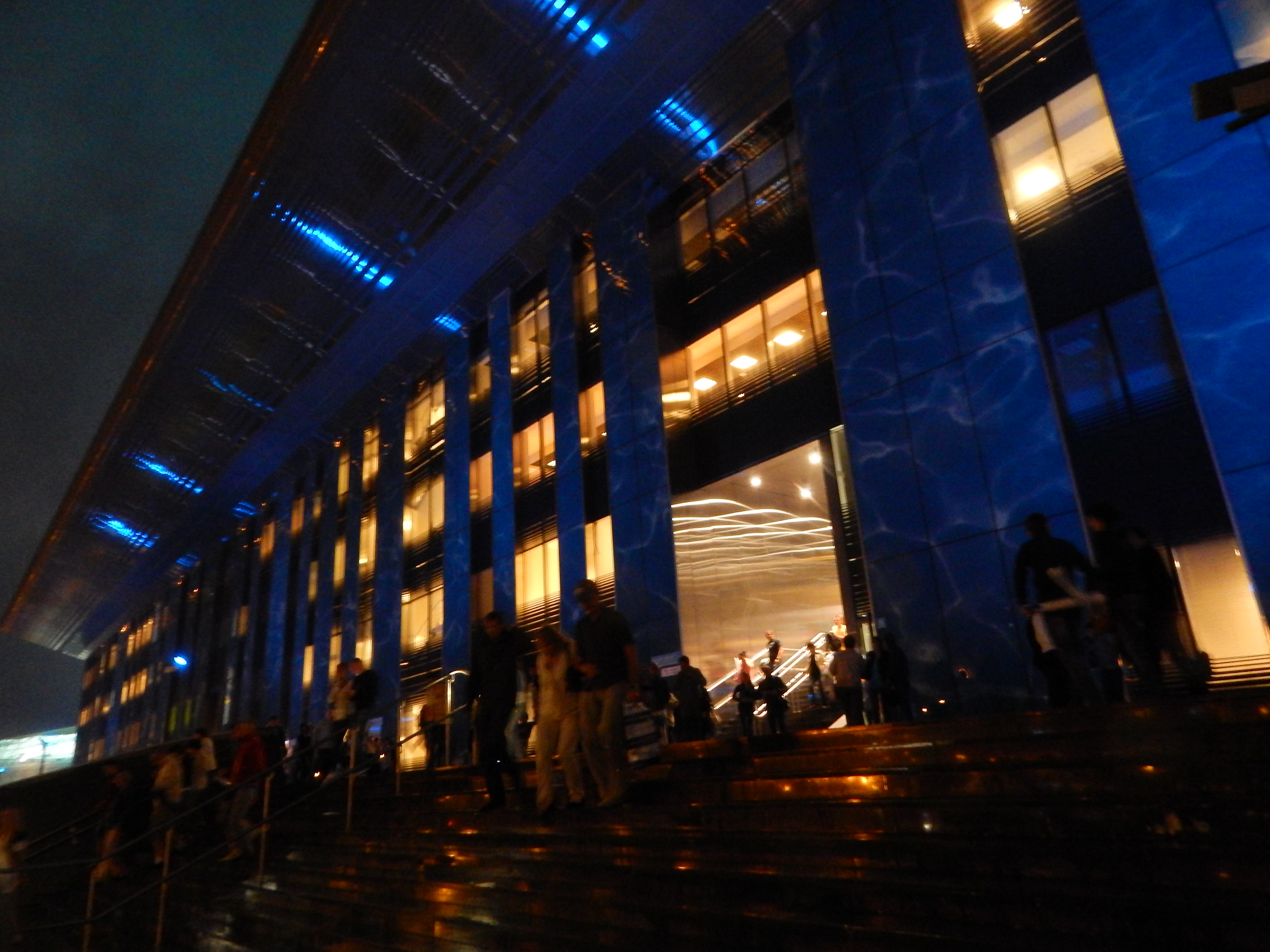
- Host city: (Russia) Kazan
- Date(s): 24 July – 2 August
- Venue(s): Palace of Water Sports
- Events: 13

Diving at the 2015 World Aquatics Championships was held between 24 July and 2 August 2015 in Kazan, Russia.

== Events ==
The following events were contested:

- 1 m springboard
- 3 m springboard
- 10 m platform
- 3 m springboard synchronized
- 10 m platform synchronized
- 3 m mixed springboard synchronized
- 10 m mixed platform synchronized
- Team event

Individual events consisted of preliminaries, semifinals and finals. The order of divers in the preliminary round was determined by computerized random selection, during the technical meeting. The 18 divers with the highest scores in the preliminaries proceeded to the semifinals.

The final consisted of the top 12 ranked divers from the semifinal.

== Schedule ==
13 events were held.

All time are local (UTC+3).

Date	Time	Event
24 July 2015	15:00	Men's 1 metre springboard preliminaries
25 July 2015	10:00	Women's Synchronized 3 metre springboard preliminaries
25 July 2015	15:00	Mixed 10 metre platform final
25 July 2015	19:30	Women's Synchronized 3 metre springboard final
26 July 2015	10:00	Men's Synchronized 10 metre platform preliminaries
26 July 2015	15:00	Women's 1 metre springboard preliminaries
26 July 2015	19:30	Men's Synchronized 10 metre platform final
27 July 2015	10:00	Women's Synchronized 10 metre platform preliminaries
27 July 2015	15:00	Men's 1 metre springboard final
27 July 2015	19:30	Women's Synchronized 10 metre platform final
28 July 2015	10:00	Men's Synchronized 3 metre springboard preliminaries
28 July 2015	15:00	Women's 1 metre springboard final
28 July 2015	19:30	Men's Synchronized 3 metre springboard final
29 July 2015	10:00	Women's 10 metre platform preliminaries
29 July 2015	15:00	Women's 10 metre platform semifinal
29 July 2015	19:30	Team event
30 July 2015	10:00	Men's 3 metre springboard preliminaries
30 July 2015	15:00	Men's 3 metre springboard semifinal
30 July 2015	19:30	Women's 10 metre platform final
31 July 2015	10:00	Women's 3 metre springboard preliminaries
31 July 2015	15:00	Women's 3 metre springboard semifinal
31 July 2015	19:30	Men's 3 metre springboard final
1 August 2015	10:00	Men's 10 metre platform preliminaries
1 August 2015	15:00	Men's 10 metre platform semifinal
1 August 2015	19:30	Women's 3 metre springboard final
2 August 2015	15:00	Mixed 3 metre springboard final
2 August 2015	19:30	Men's 10 metre platform final

== Medal summary ==
=== Medal table ===
Rank	Nation	Gold	Silver	Bronze	Total
1	China	10	3	2	15
2	Great Britain	1	0	3	4
3	Italy	1	0	2	3
4	North Korea	1	0	1	2
5	Canada	0	4	0	4
6	Russia	0	2	1	3
7	Ukraine	0	2	0	2
8	United States	0	1	1	2
9	Mexico	0	1	0	1
10	Australia	0	0	2	2
11	Malaysia	0	0	1	1
Totals (11 entries)		13	13	13	39

=== Men ===
Event	Gold		Silver		Bronze	
1 metre springboard	Xie Siyi; China	485.50	Illya Kvasha; Ukraine	449.05	Michael Hixon; United States	428.30
3 metre springboard	He Chao; China	555.05	Ilya Zakharov; Russia	547.60	Jack Laugher; Great Britain	528.90
10 metre platform	Qiu Bo; China	587.00	David Boudia; United States	560.20	Tom Daley; Great Britain	537.95
Synchronized; 3 metre springboard	China (CHN); Cao Yuan; Qin Kai	471.45	Russia (RUS); Evgeny Kuznetsov; Ilya Zakharov	459.18	Great Britain (GBR); Jack Laugher; Chris Mears	445.20
Synchronized; 10 metre platform	China (CHN); Chen Aisen; Lin Yue	495.72	Mexico (MEX); Iván García; Germán Sánchez	448.89	Russia (RUS); Roman Izmailov; Viktor Minibaev	441.33

=== Women ===
Event	Gold		Silver		Bronze	
1 metre springboard	Tania Cagnotto; Italy	310.85	Shi Tingmao; China	309.20	He Zi; China	300.30
3 metre springboard	Shi Tingmao; China	383.55	He Zi; China	377.45	Tania Cagnotto; Italy	356.15
10 metre platform	Kim Kuk-hyang; North Korea	397.05	Ren Qian; China	388.00	Pandelela Rinong; Malaysia	385.05
Synchronized; 3 metre springboard	China (CHN); Shi Tingmao; Wu Minxia	351.30	Canada (CAN); Jennifer Abel; Pamela Ware	319.47	Australia (AUS); Samantha Mills; Esther Qin	304.20
Synchronized; 10 metre platform	China (CHN); Chen Ruolin; Liu Huixia	359.52	Canada (CAN); Meaghan Benfeito; Roseline Filion	339.99	North Korea (PRK); Kim Un-hyang; Song Nam-hyang	325.26

=== Mixed ===
Event	Gold		Silver		Bronze	
3 metre springboard	China (CHN); Wang Han; Yang Hao	339.90	Canada (CAN); Jennifer Abel; François Imbeau-Dulac	317.01	Italy (ITA); Tania Cagnotto; Maicol Verzotto	315.30
10 metre platform	China (CHN); Si Yajie; Tai Xiaohu	350.88	Canada (CAN); Meaghan Benfeito; Vincent Riendeau	309.66	Australia (AUS); Domonic Bedggood; Melissa Wu	308.22
Team	Great Britain (GBR); Tom Daley; Rebecca Gallantree	434.65	Ukraine (UKR); Oleksandr Horshkovozov; Yulia Prokopchuk	426.45	China (CHN); Chen Ruolin; Xie Siyi	425.40
