= Nataliya Lovtsova =

Russian swimmer

Personal information
- Nationality: Russia
- Born: April 14, 1988 (age 38)

Sport
- Sport: Swimming
Medal record
Women's swimming
Representing Russia
European Championships (SC)
Silver medal – second place	2015 Netanya	4×50 m mixed freestyle
Bronze medal – third place	2015 Netanya	4×50 m freestyle

Nataliya Lovtsova, also romanized Natalia Lovtcova, (born 14 April 1988) is a Russian swimmer. At the 2012 Summer Olympics, she competed for the national team in the Women's 4 x 100 metre freestyle relay, finishing in 10th place in the heats, failing to reach the final. In the same year Lovtsova was suspended for two-and-a-half years after she breached anti-doping regulations.
