= Kim Un-hyang (diver) =

North Korean diver (born 1991)

Personal information
- Nationality: North Korea
- Born: 21 October 1991 (age 34) North Pyongan Province, North Korea

Sport
- Sport: Diving
- Event(s): 10m, 10 m synchro
- Partner: Choe Kum-hui

Korean name
- Hangul: 김은향
- Hanja: 金恩香
- RR: Gim Eunhyang
- MR: Kim Ŭnhyang
Medal record
Women's diving
Representing North Korea
World Championships
| Bronze medal – third place | 2015 Kazan | Sync. platform |
Asian Games
| Silver medal – second place | 2014 Incheon | Sync. platform |
| Bronze medal – third place | 2014 Incheon | 10m platform |
Summer Universiade
| Gold medal – first place | 2017 Taipei | Team |
| Gold medal – first place | 2017 Taipei | 10 m synchro |
| Silver medal – second place | 2017 Taipei | 10m platform |
| Bronze medal – third place | 2009 Belgrade | 10 m synchro |

Kim Un-hyang (Korean pronunciation: [ki.mɯn.ɦjaŋ] or [kim] [ɯn.ɦjaŋ]; born 21 October 1991 in Pyeonganbuk-do) is a North Korean diver. Her main events are 10m platform and 10m synchronized platform.

At the 2008 Summer Olympics, she competed in the 10 m platform and the synchronised 10 m platform, with Choe Kum-Hui.

She competed in the 10 metre platform event at the 2012 Summer Olympics.

She competed for the 2014 Asian Games at both women's 10m platform and synchronized platform. At the 2014 Asian Games, She won the silver medal of women's 10m synchronized platform with her partner Song Nam Hyang and the bronze medal of the individual event.

At the 2015 World Aquatics Championships, she won the bronze medal of women's 10m synchronized platform with her partner Song Nam Hyang.

She competed in the women's 10 metre platform event at the 2016 Olympics in Rio de Janeiro, coming seventh overall.
