= Song Nam-hyang =

North Korean diver

Personal information
- Born: 6 May 1996 (age 30)
- Height: 154 cm (5 ft 1 in)
- Weight: 47 kg (104 lb)

Sport
- Country: North Korea
- Event(s): Diving 10 m, 10 m synchro
- Partner: Kim Un-hyang
Medal record
World Championships
Bronze medal – third place	2015 Kazan	Synchro platform
Asian Games
Silver medal – second place	2014 Incheon	Synchro platform

Korean name
- Hangul: 송남향
- Hanja: 宋南香
- RR: Song Namhyang
- MR: Song Namhyang

Song Nam-hyang (born 6 May 1996) is a North Korean diver. Her main events are 10m platform and 10m synchronized platform. She competed for the 2014 Asian Games at both women's 10m platform and synchronized platform. At the 2014 Asian Games, She won the silver medal of women's 10m synchronized platform with her partner Kim Un-hyang and came the 6th at the individual event. At the 2015 World Aquatics Championships, she won the bronze medal of women's 10m synchronized platform with her partner Kim Un-hyang. At women's 10m platform, she came the 10th.
