= New Zealand at the 2017 World Aquatics Championships =

- Flag of New Zealand
- World Aquatics code: NZL
- National federation: Swimming New Zealand
- Website: swimmingnz.org.nz

in Budapest, Hungary
- Competitors: 30 in 5 sports
- Medals: Gold 0 Silver 0 Bronze 0 Total 0

World Aquatics Championships appearances
- 1973; 1975; 1978; 1982; 1986; 1991; 1994; 1998; 2001; 2003; 2005; 2007; 2009; 2011; 2013; 2015; 2017; 2019; 2022; 2023; 2024; 2025

New Zealand competed at the 2017 World Aquatics Championships in Budapest, Hungary, from 14 to 30 July.

== Diving ==
New Zealand entered 3 divers (one male and two female).

Men

Athlete	Event	Preliminaries		Semifinals		Final	
Athlete	Event	Points	Rank	Points	Rank	Points	Rank
Liam Stone	1 m springboard	282.65	41	—N/a		did not advance	
Liam Stone	3 m springboard	316.60	43	did not advance			

Women

Athlete	Event	Preliminaries		Semifinals		Final	
Athlete	Event	Points	Rank	Points	Rank	Points	Rank
Shaye Boddington	1 m springboard	218.60	30	—N/a		did not advance	
Elizabeth Cui	1 m springboard	241.50	19	—N/a		did not advance	
Elizabeth Cui	3 m springboard	221.70	33	did not advance			
Shaye Boddington; Elizabeth Cui	3 m synchronized springboard	218.10	19	—N/a		did not advance	

Mixed

Athlete	Event	Final	
Athlete	Event	Points	Rank
Elizabeth Cui; Liam Stone	3 m synchronized springboard	255.90	12

== Open water swimming ==
New Zealand entered one open water swimmer

Athlete	Event	Time	Rank
Charlotte Webby	Women's 5 km	1:02:07.6	38
Charlotte Webby	Women's 10 km	2:08:41.4	40

== Swimming ==
New Zealand swimmers have achieved qualifying standards in the following events (up to a maximum of 2 swimmers in each event at the A-standard entry time, and 1 at the B-standard):

Men

Athlete	Event	Heat		Semifinal		Final	
Athlete	Event	Time	Rank	Time	Rank	Time	Rank
Bradlee Ashby	200 m butterfly	2:00.53	29	did not advance			
Bradlee Ashby	200 m individual medley	2:00.20	15 Q	1:59.24 NR	13	did not advance	
Bradlee Ashby	400 m individual medley	4:20.65	23	—N/a		did not advance	
Daniel Hunter	50 m freestyle	22.71	=38	did not advance			
Daniel Hunter	50 m backstroke	26.02	37	did not advance			
Corey Main	100 m backstroke	53.97	9 Q	53.76	8 Q	53.87	8
Corey Main	200 m backstroke	1:58.34	16 Q	2:01.00	16	did not advance	
Sam Perry	50 m freestyle	22.93	=49	did not advance			
Sam Perry	100 m freestyle	50.14	51	did not advance			
Sam Perry	100 m butterfly	DNS		did not advance			
Matthew Stanley	200 m freestyle	1:48.02	29	did not advance			
Daniel Hunter; Corey Main; Sam Perry; Matthew Stanley	4×100 m freestyle relay	3:17.74	14	—N/a		did not advance	

Women

Athlete	Event	Heat		Semifinal		Final	
Athlete	Event	Time	Rank	Time	Rank	Time	Rank
Gabrielle Fa'amausili	50 m freestyle	25.38	24	did not advance			
Gabrielle Fa'amausili	100 m freestyle	56.60	35	did not advance			
Gabrielle Fa'amausili	50 m backstroke	28.47	23	did not advance			
Gabrielle Fa'amausili	100 m backstroke	1:01.80	26	did not advance			
Helena Gasson	50 m butterfly	27.37	35	did not advance			
Helena Gasson	200 m butterfly	2:13.71	27	did not advance			
Helena Gasson	200 m individual medley	2:13.91	21	did not advance			
Helena Gasson	400 m individual medley	4:49.35	23	—N/a		did not advance	
Bobbi Gichard	200 m backstroke	2:15.97	24	did not advance			
Natasha Lloyd	100 m breaststroke	1:10.11	29	did not advance			
Natasha Lloyd	200 m breaststroke	2:33.93	25	did not advance			
Emma Robinson	800 m freestyle	8:44.87	22	—N/a		did not advance	
Emma Robinson	1500 m freestyle	16:25.78	11	—N/a		did not advance	
Gabrielle Fa'amausili; Helena Gasson; Bobbi Gichard; Natasha Lloyd	4×100 m medley relay	4:07.09	12	—N/a		did not advance	

== Synchronized swimming ==
New Zealand's synchronized swimming team consisted of 3 athletes (3 female).

Women

Athlete	Event	Preliminaries		Final	
Athlete	Event	Points	Rank	Points	Rank
Aleisha Braven	Solo technical routine	64.8782	30	did not advance	
Aleisha Braven	Solo free routine	67.5333	30	did not advance	
Eva Morris; Jazzlee Thomas	Duet technical routine	66.8577	37	did not advance	
Eva Morris; Jazzlee Thomas	Duet free routine	66.4000	40	did not advance	

== Water polo ==
New Zealand qualified a women's team.

=== Women's tournament ===
Team roster

- Jessica Milicich
- Nicole Lewis
- Kelly Mason
- Ricci Ferigo
- Alexandra Boyd (C)
- Bernadette Doyle
- Emmerson Houghton
- Caitlin Lopes da Silva
- Emma Stoneman
- Casie Bowry
- Kirsten Hudson
- Brydie Pye
- Antonia Young

Group play

Pos	Team	Pld	W	D	L	GF	GA	GD	Pts	Qualification
1	United States	3	3	0	0	58	17	+41	6	Quarterfinals
2	Spain	3	2	0	1	35	17	+18	4	Playoffs
3	New Zealand	3	1	0	2	17	38	−21	2	Playoffs
4	South Africa	3	0	0	3	11	49	−38	0	

Updated to match(es) played on 20 July 2017. Source: Sportresult
Rules for classification: 1) points; 2) head-to-head points; 3) head-to-head goal difference; 4) head-to-head number of goals scored; 5) Goal difference.

16 July 2017; 12:10	Report	New Zealand	2–10	Spain	Alfréd Hajós National Swimming Stadium, Budapest; Referees: Viktor Salnichenko (KAZ), Péter Molnár (HUN)
16 July 2017; 12:10	Report	Score by quarters: 0–3, 1–1, 0–2, 1–4			Alfréd Hajós National Swimming Stadium, Budapest; Referees: Viktor Salnichenko (KAZ), Péter Molnár (HUN)
16 July 2017; 12:10	Report	Lopes da Silva, Mason 1	Goals	Leiton 3	Alfréd Hajós National Swimming Stadium, Budapest; Referees: Viktor Salnichenko (KAZ), Péter Molnár (HUN)

18 July 2017; 10:50	Report	New Zealand	8–6	South Africa	Alfréd Hajós National Swimming Stadium, Budapest; Referees: Diego Garibaldi (ARG), Benjamin Mercier (FRA)
18 July 2017; 10:50	Report	Score by quarters: 2–1, 1–2, 1–1, 4–2			Alfréd Hajós National Swimming Stadium, Budapest; Referees: Diego Garibaldi (ARG), Benjamin Mercier (FRA)
18 July 2017; 10:50	Report	Hudson, Mason 3	Goals	Schooling 2	Alfréd Hajós National Swimming Stadium, Budapest; Referees: Diego Garibaldi (ARG), Benjamin Mercier (FRA)

20 July 2017; 18:50	Report	New Zealand	7–22	United States	Alfréd Hajós National Swimming Stadium, Budapest; Referees: Diego Garibaldi (ARG), Yosuke Kajiwarra (JPN)
20 July 2017; 18:50	Report	Score by quarters: 2–6, 1–6, 2–6, 2–4			Alfréd Hajós National Swimming Stadium, Budapest; Referees: Diego Garibaldi (ARG), Yosuke Kajiwarra (JPN)
20 July 2017; 18:50	Report	Pye, Stoneman 2	Goals	Steffens 5	Alfréd Hajós National Swimming Stadium, Budapest; Referees: Diego Garibaldi (ARG), Yosuke Kajiwarra (JPN)

Playoffs

22 July 2017; 17:30	Report	Canada	16–3	New Zealand	Alfréd Hajós National Swimming Stadium, Budapest; Referees: Natacha Florestano (BRA), Viktor Salnichenko (KAZ)
22 July 2017; 17:30	Report	Score by quarters: 5–1, 4–1, 3–0, 4–1			Alfréd Hajós National Swimming Stadium, Budapest; Referees: Natacha Florestano (BRA), Viktor Salnichenko (KAZ)
22 July 2017; 17:30	Report	Békhazi 4	Goals	three players 1	Alfréd Hajós National Swimming Stadium, Budapest; Referees: Natacha Florestano (BRA), Viktor Salnichenko (KAZ)

9th–12th place semifinals

24 July 2017; 12:10	Report	New Zealand	4–19	Netherlands	Alfréd Hajós National Swimming Stadium, Budapest; Referees: Diego Garibaldi (ARG), Yosuke Kajiwara (JPN)
24 July 2017; 12:10	Report	Score by quarters: 1–5, 1–6, 1–3, 1–5			Alfréd Hajós National Swimming Stadium, Budapest; Referees: Diego Garibaldi (ARG), Yosuke Kajiwara (JPN)
24 July 2017; 12:10	Report	four players 1	Goals	four players 3	Alfréd Hajós National Swimming Stadium, Budapest; Referees: Diego Garibaldi (ARG), Yosuke Kajiwara (JPN)

Eleventh place game

26 July 2017; 10:30	Report	New Zealand	7–9	France	Alfréd Hajós National Swimming Stadium, Budapest; Referees: Diego Garibaldi (ARG), Yosuke Kajiwara (JPN)
26 July 2017; 10:30	Report	Score by quarters: 1–0, 2–2, 1–5, 3–2			Alfréd Hajós National Swimming Stadium, Budapest; Referees: Diego Garibaldi (ARG), Yosuke Kajiwara (JPN)
26 July 2017; 10:30	Report	Lopes da Silva, Mason 2	Goals	Daule, Guillet 2	Alfréd Hajós National Swimming Stadium, Budapest; Referees: Diego Garibaldi (ARG), Yosuke Kajiwara (JPN)
