= Swimming at the 2017 World Aquatics Championships – Women's 4 × 100 metre medley relay =

Women's 4 × 100 metre medley relay at the 2017 World Aquatics Championships
- Venue: Danube Arena
- Location: Budapest, Hungary
- Dates: 30 July (heats and final)
- Competitors: 83 from 17 nations
- Teams: 17
- Winning time: 3:51.55 WR

Medalists
gold medal	Kathleen Baker; Lilly King; Kelsi Worrell; Simone Manuel; Olivia Smoliga; Katie Meili; Sarah Gibson; Mallory Comerford	United States
silver medal	Anastasia Fesikova; Yuliya Yefimova; Svetlana Chimrova; Veronika Popova; Natalia Ivaneeva	Russia
bronze medal	Emily Seebohm; Taylor McKeown; Emma McKeon; Bronte Campbell; Holly Barratt; Jessica Hansen; Brianna Throssell; Shayna Jack	Australia

The Women's 4 × 100 metre medley relay competition at the 2017 World Championships was held on 30 July 2017.

== Records ==
Prior to the competition, the existing world and championship records were as follows.

World record	United States	3:52.05	London, Great Britain	4 August 2012
Competition record	China	3:52.19	Rome, Italy	1 August 2009

The following new records were set during this competition.

Date	Event	Nation	Time	Record
30 July	Final	United States	3:51.55	WR

== Results ==
=== Heats ===
The heats were held at 10:14.

Rank	Heat	Lane	Nation	Swimmers	Time	Notes
1	2	4	United States	Olivia Smoliga (59.52); Katie Meili (1:05.17); Sarah Gibson (58.36); Mallory Comerford (52.90)	3:55.95	Q
2	2	5	China	Fu Yuanhui (1:00.04); Shi Jinglin (1:06.55); Zhang Yufei (57.50); Zhu Menghui (53.03)	3:57.12	Q
3	1	5	Canada	Kylie Masse (58.86); Kierra Smith (1:07.20); Rebecca Smith (57.75); Sandrine Mainville (53.36)	3:57.17	Q
4	2	3	Russia	Anastasia Fesikova (59.61); Natalia Ivaneeva (1:06.89); Svetlana Chimrova (57.62); Veronika Popova (53.41)	3:57.53	Q
5	1	4	Australia	Holly Barratt (59.68); Jessica Hansen (1:07.10); Brianna Throssell (58.52); Shayna Jack (53.44)	3:58.74	Q
6	2	6	Italy	Margherita Panziera (1:01.04); Arianna Castiglioni (1:06.99); Ilaria Bianchi (57.56); Federica Pellegrini (54.44)	4:00.03	Q
7	2	8	Sweden	Ida Lindborg (1:01.24); Sophie Hansson (1:08.62); Louise Hansson (58.29); Michelle Coleman (53.29)	4:01.44	Q
8	1	3	Great Britain	Georgia Davies (1:00.23); Sarah Vasey (1:07.96); Alys Thomas (59.84); Freya Anderson (53.75)	4:01.78	Q
9	2	2	Czech Republic	Simona Baumrtová (1:00.13); Martina Moravčíková (1:07.76); Lucie Svěcená (59.18); Anna Kolářová (55.16)	4:02.23	NR
10	1	2	Hungary	Katalin Burián (1:00.62); Anna Sztankovics (1:08.75); Liliána Szilágyi (58.32); Flóra Molnár (55.39)	4:03.08	NR
11	1	8	Finland	Mimosa Jallow (1:01.43); Jenna Laukkanen (1:07.06); Kaisla Kollanus (1:02.43); Lotta Nevalainen (55.46)	4:06.38	
12	2	1	New Zealand	Bobbi Gichard (1:01.63); Natasha Lloyd (1:09.35); Helena Gasson (1:00.31); Gabrielle Fa'amausili (55.80)	4:07.09	
13	1	6	Hong Kong	Claudia Lau (1:02.56); Siobhán Haughey (1:07.62); Chan Kin Lok (1:00.22); Sze Hang Yu (57.00)	4:07.40	
14	1	7	Israel	Andrea Murez (1:02.45); Amit Ivry (1:11.27); Keren Siebner (59.65); Zohar Shikler (56.98)	4:10.35	
15	1	1	Slovakia	Karolina Hájková (1:03.57); Andrea Podmaníková (1:10.86); Barbora Mišendová (1:01.62); Katarína Listopadová (55.98)	4:12.03	
16	2	0	Mexico	Fernanda González (1:02.25); Esther González (1:10.86); María José Mata (1:02.41); Liliana Ibáñez (56.52)	4:12.04	
17	2	7	South Africa	Samantha Randle (1:05.85); Kaylene Corbett (1:10.65); Erin Gallagher (1:01.58); Emma Chellius (57.39)	4:15.47	

=== Final ===
The final was held at 19:07.

Rank	Lane	Nation	Swimmers	Time	Notes
1st place, gold medalist(s)	4	United States	Kathleen Baker (58.54); Lilly King (1:04.48); Kelsi Worrell (56.30); Simone Manuel (52.23)	3:51.55	WR
2nd place, silver medalist(s)	6	Russia	Anastasia Fesikova (58.96); Yuliya Yefimova (1:04.03); Svetlana Chimrova (56.99); Veronika Popova (53.40)	3:53.38	ER
3rd place, bronze medalist(s)	2	Australia	Emily Seebohm (58.53); Taylor McKeown (1:06.29); Emma McKeon (56.78); Bronte Campbell (52.69)	3:54.29	
4	3	Canada	Kylie Masse (58.31); Kierra Smith (1:06.57); Penny Oleksiak (56.90); Chantal Van Landeghem (53.08)	3:54.86	NR
5	1	Sweden	Ida Lindborg (1:01.56); Jennie Johansson (1:05.76); Sarah Sjöström (55.03); Michelle Coleman (52.93)	3:55.28	
6	5	China	Fu Yuanhui (1:00.52); Shi Jinglin (1:06.16); Zhang Yufei (57.39); Zhu Menghui (53.62)	3:57.69	
7	8	Great Britain	Kathleen Dawson (1:00.24); Sarah Vasey (1:07.06); Charlotte Atkinson (58.29); Freya Anderson (53.92)	3:59.51	
8	7	Italy	Margherita Panziera (1:01.12); Arianna Castiglioni (1:06.55); Ilaria Bianchi (57.64); Federica Pellegrini (54.67)	3:59.98	
