= Swimming at the 2017 World Aquatics Championships – Men's 400 metre individual medley =

Men's 400 metre individual medley at the 2017 World Aquatics Championships
- Venue: Danube Arena
- Location: Budapest, Hungary
- Dates: 30 July (heats and final)
- Competitors: 37 from 32 nations
- Winning time: 4:05.90

Medalists
gold medal	Chase Kalisz	United States
silver medal	Dávid Verrasztó	Hungary
bronze medal	Daiya Seto	Japan

The Men's 400 metre individual medley competition at the 2017 World Championships was held on 30 July 2017.

== Records ==
Prior to the competition, the existing world and championship records were as follows.

World record	Michael Phelps (USA)	4:03.84	Beijing, China	10 August 2008
Competition record	Michael Phelps (USA)	4:06.22	Melbourne, Australia	1 April 2007

The following new records were set during this competition.

Date	Event	Name	Nationality	Time	Record
30 July	Final	Chase Kalisz	United States	4:05.90	CR

== Results ==
=== Heats ===
The heats were held at 09:50.

Rank	Heat	Lane	Name	Nationality	Time	Notes
1	3	4	Chase Kalisz	United States	4:09.79	Q
2	3	3	Max Litchfield	Great Britain	4:10.57	Q, NR
3	4	5	Dávid Verrasztó	Hungary	4:11.89	Q
4	3	5	Daiya Seto	Japan	4:12.89	Q
5	3	6	Brandonn Almeida	Brazil	4:13.13	Q
6	4	3	Jay Litherland	United States	4:13.95	Q
7	4	4	Kosuke Hagino	Japan	4:14.15	Q
8	3	1	Richard Nagy	Slovakia	4:15.69	Q
9	4	8	Mark Szaranek	Great Britain	4:15.71	
10	4	1	Joan Lluís Pons	Spain	4:16.27	
11	3	8	Alexis Santos	Portugal	4:17.34	
12	2	6	Tomas Peribonio	Ecuador	4:17.37	NR
13	3	7	Jacob Heidtmann	Germany	4:17.68	
14	4	6	Federico Turrini	Italy	4:18.25	
15	4	7	Jérémy Desplanches	Switzerland	4:18.69	
16	2	7	Patrick Stäber	Austria	4:19.15	
17	4	9	Tristan Cote	Canada	4:19.87	
18	3	2	Gergely Gyurta	Hungary	4:19.90	
19	4	2	Wang Shun	China	4:20.01	
20	2	8	Ayrton Sweeney	South Africa	4:20.10	
21	4	0	Clyde Lewis	Australia	4:20.34	
22	2	4	Dawid Szwedzki	Poland	4:20.48	
23	2	3	Bradlee Ashby	New Zealand	4:20.65	
24	2	0	Anton Ipsen	Denmark	4:20.74	
25	2	5	Pavel Janeček	Czech Republic	4:22.11	
26	2	2	Christoph Meier	Liechtenstein	4:22.29	
27	3	9	Etay Gurevich	Israel	4:22.66	
28	1	3	Ahmed Hamdy	Egypt	4:25.16	
28	1	4	Cho Cheng-chi	Chinese Taipei	4:25.16	
30	1	8	Nguyễn Hữu Kim Sơn	Vietnam	4:26.07	
31	3	0	Wang Zhou	China	4:28.25	
32	1	5	Ricardo Vargas	Mexico	4:30.37	
33	1	2	Luis Vega Torres	Cuba	4:30.77	
34	2	9	Joo Jae-gu	South Korea	4:31.14	
35	1	7	Thomas Tsiopanis	Cyprus	4:34.49	
36	1	1	Brandon Schuster	Samoa	4:34.60	NR
37	1	0	Mubal Azzam Ibrahim	Maldives	5:48.11	NR
	1	6	Jonathan Gómez	Colombia	DNS	
	2	1	Carlos Omaña	Venezuela	DNS	

=== Final ===
The final was held at 17:39.

Rank	Lane	Name	Nationality	Time	Notes
1st place, gold medalist(s)	4	Chase Kalisz	United States	4:05.90	CR
2nd place, silver medalist(s)	3	Dávid Verrasztó	Hungary	4:08.38	
3rd place, bronze medalist(s)	6	Daiya Seto	Japan	4:09.14	
4	5	Max Litchfield	Great Britain	4:09.62	NR
5	7	Jay Litherland	United States	4:12.05	
6	1	Kosuke Hagino	Japan	4:12.65	
7	2	Brandonn Almeida	Brazil	4:13.00	
8	8	Richard Nagy	Slovakia	4:16.33	
