= Synchronized swimming at the 2017 World Aquatics Championships – Duet free routine =

Duet free routine at the 2017 World Aquatics Championships
- Venue: City Park
- Location: Budapest, Hungary
- Dates: 18 July (preliminaries); 20 July (final)
- Competitors: 86 from 43 nations
- Teams: 43
- Winning points: 97.0000

Medalists
gold medal	Svetlana Kolesnichenko; Alexandra Patskevich	Russia
silver medal	Jiang Tingting; Jiang Wenwen	China
bronze medal	Anna Voloshyna; Yelyzaveta Yakhno	Ukraine

The Duet free routine competition at the 2017 World Championships was held on 18 and 20 July 2017.

== Results ==
The preliminary round was started on 18 July at 19:00. The final was held on 20 July at 11:00.

Green denotes finalists

Rank	Nation	Swimmers	Preliminary		Final	
Rank	Nation	Swimmers	Points	Rank	Points	Rank
1st place, gold medalist(s)	Russia	Svetlana Kolesnichenko; Alexandra Patskevich	96.6333	1	97.0000	1
2nd place, silver medalist(s)	China	Jiang Tingting; Jiang Wenwen	94.9333	2	95.3000	2
3rd place, bronze medalist(s)	Ukraine	Anna Voloshyna; Yelyzaveta Yakhno	92.8333	3	93.2667	3
4	Japan	Yukiko Inui; Kanami Nakamaki	92.6000	4	93.1333	4
5	Spain	Ona Carbonell; Paula Ramírez	91.3667	5	91.7333	5
6	Italy	Linda Cerruti; Costanza Ferro	90.7000	6	90.5667	6
7	Canada	Claudia Holzner; Jacqueline Simoneau	88.9667	7	89.0000	7
8	Greece	Evangelia Papazoglou; Evangelia Platanioti	87.3000	8	87.6333	8
9	Austria	Anna-Maria Alexandri; Eirini-Marina Alexandri	86.6333	9	86.7000	9
10	Mexico	Karem Achach; Nuria Diosdado	86.4333	10	86.5333	10
11	United States	Anita Alvarez; Victoria Woroniecki	84.3000	11	84.1333	11
12	Kazakhstan	Alexandra Nemich; Yekaterina Nemich	84.2000	12	83.9000	12
13	North Korea	Jang Hyon-ok; Min Hae-yon	83.7667	13	Did not advance	
14	France	Marie Annequin; Solene Lusseau	83.6000	14	Did not advance	
15	Brazil	Luisa Borges; Maria Clara Coutinho	82.8333	15	Did not advance	
16	Great Britain	Kate Shortman; Isabelle Thorpe	82.5667	16	Did not advance	
17	Belarus	Iryna Limanouskaya; Veronika Yesipovich	82.5333	17	Did not advance	
18	Netherlands	Bregje de Brouwer; Noortje de Brouwer	80.2000	18	Did not advance	
19	Germany	Marlene Bojer; Daniela Reinhardt	79.9667	19	Did not advance	
20	Hungary	Szofi Kiss; Dóra Schwarcz	79.8333	20	Did not advance	
21	Colombia	Estefanía Álvarez; Mónica Arango	79.8000	21	Did not advance	
22	Switzerland	Maxence Bellina; Maria Piffaretti	79.7333	22	Did not advance	
23	Czech Republic	Alžběta Dufková; Sabina Langerová	79.2667	23	Did not advance	
24	Argentina	Camila Arregui; Trinidad López	76.7000	24	Did not advance	
25	Liechtenstein	Lara Mechnig; Marluce Schierscher	76.5000	25	Did not advance	
26	Turkey	Defne Bakırcı; Mısra Gündeş	76.4667	26	Did not advance	
27	South Korea	Lee Ri-young; Uhm Ji-wan	76.4000	27	Did not advance	
28	Singapore	Debbie Soh; Miya Yong	76.0000	28	Did not advance	
29	Slovakia	Petra Ďurišová; Diana Miškechová	75.8000	29	Did not advance	
30	Egypt	Samia Hagrass; Dara Tamer	75.5667	30	Did not advance	
31	Israel	Eden Blecher; Yael Polka	75.2000	31	Did not advance	
32	Malaysia	Gan Hua Wei; Lee Lee Yhing Huey	73.7333	32	Did not advance	
33	Serbia	Nevena Dimitrijević; Jelena Kontić	73.0667	33	Did not advance	
34	Chile	Bianca Consigliere; Isidora Letelier	72.3667	34	Did not advance	
35	Poland	Julia Mikołajczak; Swietłana Szczepańska	72.2333	35	Did not advance	
36	Bulgaria	Daniela Bozadzhieva; Hristina Damyanova	72.0667	36	Did not advance	
37	Portugal	Maria Gonçalves; Cheila Vieira	70.8667	37	Did not advance	
38	Costa Rica	Fiorella Calvo; Natalia Jenkins	70.5667	38	Did not advance	
39	South Africa	Emma Manners-Wood; Laura Strugnell	67.4667	39	Did not advance	
40	New Zealand	Eva Morris; Jazzlee Thomas	66.4000	40	Did not advance	
41	Hong Kong	Haruka Kawazoe; Christie Poon	65.7333	41	Did not advance	
42	Cuba	Melissa Alonso; Carelys Valdes	64.9333	42	Did not advance	
43	Philippines	Allyssa Salvador; Jemimah Tiambeng	57.5333	43	Did not advance	
