= Great Britain at the 2017 World Aquatics Championships =

- Flag of Great Britain
- World Aquatics code: GBR
- National federation: British Swimming
- Website: https://www.britishswimming.org

in Budapest, Hungary
- Competitors: 51 in 4 sports
- Medals Ranked 5th: Gold 5 Silver 3 Bronze 3 Total 11

World Aquatics Championships appearances
- 1973; 1975; 1978; 1982; 1986; 1991; 1994; 1998; 2001; 2003; 2005; 2007; 2009; 2011; 2013; 2015; 2017; 2019; 2022; 2023; 2024; 2025

Great Britain is scheduled to compete at the 2017 World Aquatics Championships in Budapest, Hungary from 14 July to 30 July.

== Medalists ==
Medal	Name	Sport	Event	Date
Gold	Tom Daley	Diving	Men's 10 m platform	July 22
Gold	Adam Peaty	Swimming	Men's 100 m breaststroke	July 24
Gold	Ben Proud	Swimming	Men's 50 m butterfly	July 24
Gold	Adam Peaty	Swimming	Men's 50 m breaststroke	July 26
Gold	Nick Grainger; James Guy; Calum Jarvis*; Stephen Milne; Duncan Scott	Swimming	Men's 4 × 200 m freestyle relay	July 28
Silver	Lois Toulson; Matthew Lee	Diving	Mixed 10 m synchronized platform	July 15
Silver	Grace Reid; Tom Daley	Diving	Mixed 3 m synchronized springboard	July 22
Silver	James Guy; Ross Murdoch*; Adam Peaty; Duncan Scott; Chris Walker-Hebborn	Swimming	Men's 4 × 100 m medley relay	July 30
Bronze	Timothy Shuttleworth	Open water swimming	Men's 5 km	July 15
Bronze	Ben Proud	Swimming	Men's 50 m freestyle	July 29
Bronze	James Guy	Swimming	Men's 100 m butterfly	July 29

== Diving ==
Great Britain has entered 12 divers (seven male and five female).

Men

Athlete	Event	Preliminaries		Semifinals		Final	
Athlete	Event	Points	Rank	Points	Rank	Points	Rank
Ross Haslam	1 m springboard	367.60	8 Q	—N/a		357.90	10
James Heatly	1 m springboard	364.00	9 Q	—N/a		374.50	9
Ross Haslam	3 m springboard	425.70	11 Q	433.00	10 Q	452.90	11
Jack Laugher	3 m springboard	477.85	3 Q	498.75	2 Q	500.65	5
Tom Daley	10 m platform	515.10	3 Q	498.65	2 Q	590.95	1st place, gold medalist(s)
Matthew Lee	10 m platform	445.40	7 Q	472.35	5 Q	423.55	12
Jack Laugher; Chris Mears	3 m synchronized springboard	401.88	5 Q	—N/a		418.20	4
Tom Daley; Daniel Goodfellow	10 m synchronized platform	433.14	2 Q	—N/a		418.02	4

Women

Athlete	Event	Preliminaries		Semifinals		Final	
Athlete	Event	Points	Rank	Points	Rank	Points	Rank
Katherine Torrance	1 m springboard	255.60	8 Q	—N/a		275.90	9
Grace Reid	3 m springboard	284.00	14 Q	309.60	8 Q	336.70	4
Katherine Torrance	3 m springboard	245.50	26	Did not advance			
Robyn Birch	10 m platform	311.60	10 Q	294.00	16	Did not advance	
Lois Toulson	10 m platform	278.60	23	Did not advance			
Grace Reid; Katherine Torrance	3 m synchronized springboard	271.20	8 Q	—N/a		294.60	5
Tonia Couch; Lois Toulson	10 m synchronized platform	283.68	9 Q	—N/a		300.48	7

Mixed

Athlete	Event	Final	
Athlete	Event	Points	Rank
Grace Reid; Tom Daley	3 m synchronized springboard	308.04	2nd place, silver medalist(s)
Lois Toulson; Matthew Lee	10 m synchronized platform	323.28	2nd place, silver medalist(s)
Robyn Birch; Daniel Goodfellow	Team	303.15	13

== High diving ==
Great Britain qualified three male high divers.

Athlete	Event	Points	Rank
Blake Aldridge	Muhammad lsmail	342.25	9
Gary Hunt	Muhammad lsmail	356.40	5
Owen Weymouth	Muhammad lsmail	189.65	22

== Open water swimming ==
Great Britain has entered six open water swimmers

Athlete	Event	Time	Rank
Jack Burnell	Men's 10 km	1:52:00.8	4
Caleb Hughes	Men's 10 km	1:52:37.0	24
Tobias Robinson	Men's 5 km	54:57.1	15
Timothy Shuttleworth	Men's 5 km	54:42.1	3rd place, bronze medalist(s)
Alice Dearing	Women's 5 km	Did not start	
Alice Dearing	Women's 10 km	2:04:24.4	25
Danielle Huskisson	Women's 5 km	Did not start	
Danielle Huskisson	Women's 10 km	2:01:06.1	11
Alice Dearing; Danielle Huskisson; Jack Burnell; Tobias Robinson	Mixed team	54:51.1	5

== Swimming ==
British swimmers have achieved qualifying standards in the following events (up to a maximum of 2 swimmers in each event at the A-standard entry time, and 1 at the B-standard):

Men

Athlete	Event	Heat		Semifinal		Final	
Athlete	Event	Time	Rank	Time	Rank	Time	Rank
James Guy	200 m freestyle	1:46.22	2 Q	1:45.18	2 Q	1:45.36	5
James Guy	400 m freestyle	3:45.64	6 Q	—N/a		3:45.58	6
James Guy	100 m butterfly	51.16 NR	2 Q	50.67 NR	2 Q	50.83	3rd place, bronze medalist(s)
Luke Greenbank	200 m backstroke	1:57.67	=10 Q	1:58.50	13	Did not advance	
Daniel Jervis	1500 m freestyle	15:07.97	18	—N/a		Did not advance	
Max Litchfield	200 m individual medley	1:56.64 NR	3 Q	1:56.70	3 Q	1:56.86	4
Max Litchfield	400 m individual medley	4:10.57 NR	2 Q	—N/a		4:09.62 NR	4
Stephen Milne	400 m freestyle	3:48.64	15	—N/a		Did not advance	
Ross Murdoch	100 m breaststroke	59.51	7 Q	59.23	7 Q	59.45	8
Ross Murdoch	200 m breaststroke	2:08.98	2 Q	2:07.72	3 Q	2:08.12	4
Adam Peaty	50 m breaststroke	26.10 WR	1 Q	25.95 WR	1 Q	25.99	1st place, gold medalist(s)
Adam Peaty	100 m breaststroke	58.21	1 Q	57.75 CR	1 Q	57.47 CR	1st place, gold medalist(s)
Benjamin Proud	50 m freestyle	21.93	6 Q	21.60	=3 Q	21.43	3rd place, bronze medalist(s)
Benjamin Proud	50 m butterfly	23.11	4 Q	22.92	6 Q	22.75 NR	1st place, gold medalist(s)
Duncan Scott	100 m freestyle	48.46	5 Q	48.10	6 Q	48.11	=5
Duncan Scott	200 m freestyle	1:46.62	7 Q	1:45.16	1 Q	1:45.27	4
Mark Szaranek	200 m individual medley	1:59.38	13 Q	1:58.80	11	Did not advance	
Mark Szaranek	400 m individual medley	4:15.71	9	—N/a		Did not advance	
James Wilby	200 m breaststroke	2:11.51	18	Did not advance			
Nick Grainger; James Guy; Calum Jarvis*; Stephen Milne; Duncan Scott	4 × 200 m freestyle relay	7:05.79	2 Q	—N/a		7:01.70 NR	1st place, gold medalist(s)
James Guy; Ross Murdoch*; Adam Peaty; Duncan Scott; Chris Walker-Hebborn	4 × 100 m medley relay	3:32.35	4 Q	—N/a		3:28.95 NR	2nd place, silver medalist(s)

Women

Athlete	Event	Heat		Semifinal		Final	
Athlete	Event	Time	Rank	Time	Rank	Time	Rank
Freya Anderson	100 m freestyle	54.25	14 Q	53.91	12	Did not advance	
Charlotte Atkinson	100 m butterfly	59.04	23	Did not advance			
Charlotte Atkinson	200 m butterfly	2:10.68	21	Did not advance			
Kathleen Dawson	50 m backstroke	28.42	=19	Did not advance			
Kathleen Dawson	100 m backstroke	59.88	=8 Q	59.82	8 Q	59.90	8
Georgia Davies	50 m backstroke	27.73	4 Q	27.49	4 Q	27.61	8
Georgia Davies	100 m backstroke	1:00.24	10 Q	59.94	10	Did not advance	
Holly Hibbott	400 m freestyle	4:12.77	15	—N/a		Did not advance	
Holly Hibbott	800 m freestyle	8:30.66	8 Q	—N/a		8:38.63	8
Hannah Miley	200 m individual medley	2:11.32	6 Q	2:11.20	9	Did not advance	
Hannah Miley	400 m individual medley	4:37.14	8 Q	—N/a		4:38.34	8
Siobhan-Marie O'Connor	100 m breaststroke	1:07.33	12 Q	DNS		Did not advance	
Siobhan-Marie O'Connor	200 m individual medley	2:10.42	4 Q	2:09.72	4 Q	2:10.41	7
Molly Renshaw	200 m breaststroke	2:24.03	1 Q	2:23.51	7 Q	2:22.96	6
Rosie Rudin	200 m backstroke	2:13.27	21	Did not advance			
Alys Thomas	50 m butterfly	DNS		Did not advance			
Alys Thomas	100 m butterfly	58.65	15 Q	58.21	=12	Did not advance	
Alys Thomas	200 m butterfly	2:09.13	14 Q	2:08.72	13	Did not advance	
Jocelyn Ulyett	200 m breaststroke	2:26.50	14 Q	2:23.82	9	Did not advance	
Sarah Vasey	50 m breaststroke	30.71	8 Q	30.46	=6 Q	30.62	6
Sarah Vasey	100 m breaststroke	1:07.20	=10 Q	1:06.81	8 Q	1:07.19	8
Abbie Wood	400 m individual medley	4:47.30	20	—N/a		Did not advance	
Charlotte Atkinson; Freya Anderson; Georgia Davies*; Kathleen Dawson; Alys Thomas*; Sarah Vasey	4 × 100 m medley relay	4:01.78	8 Q	—N/a		3:59.51	7

Mixed

Athlete	Event	Heat		Final	
Athlete	Event	Time	Rank	Time	Rank
James Guy; Ross Murdoch*; Adam Peaty; Freya Anderson*; Georgia Davies; Siobhan-Marie O'Connor	4 × 100 m medley relay	3:44.79	4 Q	3:41.56 EU	5

== Synchronized swimming ==
Great Britain's synchronized swimming team consisted of 2 athletes (2 female).

Women

Athlete	Event	Preliminaries		Final	
Athlete	Event	Points	Rank	Points	Rank
Kate Shortman	Solo free routine	83.4667	12 Q	82.3667	12
Kate Shortman; Isabelle Thorpe	Duet free routine	82.5667	16	Did not advance	
