= Synchronized swimming at the 2017 World Aquatics Championships – Solo free routine =

Solo free routine at the 2017 World Aquatics Championships
- Venue: City Park
- Location: Budapest, Hungary
- Dates: 17 July (preliminaries); 19 July (final)
- Competitors: 32 from 32 nations
- Winning points: 96.1333

Medalists
gold medal	Svetlana Kolesnichenko	Russia
silver medal	Ona Carbonell	Spain
bronze medal	Anna Voloshyna	Ukraine

The Solo free routine competition at the 2017 World Championships was held on 17 and 19 July 2017.

== Results ==
The preliminary round was started on 17 July at 19:00. The final was held on 19 July at 11:00.

Green denotes finalists

Rank	Swimmer	Nationality	Preliminary		Final	
Rank	Swimmer	Nationality	Points	Rank	Points	Rank
1st place, gold medalist(s)	Svetlana Kolesnichenko	Russia	95.5000	1	96.1333	1
2nd place, silver medalist(s)	Ona Carbonell	Spain	94.1667	2	95.0333	2
3rd place, bronze medalist(s)	Anna Voloshyna	Ukraine	92.8667	3	93.3000	3
4	Yukiko Inui	Japan	91.9667	4	92.0667	4
5	Linda Cerruti	Italy	89.6000	6	90.6000	5
6	Jacqueline Simoneau	Canada	89.8333	5	90.1333	6
7	Evangelia Platanioti	Greece	87.8000	7	88.0000	7
8	Vasiliki Alexandri	Austria	85.3000	8	86.3333	8
9	Eve Planeix	France	84.7667	9	84.6000	9
10	Vasilina Khandoshka	Belarus	84.2000	10	83.7667	10
11	Min Hae-yon	North Korea	84.1667	11	82.9000	11
12	Kate Shortman	Great Britain	83.4667	12	82.3667	12
13	Lara Mechning	Liechtenstein	82.8667	13	did not advance	
14	Vivienne Koch	Switzerland	82.2000	14	did not advance	
15	Maria Clara Coutinho	Brazil	80.1333	15	did not advance	
16	Marlene Bojer	Germany	79.6000	16	did not advance	
17	Szofi Kiss	Hungary	79.4000	17	did not advance	
18	Yael Polka	Israel	77.9000	18	did not advance	
19	Lee Ri-young	South Korea	77.8000	19	did not advance	
20	Defne Bakırcı	Turkey	77.3000	20	did not advance	
21	Debbie Soh	Singapore	75.6000	21	did not advance	
22	Dara Tamer	Egypt	75.5667	22	did not advance	
23	Bianca Consigliere	Chile	73.1000	23	did not advance	
24	Nevena Dimitrijević	Serbia	72.7333	24	did not advance	
25	Kyra Hoevertsz	Aruba	72.7000	25	did not advance	
26	Hristina Damyanova	Bulgaria	72.3667	26	did not advance	
27	Lee Lee Yhing Huey	Malaysia	72.2667	27	did not advance	
28	Swietłana Szczepańska	Poland	72.0333	28	did not advance	
29	Malin Gerdin	Sweden	72.0333	29	did not advance	
30	Aleisha Braven	New Zealand	67.5333	30	did not advance	
31	Bianca Benavides	Costa Rica	67.3333	31	did not advance	
32	Melissa Alonso	Cuba	66.7000	32	did not advance	
