= Poland at the 2017 World Aquatics Championships =

- Flag of Poland
- World Aquatics code: POL
- National federation: Polski Związek Pływacki
- Website: www.kppzp.pl

in Budapest, Hungary
- Competitors: 27 in 5 sports
- Medals Ranked 22nd: Gold 0 Silver 1 Bronze 0 Total 1

World Aquatics Championships appearances
- 1973; 1975; 1978; 1982; 1986; 1991; 1994; 1998; 2001; 2003; 2005; 2007; 2009; 2011; 2013; 2015; 2017; 2019; 2022; 2023; 2024; 2025

Poland competed at the 2017 World Aquatics Championships in Budapest, Hungary from 14 July to 30 July.

== Medalists ==
Medal	Name	Sport	Event	Date
Silver	Wojciech Wojdak	Swimming	Men's 800 m freestyle	July 26

== Diving ==
Poland has entered 3 divers (two male and one female).

Men

Athlete	Event	Preliminaries		Semifinals		Final	
Athlete	Event	Points	Rank	Points	Rank	Points	Rank
Andrzej Rzeszutek	1 m springboard	336.60	21	—N/a		Did not advance	
Andrzej Rzeszutek	3 m springboard	366.75	34	Did not advance			
Kacper Lesiak; Andrzej Rzeszutek	3 m synchronized springboard	351.93	15	—N/a		Did not advance	

Women

Athlete	Event	Preliminaries		Semifinals		Final	
Athlete	Event	Points	Rank	Points	Rank	Points	Rank
Kaja Skrzek	1 m springboard	240.30	21	—N/a		Did not advance	
Kaja Skrzek	3 m springboard	260.35	22	Did not advance			

== High diving ==
Poland qualified one male high diver.

Athlete	Event	Points	Rank
Kris Kolanus	Men's high diving	221.45	16

== Open water swimming ==
Poland has entered two open water swimmers

Athlete	Event	Time	Rank
Krzysztof Pielowski	Men's 5 km	54:52.0	12
Krzysztof Pielowski	Men's 10 km	1:52:24.5	11
Justyna Burska	Women's 5 km	1:02:02.5	32
Justyna Burska	Women's 10 km	2:07:13.6	31

== Swimming ==
Polish swimmers have achieved qualifying standards in the following events (up to a maximum of 2 swimmers in each event at the A-standard entry time, and 1 at the B-standard):

Men

Athlete	Event	Heat		Semifinal		Final	
Athlete	Event	Time	Rank	Time	Rank	Time	Rank
Konrad Czerniak	50 m butterfly	23.42	9 Q	23.37	9	Did not advance	
Konrad Czerniak	100 m butterfly	51.50	9 Q	51.60	14	Did not advance	
Paweł Juraszek	50 m freestyle	21.74	5 Q	21.74	7 Q	21.47 NR	5
Radosław Kawęcki	100 m backstroke	54.52	17	Did not advance			
Radosław Kawęcki	200 m backstroke	1:58.41	18	Did not advance			
Kacper Majchrzak	100 m freestyle	48.98	23	Did not advance			
Kacper Majchrzak	200 m freestyle	1:46.58	6 Q	1:46.40	9	Did not advance	
Tomasz Polewka	50 m backstroke	25.10	=12 Q	24.95	13	Did not advance	
Tomasz Polewka	100 m backstroke	54.30	12 Q	54.12	15	Did not advance	
Jakub Skierka	200 m backstroke	2:00.44	26	Did not advance			
Kacper Stokowski	50 m backstroke	25.63	31	Did not advance			
Marcin Stolarski	50 m breaststroke	27.73	25	Did not advance			
Marcin Stolarski	100 m breaststroke	1:00.79	27	Did not advance			
Jan Świtkowski	100 m freestyle	DNS		Did not advance			
Jan Świtkowski	200 m freestyle	1:47.42	18	Did not advance			
Jan Świtkowski	100 m butterfly	51.82	13 Q	52.02	16	Did not advance	
Jan Świtkowski	200 m butterfly	1:56.20	10 Q	1:55.84	=10	Did not advance	
Dawid Szwedzki	200 m individual medley	2:01.96	25	Did not advance			
Dawid Szwedzki	400 m individual medley	4:20.48	22	—N/a		Did not advance	
Wojciech Wojdak	400 m freestyle	3:46.73	10	—N/a		Did not advance	
Wojciech Wojdak	800 m freestyle	7:46.39	2 Q	—N/a		7:41.73 NR	2nd place, silver medalist(s)
Wojciech Wojdak	1500 m freestyle	14:57.39	5 Q	—N/a		15:01.27	7
Filip Wypych	50 m freestyle	21.74	32	Did not advance			
Filip Zaborowski	400 m freestyle	3:47.47	14	—N/a		Did not advance	
Antoni Kałużyński; Kacper Majchrzak; Jan Świtkowski; Filip Zaborowski	4×200 m freestyle relay	7:10.53	8 Q	—N/a		7:09.62	7
Konrad Czerniak; Kacper Majchrzak; Tomasz Polewka; Marcin Stolarski	4×100 m medley relay	3:34.00	10	—N/a		Did not advance	

Women

Athlete	Event	Heat		Semifinal		Final	
Athlete	Event	Time	Rank	Time	Rank	Time	Rank
Klaudia Naziębło	200 m backstroke	2:12.25	19	Did not advance			
Klaudia Naziębło	200 m butterfly	2:11.34	22	Did not advance			
Paulina Piechota	800 m freestyle	8:49.76	23	—N/a		Did not advance	
Dominika Sztandera	50 m breaststroke	31.31	18	Did not advance			
Dominika Sztandera	100 m breaststroke	1:09.91	28	Did not advance			
Alicja Tchórz	50 m backstroke	28.13	14 Q	28.13	=15	Did not advance	
Alicja Tchórz	100 m backstroke	1:01.26	22	Did not advance			
Aleksandra Urbańczyk	50 m freestyle	DSQ		Did not advance			
Aleksandra Urbańczyk	50 m backstroke	28.49	24	Did not advance			
Aleksandra Urbańczyk	50 m butterfly	26.00	13 Q	25.94	14	Did not advance	

== Synchronized swimming ==
Poland's synchronized swimming team consisted of 2 athletes (2 female).

Women

Athlete	Event	Preliminaries		Final	
Athlete	Event	Points	Rank	Points	Rank
Swietlana Szczepańska	Solo technical routine	69.9209	26	Did not advance	
Swietlana Szczepańska	Solo free routine	72.0333	28	Did not advance	
Julia Mikołajczak; Swietlana Szczepańska	Duet technical routine	69.6699	34	Did not advance	
Julia Mikołajczak; Swietlana Szczepańska	Duet free routine	72.2333	35	Did not advance	
