= Hungary at the 2017 World Aquatics Championships =

- Flag of Hungary
- World Aquatics code: HUN
- National federation: Magyar Úszó Szövetség
- Website: www.musz.hu

in Budapest, Hungary
- Competitors: 81 in 5 sports
- Medals Ranked 9th: Gold 2 Silver 5 Bronze 2 Total 9

World Aquatics Championships appearances (overview)
- 1973; 1975; 1978; 1982; 1986; 1991; 1994; 1998; 2001; 2003; 2005; 2007; 2009; 2011; 2013; 2015; 2017; 2019; 2022; 2023; 2024; 2025

Hungary competed as the host nation at the 2017 World Aquatics Championships in Budapest, Hungary from 14 July to 30 July.

== Medalists ==
Medal	Name	Sport	Event	Date
Gold	Katinka Hosszú	Swimming	Women's 200 m individual medley	July 24
Gold	Katinka Hosszú	Swimming	Women's 400 m individual medley	July 30
Silver	László Cseh	Swimming	Men's 200 m butterfly	July 26
Silver	Katinka Hosszú	Swimming	Women's 200 m backstroke	July 29
Silver	Kristóf Milák	Swimming	Men's 100 m butterfly	July 29
Silver	Hungary men's national water polo team: Viktor Nagy; Béla Török; Krisztián Manhercz; Gergő Zalánki; Márton Vámos; Norbert Hosnyánszky; Ádám Decker; Miklós Gór-Nagy; Balázs Erdélyi; Dénes Varga; Tamás Mezei; Balázs Hárai; Attila Decker	Water polo	Men's tournament	July 29
Silver	Dávid Verrasztó	Swimming	Men's 400 m individual medley	July 30
Bronze	Richárd Bohus; Péter Holoda; Dominik Kozma; Nándor Németh	Swimming	Men's 4 × 100 m freestyle relay	July 23
Bronze	Katinka Hosszú	Swimming	Women's 200 m butterfly	July 27

== Diving ==
Hungary has entered 5 divers (three male and two female).

Men

Athlete	Event	Preliminaries		Semifinals		Final	
Athlete	Event	Points	Rank	Points	Rank	Points	Rank
Botond Bóta	1 m springboard	265.45	44	—N/a		did not advance	
Botond Bóta	3 m springboard	282.20	51	did not advance			
Ábel Ligárt	1 m springboard	238.30	49	—N/a		did not advance	
Ábel Ligárt	3 m springboard	249.10	54	did not advance			
Krisztián Somhegyi	10 m platform	349.85	27	did not advance			

Women

Athlete	Event	Preliminaries		Semifinals		Final	
Athlete	Event	Points	Rank	Points	Rank	Points	Rank
Villő Kormos	10 m platform	265.15	28	did not advance			
Flóra Gondos; Villő Kormos	3 m synchronized springboard	237.54	17	—N/a		did not advance	

== Open water swimming ==
Hungary has entered eight open water swimmers

Men

Athlete	Event	Time	Rank
Gergely Gyurta	25 km	5:04:00.7	6
Márk Papp	5 km	55:28.1	31
Kristóf Rasovszky	5 km	54:47.6	7
Kristóf Rasovszky	10 km	1:52:01.7	5
Kristóf Rasovszky	25 km	did not finish	
Dániel Székelyi	10 km	1:52:35.7	21

Women

Athlete	Event	Time	Rank
Janka Juhász	5 km	1:01:52.5	27
Melinda Novoszáth	5 km	1:01:57.3	28
Anna Olasz	10 km	2:00:28.4	8
Anna Olasz	25 km	5:23:55.0	5
Onon Sömenek	10 km	2:04:41.2	27
Onon Sömenek	25 km	5:33:05.8	12

Mixed

Athlete	Event	Time	Rank
Janka Juhász; Anna Olasz; Márk Papp; Kristóf Rasovszky	Team	55:23.7	7

== Swimming ==
Hungarian swimmers have achieved qualifying standards in the following events (up to a maximum of 2 swimmers in each event at the A-standard entry time, and 1 at the B-standard):

Men

Athlete	Event	Heat		Semifinal		Final	
Athlete	Event	Time	Rank	Time	Rank	Time	Rank
Gábor Balog	50 m backstroke	25.56	27	did not advance			
Gábor Balog	100 m backstroke	54.88	21	did not advance			
Péter Bernek	200 m freestyle	1:47.79	25	did not advance			
Péter Bernek	200 m backstroke	1:56.53	2 Q	1:55.79 NR	6 Q	1:55.58 NR	6
Richárd Bohus	100 m freestyle	48.87	=18	did not advance			
Richárd Bohus	50 m backstroke	24.93	9 Q	24.88	10	did not advance	
László Cseh	50 m butterfly	23.41	8 Q	23.51	11	did not advance	
László Cseh	100 m butterfly	51.55	10 Q	51.16	4 Q	50.92	5
László Cseh	200 m butterfly	1:54.08	1 Q	1:54.22	2 Q	1:53.72	2nd place, silver medalist(s)
Gábor Financsek	50 m breaststroke	28.44	43	did not advance			
Dániel Gyurta	100 m breaststroke	1:00.76	26	did not advance			
Dániel Gyurta	200 m breaststroke	2:11.28	17	did not advance			
Gergely Gyurta	800 m freestyle	8:03.87	21	—N/a		did not advance	
Gergely Gyurta	400 m individual medley	4:19.90	18	—N/a		did not advance	
Ákos Kalmár	400 m freestyle	3:51.35	22	—N/a		did not advance	
Ákos Kalmár	1500 m freestyle	15:23.96	26	—N/a		did not advance	
Dominik Kozma	100 m freestyle	48.89	21	did not advance			
Dominik Kozma	200 m freestyle	1:46.83	8 Q	1:45.87	7 Q	1:45.54 NR	6
Tamás Kenderesi	200 m butterfly	1:55.96	7 Q	1:54.98	3 Q	1:54.73	4
Maxim Lobanovszkij	50 m freestyle	22.23	18	did not advance			
Kristóf Milák	100 m butterfly	51.23 WJ	5 Q	50.77 WJ, NR	3 Q	50.62 WJ, NR	2nd place, silver medalist(s)
Kristóf Rasovszky	1500 m freestyle	15:23.87	24	—N/a		did not advance	
Dániel Sós	200 m individual medley	2:01.54	22	did not advance			
Krisztián Takács	50 m freestyle	22.18	16 Q	22.05	15	did not advance	
Ádám Telegdy	200 m backstroke	1:57.41	8 Q	1:56.69	9	did not advance	
Dávid Verrasztó	400 m individual medley	4:11.89	3 Q	—N/a		4:08.38	2nd place, silver medalist(s)
Richárd Bohus; Péter Holoda; Dominik Kozma; Nándor Németh	4 × 100 m freestyle relay	3:13.28 NR	5 Q	—N/a		3:11.99 NR	3rd place, bronze medalist(s)
Benjámin Grátz; Dominik Kozma; Nándor Németh; Ádám Telegdy	4 × 200 m freestyle relay	7:11.10	10	—N/a		did not advance	
Richárd Bohus; Dániel Gyurta; Kristóf Milák; Dominik Kozma	4 × 100 m medley relay	3:33.35	6 Q	—N/a		3:32.13 NR	7

Women

Athlete	Event	Heat		Semifinal		Final	
Athlete	Event	Time	Rank	Time	Rank	Time	Rank
Katalin Burián	200 m backstroke	2:09.86	11 Q	2:08.65	10	did not advance	
Fanni Gyurinovics	100 m freestyle	55.86	28	did not advance			
Katinka Hosszú	200 m freestyle	1:56.43	3 Q	1:55.98	5 Q	1:56.35	7
Katinka Hosszú	100 m backstroke	58.80	2 Q	WD		did not advance	
Katinka Hosszú	200 m backstroke	2:07.30	2 Q	2:07.51	7 Q	2:05.85 NR	2nd place, silver medalist(s)
Katinka Hosszú	200 m butterfly	2:07.25	1 Q	2:07.37	6 Q	2:06.02	3rd place, bronze medalist(s)
Katinka Hosszú	200 m individual medley	2:07.49	1 Q	2:07.14	1 Q	2:07.00	1st place, gold medalist(s)
Katinka Hosszú	400 m individual medley	4:33.90	1 Q	—N/a		4:29.33 CR	1st place, gold medalist(s)
Zsuzsanna Jakabos	200 m individual medley	2:12.10	11 Q	2:11.92	12	did not advance	
Zsuzsanna Jakabos	400 m individual medley	4:41.40	12	—N/a		did not advance	
Sára Joó	50 m backstroke	28.91	33	did not advance			
Boglárka Kapás	400 m freestyle	4:05.93	5 Q	—N/a		4:04.77	5
Boglárka Kapás	800 m freestyle	8:28.93	6 Q	—N/a		8:24.41	5
Boglárka Kapás	1500 m freestyle	16:09.60	5 Q	—N/a		16:06.27	4
Ajna Késely	400 m freestyle	4:06.48	8 Q	—N/a		4:05.75	6
Ajna Késely	800 m freestyle	8:32.01	9	—N/a		did not advance	
Ajna Késely	1500 m freestyle	16:20.98	8 Q	—N/a		16:22.87	8
Flóra Molnár	50 m freestyle	25.61	28	did not advance			
Flóra Molnár	50 m butterfly	26.51	19	did not advance			
Dalma Sebestyén	200 m breaststroke	2:29.35	22	did not advance			
Liliána Szilágyi	100 m butterfly	58.00	10 Q	57.75	9	did not advance	
Liliána Szilágyi	200 m butterfly	2:07.73	5 Q	2:07.67	7 Q	2:07.58	7
Anna Sztankovics	50 m breaststroke	31.94	27	did not advance			
Anna Sztankovics	100 m breaststroke	1:08.66	25	did not advance			
Evelyn Verrasztó	200 m freestyle	1:59.92	20	did not advance			
Fanni Gyurinovics; Zsuzsanna Jakabos; Flóra Molnár; Evelyn Verrasztó	4 × 100 m freestyle relay	3:38.90	9	—N/a		did not advance	
Fanni Gyurinovics*; Katinka Hosszú; Zsuzsanna Jakabos; Ajna Késely; Evelyn Verrasztó	4 × 200 m freestyle relay	7:55.77	7 Q	—N/a		7:51.33	6
Katalin Burián; Anna Sztankovics; Liliána Szilágyi; Flóra Molnár	4 × 100 m medley relay	4:03.08 NR	10	—N/a		did not advance	

Mixed

Athlete	Event	Heat		Final	
Athlete	Event	Time	Rank	Time	Rank
Dominik Kozma; Richárd Bohus; Zsuzsanna Jakabos; Evelyn Verrasztó; Nándor Németh*	4 × 100 m freestyle relay	3:25.45	4 Q	3:25.02	6
Gábor Balog; Dániel Gyurta; Zsuzsanna Jakabos; Liliána Szilágyi	4 × 100 m medley relay	DSQ		did not advance	

== Synchronized swimming ==
Hungary's synchronized swimming team consisted of 12 athletes (12 female).

Women

Athlete	Event	Preliminaries		Final	
Athlete	Event	Points	Rank	Points	Rank
Szofi Kiss	Solo technical routine	78.7579	13	did not advance	
Szofi Kiss	Solo free routine	79.4000	17	did not advance	
Szofi Kiss; Dóra Schwarcz; Janka Dávid (R)	Duet technical routine	77.8583	19	did not advance	
Szofi Kiss; Dóra Schwarcz; Janka Dávid (R)	Duet free routine	79.8333	20	did not advance	
Janka Dávid; Szabina Hungler (R); Lili Kertai; Fanni Kézdi; Szofi Kiss; Sarolta Lukovszky; Lili Péntek (R); Luca Rényi; Alexandra Riemer; Dorá Schwarcz	Team technical routine	76.9077	15	did not advance	
Janka Dávid; Kamilla Kassai (R); Lili Kertai; Fanni Kézdi; Szofi Kiss; Sarolta Lukovszky (R); Luca Rényi; Alexandra Riemer; Dorá Schwarcz; Karolina Thuróczy	Team free routine	78.3333	16	did not advance	

Legend: (R) = Reserve Athlete

== Water polo ==
=== Men's tournament ===
Team roster

- Viktor Nagy
- Béla Török
- Krisztián Manhercz
- Gergő Zalánki
- Márton Vámos
- Norbert Hosnyánszky
- Ádám Decker
- Miklós Gór-Nagy
- Balázs Erdélyi
- Dénes Varga (C)
- Tamás Mezei
- Balázs Hárai
- Attila Decker

Group play

Pos	Team	Pld	W	D	L	GF	GA	GD	Pts	Qualification
1	Hungary (H)	3	2	1	0	35	19	+16	5 (Note: Hungary placed higher because of better goal difference against Australia.)	Quarterfinals
2	Italy	3	2	1	0	40	23	+17	5	Playoffs
3	Australia	3	1	0	2	19	36	−17	2	Playoffs
4	France	3	0	0	3	26	42	−16	0	

Source: Sportresult
Rules for classification: 1) points; 2) head-to-head points; 3) head-to-head goal difference; 4) head-to-head number of goals scored; 5) better result against higher placed team.
(H) Hosts
Notes:

17 July 2017; 20:10	Report	Australia	3–13	Hungary	Alfréd Hajós National Swimming Stadium, Budapest; Referees: Andrej Franulović (CRO), Steven Rotsart (USA)
17 July 2017; 20:10	Report	Score by quarters: 1–1, 1–4, 1–2, 0–6			Alfréd Hajós National Swimming Stadium, Budapest; Referees: Andrej Franulović (CRO), Steven Rotsart (USA)
17 July 2017; 20:10	Report	three players 1	Goals	Varga 4	Alfréd Hajós National Swimming Stadium, Budapest; Referees: Andrej Franulović (CRO), Steven Rotsart (USA)

19 July 2017; 20:10	Report	Hungary	9–9	Italy	Alfréd Hajós National Swimming Stadium, Budapest; Referees: Sergey Naumov (RUS), Matan Schwartz (ISR)
19 July 2017; 20:10	Report	Score by quarters: 4–4, 2–1, 1–3, 2–1			Alfréd Hajós National Swimming Stadium, Budapest; Referees: Sergey Naumov (RUS), Matan Schwartz (ISR)
19 July 2017; 20:10	Report	Varga, Vámos 3	Goals	Renzuto 3	Alfréd Hajós National Swimming Stadium, Budapest; Referees: Sergey Naumov (RUS), Matan Schwartz (ISR)

21 July 2017; 20:10	Report	France	7–13	Hungary	Alfréd Hajós National Swimming Stadium, Budapest; Referees: Radosław Koryzna (POL), Sergey Naumov (RUS)
21 July 2017; 20:10	Report	Score by quarters: 1–6, 3–2, 1–3, 2–2			Alfréd Hajós National Swimming Stadium, Budapest; Referees: Radosław Koryzna (POL), Sergey Naumov (RUS)
21 July 2017; 20:10	Report	Marzouki 4	Goals	Vámos 4	Alfréd Hajós National Swimming Stadium, Budapest; Referees: Radosław Koryzna (POL), Sergey Naumov (RUS)

Quarterfinals

25 July 2017; 20:30	Report	Hungary	14–5	Russia	Alfréd Hajós National Swimming Stadium, Budapest; Referees: Alessandro Severo (ITA), Francesc Buch (ESP)
25 July 2017; 20:30	Report	Score by quarters: 5–0, 3–1, 3–3, 3–1			Alfréd Hajós National Swimming Stadium, Budapest; Referees: Alessandro Severo (ITA), Francesc Buch (ESP)
25 July 2017; 20:30	Report	Hosnyánszky, Varga 4	Goals	Bugaychuk 2	Alfréd Hajós National Swimming Stadium, Budapest; Referees: Alessandro Severo (ITA), Francesc Buch (ESP)

Semifinals

27 July 2017; 20:30	Report	Greece	5–7	Hungary	Alfréd Hajós National Swimming Stadium, Budapest; Referees: Sergey Naumov (RUS), Francesc Buch (ESP)
27 July 2017; 20:30	Report	Score by quarters: 1–2, 3–3, 0–1, 1–1			Alfréd Hajós National Swimming Stadium, Budapest; Referees: Sergey Naumov (RUS), Francesc Buch (ESP)
27 July 2017; 20:30	Report	Genidounias 3	Goals	Hosnyánszky, Vámos 2	Alfréd Hajós National Swimming Stadium, Budapest; Referees: Sergey Naumov (RUS), Francesc Buch (ESP)

Final

29 July 2017; 20:30	Report	Hungary	6–8	Croatia	Alfréd Hajós National Swimming Stadium, Budapest; Referees: Adrian Alexandrescu (ROU), Alessandro Severo (ITA)
29 July 2017; 20:30	Report	Score by quarters: 0–4, 2–0, 2–2, 2–2			Alfréd Hajós National Swimming Stadium, Budapest; Referees: Adrian Alexandrescu (ROU), Alessandro Severo (ITA)
29 July 2017; 20:30	Report	Vámos 3	Goals	Sukno 3	Alfréd Hajós National Swimming Stadium, Budapest; Referees: Adrian Alexandrescu (ROU), Alessandro Severo (ITA)

=== Women's tournament ===
Team roster

- Edina Gangl
- Dóra Czigány
- Dóra Antal
- Gréta Gurisatti
- Gabriella Szűcs
- Orsolya Takács
- Anna Illés
- Rita Keszthelyi (C)
- Ildikó Tóth
- Barbara Bujka
- Dóra Csabai
- Dorottya Szilágyi
- Orsolya Kasó

Group play

Pos	Team	Pld	W	D	L	GF	GA	GD	Pts	Qualification
1	Hungary (H)	3	3	0	0	54	24	+30	6	Quarterfinals
2	Netherlands	3	2	0	1	45	20	+25	4	Playoffs
3	France	3	1	0	2	16	49	−33	2	Playoffs
4	Japan	3	0	0	3	27	49	−22	0	

Source: Sportresult
Rules for classification: 1) points; 2) head-to-head points; 3) head-to-head goal difference; 4) head-to-head number of goals scored; 5) Goal difference.
(H) Hosts

16 July 2017; 20:10	Report	Japan	11–20	Hungary	Alfréd Hajós National Swimming Stadium, Budapest; Referees: Steven Rotsart (USA), Alessandro Severo (ITA)
16 July 2017; 20:10	Report	Score by quarters: 1–4, 3–8, 2–5, 5–3			Alfréd Hajós National Swimming Stadium, Budapest; Referees: Steven Rotsart (USA), Alessandro Severo (ITA)
16 July 2017; 20:10	Report	Arima, Yamamoto 4	Goals	Bujka 5	Alfréd Hajós National Swimming Stadium, Budapest; Referees: Steven Rotsart (USA), Alessandro Severo (ITA)

18 July 2017; 20:10	Report	France	5–24	Hungary	Alfréd Hajós National Swimming Stadium, Budapest; Referees: Natacha Florestano (BRA), Ni Shiwei (CHN)
18 July 2017; 20:10	Report	Score by quarters: 0–7, 2–7, 3–6, 0–4			Alfréd Hajós National Swimming Stadium, Budapest; Referees: Natacha Florestano (BRA), Ni Shiwei (CHN)
18 July 2017; 20:10	Report	Millot 2	Goals	three players 4	Alfréd Hajós National Swimming Stadium, Budapest; Referees: Natacha Florestano (BRA), Ni Shiwei (CHN)

20 July 2017; 20:10	Report	Netherlands	8–10	Hungary	Alfréd Hajós National Swimming Stadium, Budapest; Referees: Alessandro Severo (ITA), Steven Rotsart (USA)
20 July 2017; 20:10	Report	Score by quarters: 2–2, 1–1, 2–4, 3–3			Alfréd Hajós National Swimming Stadium, Budapest; Referees: Alessandro Severo (ITA), Steven Rotsart (USA)
20 July 2017; 20:10	Report	Smit 4	Goals	three players 2	Alfréd Hajós National Swimming Stadium, Budapest; Referees: Alessandro Severo (ITA), Steven Rotsart (USA)

Quarterfinals

24 July 2017; 20:30	Report	Hungary	4–6	Canada	Alfréd Hajós National Swimming Stadium, Budapest; Referees: Alessandro Severo (ITA), Steven Rotsart (USA)
24 July 2017; 20:30	Report	Score by quarters: 0–1, 4–3, 0–1, 0–1			Alfréd Hajós National Swimming Stadium, Budapest; Referees: Alessandro Severo (ITA), Steven Rotsart (USA)
24 July 2017; 20:30	Report	four players 1	Goals	Eggens 5	Alfréd Hajós National Swimming Stadium, Budapest; Referees: Alessandro Severo (ITA), Steven Rotsart (USA)

5th–8th place semifinals

26 July 2017; 15:00	Report	Hungary	10–9	Greece	Alfréd Hajós National Swimming Stadium, Budapest; Referees: Andrej Franulović (CRO), Benjamin Mercier (FRA)
26 July 2017; 15:00	Report	Score by quarters: 2–4, 1–2, 5–0, 2–3			Alfréd Hajós National Swimming Stadium, Budapest; Referees: Andrej Franulović (CRO), Benjamin Mercier (FRA)
26 July 2017; 15:00	Report	Keszthelyi 3	Goals	Tsoukala 3	Alfréd Hajós National Swimming Stadium, Budapest; Referees: Andrej Franulović (CRO), Benjamin Mercier (FRA)

Fifth place game

28 July 2017; 13:30	Report	Italy	8–10	Hungary	Alfréd Hajós National Swimming Stadium, Budapest; Referees: Steven Rotsart (USA), Francesc Buch (ESP)
28 July 2017; 13:30	Report	Score by quarters: 2–3, 2–3, 2–2, 2–2			Alfréd Hajós National Swimming Stadium, Budapest; Referees: Steven Rotsart (USA), Francesc Buch (ESP)
28 July 2017; 13:30	Report	Bianconi, Garibotti 4	Goals	Keszthelyi 3	Alfréd Hajós National Swimming Stadium, Budapest; Referees: Steven Rotsart (USA), Francesc Buch (ESP)
