= Synchronized swimming at the 2017 World Aquatics Championships – Solo technical routine =

Solo technical routine at the 2017 World Aquatics Championships
- Venue: City Park
- Location: Budapest, Hungary
- Dates: 14 July (preliminaries); 15 July (final)
- Competitors: 30 from 30 nations
- Winning points: 95.2036

Medalists
gold medal	Svetlana Kolesnichenko	Russia
silver medal	Ona Carbonell	Spain
bronze medal	Anna Voloshyna	Ukraine

The Solo technical routine competition at the 2017 World Championships was held on 14 and 15 July 2017.

== Results ==
The preliminary round was started on 14 July at 11:00. The final was held on 15 July at 11:00.

Green denotes finalists

Rank	Swimmer	Nationality	Preliminary		Final	
Rank	Swimmer	Nationality	Points	Rank	Points	Rank
1st place, gold medalist(s)	Svetlana Kolesnichenko	Russia	94.0229	1	95.2036	1
2nd place, silver medalist(s)	Ona Carbonell	Spain	92.3893	2	93.6534	2
3rd place, bronze medalist(s)	Anna Voloshyna	Ukraine	90.5617	4	91.9992	3
4	Yukiko Inui	Japan	90.8837	3	91.7490	4
5	Jacqueline Simoneau	Canada	89.2331	5	89.5000	5
6	Linda Cerruti	Italy	87.8975	6	88.3369	6
7	Evangelia Platanioti	Greece	86.9661	7	86.5328	7
8	Vasiliki Alexandri	Austria	82.7804	8	83.9967	8
9	Min Hae-yon	North Korea	82.6416	9	83.1769	9
10	Joana Jiménez	Mexico	82.0066	10	82.4507	10
11	Lara Mechning	Liechtenstein	80.3468	11	81.8521	11
12	Vivienne Koch	Switzerland	80.2948	12	80.2700	12
13	Szofi Kiss	Hungary	78.7579	13	did not advance	
14	Giovana Stephan	Brazil	77.6135	14	did not advance	
15	Nada Daabousová	Slovakia	77.1854	15	did not advance	
16	Lee Ri-young	South Korea	76.9730	16	did not advance	
17	Michelle Zimmer	Germany	76.8697	17	did not advance	
18	Dara Tamer	Egypt	73.9650	18	did not advance	
19	Camila Arregui	Argentina	73.7771	19	did not advance	
20	Debbie Soh	Singapore	72.9689	20	did not advance	
21	Malin Gerdin	Sweden	72.5904	21	did not advance	
22	Isidora Letelier	Chile	72.4317	22	did not advance	
23	Kyra Hoevertsz	Aruba	72.0680	23	did not advance	
24	Gan Hua Wei	Malaysia	71.3383	24	did not advance	
25	Hristina Damyanova	Bulgaria	70.3736	25	did not advance	
26	Swietłana Szczepańska	Poland	69.9209	26	did not advance	
27	Nevena Dimitrijević	Serbia	69.8904	27	did not advance	
28	Natalia Jenkins	Costa Rica	67.2832	28	did not advance	
29	Carysney García	Cuba	65.4680	29	did not advance	
30	Aleisha Braven	New Zealand	64.8782	30	did not advance	
