= Open water swimming at the 2017 World Aquatics Championships – Women's 10 km =

Women's 10 km at the 2017 World Aquatics Championships
- Venue: Lake Balaton
- Location: Hungary
- Dates: 16 July
- Competitors: 62 from 40 nations
- Winning time: 2:00:13.7

Medalists
gold medal	Aurélie Muller	France
silver medal	Samantha Arévalo	Ecuador
bronze medal	Arianna Bridi	Italy
bronze medal	Ana Marcela Cunha	Brazil

The Women's 10 km competition at the 2017 World Championships was held on 16 July 2017.

== Results ==
The final was held at 10:00.

Rank	Swimmer	Nationality	Time
1st place, gold medalist(s)	Aurélie Muller	France	2:00:13.7
2nd place, silver medalist(s)	Samantha Arévalo	Ecuador	2:00:17.0
3rd place, bronze medalist(s)	Arianna Bridi	Italy	2:00:17.2
3rd place, bronze medalist(s)	Ana Marcela Cunha	Brazil	2:00:17.2
5	Rachele Bruni	Italy	2:00:21.4
6	Haley Anderson	United States	2:00:25.9
7	Finnia Wunram	Germany	2:00:26.1
8	Anna Olasz	Hungary	2:00:28.4
9	Chelsea Gubecka	Australia	2:00:30.0
10	Ashley Twichell	United States	2:00:41.3
11	Danielle Huskisson	Great Britain	2:01:06.1
12	Yan Siyu	China	2:01:06.1
12	Viviane Jungblut	Brazil	2:01:06.1
14	Angela Maurer	Germany	2:01:53.3
15	Anastasiya Krapyvina	Russia	2:01:55.2
16	Sharon van Rouwendaal	Netherlands	2:01:55.5
17	Xin Xin	China	2:01:59.8
18	Paula Ruiz	Spain	2:02:07.0
19	Kareena Lee	Australia	2:02:08.1
20	Yukimi Moriyama	Japan	2:02:13.3
21	Cecilia Biagioli	Argentina	2:02:23.6
22	Oceane Cassignol	France	2:03:01.0
23	Yumi Kida	Japan	2:03:06.6
24	Špela Perše	Slovenia	2:04:12.7
25	Alice Dearing	Great Britain	2:04:24.4
26	Kalliopi Araouzou	Greece	2:04:25.7
27	Onon Sömenek	Hungary	2:04:41.2
28	Stephanie Horner	Canada	2:04:48.1
29	Nataly Caldas	Ecuador	2:04:50.1
30	María de Valdes	Spain	2:04:54.4
31	Justyna Burska	Poland	2:07:13.6
32	Jade Dusablon	Canada	2:07:16.8
33	Daria Kulik	Russia	2:07:18.0
34	Julia Arino	Argentina	2:07:20.0
35	Angelica María	Portugal	2:07:20.4
36	Alena Benešová	Czech Republic	2:07:58.5
37	Lenka Štěrbová	Czech Republic	2:08:32.9
38	Martha Aguilar	Mexico	2:08:35.2
39	Souad Cherouati	Algeria	2:08:38.1
40	Charlotte Webby	New Zealand	2:08:41.4
41	Vânia Neves	Portugal	2:09:39.0
42	María Bramont-Arias	Peru	2:09:39.6
43	Robyn Kinghorn	South Africa	2:11:25.8
44	Xeniya Romanchuk	Kazakhstan	2:11:34.4
45	Doris Beroš	Croatia	2:11:54.4
46	Mahina Valdivia	Chile	2:11:55.1
47	Reem Kaseem	Egypt	2:11:57.4
48	Krystyna Panchishko	Ukraine	2:12:12.5
49	Ruthseli Aponte	Venezuela	2:14:39.5
50	Sasha-Lee Nordengen-Corris	South Africa	2:14:43.4
51	Jelena Ječanski	Serbia	2:16:10.6
52	Maryna Kyryk	Ukraine	2:17:02.2
53	Martha Sandoval	Mexico	2:17:48.2
54	Fatima Flores	El Salvador	2:18:47.9
55	Lok Hoi Man	Hong Kong	2:19:19.3
56	Karolína Balážiková	Slovakia	2:26:37.8
57	Nip Tsz Yin	Hong Kong	2:26:49.9
58	Nikitha Setru	India	2:28:14.6
59	Cindy Toscano	Guatemala	2:28:21.8
—	Merle Liivand	Estonia	OTL
—	Raquel Duran	Costa Rica	OTL
—	Dana Khaled	Egypt	DNF
