= Swimming at the 2017 World Aquatics Championships – Men's 400 metre freestyle =

Men's 400 metre freestyle at the 2017 World Aquatics Championships
- Venue: Danube Arena
- Location: Budapest, Hungary
- Dates: 23 July (heats and final)
- Competitors: 52 from 47 nations
- Winning time: 3:41.38

Medalists
gold medal	Sun Yang	China
silver medal	Mack Horton	Australia
bronze medal	Gabriele Detti	Italy

The Men's 400 metre freestyle competition at the 2017 World Championships was held on 23 July 2017.

== Records ==
Prior to the competition, the existing world and championship records were as follows.

World record	Paul Biedermann (GER)	3:40.07	Rome, Italy	26 July 2009
Competition record	Paul Biedermann (GER)	3:40.07	Rome, Italy	26 July 2009

== Results ==
=== Heats ===
The heats were held at 09:43.

Rank	Heat	Lane	Name	Nationality	Time	Notes
1	5	7	Felix Auböck	Austria	3:44.19	Q, NR
2	5	4	Sun Yang	China	3:44.55	Q
3	6	6	David McKeon	Australia	3:45.56	Q
4	6	3	Park Tae-hwan	South Korea	3:45.57	Q
5	6	4	Mack Horton	Australia	3:45.60	Q
6	5	5	James Guy	Great Britain	3:45.64	Q
7	6	5	Gabriele Detti	Italy	3:45.72	Q
8	5	3	Zane Grothe	United States	3:46.14	Q
9	5	8	Marwan El-Kamash	Egypt	3:46.36	NR
10	5	1	Wojciech Wojdak	Poland	3:46.73	
11	6	7	Henrik Christiansen	Norway	3:46.96	
12	5	6	Clark Smith	United States	3:47.12	
13	6	2	Alexander Krasnykh	Russia	3:47.35	
14	6	8	Filip Zaborowski	Poland	3:47.47	
15	5	2	Stephen Milne	Great Britain	3:48.64	
16	4	7	Jeremy Bagshaw	Canada	3:48.82	
17	4	6	Victor Johansson	Sweden	3:48.96	
18	4	3	Brandonn Almeida	Brazil	3:49.61	
19	4	1	Martin Bau	Slovenia	3:50.75	
20	6	0	Poul Zellmann	Germany	3:50.88	
21	4	4	Miguel Durán	Spain	3:51.28	
22	4	2	Ákos Kalmár	Hungary	3:51.35	
23	5	0	Anton Ipsen	Denmark	3:51.52	
24	5	9	Marcelo Acosta	El Salvador	3:51.76	
25	6	9	Qiu Ziao	China	3:51.94	
26	3	4	Richard Nagy	Slovakia	3:52.10	
27	4	0	Cristian Quintero	Venezuela	3:53.04	
28	4	5	Jan Micka	Czech Republic	3:53.06	
29	6	1	Maarten Brzoskowski	Netherlands	3:53.17	
30	3	2	Alin Artimon	Romania	3:53.45	
31	3	3	Ricardo Vargas	Mexico	3:53.63	
32	2	6	Khader Baqlah	Jordan	3:54.13	NR
33	4	9	Brent Szurdoki	South Africa	3:54.34	
34	2	4	Christian Bayo	Puerto Rico	3:55.15	
35	3	7	Martín Naidich	Argentina	3:55.42	
36	3	6	Mohamed Lagili	Tunisia	3:55.47	
37	2	5	Igor Mogne	Mozambique	3:55.97	NR
38	4	8	Dimitrios Dimitriou	Greece	3:56.58	
39	3	5	Marc Hinawi	Israel	3:57.43	
40	3	0	Aflah Fadlan	Indonesia	3:58.40	
41	2	2	Constantinos Hadjittooulis	Cyprus	3:58.58	
42	3	8	Wesley Roberts	Cook Islands	3:59.29	
43	3	1	An Ting-yao	Chinese Taipei	3:59.57	
44	2	3	Alex Sobers	Barbados	4:00.50	
45	1	3	Klavio Meça	Albania	4:04.03	NR
46	3	9	Irakli Revishvili	Georgia	4:04.64	
47	2	7	Jessie Lacuna	Philippines	4:05.39	
48	1	4	Mathieu Marquet	Mauritius	4:07.28	NR
49	2	8	Lin Sizhuang	Macau	4:08.73	NR
50	2	1	Felipe Tapia	Chile	4:10.39	
51	1	5	Abdalla Aboughazala	Qatar	4:20.64	
52	2	0	Mubal Ibrahim	Maldives	4:51.57	NR

=== Final ===
The final was held at 17:32.

Rank	Lane	Name	Nationality	Time	Notes
1st place, gold medalist(s)	5	Sun Yang	China	3:41.38	
2nd place, silver medalist(s)	2	Mack Horton	Australia	3:43.85	
3rd place, bronze medalist(s)	1	Gabriele Detti	Italy	3:43.93	
4	6	Park Tae-hwan	South Korea	3:44.38	
5	4	Felix Auböck	Austria	3:45.21	
6	7	James Guy	Great Britain	3:45.58	
7	8	Zane Grothe	United States	3:45.86	
8	3	David McKeon	Australia	3:46.27	
