= Swimming at the 2017 World Aquatics Championships – Women's 200 metre individual medley =

Women's 200 metre individual medley at the 2017 World Aquatics Championships
- Venue: Danube Arena
- Location: Budapest, Hungary
- Dates: 23 July (heats and semifinals); 24 July (final)
- Competitors: 36 from 29 nations
- Winning time: 2:07.00

Medalists
gold medal	Katinka Hosszú	Hungary
silver medal	Yui Ohashi	Japan
bronze medal	Madisyn Cox	United States

The Women's 200 metre individual medley competition at the 2017 World Championships was held on 23 and 24 July 2017.

== Records ==
Prior to the competition, the existing world and championship records were as follows.

World record	Katinka Hosszú (HUN)	2:06.12	Kazan, Russia	3 August 2015
Competition record	Katinka Hosszú (HUN)	2:06.12	Kazan, Russia	3 August 2015

== Results ==
=== Heats ===
The heats were held on 23 July at 10:18.

Rank	Heat	Lane	Name	Nationality	Time	Notes
1	4	4	Katinka Hosszú	Hungary	2:07.49	Q
2	4	5	Sydney Pickrem	Canada	2:10.14	Q
3	2	5	Madisyn Cox	United States	2:10.16	Q
4	3	4	Siobhan-Marie O'Connor	Great Britain	2:10.42	Q
5	2	6	Runa Imai	Japan	2:11.15	Q
6	4	7	Hannah Miley	Great Britain	2:11.32	Q
7	4	6	Kim Seo-yeong	South Korea	2:11.33	Q
8	4	3	Yui Ohashi	Japan	2:11.44	Q
9	2	4	Melanie Margalis	United States	2:11.47	Q
10	3	3	Erika Seltenreich-Hodgson	Canada	2:11.67	Q
11	2	2	Zsuzsanna Jakabos	Hungary	2:12.10	Q
12	3	6	Maria Ugolkova	Switzerland	2:12.24	Q
13	4	2	Yuliya Yefimova	Russia	2:12.41	Q
14	3	2	Ye Shiwen	China	2:12.48	Q
15	3	1	Joanna Maranhão	Brazil	2:12.60	Q
16	2	3	Kotuku Ngawati	Australia	2:13.03	Q
17	3	5	Viktoriya Andreeva	Russia	2:13.16	
18	4	1	Nguyễn Thị Ánh Viên	Vietnam	2:13.36	
19	4	0	Viktoriya Zeynep Güneş	Turkey	2:13.56	
20	3	7	Mireia Belmonte	Spain	2:13.82	
21	2	1	Helena Gasson	New Zealand	2:13.91	
22	2	7	Zhang Sishi	China	2:13.99	
23	3	8	Simona Baumrtová	Czech Republic	2:14.26	
24	2	8	Victoria Kaminskaya	Portugal	2:14.33	
25	2	0	Jenna Laukkanen	Finland	2:14.70	
26	4	9	Marjolein Delno	Netherlands	2:15.05	
27	3	0	Monika González	Mexico	2:16.11	
28	2	9	McKenna DeBever	Peru	2:16.52	NR
29	1	4	Ressa Kania Dewi	Indonesia	2:17.93	
30	3	9	Ilektra Lebl	Greece	2:19.05	
31	4	8	Virginia Bardach	Argentina	2:19.29	
32	1	5	Sara Nysted	Faroe Islands	2:26.48	
33	1	6	Claudia Verdino	Monaco	2:27.34	NR
34	1	3	Toto Wong	Hong Kong	2:27.68	
35	1	7	Sayani Ghosh	India	2:32.55	
36	1	2	Nooran Ba Matraf	Yemen	2:37.21	NR

=== Semifinals ===
The semifinals were held on 23 July at 18:32.

==== Semifinal 1 ====
Rank	Lane	Name	Nationality	Time	Notes
1	4	Sydney Pickrem	Canada	2:09.17	Q, NR
2	5	Siobhan-Marie O'Connor	Great Britain	2:09.72	Q
3	6	Yui Ohashi	Japan	2:10.45	Q
4	3	Hannah Miley	Great Britain	2:11.20	
5	2	Erika Seltenreich-Hodgson	Canada	2:11.61	
6	7	Maria Ugolkova	Switzerland	2:12.25	
7	1	Ye Shiwen	China	2:13.01	
8	8	Kotuku Ngawati	Australia	2:14.07	

==== Semifinal 2 ====
Rank	Lane	Name	Nationality	Time	Notes
1	4	Katinka Hosszú	Hungary	2:07.14	Q
2	2	Melanie Margalis	United States	2:08.70	Q
3	6	Kim Seo-yeong	South Korea	2:09.86	Q, NR
4	5	Madisyn Cox	United States	2:09.97	Q
5	3	Runa Imai	Japan	2:10.15	Q
6	8	Joanna Maranhão	Brazil	2:11.24	SA
7	7	Zsuzsanna Jakabos	Hungary	2:11.92	
8	1	Yuliya Yefimova	Russia	2:12.88	

=== Final ===
The final was held on 24 July at 18:54.

Rank	Lane	Name	Nationality	Time	Notes
1st place, gold medalist(s)	4	Katinka Hosszú	Hungary	2:07.00	
2nd place, silver medalist(s)	8	Yui Ohashi	Japan	2:07.91	NR
3rd place, bronze medalist(s)	7	Madisyn Cox	United States	2:09.71	
4	5	Melanie Margalis	United States	2:09.82	
5	1	Runa Imai	Japan	2:09.99	
6	2	Kim Seo-yeong	South Korea	2:10.40	
7	6	Siobhan-Marie O'Connor	Great Britain	2:10.41	
	3	Sydney Pickrem	Canada	DSQ	
