= Swimming at the 2017 World Aquatics Championships – Women's 200 metre backstroke =

Women's 200 metre backstroke at the 2017 World Aquatics Championships
- Venue: Danube Arena
- Location: Budapest, Hungary
- Dates: 28 July (heats and semifinals); 29 July (final)
- Competitors: 33 from 28 nations
- Winning time: 2:05.68

Medalists
gold medal	Emily Seebohm	Australia
silver medal	Katinka Hosszú	Hungary
bronze medal	Kathleen Baker	United States

The Women's 200 metre backstroke competition at the 2017 World Championships was held on 28 and 29 July 2017.

== Records ==
Prior to the competition, the existing world and championship records were as follows.

World record	Missy Franklin (USA)	2:04.06	London, Great Britain	3 August 2012
Competition record	Missy Franklin (USA)	2:04.76	Barcelona, Spain	3 August 2013

== Results ==
=== Heats ===
The heats were held on 28 July at 10:31.

Rank	Heat	Lane	Name	Nationality	Time	Notes
1	3	4	Kathleen Baker	United States	2:06.82	Q
2	4	4	Katinka Hosszú	Hungary	2:07.30	Q
3	2	4	Emily Seebohm	Australia	2:07.94	Q
4	3	6	Regan Smith	United States	2:08.13	Q
5	2	5	Kylie Masse	Canada	2:08.30	Q
6	3	5	Hilary Caldwell	Canada	2:08.32	Q
7	4	3	Daryna Zevina	Ukraine	2:09.16	Q
8	4	2	Kaylee McKeown	Australia	2:09.42	Q
9	4	7	Margherita Panziera	Italy	2:09.43	Q
10	3	7	África Zamorano	Spain	2:09.70	Q
11	4	6	Katalin Burián	Hungary	2:09.86	Q
12	4	5	Daria Ustinova	Russia	2:09.99	Q
13	2	3	Lisa Graf	Germany	2:10.10	Q
14	3	3	Liu Yaxin	China	2:10.59	Q
15	2	7	Tatiana Salcutan	Moldova	2:11.17	Q
16	3	2	Claudia Lau	Hong Kong	2:11.67	Q
17	4	1	Simona Baumrtová	Czech Republic	2:11.80	
18	2	6	Chen Jie	China	2:11.88	
19	2	1	Klaudia Naziębło	Poland	2:12.25	
20	3	1	Kim Seo-yeong	South Korea	2:13.26	
21	2	2	Rosie Rudin	Great Britain	2:13.27	
22	2	8	Ugnė Mažutaitytė	Lithuania	2:14.07	
23	4	0	Martina van Berkel	Switzerland	2:14.34	
24	3	8	Bobbi Gichard	New Zealand	2:15.97	
25	3	0	Karolina Hájková	Slovakia	2:16.42	
26	2	9	Fernanda González	Mexico	2:17.03	
27	3	9	Samantha Randle	South Africa	2:17.14	
28	4	9	Gabriela Georgieva	Bulgaria	2:18.69	
29	2	0	Signhild Joensen	Faroe Islands	2:19.11	
30	1	4	Celina Marquez	El Salvador	2:22.73	
31	1	5	Claudia Verdino	Monaco	2:29.27	
32	1	3	Osisang Chilton	Palau	2:46.60	
	4	8	Ekaterina Avramova	Turkey	DNS	

=== Semifinals ===
The semifinals were held on 28 July at 17:49.

==== Semifinal 1 ====
Rank	Lane	Name	Nationality	Time	Notes
1	7	Daria Ustinova	Russia	2:07.08	Q
2	5	Regan Smith	United States	2:07.19	Q, WJ
3	6	Kaylee McKeown	Australia	2:07.40	Q
4	4	Katinka Hosszú	Hungary	2:07.51	Q
5	3	Hilary Caldwell	Canada	2:07.64	Q
6	1	Liu Yaxin	China	2:09.02	
7	2	África Zamorano	Spain	2:09.73	
8	8	Claudia Lau	Hong Kong	2:14.82	

==== Semifinal 2 ====
Rank	Lane	Name	Nationality	Time	Notes
1	5	Emily Seebohm	Australia	2:05.81	Q, =OC
2	3	Kylie Masse	Canada	2:05.97	Q, NR
3	4	Kathleen Baker	United States	2:06.66	Q
4	6	Daryna Zevina	Ukraine	2:08.30	
5	7	Katalin Burián	Hungary	2:08.65	
6	1	Lisa Graf	Germany	2:09.00	
7	2	Margherita Panziera	Italy	2:10.95	
8	8	Tatiana Salcutan	Moldova	2:11.27	

=== Final ===
The final was held on 29 July at 17:47.

Rank	Lane	Name	Nationality	Time	Notes
1st place, gold medalist(s)	4	Emily Seebohm	Australia	2:05.68	OC
2nd place, silver medalist(s)	1	Katinka Hosszú	Hungary	2:05.85	NR
3rd place, bronze medalist(s)	3	Kathleen Baker	United States	2:06.48	
4	7	Kaylee McKeown	Australia	2:06.76	WJ
5	5	Kylie Masse	Canada	2:07.04	
6	8	Hilary Caldwell	Canada	2:07.15	
7	6	Daria Ustinova	Russia	2:07.35	
8	2	Regan Smith	United States	2:07.42	
