= South Africa at the 2017 World Aquatics Championships =

- Flag of South Africa
- FINA code: RSA
- National federation: Swimming South Africa
- Website: www.swimsa.co.za

in Budapest, Hungary
- Competitors: 60 in 5 sports
- Medals Ranked 14th: Gold 1 Silver 0 Bronze 1 Total 2

World Aquatics Championships appearances
- 1973; 1975; 1978; 1982; 1986; 1991; 1994; 1998; 2001; 2003; 2005; 2007; 2009; 2011; 2013; 2015; 2017; 2019; 2022; 2023; 2024

South Africa competed at the 2017 World Aquatics Championships in Budapest, Hungary from 14 to 30 July 2017.

== Medalists ==
Medal	Name	Sport	Event	Date
Gold	Chad le Clos	Swimming	Men's 200 m butterfly	July 26
Bronze	Cameron van der Burgh	Swimming	Men's 50 m breaststroke	July 26

== Diving ==
South Africa has entered 4 divers (four female).

Women

Athlete	Event	Preliminaries		Semifinals		Final	
Athlete	Event	Points	Rank	Points	Rank	Points	Rank
Nicole Gillis	1 m springboard	241.70	18	—		did not advance	
Julia Vincent	1 m springboard	221.80	28	—		did not advance	
Micaela Bouter	3 m springboard	231.40	30	did not advance			
Julia Vincent	3 m springboard	270.20	17 Q	289.65	12 Q	265.90	12
Jaimee Gundry	10 m platform	230.60	35	did not advance			
Micaela Bouter; Nicole Gillis	3 m synchronized springboard	249.66	14	—		did not advance	

== Open water swimming ==
South Africa has entered six open water swimmers

Athlete	Event	Time	Rank
Chad Ho	Men's 5 km	54:48.6	11
Chad Ho	Men's 10 km	1:52:29.9	13
Danie Marais	Men's 5 km	55:01.0	21
Nico Manoussakis	Men's 10 km	1:56:30.0	45
Robyn Kinghorn	Women's 5 km	1:03:41.5	41
Robyn Kinghorn	Women's 10 km	2:11:25.8	43
Sasha-Lee Nordengen-Corris	Women's 10 km	2:14:43.4	50
Michelle Weber	Women's 5 km	59:27.5	=7
Chad Ho; Nico Manoussakis; Danie Marais; Robyn Kinghorn	Mixed team	56:05.3	12

== Swimming ==
South African swimmers have achieved qualifying standards in the following events (up to a maximum of 2 swimmers in each event at the A-standard entry time, and 1 at the B-standard):

Men

Athlete	Event	Heat		Semifinal		Final	
Athlete	Event	Time	Rank	Time	Rank	Time	Rank
Martin Binedell	200 m backstroke	1:59.15	22	did not advance			
Myles Brown	200 m freestyle	1:47.09	13 Q	1:47.19	14	did not advance	
Douglas Erasmus	50 m freestyle	22.56	31	did not advance			
Douglas Erasmus	50 m butterfly	24.17	32	did not advance			
Chad le Clos	200 m freestyle	DNS		did not advance			
Chad le Clos	100 m butterfly	51.28	6 Q	51.48	12	did not advance	
Chad le Clos	200 m butterfly	1:55.90	5 Q	1:55.09	4 Q	1:53.33	1st place, gold medalist(s)
Ayrton Sweeney	200 m breaststroke	DNS		did not advance			
Ayrton Sweeney	200 m individual medley	2:04.18	32	did not advance			
Ayrton Sweeney	400 m individual medley	4:20.10	20	—		did not advance	
Brent Szurdoki	400 m freestyle	3:54.34	33	—		did not advance	
Brent Szurdoki	1500 m freestyle	15:18.84	23	—		did not advance	
Cameron van der Burgh	50 m breaststroke	26.54 AF	2 Q	26.74	3 Q	26.60	3rd place, bronze medalist(s)
Cameron van der Burgh	100 m breaststroke	DNS		did not advance			
Zane Waddell	50 m freestyle	22.86	45	did not advance			
Zane Waddell	100 m freestyle	49.99	46	did not advance			
Myles Brown; Douglas Erasmus; Clayton Jimmie; Zane Waddell	4 × 100 m freestyle relay	3:17.41	12	—		did not advance	
Martin Binedell; Myles Brown; Chad le Clos; Cameron van der Burgh	4 × 100 m medley relay	3:36.31	15	—		did not advance	

Women

Athlete	Event	Heat		Semifinal		Final	
Athlete	Event	Time	Rank	Time	Rank	Time	Rank
Kate Beavon	400 m freestyle	4:20.82	27	—		did not advance	
Kate Beavon	800 m freestyle	8:58.31	29	—		did not advance	
Emma Chellius	50 m freestyle	25.73	34	did not advance			
Kaylene Corbett	50 m breaststroke	31.91	25	did not advance			
Kaylene Corbett	100 m breaststroke	1:10.16	31	did not advance			
Kaylene Corbett	200 m breaststroke	2:31.36	23	did not advance			
Erin Gallagher	100 m freestyle	55.46	24	did not advance			
Erin Gallagher	50 m butterfly	27.36	34	did not advance			
Samantha Randle	1500 m freestyle	17:22.42	21	—		did not advance	
Samantha Randle	200 m backstroke	2:17.14	27	did not advance			
Kate Beavon; Kaylene Corbett; Erin Gallagher; Samantha Randle	4 × 100 m freestyle relay	3:57.83	13	—		did not advance	
Emma Chellius; Kaylene Corbett; Erin Gallagher; Samantha Randle	4 × 100 m medley relay	4:15.47	17	—		did not advance	

Mixed

Athlete	Event	Heat		Final	
Athlete	Event	Time	Rank	Time	Rank
Douglas Erasmus; Zane Waddell; Emma Chellius; Erin Gallagher	4 × 100 m freestyle relay	3:31.38 AF	12	did not advance	
Martin Binedell; Clayton Jimmie; Kaylene Corbett; Erin Gallagher	4 × 100 m medley relay	3:57.02 AF	14	did not advance	

== Synchronized swimming ==
South Africa's synchronized swimming team consisted of 10 athletes (10 female).

Women

Athlete	Event	Preliminaries		Final	
Athlete	Event	Points	Rank	Points	Rank
Emma Manners-Wood; Laura Strugnell; Lisa Wimmer (R)	Duet technical routine	67.3661	36	did not advance	
Emma Manners-Wood; Laura Strugnell; Faith Adonis (R)	Duet free routine	67.4667	39	did not advance	
Faith Adonis; Ceri Bezuidenhout; Phindy Makhaye; Sonal Reddi; Nina Smith; Giulia Torino; Tayla-Jade van Huyssteen; Lisa Wimmer	Team free routine	62.1333	25	did not advance	

Legend: (R) = Reserve Athlete

== Water polo ==
South Africa qualified both a men's and women's teams.

=== Men's tournament ===
Team roster

- Julian Lewis
- Etienne le Roux
- Devon Card
- Nardus Badenhorst
- Chris Brown
- Jon de Carvalho
- Lood Radie
- Nicholas Rodda
- Dean Whyte
- Pierre le Roux (C)
- Nicholas Molyneux
- Roarke Olver
- Themba Mthembu

Group play

Pos	Team	Pld	W	D	L	GF	GA	GD	Pts	Qualification
1	Serbia	3	3	0	0	43	16	+27	6	Quarterfinals
2	Greece	3	2	0	1	32	20	+12	4	Playoffs
3	Spain	3	1	0	2	28	23	+5	2	Playoffs
4	South Africa	3	0	0	3	11	55	−44	0	

Source: Sportresult
Rules for classification: 1) points; 2) head-to-head points; 3) head-to-head goal difference; 4) head-to-head number of goals scored; 5) better result against higher placed team.

17 July 2017; 17:30	Report	Serbia	21–5	South Africa	Alfréd Hajós National Swimming Stadium, Budapest; Referees: Michael Brooks (NZL), Nader Ghafouri (IRI)
17 July 2017; 17:30	Report	Score by quarters: 6–1, 7–1, 5–1, 3–2			Alfréd Hajós National Swimming Stadium, Budapest; Referees: Michael Brooks (NZL), Nader Ghafouri (IRI)
17 July 2017; 17:30	Report	three players 3	Goals	Le Roux 2	Alfréd Hajós National Swimming Stadium, Budapest; Referees: Michael Brooks (NZL), Nader Ghafouri (IRI)

19 July 2017; 10:50	Report	South Africa	2–18	Greece	Alfréd Hajós National Swimming Stadium, Budapest; Referees: Péter Molnár (HUN), Maged El Shamy (AUS)
19 July 2017; 10:50	Report	Score by quarters: 0–5, 2–3, 0–5, 0–5			Alfréd Hajós National Swimming Stadium, Budapest; Referees: Péter Molnár (HUN), Maged El Shamy (AUS)
19 July 2017; 10:50	Report	Le Roux, Molyneux 1	Goals	Fountoulis 6	Alfréd Hajós National Swimming Stadium, Budapest; Referees: Péter Molnár (HUN), Maged El Shamy (AUS)

21 July 2017; 09:30	Report	Spain	16–4	South Africa	Alfréd Hajós National Swimming Stadium, Budapest; Referees: Ni Shiwei (CHN), Michael Brooks (NZL)
21 July 2017; 09:30	Report	Score by quarters: 3–2, 1–0, 6–1, 6–1			Alfréd Hajós National Swimming Stadium, Budapest; Referees: Ni Shiwei (CHN), Michael Brooks (NZL)
21 July 2017; 09:30	Report	three players 3	Goals	four players 1	Alfréd Hajós National Swimming Stadium, Budapest; Referees: Ni Shiwei (CHN), Michael Brooks (NZL)

13th–16th place semifinals

23 July 2017; 12:00	Report	South Africa	4–13	United States	Alfréd Hajós National Swimming Stadium, Budapest; Referees: Radosław Koryzna (POL), Maged El-Shamy (EGY)
23 July 2017; 12:00	Report	Score by quarters: 0–1, 3–6, 1–3, 0–3			Alfréd Hajós National Swimming Stadium, Budapest; Referees: Radosław Koryzna (POL), Maged El-Shamy (EGY)
23 July 2017; 12:00	Report	four players 1	Goals	Irving, Obert 3	Alfréd Hajós National Swimming Stadium, Budapest; Referees: Radosław Koryzna (POL), Maged El-Shamy (EGY)

15th place game

25 July 2017; 09:30	Report	Canada	9–6	South Africa	Alfréd Hajós National Swimming Stadium, Budapest; Referees: Diego Garibaldi (ARG), Michael Brooks (NZL)
25 July 2017; 09:30	Report	Score by quarters: 1–2, 4–1, 2–1, 2–2			Alfréd Hajós National Swimming Stadium, Budapest; Referees: Diego Garibaldi (ARG), Michael Brooks (NZL)
25 July 2017; 09:30	Report	Constantin-Bicari 5	Goals	Le Roux 2	Alfréd Hajós National Swimming Stadium, Budapest; Referees: Diego Garibaldi (ARG), Michael Brooks (NZL)

=== Women's tournament ===
Team roster

- Rebecca Thomas
- Amber Penney
- Kieren Paley
- Shelley Faulmann
- Megan Schooling (C)
- Amica Hallendorff
- Carly Wessels
- Amy Keevy
- Zandre Smit
- Marcelle Manson
- Nicola Barrett
- Kelsey White (C)
- Lauren Nixon

Group play

Pos	Team	Pld	W	D	L	GF	GA	GD	Pts	Qualification
1	United States	3	3	0	0	58	17	+41	6	Quarterfinals
2	Spain	3	2	0	1	35	17	+18	4	Playoffs
3	New Zealand	3	1	0	2	17	38	−21	2	Playoffs
4	South Africa	3	0	0	3	11	49	−38	0	

Updated to match(es) played on 20 July 2017. Source: Sportresult
Rules for classification: 1) points; 2) head-to-head points; 3) head-to-head goal difference; 4) head-to-head number of goals scored; 5) Goal difference.

16 July 2017; 13:30	Report	South Africa	2–24	United States	Alfréd Hajós National Swimming Stadium, Budapest; Referees: Diego Caribaldi (ARG), Daniel Daners (URU)
16 July 2017; 13:30	Report	Score by quarters: 0–6, 0–7, 2–5, 0–6			Alfréd Hajós National Swimming Stadium, Budapest; Referees: Diego Caribaldi (ARG), Daniel Daners (URU)
16 July 2017; 13:30	Report	Barrett, Penney 1	Goals	Neushul 6	Alfréd Hajós National Swimming Stadium, Budapest; Referees: Diego Caribaldi (ARG), Daniel Daners (URU)

18 July 2017; 10:50	Report	New Zealand	8–6	South Africa	Alfréd Hajós National Swimming Stadium, Budapest; Referees: Diego Garibaldi (ARG), Benjamin Mercier (FRA)
18 July 2017; 10:50	Report	Score by quarters: 2–1, 1–2, 1–1, 4–2			Alfréd Hajós National Swimming Stadium, Budapest; Referees: Diego Garibaldi (ARG), Benjamin Mercier (FRA)
18 July 2017; 10:50	Report	Hudson, Mason 3	Goals	Schooling 2	Alfréd Hajós National Swimming Stadium, Budapest; Referees: Diego Garibaldi (ARG), Benjamin Mercier (FRA)

20 July 2017; 21:30	Report	South Africa	3–17	Spain	Alfréd Hajós National Swimming Stadium, Budapest; Referees: Diana Dutilh-Dumas (NED), Viktor Salnichenko (KAZ)
20 July 2017; 21:30	Report	Score by quarters: 1–4, 0–6, 1–2, 1–5			Alfréd Hajós National Swimming Stadium, Budapest; Referees: Diana Dutilh-Dumas (NED), Viktor Salnichenko (KAZ)
20 July 2017; 21:30	Report	three players 1	Goals	Forca 5	Alfréd Hajós National Swimming Stadium, Budapest; Referees: Diana Dutilh-Dumas (NED), Viktor Salnichenko (KAZ)

13th–16th place semifinals

22 July 2017; 10:30	Report	Brazil	10–5	South Africa	Alfréd Hajós National Swimming Stadium, Budapest; Referees: Ni Shiwei (CHN), Daniel Daners (URU)
22 July 2017; 10:30	Report	Score by quarters: 3–1, 2–1, 3–1, 2–2			Alfréd Hajós National Swimming Stadium, Budapest; Referees: Ni Shiwei (CHN), Daniel Daners (URU)
22 July 2017; 10:30	Report	Abla 5	Goals	Hallendorff 2	Alfréd Hajós National Swimming Stadium, Budapest; Referees: Ni Shiwei (CHN), Daniel Daners (URU)

15th place game

24 July 2017; 09:30	Report	South Africa	4–6	Kazakhstan	Alfréd Hajós National Swimming Stadium, Budapest; Referees: Ni Shiwei (CHN), Benjamin Mercier (FRA)
24 July 2017; 09:30	Report	Score by quarters: 1–2, 2–2, 1–0, 0–2			Alfréd Hajós National Swimming Stadium, Budapest; Referees: Ni Shiwei (CHN), Benjamin Mercier (FRA)
24 July 2017; 09:30	Report	Smit 2	Goals	Akilbayeva 2	Alfréd Hajós National Swimming Stadium, Budapest; Referees: Ni Shiwei (CHN), Benjamin Mercier (FRA)
