= Swimming at the 2017 World Aquatics Championships – Women's 400 metre individual medley =

Women's 400 metre individual medley at the 2017 World Aquatics Championships
- Venue: Danube Arena
- Location: Budapest, Hungary
- Dates: 30 July (heats and final)
- Competitors: 27 from 21 nations
- Winning time: 4:29.33

Medalists
gold medal	Katinka Hosszú	Hungary
silver medal	Mireia Belmonte	Spain
bronze medal	Sydney Pickrem	Canada

The Women's 400 metre individual medley competition at the 2017 World Championships was held on 30 July 2017.

== Records ==
Prior to the competition, the existing world and championship records were as follows.

World record	Katinka Hosszú (HUN)	4:26.36	Rio de Janeiro, Brazil	6 August 2016
Competition record	Katinka Hosszú (HUN)	4:30.31	Rome, Italy	26 July 2009

The following new records were set during this competition.

Date	Event	Name	Nationality	Time	Record
30 July	Final	Katinka Hosszú	Hungary	4:29.33	CR

== Results ==
=== Heats ===
The heats were held at 09:30.

Rank	Heat	Lane	Name	Nationality	Time	Notes
1	3	4	Katinka Hosszú	Hungary	4:33.90	Q
2	3	5	Mireia Belmonte	Spain	4:35.29	Q
3	3	3	Elizabeth Beisel	United States	4:36.18	Q
4	2	6	Sydney Pickrem	Canada	4:36.25	Q
5	3	6	Sakiko Shimizu	Japan	4:36.43	Q
6	2	3	Leah Smith	United States	4:36.94	Q
7	2	4	Yui Ohashi	Japan	4:36.97	Q
8	2	5	Hannah Miley	Great Britain	4:37.14	Q
9	3	2	Kim Seo-yeong	South Korea	4:39.80	
10	3	7	Nguyễn Thị Ánh Viên	Vietnam	4:40.39	
11	2	8	Joanna Maranhão	Brazil	4:41.29	
12	2	1	Zsuzsanna Jakabos	Hungary	4:41.40	
13	3	1	Zhou Min	China	4:42.26	
14	3	0	Viktoriya Zeynep Güneş	Turkey	4:42.27	
15	2	9	Ye Shiwen	China	4:43.40	
16	1	3	Kaylee McKeown	Australia	4:43.61	
17	2	0	Victoria Kaminskaya	Portugal	4:44.96	
18	3	8	Barbora Závadová	Czech Republic	4:46.75	
19	2	2	Mary-Sophie Harvey	Canada	4:46.88	
20	2	7	Abbie Wood	Great Britain	4:47.30	
21	1	6	Monika González	Mexico	4:48.00	
22	3	9	Anja Crevar	Serbia	4:48.53	
23	1	5	Helena Gasson	New Zealand	4:49.35	
24	1	4	Virginia Bardach	Argentina	4:53.22	
25	1	2	Ilektra Lebl	Greece	4:56.95	
26	1	7	Azzahra Permatahani	Indonesia	4:57.00	
27	1	1	Sara Nysted	Faroe Islands	5:21.21	
	1	8	Sayani Ghosh	India	DNS	

=== Final ===
The final was held at 18:20.

Rank	Lane	Name	Nationality	Time	Notes
1st place, gold medalist(s)	4	Katinka Hosszú	Hungary	4:29.33	CR
2nd place, silver medalist(s)	5	Mireia Belmonte	Spain	4:32.17	
3rd place, bronze medalist(s)	6	Sydney Pickrem	Canada	4:32.88	
4	1	Yui Ohashi	Japan	4:34.50	
5	2	Sakiko Shimizu	Japan	4:35.62	
6	7	Leah Smith	United States	4:36.09	
7	3	Elizabeth Beisel	United States	4:37.63	
8	8	Hannah Miley	Great Britain	4:38.34	
