= Swimming at the 2017 World Aquatics Championships – Men's 200 metre individual medley =

Men's 200 metre individual medley at the 2017 World Aquatics Championships
- Venue: Danube Arena
- Location: Budapest, Hungary
- Dates: 26 July (heats and semifinals); 27 July (final)
- Competitors: 44 from 40 nations
- Winning time: 1:55.56

Medalists
gold medal	Chase Kalisz	United States
silver medal	Kosuke Hagino	Japan
bronze medal	Wang Shun	China

The Men's 200 metre individual medley competition at the 2017 World Championships was held on 26 and 27 July 2017.

== Records ==
Prior to the competition, the existing world and championship records were as follows.

World record	Ryan Lochte (USA)	1:54.00	Shanghai, China	28 July 2011
Competition record	Ryan Lochte (USA)	1:54.00	Shanghai, China	28 July 2011

== Results ==
=== Heats ===
The heats were held on 26 July at 10:34.

Rank	Heat	Lane	Name	Nationality	Time	Notes
1	5	4	Kosuke Hagino	Japan	1:56.46	Q
2	5	5	Chase Kalisz	United States	1:56.48	Q
3	3	3	Max Litchfield	Great Britain	1:56.64	Q, NR
4	5	3	Daiya Seto	Japan	1:57.55	Q
5	3	5	Jérémy Desplanches	Switzerland	1:57.59	Q
6	5	2	Clyde Lewis	Australia	1:58.06	Q
7	4	4	Philip Heintz	Germany	1:58.99	Q
8	4	3	Qin Haiyang	China	1:59.01	Q, WJ
9	5	6	Andreas Vazaios	Greece	1:59.29	Q
10	2	4	Yakov Toumarkin	Israel	1:59.49	Q
11	3	4	Wang Shun	China	1:59.56	Q
12	4	5	Abrahm DeVine	United States	1:59.65	Q
13	4	6	Mark Szaranek	Great Britain	1:59.68	Q
14	3	6	Alexis Santos	Portugal	1:59.69	Q
15	3	2	Bradlee Ashby	New Zealand	2:00.20	Q
16	5	7	Federico Turrini	Italy	2:00.23	Q
17	4	9	Mohamed Hussein	Egypt	2:00.68	
18	4	7	Kirill Prigoda	Russia	2:00.81	
19	4	2	Thiago Simon	Brazil	2:01.01	
20	5	9	Tomas Peribonio	Ecuador	2:01.21	
21	3	1	Daniel Skaaning	Denmark	2:01.34	
22	4	1	Dániel Sós	Hungary	2:01.54	
23	5	1	Raphaël Stacchiotti	Luxembourg	2:01.60	
24	2	3	Richard Nagy	Slovakia	2:01.78	NR
25	2	5	Dawid Szwedzki	Poland	2:01.96	
26	3	7	Hugo González	Spain	2:02.78	
27	2	7	Christoph Meier	Liechtenstein	2:03.15	
28	2	6	Andrius Šidlauskas	Lithuania	2:03.25	
29	2	2	Stefan Šorak	Serbia	2:03.45	
30	3	0	Uvis Kalniņš	Latvia	2:03.66	
31	4	8	Pavel Janeček	Czech Republic	2:03.87	
32	5	8	Ayrton Sweeney	South Africa	2:04.18	
33	2	1	Thomas Tsiopanis	Cyprus	2:05.19	NR
34	5	0	Triady Fauzi Sidiq	Indonesia	2:05.34	
35	3	9	Wen Ren-hau	Chinese Taipei	2:05.85	
36	4	0	José Martínez	Mexico	2:06.00	
37	3	8	Carlos Omaña	Venezuela	2:06.29	
38	1	4	Brandon Schuster	Samoa	2:07.64	
39	2	0	Jessie Lacuna	Philippines	2:08.31	
40	2	8	Luis Vega Torres	Cuba	2:08.91	
41	2	9	Adriel Sanes	U.S. Virgin Islands	2:09.20	
42	1	5	Noel Keane	Palau	2:18.66	
43	1	3	Abdulrahman Al-Kulaibi	Oman	2:19.06	
44	1	6	Andrianirina Lalanomena	Madagascar	2:23.97	

=== Semifinals ===
The semifinals were held on 26 July at 18:45.

==== Semifinal 1 ====
Rank	Lane	Name	Nationality	Time	Notes
1	4	Chase Kalisz	United States	1:55.88	Q
2	5	Daiya Seto	Japan	1:56.92	Q
3	6	Qin Haiyang	China	1:57.81	Q, WJ
4	7	Abrahm DeVine	United States	1:58.01	
5	1	Alexis Santos	Portugal	1:59.22	
6	8	Federico Turrini	Italy	1:59.56	
7	3	Clyde Lewis	Australia	1:59.80	
8	2	Yakov Toumarkin	Israel	1:59.98	

==== Semifinal 2 ====
Rank	Lane	Name	Nationality	Time	Notes
1	4	Kosuke Hagino	Japan	1:56.04	Q
2	5	Max Litchfield	Great Britain	1:56.70	Q
3	3	Jérémy Desplanches	Switzerland	1:56.86	Q, NR
4	6	Philip Heintz	Germany	1:57.27	Q
5	7	Wang Shun	China	1:57.39	Q
6	2	Andreas Vazaios	Greece	1:57.98	NR
7	1	Mark Szaranek	Great Britain	1:58.80	
8	8	Bradlee Ashby	New Zealand	1:59.24	NR

=== Final ===
The final was held on 27 July at 17:32.

Rank	Lane	Name	Nationality	Time	Notes
1st place, gold medalist(s)	4	Chase Kalisz	United States	1:55.56	
2nd place, silver medalist(s)	5	Kosuke Hagino	Japan	1:56.01	
3rd place, bronze medalist(s)	1	Wang Shun	China	1:56.28	
4	3	Max Litchfield	Great Britain	1:56.86	
5	2	Daiya Seto	Japan	1:56.97	
6	8	Qin Haiyang	China	1:57.06	WJ
7	7	Philip Heintz	Germany	1:57.43	
8	6	Jérémy Desplanches	Switzerland	1:57.50	
