= Swimming at the 2017 World Aquatics Championships – Men's 100 metre backstroke =

Swimming event

Men's 100 metre backstroke at the 2017 World Aquatics Championships
- Venue: Danube Arena
- Location: Budapest, Hungary
- Dates: 24 July (heats and semifinals); 25 July (final)
- Competitors: 48 from 42 nations
- Winning time: 52.44

Medalists
gold medal	Xu Jiayu	China
silver medal	Matt Grevers	United States
bronze medal	Ryan Murphy	United States

The Men's 100 metre backstroke competition at the 2017 World Championships was held on 24 and 25 July 2017.

== Records ==
Prior to the competition, the existing world and championship records were as follows.

World record	Ryan Murphy (USA)	51.85	Rio de Janeiro, Brazil	13 August 2016
Competition record	Aaron Peirsol (USA)	52.19	Rome, Italy	2 August 2009

== Results ==
=== Heats ===
The heats were held on 24 July at 09:47.

Rank	Heat	Lane	Name	Nationality	Time	Notes
1	4	4	Xu Jiayu	China	52.77	Q
2	5	5	Matt Grevers	United States	52.92	Q
3	4	5	Grigory Tarasevich	Russia	53.18	Q
4	5	4	Ryan Murphy	United States	53.26	Q
5	5	3	Ryosuke Irie	Japan	53.54	Q
6	4	3	Apostolos Christou	Greece	53.55	Q
7	3	4	Mitch Larkin	Australia	53.72	Q
7	3	5	Guilherme Guido	Brazil	53.72	Q
9	3	2	Corey Main	New Zealand	53.97	Q
10	3	3	Li Guangyuan	China	54.04	Q
11	3	1	Matteo Milli	Italy	54.17	Q
12	4	2	Tomasz Polewka	Poland	54.30	Q
13	3	6	Shane Ryan	Ireland	54.33	Q
14	5	1	Yakov Toumarkin	Israel	54.39	Q
15	5	6	Javier Acevedo	Canada	54.43	Q
16	4	6	Kliment Kolesnikov	Russia	54.51	Q
17	4	7	Radosław Kawęcki	Poland	54.52	
18	4	8	Quah Zheng Wen	Singapore	54.68	
19	5	7	Mikita Tsmyh	Belarus	54.69	
20	5	2	Zac Incerti	Australia	54.82	
21	3	7	Gábor Balog	Hungary	54.88	
22	5	8	Marek Ulrich	Germany	54.90	
23	4	1	Hugo González	Spain	55.05	
24	3	8	Youssef Abdalla	Egypt	55.60	
25	2	6	Gytis Stankevičius	Lithuania	55.80	
25	4	9	Ralf Tribuntsov	Estonia	55.80	
27	2	5	Charles Hockin	Paraguay	55.81	NR
27	3	0	I Gede Siman Sudartawa	Indonesia	55.81	
29	3	9	Anton Loncar	Croatia	55.88	
30	4	0	Gabriel Lópes	Portugal	55.99	
31	5	0	Dmytro Gurnytskyi	Ukraine	56.05	
32	2	3	Girts Feldberg	Latvia	56.24	
33	2	4	Geoffroy Mathieu	France	56.38	
34	5	9	Lê Nguyễn Paul	Vietnam	56.64	
35	2	7	Christopher Courtis	Barbados	57.23	
36	2	8	Driss Lahrichi	Morocco	57.46	
37	1	4	Mehdi Benbara	Algeria	57.59	
38	1	1	Adel El-Fakir	Libya	58.48	
39	2	9	Madhu Prathapan	India	58.49	
40	1	6	Ronan Wantenaar	Namibia	58.91	
41	1	3	Eisner Barberena	Nicaragua	59.82	
42	2	1	Boris Kirillov	Azerbaijan	1:00.07	
43	1	2	Steven Maina	Kenya	1:00.55	
44	2	0	David van der Colff	Botswana	1:00.56	
45	1	7	Juwel Ahmmed	Bangladesh	1:03.55	
46	1	8	Boldbaataryn Buyantogtokh	Mongolia	1:04.52	
—	1	5	Yaaqoub Al-Saadi	United Arab Emirates	DNS	

=== Semifinals ===
The semifinals were held on 24 July at 17:48.

==== Semifinal 1 ====
Rank	Lane	Name	Nationality	Time	Notes
1	5	Ryan Murphy	United States	52.95	Q
2	4	Matt Grevers	United States	52.97	Q
3	6	Guilherme Guido	Brazil	53.71	Q
4	2	Li Guangyuan	China	53.84	
4	8	Kliment Kolesnikov	Russia	53.84	
6	1	Yakov Toumarkin	Israel	53.92	
7	3	Apostolos Christou	Greece	54.04	
8	7	Tomasz Polewka	Poland	54.12	

==== Semifinal 2 ====
Rank	Lane	Name	Nationality	Time	Notes
1	4	Xu Jiayu	China	52.44	Q
2	3	Ryosuke Irie	Japan	53.02	Q
3	5	Grigory Tarasevich	Russia	53.06	Q
4	6	Mitch Larkin	Australia	53.19	Q
5	2	Corey Main	New Zealand	53.76	Q
6	1	Shane Ryan	Ireland	53.94	
7	8	Javier Acevedo	Canada	54.11	
8	7	Matteo Milli	Italy	54.44	

=== Final ===
The final was held on 25 July at 18:36.

Rank	Lane	Name	Nationality	Time	Notes
1st place, gold medalist(s)	4	Xu Jiayu	China	52.44	
2nd place, silver medalist(s)	3	Matt Grevers	United States	52.48	
3rd place, bronze medalist(s)	5	Ryan Murphy	United States	52.59	
4	6	Ryosuke Irie	Japan	53.03	
5	2	Grigory Tarasevich	Russia	53.12	
6	7	Mitch Larkin	Australia	53.24	
7	1	Guilherme Guido	Brazil	53.66	
8	8	Corey Main	New Zealand	53.87	
