= Greece at the 2017 World Aquatics Championships =

- Flag of Greece
- World Aquatics code: GRE
- National federation: Hellenic Swimming Federation
- Website: www.koe.org.gr

in Budapest, Hungary
- Competitors: 54 in 4 sports
- Medals: Gold 0 Silver 0 Bronze 0 Total 0

World Aquatics Championships appearances
- 1973; 1975; 1978; 1982; 1986; 1991; 1994; 1998; 2001; 2003; 2005; 2007; 2009; 2011; 2013; 2015; 2017; 2019; 2022; 2023; 2024; 2025

Greece competed at the 2017 World Aquatics Championships in Budapest, Hungary from 14 July to 30 July.

== Open water swimming ==
Greece has entered three open water swimmers

Athlete	Event	Time	Rank
Georgios Arniakos	Men's 5 km	55:15.0	29
Georgios Arniakos	Men's 10 km	1:54:52.30	39
Asterios Daldogiannis	Men's 5 km	55:40.7	37
Asterios Daldogiannis	Men's 10 km	1:54:39.10	38
Kalliopi Araouzou	Women's 5 km	59:28.00	9
Kalliopi Araouzou	Women's 10 km	2:04:25.7	26

== Swimming ==
Greek swimmers have achieved qualifying standards in the following events (up to a maximum of 2 swimmers in each event at the A-standard entry time, and 1 at the B-standard):

Men

Athlete	Event	Heat		Semifinal		Final	
Athlete	Event	Time	Rank	Time	Rank	Time	Rank
Apostolos Christou	50 m backstroke	24.91	11 Q	24.88	=9	did not advance	
Apostolos Christou	100 m backstroke	53.55	6 Q	54.04	13	did not advance	
Apostolos Christou	200 m backstroke	DNS		did not advance			
Stefanos Dimitriadis	200 m butterfly	1:59.07	24	did not advance			
Dimitrios Dimitriou	200 m freestyle	1:50.40	47	did not advance			
Dimitrios Dimitriou	400 m freestyle	3:56.58	38	—N/a		did not advance	
Kristian Golomeev	50 m freestyle	21.69 NR	3 Q	21.71	=5 Q	21.73	7
Kristian Golomeev	100 m freestyle	48.88	20	did not advance			
Kristian Golomeev	50 m butterfly	23.85	20	did not advance			
Ioannis Karpouzlis	50 m breaststroke	28.07	=33	did not advance			
Ioannis Karpouzlis	100 m breaststroke	1:01.95	38	did not advance			
Odysseus Meladinis	50 m freestyle	22.50	28	did not advance			
Dimitrios Negris	800 m freestyle	8:05.88	24	—N/a		did not advance	
Dimitrios Negris	1500 m freestyle	15:35.55	33	—N/a		did not advance	
Andreas Vazaios	100 m butterfly	52.88	30	did not advance			
Andreas Vazaios	200 m individual medley	1:59.29	9 Q	1:57.98 NR	9	did not advance	
Apostolos Christou; Kristian Golomeev; Christos Katranzis; Odysseus Meladinis	4 × 100 m freestyle relay	3:16.92	11	—N/a		did not advance	
Dimitrios Dimitriou; Christos Katranzis; Dimitrios Negris; Andreas Vazaios	4 × 200 m freestyle relay	7:20.55	17	—N/a		did not advance	
Apostolos Christou; Kristian Golomeev; Ioannis Karpouzlis; Andreas Vazaios	4 × 100 m medley relay	3:35.93	14	—N/a		did not advance	

Women

Athlete	Event	Heat		Semifinal		Final	
Athlete	Event	Time	Rank	Time	Rank	Time	Rank
Theodora Drakou	50 m freestyle	25.22	19	did not advance			
Theodora Drakou	50 m backstroke	28.22	16 Q	28.13	=15	did not advance	
Theodora Drakou	100 m backstroke	1:00.88 NR	18	did not advance			
Ilektra Lebl	200 m individual medley	2:19.05	30	did not advance			
Ilektra Lebl	400 m individual medley	4:56.95	25	—N/a		did not advance	
Anna Ntountounaki	50 m butterfly	26.94	29	did not advance			
Anna Ntountounaki	100 m butterfly	59.01	22	did not advance			
Anna Ntountounaki	200 m butterfly	2:12.90	25	did not advance			

== Synchronized swimming ==
Greece's synchronized swimming team consisted of 13 athletes (1 male and 12 female).

Women

Athlete	Event	Preliminaries		Final	
Athlete	Event	Points	Rank	Points	Rank
Evangelia Platanioti	Solo technical routine	86.9661	7 Q	86.5328	7
Evangelia Platanioti	Solo free routine	87.8000	7 Q	88.0000	7
Evangelia Papazoglou; Evangelia Platanioti	Duet technical routine	85.8407	8 Q	85.7439	9
Evangelia Papazoglou; Evangelia Platanioti	Duet free routine	87.3000	8 Q	87.6333	8
Maria Armaou (R); Ifigeneia Dipla; Valentina Farantouri; Giana Gkeorgkieva; Vasiliki Kofidi (R); Sofia Malkogeorgou; Evangelia Papazoglou; Sofia Sarantidi; Anna Maria Taxopoulou; Athanasia Tsola	Team technical routine	83.8569	9 Q	83.9112	9
Maria Armaou (R); Ifigeneia Dipla; Valentina Farantouri; Giana Gkeorgkieva; Vasiliki Kofidi (R); Sofia Malkogeorgou; Evangelia Papazoglou; Sofia Sarantidi; Anna Maria Taxopoulou; Athanasia Tsola	Team free routine	85.3667	9 Q	86.4333	9
Maria Armaou; Ifigeneia Dipla; Valentina Farantouri; Giana Gkeorgkieva; Vasiliki Kofidi (R); Olga Kourgiantaki (R); Sofia Malkogeorgou; Evangelia Papazoglou; Evangelia Platanioti; Sofia Sarantidi; Anna Maria Taxopoulou; Athanasia Tsola	Free routine combination	86.0000	7 Q	87.0000	7

Mixed

Athlete	Event	Preliminaries		Final	
Athlete	Event	Points	Rank	Points	Rank
Olga Kourgiantaki; Vasileios Gkortsilas	Duet technical routine	68.1346	9 Q	69.8654	9
Vasiliki Kofidi; Vasileios Gkortsilas	Duet free routine	69.7333	10 Q	69.8333	10

Legend: (R) = Reserve Athlete

== Water polo ==
Greece qualified both a men's and women's teams.

=== Men's tournament ===
Team roster

- Konstantinos Flegkas
- Konstantinos Genidounias
- Evangelos Delakas
- Georgios Dervisis
- Ioannis Fountoulis (C)
- Marios Kapotsis
- Kyriakos Pontikeas
- Stylianos Argyropoulos
- Konstantinos Mourikis
- Christodoulos Kolomvos
- Alexandros Gounas
- Angelos Vlachopoulos
- Emmanouil Zerdevas

Group play

Pos	Team	Pld	W	D	L	GF	GA	GD	Pts	Qualification
1	Serbia	3	3	0	0	43	16	+27	6	Quarterfinals
2	Greece	3	2	0	1	32	20	+12	4	Playoffs
3	Spain	3	1	0	2	28	23	+5	2	Playoffs
4	South Africa	3	0	0	3	11	55	−44	0	

Source: Sportresult
Rules for classification: 1) points; 2) head-to-head points; 3) head-to-head goal difference; 4) head-to-head number of goals scored; 5) better result against higher placed team.

17 July 2017; 13:30	Report	Spain	7–8	Greece	Alfréd Hajós National Swimming Stadium, Budapest; Referees: Radoslaw Koryzna (POL), Péter Molnár (HUN)
17 July 2017; 13:30	Report	Score by quarters: 1–3, 2–2, 1–1, 3–2			Alfréd Hajós National Swimming Stadium, Budapest; Referees: Radoslaw Koryzna (POL), Péter Molnár (HUN)
17 July 2017; 13:30	Report	Mallarach 2	Goals	Fountoulis, Vlachopoulos 2	Alfréd Hajós National Swimming Stadium, Budapest; Referees: Radoslaw Koryzna (POL), Péter Molnár (HUN)

19 July 2017; 10:50	Report	South Africa	2–18	Greece	Alfréd Hajós National Swimming Stadium, Budapest; Referees: Péter Molnár (HUN), Maged El Shamy (AUS)
19 July 2017; 10:50	Report	Score by quarters: 0–5, 2–3, 0–5, 0–5			Alfréd Hajós National Swimming Stadium, Budapest; Referees: Péter Molnár (HUN), Maged El Shamy (AUS)
19 July 2017; 10:50	Report	Le Roux, Molyneux 1	Goals	Fountoulis 6	Alfréd Hajós National Swimming Stadium, Budapest; Referees: Péter Molnár (HUN), Maged El Shamy (AUS)

21 July 2017; 10:50	Report	Serbia	11–6	Greece	Alfréd Hajós National Swimming Stadium, Budapest; Referees: Péter Molnár (HUN), Frank Ohme (GER)
21 July 2017; 10:50	Report	Score by quarters: 2–1, 3–3, 3–0, 3–2			Alfréd Hajós National Swimming Stadium, Budapest; Referees: Péter Molnár (HUN), Frank Ohme (GER)
21 July 2017; 10:50	Report	Filipović 3	Goals	Delakas, Fountoulis 2	Alfréd Hajós National Swimming Stadium, Budapest; Referees: Péter Molnár (HUN), Frank Ohme (GER)

Playoffs

23 July 2017; 20:30	Report	Greece	14–4	Japan	Alfréd Hajós National Swimming Stadium, Budapest; Referees: Frank Ohme (GER), Steven Rotsart (USA)
23 July 2017; 20:30	Report	Score by quarters: 5–2, 5–0, 2–2, 2–0			Alfréd Hajós National Swimming Stadium, Budapest; Referees: Frank Ohme (GER), Steven Rotsart (USA)
23 July 2017; 20:30	Report	Fountoulis 4	Goals	Adachi 2	Alfréd Hajós National Swimming Stadium, Budapest; Referees: Frank Ohme (GER), Steven Rotsart (USA)

Quarterfinals

25 July 2017; 14:50	Report	Montenegro	7–12	Greece	Alfréd Hajós National Swimming Stadium, Budapest; Referees: Adrian Alexandrescu (ROU), Daniel Flahive (AUS)
25 July 2017; 14:50	Report	Score by quarters: 0–1, 2–5, 1–4, 4–2			Alfréd Hajós National Swimming Stadium, Budapest; Referees: Adrian Alexandrescu (ROU), Daniel Flahive (AUS)
25 July 2017; 14:50	Report	A. Radović 2	Goals	Fountoulis 4	Alfréd Hajós National Swimming Stadium, Budapest; Referees: Adrian Alexandrescu (ROU), Daniel Flahive (AUS)

Semifinals

27 July 2017; 20:30	Report	Greece	5–7	Hungary	Alfréd Hajós National Swimming Stadium, Budapest; Referees: Sergey Naumov (RUS), Francesc Buch (ESP)
27 July 2017; 20:30	Report	Score by quarters: 1–2, 3–3, 0–1, 1–1			Alfréd Hajós National Swimming Stadium, Budapest; Referees: Sergey Naumov (RUS), Francesc Buch (ESP)
27 July 2017; 20:30	Report	Genidounias 3	Goals	Hosnyánszky, Vámos 2	Alfréd Hajós National Swimming Stadium, Budapest; Referees: Sergey Naumov (RUS), Francesc Buch (ESP)

Third place game

29 July 2017; 15:00	Report	Greece	8–11	Serbia	Alfréd Hajós National Swimming Stadium, Budapest; Referees: Sergey Naumov (RUS), Benjamin Mercier (FRA)
29 July 2017; 15:00	Report	Score by quarters: 3–5, 1–2, 3–3, 1–1			Alfréd Hajós National Swimming Stadium, Budapest; Referees: Sergey Naumov (RUS), Benjamin Mercier (FRA)
29 July 2017; 15:00	Report	Fountoulis 3	Goals	D. Pijetlović, Ranđelović 2	Alfréd Hajós National Swimming Stadium, Budapest; Referees: Sergey Naumov (RUS), Benjamin Mercier (FRA)

=== Women's tournament ===
Team roster

- Eleni Kouvdou
- Christina Tsoukala
- Vasiliki Diamantopoulou
- Nikoleta Eleftheriadou
- Margarita Plevritou
- Alkisti Avramidou
- Alexandra Asimaki (C)
- Ioanna Chydirioti
- Christina Kotsia
- Triantafyllia Manolioudaki
- Eleftheria Plevritou
- Eleni Xenaki
- Chrysoula Diamantopoulou

Group play

Pos	Team	Pld	W	D	L	GF	GA	GD	Pts	Qualification
1	Greece	3	2	0	1	37	22	+15	4 (Note: Greece 2 Pts, +1 GD; Australia 2 Pts, 0 GD; Russia 2 Pts, −1 GD)	Quarterfinals
2	Australia	3	2	0	1	32	20	+12	4	Playoffs
3	Russia	3	2	0	1	29	21	+8	4	Playoffs
4	Kazakhstan	3	0	0	3	15	50	−35	0	

Source: Sportresult
Rules for classification: 1) points; 2) head-to-head points; 3) head-to-head goal difference; 4) head-to-head number of goals scored; 5) Goal difference.
Notes:

16 July 2017; 21:30	Report	Russia	9–7	Greece	Alfréd Hajós National Swimming Stadium, Budapest; Referees: Francesc Buch (ESP), Adrian Alexandrescu (ROU)
16 July 2017; 21:30	Report	Score by quarters: 2–1, 4–3, 2–3, 1–0			Alfréd Hajós National Swimming Stadium, Budapest; Referees: Francesc Buch (ESP), Adrian Alexandrescu (ROU)
16 July 2017; 21:30	Report	Karimova, Simanovich 3	Goals	three players 2	Alfréd Hajós National Swimming Stadium, Budapest; Referees: Francesc Buch (ESP), Adrian Alexandrescu (ROU)

18 July 2017; 13:30	Report	Greece	19–5	Kazakhstan	Alfréd Hajós National Swimming Stadium, Budapest; Referees: Daniel Daners (URU), Stanko Ivanovski (MNE)
18 July 2017; 13:30	Report	Score by quarters: 5–0, 4–2, 4–1, 6–2			Alfréd Hajós National Swimming Stadium, Budapest; Referees: Daniel Daners (URU), Stanko Ivanovski (MNE)
18 July 2017; 13:30	Report	Asimaki 4	Goals	Akilbayeva 3	Alfréd Hajós National Swimming Stadium, Budapest; Referees: Daniel Daners (URU), Stanko Ivanovski (MNE)

20 July 2017; 10:50	Report	Australia	8–11	Greece	Alfréd Hajós National Swimming Stadium, Budapest; Referees: Adrian Alexandrescu (ROU), Vojin Putniković (SRB)
20 July 2017; 10:50	Report	Score by quarters: 2–2, 3–3, 2–3, 1–3			Alfréd Hajós National Swimming Stadium, Budapest; Referees: Adrian Alexandrescu (ROU), Vojin Putniković (SRB)
20 July 2017; 10:50	Report	Gofers 3	Goals	Asimaki, El. Plevritou 3	Alfréd Hajós National Swimming Stadium, Budapest; Referees: Adrian Alexandrescu (ROU), Vojin Putniković (SRB)

Quarterfinals

24 July 2017; 22:00	Report	Greece	10–10 ^{(2–4 PSO)} (PSO)	Spain	Alfréd Hajós National Swimming Stadium, Budapest; Referees: Sergey Naumov (RUS), Vojin Putniković (SRB)
24 July 2017; 22:00	Report	Score by quarters: 3–2, 2–2, 2–2, 3–4 PSO: 2–4			Alfréd Hajós National Swimming Stadium, Budapest; Referees: Sergey Naumov (RUS), Vojin Putniković (SRB)
24 July 2017; 22:00	Report	Kotsia 3	Goals	B. Ortiz 4	Alfréd Hajós National Swimming Stadium, Budapest; Referees: Sergey Naumov (RUS), Vojin Putniković (SRB)

5th–8th place semifinals

26 July 2017; 15:00	Report	Hungary	10–9	Greece	Alfréd Hajós National Swimming Stadium, Budapest; Referees: Andrej Franulović (CRO), Benjamin Mercier (FRA)
26 July 2017; 15:00	Report	Score by quarters: 2–4, 1–2, 5–0, 2–3			Alfréd Hajós National Swimming Stadium, Budapest; Referees: Andrej Franulović (CRO), Benjamin Mercier (FRA)
26 July 2017; 15:00	Report	Keszthelyi 3	Goals	Tsoukala 3	Alfréd Hajós National Swimming Stadium, Budapest; Referees: Andrej Franulović (CRO), Benjamin Mercier (FRA)

Seventh place game

28 July 2017; 12:00	Report	Australia	6–8	Greece	Alfréd Hajós National Swimming Stadium, Budapest; Referees: Natacha Florestano (BRA), Andrej Franulović (CRO)
28 July 2017; 12:00	Report	Score by quarters: 0–1, 1–4, 3–3, 2–0			Alfréd Hajós National Swimming Stadium, Budapest; Referees: Natacha Florestano (BRA), Andrej Franulović (CRO)
28 July 2017; 12:00	Report	six players 1	Goals	Tsoukala 3	Alfréd Hajós National Swimming Stadium, Budapest; Referees: Natacha Florestano (BRA), Andrej Franulović (CRO)
