= Swimming at the 2017 World Aquatics Championships – Men's 200 metre backstroke =

Men's 200 metre backstroke at the 2017 World Aquatics Championships
- Venue: Danube Arena
- Location: Budapest, Hungary
- Dates: 27 July (heats and semifinals); 28 July (final)
- Competitors: 40 from 33 nations
- Winning time: 1:53.61

Medalists
gold medal	Evgeny Rylov	Russia
silver medal	Ryan Murphy	United States
bronze medal	Jacob Pebley	United States

The Men's 200 metre backstroke competition at the 2017 World Championships was held on 27 and 28 July 2017.

== Records ==
Prior to the competition, the existing world and championship records were as follows.

World record	Aaron Peirsol (USA)	1:51.92	Rome, Italy	31 July 2009
Competition record	Aaron Peirsol (USA)	1:51.92	Rome, Italy	31 July 2009

== Results ==
=== Heats ===
The heats were held on 27 July at 09:51.

Rank	Heat	Lane	Name	Nationality	Time	Notes
1	5	4	Ryan Murphy	United States	1:56.11	Q
2	5	2	Péter Bernek	Hungary	1:56.53	Q
3	3	7	Danas Rapšys	Lithuania	1:56.67	Q, NR
4	3	5	Kliment Kolesnikov	Russia	1:56.74	Q
5	5	5	Xu Jiayu	China	1:56.92	Q
6	3	3	Ryosuke Irie	Japan	1:57.21	Q
7	4	4	Evgeny Rylov	Russia	1:57.28	Q
8	5	1	Ádám Telegdy	Hungary	1:57.41	Q
9	5	3	Li Guangyuan	China	1:57.66	Q
10	5	6	Josh Beaver	Australia	1:57.67	Q
10	4	8	Luke Greenbank	Great Britain	1:57.67	Q
12	4	6	Kosuke Hagino	Japan	1:57.97	Q
13	3	4	Mitch Larkin	Australia	1:58.00	Q
14	4	5	Jacob Pebley	United States	1:58.05	Q
15	5	7	Leonardo de Deus	Brazil	1:58.33	Q
16	5	8	Corey Main	New Zealand	1:58.34	Q
17	3	6	Matteo Restivo	Italy	1:58.37	
18	4	3	Radosław Kawęcki	Poland	1:58.41	
19	3	8	Mikita Tsmyh	Belarus	1:58.72	
20	4	7	Geoffroy Mathieu	France	1:58.92	
21	5	0	Conor Ferguson	Ireland	1:59.03	
22	3	0	Martin Binedell	South Africa	1:59.15	
23	4	2	Yakov Toumarkin	Israel	1:59.25	
24	2	5	Quah Zheng Wen	Singapore	1:59.49	NR
25	2	3	Vuk Čelić	Serbia	2:00.27	
26	4	1	Jakub Skierka	Poland	2:00.44	
27	4	9	Anton Loncar	Croatia	2:00.46	
28	5	9	Omar Pinzón	Colombia	2:00.68	
29	2	1	Nils Liess	Switzerland	2:00.96	
30	4	0	Roman Dmytrijev	Czech Republic	2:01.38	
31	3	9	Matías López	Paraguay	2:01.84	
32	3	2	Hugo González	Spain	2:02.41	
33	1	4	Gabriel Lópes	Portugal	2:02.78	
34	2	8	Adil Kaskabay	Kazakhstan	2:03.09	
35	2	2	Carlos Omaña	Venezuela	2:03.13	
36	2	4	Daniil Bukin	Uzbekistan	2:03.49	
37	2	6	Yeziel Morales	Puerto Rico	2:05.11	
38	2	7	Boris Kirillov	Azerbaijan	2:09.22	
39	1	5	Eisner Barberena	Nicaragua	2:11.92	
40	1	3	Andrianirina Lalanomena	Madagascar	2:21.04	
	3	1	Apostolos Christou	Greece	DNS	

=== Semifinals ===
The semifinals were held on 27 July at 19:03.

==== Semifinal 1 ====
Rank	Lane	Name	Nationality	Time	Notes
1	5	Kliment Kolesnikov	Russia	1:55.15	Q, WJ
2	1	Jacob Pebley	United States	1:55.20	Q
3	3	Ryosuke Irie	Japan	1:55.79	Q
3	4	Péter Bernek	Hungary	1:55.79	Q, NR
5	6	Ádám Telegdy	Hungary	1:56.69	
6	2	Luke Greenbank	Great Britain	1:58.50	
7	7	Kosuke Hagino	Japan	1:58.72	
8	8	Corey Main	New Zealand	2:01.00	

==== Semifinal 2 ====
Rank	Lane	Name	Nationality	Time	Notes
1	3	Xu Jiayu	China	1:54.79	Q
2	4	Ryan Murphy	United States	1:54.93	Q
3	6	Evgeny Rylov	Russia	1:54.96	Q
4	5	Danas Rapšys	Lithuania	1:56.11	Q, NR
5	2	Li Guangyuan	China	1:57.10	
6	8	Leonardo de Deus	Brazil	1:57.89	
7	7	Josh Beaver	Australia	1:58.10	
8	1	Mitch Larkin	Australia	1:59.10	

=== Final ===
The final was held on 28 July at 17:40.

Rank	Lane	Name	Nationality	Time	Notes
1st place, gold medalist(s)	3	Evgeny Rylov	Russia	1:53.61	ER
2nd place, silver medalist(s)	5	Ryan Murphy	United States	1:54.21	
3rd place, bronze medalist(s)	2	Jacob Pebley	United States	1:55.06	
4	6	Kliment Kolesnikov	Russia	1:55.14	WJ
5	4	Xu Jiayu	China	1:55.26	
6	1	Péter Bernek	Hungary	1:55.58	NR
7	7	Ryosuke Irie	Japan	1:56.35	
8	8	Danas Rapšys	Lithuania	1:56.96	
