= Swimming at the 2017 World Aquatics Championships – Women's 100 metre breaststroke =

Women's 100 metre breaststroke at the 2017 World Aquatics Championships
- Venue: Danube Arena
- Location: Budapest, Hungary
- Dates: 24 July (heats and semifinals); 25 July (final)
- Competitors: 54 from 45 nations
- Winning time: 1:04.13 WR

Medalists
gold medal	Lilly King	United States
silver medal	Katie Meili	United States
bronze medal	Yuliya Yefimova	Russia

The Women's 100 metre breaststroke competition at the 2017 World Championships was held on 24 and 25 July 2017.

== Records ==
Prior to the competition, the existing world and championship records were as follows.

World record	Rūta Meilutytė (LTU)	1:04.35	Barcelona, Spain	29 July 2013
Competition record	Rūta Meilutytė (LTU)	1:04.35	Barcelona, Spain	29 July 2013

The following new records were set during this competition.

Date	Event	Name	Nationality	Time	Record
25 July	Final	Lilly King	United States	1:04.13	WR, CR

== Results ==
=== Heats ===
The heats were held on 24 July at 10:00.

Rank	Heat	Lane	Name	Nationality	Time	Notes
1	5	4	Lilly King	United States	1:05.20	Q
2	6	4	Yuliya Yefimova	Russia	1:05.60	Q
3	6	5	Rūta Meilutytė	Lithuania	1:05.81	Q
4	4	4	Katie Meili	United States	1:06.39	Q
5	5	2	Taylor McKeown	Australia	1:06.64	Q
6	4	3	Jessica Vall	Spain	1:06.85	Q
7	5	5	Shi Jinglin	China	1:06.94	Q
8	6	2	Rachel Nicol	Canada	1:07.10	Q
9	6	1	Jessica Hansen	Australia	1:07.12	Q
10	4	6	Satomi Suzuki	Japan	1:07.20	Q
10	6	7	Sarah Vasey	Great Britain	1:07.20	Q
12	6	3	Siobhan-Marie O'Connor	Great Britain	1:07.33	Q, WD
13	4	5	Jennie Johansson	Sweden	1:07.35	Q
14	5	6	Rikke Møller Pedersen	Denmark	1:07.39	Q
15	4	1	Arianna Castiglioni	Italy	1:07.43	Q
15	4	7	Kierra Smith	Canada	1:07.43	Q
17	4	2	Reona Aoki	Japan	1:07.48	Q
18	6	6	Hrafnhildur Lúthersdóttir	Iceland	1:07.54	
19	6	9	Martina Moravčíková	Czech Republic	1:07.69	
20	6	8	Jenna Laukkanen	Finland	1:07.83	
21	5	7	Natalia Ivaneeva	Russia	1:07.97	
22	5	3	Martina Carraro	Italy	1:08.11	
23	5	0	Macarena Ceballos	Argentina	1:08.34	
24	4	8	Mona McSharry	Ireland	1:08.52	
25	4	0	Anna Sztankovics	Hungary	1:08.66	
26	3	4	Maria Romanjuk	Estonia	1:08.81	NR
26	5	8	Zhang Xinyu	China	1:08.81	
28	6	0	Dominika Sztandera	Poland	1:09.91	
29	3	5	Natasha Lloyd	New Zealand	1:10.11	
30	5	9	Andrea Podmaníková	Slovakia	1:10.13	
31	4	9	Kaylene Corbett	South Africa	1:10.16	
32	5	1	Viktoriya Zeynep Güneş	Turkey	1:10.30	
33	3	3	Mariya Liver	Ukraine	1:10.49	
34	3	2	Alina Bulmag	Moldova	1:10.89	
35	3	6	Rebecca Kamau	Kenya	1:11.61	
36	2	5	Tilka Paljk	Zambia	1:12.65	NR
37	3	0	Amy Micallef	Malta	1:12.79	NR
38	2	3	Lei On Kei	Macau	1:14.11	
39	3	7	Dariya Talanova	Kyrgyzstan	1:14.13	
40	3	9	Vanessa Rivas	Dominican Republic	1:14.14	
41	1	5	Nguyễn Thị Nhất Lam	Vietnam	1:15.99	
42	3	8	Meri Mumladze	Georgia	1:16.70	NR
43	2	4	Nawapas Pisanuwong	Thailand	1:16.91	
44	1	6	Honia Ibrahim	Iraq	1:17.48	NR
44	3	1	Evita Leter	Suriname	1:17.48	
46	1	4	Batbayaryn Enkhkhuslen	Mongolia	1:18.70	NR
47	1	3	Jang Myong-gyong	North Korea	1:18.87	
48	2	6	Oreoluwa Cherebin	Grenada	1:18.91	
49	2	2	Melisa Zhdrella	Kosovo	1:21.47	NR
50	1	2	Elen Yesayan	Armenia	1:21.84	NR
51	2	0	Tilali Scanlan	American Samoa	1:23.03	NR
52	2	9	Tisa Shakya	Nepal	1:26.13	NR
53	2	8	Sajina Aishath	Maldives	1:28.92	
—	2	1	Maayaa Ayawere	Ghana	DNS	

=== Semifinals ===
The semifinals were started on 24 July at 17:58.

==== Semifinal 1 ====
Rank	Lane	Name	Nationality	Time	Notes
1	4	Yuliya Yefimova	Russia	1:04.36	Q, NR
2	5	Katie Meili	United States	1:05.48	Q
3	3	Jessica Vall	Spain	1:06.62	Q
4	6	Rachel Nicol	Canada	1:07.03	
5	2	Satomi Suzuki	Japan	1:07.08	
6	1	Arianna Castiglioni	Italy	1:07.19	
7	8	Reona Aoki	Japan	1:07.43	
8	7	Jennie Johansson	Sweden	1:07.93	

==== Semifinal 2 ====
Rank	Lane	Name	Nationality	Time	Notes
1	4	Lilly King	United States	1:04.53	Q
2	5	Rūta Meilutytė	Lithuania	1:05.06	Q
3	6	Shi Jinglin	China	1:06.47	Q
4	8	Kierra Smith	Canada	1:06.62	Q
5	7	Sarah Vasey	Great Britain	1:06.81	Q
6	3	Taylor McKeown	Australia	1:06.93	
7	2	Jessica Hansen	Australia	1:07.21	
8	1	Rikke Møller Pedersen	Denmark	1:07.92	

=== Final ===
The final was held on 25 July at 19:17.

Rank	Lane	Name	Nationality	Time	Notes
1st place, gold medalist(s)	5	Lilly King	United States	1:04.13	WR
2nd place, silver medalist(s)	6	Katie Meili	United States	1:05.03	
3rd place, bronze medalist(s)	4	Yuliya Yefimova	Russia	1:05.05	
4	3	Rūta Meilutytė	Lithuania	1:05.65	
5	2	Shi Jinglin	China	1:06.43	
6	1	Kierra Smith	Canada	1:06.90	
7	7	Jessica Vall	Spain	1:06.95	
8	8	Sarah Vasey	Great Britain	1:07.19	
