= Robyn Kinghorn =

South African swimmer

Personal information
- Born: 10 August 1999 (age 26)

Sport
- Sport: Swimming

Robyn Kinghorn (born 10 August 1999) is a South African swimmer. She represented South Africa at the 2017 World Aquatics Championships in Budapest, Hungary and at the 2019 World Aquatics Championships in Gwangju, South Korea. In 2019, she competed in the women's 10 km event and finished in 46th place. She also competed in the women's 5 km event and finished in 42nd place.
