= Rosie Rudin =

British swimmer (born 1998)

Personal information
- Nationality: British
- Born: 14 August 1998 (age 28)

Sport
- Sport: Swimming

Rosie Rudin (born 14 August 1998) is a British swimmer. She competed in the women's 200 metre backstroke event at the 2017 World Aquatics Championships.
