= Bobbi Gichard =

New Zealand swimmer

Personal information
- Nationality: New Zealand
- Born: 29 November 1999 (age 26) Hastings, New Zealand

Sport
- Sport: Swimming

Bobbi Gichard (born 29 November 1999) is a New Zealand swimmer. She competed in the women's 200 metre backstroke event at the 2017 World Aquatics Championships. She also competed at the 2018 Commonwealth Games in the 100 metre backstroke and 200 metre backstroke and was the lead-off swimmer for the New Zealand team which finish sixth in the final of 4 × 100 metre medley relay.
