= Natasha Lloyd =

New Zealand swimmer

Personal information
- Born: 23 December 1995 (age 30)

Sport
- Sport: Swimming

Natasha Lloyd (born 23 December 1995) is a New Zealand swimmer.

Lloyd received her secondary education at St. Andrew's College in Christchurch. In 2013, she broke the long-standing women's aged 17 100 m breaststroke record that had been set by Anna Wilson in 1995.

Lloyd competed in the women's 100 metre breaststroke event at the 2017 World Aquatics Championships.
