= Dawid Szwedzki =

Polish swimmer

Personal information
- Born: 18 April 1994 (age 32)

Sport
- Sport: Swimming
Medal record
Men's swimming
Representing Poland
Military World Games
Bronze medal – third place	2019 Wuhan	400 m medley
Bronze medal – third place	2019 Wuhan	4×100 m medley

Dawid Szwedzki (born 18 April 1994) is a Polish swimmer. He competed in the men's 200 metre individual medley event at the 2017 World Aquatics Championships.
