= Open water swimming at the 2017 World Aquatics Championships – Women's 25 km =

Women's 25 km at the 2017 World Aquatics Championships
- Venue: Lake Balaton
- Location: Hungary
- Dates: 21 July
- Competitors: 22 from 15 nations
- Winning time: 5:21:58.40

Medalists
gold medal	Ana Marcela Cunha	Brazil
silver medal	Sharon van Rouwendaal	Netherlands
bronze medal	Arianna Bridi	Italy

The Women's 25 km competition at the 2017 World Championships was held on 21 July 2017.

== Results ==
The race was started at 08:45.

Rank	Swimmer	Nationality	Time
1st place, gold medalist(s)	Ana Marcela Cunha	Brazil	5:21:58.40
2nd place, silver medalist(s)	Sharon van Rouwendaal	Netherlands	5:22:00.80
3rd place, bronze medalist(s)	Arianna Bridi	Italy	5:22:08.20
4	Martina Grimaldi	Italy	5:23:54.60
5	Anna Olasz	Hungary	5:23:55.00
6	Anastasiya Krapyvina	Russia	5:24:03.70
7	Becca Mann	United States	5:27:06.90
8	Aurélie Muller	France	5:28:25.30
9	Chelsea Gubecka	Australia	5:28:41.60
10	Cathryn Salladin	United States	5:29:49.70
11	Lenka Štěrbová	Czech Republic	5:33:04.60
12	Onon Sömenek	Hungary	5:33:05.80
13	Lara Grangeon	France	5:33:12.00
14	Sarah Bosslet	Germany	5:33:19.70
15	Yumi Kida	Japan	5:39:31.50
16	Nataly Caldas	Ecuador	5:42:38.40
17	Valeriia Ermakova	Russia	5:45:13.90
18	Xeniya Romanchuk	Kazakhstan	5:45:56.70
19	Betina Lorscheitter	Brazil	6:05:20.00
—	Mahina Valdivia	Chile	Did not finish
—	Vicenia Navarro	Venezuela	Did not finish
—	Angela Maurer	Germany	Did not start
