= Open water swimming at the 2017 World Aquatics Championships – Mixed 5 km team relay =

Mixed 5 km team relay at the 2017 World Aquatics Championships
- Venue: Lake Balaton
- Location: Hungary
- Dates: 20 July
- Competitors: 76 from 19 nations
- Teams: 19
- Winning time: 54:05.9

Medalists
| gold medal | Océane Cassignol; Logan Fontaine; Aurélie Muller; Marc-Antoine Olivier | France |
| silver medal | Brendan Casey; Ashley Twichell; Haley Anderson; Jordan Wilimovsky | United States |
| bronze medal | Rachele Bruni; Giulia Gabbrielleschi; Federico Vanelli; Mario Sanzullo | Italy |

The mixed 5 km team relay competition at the 2017 World Championships was held on 20 July 2017 in Lake Balaton, Hungary. France won gold with a time of 54:05.9, the United States finished second with 54:18.1, and Italy finished third with 54:31.0.

== Race ==
The race took place on 20 July at 10:00 CEST in Lake Balaton, Hungary. Each national team consisted of two men and two women, who could swim in any order. Each athlete swam 1.25 km, meaning each team completed 5 km in total. It was the first time this event was contested at the World Aquatics Championships.

France were in 11th position at the end of the first leg, then moved up to fourth by the end of the second leg, and then to second behind only Great Britain going into the last leg. Marc-Antoine Olivier swam the final leg and won gold for France with a total time of 54:05.9. Ailish Dougherty from Swimming World called France's victory "decisive".

Brendan Casey swam the fastest first leg to put the United States in the lead going into the changeover. After the US dropped to, and then remained in fifth over the second and third legs, Jordan Wilimovsky swam the final leg for the United States three seconds faster than France, but the three seconds was not enough to catch Olivier, and the US won silver with 54:18.1.

Italy allocated women for the first two legs, and they were thirteenth at the halfway mark, before Federico Vanelli overtook ten swimmers over the third leg to put them in podium position. They won bronze with 54:31.0.

France's victory earned them their fifth medal and third gold of the open water events at the Championships. Ashley Twichell's silver as part of the US team was her fourth World Championship open water swimming medal. As of 2017, this was more than any other US athlete in open water swimming.

Results
| Rank | Nation | Swimmers (Note: Ordered according to the order they swam in) | Time |
|---|---|---|---|
| 1st place, gold medalist(s) | France | Océane Cassignol; Logan Fontaine; Aurélie Muller; Marc-Antoine Olivier | 54:05.9 |
| 2nd place, silver medalist(s) | United States | Brendan Casey; Ashley Twichell; Haley Anderson; Jordan Wilimovsky | 54:18.1 |
| 3rd place, bronze medalist(s) | Italy | Rachele Bruni; Giulia Gabbrielleschi; Federico Vanelli; Mario Sanzullo | 54:31.0 |
| 4 | Australia | Kareena Lee; Jack Brazier; Kiah Melverton; Jack McLoughlin | 54:42.9 |
| 5 | Great Britain | Danielle Huskisson; Tobias Robinson; Timothy Shuttleworth; Alice Dearing | 54:51.1 |
| 6 | Brazil | Allan do Carmo; Viviane Jungblut; Ana Marcela Cunha; Fernando Ponte | 55:19.6 |
| 7 | Hungary | Janka Juhász; Kristóf Rasovszky; Melinda Novoszáth; Gergely Gyurta | 55:23.7 |
| 8 | Germany | Finnia Wunram; Leonie Beck; Sören Meißner; Rob Muffels | 55:41.8 |
| 9 | Japan | Yohsuke Miyamoto; Yasunari Hirai; Yukimi Moriyama; Minami Niikura | 55:54.0 |
| 10 | Russia | Sergey Bolshakov; Daria Kulik; Kirill Abrosimov; Mariia Novikova | 55:55.1 |
| 11 | Canada | Richard Weinberger; Stephanie Horner; Eric Hedlin; Breanne Siwicki | 55:58.3 |
| 12 | South Africa | Danie Marais; Chad Ho; Michelle Weber; Robyn Kinghorn | 56:05.3 |
| 13 | Argentina | Joaquín Moreno; Cecilia Biagioli; Julia Arino; Guillermo Bertola | 56:43.4 |
| 14 | Ecuador | David Castro; Patricia Guerrero; Iván Enderica Ochoa; Samantha Arévalo | 58:01.2 |
| 15 | Israel | Yuval Safra; Shahar Resman; Chaya Zabludoff; Eden Girloanta | 58:20.7 |
| 16 | Czech Republic | Matěj Kozubek; Vit Ingeduld; Alena Benešová; Lenka Štěrbová | 58:32.2 |
| 17 | Mexico | Arturo Pérez; Martha Sandoval; Alfredo Villa; María Mata | 58:32.5 |
| 18 | Kazakhstan | Kenessary Kenenbayev; Xeniya Romanchuk; Nina Rakhimova; Lev Cherepanov | 1:00:59.3 |
| 19 | Hong Kong | Keith Sin; Tse Tsz Fung; Lok Hoi Man; Nip Tsz Yin | 1:02:11.7 |

== Further information ==
- "U.S. Strikes Silver In Fina World Championships 5K Team Relay". USA Swimming. 20 July 2017. Archived from the original on 17 October 2025. – Quotes from the United States swimmers after the race
- "17e championnats du monde – J7 Du 14 au 30 juillet 2017 à Budapest" (PDF) (Press release). French Swimming Federation. 20 July 2017. Archived (PDF) from the original on 17 October 2025. – Quotes from the French swimmers after the race
- "Natation: trois titres, cinq médailles, le cocktail gagnant de l'eau libre". La Dépêche du Midi. 20 July 2017. ISSN 2426-6388. Archived from the original on 14 April 2021. – Further information on the French team and their training for this event
- Arcobelli, Stefano (10 July 2017). "World Swimming Championships: Italy wins bronze in the mixed relay". La Gazzetta dello Sport. ISSN 1120-5067. Archived from the original on 18 October 2025. – Further information on the Italian race and quotes from the Italian swimmers
- Horváth, Gábor (20 July 2017). "Rasovszky ismét nagyot úszott - Francia arany, magyar hetedik hely Balatonfüreden". Veszprém County News Portal. Archived from the original on 18 October 2025. – Further information on the Hungarian race and quotes from the Hungarian swimmers
