= France at the 2017 World Aquatics Championships =

- Flag of France
- World Aquatics code: FRA
- National federation: Fédération Française de Natation
- Website: www.ffnatation.fr

in Budapest, Hungary
- Competitors: 59 in 6 sports
- Medals Ranked 4th: Gold 6 Silver 1 Bronze 2 Total 9

World Aquatics Championships appearances
- 1973; 1975; 1978; 1982; 1986; 1991; 1994; 1998; 2001; 2003; 2005; 2007; 2009; 2011; 2013; 2015; 2017; 2019; 2022; 2023; 2024; 2025

France is scheduled to compete at the 2017 World Aquatics Championships in Budapest, Hungary from 14 July to 30 July. Participants are yet unknown.

== Medalists ==
Medal	Name	Sport	Event	Date
Gold	Marc-Antoine Olivier	Open water swimming	Men's 5 km	July 15
Gold	Aurélie Muller	Open water swimming	Women's 10 km	July 16
Gold	Laura Marino; Matthieu Rosset	Diving	Mixed team	July 18
Gold	Oceane Cassignol; Aurélie Muller; Logan Fontaine; Marc-Antoine Olivier	Open water swimming	Mixed team	July 20
Gold	Axel Reymond	Open water swimming	Men's 25 km	July 21
Gold	Camille Lacourt	Swimming	Men's 50 m backstroke	July 30
Silver	Aurélie Muller	Open water swimming	Women's 5 km	July 19
Bronze	Marc-Antoine Olivier	Open water swimming	Men's 10 km	July 18
Bronze	Mehdy Metella	Swimming	Men's 100 m freestyle	July 27

== Diving ==
France has entered 4 divers (three male and one female).

Individual

Athlete	Event	Preliminaries		Semifinals		Final	
Athlete	Event	Points	Rank	Points	Rank	Points	Rank
Matthieu Rosset	Men's 1 m springboard	358.80	15	—N/a		Did not advance	
Matthieu Rosset	Men's 3 m springboard	442.35	8 Q	443.55	9 Q	435.70	12
Benjamin Auffret	Men's 10 m platform	406.80	17 Q	467.70	7 Q	469.35	7
Loïs Szymczak	Men's 10 m platform	324.60	34	Did not advance			
Laura Marino	Women's 10 m platform	291.90	19	Did not advance			

Team

Athlete	Event	Final	
Athlete	Event	Points	Rank
Laura Marino; Matthieu Rosset	Team	406.40	1st place, gold medalist(s)

== High diving ==
France qualified one male high diver.

Athlete	Event	Points	Rank
Cyrille Oumedjkane	Men's high diving	194.85	21

== Open water swimming ==
France has entered seven open water swimmers

Athlete	Event	Time	Rank
David Aubry	Men's 10 km	1:52:01.9	6
Logan Fontaine	Men's 5 km	54:47:90	8
Logan Fontaine	Men's 25 km	Did not finish	
Marc-Antoine Olivier	Men's 5 km	54:31:40	1st place, gold medalist(s)
Marc-Antoine Olivier	Men's 10 km	1:51:59.2	3rd place, bronze medalist(s)
Axel Reymond	Men's 25 km	5:02:46.4	1st place, gold medalist(s)
Oceane Cassignol	Women's 10 km	2:03:01.7	22
Lara Grangeon	Women's 25 km	5:33:12.0	13
Aurélie Muller	Women's 5 km	59:10.5	2nd place, silver medalist(s)
Aurélie Muller	Women's 10 km	2:00:13.7	1st place, gold medalist(s)
Aurélie Muller	Women's 25 km	5:28:25.3	8
Oceane Cassignol; Aurélie Muller; Logan Fontaine; Marc-Antoine Olivier	Mixed team	54:05.9	1st place, gold medalist(s)

== Swimming ==
French swimmers have achieved qualifying standards in the following events (up to a maximum of 2 swimmers in each event at the A-standard entry time, and 1 at the B-standard):

Men

Athlete	Event	Heat		Semifinal		Final	
Athlete	Event	Time	Rank	Time	Rank	Time	Rank
Camille Lacourt	50 m backstroke	24.58	2 Q	24.30	1 Q	24.35	1st place, gold medalist(s)
Geoffroy Mathieu	100 m backstroke	56.38	33	Did not advance			
Geoffroy Mathieu	200 m backstroke	1:58.92	20	Did not advance			
Mehdy Metella	100 m freestyle	48.18	2 Q	47.65	1 Q	47.89	3rd place, bronze medalist(s)
Mehdy Metella	100 m butterfly	51.46	7 Q	51.06	5 Q	51.16	8
Jérémy Stravius	200 m freestyle	1:47.72	22	Did not advance			
Jérémy Stravius	50 m backstroke	24.80	5 Q	24.81	7 Q	24.61	4

Women

Athlete	Event	Heat		Semifinal		Final	
Athlete	Event	Time	Rank	Time	Rank	Time	Rank
Charlotte Bonnet	100 m freestyle	54.00	=10 Q	53.77	10	Did not advance	
Charlotte Bonnet	200 m freestyle	1:57.34	10 Q	1:56.28	7 Q	1:56.62	8
Mathilde Cini	50 m backstroke	28.79	32	Did not advance			
Mathilde Cini	100 m backstroke	1:00.70	17 q	1:00.44	15	Did not advance	
Béryl Gastaldello	100 m backstroke	1:02.24	=32	Did not advance			
Béryl Gastaldello	50 m butterfly	25.79	7 Q	26.01	15	Did not advance	
Béryl Gastaldello	100 m butterfly	58.97	21	Did not advance			
Mélanie Henique	50 m freestyle	DNS		Did not advance			
Mélanie Henique	50 m butterfly	25.81	8 Q	25.63	3 Q	25.76	6
Anna Santamans	50 m freestyle	24.71	8 Q	24.54	6 Q	24.58	=6

== Synchronized swimming ==
France's synchronized swimming team consisted of 12 athletes (12 female).

Women

Athlete	Event	Preliminaries		Final	
Athlete	Event	Points	Rank	Points	Rank
Eve Planeix	Solo free routine	84.7667	9 Q	84.6000	9
Charlotte Tremble; Laura Tremble	Duet technical routine	83.8932	11 Q	83.9734	11
Marie Annequin; Solene Lusseau; Estel-Anais Hubaud (R)	Duet free routine	83.6000	14	Did not advance	
Marie Annequin; Iphinoe Davvetas; Manon Disbeaux; Natalia Dorofeev (R); Estel-Anaïs Hubaud; Maureen Jenkins (R); Solene Lusseau; Eve Planeix; Charlotte Tremble; Laura Tremble	Team free routine	85.0333	10 Q	85.4667	10
Marie Annequin; Laura Auge; Iphinoe Davvetas; Manon Disbeaux; Natalia Dorofeev (R); Estel-Anaïs Hubaud; Maureen Jenkins (R); Solene Lusseau; Eve Planeix; Charlotte Tremble; Laura Tremble; Mathilde Vigneres	Free routine combination	85.3000	8 Q	85.0667	8

Legend: (R) = Reserve Athlete

== Water polo ==
France qualified both a men's and women's teams.

=== Men's tournament ===
Team roster

- Remi Garsau
- Remi Saudadier
- Igor Kovacevic
- Logan Piot
- Dino Guillaume
- Thibaut Simon
- Ugo Crousillat (C)
- Michal Izdinsky
- Mehdi Marzouki
- Manuel Laversanne
- Mathieu Peisson
- Alexandre Camarasa
- Hugo Fontani

Group play

Pos	Team	Pld	W	D	L	GF	GA	GD	Pts	Qualification
1	Hungary (H)	3	2	1	0	35	19	+16	5 (Note: Hungary placed higher because of better goal difference against Australia.)	Quarterfinals
2	Italy	3	2	1	0	40	23	+17	5	Playoffs
3	Australia	3	1	0	2	19	36	−17	2	Playoffs
4	France	3	0	0	3	26	42	−16	0	

Source: Sportresult
Rules for classification: 1) points; 2) head-to-head points; 3) head-to-head goal difference; 4) head-to-head number of goals scored; 5) better result against higher placed team.
(H) Hosts
Notes:

17 July 2017; 12:10	Report	France	9–18	Italy	Alfréd Hajós National Swimming Stadium, Budapest; Referees: Vojin Putniković (SRB), Frank Ohme (GER)
17 July 2017; 12:10	Report	Score by quarters: 2–5, 4–3, 1–7, 2–3			Alfréd Hajós National Swimming Stadium, Budapest; Referees: Vojin Putniković (SRB), Frank Ohme (GER)
17 July 2017; 12:10	Report	Crousillat 3	Goals	Di Fulvio 5	Alfréd Hajós National Swimming Stadium, Budapest; Referees: Vojin Putniković (SRB), Frank Ohme (GER)

19 July 2017; 09:30	Report	France	10–11	Australia	Alfréd Hajós National Swimming Stadium, Budapest; Referees: Vojin Putniković (SRB), Andrej Franulović (CRO)
19 July 2017; 09:30	Report	Score by quarters: 5–4, 1–2, 1–3, 3–2			Alfréd Hajós National Swimming Stadium, Budapest; Referees: Vojin Putniković (SRB), Andrej Franulović (CRO)
19 July 2017; 09:30	Report	Crousillat 3	Goals	Younger 3	Alfréd Hajós National Swimming Stadium, Budapest; Referees: Vojin Putniković (SRB), Andrej Franulović (CRO)

21 July 2017; 20:10	Report	France	7–13	Hungary	Alfréd Hajós National Swimming Stadium, Budapest; Referees: Radosław Koryzna (POL), Sergey Naumov (RUS)
21 July 2017; 20:10	Report	Score by quarters: 1–6, 3–2, 1–3, 2–2			Alfréd Hajós National Swimming Stadium, Budapest; Referees: Radosław Koryzna (POL), Sergey Naumov (RUS)
21 July 2017; 20:10	Report	Marzouki 4	Goals	Vámos 4	Alfréd Hajós National Swimming Stadium, Budapest; Referees: Radosław Koryzna (POL), Sergey Naumov (RUS)

13th–16th place semifinals

23 July 2017; 10:30	Report	Canada	6–10	France	Alfréd Hajós National Swimming Stadium, Budapest; Referees: Stanko Ivanovski (MNE), Matan Schwartz (ISR)
23 July 2017; 10:30	Report	Score by quarters: 4–3, 1–2, 1–2, 0–3			Alfréd Hajós National Swimming Stadium, Budapest; Referees: Stanko Ivanovski (MNE), Matan Schwartz (ISR)
23 July 2017; 10:30	Report	Thumwood 2	Goals	Crousillat, Marzouki 3	Alfréd Hajós National Swimming Stadium, Budapest; Referees: Stanko Ivanovski (MNE), Matan Schwartz (ISR)

13th place game

25 July 2017; 10:50	Report	France	8–11	United States	Alfréd Hajós National Swimming Stadium, Budapest; Referees: Péter Molnár (HUN), Viktor Salnichenko (KAZ)
25 July 2017; 10:50	Report	Score by quarters: 1–0, 2–3, 3–4, 2–4			Alfréd Hajós National Swimming Stadium, Budapest; Referees: Péter Molnár (HUN), Viktor Salnichenko (KAZ)
25 July 2017; 10:50	Report	Crousillat, Marzouki 2	Goals	Cupido 3	Alfréd Hajós National Swimming Stadium, Budapest; Referees: Péter Molnár (HUN), Viktor Salnichenko (KAZ)

=== Women's tournament ===
Team roster

- Lou Counil
- Estelle Millot
- Lea Bachelier
- Aurore Sacre
- Louise Guillet (C)
- Geraldine Mahieu
- Clementine Valverde
- Aurelie Battu
- Adeline Sacre
- Yaelle Deschampt
- Marie Barbieux
- Audrey Daule
- Lorene Derenty

Group play

Pos	Team	Pld	W	D	L	GF	GA	GD	Pts	Qualification
1	Hungary (H)	3	3	0	0	54	24	+30	6	Quarterfinals
2	Netherlands	3	2	0	1	45	20	+25	4	Playoffs
3	France	3	1	0	2	16	49	−33	2	Playoffs
4	Japan	3	0	0	3	27	49	−22	0	

Source: Sportresult
Rules for classification: 1) points; 2) head-to-head points; 3) head-to-head goal difference; 4) head-to-head number of goals scored; 5) Goal difference.
(H) Hosts

16 July 2017; 17:30	Report	Netherlands	17–2	France	Alfréd Hajós National Swimming Stadium, Budapest; Referees: Natacha Florestano (BRA), Ni Shiwei (CHN)
16 July 2017; 17:30	Report	Score by quarters: 7–0, 5–0, 3–1, 2–1			Alfréd Hajós National Swimming Stadium, Budapest; Referees: Natacha Florestano (BRA), Ni Shiwei (CHN)
16 July 2017; 17:30	Report	Klaassen 4	Goals	Mahieu, Millot 1	Alfréd Hajós National Swimming Stadium, Budapest; Referees: Natacha Florestano (BRA), Ni Shiwei (CHN)

18 July 2017; 20:10	Report	France	5–24	Hungary	Alfréd Hajós National Swimming Stadium, Budapest; Referees: Natacha Florestano (BRA), Ni Shiwei (CHN)
18 July 2017; 20:10	Report	Score by quarters: 0–7, 2–7, 3–6, 0–4			Alfréd Hajós National Swimming Stadium, Budapest; Referees: Natacha Florestano (BRA), Ni Shiwei (CHN)
18 July 2017; 20:10	Report	Millot 2	Goals	three players 4	Alfréd Hajós National Swimming Stadium, Budapest; Referees: Natacha Florestano (BRA), Ni Shiwei (CHN)

20 July 2017; 09:30	Report	Japan	8–9	France	Alfréd Hajós National Swimming Stadium, Budapest; Referees: Radoslaw Koryzna (POL), Francesc Buch (ESP)
20 July 2017; 09:30	Report	Score by quarters: 3–3, 0–3, 3–1, 2–2			Alfréd Hajós National Swimming Stadium, Budapest; Referees: Radoslaw Koryzna (POL), Francesc Buch (ESP)
20 July 2017; 09:30	Report	Inaba 3	Goals	Millot 4	Alfréd Hajós National Swimming Stadium, Budapest; Referees: Radoslaw Koryzna (POL), Francesc Buch (ESP)

Playoffs

22 July 2017; 22:00	Report	France	2–16	Australia	Alfréd Hajós National Swimming Stadium, Budapest; Referees: Dion Willis (RSA), Mikhail Dykman (CAN)
22 July 2017; 22:00	Report	Score by quarters: 0–5, 0–4, 1–1, 1–6			Alfréd Hajós National Swimming Stadium, Budapest; Referees: Dion Willis (RSA), Mikhail Dykman (CAN)
22 July 2017; 22:00	Report	Millot, Battu 1	Goals	Arancini 4	Alfréd Hajós National Swimming Stadium, Budapest; Referees: Dion Willis (RSA), Mikhail Dykman (CAN)

9th–12th place semifinals

24 July 2017; 13:30	Report	China	13–5	France	Alfréd Hajós National Swimming Stadium, Budapest; Referees: Natacha Florestano (BRA), Nader Ghafouri (IRI)
24 July 2017; 13:30	Report	Score by quarters: 3–2, 3–2, 4–1, 3–0			Alfréd Hajós National Swimming Stadium, Budapest; Referees: Natacha Florestano (BRA), Nader Ghafouri (IRI)
24 July 2017; 13:30	Report	Niu 3	Goals	Sacre 2	Alfréd Hajós National Swimming Stadium, Budapest; Referees: Natacha Florestano (BRA), Nader Ghafouri (IRI)

Eleventh place game

26 July 2017; 10:30	Report	New Zealand	7–9	France	Alfréd Hajós National Swimming Stadium, Budapest; Referees: Diego Garibaldi (ARG), Yosuke Kajiwara (JPN)
26 July 2017; 10:30	Report	Score by quarters: 1–0, 2–2, 1–5, 3–2			Alfréd Hajós National Swimming Stadium, Budapest; Referees: Diego Garibaldi (ARG), Yosuke Kajiwara (JPN)
26 July 2017; 10:30	Report	Lopes da Silva, Mason 2	Goals	Daule, Guillet 2	Alfréd Hajós National Swimming Stadium, Budapest; Referees: Diego Garibaldi (ARG), Yosuke Kajiwara (JPN)
