= Brazil at the 2017 World Aquatics Championships =

- Flag of Brazil
- World Aquatics code: BRA
- National federation: Confederação Brasileira de Desportos Aquáticos
- Website: www.cbda.org.br

in Budapest, Hungary
- Competitors: 61 in 6 sports
- Medals Ranked 10th: Gold 2 Silver 4 Bronze 2 Total 8

World Aquatics Championships appearances (overview)
- 1973; 1975; 1978; 1982; 1986; 1991; 1994; 1998; 2001; 2003; 2005; 2007; 2009; 2011; 2013; 2015; 2017; 2019; 2022; 2023; 2024; 2025

Brazil is scheduled to compete at the 2017 World Aquatics Championships in Budapest, Hungary from 14 July to 30 July.

== Medalists ==
Medal	Name	Sport	Event	Date
Gold	Ana Marcela Cunha	Open water swimming	Women's 25 km	July 21
Gold	Etiene Medeiros	Swimming	Women's 50 m backstroke	July 27
Silver	Marcelo Chierighini; César Cielo; Bruno Fratus; Gabriel Santos	Swimming	Men's 4 × 100 m freestyle relay	July 23
Silver	Nicholas Santos	Swimming	Men's 50 m butterfly	July 24
Silver	João Gomes Júnior	Swimming	Men's 50 m breaststroke	July 26
Silver	Bruno Fratus	Swimming	Men's 50 m freestyle	July 29
Bronze	Ana Marcela Cunha	Open water swimming	Women's 10 km	July 16
Bronze	Ana Marcela Cunha	Open water swimming	Women's 5 km	July 19

== Diving ==
Brazil has entered 6 divers (two male and four female).

Men

Athlete	Event	Preliminaries		Semifinals		Final	
Athlete	Event	Points	Rank	Points	Rank	Points	Rank
Ian Matos	1 m springboard	303.30	33	—N/a		did not advance	
Ian Matos	3 m springboard	338.65	37	did not advance			
Isaac Souza	10 m platform	348.90	29	did not advance			

Women

Athlete	Event	Preliminaries		Semifinals		Final	
Athlete	Event	Points	Rank	Points	Rank	Points	Rank
Luana Lira	1 m springboard	215.60	32	—N/a		did not advance	
Tammy Takagi	1 m springboard	214.40	33	—N/a		did not advance	
Luana Lira	3 m springboard	228.85	32	did not advance			
Tammy Takagi	3 m springboard	257.45	23	did not advance			
Ingrid Oliveira	10 m platform	228.00	37	did not advance			
Giovanna Pedroso	10 m platform	258.40	29	did not advance			
Luana Lira; Tammy Takagi	3 m synchronized springboard	265.20	11 Q	—N/a		247.05	12

Mixed

Athlete	Event	Final	
Athlete	Event	Points	Rank
Tammy Takagi; Ian Matos	3 m synchronized springboard	184.74	14

== High diving ==
Brazil qualified one male and one female high divers.

Athlete	Event	Points	Rank
Murilo Marques	Men's high diving	194.95	20
Jacqueline Valente	Women's high diving	253.40	8

== Open water swimming ==
Brazil has entered six open water swimmers

Athlete	Event	Time	Rank
Victor Colonese	Men's 5 km	55:46.3	39
Victor Colonese	Men's 25 km	5:27:14.2	22
Allan do Carmo	Men's 10 km	1:52:40.7	29
Allan do Carmo	Men's 25 km	5:06:55.7	13
Fernando Ponte	Men's 5 km	54:47.1	5
Fernando Ponte	Men's 10 km	1:52:35.5	19
Ana Marcela Cunha	Women's 5 km	59:11.4	3rd place, bronze medalist(s)
Ana Marcela Cunha	Women's 10 km	2:00:17.2	3rd place, bronze medalist(s)
Ana Marcela Cunha	Women's 25 km	5:21:58.4	1st place, gold medalist(s)
Viviane Jungblut	Women's 10 km	2:01:06.1	12
Betina Lorscheitter	Women's 5 km	1:01:14.1	20
Betina Lorscheitter	Women's 25 km	6:05:20.0	19
Ana Marcela Cunha; Viviane Jungblut; Allan do Carmo; Fernando Ponte	Mixed team	55:19.6	6

== Swimming ==
Brazilian swimmers have so far achieved qualifying standards in the following events (up to a maximum of 2 swimmers in each event at the Olympic Qualifying Time (OQT), and potentially 1 at the Olympic Selection Time (OST)):

A total of 16 swimmers, 13 men and 3 women, were named to the Brazilian team for the Worlds on May 11, 2017.

Men

Athlete	Event	Heat		Semifinal		Final	
Athlete	Event	Time	Rank	Time	Rank	Time	Rank
Bruno Fratus	50 m freestyle	21.51	1 Q	21.60	=3 Q	21.27	2nd place, silver medalist(s)
César Cielo	50 m freestyle	21.99	=9 Q	21.77	8 Q	21.83	8
Marcelo Chierighini	100 m freestyle	48.46	=5 Q	48.31	8 Q	48.11	=5
Gabriel Santos	100 m freestyle	48.64	12 Q	48.72	14	did not advance	
Guilherme Costa	1500 m freestyle	15:08.09	19	—N/a		did not advance	
Guilherme Guido	50 m backstroke	25.13	14 Q	24.91	12	did not advance	
Guilherme Guido	100 m backstroke	53.72	=7 Q	53.71	7 Q	53.66	7
João Gomes Júnior	50 m breaststroke	26.67 AM	3 Q	26.86	=5 Q	26.52 AM	2nd place, silver medalist(s)
João Gomes Júnior	100 m breaststroke	59.24	4 Q	59.56	11	did not advance	
Felipe Lima	50 m breaststroke	26.93	5 Q	26.68	2 Q	26.78	4
Felipe Lima	100 m breaststroke	59.62	10 Q	59.48	10	did not advance	
Nicholas Santos	50 m butterfly	23.24	5 Q	22.84	3 Q	22.79	2nd place, silver medalist(s)
Henrique Martins	50 m butterfly	23.34	6 Q	23.13	6 Q	23.14	6
Henrique Martins	100 m butterfly	51.48	8 Q	51.47	11	did not advance	
Leonardo de Deus	200 m backstroke	1:58.33	15 Q	1:57.89	12	did not advance	
Leonardo de Deus	200 m butterfly	1:56.71	16 Q	1:56.85	14	did not advance	
Thiago Simon	200 m breaststroke	2:14.23	26	did not advance			
Thiago Simon	200 m individual medley	2:01.01	19	did not advance			
Brandonn Almeida	400 m freestyle	3:49.61	18	—N/a		did not advance	
Brandonn Almeida	400 m individual medley	4:13.13	5 Q	—N/a		4:13.00	7
Marcelo Chierighini; César Cielo; Bruno Fratus; Gabriel Santos	4 × 100 m freestyle relay	3:12.34	1 Q	—N/a		3:10.34 SA	2nd place, silver medalist(s)
Marcelo Chierighini; Bruno Fratus*; João Gomes Júnior; Guilherme Guido; Felipe Lima*; Henrique Martins	4 × 100 m medley relay	3:32.38	5 Q	—N/a		3:31.53	5

Women

Athlete	Event	Heat		Semifinal		Final	
Athlete	Event	Time	Rank	Time	Rank	Time	Rank
Etiene Medeiros	50 m freestyle	25.26	21	did not advance			
Etiene Medeiros	50 m backstroke	27.65	=2 Q	27.18 AM	1 Q	27.14 AM	1st place, gold medalist(s)
Manuella Lyrio	100 m freestyle	55.32	22	did not advance			
Manuella Lyrio	200 m freestyle	1:59.24	21	did not advance			
Joanna Maranhão	400 m freestyle	4:11.06	14	—N/a		did not advance	
Joanna Maranhão	200 m butterfly	2:09.77	19	did not advance			
Joanna Maranhão	200 m individual medley	2:12.60	15 Q	2:11.24 SA	10	did not advance	
Joanna Maranhão	400 m individual medley	4:41.29	11	—N/a		did not advance	

== Synchronized swimming ==
Brazil's synchronized swimming team consisted of 5 athletes (1 male and 4 female).

Women

Athlete	Event	Preliminaries		Final	
Athlete	Event	Points	Rank	Points	Rank
Giovana Stephan	Solo technical routine	77.6135	14	did not advance	
Maria Clara Coutinho	Solo free routine	80.1333	15	did not advance	
Luisa Borges; Maria Clara Coutinho; Maria Eduarda Miccuci (R)	Duet technical routine	81.3024	15	did not advance	
Luisa Borges; Maria Clara Coutinho; Maria Eduarda Miccuci (R)	Duet free routine	82.8333	15	did not advance	

Mixed

Athlete	Event	Preliminaries		Final	
Athlete	Event	Points	Rank	Points	Rank
Giovana Stephan; Renan Souza	Duet technical routine	77.1826	7 Q	79.0853	7
Giovana Stephan; Renan Souza	Duet free routine	80.4000	7 Q	80.0667	7

Legend: (R) = Reserve Athlete

== Water polo ==
Brazil's men's water polo team qualified for the World Championships with a gold medal performance at the 2017 UANA Cup in Couva, Trinidad and Tobago.

=== Men's tournament ===
Team roster

- Slobodan Soro (C)
- Anderson Cruz
- Guilherme Almeida
- Gustavo Coutinho
- Luis Ricardo Silva
- Ricardo Guimarães
- Pedro Stellet
- Mateus Stellet
- Bernardo Rocha
- Heitor Carrulo
- Gustavo Guimarães
- Roberto Freitas
- Leonardo Silva

Group play

Pos	Team	Pld	W	D	L	GF	GA	GD	Pts	Qualification
1	Montenegro	3	2	1	0	35	18	+17	5	Quarterfinals
2	Brazil	3	1	1	1	17	22	−5	3	Playoffs
3	Kazakhstan	3	1	0	2	17	28	−11	2 (Note: Kazakhstan 10–9 Canada)	Playoffs
4	Canada	3	0	2	1	23	24	−1	2	

Source: Sportresult
Rules for classification: 1) points; 2) head-to-head points; 3) head-to-head goal difference; 4) head-to-head number of goals scored; 5) better result against higher placed team.
Notes:

17 July 2017; 09:30	Report	Brazil	6–2	Kazakhstan	Alfréd Hajós National Swimming Stadium, Budapest; Referees: Matan Schwartz (ISR), Yosuke Kajiwara (JPN)
17 July 2017; 09:30	Report	Score by quarters: 1–1, 0–1, 3–0, 2–0			Alfréd Hajós National Swimming Stadium, Budapest; Referees: Matan Schwartz (ISR), Yosuke Kajiwara (JPN)
17 July 2017; 09:30	Report	G. Guimarães 4	Goals	Turlykhanov, Ukumanov 1	Alfréd Hajós National Swimming Stadium, Budapest; Referees: Matan Schwartz (ISR), Yosuke Kajiwara (JPN)

19 July 2017; 21:30	Report	Brazil	5–14	Montenegro	Alfréd Hajós National Swimming Stadium, Budapest; Referees: Dion Willis (RSA), Yosuke Kajiwara (JPN)
19 July 2017; 21:30	Report	Score by quarters: 0–4, 2–3, 2–4, 1–3			Alfréd Hajós National Swimming Stadium, Budapest; Referees: Dion Willis (RSA), Yosuke Kajiwara (JPN)
19 July 2017; 21:30	Report	G. Guimarães 2	Goals	A. Radović 3	Alfréd Hajós National Swimming Stadium, Budapest; Referees: Dion Willis (RSA), Yosuke Kajiwara (JPN)

21 July 2017; 17:30	Report	Brazil	6–6	Canada	Alfréd Hajós National Swimming Stadium, Budapest; Referees: Andrej Franulović (CRO), Dion Willis (RSA)
21 July 2017; 17:30	Report	Score by quarters: 1–2, 3–2, 1–2, 1–0			Alfréd Hajós National Swimming Stadium, Budapest; Referees: Andrej Franulović (CRO), Dion Willis (RSA)
21 July 2017; 17:30	Report	Coutinho 2	Goals	six players 1	Alfréd Hajós National Swimming Stadium, Budapest; Referees: Andrej Franulović (CRO), Dion Willis (RSA)

Playoffs

23 July 2017; 13:30	Report	Brazil	3–8	Australia	Alfréd Hajós National Swimming Stadium, Budapest; Referees: Georgios Stavridis (GRE), Andrej Franulović (CRO)
23 July 2017; 13:30	Report	Score by quarters: 2–2, 0–2, 1–2, 0–2			Alfréd Hajós National Swimming Stadium, Budapest; Referees: Georgios Stavridis (GRE), Andrej Franulović (CRO)
23 July 2017; 13:30	Report	G. Guimarães 2	Goals	Kayes 3	Alfréd Hajós National Swimming Stadium, Budapest; Referees: Georgios Stavridis (GRE), Andrej Franulović (CRO)

9th–12th place semifinals

25 July 2017; 12:10	Report	Brazil	7–9	Japan	Alfréd Hajós National Swimming Stadium, Budapest; Referees: Diana Dutilh-Dumas (NED), Radosław Koryzna (POL)
25 July 2017; 12:10	Report	Score by quarters: 1–3, 3–4, 1–1, 2–1			Alfréd Hajós National Swimming Stadium, Budapest; Referees: Diana Dutilh-Dumas (NED), Radosław Koryzna (POL)
25 July 2017; 12:10	Report	Coutinho, Freitas 2	Goals	Adachi 3	Alfréd Hajós National Swimming Stadium, Budapest; Referees: Diana Dutilh-Dumas (NED), Radosław Koryzna (POL)

Eleventh place game

27 July 2017; 10:30	Report	Brazil	5–9	Kazakhstan	Alfréd Hajós National Swimming Stadium, Budapest; Referees: Andrej Franulović (CRO), Nader Ghafouri (IRI)
27 July 2017; 10:30	Report	Score by quarters: 1–4, 2–2, 0–1, 2–2			Alfréd Hajós National Swimming Stadium, Budapest; Referees: Andrej Franulović (CRO), Nader Ghafouri (IRI)
27 July 2017; 10:30	Report	Coutinho 2	Goals	Shakenov, Ukumanov 2	Alfréd Hajós National Swimming Stadium, Budapest; Referees: Andrej Franulović (CRO), Nader Ghafouri (IRI)

=== Women's tournament ===
Team roster

- Victória Chamorro
- Diana Abla
- Marina Zablith (C)
- Julia Souza
- Ana Alice Amaral
- Kemily Leão
- Samantha Ferreira
- Mylla Bruzzo
- Melani Dias
- Viviane Bahia
- Mariana Duarte
- Letícia Belorio
- Raquel Sá

Group play

Pos	Team	Pld	W	D	L	GF	GA	GD	Pts	Qualification
1	Italy	3	3	0	0	43	16	+27	6	Quarterfinals
2	Canada	3	2	0	1	29	24	+5	4	Playoffs
3	China	3	1	0	2	27	28	−1	2	Playoffs
4	Brazil	3	0	0	3	14	45	−31	0	

Source: Sportresult
Rules for classification: 1) points; 2) head-to-head points; 3) head-to-head goal difference; 4) head-to-head number of goals scored; 5) Goal difference.

16 July 2017; 10:50	Report	Brazil	4–11	China	Alfréd Hajós National Swimming Stadium, Budapest; Referees: Daniel Flahive (AUS), Frank Ohme (GER)
16 July 2017; 10:50	Report	Score by quarters: 2–4, 0–2, 2–1, 0–4			Alfréd Hajós National Swimming Stadium, Budapest; Referees: Daniel Flahive (AUS), Frank Ohme (GER)
16 July 2017; 10:50	Report	four players 1	Goals	Zhang C. 3	Alfréd Hajós National Swimming Stadium, Budapest; Referees: Daniel Flahive (AUS), Frank Ohme (GER)

18 July 2017; 21:30	Report	Italy	18–4	Brazil	Alfréd Hajós National Swimming Stadium, Budapest; Referees: Matan Schwartz (ISR), Viktor Salnichenko (KAZ)
18 July 2017; 21:30	Report	Score by quarters: 5–1, 6–1, 4–1, 3–1			Alfréd Hajós National Swimming Stadium, Budapest; Referees: Matan Schwartz (ISR), Viktor Salnichenko (KAZ)
18 July 2017; 21:30	Report	Emmolo, Palmieri 4	Goals	Zablith 2	Alfréd Hajós National Swimming Stadium, Budapest; Referees: Matan Schwartz (ISR), Viktor Salnichenko (KAZ)

20 July 2017; 17:30	Report	Brazil	6–16	Canada	Alfréd Hajós National Swimming Stadium, Budapest; Referees: Daniel Daners (URU), Benjamin Mercier (FRA)
20 July 2017; 17:30	Report	Score by quarters: 2–4, 1–4, 1–4, 1–4			Alfréd Hajós National Swimming Stadium, Budapest; Referees: Daniel Daners (URU), Benjamin Mercier (FRA)
20 July 2017; 17:30	Report	Ferreira 3	Goals	Christmas 5	Alfréd Hajós National Swimming Stadium, Budapest; Referees: Daniel Daners (URU), Benjamin Mercier (FRA)

13th–16th place semifinals

22 July 2017; 10:30	Report	Brazil	10–5	South Africa	Alfréd Hajós National Swimming Stadium, Budapest; Referees: Ni Shiwei (CHN), Daniel Daners (URU)
22 July 2017; 10:30	Report	Score by quarters: 3–1, 2–1, 3–1, 2–2			Alfréd Hajós National Swimming Stadium, Budapest; Referees: Ni Shiwei (CHN), Daniel Daners (URU)
22 July 2017; 10:30	Report	Abla 5	Goals	Hallendorff 2	Alfréd Hajós National Swimming Stadium, Budapest; Referees: Ni Shiwei (CHN), Daniel Daners (URU)

13th place game

24 July 2017; 10:50	Report	Brazil	9–11	Japan	Alfréd Hajós National Swimming Stadium, Budapest; Referees: Daniel Daners (URU), Dion Willis (RSA)
24 July 2017; 10:50	Report	Score by quarters: 2–2, 2–6, 2–1, 3–2			Alfréd Hajós National Swimming Stadium, Budapest; Referees: Daniel Daners (URU), Dion Willis (RSA)
24 July 2017; 10:50	Report	Abla 4	Goals	Sakanoue 4	Alfréd Hajós National Swimming Stadium, Budapest; Referees: Daniel Daners (URU), Dion Willis (RSA)
