= Italy at the 2017 World Aquatics Championships =

- Flag of Italy
- World Aquatics code: ITA
- National federation: Federazione Italiana Nuoto
- Website: www.federnuoto.it

in Budapest, Hungary
- Competitors: 89 in 6 sports
- Medals Ranked 6th: Gold 4 Silver 3 Bronze 9 Total 16

World Aquatics Championships appearances (overview)
- 1973; 1975; 1978; 1982; 1986; 1991; 1994; 1998; 2001; 2003; 2005; 2007; 2009; 2011; 2013; 2015; 2017; 2019; 2022; 2023; 2024; 2025

Italy competed at the 2017 World Aquatics Championships in Budapest, Hungary from 14 July to 30 July. Like the previous edition in 2015, it won at least one medal in all but one discipline: this time, both waterpolo teams were eliminated in quarterfinals, while in high diving Alessandro De Rose won the bronze, the first medal for Italy in this discipline.

== Medalists ==
Medal	Name	Sport	Event	Date
Gold	Manila Flamini; Giorgio Minisini	Synchronized swimming	Mixed duet technical routine	July 17
Gold	Federica Pellegrini	Swimming	Women's 200 m freestyle	July 26
Gold	Gabriele Detti	Swimming	Men's 800 m freestyle	July 26
Gold	Gregorio Paltrinieri	Swimming	Men's 1500 m freestyle	July 30
Silver	Mario Sanzullo	Open water swimming	Men's 5 km	July 15
Silver	Matteo Furlan	Open water swimming	Men's 25 km	July 21
Silver	Mariangela Perrupato; Giorgio Minisini	Synchronized swimming	Mixed duet free routine	July 22
Bronze	Elena Bertocchi	Diving	Women's 1 m springboard	July 15
Bronze	Arianna Bridi	Open water swimming	Women's 10 km	July 16
Bronze	Giovanni Tocci	Diving	Men's 1 m springboard	July 16
Bronze	Mario Sanzullo; Federico Vanelli; Rachele Bruni; Giulia Gabbrielleschi	Open water swimming	Mixed team	July 20
Bronze	Arianna Bridi	Open water swimming	Women's 25 km	July 21
Bronze	Gabriele Detti	Swimming	Men's 400 m freestyle	July 23
Bronze	Simona Quadarella	Swimming	Women's 1500 m freestyle	July 25
Bronze	Gregorio Paltrinieri	Swimming	Men's 800 m freestyle	July 26
Bronze	Alessandro De Rose	High diving	Men's high diving	July 30

== Diving ==
Italy entered 11 divers (eight male and three female).

Men

Athlete	Event	Preliminaries		Semifinals		Final	
Athlete	Event	Points	Rank	Points	Rank	Points	Rank
Tommaso Rinaldi	1 m springboard	340.15	19	—N/a		Did not advance	
Giovanni Tocci	1 m springboard	410.60	3 Q	—N/a		444.25	3rd place, bronze medalist(s)
Adriano Cristofori	3 m springboard	284.85	50	Did not advance			
Giovanni Tocci	3 m springboard	388.05	24	Did not advance			
Vladimir Barbu	10 m platform	404.95	18 Q	380.30	15	Did not advance	
Mattia Placidi	10 m platform	346.00	30	Did not advance			
Gabriele Auber; Lorenzo Marsaglia	3 m synchronized springboard	374.40	12 Q	—N/a		368.64	11

Women

Athlete	Event	Preliminaries		Semifinals		Final	
Athlete	Event	Points	Rank	Points	Rank	Points	Rank
Elena Bertocchi	1 m springboard	263.05	4 Q	—N/a		296.40	3rd place, bronze medalist(s)
Chiara Pellacani	1 m springboard	216.15	31	—N/a		Did not advance	
Elena Bertocchi	3 m springboard	262.35	20	Did not advance			
Noemi Batki; Chiara Pellacani	10 m synchronized platform	262.50	12 Q	—N/a		269.16	11

Mixed

Athlete	Event	Final	
Athlete	Event	Points	Rank
Elena Bertocchi; Maicol Verzotto	3 m synchronized springboard	277.35	7
Noemi Batki; Maicol Verzotto	10 m synchronized platform	291.54	11
Noemi Batki; Giovanni Tocci	Team	342.90	9

== High diving ==
Italy qualified one male high diver.

Athlete	Event	Points	Rank
Alessandro De Rose	Men's high diving	379.65	3rd place, bronze medalist(s)

== Open water swimming ==
Italy entered ten open water swimmers.

Athlete	Event	Time	Rank
Matteo Furlan	Men's 25 km	5:02:47.0	2nd place, silver medalist(s)
Andrea Manzi	Men's 5 km	54:47.6	6
Simone Ruffini	Men's 10 km	1:52:07.7	7
Simone Ruffini	Men's 25 km	5:02:53.1	4
Mario Sanzullo	Men's 5 km	54:32.1	2nd place, silver medalist(s)
Federico Vanelli	Men's 10 km	1:52:21.0	10
Arianna Bridi	Women's 10 km	2:00:17.2	3rd place, bronze medalist(s)
Arianna Bridi	Women's 25 km	5:22:08.2	3rd place, bronze medalist(s)
Rachele Bruni	Women's 10 km	2:00:21.4	5
Martina Caramignoli	Women's 5 km	1:00:48.3	12
Giulia Gabbrielleschi	Women's 5 km	59:26.4	6
Martina Grimaldi	Women's 25 km	5:23:54.6	4
Martina Caramignoli; Giulia Gabbrielleschi; Mario Sanzullo; Federico Vanelli	Mixed team	54:31.0	3rd place, bronze medalist(s)

== Swimming ==
Italian swimmers achieved qualifying standards in the following events (up to a maximum of 2 swimmers in each event at the A-standard entry time, and 1 at the B-standard):

Men

Athlete	Event	Heat		Semifinal		Final	
Athlete	Event	Time	Rank	Time	Rank	Time	Rank
Giacomo Carini	100 m butterfly	53.13	35	Did not advance			
Giacomo Carini	200 m butterfly	1:56.52	12 Q	1:56.59	13	Did not advance	
Piero Codia	50 m butterfly	23.50	11 Q	23.41	10	Did not advance	
Piero Codia	100 m butterfly	51.09 NR	2 Q	51.45	10	Did not advance	
Gabriele Detti	400 m freestyle	3:45.72	7 Q	—N/a		3:43.93	3rd place, bronze medalist(s)
Gabriele Detti	800 m freestyle	7:49.67	6 Q	—N/a		7:40.77 EU	1st place, gold medalist(s)
Gabriele Detti	1500 m freestyle	14:50.10	3 Q	—N/a		14:52.07	4
Luca Dotto	50 m freestyle	21.98	8 Q	21.92	11	Did not advance	
Luca Dotto	100 m freestyle	48.91	22	Did not advance			
Nicolò Martinenghi	50 m breaststroke	27.08	9 Q	27.01	9	Did not advance	
Nicolò Martinenghi	100 m breaststroke	59.33 WJ	9 Q	59.41	9	Did not advance	
Filippo Megli	200 m freestyle	1:47.94	28	Did not advance			
Matteo Milli	50 m backstroke	25.24	18	Did not advance			
Matteo Milli	100 m backstroke	54.17	11 Q	54.44	16	Did not advance	
Gregorio Paltrinieri	800 m freestyle	7:45.31	1 Q	—N/a		7:42.44	3rd place, bronze medalist(s)
Gregorio Paltrinieri	1500 m freestyle	14:44.31	2 Q	—N/a		14:35.85	1st place, gold medalist(s)
Luca Pizzini	200 m breaststroke	2:09.86	6 Q	2:08.95	9	Did not advance	
Matteo Ristivo	200 m backstroke	1:58.37	17	Did not advance			
Fabio Scozzoli	50 m breaststroke	27.04	8 Q	26.96 NR	8 Q	26.91 NR	6
Fabio Scozzoli	100 m breaststroke	1:00.08	=18	Did not advance			
Federico Turrini	200 m individual medley	2:00.23	16 Q	1:59.56	14	Did not advance	
Federico Turrini	400 m individual medley	4:18.25	14	—N/a		Did not advance	
Ivano Vendrame	100 m freestyle	48.78	15 Q	48.71	13	Did not advance	
Luca Dotto; Filippo Magnini; Alessandro Miressi; Ivano Vendrame	4×100 m freestyle relay	3:13.26	4 Q	—N/a		DSQ	
Gabriele Detti; Luca Dotto; Filippo Megli; Filippo Magnini	4×200 m freestyle relay	7:09.53	5 Q	—N/a		7:09.44	6
Piero Codia; Nicolò Martinenghi; Matteo Milli; Alessandro Miressi	4×100 m medley relay	3:34.11	11	—N/a		Did not advance	

Women

Athlete	Event	Heat		Semifinal		Final	
Athlete	Event	Time	Rank	Time	Rank	Time	Rank
Ilaria Bianchi	100 m butterfly	57.98	9 Q	57.95	11	Did not advance	
Ilaria Bianchi	200 m butterfly	2:09.12	13 Q	DNS		Did not advance	
Martina Carraro	50 m breaststroke	30.92	13 Q	31.16	16	Did not advance	
Martina Carraro	100 m breaststroke	1:08.11	22	Did not advance			
Arianna Castiglioni	50 m breaststroke	30.33 NR	3 Q	30.46	=6 Q	30.74	7
Arianna Castiglioni	100 m breaststroke	1:07.43	=15 Q	1:07.19	12	Did not advance	
Silvia di Pietro	50 m freestyle	25.07	17	Did not advance			
Silvia di Pietro	100 m freestyle	54.74	19	Did not advance			
Silvia di Pietro	50 m butterfly	26.24	15 Q	26.06	16	Did not advance	
Alice Mizzau	200 m freestyle	2:00.10	24	Did not advance			
Margherita Panziera	100 m backstroke	1:01.03	20	Did not advance			
Margherita Panziera	200 m backstroke	2:09.43	9 Q	2:10.95	14	Did not advance	
Federica Pellegrini	100 m freestyle	53.92	9 Q	54.26	15	Did not advance	
Federica Pellegrini	200 m freestyle	1:56.07	1 Q	1:55.58	4 Q	1:54.73	1st place, gold medalist(s)
Stefania Pirozzi	200 m butterfly	2:08.84	8 Q	2:08.62	11	Did not advance	
Simona Quadarella	800 m freestyle	8:27.70	5 Q	—N/a		8:26.50	7
Simona Quadarella	1500 m freestyle	16:07.08	4 Q	—N/a		15:53.86	3rd place, bronze medalist(s)
Giorgia Biondani; Silvia di Pietro; Erika Ferraioli; Federica Pellegrini	4×100 m freestyle relay	3:39.08	10	—N/a		Did not advance	
Anna Mascolo; Alice Mizzau; Stefania Pirozzi; Simona Quadarella	4×200 m freestyle relay	8:02.82	9	—N/a		Did not advance	
Ilaria Bianchi; Arianna Castiglioni; Margherita Panziera; Federica Pellegrini	4×100 m medley relay	4:00.03	6 Q	—N/a		3:59.98	8

Mixed

Athlete	Event	Heat		Final	
Athlete	Event	Time	Rank	Time	Rank
Luca Dotto; Silvia di Pietro; Federica Pellegrini; Ivano Vendrame	4×100 m freestyle relay	3:25.71	5 Q	3:24.89	5
Ilaria Bianchi; Piero Codia*; Silvia di Pietro*; Federica Pellegrini; Nicolò Martinenghi; Matteo Milli; Margherita Panziera*	4×100 m medley relay	3:46.75	7 Q	3:46.33	8

== Synchronized swimming ==
Italy's synchronized swimming team consisted of 14 athletes (1 male and 13 female).

Women

Athlete	Event	Preliminaries		Final	
Athlete	Event	Points	Rank	Points	Rank
Linda Cerruti	Solo technical routine	87.8970	6 Q	88.3369	6
Linda Cerruti	Solo free routine	89.6000	6 Q	90.6000	5
Linda Cerruti; Costanza Ferro; Francesca Deidda (R)	Duet technical routine	87.8125	6 Q	89.2463	6
Linda Cerruti; Costanza Ferro; Francesca Deidda (R)	Duet free routine	90.7000	6 Q	90.5667	6
Beatrice Callegari; Domiziana Cavanna; Linda Cerruti; Francesca Deidda; Costanza Ferro; Manila Flamini; Gemma Galli; Mariangela Perrupato; Viola Musso (R); Alessia Pezone (R)	Team technical routine	89.5587	5 Q	90.7617	5
Beatrice Callegari; Linda Cerruti; Francesca Deidda; Costanza Ferro; Gemma Galli; Viola Musso; Alessia Pezone; Enrica Piccoli; Costanza di Camillo (R); Federica Sala (R)	Team free routine	90.4667	5 Q	91.7000	5
Beatrice Callegari; Domiziana Cavanna; Linda Cerruti; Francesca Deidda; Constanza di Camillo; Costanza Ferro; Manila Flamini; Viola Musso; Alessia Pezone; Federica Sala; Gemma Galli (R); Enrica Piccoli (R)	Free routine combination	90.7333	4 Q	91.6667	4

Mixed

Athlete	Event	Preliminaries		Final	
Athlete	Event	Points	Rank	Points	Rank
Manila Flamini; Giorgio Minisini	Duet technical routine	88.2492	2 Q	90.2979	1st place, gold medalist(s)
Mariangela Perrupato; Giorgio Minisini	Duet free routine	90.8333	2 Q	91.1000	2nd place, silver medalist(s)

Legend: (R) = Reserve Athlete

== Water polo ==
=== Men's tournament ===
Team roster

- Stefano Tempesti
- Francesco Di Fulvio
- Niccolo Gitto
- Pietro Figlioli
- Nicholas Presciutti
- Cristiano Mirachi
- Alessandro Nora
- Andrea Fondelli
- Vincenzo Renzuto Iodice
- Michaël Bodegas
- Matteo Aicardi
- Zeno Bertoli
- Goran Volarević

Group play

Pos	Team	Pld	W	D	L	GF	GA	GD	Pts	Qualification
1	Hungary (H)	3	2	1	0	35	19	+16	5 (Note: Hungary placed higher because of better goal difference against Australia.)	Quarterfinals
2	Italy	3	2	1	0	40	23	+17	5	Playoffs
3	Australia	3	1	0	2	19	36	−17	2	Playoffs
4	France	3	0	0	3	26	42	−16	0	

Source: Sportresult
Rules for classification: 1) points; 2) head-to-head points; 3) head-to-head goal difference; 4) head-to-head number of goals scored; 5) better result against higher placed team.
(H) Hosts
Notes:

17 July 2017; 12:10	Report	France	9–18	Italy	Alfréd Hajós National Swimming Stadium, Budapest; Referees: Vojin Putniković (SRB), Frank Ohme (GER)
17 July 2017; 12:10	Report	Score by quarters: 2–5, 4–3, 1–7, 2–3			Alfréd Hajós National Swimming Stadium, Budapest; Referees: Vojin Putniković (SRB), Frank Ohme (GER)
17 July 2017; 12:10	Report	Crousillat 3	Goals	Di Fulvio 5	Alfréd Hajós National Swimming Stadium, Budapest; Referees: Vojin Putniković (SRB), Frank Ohme (GER)

19 July 2017; 20:10	Report	Hungary	9–9	Italy	Alfréd Hajós National Swimming Stadium, Budapest; Referees: Sergey Naumov (RUS), Matan Schwartz (ISR)
19 July 2017; 20:10	Report	Score by quarters: 4–4, 2–1, 1–3, 2–1			Alfréd Hajós National Swimming Stadium, Budapest; Referees: Sergey Naumov (RUS), Matan Schwartz (ISR)
19 July 2017; 20:10	Report	Varga, Vámos 3	Goals	Renzuto 3	Alfréd Hajós National Swimming Stadium, Budapest; Referees: Sergey Naumov (RUS), Matan Schwartz (ISR)

21 July 2017; 21:30	Report	Australia	5–13	Italy	Alfréd Hajós National Swimming Stadium, Budapest; Referees: Francesc Buch (ESP), Stanko Ivanovski (MNE)
21 July 2017; 21:30	Report	Score by quarters: 2–5, 0–3, 3–2, 0–3			Alfréd Hajós National Swimming Stadium, Budapest; Referees: Francesc Buch (ESP), Stanko Ivanovski (MNE)
21 July 2017; 21:30	Report	five players 1	Goals	Figlioli, Bodegas 3	Alfréd Hajós National Swimming Stadium, Budapest; Referees: Francesc Buch (ESP), Stanko Ivanovski (MNE)

Playoffs

23 July 2017; 15:00	Report	Kazakhstan	7–12	Italy	Alfréd Hajós National Swimming Stadium, Budapest; Referees: Péter Molnár (HUN), Nader Ghafouri (IRI)
23 July 2017; 15:00	Report	Score by quarters: 1–3, 1–2, 1–4, 4–3			Alfréd Hajós National Swimming Stadium, Budapest; Referees: Péter Molnár (HUN), Nader Ghafouri (IRI)
23 July 2017; 15:00	Report	Shakenov 3	Goals	Mirarchi, Renzuto 3	Alfréd Hajós National Swimming Stadium, Budapest; Referees: Péter Molnár (HUN), Nader Ghafouri (IRI)

Quarterfinals

25 July 2017; 22:00	Report	Croatia	12–9	Italy	Alfréd Hajós National Swimming Stadium, Budapest; Referees: Georgios Stavridis (GRE), Matan Schwartz (ISR)
25 July 2017; 22:00	Report	Score by quarters: 3–2, 2–3, 3–1, 4–3			Alfréd Hajós National Swimming Stadium, Budapest; Referees: Georgios Stavridis (GRE), Matan Schwartz (ISR)
25 July 2017; 22:00	Report	García, Sukno 4	Goals	Renzuto 3	Alfréd Hajós National Swimming Stadium, Budapest; Referees: Georgios Stavridis (GRE), Matan Schwartz (ISR)

5th–8th place semifinals

27 July 2017; 15:00	Report	Australia	4–8	Italy	Alfréd Hajós National Swimming Stadium, Budapest; Referees: Péter Molnár (HUN), Vojin Putniković (SRB)
27 July 2017; 15:00	Report	Score by quarters: 2–4, 2–2, 1–1, 0–2			Alfréd Hajós National Swimming Stadium, Budapest; Referees: Péter Molnár (HUN), Vojin Putniković (SRB)
27 July 2017; 15:00	Report	Hollis 2	Goals	Di Fulvio, Figlioli 2	Alfréd Hajós National Swimming Stadium, Budapest; Referees: Péter Molnár (HUN), Vojin Putniković (SRB)

Fifth place game

29 July 2017; 13:30	Report	Montenegro	5–4	Italy	Alfréd Hajós National Swimming Stadium, Budapest; Referees: Georgios Stavridis (GRE), Francesc Buch (ESP)
29 July 2017; 13:30	Report	Score by quarters: 1–1, 1–1, 3–2, 0–0			Alfréd Hajós National Swimming Stadium, Budapest; Referees: Georgios Stavridis (GRE), Francesc Buch (ESP)
29 July 2017; 13:30	Report	Dr. Brguljan 3	Goals	Mirarchi 2	Alfréd Hajós National Swimming Stadium, Budapest; Referees: Georgios Stavridis (GRE), Francesc Buch (ESP)

=== Women's tournament ===
Team roster

- Giukia Gorlero
- Chiara Tabani
- Arianna Garibotti
- Elisa Queirolo
- Federica Radicchi
- Rosaria Aiello
- Domitilla Picozzi
- Roberta Bianconi
- Giulia Emmolo
- Valeria Palmieri
- Aleksandra Cotti
- Sara Dario
- Federica Eugenia Lavi

Group play

Pos	Team	Pld	W	D	L	GF	GA	GD	Pts	Qualification
1	Italy	3	3	0	0	43	16	+27	6	Quarterfinals
2	Canada	3	2	0	1	29	24	+5	4	Playoffs
3	China	3	1	0	2	27	28	−1	2	Playoffs
4	Brazil	3	0	0	3	14	45	−31	0	

Source: Sportresult
Rules for classification: 1) points; 2) head-to-head points; 3) head-to-head goal difference; 4) head-to-head number of goals scored; 5) Goal difference.

16 July 2017; 09:30	Report	Italy	10–4	Canada	Alfréd Hajós National Swimming Stadium, Budapest; Referees: Sergey Naumov (RUS), Benjamin Mercier (FRA)
16 July 2017; 09:30	Report	Score by quarters: 1–2, 2–0, 3–0, 4–2			Alfréd Hajós National Swimming Stadium, Budapest; Referees: Sergey Naumov (RUS), Benjamin Mercier (FRA)
16 July 2017; 09:30	Report	Bianconi 4	Goals	Eggens 2	Alfréd Hajós National Swimming Stadium, Budapest; Referees: Sergey Naumov (RUS), Benjamin Mercier (FRA)

18 July 2017; 21:30	Report	Italy	18–4	Brazil	Alfréd Hajós National Swimming Stadium, Budapest; Referees: Matan Schwartz (ISR), Viktor Salnichenko (KAZ)
18 July 2017; 21:30	Report	Score by quarters: 5–1, 6–1, 4–1, 3–1			Alfréd Hajós National Swimming Stadium, Budapest; Referees: Matan Schwartz (ISR), Viktor Salnichenko (KAZ)
18 July 2017; 21:30	Report	Emmolo, Palmieri 4	Goals	Zablith 2	Alfréd Hajós National Swimming Stadium, Budapest; Referees: Matan Schwartz (ISR), Viktor Salnichenko (KAZ)

20 July 2017; 13:30	Report	Italy	15–8	China	Alfréd Hajós National Swimming Stadium, Budapest; Referees: Sergey Naumov (RUS), Georgios Stavridis (GRE)
20 July 2017; 13:30	Report	Score by quarters: 3–2, 4–2, 6–0, 2–4			Alfréd Hajós National Swimming Stadium, Budapest; Referees: Sergey Naumov (RUS), Georgios Stavridis (GRE)
20 July 2017; 13:30	Report	Aiello, Palmieri 3	Goals	Chen 3	Alfréd Hajós National Swimming Stadium, Budapest; Referees: Sergey Naumov (RUS), Georgios Stavridis (GRE)

Quarterfinals

24 July 2017; 14:50	Report	Italy	8–9	Russia	Alfréd Hajós National Swimming Stadium, Budapest; Referees: Georgios Stavridis (GRE), Adrian Alexandrescu (ROU)
24 July 2017; 14:50	Report	Score by quarters: 0–3, 4–1, 3–3, 1–2			Alfréd Hajós National Swimming Stadium, Budapest; Referees: Georgios Stavridis (GRE), Adrian Alexandrescu (ROU)
24 July 2017; 14:50	Report	Emmolo 3	Goals	Ivanova 3	Alfréd Hajós National Swimming Stadium, Budapest; Referees: Georgios Stavridis (GRE), Adrian Alexandrescu (ROU)

5th–8th place semifinals

26 July 2017; 13:30	Report	Italy	11–11 ^{(7–6 PSO)} (PSO)	Australia	Alfréd Hajós National Swimming Stadium, Budapest; Referees: Sergey Naumov (RUS), Steven Rotsart (USA)
26 July 2017; 13:30	Report	Score by quarters: 5–3, 2–3, 1–3, 3–2 PSO: 7–6			Alfréd Hajós National Swimming Stadium, Budapest; Referees: Sergey Naumov (RUS), Steven Rotsart (USA)
26 July 2017; 13:30	Report	Bianconi 5	Goals	Webster 4	Alfréd Hajós National Swimming Stadium, Budapest; Referees: Sergey Naumov (RUS), Steven Rotsart (USA)

Fifth place game

28 July 2017; 13:30	Report	Italy	8–10	Hungary	Alfréd Hajós National Swimming Stadium, Budapest; Referees: Steven Rotsart (USA), Francesc Buch (ESP)
28 July 2017; 13:30	Report	Score by quarters: 2–3, 2–3, 2–2, 2–2			Alfréd Hajós National Swimming Stadium, Budapest; Referees: Steven Rotsart (USA), Francesc Buch (ESP)
28 July 2017; 13:30	Report	Bianconi, Garibotti 4	Goals	Keszthelyi 3	Alfréd Hajós National Swimming Stadium, Budapest; Referees: Steven Rotsart (USA), Francesc Buch (ESP)

== See also ==
- Italy at the World Aquatics Championships
