= Open water swimming at the 2017 World Aquatics Championships – Women's 5 km =

Women's 5 km at the 2017 World Aquatics Championships
- Venue: Lake Balaton
- Location: Hungary
- Dates: 19 July
- Competitors: 58 from 39 nations
- Winning time: 59:07.00

Medalists
gold medal	Ashley Twichell	United States
silver medal	Aurélie Muller	France
bronze medal	Ana Marcela Cunha	Brazil

The Women's 5 km competition at the 2017 World Championships was held on 19 July 2017.

== Results ==
The final was started at 10:00.

Rank	Swimmer	Nationality	Time
1st place, gold medalist(s)	Ashley Twichell	United States	59:07.0
2nd place, silver medalist(s)	Aurélie Muller	France	59:10.5
3rd place, bronze medalist(s)	Ana Marcela Cunha	Brazil	59:11.4
4	Sharon van Rouwendaal	Netherlands	59:11.5
5	Haley Anderson	United States	59:26.2
6	Giulia Gabbrielleschi	Italy	59:26.4
7	Michelle Weber	South Africa	59:27.5
7	Kiah Melverton	Australia	59:27.5
9	Kalliopi Araouzou	Greece	59:28.0
10	Kareena Lee	Australia	59:28.9
11	Finnia Wunram	Germany	59:32.1
12	Martina Caramignoli	Italy	1:00:48.3
13	Paula Ruiz	Spain	1:00:49.1
14	Valeriia Ermakova	Russia	1:00:51.9
15	Samantha Arévalo	Ecuador	1:00:52.9
16	Minami Niikura	Japan	1:00:55.0
17	Lei Shan	China	1:00:57.1
18	Špela Perše	Slovenia	1:01:12.3
19	Angelica María	Portugal	1:01:13.3
20	Betina Lorscheitter	Brazil	1:01:14.1
21	Yukimi Moriyama	Japan	1:01:14.5
22	Alena Benešová	Czech Republic	1:01:14.7
23	Krystyna Panchishko	Ukraine	1:01:24.4
24	Leonie Beck	Germany	1:01:26.4
25	Vânia Neves	Portugal	1:01:27.7
26	Lenka Štěrbová	Czech Republic	1:01:27.9
27	Janka Juhász	Hungary	1:01:52.5
28	Melinda Novoszáth	Hungary	1:01:57.3
29	Breanne Siwicki	Canada	1:01:59.8
30	Xeniya Romanchuk	Kazakhstan	1:02:00.3
31	María Mata	Mexico	1:02:02.5
32	Justyna Burska	Poland	1:02:02.5
33	Souad Cherouati	Algeria	1:02:02.5
34	Qu Fang	China	1:02:02.8
35	Mariia Novikova	Russia	1:02:03.1
36	Martha Aguilar	Mexico	1:02:04.9
37	Eden Girloanta	Israel	1:02:06.1
38	Charlotte Webby	New Zealand	1:02:07.6
39	María Bramont-Arias	Peru	1:02:08.2
40	Mayte Puca	Argentina	1:03:41.0
41	Robyn Kinghorn	South Africa	1:03:41.5
42	Chaya Zabludoff	Israel	1:03:44.3
43	Maryna Kyryk	Ukraine	1:03:51.3
44	Jelena Ječanski	Serbia	1:04:31.3
45	Mahina Valdivia	Chile	1:06:11.5
46	Sandy Atef	Egypt	1:06:11.8
47	Ruthseli Aponte	Venezuela	1:06:55.9
48	Lok Hoi Man	Hong Kong	1:07:05.2
49	Fatima Flores	El Salvador	1:07:09.4
50	Heba El-Khouly	Egypt	1:07:39.2
51	Patricia Guerrero	Ecuador	1:08:13.2
52	Nip Tsz Yin	Hong Kong	1:09:02.5
53	Karolína Balážiková	Slovakia	1:09:25.0
54	Nina Rakhimova	Kazakhstan	1:09:28.7
55	Merle Liivand	Estonia	1:11:25.8
56	Raquel Duran	Costa Rica	1:11:34.8
57	Cindy Toscano	Guatemala	1:11:55.7
—	Anna Jaeger	Azerbaijan	OTL
—	Alice Dearing	Great Britain	Did not start
—	Danielle Huskisson	Great Britain	Did not start
