= Open water swimming at the 2017 World Aquatics Championships – Men's 25 km =

Men's 25 km at the 2017 World Aquatics Championships
- Venue: Lake Balaton
- Location: Hungary
- Dates: 21 July
- Competitors: 28 from 18 nations
- Winning time: 5:02:46.4

Medalists
gold medal	Axel Reymond	France
silver medal	Matteo Furlan	Italy
bronze medal	Evgeny Drattsev	Russia

The Men's 25 km competition at the 2017 World Championships was held on 21 July 2017.

== Results ==
The race was started at 08:30.

Rank	Swimmer	Nationality	Time
1st place, gold medalist(s)	Axel Reymond	France	5:02:46.4
2nd place, silver medalist(s)	Matteo Furlan	Italy	5:02:47.0
3rd place, bronze medalist(s)	Evgeny Drattsev	Russia	5:02:49.8
4	Simone Ruffini	Italy	5:02:53.1
5	Chip Peterson	United States	5:03:43.0
6	Gergely Gyurta	Hungary	5:04:00.7
7	Vitaliy Khudyakov	Kazakhstan	5:04:36.1
8	Sergey Bolshakov	Russia	5:04:49.8
9	Marcel Schouten	Netherlands	5:04:53.0
10	Andreas Waschburger	Germany	5:06:14.1
11	Sören Meißner	Germany	5:06:20.4
12	Evgenij Pop Acev	(North Macedonia) Macedonia	5:06:23.4
13	Allan do Carmo	Brazil	5:06:55.7
14	Santiago Enderica	Ecuador	5:08:54.8
15	Yohsuke Miyamoto	Japan	5:11:32.1
16	Shahar Resman	Israel	5:11:35.1
17	Yuval Safra	Israel	5:12:26.5
18	Matěj Kozubek	Czech Republic	5:13:17.0
19	Taiki Nonaka	Japan	5:13:35.5
20	Guillermo Bertola	Argentina	5:13:46.9
21	Jack Brazier	Australia	5:16:35.0
22	Victor Colonese	Brazil	5:27:14.2
23	Haythem Abdelkhalek	Tunisia	5:42:50.7
24	Saleh Mohammad	Syria	5:47:08.2
25	Kenessary Kenenbayev	Kazakhstan	5:49:57.5
—	Simon Lamar	United States	Did not finish
—	Kristóf Rasovszky	Hungary	Did not finish
—	Logan Fontaine	France	Did not finish
