= Synchronized swimming at the 2017 World Aquatics Championships – Mixed duet free routine =

Mixed duet free routine at the 2017 World Aquatics Championships
- Venue: City Park
- Location: Budapest, Hungary
- Dates: 21 July (preliminaries); 22 July (final)
- Competitors: 22 from 11 nations
- Teams: 11
- Winning points: 92.6000

Medalists
gold medal	Mikhaela Kalancha; Aleksandr Maltsev	Russia
silver medal	Giorgio Minisini; Mariangela Perrupato	Italy
bronze medal	Bill May; Kanako Kitao	United States

The Mixed duet free routine competition at the 2017 World Championships was held on 21 and 22 July 2017.

== Results ==
The preliminary round was started on 21 July at 19:00. The final was held on 22 July at 19:00.

Green denotes finalists

Rank	Nation	Swimmers	Preliminary		Final	
Rank	Nation	Swimmers	Points	Rank	Points	Rank
1st place, gold medalist(s)	Russia	Mikhaela Kalancha; Aleksandr Maltsev	92.0000	1	92.6000	1
2nd place, silver medalist(s)	Italy	Giorgio Minisini; Mariangela Perrupato	90.8333	2	91.1000	2
3rd place, bronze medalist(s)	United States	Bill May; Kanako Spendlove	88.0333	3	88.7667	3
4	Japan	Atsushi Abe; Yumi Adachi	86.9333	4	88.0000	4
5	Spain	Berta Ferreras; Pau Ribes	85.5000	5	85.7333	5
6	Canada	Rene Prevost; Isabelle Rampling	83.0667	6	83.5667	6
7	Brazil	Renan Souza; Giovana Stephan	80.4000	7	80.0667	7
8	China	Sheng Shuwen; Shi Haoyu	76.5333	8	77.2333	8
9	Germany	Amelie Ebert; Niklas Stoepel	73.9667	9	74.5000	9
10	Greece	Vasileios Gkortsilas; Vasiliki Kofidi	69.7333	10	69.8333	10
11	Panama	Gabriela Bello; Alberto Pinto	60.2000	11	60.7667	11
