= Swimming at the 2017 World Aquatics Championships – Women's 200 metre freestyle =

Women's 200 metre freestyle at the 2017 World Aquatics Championships
- Venue: Danube Arena
- Location: Budapest, Hungary
- Dates: 25 July (heats and semifinals); 26 July (final)
- Competitors: 52 from 43 nations
- Winning time: 1:54.73

Medalists
gold medal	Federica Pellegrini	Italy
silver medal	Katie Ledecky	United States
silver medal	Emma McKeon	Australia

The Women's 200 metre freestyle competition at the 2017 World Championships was held on 25 and 26 July 2017.

== Records ==
Prior to the competition, the existing world and championship records were as follows.

World record	Federica Pellegrini (ITA)	1:52.98	Rome, Italy	29 July 2009
Competition record	Federica Pellegrini (ITA)	1:52.98	Rome, Italy	29 July 2009

== Results ==
=== Heats ===
The heats were held on 25 July at 09:49.

Rank	Heat	Lane	Name	Nationality	Time	Notes
1	5	4	Federica Pellegrini	Italy	1:56.07	Q
2	6	4	Katie Ledecky	United States	1:56.27	Q
3	5	6	Katinka Hosszú	Hungary	1:56.43	Q
4	4	4	Emma McKeon	Australia	1:56.61	Q
5	4	6	Siobhán Haughey	Hong Kong	1:56.62	Q, NR
6	4	3	Leah Smith	United States	1:57.04	Q
7	4	5	Femke Heemskerk	Netherlands	1:57.06	Q
8	6	3	Veronika Popova	Russia	1:57.06	Q
9	6	5	Michelle Coleman	Sweden	1:57.15	Q
10	5	5	Charlotte Bonnet	France	1:57.34	Q
11	6	2	Chihiro Igarashi	Japan	1:57.67	Q
12	6	6	Li Bingjie	China	1:57.79	Q
13	5	3	Ai Yanhan	China	1:58.04	Q
14	5	2	Katerine Savard	Canada	1:58.16	Q
15	4	7	Mary-Sophie Harvey	Canada	1:58.38	Q
16	6	1	Robin Neumann	Netherlands	1:58.66	Q
17	5	1	Ariarne Titmus	Australia	1:58.79	
18	4	8	Maria Ugolkova	Switzerland	1:59.13	
19	4	0	Andrea Murez	Israel	1:59.75	
20	4	1	Evelyn Verrasztó	Hungary	1:59.92	
21	4	2	Manuella Lyrio	Brazil	1:59.24	
22	5	8	Lee Ea-sop	South Korea	1:59.38	
23	6	8	Tomomi Aoki	Japan	1:59.44	
24	5	7	Alice Mizzau	Italy	2:00.10	
25	6	7	Anastasia Guzhenkova	Russia	2:00.24	
26	3	5	Diana Durães	Portugal	2:01.48	NR
27	6	0	Signe Bro	Denmark	2:02.23	
28	5	9	Anastasia Bogdanovski	North Macedonia	2:02.92	
29	6	9	Anna Kolářová	Czech Republic	2:02.99	
30	3	7	McKenna DeBever	Peru	2:03.16	
31	3	0	Monique Olivier	Luxembourg	2:03.26	
32	3	3	Helena Moreno	Costa Rica	2:03.58	
33	3	4	Jessica Camposano	Colombia	2:04.13	
34	4	9	Gaja Natlačen	Slovenia	2:04.22	
35	3	8	Ressa Dewi	Indonesia	2:05.25	
36	3	6	Nicole Oliva	Philippines	2:05.55	
37	3	2	Gabriela Santis	Guatemala	2:06.94	
38	2	6	Devyn Leask	Zimbabwe	2:08.13	
39	3	9	Nicole Rautemberg	Paraguay	2:08.42	
40	2	4	Lauren Hew	Cayman Islands	2:08.91	
41	1	6	Arianna Sanna	Dominican Republic	2:08.45	
42	2	2	Dara Al-Bakry	Jordan	2:10.62	
43	1	4	Sonia Tumiotto	Tanzania	2:11.01	
44	2	5	Tan Chi Yan	Macau	2:11.61	
45	2	3	Lani Cabrera	Barbados	2:11.77	
46	2	1	Ishani Senanayake	Sri Lanka	2:13.38	
47	2	8	Yusra Mardini	FINA Independent Athletes	2:15.80	
48	1	5	Diana Basho	Albania	2:22.86	
49	2	0	Bianca Mitchell	Antigua and Barbuda	2:24.67	
50	2	7	Osisang Chilton	Palau	2:25.83	
51	2	9	Tisa Shakya	Nepal	2:29.20	
52	1	3	Jin Ju Thompson	Northern Mariana Islands	2:36.47	
	3	1	Julia Hassler	Liechtenstein	DNS	
	5	0	Andreina Pinto	Venezuela	DNS	

=== Semifinals ===
The semifinal were held on 25 July at 18:44.

==== Semifinal 1 ====
Rank	Lane	Name	Nationality	Time	Notes
1	4	Katie Ledecky	United States	1:54.69	Q
2	5	Emma McKeon	Australia	1:54.99	Q
3	6	Veronika Popova	Russia	1:55.08	Q, NR
4	2	Charlotte Bonnet	France	1:56.28	Q
5	3	Leah Smith	United States	1:56.34	Q
6	7	Li Bingjie	China	1:57.11	
7	1	Katerine Savard	Canada	1:58.46	
8	8	Robin Neumann	Netherlands	1:58.80	

==== Semifinal 2 ====
Rank	Lane	Name	Nationality	Time	Notes
1	4	Federica Pellegrini	Italy	1:55.58	Q
2	5	Katinka Hosszú	Hungary	1:55.98	Q
3	3	Siobhán Haughey	Hong Kong	1:56.21	Q, NR
4	6	Femke Heemskerk	Netherlands	1:56.50	
5	1	Ai Yanhan	China	1:56.80	
6	2	Michelle Coleman	Sweden	1:57.48	
7	7	Chihiro Igarashi	Japan	1:57.96	
8	8	Mary-Sophie Harvey	Canada	1:58.15	

=== Final ===
The final was held on 26 July at 17:32.

Rank	Lane	Name	Nationality	Time	Notes
1st place, gold medalist(s)	6	Federica Pellegrini	Italy	1:54.73	
2nd place, silver medalist(s)	4	Katie Ledecky	United States	1:55.18	
2nd place, silver medalist(s)	5	Emma McKeon	Australia	1:55.18	
4	3	Veronika Popova	Russia	1:55.26	
5	7	Siobhán Haughey	Hong Kong	1:55.96	NR
6	8	Leah Smith	United States	1:56.06	
7	2	Katinka Hosszú	Hungary	1:56.35	
8	1	Charlotte Bonnet	France	1:56.62	
