= Lee Ea-sop =

South Korean swimmer

Personal information
- Born: 25 March 2000 (age 26)
- Height: 5’7

Sport
- Sport: Swimming

Lee Ea-sop (born 25 March 2000) is a South Korean swimmer. She competed in the women's 200 metre freestyle event at the 2017 World Aquatics Championships.
