= Synchronized swimming at the 2017 World Aquatics Championships – Mixed duet technical routine =

Mixed duet technical routine at the 2017 World Aquatics Championships
- Venue: City Park
- Location: Budapest, Hungary
- Dates: 15 July (preliminaries); 17 July (final)
- Competitors: 20 from 10 nations
- Teams: 10
- Winning points: 90.2979

Medalists
gold medal	Manila Flamini; Giorgio Minisini	Italy
silver medal	Mikhaela Kalancha; Aleksandr Maltsev	Russia
bronze medal	Bill May; Kanako Spendlove	United States

The Mixed duet technical routine competition at the 2017 World Championships was held on 15 and 17 July 2017.

== Results ==
The preliminary round was started on 15 July at 19:00. The final was held on 17 July at 11:00.

Green denotes finalists

Rank	Nation	Swimmers	Preliminary		Final	
Rank	Nation	Swimmers	Points	Rank	Points	Rank
1st place, gold medalist(s)	Italy	Manila Flamini; Giorgio Minisini	88.2492	2	90.2979	1
2nd place, silver medalist(s)	Russia	Mikhaela Kalancha; Aleksandr Maltsev	88.4847	1	90.2639	2
3rd place, bronze medalist(s)	United States	Bill May; Kanako Spendlove	87.9086	3	87.6682	3
4	Japan	Atsushi Abe; Yumi Adachi	84.8153	4	86.2679	4
5	Spain	Berta Ferreras; Pau Ribes	83.4865	5	84.3336	5
6	Canada	Rene Prevost; Isabelle Rampling	81.3330	6	82.3413	6
7	Brazil	Renan Souza; Giovana Stephan	77.1826	7	79.0853	7
8	Germany	Amelie Ebert; Niklas Stoepel	72.6988	8	70.3147	8
9	Greece	Vasileios Gkortsilas; Olga Kourgiantaki	68.1346	9	69.8654	9
10	Panama	Gabriela Bello; Alberto Pinto	59.5706	10	59.8113	10
