= Giorgi Biganishvili =

Georgian swimmer

Personal information
- Born: 25 August 1997 (age 28)

Sport
- Sport: Swimming

Giorgi Biganishvili (born 25 August 1997) is a Georgian swimmer. He competed in the men's 100 metre freestyle event at the 2017 World Aquatics Championships.
