= United States at the 2017 World Aquatics Championships =

- Flag of the United States
- World Aquatics code: USA
- National federation: United States Aquatic Sports
- Website: www.usaquaticsports.org

in Budapest, Hungary
- Competitors: 116 in 6 sports
- Medals Ranked 1st: Gold 21 Silver 12 Bronze 13 Total 46

World Aquatics Championships appearances
- 1973; 1975; 1978; 1982; 1986; 1991; 1994; 1998; 2001; 2003; 2005; 2007; 2009; 2011; 2013; 2015; 2017; 2019; 2022; 2023; 2024; 2025

United States were scheduled to compete at the 2017 World Aquatics Championships in Budapest, Hungary from 14 July to 30 July.

== Medalists ==
Medal	Name	Sport	Event	Date
Gold	Ashley Twichell	Open water swimming	Women's 5 km	July 19
Gold	Nathan Adrian; Zach Apple; Michael Chadwick; Caeleb Dressel; Townley Haas*; Blake Pieroni*	Swimming	Men's 4×100 m freestyle relay	July 23
Gold	Katie Ledecky	Swimming	Women's 400 m freestyle	July 23
Gold	Mallory Comerford; Katie Ledecky; Simone Manuel; Lia Neal; Olivia Smoliga*; Kelsi Worrell	Swimming	Women's 4×100 m freestyle relay	July 23
Gold	Katie Ledecky	Swimming	Women's 1500 m freestyle	July 25
Gold	Lilly King	Swimming	Women's 100 m breaststroke	July 25
Gold	Kevin Cordes*; Caeleb Dressel; Matt Grevers; Ryan Murphy*; Mallory Comerford*; Lilly King; Simone Manuel; Kelsi Worrell*	Swimming	Mixed 4 × 100 m medley relay	July 26
Gold	Chase Kalisz	Swimming	Men's 200 m individual medley	July 27
Gold	Caeleb Dressel	Swimming	Men's 100 m freestyle	July 27
Gold	Mallory Comerford; Katie Ledecky; Simone Manuel*; Melanie Margalis; Cierra Runge*; Leah Smith	Swimming	Women's 4×200 m freestyle relay	July 27
Gold	Simone Manuel	Swimming	Women's 100 m freestyle	July 28
Gold	United States women's national water polo team: Gabrielle Stone; Madeline Musselman; Melissa Seidemann; Rachel Fattal; Paige Hauschild; Maggie Steffens; Jordan Raney; Kiley Neushul; Aria Fischer; Jamie Neushul; Makenzie Fischer; Alys Williams; Amanda Longan	Water polo	Women's tournament	July 28
Gold	Caeleb Dressel	Swimming	Men's 50 m freestyle	July 29
Gold	Caeleb Dressel	Swimming	Men's 100 m butterfly	July 29
Gold	Katie Ledecky	Swimming	Women's 800 m freestyle	July 29
Gold	Nathan Adrian; Zach Apple*; Caeleb Dressel; Mallory Comerford; Simone Manuel; Lia Neal*	Swimming	Mixed 4×100 m freestyle relay	July 29
Gold	Steve LoBue	High diving	Men's high diving	July 30
Gold	Lilly King	Swimming	Women's 50 m breaststroke	July 30
Gold	Chase Kalisz	Swimming	Men's 400 m individual medley	July 30
Gold	Kathleen Baker; Mallory Comerford*; Sarah Gibson*; Lilly King; Simone Manuel; Katie Meili*; Olivia Smoliga*; Kelsi Worrell	Swimming	Women's 4 × 100 m medley relay	July 30
Gold	Nathan Adrian; Kevin Cordes; Caeleb Dressel; Matt Grevers; Townley Haas*; Cody Miller*; Ryan Murphy*; Tim Phillips*	Swimming	Men's 4 × 100 m medley relay	July 30
Silver	Jordan Wilimovsky	Open water swimming	Men's 10 km	July 18
Silver	Haley Anderson; Ashley Twichell; Brendan Casey; Jordan Wilimovsky	Open water swimming	Mixed team	July 20
Silver	Leah Smith	Swimming	Women's 400 m freestyle	July 23
Silver	Kevin Cordes	Swimming	Men's 100 m breaststroke	July 24
Silver	Townley Haas	Swimming	Men's 200 m freestyle	July 25
Silver	Kathleen Baker	Swimming	Women's 100 m backstroke	July 25
Silver	Matt Grevers	Swimming	Men's 100 m backstroke	July 25
Silver	Katie Meili	Swimming	Women's 100 m breaststroke	July 25
Silver	Katie Ledecky	Swimming	Women's 200 m freestyle	July 26
Silver	Nathan Adrian	Swimming	Men's 100 m freestyle	July 27
Silver	Ryan Murphy	Swimming	Men's 200 m backstroke	July 28
Silver	Bethany Galat	Swimming	Women's 200 m breaststroke	July 28
Bronze	Kanako Spendlove; Bill May	Synchronized swimming	Mixed duet technical routine	July 17
Bronze	Krysta Palmer; David Dinsmore	Diving	Mixed team	July 18
Bronze	Kanako Spendlove; Bill May	Synchronized swimming	Mixed duet free routine	July 22
Bronze	Kelsi Worrell	Swimming	Women's 100 m butterfly	July 24
Bronze	Madisyn Cox	Swimming	Women's 200 m individual medley	July 24
Bronze	Ryan Murphy	Swimming	Men's 100 m backstroke	July 25
Bronze	Jacob Pebley	Swimming	Men's 200 m backstroke	July 28
Bronze	Jack Conger; Conor Dwyer*; Zane Grothe; Townley Haas; Jay Litherland*; Blake Pieroni; Clark Smith	Swimming	Men's 4×200 m freestyle relay	July 28
Bronze	Kathleen Baker	Swimming	Women's 200 m backstroke	July 29
Bronze	Leah Smith	Swimming	Women's 800 m freestyle	July 29
Bronze	Katie Meili	Swimming	Women's 50 m breaststroke	July 30
Bronze	Simone Manuel	Swimming	Women's 50 m freestyle	July 30
Bronze	Matt Grevers	Swimming	Men's 50 m backstroke	July 30

== Awards ==
- 2017 FINA World Championships: Best Team

== Diving ==
United States has entered 16 divers (nine male and seven female).

Men

Athlete	Event	Preliminaries		Semifinals		Final	
Athlete	Event	Points	Rank	Points	Rank	Points	Rank
Michael Hixon	1 m springboard	384.80	5 Q	—		439.15	5
Steele Johnson	1 m springboard	360.15	12 Q	—		392.50	7
Michael Hixon	3 m springboard	397.45	20	Did not advance			
Steele Johnson	3 m springboard	409.65	17 Q	394.55	18	Did not advance	
David Dinsmore	10 m platform	429.95	12 Q	483.10	4 Q	479.75	6
Jordan Windle	10 m platform	351.75	26	Did not advance			
Sam Dorman; Michael Hixon	3 m synchronized springboard	410.10	3 Q	—		409.05	6
Steele Johnson; Brandon Loschiavo	10 m synchronized platform	406.53	6 Q	—		406.83	6

Women

Athlete	Event	Preliminaries		Semifinals		Final	
Athlete	Event	Points	Rank	Points	Rank	Points	Rank
Maria Coburn	1 m springboard	360.15	22	—		Did not advance	
Alison Gibson	1 m springboard	236.40	25	—		Did not advance	
Krysta Palmer	3 m springboard	216.70	37	Did not advance			
Brooke Schultz	3 m springboard	248.80	25	Did not advance			
Jessica Parratto	10 m platform	306.85	12 Q	322.75	=8 Q	302.35	11
Delaney Schnell	10 m platform	268.05	27	Did not advance			
Maria Coburn; Alison Gibson	3 m synchronized springboard	283.65	6 Q	—		252.42	11
Tarrin Gilliland; Jessica Parratto	10 m synchronized platform	293.70	6 Q	—		306.96	6

Mixed

Athlete	Event	Final	
Athlete	Event	Points	Rank
Lauren Reedy; Briadam Herrera	3 m synchronized springboard	270.06	=10
Tarrin Gilliland; Andrew Capobianco	10 m synchronized platform	300.12	10
Krysta Palmer; David Dinsmore	Team	395.90	3rd place, bronze medalist(s)

== High diving ==
United States qualified three male and three female high divers.

Athlete	Event	Points	Rank
David Coltouri	Men's high diving	340.00	10
Andy Jones	Men's high diving	368.05	4
Steve LoBue	Men's high diving	397.15	1st place, gold medalist(s)
Cesilie Carlton	Women's high diving	270.70	6
Ginger Huber	Women's high diving	246.90	9
Tara Tira	Women's high diving	299.50	4

== Open water swimming ==
The United States has entered ten open water swimmers

Athlete	Event	Time	Rank
Brendan Casey	Men's 10 km	1:52:18.6	9
Andrew Gemmell	Men's 5 km	54:59.3	17
David Heron	Men's 5 km	54:48.2	10
Simon Lamar	Men's 25 km	Did not finish	
Chip Peterson	Men's 25 km	5:03:43.0	5
Jordan Wilimovsky	Men's 10 km	1:51:58.6	2nd place, silver medalist(s)
Haley Anderson	Women's 5 km	59:26.2	5
Haley Anderson	Women's 10 km	2:00:25.9	6
Becca Mann	Women's 25 km	5:27:06.9	7
Cathryn Salladin	Women's 25 km	5:29:49.7	10
Ashley Twichell	Women's 5 km	59:07.0	1st place, gold medalist(s)
Ashley Twichell	Women's 10 km	2:00:41.3	10
Haley Anderson; Ashley Twichell; Brendan Casey; Jordan Wilimovsky	Mixed team	54:18.1	2nd place, silver medalist(s)

== Swimming ==
U.S. swimmers have achieved qualifying standards in the following events (up to a maximum of 2 swimmers in each event at the A-standard entry time, and 1 at the B-standard):

The U.S. team consists of 45 swimmers (24 men and 21 women).

Men

Athlete	Event	Heat		Semifinal		Final	
Athlete	Event	Time	Rank	Time	Rank	Time	Rank
Nathan Adrian	50 m freestyle	21.99	=9 Q	21.83	10	Did not advance	
Nathan Adrian	100 m freestyle	48.46	=5 Q	47.85	3 Q	47.87	2nd place, silver medalist(s)
Pace Clark	200 m butterfly	1:56.23	11 Q	1:55.82	9	Did not advance	
Jack Conger	200 m butterfly	1:56.00	8 Q	1:55.30	5 Q	1:54.88	5
Kevin Cordes	50 m breaststroke	26.83	4 Q	26.86	5 Q	26.80	5
Kevin Cordes	100 m breaststroke	59.15	3 Q	58.64 AM	2 Q	58.79	2nd place, silver medalist(s)
Kevin Cordes	200 m breaststroke	2:09.47	5 Q	2:08.40	5 Q	2:08.68	6
Abrahm DeVine	200 m individual medley	1:59.65	12 Q	1:58.01	10	Did not advance	
Caeleb Dressel	50 m freestyle	21.61	2 Q	21.29 NR	1 Q	21.15 NR	1st place, gold medalist(s)
Caeleb Dressel	100 m freestyle	48.26	3 Q	47.66	2 Q	47.17	1st place, gold medalist(s)
Caeleb Dressel	50 m butterfly	22.97	2 Q	22.76	1 Q	22.89	4
Caeleb Dressel	100 m butterfly	50.08	1 Q	50.07	1 Q	49.86	1st place, gold medalist(s)
Nic Fink	200 m breaststroke	2:09.90	7 Q	2:08.80	8 Q	2:08.56	5
Robert Finke	1500 m freestyle	15:15.15	21	—		Did not advance	
Matt Grevers	50 m backstroke	24.78	=3 Q	24.65	3 Q	24.56	3rd place, bronze medalist(s)
Matt Grevers	100 m backstroke	52.92	2 Q	52.97	3 Q	52.48	2nd place, silver medalist(s)
Zane Grothe	400 m freestyle	3:46.14	8 Q	—		3:45.86	7
Zane Grothe	800 m freestyle	7:50.97	8 Q	—		7:52.43	8
Townley Haas	200 m freestyle	1:46.50	4 Q	1:45.43	4 Q	1:45.04	2nd place, silver medalist(s)
Chase Kalisz	200 m individual medley	1:56.48	2 Q	1:55.88	1 Q	1:55.56	1st place, gold medalist(s)
Chase Kalisz	400 m individual medley	4:09.79	1 Q	—		4:05.90 CR	1st place, gold medalist(s)
Jay Litherland	400 m individual medley	4:13.95	6 Q	—		4:12.05	5
Cody Miller	50 m breaststroke	27.31	15 Q	27.46	16	Did not advance	
Cody Miller	100 m breaststroke	59.14	2 Q	59.08	3 Q	59.11	5
Ryan Murphy	100 m backstroke	53.26	4 Q	52.95	2 Q	52.59	3rd place, bronze medalist(s)
Ryan Murphy	200 m backstroke	1:56.11	1 Q	1:54.93	2 Q	1:54.21	2nd place, silver medalist(s)
Jacob Pebley	200 m backstroke	1:58.05	14 Q	1:55.20	5 Q	1:55.06	3rd place, bronze medalist(s)
Tim Phillips	50 m butterfly	23.38	7 Q	23.25	7 Q	23.38	8
Tim Phillips	100 m butterfly	51.96	16 Q	51.41	9	Did not advance	
Blake Pieroni	200 m freestyle	1:46.88	9 Q	1:47.08	13	Did not advance	
Justin Ress	50 m backstroke	24.86	=6 Q	24.70	5 Q	24.77	5
Clark Smith	400 m freestyle	3:47.12	12	—		Did not advance	
Clark Smith	800 m freestyle	7:51.83	10	—		Did not advance	
True Sweetser	1500 m freestyle	15:07.38	16	—		Did not advance	
Nathan Adrian; Zach Apple; Michael Chadwick; Caeleb Dressel; Townley Haas*; Blake Pieroni*	4×100 m freestyle relay	3:12.90	3 Q	—		3:10.06	1st place, gold medalist(s)
Jack Conger; Conor Dwyer*; Zane Grothe; Townley Haas; Jay Litherland*; Blake Pieroni; Clark Smith*	4×200 m freestyle relay	7:09.78	7 Q	—		7:03.18	3rd place, bronze medalist(s)
Nathan Adrian; Caeleb Dressel; Kevin Cordes; Matt Grevers; Townley Haas*; Cody Miller*; Ryan Murphy*; Tim Phillips*	4×100 m medley relay	3:29.66	1 Q	—		3:27.91	1st place, gold medalist(s)

Women

Athlete	Event	Heat		Semifinal		Final	
Athlete	Event	Time	Rank	Time	Rank	Time	Rank
Kathleen Baker	50 m backstroke	27.94	9 Q	27.48 NR	3 Q	27.50	5
Kathleen Baker	100 m backstroke	59.76	5 Q	59.03	3 Q	58.58	2nd place, silver medalist(s)
Kathleen Baker	200 m backstroke	2:06.82	1 Q	2:06.66	3 Q	2:06.48	3rd place, bronze medalist(s)
Elizabeth Beisel	400 m individual medley	4:36.18	3 Q	—		4:37.63	7
Mallory Comerford	100 m freestyle	53.42	5 Q	52.85	3 Q	52.77	4
Madisyn Cox	200 m individual medley	2:10.16	3 Q	2:09.97	6 Q	2:09.71	3rd place, bronze medalist(s)
Hali Flickinger	200 m butterfly	2:08.84	=8 Q	2:07.89	9	Did not advance	
Bethany Galat	200 m breaststroke	2:24.56	5 Q	2:21.86	2 Q	2:21.77	2nd place, silver medalist(s)
Sarah Gibson	50 m butterfly	26.65	=22	Did not advance			
Sarah Gibson	100 m butterfly	58.16	11 Q	58.48	15	Did not advance	
Lilly King	50 m breaststroke	29.76	1 Q	29.60 AM	1 Q	29.40 WR	1st place, gold medalist(s)
Lilly King	100 m breaststroke	1:05.20	1 Q	1:04.53	2 Q	1:04.13 WR	1st place, gold medalist(s)
Lilly King	200 m breaststroke	2:24.38	2 Q	2:23.81	8 Q	2:22.11	4
Katie Ledecky	200 m freestyle	1:56.27	2 Q	1:54.69	1 Q	1:55.16	2nd place, silver medalist(s)
Katie Ledecky	400 m freestyle	3:59.06	1 Q	—		3:58.34 CR	1st place, gold medalist(s)
Katie Ledecky	800 m freestyle	8:20.24	1 Q	—		8:12.68	1st place, gold medalist(s)
Katie Ledecky	1500 m freestyle	15:47.54	1 Q	—		15:31.82	1st place, gold medalist(s)
Dakota Luther	200 m butterfly	2:08.86	10 Q	2:09.55	15	Did not advance	
Simone Manuel	50 m freestyle	24.54	4 Q	24.12	3 Q	23.97 AM	3rd place, bronze medalist(s)
Simone Manuel	100 m freestyle	53.17	3 Q	52.69 AM	2 Q	52.27 AM	1st place, gold medalist(s)
Melanie Margalis	200 m individual medley	2:11.47	9 Q	2:08.70	2 Q	2:09.82	4
Katie Meili	50 m breaststroke	30.37	4 Q	30.12	3 Q	29.99	3rd place, bronze medalist(s)
Katie Meili	100 m breaststroke	1:06.39	4 Q	1:05.48	4 Q	1:05.03	2nd place, silver medalist(s)
Leah Smith	200 m freestyle	1:57.04	6 Q	1:56.34	8 Q	1:56.06	6
Leah Smith	400 m freestyle	4:02.00	2 Q	—		4:01.54	2nd place, silver medalist(s)
Leah Smith	800 m freestyle	8:21.19	2 Q	—		8:17.22	3rd place, bronze medalist(s)
Leah Smith	400 m individual medley	4:36.94	6 Q	—		4:36.09	6
Regan Smith	200 m backstroke	2:08.13	4 Q	2:07.19 WJ	5 Q	2:07.42	8
Olivia Smoliga	100 m backstroke	59.70	4 Q	59.07	4 Q	58.77	4
Hannah Stevens	50 m backstroke	27.89	7 Q	27.63	9	Did not advance	
Kelsi Worrell	50 m butterfly	25.65	2 Q	25.57	2 Q	25.48	4
Kelsi Worrell	100 m butterfly	56.44	2 Q	56.74	3 Q	56.37	3rd place, bronze medalist(s)
Abbey Weitzeil	50 m freestyle	24.92	13 Q	24.80	15	Did not advance	
Mallory Comerford*; Katie Ledecky; Simone Manuel; Lia Neal; Olivia Smoliga*; Kelsi Worrell	4×100 m freestyle relay	3:33.35	1 Q	—		3:31.72 AM	1st place, gold medalist(s)
Mallory Comerford; Katie Ledecky; Simone Manuel*; Melanie Margalis; Cierra Runge*; Leah Smith	4×200 m freestyle relay	7:53.73	3 Q	—		7:43.39	1st place, gold medalist(s)
Kathleen Baker; Mallory Comerford*; Sarah Gibson*; Lilly King; Katie Meili*; Simone Manuel; Olivia Smoliga*; Kelsi Worrell	4×100 m medley relay	3:55.95	1 Q	—		3:51.55 WR	1st place, gold medalist(s)

Mixed

Athlete	Event	Heat		Final	
Athlete	Event	Time	Rank	Time	Rank
Nathan Adrian; Caeleb Dressel; Mallory Comerford; Townley Haas*; Simone Manuel; Lia Neal*; Blake Pieroni*; Kelsi Worrell*	4×100 m freestyle relay	3:23.93	2 Q	3:19.60 WR	1st place, gold medalist(s)
Kevin Cordes*; Caeleb Dressel; Matt Grevers; Ryan Murphy*; Mallory Comerford*; Lilly King; Simone Manuel; Kelsi Worrell*	4×100 m medley relay	3:40.28 WR	1 Q	3:38.56 WR	1st place, gold medalist(s)

== Synchronized swimming ==
United States' synchronized swimming team consisted of 13 athletes (1 male and 12 female).

Women

Athlete	Event	Preliminaries		Final	
Athlete	Event	Points	Rank	Points	Rank
Anita Alvarez; Victoria Woroniecki	Duet technical routine	83.4526	12 Q	83.4715	12
Anita Alvarez; Victoria Woroniecki	Duet free routine	84.3000	11 Q	84.1333	11
Elizabeth Davidson; Nicole Dzurko; Rachel Jager; Jacklyn Luu; Louisa Strutynski; Alexandra Suarez (R); Karensa Tjoa; Natalia Vega Figueroa; Monica Velazquez-Stiak; Victoria Woroniecki (R)	Team technical routine	82.1080	11 Q	82.8546	11
Anita Alvarez; Elizabeth Davidson; Nicole Dzurko; Rachel Jager; Jacklyn Luu; Louisa Strutynski (R); Karensa Tjoa; Natalia Vega Figueroa; Monica Velazquez-Stiak; Victoria Woroniecki (R)	Team free routine	82.9667	12 Q	83.5667	12

Mixed

Athlete	Event	Preliminaries		Final	
Athlete	Event	Points	Rank	Points	Rank
Kanako Spendlove; Bill May	Duet technical routine	87.9086	3 Q	87.6682	3rd place, bronze medalist(s)
Kanako Spendlove; Bill May	Duet free routine	88.0333	3 Q	88.7667	3rd place, bronze medalist(s)

Legend: (R) = Reserve Athlete

== Water polo ==
The United States qualified both a men's and women's teams.

=== Men's tournament ===
Team roster

- McQuin Baron
- Johnathan Hooper
- Marko Vavic
- Alex Obert (C)
- Ben Hallock
- Luca Cupido
- Thomas Dunstan
- Nick Carniglia
- Alex Bowen
- Chancellor Ramirez
- Alex Roelse
- Maxwell Irving
- Drew Holland

Group play

Pos	Team	Pld	W	D	L	GF	GA	GD	Pts	Qualification
1	Croatia	3	3	0	0	38	21	+17	6	Quarterfinals
2	Russia	3	1	0	2	34	32	+2	2 (Note: Russia 2 Pts, +4 GD; Japan 2 Pts, +1 GD; United States 2 Pts, −5 GD)	Playoffs
3	Japan	3	1	0	2	29	38	−9	2	Playoffs
4	United States	3	1	0	2	28	38	−10	2	

Source: Sportresult
Rules for classification: 1) points; 2) head-to-head points; 3) head-to-head goal difference; 4) head-to-head number of goals scored; 5) better result against higher placed team.
Notes:

17 July 2017; 18:50	Report	United States	7–12	Croatia	Alfréd Hajós National Swimming Stadium, Budapest; Referees: Adrian Alexandrescu (ROU), Alessandro Severo (ITA)
17 July 2017; 18:50	Report	Score by quarters: 1–3, 2–4, 1–3, 3–2			Alfréd Hajós National Swimming Stadium, Budapest; Referees: Adrian Alexandrescu (ROU), Alessandro Severo (ITA)
17 July 2017; 18:50	Report	Bowen, Cupido 2	Goals	García, Lončar 4	Alfréd Hajós National Swimming Stadium, Budapest; Referees: Adrian Alexandrescu (ROU), Alessandro Severo (ITA)

19 July 2017; 17:30	Report	United States	7–15	Japan	Alfréd Hajós National Swimming Stadium, Budapest; Referees: Daniel Flahive (AUS), Benjamin Mercier (FRA)
19 July 2017; 17:30	Report	Score by quarters: 2–1, 2–5, 2–4, 1–5			Alfréd Hajós National Swimming Stadium, Budapest; Referees: Daniel Flahive (AUS), Benjamin Mercier (FRA)
19 July 2017; 17:30	Report	Dunstan, Hallock 2	Goals	Adachi 7	Alfréd Hajós National Swimming Stadium, Budapest; Referees: Daniel Flahive (AUS), Benjamin Mercier (FRA)

21 July 2017; 12:10	Report	United States	14–11	Russia	Alfréd Hajós National Swimming Stadium, Budapest; Referees: Alessandro Severo (ITA), Matan Schwartz (ISR)
21 July 2017; 12:10	Report	Score by quarters: 6–1, 3–5, 3–1, 2–4			Alfréd Hajós National Swimming Stadium, Budapest; Referees: Alessandro Severo (ITA), Matan Schwartz (ISR)
21 July 2017; 12:10	Report	Bowen, Cupido 4	Goals	four players 2	Alfréd Hajós National Swimming Stadium, Budapest; Referees: Alessandro Severo (ITA), Matan Schwartz (ISR)

13th–16th place semifinals

23 July 2017; 12:00	Report	South Africa	4–13	United States	Alfréd Hajós National Swimming Stadium, Budapest; Referees: Radosław Koryzna (POL), Maged El-Shamy (EGY)
23 July 2017; 12:00	Report	Score by quarters: 0–1, 3–6, 1–3, 0–3			Alfréd Hajós National Swimming Stadium, Budapest; Referees: Radosław Koryzna (POL), Maged El-Shamy (EGY)
23 July 2017; 12:00	Report	four players 1	Goals	Irving, Obert 3	Alfréd Hajós National Swimming Stadium, Budapest; Referees: Radosław Koryzna (POL), Maged El-Shamy (EGY)

13th place game

25 July 2017; 10:50	Report	France	8–11	United States	Alfréd Hajós National Swimming Stadium, Budapest; Referees: Péter Molnár (HUN), Viktor Salnichenko (KAZ)
25 July 2017; 10:50	Report	Score by quarters: 1–0, 2–3, 3–4, 2–4			Alfréd Hajós National Swimming Stadium, Budapest; Referees: Péter Molnár (HUN), Viktor Salnichenko (KAZ)
25 July 2017; 10:50	Report	Crousillat, Marzouki 2	Goals	Cupido 3	Alfréd Hajós National Swimming Stadium, Budapest; Referees: Péter Molnár (HUN), Viktor Salnichenko (KAZ)

=== Women's tournament ===
Team roster

- Gabrielle Stone
- Madeline Musselman
- Melissa Seidemann
- Rachel Fattal
- Paige Hauschild
- Margaret Steffens (C)
- Jordan Raney
- Kiley Neushul
- Aria Fischer
- Jamie Neushul
- Makenzie Fischer
- Alys Williams
- Amanda Longan

Group play

Pos	Team	Pld	W	D	L	GF	GA	GD	Pts	Qualification
1	United States	3	3	0	0	58	17	+41	6	Quarterfinals
2	Spain	3	2	0	1	35	17	+18	4	Playoffs
3	New Zealand	3	1	0	2	17	38	−21	2	Playoffs
4	South Africa	3	0	0	3	11	49	−38	0	

Updated to match(es) played on 20 July 2017. Source: Sportresult
Rules for classification: 1) points; 2) head-to-head points; 3) head-to-head goal difference; 4) head-to-head number of goals scored; 5) Goal difference.

16 July 2017; 13:30	Report	South Africa	2–24	United States	Alfréd Hajós National Swimming Stadium, Budapest; Referees: Diego Caribaldi (ARG), Daniel Daners (URU)
16 July 2017; 13:30	Report	Score by quarters: 0–6, 0–7, 2–5, 0–6			Alfréd Hajós National Swimming Stadium, Budapest; Referees: Diego Caribaldi (ARG), Daniel Daners (URU)
16 July 2017; 13:30	Report	Barrett, Penney 1	Goals	J. Neushul 6	Alfréd Hajós National Swimming Stadium, Budapest; Referees: Diego Caribaldi (ARG), Daniel Daners (URU)

18 July 2017; 09:30	Report	United States	12–8	Spain	Alfréd Hajós National Swimming Stadium, Budapest; Referees: Diana Dutilh-Dumas (NED), Sergey Naumov (RUS)
18 July 2017; 09:30	Report	Score by quarters: 6–1, 1–2, 2–2, 3–3			Alfréd Hajós National Swimming Stadium, Budapest; Referees: Diana Dutilh-Dumas (NED), Sergey Naumov (RUS)
18 July 2017; 09:30	Report	Musselman, J. Neushul 3	Goals	Espar 3	Alfréd Hajós National Swimming Stadium, Budapest; Referees: Diana Dutilh-Dumas (NED), Sergey Naumov (RUS)

20 July 2017; 18:50	Report	New Zealand	7–22	United States	Alfréd Hajós National Swimming Stadium, Budapest; Referees: Diego Garibaldi (ARG), Yosuke Kajiwarra (JPN)
20 July 2017; 18:50	Report	Score by quarters: 2–6, 1–6, 2–6, 2–4			Alfréd Hajós National Swimming Stadium, Budapest; Referees: Diego Garibaldi (ARG), Yosuke Kajiwarra (JPN)
20 July 2017; 18:50	Report	Pye, Stoneman 2	Goals	Steffens 5	Alfréd Hajós National Swimming Stadium, Budapest; Referees: Diego Garibaldi (ARG), Yosuke Kajiwarra (JPN)

Quarterfinals

24 July 2017; 16:10	Report	United States	7–5	Australia	Alfréd Hajós National Swimming Stadium, Budapest; Referees: Francesc Buch (ESP), Frank Ohme (GER)
24 July 2017; 16:10	Report	Score by quarters: 0–0, 3–0, 2–2, 2–3			Alfréd Hajós National Swimming Stadium, Budapest; Referees: Francesc Buch (ESP), Frank Ohme (GER)
24 July 2017; 16:10	Report	Musselman, Raney 2	Goals	Gofers 4	Alfréd Hajós National Swimming Stadium, Budapest; Referees: Francesc Buch (ESP), Frank Ohme (GER)

Semifinals

26 July 2017; 20:30	Report	Russia	9–14	United States	Alfréd Hajós National Swimming Stadium, Budapest; Referees: Adrian Alexandrescu (ROU), Vojin Putniković (SRB)
26 July 2017; 20:30	Report	Score by quarters: 4–5, 1–6, 2–2, 2–1			Alfréd Hajós National Swimming Stadium, Budapest; Referees: Adrian Alexandrescu (ROU), Vojin Putniković (SRB)
26 July 2017; 20:30	Report	Prokofyeva 3	Goals	Fattal 5	Alfréd Hajós National Swimming Stadium, Budapest; Referees: Adrian Alexandrescu (ROU), Vojin Putniković (SRB)

Final

28 July 2017; 20:30	Report	United States	13–6	Spain	Alfréd Hajós National Swimming Stadium, Budapest; Referees: Diana Dutilh-Dumas (NED), Daniel Flahive (AUS)
28 July 2017; 20:30	Report	Score by quarters: 2–1, 3–2, 5–2, 3–1			Alfréd Hajós National Swimming Stadium, Budapest; Referees: Diana Dutilh-Dumas (NED), Daniel Flahive (AUS)
28 July 2017; 20:30	Report	K. Neushul 4	Goals	Espar 3	Alfréd Hajós National Swimming Stadium, Budapest; Referees: Diana Dutilh-Dumas (NED), Daniel Flahive (AUS)
