= Swimming at the 2017 World Aquatics Championships – Men's 100 metre freestyle =

Men's 100 metre freestyle at the 2017 World Aquatics Championships
- Venue: Danube Arena
- Location: Budapest, Hungary
- Dates: 26 July (heats and semifinals); 27 July (final)
- Competitors: 113 from 106 nations
- Winning time: 47.17

Medalists
| gold medal | Caeleb Dressel | United States |
| silver medal | Nathan Adrian | United States |
| bronze medal | Mehdy Metella | France |

The Men's 100 metre freestyle competition at the 2017 World Championships was held on 26 and 27 July 2017.

== Records ==
Prior to the competition, the existing world and championship records were as follows.

| World record | César Cielo (BRA) | 46.91 | Rome, Italy | 30 July 2009 |
| Competition record | César Cielo (BRA) | 46.91 | Rome, Italy | 30 July 2009 |

== Results ==
=== Heats ===
The heats were held on 26 July at 09:45.

| Rank | Heat | Lane | Name | Nationality | Time | Notes |
|---|---|---|---|---|---|---|
| 1 | 12 | 4 | Cameron McEvoy | Australia | 47.97 | Q |
| 2 | 10 | 3 | Mehdy Metella | France | 48.18 | Q |
| 3 | 11 | 5 | Caeleb Dressel | United States | 48.26 | Q |
| 4 | 12 | 7 | Jack Cartwright | Australia | 48.43 | Q |
| 5 | 10 | 2 | Shinri Shioura | Japan | 48.46 | Q |
| 5 | 12 | 5 | Duncan Scott | Great Britain | 48.46 | Q |
| 5 | 11 | 4 | Nathan Adrian | United States | 48.46 | Q |
| 5 | 11 | 6 | Marcelo Chierighini | Brazil | 48.46 | Q |
| 9 | 12 | 2 | Yuri Kisil | Canada | 48.56 | Q |
| 9 | 10 | 7 | Danila Izotov | Russia | 48.56 | Q |
| 11 | 9 | 0 | Serhiy Shevtsov | Ukraine | 48.60 | Q |
| 12 | 12 | 6 | Gabriel Santos | Brazil | 48.64 | Q |
| 13 | 10 | 4 | Pieter Timmers | Belgium | 48.67 | Q |
| 14 | 9 | 5 | Oussama Sahnoune | Algeria | 48.75 | Q |
| 15 | 11 | 8 | Ivano Vendrame | Italy | 48.78 | Q |
| 16 | 12 | 1 | Velimir Stjepanović | Serbia | 48.80 | Q |
| 17 | 10 | 6 | Joseph Schooling | Singapore | 48.86 | |
| 18 | 10 | 0 | Dylan Carter | Trinidad and Tobago | 48.87 | |
| 18 | 11 | 9 | Richárd Bohus | Hungary | 48.87 | |
| 20 | 10 | 8 | Kristian Golomeev | Greece | 48.88 | |
| 21 | 12 | 8 | Dominik Kozma | Hungary | 48.89 | |
| 22 | 10 | 5 | Luca Dotto | Italy | 48.91 | |
| 23 | 10 | 1 | Kacper Majchrzak | Poland | 48.98 | |
| 24 | 11 | 3 | Vladimir Morozov | Russia | 48.99 | |
| 25 | 11 | 2 | Damian Wierling | Germany | 49.07 | |
| 26 | 11 | 7 | Yu Hexin | China | 49.08 | |
| 27 | 11 | 0 | Federico Grabich | Argentina | 49.09 | |
| 28 | 12 | 3 | Katsumi Nakamura | Japan | 49.10 | |
| 29 | 9 | 6 | Cristian Quintero | Venezuela | 49.19 | |
| 30 | 12 | 9 | Hanser García | Cuba | 49.33 | |
| 31 | 9 | 1 | Ben Schwietert | Netherlands | 49.41 | |
| 32 | 8 | 2 | Mohamed Samy | Egypt | 49.42 | |
| 33 | 8 | 1 | Miguel Nascimento | Portugal | 49.56 | |
| 34 | 9 | 8 | Mislav Sever | Croatia | 49.61 | |
| 35 | 8 | 9 | Markus Lie | Norway | 49.65 | NR |
| 36 | 9 | 9 | Jordan Sloan | Ireland | 49.66 | |
| 37 | 9 | 4 | Hoàng Quý Phước | Vietnam | 49.67 | |
| 38 | 9 | 7 | Anders Lie | Denmark | 49.71 | |
| 39 | 8 | 7 | Ben Hockin | Paraguay | 49.78 | |
| 40 | 8 | 4 | Ari-Pekka Liukkonen | Finland | 49.79 | |
| 41 | 7 | 4 | Adil Kaskabay | Kazakhstan | 49.81 | |
| 42 | 9 | 2 | Yauhen Tsurkin | Belarus | 49.82 | |
| 43 | 11 | 1 | Simonas Bilis | Lithuania | 49.83 | |
| 44 | 12 | 0 | Marius Radu | Romania | 49.86 | |
| 45 | 8 | 5 | Khurshidjon Tursunov | Uzbekistan | 49.91 | |
| 46 | 8 | 6 | Aleksandar Nikolov | Bulgaria | 49.99 | |
| 46 | 9 | 3 | Zane Waddell | South Africa | 49.99 | |
| 48 | 8 | 8 | Hüseyin Emre Sakçı | Turkey | 50.01 | |
| 49 | 7 | 6 | Julien Henx | Luxembourg | 50.06 | NR |
| 50 | 7 | 8 | Mikel Schreuders | Aruba | 50.12 | |
| 51 | 8 | 3 | Sam Perry | New Zealand | 50.14 | |
| 52 | 7 | 5 | Liran Konovalov | Israel | 50.16 | |
| 53 | 7 | 7 | Luís Flores | Puerto Rico | 50.31 | |
| 54 | 7 | 9 | Bradley Vincent | Mauritius | 50.38 | |
| 55 | 8 | 0 | Daniel Ramírez | Mexico | 50.54 | |
| 56 | 7 | 1 | Kregor Zirk | Estonia | 51.00 | |
| 56 | 6 | 2 | Xander Skinner | Namibia | 51.00 | |
| 58 | 7 | 2 | Wang Yu-lian | Chinese Taipei | 51.04 | |
| 59 | 6 | 3 | Peter Wetzlar | Zimbabwe | 51.08 | |
| 60 | 6 | 5 | Christian Sperandio Sánchez | Dominican Republic | 51.15 | |
| 61 | 6 | 7 | Mokhtar Al-Yamani | Yemen | 51.19 | |
| 62 | 7 | 0 | Sam Seghers | Papua New Guinea | 51.29 | |
| 63 | 6 | 4 | Enzo Martínez | Uruguay | 51.39 | |
| 64 | 6 | 6 | Kent Cheung | Hong Kong | 51.49 | |
| 65 | 6 | 0 | Jean-Luc Zephir | Saint Lucia | 51.98 | |
| 66 | 6 | 8 | Matthew Zammit | Malta | 52.09 | |
| 66 | 5 | 4 | Giorgi Biganishvili | Georgia | 52.09 | |
| 68 | 6 | 1 | Kevin Avila Soto | Guatemala | 52.18 | |
| 69 | 3 | 6 | Jagger Stephens | Guam | 52.35 | |
| 70 | 5 | 3 | Mahfizur Rahman Sagor | Bangladesh | 52.55 | |
| 71 | 6 | 9 | Mohammed Bedour | Jordan | 52.68 | |
| 72 | 5 | 5 | Noah Mascoll-Gomes | Antigua and Barbuda | 52.81 | |
| 73 | 3 | 3 | Farhan Farhan | Bahrain | 52.83 | |
| 74 | 3 | 5 | Adel El-Fakir | Libya | 53.00 | |
| 75 | 3 | 4 | Bakr Al-Dulaimi | Iraq | 53.12 | |
| 76 | 5 | 7 | Serginni Marten | Curaçao | 53.18 | |
| 77 | 5 | 6 | Souhail Hamouchane | Morocco | 53.52 | |
| 78 | 4 | 5 | Anthony Souaiby | Lebanon | 53.62 | |
| 79 | 5 | 2 | Miguel Mena | Nicaragua | 53.68 | |
| 80 | 5 | 1 | Kimani Maina | Kenya | 53.72 | |
| 81 | 7 | 3 | Triady Fauzi Sidiq | Indonesia | 54.22 | |
| 82 | 5 | 8 | Vladimir Mamikonyan | Armenia | 54.26 | |
| 83 | 5 | 9 | Heriniavo Rasolonjatovo | Madagascar | 54.70 | |
| 84 | 5 | 0 | Ado Gargović | Montenegro | 54.89 | |
| 85 | 4 | 4 | Christian Nikles | Brunei | 55.05 | |
| 86 | 3 | 0 | Dean Hoffman | Seychelles | 55.15 | |
| 87 | 1 | 4 | Hannibal Gaskin | Guyana | 55.53 | |
| 88 | 2 | 9 | Abdalla Aboughazala | Qatar | 55.67 | |
| 89 | 1 | 1 | Temaruata Strickland | Cook Islands | 55.82 | |
| 90 | 4 | 3 | Kerry Ollivierre | Grenada | 55.91 | |
| 91 | 2 | 5 | Adrian Robinson | Botswana | 56.01 | |
| 92 | 4 | 2 | Nabeel Hatoum | Palestine | 56.08 | |
| 93 | 3 | 8 | Yellow Yeiyah | Nigeria | 56.38 | |
| 94 | 2 | 8 | Boldbaataryn Buyantogtokh | Mongolia | 56.50 | |
| 95 | 2 | 6 | Theo Chiabaut | Monaco | 56.63 | |
| 96 | 2 | 6 | Adil Bharmal | Tanzania | 56.68 | |
| 97 | 4 | 7 | Kaleo Kihleng | Micronesia | 56.79 | |
| 98 | 1 | 0 | Billy-Scott Irakose | Burundi | 56.93 | |
| 99 | 2 | 2 | Mark Hoare | Swaziland | 57.38 | |
| 100 | 2 | 3 | Muhammad Khan | Pakistan | 57.53 | |
| 101 | 1 | 7 | Tongli Panuve | Tonga | 58.21 | |
| 102 | 1 | 8 | Cheng Pirort | Cambodia | 58.52 | |
| 103 | 2 | 1 | Olim Kurbanov | Tajikistan | 58.56 | |
| 104 | 3 | 2 | Joshua Tibatemwa | Uganda | 58.79 | |
| 105 | 1 | 5 | Shawn Dingilius-Wallace | Palau | 58.81 | |
| 106 | 1 | 3 | Anubhav Subba | Nepal | 59.11 | |
| 107 | 2 | 4 | Cruz Halbich | Saint Vincent and the Grenadines | 59.54 | |
| 108 | 4 | 9 | David Roberto | Northern Mariana Islands | 1:01.18 | |
| 109 | 2 | 0 | Ismail Muthasim Adnan | Maldives | 1:01.68 | |
| 110 | 4 | 8 | Jefferson Kpanou | Benin | 1:10.40 | |
| 111 | 3 | 1 | Kokou Amegashie | Togo | 1:11.13 | |
| 112 | 3 | 9 | Phillip Kinono | Marshall Islands | 1:12.94 | |
| 113 | 4 | 0 | Hamid Rahimi | Afghanistan | 1:16.81 | |
| — | 10 | 9 | Jan Świtkowski | Poland | DNS | |
| — | 1 | 2 | Abeiku Jackson | Ghana | DNS | |
| — | 1 | 6 | Momodou Saine | Gambia | DNS | |
| — | 2 | 7 | Rashed Al-Tarmoom | Suspended Member Federation | DNS | |
| — | 3 | 7 | Adama Niane | Senegal | DNS | |
| — | 4 | 1 | Oumar Kaba | Guinea | DNS | |

=== Semifinals ===
The semifinals were held on 26 July at 17:41.

==== Semifinal 1 ====
| Rank | Lane | Name | Nationality | Time | Notes |
|---|---|---|---|---|---|
| 1 | 4 | Mehdy Metella | France | 47.65 | Q |
| 2 | 5 | Jack Cartwright | Australia | 47.97 | Q |
| 3 | 6 | Duncan Scott | Great Britain | 48.10 | Q |
| 4 | 3 | Marcelo Chierighini | Brazil | 48.31 | Q |
| 5 | 1 | Oussama Sahnoune | Algeria | 48.33 | |
| 6 | 2 | Yuri Kisil | Canada | 48.50 | |
| 7 | 8 | Velimir Stjepanović | Serbia | 48.66 | |
| 8 | 7 | Gabriel Santos | Brazil | 48.72 | |

==== Semifinal 2 ====
| Rank | Lane | Name | Nationality | Time | Notes |
|---|---|---|---|---|---|
| 1 | 5 | Caeleb Dressel | United States | 47.66 | Q |
| 2 | 6 | Nathan Adrian | United States | 47.85 | Q |
| 3 | 4 | Cameron McEvoy | Australia | 47.95 | Q |
| 4 | 7 | Serhiy Shevtsov | Ukraine | 48.30 | Q, NR |
| 5 | 3 | Shinri Shioura | Japan | 48.54 | |
| 6 | 8 | Ivano Vendrame | Italy | 48.71 | |
| 7 | 2 | Danila Izotov | Russia | 48.78 | |
| 8 | 1 | Pieter Timmers | Belgium | 48.96 | |

=== Final ===
The final was held on 27 July at 17:51.

| Rank | Lane | Name | Nationality | Time | Notes |
|---|---|---|---|---|---|
| 1st place, gold medalist(s) | 5 | Caeleb Dressel | United States | 47.17 | NR |
| 2nd place, silver medalist(s) | 3 | Nathan Adrian | United States | 47.87 | |
| 3rd place, bronze medalist(s) | 4 | Mehdy Metella | France | 47.89 | |
| 4 | 6 | Cameron McEvoy | Australia | 47.92 | |
| 5 | 7 | Duncan Scott | Great Britain | 48.11 | |
| 5 | 8 | Marcelo Chierighini | Brazil | 48.11 | |
| 7 | 2 | Jack Cartwright | Australia | 48.24 | |
| 8 | 1 | Sergii Shevtsov | Ukraine | 48.26 | NR |
