= Devyn Leask =

Zimbabwean swimmer (born 1999)

Personal information
- Born: 14 September 1999 (age 26)

Sport
- Sport: Swimming

Devyn Leask (born 29 December 1999) is a Zimbabwean swimmer. She competed in the women's 200 metre freestyle event at the 2017 World Aquatics Championships.
