= Ivano Vendrame =

Italian swimmer (born 1997)

Personal information
- Nationality: Italian
- Born: 19 May 1997 (age 29)

Sport
- Sport: Swimming
- Strokes: Freestyle
Medal record
European Championships (LC)
Silver medal – second place	2018 Glasgow	4×100 m freestyle

Ivano Vendrame (born 19 May 1997) is an Italian swimmer. He competed in the men's 100 metre freestyle event at the 2017 World Aquatics Championships.
