= Ana Marcela Cunha =

Brazilian swimmer (born 1992)

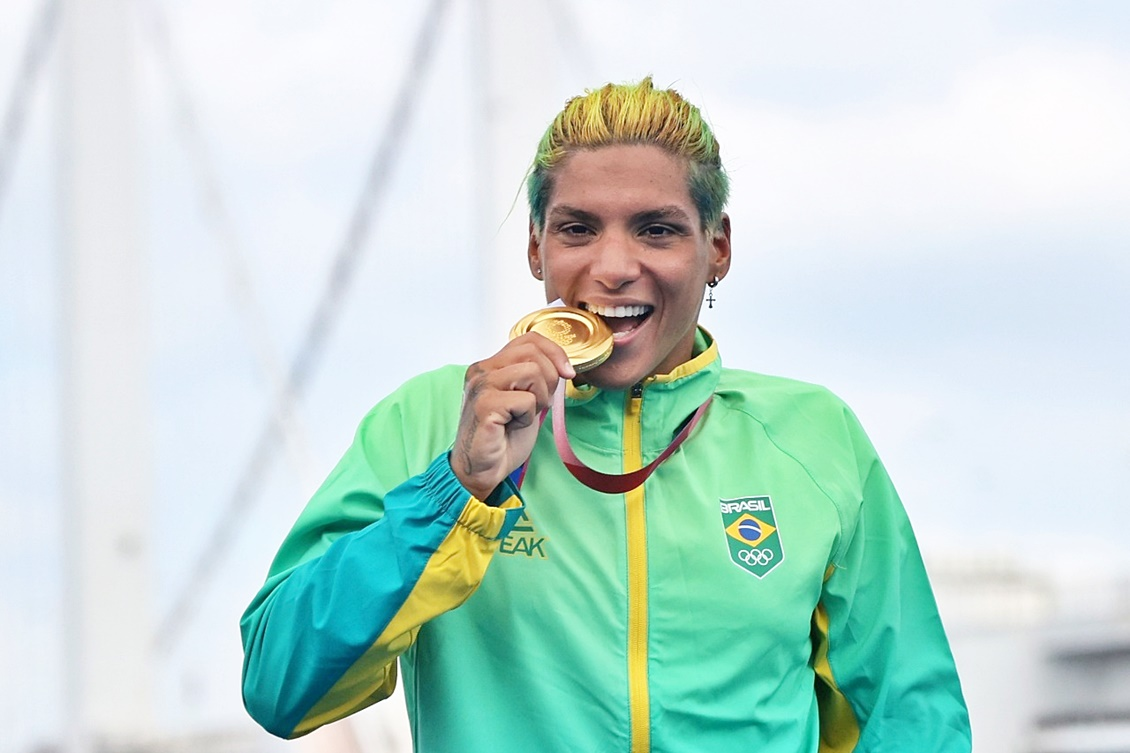
- Cunha at the 2020 Summer Olympics

Personal information
- Full name: Ana Marcela Jesus Soares da Cunha
- National team: Brazil
- Born: 23 March 1992 (age 34) Salvador, Bahia, Brazil
- Height: 1.64 m (5 ft 5 in)
- Weight: 65 kg (143 lb)

Sport
- Sport: Swimming
- Strokes: Open water marathon
- Club: Unisanta
Medal record
Women's swimming
Representing Brazil
Olympic Games
Gold medal – first place	2020 Tokyo	10 km open water
World Championships
Gold medal – first place	2011 Shanghai	25 km open water
Gold medal – first place	2015 Kazan	25 km open water
Gold medal – first place	2017 Budapest	25 km open water
Gold medal – first place	2019 Gwangju	5 km open water
Gold medal – first place	2019 Gwangju	25 km open water
Gold medal – first place	2022 Budapest	5 km open water
Gold medal – first place	2022 Budapest	25 km open water
Silver medal – second place	2013 Barcelona	10 km open water
Silver medal – second place	2015 Kazan	Team open water
Bronze medal – third place	2013 Barcelona	5 km open water
Bronze medal – third place	2015 Kazan	10 km open water
Bronze medal – third place	2017 Budapest	5 km open water
Bronze medal – third place	2017 Budapest	10 km open water
Bronze medal – third place	2022 Budapest	10 km open water
Bronze medal – third place	2023 Fukuoka	5 km open water
Bronze medal – third place	2024 Doha	5 km open water
World Open Water Championships
Bronze medal – third place	2010 Roberval	5 km open water
World Beach Games
Gold medal – first place	2019 Doha	5 km open water
Pan Pacific Championships
Bronze medal – third place	2018 Tokyo	10 km open water
Pan American Games
Gold medal – first place	2019 Lima	10 km open water
Silver medal – second place	2023 Santiago	10 km open water
South American Games
Gold medal – first place	2006 Buenos Aires	5 km open water
Gold medal – first place	2006 Buenos Aires	10 km open water
Gold medal – first place	2010 Medellín	5 km open water
Gold medal – first place	2014 Santiago	3 km team
Gold medal – first place	2022 Asunción	10 km open water
Gold medal – first place	2026 Santa Fe	10 km open water
Silver medal – second place	2010 Medellín	10 km open water
Bronze medal – third place	2014 Santiago	10 km open water

Ana Marcela Jesus Soares da Cunha (born 23 March 1992) is a Brazilian swimmer who specializes in the open water swimming marathon. She is considered one of the best open water swimmers in history, having obtained 17 medals in FINA World Aquatics Championships (including seven gold medals as of 2024). She has also received FINA’s Female World Open Water Swimmer Of The Year award six times (2010, 2014, 2015, 2017, 2018, and 2019). Her countless achievements are comparable only to those of Larisa Ilchenko, another multi-medalist in World Championships.

Cunha won the gold medal at the 2020 Summer Olympics in the women's marathon 10 km.

== Career ==
At only 14 years old, she collected two gold medals at the 5 km and 10 km marathon at the 2006 South American Games in Buenos Aires.

In 2005, she was able to reach second place in Travessia dos Fortes (the most important competition of the aquatic marathon calendar in Brazil). Subsequently, became champion in 2006 and 2011.

Cunha qualified for the 2008 Summer Olympics in Beijing, after placing tenth at the FINA World Open Water Swimming Championships in Seville, Spain. She became the youngest-ever swimmer to participate in the inaugural women's 10 km open water marathon, against a field of twenty-four other competitors, including her teammate Poliana Okimoto, South African amputee Natalie du Toit, British duo Keri-Anne Payne and Cassandra Patten, and sixteen-year-old American Chloe Sutton. Cunha finished in a close race for fifth place, with a total time of 1:59:36.8, approximately one second ahead of Switzerland's Swann Oberson, yet nine seconds behind winner Larisa Ilchenko of Russia.

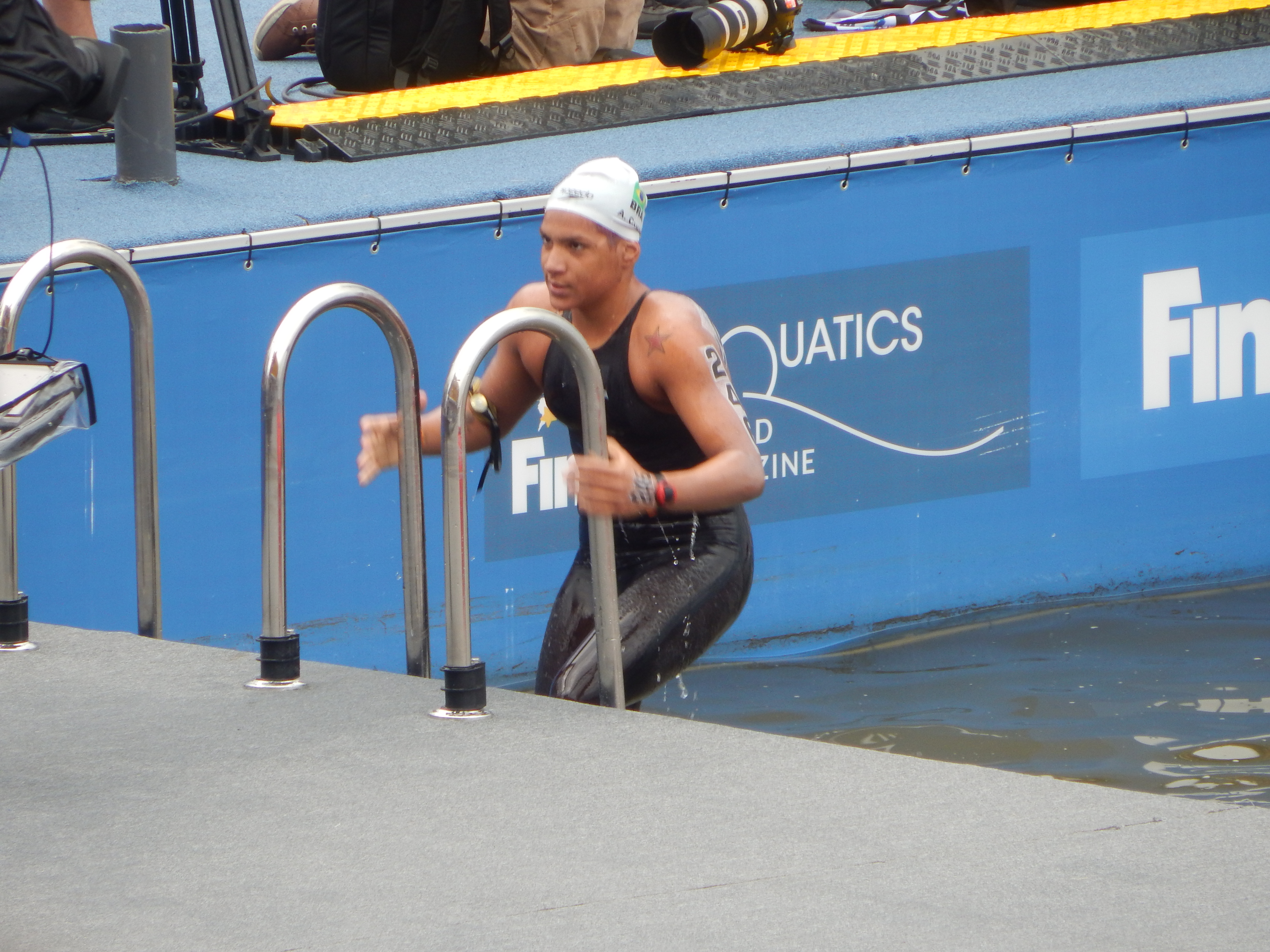
Winning race at the 2015 World Champs

At the 2009 FINA World Championships in Rome, Italy, Cunha finished twenty-second in the 10 km marathon, with a time of 2:02:06.4. The following year, she reinforced her lead in the FINA 10 km Marathon Swimming World Cup circuit, by dominating all eight meets of the series. Because of her repeated successes, Cunha was selected as FINA's best female open water swimmer of the year.

She won the gold medal at the 5 km marathon tied with Andreina Pinto, at the 2010 South American Games in Medellín. She also got the silver medal in the 10 km marathon.

At the 2011 FINA World Championships in Shanghai, Cunha won the gold medal in the women's 25 km marathon, with a time of 5:29:22.9. Despite her first world championship success, Cunha nearly missed out of the final slot for the 2012 Summer Olympics in London, as she placed eleventh in the 10 km marathon, with a slowest time of 2:02:22.2, four seconds behind Spain's Erika Villaécija García. Cunha also placed seventh in the 5 km marathon with a time of

In 2012, Cunha decided to withdraw from the FINA Olympic Marathon Swim Qualifier, held in Setubal, Portugal, to focus on her competitive career for the FINA 10 km Marathon Swimming World Cup circuit. She dominated the series by successfully defending her title for the second time, amassing a total of 160 points and four victories in eight different meets.

At the 2013 FINA World Championships in Barcelona, Spain, Cunha handed an entire medal haul for the Brazilians in the 5 km marathon, as she snatched the bronze in 56:44.4. Three days later, she won the silver medal in the 10 km marathon, with her teammate Poliana Okimoto winning the gold medal. Ending her participation, she was in the 25 km marathon, where she tried to defend her 2011 title, but finished in fifth place, 4 seconds of the race winner.

At the 2015 FINA World Championships in Kazan, Cunha won a bronze medal in the 10 km marathon. Two days later, she won the silver medal in the Mixed 5km Team Event. On 1 August, she became two-time World Champion of the 25 km marathon. At 23, Ana Marcela Cunha became the Brazilian woman with more medals won at the World Championships of Olympic sports.

Returning to the Olympic open water marathon in 2016, Cunha was deemed the race's favorite in previews, especially with the advantage of the Olympics being in her home country. However, she was unable to live up to the pressure of winning at home, finishing in tenth, while blaming the underperformance on missing the in-race nutrition.

At the 2017 FINA World Championships in Budapest, Cunha won two bronze medals in the 5 km marathon and in the 10 km marathon. On 21 July, she became three-time World Champion of the 25 km marathon. She also participated at the Mixed 5km Team Event, along with Viviane Jungblut, Allan do Carmo and Fernando Ponte, finishing 6th.

In 2019, she won the gold medal in the women's marathon 10 kilometres at the 2019 Pan American Games held in Lima, Peru. She also claimed gold at the ANOC World Beach Games in the women's open water 5 km swim.

At the 2020 Summer Olympics, in the Women's marathon 10 km, she won the gold medal.

At the 2022 World Aquatics Championships held in Budapest, Hungary, she won her second gold medal in a row in the Women's 5 km open water, with a time of 57:52.9. She also won bronze in the Women's 10 km. In the Women's 25 km event she became a five-time world champion this year, with four titles in a row.

In 2026, Cunha swam the English Channel in 8 hours 25 minutes, from England to France, finishing at 1:17pm on 22 July 2026.

== Awards and honours ==
- FINA, Top 10 Moments: 2020 Summer Olympics (#7 for winning the gold medal in the 10 kilometre open water swim by 0.7 seconds)

== Personal life ==
Ana is a lesbian. Her father was a swimmer and her mother is a former gymnast, who always supported her.
