= Open water swimming at the 2017 World Aquatics Championships =

Held in July 2017 in Hungary

- Host city: Budapest, Hungary
- Date(s): 15–21 July
- Venue(s): Lake Balaton, Hungary
- Events: 7

Open water swimming at the 2017 World Aquatics Championships was held from 15 to 21 July 2017 in Lake Balaton, Hungary.

== Schedule ==
Seven events were held.

All times are local (UTC+2).

Date	Time	Event
15 July 2017	10:00	Men's 5 km
16 July 2017	10:00	Women's 10 km
18 July 2017	10:00	Men's 10 km
19 July 2017	10:00	Women's 5 km
20 July 2017	10:00	5 km team
21 July 2017	08:30	Men's 25 km
21 July 2017	08:45	Women's 25 km

== Medal summary ==
=== Medal table ===
Rank	Nation	Gold	Silver	Bronze	Total
1	France (FRA)	4	1	1	6
2	United States (USA)	1	2	0	3
3	Netherlands (NED)	1	1	0	2
4	Brazil (BRA)	1	0	2	3
5	Italy (ITA)	0	2	3	5
6	Ecuador (ECU)	0	1	0	1
7	Great Britain (GBR)	0	0	1	1
7	Russia (RUS)	0	0	1	1
Totals (8 entries)		7	7	8	22

=== Men ===
Event	Gold		Silver		Bronze	
5 km	Marc-Antoine Olivier; France	54:31.4	Mario Sanzullo; Italy	54:32.1	Timothy Shuttleworth; Great Britain	54:42.1
10 km	Ferry Weertman; Netherlands	1:51:58.5	Jordan Wilimovsky; United States	1:51:58.6	Marc-Antoine Olivier; France	1:51:59.2
25 km	Axel Reymond; France	5:02:46.4	Matteo Furlan; Italy	5:02:47.0	Evgeny Drattsev; Russia	5:02:49.8

=== Women ===
Event	Gold		Silver		Bronze	
5 km	Ashley Twichell; United States	59:07.0	Aurélie Muller; France	59:10.5	Ana Marcela Cunha; Brazil	59:11.4
10 km	Aurélie Muller; France	2:00:13.7	Samantha Arévalo; Ecuador	2:00:17.0	Ana Marcela Cunha; Brazil Arianna Bridi; Italy	2:00:17.2
25 km	Ana Marcela Cunha; Brazil	5:21:58.4	Sharon van Rouwendaal; Netherlands	5:22:00.8	Arianna Bridi; Italy	5:22:08.2

=== Team ===
Event	Gold		Silver		Bronze	
Team	France; Oceane Cassignol; Logan Fontaine; Aurélie Muller; Marc-Antoine Olivier	54:05.9	United States; Brendan Casey; Ashley Twichell; Haley Anderson; Jordan Wilimovsky	54:18.1	Italy; Rachele Bruni; Giulia Gabbrielleschi; Federico Vanelli; Mario Sanzullo	54:31.0
