= Aurélie Muller =

French swimmer (born 1990)

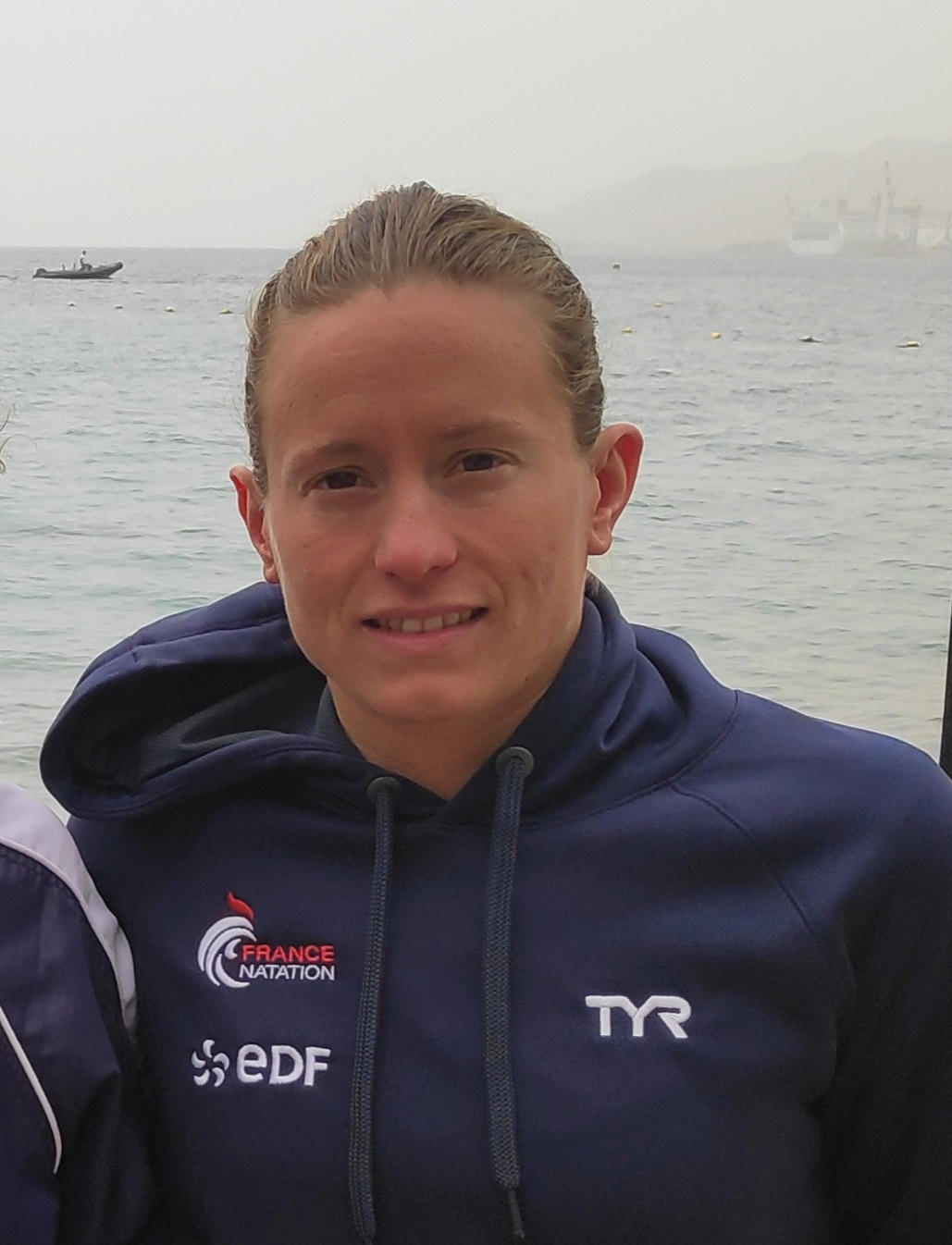
- Muller in 2019

Personal information
- National team: France
- Born: 7 June 1990 (age 36) Sarreguemines, France
- Height: 1.69 m (5 ft 7 in)
- Weight: 57 kg (126 lb)

Sport
- Sport: Swimming
- Strokes: Freestyle, open water
- Club: Cercle des nageurs narbonnais
- Coach: Philippe Lucas
Medal record
Women's swimming
Representing France
World Championships
Gold medal – first place	2015 Kazan	10 km open water
Gold medal – first place	2017 Budapest	10 km open water
Gold medal – first place	2017 Budapest	Team event
Silver medal – second place	2011 Shanghai	5 km open water
Silver medal – second place	2017 Budapest	5 km open water
Silver medal – second place	2019 Gwangju	5 km open water
Silver medal – second place	2022 Budapest	5 km open water
European Open Water Championships
Gold medal – first place	2016 Hoorn	10 km open water
Bronze medal – third place	2022 Rome	Team relay
World Junior Championships
Gold medal – first place	2006 Rio de Janeiro	1500 m freestyle
European Junior Championships
Gold medal – first place	2006 Palma	400 m freestyle

Aurélie Muller (born 7 June 1990) is a French swimmer, who specializes in long-distance freestyle events and open water marathon. She won the 10-kilometer competition at the 2015 world championship in Kazan, Russia and at the 2017 world championship in Budapest, Hungary.

== Junior career ==
In 2006, Muller claimed two freestyle titles (400 and 1500 m) under a junior division at the European Championships in Palma de Mallorca, Spain, and at the FINA World Championships in Rio de Janeiro, Brazil, with respective times of 4:15.72 and 16:35.32.

== Senior career ==
Muller qualified for the 2008 Summer Olympics in Beijing, after placing ninth from the FINA World Open Water Swimming Championships in Seville, Spain. Muller swam in the first ever women's 10 km open water marathon, against a field of 24 other competitors. Muller finished the race in twenty-first place with a total time of 2:02:04.1, approximately two minutes behind winner Larisa Ilchenko of Russia.

At the 2011 FINA World Championships in Shanghai, China, Muller edged out U.S. swimmer Ashley Twichell to clinch a silver medal by a single tenth margin (0.1) in the women's 5 km marathon with a time of 1:00:40.1.

Muller also sought to qualify for the 2012 Summer Olympics in London, but missed an A-standard cut (8:33.84) in the 800 m freestyle from the national trials in Dunkirk by nearly twelve seconds, clocking at 8:45.55.

In 2015, after a switch from Sarreguemines to the Narbonne Swim Club, she becomes world champion in the 10-kilometer competition, the only olympic event, in Kazan and qualifies for the Rio 2016 Olympics.

Muller was voted 2015 European Open water swimmer of the year by European swimming federation LEN.

In the Rio 2016 Olympic 10 km race she finished in second place, but was disqualified for grappling and obstructing Italian Rachele Bruni on the finish line, handing the bronze medal to a Brazilian swimmer, competing at home.
