= China at the 2017 World Aquatics Championships =

- Flag of China
- FINA code: CHN
- National federation: Chinese Swimming Association
- Website: swimming.org.cn

in Budapest, Hungary
- Competitors: 93 in 5 sports
- Medals Ranked 2nd: Gold 12 Silver 12 Bronze 6 Total 30

World Aquatics Championships appearances
- 1973; 1975; 1978; 1982; 1986; 1991; 1994; 1998; 2001; 2003; 2005; 2007; 2009; 2011; 2013; 2015; 2017; 2019; 2022; 2023; 2024

China is scheduled to compete at the 2017 World Aquatics Championships in Budapest, Hungary from 14 July to 30 July.

== Medalists ==
Medal	Name	Sport	Event	Date
Gold	Ren Qian; Lian Junjie	Diving	Mixed 10 metre synchronized platform	July 15
Gold	Peng Jianfeng	Diving	Men's 1 metre springboard	July 16
Gold	Ren Qian; Si Yajie	Diving	Women's 10 metre synchronized platform	July 16
Gold	Chang Yani; Shi Tingmao	Diving	Women's 3 metre synchronized springboard	July 17
Gold	Chen Aisen; Yang Hao	Diving	Men's 10 metre synchronized platform	July 17
Gold	Xie Siyi	Diving	Men's 3 metre springboard	July 20
Gold	Shi Tingmao	Diving	Women's 3 metre springboard	July 21
Gold	Chang Hao; Feng Yu; Guo Li; Jiang Tingting (R); Jiang Wenwen (R); Liang Xinping; Tang Mengni; Wang Liuyi; Wang Qianyi; Xiao Yanning; Yin Chengxin; Yu Lele	Synchronized swimming	Women's free routine combination	July 22
Gold	Wang Han; Li Zheng	Diving	Mixed 3 metre synchronized springboard	July 22
Gold	Sun Yang	Swimming	Men's 400 metre freestyle	July 23
Gold	Sun Yang	Swimming	Men's 200 metre freestyle	July 25
Gold	Xu Jiayu	Swimming	Men's 100 metre backstroke	July 25
Silver	Cao Yuan; Xie Siyi	Diving	Men's 3 metre synchronized springboard	July 15
Silver	He Chao	Diving	Men's 1 metre springboard	July 16
Silver	Jiang Tingting; Jiang Wenwen; Feng Yu (R)	Synchronized swimming	Women's duet technical routine	July 16
Silver	Chang Hao (R); Feng Yu; Guo Li; Liang Xinping; Tang Mengni; Wang Liuyi; Wang Qianyi; Xiao Yanning; Yin Chengxin; Yu Lele (R)	Synchronized swimming	Women's team technical routine	July 18
Silver	Si Yajie	Diving	Women's 10 metre platform	July 19
Silver	Jiang Tingting; Jiang Wenwen; Feng Yu (R)	Synchronized swimming	Women's duet free routine	July 20
Silver	Chang Hao; Feng Yu; Guo Li; Liang Xinping; Tang Mengni; Wang Liuyi (R); Wang Qianyi (R); Xiao Yanning; Yin Chengxin; Yu Lele	Synchronized swimming	Women's team free routine	July 21
Silver	Wang Han	Diving	Women's 3 metre springboard	July 21
Silver	Chen Aisen	Diving	Men's 10 metre platform	July 22
Silver	Fu Yuanhui	Swimming	Women's 50 metre backstroke	July 27
Silver	Ai Yanhan; Li Bingjie; Liu Zixuan; Shen Duo*; Wang Jingzhuo*; Zhang Yuhan	Swimming	Women's 4 × 200 metre freestyle relay	July 27
Silver	Li Bingjie	Swimming	Women's 800 metre freestyle	July 29
Bronze	Ren Qian	Diving	Women's 10 metre platform	July 19
Bronze	Yang Jian	Diving	Men's 10 metre platform	July 22
Bronze	Li Bingjie	Swimming	Women's 400 metre freestyle	July 23
Bronze	Li Guangyuan*; Li Zhuhao*; Xu Jiayu; Yan Zibei; Shi Jinglin*; Zhang Yufei; Zhu Menghui	Swimming	4 × 100 metre mixed medley relay	July 26
Bronze	Wang Shun	Swimming	Men's 200 metre freestyle	July 27
Bronze	Shi Jinglin	Swimming	Women's 200 metre breaststroke	July 28

Legend: (R) = Reserve Athlete

== Diving ==
China has entered 16 divers (ten male and six female).

Men

Athlete	Event	Preliminaries		Semifinals		Final	
Athlete	Event	Points	Rank	Points	Rank	Points	Rank
He Chao	1 m springboard	431.35	2 Q	—		447.20	2nd place, silver medalist(s)
Peng Jianfeng	1 m springboard	435.15	1 Q	—		448.40	1st place, gold medalist(s)
Cao Yuan	3 m springboard	452.65	4 Q	517.45	1 Q	453.70	10
Xie Siyi	3 m springboard	512.90	1 Q	476.50	4 Q	547.10	1st place, gold medalist(s)
Chen Aisen	10 m platform	553.50	1 Q	488.55	3 Q	585.25	2nd place, silver medalist(s)
Yang Jian	10 m platform	521.65	2 Q	441.75	11 Q	565.15	3rd place, bronze medalist(s)
Cao Yuan; Xie Siyi	3 m synchronized springboard	438.84	1 Q	—		323.28	2nd place, silver medalist(s)
Chen Aisen; Yang Hao	10 m synchronized platform	466.44	1 Q	—		498.48	1st place, gold medalist(s)

Women

Athlete	Event	Preliminaries		Semifinals		Final	
Athlete	Event	Points	Rank	Points	Rank	Points	Rank
Chang Yani	1 m springboard	243.30	14	—		Did not advance	
Chen Yiwen	1 m springboard	277.20	2 Q	—		294.70	4
Shi Tingmao	3 m springboard	353.30	1 Q	380.45	1 Q	383.50	1st place, gold medalist(s)
Wang Han	3 m springboard	344.35	2 Q	354.90	2 Q	359.40	2nd place, silver medalist(s)
Ren Qian	10 m platform	376.65	1 Q	367.50	2 Q	391.95	3rd place, bronze medalist(s)
Si Yajie	10 m platform	359.25	3 Q	382.80	1 Q	396.00	2nd place, silver medalist(s)
Chang Yani; Shi Tingmao	3 m synchronized springboard	320.40	1 Q	—		333.30	1st place, gold medalist(s)
Ren Qian; Si Yajie	10 m synchronized platform	334.32	1 Q	—		352.56	1st place, gold medalist(s)

Mixed

Athlete	Event	Final	
Athlete	Event	Points	Rank
Wang Han; Li Zheng	3 m synchronized springboard	323.70	1st place, gold medalist(s)
Ren Qian; Lian Junjie	10 m synchronized platform	352.98	1st place, gold medalist(s)
Chen Yiwen; Qiu Bo	Team	355.15	6

== Open water swimming ==
China has entered eight open water swimmers

Athlete	Event	Time	Rank
Liu Shuyi	Men's 5 km	1:00:06.0	52
Zhang Zibin	Men's 5 km	56:33.0	44
An Jiabao	Men's 10 km	1:54:27.5	35
Zu Lijun	Men's 10 km	1:52:38.1	=25
Lei Shan	Women's 5 km	1:00:57.1	17
Qu Fang	Women's 5 km	1:02:02.8	34
Xin Xin	Women's 10 km	2:01:59.8	17
Yan Siyu	Women's 10 km	2:01:06.1	12

== Swimming ==
Chinese swimmers have achieved qualifying standards in the following events (up to a maximum of 2 swimmers in each event at the A-standard entry time, and 1 at the B-standard):

Men

Athlete	Event	Heat		Semifinal		Final	
Athlete	Event	Time	Rank	Time	Rank	Time	Rank
Ji Xinjie	1500 m freestyle	15:23.91	25	—		did not advance	
Li Guangyuan	100 m backstroke	54.04	10 Q	53.84	=9	did not advance	
Li Guangyuan	200 m backstroke	1:57.66	9 Q	1:57.10	10	did not advance	
Li Xiang	100 m breaststroke	59.97	17	did not advance			
Li Zhuhao	50 m butterfly	23.86	21	did not advance			
Li Zhuhao	100 m butterfly	51.62	11 Q	51.29	7 Q	50.96	6
Li Zhuhao	200 m butterfly	1:58.63	21	did not advance			
Mao Feilian	200 m breaststroke	2:10.01	9 Q	2:09.63	12	did not advance	
Qin Haiyang	200 m breaststroke	2:09.39 WJ	4 Q	2:10.14	15	did not advance	
Qin Haiyang	200 m individual medley	1:59.01 WJ	8 Q	1:57.81 WJ	8 Q	1:57.06 WJ	6
Qiu Ziao	400 m freestyle	3:51.94	25	—		did not advance	
Qiu Ziao	800 m freestyle	7:57.47	17	—		did not advance	
Shi Yang	50 m butterfly	23.91	22	did not advance			
Shi Yang	50 m freestyle	22.68	34	did not advance			
Sun Yang	200 m freestyle	1:45.78	1 Q	1:45.24	3 Q	1:44.39 AS	1st place, gold medalist(s)
Sun Yang	400 m freestyle	3:44.55	2 Q	—		3:41.38	1st place, gold medalist(s)
Sun Yang	800 m freestyle	7:49.28	5 Q	—		7:48.87	5
Sun Yang	1500 m freestyle	DNS		—		Did not advance	
Wang Shun	200 m freestyle	1:49.89	42	did not advance			
Wang Shun	200 m individual medley	1:59.56	11 Q	1:57.39	7 Q	1:56.28	3rd place, bronze medalist(s)
Wang Shun	400 m individual medley	4:20.01	19	—		did not advance	
Wang Zhou	200 m butterfly	1:58.88	22	did not advance			
Wang Zhou	400 m individual medley	4:28.25	31	—		did not advance	
Xu Jiayu	50 m backstroke	24.78	=3 Q	24.67	4 Q	24.74	5
Xu Jiayu	100 m backstroke	52.77	1 Q	52.44	1 Q	52.44	1st place, gold medalist(s)
Xu Jiayu	200 m backstroke	1:56.92	5 Q	1:54.79	1 Q	1:55.26	5
Yan Zibei	50 m breaststroke	27.25 NR	12 Q	27.33	15	did not advance	
Yan Zibei	100 m breaststroke	59.61	9 Q	59.15	5 Q	59.42	7
Yu Hexin	50 m freestyle	22.41	24	did not advance			
Yu Hexin	100 m freestyle	49.08	26	did not advance			
Cao Jiwen; Lin Yongqing; Ma Tianchi; Yu Hexin	4 × 100 m freestyle relay	3:17.69	13	—		did not advance	
Ji Xinjie; Ma Tianchi; Qian Zhiyong; Wang Shun	4 × 200 m freestyle relay	7:15.62	11	—		did not advance	
Li Guangyuan*; Li Zhuhao; Sun Yang*; Xu Jiayu; Yan Zibei; Yu Hexin	4 × 100 m medley relay	3:33.50	7 Q	—		3:31.65	6

Women

Athlete	Event	Heat		Semifinal		Final	
Athlete	Event	Time	Rank	Time	Rank	Time	Rank
Ai Yanhan	100 m freestyle	54.54	18	did not advance			
Ai Yanhan	200 m freestyle	1:58.04	13 Q	1:56.80	10	did not advance	
Chen Jie	100 m backstroke	59.88	8 Q	59.85	9	did not advance	
Chen Jie	200 m backstroke	2:11.88	18	did not advance			
Chen Yejie	1500 m freestyle	16:53.74	16	—		did not advance	
Fu Yuanhui	50 m backstroke	27.21	1 Q	27.19	2 Q	27.15	2nd place, silver medalist(s)
Fu Yuanhui	100 m backstroke	1:00.52	=14 Q	1:00.39	13	did not advance	
Hou Yawen	1500 m freestyle	16:05.87	3 Q	—		16:08.10	5
Li Bingjie	200 m freestyle	1:57.79	12 Q	1:57.11	11	Did not advance	
Li Bingjie	400 m freestyle	4:04.94	4 Q	—		4:03.25	3rd place, bronze medalist(s)
Li Bingjie	800 m freestyle	8:22.92	3 Q	—		8:15.46 AS	2nd place, silver medalist(s)
Liu Xiang	50 m freestyle	24.78	=9 Q	24.56	7 Q	24.58	6
Liu Yaxin	200 m backstroke	2:10.59	14 Q	2:09.02	12	did not advance	
Lu Ying	50 m butterfly	26.34	16 Q	25.79	11	did not advance	
Lu Ying	100 m butterfly	58.51	14 Q	58.45	14	did not advance	
Shi Jinglin	100 m breaststroke	1:06.94	7 Q	1:06.47	3 Q	1:06.43	5
Shi Jinglin	200 m breaststroke	2:25.39	10 Q	2:23.17	4 Q	2:21.93	3rd place, bronze medalist(s)
Suo Ran	50 m breaststroke	31.22	16 Q	31.14	15	did not advance	
Wang Xueer	50 m backstroke	27.85	6 Q	27.60	8 Q	27.55	6
Ye Shiwen	200 m individual medley	2:12.48	14 Q	2:13.01	15	did not advance	
Ye Shiwen	400 m individual medley	4:43.40	15	—		did not advance	
Zhang Sishi	200 m individual medley	2:13.99	22	Did not advance			
Zhang Xinyu	100 m breaststroke	1:08.81	=26	Did not advance			
Zhang Yufei	50 m butterfly	26.40	17	Did not advance			
Zhang Yufei	100 m butterfly	57.54	6 Q	57.29	7 Q	57.51	8
Zhang Yufei	200 m butterfly	2:07.50	2 Q	2:07.11	5 Q	2:07.06	5
Zhang Yuhan	400 m freestyle	4:06.21	6 Q	—		4:06.03	7
Zhang Yuhan	800 m freestyle	8:29.52	7 Q	—		8:26.06	6
Zhou Min	400 m individual medley	4:42.26	13	—		did not advance	
Zhou Yilin	200 m butterfly	2:07.72	4 Q	2:06.63	2 Q	2:07.67	8
Zhu Menghui	50 m freestyle	24.65	7 Q	24.68	12	Did not advance	
Zhu Menghui	100 m freestyle	54.00	=10 Q	53.85	11	Did not advance	
Ai Yanhan; Wu Yue; Zhang Yufei; Zhu Menghui	4 × 100 m freestyle relay	3:37.02	6 Q	—		3:36.49	6
Ai Yanhan; Li Bingjie; Liu Zixuan; Shen Duo*; Wang Jingzhuo*; Zhang Yuhan	4 × 200 m freestyle relay	7:51.75	1 Q	—		7:44.96	2nd place, silver medalist(s)
Fu Yuanhui; Shi Jinglin; Zhang Yufei; Zhu Menghui	4 × 100 m medley relay	3:57.12	2 Q	—		3:57.69	6

Mixed

Athlete	Event	Heat		Final	
Athlete	Event	Time	Rank	Time	Rank
Cao Jiwen; Lin Yongqing; Wu Qingfeng; Sun Meichen	4 × 100 m freestyle relay	3:29.42	9	Did not advance	
Li Guangyuan*; Li Zhuhao*; Xu Jiayu; Yan Zibei; Shi Jinglin*; Zhang Yufei; Zhu Menghui	4 × 100 m medley relay	3:46.25	6 Q	3:41.25 AS	3rd place, bronze medalist(s)

== Synchronized swimming ==
China's synchronized swimming team consisted of 14 athletes (1 male and 13 female).

Women

Athlete	Event	Preliminaries		Final	
Athlete	Event	Points	Rank	Points	Rank
Jiang Tingting; Jiang Wenwen; Feng Yu (R)	Duet technical routine	92.9033	2 Q	94.0775	2nd place, silver medalist(s)
Jiang Tingting; Jiang Wenwen; Feng Yu (R)	Duet free routine	94.9333	2 Q	95.3000	2nd place, silver medalist(s)
Chang Hao (R); Feng Yu; Guo Li; Liang Xinping; Tang Mengni; Wang Liuyi; Wang Qianyi; Xiao Yanning; Yin Chengxin; Yu Lele (R)	Team technical routine	93.0711	2 Q	94.2165	2nd place, silver medalist(s)
Chang Hao; Feng Yu; Guo Li; Liang Xinping; Tang Mengni; Wang Liuyi (R); Wang Qianyi (R); Xiao Yanning; Yin Chengxin; Yu Lele	Team free routine	94.3667	2 Q	95.2333	2nd place, silver medalist(s)
Chang Hao; Feng Yu; Guo Li; Jiang Tingting (R); Jiang Wenwen (R); Liang Xinping; Tang Mengni; Wang Liuyi; Wang Qianyi; Xiao Yanning; Yin Chengxin; Yu Lele	Free routine combination	95.5333	1 Q	96.1000	1st place, gold medalist(s)

Mixed

Athlete	Event	Preliminaries		Final	
Athlete	Event	Points	Rank	Points	Rank
Sheng Shuwen; Shi Haoyu	Duet free routine	76.5333	8 Q	77.2333	8

Legend: (R) = Reserve Athlete

== Water polo ==
China qualified a women's team.

=== Women's tournament ===
Team roster

- Peng Lin
- Bi Yanan
- Mei Xiaohan
- Xiong Dunhan
- Niu Guannan
- Guo Ning
- Nong Sanfeng
- Zhang Cong
- Zhao Zihan (C)
- Zhang Danyi
- Chen Xiao
- Zhang Jing
- Shen Yineng

Group play

Pos	Team	Pld	W	D	L	GF	GA	GD	Pts	Qualification
1	Italy	3	3	0	0	43	16	+27	6	Quarterfinals
2	Canada	3	2	0	1	29	24	+5	4	Playoffs
3	China	3	1	0	2	27	28	−1	2	Playoffs
4	Brazil	3	0	0	3	14	45	−31	0	

Source: Sportresult
Rules for classification: 1) points; 2) head-to-head points; 3) head-to-head goal difference; 4) head-to-head number of goals scored; 5) Goal difference.

16 July 2017; 10:50	Report	Brazil	4–11	China	Alfréd Hajós National Swimming Stadium, Budapest; Referees: Daniel Flahive (AUS), Frank Ohme (GER)
16 July 2017; 10:50	Report	Score by quarters: 2–4, 0–2, 2–1, 0–4			Alfréd Hajós National Swimming Stadium, Budapest; Referees: Daniel Flahive (AUS), Frank Ohme (GER)
16 July 2017; 10:50	Report	four players 1	Goals	Zhang C. 3	Alfréd Hajós National Swimming Stadium, Budapest; Referees: Daniel Flahive (AUS), Frank Ohme (GER)

18 July 2017; 18:50	Report	China	8–9	Canada	Alfréd Hajós National Swimming Stadium, Budapest; Referees: Adrian Alexandrescu (ROU), Vojin Putniković (SRB)
18 July 2017; 18:50	Report	Score by quarters: 1–1, 4–2, 0–5, 3–1			Alfréd Hajós National Swimming Stadium, Budapest; Referees: Adrian Alexandrescu (ROU), Vojin Putniković (SRB)
18 July 2017; 18:50	Report	Xiong, Zhang J. 2	Goals	four players 2	Alfréd Hajós National Swimming Stadium, Budapest; Referees: Adrian Alexandrescu (ROU), Vojin Putniković (SRB)

20 July 2017; 13:30	Report	Italy	15–8	China	Alfréd Hajós National Swimming Stadium, Budapest; Referees: Sergey Naumov (RUS), Georgios Stavridis (GRE)
20 July 2017; 13:30	Report	Score by quarters: 3–2, 4–2, 6–0, 2–4			Alfréd Hajós National Swimming Stadium, Budapest; Referees: Sergey Naumov (RUS), Georgios Stavridis (GRE)
20 July 2017; 13:30	Report	Aiello, Palmieri 3	Goals	Chen 3	Alfréd Hajós National Swimming Stadium, Budapest; Referees: Sergey Naumov (RUS), Georgios Stavridis (GRE)

Playoffs

22 July 2017; 19:00	Report	China	5–13	Spain	Alfréd Hajós National Swimming Stadium, Budapest; Referees: Diana Dutilh-Dumas (NED), Steven Rotsart (USA)
22 July 2017; 19:00	Report	Score by quarters: 2–1, 1–4, 1–5, 1–3			Alfréd Hajós National Swimming Stadium, Budapest; Referees: Diana Dutilh-Dumas (NED), Steven Rotsart (USA)
22 July 2017; 19:00	Report	Zhao 2	Goals	B. Ortiz 4	Alfréd Hajós National Swimming Stadium, Budapest; Referees: Diana Dutilh-Dumas (NED), Steven Rotsart (USA)

9th–12th place semifinals

24 July 2017; 13:30	Report	China	13–5	France	Alfréd Hajós National Swimming Stadium, Budapest; Referees: Natacha Florestano (BRA), Nader Ghafouri (IRI)
24 July 2017; 13:30	Report	Score by quarters: 3–2, 3–2, 4–1, 3–0			Alfréd Hajós National Swimming Stadium, Budapest; Referees: Natacha Florestano (BRA), Nader Ghafouri (IRI)
24 July 2017; 13:30	Report	Niu 3	Goals	Sacre 2	Alfréd Hajós National Swimming Stadium, Budapest; Referees: Natacha Florestano (BRA), Nader Ghafouri (IRI)

Ninth place game

26 July 2017; 12:00	Report	Netherlands	14–7	China	Alfréd Hajós National Swimming Stadium, Budapest; Referees: Natacha Florestano (BRA), Dion Willis (RSA)
26 July 2017; 12:00	Report	Score by quarters: 2–2, 5–2, 2–1, 5–2			Alfréd Hajós National Swimming Stadium, Budapest; Referees: Natacha Florestano (BRA), Dion Willis (RSA)
26 July 2017; 12:00	Report	Nijhuis 4	Goals	three players 2	Alfréd Hajós National Swimming Stadium, Budapest; Referees: Natacha Florestano (BRA), Dion Willis (RSA)
