= Open water swimming at the 2017 World Aquatics Championships – Men's 10 km =

Men's 10 km at the 2017 World Aquatics Championships
- Venue: Lake Balaton
- Location: Hungary
- Dates: 18 July
- Competitors: 65 from 38 nations
- Winning time: 1:51:58.5

Medalists
gold medal	Ferry Weertman	Netherlands
silver medal	Jordan Wilimovsky	United States
bronze medal	Marc-Antoine Olivier	France

The Men's 10 km competition at the 2017 World Championships was held on 18 July 2017.

== Results ==
The final was started at 10:00.

Rank	Swimmer	Nationality	Time
1st place, gold medalist(s)	Ferry Weertman	Netherlands	1:51:58.5
2nd place, silver medalist(s)	Jordan Wilimovsky	United States	1:51:58.6
3rd place, bronze medalist(s)	Marc-Antoine Olivier	France	1:51:59.2
4	Jack Burnell	Great Britain	1:52:00.8
5	Kristóf Rasovszky	Hungary	1:52:01.7
6	David Aubry	France	1:52:01.9
7	Simone Ruffini	Italy	1:52:07.7
8	Evgeny Drattsev	Russia	1:52:10.1
9	Brendan Casey	United States	1:52:18.6
10	Federico Vanelli	Italy	1:52:21.0
11	Krzysztof Pielowski	Poland	1:52:24.5
12	Christian Reichert	Germany	1:52:29.3
13	Chad Ho	South Africa	1:52:29.9
14	Ventsislav Aydarski	Bulgaria	1:52:30.2
15	Vitaliy Khudyakov	Kazakhstan	1:52:30.8
16	Shahar Resman	Israel	1:52:32.6
17	Jack Brazier	Australia	1:52:32.8
18	Marcel Schouten	Netherlands	1:52:33.1
19	Kirill Abrosimov	Russia	1:52:35.5
19	Fernando Ponte	Brazil	1:52:35.5
21	Dániel Székelyi	Hungary	1:52:35.7
22	Guillermo Bertola	Argentina	1:52:35.9
23	Richard Weinberger	Canada	1:52:36.0
24	Caleb Hughes	Great Britain	1:52:37.0
25	Zu Lijun	China	1:52:38.1
25	Rob Muffels	Germany	1:52:38.1
27	Joaquín Moreno	Argentina	1:52:39.9
28	Philippe Guertin	Canada	1:52:40.6
29	Allan do Carmo	Brazil	1:52:40.7
30	Ivan Enderica Ochoa	Ecuador	1:52:57.7
31	Johndry Segovia	Venezuela	1:53:39.6
32	David Brandl	Austria	1:54:24.3
33	Matěj Kozubek	Czech Republic	1:54:24.6
34	Ihor Chervynskyy	Ukraine	1:54:27.2
35	An Jiabao	China	1:54:27.5
36	Tamás Farkas	Serbia	1:54:34.0
37	Juan Segovia	Venezuela	1:54:37.0
38	Asterios Daldogiannis	Greece	1:54:39.1
39	Georgios Arniakos	Greece	1:54:52.3
40	Yasunari Hirai	Japan	1:54:52.9
41	David Castro	Ecuador	1:54:56.4
42	Marwan El-Amrawy	Egypt	1:55:01.5
43	Ihor Snitko	Ukraine	1:55:06.0
44	Taiki Nonaka	Japan	1:55:14.1
45	Nico Manoussakis	South Africa	1:56:30.0
46	Vít Ingeduld	Czech Republic	1:57:59.8
47	Fernando Betanzos	Mexico	1:58:16.0
48	Shai Toledano	Israel	1:58:23.3
49	Evgenij Pop Acev	North Macedonia	1:59:55.6
50	Haythem Abdelkhalek	Tunisia	1:59:58.2
51	Bence Balzam	Serbia	2:00:01.4
52	Arturo Pérez Vertti	Mexico	2:00:53.4
53	Rodrigo Caballero	Bolivia	2:01:59.1
54	Pedro Pinotes	Angola	2:03:26.5
55	Keith Sin	Hong Kong	2:04:38.1
56	Kenessary Kenenbayev	Kazakhstan	2:05:14.0
57	Peter Gutyan	Slovakia	2:06:07.0
58	Marek Pavuk	Slovakia	2:07:14.9
59	Frank Ojarand	Estonia	2:08:03.0
60	Youssef Hossameldeen	Egypt	2:09:25.3
61	Tse Tsz Fung	Hong Kong	2:09:32.4
62	Zedheir Torrez	Bolivia	2:10:34.1
63	Emilio Avila	Guatemala	2:12:56.8
64	Omkumar Tokalkandiga	India	2:13:52.1
65	Cristofer Lanuza	Costa Rica	2:15:41.2
