= David Dinsmore (diver) =

American diver (born 1997)

Personal information
- Full name: David Allen Dinsmore
- Born: 25 May 1997 (age 29) New Albany, Ohio, U.S.

Sport
- Country: United States
- Event(s): 10m platform, 10m synchro platform
Medal record
Men's diving
Representing United States
World Championships
Bronze medal – third place	2017 Budapest	Team event
Summer Universiade
Silver medal – second place	2017 Taipei	10 m platform

David Allen Dinsmore (born May 25, 1997, in New Albany, Ohio) is an American diver. Dinsmore is now studying at the University of Miami, and dives under coach Randy Ableman. In March 2017, Dinsmore won the NCAA Division I title on the men's platform event with a score of 528.20. He placed 3rd at the 2016 Olympic Diving Trials, behind Steele Johnson and David Boudia respectively.

In 2017, Dinsmore and his partner Krysta Palmer won a bronze medal in the team event at the World Aquatics Championships with a total of 395.90 points.
