= Swimming at the 2017 World Aquatics Championships – Women's 1500 metre freestyle =

Women's 1500 metre freestyle at the 2017 World Aquatics Championships
- Venue: Danube Arena
- Location: Budapest, Hungary
- Dates: 24 July (heats); 25 July (final)
- Competitors: 22 from 18 nations
- Winning time: 15:31.82

Medalists
gold medal	Katie Ledecky	United States
silver medal	Mireia Belmonte	Spain
bronze medal	Simona Quadarella	Italy

The Women's 1500 metre freestyle competition at the 2017 World Championships was held on 24 and 25 July 2017.

== Records ==
Prior to the competition, the existing world and championship records were as follows.

World record	Katie Ledecky (USA)	15:25.48	Kazan, Russia	4 August 2015
Competition record	Katie Ledecky (USA)	15:25.48	Kazan, Russia	4 August 2015

== Results ==
=== Heats ===
The heats were held on 24 July at 10:48.

Rank	Heat	Lane	Name	Nationality	Time	Notes
1	3	4	Katie Ledecky	United States	15:47.54	Q
2	3	5	Mireia Belmonte	Spain	16:05.37	Q
3	2	6	Hou Yawen	China	16:05.87	Q
4	2	5	Simona Quadarella	Italy	16:07.08	Q
5	2	4	Boglárka Kapás	Hungary	16:09.60	Q
6	3	6	Kristel Köbrich	Chile	16:17.28	Q
7	3	1	Julia Hassler	Liechtenstein	16:19.16	Q, NR
8	2	3	Ajna Késely	Hungary	16:20.98	Q
9	3	2	Jimena Pérez	Spain	16:21.45	
10	3	7	Tamila Holub	Portugal	16:24.05	
11	3	8	Emma Robinson	New Zealand	16:25.78	
12	2	7	Celine Rieder	Germany	16:25.99	
13	2	1	Gaja Natlačen	Slovenia	16:32.45	
14	2	8	Olivia Anderson	Canada	16:34.50	
15	3	3	Tjaša Oder	Slovenia	16:34.86	
16	2	2	Chen Yejie	China	16:53.74	
17	2	0	María Bramont-Arias	Peru	17:01.85	
18	3	0	Martina Elhenická	Czech Republic	17:04.63	
19	1	3	Alicia Mancilla	Guatemala	17:15.04	
20	1	5	Ho Nam Wai	Hong Kong	17:17.64	
21	1	4	Samantha Randle	South Africa	17:22.42	
22	3	9	Souad Cherouati	Algeria	17:25.00	

=== Final ===
The final was held on 25 July at 17:40.

Rank	Lane	Name	Nationality	Time	Notes
1st place, gold medalist(s)	4	Katie Ledecky	United States	15:31.82	
2nd place, silver medalist(s)	5	Mireia Belmonte	Spain	15:50.89	NR
3rd place, bronze medalist(s)	6	Simona Quadarella	Italy	15:53.86	
4	2	Boglárka Kapás	Hungary	16:06.27	
5	3	Hou Yawen	China	16:08.10	
6	7	Kristel Köbrich	Chile	16:13.46	
7	1	Julia Hassler	Liechtenstein	16:14.86	NR
8	8	Ajna Késely	Hungary	16:22.87	
