= Ecuador at the 2017 World Aquatics Championships =

- Flag of Ecuador
- World Aquatics code: ECU
- National federation: Federación Ecuatoriana de Natación
- Website: www.fena-ecuador.org

in Budapest, Hungary
- Competitors: 8 in 2 sports
- Medals Ranked 22nd: Gold 0 Silver 1 Bronze 0 Total 1

World Aquatics Championships appearances
- 1973; 1975; 1978; 1982; 1986; 1991; 1994; 1998; 2001; 2003; 2005; 2007; 2009; 2011; 2013; 2015; 2017; 2019; 2022; 2023; 2024; 2025

Ecuador is scheduled to compete at the 2017 World Aquatics Championships in Budapest, Hungary from 14 July to 30 July.

== Medalists ==
Medal	Name	Sport	Event	Date
Silver	Samantha Arévalo	Open water swimming	Women's 10 km	July 16

== Open water swimming ==
Ecuador has entered seven open water swimmers

Athlete	Event	Time	Rank
David Castro	Men's 10 km	1:54:56.4	41
Iván Enderica Ochoa	Men's 5 km	55:11.0	24
Iván Enderica Ochoa	Men's 10 km	1:52:57.7	30
David Farinango	Men's 5 km	54:59.0	16
Santiago Enderica	Men's 25 km	5:08:54.8	14
Samantha Arévalo	Women's 5 km	1:00:52.9	15
Samantha Arévalo	Women's 10 km	2:00:17.0	2nd place, silver medalist(s)
Nataly Caldas	Women's 10 km	2:04:50.1	29
Nataly Caldas	Women's 25 km	5:39:31.5	16
Patricia Guerrero	Women's 5 km	1:08:13.2	51
Samantha Arévalo; Nataly Caldas; David Castro; Ivan Enderica Ochoa	Mixed team	58:01.2	14

== Swimming ==
Ecuadorian swimmers have achieved qualifying standards in the following events (up to a maximum of 2 swimmers in each event at the A-standard entry time, and 1 at the B-standard):

Athlete	Event	Heat		Semifinal		Final	
Athlete	Event	Time	Rank	Time	Rank	Time	Rank
Tomas Peribonio	Men's 200 m individual medley	2:01.21	20	did not advance			
Tomas Peribonio	Men's 400 m individual medley	4:17.37	12	—N/a		did not advance	
