= Argentina at the 2017 World Aquatics Championships =

- Flag of Argentina
- World Aquatics code: ARG
- National federation: Confederación Argentina de Deportes Acuáticos
- Website: www.cadda.org.ar

in Budapest, Hungary
- Competitors: 13 in 3 sports
- Medals: Gold 0 Silver 0 Bronze 0 Total 0

World Aquatics Championships appearances
- 1973; 1975; 1978; 1982; 1986; 1991; 1994; 1998; 2001; 2003; 2005; 2007; 2009; 2011; 2013; 2015; 2017; 2019; 2022; 2023; 2024; 2025

Argentina competed at the 2017 World Aquatics Championships in Budapest, Hungary from 14 to 30 July.

== Open water swimming ==
Argentina entered five open water swimmers

Athlete	Event	Time	Rank
Guillermo Bertola	Men's 10 km	1:52:35.9	22
Guillermo Bertola	Men's 25 km	5:13:46.9	20
Joaquin Moreno	Men's 10 km	1:52:39.9	27
Mayte Puca	Women's 5 km	1:03:41.0	40
Julia Arino	Women's 10 km	2:07:20.0	34
Cecilia Biagioli	Women's 10 km	2:02:23.6	21
Julia Arino; Cecilia Biagioli; Guillermo Bertola; Joaquin Moreno	Mixed team	56:43.4	13

== Swimming ==
Argentine swimmers achieved qualifying standards in the following events (up to a maximum of 2 swimmers in each event at the A-standard entry time, and 1 at the B-standard):

Men

Athlete	Event	Heat		Semifinal		Final	
Athlete	Event	Time	Rank	Time	Rank	Time	Rank
Federico Grabich	50 m freestyle	22.68	=34	Did not advance			
Federico Grabich	100 m freestyle	49.09	27	Did not advance			
Federico Grabich	200 m freestyle	1:47.89	26	Did not advance			
Santiago Grassi	50 m butterfly	23.99	26	Did not advance			
Santiago Grassi	100 m butterfly	52.59	25	Did not advance			
Martín Naidich	400 m freestyle	3:55.42	35	—N/a		Did not advance	
Martín Naidich	800 m freestyle	8:12.00	26	—N/a		Did not advance	
Martín Naidich	1500 m freestyle	DNS		—N/a		Did not advance	

Women

Athlete	Event	Heat		Semifinal		Final	
Athlete	Event	Time	Rank	Time	Rank	Time	Rank
Virginia Bardach	200 m butterfly	2:15.15	31	Did not advance			
Virginia Bardach	200 m individual medley	2:19.29	31	Did not advance			
Virginia Bardach	400 m individual medley	4:53.22	24	—N/a		Did not advance	
Andrea Berrino	50 m freestyle	25.61	=28	Did not advance			
Andrea Berrino	50 m backstroke	27.96 NR	=10 Q	27.80 NR	12	Did not advance	
Andrea Berrino	100 m backstroke	1:01.63	25	Did not advance			
Macarena Ceballos	50 m breaststroke	31.65	21	Did not advance			
Macarena Ceballos	100 m breaststroke	1:08.34	23	Did not advance			
Macarena Ceballos	200 m breaststroke	2:29.34	21	Did not advance			

Mixed

Athlete	Event	Heat		Final	
Athlete	Event	Time	Rank	Time	Rank
Federico Grabich; Santiago Grassi; Andrea Berrino; Macarena Ceballos	4×100 m medley relay	3:52.49	9	Did not advance	

== Synchronized swimming ==
Argentina's synchronized swimming team consisted of 2 athletes (2 female).

Women

Athlete	Event	Preliminaries		Final	
Athlete	Event	Points	Rank	Points	Rank
Camila Arregui	Solo technical routine	73.7771	19	Did not advance	
Camila Arregui; Trinidad López	Duet technical routine	73.8927	30	Did not advance	
Camila Arregui; Trinidad López	Duet free routine	76.7000	24	Did not advance	
