= Open water swimming at the 2017 World Aquatics Championships – Men's 5 km =

Men's 5 km at the 2017 World Aquatics Championships
- Venue: Lake Balaton
- Location: Hungary
- Dates: 15 July
- Competitors: 62 from 38 nations
- Winning time: 54:31.4

Medalists
gold medal	Marc-Antoine Olivier	France
silver medal	Mario Sanzullo	Italy
bronze medal	Timothy Shuttleworth	Great Britain

The Men's 5 km competition at the 2017 World Championships was held on 15 July 2017.

== Results ==
The race was started at 10:00.

Rank	Swimmer	Nationality	Time
1st place, gold medalist(s)	Marc-Antoine Olivier	France	54:31.4
2nd place, silver medalist(s)	Mario Sanzullo	Italy	54:32.1
3rd place, bronze medalist(s)	Timothy Shuttleworth	Great Britain	54:42.1
4	Kirill Abrosimov	Russia	54:45.9
5	Fernando Ponte	Brazil	54:47.1
6	Andrea Manzi	Italy	54:47.6
7	Kristóf Rasovszky	Hungary	54:47.6
8	Logan Fontaine	France	54:47.9
9	Vitaliy Khudyakov	Kazakhstan	54:48.1
10	David Heron	United States	54:48.2
11	Chad Ho	South Africa	54:48.6
12	Krzysztof Pielowski	Poland	54:52.0
13	Logan Vanhuys	Belgium	54:54.3
14	Eric Hedlin	Canada	54:56.9
15	Antonio Arroyo	Spain	54:57.1
16	Tobias Robinson	Great Britain	54:59.0
17	Andrew Gemmell	United States	54:59.3
18	Marwan El-Amrawy	Egypt	54:59.4
19	David Farinango	Ecuador	54:59.5
20	Ventsislav Aydarski	Bulgaria	55:00.5
21	Johndry Segovia	Venezuela	55:01.0
22	Danie Marais	South Africa	55:04.1
23	Jack McLoughlin	Australia	55:05.8
24	Iván Enderica Ochoa	Ecuador	55:11.0
25	Matan Roditi	Israel	55:13.2
26	Marcus Herwig	Germany	55:13.7
27	Ihor Chervynskyy	Ukraine	55:13.9
28	Ruwen Straub	Germany	55:14.4
29	Georgios Arniakos	Greece	55:15.0
30	Tamás Farkas	Serbia	55:17.8
31	Márk Papp	Hungary	55:28.1
32	Kirill Belyaev	Russia	55:29.9
33	Yasunari Hirai	Japan	55:33.3
34	Yohsuke Miyamoto	Japan	55:38.0
35	Idan Mordel	Israel	55:39.1
36	Matěj Kozubek	Czech Republic	55:40.1
37	Asterios Daldogiannis	Greece	55:40.7
38	David Brandl	Austria	55:42.2
39	Ihor Snitko	Ukraine	55:46.3
40	Victor Colonese	Brazil	55:46.7
41	Vít Ingeduld	Czech Republic	55:54.8
42	Phillip Seidler	Namibia	56:32.7
43	Juan Segovia	Venezuela	56:32.8
44	Zhang Zibin	China	56:33.0
45	Haythem Abdelkhalek	Tunisia	56:53.9
46	Fernando Betanzos	Mexico	57:04.2
47	Pedro Pinotes	Angola	57:22.8
48	Rodrigo Caballero	Bolivia	57:33.5
49	Adel Ragab	Egypt	57:57.3
50	Alfredo Villa	Mexico	59:14.5
51	Keith Sin	Hong Kong	59:15.9
52	Liu Shuyi	China	1:00:06.0
53	Bence Balzam	Serbia	1:00:11.2
54	Peter Gutyan	Slovakia	1:00:24.5
55	Frank Ojarand	Estonia	1:00:45.2
56	Emilio Avila	Guatemala	1:01:28.8
57	Lev Cherepanov	Kazakhstan	1:02:30.8
58	Zedheir Torrez	Bolivia	1:02:36.8
59	Amadou N'Diaye	Senegal	1:03:31.1
60	Tse Tsz Fung	Hong Kong	1:05:59.0
61	Cristofer Lanuza	Costa Rica	1:06:01.6
—	Jorn Diekmann	Namibia	OTL
