= Argentina at the 2015 World Aquatics Championships =

- Flag of Argentina
- World Aquatics code: ARG
- National federation: Confederación Argentina de Deportes Acuáticos
- Website: www.cadda.org.ar

in Kazan, Russia
- Competitors: 25 in 4 sports
- Medals Ranked 28th: Gold 0 Silver 0 Bronze 1 Total 1

World Aquatics Championships appearances
- 1973; 1975; 1978; 1982; 1986; 1991; 1994; 1998; 2001; 2003; 2005; 2007; 2009; 2011; 2013; 2015; 2017; 2019; 2022; 2023; 2024; 2025

Argentina competed at the 2015 World Aquatics Championships in Kazan, Russia from 24 July to 9 August.

== Medalists ==
Medal	Name	Sport	Event	Date
Bronze	Federico Grabich	Swimming	Men's 100 m freestyle	6 August

== Open water swimming ==
Argentina fielded a full team of four swimmers to compete in the open water marathon.

Athlete	Event	Time	Rank
Guillermo Bertola	Men's 10 km	1:51:33.6	31
Guillermo Bertola	Men's 25 km	did not finish	
Gabriel Villagoiz	Men's 10 km	1:53:00.6	40
Gabriel Villagoiz	Men's 25 km	did not finish	
Julia Arino	Women's 5 km	did not start	
Julia Arino	Women's 10 km	2:00:31.2	32
Julia Arino	Women's 25 km	did not finish	
Cecilia Biagioli	Women's 10 km	1:58:55.7	17
Guillermo Bertola; Cecilia Biagioli; Gabriel Villagoiz	Mixed team	57:27.8	13

== Swimming ==
Argentine swimmers achieved qualifying standards in the following events (up to a maximum of 2 swimmers in each event at the A-standard entry time, and 1 at the B-standard):

Men

Athlete	Event	Heat		Semifinal		Final	
Athlete	Event	Time	Rank	Time	Rank	Time	Rank
Santiago Grassi	50 m butterfly	24.03	26	did not advance			
Santiago Grassi	100 m butterfly	52.36	18	did not advance			
Federico Grabich	100 m freestyle	48.48	4 Q	48.20	3 Q	48.12	3rd place, bronze medalist(s)
Federico Grabich	200 m freestyle	1:47.73	16 Q	1:47.43 NR	12	did not advance	
Federico Grabich	50 m backstroke	25.60	27	did not advance			
Martín Naidich	400 m freestyle	3:52.43	38	—N/a		did not advance	
Martín Naidich	800 m freestyle	7:57.72	21	—N/a		did not advance	
Martín Naidich	1500 m freestyle	15:14.38	18	—N/a		did not advance	

Women

Athlete	Event	Heat		Semifinal		Final	
Athlete	Event	Time	Rank	Time	Rank	Time	Rank
Virginia Bardach	200 m butterfly	2:13.76	27	did not advance			
Virginia Bardach	200 m individual medley	2:17.24	31	did not advance			
Virginia Bardach	400 m individual medley	4:51.59	28	—N/a		did not advance	
Andrea Berrino	100 m backstroke	1:02.37	38	did not advance			
Andrea Berrino	200 m backstroke	2:14.96	28	did not advance			
Julia Sebastián	50 m breaststroke	32.13	35	did not advance			
Julia Sebastián	100 m breaststroke	1:09.71	35	did not advance			
Julia Sebastián	200 m breaststroke	2:29.28	=26	did not advance			

== Synchronized swimming ==
Argentina qualified two synchronized swimmers to compete in each of the following events.

Athlete	Event	Preliminaries		Final	
Athlete	Event	Points	Rank	Points	Rank
Etel Sánchez	Solo technical routine	78.2419	16	did not advance	
Etel Sánchez	Solo free routine	79.7000	15	did not advance	
Etel Sánchez; Sofía Sánchez	Duet technical routine	79.8065	18	did not advance	
Etel Sánchez; Sofía Sánchez	Duet free routine	79.9667	17	did not advance	

== Water polo ==
=== Men's tournament ===
Team roster

- Diego Malnero
- Ramiro Veich
- Tomás Galimberti
- Andrés Monutti
- Emanuel López
- Tomás Bulgheroni
- Juan Pablo Montané
- Esteban Corsi
- Iván Carabantes
- Julián Daszczyk
- Franco Demarchi
- Germán Yañez
- Franco Testa

Group play

Pos	Team	Pld	W	D	L	GF	GA	GD	Pts	Qualification
1	Hungary	3	3	0	0	52	13	+39	6	Advanced to quarterfinals
2	Kazakhstan	3	2	0	1	34	24	+10	4	Advanced to playoffs
3	South Africa	3	1	0	2	17	37	−20	2	Advanced to playoffs
4	Argentina	3	0	0	3	17	46	−29	0	

Source: SportResult.com
Rules for classification: 1) points; 2) head-to-head points; 3) head-to-head goal difference; 4) head-to-head number of goals scored; 5) goal difference.

27 July 2015; 13:30	Report	South Africa	10–6	Argentina	Kazan; Attendance: 913; Referees: Masoud Rezvani (IRI), Sergey Naumov (RUS)
27 July 2015; 13:30	Report	Score by quarters: 6–2, 1–2, 1–1, 2–1			Kazan; Attendance: 913; Referees: Masoud Rezvani (IRI), Sergey Naumov (RUS)
27 July 2015; 13:30	Report	E. Le Roux, P. Le Roux 3	Goals	Yañez 3	Kazan; Attendance: 913; Referees: Masoud Rezvani (IRI), Sergey Naumov (RUS)

29 July 2015; 10:50	Report	Kazakhstan	15–7	Argentina	Kazan; Attendance: 1,016; Referees: Nenad Peris (CRO), Hatem Gaber (EGY)
29 July 2015; 10:50	Report	Score by quarters: 5–2, 3–3, 5–1, 2–1			Kazan; Attendance: 1,016; Referees: Nenad Peris (CRO), Hatem Gaber (EGY)
29 July 2015; 10:50	Report	Axenov, Pekovich 4	Goals	Yañez 3	Kazan; Attendance: 1,016; Referees: Nenad Peris (CRO), Hatem Gaber (EGY)

31 July 2015; 10:50	Report	Hungary	21–4	Argentina	Kazan; Attendance: 1,065; Referees: Sergey Naumov (RUS), Peter de Jong (NED)
31 July 2015; 10:50	Report	Score by quarters: 6–2, 3–1, 6–1, 6–0			Kazan; Attendance: 1,065; Referees: Sergey Naumov (RUS), Peter de Jong (NED)
31 July 2015; 10:50	Report	Dén. Varga 5	Goals	López 2	Kazan; Attendance: 1,065; Referees: Sergey Naumov (RUS), Peter de Jong (NED)

13th–16th place semifinals

2 August 2015; 12:10	Report	Argentina	6–14	Japan	Kazan; Attendance: 218; Referees: Viktor Salnichenko (KAZ), Hatem Gaber (EGY)
2 August 2015; 12:10	Report	Score by quarters: 0–4, 2–2, 2–4, 2–4			Kazan; Attendance: 218; Referees: Viktor Salnichenko (KAZ), Hatem Gaber (EGY)
2 August 2015; 12:10	Report	Carabantes, Demarchi 3	Goals	Takei 4	Kazan; Attendance: 218; Referees: Viktor Salnichenko (KAZ), Hatem Gaber (EGY)

15th place game

4 August 2015; 09:30	Report	China	16–9	Argentina	Kazan; Attendance: 753; Referees: Joseph Peila (USA), Tadao Tahara (JPN)
4 August 2015; 09:30	Report	Score by quarters: 6–2, 3–4, 4–2, 3–1			Kazan; Attendance: 753; Referees: Joseph Peila (USA), Tadao Tahara (JPN)
4 August 2015; 09:30	Report	Dong Tao 4	Goals	Yañez 5	Kazan; Attendance: 753; Referees: Joseph Peila (USA), Tadao Tahara (JPN)
