= Argentina at the 2025 World Aquatics Championships =

- Flag of Argentina
- World Aquatics code: ARG

in Singapore
- Competitors: 23 in 4 sports
- Medals: Gold 0 Silver 0 Bronze 0 Total 0

World Aquatics Championships appearances
- 1973; 1975; 1978; 1982; 1986; 1991; 1994; 1998; 2001; 2003; 2005; 2007; 2009; 2011; 2013; 2015; 2017; 2019; 2022; 2023; 2024; 2025

Argentina are competing at the 2025 World Aquatics Championships in Singapore from July 11 to August 3, 2025.

== Athletes by discipline ==
The following is the number of competitors who will participate at the Championships per discipline.

Sport	Men	Women	Total
Artistic swimming	0	2	2
Open water swimming	1	1	2
Swimming	2	3	5
Water polo	0	14	14
Total	3	20	23

== Artistic swimming ==
Women

Athlete	Event	Preliminaries		Final	
Athlete	Event	Points	Rank	Points	Rank
Tiziana Bonucci	Solo technical routine	183.0400	31	Did not advance	
Tiziana Bonucci; Maria Carasatorre	Duet technical routine	210.2050	31	Did not advance	
Tiziana Bonucci; Maria Carasatorre	Duet free routine	168.5584	30	Did not advance	

== Open water swimming ==
Men

Athlete	Event	Heats		Semifinal		Final	
Athlete	Event	Time	Rank	Time	Rank	Time	Rank
Joaquín Moreno	3 km knockout sprints	17:13.1	11	Did not advance			
Joaquín Moreno	10 km	—N/a				2:08:27.5	32

Women

Athlete	Event	Heats		Semifinal		Final	
Athlete	Event	Time	Rank	Time	Rank	Time	Rank
Candela Giordanino	3 km knockout sprints	18:30.3	16	Did not advance			
Candela Giordanino	5 km	—N/a				1:06:32.3	30
Candela Giordanino	10 km	—N/a				2:20:15.9	27

== Swimming ==
Men

Athlete	Event	Heat		Semi-final		Final	
Athlete	Event	Time	Rank	Time	Rank	Time	Rank
Ulises Saravia	50 m backstroke	24.72	8 Q	24.68	11	Did not advance	
Ulises Saravia	100 m backstroke	53.74	15 Q	54.32	16	Did not advance	
Ulises Cazau	50 m butterfly	23.88	37	Did not advance			
Ulises Cazau	100 m butterfly	52.60	32	Did not advance			

Women

Athlete	Event	Heat		Semi-final		Final	
Athlete	Event	Time	Rank	Time	Rank	Time	Rank
Andrea Berrino	50 m freestyle	25.81	39	Did not advance			
Andrea Berrino	50 m backstroke	29.05	30	Did not advance			
Andrea Berrino	100 m backstroke	1:03.29	35	Did not advance			
Delfina Dini	400 m freestyle	4:16.81	22	—N/a		Did not advance	
Delfina Dini	800 m freestyle	8:58.17	29	—N/a		Did not advance	
Delfina Dini	1500 m freestyle	16:48.03	22	—N/a		Did not advance	
Macarena Ceballos	50 m breaststroke	30.65	12 Q	30.56	12	Did not advance	
Macarena Ceballos	100 m breaststroke	1:06.99	17	Did not advance			
Macarena Ceballos	200 m breaststroke	2:26.82	16 Q	2:28.30	15	Did not advance	

Mixed

Athlete	Event	Heat		Final	
Athlete	Event	Time	Rank	Time	Rank
Ulises Saravia; Macarena Ceballos; Ulises Cazau; Andrea Berrino	4 × 100 m medley relay	3:51.36	17	Did not advance	

== Water polo ==
Summary

Team	Event	Group stage				Playoff	13th–16th Semifinal	11th place match	
Team	Event	Opposition Score	Opposition Score	Opposition Score	Rank	Opposition Score	Opposition Score	Opposition Score	Rank
Argentina women's team	Women's tournament	Netherlands; L 6–25	China; L 9–29	United States; L 3–26	4 Q	—N/a	Singapore; W 18–9	Croatia; L 14–16	14

=== Women's tournament ===
Argentina's women's water polo team qualified by finishing in the top two at the 2024 Pan American Water Polo Championship in Ibagué, Colombia.

Team roster

The following is Argentinian roster.

Head coach: Guillermo Setti / Fabio Lombardo

- 1 Nahir Stegmayer GK
- 2 Maitena Romano FP
- 3 Bianca Perasso FP
- 4 Isabella Mastronardi FP
- 5 Manuela Tamagnone Werbach FP
- 6 Maylen Sampedro FP
- 7 Julieta Auliel FP
- 8 Carla Comba FP
- 9 María Canda FP
- 10 Ana Agnesina FP
- 11 Anahi Bacigalupo FP
- 12 Isabel Riley FP
- 13 Lola Canales GK
- 14 Agustina Todoroff FP

Group play

Pos	Team	Pld	W	PSW	PSL	L	GF	GA	GD	Pts	Qualification
1	United States	3	3	0	0	0	52	19	+33	9	Quarterfinals
2	Netherlands	3	2	0	0	1	47	24	+23	6	Playoffs
3	China	3	1	0	0	2	43	37	+6	3	Playoffs
4	Argentina	3	0	0	0	3	18	80	−62	0	13–16th place semifinals

Source: Omegatiming
Rules for classification: 1) points; 2) head-to-head points; 3) head-to-head goal difference; 4) head-to-head number of goals scored; 5) Goal difference.

11 July 2025; 10:35	Report	Argentina	6–25	Netherlands	OCBC Aquatic Centre, Singapore; Referees: Maxim Gerasimov (GBR), Georgios Stavridis (GRE)
11 July 2025; 10:35	Report	Score by quarters: 1–6, 2–6, 2–7, 1–6			OCBC Aquatic Centre, Singapore; Referees: Maxim Gerasimov (GBR), Georgios Stavridis (GRE)
11 July 2025; 10:35	Report	Canda, Mastronardi 2	Goals	four players 3	OCBC Aquatic Centre, Singapore; Referees: Maxim Gerasimov (GBR), Georgios Stavridis (GRE)

13 July 2025; 09:00	Report	China	29–9	Argentina	OCBC Aquatic Centre, Singapore; Referees: Marcella Braga (BRA), Andrej Franulović (CRO)
13 July 2025; 09:00	Report	Score by quarters: 9–4, 6–1, 6–1, 8–3			OCBC Aquatic Centre, Singapore; Referees: Marcella Braga (BRA), Andrej Franulović (CRO)
13 July 2025; 09:00	Report	three players 4	Goals	three players 2	OCBC Aquatic Centre, Singapore; Referees: Marcella Braga (BRA), Andrej Franulović (CRO)

15 July 2025; 09:00	Report	Argentina	3–26	United States	OCBC Aquatic Centre, Singapore; Referees: Dasch Barber (RSA), Stanko Ivanovski (MNE)
15 July 2025; 09:00	Report	Score by quarters: 1–6, 1–7, 1–8, 0–5			OCBC Aquatic Centre, Singapore; Referees: Dasch Barber (RSA), Stanko Ivanovski (MNE)
15 July 2025; 09:00	Report	three players 1	Goals	Stryker 6	OCBC Aquatic Centre, Singapore; Referees: Dasch Barber (RSA), Stanko Ivanovski (MNE)

13th–16th place semifinals

17 July 2025; 09:00	Report	Singapore	9–18	Argentina	OCBC Aquatic Centre, Singapore; Referees: Megan Perry (NZL), Michiel Zwart (NED)
17 July 2025; 09:00	Report	Score by quarters: 2–4, 1–6, 3–4, 3–4			OCBC Aquatic Centre, Singapore; Referees: Megan Perry (NZL), Michiel Zwart (NED)
17 July 2025; 09:00	Report	Koh 3	Goals	Canda 5	OCBC Aquatic Centre, Singapore; Referees: Megan Perry (NZL), Michiel Zwart (NED)

13th place match

19 July 2025; 10:35	Report	Argentina	14–16 (PSO)	Croatia	OCBC Aquatic Centre, Singapore; Referees: Dasch Barber (RSA), Ivan Raković (SRB)
19 July 2025; 10:35	Report	Score by quarters: 2–3, 2–2, 4–5, 4–2 PSO: 2–4			OCBC Aquatic Centre, Singapore; Referees: Dasch Barber (RSA), Ivan Raković (SRB)
19 July 2025; 10:35	Report	Bacigalupo 4	Goals	Rožić 3	OCBC Aquatic Centre, Singapore; Referees: Dasch Barber (RSA), Ivan Raković (SRB)
