= Krysta Palmer =

American diver

Personal information
- Born: June 13, 1992 (age 34) Carson City, Nevada, U.S.

Sport
- Country: United States
- Sport: Diving
- Events: 3 m, 3 m synchro
- College team: University of Nevada, Reno
- Coached by: Jian Li You
Medal record
Event	1st	2nd	3rd
Olympic Games	0	0	1
World Championships	0	0	1
Pan American Games	0	0	1
Total	0	0	3
Olympic Games
Bronze medal – third place	2020 Tokyo	3m Springboard
World Championships
Bronze medal – third place	2017 Budapest	Team event
Pan American Games
Bronze medal – third place	2023 Santiago	3 m springboard

Krysta Palmer (born June 13, 1992) is a diver from the United States.

== College career ==
Palmer competed for the University of Nevada, Reno where she was named the school's top female student-athlete in 2015–16.

== International career ==
Palmer qualified for the 2020 Olympics in both the women's synchronized 3 meter springboard with a partner Alison Gibson and then women's individual 3 meter springboard, both due to the high degree of difficulty of their dives. She won bronze in women's individual 3 meter springboard at the 2020 Olympics for the USA's first individual medal in the 3-meter event since Kelly McCormick in 1988 in Seoul in any event since Laura Wilkinson's gold in 2000.

== Personal life ==
Palmer is the daughter of Mitch and Vicki Palmer. She has one sibling named Devin. Palmer is a Christian.
