= Alison Gibson =

American diver (born 1999)

Personal information
- Full name: Alison Amaris Gibson
- Born: July 9, 1999 (age 27) Houston, Texas, U.S.
- Height: 5 ft 2 in (1.57 m)

Sport
- Country: USA
- Sport: Diving
- College team: University of Texas

Alison Amaris Gibson (born July 9, 1999 in Houston, Texas) is a diver from the United States.

== College career ==
In 2017, Gibson was an NCAA diving champion.

== International career ==
Gibson qualified for the 2020 Olympics in the women's synchronized 3 metre springboard with partner Krysta Palmer by virtue of winning the U.S. Olympic Trials in part to their high degree of difficulty in their dives.
