= Diving at the 2017 World Aquatics Championships – Men's synchronized 3 metre springboard =

Men's synchronized 3 metre springboard at the 2017 World Aquatics Championships
- Venue: Danube Arena
- Location: Budapest, Hungary
- Dates: 15 July
- Competitors: 42 from 21 nations
- Teams: 21
- Winning points: 450.30

Medalists
gold medal	Evgeny Kuznetsov; Ilya Zakharov	Russia
silver medal	Cao Yuan; Xie Siyi	China
bronze medal	Oleh Kolodiy; Illya Kvasha	Ukraine

The Men's synchronized 3 metre springboard competition at the 2017 World Championships was held on 15 July 2017.

== Results ==
The preliminary round was started at 10:00. The final was held at 18:30.

Green denotes finalists

Rank	Nation	Divers	Preliminary		Final	
Rank	Nation	Divers	Points	Rank	Points	Rank
1st place, gold medalist(s)	Russia	Evgeny Kuznetsov; Ilya Zakharov	436.86	2	450.30	1
2nd place, silver medalist(s)	China	Cao Yuan; Xie Siyi	438.84	1	443.40	2
3rd place, bronze medalist(s)	Ukraine	Oleh Kolodiy; Illya Kvasha	398.91	6	429.99	3
4	Great Britain	Jack Laugher; Chris Mears	401.88	5	418.20	4
5	Germany	Stephan Feck; Patrick Hausding	397.65	7	415.35	5
6	United States	Sam Dorman; Michael Hixon	410.10	3	409.05	6
7	Mexico	Rodrigo Diego; Adan Zúñiga	383.88	10	397.17	7
8	South Korea	Kim Yeong-nam; Woo Ha-ram	378.75	8	396.90	8
9	Canada	Philippe Gagné; François Imbeau-Dulac	404.43	4	390.06	9
10	Malaysia	Chew Yiwei; Ooi Tze Liang	384.69	9	370.77	10
11	Italy	Gabriele Auber; Lorenzo Marsaglia	374.40	12	368.64	11
12	Australia	Matthew Carter; Kevin Chávez	377.91	11	357.33	12
13	Spain	Nicolás García; Héctor García	372.30	13	did not advance	
14	Switzerland	Guillaume Dutoit; Simon Rieckhoff	369.45	14	did not advance	
15	Poland	Kacper Lesiak; Andrzej Rzeszutek	351.93	15	did not advance	
16	Belarus	Yauheni Karaliou; Mikita Tkachou	341.01	16	did not advance	
17	Singapore	Mark Lee; Timothy Lee	335.52	17	did not advance	
18	Colombia	Alejandro Arias; Sebastián Morales	326.79	18	did not advance	
19	Georgia	Sandro Melikidze; Tornike Onikashvili	316.14	19	did not advance	
20	Chile	Diego Carquin; Donato Neglia	295.23	20	did not advance	
21	Macau	Lei Wai Shing; Leong Kam Cheong	274.17	21	did not advance	
