= Diving at the 2017 World Aquatics Championships – Team event =

Team event at the 2017 World Aquatics Championships
- Venue: Danube Arena
- Location: Budapest, Hungary
- Dates: 18 July
- Competitors: 38 from 19 nations
- Teams: 19
- Winning points: 406.40

Medalists
gold medal	Laura Marino; Matthieu Rosset	France
silver medal	Viviana del Angel; Rommel Pacheco	Mexico
bronze medal	Krysta Palmer; David Dinsmore	United States

The Team event competition at the 2017 World Championships was held on 18 July 2017.

== Results ==
The final was started at 18:30.

Rank	Nation	Divers	Points
1st place, gold medalist(s)	France	Laura Marino; Matthieu Rosset	406.40
2nd place, silver medalist(s)	Mexico	Viviana del Angel; Rommel Pacheco	402.35
3rd place, bronze medalist(s)	United States	Krysta Palmer; David Dinsmore	395.90
4	Germany	Maria Kurjo; Patrick Hausding	379.55
5	Malaysia	Ahmad Azman; Leong Mun Yee	356.75
6	China	Chen Yiwen; Qiu Bo	355.15
7	Colombia	Carolina Murillo; Sebastián Villa	354.90
8	Venezuela	María Betancourt; Jesús Liranzo	349.75
9	Italy	Giovanni Tocci; Noemi Batki	342.90
10	North Korea	Kim Un-hyang; Ri Hyon-ju	341.20
11	Russia	Yulia Timoshinina; Evgeny Kuznetsov	335.60
12	Australia	Melissa Wu; Matthew Carter	325.35
13	Great Britain	Robyn Birch; Daniel Goodfellow	303.15
14	Singapore	Lim Shen-Yan Freida; Jonathan Chan	302.85
15	Netherlands	Joey van Etten; Celine van Duijn	299.40
16	Belarus	Alena Khamulkina; Vadim Kaptur	290.50
17	Egypt	Mohab Mohymen; Maha Abdelsalam	284.20
18	Ukraine	Anastasiia Nedobiha; Oleksandr Gorshkovozov	284.20
19	Romania	Anca Serb; Aurelian Dragomir	250.60
