= Argentina at the 2022 World Aquatics Championships =

- Flag of Argentina
- World Aquatics code: ARG
- National federation: Argentinian Confederation of Water Sports

in Budapest, Hungary
- Competitors: 23 in 4 sports
- Medals: Gold 0 Silver 0 Bronze 0 Total 0

World Aquatics Championships appearances
- 1973; 1975; 1978; 1982; 1986; 1991; 1994; 1998; 2001; 2003; 2005; 2007; 2009; 2011; 2013; 2015; 2017; 2019; 2022; 2023; 2024; 2025

Argentina competed at the 2022 World Aquatics Championships in Budapest, Hungary from 18 June to 3 July.

== Artistic swimming ==
Women

Athlete	Event	Preliminaries		Final	
Athlete	Event	Points	Rank	Points	Rank
Luisina Caussi; Camila Pineda	Duet technical routine	72.2259	23	did not advance	
Luisina Caussi; Camila Pineda	Duet free routine	74.0667	24	did not advance	

== Open water swimming ==
Athlete	Event	Time	Rank
Franco Cassini	Men's 10 km	1:55:59.7	24
Franco Cassini	Men's 25 km	DNF	
Joaquín Moreno	Men's 10 km	1:54:30.8	18
Candela Giordanino	Women's 10 km	2:06:02.6	23
Romina Imwinkelried	Women's 10 km	2:09:14.5	35
Romina Imwinkelried	Women's 25 km	DNF	

== Swimming ==
Athlete	Event	Heat		Semifinal		Final	
Athlete	Event	Time	Rank	Time	Rank	Time	Rank
Guido Buscaglia	Men's 50 m freestyle	22.55	32	did not advance			
Guido Buscaglia	Men's 100 m freestyle	50.19	44	did not advance			
Guido Buscaglia	Men's 50 m butterfly	24.39	45	did not advance			
Andrea Berrino	Women's 50 m backstroke	28.56	20	did not advance			
Andrea Berrino	Women's 100 m backstroke	1:02.13	23	did not advance			
Macarena Ceballos	Women's 50 m breaststroke	31.35	20	did not advance			
Macarena Ceballos	Women's 100 m breaststroke	1:08.63	23	did not advance			
Macarena Ceballos	Women's 200 m breaststroke	DQ					
Florencia Perotti	Women's 200 m individual medley	2:17.71	27	did not advance			
Florencia Perotti	Women's 400 m individual medley	4:55.43	15	—		did not advance	

== Water polo ==
Summary

Team	Event	Group stage				Playoff	Quarterfinal	Semifinal	Final / BM	
Team	Event	Opposition Score	Opposition Score	Opposition Score	Rank	Opposition Score	Opposition Score	Opposition Score	Opposition Score	Rank
Argentina	Women's tournament	Netherlands; L 6–29	South Africa; W 7–6	United States; L 3–23	3 P/Off	Hungary; L 6–23	—	New Zealand; L 7–11	Kazakhstan; L 6–12	12

=== Women's tournament ===
Team roster

The following is Argentinian roster in the Water polo at the 2022 World Aquatics Championships – Women's tournament.

Head coach: Guillermo Setti

- 1 Nahir Stegmayer GK
- 2 Lucia Ruiz Castellani FP
- 3 Cecilia Leonard FP
- 4 Ashley Hatcher FP
- 5 Ludmila Ianni FP
- 6 Julieta Auliel FP
- 7 Lara Romano Maitena FP
- 8 Carla Comba FP
- 9 Isabel Riley FP
- 10 Ana Agnesina FP
- 11 Anahí Bacigalupo FP
- 12 Dana Gerschcovsky FP
- 13 Lola Canales GK

Group play

Pos	Team	Pld	W	D	L	GF	GA	GD	Pts	Qualification
1	United States	3	3	0	0	58	12	+46	6	Quarterfinals
2	Netherlands	3	2	0	1	58	18	+40	4	Playoffs
3	Argentina	3	1	0	2	16	58	−42	2	Playoffs
4	South Africa	3	0	0	3	9	53	−44	0	

Source: Sportresult
Rules for classification: 1) points; 2) head-to-head points; 3) head-to-head goal difference; 4) head-to-head number of goals scored; 5) Goal difference.

20 June 2022; 19:30	Report	Netherlands	29–6	Argentina	Debrecen Swimming Pool Complex, Debrecen; Referees: Harvey Hinds (CUR), Edgar Baron (COL)
20 June 2022; 19:30	Report	Score by quarters: 8–1, 8–1, 6–2, 7–2			Debrecen Swimming Pool Complex, Debrecen; Referees: Harvey Hinds (CUR), Edgar Baron (COL)
20 June 2022; 19:30	Report	Van de Kraats 5	Goals	Ruiz 3	Debrecen Swimming Pool Complex, Debrecen; Referees: Harvey Hinds (CUR), Edgar Baron (COL)

22 June 2022; 18:00	Report	Argentina	7–6	South Africa	Debrecen Swimming Pool Complex, Debrecen; Referees: Adil Aimbetov (KAZ), Edgar Baron (COL)
22 June 2022; 18:00	Report	Score by quarters: 1–1, 1–2, 3–1, 2–2			Debrecen Swimming Pool Complex, Debrecen; Referees: Adil Aimbetov (KAZ), Edgar Baron (COL)
22 June 2022; 18:00	Report	Leonard 3	Goals	Vaughan 2	Debrecen Swimming Pool Complex, Debrecen; Referees: Adil Aimbetov (KAZ), Edgar Baron (COL)

24 June 2022; 18:00	Report	United States	23–3	Argentina	Debrecen Swimming Pool Complex, Debrecen; Referees: Harvey Hinds (CUR), Megan Perry (NZL)
24 June 2022; 18:00	Report	Score by quarters: 6–0, 5–0, 6–2, 6–1			Debrecen Swimming Pool Complex, Debrecen; Referees: Harvey Hinds (CUR), Megan Perry (NZL)
24 June 2022; 18:00	Report	Haralabidis, Weber 4	Goals	three players 1	Debrecen Swimming Pool Complex, Debrecen; Referees: Harvey Hinds (CUR), Megan Perry (NZL)

Playoffs

26 June 2022; 18:30	Report	Hungary	23–6	Argentina	Alfréd Hajós National Swimming Stadium, Budapest; Referees: Dion Willis (RSA), Maro Savinović (CRO)
26 June 2022; 18:30	Report	Score by quarters: 4–0, 7–2, 6–3, 6–1			Alfréd Hajós National Swimming Stadium, Budapest; Referees: Dion Willis (RSA), Maro Savinović (CRO)
26 June 2022; 18:30	Report	Gurisatti 5	Goals	Leonard 3	Alfréd Hajós National Swimming Stadium, Budapest; Referees: Dion Willis (RSA), Maro Savinović (CRO)

9th-12th place semifinal

28 June 2022; 17:00	Report	Argentina	7–13	New Zealand	Szeged Tiszavirag Pool, Szeged; Referees: Levan Berishvili (GEO), Radu Matache (ROU)
28 June 2022; 17:00	Report	Score by quarters: 3–3, 2–4, 1–4, 1–2			Szeged Tiszavirag Pool, Szeged; Referees: Levan Berishvili (GEO), Radu Matache (ROU)
28 June 2022; 17:00	Report	Ruiz 3	Goals	five players 2	Szeged Tiszavirag Pool, Szeged; Referees: Levan Berishvili (GEO), Radu Matache (ROU)

Eleventh place game

30 June 2022; 17:00	Report	Argentina	6–12	Kazakhstan	Szeged Tiszavirag Pool, Szeged; Referees: Levan Berishvili (GEO), Edgar Baron (COL)
30 June 2022; 17:00	Report	Score by quarters: 2–4, 1–3, 1–3, 2–2			Szeged Tiszavirag Pool, Szeged; Referees: Levan Berishvili (GEO), Edgar Baron (COL)
30 June 2022; 17:00	Report	Leonard 3	Goals	Roga 5	Szeged Tiszavirag Pool, Szeged; Referees: Levan Berishvili (GEO), Edgar Baron (COL)
