= Jarrod Poort =

Australian swimmer

Personal information
- Nickname: "Poorty"
- National team: Australia
- Born: 31 October 1994 (age 31) Hurstville, New South Wales
- Height: 1.85 m (6 ft 1 in)
- Weight: 105 kg (231 lb)

Sport
- Sport: Swimming
- Strokes: Freestyle
- Club: West Illawarra Aquatic SC
- Coach: Ron Mckeon, James Greathead
Medal record
Pan Pacific Championships
Silver medal – second place	2014 Gold Coast	10 km open water

Jarrod Poort (born 31 October 1994) is an Australian former competitive swimmer and two-time Olympian. Poort specialising in distance freestyle and open-water swimming competing at the international level from 2012 - 2017 on the Australian swim team.

Poort represented Australia in the 1500 metre freestyle at the 2012 Summer Olympics in London. He competed in the 2016 Summer Olympics in Rio de Janeiro, Brazil, in the 10-kilometre marathon swimming event. In the race he built a lead of 1 minute and 20 seconds, but was caught 1 km before the finish, and finished 21st. Poort trained out of Wollongong, NSW, representing West Illawarra Aquatic Swim Club.

Other than his Olympic pursuits Poort notably won both the 2017 Rottnest Channel Swim and the Port to Pub swims in Perth; two of Australia's longest and toughest swims. 2017 also witnessed him defend his Australian Champion 10 km title for the third year running; he then went on to narrowly take silver in the 2017 Australian Open Mens surf race at the Australian titles behind Ollie Signorini.

Poort is also part of the record holding Australian team (Tattersalls Masters Australia) whom hold the title as the fastest team across the Maui Channel. The swim starts at the pier on the island of Lanai and ends on the beach in front of the Kaanapali Beach Hotel on the island of Maui. Poort alongside Rhys Mainstone, Wallace Eggleton, George O'Brien, Ollie Signorini and Peter Thiel hold the record in 2.45.20 for the 9.9-mile crossing.

In April 2021, Poort announced his introduction to triathlon. Later that year, Poort successfully defended his Kalkite to Jindabyne open water title. The event, hosted by Thredbo Open Water Swimming Association, attracted plenty of talent. Poort held off noted English Channel swimmer and philanthropist, Ned Wieland, crossing the line in 2:25:31.

As of 2024, Jarrod has joined the West Brisbane Mah Jong Club, with plans to enter competitions in the Financial Year 2025.

Jarrod has a particular interest in mythical creatures, with a focus on the albino Sasquatch of North-Western United States of America.

== Competition record ==
Year	Competition	Venue	Position	Event	Notes
Representing Australia
2012	Olympic Games	London, United Kingdom	18th	1500 metre freestyle	15:20.82
2016	Olympic Games	Rio de Janeiro, Brazil	21st	10km	1:53:40.7
