= Chile at the 2017 World Aquatics Championships =

- Flag of Chile
- World Aquatics code: CHI
- National federation: Federación Chilena de Deportes Acuáticos
- Website: www.fechida.cl

in Budapest, Hungary
- Competitors: 8 in 4 sports
- Medals: Gold 0 Silver 0 Bronze 0 Total 0

World Aquatics Championships appearances
- 1973; 1975; 1978; 1982; 1986; 1991; 1994; 1998; 2001; 2003; 2005; 2007; 2009; 2011; 2013; 2015; 2017; 2019; 2022; 2023; 2024; 2025

Chile is scheduled to compete at the 2017 World Aquatics Championships in Budapest, Hungary from 14 July to 30 July.

== Diving ==
Chile has entered 2 divers (two male).

Men

Athlete	Event	Preliminaries		Semifinals		Final	
Athlete	Event	Points	Rank	Points	Rank	Points	Rank
Diego Carquin	1 m springboard	265.95	43	—N/a		Did not advance	
Donato Neglia	1 m springboard	256.80	46	—N/a		Did not advance	
Diego Carquin	3 m springboard	189.35	55	Did not advance			
Donato Neglia	3 m springboard	285.00	49	Did not advance			
Diego Carquin; Donato Neglia	3 m synchronized springboard	295.23	20	—N/a		Did not advance	

== Open water swimming ==
Chile has entered one open water swimmer

Athlete	Event	Time	Rank
Mahina Valdivia	Women's 5 km	1:06:11.5	45
Mahina Valdivia	Women's 10 km	2:11:55.1	46
Mahina Valdivia	Women's 25 km	Did not finish	

== Swimming ==
Chilean swimmers have achieved qualifying standards in the following events (up to a maximum of 2 swimmers in each event at the A-standard entry time, and 1 at the B-standard):

Athlete	Event	Heat		Semifinal		Final	
Athlete	Event	Time	Rank	Time	Rank	Time	Rank
Oliver Elliot	Men's 50 m freestyle	23.35	61	Did not advance			
Oliver Elliot	Men's 50 m butterfly	25.23	52	Did not advance			
Felipe Tapia	Men's 400 m freestyle	4:10.39	50	—N/a		Did not advance	
Felipe Tapia	Men's 1500 m freestyle	DNS		—N/a		Did not advance	
Kristel Köbrich	Women's 800 m freestyle	8:34.51	12	—N/a		Did not advance	
Kristel Köbrich	Women's 1500 m freestyle	16:17.28	6 Q	—N/a		16:13.46	6

== Synchronized swimming ==
Chile's synchronized swimming team consisted of 2 athletes (2 female).

Women

Athlete	Event	Preliminaries		Final	
Athlete	Event	Points	Rank	Points	Rank
Isidora Letelier	Solo technical routine	72.4317	22	Did not advance	
Bianca Consigliere	Solo free routine	73.1000	23	Did not advance	
Bianca Consigliere; Isidora Letelier	Duet free routine	72.3667	34	Did not advance	
