= Cuba at the 2017 World Aquatics Championships =

- Flag of Cuba
- FINA code: CUB
- National federation: Federación Cubaña de Natación

in Budapest, Hungary
- Competitors: 13 in 3 sports
- Medals: Gold 0 Silver 0 Bronze 0 Total 0

World Aquatics Championships appearances
- 1973; 1975; 1978; 1982; 1986; 1991; 1994; 1998; 2001; 2003; 2005; 2007; 2009; 2011; 2013; 2015; 2017; 2019; 2022; 2023; 2024

Cuba is scheduled to compete at the 2017 World Aquatics Championships in Budapest, Hungary from 14 July to 30 July.

== Diving ==
Cuba has entered 6 divers (four male and two female).

Men

Athlete	Event	Preliminaries		Semifinals		Final	
Athlete	Event	Points	Rank	Points	Rank	Points	Rank
Carlos Escalona	1 m springboard	282.20	42	—		did not advance	
Arturo Valdes	1 m springboard	211.40	50	—		did not advance	
Carlos Escalona	3 m springboard	265.25	53	did not advance			
Arturo Valdes	3 m springboard	287.40	48	did not advance			
Jeinkler Aguirre	10 m platform	342.40	31	did not advance			
Yusmandy Paz	10 m platform	330.00	32	did not advance			

Women

Athlete	Event	Preliminaries		Semifinals		Final	
Athlete	Event	Points	Rank	Points	Rank	Points	Rank
Prisis Ruiz	1 m springboard	171.05	42	—		did not advance	
Prisis Ruiz	3 m springboard	196.00	40	did not advance			
Tuti García	10 m platform	272.60	25	did not advance			

Mixed

Athlete	Event	Final	
Athlete	Event	Points	Rank
Tuti García; Jeinkler Aguirre	10 m synchronized platform	256.35	14

== Swimming ==
Cuban swimmers have achieved qualifying standards in the following events (up to a maximum of 2 swimmers in each event at the A-standard entry time, and 1 at the B-standard):

Athlete	Event	Heat		Semifinal		Final	
Athlete	Event	Time	Rank	Time	Rank	Time	Rank
Hanser García	Men's 50 m freestyle	22.70	37	did not advance			
Hanser García	Men's 100 m freestyle	49.33	30	did not advance			
Luis Vega Torres	Men's 200 m individual medley	2:08.91	40	did not advance			
Luis Vega Torres	Men's 400 m individual medley	4:30.77	32	—		did not advance	
Lazaro Vergara	Men's 200 m butterfly	2:03.19	38	did not advance			

== Synchronized swimming ==
Cuba's synchronized swimming team consisted of 4 athletes (4 female).

Women

Athlete	Event	Preliminaries		Final	
Athlete	Event	Points	Rank	Points	Rank
Carysney García	Solo technical routine	65.4680	29	did not advance	
Melissa Alonso Diaz	Solo free routine	66.7000	32	did not advance	
Arisnelvis Cerpa; Carysney García	Duet technical routine	66.1458	38	did not advance	
Melissa Alonso Diaz; Carelys Valdes	Duet free routine	64.9333	42	did not advance	
