= Argentina at the 2023 World Aquatics Championships =

- Flag of Argentina
- World Aquatics code: ARG
- National federation: Argentinian Confederation of Water Sports

in Fukuoka, Japan
- Competitors: 36 in 4 sports
- Medals: Gold 0 Silver 0 Bronze 0 Total 0

World Aquatics Championships appearances
- 1973; 1975; 1978; 1982; 1986; 1991; 1994; 1998; 2001; 2003; 2005; 2007; 2009; 2011; 2013; 2015; 2017; 2019; 2022; 2023; 2024; 2025

Argentina competed at the 2023 World Aquatics Championships in Fukuoka, Japan from 14 to 30 July.

== Artistic swimming ==
Women

Athlete	Event	Preliminaries		Final	
Athlete	Event	Points	Rank	Points	Rank
Tiziana Bonucci; Luisina Caussi	Duet technical routine	167.4149	30	did not advance	
Tiziana Bonucci; Luisina Caussi	Duet free routine	120.1125	30	did not advance	

== Open water swimming ==
Argentina entered 4 open water swimmers.

Men

Athlete	Event	Time	Rank
Franco Cassini	Men's 10 km	1:54:07.4	21
Joaquín Moreno	Men's 10 km	1:54:09.7	24

Women

Athlete	Event	Time	Rank
Cecilia Biagioli	Women's 10 km	2:03:47.2	20
Candela Giordanino	Women's 5 km	1:02:24.7	29
Candela Giordanino	Women's 10 km	2:09:07.2	36

Mixed

Athlete	Event	Time	Rank
Cecilia Biagioli; Franco Cassini; Candela Giordanino; Joaquín Moreno	Team relay	1:14:53.7	12

== Swimming ==
Argentina entered 4 swimmers.

Men

Athlete	Event	Heat		Semifinal		Final	
Athlete	Event	Time	Rank	Time	Rank	Time	Rank
Guido Buscaglia	50 metre freestyle	22.56	43	Did not advance			
Guido Buscaglia	100 metre freestyle	50.02	45	Did not advance			
Guido Buscaglia	50 metre butterfly	24.47	52	Did not advance			

Women

Athlete	Event	Heat		Semifinal		Final	
Athlete	Event	Time	Rank	Time	Rank	Time	Rank
Andrea Berrino	50 metre freestyle	25.67	33	Did not advance			
Andrea Berrino	50 metre backstroke	28.24	16 Q	28.34	16	Did not advance	
Andrea Berrino	100 metre backstroke	1:02.34	32	Did not advance			
Macarena Ceballos	50 metre breaststroke	30.97	20	Did not advance			
Macarena Ceballos	100 metre breaststroke	1:06.69 NR	12 Q	1:06.75	12	Did not advance	
Macarena Ceballos	200 metre breaststroke	2:26.18	14 Q	2:26.68	16	Did not advance	
Florencia Perotti	200 metre individual medley	2:17.73	29	Did not advance			
Florencia Perotti	400 metre individual medley	4:52.48	29	—		Did not advance	

== Water polo ==
Summary

Team	Event	Group stage				Playoff	Quarterfinal	Semifinal	Final / BM	
Team	Event	Opposition score	Opposition score	Opposition score	Rank	Opposition score	Opposition score	Opposition score	Opposition score	Rank
Argentina	Men's tournament	Croatia; L 5–24	Japan; L 9–20	Hungary; L 13–21	4	—	—	South Africa; W 15–6	Kazakhstan; W 11–7	13
Argentina	Women's tournament	Italy; L 1–27	Greece; L 2–21	South Africa; L 9–12	4	—	—	Japan; L 11–21	Kazakhstan; L 8–10	16

=== Men's tournament ===
Team roster

The following is the Argentine roster.

Head coach: Juan Pablo Giri

- 1 Diego Malnero GK
- 2 Ramiro Veich FP
- 3 Tomás Galimberti FP
- 4 Tomás Tilatti FP
- 5 Nahuel Leona FP
- 6 Tomás Echenique FP
- 7 Guido Martino FP
- 8 Eduardo Bonomo FP
- 9 Carlos Camnasio FP
- 10 Esteban Corsi FP
- 11 Guido Poggi FP
- 12 Teo Soler FP
- 13 Octavio Salas GK

Group play

Pos	Team	Pld	W	PSW	PSL	L	GF	GA	GD	Pts	Qualification
1	Hungary	3	3	0	0	0	49	31	+18	9	Quarterfinals
2	Croatia	3	2	0	0	1	51	29	+22	6	Playoffs
3	Japan (H)	3	1	0	0	2	40	42	−2	3	Playoffs
4	Argentina	3	0	0	0	3	27	65	−38	0	

Source: Sportresult
Rules for classification: 1) points; 2) head-to-head points; 3) head-to-head goal difference; 4) head-to-head number of goals scored; 5) Goal difference.
(H) Host

17 July 2023; 16:00	Report	Argentina	5–24	Croatia	Marine Messe Fukuoka, Fukuoka; Referees: David Couper (NZL), Jennifer McCall (USA)
17 July 2023; 16:00	Report	Score by quarters: 2–8, 1–4, 0–7, 2–5			Marine Messe Fukuoka, Fukuoka; Referees: David Couper (NZL), Jennifer McCall (USA)
17 July 2023; 16:00	Report	five players 1	Goals	Marinić Kragić 5	Marine Messe Fukuoka, Fukuoka; Referees: David Couper (NZL), Jennifer McCall (USA)

19 July 2023; 19:00	Report	Japan	20–9	Argentina	Marine Messe Fukuoka, Fukuoka; Referees: Zhang Liang (CHN), Darren Spiritsanto (USA)
19 July 2023; 19:00	Report	Score by quarters: 6–1, 4–2, 4–2, 6–4			Marine Messe Fukuoka, Fukuoka; Referees: Zhang Liang (CHN), Darren Spiritsanto (USA)
19 July 2023; 19:00	Report	Watanabe 5	Goals	Martino 3	Marine Messe Fukuoka, Fukuoka; Referees: Zhang Liang (CHN), Darren Spiritsanto (USA)

21 July 2023; 09:00	Report	Hungary	21–13	Argentina	Marine Messe Fukuoka, Fukuoka; Referees: Zhang Liang (CHN), Alessia Ferrari (ITA)
21 July 2023; 09:00	Report	Score by quarters: 7–1, 5–4, 4–4, 5–4			Marine Messe Fukuoka, Fukuoka; Referees: Zhang Liang (CHN), Alessia Ferrari (ITA)
21 July 2023; 09:00	Report	Vigvári 4	Goals	Camnasio, Corsi 3	Marine Messe Fukuoka, Fukuoka; Referees: Zhang Liang (CHN), Alessia Ferrari (ITA)

13–16th place semifinals

23 July 2023; 10:30	Report	Argentina	15–6	South Africa	Marine Messe Fukuoka, Fukuoka; Referees: Nóra Debreceni (HUN), David Couper (NZL)
23 July 2023; 10:30	Report	Score by quarters: 3–0, 4–2, 5–1, 3–3			Marine Messe Fukuoka, Fukuoka; Referees: Nóra Debreceni (HUN), David Couper (NZL)
23 July 2023; 10:30	Report	Camnasio 4	Goals	Wheeler 2	Marine Messe Fukuoka, Fukuoka; Referees: Nóra Debreceni (HUN), David Couper (NZL)

13th place game

25 July 2023; 10:30	Report	Kazakhstan	7–11	Argentina	Marine Messe Fukuoka, Fukuoka; Referees: Marta Cabanas (ESP), Lee-Anne Stewart (RSA)
25 July 2023; 10:30	Report	Score by quarters: 1–5, 1–1, 3–3, 2–2			Marine Messe Fukuoka, Fukuoka; Referees: Marta Cabanas (ESP), Lee-Anne Stewart (RSA)
25 July 2023; 10:30	Report	Markovich, Vuksanovich 2	Goals	Corsi 4	Marine Messe Fukuoka, Fukuoka; Referees: Marta Cabanas (ESP), Lee-Anne Stewart (RSA)

=== Women's tournament ===
Team roster

The following is the Argentine roster.

Head coach: Guillermo Setti

- 1 Nahir Stegmayer GK
- 2 Lucía Ruiz FP
- 3 Cecilia Leonard FP
- 4 Ashley Hatcher FP
- 5 Ludmila Ianni FP
- 6 Magalí Bacigalupo FP
- 7 Julieta Auliel FP
- 8 Carla Comba FP
- 9 Isabel Riley FP
- 10 Ana Agnesina FP
- 11 Anahí Bacigalupo FP
- 12 María Canda FP
- 13 Aldana Videberrigain GK

Group play

Pos	Team	Pld	W	PSW	PSL	L	GF	GA	GD	Pts	Qualification
1	Greece	3	3	0	0	0	61	16	+45	9	Quarterfinals
2	Italy	3	2	0	0	1	63	19	+44	6	Playoffs
3	South Africa	3	1	0	0	2	16	57	−41	3	Playoffs
4	Argentina	3	0	0	0	3	12	60	−48	0	

Source: Sportresult
Rules for classification: 1) points; 2) head-to-head points; 3) head-to-head goal difference; 4) head-to-head number of goals scored; 5) Goal difference.

16 July 2023; 16:00	Report	Italy	27–1	Argentina	Marine Messe Fukuoka, Fukuoka; Referees: Adil Aimbetov (KAZ), Sébastien Dervieux (FRA)
16 July 2023; 16:00	Report	Score by quarters: 3–1, 7–0, 6–0, 11–0			Marine Messe Fukuoka, Fukuoka; Referees: Adil Aimbetov (KAZ), Sébastien Dervieux (FRA)
16 July 2023; 16:00	Report	Avegno 4	Goals	Leonard 1	Marine Messe Fukuoka, Fukuoka; Referees: Adil Aimbetov (KAZ), Sébastien Dervieux (FRA)

18 July 2023; 13:30	Report	Argentina	2–21	Greece	Marine Messe Fukuoka, Fukuoka; Referees: Adil Aimbetov (KAZ), Nicola Johnson (AUS)
18 July 2023; 13:30	Report	Score by quarters: 1–6, 0–5, 1–6, 0–4			Marine Messe Fukuoka, Fukuoka; Referees: Adil Aimbetov (KAZ), Nicola Johnson (AUS)
18 July 2023; 13:30	Report	Bacigalupo, Hatcher 1	Goals	three players 3	Marine Messe Fukuoka, Fukuoka; Referees: Adil Aimbetov (KAZ), Nicola Johnson (AUS)

20 July 2023; 09:00	Report	Argentina	9–12	South Africa	Marine Messe Fukuoka, Fukuoka; Referees: David Gómez (ESP), Jennifer McCall (USA),
20 July 2023; 09:00	Report	Score by quarters: 2–2, 3–5, 2–2, 2–3			Marine Messe Fukuoka, Fukuoka; Referees: David Gómez (ESP), Jennifer McCall (USA),
20 July 2023; 09:00	Report	Auliel 4	Goals	Meecham 3	Marine Messe Fukuoka, Fukuoka; Referees: David Gómez (ESP), Jennifer McCall (USA),

13–16th place semifinals

22 July 2023; 10:30	Report	Argentina	11–21	Japan	Marine Messe Fukuoka, Fukuoka; Referees: Alessia Ferrari (ITA), Lee-Anne Stewart (RSA)
22 July 2023; 10:30	Report	Score by quarters: 0–8, 3–4, 5–4, 3–5			Marine Messe Fukuoka, Fukuoka; Referees: Alessia Ferrari (ITA), Lee-Anne Stewart (RSA)
22 July 2023; 10:30	Report	Bacigalupo 3	Goals	Arima, Nishiyama 4	Marine Messe Fukuoka, Fukuoka; Referees: Alessia Ferrari (ITA), Lee-Anne Stewart (RSA)

15th place game

24 July 2023; 09:00	Report	Kazakhstan	10–8	Argentina	Marine Messe Fukuoka, Fukuoka; Referees: Raffaele Colombo (ITA), Nicola Johnson (AUS)
24 July 2023; 09:00	Report	Score by quarters: 3–0, 3–3, 2–4, 2–1			Marine Messe Fukuoka, Fukuoka; Referees: Raffaele Colombo (ITA), Nicola Johnson (AUS)
24 July 2023; 09:00	Report	Khritankova, Novikova 3	Goals	Bacigalupo 4	Marine Messe Fukuoka, Fukuoka; Referees: Raffaele Colombo (ITA), Nicola Johnson (AUS)
