= Chen Yejie =

Chinese swimmer

Personal information
- Born: 6 April 2001 (age 25)

Sport
- Sport: Swimming

Chen Yejie (born 6 April 2001) is a Chinese swimmer. She competed in the women's 1500 metre freestyle event at the 2017 World Aquatics Championships held in Budapest, Hungary.
