= Diving at the 2023 Pan American Games – Women's 3 metre springboard =

Women's 3 metre springboard at the 2023 Pan American Games
- Venue: Aquatics Centre
- Dates: October 24
- Competitors: 17 from 9 nations
- Winning score: 342.75

Medalists
Gold medal	Pamela Ware	Canada
Silver medal	Arantxa Chávez	Mexico
Bronze medal	Krysta Palmer	United States

The women's 3 metre springboard competition of the diving events at the 2023 Pan American Games was held on October 24 at the Aquatics Centre in Santiago, Chile. A total of 18 divers from 9 countries took part.

== Qualification ==
A total of up to 80 divers (40 per gender) across all events qualified to compete. A nation may enter a maximum of 10 divers (if entering teams in synchronized diving) or 6 athletes (if not entering teams in synchronized diving), with the exception of the winners of the 2021 Junior Pan American Games, provided that these athletes participate only in the event in which they qualified in Cali. The host nation (Chile) automatically qualified a full team of 10 athletes (five per gender). The top 18 men and women in individual events in the 2022 and 2023 FINA World Championships will secure spots for their NOCs. In addition, at each of the CONSANAT Championships (Zone 1) and the PAQ Qualifying Diving Championships (Zone 2), divers from federations competing in such events may earn a quota position for their NOCs provided that the total number of divers from such Zones do not exceed 24 divers on all boards (including those who are ranked in FINA from such competing federations but excluding any divers from CHI). Zone 3 and 4 divers do not have separate qualifiers within their zones. National championships or trials events in Zones 3 and 4 may be used to name divers to already qualified positions.

== Schedule ==
Date	Time	Round
October 24, 2023	11:00	Preliminary
October 24, 2023	20:55	Final

== Results ==
Green denotes finalists

Rank	Diver	Nationality	Preliminary		Final	
Rank	Diver	Nationality	Points	Rank	Points	Rank
1st place, gold medalist(s)	Pamela Ware	Canada	285.45	5	342.75	1
2nd place, silver medalist(s)	Arantxa Chávez	Mexico	329.25	1	336.85	2
3rd place, bronze medalist(s)	Krysta Palmer	United States	312.60	2	323.85	3
4	Hailey Hernández	United States	306.60	3	321.40	4
5	Prisis Ruiz	Cuba	247.40	8	308.10	5
6	Mia Vallée	Canada	300.10	4	292.85	6
7	Elizabeth Pérez	Venezuela	260.75	6	264.20	7
8	Daniela Zapata	Colombia	244.35	10	262.60	8
9	Frida Zuñiga	Mexico	246.15	9	244.70	9
10	Anisley García	Cuba	249.20	7	244.20	10
11	Viviana Uribe	Colombia	238.20	11	229.85	11
12	Elizabeth Miclau	Puerto Rico	234.70	12	229.55	12
13	Carolina Mendoza	Mexico	232.95	13	Did not advance	
14	Ana Ricci	Peru	227.15	14	Did not advance	
15	Luana Lira	Brazil	208.85	15	Did not advance	
16	Anna Santos	Brazil	199.00	16	Did not advance	
17	Pamela Reyes	Peru	144.20	17	Did not advance	
