= Jack Burnell =

English swimmer (born 1993)

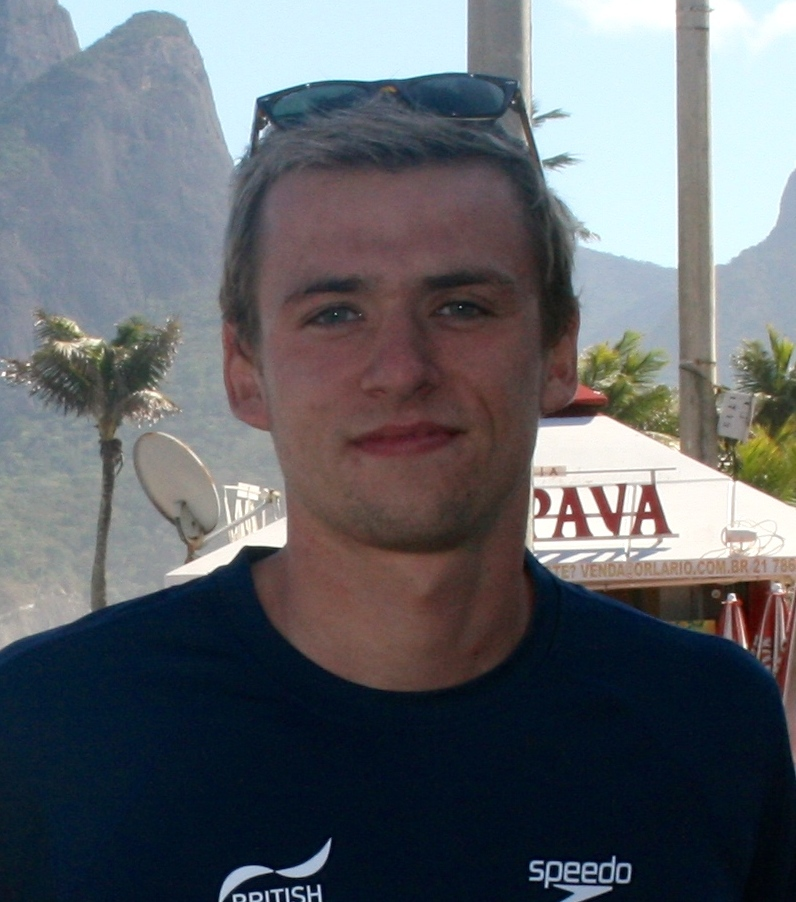
- Burnell in 2015

Personal information
- Born: 13 June 1993 (age 33) Scunthorpe, Lincolnshire, England
- Height: 1.85 m (6 ft 1 in)
- Weight: 72 kg (159 lb)

Sport
- Country: United Kingdom
- Sport: Swimming
- Events: Open water swimming, marathon
- Club: National Centre Loughborough
- Coached by: Dave Hemmings

Achievements and titles
- Highest world ranking: European medallist

Jack Burnell (born 13 June 1993) is an English retired swimmer. He won a silver medal in the 10 km race at the European Open Water Swimming Championships in 2016 but was disqualified during the same event at the 2016 Olympic Games. He retired from swimming in 2021 and now works as a performance mindset coach for the football team Brentford FC.

== Career ==
Burnell competed at the Kazan World Championships, and recorded a fifth-place finish in the 10 km marathon. This placing secured Burnell's place in the 2016 Rio Olympics, being the first Briton to secure his place.

Burnell competed in the marathon swimming event at the 2016 Summer Olympics, with the event beginning at the Copacabana Beach. In the men's 10 kilometre open water event, he was disqualified after receiving two yellow cards for unnecessary contact with other swimmers, though he initially appeared to have finished fifth alongside Marc-Antoine Olivier and Zu Lijun. The second yellow card came close to the finishing line after a tussle with the defending Olympic champion, Oussama Mellouli, who was also given a yellow card but ultimately finished 12th. In an angry interview following the race, Burnell claimed that Mellouli had grabbed his leg and that it may have stopped him from winning, and said the first card for unnecessary contact had been awarded when there were no other swimmers around. His appeal against the judges' decision was not successful.

Burnell won a gold medal victory at the 2017 FINA World Cup in Abu Dhabi. Ahead of the World Championships in Budapest that year, he revealed that he had been struggling with "nightmares and depression" since the 2016 Olympics: "Sometimes I forget and I don't think about it for a few days, but then there'll just be something that triggers the memory. Then I'm feeling depressed about it and I think about how it was four years of hard work down the drain. I'll be laying in bed and I can sometimes feel [Mellouli's] hand on my leg. At that point it sends shivers down my spine." He went on to finish in fourth place in Hungary.

Burnell finished 24th at the Doha World Cup in March and then announced his retirement from the sport the following month, ending his bid to reach the postponed Tokyo Olympic Games. He currently works as a performance mindset coach for the football team Brentford FC.

== Personal life ==
Burnell began dating English singer Ella Henderson in 2020. In January 2023, he got engaged to Ella Henderson whilst on holiday in Mauritius.
