= Venezuela at the 2017 World Aquatics Championships =

- Flag of Venezuela
- World Aquatics code: VEN
- National federation: Federación Venezolana de Deportes Acuáticos
- Website: www.feveda.com.ve

in Budapest, Hungary
- Competitors: 15 in 3 sports
- Medals: Gold 0 Silver 0 Bronze 0 Total 0

World Aquatics Championships appearances
- 1973; 1975; 1978; 1982; 1986; 1991; 1994; 1998; 2001; 2003; 2005; 2007; 2009; 2011; 2013; 2015; 2017; 2019; 2022; 2023; 2024; 2025

Venezuela is scheduled to compete at the 2017 World Aquatics Championships in Budapest, Hungary from 14 July to 30 July.

== Diving ==
Venezuela has entered 2 divers (one male and one female).

Athlete	Event	Preliminaries		Semifinals		Final	
Athlete	Event	Points	Rank	Points	Rank	Points	Rank
Jesús Liranzo	Men's 3 m springboard	320.80	42	did not advance			
Jesús Liranzo	Men's 10 m platform	407.55	16 Q	373.05	17	did not advance	
María Betancourt	Women's 1 m springboard	236.50	24	—N/a		did not advance	
María Betancourt	Women's 10 m platform	247.85	31	did not advance			
María Betancourt; Jesús Liranzo	Mixed team	—N/a				349.75	8

== Open water swimming ==
Venezuela has entered four open water swimmers

Athlete	Event	Time	Rank
Johndry Segovia	Men's 5 km	55:00.5	20
Johndry Segovia	Men's 10 km	1:53:39.6	31
Juan José Segovia	Men's 5 km	56:32.8	43
Juan José Segovia	Men's 10 km	1:54:37.0	37
Ruthseli Aponte	Women's 5 km	1:06:55.9	47
Ruthseli Aponte	Women's 10 km	2:14:39.5	49
Vicenia Navarro	Women's 25 km	did not finish	

== Swimming ==
Venezuelan swimmers have achieved qualifying standards in the following events (up to a maximum of 2 swimmers in each event at the A-standard entry time, and 1 at the B-standard):

Men

Athlete	Event	Heat		Semifinal		Final	
Athlete	Event	Time	Rank	Time	Rank	Time	Rank
Carlos Claverie	50 m breaststroke	28.28	39	did not advance			
Carlos Claverie	100 m breaststroke	1:00.83	28	did not advance			
Carlos Claverie	200 m breaststroke	2:11.71	19	did not advance			
Marcos Lavado	100 m butterfly	53.97	=45	did not advance			
Marcos Lavado	200 m butterfly	1:57.37	19	did not advance			
Robinson Molina	50 m backstroke	25.94	36	did not advance			
Carlos Omaña	200 m backstroke	2:03.13	35	did not advance			
Carlos Omaña	200 m individual medley	2:06.29	37	did not advance			
Carlos Omaña	400 m individual medley	DNS		—N/a		did not advance	
Cristian Quintero	50 m freestyle	22.87	46	did not advance			
Cristian Quintero	100 m freestyle	49.19	29	did not advance			
Cristian Quintero	200 m freestyle	1:48.22	33	did not advance			
Cristian Quintero	400 m freestyle	3:53.04	27	—N/a		did not advance	

Women

Athlete	Event	Heat		Semifinal		Final	
Athlete	Event	Time	Rank	Time	Rank	Time	Rank
Isabella Paéz	100 m butterfly	1:00.90	30	did not advance			
Isabella Paéz	200 m butterfly	2:14.98	29	did not advance			
Andreina Pinto	200 m freestyle	DNS		did not advance			
Andreina Pinto	400 m freestyle	4:17.46	21	—N/a		did not advance	
Jeserik Pinto	50 m freestyle	26.19	39	did not advance			
Jeserik Pinto	50 m backstroke	29.50	40	did not advance			
Mercedes Toledo	50 m breaststroke	32.24	29	did not advance			
Mercedes Toledo	200 m breaststroke	2:35.20	26	did not advance			
