= Argentina at the 2019 World Aquatics Championships =

- Flag of Argentina
- World Aquatics code: ARG
- National federation: Argentine Confederation of Aquatic Sports
- Website: cadda.org.ar (in Spanish)

in Gwangju, South Korea
- Competitors: 6 in 3 sports
- Medals: Gold 0 Silver 0 Bronze 0 Total 0

World Aquatics Championships appearances
- 1973; 1975; 1978; 1982; 1986; 1991; 1994; 1998; 2001; 2003; 2005; 2007; 2009; 2011; 2013; 2015; 2017; 2019; 2022; 2023; 2024; 2025

Argentina competed at the 2019 World Aquatics Championships in Gwangju, South Korea from 12 to 28 July.

== Artistic swimming ==
Argentina's artistic swimming team consisted of 2 athletes (2 female).

Women

Athlete	Event	Preliminaries		Final	
Athlete	Event	Points	Rank	Points	Rank
Trinidad López	Solo technical routine	68.0890	26	did not advance	
Camila Arregui	Solo free routine	74.6333	25	did not advance	
Camila Arregui; Trinidad López	Duet technical routine	75.5435	30	did not advance	
Camila Arregui; Trinidad López	Duet free routine	75.9333	29	did not advance	

== Open water swimming ==
Argentina qualified two male and one female open water swimmers.

Men

Athlete	Event	Time	Rank
Santiago Arteta	Men's 10 km	1:50:24.1	40
Joaquin Moreno	Men's 10 km	1:51:45.7	46

Women

Athlete	Event	Time	Rank
Julia Arino	Women's 5 km	58:17.9	26
Julia Arino	Women's 10 km	1:56:32.2	32

== Swimming ==
Argentina has entered three swimmers.

Men

Athlete	Event	Heat		Semifinal		Final	
Athlete	Event	Time	Rank	Time	Rank	Time	Rank
Joaquin Moreno	800 m freestyle	8:18.24	33	—N/a		did not advance	
Joaquin Moreno	1500 m freestyle	15:48.98	31	—N/a		did not advance	
Roberto Strelkov	50 m butterfly	23.99	33	did not advance			
Roberto Strelkov	100 m butterfly	54.11	39	did not advance			

Women

Athlete	Event	Heat		Semifinal		Final	
Athlete	Event	Time	Rank	Time	Rank	Time	Rank
Julia Arino	800 m freestyle	9:04.02	34	—N/a		did not advance	
Julia Arino	1500 m freestyle	17:17.99	27	—N/a		did not advance	
