= Argentina at the 2024 World Aquatics Championships =

- Flag of Argentina
- World Aquatics code: ARG
- National federation: Confederación Argentina de Deportes Acuáticos

in Doha, Qatar
- Competitors: 10 in 3 sports
- Medals: Gold 0 Silver 0 Bronze 0 Total 0

World Aquatics Championships appearances
- 1973; 1975; 1978; 1982; 1986; 1991; 1994; 1998; 2001; 2003; 2005; 2007; 2009; 2011; 2013; 2015; 2017; 2019; 2022; 2023; 2024; 2025

Argentina competed at the 2024 World Aquatics Championships in Doha, Qatar from 2 to 18 February.

== Competitors ==
The following is the list of competitors in the Championships.

Sport	Men	Women	Total
Artistic swimming	0	2	2
Open water swimming	2	2	4
Swimming	1	3	4
Total	3	7	10

== Artistic swimming ==
Women

Athlete	Event	Preliminaries		Final	
Athlete	Event	Points	Rank	Points	Rank
Tiziana Bonucci; Luisina Caussi	Duet technical routine	169.2433	38	Did not advance	
Tiziana Bonucci; Luisina Caussi	Duet free routine	111.6167	34	Did not advance	

== Open water swimming ==
Men

Athlete	Event	Time	Rank
Lucas Alba	Men's 10 km	1:50:08.5	30
Franco Cassini	Men's 10 km	1:52:08.6	35

Women

Athlete	Event	Time	Rank
Cecilia Biagioli	Women's 10 km	DNF	
Candela Giordanino	Women's 10 km	2:03:09.1	33

Mixed

Athlete	Event	Time	Rank
Lucas Alba; Cecilia Biagioli; Franco Cassini; Candela Giordanino	Team relay	1:07:03.2	9

== Swimming ==
Argentina entered 4 swimmers.

Men

Athlete	Event	Heat		Semifinal		Final	
Athlete	Event	Time	Rank	Time	Rank	Time	Rank
Ulises Saravia	50 metre backstroke	25.02	10 Q	25.13	15	Did not advance	
Ulises Saravia	100 metre backstroke	54.60	20	Did not advance			

Women

Athlete	Event	Heat		Semifinal		Final	
Athlete	Event	Time	Rank	Time	Rank	Time	Rank
Andrea Berrino	50 metre freestyle	25.66	29	Did not advance			
Andrea Berrino	50 metre backstroke	28.70	20	Did not advance			
Andrea Berrino	100 metre backstroke	1:02.02	21	Did not advance			
Macarena Ceballos	50 metre breaststroke	31.32	18	Did not advance			
Macarena Ceballos	100 metre breaststroke	1:07.61	14 Q	1:07.49	15	Did not advance	
Macarena Ceballos	200 metre breaststroke	2:28.94	17	Did not advance			
Agostina Hein	400 metre freestyle	4:08.86	8 Q	—		4:10.33	8
Agostina Hein	800 metre freestyle	8:29.44	5 Q	—		8:29.19	5
Agostina Hein	1500 metre freestyle	16:21.68	11	—		Did not advance	
Agostina Hein	400 metre individual medley	4:47.45	14	—		Did not advance	
