= Spain at the 2017 World Aquatics Championships =

- Flag of Spain
- World Aquatics code: ESP
- National federation: Real Federación Española de Natación
- Website: www.rfen.es

in Budapest, Hungary
- Competitors: 51 in 5 sports
- Medals Ranked 11th: Gold 1 Silver 5 Bronze 0 Total 6

World Aquatics Championships appearances
- 1973; 1975; 1978; 1982; 1986; 1991; 1994; 1998; 2001; 2003; 2005; 2007; 2009; 2011; 2013; 2015; 2017; 2019; 2022; 2023; 2024; 2025

Spain is scheduled to compete at the 2017 World Aquatics Championships in Budapest, Hungary from 14 July to 30 July.

== Medalists ==
Medal	Name	Sport	Event	Date
Gold	Mireia Belmonte	Swimming	Women's 200 m butterfly	July 27
Silver	Ona Carbonell	Synchronized swimming	Women's solo technical routine	July 15
Silver	Ona Carbonell	Synchronized swimming	Women's solo free routine	July 19
Silver	Mireia Belmonte	Swimming	Women's 1500 m freestyle	July 25
Silver	Mireia Belmonte	Swimming	Women's 400 m medley	July 30
Silver	Spain women's national water polo team: Laura Ester; Marta Bach; Anni Espar; Beatriz Ortiz; Matilde Ortiz; Helena Lloret; Clara Espar; María del Pilar Peña; Judith Forca; Paula Crespí; Anna Gual; Paula Leitón; Sandra Domene	Water polo	Women's tournament	July 28

== Diving ==
Spain has entered 3 divers (three male).

Men

Athlete	Event	Preliminaries		Semifinals		Final	
Athlete	Event	Points	Rank	Points	Rank	Points	Rank
Alberto Arévalo	1 m springboard	333.05	23	—N/a		did not advance	
Nicolás García	1 m springboard	336.15	22	—N/a		did not advance	
Alberto Arévalo	3 m springboard	372.45	32	did not advance			
Nicolás García	3 m springboard	390.80	22	did not advance			
Nicolás García; Héctor García	3 m synchronized springboard	372.30	13	—N/a		did not advance	

== Open water swimming ==
Spain has entered three open water swimmers

Athlete	Event	Time	Rank
Antonio Arroyo	Men's 5 km	54:59.4	18
María de Valdés Álvarez	Women's 10 km	2:04:54.4	30
Paula Ruiz	Women's 5 km	1:00:49.1	13
Paula Ruiz	Women's 10 km	2:02:07.0	18

== Swimming ==
Spanish swimmers have achieved qualifying standards in the following events (up to a maximum of 2 swimmers in each event at the A-standard entry time, and 1 at the B-standard):

Men

Athlete	Event	Heat		Semifinal		Final	
Athlete	Event	Time	Rank	Time	Rank	Time	Rank
Antonio Arroyo	800 m freestyle	8:04.68	23	—N/a		did not advance	
Antonio Arroyo	1500 m freestyle	15:18.50	22	—N/a		did not advance	
Miguel Durán	200 m freestyle	1:50.34	46	did not advance			
Miguel Durán	400 m freestyle	3:51.28	21	—N/a		did not advance	
Hugo González	100 m backstroke	55.05	23	did not advance			
Hugo González	200 m backstroke	2:02.41	32	did not advance			
Hugo González	200 m individual medley	2:02.78	26	did not advance			
Joan Lluís Pons	200 m butterfly	1:59.41	26	did not advance			
Joan Lluís Pons	400 m individual medley	4:16.27	10	—N/a		did not advance	

Women

Athlete	Event	Heat		Semifinal		Final	
Athlete	Event	Time	Rank	Time	Rank	Time	Rank
Mireia Belmonte	400 m freestyle	4:09.55	10	—N/a		did not advance	
Mireia Belmonte	800 m freestyle	8:24.98	4 Q	—N/a		8:23.30	4
Mireia Belmonte	1500 m freestyle	16:05.37	2 Q	—N/a		15:50.89 NR	2nd place, silver medalist(s)
Mireia Belmonte	200 m butterfly	2:07.59	3 Q	2:06.71	3 Q	2:05.26	1st place, gold medalist(s)
Mireia Belmonte	200 m individual medley	2:13.82	20	did not advance			
Mireia Belmonte	400 m individual medley	4:35.29	2 Q	—N/a		4:32.17	2nd place, silver medalist(s)
Jimena Pérez	800 m freestyle	8:41.41	18	—N/a		did not advance	
Jimena Pérez	1500 m freestyle	16:21.45	9	—N/a		did not advance	
Jessica Vall	100 m breaststroke	1:06.85	6 Q	1:06.62	=6 Q	1:06.95	7
Jessica Vall	200 m breaststroke	2:24.41	4 Q	2:23.49	6 Q	2:23.29	8
África Zamorano	100 m backstroke	1:00.89	19	did not advance			
África Zamorano	200 m backstroke	2:09.70	10 Q	2:09.73	13	did not advance	

== Synchronized swimming ==
Spain's synchronized swimming team consisted of 13 athletes (1 male and 12 female).

Women

Athlete	Event	Preliminaries		Final	
Athlete	Event	Points	Rank	Points	Rank
Ona Carbonell	Solo technical routine	92.3893	2 Q	93.6534	2nd place, silver medalist(s)
Ona Carbonell	Solo free routine	94.1667	2 Q	95.0333	2nd place, silver medalist(s)
Ona Carbonell; Paula Ramírez; Sara Saldaña (R)	Duet technical routine	89.2965	5 Q	90.7507	5
Ona Carbonell; Paula Ramírez; Sara Saldaña (R)	Duet free routine	91.3667	5 Q	91.7333	5
Leyre Abadía; Ariadna Arisó (R); Berta Ferreras; Helena Jauma (R); María del Carmen Juárez; Meritxell Mas; Alisa Ozhogina; Paula Ramírez; Sara Saldaña; Blanca Toledano	Team technical routine	88.8044	6 Q	88.4687	6
Leyre Abadía; Ariadna Arisó (R); Berta Ferreras; Helena Jauma (R); María del Carmen Juárez; Meritxell Mas; Alisa Ozhogina; Paula Ramírez; Sara Saldaña; Blanca Toledano	Team free routine	89.9333	6 Q	90.7000	6
Leyre Abadía; Ariadna Arisó; Ona Carbonell (R); Julia Echeberría (R); Berta Ferreras; Helena Jauma; María del Carmen Juárez; Meritxell Mas; Alisa Ozhogina; Paula Ramírez; Sara Saldaña; Blanca Toledano	Free routine combination	90.2000	5 Q	90.6667	5

Mixed

Athlete	Event	Preliminaries		Final	
Athlete	Event	Points	Rank	Points	Rank
Berta Ferreras; Pau Ribes	Duet technical routine	83.4865	5 Q	84.3336	5
Berta Ferreras; Pau Ribes	Duet free routine	85.5000	5 Q	85.7333	5

Legend: (R) = Reserve Athlete

== Water polo ==
Spain qualified both a men's and women's teams.

=== Men's tournament ===
Team roster

- Daniel López Pinedo
- Alberto Munarriz Egaña
- Álvaro Granados Ortega
- Miguel del Toro
- Alejandro Bustos Sánchez
- Marc Minguell Alférez (C)
- Alberto Barroso Macarro
- Albert Español Lifante
- Roger Tahull Compte
- Francisco Fernández Miranda
- Blai Mallarach Güell
- Víctor Gutiérrez Santiago
- José Motos Martín

Group play

Pos	Team	Pld	W	D	L	GF	GA	GD	Pts	Qualification
1	Serbia	3	3	0	0	43	16	+27	6	Quarterfinals
2	Greece	3	2	0	1	32	20	+12	4	Playoffs
3	Spain	3	1	0	2	28	23	+5	2	Playoffs
4	South Africa	3	0	0	3	11	55	−44	0	

Source: Sportresult
Rules for classification: 1) points; 2) head-to-head points; 3) head-to-head goal difference; 4) head-to-head number of goals scored; 5) better result against higher placed team.

17 July 2017; 13:30	Report	Spain	7–8	Greece	Alfréd Hajós National Swimming Stadium, Budapest; Referees: Radoslaw Koryzna (POL), Péter Molnár (HUN)
17 July 2017; 13:30	Report	Score by quarters: 1–3, 2–2, 1–1, 3–2			Alfréd Hajós National Swimming Stadium, Budapest; Referees: Radoslaw Koryzna (POL), Péter Molnár (HUN)
17 July 2017; 13:30	Report	Mallarach 2	Goals	Fountoulis, Vlachopoulos 2	Alfréd Hajós National Swimming Stadium, Budapest; Referees: Radoslaw Koryzna (POL), Péter Molnár (HUN)

19 July 2017; 12:10	Report	Spain	5–11	Serbia	Alfréd Hajós National Swimming Stadium, Budapest; Referees: Adrian Alexandrescu (ROU), Mikhail Dykman (CAN)
19 July 2017; 12:10	Report	Score by quarters: 1–3, 0–2, 2–3, 2–3			Alfréd Hajós National Swimming Stadium, Budapest; Referees: Adrian Alexandrescu (ROU), Mikhail Dykman (CAN)
19 July 2017; 12:10	Report	Bustos 2	Goals	three players 2	Alfréd Hajós National Swimming Stadium, Budapest; Referees: Adrian Alexandrescu (ROU), Mikhail Dykman (CAN)

21 July 2017; 09:30	Report	Spain	16–4	South Africa	Alfréd Hajós National Swimming Stadium, Budapest; Referees: Ni Shiwei (CHN), Michael Brooks (NZL)
21 July 2017; 09:30	Report	Score by quarters: 3–2, 1–0, 6–1, 6–1			Alfréd Hajós National Swimming Stadium, Budapest; Referees: Ni Shiwei (CHN), Michael Brooks (NZL)
21 July 2017; 09:30	Report	three players 3	Goals	four players 1	Alfréd Hajós National Swimming Stadium, Budapest; Referees: Ni Shiwei (CHN), Michael Brooks (NZL)

Playoffs

23 July 2017; 22:00	Report	Spain	10–11	Russia	Alfréd Hajós National Swimming Stadium, Budapest; Referees: Adrian Alexandrescu (ROU), Vojin Putniković (SRB)
23 July 2017; 22:00	Report	Score by quarters: 2–3, 2–4, 3–3, 3–1			Alfréd Hajós National Swimming Stadium, Budapest; Referees: Adrian Alexandrescu (ROU), Vojin Putniković (SRB)
23 July 2017; 22:00	Report	Tahull 4	Goals	Lisunov, Merkulov 3	Alfréd Hajós National Swimming Stadium, Budapest; Referees: Adrian Alexandrescu (ROU), Vojin Putniković (SRB)

9th–12th place semifinals

25 July 2017; 13:30	Report	Kazakhstan	6–18	Spain	Alfréd Hajós National Swimming Stadium, Budapest; Referees: Mikhail Dykman (CAN), Stanko Ivanovski (MNE)
25 July 2017; 13:30	Report	Score by quarters: 0–4, 1–5, 1–3, 4–6			Alfréd Hajós National Swimming Stadium, Budapest; Referees: Mikhail Dykman (CAN), Stanko Ivanovski (MNE)
25 July 2017; 13:30	Report	Shakenov 4	Goals	Barroso 5	Alfréd Hajós National Swimming Stadium, Budapest; Referees: Mikhail Dykman (CAN), Stanko Ivanovski (MNE)

Ninth place game

27 July 2017; 12:00	Report	Japan	11–13	Spain	Alfréd Hajós National Swimming Stadium, Budapest; Referees: Stanko Ivanovski (MNE), Viktor Salnichenko (KAZ)
27 July 2017; 12:00	Report	Score by quarters: 2–1, 4–6, 3–4, 2–2			Alfréd Hajós National Swimming Stadium, Budapest; Referees: Stanko Ivanovski (MNE), Viktor Salnichenko (KAZ)
27 July 2017; 12:00	Report	Adachi, Okawa 3	Goals	Español 5	Alfréd Hajós National Swimming Stadium, Budapest; Referees: Stanko Ivanovski (MNE), Viktor Salnichenko (KAZ)

=== Women's tournament ===
Team roster

- Laura Ester Ramos
- Marta Bach Pascual
- Anna Espar Llaquet
- Beatriz Ortiz Muñoz
- Matilde Ortiz Reyes
- Helena Lloret Gómez
- Clara Espar Llaquet
- María del Pilar Peña Carrasco (C)
- Judith Forca Ariza
- Paula Crespí Barriga
- Anna Gual Rovirosa
- Paula Leitón Arrones
- Sandra Domene Pérez

Group play

Pos	Team	Pld	W	D	L	GF	GA	GD	Pts	Qualification
1	United States	3	3	0	0	58	17	+41	6	Quarterfinals
2	Spain	3	2	0	1	35	17	+18	4	Playoffs
3	New Zealand	3	1	0	2	17	38	−21	2	Playoffs
4	South Africa	3	0	0	3	11	49	−38	0	

Updated to match(es) played on 20 July 2017. Source: Sportresult
Rules for classification: 1) points; 2) head-to-head points; 3) head-to-head goal difference; 4) head-to-head number of goals scored; 5) Goal difference.

16 July 2017; 12:10	Report	New Zealand	2–10	Spain	Alfréd Hajós National Swimming Stadium, Budapest; Referees: Viktor Salnichenko (KAZ), Péter Molnár (HUN)
16 July 2017; 12:10	Report	Score by quarters: 0–3, 1–1, 0–2, 1–4			Alfréd Hajós National Swimming Stadium, Budapest; Referees: Viktor Salnichenko (KAZ), Péter Molnár (HUN)
16 July 2017; 12:10	Report	Lopes da Silva, Mason 1	Goals	Leitón 3	Alfréd Hajós National Swimming Stadium, Budapest; Referees: Viktor Salnichenko (KAZ), Péter Molnár (HUN)

18 July 2017; 09:30	Report	United States	12–8	Spain	Alfréd Hajós National Swimming Stadium, Budapest; Referees: Diana Dutilh-Dumas (NED), Sergey Naumov (RUS)
18 July 2017; 09:30	Report	Score by quarters: 6–1, 1–2, 2–2, 3–3			Alfréd Hajós National Swimming Stadium, Budapest; Referees: Diana Dutilh-Dumas (NED), Sergey Naumov (RUS)
18 July 2017; 09:30	Report	Musselman, J. Neushul 3	Goals	Espar 3	Alfréd Hajós National Swimming Stadium, Budapest; Referees: Diana Dutilh-Dumas (NED), Sergey Naumov (RUS)

20 July 2017; 21:30	Report	South Africa	3–17	Spain	Alfréd Hajós National Swimming Stadium, Budapest; Referees: Diana Dutilh-Dumas (NED), Viktor Salnichenko (KAZ)
20 July 2017; 21:30	Report	Score by quarters: 1–4, 0–6, 1–2, 1–5			Alfréd Hajós National Swimming Stadium, Budapest; Referees: Diana Dutilh-Dumas (NED), Viktor Salnichenko (KAZ)
20 July 2017; 21:30	Report	three players 1	Goals	Forca 5	Alfréd Hajós National Swimming Stadium, Budapest; Referees: Diana Dutilh-Dumas (NED), Viktor Salnichenko (KAZ)

Playoffs

22 July 2017; 19:00	Report	China	5–13	Spain	Alfréd Hajós National Swimming Stadium, Budapest; Referees: Diana Dutilh-Dumas (NED), Steven Rotsart (USA)
22 July 2017; 19:00	Report	Score by quarters: 2–1, 1–4, 1–5, 1–3			Alfréd Hajós National Swimming Stadium, Budapest; Referees: Diana Dutilh-Dumas (NED), Steven Rotsart (USA)
22 July 2017; 19:00	Report	Zhao 2	Goals	B. Ortiz 4	Alfréd Hajós National Swimming Stadium, Budapest; Referees: Diana Dutilh-Dumas (NED), Steven Rotsart (USA)

Quarterfinals

24 July 2017; 22:00	Report	Greece	10–10 ^{(2–4 PSO)} (PSO)	Spain	Alfréd Hajós National Swimming Stadium, Budapest; Referees: Sergey Naumov (RUS), Vojin Putniković (SRB)
24 July 2017; 22:00	Report	Score by quarters: 3–2, 2–2, 2–2, 3–4 PSO: 2–4			Alfréd Hajós National Swimming Stadium, Budapest; Referees: Sergey Naumov (RUS), Vojin Putniković (SRB)
24 July 2017; 22:00	Report	Kotsia 3	Goals	B. Ortiz 4	Alfréd Hajós National Swimming Stadium, Budapest; Referees: Sergey Naumov (RUS), Vojin Putniković (SRB)

Semifinals

26 July 2017; 22:00	Report	Canada	10–12	Spain	Alfréd Hajós National Swimming Stadium, Budapest; Referees: Georgios Stavridis (GRE), Alessandro Severo (ITA)
26 July 2017; 22:00	Report	Score by quarters: 2–4, 2–3, 2–2, 4–3			Alfréd Hajós National Swimming Stadium, Budapest; Referees: Georgios Stavridis (GRE), Alessandro Severo (ITA)
26 July 2017; 22:00	Report	Christmas, Fournier 3	Goals	Gual 5	Alfréd Hajós National Swimming Stadium, Budapest; Referees: Georgios Stavridis (GRE), Alessandro Severo (ITA)

Final

28 July 2017; 20:30	Report	United States	13–6	Spain	Alfréd Hajós National Swimming Stadium, Budapest; Referees: Diana Dutilh-Dumas (NED), Daniel Flahive (AUS)
28 July 2017; 20:30	Report	Score by quarters: 2–1, 3–2, 5–2, 3–1			Alfréd Hajós National Swimming Stadium, Budapest; Referees: Diana Dutilh-Dumas (NED), Daniel Flahive (AUS)
28 July 2017; 20:30	Report	K. Neushul 4	Goals	Espar 3	Alfréd Hajós National Swimming Stadium, Budapest; Referees: Diana Dutilh-Dumas (NED), Daniel Flahive (AUS)
