= Argentina at the 2011 World Aquatics Championships =

- Flag of Argentina
- World Aquatics code: ARG
- National federation: Confederación Argentina de Deportes Acuáticos
- Website: www.cadda.org.ar

in Shanghai, China
- Competitors: 13 in 3 sports
- Medals: Gold 0 Silver 0 Bronze 0 Total 0

World Aquatics Championships appearances
- 1973; 1975; 1978; 1982; 1986; 1991; 1994; 1998; 2001; 2003; 2005; 2007; 2009; 2011; 2013; 2015; 2017; 2019; 2022; 2023; 2024; 2025

Argentina competed at the 2011 World Aquatics Championships in Shanghai, China between 16 and 31 July.

== Open water swimming ==
Men

Athlete	Event	Final	
Athlete	Event	Time	Position
Damian Balum	Men's 10km	1:59:44.1	40
Guillermo Bertola	Men's 10km	1:54:54.9	18
Guillermo Bertola	Men's 25km	5:14:29.9	13
Gabriel Villagoiz	Men's 25km	5:37:25.9	18

Women

Athlete	Event	Final	
Athlete	Event	Time	Position
Cecilia Biagioli	Women's 10km	2:02:12.0	5
Cecilia Biagioli	Women's 25km	5:29:58.7	10

Mixed

Athlete	Event	Final	
Athlete	Event	Time	Position
Guillermo Bertola; Cecilia Biagioli; Gabriel Villagoiz	Team	1:01:34.2	9

== Swimming ==
Argentina qualified 7 swimmers.

Men

Athlete	Event	Heats		Semifinals		Final	
Athlete	Event	Time	Rank	Time	Rank	Time	Rank
Matias Aguilera	Men's 100m Freestyle	51.62	50	did not advance			
Juan Martin Pereyra	Men's 400m Freestyle	3:51.03	20			did not advance	
Juan Martin Pereyra	Men's 800m Freestyle	7:59.06	16			did not advance	
Juan Martin Pereyra	Men's 1500m Freestyle	15:21.92	17			did not advance	
Federico Grabich	Men's 50m Backstroke	26.13	25	did not advance			
Federico Grabich	Men's 100m Backstroke	55.93	37	did not advance			

Women

Athlete	Event	Heats		Semifinals		Final	
Athlete	Event	Time	Rank	Time	Rank	Time	Rank
Virginia Bardach	Women's 400m Freestyle	4:18.57	26			did not advance	
Cecilia Biagioli	Women's 800m Freestyle	8:44.01	22			did not advance	
Cecilia Biagioli	Women's 1500m Freestyle	DNS				did not advance	
Cecilia Bertoncello	Women's 50m Backstroke	29.73	37	did not advance			
Georgina Bardach	Women's 400m IM	4:48.09	22			did not advance	

== Synchronised swimming ==
Argentina has qualified 3 athletes in synchronized swimming.

Women

Athlete	Event	Preliminary		Final	
Athlete	Event	Points	Rank	Points	Rank
Etel Sánchez	Solo Technical Routine	78.400	17	did not advance	
Etel Sánchez	Solo Free Routine	78.840	18	did not advance	
Etel Sánchez; Sofía Sánchez	Duet Technical Routine	79.200	24	did not advance	
Etel Sánchez; Sofía Sánchez	Duet Free Routine	80.110	22	did not advance	

Reserve

- Lucina Simon
