= Diving at the 2017 World Aquatics Championships – Men's 1 metre springboard =

Sports championship

Men's 1 metre springboard at the 2017 World Aquatics Championships
- Venue: Danube Arena
- Location: Budapest, Hungary
- Dates: 14 July (preliminaries); 16 July (final)
- Competitors: 51 from 31 nations
- Winning points: 448.40

Medalists
gold medal	Peng Jianfeng	China
silver medal	He Chao	China
bronze medal	Giovanni Tocci	Italy

The Men's 1 metre springboard competition at the 2017 World Championships was held on 14 and 16 July 2017.

== Results ==
The preliminary round was started on 14 July at 11:00. The final was held on 16 July at 15:30.

Green denotes finalists

Rank	Diver	Nationality	Preliminary		Final	
Rank	Diver	Nationality	Points	Rank	Points	Rank
1st place, gold medalist(s)	Peng Jianfeng	China	435.15	1	448.40	1
2nd place, silver medalist(s)	He Chao	China	431.35	2	447.20	2
3rd place, bronze medalist(s)	Giovanni Tocci	Italy	410.60	3	444.25	3
4	Patrick Hausding	Germany	403.80	4	439.25	4
5	Michael Hixon	United States	384.80	5	439.15	5
6	Oleh Kolodiy	Ukraine	374.80	6	419.05	6
7	Steele Johnson	United States	360.15	12	392.50	7
8	Jahir Ocampo	Mexico	361.05	11	379.00	8
9	James Heatly	Great Britain	364.00	9	374.50	9
10	Ross Haslam	Great Britain	367.60	8	357.90	10
11	Ilia Molchanov	Russia	373.70	7	351.90	11
12	Kim Yeong-nam	South Korea	361.15	10	347.10	12
13	Nikita Shleikher	Russia	360.05	13	Did not advance	
13	Woo Ha-ram	South Korea	360.05	13	Did not advance	
15	Matthieu Rosset	France	358.80	15	Did not advance	
16	Illya Kvasha	Ukraine	349.20	16	Did not advance	
17	Constantin Blaha	Austria	348.20	17	Did not advance	
18	Guillaume Dutoit	Switzerland	346.80	18	Did not advance	
19	Tommaso Rinaldi	Italy	340.15	19	Did not advance	
20	Daniel Restrepo	Colombia	339.50	20	Did not advance	
21	Andrzej Rzeszutek	Poland	336.60	21	Did not advance	
22	Nicolás García	Spain	336.15	22	Did not advance	
23	Alberto Arevalo	Spain	333.05	23	Did not advance	
24	Kevin Chávez	Australia	330.10	24	Did not advance	
25	Ooi Tze Liang	Malaysia	325.70	25	Did not advance	
26	James Connor	Australia	323.40	26	Did not advance	
27	Adán Zúñiga	Mexico	322.80	27	Did not advance	
28	Jonathan Suckow	Switzerland	317.30	28	Did not advance	
29	Mohab Mohymen	Egypt	317.05	29	Did not advance	
30	Ahmad Azman	Malaysia	313.00	30	Did not advance	
31	Lee Mark Han Ming	Singapore	312.30	31	Did not advance	
32	Yona Knight-Wisdom	Jamaica	310.25	32	Did not advance	
33	Ian Matos	Brazil	303.30	33	Did not advance	
34	Alejandro Arias	Colombia	302.50	34	Did not advance	
35	Lou Massenberg	Germany	300.85	35	Did not advance	
36	Juho Junttila	Finland	296.15	36	Did not advance	
37	Timothy Lee	Singapore	289.50	37	Did not advance	
38	Juraj Melša	Croatia	289.30	38	Did not advance	
39	Frandiel Gómez	Dominican Republic	287.35	39	Did not advance	
40	Rafael Quintero	Puerto Rico	285.90	40	Did not advance	
41	Liam Stone	New Zealand	282.65	41	Did not advance	
42	Carlos Escalona	Cuba	282.20	42	Did not advance	
43	Diego Carquin	Chile	265.95	43	Did not advance	
44	Botond Bóta	Hungary	265.45	44	Did not advance	
45	Ammar Hassan	Egypt	260.65	45	Did not advance	
46	Donato Neglia	Chile	256.80	46	Did not advance	
47	Jouni Kallunki	Finland	245.10	47	Did not advance	
48	Joey van Etten	Netherlands	243.95	48	Did not advance	
49	Ábel Ligárt	Hungary	238.30	49	Did not advance	
50	Arturo Valdes	Cuba	211.40	50	Did not advance	
51	Mikita Tkachou	Belarus	206.40	51	Did not advance	
