= Singapore at the 2017 World Aquatics Championships =

- Flag of Singapore
- FINA code: SGP
- National federation: Singapore Swimming Association
- Website: www.swimming.org.sg

in Budapest, Hungary
- Competitors: 14 in 3 sports
- Medals Ranked 26th: Gold 0 Silver 0 Bronze 1 Total 1

World Aquatics Championships appearances
- 1973; 1975; 1978; 1982; 1986; 1991; 1994; 1998; 2001; 2003; 2005; 2007; 2009; 2011; 2013; 2015; 2017; 2019; 2022; 2023; 2024

Singapore competed at the 2017 World Aquatics Championships in Budapest, Hungary from 14 July to 30 July.

== Medalists ==
Medal	Name	Sport	Event	Date
Bronze	Joseph Schooling	Swimming	Men's 100 m butterfly	July 29

== Diving ==
Singapore has entered 4 divers (three male and one female).

Men

Athlete	Event	Preliminaries		Semifinals		Final	
Athlete	Event	Points	Rank	Points	Rank	Points	Rank
Mark Lee	1 m springboard	312.30	31	—		did not advance	
Timothy Lee	1 m springboard	289.50	37	—		did not advance	
Mark Lee	3 m springboard	295.65	45	did not advance			
Timothy Lee	3 m springboard	325.65	40	did not advance			
Jonathan Chan	10 m platform	328.00	33	did not advance			
Mark Lee; Timothy Lee	3 m synchronized springboard	335.52	17	—		did not advance	

Women

Athlete	Event	Preliminaries		Semifinals		Final	
Athlete	Event	Points	Rank	Points	Rank	Points	Rank
Shen-Yan Freida Lim	10 m platform	237.10	34	did not advance			

Mixed

Athlete	Event	Final	
Athlete	Event	Points	Rank
Shen-Yan Freida Lim; Jonathan Chan	10 m synchronized platform	250.68	15
Shen-Yan Freida Lim; Jonathan Chan	Team	302.85	14

== Swimming ==
Singaporean swimmers have achieved qualifying standards in the following events (up to a maximum of 2 swimmers in each event at the A-standard entry time, and 1 at the B-standard):

Athlete	Event	Heat		Semifinal		Final	
Athlete	Event	Time	Rank	Time	Rank	Time	Rank
Quah Zheng Wen	Men's 50 m backstroke	25.58	30	did not advance			
Quah Zheng Wen	Men's 100 m backstroke	54.68	18	did not advance			
Quah Zheng Wen	Men's 200 m backstroke	1:59.49 NR	24	did not advance			
Quah Zheng Wen	Men's 100 m butterfly	52.13	18	did not advance			
Quah Zheng Wen	Men's 200 m butterfly	1:56.76	18	did not advance			
Joseph Schooling	Men's 100 m freestyle	48.86	17	did not advance			
Joseph Schooling	Men's 50 m butterfly	23.05 AS	3 Q	22.93 AS	5 Q	22.95	5
Joseph Schooling	Men's 100 m butterfly	51.21	4 Q	50.78	4 Q	50.83	3rd place, bronze medalist(s)

== Synchronized swimming ==
Singapore's synchronized swimming team consisted of 8 athletes (8 female).

Women

Athlete	Event	Preliminaries		Final	
Athlete	Event	Points	Rank	Points	Rank
Debbie Soh	Solo technical routine	72.9689	20	did not advance	
Debbie Soh	Solo free routine	75.6000	21	did not advance	
Debbie Soh; Miya Yong	Duet technical routine	74.7393	28	did not advance	
Debbie Soh; Miya Yong	Duet free routine	76.0000	28	did not advance	
Hannah Chiang; Gwyneth Goh; Christine Mok; Ariel Sng; Debbie Soh; Vivien Tai; Rachel Thean; Miya Yong	Team technical routine	73.6012	19	did not advance	
Hannah Chiang; Gwyneth Goh; Christine Mok; Ariel Sng; Debbie Soh; Vivien Tai; Rachel Thean; Miya Yong	Team free routine	74.9000	20	did not advance	
