= Hou Yawen =

Chinese swimmer

Personal information
- Nationality: Chinese
- Born: 9 September 1998 (age 27) Dalian, Liaoning, China
- Height: 1.81 m (5 ft 11 in)

Sport
- Sport: Swimming
Medal record
Women's swimming
Representing China
Asian Championships
Gold medal – first place	2016 Tokyo	800 m freestyle

Hou Yawen (Chinese: 侯雅雯; born 9 September 1998) is a Chinese swimmer. She competed in the women's 800 metre freestyle event at the 2016 Summer Olympics.
