= Julia Arino =

Argentine swimmer

Personal information
- Nationality: Argentine
- Born: 31 July 1991 (age 34)

Sport
- Sport: Swimming

Julia Arino (born 31 July 1991) is an Argentine swimmer. In 2019, she represented Argentina at the 2019 World Aquatics Championships held in Gwangju, South Korea. She competed in the women's 800 metre freestyle and women's 1500 metre freestyle events. In both events she did not advance to compete in the final. She also competed in the women's 5 km and women's 10 km events. In the 5 km event she finished in 26th place and in the 10 km event she finished in 32nd place.
