= Zu Lijun =

Chinese swimmer (born 1989)

Personal information
- National team: China
- Born: November 26, 1989 (age 36) Zibo, Shandong
- Height: 1.88 m (6 ft 2 in)
- Weight: 87 kg (192 lb)

Sport
- Sport: Swimming
- Strokes: Freestyle

Zu Lijun (born 26 November 1989) is a Chinese competitive swimmer who specialises in long-distance open water events.

== Career ==
In June 2016, Zu won the Olympic qualifier race in Setúbal, Portugal, which qualified him for the Olympic marathon.

Zu finished in 4th place in the 10 km open water marathon at the 2016 Summer Olympics in Rio de Janeiro, 2.2 seconds behind gold medalist Ferry Weertman. He recorded the same time as bronze medalist Marc-Antoine Olivier of France.
