= 2017 World Aquatics Championships =

17th FINA World Championships

17th FINA World Championships
- Host city: Budapest, Hungary
- Date: 14–30 July 2017
- Venue(s): Danube Arena, Alfréd Hajós National Swimming Stadium, Lake Balaton
- Nations participating: 182
- Athletes participating: 2,360
- Officially opened by: János Áder
- Officially closed by: Julio Maglione
- Website: http://www.fina-budapest2017.com/en/home

The 17th FINA World Championships (Hungarian: 2017-es úszó-világbajnokság) were held in Budapest, Hungary from 14 to 30 July 2017.

== Host selection ==
On 15 July 2011, at the biennial General Congress of FINA in Shanghai, the host city of the 2017 World Aquatics Championships, Guadalajara, Mexico was announced as the winning bid. Kazan, Russia was awarded the 2015 Championships in the same vote, whereas the rival bid from Hong Kong, China was left unrewarded. Guangzhou (China) and Montreal (Canada) had withdrawn their bids shortly before the vote.

In February 2015, Mexico withdrew from hosting the world championships, saying they could not afford the $100 million price tag for hosting the multi-sport aquatic event. FINA Bureau members held a vote by email for a replacement host city, with the majority voting in favour of bringing forward Budapest as host city for 2017 (originally announced as the 2021 host city), and re-running the bidding process for the 2021 edition for the Championships. On 11 March 2015, it was announced that Budapest would host the 2017 Championships.

== Symbols ==
The logo of 2017 World Aquatics Championships was inspired by water and Hungarian folk art. The White water roses Lali (male) and Lili (female) in swimming costumes were selected as mascots of the championships. Slogan of the championships was Water, Wonder, Welcome.

The Hungarian National Bank issued a commemorative version of the 50 Ft circulation coin on the occasion of the 17th FINA World Championships to be held in Hungary. and Hungarian Post produced 200,000 stamps and the commemorative booklet with envelope and stamp of first day mail cancellation.

== Venues ==
The two main competition venues are located in Budapest: Danube Arena, a brand-new indoor swimming pool complex for swimming and diving on the eastern bank of the Danube just north of Margaret Island, and the existing Alfréd Hajós National Swimming Stadium, on Margaret Island itself, for water polo. Open water swimming events are held at Lake Balaton. High diving and synchronised swimming are held at temporary venues in Budapest.

== Schedule ==
A total of 75 Medal events are held across six disciplines.

All dates are CEST (UTC+2)

●	Opening ceremony	●	Other competitions	●	Finals	●	Closing ceremony	M	Men's matches	W	Women's matches

July	14	15	16	17	18	19	20	21	22	23	24	25	26	27	28	29	30	Total
Ceremonies	●																●	75
Swimming										4	4	5	5	5	5	6	8	42
Open water swimming		1	1		1	1	1	2										7
Synchronized swimming	●	1	1	1	1	1	1	1	2									9
Diving	●	3	2	2	1	1	1	1	2									13
High diving															●	1	1	2
Water polo			W	M	W	M	W	M	W	M	W	M	W	M	W	M		2

== Medal table ==
* Host nation

Rank	Nation	Gold	Silver	Bronze	Total
1	United States	21	12	13	46
2	China	12	12	6	30
3	Russia	11	6	8	25
4	France	6	1	2	9
5	Great Britain	5	3	3	11
6	Italy	4	3	9	16
7	Australia	3	5	4	12
8	Sweden	3	1	0	4
9	Hungary*	2	5	2	9
10	Brazil	2	4	2	8
11	Spain	1	5	0	6
12	Netherlands	1	4	1	6
13	Canada	1	1	5	7
14	Malaysia	1	0	1	2
14	South Africa	1	0	1	2
16	Croatia	1	0	0	1
17	Japan	0	4	5	9
18	Ukraine	0	2	7	9
19	Germany	0	2	1	3
20	Mexico	0	2	0	2
21	North Korea	0	1	1	2
22	Czech Republic	0	1	0	1
22	Ecuador	0	1	0	1
22	Poland	0	1	0	1
25	Belarus	0	0	2	2
26	Denmark	0	0	1	1
26	Egypt	0	0	1	1
26	Serbia	0	0	1	1
26	Singapore	0	0	1	1
Totals (29 entries)		75	76	77	228

== Participating nations ==
- Afghanistan (2)
- Albania (4)
- Algeria (4)
- American Samoa (1)
- Andorra (2)
- Angola (5)
- Antigua and Barbuda (4)
- Argentina (13)
- Armenia (7)
- Aruba (5)
- Australia (83)
- Austria (9)
- Azerbaijan (3)
- Bahamas (2)
- Bahrain (2)
- Bangladesh (3)
- Barbados (4)
- Belarus (28)
- Belgium (4)
- Benin (3)
- Bolivia (6)
- Bosnia and Herzegovina (3)
- Botswana (3)
- Brazil (61)
- British Virgin Islands (1)
- Brunei (2)
- Bulgaria (8)
- Burkina Faso (3)
- Burundi (3)
- Cambodia (3)
- Canada (83)
- Cayman Islands (1)
- Central African Republic (1)
- Chile (8)
- China (93)
- Chinese Taipei (9)
- Colombia (21)
- Comoros (3)
- Cook Islands (2)
- Costa Rica (16)
- Ivory Coast (4)
- Croatia (29)
- Cuba (13)
- Curaçao (3)
- Cyprus (4)
- Czech Republic (21)
- Denmark (15)
- Djibouti (2)
- Dominican Republic (5)
- Ecuador (8)
- Egypt (35)
- El Salvador (4)
- Estonia (8)
- Faroe Islands (4)
- Fiji (3)
- Finland (11)
- Independent FINA Athletes (2)
- France (59)
- The Gambia (2)
- Georgia (6)
- Germany (51)
- Ghana (4)
- Great Britain (51)
- Greece (54)
- Grenada (3)
- Guam (4)
- Guatemala (6)
- Guinea (3)
- Guyana (3)
- Haiti (3)
- Honduras (4)
- Hong Kong (13)
- Hungary (81) (Host)
- Iceland (3)
- India (6)
- Indonesia (9)
- Iran (1)
- Iraq (3)
- Ireland (7)
- Israel (32)
- Italy (89)
- Jamaica (3)
- Japan (77)
- Jordan (6)
- Kazakhstan (46)
- Kenya (4)
- North Korea (17)
- South Korea (26)
- Kosovo (4)
- Kyrgyzstan (4)
- Laos (3)
- Latvia (7)
- Lebanon (4)
- Libya (2)
- Liechtenstein (4)
- Lithuania (11)
- Luxembourg (7)
- Macau (20)
- Macedonia (2)
- Madagascar (4)
- Malawi (3)
- Malaysia (11)
- Maldives (4)
- Mali (3)
- Malta (3)
- Marshall Islands (3)
- Mauritius (3)
- Mexico (46)
- Federated States of Micronesia (3)
- Moldova (4)
- Monaco (2)
- Mongolia (4)
- Montenegro (16)
- Morocco (3)
- Mozambique (4)
- Namibia (5)
- Nepal (4)
- Netherlands (39)
- New Zealand (30)
- Nicaragua (3)
- Niger (3)
- Nigeria (3)
- Northern Mariana Islands (4)
- Norway (3)
- Oman (1)
- Pakistan (2)
- Palau (3)
- Palestine (3)
- Panama (6)
- Papua New Guinea (2)
- Paraguay (6)
- Peru (3)
- Philippines (7)
- Poland (27)
- Portugal (12)
- Puerto Rico (4)
- Qatar (2)
- Romania (6)
- Russia (91)
- Rwanda (2)
- Saint Lucia (3)
- Saint Vincent and the Grenadines (2)
- Samoa (3)
- Senegal (6)
- Serbia (28)
- Seychelles (4)
- Sierra Leone (3)
- Singapore (14)
- Slovakia (21)
- Slovenia (7)
- South Africa (60)
- Spain (51)
- Sri Lanka (3)
- Suriname (3)
- Suspended Member Federation (2)
- Swaziland (3)
- Sweden (11)
- Switzerland (23)
- Syria (4)
- Tajikistan (4)
- Tanzania (3)
- Thailand (4)
- Timor-Leste (1)
- Togo (2)
- Tonga (3)
- Trinidad and Tobago (2)
- Tunisia (3)
- Turkey (6)
- Turkmenistan (1)
- Uganda (3)
- Ukraine (39)
- United Arab Emirates (1)
- United States (116)
- Uruguay (4)
- Uzbekistan (17)
- Venezuela (15)
- Vietnam (6)
- Virgin Islands (2)
- Yemen (3)
- Zambia (3)
- Zimbabwe (4)

== Media coverage ==
In the United States, NBCUniversal holds rights to the event. Events shall be televised on NBC, NBCSN, and the Olympic Channel. In the UK, the championships have been shown on the BBC Red Button and BBC Two.
