= Iván Enderica =

Ecuadorian swimmer

Personal information
- Full name: Ivan Alejandro Enderica Ochoa
- Born: October 28, 1991 (age 34) Cuenca, Ecuador

Sport
- Sport: Swimming

Ivan Alejandro Enderica Ochoa (born 28 October 1991) is an Ecuadorian professional swimmer, specialising in open water swimming. He competed at the 2012 Summer Olympics, finishing in 21st in the 10 km open water marathon.

He started swimming at 5, following in the footsteps of his older brother Gabriel, and began to train under his first coach, Rafael Maldonado, when he was eight. He took up open water swimming in 2009.
