= Diving at the 2017 World Aquatics Championships – Women's 10 metre platform =

Women's 10 metre platform at the 2017 World Aquatics Championships
- Venue: Danube Arena
- Location: Budapest, Hungary
- Dates: 18 July (preliminaries and semifinal); 19 July (final)
- Competitors: 37 from 23 nations
- Winning points: 397.50

Medalists
gold medal	Cheong Jun Hoong	Malaysia
silver medal	Si Yajie	China
bronze medal	Ren Qian	China

The Women's 10 metre platform competition at the 2017 World Championships was held on 18 and 19 July 2017.

== Results ==
The preliminary round was started on 18 July at 10:00. The semifinals were held on 18 July at 15:30. The final was started on 19 July at 18:30.

Green denotes finalists

Blue denotes semifinalists

Rank	Diver	Nationality	Preliminary		Semifinal		Final	
Rank	Diver	Nationality	Points	Rank	Points	Rank	Points	Rank
1st place, gold medalist(s)	Cheong Jun Hoong	Malaysia	316.70	9	325.50	7	397.50	1
2nd place, silver medalist(s)	Si Yajie	China	359.25	3	382.80	1	396.00	2
3rd place, bronze medalist(s)	Ren Qian	China	376.65	1	367.50	2	391.95	3
4	Kim Mi-rae	North Korea	335.25	6	346.00	5	385.55	4
5	Melissa Wu	Australia	360.30	2	318.70	11	370.20	5
6	Kim Kuk-hyang	North Korea	351.20	4	360.85	3	360.00	6
7	Minami Itahashi	Japan	304.00	15	313.70	12	357.85	7
8	Meaghan Benfeito	Canada	339.75	5	355.15	4	331.40	8
9	Pandelela Rinong	Malaysia	306.00	13	322.75	8	322.40	9
10	Olivia Chamandy	Canada	299.10	17	320.55	10	307.15	10
11	Jessica Parratto	United States	306.85	12	322.75	8	302.35	11
12	Carolina Murillo	Colombia	321.55	7	325.75	6	283.35	12
13	Maria Kurjo	Germany	304.50	14	306.30	13	did not advance	
14	Christina Wassen	Germany	303.25	16	299.40	14	did not advance	
15	Gabriela Agúndez	Mexico	310.95	11	297.35	15	did not advance	
16	Robyn Birch	Great Britain	311.60	10	294.00	16	did not advance	
17	Cho Eun-bi	South Korea	297.95	18	292.10	17	did not advance	
18	Taneka Kovchenko	Australia	318.50	8	282.45	18	did not advance	
19	Laura Marino	France	291.90	19	did not advance			
20	Anna Chuinyshena	Russia	287.05	20	did not advance			
21	Celine van Duijn	Netherlands	285.10	21	did not advance			
22	Yulia Timoshinina	Russia	281.75	22	did not advance			
23	Lois Toulson	Great Britain	278.60	23	did not advance			
24	Nana Sasaki	Japan	274.80	24	did not advance			
25	Tuti García	Cuba	272.60	25	did not advance			
26	Sofiia Lyskun	Ukraine	270.45	26	did not advance			
27	Delaney Schnell	United States	268.05	27	did not advance			
28	Villő Kormos	Hungary	265.15	28	did not advance			
29	Giovanna Pedroso	Brazil	258.40	29	did not advance			
30	Ganna Krasnoshlyk	Ukraine	253.50	30	did not advance			
31	María Betancourt	Venezuela	247.85	31	did not advance			
32	Montserrat Gutiérrez	Mexico	247.05	32	did not advance			
33	Kim Su-ji	South Korea	242.10	33	did not advance			
34	Lim Shen-Yan Freida	Singapore	237.10	34	did not advance			
35	Jaimee Gundry	South Africa	230.60	35	did not advance			
36	Maha Abdelsalam	Egypt	229.30	36	did not advance			
37	Ingrid Oliveira	Brazil	228.00	37	did not advance			
