= Diving at the 2017 World Aquatics Championships – Men's 10 metre platform =

Men's 10 metre platform at the 2017 World Aquatics Championships
- Venue: Danube Arena
- Location: Budapest, Hungary
- Dates: 21 July (preliminaries and semifinal); 22 July (final)
- Competitors: 42 from 26 nations
- Winning points: 590.95

Medalists
| gold medal | Tom Daley | Great Britain |
| silver medal | Chen Aisen | China |
| bronze medal | Yang Jian | China |

The Men's 10 metre platform competition at the 2017 World Championships was held on 21 and 22 July 2017.

== Results ==
The preliminary round was started on 21 July at 10:00. The semifinal was held on 21 July at 15:30. The final was held on 22 July at 17:00.

Green denotes finalists

Blue denotes semifinalists

| Rank | Diver | Nationality | Preliminary | | Semifinal | | Final | |
| Rank | Diver | Nationality | Points | Rank | Points | Rank | Points | Rank |
|---|---|---|---|---|---|---|---|---|
| 1st place, gold medalist(s) | Tom Daley | Great Britain | 515.10 | 3 | 498.65 | 2 | 590.95 | 1 |
| 2nd place, silver medalist(s) | Chen Aisen | China | 553.50 | 1 | 488.55 | 3 | 585.25 | 2 |
| 3rd place, bronze medalist(s) | Yang Jian | China | 521.65 | 2 | 441.75 | 11 | 565.15 | 3 |
| 4 | Aleksandr Bondar | Russia | 436.30 | 10 | 509.10 | 1 | 484.80 | 4 |
| 5 | Maksym Dolhov | Ukraine | 432.50 | 11 | 413.55 | 12 | 484.70 | 5 |
| 6 | David Dinsmore | United States | 429.95 | 12 | 483.10 | 4 | 479.75 | 6 |
| 7 | Benjamin Auffret | France | 406.80 | 17 | 467.70 | 7 | 469.35 | 7 |
| 8 | Viktor Minibaev | Russia | 466.30 | 5 | 463.40 | 8 | 463.60 | 8 |
| 9 | Randal Willars Valdez | Mexico | 441.85 | 8 | 463.25 | 9 | 452.35 | 9 |
| 10 | Woo Ha-ram | South Korea | 441.30 | 9 | 442.60 | 10 | 435.60 | 10 |
| 11 | Ri Hyon-ju | North Korea | 488.70 | 4 | 468.80 | 6 | 434.85 | 11 |
| 12 | Matty Lee | Great Britain | 445.40 | 7 | 472.35 | 5 | 423.55 | 12 |
| 13 | Domonic Bedggood | Australia | 450.30 | 6 | 404.45 | 13 | did not advance | |
| 14 | Timo Barthel | Germany | 413.90 | 14 | 387.05 | 14 | did not advance | |
| 15 | Vladimir Barbu | Italy | 404.95 | 18 | 380.30 | 15 | did not advance | |
| 16 | Andrés Villarreal | Mexico | 414.55 | 13 | 379.95 | 16 | did not advance | |
| 17 | Jesús Liranzo | Venezuela | 407.55 | 16 | 373.05 | 17 | did not advance | |
| 18 | Declan Stacey | Australia | 409.45 | 15 | 305.00 | 18 | did not advance | |
| 19 | Vadim Kaptur | Belarus | 396.20 | 19 | did not advance | | | |
| 20 | Vincent Riendeau | Canada | 389.25 | 20 | did not advance | | | |
| 21 | Ethan Pitman | Canada | 386.50 | 21 | did not advance | | | |
| 22 | Vladimir Harutyunyan | Armenia | 375.50 | 22 | did not advance | | | |
| 23 | Florian Fandler | Germany | 375.05 | 23 | did not advance | | | |
| 24 | Kim Yeong-nam | South Korea | 361.10 | 24 | did not advance | | | |
| 25 | Hyon Il-myong | North Korea | 357.20 | 25 | did not advance | | | |
| 26 | Jordan Windle | United States | 351.75 | 26 | did not advance | | | |
| 27 | Krisztián Somhegyi | Hungary | 349.85 | 27 | did not advance | | | |
| 28 | Kazuki Murakami | Japan | 349.70 | 28 | did not advance | | | |
| 29 | Isaac Souza | Brazil | 348.90 | 29 | did not advance | | | |
| 30 | Mattia Placidi | Italy | 346.00 | 30 | did not advance | | | |
| 31 | Jeinkler Aguirre | Cuba | 342.40 | 31 | did not advance | | | |
| 32 | Yusmandy Paz | Cuba | 330.00 | 32 | did not advance | | | |
| 33 | Jonathan Chan | Singapore | 328.00 | 33 | did not advance | | | |
| 34 | Loïs Szymczak | France | 324.60 | 34 | did not advance | | | |
| 35 | Chew Yiwei | Malaysia | 323.85 | 35 | did not advance | | | |
| 36 | Juan Reyes | Colombia | 317.65 | 36 | did not advance | | | |
| 37 | Kevin García | Colombia | 313.85 | 37 | did not advance | | | |
| 38 | Youssef Ezzat | Egypt | 295.70 | 38 | did not advance | | | |
| 39 | Mohab Mohymen | Egypt | 293.55 | 39 | did not advance | | | |
| 40 | Frandiel Gómez | Dominican Republic | 282.10 | 40 | did not advance | | | |
| 41 | Vartan Bayanduryan | Armenia | 280.90 | 41 | did not advance | | | |
| 42 | Aurelian Dragomir | Romania | 278.35 | 42 | did not advance | | | |
