= North Korea at the 2017 World Aquatics Championships =

- Flag of North Korea
- FINA code: PRK
- National federation: North Korean Aquatics Federation

in Budapest, Hungary
- Competitors: 17 in 3 sports
- Medals Ranked 21st: Gold 0 Silver 1 Bronze 1 Total 2

World Aquatics Championships appearances
- 1973; 1975; 1978; 1982; 1986; 1991; 1994; 1998; 2001; 2003; 2005; 2007; 2009; 2011; 2013; 2015; 2017; 2019; 2022; 2023; 2024

North Korea competed at the 2017 World Aquatics Championships in Budapest, Hungary.

== Medalists ==
Medal	Name	Sport	Event	Date
Silver	Kim Kuk-hyang; Kim Mi-rae	Diving	Women's 10 m synchronized platform	July 16
Bronze	Kim Mi-rae; Hyon Il-myong	Diving	Mixed 10 m synchronized platform	July 15

== Diving ==
North Korea has entered 5 divers (two male and three female).

Men

Athlete	Event	Preliminaries		Semifinals		Final	
Athlete	Event	Points	Rank	Points	Rank	Points	Rank
Hyon Il-myong	10 m platform	357.20	25	did not advance			
Ri Hyon-ju	10 m platform	488.70	4 Q	468.80	6 Q	434.85	11
Hyon Il-myong; Ri Hyon-ju	10 m synchronized platform	409.95	7 Q	—		372.24	11

Women

Athlete	Event	Preliminaries		Semifinals		Final	
Athlete	Event	Points	Rank	Points	Rank	Points	Rank
Kim Un-hyang	1 m springboard	244.30	13	—		did not advance	
Kim Kuk-hyang	10 m platform	351.20	4 Q	360.85	3 Q	360.00	6
Kim Mi-rae	10 m platform	335.25	6 Q	346.00	5 Q	385.55	4
Kim Kuk-hyang; Kim Mi-rae	10 m synchronized platform	325.62	2 Q	—		336.48	2nd place, silver medalist(s)

Mixed

Athlete	Event	Final	
Athlete	Event	Points	Rank
Kim Mi-rae; Hyon Il-myong	10 m synchronized platform	318.12	3rd place, bronze medalist(s)
Kim Un-hyang; Ri Hyon-ju	Team	341.20	10

== Swimming ==
North Korea has received a Universality invitation from FINA to send two female swimmers to the World Championships.

Athlete	Event	Heat		Semifinal		Final	
Athlete	Event	Time	Rank	Time	Rank	Time	Rank
Jang Myong-gyong	Women's 50 m breaststroke	35.11	39	did not advance			
Jang Myong-gyong	Women's 100 m breaststroke	1:18.87	47	did not advance			
Pak Mi-song	Women's 50 m freestyle	27.94	55	did not advance			
Pak Mi-song	Women's 100 m freestyle	1:02.24	65	did not advance			

== Synchronized swimming ==
North Korea's synchronized swimming team consisted of 10 athletes (10 female).

Women

Athlete	Event	Preliminaries		Final	
Athlete	Event	Points	Rank	Points	Rank
Min Hae-yon	Solo technical routine	82.6416	9 Q	83.1769	9
Min Hae-yon	Solo free routine	84.1667	11 Q	82.9000	11
Jang Hyon-ok; Min Hae-yon; Ko Su-rim (R)	Duet technical routine	81.5767	14	did not advance	
Jang Hyon-ok; Min Hae-yon; Jong Na-ri (R)	Duet free routine	83.7667	13	did not advance	
Cha Ye-gyong (R); Jang Hyon-ok; Jong Na-ri; Ju Yu-na (R); Ko Su-rim; Min Hae-yon; Mun Hye-song; Ri Il-sim; Ri Sol; Yun Yu-jong	Team technical routine	83.6271	10 Q	83.4354	10
Cha Ye-gyong (R); Jang Hyon-ok; Jong Na-ri; Ju Yu-na (R); Ko Su-rim; Min Hae-yon; Mun Hye-song; Ri Il-sim; Ri Sol; Yun Yu-jong	Team free routine	83.6000	11 Q	83.7667	11
Cha Ye-gyong; Jang Hyon-ok; Jong Na-ri; Ju Yu-na; Ko Su-rim; Min Hae-yon; Mun Hye-song; Ri Il-sim; Ri Sol; Yun Yu-jong	Free routine combination	84.3333	9 Q	84.2000	9

Legend: (R) = Reserve Athlete
