= Ukraine at the 2017 World Aquatics Championships =

- Flag of Ukraine
- World Aquatics code: UKR
- National federation: Ukrainian Swimming Federation
- Website: www.swimukraine.org.ua

in Budapest, Hungary
- Competitors: 39 in 5 sports
- Medals Ranked 18th: Gold 0 Silver 2 Bronze 7 Total 9

World Aquatics Championships appearances
- 1994; 1998; 2001; 2003; 2005; 2007; 2009; 2011; 2013; 2015; 2017; 2019; 2022; 2023; 2024; 2025

Other related appearances
- Soviet Union (1973–1991)

Ukraine competed at the 2017 World Aquatics Championships in Budapest, Hungary from 14 July to 30 July.

== Medalists ==
Medal	Name	Sport	Event	Date
Silver	Maryna Aleksiiva; Vladyslava Aleksiiva; Valeriia Aprielieva; Oleksandra Kashuba; Yana Nariezhna; Anastasiya Savchuk; Alina Shynkarenko; Kseniya Sydorenko; Anna Voloshyna; Yelyzaveta Yakhno	Synchronized swimming	Women's free routine combination	July 21
Silver	Mykhailo Romanchuk	Swimming	Men's 1500 m freestyle	July 30
Bronze	Oleh Kolodiy; Illya Kvasha	Diving	Men's 3 m synchronized springboard	July 15
Bronze	Anna Voloshyna	Synchronized swimming	Women's solo technical routine	July 15
Bronze	Anna Voloshyna; Yelyzaveta Yakhno	Synchronized swimming	Women's duet technical routine	July 16
Bronze	Anna Voloshyna	Synchronized swimming	Women's solo free routine	July 19
Bronze	Anna Voloshyna; Yelyzaveta Yakhno	Synchronized swimming	Women's duet free routine	July 20
Bronze	Maryna Aleksiiva; Vladyslava Aleksiiva; Valeriia Aprielieva; Oleksandra Kashuba; Anastasiya Savchuk; Kseniya Sydorenko; Anna Voloshyna; Yelyzaveta Yakhno	Synchronized swimming	Women's team free routine	July 21
Bronze	Andriy Hovorov	Swimming	Men's 50 m butterfly	July 24

== Diving ==
Ukraine has entered 12 divers (five male and seven female).

Men

Athlete	Event	Preliminaries		Semifinals		Final	
Athlete	Event	Points	Rank	Points	Rank	Points	Rank
Oleh Kolodiy	1 m springboard	374.80	6 Q	—N/a		419.05	6
Illya Kvasha	1 m springboard	349.20	16	—N/a		did not advance	
Oleh Kolodiy	3 m springboard	418.70	14 Q	409.95	12 Q	470.00	7
Illya Kvasha	3 m springboard	416.30	15 Q	405.60	15	did not advance	
Maksym Dolhov	10 m platform	432.50	11 Q	413.55	12 Q	484.70	5
Oleh Kolodiy; Illya Kvasha	3 m synchronized springboard	398.91	6 Q	—N/a		429.99	3rd place, bronze medalist(s)
Maksym Dolhov; Oleksandr Horshkovozov	10 m synchronized platform	419.01	3 Q	—N/a		416.31	5

Women

Athlete	Event	Preliminaries		Semifinals		Final	
Athlete	Event	Points	Rank	Points	Rank	Points	Rank
Hanna Pysmenska	1 m springboard	241.00	20	—N/a		did not advance	
Diana Shelestyuk	1 m springboard	211.30	34	—N/a		did not advance	
Anastasiia Nedobiga	3 m springboard	273.00	16 Q	274.65	16	did not advance	
Hanna Pysmenska	3 m springboard	216.60	38	did not advance			
Hanna Krasnoshlyk	10 m platform	253.50	30	did not advance			
Sofiia Lyskun	10 m platform	270.45	26	did not advance			
Anastasiia Nedobiga; Diana Shelestyuk	3 m synchronized springboard	270.57	9 Q	—N/a		280.56	7
Valeriia Liulko; Sofiia Lyskun	10 m synchronized platform	275.10	11 Q	—N/a		265.20	12

Mixed

Athlete	Event	Final	
Athlete	Event	Points	Rank
Viktoriya Kesar; Stanislav Oliferchyk	3 m synchronized springboard	270.06	=10
Valeriia Liulko; Maksym Dolgov	10 m synchronized platform	287.34	12
Anastasiia Nedobiga; Oleh Kolodiy	Team	284.20	18

== High diving ==
Ukraine qualified one male high diver.

Athlete	Event	Points	Rank
Oleksiy Pryhorov	Men's high diving	330.30	11

== Open water swimming ==
Ukraine has entered four open water swimmers

Athlete	Event	Time	Rank
Ihor Chervynskyy	Men's 5 km	55:13.2	25
Ihor Chervynskyy	Men's 10 km	1:54:27.20	34
Ihor Snitko	Men's 5 km	55:46.7	40
Ihor Snitko	Men's 10 km	1:55:06.00	43
Maryna Kyryk	Women's 5 km	1:03:51.3	43
Maryna Kyryk	Women's 10 km	2:17:02.2	52
Krystyna Panchishko	Women's 5 km	1:01:24.4	23
Krystyna Panchishko	Women's 10 km	2:12:12.5	48

== Swimming ==
Ukrainian swimmers have achieved qualifying standards in the following events (up to a maximum of 2 swimmers in each event at the A-standard entry time, and 1 at the B-standard):

Men

Athlete	Event	Heat		Semifinal		Final	
Athlete	Event	Time	Rank	Time	Rank	Time	Rank
Serhiy Frolov	1500 m freestyle	14:59.32	8 Q	—N/a		14:55.10	6
Andriy Hovorov	50 m freestyle	22.05	12 Q	21.96	13	did not advance	
Andriy Hovorov	50 m butterfly	22.92	1 Q	22.77	2 Q	22.84	3rd place, bronze medalist(s)
Dmytro Hurnytskyi	50 m backstroke	25.56	=27	did not advance			
Dmytro Hurnytskyi	100 m backstroke	56.05	31	did not advance			
Bohdan Kasian	50 m backstroke	25.31	21	did not advance			
Andriy Khloptsov	50 m butterfly	23.54	14 Q	23.31 WJ	8 Q	23.31 =WJ	7
Liubomyr Lemeshko	100 m butterfly	52.97	32	did not advance			
Mykhailo Romanchuk	1500 m freestyle	14:44.11 NR	1 Q	—N/a		14:37.14 NR	2nd place, silver medalist(s)
Serhiy Shevtsov	50 m freestyle	22.13	14 Q	22.22	16	did not advance	
Serhiy Shevtsov	100 m freestyle	48.60 NR	11 Q	48.30 NR	7 Q	48.26 NR	8

Women

Athlete	Event	Heat		Semifinal		Final	
Athlete	Event	Time	Rank	Time	Rank	Time	Rank
Mariya Liver	50 m breaststroke	31.33	19	did not advance			
Mariya Liver	100 m breaststroke	1:10.49	33	did not advance			
Daryna Zevina	50 m backstroke	28.78	31	did not advance			
Daryna Zevina	100 m backstroke	1:00.59	16 Q	1:00.40	14	did not advance	
Daryna Zevina	200 m backstroke	2:09.16	7 Q	2:08.30	9	did not advance	

== Synchronized swimming ==
Ukraine's synchronized swimming team consisted of 12 athletes (12 female).

Women

Athlete	Event	Preliminaries		Final	
Athlete	Event	Points	Rank	Points	Rank
Anna Voloshyna	Solo technical routine	90.5617	4 Q	91.9992	3rd place, bronze medalist(s)
Anna Voloshyna	Solo free routine	92.8667	3 Q	93.3000	3rd place, bronze medalist(s)
Anna Voloshyna; Yelyzaveta Yakhno; Anastasiya Savchuk (R)	Duet technical routine	90.6940	3 Q	92.6482	3rd place, bronze medalist(s)
Anna Voloshyna; Yelyzaveta Yakhno; Anastasiya Savchuk (R)	Duet free routine	92.8333	3 Q	93.2667	3rd place, bronze medalist(s)
Maryna Aleksiiva; Vladyslava Aleksiiva; Oleksandra Kashuba; Yana Nariezhna; Anastasiya Savchuk; Kseniya Sydorenko; Anna Voloshyna; Yelyzaveta Yakhno; Valeriia Aprielieva (R); Alina Shynkarenko (R)	Team technical routine	91.4917	4 Q	92.3596	4
Maryna Aleksiiva; Vladyslava Aleksiiva; Valeriia Aprielieva; Oleksandra Kashuba; Anastasiya Savchuk; Kseniya Sydorenko; Anna Voloshyna; Yelyzaveta Yakhno; Yana Nariezhna (R); Alina Shynkarenko (R)	Team free routine	92.9000	3 Q	93.9333	3rd place, bronze medalist(s)
Maryna Aleksiiva; Vladyslava Aleksiiva; Valeriia Aprielieva; Oleksandra Kashuba; Yana Nariezhna; Anastasiya Savchuk; Alina Shynkarenko; Kseniya Sydorenko; Anna Voloshyna; Yelyzaveta Yakhno; Kateryna Honcharova (R); Kateryna Reznik (R)	Free routine combination	93.1667	2 Q	94.0000	2nd place, silver medalist(s)

Legend: (R) = Reserve Athlete
