= Diving at the 2017 World Aquatics Championships – Women's synchronized 10 metre platform =

Women's synchronized 10 metre platform at the 2017 World Aquatics Championships
- Venue: Danube Arena
- Location: Budapest, Hungary
- Dates: 16 July
- Competitors: 32 from 16 nations
- Teams: 16
- Winning points: 352.56

Medalists
gold medal	Ren Qian; Si Yajie	China
silver medal	Kim Mi-rae; Kim Kuk-hyang	North Korea
bronze medal	Cheong Jun Hoong; Pandelela Rinong	Malaysia

The Women's synchronized 10 metre platform competition at the 2017 World Championships was held on 16 July 2017.

== Results ==
The preliminary round was started at 10:00. The final was held at 18:30.

Green denotes finalists

Rank	Nation	Divers	Preliminary		Final	
Rank	Nation	Divers	Points	Rank	Points	Rank
1st place, gold medalist(s)	China	Ren Qian; Si Yajie	334.32	1	352.56	1
2nd place, silver medalist(s)	North Korea	Kim Mi-rae; Kim Kuk-hyang	325.62	2	336.48	2
3rd place, bronze medalist(s)	Malaysia	Cheong Jun Hoong; Pandelela Rinong	309.66	4	328.74	3
4	Canada	Meaghan Benfeito; Caeli McKay	293.22	6	315.78	4
5	Australia	Taneka Kovchenko; Melissa Wu	311.16	3	308.10	5
6	United States	Tarrin Gilliland; Jessica Parratto	293.70	5	306.96	6
7	Great Britain	Tonia Couch; Lois Toulson	283.68	9	300.48	7
8	Russia	Valeriia Belova; Yulia Timoshinina	290.04	7	291.96	8
9	Mexico	Gabriela Agúndez; Samantha Jiménez	284.46	8	290.58	9
10	Japan	Matsuri Arai; Nana Sasaki	280.44	10	283.32	10
11	Italy	Noemi Batki; Chiara Pellacani	262.50	12	269.16	11
12	Ukraine	Valeriia Liulko; Sofiia Lyskun	275.10	11	265.20	12
13	Netherlands	Inge Jansen; Celine van Duijn	262.32	13	did not advance	
14	South Korea	Cho Eun-bi; Kim Su-ji	261.42	14	did not advance	
15	Germany	Christina Wassen; Elena Wassen	257.94	15	did not advance	
16	Colombia	Carolina Murillo; Daniela Zapata	242.64	16	did not advance	
