= Dusablon =

Dusablon is a surname. Notable people with the surname include:

- Benoît Dusablon (born 1979), Canadian ice hockey player
- Jade Dusablon (born 1994), Canadian long-distance swimmer
