= Diving at the 2017 World Aquatics Championships – Women's 1 metre springboard =

Women's 1 metre springboard at the 2017 World Aquatics Championships
- Venue: Danube Arena
- Location: Budapest, Hungary
- Dates: 14 July (preliminaries); 15 July (final)
- Competitors: 42 from 28 nations
- Winning points: 314.95

Medalists
gold medal	Maddison Keeney	Australia
silver medal	Nadezhda Bazhina	Russia
bronze medal	Elena Bertocchi	Italy

The Women's 1 metre springboard competition at the 2017 World Championships was held on 14 and 15 July 2017.

== Results ==
The preliminary round was started on 14 July at 16:00. The final was held on 15 July at 16:00.

Green denotes finalists

Rank	Diver	Nationality	Preliminary		Final	
Rank	Diver	Nationality	Points	Rank	Points	Rank
1st place, gold medalist(s)	Maddison Keeney	Australia	283.80	1	314.95	1
2nd place, silver medalist(s)	Nadezhda Bazhina	Russia	254.10	10	304.70	2
3rd place, bronze medalist(s)	Elena Bertocchi	Italy	263.05	4	296.40	3
4	Chen Yiwen	China	277.20	2	294.70	4
5	Maria Polyakova	Russia	260.80	6	289.05	5
6	Tina Punzel	Germany	261.90	5	284.25	6
7	Esther Qin	Australia	259.45	7	281.20	7
8	Louisa Stawczynski	Germany	254.70	9	277.15	8
9	Katherine Torrance	Great Britain	255.60	8	275.90	9
10	Arantxa Chávez	Mexico	249.50	11	272.30	10
11	Dolores Hernández	Mexico	246.90	12	257.20	11
12	Cheong Jun Hoong	Malaysia	272.75	3	252.45	12
13	Kim Un-hyang	North Korea	244.30	13	Did not advance	
14	Chang Yani	China	243.30	14	Did not advance	
15	Michelle Heimberg	Switzerland	242.95	15	Did not advance	
16	Alena Khamulkina	Belarus	242.80	16	Did not advance	
17	Nur Dhabitah Sabri	Malaysia	242.35	17	Did not advance	
18	Nicole Gillis	South Africa	241.70	18	Did not advance	
19	Elizabeth Cui	New Zealand	241.50	19	Did not advance	
20	Hanna Pysmenska	Ukraine	241.00	20	Did not advance	
21	Kaja Skrzek	Poland	240.30	21	Did not advance	
22	Maria Coburn	United States	239.80	22	Did not advance	
23	Kim Na-mi	South Korea	237.45	23	Did not advance	
24	María Betancourt	Venezuela	236.50	24	Did not advance	
25	Alison Gibson	United States	236.40	25	Did not advance	
26	Diana Pineda	Colombia	232.40	26	Did not advance	
27	Daphne Wils	Netherlands	227.90	27	Did not advance	
28	Julia Vincent	South Africa	221.80	28	Did not advance	
29	Marcela Marić	Croatia	219.70	29	Did not advance	
30	Shaye Boddington	New Zealand	218.60	30	Did not advance	
31	Chiara Pellacani	Italy	218.15	31	Did not advance	
32	Luana Lira	Brazil	215.60	32	Did not advance	
33	Tammy Takagi	Brazil	214.40	33	Did not advance	
34	Diana Shelestyuk	Ukraine	211.30	34	Did not advance	
35	Roosa Kanerva	Finland	207.00	35	Did not advance	
36	Daniela Zapata	Colombia	206.15	36	Did not advance	
37	Anca Serb	Romania	204.95	37	Did not advance	
38	Indrė Girdauskaitė	Lithuania	193.85	38	Did not advance	
39	Moon Na-yun	South Korea	191.45	39	Did not advance	
40	Jelena Baković	Serbia	188.50	40	Did not advance	
41	Maha Abdelsalam	Egypt	185.65	41	Did not advance	
42	Prisis Ruiz	Cuba	171.05	42	Did not advance	
—	Habiba Ashraf	Egypt	did not start			
