= Canada at the 2017 World Aquatics Championships =

- Flag of Canada
- World Aquatics code: CAN
- National federation: Aquatic Federation of Canada
- Website: www.aquaticscanadaaquatiques.com

in Budapest, Hungary
- Competitors: 83 in 5 sports
- Medals Ranked 13th: Gold 1 Silver 1 Bronze 5 Total 7

World Aquatics Championships appearances
- 1973; 1975; 1978; 1982; 1986; 1991; 1994; 1998; 2001; 2003; 2005; 2007; 2009; 2011; 2013; 2015; 2017; 2019; 2022; 2023; 2024; 2025

Canada competed at the 2017 World Aquatics Championships in Budapest, Hungary from 14 July to 30 July.

Canada was scheduled to compete in all six disciplines and its team consisted of 84 athletes (31 men and 53 women). However, only 83 competed across five disciplines because high diver Lysanne Richard withdrew from competition.

== Medallists ==
Medal	Name	Sport	Event	Date
Gold	Kylie Masse	Swimming	Women's 100 m backstroke	July 25
Silver	Jennifer Abel; Melissa Citrini-Beaulieu	Diving	Women's 3 m synchronized springboard	July 17
Bronze	Jennifer Abel	Diving	Women's 3 m springboard	July 21
Bronze	Jennifer Abel; François Imbeau-Dulac	Diving	Mixed 3 m synchronized springboard	July 22
Bronze	Javier Acevedo*; Richard Funk; Yuri Kisil; Kylie Masse; Penny Oleksiak; Rebecca Smith*; Chantal van Landeghem*	Swimming	Mixed 4 × 100 m medley relay	July 26
Bronze	Javier Acevedo; Yuri Kisil; Markus Thormeyer*; Sandrine Mainville*; Penny Oleksiak; Chantal van Landeghem	Swimming	Mixed 4 × 100 m freestyle relay	July 29
Bronze	Sydney Pickrem	Swimming	Women's 400 m individual medley	July 30

== Competitors ==
The following is the list of number of competitors participating at the Championships per discipline.

Sport	Men	Women	Total
Diving	5	6	11
Open water swimming	3	3	6
Swimming	9	17	26
Synchronized swimming	1	13	14
Water polo	13	13	26
Total	31	53	84

== Diving ==
Canada has entered 11 divers (five male and six female). Canada will compete in all events except the men's 10 metres synchronized platform and the team event.

Men

Athlete	Event	Preliminaries		Semifinals		Final	
Athlete	Event	Points	Rank	Points	Rank	Points	Rank
Philippe Gagné	3 m springboard	410.25	16 Q	396.90	17	did not advance	
François Imbeau-Dulac	3 m springboard	385.30	28	did not advance			
Ethan Pitman	10 m platform	386.50	21	did not advance			
Vincent Riendeau	10 m platform	389.25	20	did not advance			
Philippe Gagné; François Imbeau-Dulac	3 m synchronized springboard	404.43	4 Q	—N/a		390.06	9

Women

Athlete	Event	Preliminaries		Semifinals		Final	
Athlete	Event	Points	Rank	Points	Rank	Points	Rank
Jennifer Abel	3 m springboard	335.00	3 Q	337.60	4 Q	351.55	3rd place, bronze medalist(s)
Pamela Ware	3 m springboard	317.25	5 Q	338.25	3 Q	335.10	6
Meaghan Benfeito	10 m platform	339.75	5 Q	355.15	4 Q	331.40	8
Olivia Chamandy	10 m platform	299.10	17 Q	320.55	10 Q	307.15	10
Jennifer Abel; Melissa Citrini-Beaulieu	3 m synchronized springboard	306.60	2 Q	—N/a		323.43	2nd place, silver medalist(s)
Meaghan Benfeito; Caeli McKay	10 m synchronized platform	293.22	6 Q	—N/a		315.78	4

Mixed

Athlete	Event	Final	
Athlete	Event	Points	Rank
François Imbeau-Dulac; Jennifer Abel	3 m synchronized springboard	297.72	3rd place, bronze medalist(s)
Nathan Zsombor-Murray; Meaghan Benfeito	10 m synchronized platform	307.80	5

== High diving ==
Canada qualified one female high diver. Lysanne Richard had to withdraw from the competition after sustaining a neck injury.

== Open water swimming ==
Canada's open water swimming team was named on April 9, 2017. The team consists of six athletes (three men and three women).

Athlete	Event	Time	Rank
Philippe Guertin	Men's 10 km	1:52:40.6	28
Eric Hedlin	Men's 5 km	54:56.9	14
Richard Weinberger	Men's 10 km	1:52:36.0	23
Jade Dusablon	Women's 10 km	2:07:16.8	32
Stephanie Horner	Women's 10 km	2:04:48.1	28
Breanne Siwicki	Women's 5 km	1:01:59.8	29
Eric Hedlin; Richard Weinberger; Stephanie Horner; Breanne Siwicki	Mixed team	55:58.3	11

== Swimming ==
Canada's swimming team was named on April 9, 2017, after the conclusion of the Canadian Swimming trials in Victoria, British Columbia. A total of 26 swimmers (17 women and 9 men) were named to the team. To qualify for the team, an athlete had to place in the top two of their event and also meet the a standard time set by FINA. Notable absentees to the team include, 2015 World Championship bronze medalist Emily Overholt, multiple time 2015 Pan American Games medalists Santo Condorelli and multiple World and Olympic medalist Ryan Cochrane (who retired after the 2016 Summer Olympics).

Men

Athlete	Event	Heat		Semifinal		Final	
Athlete	Event	Time	Rank	Time	Rank	Time	Rank
Javier Acevedo	50 m backstroke	25.16	15 Q	25.13	16	did not advance	
Javier Acevedo	100 m backstroke	54.43	15 Q	54.11	14	did not advance	
Jeremy Bagshaw	400 m freestyle	3:48.82	16	—N/a		did not advance	
Josiah Binnema	50 m butterfly	24.50	37	did not advance			
Josiah Binnema	100 m butterfly	53.10	34	did not advance			
Tristan Cote	400 m individual medley	4:19.87	17	—N/a		did not advance	
Richard Funk	50 m breaststroke	27.59	19	did not advance			
Richard Funk	100 m breaststroke	59.89	14 Q	59.92	15	did not advance	
Yuri Kisil	50 m freestyle	22.43	25	did not advance			
Yuri Kisil	100 m freestyle	48.56	=9 Q	48.50	10	did not advance	
Oleksandr Loginov	50 m freestyle	22.88	=47	did not advance			
Markus Thormeyer	200 m freestyle	1:50.23	44	did not advance			
Javier Acevedo; Yuri Kisil; Carson Olafson; Markus Thormeyer	4×100 m freestyle relay	3:14.88	8 Q	—N/a		3:15.25	6
Jeremy Bagshaw; Yuri Kisil; Carson Olafson; Markus Thormeyer	4×200 m freestyle relay	7:17.36	14	—N/a		did not advance	
Javier Acevedo; Josiah Binnema; Richard Funk; Yuri Kisil	4×100 m medley relay	3:35.14	12	—N/a		did not advance	

Women

Athlete	Event	Heat		Semifinal		Final	
Athlete	Event	Time	Rank	Time	Rank	Time	Rank
Olivia Anderson	800 m freestyle	8:43.93	20	—N/a		did not advance	
Olivia Anderson	1500 m freestyle	16:34.50	14	—N/a		did not advance	
Hilary Caldwell	100 m backstroke	1:00.37	13 Q	1:00.29	12	did not advance	
Hilary Caldwell	200 m backstroke	2:08.32	6 Q	2:07.64	8 Q	2:07.15	6
Mary-Sophie Harvey	200 m freestyle	1:58.38	15 Q	1:58.15	14	did not advance	
Mary-Sophie Harvey	400 m freestyle	4:09.74	11	—N/a		did not advance	
Mary-Sophie Harvey	400 m individual medley	4:46.88	19	—N/a		did not advance	
Sandrine Mainville	50 m freestyle	24.99	15 Q	24.67	11	did not advance	
Sandrine Mainville	100 m freestyle	54.22	12 Q	54.01	13	did not advance	
Kylie Masse	50 m backstroke	28.10	13 Q	27.64	10	did not advance	
Kylie Masse	100 m backstroke	58.62	1 Q	58.18 AM	1 Q	58.10 WR	1st place, gold medalist(s)
Kylie Masse	200 m backstroke	2:08.30	5 Q	2:05.97 NR	2 Q	2:07.04	5
Ashley McGregor	200 m breaststroke	2:25.31	9 Q	2:25.75	14	did not advance	
Rachel Nicol	50 m breaststroke	31.02	15 Q	30.49	8 Q	30.80	8
Rachel Nicol	100 m breaststroke	1:07.10	8 Q	1:07.03	10	did not advance	
Penny Oleksiak	100 m freestyle	53.18	4 Q	53.05	6 Q	52.94	6
Penny Oleksiak	50 m butterfly	25.87	10 Q	25.66	4 Q	25.62	5
Penny Oleksiak	100 m butterfly	57.51	5 Q	57.07	5 Q	56.94	4
Mackenzie Padington	400 m freestyle	4:09.88	12	—N/a		did not advance	
Mackenzie Padington	800 m freestyle	8:40.68	16	—N/a		did not advance	
Sydney Pickrem	200 m individual medley	2:10.14	2 Q	2:09.17 NR	3 Q	DSQ	
Sydney Pickrem	400 m individual medley	4:36.25	4 Q	—N/a		4:32.88	3rd place, bronze medalist(s)
Katerine Savard	200 m freestyle	1:58.16	14 Q	1:58.46	15	did not advance	
Katerine Savard	50 m butterfly	26.81	25	did not advance			
Katerine Savard	100 m butterfly	58.71	18	did not advance			
Erika Seltenreich-Hodgson	200 m individual medley	2:11.67	10 Q	2:11.61	11	did not advance	
Kierra Smith	100 m breaststroke	1:07.43	=15 Q	1:06.62	=6 Q	1:06.90	6
Kierra Smith	200 m breaststroke	2:24.57	6 Q	2:23.18	5 Q	2:22.23	5
Michelle Toro	50 m freestyle	24.64	6 Q	24.66	10	did not advance	
Sandrine Mainville; Penny Oleksiak; Kayla Sanchez; Rebecca Smith*; Michelle Toro*; Chantal van Landeghem	4×100 m freestyle relay	3:35.84	5 Q	—N/a		3:33.88	4
Mary-Sophie Harvey; Mackenzie Padington; Katerine Savard; Kayla Sanchez*; Rebecca Smith	4×200 m freestyle relay	7:56.49	8 Q	—N/a		7:55.57	8
Sandrine Mainville*; Kylie Masse; Penny Oleksiak; Kierra Smith; Rebecca Smith*; Chantal van Landeghem	4×100 m medley relay	3:57.17	3 Q	—N/a		3:54.86	4

Mixed

Athlete	Event	Heat		Final	
Athlete	Event	Time	Rank	Time	Rank
Javier Acevedo; Yuri Kisil; Markus Thormeyer*; Sandrine Mainville*; Penny Oleksiak; Chantal van Landeghem	4×100 m freestyle relay	3:25.07	3 Q	3:23.55 NR	3rd place, bronze medalist(s)
Javier Acevedo*; Richard Funk; Yuri Kisil; Kylie Masse; Penny Oleksiak; Rebecca Smith*; Chantal van Landeghem*	4×100 m medley relay	3:44.46	3 Q	3:41.25 NR	3rd place, bronze medalist(s)

== Synchronized swimming ==
Canada's synchronized swimming team consisted of 14 athletes (1 male and 13 female).

Women

Athlete	Event	Preliminaries		Final	
Athlete	Event	Points	Rank	Points	Rank
Jacqueline Simoneau	Solo technical routine	89.2331	5 Q	89.5000	5
Jacqueline Simoneau	Solo free routine	89.8333	5 Q	90.1333	6
Claudia Holzner; Jacqueline Simoneau	Duet technical routine	87.7081	7 Q	87.6523	7
Claudia Holzner; Jacqueline Simoneau	Duet free routine	88.9667	7 Q	89.0000	7
Janelle Ball; Gabrielle Boisvert (R); Gabriella Brisson; Andree-Anne Cote; Claudia Holzner; Gwendolyn McGuire (R); Samantha Nealon; Elizabeth Savard; Jacqueline Simoneau; Kali Wong	Team technical routine	86.4407	7 Q	86.2044	7
Janelle Ball (R); Gabrielle Boisvert; Gabriella Brisson (R); Claudia Holzner; Gwendolyn McGuire; Marie-Lou Morin; Elizabeth Savard; Jacqueline Simoneau; Laurence Vezina; Kali Wong	Team free routine	88.2667	7 Q	88.8000	7

Mixed

Athlete	Event	Preliminaries		Final	
Athlete	Event	Points	Rank	Points	Rank
Isabelle Rampling; Rene Prevost	Duet technical routine	81.3330	6 Q	82.3413	6
Isabelle Rampling; Rene Prevost	Duet free routine	83.0667	6 Q	83.5667	6

Legend: (R) = Reserve Athlete

== Water polo ==
Canada has qualified both a men's and women's teams. The roster of both teams (with each consisting of 13 athletes each) was announced on July 12, 2017.

=== Men's tournament ===
Canada's men's water polo team qualified for the World Championships with a silver medal performance at the 2017 UANA Cup in Couva, Trinidad and Tobago.

Team roster

- Milan Radenovic
- Gaelan Patterson
- Aria Soleimani
- Nicolas Constantin-Bicari
- Matthew Halajian
- Scott Robinson
- Jérémie Blanchard
- David Lapins
- Dusan Radojcic
- Reuel D'Souza
- George Torakis
- Devon Thumwood
- Robin Randall

Group play

Pos	Team	Pld	W	D	L	GF	GA	GD	Pts	Qualification
1	Montenegro	3	2	1	0	35	18	+17	5	Quarterfinals
2	Brazil	3	1	1	1	17	22	−5	3	Playoffs
3	Kazakhstan	3	1	0	2	17	28	−11	2 (Note: Kazakhstan 10–9 Canada)	Playoffs
4	Canada	3	0	2	1	23	24	−1	2	

Source: Sportresult
Rules for classification: 1) points; 2) head-to-head points; 3) head-to-head goal difference; 4) head-to-head number of goals scored; 5) better result against higher placed team.
Notes:

17 July 2017; 17:05	Report	Montenegro	8–8	Canada	Alfréd Hajós National Swimming Stadium, Budapest; Referees: Georgios Stavridis (GRE), Francesc Buch (ESP)
17 July 2017; 17:05	Report	Score by quarters: 3–1, 2–2, 1–1, 2–4			Alfréd Hajós National Swimming Stadium, Budapest; Referees: Georgios Stavridis (GRE), Francesc Buch (ESP)
17 July 2017; 17:05	Report	Petković 3	Goals	three players 2	Alfréd Hajós National Swimming Stadium, Budapest; Referees: Georgios Stavridis (GRE), Francesc Buch (ESP)

19 July 2017; 18:30	Report	Canada	9–10	Kazakhstan	Alfréd Hajós National Swimming Stadium, Budapest; Referees: Georgios Stavridis (GRE), Nader Ghafouri (IRI)
19 July 2017; 18:30	Report	Score by quarters: 2–2, 3–3, 3–2, 1–3			Alfréd Hajós National Swimming Stadium, Budapest; Referees: Georgios Stavridis (GRE), Nader Ghafouri (IRI)
19 July 2017; 18:30	Report	Thumwood 4	Goals	Medvedev, Ukumanov 4	Alfréd Hajós National Swimming Stadium, Budapest; Referees: Georgios Stavridis (GRE), Nader Ghafouri (IRI)

21 July 2017; 17:30	Report	Brazil	6–6	Canada	Alfréd Hajós National Swimming Stadium, Budapest; Referees: Andrej Franulović (CRO), Dion Willis (RSA)
21 July 2017; 17:30	Report	Score by quarters: 1–2, 3–2, 1–2, 1–0			Alfréd Hajós National Swimming Stadium, Budapest; Referees: Andrej Franulović (CRO), Dion Willis (RSA)
21 July 2017; 17:30	Report	Coutinho 2	Goals	six players 1	Alfréd Hajós National Swimming Stadium, Budapest; Referees: Andrej Franulović (CRO), Dion Willis (RSA)

13th–16th place semifinals

23 July 2017; 10:30	Report	Canada	6–10	France	Alfréd Hajós National Swimming Stadium, Budapest; Referees: Stanko Ivanovski (MNE), Matan Schwartz (ISR)
23 July 2017; 10:30	Report	Score by quarters: 4–3, 1–2, 1–2, 0–3			Alfréd Hajós National Swimming Stadium, Budapest; Referees: Stanko Ivanovski (MNE), Matan Schwartz (ISR)
23 July 2017; 10:30	Report	Thumwood 2	Goals	Crousillat, Marzouki 3	Alfréd Hajós National Swimming Stadium, Budapest; Referees: Stanko Ivanovski (MNE), Matan Schwartz (ISR)

15th place game

25 July 2017; 09:30	Report	Canada	9–6	South Africa	Alfréd Hajós National Swimming Stadium, Budapest; Referees: Diego Garibaldi (ARG), Michael Brooks (NZL)
25 July 2017; 09:30	Report	Score by quarters: 1–2, 4–1, 2–1, 2–2			Alfréd Hajós National Swimming Stadium, Budapest; Referees: Diego Garibaldi (ARG), Michael Brooks (NZL)
25 July 2017; 09:30	Report	Constantin-Bicari 5	Goals	Le Roux 2	Alfréd Hajós National Swimming Stadium, Budapest; Referees: Diego Garibaldi (ARG), Michael Brooks (NZL)

=== Women's tournament ===
Team roster

- Jessica Gaudreault
- Krystina Alogbo
- Axelle Crevier
- Emma Wright
- Monika Eggens
- Kyra Christmas
- Joëlle Békhazi
- Elyse Lemay-Lavoie
- Hayley McKelvey
- Christine Robinson
- Kelly McKee
- Shae Fournier
- Ymane Hage

Group play

Pos	Team	Pld	W	D	L	GF	GA	GD	Pts	Qualification
1	Italy	3	3	0	0	43	16	+27	6	Quarterfinals
2	Canada	3	2	0	1	29	24	+5	4	Playoffs
3	China	3	1	0	2	27	28	−1	2	Playoffs
4	Brazil	3	0	0	3	14	45	−31	0	

Source: Sportresult
Rules for classification: 1) points; 2) head-to-head points; 3) head-to-head goal difference; 4) head-to-head number of goals scored; 5) Goal difference.

16 July 2017; 09:30	Report	Italy	10–4	Canada	Alfréd Hajós National Swimming Stadium, Budapest; Referees: Sergey Naumov (RUS), Benjamin Mercier (FRA)
16 July 2017; 09:30	Report	Score by quarters: 1–2, 2–0, 3–0, 4–2			Alfréd Hajós National Swimming Stadium, Budapest; Referees: Sergey Naumov (RUS), Benjamin Mercier (FRA)
16 July 2017; 09:30	Report	Bianconi 4	Goals	Eggens 2	Alfréd Hajós National Swimming Stadium, Budapest; Referees: Sergey Naumov (RUS), Benjamin Mercier (FRA)

18 July 2017; 18:50	Report	China	8–9	Canada	Alfréd Hajós National Swimming Stadium, Budapest; Referees: Adrian Alexandrescu (ROU), Vojin Putniković (SRB)
18 July 2017; 18:50	Report	Score by quarters: 1–1, 4–2, 0–5, 3–1			Alfréd Hajós National Swimming Stadium, Budapest; Referees: Adrian Alexandrescu (ROU), Vojin Putniković (SRB)
18 July 2017; 18:50	Report	Xiong, Zhang J. 2	Goals	four players 2	Alfréd Hajós National Swimming Stadium, Budapest; Referees: Adrian Alexandrescu (ROU), Vojin Putniković (SRB)

20 July 2017; 17:30	Report	Brazil	6–16	Canada	Alfréd Hajós National Swimming Stadium, Budapest; Referees: Daniel Daners (URU), Benjamin Mercier (FRA)
20 July 2017; 17:30	Report	Score by quarters: 2–4, 1–4, 1–4, 1–4			Alfréd Hajós National Swimming Stadium, Budapest; Referees: Daniel Daners (URU), Benjamin Mercier (FRA)
20 July 2017; 17:30	Report	Ferreira 3	Goals	Christmas 5	Alfréd Hajós National Swimming Stadium, Budapest; Referees: Daniel Daners (URU), Benjamin Mercier (FRA)

Playoffs

22 July 2017; 17:30	Report	Canada	16–3	New Zealand	Alfréd Hajós National Swimming Stadium, Budapest; Referees: Natacha Florestano (BRA), Viktor Salnichenko (KAZ)
22 July 2017; 17:30	Report	Score by quarters: 5–1, 4–1, 3–0, 4–1			Alfréd Hajós National Swimming Stadium, Budapest; Referees: Natacha Florestano (BRA), Viktor Salnichenko (KAZ)
22 July 2017; 17:30	Report	Békhazi 4	Goals	three players 1	Alfréd Hajós National Swimming Stadium, Budapest; Referees: Natacha Florestano (BRA), Viktor Salnichenko (KAZ)

Quarterfinals

24 July 2017; 20:30	Report	Hungary	4–6	Canada	Alfréd Hajós National Swimming Stadium, Budapest; Referees: Alessandro Severo (ITA), Steven Rotsart (USA)
24 July 2017; 20:30	Report	Score by quarters: 0–1, 4–3, 0–1, 0–1			Alfréd Hajós National Swimming Stadium, Budapest; Referees: Alessandro Severo (ITA), Steven Rotsart (USA)
24 July 2017; 20:30	Report	four players 1	Goals	Eggens 5	Alfréd Hajós National Swimming Stadium, Budapest; Referees: Alessandro Severo (ITA), Steven Rotsart (USA)

Semifinals

26 July 2017; 22:00	Report	Canada	10–12	Spain	Alfréd Hajós National Swimming Stadium, Budapest; Referees: Georgios Stavridis (GRE), Alessandro Severo (ITA)
26 July 2017; 22:00	Report	Score by quarters: 2–4, 2–3, 2–2, 4–3			Alfréd Hajós National Swimming Stadium, Budapest; Referees: Georgios Stavridis (GRE), Alessandro Severo (ITA)
26 July 2017; 22:00	Report	Christmas, Fournier 3	Goals	Gual 5	Alfréd Hajós National Swimming Stadium, Budapest; Referees: Georgios Stavridis (GRE), Alessandro Severo (ITA)

Third place game

28 July 2017; 15:00	Report	Russia	11–9	Canada	Alfréd Hajós National Swimming Stadium, Budapest; Referees: Péter Molnár (HUN), Vojin Putniković (SRB)
28 July 2017; 15:00	Report	Score by quarters: 3–3, 4–2, 2–2, 2–2			Alfréd Hajós National Swimming Stadium, Budapest; Referees: Péter Molnár (HUN), Vojin Putniković (SRB)
28 July 2017; 15:00	Report	Ryzhkova 3	Goals	Eggens 4	Alfréd Hajós National Swimming Stadium, Budapest; Referees: Péter Molnár (HUN), Vojin Putniković (SRB)
