= Diving at the 2017 World Aquatics Championships – Mixed synchronized 10 metre platform =

Mixed synchronized 10 metre platform at the 2017 World Aquatics Championships
- Venue: Danube Arena
- Location: Budapest, Hungary
- Dates: 15 July
- Competitors: 32 from 16 nations
- Teams: 16
- Winning points: 352.98

Medalists
gold medal	Ren Qian; Lian Junjie	China
silver medal	Lois Toulson; Matty Lee	Great Britain
bronze medal	Kim Mi-rae; Hyon Il-myong	North Korea

The mixed synchronized 10 metre platform competition at the 2017 World Championships was held on 15 July 2017.

== Results ==
The final was started at 13:00.

Rank	Nation	Divers	
Rank	Nation	Divers	Points
1st place, gold medalist(s)	China	Ren Qian; Lian Junjie	352.98
2nd place, silver medalist(s)	Great Britain	Lois Toulson; Matty Lee	323.28
3rd place, bronze medalist(s)	North Korea	Kim Mi-rae; Hyon Il-myong	318.12
4	Russia	Yulia Timoshinina; Viktor Minibaev	310.08
5	Canada	Meaghan Benfeito; Nathan Zsombor-Murray	307.80
6	Japan	Minami Itahashi; Kazuki Murakami	307.74
7	Australia	Melissa Wu; Domonic Bedggood	306.30
8	Germany	Christina Wassen; Florian Fandler	302.46
9	Mexico	Viviana Del Angel; Randal Willars	301.08
10	United States	Tarrin Gilliland; Andrew Capobianco	300.12
11	Italy	Noemi Batki; Maicol Verzotto	291.54
12	Ukraine	Valeriia Liulko; Maksym Dolhov	287.34
13	Colombia	Carolina Murillo; Víctor Ortega	258.93
14	Cuba	Tuti García; Jeinkler Aguirre	256.35
15	Singapore	Lim Shen-Yan Freida; Jonathan Chan	250.68
16	Uzbekistan	Yuliya Nushtaeva; Botir Khasanov	196.20
