= South Korea at the 2017 World Aquatics Championships =

- Flag of South Korea
- FINA code: KOR
- National federation: Korean Swimming Federation
- Website: swimming.sports.or.kr

in Budapest, Hungary
- Competitors: 26 in 3 sports
- Medals: Gold 0 Silver 0 Bronze 0 Total 0

World Aquatics Championships appearances
- 1973; 1975; 1978; 1982; 1986; 1991; 1994; 1998; 2001; 2003; 2005; 2007; 2009; 2011; 2013; 2015; 2017; 2019; 2022; 2023; 2024

South Korea is scheduled to compete at the 2017 World Aquatics Championships in Budapest, Hungary from 14 July to 30 July.

== Diving ==
South Korea has entered 6 divers (two male and four female).

Men

Athlete	Event	Preliminaries		Semifinals		Final	
Athlete	Event	Points	Rank	Points	Rank	Points	Rank
Kim Yeong-nam	1 m springboard	361.15	10 Q	—		347.10	12
Woo Ha-ram	1 m springboard	360.05	=13	—		did not advance	
Kim Yeong-nam	3 m springboard	388.70	23	did not advance			
Woo Ha-ram	3 m springboard	420.10	13 Q	DNS		did not advance	
Kim Yeong-nam	10 m platform	361.10	24	did not advance			
Woo Ha-ram	10 m platform	441.30	9 Q	442.60	10 Q	435.60	10
Kim Yeong-nam; Woo Ha-ram	3 m synchronized springboard	378.75	8 Q	—		396.90	8
Kim Yeong-nam; Woo Ha-ram	10 m synchronized platform	378.36	7 Q	—		391.17	7

Women

Athlete	Event	Preliminaries		Semifinals		Final	
Athlete	Event	Points	Rank	Points	Rank	Points	Rank
Kim Na-mi	1 m springboard	237.45	23	—		did not advance	
Moon Na-yun	1 m springboard	191.45	39	—		did not advance	
Kim Na-mi	3 m springboard	281.10	15 Q	272.25	18	did not advance	
Moon Na-yun	3 m springboard	230.30	31	did not advance			
Cho Eun-bi	10 m platform	297.95	18 Q	292.10	17	did not advance	
Kim Su-ji	10 m platform	242.10	33	did not advance			
Kim Na-mi; Moon Na-yun	3 m synchronized springboard	251.88	13	—		did not advance	
Cho Eun-bi; Kim Su-ji	10 m synchronized platform	261.42	14	—		did not advance	

== Swimming ==
South Korean swimmers have achieved qualifying standards in the following events (up to a maximum of 2 swimmers in each event at the A-standard entry time, and 1 at the B-standard):

Men

Athlete	Event	Heat		Semifinal		Final	
Athlete	Event	Time	Rank	Time	Rank	Time	Rank
Joo Jae-gu	400 m individual medley	4:31.14	34	—		did not advance	
Kim Jae-youn	100 m breaststroke	1:01.86	34	did not advance			
Kim Jae-youn	200 m breaststroke	2:18.65	33	did not advance			
Kim Moon-kee	200 m butterfly	2:02.31	33	did not advance			
Park Tae-hwan	200 m freestyle	1:47.11	14 Q	1:46.28	8 Q	1:47.11	8
Park Tae-hwan	400 m freestyle	3:45.57	4 Q	—		3:44.38	4
Park Tae-hwan	1500 m freestyle	14:59.44	9	—		did not advance	
Won Young-jun	50 m backstroke	25.10	=12 Q	25.02 NR	14	did not advance	
Yang Jae-hoon	50 m freestyle	23.05	55	did not advance			
Yang Jung-doo	50 m butterfly	24.45	36	did not advance			

Women

Athlete	Event	Heat		Semifinal		Final	
Athlete	Event	Time	Rank	Time	Rank	Time	Rank
An Se-hyeon	100 m butterfly	57.83	7 Q	57.15	6 Q	57.07 NR	5
An Se-hyeon	200 m butterfly	2:08.06	=6 Q	2:07.82	8 Q	2:06.67 NR	4
Back Su-yeon	200 m breaststroke	2:26.45	13 Q	2:26.37	15	did not advance	
Choi Jung-min	800 m freestyle	8:40.87	17	—		did not advance	
Im Da-sol	100 m backstroke	1:01.07	21	did not advance			
Kim Seo-yeong	200 m backstroke	2:13.26	20	did not advance			
Kim Seo-yeong	200 m individual medley	2:11.33	7 Q	2:09.86 NR	5 Q	2:10.40	6
Kim Seo-yeong	400 m individual medley	4:39.80	9	—		did not advance	
Lee Ea-sop	200 m freestyle	1:59.38	22	did not advance			
Lee Ea-sop	400 m freestyle	4:13.94	18	—		did not advance	
Park Han-byeol	50 m backstroke	28.52	25	did not advance			
Park Su-jin	200 m butterfly	2:09.44	18	did not advance			
Park Ye-rin	50 m butterfly	26.65	=22	did not advance			
Yu Hyoun-ji	50 m backstroke	28.31	18	did not advance			

== Synchronized swimming ==
South Korea's synchronized swimming team consisted of 3 athletes (3 female).

Women

Athlete	Event	Preliminaries		Final	
Athlete	Event	Points	Rank	Points	Rank
Lee Ri-young	Solo technical routine	76.9730	16	did not advance	
Lee Ri-young	Solo free routine	77.8000	19	did not advance	
Lee Ri-young; Uhm Ji-wan; Baek Seo-yeon (R)	Duet free routine	76.4000	27	did not advance	

Legend: (R) = Reserve Athlete
