= Diving at the 2017 World Aquatics Championships – Men's 3 metre springboard =

Men's 3 metre springboard at the 2017 World Aquatics Championships
- Venue: Danube Arena
- Location: Budapest, Hungary
- Dates: 19 July (preliminaries and semifinal); 20 July (final)
- Competitors: 56 from 35 nations
- Winning points: 547.10

Medalists
gold medal	Xie Siyi	China
silver medal	Patrick Hausding	Germany
bronze medal	Ilya Zakharov	Russia

The Men's 3 metre springboard competition at the 2017 World Championships was held on 19 and 20 July 2017. In a surprise finish, the top three men from the semifinals all failed to reach the podium.

== Results ==
The preliminary round was started on 19 July at 10:00. The semifinals were held on 19 July at 15:30. The final was held on 20 July at 18:30.

Green denotes finalists

Blue denotes semifinalists

Rank	Diver	Nationality	Preliminary		Semifinal		Final	
Rank	Diver	Nationality	Points	Rank	Points	Rank	Points	Rank
1st place, gold medalist(s)	Xie Siyi	China	512.90	1	476.50	4	547.10	1
2nd place, silver medalist(s)	Patrick Hausding	Germany	447.40	5	471.70	5	526.15	2
3rd place, bronze medalist(s)	Ilya Zakharov	Russia	502.30	2	471.30	6	505.90	3
4	Rommel Pacheco	Mexico	431.75	10	478.90	3	501.60	4
5	Jack Laugher	Great Britain	477.85	3	498.75	2	500.65	5
6	Jahir Ocampo	Mexico	444.95	7	427.15	11	487.15	6
7	Oleh Kolodiy	Ukraine	418.70	14	409.95	12	470.00	7
8	Evgeny Kuznetsov	Russia	423.85	12	464.75	7	458.70	8
9	James Connor	Australia	431.90	9	462.30	8	453.80	9
10	Cao Yuan	China	452.65	4	517.45	1	453.70	10
11	Ross Haslam	Great Britain	425.70	11	433.00	10	452.90	11
12	Matthieu Rosset	France	442.35	8	443.55	9	435.70	12
13	Sho Sakai	Japan	445.65	6	407.80	13	did not advance	
14	Guillaume Dutoit	Switzerland	407.10	18	405.95	14	did not advance	
15	Illya Kvasha	Ukraine	416.30	15	405.60	15	did not advance	
16	Constantin Blaha	Austria	398.05	19	401.90	16	did not advance	
17	Philippe Gagne	Canada	410.25	16	396.90	17	did not advance	
18	Steele Johnson	United States	409.65	17	394.55	18	did not advance	
19	Woo Ha-ram	South Korea	420.10	13	did not start			
20	Michael Hixon	United States	397.45	20	did not advance			
21	Sebastián Villa	Colombia	395.40	21	did not advance			
22	Nicolás García	Spain	390.80	22	did not advance			
23	Kim Yeong-nam	South Korea	388.70	23	did not advance			
24	Giovanni Tocci	Italy	388.05	24	did not advance			
25	Rafael Quintero	Puerto Rico	386.70	25	did not advance			
26	Ooi Tze Liang	Malaysia	385.92	26	did not advance			
27	Stephan Feck	Germany	385.45	27	did not advance			
28	François Imbeau-Dulac	Canada	385.30	28	did not advance			
29	Yona Knight-Wisdom	Jamaica	385.00	29	did not advance			
30	Sebastián Morales	Colombia	383.90	30	did not advance			
31	Kevin Chávez	Australia	382.85	31	did not advance			
32	Alberto Arevalo	Spain	372.45	32	did not advance			
33	Oliver Dingley	Ireland	369.75	33	did not advance			
34	Andrzej Rzeszutek	Poland	366.75	34	did not advance			
35	Jouni Kallunki	Finland	364.55	35	did not advance			
36	Mikita Tkachou	Belarus	355.00	36	did not advance			
37	Ian Matos	Brazil	338.65	37	did not advance			
38	Joey van Etten	Netherlands	335.10	38	did not advance			
39	Yauheni Karaliou	Belarus	328.05	39	did not advance			
40	Timothy Lee	Singapore	325.65	40	did not advance			
41	Jonathan Suckow	Switzerland	325.40	41	did not advance			
42	Jesús Liranzo	Venezuela	320.80	42	did not advance			
43	Liam Stone	New Zealand	316.60	43	did not advance			
44	Ahmad Azman	Malaysia	311.15	44	did not advance			
45	Lee Mark Han Ming	Singapore	295.65	45	did not advance			
46	Ammar Hassan	Egypt	293.70	46	did not advance			
47	Youssef Ezzat	Egypt	293.35	47	did not advance			
48	Arturo Valdes	Cuba	287.40	48	did not advance			
49	Diego Carquin	Chile	285.00	49	did not advance			
50	Adriano Cristofori	Italy	284.85	50	did not advance			
51	Botond Bóta	Hungary	282.20	51	did not advance			
52	Sandro Melikidze	Georgia	281.00	52	did not advance			
53	Carlos Escalona	Cuba	265.25	53	did not advance			
54	Ábel Ligárt	Hungary	249.10	54	did not advance			
55	Donato Neglia	Chile	189.35	55	did not advance			
56	Doston Botirov	Uzbekistan	49.50	56	did not advance			
