= Diving at the 2017 World Aquatics Championships – Mixed synchronized 3 metre springboard =

Mixed synchronized 3 metre springboard at the 2017 World Aquatics Championships
- Venue: Danube Arena
- Location: Budapest, Hungary
- Dates: 22 July
- Competitors: 28 from 14 nations
- Teams: 14
- Winning points: 323.70

Medalists
| gold medal | Wang Han; Li Zheng | China |
| silver medal | Grace Reid; Tom Daley | Great Britain |
| bronze medal | Jennifer Abel; François Imbeau-Dulac | Canada |

The Mixed synchronized 3 metre springboard competition at the 2017 World Championships was held on 22 July 2017.

== Results ==
The final was started at 14:00.

| Rank | Nation | Divers | |
| Rank | Nation | Divers | Points |
|---|---|---|---|
| 1st place, gold medalist(s) | China | Wang Han; Li Zheng | 323.70 |
| 2nd place, silver medalist(s) | Great Britain | Grace Reid; Tom Daley | 308.04 |
| 3rd place, bronze medalist(s) | Canada | Jennifer Abel; François Imbeau-Dulac | 297.72 |
| 4 | Germany | Tina Punzel; Lou Massenberg | 287.76 |
| 5 | Australia | Esther Qin; Matthew Carter | 282.00 |
| 6 | Colombia | Diana Pineda; Sebastián Villa | 277.83 |
| 7 | Italy | Elena Bertocchi; Maicol Verzotto | 277.35 |
| 8 | Switzerland | Michelle Heimberg; Jonathan Suckow | 273.00 |
| 9 | Russia | Maria Polyakova; Ilia Molchanov | 270.63 |
| 10 | Ukraine | Viktoriya Kesar; Stanislav Oliferchyk | 270.06 |
| 10 | United States | Lauren Reedy; Briadam Herrera | 270.06 |
| 12 | New Zealand | Elizabeth Cui; Liam Stone | 255.90 |
| 13 | Mexico | Arantxa Chávez; Julian Sánchez | 223.80 |
| 14 | Brazil | Tammy Takagi; Ian Matos | 184.74 |
