= Swimming at the 2017 World Aquatics Championships – Women's 100 metre backstroke =

Women's 100 metre backstroke at the 2017 World Aquatics Championships
- Venue: Danube Arena
- Location: Budapest, Hungary
- Dates: 24 July (heats and semifinals); 25 July (final)
- Competitors: 59 from 52 nations
- Winning time: 58.10 WR

Medalists
gold medal	Kylie Masse	Canada
silver medal	Kathleen Baker	United States
bronze medal	Emily Seebohm	Australia

The Women's 100 metre backstroke competition at the 2017 World Championships was held on 24 and 25 July 2017.

== Records ==
Prior to the competition, the existing world and championship records were as follows.

World record	Gemma Spofforth (GBR)	58.12	Rome, Italy	28 July 2009
Competition record	Gemma Spofforth (GBR)	58.12	Rome, Italy	28 July 2009

The following new records were set during this competition.

Date	Event	Name	Nationality	Time	Record
25 July	Final	Kylie Masse	Canada	58.10	WR, CR

== Results ==
=== Heats ===
The heats were held on 24 July at 09:30.

Rank	Heat	Lane	Name	Nationality	Time	Notes
1	6	4	Kylie Masse	Canada	58.62	Q
2	5	4	Katinka Hosszú	Hungary	58.80	Q, WD
3	6	5	Emily Seebohm	Australia	58.95	Q
4	4	3	Anastasia Fesikova	Russia	59.58	Q
5	4	5	Olivia Smoliga	United States	59.70	Q
6	4	4	Kathleen Baker	United States	59.76	Q
7	6	6	Holly Barratt	Australia	59.87	Q
8	5	3	Chen Jie	China	59.88	Q
8	5	6	Kathleen Dawson	Great Britain	59.88	Q
10	4	6	Daria Ustinova	Russia	59.90	Q
11	6	3	Georgia Davies	Great Britain	1:00.24	Q
12	5	7	Simona Baumrtová	Czech Republic	1:00.28	Q
13	4	2	Hilary Caldwell	Canada	1:00.37	Q
14	4	7	Kira Toussaint	Netherlands	1:00.52	Q
14	5	5	Fu Yuanhui	China	1:00.52	Q
16	6	2	Daryna Zevina	Ukraine	1:00.59	Q
17	5	8	Mathilde Cini	France	1:00.70	Q
18	6	9	Theodora Drakou	Greece	1:00.88	
19	3	6	África Zamorano	Spain	1:00.89	
20	4	0	Margherita Panziera	Italy	1:01.03	
21	5	0	Im Da-sol	South Korea	1:01.07	
22	4	8	Alicja Tchórz	Poland	1:01.26	
23	5	1	Mimosa Jallow	Finland	1:01.33	
24	3	5	Ida Lindborg	Sweden	1:01.40	
25	4	1	Andrea Berrino	Argentina	1:01.63	
26	6	0	Gabrielle Fa'amausili	New Zealand	1:01.80	
27	3	0	Ugnė Mažutaitytė	Lithuania	1:02.02	NR
28	3	4	Fernanda González	Mexico	1:02.03	
29	4	9	Caroline Pilhatsch	Austria	1:02.10	
29	6	7	Katarína Listopadová	Slovakia	1:02.10	
31	5	9	Claudia Lau	Hong Kong	1:02.23	
32	3	1	Isabella Arcila	Colombia	1:02.24	
32	5	2	Béryl Gastaldello	France	1:02.24	
34	6	8	Ekaterina Avramova	Turkey	1:02.42	
35	6	1	Yekaterina Rudenko	Kazakhstan	1:02.51	
36	2	2	Naomi Ruele	Botswana	1:02.96	
37	3	3	Tatiana Salcutan	Moldova	1:03.08	
38	3	7	Gabriela Georgieva	Bulgaria	1:03.56	
39	3	2	Kristina Steina	Latvia	1:04.03	
40	3	8	Kimiko Raheem	Sri Lanka	1:04.06	
41	2	5	Signhild Joensen	Faroe Islands	1:04.50	
42	2	3	Lushavel Stickland	Samoa	1:04.96	
43	2	6	Robyn Lee	Zimbabwe	1:05.05	
44	2	8	Carolina Cermelli	Panama	1:05.50	
45	3	9	Karen Vilorio	Honduras	1:05.88	
46	2	7	Hiba Fahsi	Morocco	1:06.08	
47	2	0	Cheyenne Rova	Fiji	1:07.10	
48	1	4	Elodie Razafy	Madagascar	1:07.49	
49	2	4	Alexus Laird	Seychelles	1:07.67	
50	2	1	Lauren Hew	Cayman Islands	1:08.38	
51	1	6	Lea Ricart Martínez	Andorra	1:08.60	
52	1	2	Jennifer Rizkallah	Lebanon	1:10.36	
53	1	8	Britheny Joassaint	Haiti	1:12.12	
54	1	3	Nooran Ba Matraf	Yemen	1:12.38	
55	1	5	Victoria Chentsova	Northern Mariana Islands	1:14.32	
56	1	7	Yesuin Bayar	Mongolia	1:14.77	
57	1	0	Robyn Young	Eswatini	1:16.34	
58	2	9	Amanda Poppe	Guam	1:18.24	
59	1	1	Ammara Pinto	Malawi	1:20.95	

=== Semifinals ===
The semifinals were held on 24 July at 18.24.

==== Semifinal 1 ====
Rank	Lane	Name	Nationality	Time	Notes
1	4	Emily Seebohm	Australia	58.85	Q
2	5	Olivia Smoliga	United States	59.07	Q
3	6	Kathleen Dawson	Great Britain	59.82	Q
4	2	Georgia Davies	Great Britain	59.94	
5	3	Holly Barratt	Australia	59.95	
6	7	Hilary Caldwell	Canada	1:00.29	
7	1	Fu Yuanhui	China	1:00.39	
8	8	Mathilde Cini	France	1:00.44	

==== Semifinal 2 ====
Rank	Lane	Name	Nationality	Time	Notes
1	4	Kylie Masse	Canada	58.18	Q, AM
2	3	Kathleen Baker	United States	59.03	Q
3	5	Anastasia Fesikova	Russia	59.26	Q
4	7	Simona Baumrtová	Czech Republic	59.65	Q, NR
5	2	Daria Ustinova	Russia	59.74	Q
6	6	Chen Jie	China	59.85	
7	8	Daryna Zevina	Ukraine	1:00.40	
8	1	Kira Toussaint	Netherlands	1:00.76	

=== Final ===
The final was held on 25 July at 18:21.

Rank	Lane	Name	Nationality	Time	Notes
1st place, gold medalist(s)	4	Kylie Masse	Canada	58.10	WR
2nd place, silver medalist(s)	3	Kathleen Baker	United States	58.58	
3rd place, bronze medalist(s)	5	Emily Seebohm	Australia	58.59	
4	6	Olivia Smoliga	United States	58.77	
5	2	Anastasia Fesikova	Russia	58.83	
6	1	Daria Ustinova	Russia	59.50	
7	7	Simona Baumrtová	Czech Republic	59.71	
8	8	Kathleen Dawson	Great Britain	59.90	
