= Swimming at the 2017 World Aquatics Championships – Women's 50 metre backstroke =

Women's 50 metre backstroke at the 2017 World Aquatics Championships
- Venue: Danube Arena
- Location: Budapest, Hungary
- Dates: 26 July (heats and semifinals); 27 July (final)
- Competitors: 63 from 55 nations
- Winning time: 27.14

Medalists
gold medal	Etiene Medeiros	Brazil
silver medal	Fu Yuanhui	China
bronze medal	Aliaksandra Herasimenia	Belarus

The Women's 50 metre backstroke competition at the 2017 World Championships was held on 26 and 27 July 2017.

== Records ==
Prior to the competition, the existing world and championship records were as follows.

World record	Zhao Jing (CHN)	27.06	Rome, Italy	30 July 2009
Competition record	Zhao Jing (CHN)	27.06	Rome, Italy	30 July 2009

== Results ==
=== Heats ===
The heats were held on 26 July at 09:30.

Rank	Heat	Lane	Name	Nationality	Time	Notes
1	7	4	Fu Yuanhui	China	27.21	Q
2	6	4	Aliaksandra Herasimenia	Belarus	27.65	Q
2	6	5	Etiene Medeiros	Brazil	27.65	Q
4	7	6	Georgia Davies	Great Britain	27.73	Q
5	7	5	Holly Barratt	Australia	27.75	Q
6	5	4	Wang Xueer	China	27.85	Q
7	5	5	Hannah Stevens	United States	27.89	Q
8	6	6	Emily Seebohm	Australia	27.91	Q
9	6	3	Kathleen Baker	United States	27.94	Q
10	5	3	Anastasia Fesikova	Russia	27.96	Q
10	5	7	Andrea Berrino	Argentina	27.96	Q, NR
12	6	1	Mimosa Jallow	Finland	28.05	Q, NR
13	7	3	Kylie Masse	Canada	28.10	Q
14	4	4	Alicja Tchórz	Poland	28.13	Q
15	7	2	Simona Baumrtová	Czech Republic	28.15	Q
16	7	7	Theodora Drakou	Greece	28.22	Q
17	6	2	Kira Toussaint	Netherlands	28.30	
18	6	9	Yu Hyoun-ji	South Korea	28.31	
19	5	6	Maaike de Waard	Netherlands	28.42	
19	7	1	Kathleen Dawson	Great Britain	28.42	
21	6	7	Ida Lindborg	Sweden	28.44	
22	7	0	Caroline Pilhatsch	Austria	28.45	
23	5	2	Gabrielle Fa'amausili	New Zealand	28.47	
24	7	8	Aleksandra Urbańczyk	Poland	28.49	
25	5	0	Park Han-byeol	South Korea	28.52	
26	4	6	Ingibjörg Jónsdóttir	Iceland	28.53	NR
27	4	3	Isabella Arcila	Colombia	28.59	
28	4	5	Fernanda González	Mexico	28.67	NR
29	5	1	Katarína Listopadová	Slovakia	28.68	
30	5	8	Daria Ustinova	Russia	28.73	
31	6	8	Daryna Zevina	Ukraine	28.78	
32	7	9	Mathilde Cini	France	28.79	
33	4	2	Sára Jóo	Hungary	28.91	
34	6	0	Ekaterina Avramova	Turkey	29.11	
35	3	5	Naomi Ruele	Botswana	29.21	NR
36	3	4	Sigrid Sepp	Estonia	29.24	
37	4	8	Toto Wong	Hong Kong	29.27	
38	4	9	Gabriela Georgieva	Bulgaria	29.29	
39	4	0	Chen Szu-chi	Chinese Taipei	29.42	
40	4	7	Jeserik Pinto	Venezuela	29.50	
41	5	9	Yekaterina Rudenko	Kazakhstan	29.51	
42	3	6	Lushavel Stickland	Samoa	30.04	
43	3	3	Felicity Passon	Seychelles	30.32	
44	4	1	Kristina Steina	Latvia	30.36	
45	3	7	Celina Marquez	El Salvador	30.38	
46	3	2	Kalia Antoniou	Cyprus	30.59	
47	1	5	Xiomara Getrouw	Suriname	30.74	
48	3	8	Hiba Fahsi	Morocco	30.75	
49	3	9	Carolina Cermelli	Panama	30.77	
50	2	8	Mónica Ramírez	Andorra	30.96	
51	3	1	Karen Vilorio	Honduras	31.10	
52	2	4	Elodie Marion Razafy	Madagascar	31.26	
53	1	4	María José Ribera	Bolivia	31.53	
54	3	0	Jennifer Rizkallah	Lebanon	31.65	
55	2	5	Rusudan Goginashvili	Georgia	31.97	
56	2	7	Catarina Sousa	Angola	32.24	
57	1	3	Britheny Joassaint	Haiti	32.45	
58	2	9	Gisela Cossa	Mozambique	34.11	
59	2	3	Gabby Gittens	Antigua and Barbuda	34.16	
60	2	1	Robyn Young	Eswatini	35.46	
61	2	6	Amanda Poppe	Guam	35.64	
62	1	6	Tayamika Chang'anamuno	Malawi	37.87	
63	2	2	Nazlati Mohamed Andhumdine	Comoros	48.32	

=== Semifinals ===
The semifinals were held on 26 July at 17:51.

==== Semifinal 1 ====
Rank	Lane	Name	Nationality	Time	Notes
1	5	Georgia Davies	Great Britain	27.49	Q, NR
2	6	Emily Seebohm	Australia	27.51	Q
3	4	Aliaksandra Herasimenia	Belarus	27.54	Q
4	3	Wang Xueer	China	27.60	Q
5	2	Anastasia Fesikova	Russia	27.65	
6	7	Mimosa Jallow	Finland	27.95	NR
7	8	Theodora Drakou	Greece	28.13	
7	1	Alicja Tchórz	Poland	28.13	

==== Semifinal 2 ====
Rank	Lane	Name	Nationality	Time	Notes
1	5	Etiene Medeiros	Brazil	27.18	Q, AM
2	4	Fu Yuanhui	China	27.19	Q
3	2	Kathleen Baker	United States	27.48	Q, NR
4	3	Holly Barratt	Australia	27.51	Q
5	6	Hannah Stevens	United States	27.63	
6	1	Kylie Masse	Canada	27.64	NR
7	7	Andrea Berrino	Argentina	27.80	NR
8	8	Simona Baumrtová	Czech Republic	28.03	

=== Final ===
The final was held on 27 July at 18:06.

Rank	Lane	Name	Nationality	Time	Notes
1st place, gold medalist(s)	4	Etiene Medeiros	Brazil	27.14	AM
2nd place, silver medalist(s)	5	Fu Yuanhui	China	27.15	
3rd place, bronze medalist(s)	1	Aliaksandra Herasimenia	Belarus	27.23	=ER
4	2	Emily Seebohm	Australia	27.37	OC
5	3	Kathleen Baker	United States	27.50	
6	8	Wang Xueer	China	27.55	
7	7	Holly Barratt	Australia	27.60	
8	6	Georgia Davies	Great Britain	27.61	
