= Li Zheng (diver) =

Chinese diver (born 2000)

Personal information
- Nationality: China
- Born: 25 May 2000 (age 26)

Sport
- Sport: Diving
- Event(s): 1 m, 3 m, 10 m, 3 m synchro, 10 m synchro
Medal record
World Championships
Gold medal – first place	2017 Budapest	3 m mixed synchro
FINA Diving World Cup
Gold medal – first place	2018 Wuhan	3 m mixed synchro

Li Zheng (Chinese: 李政; born 25 Mai 2000) is a Chinese diver.

Li won all four legs of the 2017 FINA Diving World Series in the 3 metre springboard mixed synchronized event together with Wang Han. At the 2017 World Aquatics Championships in Budapest Li and Wang became world champions in mixed synchronized diving from the 3 metre springboard.

In 2018 Li and Wang won gold at the 2018 FINA Diving World Cup. Li also participated in the 2018 FINA World Junior Diving Championships, where he won gold at the synchronized diving 10 metre platform event together with Lian Junjie, silver at the 1 metre springboard event and bronze at the 10 metre platform event.
