= Swimming at the 2017 World Aquatics Championships – Men's 100 metre butterfly =

Men's 100 metre butterfly at the 2017 World Aquatics Championships
- Venue: Danube Arena
- Location: Budapest, Hungary
- Dates: 28 July (heats and semifinals); 29 July (final)
- Competitors: 73 from 66 nations
- Winning time: 49.86

Medalists
gold medal	Caeleb Dressel	United States
silver medal	Kristóf Milák	Hungary
bronze medal	Joseph Schooling	Singapore
bronze medal	James Guy	Great Britain

The Men's 100 metre butterfly competition at the 2017 World Championships was held on 28 and 29 July 2017.

== Records ==
Prior to the competition, the existing world and championship records were as follows.

World record	Michael Phelps (USA)	49.82	Rome, Italy	1 August 2009
Competition record	Michael Phelps (USA)	49.82	Rome, Italy	1 August 2009

== Results ==
=== Heats ===
The heats were held on 28 July at 10:10.

Rank	Heat	Lane	Name	Nationality	Time	Notes
1	6	4	Caeleb Dressel	United States	50.08	Q
2	6	3	Piero Codia	Italy	51.09	Q, NR
3	7	6	James Guy	Great Britain	51.16	Q
4	8	4	Joseph Schooling	Singapore	51.21	Q
5	8	6	Kristóf Milák	Hungary	51.23	Q, WJ
6	8	5	Chad le Clos	South Africa	51.28	Q
7	7	3	Mehdy Metella	France	51.46	Q
8	6	6	Henrique Martins	Brazil	51.48	Q
9	7	5	Konrad Czerniak	Poland	51.50	Q
10	7	4	László Cseh	Hungary	51.55	Q
11	6	5	Li Zhuhao	China	51.62	Q
12	7	2	Grant Irvine	Australia	51.67	Q
13	6	7	Jan Świtkowski	Poland	51.82	Q
14	8	8	Aleksandr Popkov	Russia	51.84	Q
15	8	2	David Morgan	Australia	51.90	Q
16	8	3	Tim Phillips	United States	51.96	Q
17	7	0	Mathys Goosen	Netherlands	52.12	
18	8	1	Quah Zheng Wen	Singapore	52.13	
19	5	6	Sebastian Sabo	Serbia	52.16	
20	7	7	Yuki Kobori	Japan	52.17	
21	7	8	Luis Martínez	Guatemala	52.18	
22	6	2	Marius Kusch	Germany	52.22	
23	7	1	Daniil Pakhomov	Russia	52.47	
24	4	1	Kaan Ayar	Turkey	52.52	
25	6	1	Santiago Grassi	Argentina	52.59	
26	5	2	Jan Šefl	Czech Republic	52.65	
27	5	0	Louis Croenen	Belgium	52.74	
28	7	9	Dylan Carter	Trinidad and Tobago	52.75	
29	8	7	Pavel Sankovich	Belarus	52.87	
30	6	9	Andreas Vazaios	Greece	52.88	
31	4	2	Artyom Kozlyuk	Uzbekistan	52.95	
32	6	8	Liubomyr Lemeshko	Ukraine	52.97	
33	6	0	Viktor Bromer	Denmark	53.01	
34	5	3	Josiah Binnema	Canada	53.10	
35	8	0	Giacomo Carini	Italy	53.13	
36	8	9	Marcus Schlesinger	Israel	53.20	
37	4	4	Adilbek Mussin	Kazakhstan	53.37	
38	4	3	Nils Liess	Switzerland	53.50	
39	4	7	Ben Hockin	Paraguay	53.51	
40	4	0	Riku Pöytäkivi	Finland	53.62	
41	5	1	Antani Ivanov	Bulgaria	53.66	
41	5	4	Triady Fauzi Sidiq	Indonesia	53.66	
43	5	5	Kregor Zirk	Estonia	53.70	
44	5	9	Brendan Hyland	Ireland	53.80	
45	4	8	Marcos Lavado	Venezuela	53.97	
45	5	7	Tadas Duškinas	Lithuania	53.97	
47	3	2	Chou Wei-liang	Chinese Taipei	54.31	
48	3	3	Sajan Prakash	India	54.46	
49	3	4	David Arias	Colombia	54.48	
50	4	9	José Martínez	Mexico	54.50	
51	5	8	Omar Eissa	Egypt	54.59	
52	4	5	Hoàng Quý Phước	Vietnam	54.76	
53	3	5	Ralph Goveia	Zambia	54.86	
54	3	7	Christian Sperandio Sánchez	Dominican Republic	54.98	
55	3	6	Cherantha de Silva	Sri Lanka	55.09	
56	3	0	Mehdi Ansari	Iran	55.31	
57	2	4	Mikhail Umnov	Malta	55.58	
58	3	9	Rami Anis	FINA Independent Athletes	55.66	
59	3	8	Bryan Alvarez	Costa Rica	55.85	
60	3	1	Ayman Kelzi	Syria	56.59	
61	2	3	Jeerakit Soammanus	Thailand	56.88	
62	2	5	Oumar Toure	Mali	57.52	
63	2	1	Ifeakachuku Nmor	Nigeria	57.90	
64	1	3	Abdullah Al-Doori	Iraq	58.01	
65	2	2	George Jabbour	Honduras	58.29	
66	1	5	Yacob Al-Khulaifi	Qatar	58.42	
67	2	6	Hannibal Gaskin	Guyana	58.69	
68	1	4	Daniel Francisco	Angola	58.79	
69	1	6	Tanner Poppe	Guam	1:03.28	
70	2	9	Simanga Dlamini	Eswatini	1:04.02	
71	2	7	David Roberto	Northern Mariana Islands	1:06.80	
72	2	0	Dillon Gooding	Saint Vincent and the Grenadines	1:07.11	
	4	6	Sam Perry	New Zealand	DNS	

=== Semifinals ===
The semifinals were held on 28 July at 18:35.

==== Semifinal 1 ====
Rank	Lane	Name	Nationality	Time	Notes
1	5	Joseph Schooling	Singapore	50.78	Q
2	2	László Cseh	Hungary	51.16	Q
3	7	Grant Irvine	Australia	51.31	Q
4	8	Tim Phillips	United States	51.41	
5	4	Piero Codia	Italy	51.45	
6	6	Henrique Martins	Brazil	51.47	
7	3	Chad le Clos	South Africa	51.48	
8	1	Aleksandr Popkov	Russia	52.00	

==== Semifinal 2 ====
Rank	Lane	Name	Nationality	Time	Notes
1	4	Caeleb Dressel	United States	50.07	Q
2	5	James Guy	Great Britain	50.67	Q, NR
3	3	Kristóf Milák	Hungary	50.77	Q, WJ, NR
4	6	Mehdy Metella	France	51.06	Q, NR
5	7	Li Zhuhao	China	51.29	Q
6	2	Konrad Czerniak	Poland	51.60	
7	8	David Morgan	Australia	51.73	
8	1	Jan Świtkowski	Poland	52.02	

=== Final ===
The final was held on 29 July at 18:13.

Rank	Lane	Name	Nationality	Time	Notes
1st place, gold medalist(s)	4	Caeleb Dressel	United States	49.86	
2nd place, silver medalist(s)	3	Kristóf Milák	Hungary	50.62	WJ, NR
3rd place, bronze medalist(s)	6	Joseph Schooling	Singapore	50.83	
3rd place, bronze medalist(s)	5	James Guy	Great Britain	50.83	
5	7	László Cseh	Hungary	50.92	
6	1	Li Zhuhao	China	50.96	
7	8	Grant Irvine	Australia	51.00	
8	2	Mehdy Metella	France	51.16	
