= Germany at the 2017 World Aquatics Championships =

- Flag of Germany
- World Aquatics code: GER
- National federation: Deutscher Schwimm-Verband
- Website: www.dsv.de/home

in Budapest, Hungary
- Competitors: 51 in 5 sports
- Medals Ranked 19th: Gold 0 Silver 2 Bronze 1 Total 3

World Aquatics Championships appearances
- 1991; 1994; 1998; 2001; 2003; 2005; 2007; 2009; 2011; 2013; 2015; 2017; 2019; 2022; 2023; 2024; 2025

Other related appearances
- East Germany (1973–1986); West Germany (1973–1986)

Germany is scheduled to compete at the 2017 World Aquatics Championships in Budapest, Hungary from 14 July to 30 July.

== Medalists ==
Medal	Name	Sport	Event	Date
Silver	Patrick Hausding	Diving	Men's 3 m springboard	July 20
Silver	Franziska Hentke	Swimming	Women's 200 m butterfly	July 27
Bronze	Patrick Hausding; Sascha Klein	Diving	Men's 10 m synchronized platform	July 17

== Diving ==
Germany has entered 12 divers (six male and six female).

Men

Athlete	Event	Preliminaries		Semifinals		Final	
Athlete	Event	Points	Rank	Points	Rank	Points	Rank
Patrick Hausding	1 m springboard	403.80	4 Q	—N/a		439.25	4
Lou Massenberg	1 m springboard	300.85	35	—N/a		did not advance	
Stephan Feck	3 m springboard	385.45	27	did not advance			
Patrick Hausding	3 m springboard	447.40	5 Q	471.70	5 Q	526.15	2nd place, silver medalist(s)
Timo Barthel	10 m platform	413.90	14 Q	378.05	14	did not advance	
Florian Fandler	10 m platform	375.05	23	did not advance			
Stephan Feck; Patrick Hausding	3 m synchronized springboard	397.65	7 Q	—N/a		415.35	5
Patrick Hausding; Sascha Klein	10 m synchronized platform	412.92	5 Q	—N/a		440.82	3rd place, bronze medalist(s)

Women

Athlete	Event	Preliminaries		Semifinals		Final	
Athlete	Event	Points	Rank	Points	Rank	Points	Rank
Tina Punzel	1 m springboard	261.90	5 Q	—N/a		284.25	6
Louisa Stawczynski	1 m springboard	254.70	9 Q	—N/a		277.15	8
Friederike Freyer	3 m springboard	212.40	39	did not advance			
Tina Punzel	3 m springboard	220.30	35	did not advance			
Maria Kurjo	10 m platform	304.50	14 Q	306.30	13	did not advance	
Christina Wassen	10 m platform	303.25	16 Q	299.40	14	did not advance	
Friederike Freyer; Tina Punzel	3 m synchronized springboard	269.10	10 Q	—N/a		279.60	9
Christina Wassen; Elena Wassen	10 m synchronized platform	257.94	15	—N/a		did not advance	

Mixed

Athlete	Event	Final	
Athlete	Event	Points	Rank
Tina Punzel; Lou Massenberg	3 m synchronized springboard	287.76	4
Christina Wassen; Florian Fandler	10 m synchronized platform	302.46	8
Maria Kurjo; Patrick Hausding	Team	379.55	4

== High diving ==
Germany qualified two female high divers.

Athlete	Event	Points	Rank
Anna Bader	Women's high diving	283.40	5
Iris Schmidbauer	Women's high diving	218.20	10

== Open water swimming ==
Germany has entered ten open water swimmers

Athlete	Event	Time	Rank
Marcus Herwig	Men's 5 km	55:13.9	27
Soren Meißner	Men's 25 km	5:06:20.4	11
Rob Muffels	Men's 10 km	1:52:38.1	=25
Christian Reichert	Men's 10 km	1:52:29.3	12
Ruwen Straub	Men's 5 km	55:13.7	26
Andreas Waschburger	Men's 25 km	5:06:14.1	10
Leonie Beck	Women's 5 km	1:01:26.4	24
Sarah Bosslet	Women's 25 km	5:33:19.7	14
Angela Maurer	Women's 10 km	2:01:53.3	14
Angela Maurer	Women's 25 km	did not start	
Finnia Wunram	Women's 5 km	59:32.1	11
Finnia Wunram	Women's 10 km	2:00:26.1	7
Leonie Beck; Finnia Wunram; Soren Meissner; Rob Muffels	Mixed team	55:41.8	8

== Swimming ==
German swimmers have achieved qualifying standards in the following events (up to a maximum of 2 swimmers in each event at the A-standard entry time, and 1 at the B-standard):

Men

Athlete	Event	Heat		Semifinal		Final	
Athlete	Event	Time	Rank	Time	Rank	Time	Rank
Jacob Heidtmann	400 m individual medley	4:17.68	13	—N/a		did not advance	
Philip Heintz	200 m individual medley	1:58.99	7 Q	1:57.27	6 Q	1:57.43	7
Marco Koch	200 m breaststroke	2:10.40	13 Q	2:09.61	11	did not advance	
Marius Kusch	100 m butterfly	52.22	22	did not advance			
Clemens Rapp	200 m freestyle	1:47.69	20	did not advance			
Marek Ulrich	50 m backstroke	25.27	20	did not advance			
Marek Ulrich	100 m backstroke	54.90	22	did not advance			
Christian vom Lehn	50 m breaststroke	27.68	23	did not advance			
Christian vom Lehn	100 m breaststroke	1:00.60	25	did not advance			
Damian Wierling	50 m freestyle	22.00	11 Q	21.93	12	did not advance	
Damian Wierling	100 m freestyle	49.07	25	did not advance			
Damian Wierling	50 m butterfly	24.09	28	did not advance			
Florian Wellbrock	800 m freestyle	7:50.89	7 Q	—N/a		7:52.27	7
Florian Wellbrock	1500 m freestyle	15:07.43	17	—N/a		did not advance	
Poul Zellmann	200 m freestyle	1:48.67	34	did not advance			
Poul Zellmann	400 m freestyle	3:50.88	20	—N/a		did not advance	
Jacob Heidtmann; Philip Heintz; Clemens Rapp; Poul Zellmann	4 × 200 m freestyle relay	7:11.03	9	—N/a		did not advance	
Marius Kusch; Marek Ulrich; Christian vom Lehn; Damian Wierling	4 × 100 m medley relay	3:35.26	13	—N/a		did not advance	

Women

Athlete	Event	Heat		Semifinal		Final	
Athlete	Event	Time	Rank	Time	Rank	Time	Rank
Lisa Graf	200 m backstroke	2:10.10	13 Q	2:09.00	11	did not advance	
Franziska Hentke	200 m butterfly	2:08.06	6 Q	2:06.29	1 Q	2:05.39	2nd place, silver medalist(s)
Celine Rieder	800 m freestyle	8:34.16	11	—N/a		did not advance	
Celine Rieder	1500 m freestyle	16:25.99	12	—N/a		did not advance	
Aliena Schmidtke	50 m butterfly	25.73	4 Q	25.68 NR	6 Q	26.08	8
Aliena Schmidtke	100 m butterfly	58.24	12 Q	57.87	10	did not advance	

Mixed

Athlete	Event	Heat		Final	
Athlete	Event	Time	Rank	Time	Rank
Marco Koch; Marius Kusch*; Christian vom Lehn*; Lisa Graf; Aliena Schmidtke; Damian Wierling	4 × 100 m medley relay	3:47.66	8 Q	3:46.03	7

== Synchronized swimming ==
Germany's synchronized swimming team consisted of 13 athletes (1 male and 12 female).

Women

Athlete	Event	Preliminaries		Final	
Athlete	Event	Points	Rank	Points	Rank
Michelle Zimmer	Solo technical routine	76.8697	17	did not advance	
Marlene Bojer	Solo free routine	79.6000	16	did not advance	
Marlene Bojer; Daniela Reinhardt	Duet technical routine	77.4030	21	did not advance	
Marlene Bojer; Daniela Reinhardt	Duet free routine	79.9667	19	did not advance	
Marlene Bojer; Amelie Ebert; Annalisa Engheben; Lisa Konigsbauer; Franziska Moser; Daniela Reinhardt; Pia Sarnes; Veronika Sepp (R); Sinja Weychardt (R); Michelle Zimmer	Team technical routine	76.9929	15	did not advance	
Delia Artus (R); Marlene Bojer; Amelie Ebert; Annalisa Engheben (R); Lisa Konigsbauer; Franziska Moser; Daniela Reinhardt; Lisa-Sofie Rinke; Pia Sarnes; Veronika Sepp; Sinja Weychardt; Michelle Zimmer	Free routine combination	79.1000	13	did not advance	

Mixed

Athlete	Event	Preliminaries		Final	
Athlete	Event	Points	Rank	Points	Rank
Amelie Ebert; Niklas Stoepel	Duet technical routine	72.6988	8 Q	70.3147	8
Amelie Ebert; Niklas Stoepel	Duet free routine	73.9667	9 Q	74.5000	9

Legend: (R) = Reserve Athlete
