= Swimming at the 2017 World Aquatics Championships – Men's 50 metre backstroke =

Men's 50 metre backstroke at the 2017 World Aquatics Championships
- Venue: Danube Arena
- Location: Budapest, Hungary
- Dates: 29 July (heats and semifinals); 30 July (final)
- Competitors: 55 from 46 nations
- Winning time: 24.35

Medalists
| gold medal | Camille Lacourt | France |
| silver medal | Junya Koga | Japan |
| bronze medal | Matt Grevers | United States |

The Men's 50 metre backstroke competition at the 2017 World Championships was held on 29 and 30 July 2017.

== Records ==
Prior to the competition, the existing world and championship records were as follows.

| World record | Liam Tancock (GBR) | 24.04 | Rome, Italy | 2 August 2009 |
| Competition record | Liam Tancock (GBR) | 24.04 | Rome, Italy | 2 August 2009 |

== Results ==
=== Heats ===
The heats were held on 29 July at 09:51.

| Rank | Heat | Lane | Name | Nationality | Time | Notes |
|---|---|---|---|---|---|---|
| 1 | 6 | 5 | Junya Koga | Japan | 24.54 | Q |
| 2 | 5 | 4 | Camille Lacourt | France | 24.58 | Q |
| 3 | 6 | 4 | Xu Jiayu | China | 24.78 | Q |
| 3 | 7 | 5 | Matt Grevers | United States | 24.78 | Q |
| 5 | 5 | 3 | Jérémy Stravius | France | 24.80 | Q |
| 6 | 7 | 7 | Jonatan Kopelev | Israel | 24.86 | Q |
| 6 | 7 | 4 | Justin Ress | United States | 24.86 | Q |
| 8 | 5 | 5 | Grigoriy Tarasevich | Russia | 24.88 | Q |
| 9 | 5 | 6 | Richárd Bohus | Hungary | 24.93 | Q |
| 10 | 6 | 6 | Pavel Sankovich | Belarus | 24.94 | Q, NR |
| 11 | 5 | 1 | Apostolos Christou | Greece | 24.99 | Q |
| 12 | 5 | 0 | Won Young-jun | South Korea | 25.10 | Q |
| 12 | 7 | 3 | Tomasz Polewka | Poland | 25.10 | Q |
| 14 | 6 | 3 | Guilherme Guido | Brazil | 25.13 | Q |
| 15 | 4 | 3 | Javier Acevedo | Canada | 25.16 | Q |
| 16 | 6 | 1 | I Gede Siman Sudartawa | Indonesia | 25.17 | Q |
| 17 | 6 | 2 | Kliment Kolesnikov | Russia | 25.23 | |
| 18 | 6 | 8 | Matteo Milli | Italy | 25.24 | |
| 18 | 7 | 6 | Mitch Larkin | Australia | 25.24 | |
| 20 | 7 | 2 | Marek Ulrich | Germany | 25.27 | |
| 21 | 7 | 8 | Bohdan Kasian | Ukraine | 25.31 | |
| 22 | 5 | 8 | Josh Beaver | Australia | 25.44 | |
| 23 | 5 | 2 | Shane Ryan | Ireland | 25.48 | |
| 24 | 6 | 7 | Guy Barnea | Israel | 25.52 | |
| 25 | 4 | 4 | Mohamed Samy | Egypt | 25.55 | |
| 25 | 7 | 1 | Viktar Staselovich | Belarus | 25.55 | |
| 27 | 4 | 6 | Charles Hockin | Paraguay | 25.56 | |
| 27 | 5 | 7 | Gábor Balog | Hungary | 25.56 | |
| 27 | 6 | 0 | Dmytro Gurnytskyi | Ukraine | 25.56 | |
| 30 | 7 | 9 | Quah Zheng Wen | Singapore | 25.58 | |
| 31 | 7 | 0 | Kacper Stokowski | Poland | 25.63 | |
| 32 | 6 | 9 | Lê Nguyễn Paul | Vietnam | 25.64 | |
| 33 | 4 | 8 | Markus Lie | Norway | 25.71 | |
| 34 | 4 | 5 | Ralf Tribuntsov | Estonia | 25.78 | |
| 35 | 5 | 9 | Gytis Stankevičius | Lithuania | 25.90 | |
| 36 | 4 | 2 | Robinson Molina | Venezuela | 25.94 | |
| 37 | 4 | 7 | Daniel Hunter | New Zealand | 26.02 | |
| 38 | 4 | 9 | Gabriel Lópes | Portugal | 26.05 | |
| 39 | 3 | 4 | Girts Feldberg | Latvia | 26.27 | |
| 40 | 3 | 3 | Christopher Courtis | Barbados | 26.42 | |
| 41 | 3 | 5 | Mehdi Benbara | Algeria | 26.57 | |
| 42 | 3 | 6 | Driss Lahrichi | Morocco | 26.60 | |
| 43 | 3 | 7 | Madhu Prathapan | India | 27.17 | |
| 44 | 3 | 2 | David van der Colff | Botswana | 27.67 | |
| 45 | 3 | 1 | Narang Pornsiriporn | Thailand | 27.84 | |
| 46 | 2 | 7 | Juwel Ahmmed | Bangladesh | 28.50 | |
| 47 | 1 | 4 | Muhammad Khan | Pakistan | 28.97 | |
| 48 | 3 | 8 | Jayhan Odlum-Smith | Saint Lucia | 29.95 | |
| 49 | 3 | 0 | Nabeel Hatoum | Palestine | 30.69 | |
| 50 | 1 | 3 | Thol Thoeun | Cambodia | 30.72 | |
| 51 | 2 | 6 | Santisouk Inthavong | Laos | 31.96 | |
| 52 | 2 | 1 | Billy-Scott Irakose | Burundi | 33.14 | |
| 53 | 2 | 8 | Ramziyor Khorkashov | Tajikistan | 33.89 | |
| 54 | 2 | 5 | Ebrahim Al-Maleki | Yemen | 34.07 | |
| 55 | 3 | 9 | Ablam Awoussou | Benin | 34.47 | |
| | 1 | 5 | Adama Ndir | Senegal | DNS | |
| | 2 | 4 | Moris Beale | Sierra Leone | DNS | |
| | 2 | 2 | Chaoili Aonzoudine | Comoros | DNS | |
| | 2 | 3 | Tano Atta | Ivory Coast | DNS | |
| | 4 | 0 | Omar Pinzón | Colombia | DNS | |

=== Semifinals ===
The semifinals were held on 29 July at 18:45.

==== Semifinal 1 ====
| Rank | Lane | Name | Nationality | Time | Notes |
|---|---|---|---|---|---|
| 1 | 4 | Camille Lacourt | France | 24.30 | Q |
| 2 | 5 | Matt Grevers | United States | 24.65 | Q |
| 3 | 2 | Pavel Sankovich | Belarus | 24.74 | Q, NR |
| 4 | 3 | Jonatan Kopelev | Israel | 24.84 | Q |
| 5 | 6 | Grigoriy Tarasevich | Russia | 24.86 | |
| 6 | 1 | Guilherme Guido | Brazil | 24.91 | |
| 7 | 7 | Won Young-jun | South Korea | 25.02 | NR |
| 8 | 8 | I Gede Siman Sudartawa | Indonesia | 25.04 | NR |

==== Semifinal 2 ====
| Rank | Lane | Name | Nationality | Time | Notes |
|---|---|---|---|---|---|
| 1 | 4 | Junya Koga | Japan | 24.44 | Q |
| 2 | 5 | Xu Jiayu | China | 24.67 | Q |
| 3 | 6 | Justin Ress | United States | 24.70 | Q |
| 4 | 3 | Jérémy Stravius | France | 24.81 | Q |
| 5 | 2 | Richárd Bohus | Hungary | 24.88 | |
| 5 | 7 | Apostolos Christou | Greece | 24.88 | |
| 7 | 1 | Tomasz Polewka | Poland | 24.95 | |
| 8 | 8 | Javier Acevedo | Canada | 25.13 | =NR |

=== Final ===
The final was held on 30 July at 18:05.

| Rank | Lane | Name | Nationality | Time | Notes |
|---|---|---|---|---|---|
| 1st place, gold medalist(s) | 4 | Camille Lacourt | France | 24.35 | |
| 2nd place, silver medalist(s) | 5 | Junya Koga | Japan | 24.51 | |
| 3rd place, bronze medalist(s) | 3 | Matt Grevers | United States | 24.56 | |
| 4 | 1 | Jérémy Stravius | France | 24.61 | |
| 5 | 6 | Xu Jiayu | China | 24.74 | |
| 6 | 2 | Justin Ress | United States | 24.77 | |
| 7 | 7 | Pavel Sankovich | Belarus | 24.83 | |
| 8 | 8 | Jonatan Kopelev | Israel | 24.85 | |
