= Mexico at the 2017 World Aquatics Championships =

- Flag of Mexico
- World Aquatics code: MEX
- National federation: Federación Mexicana de Natación
- Website: www.fmn.org.mx

in Budapest, Hungary
- Competitors: 46 in 5 sports
- Medals Ranked 20th: Gold 0 Silver 2 Bronze 0 Total 2

World Aquatics Championships appearances
- 1973; 1975; 1978; 1982; 1986; 1991; 1994; 1998; 2001; 2003; 2005; 2007; 2009; 2011; 2013; 2015; 2017; 2019; 2022; 2023; 2024; 2025

Mexico competed at the 2017 World Aquatics Championships in Budapest, Hungary from 14 July to 30 July.

== Medalists ==
Medal	Name	Sport	Event	Date
Silver	Viviana del Ángel; Rommel Pacheco	Diving	Mixed team	July 18
Silver	Adriana Jiménez	High diving	Women's high diving	July 29

== Diving ==
Mexico entered 16 divers (nine male and seven female).

Men

Athlete	Event	Preliminaries		Semifinals		Final	
Athlete	Event	Points	Rank	Points	Rank	Points	Rank
Jahir Ocampo	1 m springboard	361.05	11 Q	—N/a		379.00	8
Adán Zúñiga	1 m springboard	322.80	27	—N/a		did not advance	
Jahir Ocampo	3 m springboard	444.95	7 Q	427.15	11 Q	487.15	6
Rommel Pacheco	3 m springboard	431.75	10 Q	478.90	3 Q	501.60	4
Andrés Villarreal	10 m platform	414.55	13 Q	379.95	16	did not advance	
Randal Willars	10 m platform	441.85	8 Q	463.25	9 Q	452.35	9
Rodrigo Diego López; Adán Zúñiga	3 m synchronized springboard	383.88	10 Q	—N/a		397.17	7
José Balleza; Kevin Berlin	10 m synchronized platform	411.72	6 Q	—N/a		378.48	10

Women

Athlete	Event	Preliminaries		Semifinals		Final	
Athlete	Event	Points	Rank	Points	Rank	Points	Rank
Arantxa Chávez	1 m springboard	249.50	11 Q	—N/a		272.30	10
Dolores Hernández	1 m springboard	246.90	12 Q	—N/a		257.20	11
Arantxa Chávez	3 m springboard	266.10	18 Q	278.25	15	did not advance	
Dolores Hernández	3 m springboard	293.00	9 Q	285.05	14	did not advance	
Gabriela Agúndez	10 m platform	310.95	11 Q	297.35	15	did not advance	
Montserrat Gutiérrez	10 m platform	247.05	32	did not advance			
Arantxa Chávez; Melany Hernández	3 m synchronized springboard	274.62	7 Q	—N/a		279.27	10
Gabriela Agúndez; Samantha Jiménez	10 m synchronized platform	284.46	8 Q	—N/a		290.58	9

Mixed

Athlete	Event	Final	
Athlete	Event	Points	Rank
Arantxa Chávez; Julián Sánchez	3 m synchronized springboard	223.80	13
Viviana del Ángel; Randal Willars	10 m synchronized platform	301.08	9
Viviana del Ángel; Rommel Pacheco	Team	402.35	2nd place, silver medalist(s)

== High diving ==
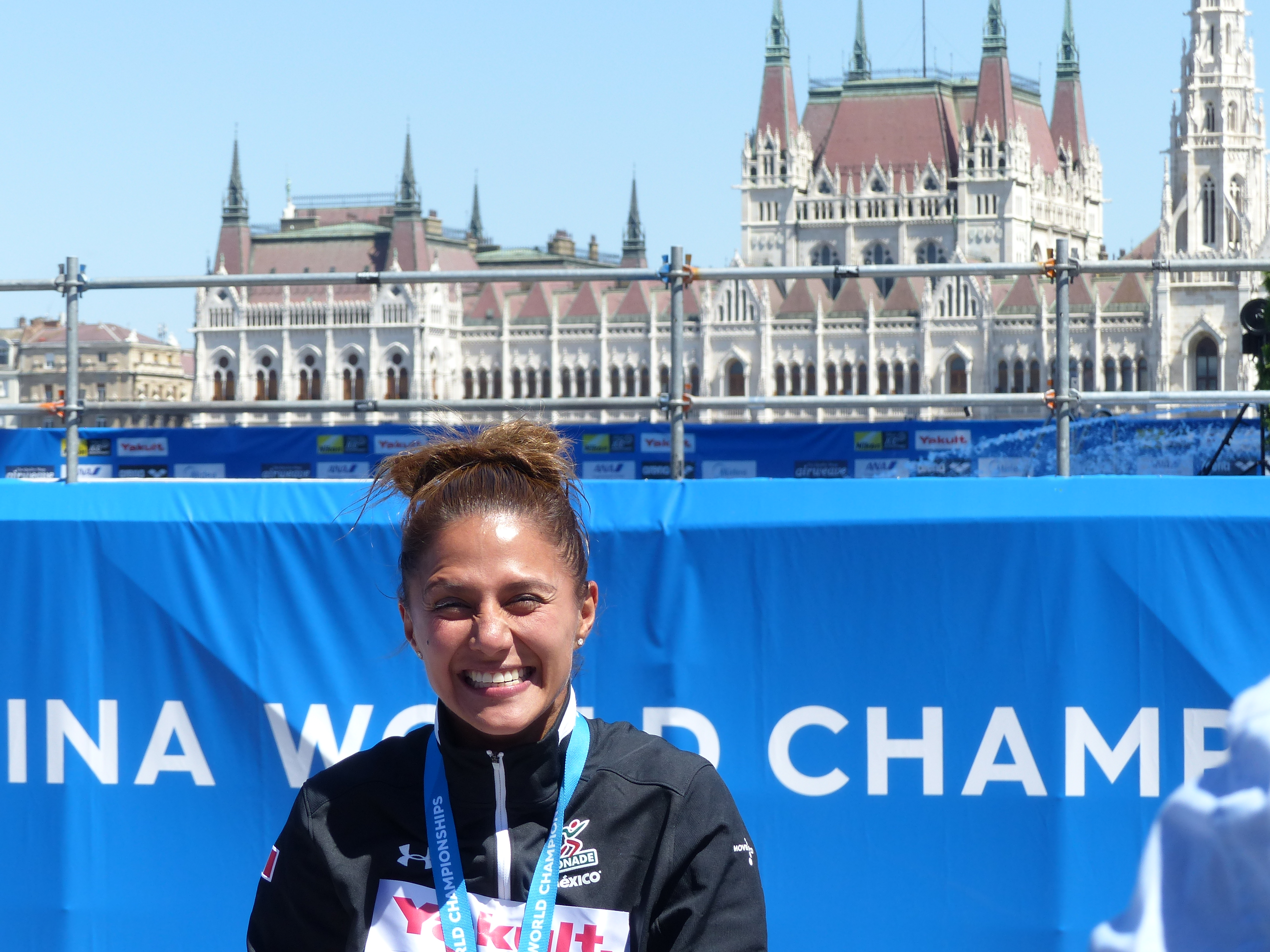
Adriana Jimenez

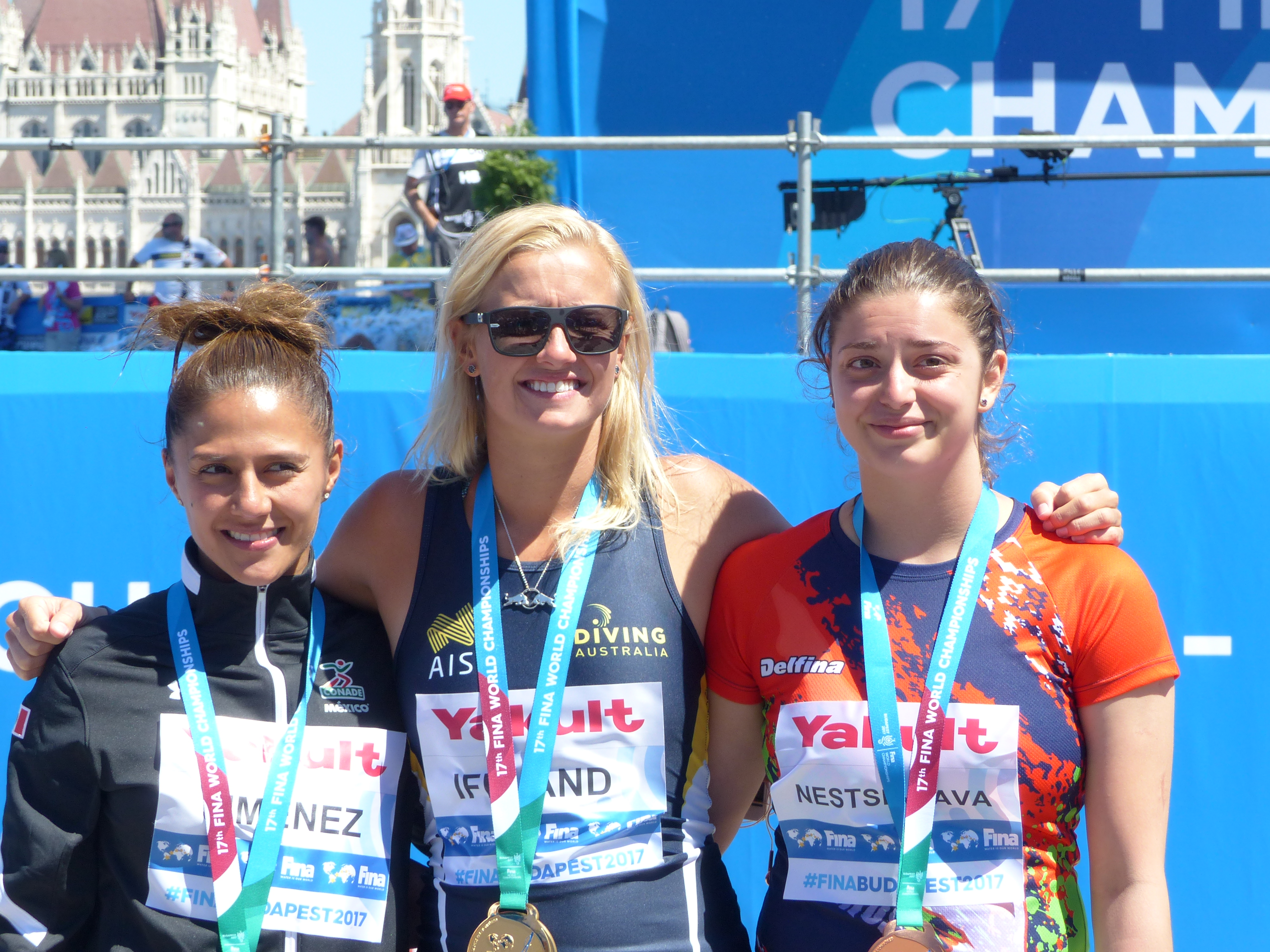
Rhiannan Iffland, Adriana Jimenez, Yana Nestsiarava

Mexico qualified two male and one female high divers.

Athlete	Event	Points	Rank
Sergio Guzmán	Men's high diving	329.00	12
Jonathan Paredes	Men's high diving	343.25	8
Adriana Jiménez	Women's high diving	308.90	2nd place, silver medalist(s)

== Open water swimming ==
Mexico has entered six open water swimmers

Athlete	Event	Time	Rank
Fernando Betanzos	Men's 5 km	57:04.2	46
Fernando Betanzos	Men's 10 km	1:58:16.0	47
Arturo Pérez Vertti	Men's 10 km	2:00:53.4	52
Alfredo Villa	Men's 5 km	59:14.5	50
Martha Aguilar	Women's 5 km	1:02:04.9	36
Martha Aguilar	Women's 10 km	2:08:35.2	38
María José Mata	Women's 5 km	1:02:02.5	31
Martha Sandoval	Women's 10 km	2:17:48.2	53
María José Mata; Martha Sandoval; Arturo Pérez Vertti; Alfredo Villa	Mixed team	58:32.5	17

== Swimming ==
Mexican swimmers have achieved qualifying standards in the following events (up to a maximum of 2 swimmers in each event at the A-standard entry time, and 1 at the B-standard):

Men

Athlete	Event	Heat		Semifinal		Final	
Athlete	Event	Time	Rank	Time	Rank	Time	Rank
Miguel de Lara	50 m breaststroke	28.29	40	did not advance			
Miguel de Lara	100 m breaststroke	1:01.93	37	did not advance			
Miguel de Lara	200 m breaststroke	2:13.35	23	did not advance			
José Martínez	100 m butterfly	54.50	50	did not advance			
José Martínez	200 m individual medley	2:06.00	36	did not advance			
Daniel Ramírez	50 m freestyle	23.19	57	did not advance			
Daniel Ramírez	100 m freestyle	50.54	55	did not advance			
Ricardo Vargas	400 m freestyle	3:53.63	31	—N/a		did not advance	
Ricardo Vargas	800 m freestyle	8:04.17	22	—N/a		did not advance	
Ricardo Vargas	1500 m freestyle	15:24.79	27	—N/a		did not advance	
Ricardo Vargas	400 m individual medley	4:30.37	32	—N/a		did not advance	

Women

Athlete	Event	Heat		Semifinal		Final	
Athlete	Event	Time	Rank	Time	Rank	Time	Rank
Esther González	200 m breaststroke	2:28.71	18	did not advance			
Fernanda González	50 m backstroke	28.67	28	did not advance			
Fernanda González	100 m backstroke	1:02.03	28	did not advance			
Fernanda González	200 m backstroke	2:17.03	26	did not advance			
Monika González	200 m individual medley	2:16.11	27	did not advance			
Monika González	400 m individual medley	4:48.00	21	—N/a		did not advance	
Liliana Ibáñez	50 m freestyle	25.84	36	did not advance			
Liliana Ibáñez	100 m freestyle	57.40	40	did not advance			
Ayumi Macías	800 m freestyle	9:08.78	34	—N/a		did not advance	
María José Mata	200 m butterfly	2:12.82	24	did not advance			
Esther González; Fernanda González; Liliana Ibáñez; María José Mata	4×100 m medley relay	4:12.04	16	—N/a		did not advance	

Mixed

Athlete	Event	Heat		Final	
Athlete	Event	Time	Rank	Time	Rank
Miguel de Lara; Daniel Ramírez; Fernanda González; Liliana Ibáñez	4×100 m medley relay	3:54.74	11	did not advance	

== Synchronized swimming ==
Mexico's synchronized swimming team consisted of 12 athletes (12 female).

Women

Athlete	Event	Preliminaries		Final	
Athlete	Event	Points	Rank	Points	Rank
Joana Jiménez	Solo technical routine	82.0066	10 Q	82.4507	10
Karem Achach; Nuria Diosdado	Duet technical routine	84.8320	10 Q	85.2599	10
Karem Achach; Nuria Diosdado	Duet free routine	86.4333	10 Q	86.5333	10
Karem Achach; Regina Alférez; Teresa Alonso; Nuria Diosdado; Samantha Flores (R); Joana Jiménez; Luisa Rodríguez; Jessica Sobrino; Ana Soto Lara (R); Amaya Velázquez	Team technical routine	85.4788	8 Q	85.9664	8
Karem Achach; Regina Alférez; Teresa Alonso; Nuria Diosdado; Joana Jiménez; Wendy Mayor (R); Luisa Rodríguez; Jessica Sobrino; Ana Soto Lara (R); Amaya Velázquez	Team free routine	87.9000	8 Q	87.9000	8
Karem Achach (R); Regina Alférez; Teresa Alonso; Nuria Diosdado (R); Samantha Flores; Joana Jiménez; Madison López; Wendy Mayor; Luisa Rodríguez; Jessica Sobrino; Ana Soto Lara; Amaya Velázquez	Free routine combination	87.5333	6 Q	88.7333	6

Legend: (R) = Reserve Athlete
