= Swimming at the 2017 World Aquatics Championships – Men's 100 metre breaststroke =

Men's 100 metre breaststroke at the 2017 World Aquatics Championships
- Venue: Danube Arena
- Location: Budapest, Hungary
- Dates: 23 July (heats and semifinals); 24 July (final)
- Competitors: 74 from 66 nations
- Winning time: 57.47

Medalists
gold medal	Adam Peaty	Great Britain
silver medal	Kevin Cordes	United States
bronze medal	Kirill Prigoda	Russia

The Men's 100 metre breaststroke competition at the 2017 World Championships was held on 23 and 24 July 2017.

== Records ==
Prior to the competition, the existing world and championship records were as follows.

World record	Adam Peaty (GBR)	57.13	Rio de Janeiro, Brazil	7 August 2016
Competition record	Adam Peaty (GBR)	58.18	Kazan, Russia	2 August 2015

The following new records were set during this competition.

Date	Event	Name	Nationality	Time	Record
23 July	Semifinal	Adam Peaty	Great Britain	57.75	CR
24 July	Final	Adam Peaty	Great Britain	57.47	CR

== Results ==
=== Heats ===
The heats were held on 23 July at 11:17.

Rank	Heat	Lane	Name	Nationality	Time	Notes
1	8	4	Adam Peaty	Great Britain	58.21	Q
2	8	5	Cody Miller	United States	59.14	Q
3	6	4	Kevin Cordes	United States	59.15	Q
4	8	3	João Gomes Júnior	Brazil	59.24	Q
5	7	3	Nicolò Martinenghi	Italy	59.33	Q, WJ
6	8	7	Kirill Prigoda	Russia	59.36	Q, NR
7	6	3	Ross Murdoch	Great Britain	59.51	Q
8	6	2	Vsevolod Zanko	Russia	59.56	Q
9	6	5	Yan Zibei	China	59.61	Q
10	8	6	Felipe Lima	Brazil	59.62	Q
11	7	5	Yasuhiro Koseki	Japan	59.76	Q
12	7	2	Giedrius Titenis	Lithuania	59.79	Q
13	8	1	Ilya Shymanovich	Belarus	59.84	Q
14	7	1	Richard Funk	Canada	59.89	Q
15	8	8	Andrius Šidlauskas	Lithuania	59.91	Q
16	8	9	Arno Kamminga	Netherlands	59.95	Q
17	8	2	Li Xiang	China	59.97	
18	6	1	Fabio Scozzoli	Italy	1:00.08	
19	7	0	Erik Persson	Sweden	1:00.08	NR
20	6	0	Daniel Cave	Australia	1:00.22	
21	7	6	Dmitriy Balandin	Kazakhstan	1:00.25	
22	7	7	Ippei Watanabe	Japan	1:00.26	
23	8	0	Čaba Silađi	Serbia	1:00.28	
24	5	7	Yannick Käser	Switzerland	1:00.53	NR
25	6	6	Christian vom Lehn	Germany	1:00.60	
26	6	8	Dániel Gyurta	Hungary	1:00.76	
27	7	8	Marcin Stolarski	Poland	1:00.79	
28	7	9	Carlos Claverie	Venezuela	1:00.83	
29	4	1	Tomáš Klobučník	Slovakia	1:00.96	
30	6	7	Jorge Murillo	Colombia	1:01.51	
31	5	4	Nicholas Quinn	Ireland	1:01.56	
32	5	1	Édgar Crespo	Panama	1:01.74	
33	5	8	Youssef El-Kamash	Egypt	1:01.81	
34	5	6	Kim Jae-youn	South Korea	1:01.86	
35	6	9	Laurent Carnol	Luxembourg	1:01.91	
36	5	0	Matti Mattsson	Finland	1:01.92	
37	5	5	Miguel de Lara	Mexico	1:01.93	
38	5	9	Ioannis Karpouzlis	Greece	1:01.95	
39	4	5	Lachezar Shumkov	Bulgaria	1:01.96	
40	4	4	Hüseyin Emre Sakçı	Turkey	1:02.15	
41	4	3	Christopher Rothbauer	Austria	1:02.22	
42	5	3	Azad Al-Barazi	Syria	1:02.26	
43	3	4	Chao Man Hou	Macau	1:02.49	
44	4	2	Renato Prono	Paraguay	1:02.81	
45	4	0	Nikola Obrovac	Croatia	1:02.90	
46	3	5	Jordy Groters	Aruba	1:02.95	
47	5	2	Peter John Stevens	Slovenia	1:03.03	
48	3	6	Denis Petrashov	Kyrgyzstan	1:03.14	
49	4	7	James Deiparine	Philippines	1:03.22	
50	4	9	Daniils Bobrovs	Latvia	1:03.46	
51	3	3	James Lawson	Zimbabwe	1:03.52	
52	3	2	Marc Rojas	Dominican Republic	1:03.65	
53	1	8	Santiago Cavanagh	Bolivia	1:04.58	
54	3	8	Sébastien Kouma	Mali	1:05.03	
55	3	1	Epeli Rabua	Fiji	1:05.12	
56	1	2	Evghenii Paponin	Moldova	1:05.16	
56	3	9	Gregory Penny	U.S. Virgin Islands	1:05.16	
58	2	5	Mario Ervedosa	Angola	1:05.28	NR
59	1	6	Santiago Saint-Upery	Uruguay	1:05.30	
60	3	7	Arnoldo Herrera	Costa Rica	1:05.61	
61	2	7	Amro Al-Wir	Jordan	1:05.70	
62	2	3	Rainier Rafaela	Curaçao	1:06.96	
63	3	0	Roland Toftum	Faroe Islands	1:07.22	
64	2	0	Felipe Gomes	Malawi	1:07.37	
65	2	2	Ashley Seeto	Papua New Guinea	1:07.59	
66	1	4	Muis Ahmad	Brunei	1:08.10	
67	2	6	Corey Ollivierre	Grenada	1:08.17	
68	2	4	Alex Axiotis	Zambia	1:08.50	
69	1	7	Otto Borgards	El Salvador	1:10.62	
70	1	9	Shuvam Shrestha	Nepal	1:11.34	NR
71	1	1	Abdulmalek Ben-Musa	Libya	1:12.00	
72	1	3	Christian Villacrusis	Northern Mariana Islands	1:16.70	
73	1	5	Alassane Lancina	Niger	1:22.54	
	1	0	Alpha Diallo	Guinea	DNS	
	2	1	Dasar Xhambazi	Kosovo	DNS	
	2	8	Jegan Jobe	Gambia	DNS	
	2	9	Adama Ndir	Senegal	DNS	
	4	6	Wassim Elloumi	Tunisia	DNS	
	7	4	Cameron van der Burgh	South Africa	DNS	
	4	8	Lee Hsuan-yen	Chinese Taipei	DSQ	

=== Semifinals ===
The semifinals were held on 23 July at 18:21.

==== Semifinal 1 ====
Rank	Lane	Name	Nationality	Time	Notes
1	4	Cody Miller	United States	59.08	Q
2	3	Kirill Prigoda	Russia	59.24	Q, NR
3	2	Felipe Lima	Brazil	59.48	
4	5	João Gomes Júnior	Brazil	59.56	
5	7	Giedrius Titenis	Lithuania	59.66	
6	8	Arno Kamminga	Netherlands	59.76	
6	6	Vsevolod Zanko	Russia	59.76	
8	1	Richard Funk	Canada	59.92	

==== Semifinal 2 ====
Rank	Lane	Name	Nationality	Time	Notes
1	4	Adam Peaty	Great Britain	57.75	Q, CR
2	5	Kevin Cordes	United States	58.64	Q, AM
3	8	Andrius Šidlauskas	Lithuania	59.12	Q
4	2	Yan Zibei	China	59.15	Q
5	7	Yasuhiro Koseki	Japan	59.18	Q
6	6	Ross Murdoch	Great Britain	59.23	Q
7	3	Nicolò Martinenghi	Italy	59.41	
8	1	Ilya Shymanovich	Belarus	1:00.01	

=== Final ===
The final was held on 24 July at 17:32.

Rank	Lane	Name	Nationality	Time	Notes
1st place, gold medalist(s)	4	Adam Peaty	Great Britain	57.47	CR
2nd place, silver medalist(s)	5	Kevin Cordes	United States	58.79	
3rd place, bronze medalist(s)	8	Kirill Prigoda	Russia	59.05	NR
4	7	Yasuhiro Koseki	Japan	59.10	
5	3	Cody Miller	United States	59.11	
6	6	Andrius Šidlauskas	Lithuania	59.21	
7	2	Yan Zibei	China	59.42	
8	1	Ross Murdoch	Great Britain	59.45	
