= Bohdan Kasian =

Ukrainian swimmer

Personal information
- Born: 14 December 1997 (age 28)

Sport
- Sport: Swimming

Bohdan Kasian (Ukrainian: Богдан Касьян; born 14 December 1997) is a Ukrainian swimmer. He competed in the men's 50 metre backstroke event at the 2017 World Aquatics Championships.
