= Colombia at the 2017 World Aquatics Championships =

- Flag of Colombia
- World Aquatics code: COL
- National federation: Federación Colombiana de Natación
- Website: fecna.com.co

in Budapest, Hungary
- Competitors: 21 in 4 sports
- Medals: Gold 0 Silver 0 Bronze 0 Total 0

World Aquatics Championships appearances
- 1973; 1975; 1978; 1982; 1986; 1991; 1994; 1998; 2001; 2003; 2005; 2007; 2009; 2011; 2013; 2015; 2017; 2019; 2022; 2023; 2024; 2025

Colombia is scheduled to compete at the 2017 World Aquatics Championships in Budapest, Hungary from 14 July to 30 July.

== Diving ==
Colombia has entered 10 divers (seven male and three female).

Men

Athlete	Event	Preliminaries		Semifinals		Final	
Athlete	Event	Points	Rank	Points	Rank	Points	Rank
Alejandro Arias	1 m springboard	302.50	34	—N/a		Did not advance	
Daniel Restrepo	1 m springboard	339.50	20	—N/a		Did not advance	
Sebastián Morales	3 m springboard	383.90	30	Did not advance			
Sebastián Villa	3 m springboard	395.40	21	Did not advance			
Kevin García	10 m platform	313.85	37	Did not advance			
Juan Sebastián Reyes	10 m platform	317.65	36	Did not advance			
Alejandro Arias; Sebastián Morales	3 m synchronized springboard	326.79	18	—N/a		Did not advance	
Kevin García; Víctor Ortega	10 m synchronized platform	333.96	13	—N/a		Did not advance	

Women

Athlete	Event	Preliminaries		Semifinals		Final	
Athlete	Event	Points	Rank	Points	Rank	Points	Rank
Diana Pineda	1 m springboard	232.40	26	—N/a		Did not advance	
Daniela Zapata	1 m springboard	206.15	36	—N/a		Did not advance	
Diana Pineda	3 m springboard	218.55	36	Did not advance			
Carolina Murillo	10 m platform	321.55	7 Q	325.75	6 Q	283.35	12
Carolina Murillo; Daniela Zapata	10 m synchronized platform	242.64	16	—N/a		Did not advance	

Mixed

Athlete	Event	Final	
Athlete	Event	Points	Rank
Diana Pineda; Sebastián Villa	3 m synchronized springboard	277.83	6
Carolina Murillo; Víctor Ortega	10 m synchronized platform	258.93	13
Carolina Murillo; Sebastián Villa	Team	354.90	7

== High diving ==
Colombia qualified two male high divers.

Athlete	Event	Points	Rank
Orlando Duque	Men's high diving	355.10	6
Miguel García	Men's high diving	344.80	7

== Swimming ==
Colombian swimmers have achieved qualifying standards in the following events (up to a maximum of 2 swimmers in each event at the A-standard entry time, and 1 at the B-standard):

Men

Athlete	Event	Heat		Semifinal		Final	
Athlete	Event	Time	Rank	Time	Rank	Time	Rank
David Arias	100 m butterfly	54.48	49	Did not advance			
Jonathan Gómez	200 m butterfly	1:56.60 NR	14 Q	1:57.60	15	Did not advance	
Jonathan Gómez	400 m individual medley	DNS		—N/a		Did not advance	
Marco González	50 m freestyle	23.59	68	Did not advance			
Jorge Murillo	50 m breaststroke	27.67	22	Did not advance			
Jorge Murillo	100 m breaststroke	1:01.51	30	Did not advance			
Jorge Murillo	200 m breaststroke	2:19.05	34	Did not advance			
Omar Pinzón	50 m backstroke	DNS		Did not advance			
Omar Pinzón	200 m backstroke	2:00.68	28	Did not advance			

Women

Athlete	Event	Heat		Semifinal		Final	
Athlete	Event	Time	Rank	Time	Rank	Time	Rank
Isabella Arcila	50 m freestyle	25.70	33	Did not advance			
Isabella Arcila	50 m backstroke	28.59	27	Did not advance			
Isabella Arcila	100 m backstroke	1:02.24	=32	Did not advance			
Jessica Camposano	200 m freestyle	2:04.13	33	Did not advance			

== Synchronized swimming ==
Colombia's synchronized swimming team consisted of 2 athletes (2 female).

Women

Athlete	Event	Preliminaries		Final	
Athlete	Event	Points	Rank	Points	Rank
Estefanía Álvarez; Mónica Arango	Duet technical routine	77.8780	18	Did not advance	
Estefanía Álvarez; Mónica Arango	Duet free routine	79.8000	21	Did not advance	
