= Jade Dusablon =

Canadian swimmer (born 1994)

Personal information
- Nationality: Canada
- Born: January 15, 1994 (age 32) Quebec City, Quebec, Canada
- Height: 5 ft 6 in (168 cm)
- Weight: 133 lb (60 kg)

Sport
- Sport: Swimming
- Strokes: Freestyle

Jade Dusablon (born January 15, 1994) is a Canadian long-distance swimmer from Quebec City, Quebec. Dusablon won a gold medal in the women's open water 5 km swim at the Fran Crippen Cup. She finished 4th at the 2014 Pan Pacific Swimming Championships. She won a silver medal in the 10 km event at the 2011 FINA World Cup in Lac Mégantic and added a 10 km silver in 2013 at the World Cup in Lac St-Jean.

In April 2017, Dusablon was named to Canada's 2017 World Aquatics Championships team in Budapest, Hungary.
