= Si Yajie =

Chinese diver (born 1998)

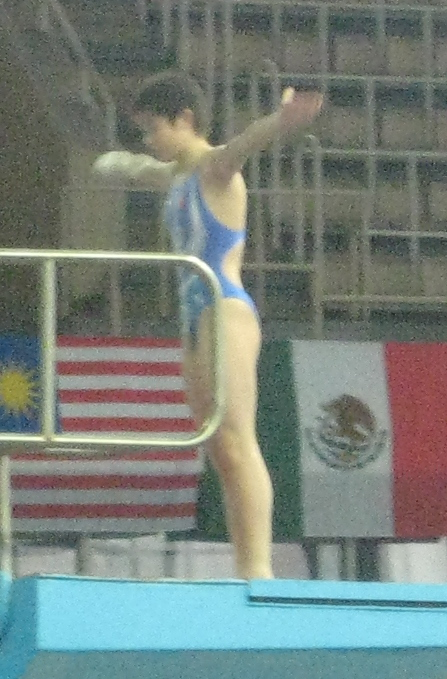
- Si in 2013

Personal information
- Native name: 司雅杰
- Nationality: Chinese
- Born: 4 December 1998 (age 27) Xi'an, China
- Height: 1.64 m (5 ft 5 in)
- Weight: 57 kg (126 lb)

Sport
- Country: China
- Sport: Diving
- Event: 10 m
- Club: Shaanxi Province
Medal record
Olympic Games
| Silver medal – second place | 2016 Rio de Janeiro | 10 m platform |
World Championships
| Gold medal – first place | 2013 Barcelona | 10 m platform |
| Gold medal – first place | 2015 Kazan | 10 m mixed synchro |
| Gold medal – first place | 2017 Budapest | 10 m synchro |
| Gold medal – first place | 2019 Gwangju | 10 m mixed synchro |
| Gold medal – first place | 2023 Fukuoka | Team |
| Silver medal – second place | 2017 Budapest | 10 m platform |

Si Yajie (Chinese: 司雅杰; born 4 December 1998) is a Chinese female diver. As a 14-year-old, she won the gold medal in the women's 10 m platform at the 2013 World Aquatics Championships.
