= Park Han-byeol (swimmer) =

South Korean swimmer

Personal information
- Born: 28 September 1997 (age 28)

Sport
- Sport: Swimming

Park Han-byeol (born 28 September 1997) is a South Korean swimmer. She competed in the women's 50 metre backstroke event at the 2017 World Aquatics Championships.
