= Yu Hyoun-ji =

South Korean swimmer

Personal information
- Nationality: South Korean
- Born: 12 October 1994 (age 31)

Sport
- Sport: Swimming
Medal record
Representing South Korea
Summer Universiade
Silver medal – second place	2015 Gwangju	50m backstroke

Yu Hyoun-ji (born 12 October 1994) is a South Korean swimmer. She competed in the women's 50 metre backstroke event at the 2017 World Aquatics Championships.
