= Dmytro Gurnytskyi =

Ukrainian swimmer

Personal information
- Born: 24 October 1994 (age 31)

Sport
- Sport: Swimming

Dmytro Gurnytskyi (Ukrainian: Дмитро Анатолійович Гурницький; born 24 October 1994) is a Ukrainian swimmer. He competed in the men's 50 metre backstroke event at the 2017 World Aquatics Championships.
