= Diving at the 2017 World Aquatics Championships =

Diving at the 2017 World Aquatics Championships was held between 14 and 22 July 2017 in Budapest, Hungary.

== Events ==
The following events were contested:

- 1 m springboard
- 3 m springboard
- 10 m platform
- 3 m springboard synchronized
- 10 m platform synchronized
- 3 m mixed springboard synchronized
- 10 m mixed platform synchronized
- Team event

Individual events consisted of preliminaries, semifinals and finals. The order of divers in the preliminary round was determined by computerized random selection, during the technical meeting. The 18 divers with the highest scores in the preliminaries proceed to the semifinals.

The semifinal consisted of the top 18 ranked divers from the preliminary competition and the final consisted of the top 12 ranked divers from the semifinal.

== Schedule ==
13 events were held.

All time are local (UTC+2).

Date	Time	Event
14 July 2017	11:00	Men's 1 metre springboard preliminaries
14 July 2017	16:00	Women's 1 metre springboard preliminaries
15 July 2017	10:00	Men's Synchronized 3 metre springboard preliminaries
15 July 2017	13:00	Mixed 10 metre platform final
15 July 2017	16:00	Women's 1 metre springboard final
15 July 2017	18:30	Men's Synchronized 3 metre springboard final
16 July 2017	10:00	Women's Synchronized 10 metre platform preliminaries
16 July 2017	15:30	Men's 1 metre springboard final
16 July 2017	18:30	Women's Synchronized 10 metre platform final
17 July 2017	10:00	Women's Synchronized 3 metre springboard preliminaries
17 July 2017	13:00	Men's Synchronized 10 metre platform preliminaries
17 July 2017	16:00	Women's Synchronized 3 metre springboard final
17 July 2017	18:30	Men's Synchronized 10 metre platform final
18 July 2017	10:00	Women's 10 metre platform preliminaries
18 July 2017	15:30	Women's 10 metre platform semifinal
18 July 2017	18:30	Team event
19 July 2017	10:00	Men's 3 metre springboard preliminaries
19 July 2017	15:30	Men's 3 metre springboard semifinal
19 July 2017	18:30	Women's 10 metre platform final
20 July 2017	10:00	Women's 3 metre springboard preliminaries
20 July 2017	15:30	Women's 3 metre springboard semifinal
20 July 2017	18:30	Men's 3 metre springboard final
21 July 2017	10:00	Men's 10 metre platform preliminaries
21 July 2017	15:30	Men's 10 metre platform semifinal
21 July 2017	18:30	Women's 3 metre springboard final
22 July 2017	14:00	Mixed 3 metre springboard final
22 July 2017	17:00	Men's 10 metre platform final

== Medal summary ==
=== Medal table ===
Rank	Nation	Gold	Silver	Bronze	Total
1	China	8	5	2	15
2	Russia	1	2	2	5
3	Great Britain	1	2	0	3
4	Malaysia	1	0	1	2
5	Australia	1	0	0	1
5	France	1	0	0	1
7	Canada	0	1	2	3
8	Germany	0	1	1	2
8	North Korea	0	1	1	2
10	Mexico	0	1	0	1
11	Italy	0	0	2	2
12	Ukraine	0	0	1	1
12	United States	0	0	1	1
Totals (13 entries)		13	13	13	39

=== Men ===
Event	Gold		Silver		Bronze	
1 metre springboard	Peng Jianfeng; China	448.40	He Chao; China	447.20	Giovanni Tocci; Italy	444.25
3 metre springboard	Xie Siyi; China	547.10	Patrick Hausding; Germany	526.15	Ilya Zakharov; Russia	505.90
10 metre platform	Tom Daley; Great Britain	590.95	Chen Aisen; China	585.25	Yang Jian; China	565.15
Synchronized; 3 metre springboard	Russia (RUS); Evgeny Kuznetsov; Ilya Zakharov	450.30	China (CHN); Cao Yuan; Xie Siyi	443.40	Ukraine (UKR); Oleh Kolodiy; Illya Kvasha	429.99
Synchronized; 10 metre platform	China (CHN); Chen Aisen; Yang Hao	498.48	Russia (RUS); Aleksandr Bondar; Viktor Minibaev	458.85	Germany (GER); Patrick Hausding; Sascha Klein	440.82

=== Women ===
Event	Gold		Silver		Bronze	
1 metre springboard	Maddison Keeney; Australia	314.95	Nadezhda Bazhina; Russia	304.70	Elena Bertocchi; Italy	296.40
3 metre springboard	Shi Tingmao; China	383.50	Wang Han; China	359.40	Jennifer Abel; Canada	351.55
10 metre platform	Cheong Jun Hoong; Malaysia	397.50	Si Yajie; China	396.00	Ren Qian; China	391.95
Synchronized; 3 metre springboard	China (CHN); Chang Yani; Shi Tingmao	333.30	Canada (CAN); Jennifer Abel; Mélissa Citrini-Beaulieu	323.43	Russia (RUS); Nadezhda Bazhina; Kristina Ilinykh	312.60
Synchronized; 10 metre platform	China (CHN); Ren Qian; Si Yajie	352.56	North Korea (PRK); Kim Mi-rae; Kim Kuk-hyang	336.48	Malaysia (MAS); Cheong Jun Hoong; Pandelela Rinong	328.74

=== Mixed ===
Event	Gold		Silver		Bronze	
3 metre springboard	China (CHN); Wang Han; Li Zheng	323.70	Great Britain (GBR); Grace Reid; Tom Daley	308.04	Canada (CAN); Jennifer Abel; François Imbeau-Dulac	297.72
10 metre platform	China (CHN); Ren Qian; Lian Junjie	352.98	Great Britain (GBR); Lois Toulson; Matty Lee	323.28	North Korea (PRK); Kim Mi-rae; Hyon Il-myong	318.12
Team	France (FRA); Laura Marino; Matthieu Rosset	406.40	Mexico (MEX); Viviana del Ángel; Rommel Pacheco	402.35	United States (USA); Krysta Palmer; David Dinsmore	395.90

== Participating nations ==
A total of 245 divers from 43 nations have been entered. The number of divers a nation entered is in parentheses beside the name of the country.

- Armenia (3)
- Australia (10)
- Austria (1)
- Belarus (5)
- Brazil (6)
- Canada (11)
- Chile (2)
- China (17)
- Colombia (10)
- Croatia (2)
- Cuba (6)
- Dominican Republic (1)
- Egypt (6)
- Finland (3)
- France (4)
- Georgia (2)
- Germany (12)
- Great Britain (12)
- Hungary (5)
- Ireland (1)
- Italy (11)
- Jamaica (1)
- Japan (5)
- Lithuania (2)
- Macau (4)
- Malaysia (8)
- Mexico (16)
- Netherlands (4)
- New Zealand (4)
- North Korea (5)
- Puerto Rico (1)
- Poland (3)
- Romania (2)
- Russia (12)
- South Africa (4)
- Serbia (1)
- Singapore (4)
- South Korea (6)
- Spain (3)
- Switzerland (6)
- Ukraine (12)
- United States (16)
- Uzbekistan (3)
- Venezuela (4)
