= Mélissa Citrini-Beaulieu =

Canadian diver (born 1995)

Personal information
- Born: June 12, 1995 (age 31) Saint-Constant, Quebec, Canada
- Height: 1.65 m (5 ft 5 in)

Sport
- Country: Canada
- Sport: Diving
- Event(s): 3 m, 3 m synchro
- Club: CAMO
- Partner: Jennifer Abel
- Coached by: César Henderson
Medal record
Olympic Games
Silver medal – second place	2020 Tokyo	3 m synchro
World Championships
Silver medal – second place	2017 Budapest	3 m synchro
Silver medal – second place	2019 Gwangju	3 m synchro

Mélissa Citrini-Beaulieu (born June 12, 1995) is a Canadian diver. She is currently partnered with Jennifer Abel for synchronized diving. She won a silver medal, together with Abel at the 2017 World Aquatics Championships in Budapest while competing in the 3 m synchro springboard event and a silver medal at the 2020 Summer Olympics in the same event.
