= Ri Hyon-ju =

North Korean diver

- Hangul: 리현주
- RR: Ri Hyeonju
- MR: Ri Hyŏnju

Ri Hyon-ju
Personal information
- Nationality: North Korean
- Born: 20 February 1996 (age 30) Pyongyang, North Korea

Sport
- Sport: Diving
- Event: 10 metre platform
Medal record
Men's diving
Representing North Korea
Summer Universiade
Gold medal – first place	2017 Taipei	10 m platform
Silver medal – second place	2017 Taipei	10 m synchro

Ri Hyon-ju (born 20 February 1996 in Pyongyang) is a North Korean diver. He competed in the 10 metre platform at the 2012 Summer Olympics.
