= Kim Kuk-hyang (diver) =

North Korean diver (born 1999)

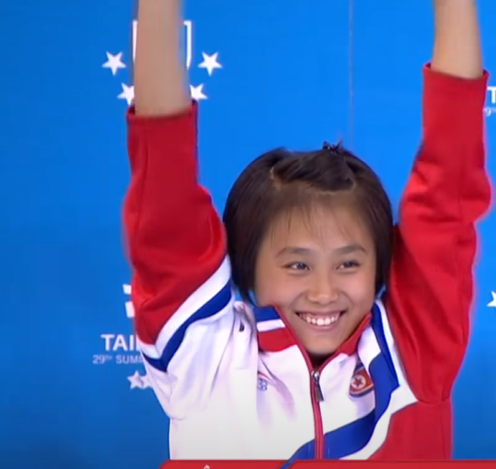
- Kim in 2017

Personal information
- Born: 4 April 1999 (age 27)
- Height: 1.54 m (5 ft 1 in)
- Weight: 36 kg (79 lb)

Sport
- Country: North Korea
- Events: Diving 10 m, 10 m synchro
Medal record
World Championships
Gold medal – first place	2015 Kazan	10m platform
Silver medal – second place	2017 Budapest	10 m platform synchro
Summer Universiade
Gold medal – first place	2017 Taipei	Team
Gold medal – first place	2017 Taipei	10m platform
Gold medal – first place	2017 Taipei	10m synchro
Gold medal – first place	2017 Taipei	Mixed 10m synchro
Asian Games
Silver medal – second place	2018 Jakarta	10m synchro platform

Korean name
- Hangul: 김국향
- Hanja: 金國香
- RR: Gim Gukhyang
- MR: Kim Kukhyang

Kim Kuk-hyang (Korean pronunciation: [kim.ɡu.kʰjaŋ] or [kim] [ku.kʰjaŋ]; born 4 April 1999) is a North Korean diver. Her main event is 10m platform. At the 2015 World Aquatics Championships, she became the first world champion in Team North Korea after winning the gold medal of women's 10m platform.
