= Swimming at the 2015 World Aquatics Championships – Women's 50 metre butterfly =

Women's 50 metre butterfly at the 2015 World Aquatics Championships
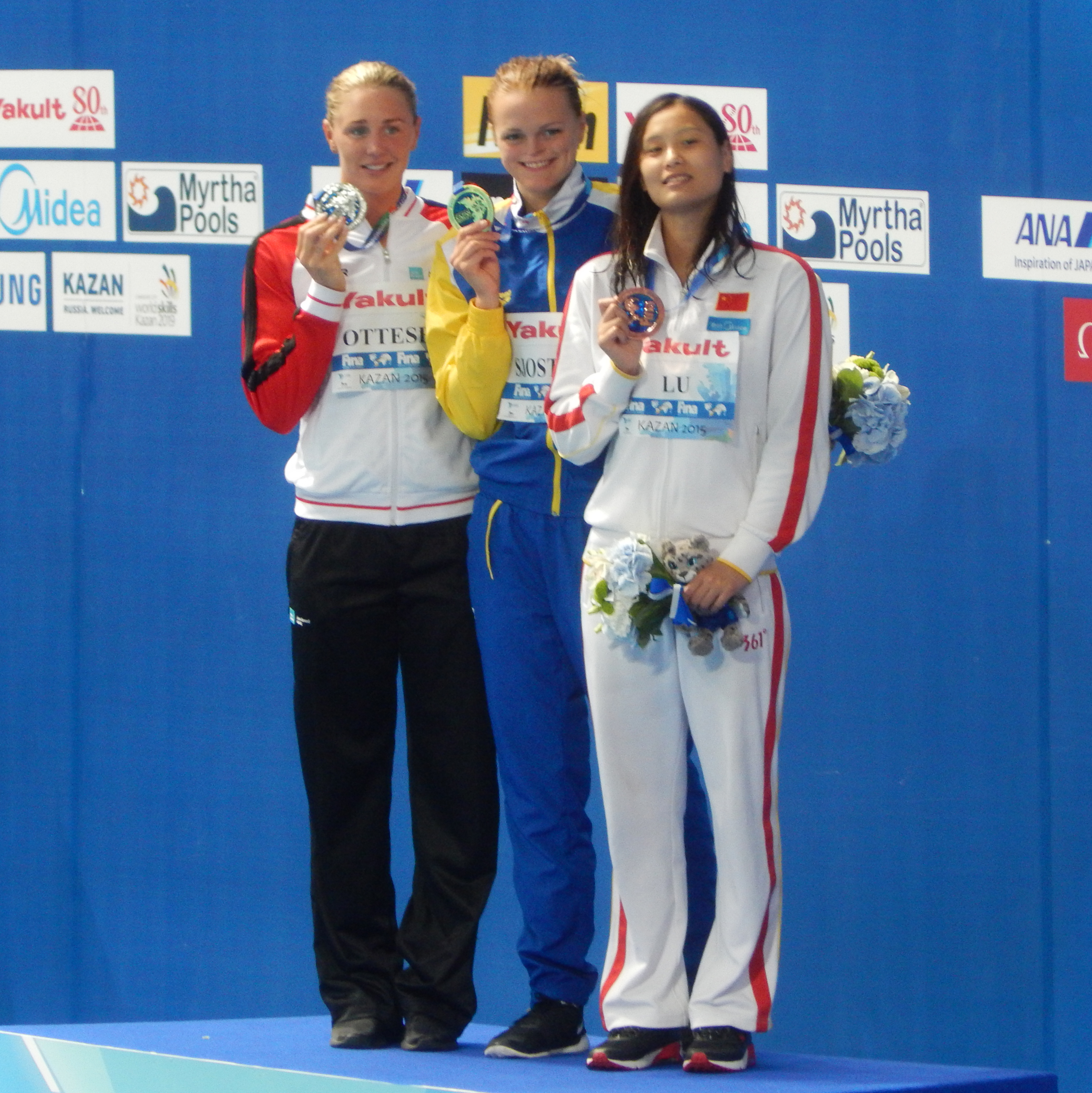
- Victory Ceremony
- Dates: 7 August (heats and semifinals); 8 August (final)
- Competitors: 64 from 56 nations
- Winning time: 24.96

Medalists
gold medal	Sarah Sjöström	Sweden
silver medal	Jeanette Ottesen	Denmark
bronze medal	Lu Ying	China

The Women's 50 metre butterfly competition of the swimming events at the 2015 World Aquatics Championships was held on 7 August with the heats and the semifinals and 8 August with the final.

== Records ==
Prior to the competition, the existing world and championship records were as follows.

World record	Sarah Sjöström (SWE)	24.43	Borås, Sweden	5 July 2014
Competition record	Therese Alshammar (SWE)	25.07	Rome, Italy	31 July 2009

The following new records were set during this competition.

Date	Event	Name	Nationality	Time	Record
7 August	Semifinal 2	Sarah Sjöström	Sweden	25.06	CR
8 August	Final	Sarah Sjöström	Sweden	24.96	CR

== Results ==
=== Heats ===
The heats were held at 09:54

Rank	Heat	Lane	Name	Nationality	Time	Notes
1	7	4	Sarah Sjöström	Sweden	25.43	Q
2	5	4	Jeanette Ottesen	Denmark	25.51	Q
3	7	5	Inge Dekker	Netherlands	25.66	Q
4	5	5	Lu Ying	China	25.69	Q
5	6	4	Fran Halsall	Great Britain	25.86	Q
6	6	3	Arianna Vanderpool-Wallace	Bahamas	26.02	Q
7	6	6	Elena Gemo	Italy	26.07	Q
7	7	6	Kendyl Stewart	United States	26.07	Q
9	6	7	Anna Dowgiert	Poland	26.24	Q, NR
10	5	2	Kimberly Buys	Belgium	26.28	Q
11	6	5	Silvia Di Pietro	Italy	26.32	Q
12	7	2	Farida Osman	Egypt	26.33	Q
12	7	7	Mélanie Henique	France	26.33	Q
14	7	3	Béryl Gastaldello	France	26.46	Q
14	7	1	Noemie Thomas	Canada	26.46	Q
16	5	8	Daynara de Paula	Brazil	26.49	Q
17	6	2	Claire Donahue	United States	26.52	
18	7	8	Nastja Govejšek	Slovenia	26.54	
19	6	1	Rikako Ikee	Japan	26.66	
20	6	8	Misaki Yamaguchi	Japan	26.68	
21	4	7	Bryndis Hansen	Iceland	26.79	NR
21	5	3	Emma McKeon	Australia	26.79	
23	5	0	Aleksandra Urbańczyk	Poland	26.82	
24	4	3	Katarína Listopadová	Slovakia	26.84	
25	6	9	Anna Ntountounaki	Greece	26.85	
26	4	0	An Se-hyeon	South Korea	26.90	
26	5	7	Amit Ivry	Israel	26.90	
26	7	0	Brianna Throssell	Australia	26.90	
29	5	1	Katerine Savard	Canada	26.93	
30	4	8	Sviatlana Khakhlova	Belarus	26.99	
31	4	4	Alia Atkinson	Jamaica	27.01	
31	5	9	Lucie Svěcená	Czech Republic	27.01	
33	4	2	Sasha Touretski	Switzerland	27.04	NR
34	5	6	Nataliya Lovtsova	Russia	27.11	
35	4	5	Sze Hang Yu	Hong Kong	27.24	
36	4	1	Fanny Teijonsalo	Finland	27.49	
37	3	5	Carolina Colorado Henao	Colombia	27.58	
37	4	9	Quah Ting Wen	Singapore	27.58	
39	3	4	Jeserik Pinto	Venezuela	27.70	
40	3	3	Jasmine Al-Khaldi	Philippines	28.16	
41	3	6	Sotiria Neofytou	Cyprus	28.25	
42	3	2	Amina Kajtaz	Bosnia and Herzegovina	28.32	
43	7	9	Laura Arroyo	Mexico	28.98	
44	3	1	Astri Foldarskar	Faroe Islands	29.00	
45	6	0	Sharo Rodríguez	Mexico	29.13	
46	2	3	San Su Moe Theint	Myanmar	29.21	
47	3	9	María Ribera	Bolivia	29.22	
48	3	7	Elinah Phillip	British Virgin Islands	29.29	
49	2	4	Dalia Torrez Zamora	Nicaragua	29.31	
50	3	8	Choe Su-rim	North Korea	29.57	
51	3	0	Jannah Sonnenschein	Mozambique	29.66	
52	2	7	Ann-Marie Hepler	Marshall Islands	30.02	
53	2	6	Samantha Roberts	Antigua and Barbuda	30.16	
54	2	5	Chade Nersicio	Curaçao	30.23	
55	2	1	Tegan McCarthy	Papua New Guinea	30.27	
56	2	9	Jamila Sanmoogan	Guyana	31.38	
57	2	0	Dirngulbai Misech	Palau	31.70	
58	2	8	Irene Prescott	Tonga	31.90	
59	1	4	Rita Zeqiri	Kosovo	32.12	
60	1	3	Sonia Aktar	Bangladesh	32.81	
61	1	6	Angel de Jesús	Northern Mariana Islands	33.86	
62	1	5	Rahel Gebresilassie	Ethiopia	36.15	
63	2	2	Fatoumata Samassékou	Mali	36.31	
64	1	2	Alzain Tareq	Bahrain	41.13	
	4	6	Liliána Szilágyi	Hungary		DNS

=== Semifinals ===
The semifinals were held at 18:45.

==== Semifinal 1 ====
Rank	Lane	Name	Nationality	Time	Notes
1	4	Jeanette Ottesen	Denmark	25.27	Q
2	5	Lu Ying	China	25.79	Q
3	3	Arianna Vanderpool-Wallace	Bahamas	25.81	Q
4	7	Farida Osman	Egypt	25.88	Q, AF
5	6	Kendyl Stewart	United States	25.93	
6	8	Daynara de Paula	Brazil	26.24	
7	1	Béryl Gastaldello	France	26.25	
8	2	Kimberly Buys	Belgium	26.43	

==== Semifinal 2 ====
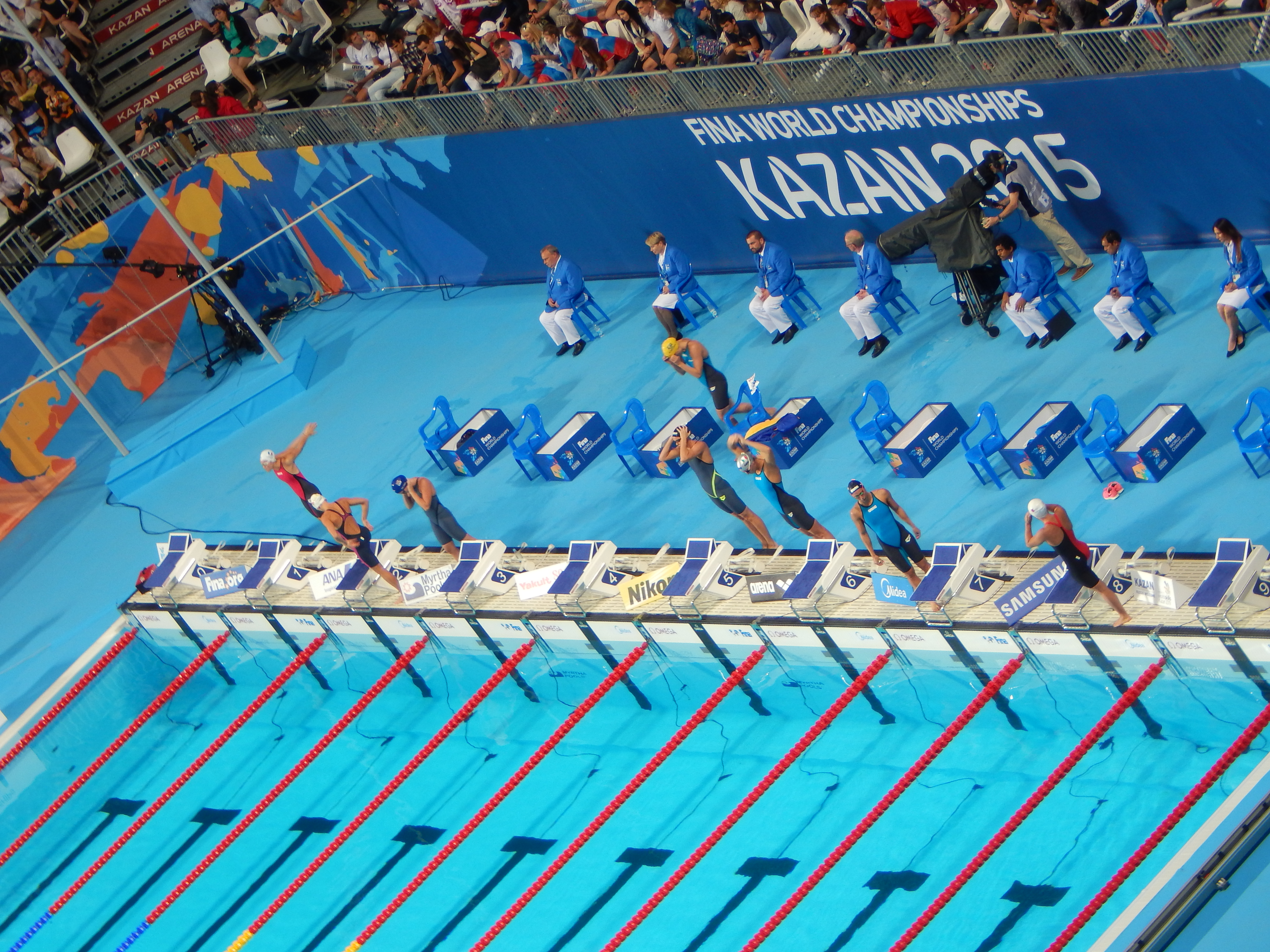
Second Semi

Rank	Lane	Name	Nationality	Time	Notes
1	4	Sarah Sjöström	Sweden	25.06	Q, CR
2	3	Fran Halsall	Great Britain	25.71	Q
3	5	Inge Dekker	Netherlands	25.90	Q
4	2	Anna Dowgiert	Poland	25.91	Q, NR
5	1	Mélanie Henique	France	26.03	
6	6	Elena Gemo	Italy	26.11	
7	7	Silvia Di Pietro	Italy	26.17	
8	8	Noemie Thomas	Canada	26.37	

=== Final ===
The final was held on 8 August at 17:32.

Rank	Lane	Name	Nationality	Time	Notes
1st place, gold medalist(s)	4	Sarah Sjöström	Sweden	24.96	CR
2nd place, silver medalist(s)	5	Jeanette Ottesen	Denmark	25.34	
3rd place, bronze medalist(s)	6	Lu Ying	China	25.37	AS
4	1	Inge Dekker	Netherlands	25.64	
5	7	Farida Osman	Egypt	25.78	AF
6	3	Fran Halsall	Great Britain	25.85	
7	2	Arianna Vanderpool-Wallace	Bahamas	25.93	
8	8	Anna Dowgiert	Poland	26.20	
