= Hungary at the 2015 World Aquatics Championships =

- Flag of Hungary
- World Aquatics code: HUN
- National federation: Magyar Úszó Szövetség
- Website: www.musz.hu

in Kazan, Russia
- Competitors: 53 in 4 sports
- Medals Ranked 8th: Gold 3 Silver 3 Bronze 4 Total 10

World Aquatics Championships appearances (overview)
- 1973; 1975; 1978; 1982; 1986; 1991; 1994; 1998; 2001; 2003; 2005; 2007; 2009; 2011; 2013; 2015; 2017; 2019; 2022; 2023; 2024; 2025

Hungary competed at the 2015 World Aquatics Championships in Kazan, Russia between 24 July to 9 August 2015.

== Medalists ==
Medal	Name	Sport	Event	Date
Gold	Katinka Hosszú	Swimming	Women's 200 m individual medley	August 3
Gold	László Cseh	Swimming	Men's 200 m butterfly	August 5
Gold	Katinka Hosszú	Swimming	Women's 400 m individual medley	August 9
Silver	Anna Olasz	Open water swimming	Women's 25 km	August 1
Silver	László Cseh	Swimming	Men's 100 m butterfly	August 8
Silver	Dávid Verrasztó	Swimming	Men's 400 m individual medley	August 9
Bronze	László Cseh	Swimming	Men's 50 m butterfly	August 3
Bronze	Boglárka Kapás	Swimming	Women's 1500 m freestyle	August 4
Bronze	Dániel Gyurta	Swimming	Men's 200 m breaststroke	August 7
Bronze	Katinka Hosszú	Swimming	Women's 200 m backstroke	August 7

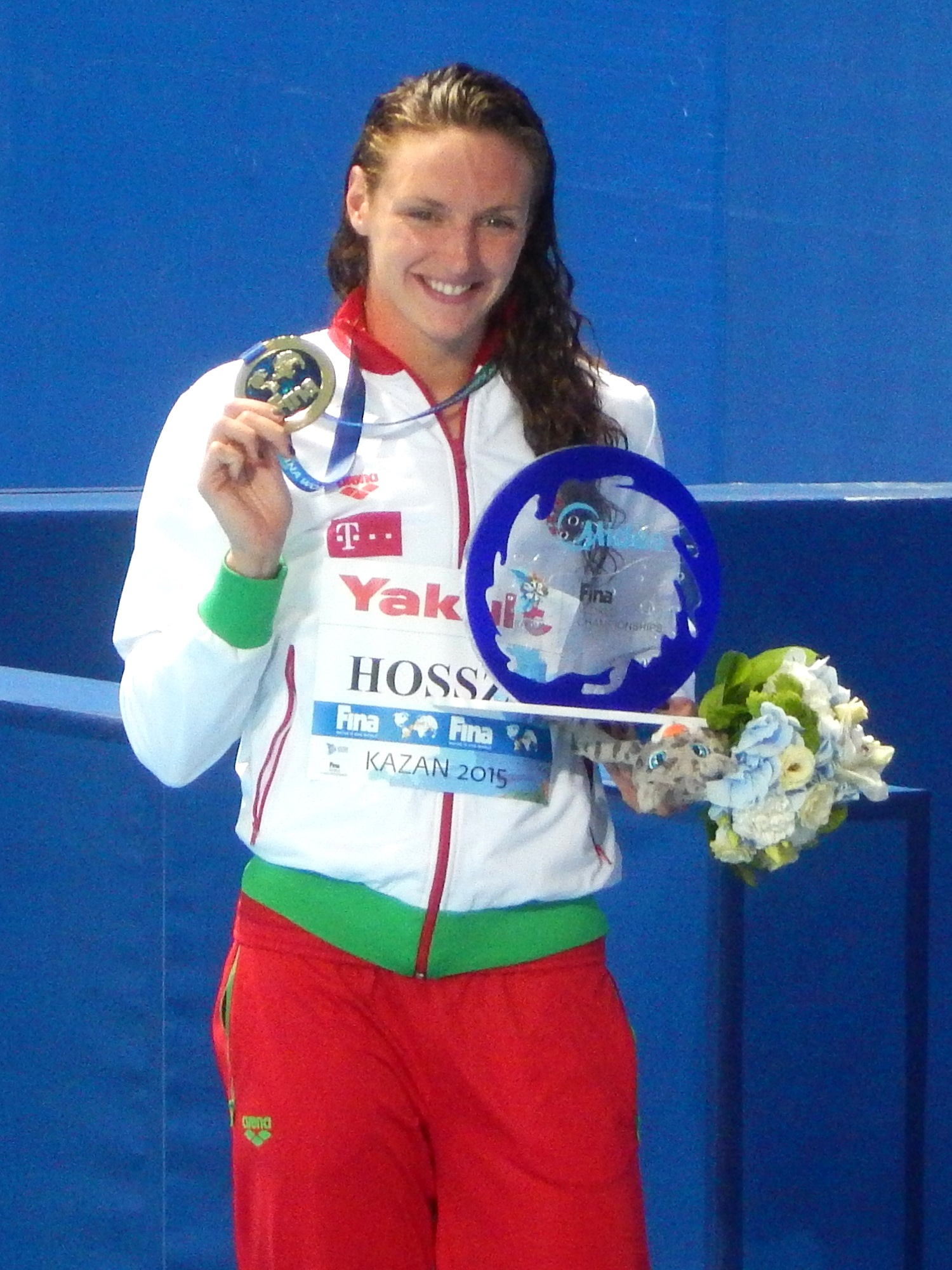
Katinka Hosszú
Gold
200 m individual medley

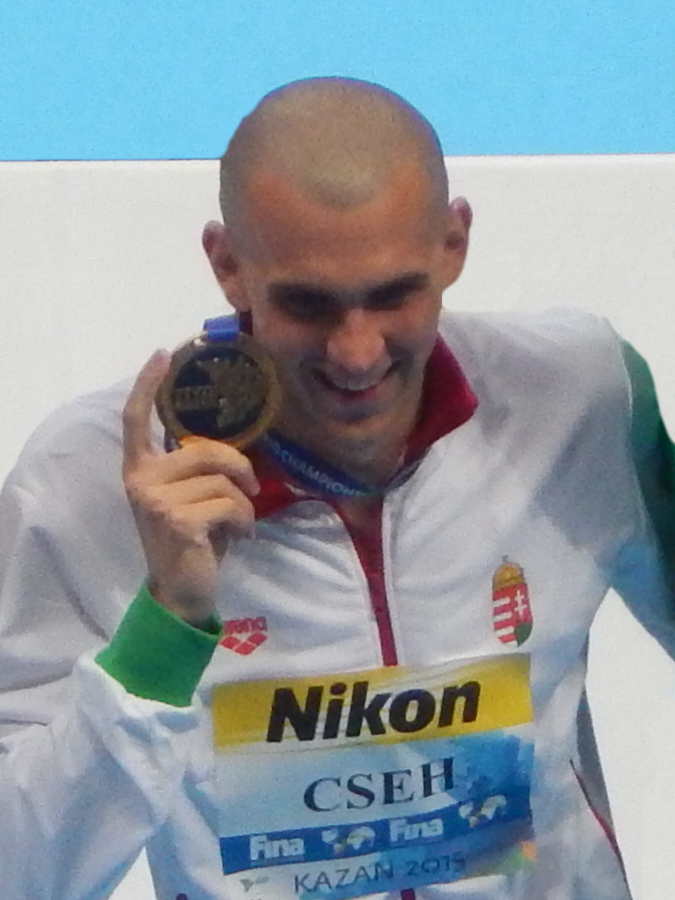
László Cseh
Gold
200 m butterfly

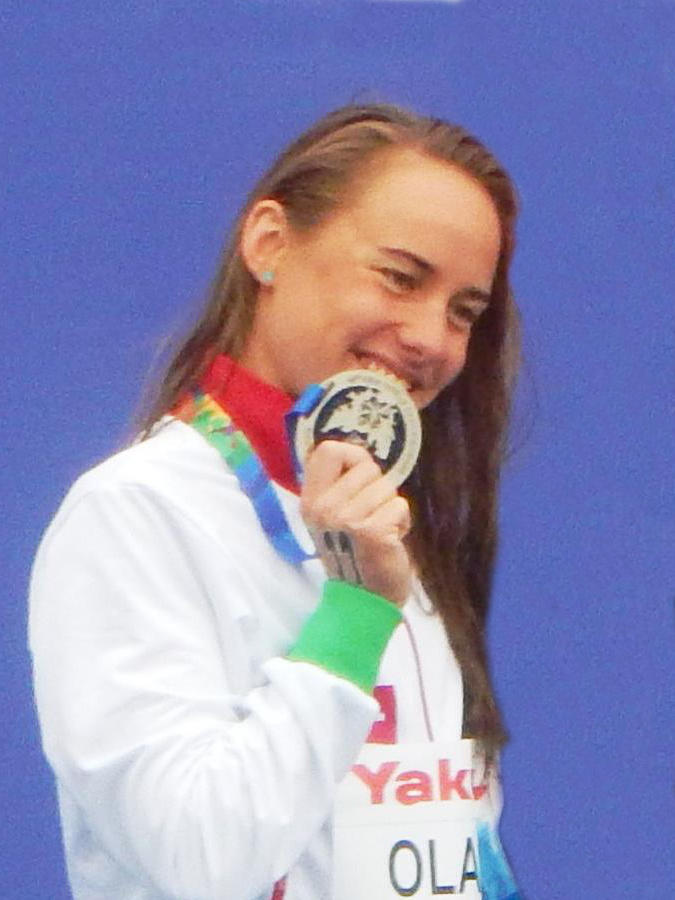
Anna Olasz
Silver
25 km

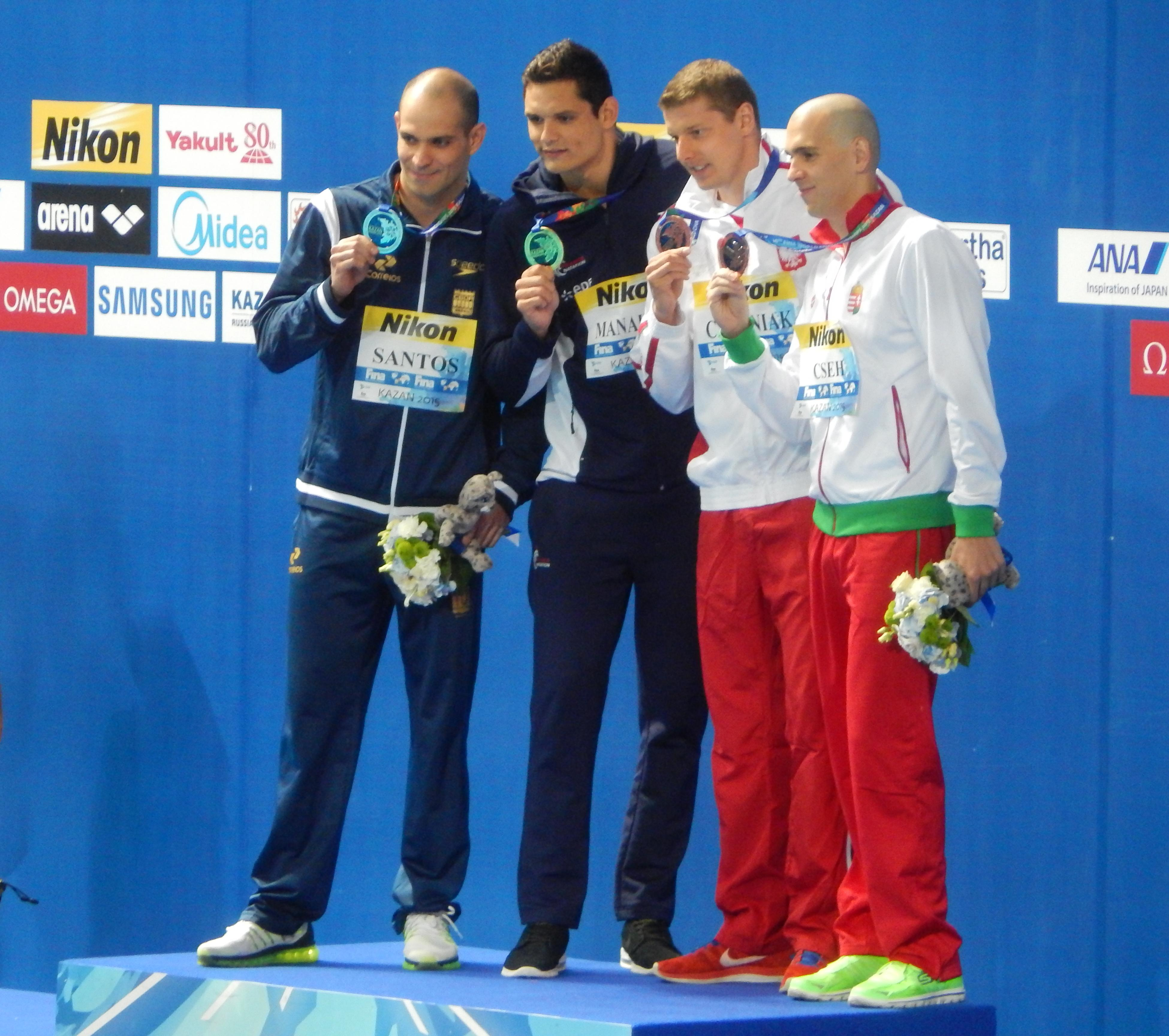
László Cseh
Bronze
50 m butterfly

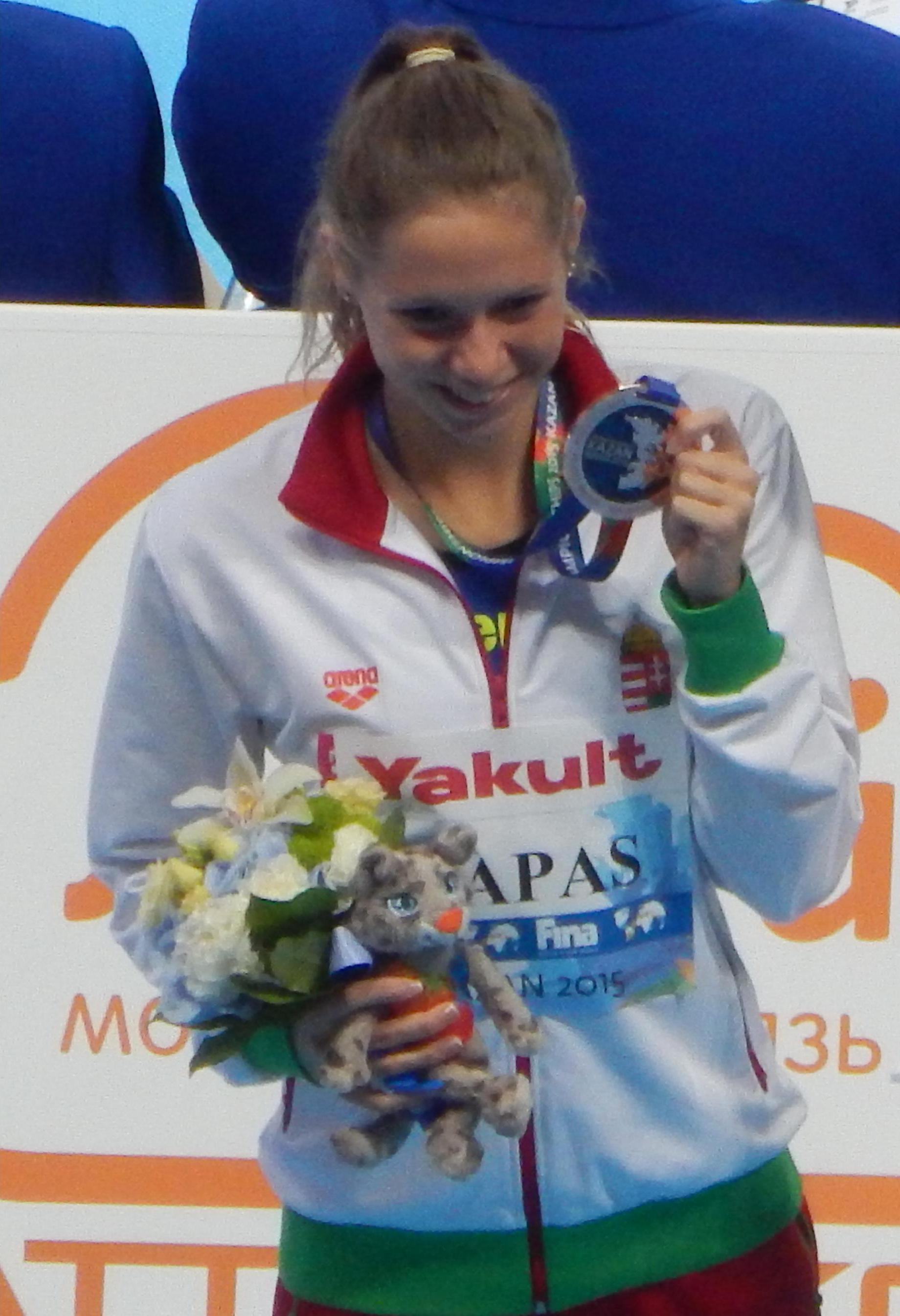
Boglárka Kapás
Bronze
1500 m freestyle

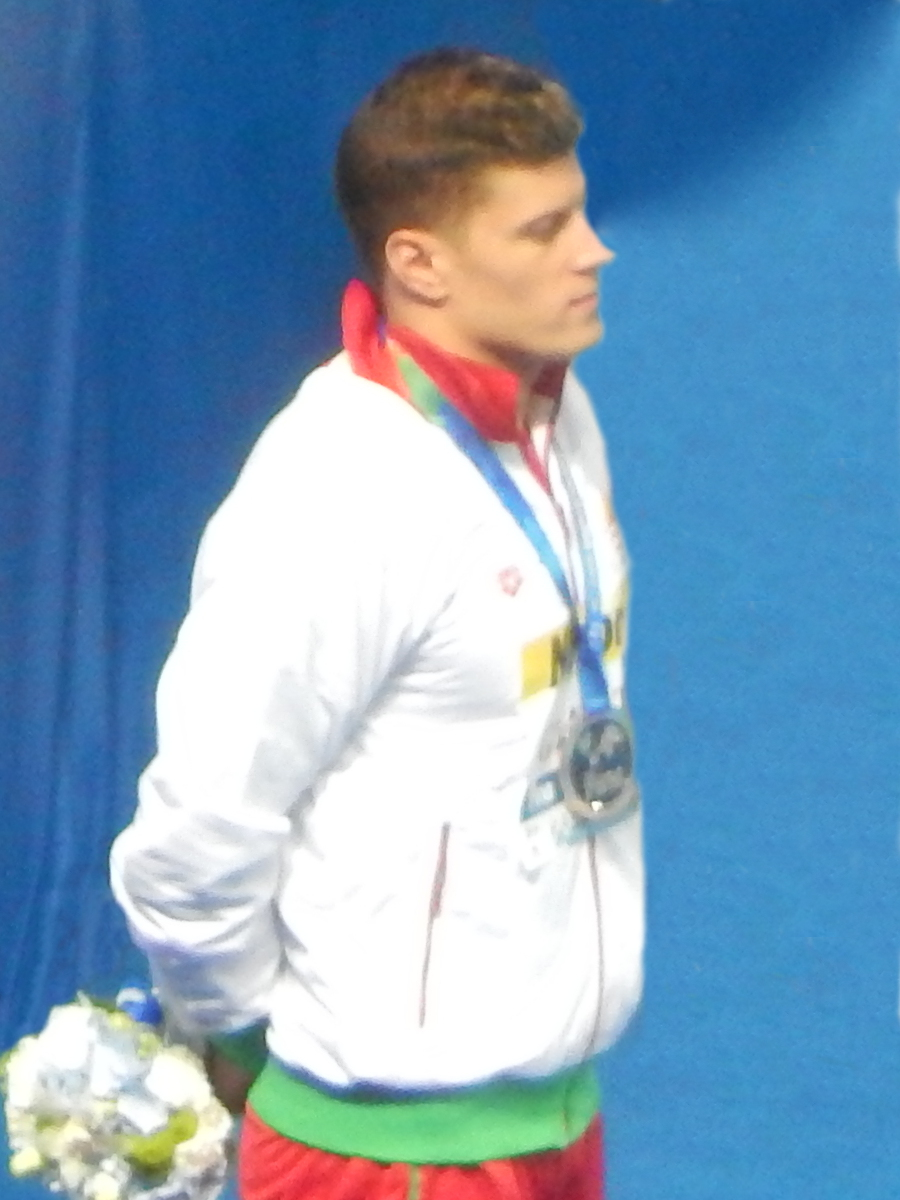
Dániel Gyurta
Bronze
200 m breaststroke

== Diving ==
Hungarian divers qualified for the individual spots and the synchronized teams at the World Championships.

Men

Athlete	Event	Preliminaries		Semifinals		Final	
Athlete	Event	Points	Rank	Points	Rank	Points	Rank
Botond Bóta	3 m springboard	282.05	54	Did not advance			

Women

Athlete	Event	Preliminaries		Semifinals		Final	
Athlete	Event	Points	Rank	Points	Rank	Points	Rank
Flóra Gondos	3 m springboard	253.10	29	Did not advance			
Villő Kormos	10 m platform	269.80	30	Did not advance			
Zsófia Reisinger	10 m platform	228.90	36	Did not advance			
Flóra Gondos; Villő Kormos	3 m synchronized springboard	229.92	17	—N/a		Did not advance	
Villő Kormos; Zsófia Reisinger	10 m synchronized platform	261.30	13	—N/a		Did not advance	

== Open water swimming ==
Hungary has fielded a team of six swimmers in the open water marathon.

Men

Athlete	Event	Time	Rank
Gergely Gyurta	10 km	1:50:37.6	13
Márk Papp	5 km	55:25.3	13
Márk Papp	10 km	1:52:53.0	36
Dániel Székelyi	5 km	55:28.9	19
Dániel Székelyi	25 km	5:15:03.4	20

Women

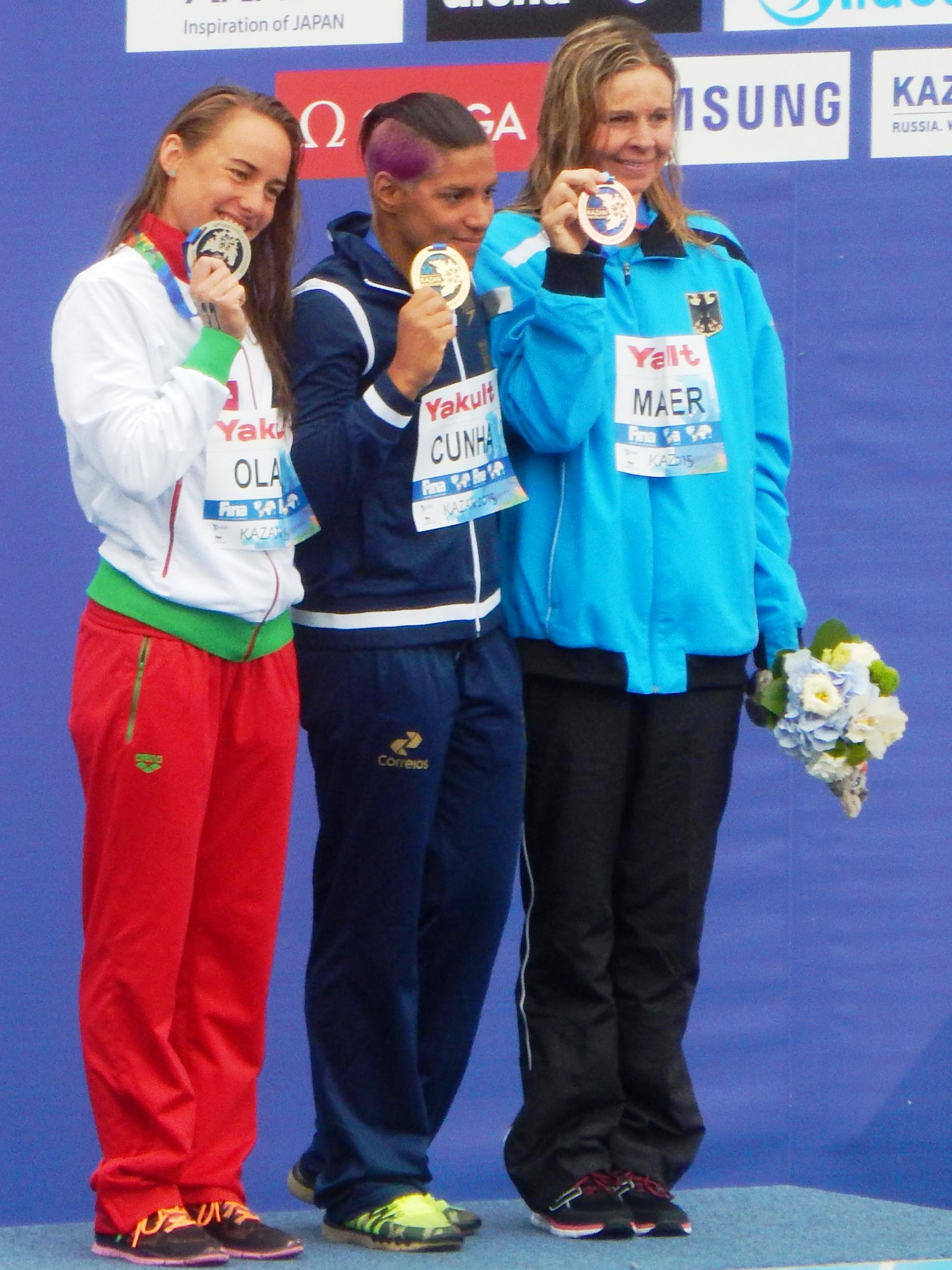
Victory Ceremony - 25 km

Athlete	Event	Time	Rank
Nikoletta Kiss	25 km	5:30:36.4	14
Anna Olasz	5 km	59:16.5	13
Anna Olasz	10 km	1:58:40.0	11
Anna Olasz	25 km	5:14:13.4	2nd place, silver medalist(s)
Éva Risztov	5 km	59:16.1	12
Éva Risztov	10 km	1:58:36.4	10

Mixed

Athlete	Event	Time	Rank
Gergely Gyurta; Éva Risztov; Dániel Székelyi	Team	56:08.4	7

== Swimming ==
Hungarian swimmers have achieved qualifying standards in the following events (up to a maximum of 2 swimmers in each event at the A-standard entry time, and 1 at the B-standard): Swimmers must qualify at the 2015 Hungarian Swimming Championships (for pool events) to confirm their places for the Worlds.

Men

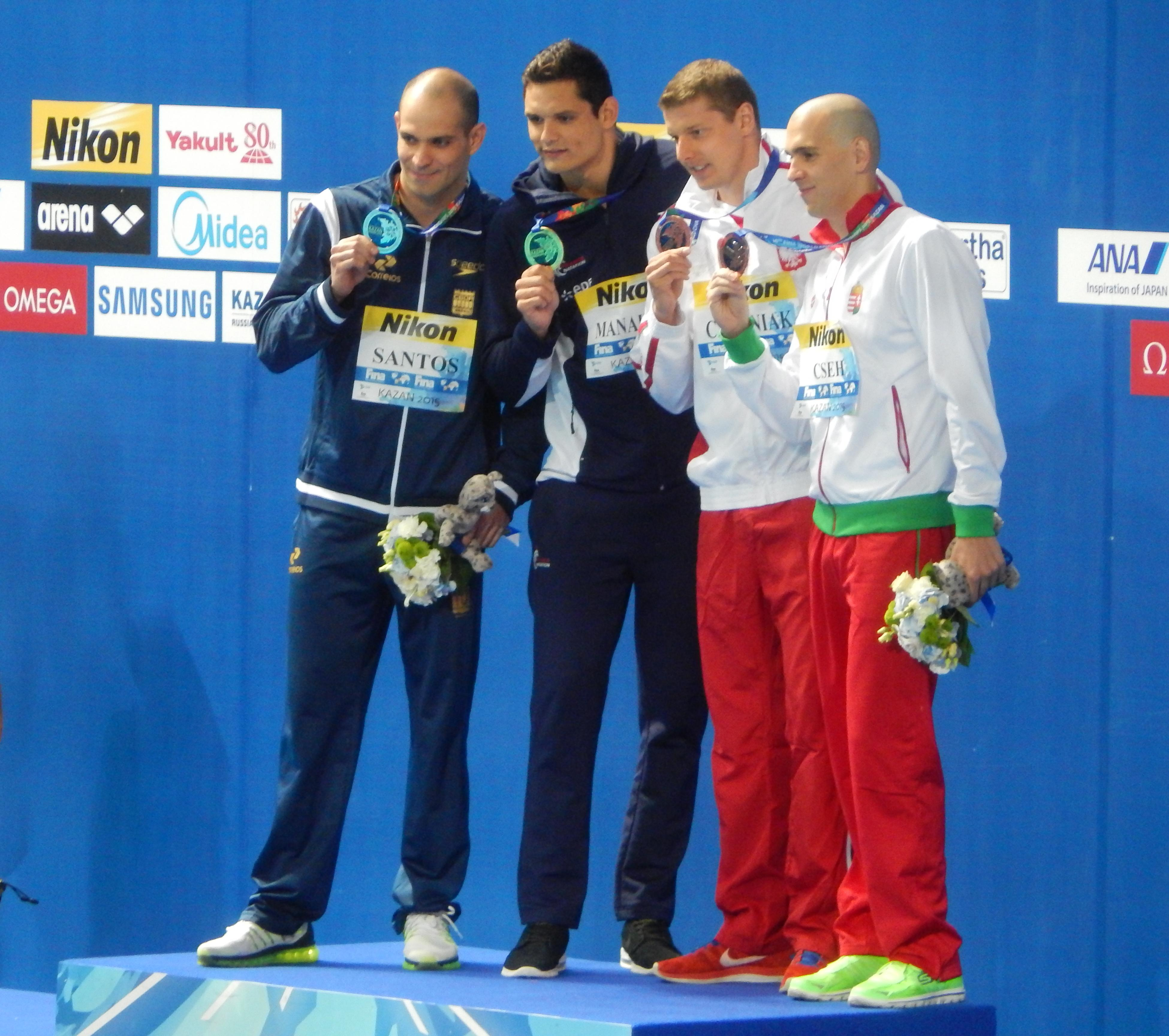
Victory Ceremony - 50 m butterfly

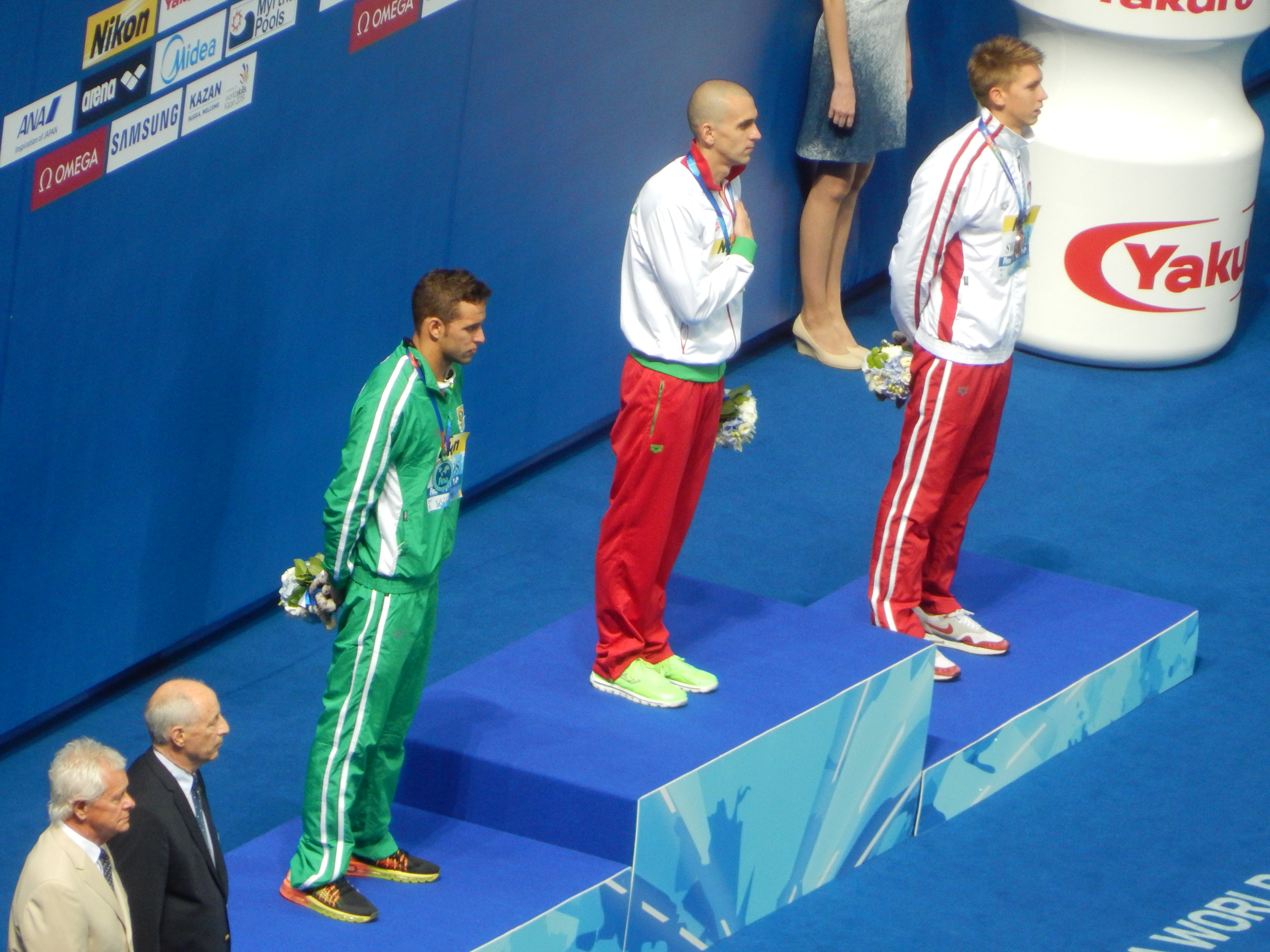
Victory Ceremony - 200 m butterfly

Athlete	Event	Heat		Semifinal		Final	
Athlete	Event	Time	Rank	Time	Rank	Time	Rank
Gábor Balog	50 m backstroke	DNS		Did not advance			
Gábor Balog	100 m backstroke	54.65	23	Did not advance			
Gábor Balog	200 m backstroke	1:58.55	16 Q	1:57.91	12	Did not advance	
Péter Bernek	200 m freestyle	1:49.25	34	Did not advance			
Péter Bernek	400 m freestyle	3:46.83	7 Q	—N/a		3:46.29	5
Péter Bernek	800 m freestyle	7:59.56	24	—N/a		Did not advance	
Péter Bernek	1500 m freestyle	DNS		—N/a		Did not advance	
László Cseh	50 m butterfly	23.32	2 Q	23.06	3 Q	23.15	3rd place, bronze medalist(s)
László Cseh	100 m butterfly	50.91 NR	1 Q	51.03	=1 Q	50.87	2nd place, silver medalist(s)
László Cseh	200 m butterfly	1:53.71	1 Q	1:53.53	1 Q	1:53.48	1st place, gold medalist(s)
László Cseh	200 m individual medley	DNS		Did not advance			
Benjámin Grátz	400 m individual medley	4:16.69	13	—N/a		Did not advance	
Dániel Gyurta	100 m breaststroke	1:00.71	22	Did not advance			
Dániel Gyurta	200 m breaststroke	2:09.81	5 Q	2:08.53	3 Q	2:08.10	3rd place, bronze medalist(s)
Gergely Gyurta	800 m freestyle	7:58.70	23	—N/a		Did not advance	
Gergely Gyurta	1500 m freestyle	15:16.84	20	—N/a		Did not advance	
Dávid Horváth	50 m breaststroke	28.40	37	Did not advance			
Krisztián Takács	50 m freestyle	22.21	8 Q	22.07	10	Did not advance	
Krisztián Takács	100 m freestyle	49.76	33	Did not advance			
Dávid Verrasztó	400 m individual medley	4:11.99	2 Q	—N/a		4:09.90	2nd place, silver medalist(s)
Gábor Balog; László Cseh; Dániel Gyurta; Krisztián Takács	4×100 m medley relay	DSQ		—N/a		Did not advance	

Women

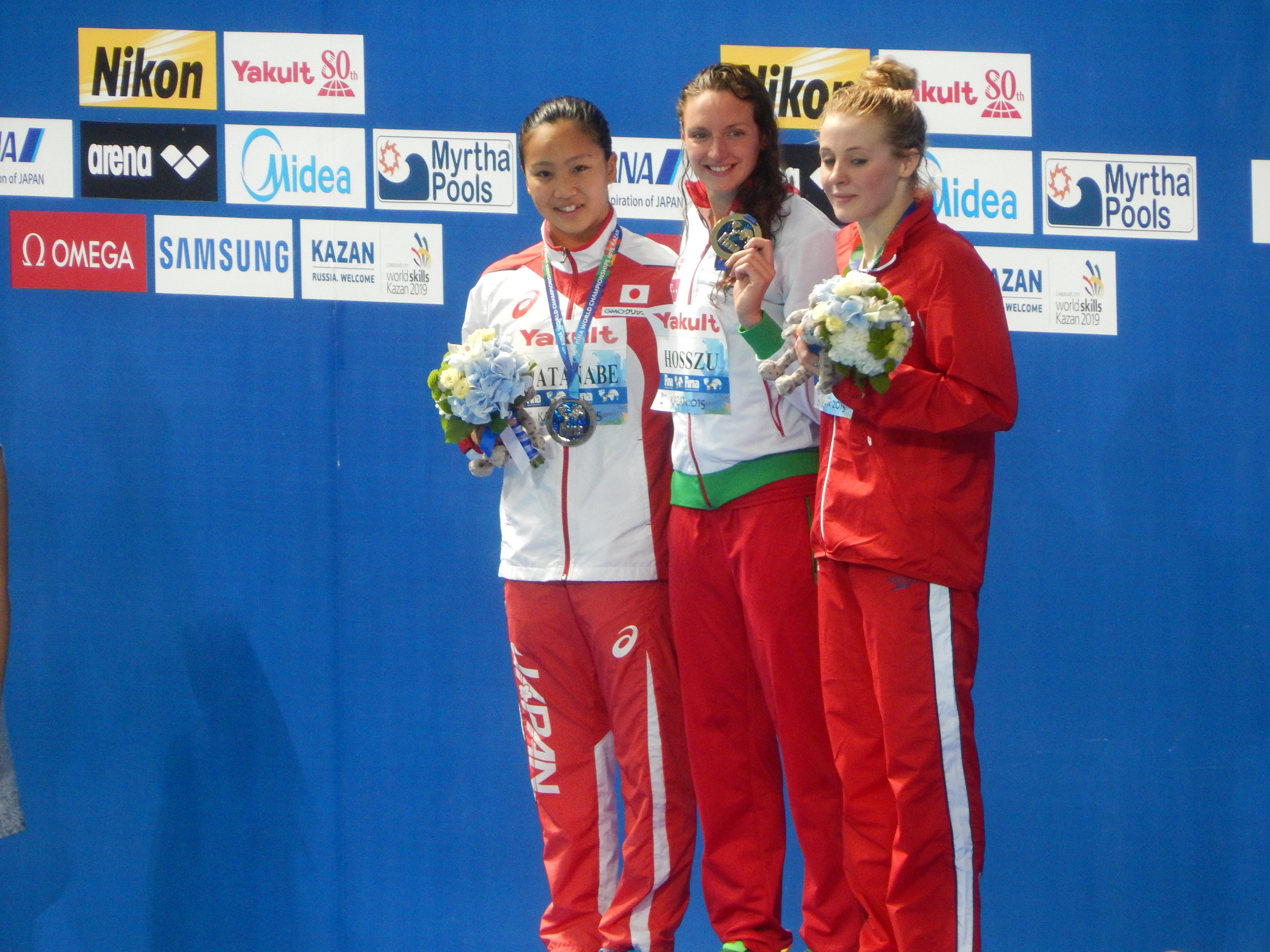
Victory Ceremony - 200 m medley

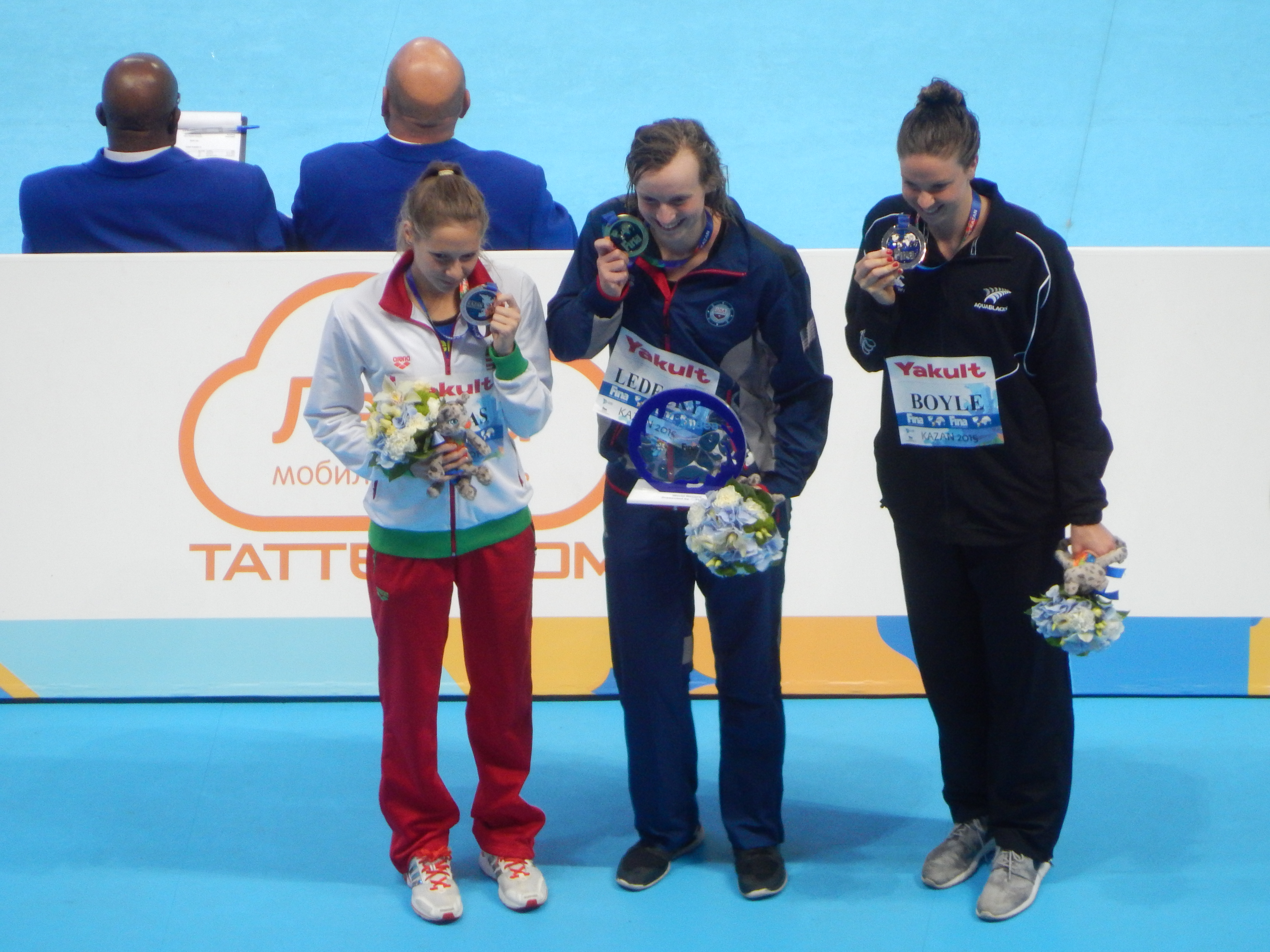
Victory Ceremony - 1500 m freestlye

Athlete	Event	Heat		Semifinal		Final	
Athlete	Event	Time	Rank	Time	Rank	Time	Rank
Katalin Burián	200 m backstroke	2:12.96	24	Did not advance			
Katinka Hosszú	100 m freestyle	DNS		Did not advance			
Katinka Hosszú	200 m freestyle	1:56.32	2 Q	1:56.51	5 Q	1:56.19	5
Katinka Hosszú	100 m backstroke	58.78 NR	1 Q	Withdrew			
Katinka Hosszú	200 m backstroke	2:07.17	1 Q	2:06.18	1 Q	2:06.84	3rd place, bronze medalist(s)
Katinka Hosszú	200 m butterfly	2:08.07	6 Q	2:08.91	13	Did not advance	
Katinka Hosszú	200 m individual medley	2:07.30 EU	1 Q	2:06.84 EU	1 Q	2:06.12 WR	1st place, gold medalist(s)
Katinka Hosszú	400 m individual medley	4:32.78	1 Q	—N/a		4:30.39	1st place, gold medalist(s)
Zsuzsanna Jakabos	50 m freestyle	25.79	35	Did not advance			
Zsuzsanna Jakabos	200 m individual medley	2:12.38	=9 Q	2:11.91	11	Did not advance	
Zsuzsanna Jakabos	400 m individual medley	4:38.94	11	—N/a		Did not advance	
Boglárka Kapás	400 m freestyle	4:06.21	5 Q	—N/a		4:08.22	8
Boglárka Kapás	800 m freestyle	8:26.96	8 Q	—N/a		8:22.93	6
Boglárka Kapás	1500 m freestyle	16:06.25	6 Q	—N/a		15:47.09 NR	3rd place, bronze medalist(s)
Liliána Szilágyi	50 m butterfly	DNS		Did not advance			
Liliána Szilágyi	100 m butterfly	DNS		Did not advance			
Liliána Szilágyi	200 m butterfly	2:07.46	3 Q	2:07.05	3 Q	2:07.76	7
Anna Sztankovics	50 m breaststroke	32.11	34	Did not advance			
Anna Sztankovics	100 m breaststroke	1:09.34	32	Did not advance			
Anna Sztankovics	200 m breaststroke	2:29.28	26	Did not advance			
Evelyn Verrasztó	200 m freestyle	2:00.72	30	Did not advance			
Evelyn Verrasztó	100 m butterfly	59.09	25	Did not advance			

Mixed

Athlete	Event	Heat		Semifinal		Final	
Athlete	Event	Time	Rank	Time	Rank	Time	Rank
Gábor Balog; Dávid Horváth; Evelyn Verrasztó; Zsuzsanna Jakabos	4×100 m medley relay	3:49.50	7 Q	—N/a		3:50.06	8

== Synchronized swimming ==
Hungary has qualified one synchronized swimmer for each of the following events at the World Championships.

Athlete	Event	Preliminaries		Final	
Athlete	Event	Points	Rank	Points	Rank
Eszter Czékus	Solo technical routine	76.5992	17	Did not advance	
Eszter Czékus	Solo free routine	79.4000	16	Did not advance	

== Water polo ==
=== Men's tournament ===
Team roster

- Viktor Nagy
- Miklós Gór-Nagy
- Norbert Madaras
- Balázs Erdélyi
- Márton Vámos
- Norbert Hosnyánszky
- Dániel Angyal
- Márton Szívós
- Dániel Varga
- Dénes Varga
- Krisztián Bedő
- Balázs Hárai
- Attila Decker

Group play

Pos	Team	Pld	W	D	L	GF	GA	GD	Pts	Qualification
1	Hungary	3	3	0	0	52	13	+39	6	Advanced to quarterfinals
2	Kazakhstan	3	2	0	1	34	24	+10	4	Advanced to playoffs
3	South Africa	3	1	0	2	17	37	−20	2	Advanced to playoffs
4	Argentina	3	0	0	3	17	46	−29	0	

Source: SportResult.com
Rules for classification: 1) points; 2) head-to-head points; 3) head-to-head goal difference; 4) head-to-head number of goals scored; 5) goal difference.

27 July 2015; 17:30	Report	Hungary	14–5	Kazakhstan	Kazan; Attendance: 1,180; Referees: Joseph Peila (USA), Cory Williams (NZL)
27 July 2015; 17:30	Report	Score by quarters: 4–0, 3–0, 5–2, 2–3			Kazan; Attendance: 1,180; Referees: Joseph Peila (USA), Cory Williams (NZL)
27 July 2015; 17:30	Report	Hárai 4	Goals	Ushakov 2	Kazan; Attendance: 1,180; Referees: Joseph Peila (USA), Cory Williams (NZL)

29 July 2015; 12:10	Report	South Africa	4–17	Hungary	Kazan; Attendance: 1,127; Referees: Fabio Toffoli (BRA), Peter de Jong (NED)
29 July 2015; 12:10	Report	Score by quarters: 1–5, 0–3, 2–4, 1–5			Kazan; Attendance: 1,127; Referees: Fabio Toffoli (BRA), Peter de Jong (NED)
29 July 2015; 12:10	Report	Molyneux 2	Goals	Dén. Varga 5	Kazan; Attendance: 1,127; Referees: Fabio Toffoli (BRA), Peter de Jong (NED)

31 July 2015; 10:50	Report	Hungary	21–4	Argentina	Kazan; Attendance: 1,065; Referees: Sergey Naumov (RUS), Peter de Jong (NED)
31 July 2015; 10:50	Report	Score by quarters: 6–2, 3–1, 6–1, 6–0			Kazan; Attendance: 1,065; Referees: Sergey Naumov (RUS), Peter de Jong (NED)
31 July 2015; 10:50	Report	Dén. Varga 5	Goals	López 2	Kazan; Attendance: 1,065; Referees: Sergey Naumov (RUS), Peter de Jong (NED)

Quarterfinals

4 August 2015; 20:10	Report	Hungary	7–8	Italy	Kazan; Attendance: 693; Referees: Adrian Alexandrescu (ROU), Georgios Stavridis (GRE)
4 August 2015; 20:10	Report	Score by quarters: 2–2, 2–1, 1–2, 2–3			Kazan; Attendance: 693; Referees: Adrian Alexandrescu (ROU), Georgios Stavridis (GRE)
4 August 2015; 20:10	Report	Dán. Varga 3	Goals	Di Fulvio, Luongo 2	Kazan; Attendance: 693; Referees: Adrian Alexandrescu (ROU), Georgios Stavridis (GRE)

5th–8th place semifinals

6 August 2015; 17:00	Report	Hungary	13–9	United States	Kazan; Attendance: 645; Referees: Massimiliano Caputi (ITA), Sergey Naumov (RUS)
6 August 2015; 17:00	Report	Score by quarters: 4–2, 3–2, 2–2, 4–3			Kazan; Attendance: 645; Referees: Massimiliano Caputi (ITA), Sergey Naumov (RUS)
6 August 2015; 17:00	Report	Hárai 4	Goals	Azevedo, Bonanni 3	Kazan; Attendance: 645; Referees: Massimiliano Caputi (ITA), Sergey Naumov (RUS)

Fifth place game

8 August 2015; 15:30	Report	Montenegro	10–9	Hungary	Kazan; Attendance: 2,365; Referees: Mark Koganov (AZE), Joseph Peila (USA)
8 August 2015; 15:30	Report	Score by quarters: 2–2, 2–1, 2–2, 4–4			Kazan; Attendance: 2,365; Referees: Mark Koganov (AZE), Joseph Peila (USA)
8 August 2015; 15:30	Report	Ivović 3	Goals	three players 2	Kazan; Attendance: 2,365; Referees: Mark Koganov (AZE), Joseph Peila (USA)

=== Women's tournament ===
Team roster

- Flóra Bolonyai
- Dóra Czigány
- Dóra Antal
- Dóra Kisteleki
- Gabriella Szűcs
- Orsolya Takács
- Anna Illés
- Rita Keszthelyi
- Ildikó Tóth
- Barbara Bujka
- Krisztina Garda
- Katalin Menczinger
- Edina Gangl

Group play

Pos	Team	Pld	W	D	L	GF	GA	GD	Pts	Qualification
1	Russia	3	2	1	0	38	25	+13	5	Advanced to quarterfinals
2	China	3	2	1	0	31	21	+10	5	Advanced to playoffs
3	Hungary	3	1	0	2	37	25	+12	2	Advanced to playoffs
4	France	3	0	0	3	12	47	−35	0	

Source: SportResult.com
Rules for classification: 1) points; 2) head-to-head points; 3) head-to-head goal difference; 4) head-to-head number of goals scored; 5) goal difference.

26 July 2015; 21:30	Report	Hungary	8–9	China	Kazan; Attendance: 200; Referees: Daniel Flahive (AUS), Nenad Peris (CRO)
26 July 2015; 21:30	Report	Score by quarters: 1–4, 4–1, 2–1, 1–3			Kazan; Attendance: 200; Referees: Daniel Flahive (AUS), Nenad Peris (CRO)
26 July 2015; 21:30	Report	Antal 2	Goals	Zhao Zihan 4	Kazan; Attendance: 200; Referees: Daniel Flahive (AUS), Nenad Peris (CRO)

28 July 2015; 18:50	Report	Hungary	11–13	Russia	Kazan; Attendance: 2,123; Referees: Nenad Peris (CRO), Joseph Peila (USA)
28 July 2015; 18:50	Report	Score by quarters: 3–1, 3–4, 4–3, 1–5			Kazan; Attendance: 2,123; Referees: Nenad Peris (CRO), Joseph Peila (USA)
28 July 2015; 18:50	Report	Keszthelyi 3	Goals	Lisunova 3	Kazan; Attendance: 2,123; Referees: Nenad Peris (CRO), Joseph Peila (USA)

30 July 2015; 12:10	Report	Hungary	18–3	France	Kazan; Attendance: 372; Referees: German Moller (ARG), Stanko Ivanovski (MNE)
30 July 2015; 12:10	Report	Score by quarters: 5–1, 1–1, 7–0, 5–1			Kazan; Attendance: 372; Referees: German Moller (ARG), Stanko Ivanovski (MNE)
30 July 2015; 12:10	Report	Bujka 6	Goals	Guillet 2	Kazan; Attendance: 372; Referees: German Moller (ARG), Stanko Ivanovski (MNE)

Playoffs

1 August 2015; 18:50	Report	United States	12–7	Hungary	Kazan; Attendance: 780; Referees: Ursula Wengenroth (SUI), Daniel Flahive (AUS)
1 August 2015; 18:50	Report	Score by quarters: 3–1, 4–1, 4–1, 1–4			Kazan; Attendance: 780; Referees: Ursula Wengenroth (SUI), Daniel Flahive (AUS)
1 August 2015; 18:50	Report	Fattal 4	Goals	Keszthelyi 3	Kazan; Attendance: 780; Referees: Ursula Wengenroth (SUI), Daniel Flahive (AUS)

9th–12th place semifinals

3 August 2015; 12:10	Report	Canada	7–10	Hungary	Kazan; Attendance: 274; Referees: Ursula Wengenroth (SUI), Cory Williams (NZL)
3 August 2015; 12:10	Report	Score by quarters: 1–2, 2–2, 3–2, 1–4			Kazan; Attendance: 274; Referees: Ursula Wengenroth (SUI), Cory Williams (NZL)
3 August 2015; 12:10	Report	Wright 2	Goals	Keszthelyi 4	Kazan; Attendance: 274; Referees: Ursula Wengenroth (SUI), Cory Williams (NZL)

Ninth place game

5 August 2015; 12:10	Report	Hungary	22–7	Brazil	Kazan; Attendance: 205; Referees: Ursula Wengenroth (SUI), Dion Willis (RSA)
5 August 2015; 12:10	Report	Score by quarters: 5–2, 6–2, 6–0, 5–3			Kazan; Attendance: 205; Referees: Ursula Wengenroth (SUI), Dion Willis (RSA)
5 August 2015; 12:10	Report	Keszthelyi 5	Goals	Chiappini, Zablith 2	Kazan; Attendance: 205; Referees: Ursula Wengenroth (SUI), Dion Willis (RSA)
