= Swimming at the 2015 World Aquatics Championships – Women's 200 metre individual medley =

Women's 200 metre individual medley at the 2015 World Aquatics Championships
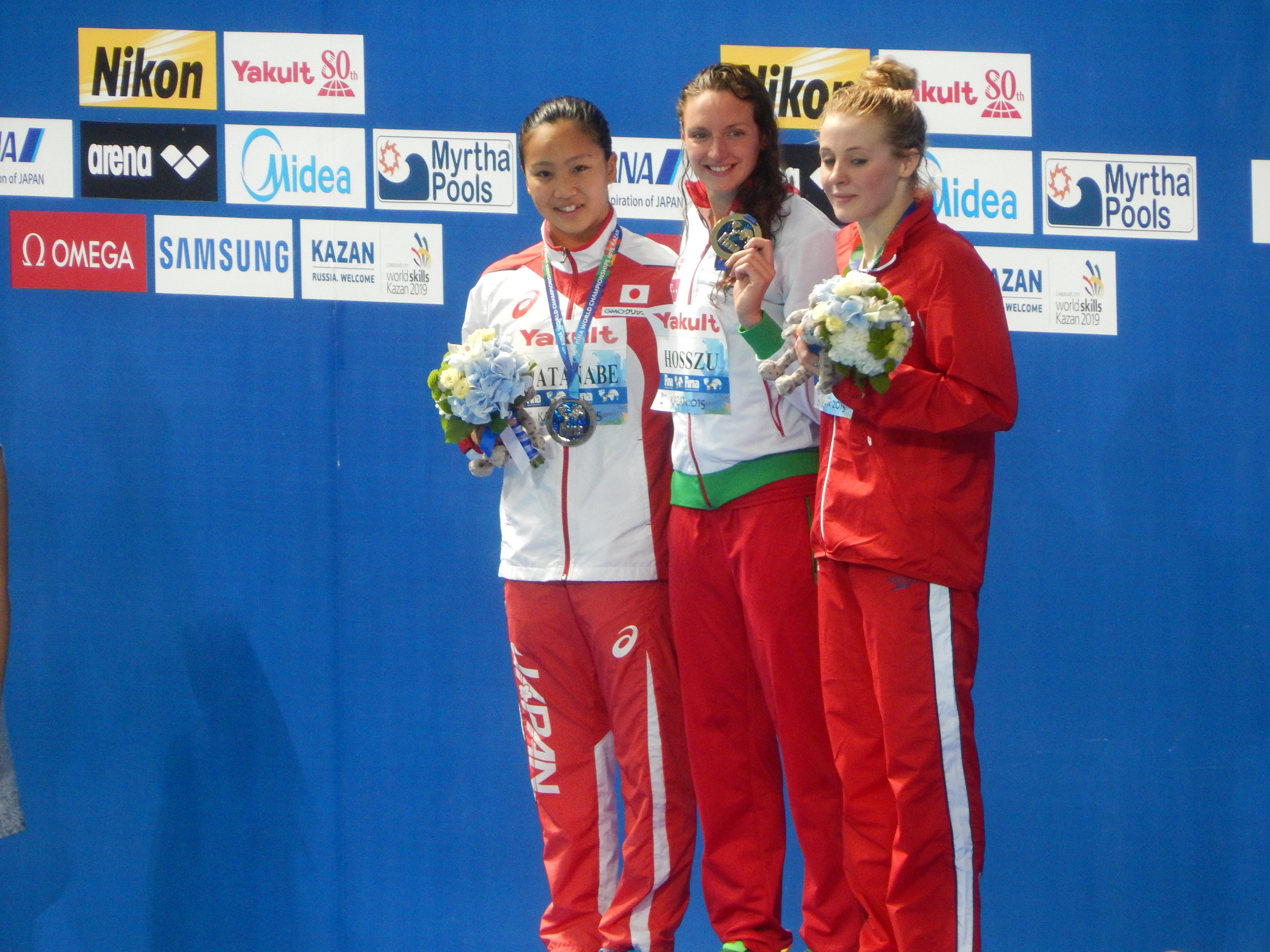
- Victory ceremony
- Dates: 2 August (heats and semifinals); 3 August (final)
- Competitors: 39 from 32 nations
- Winning time: 2:06.12 WR

Medalists
gold medal	Katinka Hosszú	Hungary
silver medal	Kanako Watanabe	Japan
bronze medal	Siobhan-Marie O'Connor	Great Britain

The Women's 200 metre individual medley competition of the swimming events at the 2015 World Aquatics Championships was held on 2 August with the heats and the semifinals and 3 August with the final.

== Records ==
Prior to the competition, the existing world and championship records were as follows.

World record	Ariana Kukors (USA)	2:06.15	Rome, Italy	27 July 2009
Competition record	Ariana Kukors (USA)	2:06.15	Rome, Italy	27 July 2009

The following records were established during the competition:

Date	Event	Name	Nation	Time	Record
3 August	Final	Katinka Hosszú	Hungary	2:06.12	WR

== Results ==
=== Heats ===
The heats were held on 2 August at 10:28.

Rank	Heat	Lane	Name	Nationality	Time	Notes
1	4	4	Katinka Hosszú	Hungary	2:07.30	Q, ER
2	3	4	Siobhan-Marie O'Connor	Great Britain	2:08.82	Q
3	4	5	Kanako Watanabe	Japan	2:10.37	Q
4	2	3	Sydney Pickrem	Canada	2:10.94	Q, NR
5	2	4	Ye Shiwen	China	2:11.23	Q
6	2	5	Melanie Margalis	United States	2:11.88	Q
7	4	3	Hannah Miley	Great Britain	2:12.22	Q
8	4	6	Sakiko Shimizu	Japan	2:12.27	Q
9	3	5	Maya DiRado	United States	2:12.38	Q
9	3	3	Zsuzsanna Jakabos	Hungary	2:12.38	Q
11	4	2	Joanna Maranhão	Brazil	2:12.74	Q
12	3	0	Viktoriya Zeynep Gunes	Turkey	2:12.91	Q
13	3	1	Siobhán Haughey	Hong Kong	2:13.07	Q, NR
14	2	1	Barbora Závadová	Czech Republic	2:13.12	Q
15	3	2	Tessa Wallace	Australia	2:13.23	Q
16	2	2	Nguyễn Thị Ánh Viên	Vietnam	2:13.41	Q
17	4	7	Keryn McMaster	Australia	2:13.42	
18	3	8	Lara Grangeon	France	2:13.50	
19	3	6	Lisa Zaiser	Austria	2:13.90	
20	2	8	Hrafnhildur Lúthersdóttir	Iceland	2:14.12	
21	3	7	Louise Hansson	Sweden	2:14.49	
22	4	1	Zhou Min	China	2:15.08	
22	4	8	Stina Gardell	Sweden	2:15.08	
24	3	9	Ranohon Amanova	Uzbekistan	2:15.13	
25	2	0	Kirsty Coventry	Zimbabwe	2:15.39	
26	4	0	Nam Yoo-sun	South Korea	2:16.58	
27	2	6	Viktoriya Andreyeva	Russia	2:16.85	
28	1	5	Victoria Kaminskaya	Portugal	2:16.89	
29	1	6	Ana Radić	Croatia	2:17.04	
30	2	7	Theresa Michalak	Germany	2:17.12	
31	1	4	Virginia Bardach	Argentina	2:17.24	
32	1	2	Phiangkhwan Pawapotako	Thailand	2:17.69	
33	4	9	Sycerika McMahon	Ireland	2:17.88	
34	2	9	Amit Ivry	Israel	2:18.35	
35	1	3	Anja Crevar	Serbia	2:21.51	
36	1	7	Georgina González	Mexico	2:24.33	
37	1	8	Alexus Laird	Seychelles	2:27.68	
38	1	1	Lydia Musleh	Jordan	2:27.94	
39	1	0	Estellah Fils Rabetsara	Madagascar	2:36.25	

=== Semifinals ===
The semifinals were held on 2 August at 17:53.

==== Semifinal 1 ====
Rank	Lane	Name	Nationality	Time	Notes
1	4	Siobhan-Marie O'Connor	Great Britain	2:08.45	Q
2	5	Sydney Pickrem	Canada	2:10.08	Q, NR
3	3	Melanie Margalis	United States	2:10.61	Q
4	7	Viktoriya Zeynep Gunes	Turkey	2:11.46	WJR, NR
5	6	Sakiko Shimizu	Japan	2:11.53	
6	2	Zsuzsanna Jakabos	Hungary	2:11.91	
7	1	Barbora Závadová	Czech Republic	2:11.97	NR
8	8	Nguyễn Thị Ánh Viên	Vietnam	2:13.29	

==== Semifinal 2 ====
Rank	Lane	Name	Nationality	Time	Notes
1	4	Katinka Hosszú	Hungary	2:06.84	Q, ER
2	5	Kanako Watanabe	Japan	2:09.61	Q, NR
3	2	Maya DiRado	United States	2:09.82	Q
4	6	Hannah Miley	Great Britain	2:11.19	Q
5	3	Ye Shiwen	China	2:11.39	Q
6	7	Joanna Maranhão	Brazil	2:12.64	
7	1	Siobhán Haughey	Hong Kong	2:13.26	
8	8	Tessa Wallace	Australia	2:14.34	

=== Final ===
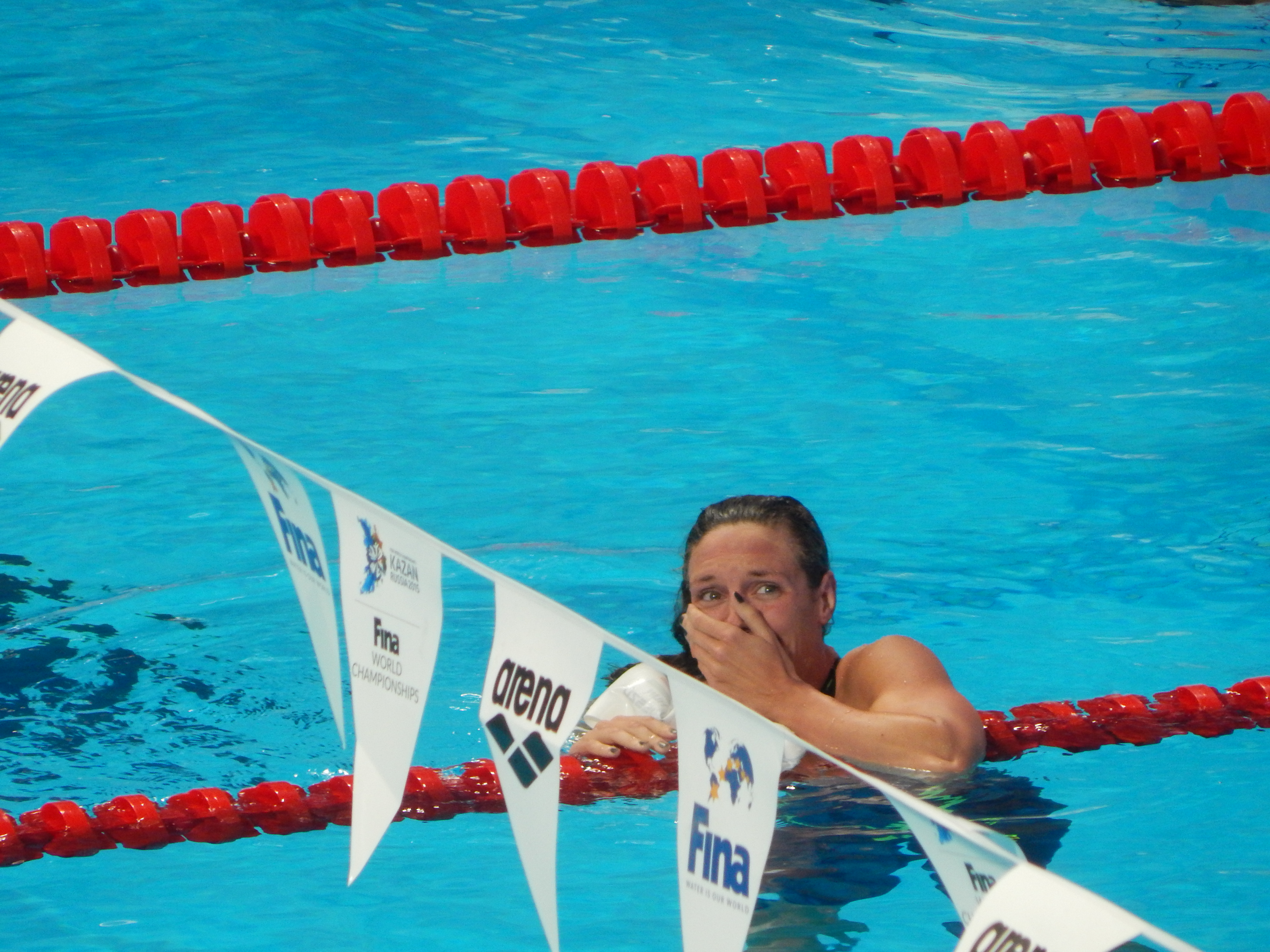
Hosszú sets new WR

The final was held on 3 August at 18:54.

Rank	Lane	Name	Nationality	Time	Notes
1st place, gold medalist(s)	4	Katinka Hosszú	Hungary	2:06.12	WR
2nd place, silver medalist(s)	3	Kanako Watanabe	Japan	2:08.45	NR
3rd place, bronze medalist(s)	5	Siobhan-Marie O'Connor	Great Britain	2:08.77	
4	6	Maya DiRado	United States	2:08.99	
5	1	Hannah Miley	Great Britain	2:10.19	
6	2	Sydney Pickrem	Canada	2:10.32	
7	7	Melanie Margalis	United States	2:10.41	
8	8	Ye Shiwen	China	2:14.01	
