= Sweden at the 2015 World Aquatics Championships =

- Flag of Sweden
- World Aquatics code: SWE
- National federation: Svenska Simidrott
- Website: www.svensksimidrott.se

in Kazan, Russia
- Competitors: 13 in 3 sports
- Medals Ranked 9th: Gold 3 Silver 2 Bronze 1 Total 6

World Aquatics Championships appearances (overview)
- 1973; 1975; 1978; 1982; 1986; 1991; 1994; 1998; 2001; 2003; 2005; 2007; 2009; 2011; 2013; 2015; 2017; 2019; 2022; 2023; 2024; 2025

Sweden competed at the 2015 World Aquatics Championships in Kazan, Russia from 24 July to 9 August 2015.

== Medalists ==
Medal	Name	Sport	Event	Date
Gold	Sarah Sjöström	Swimming	Women's 100 m butterfly	August 3
Gold	Sarah Sjöström	Swimming	Women's 50 m butterfly	August 8
Gold	Jennie Johansson	Swimming	Women's 50 m breaststroke	August 9
Silver	Sarah Sjöström	Swimming	Women's 100 m freestyle	August 7
Silver	Michelle Coleman; Jennie Johansson; Sarah Sjöström; Louise Hansson	Swimming	Women's 4×100 m medley relay	August 9
Bronze	Sarah Sjöström	Swimming	Women's 50 m freestyle	August 9

== Diving ==
Swedish divers qualified for the individual spots at the World Championships.

Men

Athlete	Event	Preliminaries		Semifinals		Final	
Athlete	Event	Points	Rank	Points	Rank	Points	Rank
Jesper Tolvers	3 m springboard	356.10	38	Did not advance			
Jesper Tolvers	10 m platform	366.35	32	Did not advance			

Women

Athlete	Event	Preliminaries		Semifinals		Final	
Athlete	Event	Points	Rank	Points	Rank	Points	Rank
Daniella Nero	1 m springboard	239.95	15	—N/a		Did not advance	
Daniella Nero	3 m springboard	246.00	31	Did not advance			

== Open water swimming ==
Sweden has qualified one open water swimmer.

Athlete	Event	Time	Rank
Ellen Olsson	Women's 5 km	1:04:47.1	30
Ellen Olsson	Women's 10 km	Did not start	

== Swimming ==
Swedish swimmers have achieved qualifying standards in the following events (up to a maximum of 2 swimmers in each event at the A-standard entry time, and 1 at the B-standard):

Men

Athlete	Event	Heat		Semifinal		Final	
Athlete	Event	Time	Rank	Time	Rank	Time	Rank
Christoffer Carlsen	50 m freestyle	22.61	23	Did not advance			
Christoffer Carlsen	100 m freestyle	49.78	34	Did not advance			
Christoffer Carlsen	50 m butterfly	24.18	=30	Did not advance			
Erik Persson	100 m breaststroke	1:01.75	32	Did not advance			
Erik Persson	200 m breaststroke	2:10.41	11 Q	2:10.87	14	Did not advance	
Simon Sjödin	100 m butterfly	53.40	34	Did not advance			
Simon Sjödin	200 m individual medley	1:59.64	12 Q	1:58.10	5 Q	1:59.06	8

Women

Athlete	Event	Heat		Semifinal		Final	
Athlete	Event	Time	Rank	Time	Rank	Time	Rank
Michelle Coleman	50 m freestyle	DNS		Did not advance			
Michelle Coleman	100 m freestyle	54.10	9 Q	54.22	11	Did not advance	
Michelle Coleman	200 m freestyle	1:58.11	10 Q	1:58.12	13	Did not advance	
Michelle Coleman	100 m backstroke	1:00.55	=12 Q	Withdrew			
Stina Gardell	200 m individual medley	2:15.08	=22	Did not advance			
Stina Gardell	400 m individual medley	4:48.65	25	—N/a		Did not advance	
Louise Hansson	200 m freestyle	1:59.34	19	Did not advance			
Louise Hansson	200 m individual medley	2:14.49	21	Did not advance			
Jennie Johansson	50 m breaststroke	30.30	3 Q	30.39	4 Q	30.05	1st place, gold medalist(s)
Jennie Johansson	100 m breaststroke	1:07.09	=8 Q	1:06.76	6 Q	1:07.17	7
Magdalena Kuras	50 m backstroke	29.33	30	Did not advance			
Ida Marko-Varga	200 m butterfly	2:14.89	28	Did not advance			
Sarah Sjöström	50 m freestyle	24.53	3 Q	24.31	3 Q	24.31	3rd place, bronze medalist(s)
Sarah Sjöström	100 m freestyle	53.22	=1 Q	52.78	1 Q	52.70	2nd place, silver medalist(s)
Sarah Sjöström	50 m butterfly	25.43	1 Q	25.06 CR	1 Q	24.96 CR	1st place, gold medalist(s)
Sarah Sjöström	100 m butterfly	56.47	1 Q	55.74 WR	1 Q	55.64 WR	1st place, gold medalist(s)
Michelle Coleman; Louise Hansson; Sarah Sjöström; Magdalena Kuras	4×100 m freestyle relay	3:36.24	4 Q	—N/a		3:35.71	4
Sarah Sjöström; Louise Hansson; Michelle Coleman; Ida Marko-Varga; Stina Gardell*	4×200 m freestyle relay	7:53.57	4 Q	—N/a		7:50.24	4
Michelle Coleman; Louise Hansson; Jennie Johansson; Sarah Sjöström	4×100 m medley relay	3:57.29	3 Q	—N/a		3:55.24 EU	2nd place, silver medalist(s)

Mixed

Athlete	Event	Heat		Final	
Athlete	Event	Time	Rank	Time	Rank
Christoffer Carlsen; Simon Sjödin; Michelle Coleman; Louise Hansson	4×100 m freestyle relay	3:26.60	4 Q	2:27.09	8
