= Swimming at the 2015 World Aquatics Championships =

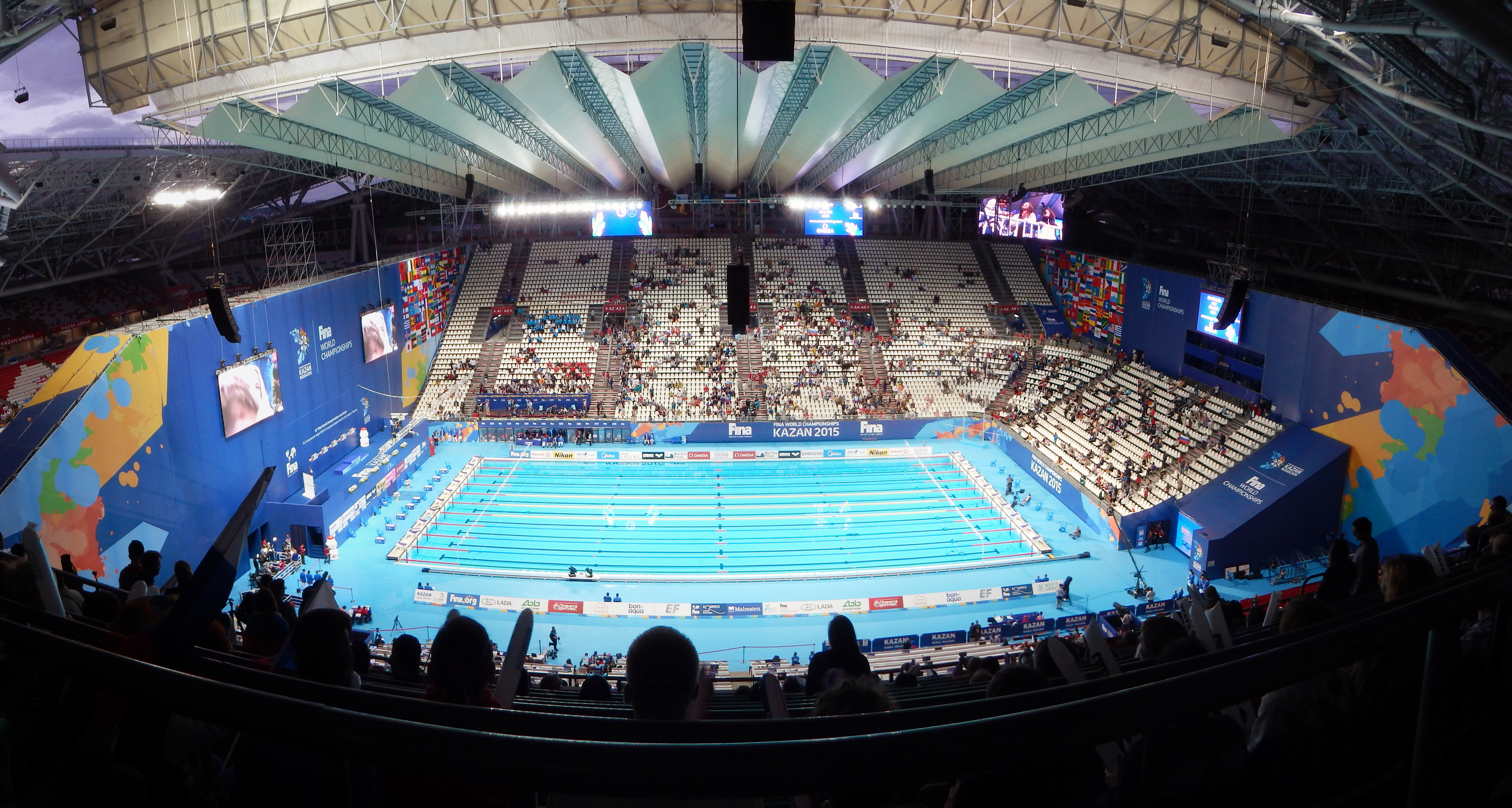
- Host city: Kazan, Russia
- Date: 2–9 August
- Venue: Kazan Arena
- Events: 42

Swimming at the 2015 World Aquatics Championships was held between 2 and 9 August 2015 in Kazan, Russia. The United States won the overall medal count, led by Katie Ledecky who claimed five gold medals.

== Schedule ==
42 events were held.

All time are local (UTC+3).

H	Heats	½	Semifinals	F	Final

M = Morning session (starting at 09:30), E = Evening session (starting at 17:30)

Men
Date →	Sun 2		Mon 3		Tue 4		Wed 5		Thu 6		Fri 7		Sat 8		Sun 9	
Event ↓	M	E	M	E	M	E	M	E	M	E	M	E	M	E	M	E
50 m freestyle											H	½		F		
100 m freestyle							H	½		F						
200 m freestyle			H	½		F										
400 m freestyle	H	F														
800 m freestyle					H			F								
1500 m freestyle													H			F
50 m backstroke													H	½		F
100 m backstroke			H	½		F										
200 m backstroke									H	½		F				
50 m breaststroke					H	½		F								
100 m breaststroke	H	½		F												
200 m breaststroke									H	½		F				
50 m butterfly	H	½		F												
100 m butterfly											H	½		F		
200 m butterfly					H	½		F								
200 m individual medley							H	½		F						
400 m individual medley															H	F
4 × 100 m freestyle relay	H	F														
4 × 200 m freestyle relay											H	F				
4 × 100 m medley relay															H	F

Women
Date →	Sun 2		Mon 3		Tue 4		Wed 5		Thu 6		Fri 7		Sat 8		Sun 9	
Event ↓	M	E	M	E	M	E	M	E	M	E	M	E	M	E	M	E
50 m freestyle													H	½		F
100 m freestyle									H	½		F				
200 m freestyle					H	½		F								
400 m freestyle	H	F														
800 m freestyle											H			F		
1500 m freestyle			H			F										
50 m backstroke							H	½		F						
100 m backstroke			H	½		F										
200 m backstroke											H	½		F		
50 m breaststroke													H	½		F
100 m breaststroke			H	½		F										
200 m breaststroke									H	½		F				
50 m butterfly											H	½		F		
100 m butterfly	H	½		F												
200 m butterfly							H	½		F						
200 m individual medley	H	½		F												
400 m individual medley															H	F
4 × 100 m freestyle relay	H	F														
4 × 200 m freestyle relay									H	F						
4 × 100 m medley relay															H	F

Mixed
Date →	Sun 2		Mon 3		Tue 4		Wed 5		Thu 6		Fri 7		Sat 8		Sun 9	
Event ↓	M	E	M	E	M	E	M	E	M	E	M	E	M	E	M	E
4 × 100 m freestyle relay													H	F		
4 × 100 m medley relay							H	F								

== Medal summary ==
=== Medal table ===
* Host nation (Russia)

Rank	Nation	Gold	Silver	Bronze	Total
1	United States	8	10	5	23
2	Australia	7	3	6	16
3	China	5	1	7	13
4	Great Britain	5	1	3	9
5	France	4	1	1	6
6	Hungary	3	2	4	9
7	Sweden	3	2	1	6
8	Japan	3	1	0	4
9	Italy	1	3	1	5
10	South Africa	1	3	0	4
11	Russia*	1	1	2	4
12	Germany	1	0	2	3
13	Netherlands	0	4	0	4
14	Brazil	0	3	1	4
15	Denmark	0	2	2	4
16	New Zealand	0	2	0	2
17	Poland	0	1	2	3
18	Jamaica	0	1	1	2
19	Lithuania	0	1	0	1
20	Canada	0	0	4	4
21	Argentina	0	0	1	1
21	Singapore	0	0	1	1
21	Spain	0	0	1	1
Totals (23 entries)		42	42	45	129

=== Men ===
Event	Gold		Silver		Bronze	
50 m freestyle	Florent Manaudou; France	21.19	Nathan Adrian; United States	21.52	Bruno Fratus; Brazil	21.55
100 m freestyle	Ning Zetao; China	47.84	Cameron McEvoy; Australia	47.95	Federico Grabich; Argentina	48.12
200 m freestyle	James Guy; Great Britain	1:45.14; NR	Sun Yang; China	1:45.20	Paul Biedermann; Germany	1:45.38
400 m freestyle	Sun Yang; China	3:42.58	James Guy; Great Britain	3:43.75; NR	Ryan Cochrane; Canada	3:44.59
800 m freestyle	Sun Yang; China	7:39.96	Gregorio Paltrinieri; Italy	7:40.81; ER	Mack Horton; Australia	7:44.02
1500 m freestyle	Gregorio Paltrinieri; Italy	14:39.67; ER	Connor Jaeger; United States	14:41.20; NR	Ryan Cochrane; Canada	14:51.08
50 m backstroke	Camille Lacourt; France	24.23	Matt Grevers; United States	24.61	Ben Treffers; Australia	24.69
100 m backstroke	Mitch Larkin; Australia	52.40	Camille Lacourt; France	52.48	Matt Grevers; United States	52.66
200 m backstroke	Mitch Larkin; Australia	1:53.58; OC	Radosław Kawęcki; Poland	1:54.55	Evgeny Rylov; Russia	1:54:60; NR
50 m breaststroke	Adam Peaty; Great Britain	26.51	Cameron van der Burgh; South Africa	26.66	Kevin Cordes; United States	26.86
100 m breaststroke	Adam Peaty; Great Britain	58.52	Cameron van der Burgh; South Africa	58.59	Ross Murdoch; Great Britain	59.09
200 m breaststroke	Marco Koch; Germany	2:07.76	Kevin Cordes; United States	2:08.05	Dániel Gyurta; Hungary	2:08.10
50 m butterfly	Florent Manaudou; France	22.97	Nicholas Santos; Brazil	23.09	László Cseh; Hungary; Konrad Czerniak; Poland	23.15
100 m butterfly	Chad le Clos; South Africa	50.56; AF	László Cseh; Hungary	50.87; NR	Joseph Schooling; Singapore	50.96; AS
200 m butterfly	László Cseh; Hungary	1:53.48	Chad le Clos; South Africa	1:53.68	Jan Świtkowski; Poland	1:54.10
200 m individual medley	Ryan Lochte; United States	1:55.81	Thiago Pereira; Brazil	1:56.65	Wang Shun; China	1:56.81; NR
400 m individual medley	Daiya Seto; Japan	4:08.50	Dávid Verrasztó; Hungary	4:09.90	Chase Kalisz; United States	4:10.05
4 × 100 m freestyle relay	France; Mehdy Metella (48.37); Florent Manaudou (47.93); Fabien Gilot (47.08); Jérémy Stravius (47.36); Lorys Bourelly^{[a]} Clément Mignon^{[a]}	3:10.74	Russia; Andrey Grechin (48.60); Nikita Lobintsev (47.98); Vladimir Morozov (46.95); Alexandr Sukhorukov (47.66); Danila Izotov^{[a]}	3:11.19	Italy; Luca Dotto (48.75); Marco Orsi (47.75); Michele Santucci (48.48); Filippo Magnini (47.55)	3:12.53
4 × 200 m freestyle relay	Great Britain; Daniel Wallace (1:47.04); Robert Renwick (1:45.98); Calum Jarvis (1:46.57); James Guy (1:44.74); Nicholas Grainger^{[a]} Duncan Scott^{[a]}	7:04.33; NR	United States; Ryan Lochte (1:45.71); Conor Dwyer (1:45.33); Reed Malone (1:46.92); Michael Weiss (1:46.79); Michael Klueh^{[a]}	7:04.75	Australia; Cameron McEvoy (1:46.46); David McKeon (1:47.05); Daniel Smith (1:46.38); Thomas Fraser-Holmes (1:45.45); Grant Hackett^{[a]} Kurt Herzog^{[a]}	7:05.34
4 × 100 m medley relay	United States; Ryan Murphy (53.05); Kevin Cordes (58.88); Tom Shields (50.59); Nathan Adrian (47.41); Matt Grevers^{[a]} Cody Miller^{[a]} Tim Phillips^{[a]} Ryan Lochte^{[a]}	3:29.93	Australia; Mitch Larkin (52.41); Jake Packard (59.16); Jayden Hadler (51.91); Cameron McEvoy (46.60); David Morgan^{[a]} Kyle Chalmers^{[a]}	3:30.08	France; Camille Lacourt (52.81); Giacomo Perez-Dortona (59.88); Mehdy Metella (50.39); Fabien Gilot (47.42)	3:30.50
AF African record | AM Americas record | AS Asian record | CR Championship record | ER European record | OC Oceania record | WR World record | NR National record^{a} Swimmers who participated in the heats only and received medals.

=== Women ===
Event	Gold		Silver		Bronze	
50 m freestyle	Bronte Campbell; Australia	24.12	Ranomi Kromowidjojo; Netherlands	24.22	Sarah Sjöström; Sweden	24.31
100 m freestyle	Bronte Campbell; Australia	52.52	Sarah Sjöström; Sweden	52.70	Cate Campbell; Australia	52.82
200 m freestyle	Katie Ledecky; United States	1:55.16	Federica Pellegrini; Italy	1:55.32	Missy Franklin; United States	1:55.49
400 m freestyle	Katie Ledecky; United States	3:59.13; CR	Sharon van Rouwendaal; Netherlands	4:03.02; NR	Jessica Ashwood; Australia	4:03.34; OC
800 m freestyle	Katie Ledecky; United States	8:07.39; WR	Lauren Boyle; New Zealand	8:17.65; OC	Jazmin Carlin; Great Britain	8:18.15
1500 m freestyle	Katie Ledecky; United States	15:25.48; WR	Lauren Boyle; New Zealand	15:40.14; OC	Boglárka Kapás; Hungary	15:47.09; NR
50 m backstroke	Fu Yuanhui; China	27.11	Etiene Medeiros; Brazil	27.26; AM	Liu Xiang; China	27.58
100 m backstroke	Emily Seebohm; Australia	58.26	Madison Wilson; Australia	58.75	Mie Nielsen; Denmark	58.86
200 m backstroke	Emily Seebohm; Australia	2:05.81; OC	Missy Franklin; United States	2:06.34	Katinka Hosszú; Hungary	2:06.84
50 m breaststroke	Jennie Johansson; Sweden	30.05; NR	Alia Atkinson; Jamaica	30.11; NR	Yuliya Yefimova; Russia	30.13
100 m breaststroke	Yuliya Yefimova; Russia	1:05.66	Rūta Meilutytė; Lithuania	1:06.36	Alia Atkinson; Jamaica	1:06.42
200 m breaststroke	Kanako Watanabe; Japan	2:21.15	Micah Lawrence; United States	2:22.44	Jessica Vall; Spain; Rikke Møller Pedersen; Denmark; Shi Jinglin; China	2:22.76; NR 2:22.76
50 m butterfly	Sarah Sjöström; Sweden	24.96; CR	Jeanette Ottesen; Denmark	25.34	Lu Ying; China	25.37; AS
100 m butterfly	Sarah Sjöström; Sweden	55.64; WR	Jeanette Ottesen; Denmark	57.05	Lu Ying; China	57.48
200 m butterfly	Natsumi Hoshi; Japan	2:05.56	Cammile Adams; United States	2:06.40	Zhang Yufei; China	2:06.51; WJ
200 m individual medley	Katinka Hosszú; Hungary	2:06.12; WR	Kanako Watanabe; Japan	2:08.45; NR	Siobhan-Marie O'Connor; Great Britain	2:08.77
400 m individual medley	Katinka Hosszú; Hungary	4:30.39	Maya DiRado; United States	4:31.71	Emily Overholt; Canada	4:32.52; NR
4 × 100 m freestyle relay	Australia; Emily Seebohm (53.92); Emma McKeon (53.57); Bronte Campbell (51.77); Cate Campbell (52.22); Madison Wilson^{[b]} Melanie Wright^{[b]} Bronte Barratt^{[b]}	3:31.48; CR	Netherlands; Ranomi Kromowidjojo (53.30); Maud van der Meer (54.50); Marrit Steenbergen (53.88); Femke Heemskerk (51.99)	3:33.67	United States; Missy Franklin (53.68); Margo Geer (54.14); Lia Neal (53.70); Simone Manuel (53.09); Shannon Vreeland^{[b]} Abbey Weitzeil^{[b]}	3:34.61
4 × 200 m freestyle relay	United States; Missy Franklin (1:55.95); Leah Smith (1:56.86); Katie McLaughlin (1:56.92); Katie Ledecky (1:55.64); Cierra Runge^{[b]} Chelsea Chenault^{[b]} Shannon Vreeland^{[b]}	7:45.37	Italy; Alice Mizzau (1:57.50); Erica Musso (1:58.66); Chiara Masini Luccetti (1:57.52); Federica Pellegrini (1:54.73)	7:48.41	China; Qiu Yuhan (1:56.88); Guo Junjun (1:57.55); Zhang Yufei (1:58.73); Shen Duo (1:55.94); Shao Yiwen^{[b]} Zhang Yuhan^{[b]}	7:49.10
4 × 100 m medley relay	China; Fu Yuanhui (59.29); Shi Jinglin (1:05.56); Lu Ying (56.56); Shen Duo (53.00); Chen Xinyi^{[b]} Qiu Yuhan^{[b]}	3:54.41	Sweden; Michelle Coleman (1:00.74); Jennie Johansson (1:05.63); Sarah Sjöström (55.28); Louise Hansson (53.59)	3:55.24; ER	Australia; Emily Seebohm (58.81); Taylor McKeown (1:07.38); Emma McKeon (57.59); Bronte Campbell (51.78); Madison Wilson^{[b]} Lorna Tonks^{[b]} Madeline Groves^{[b]} Melanie Wright^{[b]}	3:55.56
AF African record | AM Americas record | AS Asian record | CR Championship record | ER European record | OC Oceania record | WR World record | NR National record^{b} Swimmers who participated in the heats only and received medals.

=== Mixed ===
Event	Gold		Silver		Bronze	
4 × 100 m freestyle relay	United States; Ryan Lochte (48.79); Nathan Adrian (47.29); Simone Manuel (53.66); Missy Franklin (53.31); Conor Dwyer^{[c]} Margo Geer^{[c]} Abbey Weitzeil^{[c]}	3:23.05; WR	Netherlands; Sebastiaan Verschuren (48.74); Joost Reijns (49.09); Ranomi Kromowidjojo (52.48); Femke Heemskerk (52.79); Kyle Stolk^{[c]} Marrit Steenbergen^{[c]}	3:23.10; ER	Canada; Santo Condorelli (48.19); Yuri Kisil (48.25); Sandrine Mainville (53.60); Chantal van Landeghem (53.55); Karl Krug^{[c]} Victoria Poon^{[c]}	3:23.59; NR
4 × 100 m medley relay	Great Britain; Chris Walker-Hebborn (52.94); Adam Peaty (57.98); Siobhan-Marie O'Connor (57.02); Fran Halsall (53.77); Ross Murdoch^{[c]} Rachael Kelly^{[c]}	3:41.71; WR	United States; Ryan Murphy (53.31); Kevin Cordes (58.63); Katie McLaughlin (57.56); Margo Geer (53.77); Kendyl Stewart^{[c]} Lia Neal^{[c]}	3:43.27; AM	Germany; Jan-Philip Glania (53.52); Hendrik Feldwehr (59.16); Alexandra Wenk (57.21); Annika Bruhn (54.24)	3:44.13; NR
AF African record | AM Americas record | AS Asian record | CR Championship record | ER European record | OC Oceania record | WR World record | NR National record^{c} Swimmers who participated in the heats only and received medals.

== Records ==
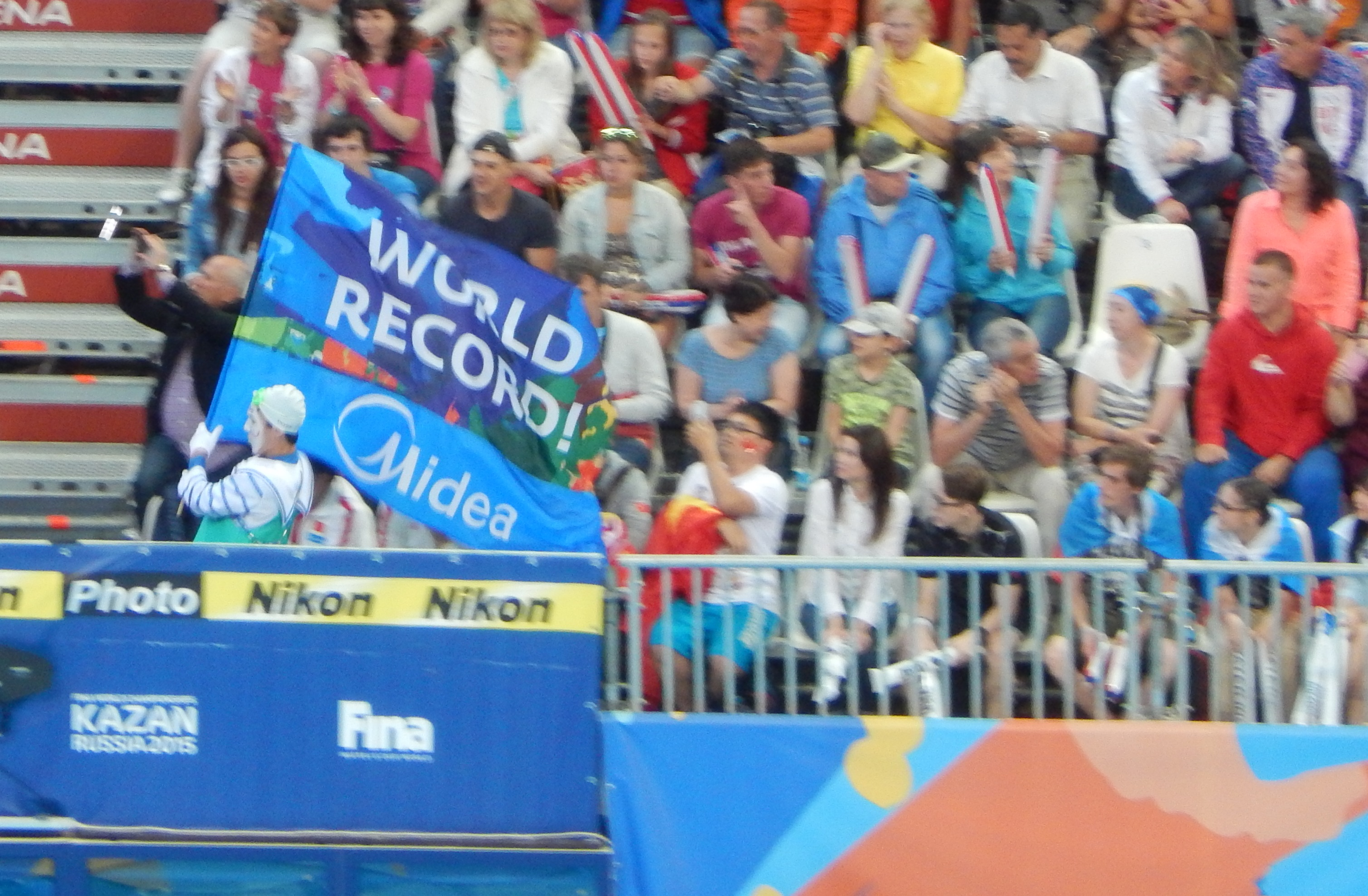
World Record flag and its bearer

The following world and championship records were broken during the competition.

=== World records ===
Date	Event	Time	Name	Nation
August 2	Women's 100 m butterfly semifinals	55.74	Sarah Sjöström	Sweden
August 3	Women's 1500 m freestyle heats	15:27.71	Katie Ledecky	United States
August 3	Women's 100 m butterfly final	55.64	Sarah Sjöström	Sweden
August 3	Women's 200 individual medley final	2:06.12	Katinka Hosszú	Hungary
August 4	Men's 50 m breaststroke heats	26.62	Cameron van der Burgh	South Africa
August 4	Men's 50 m breaststroke semifinals	26.42	Adam Peaty	Great Britain
August 4	Women's 1500 m freestyle final	15:25.48	Katie Ledecky	United States
August 5	Mixed 4 × 100 m medley relay heats	3:42.33	Ryan Murphy (52.18); Kevin Cordes (58.33); Kendyl Stewart (57.78); Lia Neal (54.04)	United States
August 5	Mixed 4 × 100 m medley relay final	3:41.71	Chris Walker-Hebborn (52.94); Adam Peaty (57.98); Siobhan-Marie O'Connor (57.02); Fran Halsall (53.77	Great Britain
August 8	Women's 800 m freestyle final	8:07.39	Katie Ledecky	United States
August 8	Mixed 4 × 100 m freestyle relay final	3:23.05	Ryan Lochte (48.79); Nathan Adrian (47.29); Simone Manuel (53.66); Missy Franklin (53.31)	United States

=== Championship records ===
Date	Event	Established for	Time	Name	Nation
August 2	Women's 400 m freestyle final	(same)	3:59.13	Katie Ledecky	United States
August 2	Men's 100 m breaststroke heats	(same)	58.52	Adam Peaty	Great Britain
August 2	Men's 100 m breaststroke semifinals	(same)	58.49	Cameron van der Burgh	South Africa
August 2	Men's 100 m breaststroke semifinals	(same)	58.18	Adam Peaty	Great Britain
August 2	Women's 4 × 100 m freestyle relay final	(same)	3:31.48	Emily Seebohm (53.92); Emma McKeon (53.57); Bronte Campbell (51.77); Cate Campbell (52.22)	Australia
August 4	Women's 1500 m freestyle final	Women's 800 m freestyle	8:13.25	Katie Ledecky	United States
August 7	Women's 50 m butterfly semifinals	(same)	25.06	Sarah Sjöström	Sweden
August 7	Women's 50 m butterfly final	(same)	24.96	Sarah Sjöström	Sweden

== See also ==
- FINA World Swimming Championships (25 m)
