= Swimming at the 2015 World Aquatics Championships – Men's 100 metre breaststroke =

Men's 100 metre breaststroke at the 2015 World Aquatics Championships
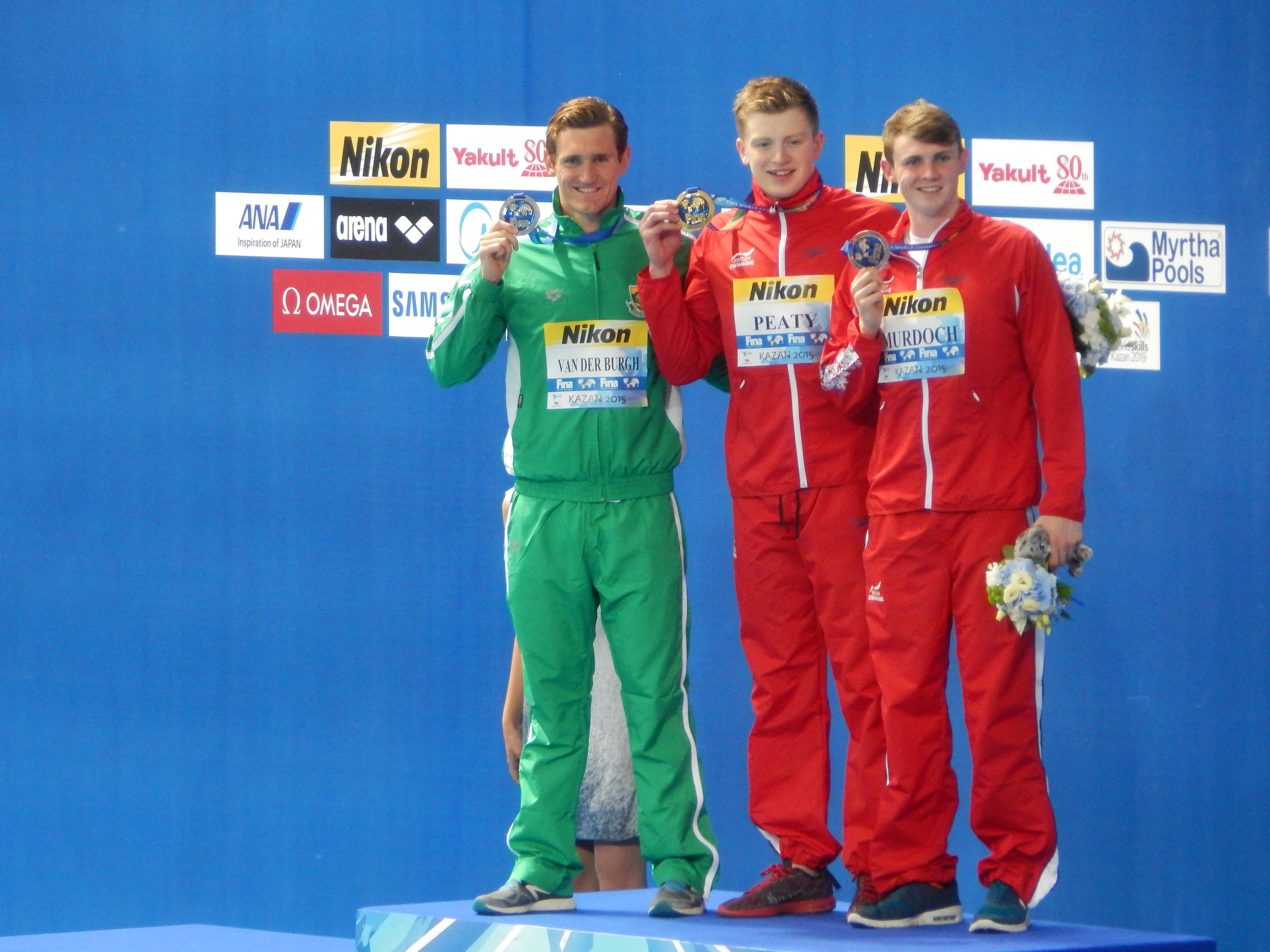
- Victory Ceremony
- Dates: 2 August (heats and semifinals); 3 August (final)
- Competitors: 77 from 71 nations
- Winning time: 58.52

Medalists
gold medal	Adam Peaty	Great Britain
silver medal	Cameron van der Burgh	South Africa
bronze medal	Ross Murdoch	Great Britain

The Men's 100 metre breaststroke competition of the swimming events at the 2015 World Aquatics Championships was held on 2 August with the heats and the semifinals and 3 August with the final.

== Records ==
Prior to the competition, the existing world and championship records were as follows.

World record	Adam Peaty (GBR)	57.92	London, Great Britain	17 April 2015
Competition record	Brenton Rickard (AUS)	58.58	Rome, Italy	27 July 2009

The following new records were set during this competition.

Date	Event	Name	Nationality	Time	Record
2 August	Heat 9	Adam Peaty	Great Britain	58.52	CR
2 August	Semifinal 1	Cameron van der Burgh	South Africa	58.49	CR
2 August	Semifinal 2	Adam Peaty	Great Britain	58.18	CR

== Results ==
=== Heats ===
The heats were held at 11:34.

Rank	Heat	Lane	Name	Nationality	Time	Notes
1	9	4	Adam Peaty	Great Britain	58.52	Q, CR
2	8	5	Cameron van der Burgh	South Africa	58.59	Q
3	9	2	Dmitriy Balandin	Kazakhstan	59.38	Q
4	7	4	Ross Murdoch	Great Britain	59.48	Q
5	9	5	Felipe França Silva	Brazil	59.56	Q
6	7	6	Hendrik Feldwehr	Germany	59.67	Q
7	9	0	Kirill Prigoda	Russia	59.81	Q
8	7	5	Giedrius Titenis	Lithuania	59.84	Q
9	9	1	Jake Packard	Australia	59.92	Q
10	7	3	Yasuhiro Koseki	Japan	59.93	Q
11	9	3	Cody Miller	United States	59.97	Q
12	7	7	Christian vom Lehn	Germany	1:00.01	Q
13	8	7	Nic Fink	United States	1:00.05	Q
14	7	1	Richard Funk	Canada	1:00.26	Q
14	9	6	Felipe Lima	Brazil	1:00.26	Q
16	8	6	Čaba Silađi	Serbia	1:00.35	Q
17	8	8	Damir Dugonjič	Slovenia	1:00.36	
18	9	7	Glenn Snyders	New Zealand	1:00.44	
19	6	4	Anton Sveinn McKee	Iceland	1:00.53	
20	6	2	Vladislav Mustafin	Uzbekistan	1:00.63	
21	6	7	Jorge Murillo	Colombia	1:00.67	
22	8	3	Dániel Gyurta	Hungary	1:00.71	
23	9	8	Tomáš Klobučník	Slovakia	1:00.77	
24	8	1	Giacomo Perez d'Ortona	France	1:00.80	
25	8	0	Laurent Carnol	Luxembourg	1:00.82	
26	6	5	Yannick Käser	Switzerland	1:00.94	
27	7	2	Li Xiang	China	1:00.96	
28	8	4	Christian Sprenger	Australia	1:01.13	
29	8	2	Ryo Tateishi	Japan	1:01.26	
30	6	0	Matti Mattsson	Finland	1:01.44	
31	7	9	Carlos Claverie	Venezuela	1:01.63	
32	6	3	Erik Persson	Sweden	1:01.75	
33	8	9	Marcin Stolarski	Poland	1:01.98	
34	9	9	Martti Aljand	Estonia	1:01.99	
35	5	5	Youssef El-Kamash	Egypt	1:02.01	NR
36	6	1	Sandeep Sejwal	India	1:02.17	
37	7	8	Lorenzo Antonelli	Italy	1:02.20	
38	6	8	Alex Murphy	Ireland	1:02.22	
39	6	9	Demir Atasoy	Turkey	1:02.35	
40	5	2	Édgar Crespo	Panama	1:02.37	
41	5	4	Joshua Hall	Philippines	1:02.40	
42	5	6	Azad Al-Barazi	Syria	1:02.51	
43	7	0	Panagiotis Samilidis	Greece	1:02.58	
44	5	7	Renato Prono	Paraguay	1:02.69	
45	4	4	Wong Fu Kang	Malaysia	1:02.89	
46	6	6	Petr Bartůněk	Czech Republic	1:02.90	
47	5	8	Lachezar Shumkov	Bulgaria	1:03.08	
48	5	3	Nikolajs Maskaļenko	Latvia	1:03.21	
49	4	3	Chao Man Hou	Macau	1:03.46	
50	5	1	Dustin Tynes	Bahamas	1:03.50	
51	4	8	Jordy Groters	Aruba	1:03.66	
52	4	1	Julian Fletcher	Bermuda	1:03.80	
53	4	2	Benjamin Schulte	Guam	1:03.84	
54	5	9	Mauro Castillo	Mexico	1:03.91	
55	4	9	James Lawson	Zimbabwe	1:04.03	
56	4	6	Amini Fonua	Tonga	1:04.28	
57	4	5	Malick Fall	Senegal	1:04.30	
58	4	7	Anton Zheltyakov	Azerbaijan	1:04.45	
59	3	3	Arya Nasimi Shad	Iran	1:05.86	
60	3	4	Jesús Flores	Honduras	1:06.14	
61	3	6	Ramazan Taimatov	Kyrgyzstan	1:06.49	
62	4	0	Darren Chan	Mauritius	1:06.65	
63	3	0	Adriel Sanes	Virgin Islands	1:07.19	
64	3	5	Julian Harding	Malta	1:07.28	
65	3	7	Alexander Axiotis	Zambia	1:07.29	
66	3	8	Serginni Marten	Curaçao	1:07.34	
67	3	9	Nazih Nazeyek	Jordan	1:08.22	
68	3	2	José Alberto Quintanilla	Bolivia	1:08.36	
69	2	5	Corey Ollivierre	Grenada	1:08.39	
70	5	0	Mubarak Al-Besher	United Arab Emirates	1:09.08	
71	2	6	Kaito Yanai	Northern Mariana Islands	1:09.59	
72	2	2	Nikolas Sylvester	Saint Vincent and the Grenadines	1:13.12	
73	2	4	Daniel Gill	Seychelles	1:14.02	
74	1	4	Htut Ahnt Khaung	Myanmar	1:16.13	
75	2	1	Kiran Karki	Nepal	1:18.21	
76	2	8	Mocheta Makara	Lesotho	1:55.91	
	3	1	Markos Kalopsidiotis	Cyprus	DSQ	
	1	3	Alhassane Fofana	Guinea	DNS	
	1	5	Stephane Fokam	Cameroon	DNS	
	2	3	Alassane Seydou	Niger	DNS	
	2	7	Simanga Dlamini	Eswatini	DNS	

=== Semifinals ===
The semifinals were held on 2 August at 18:35.

==== Semifinal 1 ====
Rank	Lane	Name	Nationality	Time	Notes
1	4	Cameron van der Burgh	South Africa	58.49	Q, CR
2	6	Giedrius Titenis	Lithuania	58.96	Q, NR
3	3	Hendrik Feldwehr	Germany	59.63	Q
4	5	Ross Murdoch	Great Britain	59.75	Q
5	7	Christian vom Lehn	Germany	59.88	
6	2	Yasuhiro Koseki	Japan	1:00.31	
7	1	Richard Funk	Canada	1:00.43	
8	8	Čaba Silađi	Serbia	1:00.62	

==== Semifinal 2 ====
Rank	Lane	Name	Nationality	Time	Notes
1	4	Adam Peaty	Great Britain	58.18	Q, CR
2	5	Dmitriy Balandin	Kazakhstan	59.39	Q
3	6	Kirill Prigoda	Russia	59.60	Q, NR
4	2	Jake Packard	Australia	59.66	Q
5	7	Cody Miller	United States	59.86	
6	3	Felipe França Silva	Brazil	59.89	
7	1	Nic Fink	United States	1:00.14	
8	8	Felipe Lima	Brazil	1:00.19	

=== Final ===
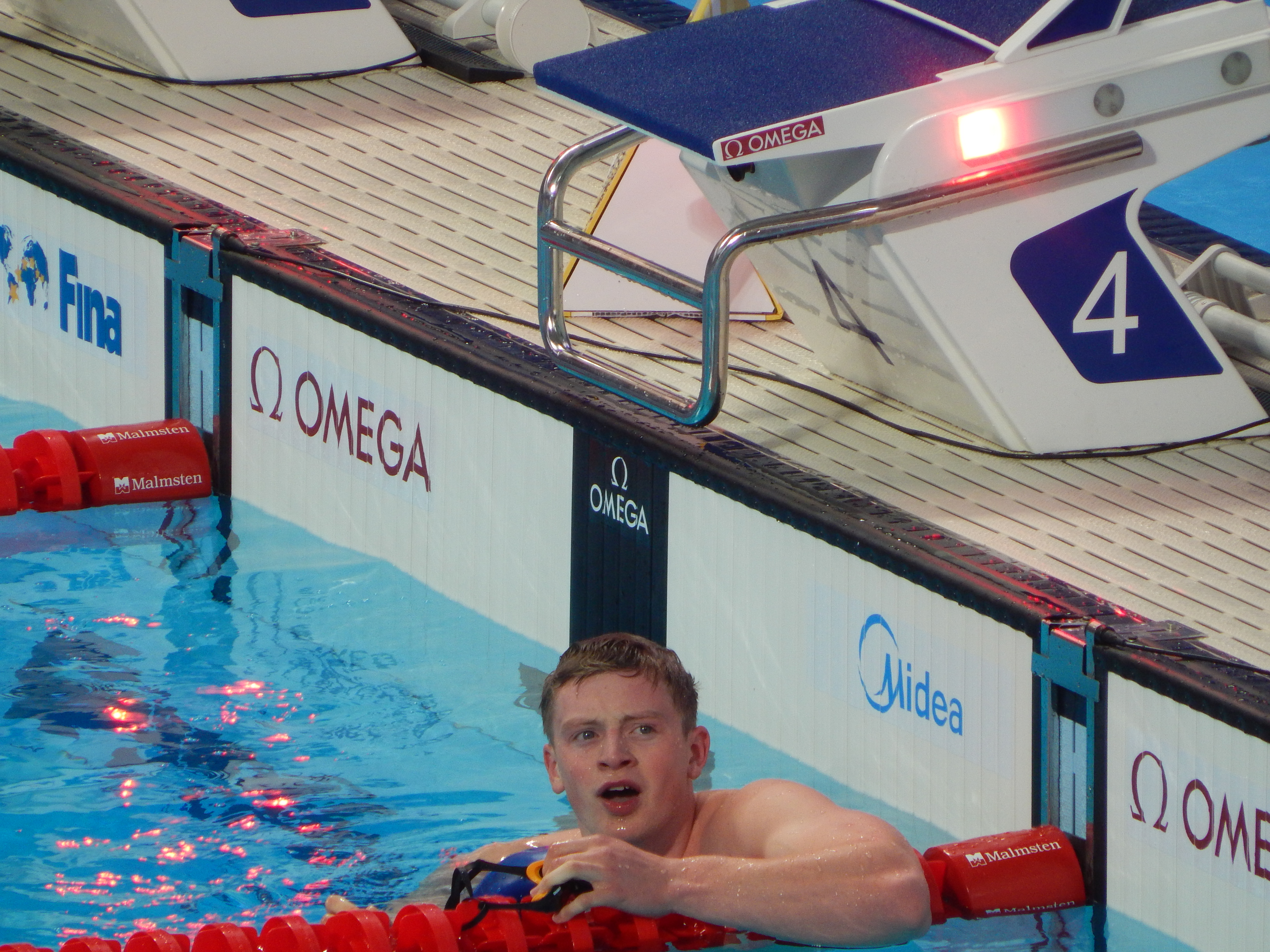
Adam Peaty after his win in final

The final was held on 3 August at 17:32.

Rank	Lane	Name	Nationality	Time	Notes
1st place, gold medalist(s)	4	Adam Peaty	Great Britain	58.52	
2nd place, silver medalist(s)	5	Cameron van der Burgh	South Africa	58.59	
3rd place, bronze medalist(s)	8	Ross Murdoch	Great Britain	59.09	
4	6	Dmitriy Balandin	Kazakhstan	59.42	
5	1	Jake Packard	Australia	59.44	
6	3	Giedrius Titenis	Lithuania	59.56	
7	2	Kirill Prigoda	Russia	59.84	
8	7	Hendrik Feldwehr	Germany	1:00.16	
