= Myanmar at the 2015 World Aquatics Championships =

- Flag of Myanmar
- FINA code: MYA
- National federation: Myanmar Swimming Federation

in Kazan, Russia
- Competitors: 3 in 1 sport
- Medals: Gold 0 Silver 0 Bronze 0 Total 0

World Aquatics Championships appearances
- 2001; 2003; 2005; 2007; 2009; 2011; 2013; 2015; 2017–2023; 2024

Myanmar competed at the 2015 World Aquatics Championships in Kazan, Russia from 24 July to 9 August 2015.

== Swimming ==
Burmese swimmers have achieved qualifying standards in the following events (up to a maximum of 2 swimmers in each event at the A-standard entry time, and 1 at the B-standard):

Men

Athlete	Event	Heat		Semifinal		Final	
Athlete	Event	Time	Rank	Time	Rank	Time	Rank
Htut Ahnt Khaung	100 m backstroke	1:12.90	67	did not advance			
Htut Ahnt Khaung	100 m breaststroke	1:16.13	74	did not advance			
Thint Myat	50 m butterfly	27.77	61	did not advance			
Thint Myat	100 m butterfly	1:02.78	69	did not advance			

Women

Athlete	Event	Heat		Semifinal		Final	
Athlete	Event	Time	Rank	Time	Rank	Time	Rank
San Su Moe Theint	50 m freestyle	27.98	70	did not advance			
San Su Moe Theint	50 m butterfly	29.21	46	did not advance			
