= Swimming at the 2015 World Aquatics Championships – Women's 100 metre butterfly =

Women's 100 metre butterfly at the 2015 World Aquatics Championships
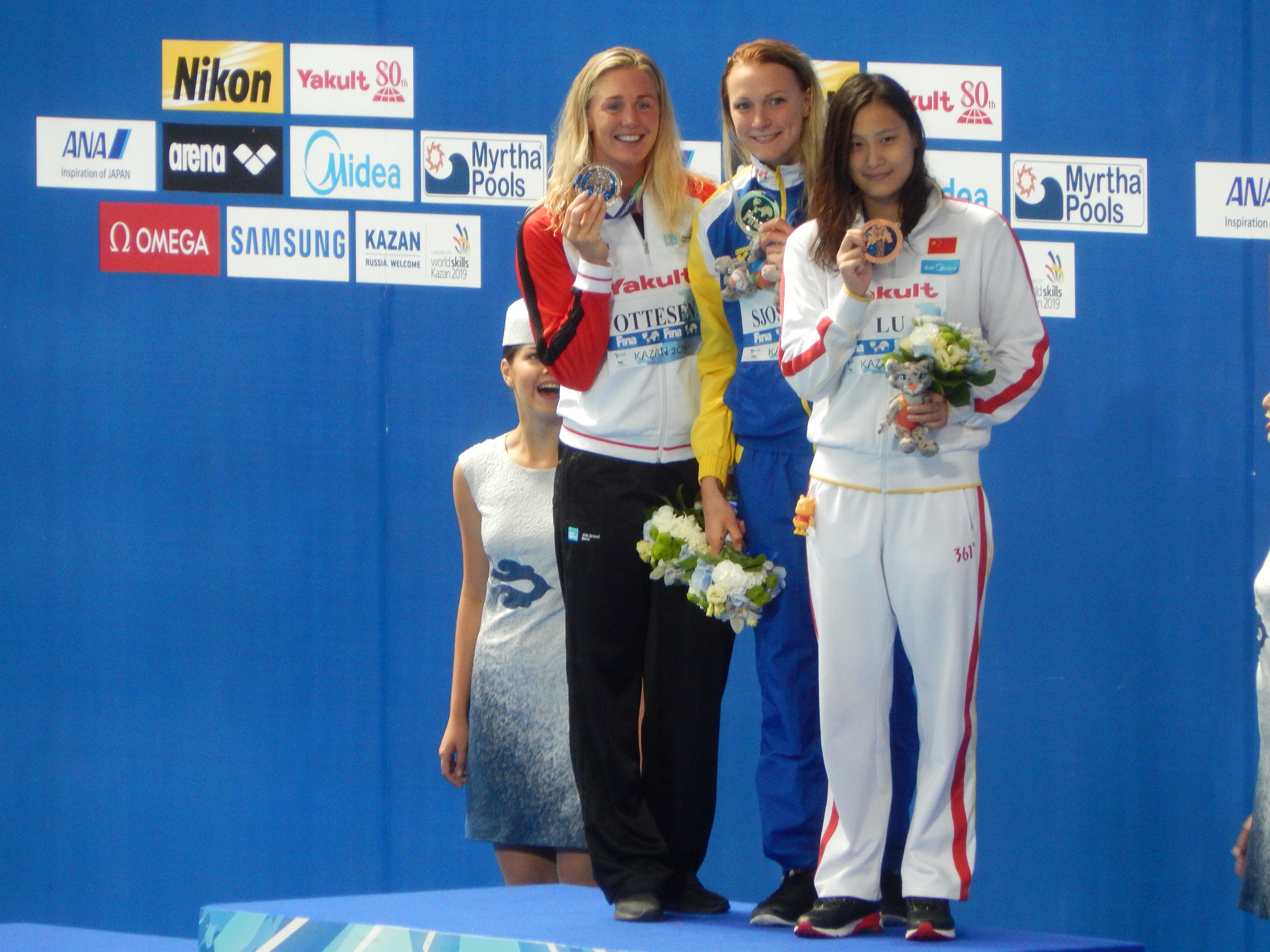
- Victory Ceremony
- Dates: 2 August (heats and semifinals); 3 August (final)
- Competitors: 69 from 57 nations
- Winning time: 55.64 WR

Medalists
gold medal	Sarah Sjöström	Sweden
silver medal	Jeanette Ottesen	Denmark
bronze medal	Lu Ying	China

The Women's 100 metre butterfly competition of the swimming events at the 2015 World Aquatics Championships was held on 2 August with the heats and the semifinals and 3 August with the final.

== Records ==
Prior to the competition, the existing world and championship records were as follows.

World record	Dana Vollmer (USA)	55.98	London, Great Britain	29 July 2012
Competition record	Sarah Sjöström (SWE)	56.06	Rome, Italy	27 July 2009

The following new records were set during this competition.

Date	Event	Name	Nationality	Time	Record
2 August	Semifinal 2	Sarah Sjöström	Sweden	55.74	WR
3 August	Final	Sarah Sjöström	Sweden	55.64	WR

== Results ==
=== Heats ===
The heats were held on 2 August at 09:30.

Rank	Heat	Lane	Name	Nationality	Time	Notes
1	7	4	Sarah Sjöström	Sweden	56.47	Q
2	6	4	Jeanette Ottesen	Denmark	57.79	Q
3	5	5	Inge Dekker	Netherlands	57.82	Q
4	7	2	Lu Ying	China	57.84	Q
5	5	4	Katerine Savard	Canada	57.96	Q
6	6	7	Alexandra Wenk	Germany	58.05	Q
7	5	6	Kendyl Stewart	United States	58.06	Q
8	7	5	Emma McKeon	Australia	58.12	Q
9	7	1	An Se-hyeon	South Korea	58.24	Q, NR
10	6	5	Madeline Groves	Australia	58.31	Q
11	6	6	Chen Xinyi	China	58.34	Q, =WJ
12	7	7	Noemie Thomas	Canada	58.35	Q
13	7	8	Kimberly Buys	Belgium	58.36	Q, NR
14	6	3	Ilaria Bianchi	Italy	58.37	Q
15	7	0	Natsumi Hoshi	Japan	58.47	Q
16	5	3	Rachael Kelly	Great Britain	58.48	QSO
16	6	9	Farida Osman	Egypt	58.48	QSO, NR
18	5	1	Daynara de Paula	Brazil	58.59	
19	5	2	Jemma Lowe	Great Britain	58.74	
20	6	2	Claire Donahue	United States	58.77	
21	6	1	Marie Wattel	France	58.84	
22	6	8	Katarína Listopadová	Slovakia	58.87	
23	4	5	Anna Ntountounaki	Greece	58.90	
24	7	9	Béryl Gastaldello	France	59.06	
25	5	8	Evelyn Verrasztó	Hungary	59.09	
26	5	7	Nataliya Lovtsova	Russia	59.11	
27	5	9	Danielle Villars	Switzerland	59.21	NR
28	5	0	Anna Polyakova	Russia	59.42	
29	4	8	Sze Hang Yu	Hong Kong	59.72	
30	4	4	Park Jin-young	South Korea	59.74	
31	6	0	Daiene Dias	Brazil	59.75	
32	7	6	Elena Di Liddo	Italy	59.78	
33	4	3	Judit Ignacio Sorribes	Spain	59.87	
34	4	7	Emilia Pikkarainen	Finland	1:00.16	
34	4	1	Lucie Svěcená	Czech Republic	1:00.16	
36	4	9	Quah Ting Wen	Singapore	1:00.30	
37	3	4	Jessica Camposano	Colombia	1:00.42	
38	3	5	Isabella Páez	Venezuela	1:00.58	NR
39	4	0	Nastja Govejšek	Slovenia	1:01.15	
40	3	7	Ana Monteiro	Portugal	1:01.53	
41	3	3	Marie Meza	Costa Rica	1:01.59	
42	3	2	Jasmine Al-Khaldi	Philippines	1:02.37	
43	3	6	Jóhanna Gústafsdóttir	Iceland	1:02.43	
44	3	8	Sotiria Neofytou	Cyprus	1:02.83	
45	4	6	Sharo Rodríguez	Mexico	1:02.97	
46	4	2	Laura Arroyo	Mexico	1:03.18	
47	2	7	Felicity Passon	Seychelles	1:03.29	
48	3	9	Amina Kajtaz	Bosnia and Herzegovina	1:03.39	
49	1	4	Noel Borshi	Albania	1:03.65	
50	3	1	Monalisa Lorenza	Indonesia	1:03.85	
51	3	0	Talita Baqlah	Jordan	1:04.23	
52	2	5	Jannah Sonnenschein	Mozambique	1:04.48	
53	2	4	Estefania Urzua	Chile	1:04.64	
54	2	2	Dalia Torrez Zamora	Nicaragua	1:04.75	
55	2	1	Emily Muteti	Kenya	1:04.91	
56	2	6	Caylee Watson	Virgin Islands	1:05.70	
57	2	3	Ana Nobrega	Angola	1:05.84	
58	2	8	Lara Butler	Cayman Islands	1:06.10	
59	2	9	Alsu Bayramova	Azerbaijan	1:06.79	
60	1	3	María Ribera	Bolivia	1:07.09	
61	1	6	Amarah Phillip	British Virgin Islands	1:08.60	
62	1	5	Tegan McCarthy	Papua New Guinea	1:08.82	
63	2	0	Choe Su-rim	North Korea	1:08.98	
64	1	1	Bo-Anne Bos	Curaçao	1:12.43	
65	1	2	Johanna Umurungi	Rwanda	1:13.14	
66	1	0	Dirngulbai Misech	Palau	1:14.05	
67	1	7	Nooran Ba Matraf	Yemen	1:14.43	
68	1	9	Charissa Panuve	Tonga	1:16.48	
69	1	8	Nada Arkaji	Qatar	1:17.30	
	7	3	Liliána Szilágyi	Hungary	DNS	

=== Swim-off ===
The swim-off was held at 11:56.

Rank	Lane	Name	Nationality	Time	Notes
1	4	Rachael Kelly	Great Britain	58.17	Q
2	5	Farida Osman	Egypt	58.22	NR

=== Semifinals ===
The semifinals were held on 2 August at 17:32.

==== Semifinal 1 ====
Rank	Lane	Name	Nationality	Time	Notes
1	4	Jeanette Ottesen	Denmark	57.04	Q
2	5	Lu Ying	China	57.36	Q
3	6	Emma McKeon	Australia	57.59	Q
4	3	Alexandra Wenk	Germany	57.77	Q, NR
5	7	Noemie Thomas	Canada	58.05	QSO
6	2	Madeline Groves	Australia	58.17	
7	8	Rachael Kelly	Great Britain	58.27	
8	1	Ilaria Bianchi	Italy	58.49	

==== Semifinal 2 ====
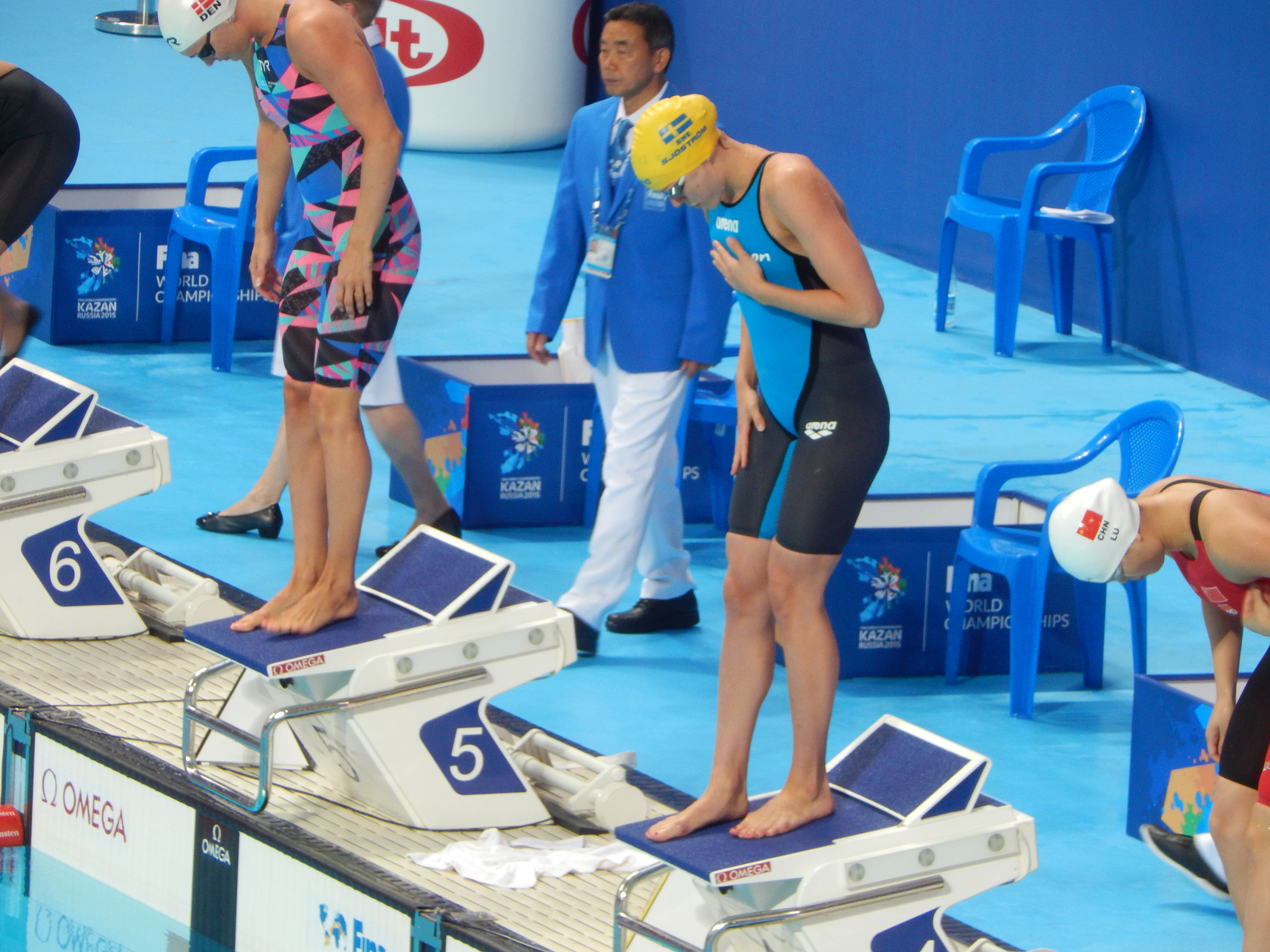
Sarah Sjöström

Rank	Lane	Name	Nationality	Time	Notes
1	4	Sarah Sjöström	Sweden	55.74	Q, WR
2	3	Katerine Savard	Canada	57.52	Q
3	7	Chen Xinyi	China	57.63	Q, WJ
4	5	Inge Dekker	Netherlands	58.05	QSO
5	6	Kendyl Stewart	United States	58.14	
6	2	An Se-hyeon	South Korea	58.44	
7	8	Natsumi Hoshi	Japan	58.45	
8	1	Kimberly Buys	Belgium	59.08	

=== Final ===
The final was held on 3 August at 17:40.

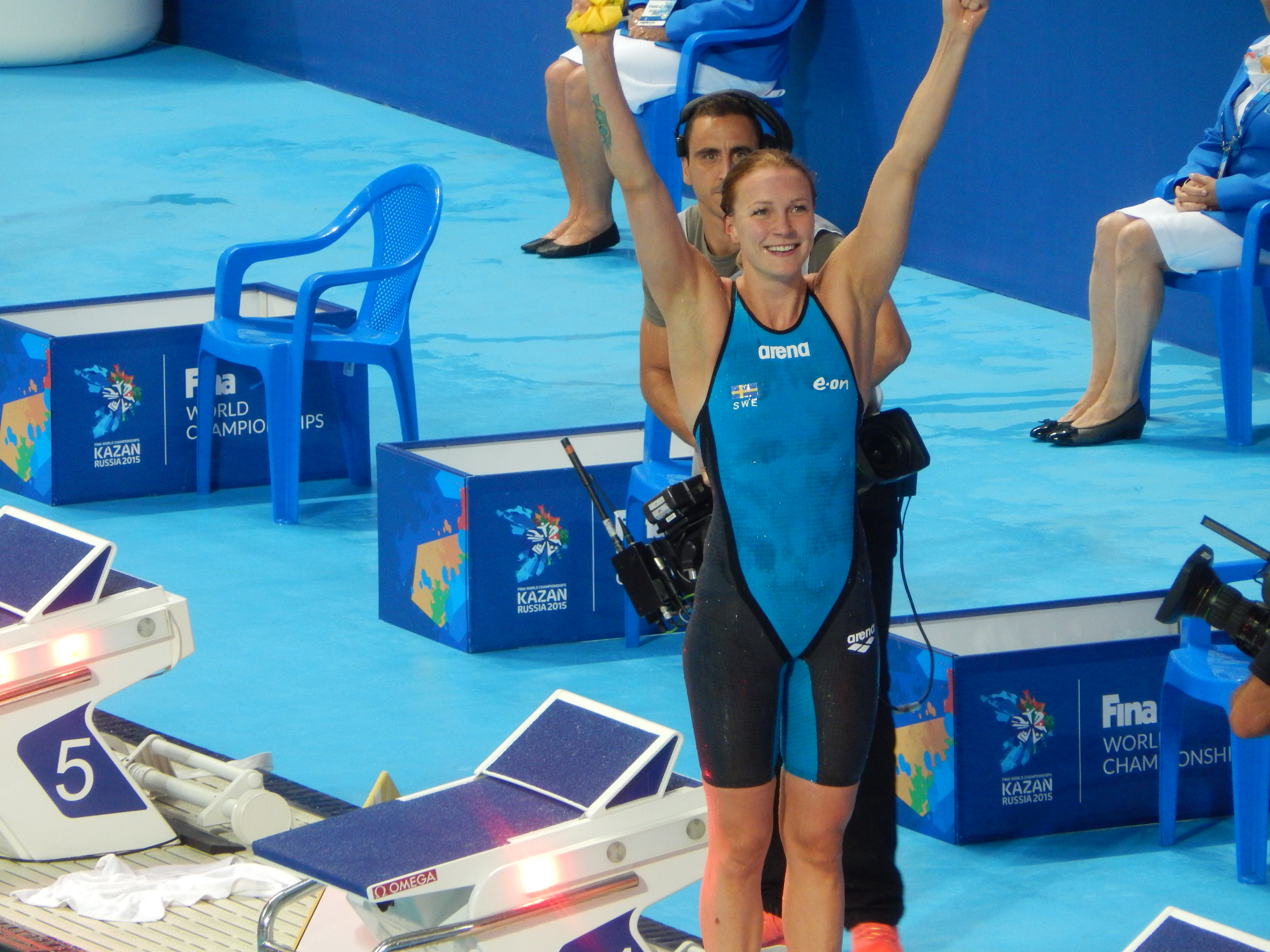
Sjöström wins gold with a world record

Rank	Lane	Name	Nationality	Time	Notes
1st place, gold medalist(s)	4	Sarah Sjöström	Sweden	55.64	WR
2nd place, silver medalist(s)	5	Jeanette Ottesen	Denmark	57.05	
3rd place, bronze medalist(s)	3	Lu Ying	China	57.48	
4	2	Emma McKeon	Australia	57.67	
5	6	Katerine Savard	Canada	57.69	
6	7	Chen Xinyi	China	57.85	
7	8	Noemie Thomas	Canada	57.94	
8	1	Alexandra Wenk	Germany	58.22	
