= British Virgin Islands at the 2015 World Aquatics Championships =

- Flag of the British Virgin Islands
- World Aquatics code: IVB
- National federation: British Virgin Islands Swimming Association

in Kazan, Russia
- Competitors: 2 in 1 sport
- Medals: Gold 0 Silver 0 Bronze 0 Total 0

World Aquatics Championships appearances
- 1973; 1975; 1978; 1982; 1986; 1991; 1994; 1998; 2001; 2003; 2005; 2007; 2009; 2011; 2013; 2015; 2017; 2019; 2022; 2023; 2024; 2025

The British Virgin Islands competed at the 2015 World Aquatics Championships held in Kazan, Russia from 24 July to 9 August 2015.

== Swimming ==
Swimmers from the British Virgin Islands have achieved qualifying standards in the following events (up to a maximum of 2 swimmers in each event at the A-standard entry time, and 1 at the B-standard):

Women

Athlete	Event	Heat		Semifinal		Final	
Athlete	Event	Time	Rank	Time	Rank	Time	Rank
Amarah Phillip	50 m freestyle	28.35	76	did not advance			
Amarah Phillip	100 m butterfly	1:08.60	61	did not advance			
Elinah Phillip	100 m freestyle	1:00.79	72	did not advance			
Elinah Phillip	50 m butterfly	29.29	48	did not advance			
