= Tajikistan at the 2025 World Aquatics Championships =

- Flag of Tajikistan
- World Aquatics code: TJK
- National federation: National Swimming Federation of the Republic of Tajikistan

in Singapore
- Competitors: 2 in 1 sport
- Medals: Gold 0 Silver 0 Bronze 0 Total 0

World Aquatics Championships appearances
- 1994; 1998; 2001; 2003; 2005; 2007; 2009; 2011; 2013; 2015; 2017; 2019; 2022; 2023; 2024; 2025

Other related appearances
- Soviet Union (1973–1991)

Tajikistan competed at the 2025 World Aquatics Championships in Singapore from July 11 to August 3, 2025.

== Competitors ==
The following is the list of competitors in the Championships.

Sport	Men	Women	Total
Swimming	2	0	2
Total	2	0	2

== Swimming ==
Tajikistan entered 2 swimmers.

Men

Athlete	Event	Heat		Semi-final		Final	
Athlete	Event	Time	Rank	Time	Rank	Time	Rank
Ardasher Gadoev	50 m freestyle	24.63	81	Did not advance			
Ardasher Gadoev	100 m freestyle	55.42	89	Did not advance			
Zakhar Pilkevich	50 m backstroke	31.52	57	Did not advance			
Zakhar Pilkevich	100 m backstroke	1:08.81	59	Did not advance			
