= Swimming at the 2017 World Aquatics Championships – Women's 50 metre freestyle =

Women's 50 metre freestyle at the 2017 World Aquatics Championships
- Venue: Danube Arena
- Location: Budapest, Hungary
- Dates: 29 July (heats and semifinals); 30 July (final)
- Competitors: 88 from 80 nations
- Winning time: 23.69

Medalists
| gold medal | Sarah Sjöström | Sweden |
| silver medal | Ranomi Kromowidjojo | Netherlands |
| bronze medal | Simone Manuel | United States |

The Women's 50 metre freestyle competition at the 2017 World Championships was held on 29 and 30 July 2017.

== Records ==
Prior to the competition, the existing world and championship records were as follows.

| World record | Britta Steffen (GER) | 23.73 | Rome, Italy | 2 August 2009 |
| Competition record | Britta Steffen (GER) | 23.73 | Rome, Italy | 2 August 2009 |

The following new records were set during this competition.

| Date | Event | Name | Nationality | Time | Record |
|---|---|---|---|---|---|
| 29 July | Semifinal | Sarah Sjöström | Sweden | 23.67 | WR, CR |

== Results ==
=== Heats ===
The heats were held on 29 July at 09:30.

| Rank | Heat | Lane | Name | Nationality | Time | Notes |
|---|---|---|---|---|---|---|
| 1 | 10 | 4 | Sarah Sjöström | Sweden | 24.08 | Q |
| 2 | 8 | 4 | Pernille Blume | Denmark | 24.32 | Q |
| 3 | 9 | 4 | Ranomi Kromowidjojo | Netherlands | 24.53 | Q |
| 4 | 10 | 5 | Simone Manuel | United States | 24.54 | Q |
| 5 | 8 | 5 | Bronte Campbell | Australia | 24.61 | Q |
| 6 | 9 | 2 | Michelle Toro | Canada | 24.64 | Q |
| 7 | 9 | 7 | Zhu Menghui | China | 24.65 | Q |
| 8 | 10 | 6 | Anna Santamans | France | 24.71 | Q |
| 9 | 8 | 7 | Farida Osman | Egypt | 24.78 | Q, AF |
| 9 | 10 | 2 | Liu Xiang | China | 24.78 | Q |
| 11 | 9 | 5 | Aliaksandra Herasimenia | Belarus | 24.82 | Q |
| 12 | 8 | 6 | Shayna Jack | Australia | 24.85 | Q |
| 13 | 10 | 3 | Abbey Weitzeil | United States | 24.92 | Q |
| 14 | 9 | 6 | Tamara van Vliet | Netherlands | 24.94 | Q |
| 15 | 8 | 1 | Sandrine Mainville | Canada | 24.99 | Q |
| 16 | 8 | 3 | Rikako Ikee | Japan | 25.04 | Q |
| 17 | 10 | 7 | Silvia di Pietro | Italy | 25.07 | |
| 18 | 10 | 1 | Yuliya Khitraya | Belarus | 25.10 | |
| 19 | 8 | 8 | Theodora Drakou | Greece | 25.22 | |
| 20 | 8 | 2 | Rozaliya Nasretdinova | Russia | 25.23 | |
| 21 | 9 | 3 | Etiene Medeiros | Brazil | 25.26 | |
| 22 | 10 | 0 | Susann Bjørnsen | Norway | 25.27 | |
| 23 | 9 | 0 | Michelle Coleman | Sweden | 25.36 | |
| 24 | 10 | 8 | Gabrielle Fa'amausili | New Zealand | 25.38 | |
| 25 | 7 | 8 | Mimosa Jallow | Finland | 25.44 | |
| 26 | 7 | 2 | Maria Ugolkova | Switzerland | 25.47 | |
| 27 | 7 | 5 | Anna Kolářová | Czech Republic | 25.56 | |
| 28 | 7 | 6 | Andrea Berrino | Argentina | 25.61 | NR |
| 28 | 9 | 1 | Flóra Molnár | Hungary | 25.61 | |
| 30 | 9 | 9 | Zohar Shikler | Israel | 25.65 | |
| 31 | 10 | 9 | Julie Meynen | Luxembourg | 25.67 | |
| 32 | 7 | 4 | Freya Anderson | Great Britain | 25.68 | |
| 33 | 7 | 3 | Isabella Arcila | Colombia | 25.70 | |
| 34 | 6 | 5 | Emma Chellius | South Africa | 25.73 | |
| 35 | 7 | 7 | Gabriela Ņikitina | Latvia | 25.78 | |
| 36 | 8 | 9 | Liliana Ibáñez | Mexico | 25.84 | |
| 37 | 7 | 9 | Rūta Meilutytė | Lithuania | 26.03 | |
| 38 | 6 | 6 | Karen Torrez | Bolivia | 26.16 | |
| 39 | 7 | 1 | Jeserik Pinto | Venezuela | 26.19 | |
| 40 | 6 | 3 | Sze Hang Yu | Hong Kong | 26.21 | |
| 41 | 7 | 0 | Ingibjörg Jónsdóttir | Iceland | 26.24 | |
| 42 | 6 | 7 | Kalia Antoniou | Cyprus | 26.31 | |
| 43 | 5 | 4 | Inés Remersaro | Uruguay | 26.59 | NR |
| 44 | 6 | 4 | Allyson Ponson | Aruba | 26.76 | |
| 45 | 6 | 2 | Elinah Phillip | British Virgin Islands | 26.85 | |
| 46 | 6 | 1 | Chade Nersicio | Curaçao | 26.91 | |
| 47 | 6 | 8 | Catharine Cooper | Panama | 26.99 | |
| 48 | 6 | 0 | Cheyenne Rova | Fiji | 27.05 | |
| 49 | 5 | 3 | Dara Al-Bakry | Jordan | 27.23 | |
| 50 | 5 | 5 | Lei On Kei | Macau | 27.37 | |
| 51 | 3 | 7 | Ani Poghosyan | Armenia | 27.46 | |
| 52 | 5 | 2 | Nikol Merizaj | Albania | 27.51 | NR |
| 52 | 5 | 6 | Jovana Terzić | Montenegro | 27.51 | |
| 54 | 6 | 9 | Alexus Laird | Seychelles | 27.65 | |
| 55 | 3 | 0 | Pak Mi-song | North Korea | 27.94 | |
| 56 | 3 | 6 | Naomy Grand'Pierre | Haiti | 28.06 | |
| 57 | 2 | 4 | Gabriela Hernandez | Nicaragua | 28.07 | |
| 58 | 3 | 3 | Catarina Sousa | Angola | 28.12 | |
| 59 | 5 | 7 | Jeanne Boutbien | Senegal | 28.25 | |
| 60 | 5 | 1 | Mikaili Charlemagne | Saint Lucia | 28.26 | |
| 61 | 5 | 8 | Colleen Furgeson | Marshall Islands | 28.32 | |
| 62 | 5 | 9 | Jamila Sanmoogan | Guyana | 28.45 | |
| 63 | 3 | 1 | Lea Ricart Martínez | Andorra | 28.61 | |
| 64 | 5 | 0 | Yesuin Bayar | Mongolia | 28.74 | |
| 65 | 2 | 1 | Hantan Raharvel | Madagascar | 28.84 | NR |
| 66 | 4 | 4 | Flaka Pruthi | Kosovo | 29.19 | NR |
| 67 | 4 | 3 | Angelika Ouedraogo | Burkina Faso | 29.38 | NR |
| 68 | 4 | 5 | Hemthon Vitiny | Cambodia | 29.69 | |
| 69 | 1 | 5 | Sofia Shah | Nepal | 29.73 | |
| 70 | 2 | 2 | Avice Meya | Uganda | 29.88 | |
| 71 | 3 | 8 | Gisela Cossa | Mozambique | 30.12 | NR |
| 72 | 1 | 3 | Aminath Shajan | Maldives | 30.50 | |
| 73 | 4 | 6 | Ammara Pinto | Malawi | 30.59 | |
| 74 | 1 | 4 | Mahfuza Khatun | Bangladesh | 30.73 | |
| 75 | 4 | 7 | Salie Al-Atrash | Palestine | 30.82 | |
| 76 | 4 | 1 | Anastasiya Tyurina | Tajikistan | 31.15 | NR |
| 77 | 3 | 9 | Ritaj Amin | Bahrain | 31.34 | |
| 78 | 4 | 8 | Siri Arun Budcharern | Laos | 31.86 | NR |
| 79 | 2 | 0 | Kestra Kihleng | Federated States of Micronesia | 32.10 | |
| 80 | 4 | 0 | Adzo Kpossi | Togo | 32.26 | NR |
| 81 | 2 | 8 | Nafissath Radji | Benin | 32.53 | NR |
| 82 | 2 | 3 | Imelda Ximenes Belo | Timor-Leste | 34.63 | |
| 83 | 3 | 4 | Chloe Sauvourel | Central African Republic | 35.04 | NR |
| 84 | 2 | 9 | Lena Irankunda | Burundi | 35.56 | |
| 85 | 4 | 9 | Roukaya Mahamane | Niger | 35.77 | |
| 86 | 2 | 6 | Safia Houssein Barkat | Djibouti | 39.59 | NR |
| 87 | 2 | 7 | Bunturabie Jalloh | Sierra Leone | 40.63 | |
| | 2 | 5 | Fatoumata Konate | Mali | DNS | |
| | 3 | 5 | Nazlati Mohamed Andhumdine | Comoros | DNS | |
| | 4 | 2 | Maayaa Ayawere | Ghana | DNS | |
| | 8 | 0 | Mélanie Henique | France | DNS | |
| | 9 | 8 | Aleksandra Urbańczyk | Poland | DSQ | |

=== Semifinals ===
The semifinals were held on 29 July at 18:28.

==== Semifinal 1 ====
| Rank | Lane | Name | Nationality | Time | Notes |
|---|---|---|---|---|---|
| 1 | 4 | Pernille Blume | Denmark | 24.05 | Q, NR |
| 2 | 5 | Simone Manuel | United States | 24.12 | Q |
| 3 | 6 | Anna Santamans | France | 24.54 | Q, NR |
| 4 | 2 | Liu Xiang | China | 24.56 | Q |
| 5 | 3 | Michelle Toro | Canada | 24.66 | |
| 6 | 7 | Shayna Jack | Australia | 24.69 | |
| 7 | 1 | Tamara van Vliet | Netherlands | 24.72 | |
| 8 | 8 | Rikako Ikee | Japan | 24.84 | |

==== Semifinal 2 ====
| Rank | Lane | Name | Nationality | Time | Notes |
|---|---|---|---|---|---|
| 1 | 4 | Sarah Sjöström | Sweden | 23.67 | Q, WR |
| 2 | 5 | Ranomi Kromowidjojo | Netherlands | 24.20 | Q |
| 3 | 3 | Bronte Campbell | Australia | 24.43 | Q |
| 4 | 7 | Aliaksandra Herasimenia | Belarus | 24.59 | Q |
| 5 | 2 | Farida Osman | Egypt | 24.62 | AF |
| 6 | 8 | Sandrine Mainville | Canada | 24.67 | |
| 7 | 6 | Zhu Menghui | China | 24.68 | |
| 8 | 1 | Abbey Weitzeil | United States | 24.80 | |

=== Final ===
The final was held on 30 July at 17:50.

| Rank | Lane | Name | Nationality | Time | Notes |
|---|---|---|---|---|---|
| 1st place, gold medalist(s) | 4 | Sarah Sjöström | Sweden | 23.69 | |
| 2nd place, silver medalist(s) | 6 | Ranomi Kromowidjojo | Netherlands | 23.85 | NR |
| 3rd place, bronze medalist(s) | 3 | Simone Manuel | United States | 23.97 | AM |
| 4 | 5 | Pernille Blume | Denmark | 24.00 | NR |
| 5 | 8 | Aliaksandra Herasimenia | Belarus | 24.46 | |
| 6 | 1 | Liu Xiang | China | 24.58 | |
| 6 | 7 | Anna Santamans | France | 24.58 | |
| 6 | 2 | Bronte Campbell | Australia | 24.58 | |
