= List of Tajikistani records in swimming =

The Tajikistani records in swimming are the fastest ever performances of swimmers from Tajikistan, which are recognised and ratified by the National Swimming Federation of the Republic of Tajikistan.

All records were set in finals unless noted otherwise.

== Long Course (50 m) ==
=== Men ===
Event	Time		Name	Club	Date	Meet	Location	Ref
50 m freestyle	25.43	h	Olimjon Ishanov	Tajikistan	21 August 2018	Asian Games	Jakarta, Indonesia	
100 m freestyle	58.36	h	Alijon Khairulloev	Tajikistan	24 July 2019	World Championships	Gwangju, South Korea	
200 m freestyle								
400 m freestyle								
800 m freestyle								
1500 m freestyle								
50m backstroke	31.87	h	Olimjon Ishanov	Tajikistan	20 August 2018	Asian Games	Jakarta, Indonesia	
100 m backstroke								
200 m backstroke								
50m breaststroke	35.52	h	Ramziyor Khorkashov	Tajikistan	25 July 2017	World Championships	Budapest, Hungary	
100m breaststroke	1:23.35	h	Yokubdzhon Umarov	Tajikistan	24 September 2014	Asian Games	Incheon, South Korea	
200 m breaststroke								
50m butterfly	28.67	h	Alijon Khairulloev	Tajikistan	23 August 2018	Asian Games	Jakarta, Indonesia	
100 m butterfly								
200 m butterfly								
200 m individual medley								
400 m individual medley								
4×100 m freestyle relay								
4×200 m freestyle relay								
4×100 m medley relay								

Legend: # – Record awaiting ratification by National Swimming Federation of the Republic of Tajikistan; WR – World record; AS – Asian record;
Records not set in finals: h – heat; sf – semifinal; r – relay 1st leg; rh – relay heat 1st leg; b – B final; † – en route to final mark; so – swim-off; tt – time trial

=== Women ===
Event	Time		Name	Club	Date	Meet	Location	Ref
50 m freestyle	28.85	h	Ekaterina Bordachyova	Tajikistan	3 August 2024	Olympic Games	Paris, France	
100 m freestyle	1:05.38	h	Ekaterina Bordachyova	Tajikistan	22 June 2022	World Championships	Budapest, Hungary	
200 m freestyle								
400 m freestyle								
800 m freestyle								
1500 m freestyle								
50 m backstroke	36.44	h	Ekaterina Bordachyova	Tajikistan	25 September 2023	Asian Games	Hangzhou, China	
100 m backstroke								
200 m backstroke								
50 m breaststroke	38.47	h	Karina Klimyk	Tajikistan	29 July 2017	World Championships	Budapest, Hungary	
100 m breaststroke								
200 m breaststroke								
50 m butterfly	30.65	h	Ekaterina Bordachyova	Tajikistan	16 February 2024	World Championships	Doha, Qatar	
100 m butterfly								
200 m butterfly								
200 m individual medley								
400 m individual medley								
4×100 m freestyle relay								
4×200 m freestyle relay								
4×100 m medley relay								

Legend: # – Record awaiting ratification by National Swimming Federation of the Republic of Tajikistan; WR – World record; AS – Asian record;
Records not set in finals: h – heat; sf – semifinal; r – relay 1st leg; rh – relay heat 1st leg; b – B final; † – en route to final mark; so – swim-off; tt – time trial

=== Mixed relay ===
Event	Time		Name	Club	Date	Meet	Location	Ref
4×100m freestyle relay	4:29.65	h	Olim Kurbanov (59.51); Ramziyor Khorkashov (1:05.14); Karina Klimyk (1:13.55); Anastasiya Tyurina (1:11.45)	Tajikistan	29 July 2017	World Championships	Budapest, Hungary	
4×100m medley relay								

Legend: # – Record awaiting ratification by National Swimming Federation of the Republic of Tajikistan; WR – World record; AS – Asian record;
Records not set in finals: h – heat; so – swim-off

== Short Course (25 m) ==
=== Men ===
Event	Time		Name	Club	Date	Meet	Location	Ref
50m freestyle	25.30	h	Olim Kurbanov	Tajikistan	22 September 2017	Asian Indoor and Martial Arts Games	Ashgabat, Turkmenistan	
100m freestyle	57.01	h	Olim Kurbanov	Tajikistan	25 September 2017	Asian Indoor and Martial Arts Games	Ashgabat, Turkmenistan	
200 m freestyle								
400 m freestyle								
800 m freestyle								
1500 m freestyle								
50m backstroke	30.37	h	Olim Kurbanov	Tajikistan	23 September 2017	Asian Indoor and Martial Arts Games	Ashgabat, Turkmenistan	
100 m backstroke								
200 m backstroke								
50m breaststroke	34.03	h	Ramziyor Khorkashov	Tajikistan	23 September 2017	Asian Indoor and Martial Arts Games	Ashgabat, Turkmenistan	
100 m breaststroke								
200 m breaststroke								
50m butterfly	27.73	h	Fakhriddin Madkamov	Tajikistan	14 December 2018	World Championships	Hangzhou, China	
100m butterfly	1:03.86	h	Fakhriddin Madkamov	Tajikistan	12 December 2018	World Championships	Hangzhou, China	
200 m butterfly								
100 m individual medley								
200 m individual medley								
400 m individual medley								
4×50 m freestyle relay								
4×100 m freestyle relay								
4×200 m freestyle relay								
4×50 m medley relay								
4×100 m medley relay								

Legend: # – Record awaiting ratification by National Swimming Federation of the Republic of Tajikistan; WR – World record; AS – Asian record;
Records not set in finals: h – heat; sf – semifinal; r – relay 1st leg; rh – relay heat 1st leg; b – B final; † – en route to final mark; so – swim-off; tt – time trial

=== Women ===
Event	Time		Name	Club	Date	Meet	Location	Ref
50 m freestyle	28.71	h	Ekaterina Bordachyova	Tajikistan	20 December 2021	World Championships	Abu Dhabi, United Arab Emirates	
100 m freestyle	1:03.93	h	Ekaterina Bordachyova	Tajikistan	17 December 2021	World Championships	Abu Dhabi, United Arab Emirates	
200 m freestyle								
400 m freestyle								
800 m freestyle								
1500 m freestyle								
50 m backstroke	44.36	h	Sabrina Ikromova	Tajikistan	19 December 2021	World Championships	Abu Dhabi, United Arab Emirates	
100 m backstroke								
200 m backstroke								
50 m breaststroke	38.13	h	Karina Klimyk	Tajikistan	25 September 2017	Asian Indoor and Martial Arts Games	Ashgabat, Turkmenistan	
100 m breaststroke								
200 m breaststroke								
50 m butterfly	33.45	h	Karina Klimyk	Tajikistan	13 December 2018	World Championships	Hangzhou, China	
100 m butterfly								
200 m butterfly								
100 m individual medley	1:16.73	h	Karina Klimyk	Tajikistan	25 September 2017	Asian Indoor and Martial Arts Games	Ashgabat, Turkmenistan	
200 m individual medley								
400 m individual medley								
4×50 m freestyle relay								
4×100 m freestyle relay								
4×200 m freestyle relay								
4×50 m medley relay								
4×100 m medley relay								

Legend: # – Record awaiting ratification by National Swimming Federation of the Republic of Tajikistan; WR – World record; AS – Asian record;
Records not set in finals: h – heat; sf – semifinal; r – relay 1st leg; rh – relay heat 1st leg; b – B final; † – en route to final mark; so – swim-off; tt – time trial

=== Mixed relay ===
Event	Time		Name	Club	Date	Meet	Location	Ref
4×50m freestyle relay	1:54.53	h	Olimjon Ishanov (25.85); Karina Klimyk (32.00); Fakhriddin Madkamov (27.29); Anastasiya Tyurina (29.39)	Tajikistan	12 December 2018	World Championships	Hangzhou, China	
4×50m medley relay	2:07.93	h	Olimjon Ishanov (30.66); Karina Klimyk (40.76); Fakhriddin Madkamov (27.71); Anastasiya Tyurina (28.80)	Tajikistan	13 December 2018	World Championships	Hangzhou, China	

Legend: # – Record awaiting ratification by National Swimming Federation of the Republic of Tajikistan;
Records not set in finals: h – heat; so – swim-off
