= Tajikistan at the 2015 World Aquatics Championships =

- Flag of Tajikistan
- FINA code: TJK
- National federation: Tajikistan Swimming Federation

in Kazan, Russia
- Competitors: 4 in 1 sport
- Medals: Gold 0 Silver 0 Bronze 0 Total 0

World Aquatics Championships appearances
- 1994; 1998; 2001; 2003; 2005; 2007; 2009; 2011; 2013; 2015; 2017; 2019; 2022; 2023; 2024

Other related appearances
- Soviet Union (1973–1991)

Tajikistan competed at the 2015 World Aquatics Championships in Kazan, Russia from 24 July to 9 August 2015.

== Swimming ==
Tajik swimmers have achieved qualifying standards in the following events (up to a maximum of 2 swimmers in each event at the A-standard entry time, and 1 at the B-standard):

Men

Athlete	Event	Heat		Semifinal		Final	
Athlete	Event	Time	Rank	Time	Rank	Time	Rank
Ramziyor Khorkashov	50 m backstroke	33.15	64	did not advance			
Ramziyor Khorkashov	50 m breaststroke	37.20	72	did not advance			
Olim Kurbanov	50 m freestyle	26.64	87	did not advance			
Olim Kurbanov	50 m butterfly	29.82	68	did not advance			

Women

Athlete	Event	Heat		Semifinal		Final	
Athlete	Event	Time	Rank	Time	Rank	Time	Rank
Karina Klimyk	100 m freestyle	1:09.71	89	did not advance			
Karina Klimyk	50 m breaststroke	40.17	63	did not advance			
Anastasiya Tyurina	50 m freestyle	DSQ		did not advance			
Anastasiya Tyurina	50 m backstroke	38.48	50	did not advance			

Mixed

Athlete	Event	Heat		Final	
Athlete	Event	Time	Rank	Time	Rank
Anastasiya Tyurina; Karina Klimyk; Olim Kurbanov; Ramziyor Khorkashov	4 × 100 m freestyle relay	DSQ		did not advance	
