= Swimming at the 2017 World Aquatics Championships – Women's 50 metre butterfly =

Women's 50 metre butterfly at the 2017 World Aquatics Championships
- Venue: Danube Arena
- Location: Budapest, Hungary
- Dates: 28 July (heats and semifinals); 29 July (final)
- Competitors: 63 from 55 nations
- Winning time: 24.60

Medalists
gold medal	Sarah Sjöström	Sweden
silver medal	Ranomi Kromowidjojo	Netherlands
bronze medal	Farida Osman	Egypt

The Women's 50 metre butterfly competition at the 2017 World Championships was held on 28 and 29 July 2017.

== Records ==
Prior to the competition, the existing world and championship records were as follows.

World record	Sarah Sjöström (SWE)	24.43	Borås, Sweden	5 July 2014
Competition record	Sarah Sjöström (SWE)	24.96	Kazan, Russia	8 August 2015

The following new records were set during this competition.

Date	Event	Name	Nationality	Time	Record
29 July	Final	Sarah Sjöström	Sweden	24.60	CR

== Results ==
=== Heats ===
The heats were held on 28 July at 09:56.

Rank	Heat	Lane	Name	Nationality	Time	Notes
1	7	4	Sarah Sjöström	Sweden	25.25	Q
2	7	5	Kelsi Worrell	United States	25.65	Q
3	6	4	Rikako Ikee	Japan	25.72	Q
4	7	2	Aliena Schmidtke	Germany	25.73	Q, NR
5	5	4	Ranomi Kromowidjojo	Netherlands	25.74	Q
5	7	1	Farida Osman	Egypt	25.74	Q, AF
7	6	2	Béryl Gastaldello	France	25.79	Q, NR
8	6	3	Mélanie Henique	France	25.81	Q
9	5	5	Kimberly Buys	Belgium	25.82	Q, NR
10	6	5	Penny Oleksiak	Canada	25.87	Q
11	5	6	Emilie Beckmann	Denmark	25.88	Q
12	7	6	Holly Barratt	Australia	25.91	Q
13	6	7	Aleksandra Urbańczyk	Poland	26.00	Q
14	7	3	Maaike de Waard	Netherlands	26.03	Q
15	5	2	Silvia di Pietro	Italy	26.24	Q
16	5	3	Lu Ying	China	26.34	Q
17	7	7	Zhang Yufei	China	26.40	
18	6	6	Svetlana Chimrova	Russia	26.49	
19	6	1	Flóra Molnár	Hungary	26.51	
20	7	8	Louise Hansson	Sweden	26.55	
21	6	0	Brittany Elmslie	Australia	26.61	
22	5	1	Nastja Govejšek	Slovenia	26.65	
22	6	9	Park Ye-rin	South Korea	26.65	
22	6	8	Sarah Gibson	United States	26.65	
25	5	7	Katerine Savard	Canada	26.81	
26	4	3	Amit Ivry	Israel	26.88	
27	4	6	Mimosa Jallow	Finland	26.89	
28	7	9	Lucie Svěcená	Czech Republic	26.90	
29	7	0	Anna Ntountounaki	Greece	26.94	
30	4	2	Gabriela Ņikitina	Latvia	26.95	NR
31	5	9	Bryndis Hansen	Iceland	27.15	
32	4	4	Barbora Mišendová	Slovakia	27.23	
33	4	1	Amina Kajtaz	Bosnia and Herzegovina	27.35	
34	4	8	Erin Gallagher	South Africa	27.36	
35	5	8	Helena Gasson	New Zealand	27.37	
36	4	7	Chan Kin Lok	Hong Kong	27.47	
37	3	4	Emily Muteti	Kenya	27.78	NR
38	4	0	Marie Laura Meza	Costa Rica	27.97	NR
39	3	5	Alexandra Schegoleva	Cyprus	28.22	
39	3	6	Talita Baqlah	Jordan	28.22	NR
41	4	9	Chade Nersicio	Curaçao	28.41	
42	2	0	María José Ribera	Bolivia	28.48	
43	3	3	Elinah Phillip	British Virgin Islands	28.51	
44	2	1	Nicole Rautemberg	Paraguay	29.13	
45	1	4	Jamila Sanmoogan	Guyana	30.02	NR
45	3	7	Ann-Marie Hepler	Marshall Islands	30.02	
47	3	2	Ana Sofia Nóbrega	Angola	30.18	
48	2	6	Mishael Aisha Ayub	Pakistan	30.77	
49	2	4	Hantan Raharvel	Madagascar	30.89	NR
50	3	8	Gabby Gittens	Antigua and Barbuda	31.77	
51	2	5	Hemthon Vitiny	Cambodia	32.39	NR
52	3	9	Faith Edorodion	Nigeria	32.61	
53	2	3	Avice Meya	Uganda	33.05	NR
54	1	3	Kestra Kihleng	Federated States of Micronesia	33.06	
55	3	0	Charissa Panuve	Tonga	33.43	
56	2	9	Karina Klimyk	Tajikistan	33.55	NR
57	2	7	Diana Basho	Albania	34.09	
58	2	2	Ritaj Amin	Bahrain	35.69	NR
59	2	8	Nafissath Radji	Benin	42.12	NR
	1	5	Fatou Bintou Diagne	Senegal	DNS	
	3	1	Gessica Stagno	Mozambique	DNS	
	4	5	Alys Thomas	Great Britain	DNS	
	5	0	Pernille Blume	Denmark	DNS	

=== Semifinals ===
The semifinals were held on 28 July at 18:46.

==== Semifinal 1 ====
Rank	Lane	Name	Nationality	Time	Notes
1	4	Kelsi Worrell	United States	25.57	Q
2	6	Mélanie Henique	France	25.63	Q, NR
3	2	Penny Oleksiak	Canada	25.66	Q, NR
4	5	Aliena Schmidtke	Germany	25.68	Q, NR
5	3	Farida Osman	Egypt	25.73	Q, AF
6	7	Holly Barratt	Australia	25.76	
7	8	Lu Ying	China	25.79	
8	1	Maaike de Waard	Netherlands	25.89	

==== Semifinal 2 ====
Rank	Lane	Name	Nationality	Time	Notes
1	4	Sarah Sjöström	Sweden	25.30	Q
2	3	Ranomi Kromowidjojo	Netherlands	25.67	Q
3	2	Kimberly Buys	Belgium	25.70	Q, NR
4	7	Emilie Beckmann	Denmark	25.77	
5	5	Rikako Ikee	Japan	25.90	
6	1	Aleksandra Urbańczyk	Poland	25.94	
7	6	Béryl Gastaldello	France	26.01	
8	8	Silvia di Pietro	Italy	26.06	

=== Final ===
The final was held on 29 July at 17:32.

Rank	Lane	Name	Nationality	Time	Notes
1st place, gold medalist(s)	4	Sarah Sjöström	Sweden	24.60	CR
2nd place, silver medalist(s)	2	Ranomi Kromowidjojo	Netherlands	25.38	
3rd place, bronze medalist(s)	8	Farida Osman	Egypt	25.39	AF
4	5	Kelsi Worrell	United States	25.48	AM
5	6	Penny Oleksiak	Canada	25.62	NR
6	3	Mélanie Henique	France	25.76	
7	1	Kimberly Buys	Belgium	25.78	
8	7	Aliena Schmidtke	Germany	26.08	
