= Swimming at the 2017 World Aquatics Championships – 4 × 100 metre mixed freestyle relay =

4 × 100 metre mixed freestyle relay at the 2017 World Aquatics Championships
- Venue: Danube Arena
- Location: Budapest, Hungary
- Dates: 29 July (heats and final)
- Competitors: 96 from 21 nations
- Teams: 21
- Winning time: 3:19.60

Medalists
gold medal	Caeleb Dressel; Nathan Adrian; Mallory Comerford; Simone Manuel; Blake Pieroni; Townley Haas; Lia Neal; Kelsi Worrell	United States
silver medal	Ben Schwietert; Kyle Stolk; Femke Heemskerk; Ranomi Kromowidjojo; Maud van der Meer	Netherlands
bronze medal	Yuri Kisil; Javier Acevedo; Chantal Van Landeghem; Penny Oleksiak; Markus Thormeyer; Sandrine Mainville	Canada

The 4 × 100 metre mixed freestyle relay competition at the 2017 World Championships was held on 29 July 2017.

== Records ==
Prior to the competition, the existing world and championship records were as follows.

World record	United States	3:23.05	Kazan, Russia	8 August 2015
Competition record	United States	3:23.05	Kazan, Russia	8 August 2015

The following new records were set during this competition

Date	Event	Nation	Time	Record
29 July	Final	United States	3:19.60	WR

== Results ==
=== Heats ===
The heats were held at 10:21.

Rank	Heat	Lane	Nation	Swimmers	Time	Notes
1	3	4	Netherlands	Ben Schwietert (48.97); Kyle Stolk (48.06); Femke Heemskerk (52.77); Maud van der Meer (54.09)	3:23.89	Q
2	1	6	United States	Blake Pieroni (48.23); Townley Haas (48.32); Lia Neal (53.98); Kelsi Worrell (53.40)	3:23.93	Q
3	3	7	Canada	Yuri Kisil (48.57); Markus Thormeyer (49.35); Sandrine Mainville (53.75); Chantal Van Landeghem (53.40)	3:25.07	Q
4	3	3	Hungary	Dominik Kozma (48.25); Nándor Németh (48.61); Zsuzsanna Jakabos (54.18); Evelyn Verrasztó (54.41)	3:25.45	Q, NR
5	2	4	Italy	Alessandro Miressi (48.51); Ivano Vendrame (48.54); Federica Pellegrini (53.80); Erika Ferraioli (54.86)	3:25.71	Q
6	2	7	Japan	Katsuhiro Matsumoto (49.42); Katsumi Nakamura (47.98); Tomomi Aoki (54.86); Chihiro Igarashi (54.65)	3:26.91	Q, AS
7	2	5	Russia	Nikita Korolev (49.27); Aleksandr Popkov (48.48); Viktoriya Andreyeva (54.63); Veronika Popova (54.56)	3:26.94	Q
8	3	0	Australia	Louis Townsend (49.42); Zac Incerti (49.03); Brianna Throssell (54.74); Madison Wilson (54.30)	3:27.49	Q
9	2	1	China	Lin Yongqing (49.26); Cao Jiwen (49.92); Wu Qingfeng (55.15); Sun Meichen (55.09)	3:29.42	
10	3	9	Denmark	Anders Lie (49.70); Daniel Skaaning (49.87); Signe Bro (54.79); Emilie Beckmann (55.77)	3:30.13	
11	1	3	Israel	Marcus Schlesinger (50.80); Liran Konovalov (50.27); Keren Siebner (56.14); Andrea Murez (53.95)	3:31.16	
12	2	6	South Africa	Douglas Erasmus (50.02); Zane Waddell (48.85); Erin Gallagher (55.26); Emma Chellius (57.25)	3:31.38	AF
13	1	2	Luxembourg	Julien Henx (50.22); Pit Brandenburger (51.02); Julie Meynen (55.93); Monique Olivier (57.73)	3:34.90	
14	1	4	Latvia	Uvis Kalniņš (50.50); Girts Feldberg (50.83); Gabriela Ņikitina (56.76); Kristina Steina (1:00.27)	3:38.36	
15	3	6	Jordan	Khader Baqlah (49.46); Mohammed Bedour (50.47); Talita Baqlah (1:00.69); Dara Al-Bakry (59.69)	3:40.31	
16	3	8	Macau	Chao Man Hou (52.33); Lin Sizhuang (52.45); Tan Chi Yan (59.37); Lei On Kei (59.34)	3:43.49	
17	3	1	Aruba	Mikel Schreuders (49.80); Jordy Groters (53.10); Allyson Ponson (59.87); Daniella van den Berg (1:01.17)	3:43.94	
18	1	7	Seychelles	Dean Hoffman (55.23); Alexus Laird (1:00.82); Adam Moncherry (57.93); Felicity Passon (58.29)	3:52.27	
19	2	9	Madagascar	Heriniavo Rasolonjatovo (54.29); Andrianirina Lalanomena (59.04); Elodie Marion Razafy (1:03.53); Hantan Raharvel (1:02.53)	3:59.39	
20	2	2	Tajikistan	Olim Kurbanov (59.51); Ramziyor Khorkashov (1:05.14); Karina Klimyk (1:13.55); Anastasiya Tyurina (1:11.45)	4:29.65	
21	3	2	Maldives	Ismail Muthasim Adnan (1:02.06); Aminath Shajan (1:12.51); Sajina Aishath (1:15.35); Mubal Azzam Ibrahim (1:01.32)	4:31.24	
	1	5	Slovakia	DNS		
	2	0	Faroe Islands	DNS		
	2	3	Egypt	DNS		
	2	8	Sri Lanka	DNS		
	3	5	France	DNS		

=== Final ===
The final was held at 19:17.

Rank	Lane	Nation	Swimmers	Time	Notes
1st place, gold medalist(s)	5	United States	Caeleb Dressel (47.22); Nathan Adrian (47.49); Mallory Comerford (52.71); Simone Manuel (52.18)	3:19.60	WR
2nd place, silver medalist(s)	4	Netherlands	Ben Schwietert (49.12); Kyle Stolk (47.80); Femke Heemskerk (52.33); Ranomi Kromowidjojo (52.56)	3:21.81	ER
3rd place, bronze medalist(s)	3	Canada	Yuri Kisil (48.51); Javier Acevedo (48.68); Chantal Van Landeghem (53.25); Penny Oleksiak (53.11)	3:23.55	NR
4	7	Japan	Katsuhiro Matsumoto (49.38); Katsumi Nakamura (47.76); Rikako Ikee (53.50); Chihiro Igarashi (54.14)	3:24.78	AS
5	2	Italy	Luca Dotto (48.71); Alessandro Miressi (48.27); Federica Pellegrini (53.49); Silvia Di Pietro (54.42)	3:24.89	
6	6	Hungary	Dominik Kozma (48.12); Richárd Bohus (48.54); Zsuzsanna Jakabos (53.60); Evelyn Verrasztó (54.76)	3:25.02	NR
7	1	Russia	Danila Izotov (48.59); Aleksandr Popkov (48.48); Viktoriya Andreyeva (54.66); Veronika Popova (53.76)	3:25.49	NR
8	8	Australia	Louis Townsend (49.24); Alexander Graham (48.36); Brittany Elmslie (53.93); Madison Wilson (53.98)	3:25.51	
