= Swimming at the 2015 World Aquatics Championships – Mixed 4 × 100 metre freestyle relay =

4 × 100 metre mixed freestyle relay at the 2015 World Aquatics Championships
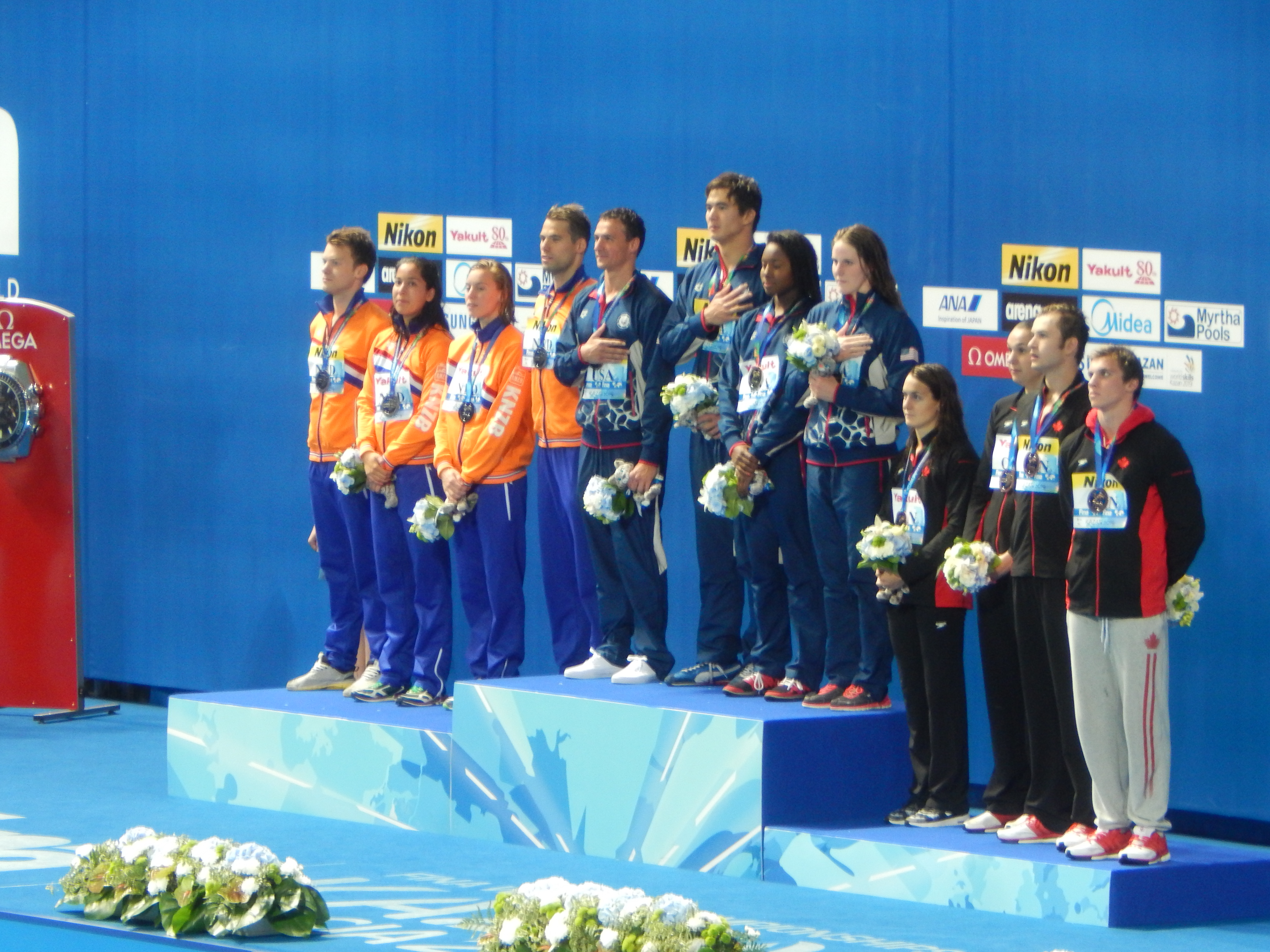
- Victory Ceremony
- Dates: 8 August (heats and final)
- Competitors: 123 from 28 nations
- Winning time: 3:23.05 WR

Medalists
gold medal	Ryan Lochte; Nathan Adrian; Simone Manuel; Missy Franklin; Conor Dwyer; Margo Geer; Abbey Weitzeil	United States
silver medal	Sebastiaan Verschuren; Joost Reijns; Ranomi Kromowidjojo; Femke Heemskerk; Kyle Stolk; Marrit Steenbergen	Netherlands
bronze medal	Santo Condorelli; Yuri Kisil; Sandrine Mainville; Chantal van Landeghem; Karl Krug; Victoria Poon	Canada

The 4 × 100 metre mixed freestyle relay competition of the swimming events at the 2015 World Aquatics Championships was held on 8 August with the heats and the final.

== Records ==
Prior to the competition, the existing world and championship records were as follows.

World record	Australia	3:23.29	Perth, Australia	01 February 2014
Competition record				

The following new records were set during this competition

Date	Event	Nation	Time	Record
8 August	Final	United States	3:23.05	WR

== Results ==
=== Heats ===
The heats were held at 10:24.

Rank	Heat	Lane	Nation	Swimmers	Time	Notes
1	3	3	United States	Conor Dwyer (49.47); Ryan Lochte (48.43); Margo Geer (53.12); Abbey Weitzeil (53.49)	3:24.51	Q, AM
2	4	4	Russia	Andrey Grechin (49.21); Nikita Lobintsev (47.97); Veronika Popova (54.00); Nataliya Lovtsova (54.05)	3:25.23	Q
3	3	5	Italy	Luca Dotto (49.30); Filippo Magnini (48.60); Federica Pellegrini (54.35); Erika Ferraioli (53.98)	3:26.23	Q
4	3	4	Sweden	Christoffer Carlsen (49.78); Simon Sjödin (49.70); Michelle Coleman (53.35); Louise Hansson (53.77)	3:26.60	Q, NR
5	3	0	Netherlands	Sebastiaan Verschuren (49.49); Kyle Stolk (49.44); Marrit Steenbergen (55.29); Femke Heemskerk (52.69)	3:26.91	Q, NR
6	2	7	China	Yu Hexin (49.82); Lin Yongqing (49.29); Qiu Yuhan (53.87); Tang Yuting (54.73)	3:27.71	Q
7	2	4	Canada	Yuri Kisil (49.36); Karl Krug (49.20); Sandrine Mainville (54.22); Victoria Poon (54.97)	3:27.75	Q
7	2	5	Brazil	Matheus Santana (49.82); Marcelo Chierighini (48.43); Larissa Oliveira (54.89); Daynara de Paula (54.61)	3:27.75	Q, SA
9	4	2	France	Lorys Bourelly (49.94); Clément Mignon (48.20); Cloé Hache (55.33); Margaux Fabre (54.82)	3:28.29	
10	2	1	Japan	Yuki Kobori (49.69); Naito Ehara (49.90); Rikako Ikee (54.31); Misaki Yamaguchi (54.64)	3:28.54	
11	3	8	Germany	Christoph Fildebrandt (49.08); Marco di Carli (48.93); Alexandra Wenk (55.03); Marlene Hüther (55.95)	3:28.99	NR
12	3	2	Turkey	Doğa Çelik (50.30); Kemal Arda Gürdal (49.23); Ekaterina Avramova (56.21); Gizem Bozkurt (57.37)	3:33.11	
13	4	7	Singapore	Yeo Kai Quan (51.43); Amanda Lim (57.68); Quah Ting Wen (56.08); Quah Zheng Wen (49.39)	3:34.58	
14	1	5	Switzerland	Lukas Räuftlin (51.25); Jean-Baptiste Febo (50.76); Noemi Girardet (56.70); Maria Ugolkova (56.01)	3:34.72	
15	4	1	Luxembourg	Julien Henx (50.99); Pit Brandenburger (50.85); Julie Meynen (55.51); Monique Olivier (57.84)	3:35.19	
16	2	2	Serbia	Andrej Barna (51.21); Uroš Nikolić (50.24); Miroslava Najdanovski (57.98); Anja Crevar (59.23)	3:38.66	
17	4	6	FINA Independent Athletes	Matthew Abeysinghe (51.47); Machiko Raheem (59.94); Cherantha de Silva (52.60); Kimiko Raheem (58.93)	3:42.94	
18	4	8	Dominican Republic	Jhonny Pérez (52.85); Arianna Sanna (59.04); Dorian McMenemy (58.98); Jean Luis Gómez (52.98)	3:43.85	
19	1	4	Costa Rica	Marie Meza (59.09); Esteban Araya (54.55); Helena Moreno (1:00.10); Mario Montoya (52.42)	3:46.16	
20	4	5	Bolivia	Andrew Rutherfurd (52.37 NR); Maria José Ribera (1:01.73); Karen Torrez (57.96); Aldo Castillo (54.40)	3:46.46	
21	2	6	Jordan	Khader Baqlah (51.81); Mohammed Bedour (53.73); Rahaf Baqleh (1:02.21); Talita Baqlah (59.59)	3:47.34	
22	2	8	Mozambique	Denílson da Costa (55.03); Jannah Sonnenschein (1:00.94); Jessika Cossa (59.86); Igor Mogne (51.77)	3:47.60	
23	4	3	Macau	Chao Man Hou (52.92); Long Chi Wai (1:01.63); Ngou Pok Man (53.28); Lei On Kei (1:00.97)	3:48.80	
24	2	3	Kenya	Emily Muteti (1:01.03); Hamdan Bayusuf (56.38); Talisa Lanoe (1:01.96); Issa Mohamed (53.49)	3:52.86	
25	3	6	Armenia	Vahan Mkhitaryan (53.85); Monika Vasilyan (1:03.33); Ani Poghosyan (1:01.29); Vladimir Mamikonyan (54.49)	3:52.96	
26	3	9	Mongolia	Yesui Bayar (1:11.46); Batsaikhan Dulguun (55.65); Enkhkhuslen Batbayar (1:05.69); Delgerkhuu Myagmar (56.05)	4:08.85	
	2	0	Tajikistan	Anastasiya Tyurina (59.88); Karina Klimyk (1:05.82); Olim Kurbanov (1:11.96); Ramziyor Khorkashov (DSQ)		DSQ
	4	0	Papua New Guinea	Ryan Pini (50.86); Tegan McCarthy (1:06.05); Barbara Vali-Skelton (1:04.02); Sam Seghers (DSQ)		DSQ
	1	3	Albania			DNS
	3	1	Australia			DNS
	3	7	Mexico			DNS

=== Final ===
The final was held on 8 August at 19:17.

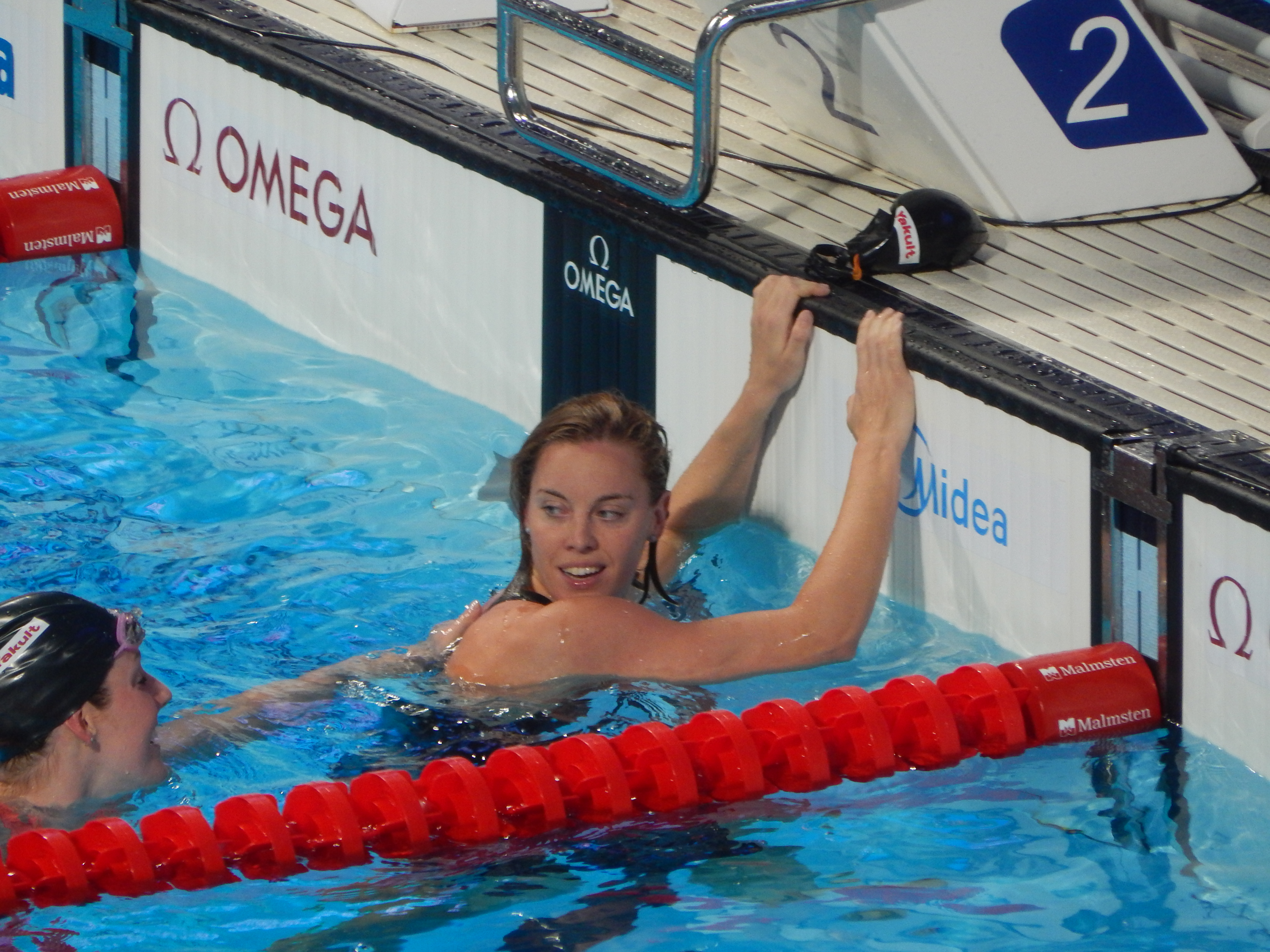
Missy Franklin (left) and Femke Heemskerk after finishing first and second

Rank	Lane	Nation	Swimmers	Time	Notes
1st place, gold medalist(s)	4	United States	Ryan Lochte (48.79); Nathan Adrian (47.29); Simone Manuel (53.66); Missy Franklin (53.31)	3:23.05	WR
2nd place, silver medalist(s)	2	Netherlands	Sebastiaan Verschuren (48.74); Joost Reijns (49.09); Ranomi Kromowidjojo (52.48); Femke Heemskerk (52.79)	3:23.10	EU
3rd place, bronze medalist(s)	1	Canada	Santo Condorelli (48.19); Yuri Kisil (48.25); Chantal van Landeghem (53.60); Sandrine Mainville (53.55)	3:23.59	
4	5	Russia	Vladimir Morozov (48.27); Alexandr Sukhorukov (47.74); Veronika Popova (53.72); Nataliya Lovtsova (54.48)	3:24.21	
5	3	Italy	Marco Orsi (48.70); Filippo Magnini (48.19); Federica Pellegrini (54.26); Erika Ferraioli (54.11)	3:25.26	
6	8	Brazil	Matheus Santana (48.96); Bruno Fratus (47.83); Larissa Oliveira (54.15); Daynara de Paula (54.64)	3:25.58	SA
7	7	China	Yu Hexin (49.70); Lin Yongqing (49.06); Qiu Yuhan (53.83); Tang Yuting (54.35)	3:26.94	AS
8	6	Sweden	Christoffer Carlsen (50.03); Simon Sjödin (49.67); Michelle Coleman (53.41); Louise Hansson (53.98)	3:27.09	
