= Tajikistan at the 2017 World Aquatics Championships =

- Flag of Tajikistan
- FINA code: TJK
- National federation: Tajikistan Swimming Federation

in Budapest, Hungary
- Competitors: 4 in 1 sport
- Medals: Gold 0 Silver 0 Bronze 0 Total 0

World Aquatics Championships appearances
- 1994; 1998; 2001; 2003; 2005; 2007; 2009; 2011; 2013; 2015; 2017; 2019; 2022; 2023; 2024

Other related appearances
- Soviet Union (1973–1991)

Tajikistan competed at the 2017 World Aquatics Championships in Budapest, Hungary from 14 July to 30 July.

== Swimming ==
Tajikistan has received a Universality invitation from FINA to send a maximum of four swimmers (two men and two women) to the World Championships.

Athlete	Event	Heat		Semifinal		Final	
Athlete	Event	Time	Rank	Time	Rank	Time	Rank
Ramziyor Khorkashov	Men's 50 m backstroke	33.89	53	did not advance			
Ramziyor Khorkashov	Men's 50 m breaststroke	35.52	76	did not advance			
Olim Kurbanov	Men's 50 m freestyle	25.70	100	did not advance			
Olim Kurbanov	Men's 100 m freestyle	58.56	103	did not advance			
Karina Klimyk	Women's 50 m breaststroke	38.47	45	did not advance			
Karina Klimyk	Women's 50 m butterfly	33.55	56	did not advance			
Anastasiya Tyurina	Women's 50 m freestyle	31.15	76	did not advance			
Anastasiya Tyurina	Women's 100 m freestyle	1:09.14	73	did not advance			
Ramziyor Khorkashov; Olim Kurbanov; Karina Klimyk; Anastasiya Tyurina	Mixed 4 × 100 m freestyle relay	4:29.65	20	—		did not advance	
