= Swimming at the 2017 World Aquatics Championships =

- Host city: Budapest, Hungary
- Date: 23–30 July
- Venue: Danube Arena
- Events: 42

Swimming at the 2017 World Aquatics Championships was held from 23 to 30 July 2017 in Budapest, Hungary. It was held in the Danube Arena. The United States was the top winner in the overall championship with 21 gold medals and 46 points in total with China second with 12 gold medals with 30 points in total. In the swimming events also, the United States was first and gained 18 gold medals and scored 38 points.

== Schedule ==
42 events were held.

All times are local (UTC+2).

H	Heats	½	Semi finals	F	Final

M = Morning session (starting at 09:30), E = Evening session (starting at 17:30)

Men
Date →	Sun 23		Mon 24		Tue 25		Wed 26		Thu 27		Fri 28		Sat 29		Sun 30	
Event ↓	M	E	M	E	M	E	M	E	M	E	M	E	M	E	M	E
50 m freestyle											H	½		F		
100 m freestyle							H	½		F						
200 m freestyle			H	½		F										
400 m freestyle	H	F														
800 m freestyle					H			F								
1500 m freestyle													H			F
50 m backstroke													H	½		F
100 m backstroke			H	½		F										
200 m backstroke									H	½		F				
50 m breaststroke					H	½		F								
100 m breaststroke	H	½		F												
200 m breaststroke									H	½		F				
50 m butterfly	H	½		F												
100 m butterfly											H	½		F		
200 m butterfly					H	½		F								
200 m individual medley							H	½		F						
400 m individual medley															H	F
4 × 100 m freestyle relay	H	F														
4 × 200 m freestyle relay											H	F				
4 × 100 m medley relay															H	F

Women
Date →	Sun 23		Mon 24		Tue 25		Wed 26		Thu 27		Fri 28		Sat 29		Sun 30	
Event ↓	M	E	M	E	M	E	M	E	M	E	M	E	M	E	M	E
50 m freestyle													H	½		F
100 m freestyle									H	½		F				
200 m freestyle					H	½		F								
400 m freestyle	H	F														
800 m freestyle											H			F		
1500 m freestyle			H			F										
50 m backstroke							H	½		F						
100 m backstroke			H	½		F										
200 m backstroke											H	½		F		
50 m breaststroke													H	½		F
100 m breaststroke			H	½		F										
200 m breaststroke									H	½		F				
50 m butterfly											H	½		F		
100 m butterfly	H	½		F												
200 m butterfly							H	½		F						
200 m individual medley	H	½		F												
400 m individual medley															H	F
4 × 100 m freestyle relay	H	F														
4 × 200 m freestyle relay									H	F						
4 × 100 m medley relay															H	F

Mixed
Date →	Sun 23		Mon 24		Tue 25		Wed 26		Thu 27		Fri 28		Sat 29		Sun 30	
Event ↓	M	E	M	E	M	E	M	E	M	E	M	E	M	E	M	E
4 × 100 m freestyle relay													H	F		
4 × 100 m medley relay							H	F								

== Medal summary ==
=== Medal table ===
* Host nation

Rank	Nation	Gold	Silver	Bronze	Total
1	United States	18	10	10	38
2	Great Britain	4	1	2	7
3	China	3	3	4	10
3	Russia	3	3	4	10
5	Sweden	3	1	0	4
6	Italy	3	0	3	6
7	Hungary*	2	4	2	8
8	Australia	1	5	4	10
9	Brazil	1	4	0	5
10	Spain	1	2	0	3
11	Canada	1	0	3	4
12	France	1	0	1	2
12	South Africa	1	0	1	2
14	Japan	0	4	3	7
15	Netherlands	0	3	1	4
16	Ukraine	0	1	1	2
17	Germany	0	1	0	1
17	Poland	0	1	0	1
19	Belarus	0	0	1	1
19	Denmark	0	0	1	1
19	Egypt	0	0	1	1
19	Singapore	0	0	1	1
Totals (22 entries)		42	43	43	128

=== Men ===
Event	Gold		Silver		Bronze	
50 m freestyle	Caeleb Dressel; United States	21.15; NR	Bruno Fratus; Brazil	21.27	Ben Proud; Great Britain	21.43
100 m freestyle	Caeleb Dressel; United States	47.17; NR	Nathan Adrian; United States	47.87	Mehdy Metella; France	47.89
200 m freestyle	Sun Yang; China	1:44.39; AS	Townley Haas; United States	1:45.04	Aleksandr Krasnykh; Russia	1:45.23
400 m freestyle	Sun Yang; China	3:41.38	Mack Horton; Australia	3:43.85	Gabriele Detti; Italy	3:43.93
800 m freestyle	Gabriele Detti; Italy	7:40.77; ER	Wojciech Wojdak; Poland	7:41.73; NR	Gregorio Paltrinieri; Italy	7:42.44
1500 m freestyle	Gregorio Paltrinieri; Italy	14:35.85	Mykhailo Romanchuk; Ukraine	14:37.14; NR	Mack Horton; Australia	14:47.70
50 m backstroke	Camille Lacourt; France	24.35	Junya Koga; Japan	24.51	Matt Grevers; United States	24.56
100 m backstroke	Xu Jiayu; China	52.44	Matt Grevers; United States	52.48	Ryan Murphy; United States	52.59
200 m backstroke	Evgeny Rylov; Russia	1:53.61; ER	Ryan Murphy; United States	1:54.21	Jacob Pebley; United States	1:55.06
50 m breaststroke	Adam Peaty; Great Britain	25.99	João Gomes Júnior; Brazil	26.52; AM	Cameron van der Burgh; South Africa	26.60
100 m breaststroke	Adam Peaty; Great Britain	57.47; CR	Kevin Cordes; United States	58.79	Kirill Prigoda; Russia	59.05; NR
200 m breaststroke	Anton Chupkov; Russia	2:06.96; CR, ER	Yasuhiro Koseki; Japan	2:07.29	Ippei Watanabe; Japan	2:07.47
50 m butterfly	Ben Proud; Great Britain	22.75; NR	Nicholas Santos; Brazil	22.79	Andriy Govorov; Ukraine	22.84
100 m butterfly	Caeleb Dressel; United States	49.86	Kristóf Milák; Hungary	50.62; WJ, NR	Joseph Schooling; Singapore James Guy; Great Britain	50.83
200 m butterfly	Chad le Clos; South Africa	1:53.33	László Cseh; Hungary	1:53.72	Daiya Seto; Japan	1:54.21
200 m individual medley	Chase Kalisz; United States	1:55.56	Kosuke Hagino; Japan	1:56.01	Wang Shun; China	1:56.28
400 m individual medley	Chase Kalisz; United States	4:05.90; CR	Dávid Verrasztó; Hungary	4:08.38	Daiya Seto; Japan	4:09.14
4 × 100 m freestyle relay	United States; Caeleb Dressel (47.26) NR; Townley Haas (47.46); Blake Pieroni (48.09); Nathan Adrian (47.25); Zach Apple^{[a]} Michael Chadwick^{[a]}	3:10.06	Brazil; Gabriel Santos (48.30); Marcelo Chierighini (46.85); César Cielo (48.01); Bruno Fratus (47.18)	3:10.34; SA	Hungary; Dominik Kozma (48.26) NR; Nándor Németh (48.04); Péter Holoda (48.48); Richárd Bohus (47.21)	3:11.99; NR
4 × 200 m freestyle relay	Great Britain; Stephen Milne (1:47.25); Nicholas Grainger (1:46.05); Duncan Scott (1:44.60); James Guy (1:43.80); Calum Jarvis^{[a]}	7:01.70; NR	Russia; Mikhail Dovgalyuk (1:46.00); Mikhail Vekovishchev (1:45.91); Danila Izotov (1:45.97); Aleksandr Krasnykh (1:44.80); Nikita Lobintsev^{[a]}	7:02.68	United States; Blake Pieroni (1:46.33); Townley Haas (1:44.58); Jack Conger (1:45.37); Zane Grothe (1:46.90); Conor Dwyer^{[a]} Clark Smith^{[a]} Jay Litherland^{[a]}	7:03.18
4 × 100 m medley relay	United States; Matt Grevers (52.26); Kevin Cordes (58.89); Caeleb Dressel (49.76); Nathan Adrian (47.00); Ryan Murphy^{[a]} Cody Miller^{[a]} Tim Phillips^{[a]} Townley Haas^{[a]}	3:27.91	Great Britain; Chris Walker-Hebborn (54.20); Adam Peaty (56.91); James Guy (50.80); Duncan Scott (47.04); Ross Murdoch^{[a]}	3:28.95; NR	Russia; Evgeny Rylov (52.89); Kirill Prigoda (59.02); Aleksandr Popkov (51.16); Vladimir Morozov (46.69); Grigory Tarasevich^{[a]} Anton Chupkov^{[a]} Daniil Pakhomov^{[a]} Danila Izotov^{[a]}	3:29.76; NR
AF African record | AM Americas record | AS Asian record | CR Championship record | ER European record | OC Oceania record | WR World record | NR National record

^{a} Swimmers who participated in the heats only and received medals.

=== Women ===
Event	Gold		Silver		Bronze	
50 m freestyle	Sarah Sjöström; Sweden	23.69	Ranomi Kromowidjojo; Netherlands	23.85; NR	Simone Manuel; United States	23.97; AM
100 m freestyle	Simone Manuel; United States	52.27; AM	Sarah Sjöström; Sweden	52.31	Pernille Blume; Denmark	52.69; NR
200 m freestyle	Federica Pellegrini; Italy	1:54.73	Katie Ledecky; United States Emma McKeon; Australia	1:55.18	None awarded	
400 m freestyle	Katie Ledecky; United States	3:58.34; CR	Leah Smith; United States	4:01.54	Li Bingjie; China	4:03.25
800 m freestyle	Katie Ledecky; United States	8:12.68	Li Bingjie; China	8:15.46; AS	Leah Smith; United States	8:17.22
1500 m freestyle	Katie Ledecky; United States	15:31.82	Mireia Belmonte; Spain	15:50.89; NR	Simona Quadarella; Italy	15:53.86
50 m backstroke	Etiene Medeiros; Brazil	27.14; AM	Fu Yuanhui; China	27.15	Aliaksandra Herasimenia; Belarus	27.23 =ER
100 m backstroke	Kylie Masse; Canada	58.10; WR	Kathleen Baker; United States	58.58	Emily Seebohm; Australia	58.59
200 m backstroke	Emily Seebohm; Australia	2:05.68; OC	Katinka Hosszú; Hungary	2:05.85; NR	Kathleen Baker; United States	2:06.48
50 m breaststroke	Lilly King; United States	29.40; WR	Yuliya Yefimova; Russia	29.57	Katie Meili; United States	29.99
100 m breaststroke	Lilly King; United States	1:04.13; WR	Katie Meili; United States	1:05.03	Yuliya Efimova; Russia	1:05.05
200 m breaststroke	Yuliya Efimova; Russia	2:19.64	Bethany Galat; United States	2:21.77	Shi Jinglin; China	2:21.93
50 m butterfly	Sarah Sjöström; Sweden	24.60; CR	Ranomi Kromowidjojo; Netherlands	25.38	Farida Osman; Egypt	25.39; AF
100 m butterfly	Sarah Sjöström; Sweden	55.53; CR	Emma McKeon; Australia	56.18; OC	Kelsi Worrell; United States	56.37
200 m butterfly	Mireia Belmonte; Spain	2:05.26	Franziska Hentke; Germany	2:05.39	Katinka Hosszú; Hungary	2:06.02
200 m individual medley	Katinka Hosszú; Hungary	2:07.00	Yui Ohashi; Japan	2:07.91; NR	Madisyn Cox; United States	2:09.71
400 m individual medley	Katinka Hosszú; Hungary	4:29.33; CR	Mireia Belmonte; Spain	4:32.17	Sydney Pickrem; Canada	4:32.88
4 × 100 m freestyle relay	United States; Mallory Comerford (52.59) AM; Kelsi Worrell (53.16); Katie Ledecky (53.83); Simone Manuel (52.14); Lia Neal^{[b]} Olivia Smoliga^{[b]}	3:31.72; AM	Australia; Shayna Jack (53.75); Bronte Campbell (52.14); Brittany Elmslie (53.83); Emma McKeon (52.29); Emily Seebohm^{[b]} Madison Wilson^{[b]}	3:32.01	Netherlands; Kim Busch (54.05); Femke Heemskerk (52.84); Maud van der Meer (53.77); Ranomi Kromowidjojo (51.98)	3:32.64
4 × 200 m freestyle relay	United States; Leah Smith (1:55.97); Mallory Comerford (1:56.92); Melanie Margalis (1:56.48); Katie Ledecky (1:54.02); Cierra Runge^{[b]} Hali Flickinger^{[b]} Madisyn Cox^{[b]}	7:43.39	China; Ai Yanhan (1:56.62); Liu Zixuan (1:56.34); Zhang Yuhan (1:56.54); Li Bingjie (1:55.46); Wang Jingzhuo^{[b]} Shen Duo^{[b]}	7:44.96	Australia; Madison Wilson (1:57.33); Emma McKeon (1:56.26); Kotuku Ngawati (1:58.31); Ariarne Titmus (1:56.61); Shayna Jack^{[b]} Leah Neale^{[b]}	7:48.51
4 × 100 m medley relay	United States; Kathleen Baker (58.54); Lilly King (1:04.48); Kelsi Worrell (56.30); Simone Manuel (52.23); Olivia Smoliga^{[b]} Katie Meili^{[b]} Sarah Gibson^{[b]} Mallory Comerford^{[b]}	3:51.55; WR	Russia; Anastasia Fesikova (58.96); Yuliya Yefimova (1:04.03); Svetlana Chimrova (56.99); Veronika Popova (53.40); Natalia Ivaneeva^{[b]}	3:53.38; ER	Australia; Emily Seebohm (58.53); Taylor McKeown (1:06.29); Emma McKeon (56.78); Bronte Campbell (52.69); Holly Barratt^{[b]} Jessica Hansen^{[b]} Brianna Throssell^{[b]} Shayna Jack^{[b]}	3:54.29
AF African record | AM Americas record | AS Asian record | CR Championship record | ER European record | OC Oceania record | WR World record | NR National record

^{b} Swimmers who participated in the heats only and received medals.

=== Mixed ===
Event	Gold		Silver		Bronze	
4 × 100 m freestyle relay	United States; Caeleb Dressel (47.22); Nathan Adrian (47.49); Mallory Comerford (52.71); Simone Manuel (52.18); Blake Pieroni^{[c]} Townley Haas^{[c]} Lia Neal^{[c]} Kelsi Worrell^{[c]}	3:19.60; WR	Netherlands; Ben Schwietert (49.12); Kyle Stolk (47.80); Femke Heemskerk (52.33); Ranomi Kromowidjojo (52.56); Maud van der Meer^{[c]}	3:21.81; ER	Canada; Yuri Kisil (48.51); Javier Acevedo (48.68); Chantal Van Landeghem (53.25); Penny Oleksiak (53.11); Markus Thormeyer^{[c]} Sandrine Mainville^{[c]}	3:23.55
4 × 100 m medley relay	United States; Matt Grevers (52.32); Lilly King (1:04.15); Caeleb Dressel (49.92); Simone Manuel (52.17); Ryan Murphy^{[c]} Kevin Cordes^{[c]} Kelsi Worrell^{[c]} Mallory Comerford^{[c]}	3:38.56; WR	Australia; Mitch Larkin (53.11); Daniel Cave (59.29); Emma McKeon (56.51); Bronte Campbell (52.30); Kaylee McKeown^{[c]} Matthew Wilson^{[c]} Grant Irvine^{[c]} Shayna Jack^{[c]}	3:41.21; OC	Canada; Kylie Masse (58.22); Richard Funk (59.14); Penny Oleksiak (56.18); Yuri Kisil (47.71); Javier Acevedo^{[c]} Rebecca Smith^{[c]} Chantal van Landeghem^{[c]} China; Xu Jiayu (52.37); Yan Zibei (58.98); Zhang Yufei (56.98); Zhu Menghui (52.92); Li Guangyuan^{[c]} Shi Jinglin^{[c]} Li Zhuhao^{[c]}	3:41.25; NR 3:41.25; AS
AF African record | AM Americas record | AS Asian record | CR Championship record | ER European record | OC Oceania record | WR World record | NR National record

^{c} Swimmers who participated in the heats only and received medals.

== Records ==
The following world, championship, and area records were broken during the competition.

=== World records ===
Date	Event	Established for	Time	Name	Nation
23 July	Women's 4 × 100 m freestyle relay final	Women's 100 m freestyle	51.71	Sarah Sjöström	Sweden
25 July	Men's 50 m breaststroke heats	(same)	26.10	Adam Peaty	Great Britain
25 July	Men's 50 m breaststroke semi-final	(same)	25.95	Adam Peaty	Great Britain
25 July	Women's 100 m backstroke final	(same)	58.10	Kylie Masse	Canada
25 July	Women's 100 m breaststroke final	(same)	1:04.13	Lilly King	United States
26 July	Mixed 4 × 100 m medley relay heats	(same)	3:40.28	Ryan Murphy (52.34); Kevin Cordes (58.95); Kelsi Worrell (56.17); Mallory Comerford (52.82)	United States
26 July	Mixed 4 × 100 m medley relay final	(same)	3:38.56	Matt Grevers (52.32); Lilly King (1:04.15); Caeleb Dressel (49.92); Simone Manuel (52.17)	United States
29 July	Women's 50 m freestyle semifinal	(same)	23.67	Sarah Sjöström	Sweden
29 July	Mixed 4 × 100 m freestyle relay final	(same)	3:19.60	Caeleb Dressel (47.22); Nathan Adrian (47.49); Mallory Comerford (52.71); Simone Manuel (52.18)	United States
30 July	Women's 50 m breaststroke final	(same)	29.40	Lilly King	United States
30 July	Women's 4 × 100 m medley relay final	(same)	3:51.55	Kathleen Baker (58.54); Lilly King (1:04.48); Kelsi Worrell (56.30); Simone Manuel (52.23)	United States

=== Championship records ===
Date	Event	Time	Name	Nation
23 July	Women's 400 m freestyle heats	3:59.06	Katie Ledecky	United States
23 July	Men's 100 m breaststroke semifinal	57.75	Adam Peaty	Great Britain
23 July	Women's 400 m freestyle final	3:58.34	Katie Ledecky	United States
24 July	Men's 100 m breaststroke final	57.47	Adam Peaty	Great Britain
24 July	Women's 100 m butterfly final	55.53	Sarah Sjöström	Sweden
27 July	Men's 200 m breaststroke semifinal	2:07.14	Anton Chupkov	Russia
28 July	Men's 200 m breaststroke final	2:06.96	Anton Chupkov	Russia
29 July	Women's 50 m butterfly final	24.60	Sarah Sjöström	Sweden
30 July	Men's 400 metre individual medley final	4:05.90	Chase Kalisz	United States
30 July	Women's 400 metre individual medley final	4:29.33	Katinka Hosszú	Hungary

=== National records ===
Date	Event	Established for	Time	Name	Nation
23 July	Women's 4 × 100 m freestyle relay final	Women's 100 metre freestyle	52.59	Mallory Comerford	United States
23 July	Women's 4 × 100 m freestyle relay final	(same)	3:31.72	Mallory Comerford (52.59); Kelsi Worrell (53.16); Katie Ledecky (53.83); Simone Manuel (52.14)	United States
24 July	Women's 100 m butterfly final	(same)	56.18	Emma McKeon	Australia
24 July	Men's 50 m butterfly semifinal	(same)	22.93	Joseph Schooling	Singapore
25 July	Men's 50 m breaststroke heats	(same)	26.54; 26.67; 27.21	Cameron van der Burgh; João Luiz Gomes Júnior; Yasuhiro Koseki	South Africa; Brazil; Japan
25 July	Men's 200 m freestyle final	(same)	1:44.39	Sun Yang	China
26 July	Mixed 4 × 100 m medley relay heats	(same)	3.44.13; 3:57.02	-	Australia; South Africa
26 July	Women's 50 m backstroke semifinal	(same)	27.18	Etiene Medeiros	Brazil
26 July	Men's 50 m breaststroke final	(same)	26.52	João Gomes Júnior	Brazil
26 July	Men's 800 m freestyle final	(same)	7:40.77	Gabriele Detti	Italy
26 July	Mixed 4 × 100 m medley relay final	(same)	3:41.21; 3:41.25; 3:41.56	-	Australia; China; Great Britain
27 July	Women's 50 m backstroke final	(same)	27.14; 27.23; 27.37	Etiene Medeiros; Aliaksandra Herasimenia; Emily Seebohm	Brazil; Belarus; Australia
27 July	Men's 200 m breaststroke semifinal	(same)	2:07.14	Anton Chupkov	Russia
28 July	Women's 50 metre butterfly heats	(same)	25.74	Farida Osman	Egypt
28 July	Women's 200 m backstroke semifinal	(same)	2.05.81	Emily Seebohm	Australia
28 July	Men's 200 metre backstroke final	(same)	1:53.61	Evgeny Rylov	Russia
28 July	Men's 200 m breaststroke final	(same)	2:06.96	Anton Chupkov	Russia
28 July	Women's 100 metre freestyle final	(same)	52.27	Simone Manuel	United States
29 July	Women's 100 metre freestyle heats	(same)	24.78	Farida Osman	Egypt
29 July	4 × 100 metre mixed freestyle relay heats	(same)	3:26.91; 3:31.38	-	Japan; South Africa
29 July	Women's 50 m breaststroke semifinal	(same)	29:60	Lilly King	United States
29 July	Women's 50 metre freestyle semifinal	(same)	24.62	Farida Osman	Egypt
29 July	Women's 50 m butterfly final	(same)	25.39; 25:48	Farida Osman; Kelsi Worrell	Egypt; United States
29 July	Women's 200 m backstroke final	(same)	2.05.68	Emily Seebohm	Australia
29 July	Women's 800 m freestyle final	(same)	8:15.46	Li Bingjie	China
29 July	Mixed 4 × 100 m freestyle relay final	(same)	3:21.81; 3:24.78	-	Netherlands; Japan
30 July	Women's 50 metre freestyle final	(same)	23.97	Simone Manuel	United States
30 July	Women's 4 × 100 m medley relay final	(same)	3:53.38	Anastasia Fesikova (58.96); Yuliya Yefimova (1:04.03); Svetlana Chimrova (56.99); Veronika Popova (53.40)	Russia
30 July	Men's 4 × 100 metre medley relay final	(same)	3:30.19	Ryosuke Irie (52.80); Yasuhiro Koseki (59.02); Yuki Kobori (51.16); Shinri Shioura (46.69)	Japan
