= Swimming at the 2017 World Aquatics Championships – Men's 50 metre freestyle =

Men's 50 metre freestyle at the 2017 World Aquatics Championships
- Venue: Danube Arena
- Location: Budapest, Hungary
- Dates: 28 July (heats and semifinals); 29 July (final)
- Competitors: 120 from 106 nations
- Winning time: 21.15

Medalists
gold medal	Caeleb Dressel	United States
silver medal	Bruno Fratus	Brazil
bronze medal	Ben Proud	Great Britain

The Men's 50 metre freestyle competition at the 2017 World Championships was held on 28 and 29 July 2017.

== Records ==
Prior to the competition, the existing world and championship records were as follows.

World record	César Cielo (BRA)	20.91	São Paulo, Brazil	18 December 2009
Competition record	César Cielo (BRA)	21.08	Rome, Italy	1 August 2009

== Results ==
=== Heats ===
The heats were held on 28 July at 09:30.

Rank	Heat	Lane	Name	Nationality	Time	Notes
1	12	3	Bruno Fratus	Brazil	21.51	Q
2	11	5	Caeleb Dressel	United States	21.61	Q
3	11	2	Kristian Golomeev	Greece	21.69	Q, NR
4	12	4	Vladimir Morozov	Russia	21.72	Q
5	13	3	Paweł Juraszek	Poland	21.74	Q
6	13	4	Ben Proud	Great Britain	21.93	Q
7	11	4	Cameron McEvoy	Australia	21.95	Q
8	12	2	Luca Dotto	Italy	21.98	Q
9	12	6	César Cielo	Brazil	21.99	Q
9	12	5	Nathan Adrian	United States	21.99	Q
11	11	6	Damian Wierling	Germany	22.00	Q
12	13	5	Andriy Hovorov	Ukraine	22.05	Q
13	13	7	Ari-Pekka Liukkonen	Finland	22.12	Q
14	10	4	Serhiy Shevtsov	Ukraine	22.13	Q
15	13	1	Shinri Shioura	Japan	22.17	Q
16	11	1	Krisztián Takács	Hungary	22.18	Q
17	13	6	Evgeny Sedov	Russia	22.20	
18	11	8	Maxim Lobanovskij	Hungary	22.23	
18	13	8	Ali Khalafalla	Egypt	22.23	
20	12	0	Oussama Sahnoune	Algeria	22.27	
21	13	2	Jesse Puts	Netherlands	22.28	
22	12	7	James Roberts	Australia	22.29	
23	11	7	Katsumi Nakamura	Japan	22.32	
24	12	1	Yu Hexin	China	22.41	
25	13	9	Yuri Kisil	Canada	22.43	
26	13	0	Pieter Timmers	Belgium	22.47	
27	10	2	Artsiom Machekin	Belarus	22.49	
28	10	6	Odysseus Meladinis	Greece	22.50	
29	11	3	Simonas Bilis	Lithuania	22.51	
30	9	4	Wu Chun-feng	Chinese Taipei	22.53	NR
31	11	9	Douglas Erasmus	South Africa	22.56	
32	12	8	Filip Wypych	Poland	22.57	
33	9	7	Andrej Barna	Serbia	22.61	
34	9	5	Federico Grabich	Argentina	22.68	
34	10	3	Shi Yang	China	22.68	
36	10	7	Miguel Nascimento	Portugal	22.69	
37	9	3	Hanser García	Cuba	22.70	
38	9	1	Mislav Sever	Croatia	22.71	
38	10	5	Daniel Hunter	New Zealand	22.71	
40	8	6	Shane Ryan	Ireland	22.79	
41	9	8	Meiron Cheruti	Israel	22.80	
41	10	9	Yauhen Tsurkin	Belarus	22.80	
43	7	8	Bradley Vincent	Mauritius	22.82	NR
44	10	8	Luís Flores	Puerto Rico	22.83	
45	10	0	Zane Waddell	South Africa	22.86	
46	9	0	Cristian Quintero	Venezuela	22.87	
47	9	2	Daniel Zaitsev	Estonia	22.88	
47	12	9	Oleksandr Loginov	Canada	22.88	
49	8	4	Justin Plaschka	Jamaica	22.93	
49	9	6	Sam Perry	New Zealand	22.93	
49	10	1	Hüseyin Emre Sakçı	Turkey	22.93	
52	8	2	Julien Henx	Luxembourg	22.98	
53	8	5	Triady Fauzi Sidiq	Indonesia	22.99	
54	7	0	Alin Coste	Romania	23.04	
55	9	9	Yang Jae-hoon	South Korea	23.05	
56	7	5	Aleksandar Nikolov	Bulgaria	23.08	
57	8	1	Daniel Ramírez	Mexico	23.19	
58	8	8	Pavel Izbisciuc	Moldova	23.23	
59	8	3	Joshua Romany	Trinidad and Tobago	23.30	
59	8	7	Enzo Martínez	Uruguay	23.30	
61	7	1	Oliver Elliot	Chile	23.35	
62	8	9	Peter Wetzlar	Zimbabwe	23.37	
62	8	0	Aleksey Tarasenko	Uzbekistan	23.37	
64	7	6	Nikola Bjelajac	Bosnia and Herzegovina	23.42	
65	11	0	Renzo Tjon-A-Joe	Suriname	23.51	
66	6	3	Matthew Zammit	Malta	23.53	
67	7	4	Hoàng Quý Phước	Vietnam	23.56	
68	7	2	Marco González	Colombia	23.59	
69	3	6	Issa Mohamed	Kenya	23.68	
70	6	7	Giorgi Biganishvili	Georgia	23.72	NR
71	6	4	Anthony Barbar	Lebanon	23.76	
71	6	6	Jean-Luc Zephir	Saint Lucia	23.76	
71	7	3	Willian Vallejos	Paraguay	23.76	
74	6	2	Kevin Avila Soto	Guatemala	23.84	
74	7	7	Vahan Mkhitaryan	Armenia	23.84	
76	6	5	Abdoul Niane	Senegal	23.92	
77	2	4	Denílson da Costa	Mozambique	23.93	NR
78	3	0	Farhan Farhan	Bahrain	23.96	NR
79	6	1	Souhail Hamouchane	Morocco	24.14	
80	5	3	Mohammed Bedour	Jordan	24.15	
80	6	9	Stefano Mitchell	Antigua and Barbuda	24.15	
82	5	4	Mahfizur Rahman Sagor	Bangladesh	24.16	
83	6	0	Jagger Stephens	Guam	24.18	
84	6	8	Hilal Hemed Hilal	Tanzania	24.19	
85	2	5	Thibaut Danho	Ivory Coast	24.24	
86	5	1	Serginni Marten	Curaçao	24.27	
86	5	5	Miguel Mena	Nicaragua	24.27	
88	3	5	Ifeakachuku Nmor	Nigeria	24.31	
89	5	2	Boško Radulović	Montenegro	24.42	
90	7	9	José Alberto Quintanilla	Bolivia	24.43	
91	1	6	Myagmaryn Delgerkhüü	Mongolia	24.49	NR
91	1	2	Bakr Al-Dulaimi	Iraq	24.49	NR
93	5	6	Christian Nikles	Brunei	24.71	
94	5	8	Kerry Ollivierre	Grenada	24.90	
95	5	7	Lum Zhaveli	Kosovo	24.92	
96	1	5	Temaruata Strickland	Cook Islands	25.21	NR
97	2	3	Khaled Al-Houti	Suspended Member Federation	25.24	
98	3	2	Adam Moncherry	Seychelles	25.27	
99	2	1	Belly-Cresus Ganira	Burundi	25.32	NR
100	5	0	Olim Kurbanov	Tajikistan	25.70	NR
101	4	9	Mark Hoare	Eswatini	25.86	NR
102	5	9	Theo Chiabaut	Monaco	25.87	
103	1	3	Cheng Pirort	Cambodia	26.29	
103	4	2	Loiy Juwaihan	Palestine	26.29	
105	4	5	Santisouk Inthavong	Laos	26.36	NR
106	2	6	Joseph Denobrega	Guyana	26.57	
107	3	8	Christian Villacrusis	Northern Mariana Islands	26.61	
108	3	9	Andrew Lapuka	Tonga	26.72	
109	4	3	Albachir Mouctar	Niger	26.75	
110	4	4	Dionisio Augustine	Micronesia	26.76	
111	4	6	Shawn Dingilius-Wallace	Palau	26.95	
112	2	9	Ismah Serunjoji	Uganda	27.37	
113	2	8	Ismail Muthasim Adnan	Maldives	27.72	
114	2	0	Papy Dossous	Haiti	27.98	
115	4	1	Jefferson Kpanou	Benin	28.29	
116	2	7	Houssein Gaber	Djibouti	28.86	
117	2	2	Roland Zouetaba	Burkina Faso	29.53	
118	3	3	Phillip Kinono	Marshall Islands	30.75	
	3	7	Kwesi Jackson	Ghana	DNS	
	3	4	Adama Niane	Senegal	DNS	
	3	1	Mohammad Rajabi	Afghanistan	DNS	
	4	0	Chaoili Aonzoudine	Comoros	DNS	
	4	7	Osman Kamara	Sierra Leone	DNS	
	4	8	Oumar Kaba	Guinea	DNS	
	1	4	Cruz Halbich	Saint Vincent and the Grenadines	DSQ	

=== Semifinals ===
The semifinals were held on 28 July at 18:09.

==== Semifinal 1 ====
Rank	Lane	Name	Nationality	Time	Notes
1	4	Caeleb Dressel	United States	21.29	Q, NR
2	5	Vladimir Morozov	Russia	21.45	Q
3	3	Ben Proud	Great Britain	21.60	Q
4	2	Nathan Adrian	United States	21.83	
5	6	Luca Dotto	Italy	21.92	
6	7	Andriy Hovorov	Ukraine	21.96	
7	8	Krisztián Takács	Hungary	22.05	
8	1	Serhiy Shevtsov	Ukraine	22.22	

==== Semifinal 2 ====
Rank	Lane	Name	Nationality	Time	Notes
1	4	Bruno Fratus	Brazil	21.60	Q
2	1	Ari-Pekka Liukkonen	Finland	21.71	Q
2	5	Kristian Golomeev	Greece	21.71	Q
4	3	Paweł Juraszek	Poland	21.74	Q
5	2	César Cielo	Brazil	21.77	Q
6	6	Cameron McEvoy	Australia	21.81	
7	7	Damian Wierling	Germany	21.93	
8	8	Shinri Shioura	Japan	22.02	

=== Final ===
The final was held on 29 July at 17:39.

Rank	Lane	Name	Nationality	Time	Notes
1st place, gold medalist(s)	4	Caeleb Dressel	United States	21.15	NR
2nd place, silver medalist(s)	6	Bruno Fratus	Brazil	21.27	
3rd place, bronze medalist(s)	3	Ben Proud	Great Britain	21.43	
4	5	Vladimir Morozov	Russia	21.46	
5	1	Paweł Juraszek	Poland	21.47	NR
6	7	Ari-Pekka Liukkonen	Finland	21.67	
7	2	Kristian Golomeev	Greece	21.73	
8	8	César Cielo	Brazil	21.83	
