= Tajikistan at the 2013 World Aquatics Championships =

- Flag of Tajikistan
- FINA code: TJK
- National federation: Tajikistan Swimming Federation

in Barcelona, Spain
- Competitors: 3 in 1 sports
- Medals: Gold 0 Silver 0 Bronze 0 Total 0

World Aquatics Championships appearances
- 1994; 1998; 2001; 2003; 2005; 2007; 2009; 2011; 2013; 2015; 2017; 2019; 2022; 2023; 2024

Other related appearances
- Soviet Union (1973–1991)

Tajikistan competed at the 2013 World Aquatics Championships in Barcelona, Spain between 19 July and 4 August 2013.

== Swimming ==
Tajikistani swimmers achieved qualifying standards in the following events (up to a maximum of 2 swimmers in each event at the A-standard entry time, and 1 at the B-standard):

Men

Athlete	Event	Heat		Semifinal		Final	
Athlete	Event	Time	Rank	Time	Rank	Time	Rank
Umarkhon Alizoda	50 m freestyle	27.14	83	did not advance			
Umarkhon Alizoda	50 m backstroke	33.37	45	did not advance			
Yokubdzhon Umarov	50 m breaststroke	36.50	77	did not advance			
Yokubdzhon Umarov	100 m breaststroke	1:25.50	76	did not advance			

Women

Athlete	Event	Heat		Semifinal		Final	
Athlete	Event	Time	Rank	Time	Rank	Time	Rank
Karina Klimyk	50 m freestyle	32.42	77	did not advance			
Karina Klimyk	100 m freestyle	1:15.45	70	did not advance			
