= Tajikistan at the 2019 World Aquatics Championships =

- Flag of Tajikistan
- FINA code: TJK
- National federation: Tajikistan Swimming Federation

World Aquatics Championships appearances
- 1994; 1998; 2001; 2003; 2005; 2007; 2009; 2011; 2013; 2015; 2017; 2019; 2022; 2023; 2024

Other related appearances
- Soviet Union (1973–1991)

Tajikistan competed at the 2019 World Aquatics Championships in Gwangju, South Korea from 12 to 28 July.

== Swimming ==
Tajikistan entered four swimmers.

Men

Athlete	Event	Heat		Semifinal		Final	
Athlete	Event	Time	Rank	Time	Rank	Time	Rank
Olimjon Ishanov	50 m freestyle	25.73	107	did not advance			
Olimjon Ishanov	50 m backstroke	31.51	68	did not advance			
Alijon Khairulloev	100 m freestyle	58.36	110	did not advance			
Alijon Khairulloev	50 m butterfly	28.81	81	did not advance			

Women

Athlete	Event	Heat		Semifinal		Final	
Athlete	Event	Time	Rank	Time	Rank	Time	Rank
Ekaterina Bordachyova	100 m freestyle	1:10.13	86	did not advance			
Ekaterina Bordachyova	50 m backstroke	37.95	46	did not advance			
Anastasiya Tyurina	50 m freestyle	29.98	=81	did not advance			
Anastasiya Tyurina	50 m butterfly	33.17	58	did not advance			
