= Swimming at the 2017 World Aquatics Championships – Women's 100 metre butterfly =

Women's 100 metre butterfly at the 2017 World Aquatics Championships
- Venue: Danube Arena
- Location: Budapest, Hungary
- Dates: 23 July (heats and semifinals); 24 July (final)
- Competitors: 46 from 40 nations
- Winning time: 55.53

Medalists
gold medal	Sarah Sjöström	Sweden
silver medal	Emma McKeon	Australia
bronze medal	Kelsi Worrell	United States

The Women's 100 metre butterfly competition at the 2017 World Championships was held on 23 and 24 July 2017.

== Records ==
Prior to the competition, the existing world and championship records were as follows.

World record	Sarah Sjöström (SWE)	55.48	Rio de Janeiro, Brazil	7 August 2016
Competition record	Sarah Sjöström (SWE)	55.64	Kazan, Russia	3 August 2015

The following new records were set during this competition.

Date	Event	Name	Nationality	Time	Record
24 July	Final	Sarah Sjöström	Sweden	55.53	CR

== Results ==
=== Heats ===
The heats were held on 23 July at 09:30.

Rank	Heat	Lane	Name	Nationality	Time	Notes
1	5	4	Sarah Sjöström	Sweden	55.96	Q
2	3	4	Kelsi Worrell	United States	56.44	Q
3	4	5	Emma McKeon	Australia	56.81	Q
4	3	5	Rikako Ikee	Japan	57.45	Q
5	4	4	Penny Oleksiak	Canada	57.51	Q
6	4	6	Zhang Yufei	China	57.54	Q
7	5	6	An Se-hyeon	South Korea	57.83	Q
8	5	3	Svetlana Chimrova	Russia	57.85	Q
9	4	3	Ilaria Bianchi	Italy	57.98	Q
10	3	3	Liliána Szilágyi	Hungary	58.00	Q
11	5	7	Sarah Gibson	United States	58.16	Q
12	4	7	Aliena Schmidtke	Germany	58.24	Q
13	3	2	Kimberly Buys	Belgium	58.45	Q
14	5	5	Lu Ying	China	58.51	Q
15	4	2	Alys Thomas	Great Britain	58.65	Q
16	5	1	Brianna Throssell	Australia	58.66	Q
17	5	2	Farida Osman	Egypt	58.67	
18	3	6	Katerine Savard	Canada	58.71	
19	3	1	Louise Hansson	Sweden	58.86	
20	3	8	Emilie Beckmann	Denmark	58.95	
21	3	7	Béryl Gastaldello	France	58.97	
22	5	8	Anna Ntountounaki	Greece	59.01	
23	4	1	Charlotte Atkinson	Great Britain	59.04	
24	5	0	Keren Siebner	Israel	59.72	
25	4	9	Nastja Govejšek	Slovenia	1:00.25	
26	4	8	Lucie Svěcená	Czech Republic	1:00.34	
27	2	4	Martina van Berkel	Switzerland	1:00.50	
28	2	6	Chan Kin Lok	Hong Kong	1:00.52	
29	2	6	Amina Kajtaz	Bosnia and Herzegovina	1:00.77	
30	4	0	Isabella Paéz	Venezuela	1:00.90	
31	2	5	Marie Laura Meza	Costa Rica	1:01.25	
32	3	9	Bryndis Hansen	Iceland	1:01.32	
33	2	3	Emily Muteti	Kenya	1:01.35	NR
34	5	9	Barbora Mišendová	Slovakia	1:01.71	
35	2	2	Jasmine Alkhaldi	Philippines	1:01.80	
36	2	1	Robyn Lee	Zimbabwe	1:02.84	
37	2	8	Julimar Avila	Honduras	1:03.38	NR
38	1	5	Elodie Poo-cheong	Mauritius	1:03.68	NR
39	2	0	Matelita Buadromo	Fiji	1:04.94	
40	1	6	Damini Gowda	India	1:06.19	
41	1	8	Yusra Mardini	FINA Independent Athletes	1:07.99	
42	1	2	Mishael Ayub	Pakistan	1:08.33	NR
43	2	9	Alania Suttie	Samoa	1:08.77	
44	1	3	Lara Aklouk	Jordan	1:09.37	
45	1	1	Faith Edorodion	Nigeria	1:13.89	
46	1	7	Mineri Gomez	Guam	1:17.47	
	1	4	Gessica Stagno	Mozambique	DNS	
	2	7	Azra Avdic	Peru	DNS	

=== Semifinals ===
The semifinals were held on 23 July at 17:42.

==== Semifinal 1 ====
Rank	Lane	Name	Nationality	Time	Notes
1	4	Kelsi Worrell	United States	56.74	Q
2	5	Rikako Ikee	Japan	56.89	Q
3	3	Zhang Yufei	China	57.29	Q
4	6	Svetlana Chimrova	Russia	57.64	Q
5	2	Liliána Szilágyi	Hungary	57.75	
6	7	Aliena Schmidtke	Germany	57.87	
7	8	Brianna Throssell	Australia	58.21	
8	1	Lu Ying	China	58.45	

==== Semifinal 2 ====
Rank	Lane	Name	Nationality	Time	Notes
1	4	Sarah Sjöström	Sweden	55.77	Q
2	5	Emma McKeon	Australia	56.23	Q, =OC
3	3	Penny Oleksiak	Canada	57.07	Q
4	6	An Se-hyeon	South Korea	57.15	Q, NR
5	2	Ilaria Bianchi	Italy	57.95	
6	8	Alys Thomas	Great Britain	58.21	
7	7	Sarah Gibson	United States	58.48	
8	1	Kimberly Buys	Belgium	58.49	

=== Final ===
The final was held on 24 July at 17:40.

Rank	Lane	Name	Nationality	Time	Notes
1st place, gold medalist(s)	4	Sarah Sjöström	Sweden	55.53	CR
2nd place, silver medalist(s)	5	Emma McKeon	Australia	56.18	OC
3rd place, bronze medalist(s)	3	Kelsi Worrell	United States	56.37	
4	2	Penny Oleksiak	Canada	56.94	
5	7	An Se-hyeon	South Korea	57.07	NR
6	6	Rikako Ikee	Japan	57.08	
7	8	Svetlana Chimrova	Russia	57.24	
8	1	Zhang Yufei	China	57.51	
