= British Virgin Islands at the 2017 World Aquatics Championships =

- Flag of the British Virgin Islands
- World Aquatics code: IVB
- National federation: British Virgin Islands Swimming Association

in Budapest, Hungary
- Competitors: 1 in 1 sport
- Medals: Gold 0 Silver 0 Bronze 0 Total 0

World Aquatics Championships appearances
- 1973; 1975; 1978; 1982; 1986; 1991; 1994; 1998; 2001; 2003; 2005; 2007; 2009; 2011; 2013; 2015; 2017; 2019; 2022; 2023; 2024; 2025

The British Virgin Islands competed at the 2017 World Aquatics Championships in Budapest, Hungary from 14 July to 30 July.

== Swimming ==
British Virgin Islands has received a Universality invitation from FINA to send a female swimmer to the World Championships.

Athlete	Event	Heat		Semifinal		Final	
Athlete	Event	Time	Rank	Time	Rank	Time	Rank
Elinah Phillip	Women's 50 m freestyle	26.85	45	did not advance			
Elinah Phillip	Women's 50 m butterfly	28.51	43	did not advance			
