= Tajikistan at the 2024 World Aquatics Championships =

- Flag of Tajikistan
- FINA code: TJK
- National federation: National Swimming Federation of the Republic of Tajikistan

in Doha, Qatar
- Competitors: 2 in 1 sport
- Medals: Gold 0 Silver 0 Bronze 0 Total 0

World Aquatics Championships appearances
- 1994; 1998; 2001; 2003; 2005; 2007; 2009; 2011; 2013; 2015; 2017; 2019; 2022; 2023; 2024

Other related appearances
- Soviet Union (1973–1991)

Tajikistan competed at the 2024 World Aquatics Championships in Doha, Qatar from 2 to 18 February.

== Competitors ==
The following is the list of competitors in the Championships.

Sport	Men	Women	Total
Swimming	1	1	2
Total	1	1	2

== Swimming ==
Tajikistan entered 2 swimmers.

Men

Athlete	Event	Heat		Semifinal		Final	
Athlete	Event	Time	Rank	Time	Rank	Time	Rank
Fakhriddin Madkamov	50 metre freestyle	26.38	91	Did not advance			
Fakhriddin Madkamov	50 metre butterfly	27.25	51	Did not advance			

Women

Athlete	Event	Heat		Semifinal		Final	
Athlete	Event	Time	Rank	Time	Rank	Time	Rank
Ekaterina Bordachyova	50 metre freestyle	29.35	80	Did not advance			
Ekaterina Bordachyova	50 metre butterfly	30.65	45	Did not advance			
