= Sweden at the 2017 World Aquatics Championships =

- Flag of Sweden
- World Aquatics code: SWE
- National federation: Svenska Simidrott
- Website: www.svensksimidrott.se

in Budapest, Hungary
- Competitors: 11 in 2 sports
- Medals Ranked 8th: Gold 3 Silver 1 Bronze 0 Total 4

World Aquatics Championships appearances (overview)
- 1973; 1975; 1978; 1982; 1986; 1991; 1994; 1998; 2001; 2003; 2005; 2007; 2009; 2011; 2013; 2015; 2017; 2019; 2022; 2023; 2024; 2025

Sweden is scheduled to compete at the 2017 World Aquatics Championships in Budapest, Hungary from 14 July to 30 July.

== Medalists ==
Medal	Name	Sport	Event	Date
Gold	Sarah Sjöström	Swimming	Women's 100 m butterfly	July 24
Gold	Sarah Sjöström	Swimming	Women's 50 m butterfly	July 29
Gold	Sarah Sjöström	Swimming	Women's 50 m freestyle	July 30
Silver	Sarah Sjöström	Swimming	Women's 100 m freestyle	July 28

== Swimming ==
Swedish swimmers have achieved qualifying standards in the following events (up to a maximum of 2 swimmers in each event at the A-standard entry time, and 1 at the B-standard):

Men

Athlete	Event	Heat		Semifinal		Final	
Athlete	Event	Time	Rank	Time	Rank	Time	Rank
Victor Johansson	200 m freestyle	1:48.74	36	did not advance			
Victor Johansson	400 m freestyle	3:48.96	17	—N/a		did not advance	
Victor Johansson	800 m freestyle	7:52.66	11	—N/a		did not advance	
Victor Johansson	1500 m freestyle	15:05.91 NR	15	—N/a		did not advance	
Erik Persson	100 m breaststroke	1:00.08 NR	=19	did not advance			
Erik Persson	200 m breaststroke	2:10.21	11 Q	2:09.58	10	did not advance	
Johannes Skagius	50 m breaststroke	27.27	=13 Q	27.02	10	did not advance	

Women

Athlete	Event	Heat		Semifinal		Final	
Athlete	Event	Time	Rank	Time	Rank	Time	Rank
Michelle Coleman	50 m freestyle	25.36	23	did not advance			
Michelle Coleman	100 m freestyle	54.23	13 Q	53.51	9	did not advance	
Michelle Coleman	200 m freestyle	1:57.15	9 Q	1:57.48	12	did not advance	
Louise Hansson	50 m butterfly	26.55	20	did not advance			
Louise Hansson	100 m butterfly	58.86	19	did not advance			
Sophie Hansson	50 m breaststroke	31.44	20	did not advance			
Sophie Hansson	200 m breaststroke	2:28.81	19	did not advance			
Jennie Johansson	50 m breaststroke	30.40	5 Q	30.41	5 Q	30.31	5
Jennie Johansson	100 m breaststroke	1:07.35	13 Q	1:07.93	16	did not advance	
Ida Lindborg	50 m backstroke	28.44	21	did not advance			
Ida Lindborg	100 m backstroke	1:01.40	24	did not advance			
Sarah Sjöström	50 m freestyle	24.08	1 Q	23.67 WR	1 Q	23.69	1st place, gold medalist(s)
Sarah Sjöström	100 m freestyle	53.01	1 Q	52.44	1 Q	52.31	2nd place, silver medalist(s)
Sarah Sjöström	50 m butterfly	25.25	1 Q	25.30	1 Q	24.60 CR	1st place, gold medalist(s)
Sarah Sjöström	100 m butterfly	55.96	1 Q	55.77	1 Q	55.53 CR	1st place, gold medalist(s)
Michelle Coleman; Louise Hansson; Ida Lindborg; Nathalie Lindborg*; Sarah Sjöström	4×100 m freestyle relay	3:35.50	4 Q	—N/a		3:33.94	5
Michelle Coleman; Louise Hansson*; Sophie Hansson*; Jennie Johansson; Ida Lindborg; Sarah Sjöström	4×100 m medley relay	4:01.44	7 Q	—N/a		3:55.28	5

Mixed

Athlete	Event	Heat		Final	
Athlete	Event	Time	Rank	Time	Rank
Victor Johansson; Johannes Skagius; Louise Hansson; Ida Lindborg	4×100 m medley relay	DSQ		did not advance	

== Synchronized swimming ==
Sweden's synchronized swimming team consisted of 1 athlete (1 female).

Women

Athlete	Event	Preliminaries		Final	
Athlete	Event	Points	Rank	Points	Rank
Malin Gerdin	Solo technical routine	72.5904	21	did not advance	
Malin Gerdin	Solo free routine	72.0333	29	did not advance	
