= Tajikistan at the 2022 World Aquatics Championships =

- Flag of Tajikistan
- FINA code: TJK
- National federation: Tajikistan Swimming Federation

World Aquatics Championships appearances
- 1994; 1998; 2001; 2003; 2005; 2007; 2009; 2011; 2013; 2015; 2017; 2019; 2022; 2023; 2024

Other related appearances
- Soviet Union (1973–1991)

Tajikistan competed at the 2022 World Aquatics Championships in Budapest, Hungary from 17 June to 3 July.

== Swimming ==
Tajikistan entered two swimmers.

Men

Athlete	Event	Heat		Semifinal		Final	
Athlete	Event	Time	Rank	Time	Rank	Time	Rank
Fakhriddin Madkamov	50 m freestyle	26.11	77	did not advance			
Fakhriddin Madkamov	50 m butterfly	27.24	61	did not advance			

Women

Athlete	Event	Heat		Semifinal		Final	
Athlete	Event	Time	Rank	Time	Rank	Time	Rank
Ekaterina Bordachyova	50 m freestyle	29.10	66	did not advance			
Ekaterina Bordachyova	100 m freestyle	1:05.38	56	did not advance			
