= Swimming at the 2017 World Aquatics Championships – 4 × 100 metre mixed medley relay =

Harshit dwivedi

4 × 100 metre mixed medley relay at the 2017 World Aquatics Championships
- Venue: Danube Arena
- Location: Budapest, Hungary
- Dates: 26 July (heats and final)
- Competitors: 120 from 24 nations
- Teams: 24
- Winning time: 3:38.56

Medalists
gold medal	Matt Grevers; Lilly King; Caeleb Dressel; Simone Manuel; Ryan Murphy; Kevin Cordes; Kelsi Worrell; Mallory Comerford	United States
silver medal	Mitch Larkin; Daniel Cave; Emma McKeon; Bronte Campbell; Kaylee McKeown; Matthew Wilson; Grant Irvine; Shayna Jack	Australia
bronze medal	Kylie Masse; Richard Funk; Penny Oleksiak; Yuri Kisil; Javier Acevedo; Rebecca Smith; Chantal van Landeghem	Canada
bronze medal	Xu Jiayu; Yan Zibei; Zhang Yufei; Zhu Menghui; Li Guangyuan; Shi Jinglin; Li Zhuhao	China

The 4 × 100 metre mixed medley relay competition at the 2017 World Championships was held on 26 July 2017.

== Records ==
Prior to the competition, the existing world and championship records were as follows.

World record	Great Britain	3:41.71	Kazan, Russia	5 August 2015
Competition record	Great Britain	3:41.71	Kazan, Russia	5 August 2015

The following new records were set during this competition

Date	Event	Nation	Time	Record
26 July	Heat	United States	3:40.28	WR
26 July	Final	United States	3:38.56	WR

== Results ==
=== Heats ===
The heats were held at 10:52.

Rank	Heat	Lane	Nation	Swimmers	Time	Notes
1	2	2	United States	Ryan Murphy (52.34); Kevin Cordes (58.95); Kelsi Worrell (56.17); Mallory Comerford (52.82)	3:40.28	Q, WR
2	4	9	Australia	Kaylee McKeown (1:00.03); Matthew Wilson (59.69); Grant Irvine (51.09); Shayna Jack (53.32)	3:44.13	Q, OC
3	2	6	Canada	Javier Acevedo (54.44); Richard Funk (59.04); Rebecca Smith (57.57); Chantal van Landeghem (53.41)	3:44.46	Q
4	4	4	Great Britain	Georgia Davies (59.54); Ross Murdoch (59.49); James Guy (51.12); Freya Anderson (54.64)	3:44.79	Q
5	3	5	Russia	Kliment Kolesnikov (53.48); Vsevolod Zanko (59.69); Svetlana Chimrova (58.25); Viktoriya Andreyeva (54.67)	3:46.09	Q
6	1	4	China	Li Guangyuan (53.65); Shi Jinglin (1:06.87); Li Zhuhao (52.01); Zhu Menghui (53.72)	3:46.25	Q
7	3	4	Italy	Margherita Panziera (1:01.03); Nicolò Martinenghi (1:00.26); Piero Codia (51.91); Silvia Di Pietro (53.55)	3:46.75	Q
8	2	1	Germany	Lisa Graf (1:00.69); Christian vom Lehn (1:00.53); Aliena Schmidtke (57.70); Marius Kusch (48.74)	3:47.66	Q
9	4	3	Argentina	Andrea Berrino (1:01.78); Macarena Ceballos (1:09.51); Santiago Grassi (52.65); Federico Grabich (48.55)	3:52.49	
10	1	3	Japan	Junya Koga (53.88); Runa Imai (1:09.30); Sakiko Shimizu (59.72); Tsubasa Amai (50.79)	3:53.79	
11	3	9	Mexico	Fernanda González (1:02.72); Miguel de Lara (1:01.36); Daniel Ramírez (54.13); Liliana Ibáñez (56.53)	3:54.74	
12	2	4	Estonia	Sigrid Sepp (1:03.06); Maria Romanjuk (1:09.02); Kregor Zirk (53.37); Daniel Zaitsev (50.49)	3:55.94	
13	2	8	Slovakia	Katarína Listopadová (1:01.68); Tomáš Klobučník (1:01.48); Barbora Mišendová (1:01.53); Richard Nagy (52.09)	3:56.78	
14	4	6	South Africa	Martin Binedell (56.17); Kaylene Corbett (1:10.76); Clayton Jimmie (54.67); Erin Gallagher (55.42)	3:57.02	
15	3	8	Latvia	Kristina Steina (1:05.10); Daniils Bobrovs (1:02.65); Nikolajs Maskaļenko (56.27); Gabriela Ņikitina (56.68)	4:00.70	
16	3	7	Philippines	Nicole Oliva (1:07.02); James Deiparine (1:02.54); Jessie Lacuna (56.60); Jasmine Al-Khaldi (56.95)	4:03.11	
17	2	3	Moldova	Tatiana Salcutan (1:02.22); Alina Bulmag (1:10.26); Pavel Izbisciuc (57.07); Evghenii Paponin (55.49)	4:05.04	
18	3	2	Kenya	Steven Maina (1:00.54); Rebecca Kamau (1:12.80); Emily Muteti (1:02.92); Issa Mohamed (52.58)	4:08.84	
19	4	2	Faroe Islands	Signhild Joensen (1:04.10); Róland Toftum (1:06.63); Óli Mortensen (58.62); Sára Ryggshamar Nysted (1:00.94)	4:10.29	
20	4	7	Angola	Catarina Sousa (1:10.80); Mario Ervedosa (1:05.07); Daniel Francisco (59.77); Ana Sofia Nóbrega (1:00.04)	4:15.68	
21	4	0	Aruba	Mikel Schreuders (1:03.75); Jordy Groters (1:04.35); Daniella van den Berg (1:09.24); Allyson Ponson (59.35)	4:16.69	
22	3	6	Maldives	Mubal Azzam Ibrahim (1:17.92); Sajina Aishath (1:31.53); Ismail Muthasim Adnan (1:09.07); Aminath Shajan (1:08.83)	5:07.35	
			Hungary	Gábor Balog (54.67); Dániel Gyurta (DSQ); Liliána Szilágyi; Zsuzsanna Jakabos	DSQ	
			Sweden	Ida Lindborg (1:01.50); Johannes Skagius (1:00.42); Louise Hansson (DSQ); Victor Johansson	DSQ	
	1	5	Seychelles	Alexus Laird; Adam Moncherry; Felicity Passon; Dean Hoffman	DNS	
	2	5	Israel	DNS		
	2	7	Madagascar	DNS		
	3	0	Mozambique	DNS		
	3	1	Sri Lanka	DNS		
	3	3	Egypt	DNS		
	4	1	Finland	DNS		

=== Final ===
The final was held at 19:19.

Rank	Lane	Nation	Swimmers	Time	Notes
1st place, gold medalist(s)	4	United States	Matt Grevers (52.32); Lilly King (1:04.15); Caeleb Dressel (49.92); Simone Manuel (52.17)	3:38.56	WR
2nd place, silver medalist(s)	5	Australia	Mitch Larkin (53.11); Daniel Cave (59.29); Emma McKeon (56.51); Bronte Campbell (52.30)	3:41.21	OC
3rd place, bronze medalist(s)	3	Canada	Kylie Masse (58.22); Richard Funk (59.14); Penny Oleksiak (56.18); Yuri Kisil (47.71)	3.41.25	NR
3rd place, bronze medalist(s)	7	China	Xu Jiayu (52.37); Yan Zibei (58.98); Zhang Yufei (56.98); Zhu Menghui (52.92)	3:41.25	AS
5	6	Great Britain	Georgia Davies (59.98); Adam Peaty (57.12); James Guy (50.51); Siobhan-Marie O'Connor (53.95)	3:41.56	ER
6	2	Russia	Grigoriy Tarasevich (53.35); Kirill Prigoda (58.64); Svetlana Chimrova (57.18); Veronika Popova (53.85)	3:43.02	NR
7	8	Germany	Lisa Graf (1:00.55); Marco Koch (59.89); Aliena Schmidtke (57.29); Damian Wierling (48.30)	3:46.03	
8	1	Italy	Matteo Milli (54.24); Nicolò Martinenghi (59.61); Ilaria Bianchi (57.25); Federica Pellegrini (55.23)	3.46.33	
