= Swimming at the 2017 World Aquatics Championships – Women's 50 metre breaststroke =

Women's 50 metre breaststroke at the 2017 World Aquatics Championships
- Venue: Danube Arena
- Location: Budapest, Hungary
- Dates: 29 July (heats and semifinals); 30 July (final)
- Competitors: 53 from 48 nations
- Winning time: 29.40 World record

Medalists
gold medal	Lilly King	United States
silver medal	Yuliya Yefimova	Russia
bronze medal	Katie Meili	United States

The Women's 50 metre breaststroke competition at the 2017 World Championships was held on 29 and 30 July 2017.

== Records ==
Prior to the competition, the existing world and championship records were as follows.

World record	Rūta Meilutytė (LTU)	29.48	Barcelona, Spain	3 August 2013
Competition record	Rūta Meilutytė (LTU)	29.48	Barcelona, Spain	3 August 2013

The following new records were set during this competition.

Date	Event	Name	Nationality	Time	Record
30 July	Final	Lilly King	United States	29.40	WR

== Results ==
=== Heats ===
The heats were held on 29 July at 10:07.

Rank	Heat	Lane	Name	Nationality	Time	Notes
1	6	4	Lilly King	United States	29.76	Q
2	5	4	Yuliya Yefimova	Russia	29.99	Q
3	5	3	Arianna Castiglioni	Italy	30.33	Q, NR
4	6	5	Katie Meili	United States	30.37	Q
5	4	5	Jennie Johansson	Sweden	30.40	Q
6	4	4	Rūta Meilutytė	Lithuania	30.58	Q
7	5	6	Jessica Hansen	Australia	30.59	Q
8	5	5	Sarah Vasey	Great Britain	30.71	Q
9	4	2	Natalia Ivaneeva	Russia	30.81	Q
10	6	6	Jenna Laukkanen	Finland	30.82	Q
11	4	6	Hrafnhildur Lúthersdóttir	Iceland	30.88	Q
12	6	7	Veera Kivirinta	Finland	30.89	Q
13	4	3	Martina Carraro	Italy	30.92	Q
14	6	3	Satomi Suzuki	Japan	30.95	Q
15	5	1	Rachel Nicol	Canada	31.02	Q
16	4	1	Suo Ran	China	31.22	Q
17	6	8	Rikke Møller Pedersen	Denmark	31.29	
18	4	7	Dominika Sztandera	Poland	31.31	
19	6	2	Mariya Liver	Ukraine	31.33	
20	5	2	Sophie Hansson	Sweden	31.44	
21	5	7	Macarena Ceballos	Argentina	31.65	NR
22	6	1	Petra Chocová	Czech Republic	31.69	
23	4	8	Amit Ivry	Israel	31.70	
24	3	4	Susann Bjørnsen	Norway	31.75	
25	6	0	Kaylene Corbett	South Africa	31.91	
26	5	0	Maria Romanjuk	Estonia	31.92	
27	4	0	Anna Sztankovics	Hungary	31.94	
28	5	8	Andrea Podmaníková	Slovakia	32.04	
29	4	9	Mercedes Toledo	Venezuela	32.24	
30	6	9	Dana Kolidzeja	Latvia	32.59	
31	5	9	Anandia Evato	Indonesia	32.62	
32	3	6	Tilka Paljk	Zambia	32.72	
33	3	2	Amy Micallef	Malta	33.46	NR
34	3	5	Evita Leter	Suriname	33.77	
35	3	3	Dariya Talanova	Kyrgyzstan	33.85	
36	3	7	Vanessa Rivas	Dominican Republic	34.40	
37	3	8	Oreoluwa Cherebin	Grenada	34.88	
38	3	1	Meri Mumladze	Georgia	34.91	
39	1	4	Jang Myong-gyong	North Korea	35.11	
40	2	1	Naomy Grand'Pierre	Haiti	35.85	
41	2	3	Mahfuza Khatun	Bangladesh	36.53	
42	2	4	Colleen Furgeson	Marshall Islands	36.97	
43	3	0	Melisa Zhdrella	Kosovo	37.06	
44	2	7	Angelika Ouedraogo	Burkina Faso	37.89	
45	1	7	Karina Klimyk	Tajikistan	38.47	
46	2	2	Elen Yesayan	Armenia	38.67	
47	1	6	Sajina Aishath	Maldives	39.74	
48	2	0	Siri Arun Budcharern	Laos	40.57	
49	2	6	Laila Zangwio	Ghana	42.03	
50	1	1	Roukaya Mahamane	Niger	46.49	
51	3	9	Bunturabie Jalloh	Sierra Leone	49.38	
52	2	5	Fatoumata Conde	Guinea	53.04	
1	2	Fatou Diagne	Senegal			
2	8	Kokoe Ahyee	Ivory Coast			
2	9	Albertine Rwabukamba	Rwanda	DSQ		

=== Semifinals ===
The semifinals were held on 29 July at 17:56.

==== Semifinal 1 ====
Rank	Lane	Name	Nationality	Time	Notes
1	4	Yuliya Yefimova	Russia	29.73	Q
2	5	Katie Meili	United States	30.12	Q
3	3	Rūta Meilutytė	Lithuania	30.40	Q
4	6	Sarah Vasey	Great Britain	30.46	Q
5	2	Jenna Laukkanen	Finland	30.92	
6	1	Satomi Suzuki	Japan	30.95	
7	7	Veera Kivirinta	Finland	30.98	
8	8	Suo Ran	China	31.14	

==== Semifinal 2 ====
Rank	Lane	Name	Nationality	Time	Notes
1	4	Lilly King	United States	29.60	Q, AM
2	3	Jennie Johansson	Sweden	30.41	Q
3	5	Arianna Castiglioni	Italy	30.46	Q
4	8	Rachel Nicol	Canada	30.49	Q
5	6	Jessica Hansen	Australia	30.67	
6	7	Hrafnhildur Lúthersdóttir	Iceland	30.71	NR
7	2	Natalia Ivaneeva	Russia	30.82	
8	1	Martina Carraro	Italy	31.16	

=== Final ===
The final was held on 30 July at 17:32.

Rank	Lane	Name	Nationality	Time	Notes
1st place, gold medalist(s)	4	Lilly King	United States	29.40	WR
2nd place, silver medalist(s)	5	Yuliya Yefimova	Russia	29.57	
3rd place, bronze medalist(s)	3	Katie Meili	United States	29.99	
4	6	Rūta Meilutytė	Lithuania	30.20	
5	2	Jennie Johansson	Sweden	30.31	
6	7	Sarah Vasey	Great Britain	30.62	
7	1	Arianna Castiglioni	Italy	30.74	
8	8	Rachel Nicol	Canada	30.80	
