= Chantal Van Landeghem =

Canadian swimmer (born 1994)

Chantal van Landeghem
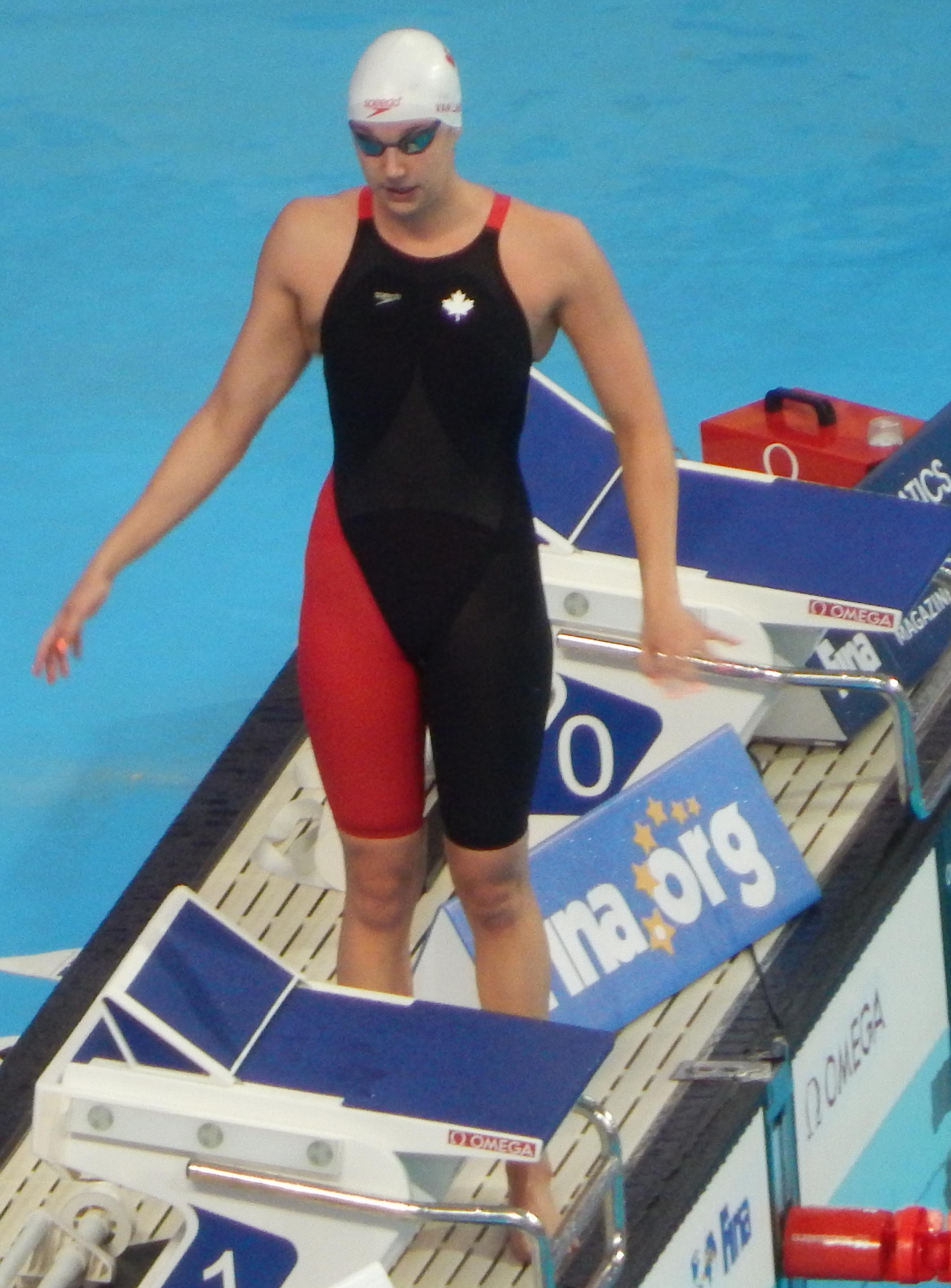
- Van Landeghem in 2015

Personal information
- Full name: Chantal Jean van Landeghem
- National team: Canada
- Born: March 5, 1994 (age 32) Winnipeg, Manitoba, Canada
- Height: 6 ft 4 in (193 cm)
- Weight: 170 lb (77 kg)

Sport
- Sport: Swimming
- Strokes: Freestyle, butterfly
- Club: Manta Swim Club
- College team: University of Georgia
- Coach: Ben Titley
Medal record
Women's swimming
Representing Canada
Summer Olympics
Bronze medal – third place	2016 Rio de Janeiro	4×100 m freestyle
World Championships (LC)
Bronze medal – third place	2015 Kazan	4×100 m mixed freestyle
Bronze medal – third place	2017 Budapest	4x100 m mixed freestyle
Bronze medal – third place	2017 Budapest	4x100 m mixed medley
Pan Pacific Championships
Bronze medal – third place	2014 Gold Coast	50 m freestyle
Bronze medal – third place	2014 Gold Coast	4×100 m medley
Pan American Games
Gold medal – first place	2015 Toronto	100 m freestyle
Gold medal – first place	2015 Toronto	4×100 m freestyle
Silver medal – second place	2015 Toronto	4×100 m medley

Chantal Jean van Landeghem (born March 5, 1994) is a Canadian competition swimmer who specializes in the freestyle and butterfly events. She won a bronze medal at the 2016 Summer Olympics as part of the women's 4 x 100 m relay, this was Canada's first relay medal in that event for forty years. Van Landeghem is the reigning 100-metre freestyle and 4 × 100-metre freestyle champion in the Pan American Games, setting games records in both events. Van Landeghem is currently studying and competing through the University of Georgia. She was a competitor for Manitoba at the 2009 Canada Summer Games where she won two gold, a silver, and a bronze medal.

== Career ==
Van Landeghem next competed at the 2011 World Aquatics Championships for Canada where she helped the 4 × 100-metre freestyle relay team place sixth. Van Landeghem also competed at the 2011 FINA World Junior Swimming Championships where she won a silver in the 100-metre freestyle and the 4 × 100-metre freestyle relay for Canada as well as bronze medals in the 50-metre backstroke and butterfly. Her results led to her being named the Manitoba Female Athlete of the Year for 2011. In 2013, she was named to the Senior National Team and competed in Barcelona at the FINA World Championship where she placed 9th in the 50 meter LC freestyle.

At the 2015 Pan American Games, van Landeghem started in the final of the women's 100 free. There she faced off against American star Natalie Coughlin. In the final van Landeghem trailed Coughlin but pulled ahead on the final lap and upset the favourite, setting a personal best and games record in the process. She said after the race that the home crowd "got me into it. I kept saying thank you when I got out of the water because they were amazing. They really pushed me the last 15 metres. It's nothing like I've ever experienced just because it was on home soil in Canada. Seeing that flag raised, I was just overcome with so much pride." Van Landeghem then repeated the upset over Coughlin, this time in the 4 × 100 freestyle relay where she beat the American again in a closer finish while setting another games record. After the second upset she said "my confidence is sky-high right now. I've don't think it's ever been this high. Beating Natalie is obviously huge, but personally, a best time, that's all I could ask for. We're going into worlds in a couple weeks after this. To have these performances going into worlds is a huge confidence booster."

She competed for Canada for the 2016 Summer Olympics. In the women's 4 x 100 m relay she helped the Canadian women to the third seed in the final. The final saw the more of the best swimmer's join their competitors as well as the Canadians. Van Landeghem swam with Penny Oleksiak, Taylor Ruck, Michelle Williams and Sandrine Mainville. Together they won the bronze medal in the final behind Australia and the United States. The medal was Canada's first women's relay medal at the Olympics in 40 years. An elated van Landeghem said after the race that "We belong here and we belong on that podium. "I'm just so excited right now, I'm so proud of these girls and I hope we made Canada proud tonight." Van Landeghem was named as part of the Canadian Press' team of the year when they declared the women's swim team as their winner, the award was given to the women following their strong performances at Rio.

Her next medal came in the form of a bronze medal while competing in the mixed 4 × 100 m medley while swimming the anchor and freestyle leg at the 2017 World Aquatics Championships semi-finals for the Canadian team. She did not compete in the final though, instead Yuri Kisil swam the freestyle there in a tactical move, as the only male against a slate of female competitors. Kisil touched in a tie with the Chinese team for third.

She retired from competitive swimming in December 2017.

== Personal ==
Van Landeghem was born in Winnipeg, Manitoba, and began swimming at the Manta Swim Club based in the Pan Am Pool from the age of 4. Upon graduating high school she was recruited by the Georgia Bulldogs swimming and diving team and lived in Athens, Georgia while she completed her degree in psychology.

== Personal bests ==
=== Long course (50 m pool) ===
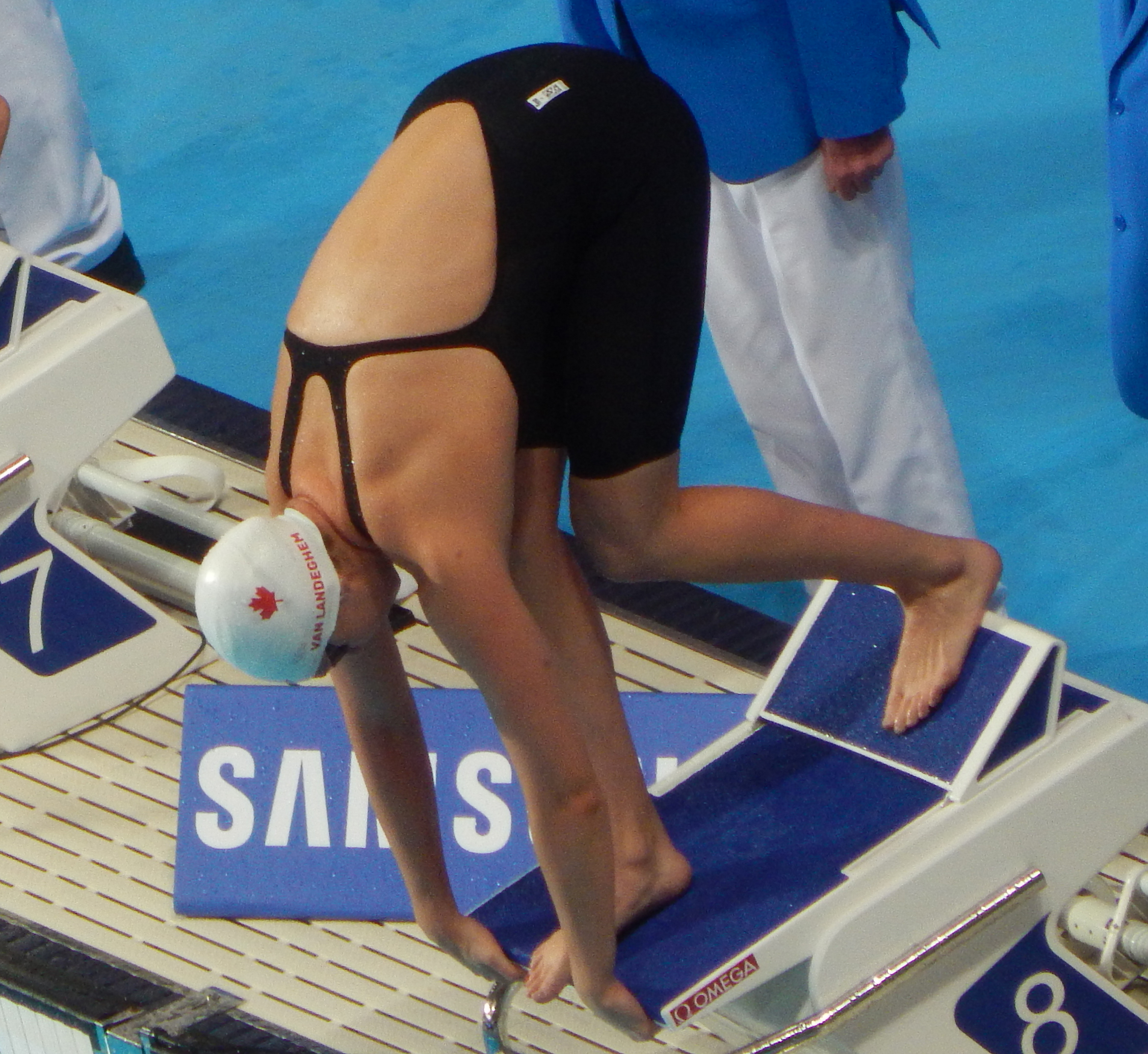
Kazan 2015

Event	Time	Venue	Date	Notes
50 m butterfly	26.85	Lima	18 Aug 2011	
100 m butterfly	1:00.43	Montreal	10 Jul 2009	
50 m freestyle	24.39	Kazan, Russia	9 Aug 2015	Canadian Record
100 m freestyle	53.83	Toronto	14 July 2015	Pan Am Games record
200 m freestyle	2:04.59	Charlotte	14 May 2011	

=== Short course (25 m pool) ===
Event	Time	Venue	Date	Notes
50 m freestyle	23.85	Eindhoven	7 Aug 2013	
100 m freestyle	52.87	Berlin	11 Aug 2013	
