= Swimming at the 2017 World Aquatics Championships – Men's 50 metre breaststroke =

Men's 50 metre breaststroke at the 2017 World Aquatics Championships
- Venue: Danube Arena
- Location: Budapest, Hungary
- Dates: 25 July (heats and semifinals); 26 July (final)
- Competitors: 82 from 78 nations
- Winning time: 25.99

Medalists
gold medal	Adam Peaty	Great Britain
silver medal	João Gomes Júnior	Brazil
bronze medal	Cameron van der Burgh	South Africa

The Men's 50 metre breaststroke competition at the 2017 World Championships was held on 25 and 26 July 2017.

== Records ==
Prior to the competition, the existing world and championship records were as follows.

World record	Adam Peaty (GBR)	26.42	Kazan, Russia	4 August 2015
Competition record	Adam Peaty (GBR)	26.42	Kazan, Russia	4 August 2015

The following new records were set during this competition.

Date	Event	Name	Nationality	Time	Record
25 July	Heat	Adam Peaty	Great Britain	26.10	WR
25 July	Semifinal	Adam Peaty	Great Britain	25.95	WR

== Results ==
=== Heats ===
The heats were held on 25 July at 09:30.

Rank	Heat	Lane	Name	Nationality	Time	Notes
1	9	4	Adam Peaty	Great Britain	26.10	Q, WR
2	8	5	Cameron van der Burgh	South Africa	26.54	Q, AF
3	8	4	João Gomes Júnior	Brazil	26.67	Q, AM
4	7	4	Kevin Cordes	United States	26.83	Q
5	7	3	Kirill Prigoda	Russia	26.91	Q, NR
6	9	3	Felipe Lima	Brazil	26.93	Q
7	9	5	Ilya Shymanovich	Belarus	27.01	Q, NR
8	8	2	Fabio Scozzoli	Italy	27.04	Q
9	7	5	Nicolò Martinenghi	Italy	27.08	Q
10	7	6	Yasuhiro Koseki	Japan	27.21	Q, AS
11	9	7	Giedrius Titenis	Lithuania	27.24	Q
12	7	2	Yan Zibei	China	27.25	Q, NR
13	8	7	Čaba Silađi	Serbia	27.27	Q
13	9	6	Johannes Skagius	Sweden	27.27	Q
15	9	2	Cody Miller	United States	27.31	Q
16	8	3	Peter Stevens	Slovenia	27.39	QSO
16	9	1	Arno Kamminga	Netherlands	27.39	QSO, NR
16	8	6	Vsevolod Zanko	Russia	27.39	QSO
19	9	8	Richard Funk	Canada	27.59	
20	7	7	Nikola Obrovac	Croatia	27.61	
21	6	2	Ari-Pekka Liukkonen	Finland	27.66	
22	8	1	Jorge Murillo	Colombia	27.67	
23	8	0	Christian vom Lehn	Germany	27.68	
24	6	3	Matthew Wilson	Australia	27.69	
25	7	1	Marcin Stolarski	Poland	27.73	
26	8	9	Dmitriy Balandin	Kazakhstan	27.74	
27	9	0	Youssef El-Kamash	Egypt	27.79	
27	9	9	Renato Prono	Paraguay	27.79	
29	6	1	Yannick Käser	Switzerland	27.84	
30	6	5	Hüseyin Emre Sakçı	Turkey	27.90	
31	7	0	Marek Botík	Slovakia	27.92	
32	7	8	Édgar Crespo	Panama	27.93	
33	8	8	Lachezar Shumkov	Bulgaria	28.07	
33	7	9	Ioannis Karpouzlis	Greece	28.07	
35	6	6	Martín Melconian	Uruguay	28.10	
36	5	5	James Deiparine	Philippines	28.13	
36	6	7	Azad Al-Barazi	Syria	28.13	
38	6	4	Nikolajs Maskaļenko	Latvia	28.27	
39	6	9	Carlos Claverie	Venezuela	28.28	
40	5	2	Miguel de Lara	Mexico	28.29	
41	5	6	Filipp Provorkov	Estonia	28.37	
42	5	7	Jordy Groters	Aruba	28.40	
43	6	8	Gábor Financsek	Hungary	28.44	
44	5	4	Indra Gunawan	Indonesia	28.50	
45	5	1	Kirill Vais	Kyrgyzstan	28.61	
46	6	0	Wu Chun-feng	Chinese Taipei	28.75	
47	4	5	James Lawson	Zimbabwe	28.85	=NR
48	4	3	Mario Ervedosa	Angola	29.26	
49	2	4	Santiago Cavanagh	Bolivia	29.29	
50	4	1	Evghenii Paponin	Moldova	29.42	
51	4	2	N'Nhyn Fernander	Bahamas	29.75	
52	5	8	Marc Rojas	Dominican Republic	29.84	
53	4	0	Sebastien Kouma	Mali	29.92	
54	5	0	Corey Ollivierre	Grenada	29.94	
55	4	4	Gregory Penny	U.S. Virgin Islands	29.96	
56	4	7	Rainier Rafaela	Curaçao	29.97	
57	5	9	Roland Toftum	Faroe Islands	30.16	
58	3	4	Ronan Wantenaar	Namibia	30.27	
59	3	5	Ashley Seeto	Papua New Guinea	30.30	
60	4	6	Abdoul Niane	Senegal	30.31	
61	2	1	Adrian Robinson	Botswana	30.38	
62	4	8	Epeli Rabua	Fiji	30.44	
63	4	9	Alex Axiotis	Zambia	30.65	
64	1	4	Muis Ahmad	Brunei	30.73	
65	3	3	Anthony Souaiby	Lebanon	30.84	
66	2	5	Dionisio Augustine	Federated States of Micronesia	32.28	
66	2	7	Tindwende Sawadogo	Burkina Faso	32.38	
68	3	2	Shuvam Shrestha	Nepal	32.50	
69	3	0	Slava Sihanouvong	Laos	32.60	
70	2	6	Adil Bharmal	Tanzania	32.67	
71	2	3	Joshua Tibatemwa	Uganda	32.77	
72	1	5	Abdulmalik Ben Musa	Libya	32.92	
73	1	2	Simanga Dlamini	Eswatini	33.07	
74	3	1	Alassane Seydou	Niger	35.00	
75	3	7	Moris Beale	Sierra Leone	35.13	
76	1	3	Ramziyor Khorkashov	Tajikistan	35.52	
77	3	6	Ablam Awoussou	Benin	36.34	
78	1	6	Athoumane Solihi	Comoros	36.61	
79	3	9	Hamid Rahimi	Afghanistan	37.95	
80	2	2	Ebrahim Al-Maleki	Yemen	38.98	
81	3	8	Houssein Gaber	Djibouti	40.55	
	2	0	Dasar Xhambazi	Kosovo	DNS	
	5	3	Wassim Elloumi	Tunisia	DNS	
	2	8	Jegan Jobe	Gambia	DNS	

=== Swim-off ===
Rank	Lane	Name	Nationality	Time	Notes
1	4	Peter Stevens	Slovenia	27.38	Q
2	5	Vsevolod Zanko	Russia	27.41	
3	3	Arno Kamminga	Netherlands	27.43	

=== Semifinals ===
The semifinals were held on 25 July at 18:11.

==== Semifinal 1 ====
Rank	Lane	Name	Nationality	Time	Notes
1	3	Felipe Lima	Brazil	26.68	Q
2	4	Cameron van der Burgh	South Africa	26.74	Q
3	5	Kevin Cordes	United States	26.86	Q
4	6	Fabio Scozzoli	Italy	26.96	Q, NR
5	1	Johannes Skagius	Sweden	27.02	NR
6	2	Yasuhiro Koseki	Japan	27.17	AS
7	8	Peter Stevens	Slovenia	27.20	
8	7	Yan Zibei	China	27.33	

==== Semifinal 2 ====
Rank	Lane	Name	Nationality	Time	Notes
1	4	Adam Peaty	Great Britain	25.95	Q, WR
2	3	Kirill Prigoda	Russia	26.85	Q, NR
3	5	João Gomes Júnior	Brazil	26.86	Q
4	6	Ilya Shymanovich	Belarus	26.90	Q, NR
5	2	Nicolò Martinenghi	Italy	27.01	
6	1	Čaba Silađi	Serbia	27.18	
7	7	Giedrius Titenis	Lithuania	27.24	
8	8	Cody Miller	United States	27.46	

=== Final ===
The final was held on 26 July at 18:17.

Rank	Lane	Name	Nationality	Time	Notes
1st place, gold medalist(s)	4	Adam Peaty	Great Britain	25.99	
2nd place, silver medalist(s)	7	João Gomes Júnior	Brazil	26.52	AM
3rd place, bronze medalist(s)	3	Cameron van der Burgh	South Africa	26.60	
4	5	Felipe Lima	Brazil	26.78	
5	2	Kevin Cordes	United States	26.80	
6	8	Fabio Scozzoli	Italy	26.91	NR
7	6	Kirill Prigoda	Russia	27.01	
8	1	Ilya Shymanovich	Belarus	27.27	
