= Hantan Raharvel =

Malagasy swimmer

Personal information
- Born: 28 August 1996 (age 29)

Sport
- Sport: Swimming

Hantan Raharvel (born 28 August 1996) is a Malagasy swimmer. She competed in the women's 50 metre freestyle event at the 2017 World Aquatics Championships.
