= Sandrine Mainville =

Canadian swimmer

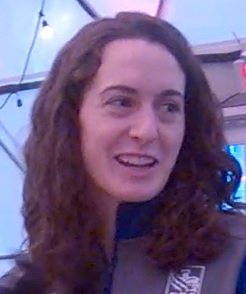
- Mainville in 2018

Personal information
- National team: Canada
- Born: 20 March 1992 (age 34) Boucherville, Quebec, Canada
- Height: 1.73 m (5 ft 8 in)
- Weight: 65 kg (143 lb)

Sport
- Sport: Swimming
- Strokes: Freestyle
- Club: High Performance Centre - Ontario
Medal record
Women's swimming
Representing Canada
Olympic Games
Bronze medal – third place	2016 Rio de Janeiro	4×100 m freestyle
World Championships (LC)
Bronze medal – third place	2015 Kazan	4×100 m mixed freestyle
Bronze medal – third place	2017 Budapest	4x100 m mixed freestyle
World Championships (SC)
Gold medal – first place	2016 Windsor	4x50 m freestyle
Bronze medal – third place	2016 Windsor	4x50 m mixed free
Pan American Games
Gold medal – first place	2015 Toronto	4×100 m freestyle
Commonwealth Games
Bronze medal – third place	2014 Glasgow	4×100 m freestyle
Bronze medal – third place	2014 Glasgow	4×100 m medley

Sandrine Mainville (born March 20, 1992) is a Canadian competition swimmer who specializes in the freestyle. She won a bronze medal in the 2015 World Aquatics Championships in the 4 x 100 m mixed freestyle in Kazan, Russia. Mainville was also part of the 2015 Pan American Games champion 4 x 100 m freestyle relay team for Canada in Toronto.

Mainville competed for Canada's Olympic team at the 2016 Summer Olympics. She swam as part of Canada's relay team in the women's 4 x 100 m freestyle event. The final saw Canada swimming against the powerhouse Australia and United States team, Canada would finish behind them while fending off the Netherlands for bronze. Mainville swam with teammates Penelope Oleksiak, Taylor Ruck, Michelle Williams and Chantal van Landeghem.

== See also ==
- List of Olympic medalists in swimming (women)
- List of World Aquatics Championships medalists in swimming (women)
- List of Commonwealth Games medallists in swimming (women)
