= Anastasiya Tyurina =

Tajikistani swimmer

Personal information
- Nationality: Tajikistani
- Born: 27 September 2001 (age 24) Dushanbe, Tajikistan
- Height: 165 cm (5 ft 5 in)
- Weight: 50 kg (110 lb)

Sport
- Sport: Swimming
- Strokes: Freestyle
- College team: Dushanbe Youth Sports School

Anastasiya Tyurina (born 27 September 2001) is a Tajikistani swimmer. She competed in the women's 50 metre freestyle event at the 2016 Summer Olympics, finishing 73rd with a time of 31.15 seconds and failing to advance out of the heats.

In 2019, she represented Tajikistan at the 2019 World Aquatics Championships held in Gwangju, South Korea. She competed in the women's 50 metre freestyle and women's 50 metre butterfly events. In both events she did not advance to compete in the semi-finals.

In 2021, she competed in the women's 50 metre freestyle event at the 2020 Summer Olympics held in Tokyo, Japan.
