= Olimjon Ishanov =

Tajikistani swimmer (born 1998)

Olim Kurbanov
Personal information
- Born: 21 June 1998 (age 28) Dushanbe, Tajikistan

Sport
- Sport: Swimming

Olimjon Ishanov (born 21 June 1998), formerly known as Olim Kurbanov, is a Tajikistani swimmer. He competed in the men's 50 metre freestyle at the 2016 Summer Olympics. He ranked 62nd in the heats with a time of 25.77 seconds and did not advance to the semifinals. Kurbanov again competed in the 50 m freestyle at the 2020 Summer Olympics, finishing with a time of 19.06 seconds and failing to make the semifinals.
