= Karina Klimyk =

Tajikistani swimmer

Personal information
- Born: 12 December 1999 (age 26)

Sport
- Sport: Swimming

Karina Klimyk (born 12 December 1999) is a Tajikistani swimmer. She competed in the women's 50 metre breaststroke event at the 2017 World Aquatics Championships. In 2014, she represented Tajikistan at the 2014 Summer Youth Olympics held in Nanjing, China.
