= Tajikistan at the 2011 World Aquatics Championships =

Sporting event delegation

Flag of Tajikistan

Tajikistan competed at the 2011 World Aquatics Championships in Shanghai, China between July 16 and 31, 2011.

== Swimming ==
Tajikistan qualified 3 swimmers.

Men

Athlete	Event	Heats		Semifinals		Final	
Athlete	Event	Time	Rank	Time	Rank	Time	Rank
Alisher Chingizov	Men's 50m Freestyle	29.05	102	did not advance			
Alisher Chingizov	Men's 50m Butterfly	DNS		did not advance			
Ruslan Oliftaev	Men's 50m Breaststroke	37.56	45	did not advance			
Ruslan Oliftaev	Men's 100m Breaststroke	1:25.82	80	did not advance			

Women

Athlete	Event	Heats		Semifinals		Final	
Athlete	Event	Time	Rank	Time	Rank	Time	Rank
Katerina Izmailova	Women's 50m Freestyle	31.38	67	did not advance			
Katerina Izmailova	Women's 100m Freestyle	1:11.56	74	did not advance			
