= Denmark at the 2025 World Aquatics Championships =

- Flag of Denmark
- World Aquatics code: DEN

in Singapore
- Competitors: 13 in 3 sports
- Medals: Gold 0 Silver 0 Bronze 0 Total 0

World Aquatics Championships appearances (overview)
- 1973; 1975; 1978; 1982; 1986; 1991; 1994; 1998; 2001; 2003; 2005; 2007; 2009; 2011; 2013; 2015; 2017; 2019; 2022; 2023; 2024; 2025

Denmark are competing at the 2025 World Aquatics Championships in Singapore from July 11 to August 3, 2025.

== Athletes by discipline ==
The following is the number of competitors who will participate at the Championships per discipline.

Sport	Men	Women	Total
Diving	1	1	2
High diving	0	1	1
Swimming	5	5	10
Total	6	7	13

== Diving ==
Men

Athlete	Event	Preliminaries		Semi-finals		Final	
Athlete	Event	Points	Rank	Points	Rank	Points	Rank
Jonas Brockstedt Madsen	1 m springboard	285.45	40	—		Did not advance	

Women

Athlete	Event	Preliminaries		Semi-finals		Final	
Athlete	Event	Points	Rank	Points	Rank	Points	Rank
Laura Valore	1 m springboard	193.80	41	—		Did not advance	

== High diving ==
Athlete	Event	Rounds 1–4		Rounds 5–6	
Athlete	Event	Points	Rank	Points	Rank
Annika Bornebusch	Women's high diving	176.05	16	Did not advance	

== Swimming ==
Men

Athlete	Event	Heat		Semi-final		Final	
Athlete	Event	Time	Rank	Time	Rank	Time	Rank
Jonas Gaur	50 m breaststroke	27.49	28	Did not advance			
Jonas Gaur	100 m breaststroke	1:01.56	36	Did not advance			
Frederik Lentz	50 m freestyle	22.76	49	Did not advance			
Robert Pedersen	50 m backstroke	25.22	31	Did not advance			
Robert Pedersen	100 m backstroke	55.03	36	Did not advance			
Casper Puggaard	50 m butterfly	23.65	33	Did not advance			
Casper Puggaard	100 m butterfly	52.22	28	Did not advance			
Casper Puggaard	200 m butterfly	1:58.58	21	Did not advance			
Oliver Søgaard-Andersen	100 m freestyle	49.18	35	Did not advance			
Oliver Søgaard-Andersen	200 m freestyle	1:47.25	19	Did not advance			
Robert Pedersen; Jonas Gaur; Casper Puggaard; Frederik Lentz	4 × 100 m medley relay	3:36.73	20	—		Did not advance	

Women

Athlete	Event	Heat		Semi-final		Final	
Athlete	Event	Time	Rank	Time	Rank	Time	Rank
Helena Rosendahl Bach	100 m butterfly	58.15	15 Q	57.98	16	Did not advance	
Helena Rosendahl Bach	200 m butterfly	2:09.36	11 Q	2:07.92	7 Q	2:07.47	5
Elisabeth Ebbesen	100 m freestyle	54.96	26	Did not advance			
Elisabeth Ebbesen	200 m freestyle	2:00.36	29	Did not advance			
Elisabeth Ebbesen	50 m butterfly	26.73	31	Did not advance			
Julie Kepp Jensen	50 m freestyle	24.65	12 Q	24.77	15	Did not advance	
Julie Kepp Jensen	50 m backstroke	28.32	24	Did not advance			
Clara Rybak-Andersen	100 m breaststroke	1:08.39	31	Did not advance			
Clara Rybak-Andersen	200 m breaststroke	2:24.98	6 Q	2:24.10	8 Q	2:25.36	8
Clara Rybak-Andersen	200 m individual medley	2:12.74	20	Did not advance			
Schastine Tabor	100 m backstroke	1:01.83	27	Did not advance			
Julie Kepp Jensen; Elisabeth Ebbesen; Schastine Tabor; Helena Rosendahl Bach	4 × 100 m freestyle relay	3:40.66	11	—		Did not advance	
Schastine Tabor; Clara Rybak-Andersen; Helena Rosendahl Bach; Julie Kepp Jensen	4 × 100 m medley relay	4:01.70	13	—		Did not advance	

Mixed

Athlete	Event	Heat		Final	
Athlete	Event	Time	Rank	Time	Rank
Frederik Lentz; Oliver Søgaard-Andersen; Elisabeth Ebbesen; Schastine Tabor	4 × 100 m freestyle relay	3:27.74 NR	15	Did not advance	
