= Denmark at the 2017 World Aquatics Championships =

- Flag of Denmark
- World Aquatics code: DEN
- National federation: Danish Swimming Federation
- Website: svoem.org

in Budapest, Hungary
- Competitors: 15 in 1 sport
- Medals Ranked 26th: Gold 0 Silver 0 Bronze 1 Total 1

World Aquatics Championships appearances (overview)
- 1973; 1975; 1978; 1982; 1986; 1991; 1994; 1998; 2001; 2003; 2005; 2007; 2009; 2011; 2013; 2015; 2017; 2019; 2022; 2023; 2024; 2025

Denmark are set to compete at the 2017 World Aquatics Championships in Budapest, Hungary from 14 July to 30 July 2017.

== Medalists ==
Medal	Name	Sport	Event	Date
Bronze	Pernille Blume	Swimming	Women's 100 m freestyle	July 28

== Withdrawals ==
In March 2017, Jeanette Ottesen announced that she would not seek qualification for the Championships, as she would focus on the short course season in the fall, culminating in the European Championships on home soil. Later, Ottesen would go on to announce her pregnancy and a longer hiatus from swimming.

In April, Mie Nielsen withdrew after having met the qualification criteria for the 50 and 100 metres backstroke, citing a lack of motivation and fatigue following the previous summer's Olympics.

== Swimming ==
Danish swimmers have achieved qualifying standards in the following events (up to a maximum of 2 swimmers in each event at the A-standard entry time, and 1 at the B-standard):

Men

Athlete	Event	Heat		Semifinal		Final	
Athlete	Event	Time	Rank	Time	Rank	Time	Rank
Viktor Bromer	100 m butterfly	53.01	33	did not advance			
Viktor Bromer	200 m butterfly	1:55.13	3 Q	1:55.39	6 Q	1:55.30	7
Anton Ipsen	400 m freestyle	3:51.52	23	—N/a		did not advance	
Anton Ipsen	800 m freestyle	7:53.37	12	—N/a		did not advance	
Anton Ipsen	1500 m freestyle	15:10.02	20	—N/a		did not advance	
Anton Ipsen	400 m individual medley	4:20.74	24	—N/a		did not advance	
Anders Lie	100 m freestyle	49.71	38	did not advance			
Anders Lie	200 m freestyle	1:48.14	32	did not advance			
Daniel Skaaning	200 m individual medley	2:01.34	21	did not advance			
Marcus Kroyer; Anders Lie; Sebastian Ovesen; Daniel Skaaning	4 × 200 m freestyle relay	7:15.95	12	—N/a		did not advance	

Women

Athlete	Event	Heat		Semifinal		Final	
Athlete	Event	Time	Rank	Time	Rank	Time	Rank
Emilie Beckmann	50 m butterfly	25.88	11 Q	25.77	10	did not advance	
Emilie Beckmann	100 m butterfly	58.95	20	did not advance			
Signe Bro	100 m freestyle	55.40	23	did not advance			
Signe Bro	200 m freestyle	2:02.23	27	did not advance			
Pernille Blume	50 m freestyle	24.32	2 Q	24.05 NR	2 Q	24.00 NR	4
Pernille Blume	100 m freestyle	53.13 NR	2 Q	52.99 NR	4 Q	52.69 NR	3rd place, bronze medalist(s)
Marina Heller Hansen	400 m freestyle	4:18.86	23	—N/a		did not advance	
Maj Howardsen	200 m butterfly	2:13.88	28	did not advance			
Rikke Møller Pedersen	50 m breaststroke	31.29	17	did not advance			
Rikke Møller Pedersen	100 m breaststroke	1:07.39	14 Q	1:07.92	15	did not advance	
Rikke Møller Pedersen	200 m breaststroke	2:24.69	7 Q	2:24.51	11	did not advance	
Emilie Beckmann; Pernille Blume; Sarah Bro; Signe Bro	4 × 100 m freestyle relay	3:38.29	8 Q	—N/a		3:38.86	8
Sarah Bro; Signe Bro; Marina Heller Hansen; Anina Lund	4 × 200 m freestyle relay	8:06.67	10	—N/a		did not advance	

Mixed

Athlete	Event	Heat		Final	
Athlete	Event	Time	Rank	Time	Rank
Emilie Beckmann; Signe Bro; Anders Lie; Daniel Skaaning	4×100 m freestyle relay	3:30.13	10	did not advance	
