= Denmark at the 2015 World Aquatics Championships =

- Flag of Denmark
- FINA code: DEN
- National federation: Danish Swimming Federation
- Website: svoem.org

in Kazan, Russia
- Competitors: 11 in 1 sport
- Medals Ranked 18th: Gold 0 Silver 2 Bronze 2 Total 4

World Aquatics Championships appearances (overview)
- 1973; 1975; 1978; 1982; 1986; 1991; 1994; 1998; 2001; 2003; 2005; 2007; 2009; 2011; 2013; 2015; 2017; 2019; 2022; 2023; 2024

Denmark competed at the 2015 World Aquatics Championships in Kazan, Russia from 24 July to 9 August 2015.

== Medalists ==
Medal	Name	Sport	Event	Date
Silver	Jeanette Ottesen	Swimming	Women's 100 m butterfly	August 3
Silver	Jeanette Ottesen	Swimming	Women's 50 m butterfly	August 8
Bronze	Mie Ø. Nielsen	Swimming	Women's 100 m backstroke	August 4
Bronze	Rikke Møller Pedersen	Swimming	Women's 200 m breaststroke	August 7

== Swimming ==
Danish swimmers have achieved qualifying standards in the following events (up to a maximum of 2 swimmers in each event at the A-standard entry time, and 1 at the B-standard):

Eleven of these swimmers have been nominated to compete for Denmark at the World Championships, including current world record holder Rikke Møller Pedersen in the 200 m breaststroke, 2008 Olympic bronze medalist Lotte Friis in long-distance freestyle, and three-time Olympian and defending World champion Jeanette Ottesen in the 50 m butterfly.

Men

Athlete	Event	Heat		Semifinal		Final	
Athlete	Event	Time	Rank	Time	Rank	Time	Rank
Viktor Bromer	100 m butterfly	52.53	23	did not advance			
Viktor Bromer	200 m butterfly	1:54.47	2 Q	1:54.82	4 Q	1:54.66	5
Søren Dahl	50 m butterfly	24.13	=28	did not advance			
Mads Glæsner	400 m freestyle	3:48.78	17	—		did not advance	
Mads Glæsner	800 m freestyle	7:51.24	13	—		did not advance	
Anders Lie	200 m freestyle	1:48.27	23	did not advance			
Daniel Skaaning; Magnus Westermann; Søren Dahl; Anders Lie	4 × 200 m freestyle relay	7:13.72	12	—		did not advance	

Women

Athlete	Event	Heat		Semifinal		Final	
Athlete	Event	Time	Rank	Time	Rank	Time	Rank
Pernille Blume	50 m freestyle	25.14	15 Q	24.93	=13	did not advance	
Pernille Blume	100 m freestyle	54.72	15 Q	54.60	14	did not advance	
Lotte Friis	800 m freestyle	8:23.12	3 Q	—		8:21.36	5
Lotte Friis	1500 m freestyle	15:54.23	2 Q	—		15:49.00	4
Mie Ø. Nielsen	50 m backstroke	27.89	5 Q	27.63	3 Q	27.73	5
Mie Ø. Nielsen	100 m backstroke	59.40	4 Q	58.84	2 Q	58.86	3rd place, bronze medalist(s)
Jeanette Ottesen	50 m freestyle	24.66	5 Q	24.61	9	did not advance	
Jeanette Ottesen	50 m butterfly	25.51	2 Q	25.27	2 Q	25.34	2nd place, silver medalist(s)
Jeanette Ottesen	100 m butterfly	57.79	2 Q	57.04	2 Q	57.05	2nd place, silver medalist(s)
Rikke Møller Pedersen	50 m breaststroke	31.48	23	did not advance			
Rikke Møller Pedersen	100 m breaststroke	1:07.39	13 Q	1:07.42	12	did not advance	
Rikke Møller Pedersen	200 m breaststroke	2:23.90	6 Q	2:21.99	1 Q	2:22.76	3rd place, bronze medalist(s)
Pernille Blume; Mie Ø. Nielsen; Jeanette Ottesen; Rikke Møller Pedersen	4 × 100 m medley relay	3:58.38	5 Q	—		3:57.61	5
