= Swimming at the 2015 World Aquatics Championships – Women's 50 metre freestyle =

Women's 50 metre freestyle at the 2015 World Aquatics Championships
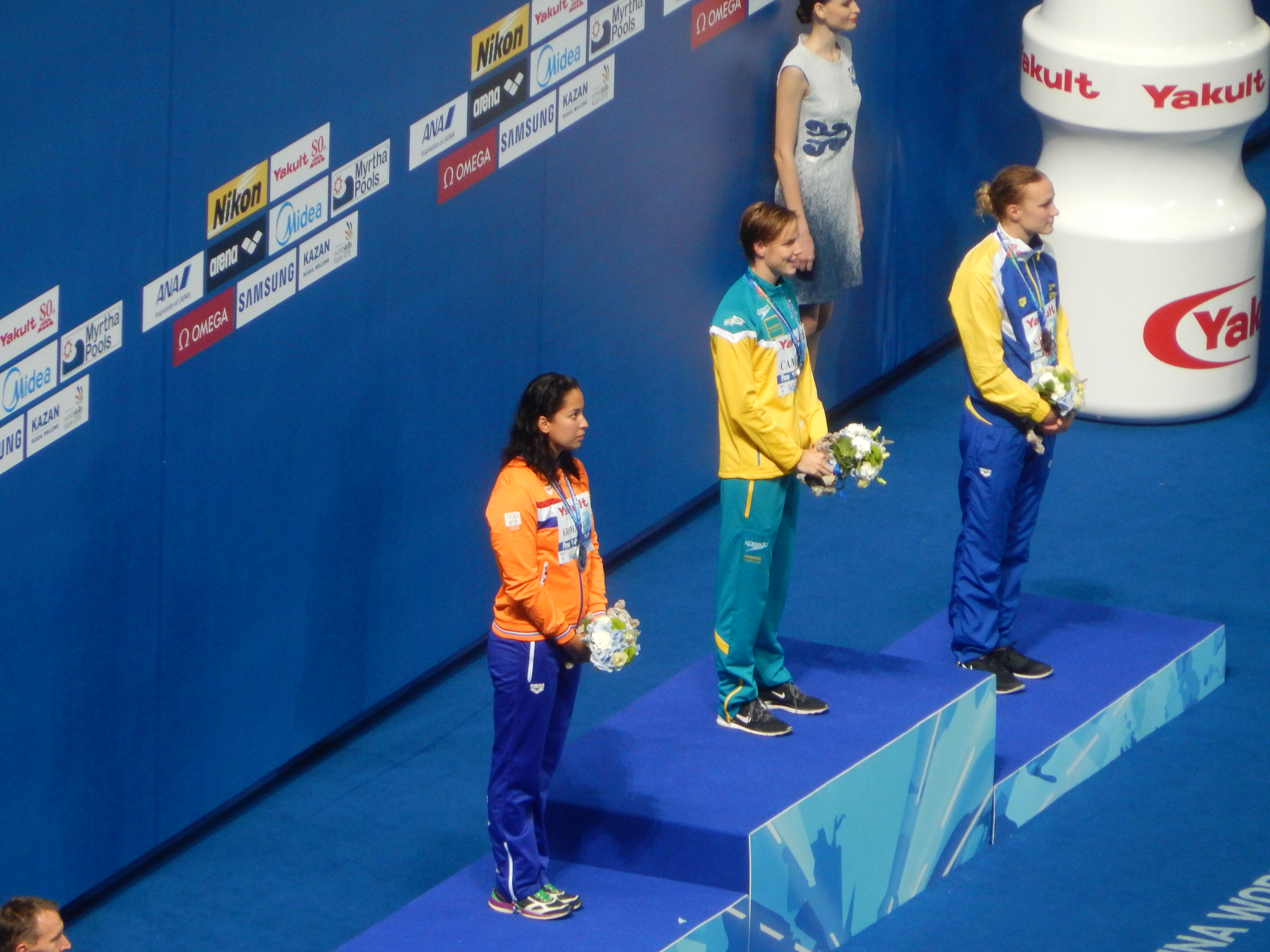
- Victory Ceremony
- Dates: 8 August (heats and semifinals); 9 August (final)
- Competitors: 115 from 102 nations
- Winning time: 24.12

Medalists
| gold medal | Bronte Campbell | Australia |
| silver medal | Ranomi Kromowidjojo | Netherlands |
| bronze medal | Sarah Sjöström | Sweden |

The Women's 50 metre freestyle competition of the swimming events at the 2015 World Aquatics Championships was held on 8 August with the heats and the semifinals and 9 August with the final.

== Records ==
Prior to the competition, the existing world and championship records were as follows.

| World record | Britta Steffen (GER) | 23.73 | Rome, Italy | 2 August 2009 |
| Competition record | Britta Steffen (GER) | 23.73 | Rome, Italy | 2 August 2009 |

== Results ==
=== Heats ===
The heats were held on 8 August at 09:30.

| Rank | Heat | Lane | Name | Nationality | Time | Notes |
|---|---|---|---|---|---|---|
| 1 | 12 | 4 | Cate Campbell | Australia | 24.40 | Q |
| 2 | 10 | 5 | Arianna Vanderpool-Wallace | Bahamas | 24.43 | Q |
| 3 | 10 | 4 | Sarah Sjöström | Sweden | 24.53 | Q |
| 4 | 11 | 5 | Ranomi Kromowidjojo | Netherlands | 24.62 | Q |
| 5 | 12 | 3 | Jeanette Ottesen | Denmark | 24.66 | Q |
| 6 | 10 | 6 | Dorothea Brandt | Germany | 24.71 | Q |
| 7 | 12 | 5 | Bronte Campbell | Australia | 24.74 | Q |
| 8 | 11 | 4 | Francesca Halsall | Great Britain | 24.80 | Q |
| 9 | 12 | 8 | Liu Xiang | China | 24.82 | Q |
| 10 | 12 | 7 | Anna Santamans | France | 24.90 | Q |
| 11 | 10 | 3 | Simone Manuel | United States | 24.91 | Q |
| 12 | 11 | 2 | Chantal van Landeghem | Canada | 24.94 | Q |
| 13 | 11 | 3 | Etiene Medeiros | Brazil | 24.97 | Q |
| 14 | 11 | 8 | Michelle Williams | Canada | 25.13 | Q |
| 15 | 11 | 6 | Pernille Blume | Denmark | 25.14 | Q |
| 16 | 10 | 8 | Maria Kameneva | Russia | 25.18 | Q |
| 17 | 10 | 0 | Zhu Menghui | China | 25.19 | |
| 18 | 10 | 2 | Aliaksandra Herasimenia | Belarus | 25.20 | |
| 19 | 9 | 2 | Theodora Drakou | Greece | 25.22 | |
| 19 | 12 | 1 | Farida Osman | Egypt | 25.22 | |
| 21 | 10 | 7 | Graciele Herrmann | Brazil | 25.25 | |
| 22 | 10 | 1 | Miki Uchida | Japan | 25.33 | |
| 23 | 11 | 7 | Silvia Di Pietro | Italy | 25.34 | |
| 24 | 11 | 9 | Anna Dowgiert | Poland | 25.44 | |
| 24 | 12 | 0 | Erika Ferraioli | Italy | 25.44 | |
| 26 | 9 | 5 | Sasha Touretski | Switzerland | 25.49 | |
| 26 | 12 | 2 | Ivy Martin | United States | 25.49 | |
| 28 | 9 | 4 | Lauren Quigley | Great Britain | 25.53 | |
| 29 | 9 | 1 | Cecilie Johannessen | Norway | 25.55 | |
| 29 | 9 | 0 | Julie Meynen | Luxembourg | 25.55 | |
| 31 | 8 | 6 | Miroslava Syllabová | Slovakia | 25.59 | |
| 32 | 12 | 9 | Birgit Koschischek | Austria | 25.61 | |
| 33 | 11 | 1 | Nataliya Lovtsova | Russia | 25.62 | |
| 34 | 8 | 5 | Anna Kolářová | Czech Republic | 25.67 | |
| 35 | 9 | 3 | Zsuzsanna Jakabos | Hungary | 25.79 | |
| 36 | 8 | 4 | Isabella Arcila | Colombia | 25.83 | |
| 37 | 9 | 8 | Siobhán Haughey | Hong Kong | 25.85 | |
| 38 | 10 | 9 | Yayoi Matsumoto | Japan | 25.90 | |
| 39 | 7 | 5 | Nina Rangelova | Bulgaria | 25.94 | |
| 39 | 7 | 3 | Sanja Jovanović | Croatia | 25.94 | |
| 41 | 8 | 2 | Arlene Semeco | Venezuela | 25.98 | |
| 42 | 8 | 3 | Nastja Govejšek | Slovenia | 26.00 | |
| 43 | 8 | 9 | Jenjira Srisa-Ard | Thailand | 26.11 | |
| 44 | 8 | 0 | Chui Lai Kwan | Malaysia | 26.13 | |
| 45 | 8 | 8 | Jasmine Alkhaldi | Philippines | 26.15 | |
| 46 | 8 | 1 | Chinyere Pigot | Suriname | 26.18 | |
| 47 | 9 | 7 | Zohar Shikler | Israel | 26.19 | |
| 48 | 9 | 6 | Tessa Nurminen | Finland | 26.23 | |
| 49 | 8 | 7 | Tess Grossmann | Estonia | 26.31 | |
| 50 | 7 | 6 | Bryndís Hansen | Iceland | 26.33 | |
| 51 | 7 | 4 | Allyson Ponson | Aruba | 26.40 | |
| 52 | 7 | 7 | Karen Torrez | Bolivia | 26.41 | |
| 53 | 9 | 9 | Quah Ting Wen | Singapore | 26.51 | |
| 54 | 6 | 4 | Bayan Jumah | Syria | 26.81 | |
| 55 | 6 | 3 | Dorian McMenemy | Dominican Republic | 26.87 | |
| 56 | 7 | 2 | Miroslava Najdanovski | Serbia | 26.89 | |
| 57 | 7 | 0 | Rebecca Heyliger | Bermuda | 26.90 | |
| 58 | 5 | 3 | Jade Howard | Zambia | 26.99 | |
| 59 | 7 | 1 | Nicola Muscat | Malta | 27.10 | |
| 60 | 6 | 2 | Tracy Keith-Matchitt | Cook Islands | 27.16 | |
| 61 | 6 | 0 | Astrið Foldarskarð | Faroe Islands | 27.24 | |
| 62 | 5 | 4 | Jovana Terzić | Montenegro | 27.44 | |
| 63 | 6 | 5 | Machiko Raheem | FINA Independent Athletes | 27.49 | |
| 64 | 6 | 6 | Faye Sultan | Kuwait | 27.63 | |
| 64 | 6 | 1 | Karen Riveros | Paraguay | 27.63 | |
| 64 | 7 | 8 | Monika Vasilyan | Armenia | 27.63 | |
| 67 | 6 | 8 | Shivani Kataria | India | 27.65 | |
| 68 | 6 | 7 | Jennifer Rizkallah | Lebanon | 27.76 | |
| 69 | 5 | 5 | Sofia Usher | Uruguay | 27.93 | |
| 70 | 4 | 3 | Su Moe San | Myanmar | 27.98 | |
| 71 | 5 | 2 | Nadia Cubells | Andorra | 28.00 | |
| 72 | 5 | 6 | Long Chi Wai | Macau | 28.02 | |
| 72 | 5 | 7 | Ana Nóbrega | Angola | 28.02 | |
| 74 | 4 | 5 | Tiara Anwar | Brunei | 28.10 | |
| 75 | 6 | 9 | Beatrice Felici | San Marino | 28.15 | |
| 76 | 4 | 7 | Amarah Phillip | British Virgin Islands | 28.35 | |
| 77 | 5 | 1 | Noura Mana | Morocco | 28.45 | |
| 78 | 5 | 0 | Fatima Alkaramova | Azerbaijan | 28.50 | |
| 79 | 4 | 8 | Ann-Marie Hepler | Marshall Islands | 28.52 | |
| 80 | 4 | 2 | Jamila Sanmoogan | Guyana | 28.60 | |
| 81 | 4 | 6 | Lianna Swan | Pakistan | 28.66 | |
| 82 | 4 | 1 | Irene Prescott | Tonga | 28.74 | |
| 83 | 5 | 9 | Hannah Gill | Barbados | 28.75 | |
| 84 | 4 | 4 | Barbara Vali-Skelton | Papua New Guinea | 28.78 | |
| 85 | 5 | 8 | Sofia Shah | Nepal | 29.43 | |
| 86 | 3 | 3 | Magdalena Moshi | Tanzania | 29.62 | |
| 87 | 3 | 6 | Awa Ly N'diaye | Senegal | 29.78 | |
| 88 | 3 | 2 | Yesui Bayar | Mongolia | 29.90 | |
| 89 | 3 | 4 | Flaka Pruthi | Kosovo | 30.16 | |
| 90 | 4 | 0 | Merjen Saryyeva | Turkmenistan | 30.17 | |
| 91 | 3 | 7 | Zahra Pinto | Malawi | 30.20 | |
| 92 | 3 | 0 | Miri Alatrash | Palestine | 30.25 | |
| 93 | 2 | 7 | Debra Daniel | Federated States of Micronesia | 30.48 | |
| 94 | 3 | 8 | Angel de Jesús | Northern Mariana Islands | 30.57 | |
| 95 | 2 | 4 | Hemthon Vitiny | Cambodia | 30.67 | |
| 96 | 3 | 1 | Angelika Ouedraogo | Burkina Faso | 30.74 | |
| 97 | 4 | 9 | Roylin Akiwo | Palau | 30.86 | |
| 98 | 2 | 3 | Sonia Aktar | Bangladesh | 30.89 | |
| 99 | 3 | 9 | Rahel Gebresilassie | Ethiopia | 32.49 | |
| 100 | 3 | 5 | Fatoumata Samassékou | Mali | 32.79 | |
| 101 | 1 | 5 | Siri Budcharern | Laos | 33.71 | |
| 102 | 2 | 2 | Elsie Uwamahoro | Burundi | 34.08 | |
| 103 | 2 | 5 | Adzo Kpossi | Togo | 34.46 | |
| 104 | 1 | 9 | Bellore Sangala | Congo | 35.74 | |
| 105 | 1 | 6 | Alzain Tareq | Bahrain | 35.78 | |
| 106 | 1 | 3 | Haneen Ibrahim | Sudan | 36.14 | |
| 107 | 2 | 1 | Nazlati Mohamed Andhumdine | Comoros | 37.64 | |
| 108 | 1 | 4 | Laraïba Seibou | Benin | 37.67 | |
| 109 | 1 | 2 | Roukaya Mahamane | Niger | 38.98 | |
| 110 | 1 | 7 | Natasha Addai | Ghana | 41.71 | |
| 111 | 1 | 1 | Mariama Sow | Guinea | 44.59 | |
| 112 | 2 | 8 | Chloe Sauvourel | Central African Republic | 46.55 | |
| 113 | 1 | 8 | Bunturabie Jalloh | Sierra Leone | 54.27 | |
| | 2 | 6 | Anastasiya Tyurina | Tajikistan | | DSQ |
| | 7 | 9 | Talita Baqlah | Jordan | | DSQ |
| | 2 | 0 | Teona Bostashvili | Georgia | | DNS |
| | 2 | 9 | Liza Kafack | Cameroon | | DNS |
| | 11 | 0 | Michelle Coleman | Sweden | | DNS |
| | 12 | 6 | Femke Heemskerk | Netherlands | | DNS |

=== Semifinals ===
The semifinals were held on 8 August at 18:28.

==== Semifinal 1 ====
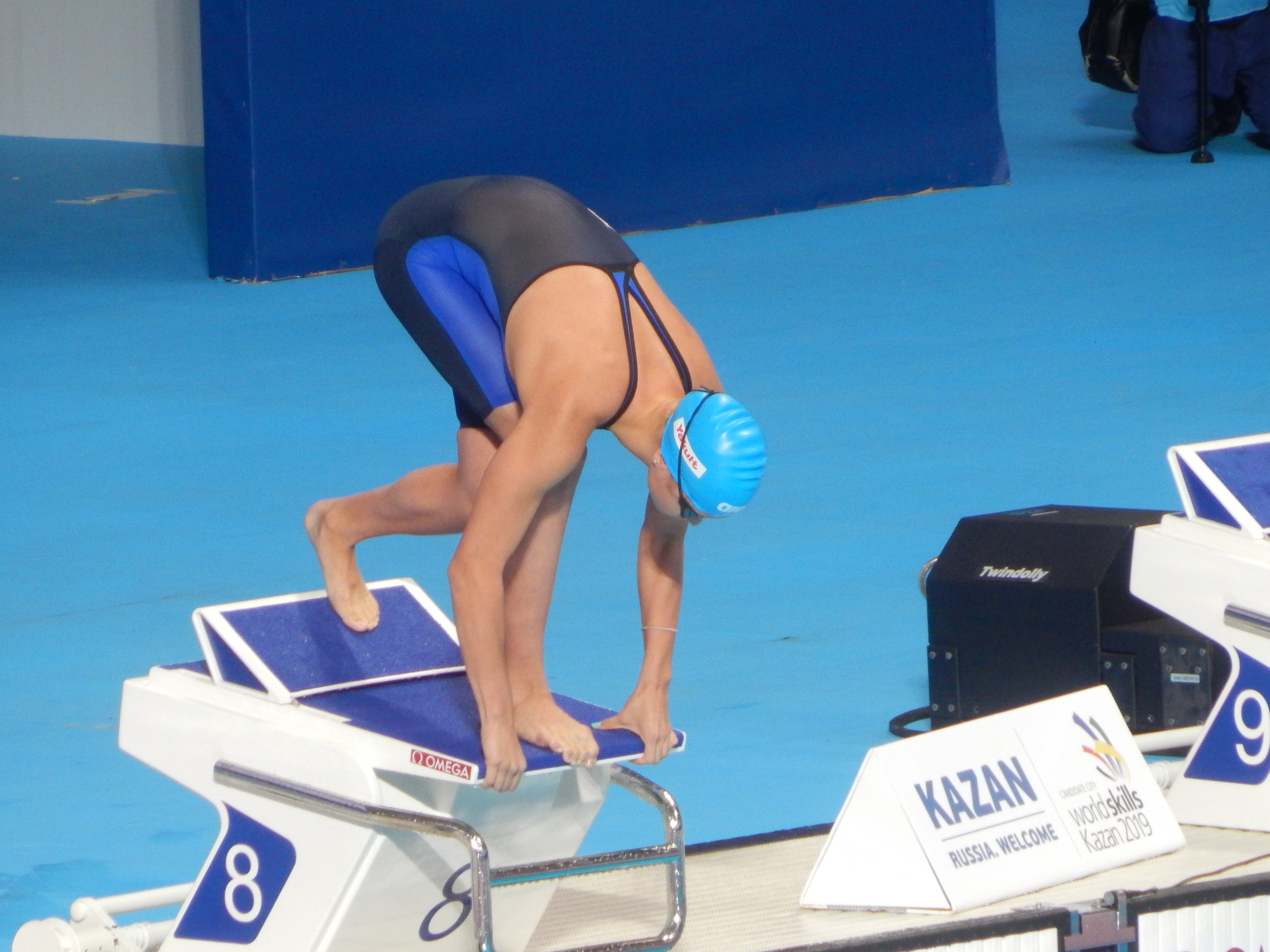
Kameneva from Russia at the start

| Rank | Lane | Name | Nationality | Time | Notes |
|---|---|---|---|---|---|
| 1 | 5 | Ranomi Kromowidjojo | Netherlands | 24.23 | Q |
| 2 | 4 | Arianna Vanderpool-Wallace | Bahamas | 24.38 | Q |
| 3 | 6 | Francesca Halsall | Great Britain | 24.50 | Q |
| 4 | 7 | Chantal van Landeghem | Canada | 24.52 | Q, NR |
| 5 | 3 | Dorothea Brandt | Germany | 24.75 | |
| 6 | 1 | Michelle Williams | Canada | 24.84 | |
| 7 | 2 | Anna Santamans | France | 24.93 | |
| 8 | 8 | Maria Kameneva | Russia | 24.97 | |

==== Semifinal 2 ====
| Rank | Lane | Name | Nationality | Time | Notes |
|---|---|---|---|---|---|
| 1 | 4 | Cate Campbell | Australia | 24.22 | Q |
| 2 | 5 | Sarah Sjöström | Sweden | 24.31 | Q |
| 3 | 6 | Bronte Campbell | Australia | 24.32 | Q |
| 4 | 7 | Simone Manuel | United States | 24.47 | Q |
| 5 | 3 | Jeanette Ottesen | Denmark | 24.61 | |
| 6 | 2 | Liu Xiang | China | 24.78 | |
| 7 | 8 | Pernille Blume | Denmark | 24.93 | |
| 8 | 1 | Etiene Medeiros | Brazil | 25.03 | |

=== Final ===
The final was held on 9 August at 18:05.

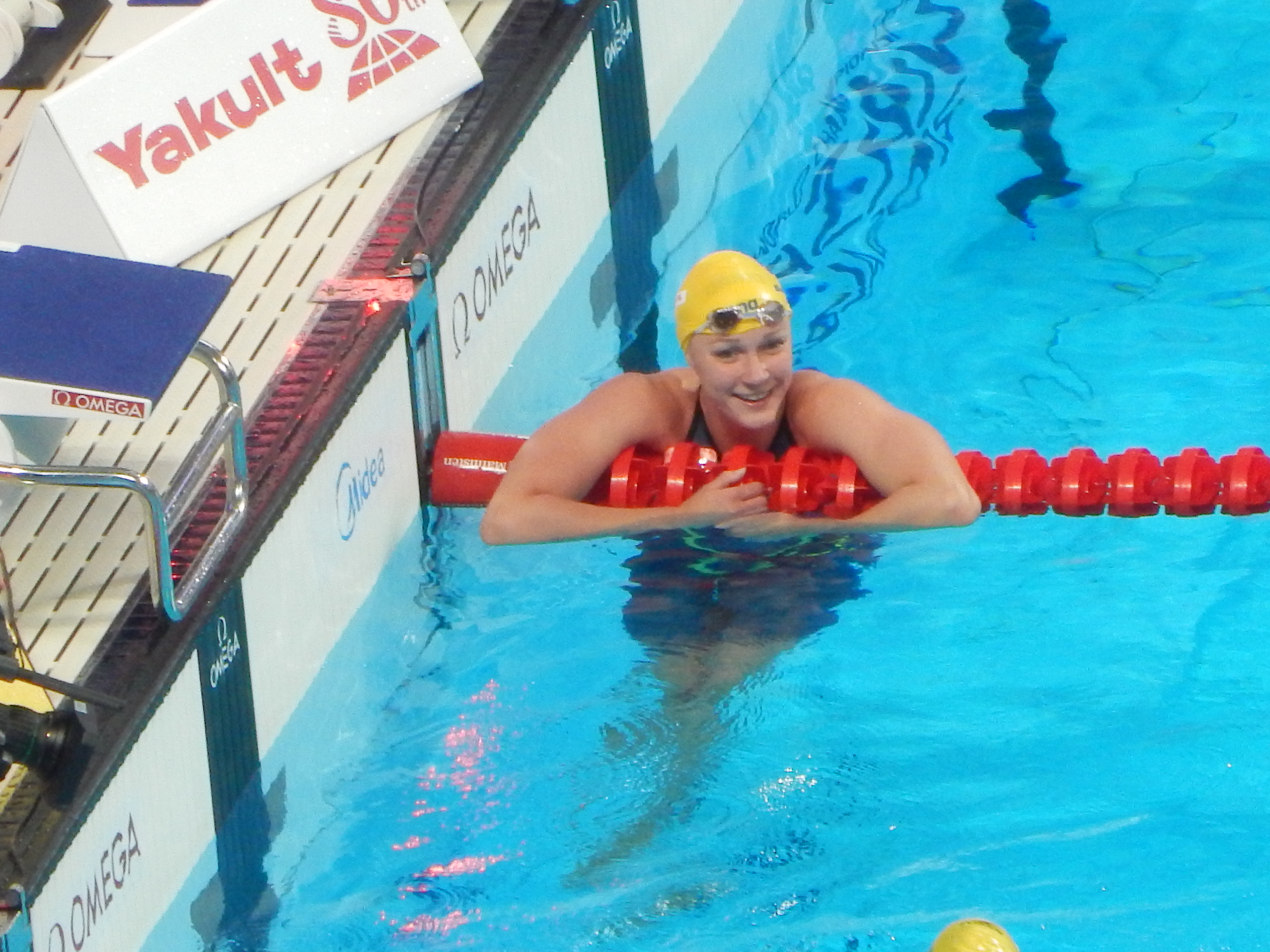
Sjöström wins her fifth medal in Kazan

| Rank | Lane | Name | Nationality | Time | Notes |
|---|---|---|---|---|---|
| 1st place, gold medalist(s) | 6 | Bronte Campbell | Australia | 24.12 | |
| 2nd place, silver medalist(s) | 5 | Ranomi Kromowidjojo | Netherlands | 24.22 | |
| 3rd place, bronze medalist(s) | 3 | Sarah Sjöström | Sweden | 24.31 | |
| 4 | 4 | Cate Campbell | Australia | 24.36 | |
| 5 | 8 | Chantal van Landeghem | Canada | 24.39 | NR |
| 6 | 2 | Arianna Vanderpool-Wallace | Bahamas | 24.44 | |
| 7 | 1 | Francesca Halsall | Great Britain | 24.51 | |
| 8 | 7 | Simone Manuel | United States | 24.57 | |
