= Denmark at the World Aquatics Championships =

- Flag of Denmark
- World Aquatics code: DEN
- National federation: Danish Swimming Federation
- Website: svoem.org
- Medals: Gold 4 Silver 8 Bronze 8 Total 20

World Aquatics Championships appearances (overview)
- 1973; 1975; 1978; 1982; 1986; 1991; 1994; 1998; 2001; 2003; 2005; 2007; 2009; 2011; 2013; 2015; 2017; 2019; 2022; 2023; 2024; 2025

Denmark first participated at the FINA World Aquatics Championships at the third championships in 1978 when it was held in West Berlin, and has participated in every championships since then.

== Medalists ==
Lotte Friis is the most winning Danish swimmer at the Championships, with two gold medals and four silver medals. Nine women and two men from Denmark have received at least one medal, all won in the swimming events.

Medal	Name	Championships	Sport	Event
Gold	Lotte Friis	2009 Rome	Swimming	Women's 800 m freestyle
Gold	Lotte Friis	2011 Shanghai	Swimming	Women's 1500 m freestyle
Gold (Note: Shared with Aleksandra Gerasimenya of Belarus)	Jeanette Ottesen	2011 Shanghai	Swimming	Women's 100 m freestyle
Gold	Jeanette Ottesen Gray	2013 Barcelona	Swimming	Women's 50 m butterfly
Silver (Note: Shared with Katy Sexton of Great Britain)	Louise Ørnstedt	2003 Barcelona	Swimming	Women's 100 m backstroke
Silver	Lotte Friis	2009 Rome	Swimming	Women's 1500 m freestyle
Silver	Lotte Friis	2011 Shanghai	Swimming	Women's 800 m freestyle
Silver	Lotte Friis	2013 Barcelona	Swimming	Women's 1500 m freestyle
Silver	Rikke Møller Pedersen	2013 Barcelona	Swimming	Women's 200 m breaststroke
Silver	Lotte Friis	2013 Barcelona	Swimming	Women's 800 m freestyle
Silver	Jeanette Ottesen	2015 Kazan	Swimming	Women's 100 m butterfly
Silver	Jeanette Ottesen	2015 Kazan	Swimming	Women's 50 m butterfly
Bronze	Susanne Nielsson	1978 West Berlin	Swimming	Women's 200 m breaststroke
Bronze	Benny Nielsen	1986 Madrid	Swimming	Men's 200 m butterfly
Bronze	Gitta Jensen, Berit Puggaard, Annette Poulsen, Mette Jacobsen	1991 Perth	Swimming	Women's 4 × 200 m freestyle
Bronze	Mette Jacobsen	1991 Perth	Swimming	Women's 200 m freestyle
Bronze	Jakob Andkjær	2007 Melbourne	Swimming	Men's 50 m butterfly
Bronze	Mie Nielsen	2015 Kazan	Swimming	Women's 100 m backstroke
Bronze (Note: Shared with Jessica Vall of Spain and Shi Jinglin of China)	Rikke Møller Pedersen	2015 Kazan	Swimming	Women's 200 m breaststroke
Bronze	Pernille Blume	2017 Budapest	Swimming	Women's 50 m freestyle

== Medals by championships ==
The most successful championships for Denmark by gold medal count was the 2011 championships, while the most total medals were achieved in 2013 and 2015.

Championships	Athletes	Gold	Silver	Bronze	Total	Rank (Note: Ranked by gold medals)
1978 West Berlin	11	0	0	1	1	15
1982 Guayaquil	5	0	0	0	0	–
1986 Madrid	7	0	0	1	1	19
1991 Perth	8	0	0	2	2	17
1994 Rome	4	0	0	0	0	–
1998 Perth	10	0	0	0	0	–
2001 Fukuoka	6	0	0	0	0	–
2003 Barcelona	3	0	1	0	1	20
2005 Montreal	8	0	0	0	0	–
2007 Melbourne	11	0	0	1	1	23
2009 Rome	12	1	1	0	2	15
2011 Shanghai	6	2	1	0	3	11
2013 Barcelona	4	1	3	0	4	12
2015 Kazan	11	0	2	2	4	18
2017 Budapest	11	0	0	1	1	26
Total (Note: After 2017 Championships)		4	8	8	20	23
