= Denmark at the 2013 World Aquatics Championships =

- Flag of Denmark
- FINA code: DEN
- National federation: Danish Swimming Federation
- Website: svoem.org

in Barcelona, Spain
- Competitors: 4 in 1 sports
- Medals Ranked 12th: Gold 1 Silver 3 Bronze 0 Total 4

World Aquatics Championships appearances (overview)
- 1973; 1975; 1978; 1982; 1986; 1991; 1994; 1998; 2001; 2003; 2005; 2007; 2009; 2011; 2013; 2015; 2017; 2019; 2022; 2023; 2024

Denmark competed at the 2013 World Aquatics Championships in Barcelona, Spain between 19 July to 4 August 2013.

== Medalists ==
Medal	Name	Sport	Event	Date
Gold	Jeanette Ottesen	Swimming	Women's 50 m butterfly	3 August
Silver	Lotte Friis	Swimming	Women's 1500 m freestyle	30 July
Silver	Rikke Møller Pedersen	Swimming	Women's 200 metre breaststroke	2 August
Silver	Lotte Friis	Swimming	Women's 800 m freestyle	3 August

== Swimming ==
Jeanette Ottesen got the Danes' sole gold at the championships in the 50 m butterfly, while Rikke Møller Pedersen set a new world record in the 200 m breaststroke, the first Danish long course world record in 61 years, in the semi-final with 2:19.11. She went on to win silver in the final, her first medal at the World Aquatics Championships. In addition, Lotte Friis set a new European record in the 1500 m freestyle. She would go on to win silver in both the 800 and 1500 m freestyle events.

In total, seven Danish records were broken during the championships, and three new Nordic records were set, by Møller Pedersen (100 m and 200 m breaststroke; she beat the former distance's record twice) and Friis (1500 m freestyle).

Danish swimmers earned qualifying standards in the following events (up to a maximum of 2 swimmers in each event at the A-standard entry time, and 1 at the B-standard):

Women

Athlete	Event	Heat		Semifinal		Final	
Athlete	Event	Time	Rank	Time	Rank	Time	Rank
Pernille Blume	50 m freestyle	25.23	16 Q	25.01	10	Did not advance	
Pernille Blume	100 m freestyle	54.88	14 Q	54.68	13	Did not advance	
Lotte Friis	400 m freestyle	DNS		—		Did not advance	
Lotte Friis	800 m freestyle	8:23.00	3 Q	—		8:16.32	2nd place, silver medalist(s)
Lotte Friis	1500 m freestyle	15:49.18	1 Q	—		15:38.88 EU	2nd place, silver medalist(s)
Jeanette Ottesen	50 m freestyle	25.04	12 Q	24.54 NR	3 Q	24.66	=5
Jeanette Ottesen	100 m freestyle	DNS		Did not advance			
Jeanette Ottesen	50 m butterfly	25.69	=1 Q	25.50	1 Q	25.24 NR	1st place, gold medalist(s)
Jeanette Ottesen	100 m butterfly	57.79	5 Q	57.19 NR	2 Q	57.27	4
Rikke Møller Pedersen	50 m breaststroke	31.23	12 Q	30.57 NR	6 Q	30.72	6
Rikke Møller Pedersen	100 m breaststroke	1:06.30	4 Q	1:05.99 NR	3 Q	1:05.93 NR	4
Rikke Møller Pedersen	200 m breaststroke	2:22.20	2 Q	2:19.11 WR	1 Q	2:20.08	2nd place, silver medalist(s)
