= Denmark at the 2019 World Aquatics Championships =

- Flag of Denmark
- FINA code: DEN
- National federation: Danish Swimming Federation
- Website: svoem.org

in Gwangju, South Korea
- Medals: Gold 0 Silver 0 Bronze 0 Total 0

World Aquatics Championships appearances (overview)
- 1973; 1975; 1978; 1982; 1986; 1991; 1994; 1998; 2001; 2003; 2005; 2007; 2009; 2011; 2013; 2015; 2017; 2019; 2022; 2023; 2024

Denmark competed at the 2019 World Aquatics Championships in Gwangju, South Korea from 12 to 28 July.

== Swimming ==
Denmark entered 12 swimmers.

Men

| Athlete | Event | Heat | | Semifinal | | Final | |
| Athlete | Event | Time | Rank | Time | Rank | Time | Rank |
|---|---|---|---|---|---|---|---|
| Tobias Bjerg | 50 m freestyle | 23.06 | =52 | Did not advance | | | |
| Tobias Bjerg | 50 m breaststroke | 27.13 | 13 Q | 27.08; SO: 27.16 | 9 | Did not advance | |
| Tobias Bjerg | 100 m breaststroke | 1:00.29 | 23 | Did not advance | | | |
| Viktor Bromer | 100 m butterfly | DNS | | Did not advance | | | |
| Viktor Bromer | 200 m butterfly | 1:58.59 | 26 | Did not advance | | | |
| Anton Ipsen | 400 m freestyle | 3:48.50 | 12 | — | | Did not advance | |
| Anton Ipsen | 800 m freestyle | 7:48.74 | 9 | — | | Did not advance | |
| Anton Ipsen | 1500 m freestyle | 15:04.02 | 15 | — | | Did not advance | |
| Alexander Norgaard | 1500 m freestyle | 14:47.75 | 4 Q | — | | 15:20.47 | 8 |

Women

| Athlete | Event | Heat | | Semifinal | | Final | |
| Athlete | Event | Time | Rank | Time | Rank | Time | Rank |
|---|---|---|---|---|---|---|---|
| Emilie Beckmann | 50 m butterfly | 26.32; SO: 26.24 | 17 | Did not advance | | | |
| Emilie Beckmann | 100 m butterfly | 59.94 | 28 | Did not advance | | | |
| Pernille Blume | 50 m freestyle | 24.44 | =4 Q | 24.14 | 3 Q | 24.12 | 4 |
| Signe Bro | 100 m freestyle | 55.65 | 33 | Did not advance | | | |
| Emily Gantriis | 200 m freestyle | 2:05.44 | 37 | Did not advance | | | |
| Julie Kepp Jensen | 50 m freestyle | 25.02 | 15 Q | 24.89 | 13 | Did not advance | |
| Julie Kepp Jensen | 50 m backstroke | 27.95 | 5 Q | 28.24 | 16 | Did not advance | |
| Mie Nielsen | 50 m backstroke | DNS | | Did not advance | | | |
| Mie Nielsen | 100 m backstroke | 1:00.99 | 19 | Did not advance | | | |
| Jeanette Ottesen | 50 m butterfly | 26.09 | 9 Q | 26.01 | 8 Q | 25.76 | 7 |
| Matilde Schroder | 50 m breaststroke | 31.98 | 27 | Did not advance | | | |
| Matilde Schroder | 100 m breaststroke | 1:09.62 | 29 | Did not advance | | | |
| Julie Kepp Jensen; Signe Bro; Jeanette Ottesen; Emily Gantriis | 4×100 m freestyle relay | 3:42.20 | 14 | — | | Did not advance | |
| Mie Nielsen; Matilde Schroder; Jeanette Ottesen; Julie Kepp Jensen | 4×100 m medley relay | 4:04.33 | 16 | — | | Did not advance | |

Mixed

| Athlete | Event | Heat | | Final | |
| Athlete | Event | Time | Rank | Time | Rank |
|---|---|---|---|---|---|
| Mie Nielsen; Tobias Bjerg; Viktor Bromer; Signe Bro | 4×100 m medley relay | 3:49.10 | 14 | Did not advance | |
