= Denmark at the 2022 World Aquatics Championships =

- Flag of Denmark
- World Aquatics code: DEN
- National federation: Danish Swimming Federation
- Website: svoem.org

in Budapest, Hungary
- Competitors: 5 in 1 sport
- Medals: Gold 0 Silver 0 Bronze 0 Total 0

World Aquatics Championships appearances (overview)
- 1973; 1975; 1978; 1982; 1986; 1991; 1994; 1998; 2001; 2003; 2005; 2007; 2009; 2011; 2013; 2015; 2017; 2019; 2022; 2023; 2024; 2025

Denmark competed at the 2022 World Aquatics Championships in Budapest, Hungary from 17 June to 3 July.

== Swimming ==
Denmark entered 5 swimmers.

Men

Athlete	Event	Heat		Semifinal		Final	
Athlete	Event	Time	Rank	Time	Rank	Time	Rank
Rasmus Nickelsen	50 m butterfly	23.54	18	did not advance			
Rasmus Nickelsen	100 m butterfly	52.54	21	did not advance			

Women

Athlete	Event	Heat		Semifinal		Final	
Athlete	Event	Time	Rank	Time	Rank	Time	Rank
Helena Rosendahl Bach	400 m freestyle	4:13.36	21	—N/a		did not advance	
Helena Rosendahl Bach	200 m butterfly	2:09.24	=7 Q	2:07.82	7 Q	2:08.12	=7
Emilie Beckmann	50 m butterfly	26.69	21	did not advance			
Signe Bro	100 m freestyle	54.61	17	did not advance			
Julie Kepp Jensen	50 m freestyle	25.04	=9 Q	24.86	8 Q	24.96	8
Julie Kepp Jensen	50 m backstroke	28.50	18	did not advance			
Julie Kepp Jensen	50 m butterfly	26.45	14 Q	26.32	=14	did not advance	
