= Denmark at the 2023 World Aquatics Championships =

- Flag of Denmark
- FINA code: DEN
- National federation: Danish Swimming Union

in Fukuoka, Japan
- Competitors: 6 in 2 sports
- Medals: Gold 0 Silver 0 Bronze 0 Total 0

World Aquatics Championships appearances (overview)
- 1973; 1975; 1978; 1982; 1986; 1991; 1994; 1998; 2001; 2003; 2005; 2007; 2009; 2011; 2013; 2015; 2017; 2019; 2022; 2023; 2024

Denmark is set to compete at the 2023 World Aquatics Championships in Fukuoka, Japan from 14 to 30 July.

== High diving ==
Athlete	Event	Points	Rank
Annika Bornebusch	Women's high diving	188.10	20

== Swimming ==
Denmark entered 5 swimmers.

Women

Athlete	Event	Heat		Semifinal		Final	
Athlete	Event	Time	Rank	Time	Rank	Time	Rank
Helena Rosendahl Bach	100 metre butterfly	58.55	15 Q	58.54	16	Did not advance	
Helena Rosendahl Bach	200 metre butterfly	2:07.57	1 Q	2:07.15	5 Q	2:07.15	5
Emilie Beckmann	50 metre butterfly	26.43	21	Did not advance			
Thea Blomsterberg	100 metre breaststroke	1:08.08	26	Did not advance			
Thea Blomsterberg	200 metre breaststroke	2:23.41	3 Q	2:23.19	5 Q	2:22.42	5
Signe Bro	100 metre freestyle	54.61	15 Q	53.94	11	Did not advance	
Signe Bro	200 metre freestyle	1:59.33	25	Did not advance			
Julie Kepp Jensen	50 metre freestyle	24.79	10 Q	24.70	10	Did not advance	
Julie Kepp Jensen	50 metre backstroke	28.77	30	Did not advance			
Julie Kepp Jensen	50 metre butterfly	26.36	20	Did not advance			
Signe Bro; Julie Kepp Jensen; Emilie Beckmann; Helena Rosendahl Bach	4 × 100 m freestyle relay	3:41.21	14	—		Did not advance	
Julie Kepp Jensen; Thea Blomsterberg; Helena Rosendahl Bach; Signe Bro	4 × 100 m medley relay	4:03.33	14	—		Did not advance	
