= Swimming at the 2015 World Aquatics Championships – Women's 100 metre backstroke =

Women's 100 metre backstroke at the 2015 World Aquatics Championships
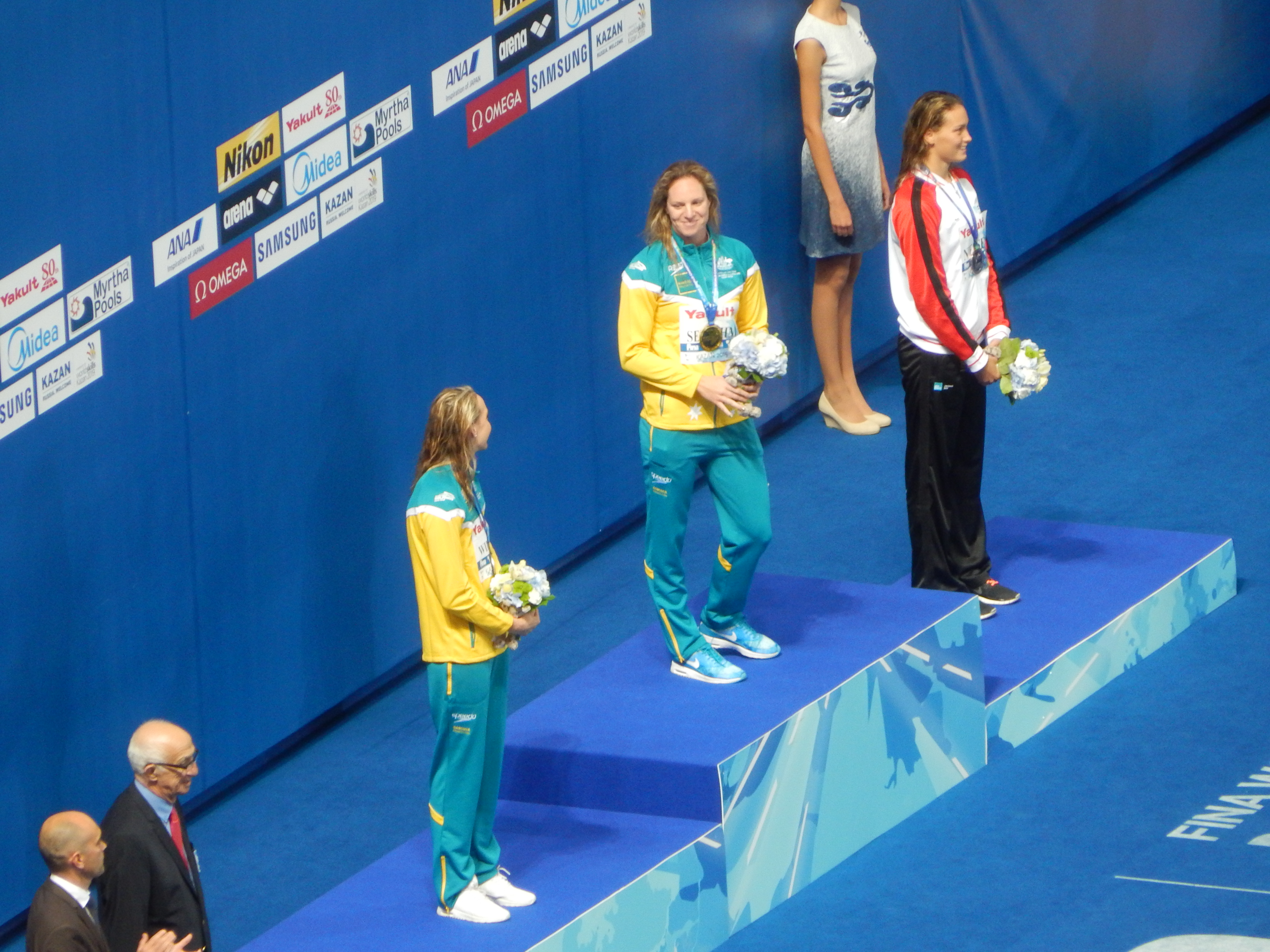
- Victory Ceremony
- Dates: 3 August (heats and semifinals); 4 August (final)
- Competitors: 66 from 56 nations
- Winning time: 58.26

Medalists
gold medal	Emily Seebohm	Australia
silver medal	Madison Wilson	Australia
bronze medal	Mie Nielsen	Denmark

The Women's 100 metre backstroke competition of the swimming events at the 2015 World Aquatics Championships was held on 3 August with the heats and the semifinals and 4 August with the final.

== Records ==
Prior to the competition, the existing world and championship records were as follows.

World record	Gemma Spofforth (GBR)	58.12	Rome, Italy	28 July 2009
Competition record	Gemma Spofforth (GBR)	58.12	Rome, Italy	28 July 2009

== Results ==
=== Heats ===
The heats were held on 3 August at 09:30.

Rank	Heat	Lane	Name	Nationality	Time	Notes
1	5	5	Katinka Hosszú	Hungary	58.78	Q, WD, NR
2	7	4	Emily Seebohm	Australia	59.04	Q
3	6	4	Madison Wilson	Australia	59.17	Q
4	5	4	Mie Nielsen	Denmark	59.40	Q
5	7	5	Missy Franklin	United States	59.59	Q
6	5	1	Anastasia Fesikova	Russia	59.84	Q
7	5	6	Lauren Quigley	Great Britain	1:00.14	Q
7	6	8	Kirsty Coventry	Zimbabwe	1:00.14	Q
9	5	0	Eygló Ósk Gústafsdóttir	Iceland	1:00.25	Q, NR
10	7	3	Etiene Medeiros	Brazil	1:00.33	Q
11	6	6	Elizabeth Simmonds	Great Britain	1:00.38	Q
12	4	3	Michelle Coleman	Sweden	1:00.55	Q, WD
12	6	5	Fu Yuanhui	China	1:00.55	Q
14	6	3	Chen Jie	China	1:00.58	Q
15	4	8	Alicja Tchórz	Poland	1:00.61	Q, NR
15	7	2	Dominique Bouchard	Canada	1:00.61	Q
17	7	6	Kathleen Baker	United States	1:00.62	Q
18	5	7	Hilary Caldwell	Canada	1:00.69	Q
19	4	6	Lisa Graf	Germany	1:00.71	
20	7	7	Simona Baumrtová	Czech Republic	1:00.91	
21	6	7	Jenny Mensing	Germany	1:00.97	
22	5	3	Daria Ustinova	Russia	1:01.00	
23	5	8	Mimosa Jallow	Finland	1:01.10	NR
23	6	2	Elena Gemo	Italy	1:01.10	
25	3	5	Theodora Drakou	Greece	1:01.15	NR
26	4	1	Bobbie Gichard	New Zealand	1:01.26	
27	3	4	Stephanie Au	Hong Kong	1:01.41	
28	7	9	Katarína Listopadová	Slovakia	1:01.61	
29	7	8	Yekaterina Rudenko	Kazakhstan	1:01.62	
29	7	0	Sayaka Akase	Japan	1:01.62	
31	6	1	Duane Da Rocha	Spain	1:01.63	
32	5	2	Daryna Zevina	Ukraine	1:01.68	
33	4	5	Mathilde Cini	France	1:01.77	
34	7	1	Béryl Gastaldello	France	1:01.91	
35	6	9	Gisela Morales	Guatemala	1:02.09	
36	4	9	Park Han-byeol	South Korea	1:02.12	
37	6	0	Margherita Panziera	Italy	1:02.17	
38	4	4	Andrea Berrino	Argentina	1:02.37	
39	3	7	Yulduz Kuchkarova	Uzbekistan	1:02.80	
40	3	6	Ekaterina Avramova	Turkey	1:02.81	
41	3	2	Jördis Steinegger	Austria	1:02.99	
42	4	0	Carolina Colorado Henao	Colombia	1:03.26	
43	5	9	Maaike de Waard	Netherlands	1:03.81	
44	3	3	Matea Samardžić	Croatia	1:04.07	
45	3	8	Zanre Oberholzer	Namibia	1:04.09	
46	2	4	Karen Vilorio	Honduras	1:04.54	
47	2	5	Inés Remersaro	Uruguay	1:04.73	
48	3	9	Jessika Cossa	Mozambique	1:04.96	
49	2	3	Kimiko Raheem	FINA Independent Athletes	1:05.61	
50	4	7	Lourdes Villasenor	Mexico	1:05.76	
51	3	0	Roxanne Yu	Philippines	1:06.10	
52	2	6	Heather Arseth	Mauritius	1:06.25	
53	3	1	Anak Ratih	Indonesia	1:06.34	
54	2	1	Lara Butler	Cayman Islands	1:06.71	
55	4	2	Andrea García	Mexico	1:06.77	
56	2	7	Talisa Lanoe	Kenya	1:07.05	
57	2	2	Caylee Watson	Virgin Islands	1:07.34	
58	1	4	Gaurika Singh	Nepal	1:08.12	
59	2	8	Evelina Afoa	Samoa	1:08.43	
60	2	0	Noura Mana	Morocco	1:10.79	
61	2	9	Ani Poghosyan	Armenia	1:10.82	
62	1	5	Enkhkhuslen Batbayar	Mongolia	1:13.52	
63	1	3	Flaka Pruthi	Kosovo	1:14.29	
64	1	6	Awa Ly N'diaye	Senegal	1:16.27	
65	1	2	Roylin Akiwo	Palau	1:20.72	
66	1	7	Nada Al-Bedwawi	United Arab Emirates	1:35.83	

=== Semifinals ===
The semifinals were held on 3 August at 18:24.

==== Semifinal 1 ====
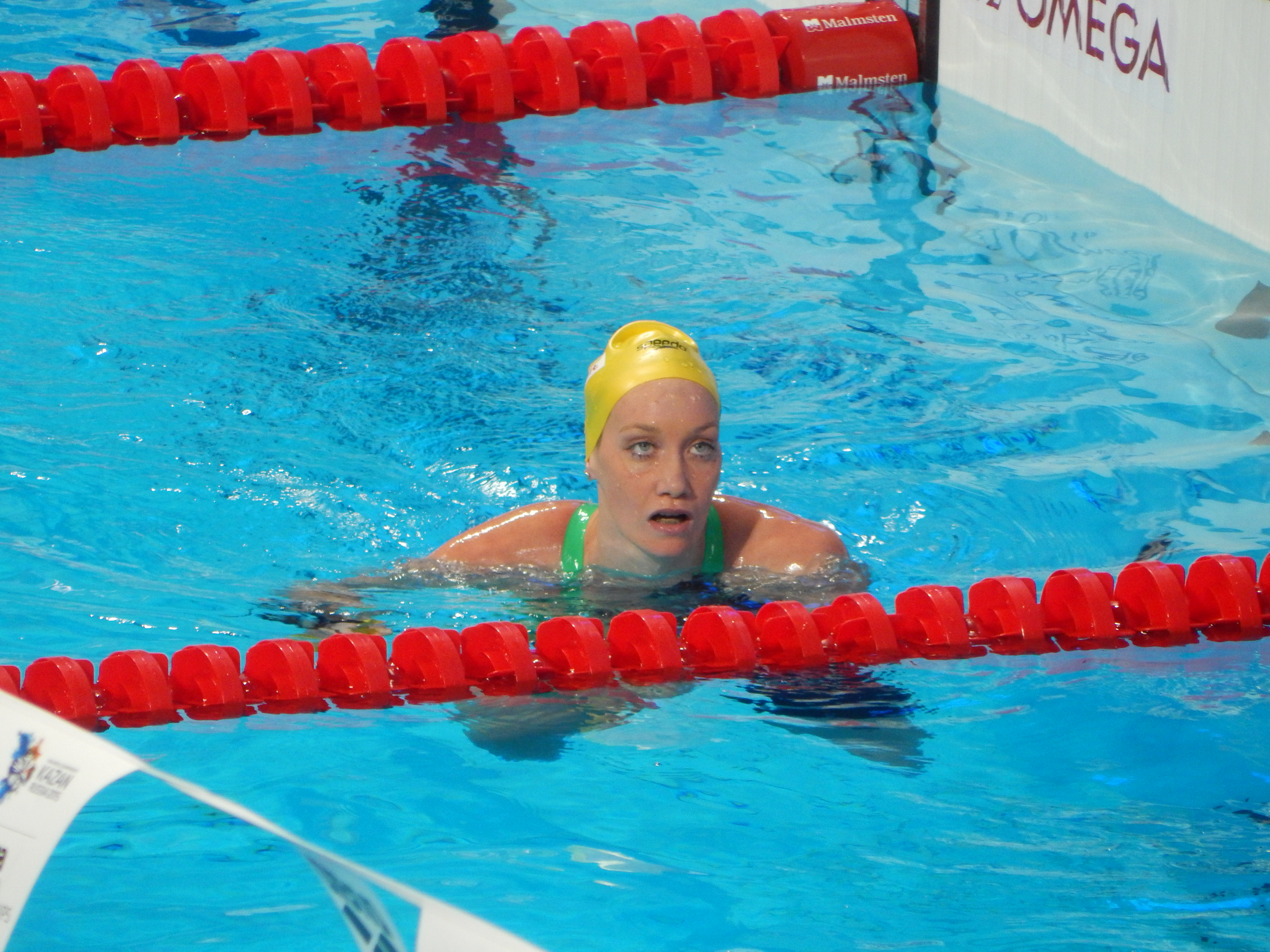
Wilson wins the first semi

Rank	Lane	Name	Nationality	Time	Notes
1	4	Madison Wilson	Australia	59.05	Q
2	5	Missy Franklin	United States	59.42	Q
3	3	Lauren Quigley	Great Britain	59.71	Q
4	1	Dominique Bouchard	Canada	1:00.31	
5	8	Hilary Caldwell	Canada	1:00.39	
6	2	Elizabeth Simmonds	Great Britain	1:00.40	
7	7	Chen Jie	China	1:00.42	
8	6	Eygló Ósk Gústafsdóttir	Iceland	1:00.69	

==== Semifinal 2 ====
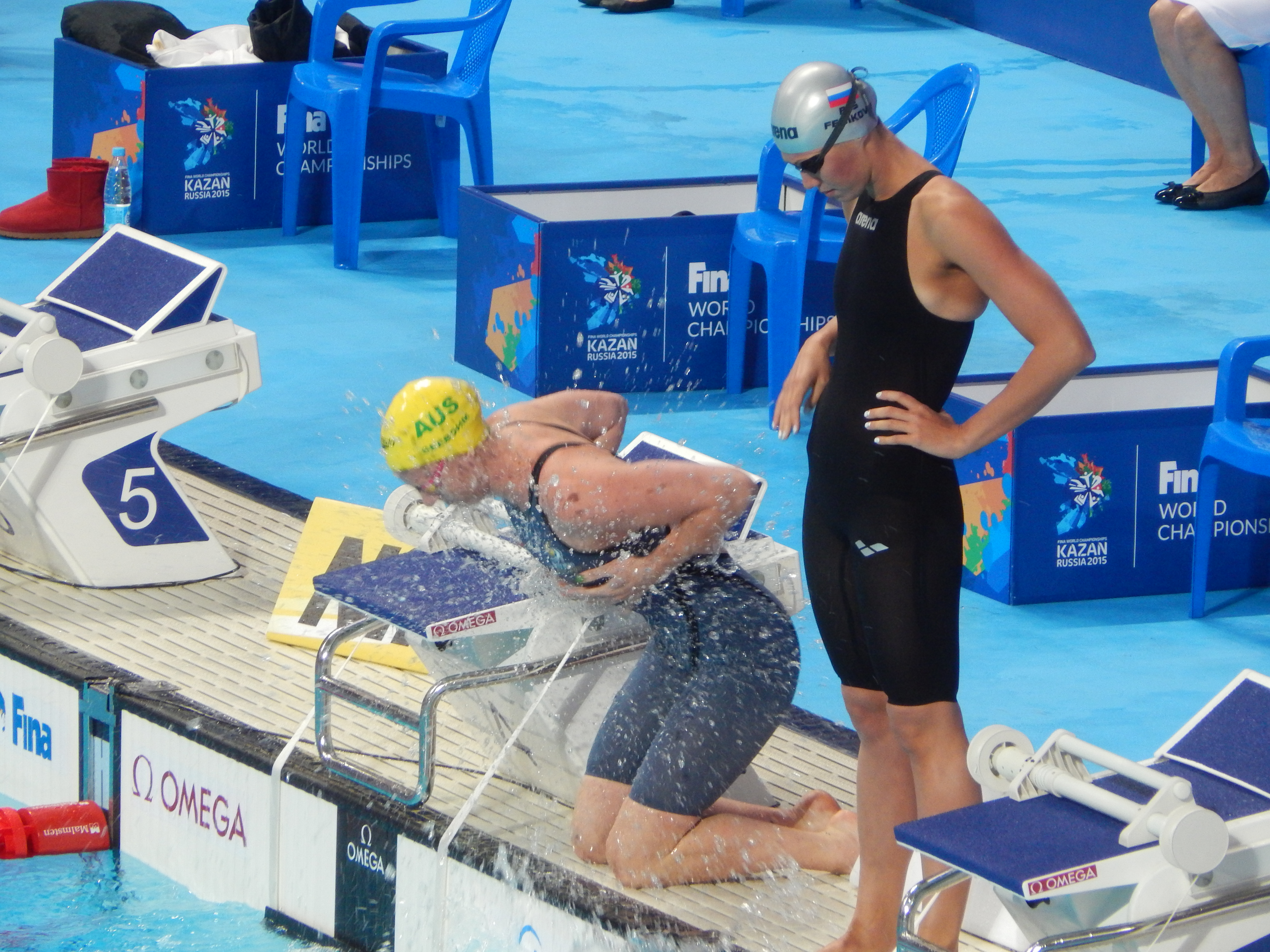
Seebohm and Fesikova before the second semifinal

Rank	Lane	Name	Nationality	Time	Notes
1	4	Emily Seebohm	Australia	58.56	Q
2	5	Mie Nielsen	Denmark	58.84	Q, NR
3	7	Fu Yuanhui	China	59.33	Q
4	3	Anastasia Fesikova	Russia	59.55	Q
5	8	Kathleen Baker	United States	59.63	Q
6	2	Etiene Medeiros	Brazil	59.97	
7	6	Kirsty Coventry	Zimbabwe	1:00.09	
8	1	Alicja Tchórz	Poland	1:01.09	

=== Final ===
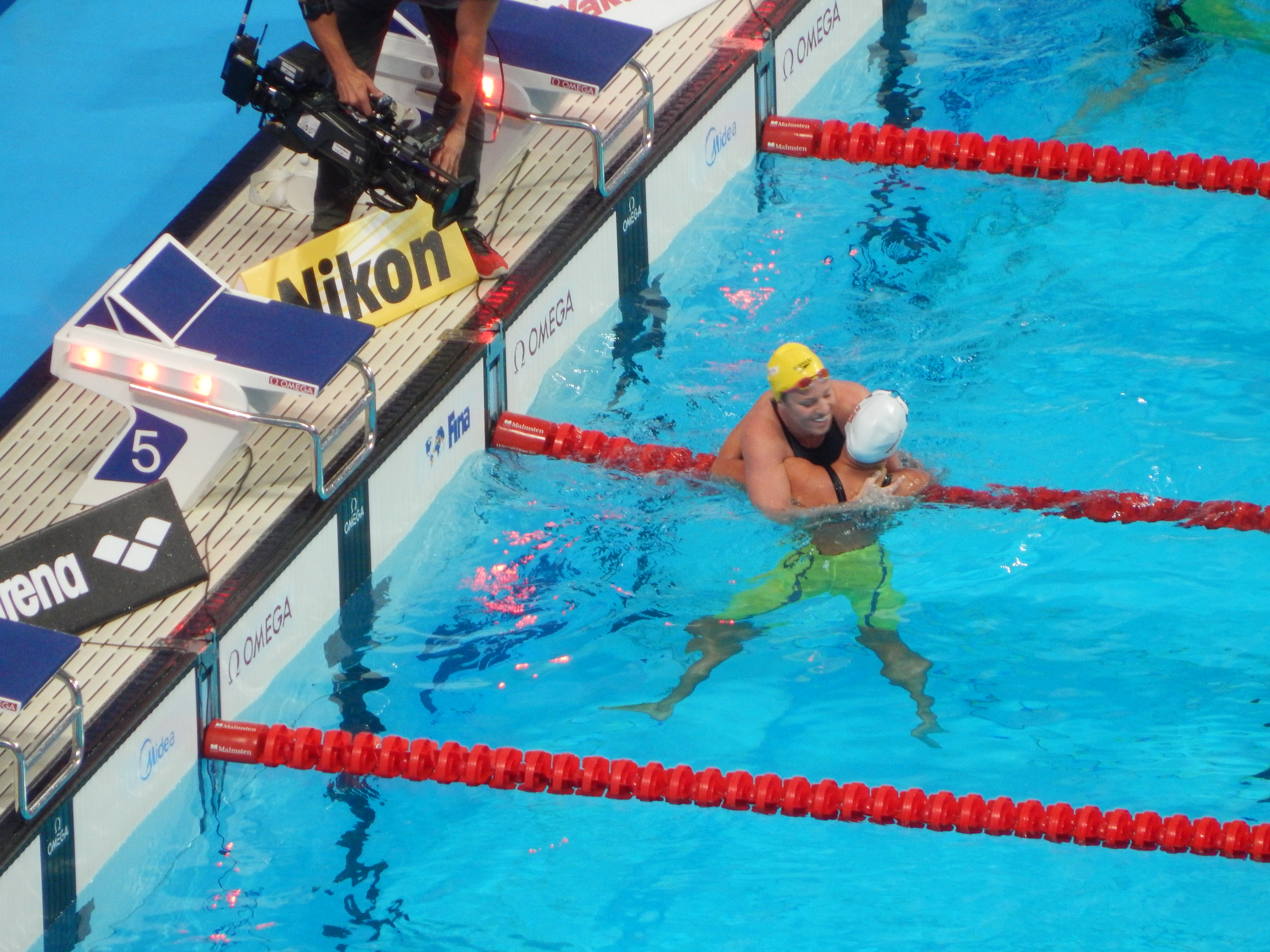
Nielsen and Seebohm after finish

The final was held on 4 August at 17:40.

Rank	Lane	Name	Nationality	Time	Notes
1st place, gold medalist(s)	4	Emily Seebohm	Australia	58.26	
2nd place, silver medalist(s)	3	Madison Wilson	Australia	58.75	
3rd place, bronze medalist(s)	5	Mie Nielsen	Denmark	58.86	
4	6	Fu Yuanhui	China	59.02	
5	2	Missy Franklin	United States	59.40	
6	7	Anastasia Fesikova	Russia	59.66	
7	8	Lauren Quigley	Great Britain	59.78	
8	1	Kathleen Baker	United States	59.99	
