= Swimming at the 2017 World Aquatics Championships – Women's 100 metre freestyle =

Women's 100 metre freestyle at the 2017 World Aquatics Championships
- Venue: Danube Arena
- Location: Budapest, Hungary
- Dates: 27 July (heats and semifinals); 28 July (final)
- Competitors: 78 from 71 nations
- Winning time: 52.27

Medalists
gold medal	Simone Manuel	United States
silver medal	Sarah Sjöström	Sweden
bronze medal	Pernille Blume	Denmark

The Women's 100 metre freestyle competition at the 2017 World Championships was held on 27 and 28 July 2017.

== Records ==
Prior to the competition, the existing world and championship records were as follows.

World record	Cate Campbell (AUS)	52.06	Brisbane, Australia	2 July 2016
Competition record	Britta Steffen (GER)	52.07	Rome, Italy	31 July 2009

During the competition, prior to this 100 metre event, on 23 July 2017, Sarah Sjöström set a new world record in the 4 × 100 metre freestyle relay final; her mark was at 51.71.

Date	Event	Name	Nationality	Time	Record
23 July	Women's 4 × 100 m freestyle relay final	Sarah Sjöström	Sweden	51.71	WR, CR

== Results ==
=== Heats ===
The heats were held on 27 July at 09:30.

Rank	Heat	Lane	Name	Nationality	Time	Notes
1	8	4	Sarah Sjöström	Sweden	53.01	Q
2	7	6	Pernille Blume	Denmark	53.13	Q, NR
3	6	4	Simone Manuel	United States	53.17	Q
4	8	5	Penny Oleksiak	Canada	53.18	Q
5	6	5	Mallory Comerford	United States	53.42	Q
6	8	3	Ranomi Kromowidjojo	Netherlands	53.45	Q
7	7	5	Emma McKeon	Australia	53.47	Q
8	7	4	Bronte Campbell	Australia	53.56	Q
9	7	3	Federica Pellegrini	Italy	53.92	Q
10	6	6	Charlotte Bonnet	France	54.00	Q
10	8	6	Zhu Menghui	China	54.00	Q
12	7	2	Sandrine Mainville	Canada	54.22	Q
13	6	3	Michelle Coleman	Sweden	54.23	Q
14	8	7	Freya Anderson	Great Britain	54.25	Q
15	6	1	Siobhan Haughey	Hong Kong	54.45	Q
16	6	7	Maud van der Meer	Netherlands	54.49	QSO
16	8	1	Andrea Murez	Israel	54.49	QSO
18	7	7	Ai Yanhan	China	54.54	
19	6	2	Silvia di Pietro	Italy	54.74	
20	7	1	Maria Ugolkova	Switzerland	54.81	
21	8	2	Rikako Ikee	Japan	54.91	
22	8	8	Manuella Lyrio	Brazil	55.32	
23	6	8	Signe Bro	Denmark	55.40	
24	5	5	Erin Gallagher	South Africa	55.46	
25	8	9	Farida Osman	Egypt	55.52	
26	7	9	Anna Kolářová	Czech Republic	55.73	
27	7	0	Yuliya Khitraya	Belarus	55.77	
28	6	9	Fanni Gyurinovics	Hungary	55.86	
29	8	0	Julie Meynen	Luxembourg	55.99	
30	5	7	Bryndis Hansen	Iceland	56.11	
31	5	6	Lotta Nevalainen	Finland	56.31	
32	7	8	Rozaliya Nasretdinova	Russia	56.34	
33	6	0	Susann Bjørnsen	Norway	56.56	
33	4	4	Anastasia Bogdanovski	North Macedonia	56.56	
35	5	3	Gabrielle Fa'amausili	New Zealand	56.60	
36	5	2	Jasmine Alkhaldi	Philippines	56.70	
37	5	8	Gabriela Ņikitina	Latvia	56.77	
38	5	1	McKenna DeBever	Peru	56.95	
39	4	5	Karen Torrez	Bolivia	57.28	
40	5	4	Liliana Ibáñez	Mexico	57.40	
41	4	6	Julimar Avila	Honduras	57.82	
42	5	9	Felicity Passon	Seychelles	57.99	
43	4	2	Inés Remersaro	Uruguay	58.27	
44	4	3	Kimiko Raheem	Sri Lanka	58.35	
45	4	1	Matelita Buadromo	Fiji	58.53	
46	1	3	Elodie Poo-cheong	Mauritius	58.76	
47	5	0	Allyson Ponson	Aruba	58.81	
48	3	4	Mónica Ramírez	Andorra	58.85	=NR
49	4	9	Arianna Sanna	Dominican Republic	59.03	
50	3	2	Devyn Leask	Zimbabwe	59.08	
50	4	7	Bayan Jumah	Syria	59.08	
52	1	2	Ani Poghosyan	Armenia	59.27	
53	3	3	Talita Baqlah	Jordan	59.33	
54	4	8	Catharine Cooper	Panama	59.37	
55	3	1	Tan Chi Yan	Macau	59.38	
56	4	0	Gabriela Santis	Guatemala	59.54	
57	3	5	Jovana Terzić	Montenegro	59.86	
58	3	8	Nikol Merizaj	Albania	1:00.04	
59	3	9	Lani Cabrera	Barbados	1:00.75	
60	2	1	Sonia Tumiotto	Tanzania	1:09.00	
61	3	6	Ana Sofia Nóbrega	Angola	1:00.92	
61	1	6	Batbayaryn Enkhkhuslen	Mongolia	1:00.92	
63	1	4	Gabriela Hernandez	Nicaragua	1:01.15	
64	3	0	Jeanne Boutbien	Senegal	1:01.30	
65	1	8	Park Mi-song	North Korea	1:02.24	
66	2	5	Mikaili Charlemagne	Saint Lucia	1:02.59	
67	2	4	Flaka Pruthi	Kosovo	1:03.81	
68	2	3	Ann-Marie Hepler	Marshall Islands	1:04.01	
69	2	8	Sofia Shah	Nepal	1:04.83	
70	2	6	Bianca Mitchell	Antigua and Barbuda	1:05.06	
71	2	2	Mineri Gomez	Guam	1:05.09	
72	2	7	Charissa Panuve	Tonga	1:05.47	
73	2	0	Anastasiya Tyurina	Tajikistan	1:09.14	
74	1	1	Aminath Shajan	Maldives	1:10.17	
75	2	9	Tayamika Chang'anamuno	Malawi	1:10.84	
76	1	5	Jin Ju Thompson	Northern Mariana Islands	1:12.07	
77	1	7	Lidwine Uwase	Rwanda	1:16.00	
78	1	0	Imelda Ximenes Belo	Timor-Leste	1:19.52	
—	1	9	Lena Irankunda	Burundi	DNS	

=== Swim-off ===
The swim-off was held on 27 July at 10:58.

Rank	Lane	Name	Nationality	Time	Notes
1	5	Andrea Murez	Israel	54.20	Q, NR
2	4	Maud van der Meer	Netherlands	54.49	

=== Semifinals ===
The semifinals were held on 27 July at 17:41.

==== Semifinal 1 ====
Rank	Lane	Name	Nationality	Time	Notes
1	4	Pernille Blume	Denmark	52.99	Q, NR
2	6	Bronte Campbell	Australia	53.04	Q
3	5	Penny Oleksiak	Canada	53.05	Q
4	3	Ranomi Kromowidjojo	Netherlands	53.09	Q
5	2	Charlotte Bonnet	France	53.77	
6	1	Freya Anderson	Great Britain	53.91	
7	7	Sandrine Mainville	Canada	54.01	
8	8	Andrea Murez	Israel	54.62	

==== Semifinal 2 ====
Rank	Lane	Name	Nationality	Time	Notes
1	4	Sarah Sjöström	Sweden	52.44	Q
2	5	Simone Manuel	United States	52.69	Q
3	3	Mallory Comerford	United States	52.85	Q
4	6	Emma McKeon	Australia	53.20	Q
5	1	Michelle Coleman	Sweden	53.51	
6	7	Zhu Menghui	China	53.85	
7	8	Siobhán Haughey	Hong Kong	54.05	
8	2	Federica Pellegrini	Italy	54.26	

=== Final ===
The final was held on 28 July at 17:32.

Rank	Lane	Name	Nationality	Time	Notes
1st place, gold medalist(s)	5	Simone Manuel	United States	52.27	AM
2nd place, silver medalist(s)	4	Sarah Sjöström	Sweden	52.31	
3rd place, bronze medalist(s)	6	Pernille Blume	Denmark	52.69	NR
4	3	Mallory Comerford	United States	52.77	
5	1	Ranomi Kromowidjojo	Netherlands	52.78	
6	7	Penny Oleksiak	Canada	52.94	
7	2	Bronte Campbell	Australia	53.18	
8	8	Emma McKeon	Australia	53.21	
