= List of Danish records in swimming =

This is a list of Danish records in swimming, which are ratified by the Danish Swimming Federation. All records were achieved in finals unless otherwise noted.

== Long course (50 m) ==
=== Men ===
| Event | Time | | Name | Club | Date | Meet | Location | Ref |
|---|---|---|---|---|---|---|---|---|
| 50 m freestyle | 22.34 | | Robert Falborg Pedersen | Gladsaxe | 16 April 2026 | Danish Championships | Bellahøj, Denmark | |
| 50 m freestyle | 22.27 | tt, not ratified | Frederik Riedel Lentz | Gladsaxe | 27 September 2021 | Internt stævne | Søborg, Denmark | |
| 100 m freestyle | 48.50 | sf | Oliver Søgaard-Andersen | Denmark | 11 August 2026 | European Championships | Paris, France | |
| 200 m freestyle | 1:46.94 | r | Mads Glæsner | Allerød SK | 9 April 2009 | Danish Championships | Esbjerg, Denmark | |
| 400 m freestyle | 3:44.40 | NR | Mads Glæsner | Denmark | 26 July 2009 | World Championships | Rome, Italy | |
| 800 m freestyle | 7:48.74 | h | Anton Ipsen | Denmark | 23 July 2019 | World Championships | Gwangju, South Korea | |
| 1500 m freestyle | 14:47.75 | h | Alexander Nørgaard | Denmark | 27 July 2019 | World Championships | Gwangju, South Korea | |
| 50m backstroke | 24.55 | h, NR | Robert Falborg Pedersen | Denmark | 13 August 2026 | European Championships | Paris, France | |
| 100m backstroke | 53.61 | r, NR | Robert Falborg Pedersen | Denmark | 16 August 2026 | European Championships | Paris, France | |
| 200m backstroke | 1:59.58 | | Alexander Gliese | Sigma Swim Birkerød | 8 April 2019 | Danish Open | Taastrup, Denmark | |
| 50m breaststroke | 27.08 | sf | Tobias Bjerg | Denmark | 23 July 2019 | World Championships | Gwangju, South Korea | |
| 100m breaststroke | 59.17 | h | Tobias Bjerg | Agfs | 8 April 2019 | Danish Open | Taastrup, Denmark | |
| 200m breaststroke | 2:11.41 | h | Chris Boe Christensen | Denmark | 30 July 2009 | World Championships | Rome, Italy | |
| 50m butterfly | 22.93 | NR | Jakob Andkjær | Denmark | 27 July 2009 | World Championships | Rome, Italy | |
| 100m butterfly | 51.50 | NR | Casper Puggaard | Hovedstaden | 14 July 2024 | Danish Championships | Herning, Denmark | |
| 200m butterfly | 1:54.47 | NR | Viktor Bromer | Denmark | 4 August 2015 | World Championships | Kazan, Russia | |
| 200m individual medley | 2:00.69 | | Daniel Skaaning | Denmark | 15 April 2019 | Swim Open Stockholm | Stockholm, Sweden | |
| 400m individual medley | 4:16.34 | | Anton Ipsen | Sigma Swim Birkerød | 7 April 2019 | Danish Open | Taastrup, Denmark | |
| 4×100m freestyle relay | 3:17.70 | h | Frederik Riedel Lentz (49.26); Oliver Sogaard (48.83); William Textor (50.48); Rasmus Nickelsen (49.13) | Denmark | 20 June 2024 | European Championships | Belgrade, Serbia | |
| 4×200m freestyle relay | 7:12.66 | h, NR | Anders Lie Nielsen (1:47.62); Daniel Skaaning (1:46.78); Søren Dahl (1:47.43); Magnus Westermann (1:50.83) | Denmark | 9 August 2016 | Olympic Games | Rio de Janeiro, Brazil | |
| 4×100m medley relay | 3:32.44 | NR | Robert Falborg Pedersen (53.61); Elias Elsgaard (59.35); Casper Puggaard (51.41); Oliver Søgaard-Andersen (48.07) | Denmark | 16 August 2026 | European Championships | Paris, France | |

Legend: # – Record awaiting ratification by Danish Swimming Federation; WR – World record; ER – European record; NR – Nordic record; e – equalled existing record;
Records not set in finals: h – heat; sf – semifinal; r – relay 1st leg; rh – relay heat 1st leg; b – B final; † – en route to final mark; so – swim-off; tt – time trial

=== Women ===
| Event | Time | | Name | Club | Date | Meet | Location | Ref |
|---|---|---|---|---|---|---|---|---|
| 50m freestyle | 23.75 | | Pernille Blume | Denmark | 4 August 2018 | European Championships | Glasgow, Great Britain | |
| 100m freestyle | 52.69 | | Pernille Blume | Denmark | 28 July 2017 | World Championships | Budapest, Hungary | |
| 200m freestyle | 1:57.61 | r | Julie Hjorth-Hansen | Denmark | 30 July 2009 | World Championships | Rome, Italy | |
| 400m freestyle | 4:03.98 | NR | Lotte Friis | Denmark | 29 July 2012 | Olympic Games | London, Great Britain | |
| 800m freestyle | 8:15.92 | NR | Lotte Friis | Denmark | 1 August 2009 | World Championships | Rome, Italy | |
| 1500m freestyle | 15:38.88 | ER, NR | Lotte Friis | Denmark | 30 July 2013 | World Championships | Barcelona, Spain | |
| 50m backstroke | 27.63 | sf | Mie Nielsen | Denmark | 5 August 2015 | World Championships | Kazan, Russia | |
| 100m backstroke | 58.73 | NR | Mie Nielsen | Denmark | 19 May 2016 | European Championships | London, Great Britain | |
| 200m backstroke | 2:10.27 | h, NR | Pernille Jessing Larsen | Denmark | 31 July 2009 | World Championships | Rome, Italy | |
| 50m breaststroke | 30.57 | sf | Rikke Møller Pedersen | Denmark | 3 August 2013 | World Championships | Barcelona, Spain | |
| 100m breaststroke | 1:05.93 | | Rikke Møller Pedersen | Denmark | 30 July 2013 | World Championships | Barcelona, Spain | |
| 200m breaststroke | 2:19.11 | sf, ER | Rikke Møller Pedersen | Denmark | 1 August 2013 | World Championships | Barcelona, Spain | |
| 50m butterfly | 25.24 | | Jeanette Ottesen | Denmark | 3 August 2013 | World Championships | Barcelona, Spain | |
| 100m butterfly | 56.51 | | Jeanette Ottesen | Denmark | 22 August 2014 | European Championships | Berlin, Germany | |
| 200m butterfly | 2:06.14 | NR | Helena Rosendahl Bach | Denmark | 16 August 2026 | European Championships | Paris, France | |
| 200m individual medley | 2:09.73 | NR | Julie Hjorth-Hansen | Denmark | 27 July 2009 | World Championships | Rome, Italy | |
| 400m individual medley | 4:38.20 | h, NR | Julie Hjorth-Hansen | Denmark | 2 August 2009 | World Championships | Rome, Italy | |
| 4×100m freestyle relay | 3:35.56 | h | Pernille Blume (53.15); Signe Bro (53.19); Julie Kepp Jensen (54.72); Jeanette Ottesen (54.50) | Denmark | 24 July 2021 | Olympic Games | Tokyo, Japan | |
| 4×200m freestyle relay | 7:55.56 | h | Julie Hjorth-Hansen (1:57.61); Micha Østergaard (1:59.29); Louise Mai Jansen (1:59.74); Lotte Friis (1:58.92) | Denmark | 30 July 2009 | World Championships | Rome, Italy | |
| 4×100m medley relay | 3:55.01 | | Mie Nielsen (58.75); Rikke Møller Pedersen (1:06.62); Jeanette Ottesen (56.43); Pernille Blume (53.21) | Denmark | 13 August 2016 | Olympic Games | Rio de Janeiro, Brazil | |

Legend: # – Record awaiting ratification by Danish Swimming Federation; WR – World record; ER – European record; NR – Nordic record; e – equalled existing record;
Records not set in finals: h – heat; sf – semifinal; r – relay 1st leg; rh – relay heat 1st leg; b – B final; † – en route to final mark; so – swim-off; tt – time trial

=== Mixed relay ===
| Event | Time | | Name | Club | Date | Meet | Location | Ref |
|---|---|---|---|---|---|---|---|---|
| 4×100m freestyle relay | 3:27.74 | h | Frederik Lentz (49.08); Oliver Søgaard-Andersen (48.44); Elisabeth Ebbesen (54.72); Schastine Tabor (55.50) | Denmark | 2 August 2025 | World Championships | Singapore, Singapore | |
| 4×200m freestyle relay | 7:35.81 | | Mikkel Gadgaard (1:48.75); Andreas Hansen (1:48.55); Signe Bro (2:00.10); Helena Rosendahl Bach (1:58.41) | Denmark | 18 May 2021 | European Championships | Budapest, Hungary | |
| 4×100m medley relay | 3:47.72 | h | Robert Falborg Pedersen (53.99); Elias Elsgaard (1:00.47); Helena Rosendahl Bach (58.06); Julie Kepp Jensen (55.20) | Denmark | 11 August 2026 | European Championships | Paris, France | |

Legend: # – Record awaiting ratification by Danish Swimming Federation; WR – World record; ER – European record; NR – Nordic record; e – equalled existing record;
Records not set in finals: h – heat; sf – semifinal; r – relay 1st leg; rh – relay heat 1st leg; b – B final; † – en route to final mark; so – swim-off; tt – time trial

== Short course (25 m) ==
=== Men ===
| Event | Time | | Name | Club | Date | Meet | Location | Ref |
|---|---|---|---|---|---|---|---|---|
| 50m freestyle | 21.26 | rh | Jakob Andkjær | Denmark | 13 December 2009 | European Championships | Istanbul, Turkey | |
| 100m freestyle | 47.05 | | Robert Falborg Pedersen | Gladsaxe | 3 October 2026 | Øst Junior/Senior Kortbane | Bellahøj, Denmark | |
| 200m freestyle | 1:42.34 | sf | Oliver Søgaard-Andersen | Denmark | 3 December 2025 | European Championships | Lublin, Poland | |
| 400m freestyle | 3:36.82 | | Mads Glæsner | Denmark | 10 December 2009 | European Championships | Istanbul, Turkey | |
| 800m freestyle | 7:32.77 | | Alexander Nørgaard | Sigma | 18 December 2020 | Danish Championships | Helsingør, Denmark | |
| 1500m freestyle | 14:26.74 | | Mads Glæsner | Denmark | 12 December 2009 | European Championships | Istanbul, Turkey | |
| 50m backstroke | 22.94 | NR | Robert Falborg Pedersen | Denmark | 7 December 2025 | European Championships | Lublin, Poland | |
| 100m backstroke | 50.67 | =NR | Robert Falborg Pedersen | Gladsaxe | 3 October 2026 | Øst Junior/Senior Kortbane | Bellahøj, Denmark | |
| 200m backstroke | 1:52.33 | | Anders Jensen | Vallensbæk I.F. Af 1939 | 19 December 2009 | - | Bellahøj, Denmark | |
| 50m breaststroke | 26.14 | h, =NR | Tobias Bjerg | Denmark | 4 December 2019 | European Championships | Glasgow, Great Britain | |
| 100m breaststroke | 56.84 | sf | Jonas Gaur | Denmark | 2 December 2025 | European Championships | Lublin, Poland | |
| 200m breaststroke | 2:05.38 | h | Chris Christensen | Denmark | 13 December 2009 | European Championships | Istanbul, Turkey | |
| 50m butterfly | 22.69 | = | Rasmus Nickelsen | Swim Team Odense | 15 December 2023 | Danish Championships | Greve, Denmark | |
| 50m butterfly | 22.69 | sf, = | Rasmus Nickelsen | Denmark | 2 December 2025 | European Championships | Lublin, Poland | |
| 100m butterfly | 50.64 | | Rasmus Nickelsen | Swim Team Odense | 17 December 2023 | Danish Championships | Greve, Denmark | |
| 200m butterfly | 1:51.62 | NR | Viktor Bromer | Denmark | 6 December 2015 | European Championships | Netanya, Israel | |
| 100m individual medley | 51.73 | | Robert Falborg Pedersen | Denmark | 4 December 2025 | European Championships | Lublin, Poland | |
| 200m individual medley | 1:54.86 | | Viktor Bromer | Aalborg Svømmeklub | 14 November 2013 | Danish Championships | Gladsaxe, Denmark | |
| 400m individual medley | 4:05.98 | h | Chris Christensen | Denmark | 11 December 2009 | European Championships | Istanbul, Turkey | |
| 4×50m freestyle relay | 1:25.37 | h | Malthe Lindeblad (21.69); Frederik Moller (21.07); Robert Falborg Pedersen (21.05); William Textor-broch (21.56) | Denmark | 2 December 2025 | European Championships | Lublin, Poland | |
| 4×100m freestyle relay | 3:11.25 | | Oskar Lindholm (47.83); Malthe Lindeblad (47.30); Christian Frederiksen (48.17); Andreas Hansen (47.95) | Agfs | 13 December 2025 | Danish Championships | Greve, Denmark | |
| 4×200m freestyle relay | 6:54.49 | NR | Sebastian Ovesen (1:44.75); Daniel Skaaning (1:44.15); Frans Johannessen (1:43.70); Anders Lie Nielsen (1:41.89) | Denmark | 9 December 2016 | World Championships | Windsor, Canada | |
| 4×50m medley relay | 1:32.86 | h | Robert Falborg Pedersen (23.40); Jonas Gaur (25.77); Rasmus Nickelsen (22.48); Malthe Lindeblad (21.21) | Denmark | 7 December 2025 | European Championships | Lublin, Poland | |
| 4×100m medley relay | 3:31.07 | | Mads Peter Hansen (53.49); Jonas Gaur (57.56); Sofus Bolwig Balladone (52.36); Oskar Lindholm (47.66) | Agfs | 12 December 2025 | Danish Championships | Greve, Denmark | |

Legend: # – Record awaiting ratification by Danish Swimming Federation; WR – World record; ER – European record; NR – Nordic record; e – equalled existing record;
Records not set in finals: h – heat; sf – semifinal; r – relay 1st leg; rh – relay heat 1st leg; b – B final; † – en route to final mark; so – swim-off; tt – time trial

=== Women ===
| Event | Time | | Name | Club | Date | Meet | Location | Ref |
|---|---|---|---|---|---|---|---|---|
| 50m freestyle | 23.49 | = | Jeanette Ottesen | Denmark | 12 December 2015 | Duel in the Pool | Indianapolis, United States | |
| 50m freestyle | 23.49 | = | Pernille Blume | Denmark | 17 December 2017 | European Championships | Copenhagen, Denmark | |
| 100m freestyle | 51.58 | | Jeanette Ottesen | Denmark | 9 October 2016 | World Cup | Doha, Qatar | |
| 200m freestyle | 1:54.82 | | Martine Damborg | Svømmeklubben Kvik | 14 December 2024 | Danish Championships | Bellahøj, Denmark | |
| 400m freestyle | 3:58.02 | NR | Lotte Friis | Denmark | 10 December 2011 | European Championships | Szczecin, Poland | |
| 800m freestyle | 8:04.61 | NR | Lotte Friis | Denmark | 14 November 2009 | World Cup | Berlin, Germany | |
| 1500m freestyle | 15:28.65 | NR | Lotte Friis | Allerød SK | 28 November 2009 | Danish Club Championships | Birkerød, Denmark | |
| 50m backstroke | 25.85 | h | Julie Kepp Jensen | Denmark | 15 December 2022 | World Championships | Melbourne, Australia | |
| 100m backstroke | 55.99 | | Mie Nielsen | Denmark | 13 December 2013 | European Championships | Herning, Denmark | |
| 200m backstroke | 2:03.50 | | Pernille Jessing Larsen | Denmark | 13 December 2009 | European Championships | Istanbul, Turkey | |
| 50m breaststroke | 29.87 | | Rikke Møller Pedersen | Denmark | 12 December 2013 | European Championships | Herning, Denmark | |
| 100m breaststroke | 1:03.74 | NR | Rikke Møller Pedersen | Denmark | 10 August 2013 | World Cup | Berlin, Germany | |
| 200m breaststroke | 2:15.21 | ER, NR | Rikke Møller Pedersen | Denmark | 13 December 2013 | European Championships | Herning, Denmark | |
| 50m butterfly | 24.61 | | Martine Damborg | Denmark | 3 December 2025 | European Championships | Lublin, Poland | |
| 100m butterfly | 55.10 | | Jeanette Ottesen | Denmark | 11 December 2015 | Duel in the Pool | Indianapolis, United States | |
| 200m butterfly | 2:03.55 | NR | Helena Bach | Denmark | 7 December 2025 | European Championships | Lublin, Poland | |
| 100m individual medley | 58.17 | | Martine Damborg | Svømmeklubben Kvik | 15 December 2024 | Danish Championships | Bellahøj, Denmark | |
| 200m individual medley | 2:07.08 | | Julie Hjorth-Hansen | Sigma/Birkerød | 18 April 2009 | Danish Club Championships | Kastrup, Denmark | |
| 400m individual medley | 4:32.39 | | Julie Hjorth-Hansen | Sigma/Birkerød | 18 April 2009 | Danish Club Championships | Kastrup, Denmark | |
| 4×50m freestyle relay | 1:35.24 | | Julie Kepp Jensen (24.44); Jeanette Ottesen (23.61); Emilie Beckmann (23.99); Pernille Blume (23.20) | Denmark | 6 December 2019 | European Championships | Glasgow, Great Britain | |
| 4×100m freestyle relay | 3:29.86 | | Jeanette Ottesen (51.91); Julie Larsen Levisen (53.26); Mie Nielsen (52.03); Pernille Blume (52.66) | Denmark | 5 December 2014 | World Championships | Doha, Qatar | |
| 4×200m freestyle relay | 7:47.04 | | Lotte Friis (1:55.93); Pernille Blume (1:56.81); Katrine Holm Sørensen (2:00.57); Mie Nielsen (1:53.73) | Denmark | 12 December 2012 | World Championships | Istanbul, Turkey | |
| 4×50m medley relay | 1:44.04 | | Mie Nielsen (26.39); Rikke Møller Pedersen (29.56); Jeanette Ottesen (24.09); Pernille Blume (24.00) | Denmark | 5 December 2014 | World Championships | Doha, Qatar | |
| 4×100m medley relay | 3:48.86 | | Mie Nielsen (56.86); Rikke Møller Pedersen (1:04.62); Jeanette Ottesen (54.99); Pernille Blume (52.39) | Denmark | 7 December 2014 | World Championships | Doha, Qatar | |

Legend: # – Record awaiting ratification by Danish Swimming Federation; WR – World record; ER – European record; NR – Nordic record; e – equalled existing record;
Records not set in finals: h – heat; sf – semifinal; r – relay 1st leg; rh – relay heat 1st leg; b – B final; † – en route to final mark; so – swim-off; tt – time trial

=== Mixed relay ===
| Event | Time | | Name | Club | Date | Meet | Location | Ref |
|---|---|---|---|---|---|---|---|---|
| 4×50 m freestyle relay | 1:29.45 | NR | Robert Falborg Pedersen (21.49); Frederik Moller (20.91); Julie Kepp Jensen (23.47); Martine Damborg (23.58) | Denmark | 4 December 2025 | European Championships | Lublin, Poland | |
| 4×50 m medley relay | 1:37.53 | h | Robert Falborg Pedersen (23.22); Jonas Gaur (25.84); Martine Damborg (24.99); Julie Kepp Jensen (23.48) | Denmark | 3 December 2025 | European Championships | Lublin, Poland | |

Legend: # – Record awaiting ratification by Danish Swimming Association; NR – Nordic record; e – equalled existing record;
Records not set in finals: h – heat; so – swim-off
