= Denmark at the 2024 World Aquatics Championships =

- Flag of Denmark
- FINA code: DEN
- National federation: Danish Swimming Union

in Doha, Qatar
- Competitors: 4 in 3 sports
- Medals Ranked 27th: Gold 0 Silver 1 Bronze 0 Total 1

World Aquatics Championships appearances (overview)
- 1973; 1975; 1978; 1982; 1986; 1991; 1994; 1998; 2001; 2003; 2005; 2007; 2009; 2011; 2013; 2015; 2017; 2019; 2022; 2023; 2024

Denmark competed at the 2024 World Aquatics Championships in Doha, Qatar from 2 to 18 February.

== Medalists ==
Medal	Name	Sport	Event	Date
2nd place, silver medalist(s)	Helena Rosendahl Bach	Swimming	Women's 200 metre butterfly	15 February 2024

== Competitors ==
The following is the list of competitors in the Championships.

Sport	Men	Women	Total
Diving	0	1	1
High diving	0	1	1
Swimming	0	2	2
Total	0	4	4

== Diving ==
Women

Athlete	Event	Preliminaries		Semifinals		Final	
Athlete	Event	Points	Rank	Points	Rank	Points	Rank
Laura Valore	1 m springboard	165.25	39	—		Did not advance	

== High diving ==
Athlete	Event	Points	Rank
Annika Bornebusch	Women's high diving	158.40	16

== Swimming ==
Denmark entered 2 swimmers.

Women

Athlete	Event	Heat		Semifinal		Final	
Athlete	Event	Time	Rank	Time	Rank	Time	Rank
Helena Rosendahl Bach	100 metre butterfly	58.67	9 Q	58.15	9	Did not advance	
Helena Rosendahl Bach	200 metre butterfly	2:09.21	1 Q	2:07.45	1 Q	2:07.44	2nd place, silver medalist(s)
Julie Kepp Jensen	50 metre freestyle	24.97	11 Q	24.80	11	Did not advance	
