= Swimming at the 2016 Summer Olympics – Women's 50 metre freestyle =

Women's 50 metre freestyle at the Games of the XXXI Olympiad
- Venue: Olympic Aquatics Stadium
- Dates: 12 August 2016 (heats & semifinals); 13 August 2016 (final)
- Competitors: 91 from 76 nations
- Winning time: 24.07

Medalists
1st place, gold medalist(s)		Pernille Blume; Denmark
2nd place, silver medalist(s)		Simone Manuel; United States
3rd place, bronze medalist(s)		Aliaksandra Herasimenia; Belarus

The women's 50 metre freestyle event at the 2016 Summer Olympics took place on 12–13 August at the Olympic Aquatics Stadium.

== Summary ==
Pernille Blume defeated the field of experienced sprinters to give Denmark its first Olympic swimming title in 68 years. Leading the program's shortest race from prelims into the semifinals, she splashed her way to a gold-medal triumph in 24.07, but fell short of her attempt to overhaul Ranomi Kromowidjojo's Olympic record by a small fraction of a second. U.S. sprinter Simone Manuel, newly crowned Olympic champion of the 100 m freestyle, settled for the silver in 24.09, stopping 0.02 seconds behind Blume. Meanwhile, London 2012 runner-up Aliaksandra Herasimenia of Belarus secured the top three spot with a 24.11 for the bronze.

Great Britain's Francesca Halsall narrowly missed out of the medals by 0.02 of a second, finishing with a fourth-place time in 24.13. Unable to bounce back from their out-of-medal feat in the 100 m freestyle, sisters and pre-race favorites Cate (24.15) and Bronte Campbell (24.42) slipped to fifth and seventh, respectively, while defending champion Kromowidjojo of the Netherlands split the Australian duo to take the sixth spot in 24.19. Brazil's hometown favorite Etiene Medeiros wrapped up the top eight with a 24.69.

Notable swimmers failed to reach the top eight final, including Blume's fellow sprinter Jeanette Ottesen, London 2012 finalist Arianna Vanderpool-Wallace of the Bahamas, and Swedish tandem of three-time medalist Sarah Sjöström and Therese Alshammar, who built a historic milestone as the first ever female in the pool to compete at her sixth Olympics.

== Records ==
Prior to this competition, the existing world and Olympic records were as follows.

World record	Britta Steffen (GER)	23.73	Rome, Italy	2 August 2009
Olympic record	Ranomi Kromowidjojo (NED)	24.05	London, United Kingdom	4 August 2012

== Competition format ==
The competition consisted of three rounds: heats, semifinals, and a final. The swimmers with the best 16 times in the heats advanced to the semifinals. The swimmers with the best 8 times in the semifinals advanced to the final. Swim-offs were used as necessary to break ties for advancement to the next round.

== Results ==
=== Heats ===
Rank	Heat	Lane	Name	Nationality	Time	Notes
1	12	6	Pernille Blume	Denmark	24.23	Q
2	11	5	Fran Halsall	Great Britain	24.26	Q
3	10	6	Aliaksandra Herasimenia	Belarus	24.42	Q
4	12	4	Bronte Campbell	Australia	24.45	Q
5	10	5	Abbey Weitzeil	United States	24.48	Q
5	11	6	Jeanette Ottesen	Denmark	24.48	Q
7	11	4	Cate Campbell	Australia	24.52	Q
8	10	3	Chantal Van Landeghem	Canada	24.57	Q
8	10	4	Ranomi Kromowidjojo	Netherlands	24.57	Q
10	12	5	Sarah Sjöström	Sweden	24.66	Q
11	11	3	Simone Manuel	United States	24.71	Q
12	11	7	Therese Alshammar	Sweden	24.73	Q
13	9	7	Inge Dekker	Netherlands	24.77	Q
13	12	3	Arianna Vanderpool-Wallace	Bahamas	24.77	Q
13	12	7	Dorothea Brandt	Germany	24.77	Q
16	11	2	Etiene Medeiros	Brazil	24.82	Q
17	11	8	Silvia di Pietro	Italy	24.89	
18	9	4	Farida Osman	Egypt	24.91	AF
18	10	7	Liu Xiang	China	24.91	
18	12	1	Michelle Williams	Canada	24.91	
21	10	2	Anna Santamans	France	24.93	
22	8	8	Vanessa García	Puerto Rico	24.94	NR
22	11	1	Rozaliya Nasretdinova	Russia	24.94	
24	7	4	Susann Bjørnsen	Norway	25.05	
25	10	8	Flóra Molnár	Hungary	25.07	
26	7	6	Julie Meynen	Luxembourg	25.12	
27	9	6	Yuliya Khitraya	Belarus	25.18	
28	7	5	Liliana Ibáñez	Mexico	25.25	
29	9	5	Aleksandra Urbańczyk	Poland	25.28	
30	7	2	Isabella Arcila	Colombia	25.35	
31	8	4	Mélanie Henique	France	25.36	
32	9	3	Theodora Drakou	Greece	25.36	
33	8	7	Zohar Shikler	Israel	25.38	
34	8	3	Erika Ferraioli	Italy	25.40	
35	9	8	Andrea Murez	Israel	25.41	
36	9	2	Rikako Ikee	Japan	25.45	
37	8	5	Anna Dowgiert	Poland	25.54	
38	12	8	Nataliya Lovtsova	Russia	25.55	
39	8	6	Birgit Koschischek	Austria	25.58	
40	10	1	Graciele Herrmann	Brazil	25.60	
41	7	3	Alexandra Touretski	Switzerland	25.66	
42	9	1	Darya Stepanyuk	Ukraine	25.67	
43	8	1	Yayoi Matsumoto	Japan	25.73	
44	7	8	Camille Cheng	Hong Kong	25.92	
45	7	7	Allyson Ponson	Aruba	26.00	
46	6	2	Karen Torrez	Bolivia	26.12	
47	6	4	Naomi Ruele	Botswana	26.23	
48	6	8	Elinah Phillip	British Virgin Islands	26.26	
49	6	3	Bayan Jumah	Syria	26.41	
49	7	1	Lin Pei-wun	Chinese Taipei	26.41	
51	6	7	Talita Baqlah	Jordan	26.48	
52	6	5	Rebecca Heyliger	Bermuda	26.54	
53	6	6	Nicola Muscat	Malta	26.60	
54	5	6	Faye Sultan	Independent Olympic Athletes	26.86	
55	6	1	Dorian McMenemy	Dominican Republic	27.37	
56	5	3	Naomy Grand Pierre	Haiti	27.46	
57	5	5	Samantha Roberts	Antigua and Barbuda	27.95	
58	4	4	Colleen Furgeson	Marshall Islands	28.16	
59	5	2	Noura Mana	Morocco	28.20	
60	4	6	Yesuin Bayar	Mongolia	28.40	NR
61	5	8	Irene Prescott	Tonga	28.68	
62	4	7	Mary Al-Atrash	Palestine	28.76	
63	5	7	Jamila Sanmoogan	Guyana	28.88	
64	5	1	Lianna Swan	Pakistan	29.02	
65	3	3	Dirngulbai Misech	Palau	29.19	
66	4	8	Hemthon Vitiny	Cambodia	29.37	NR
67	3	4	Angelika Ouedraogo	Burkina Faso	29.44	NR
67	4	5	Magdalena Moshi	Tanzania	29.44	
69	3	5	Sonia Aktar	Bangladesh	29.99	NR
70	1	6	Ei Ei Thet	Myanmar	30.25	
71	4	2	Ammara Pinto	Malawi	30.32	
72	4	1	Debra Daniel	Federated States of Micronesia	30.83	
73	2	2	Anastasiya Tyurina	Tajikistan	31.15	
74	1	3	Fatema Almahmeed	Bahrain	32.28	
75	3	6	Rahel Gebresilassie	Ethiopia	32.51	
76	3	7	Siri Arun Budcharern	Laos	32.55	NR
77	2	6	Laraïba Seibou	Benin	33.01	
78	1	5	Nada Al-Bedwawi	United Arab Emirates	33.42	
79	3	8	Adzo Kpossi	Togo	33.44	
80	3	1	Elsie Uwamahoro	Burundi	33.70	
81	2	4	Bellore Sangala	Republic of the Congo	33.71	
81	3	2	Fatoumata Samassékou	Mali	33.71	
83	2	7	Roukaya Mahamane	Niger	35.60	NR
84	2	5	Haneen Ibrahim	Sudan	36.23	
85	2	8	Chloe Sauvourel	Central African Republic	37.15	
86	2	3	Nazlati Mohamed Andhumdine	Comoros	37.66	
87	2	1	Mariama Sow	Guinea	39.85	
88	1	4	Bunturabie Jalloh	Sierra Leone	39.93	
	5	4	Monika Vasilyan	Armenia		DNS
	12	2	Chen Xinyi	China		DNS
	4	3	Awa Ly N'diaye	Senegal		DSQ

=== Semifinals ===
==== Semifinal 1 ====
Rank	Lane	Name	Nationality	Time	Notes
1	4	Francesca Halsall	Great Britain	24.41	Q
2	5	Bronte Campbell	Australia	24.43	Q
3	8	Etiene Medeiros	Brazil	24.45	Q, SA
4	1	Arianna Vanderpool-Wallace	Bahamas	24.60	
5	6	Chantal Van Landeghem	Canada	24.61	
6	3	Jeanette Ottesen	Denmark	24.62	
7	2	Sarah Sjöström	Sweden	24.69	
8	7	Therese Alshammar	Sweden	24.72	

==== Semifinal 2 ====
Rank	Lane	Name	Nationality	Time	Notes
1	4	Pernille Blume	Denmark	24.28	Q
2	6	Cate Campbell	Australia	24.32	Q
3	2	Ranomi Kromowidjojo	Netherlands	24.39	Q
4	7	Simone Manuel	United States	24.44	Q
5	5	Aliaksandra Herasimenia	Belarus	24.53	Q
6	3	Abbey Weitzeil	United States	24.67	
7	8	Dorothea Brandt	Germany	24.71	
8	1	Inge Dekker	Netherlands	25.31	

=== Final ===
Rank	Lane	Name	Nationality	Time	Notes
1st place, gold medalist(s)	4	Pernille Blume	Denmark	24.07	NR
2nd place, silver medalist(s)	7	Simone Manuel	United States	24.09	
3rd place, bronze medalist(s)	8	Aliaksandra Herasimenia	Belarus	24.11	NR
4	6	Francesca Halsall	Great Britain	24.13	
5	5	Cate Campbell	Australia	24.15	
6	3	Ranomi Kromowidjojo	Netherlands	24.19	
7	2	Bronte Campbell	Australia	24.42	
8	1	Etiene Medeiros	Brazil	24.69	
