= 2014 FINA World Swimming Championships (25 m) – Women's 4 × 100 metre medley relay =

Women's 4 × 100 metre medley relay at the 2014 FINA World Swimming Championships (25 m)
- Dates: 7 December
- Competitors: 60 from 15 nations
- Winning time: 3:48.86

Medalists
gold medal	Mie Nielsen; Rikke Møller Pedersen; Jeanette Ottesen; Pernille Blume	Denmark
silver medal	Madison Wilson; Sally Hunter; Emily Seebohm; Bronte Campbell	Australia
bronze medal	Sayaka Akase; Kanako Watanabe; Rino Hosoda; Miki Uchida	Japan

The Women's 4 × 100 metre medley relay competition of the 2014 FINA World Swimming Championships (25 m) was held on 7 December.

== Records ==
Prior to the competition, the existing world and championship records were as follows.

	Nation	Time	Location	Date
World record	United States	3:45.56	Atlanta	16 December 2011
Championship record	China	3:48.29	Dubai	17 December 2010

== Results ==
=== Heats ===
The heats were held at 11:39.

Rank	Heat	Lane	Nation	Swimmers	Time	Notes
1	1	5	Denmark	Mie Nielsen (57.38); Rikke Møller Pedersen (1:05.90); Jeanette Ottesen (56.91); Pernille Blume (52.71)	3:52.90	Q
2	1	4	Japan	Sayaka Akase (57.86); Satomi Suzuki (1:06.00); Rino Hosoda (57.22); Miki Uchida (52.06)	3:53.14	Q
3	2	8	Australia	Madison Wilson (57.85); Leiston Pickett (1:05.35); Brianna Throssell (57.95); Bronte Campbell (52.51)	3:53.66	Q
4	2	6	Sweden	Michelle Coleman (58.19); Jennie Johansson (1:04.78); Louise Hansson (57.63); Sarah Sjöström (53.10)	3:53.70	Q
5	2	2	Italy	Arianna Barbieri (58.64); Arianna Castiglioni (1:05.70); Elena di Liddo (56.75); Aglaia Pezzato (53.23)	3:54.32	Q
6	2	1	Finland	Mimosa Jallow (58.96); Jenna Laukkanen (1:05.06); Emilia Pikkarainen (58.83); Hanna-Maria Seppälä (52.80)	3:55.65	Q
7	1	8	Germany	Jenny Mensing (59.06); Vanessa Grimberg (1:05.86); Franziska Hentke (57.84); Annika Bruhn (52.93)	3:55.69	Q
8	1	1	Russia	Daria Ustinova (58.17); Valentina Artemeva (1:05.98); Svetlana Chimrova (57.36); Elena Sokolova (54.26)	3:55.77	Q
9	2	5	United States	Kathleen Baker (58.46); Caitlin Leverenz (1:06.45); Claire Donahue (57.72); Amanda Weir (53.76)	3:56.39	
10	1	3	China	Wang Xueer (59.23); He Yun (1:05.22); Zhang Yufei (58.40); Zhang Jiaqi (54.21)	3:57.06	
11	2	3	Czech Republic	Simona Baumrtová (57.51); Petra Choková (1:06.22); Lucie Svěcená (58.90); Anna Kolárová (54.48)	3:57.11	
12	1	0	Turkey	Ekaterina Avramova (59.20); Viktoria Güneş (1:04.84); Nida Eliz Üstündağ (1:00.73); İlknur Nihan Çakıcı (56.05)	4:00.82	
13	1	2	South Africa	Lehesta Kemp (1:01.46); Tatjana Schoenmaker (1:09.75); Rene Warnes (1:03.75); Trudi Maree (55.56)	4:10.52	
14	2	7	Namibia	Zanre Oberholzer (1:01.78); Daniela Lindemeier (1:12.96); Sonja Adelaar (1:05.10); Antonia Roth (1:00.97)	4:20.81	
15	2	9	India	Aditi Dhumatkar (1:06.45); Anusha Sanjeev Mehta (1:25.79); Malavika Vishwanath (1:10.56); Thalasha Satish Prabhu (1:00.60)	4:43.40	
—	1	6	Seychelles			DNS
—	1	7	Brazil			DNS
—	2	0	Papua New Guinea			DNS
—	2	4	United Kingdom			DNS

=== Final ===
The final was held at 20:27.

Rank	Lane	Nation	Swimmers	Time	Notes
1st place, gold medalist(s)	4	Denmark	Mie Nielsen (56.86); Rikke Møller Pedersen (1:04.62); Jeanette Ottesen (54.99); Pernille Blume (52.39)	3:48.86	ER
2nd place, silver medalist(s)	3	Australia	Madison Wilson (57.31); Sally Hunter (1:04.34); Emily Seebohm (57.26); Bronte Campbell (51.40)	3:50.31	
3rd place, bronze medalist(s)	5	Japan	Sayaka Akase (57.11); Kanako Watanabe (1:05.32); Rino Hosoda (56.89); Miki Uchida (51.18)	3:50.50	
4	6	Sweden	Michelle Coleman (57.24); Jennie Johansson (1:05.07); Sarah Sjöström (56.88); Louise Hansson (52.45)	3:51.64	
5	8	Russia	Daria Ustinova (58.16); Mariia Astashkina (1:05.74); Svetlana Chimrova (57.70); Veronika Popova (52.08)	3:53.68	
6	7	Finland	Mimosa Jallow (58.64); Jenna Laukkanen (1:04.78); Emilia Pikkarainen (58.47); Hanna-Maria Seppälä (52.92)	3:54.81	
7	2	Italy	Arianna Barbieri (58.88); Arianna Castiglioni (1:05.60); Ilaria Bianchi (57.65); Erika Ferraioli (53.02)	3:55.15	
8	1	Germany	Jenny Mensing (58.93); Vanessa Grimberg (1:05.79); Franziska Hentke (57.85); Annika Bruhn (52.72)	3:55.29	
