= Magnus Westermann =

Danish swimmer

Personal information
- Nationality: Danish
- Born: 13 March 1995 (age 31)

Sport
- Sport: Swimming

Magnus Westermann (born 13 March 1995) is a Danish swimmer. He competed in the men's 4 × 200 metre freestyle relay event at the 2016 Summer Olympics.
