= Flaka Pruthi =

Kosovan swimmer

Personal information
- Born: 30 June 1999 (age 27)

Sport
- Sport: Swimming

Flaka Pruthi (born 30 June 1999) is a Kosovan swimmer. She competed in the women's 100 metre freestyle event at the 2017 World Aquatics Championships.
