= Awa Ly N'diaye =

Senegalese swimmer (born 2000)

Personal information
- Born: 15 January 2000 (age 26)

Sport
- Sport: Swimming

Awa Ly N'diaye (born 15 January 2000) is a Senegalese swimmer. She competed in the women's 50 metre freestyle event at the 2016 Summer Olympics. She was disqualified and did not advance to the semi-finals.
