= Daniel Skaaning =

Danish swimmer

Personal information
- Born: 22 June 1993 (age 33)

Sport
- Sport: Swimming

Daniel Skaaning (born 22 June 1993) is a Danish former freestyle swimmer. He competed in the 4 × 200 metre freestyle relay event at the 2012 Summer Olympics. He is a teacher in a school in Taastrup.
