= Anders Lie =

Danish swimmer (born 1991)

Personal information
- Born: April 11, 1991 (age 35) Frederiksberg, Denmark

Sport
- Sport: Swimming

Anders Lie Nielsen (born 11 April 1991) is an Olympic swimmer from Denmark. He swam for Denmark at the 2012 Summer Olympics, in the men's 4 × 200 m freestyle relay. As of 2013, he was attending and swimming for the University of Michigan (USA). At the 2016 Summer Olympics, he again competed for Denmark in the men's 4 × 200 m freestyle relay.
