= Signe Bro =

Danish swimmer (born 1999)

Personal information
- Nationality: Danish
- Born: 5 March 1999 (age 27)

Sport
- Sport: Swimming
- Strokes: Freestyle
Medal record
European Championships (LC)
Bronze medal – third place	2018 Glasgow	4×100 m freestyle

Signe Bro (born 5 March 1999) is a Danish swimmer. She competed in the women's 200 metre freestyle event at the 2017 World Aquatics Championships.

In 2019, she represented Denmark at the 2019 World Aquatics Championships held in Gwangju, South Korea. She competed in the women's 100 metre freestyle event and she did not advance to compete in the semi-finals. She also competed in two relay events, without winning a medal.

Bro participated in the International Swimming League in 2020, for the US-based team, New York Breakers.
