= Julie Kepp Jensen =

Danish swimmer (born 2000)

Julie Jensen
Personal information
- Full name: Julie Kepp Jensen
- Nationality: Danish
- Born: 3 January 2000 (age 26) Hvidovre, Denmark

Sport
- Sport: Swimming
- Strokes: Freestyle
Medal record
European Championships (LC)
Silver medal – second place	2024 Belgrade	4 × 100 m freestyle
Bronze medal – third place	2018 Glasgow	4×100 m freestyle
Bronze medal – third place	2024 Belgrade	50 m freestyle
European Championships (SC)
Silver medal – second place	2017 Copenhagen	4×50 m medley
Bronze medal – third place	2017 Copenhagen	4×50 m freestyle
Bronze medal – third place	2019 Glasgow	4×50 m freestyle
Bronze medal – third place	2023 Otopeni	50 m freestyle
European Junior Championships
Silver medal – second place	2017 Netanya	50 m freestyle

Julie Kepp Jensen (born 3 January 2000) is a Danish swimmer. She competed in the women's 4 × 100m freestyle relay event at the 2016 Summer Olympics where she placed 12th. She competed in the 2020 Summer Olympics and placed 8th in the same event, and also competed in the women's 50m freestyle event. She placed 11th and got a personal best, qualifying for the semifinals for the women's 50m freestyle in Paris 2024. She ended up in 16th place during the semifinals.
