= Pernille Blume =

Danish swimmer (born 1994)

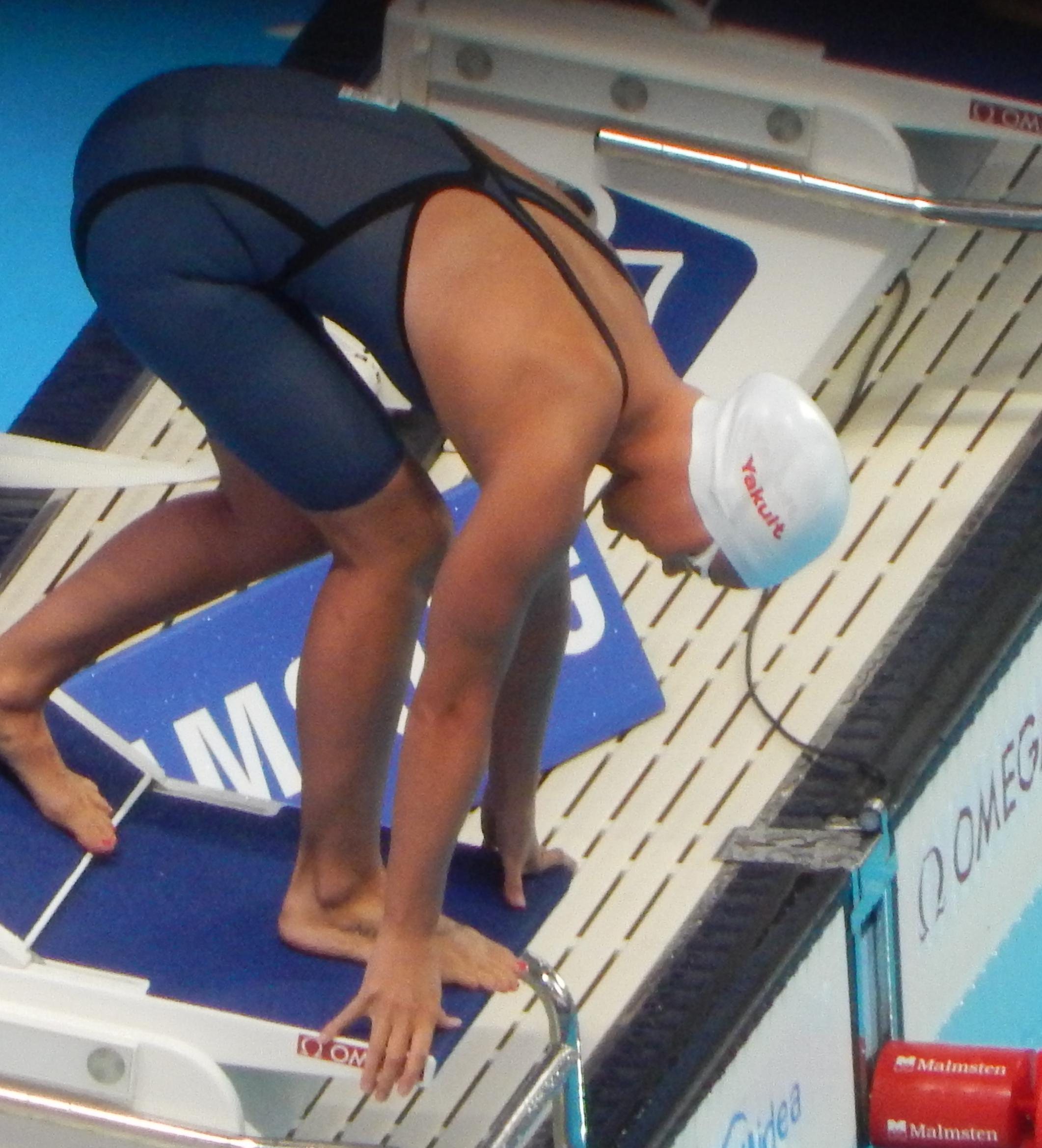
- Blume in 2015

Personal information
- Nationality: Danish
- Born: 14 May 1994 (age 32) Herlev, Denmark
- Height: 1.70 m (5 ft 7 in)
- Weight: 58 kg (128 lb)

Sport
- Sport: Swimming
- Strokes: Freestyle, medley
- Club: CN Antibes; Sigma Nordsjælland (former)
- Coach: Shannon Rollason (national team)
Medal record
Women's swimming
Representing Denmark
Event	1st	2nd	3rd
Olympic Games	1	0	2
World Championships (LC)	0	0	1
World Championships (SC)	3	0	2
European Championships (LC)	1	3	1
European Championships (SC)	5	2	6
Total	10	5	12
Olympic Games
Gold medal – first place	2016 Rio de Janeiro	50 m freestyle
Bronze medal – third place	2016 Rio de Janeiro	4×100 m medley
Bronze medal – third place	2020 Tokyo	50 m freestyle
World Championships (LC)
Bronze medal – third place	2017 Budapest	100 m freestyle
World Championships (SC)
Gold medal – first place	2012 Istanbul	4×100 m medley
Gold medal – first place	2014 Doha	4×50 m medley
Gold medal – first place	2014 Doha	4×100 m medley
Bronze medal – third place	2012 Istanbul	4×100 m freestyle
Bronze medal – third place	2014 Doha	4×50 m freestyle
European Championships (LC)
Gold medal – first place	2014 Berlin	4×100 m medley
Silver medal – second place	2018 Glasgow	50 m freestyle
Silver medal – second place	2018 Glasgow	4×100 m medley
Silver medal – second place	2020 Budapest	50 m freestyle
Bronze medal – third place	2018 Glasgow	4×100 m freestyle
European Championships (SC)
Gold medal – first place	2011 Szczecin	4×50 m medley
Gold medal – first place	2012 Chartres	4×50 m freestyle
Gold medal – first place	2012 Chartres	4×50 m medley
Gold medal – first place	2013 Herning	4×50 m freestyle
Gold medal – first place	2013 Herning	4×50 m medley
Silver medal – second place	2011 Szcczecin	4×50 m freestyle
Silver medal – second place	2017 Copenhagen	4×50 m medley
Bronze medal – third place	2017 Copenhagen	50 m freestyle
Bronze medal – third place	2017 Copenhagen	100 m freestyle
Bronze medal – third place	2017 Copenhagen	4×50 m freestyle
Bronze medal – third place	2019 Glasgow	50 m freestyle
Bronze medal – third place	2019 Glasgow	4×50 m freestyle
Bronze medal – third place	2019 Glasgow	4×50 m mixed medley

Pernille Blume (Danish pronunciation: [ˈpʰɐniːlə ˈplum]; born 14 May 1994) is a Danish former swimmer specializing in sprint freestyle events. She competed at the 2012 Summer Olympics. At the 2016 Summer Olympics she was the gold medalist in the women's 50 metre freestyle and won a bronze medal in the women's 4 × 100 metre medley relay where she swam the freestyle leg of the relay in both the prelims and the final. She also competed at the 2020 Summer Olympics, winning a bronze medal in the 50 metre freestyle.

== Personal life ==
Blume was born on 14 May 1994 in Herlev, Denmark.

In February 2020, Blume started dating French Olympic swimmer Florent Manaudou, and in September 2021 they announced their engagement.

Blume swam for Sigma Nordsjælland Club in Denmark until early 2022. When her fiancé, Florent Manaudou, announced he was changing swimming clubs, it was announced that Blume would likely change clubs to his new club, CN Antibes, as well, so she could train with him as they prepared for the 2024 Summer Olympics in Manaudou's home country of France. In February 2022, Blume officially switched to and started competing for CN Antibes. Manaudou and Blume are no longer together, their relationship ending sometime before June 2024.

On 10 June 2026 she announced that she was expecting her first child.

== Career ==
=== 2012 Summer Olympics ===
At the 2012 Summer Olympics in London, Blume competed for the Danish team in five different events. In the 50 metre freestyle she failed to advance beyond the heats having finished 8th in her race and 26th fastest overall. In the 100 metre freestyle she again was eliminated in the first round after finishing 6th in her heat and 19th fastest overall. She won her heat of the 200 metre freestyle but did not advance to the next round after finishing 24th fastest overall. In the 4 × 100 metre freestyle relay Blume swam in a Danish quartet along with Mie Nielsen, Lotte Friis and Jeanette Ottesen; they qualified for the final, in which they finished sixth, setting a new Danish national record of 3:37.45. In the 4 × 100 metre medley relay Blume, Nielsen, Ottesen and Rikke Pedersen reached the final and finished seventh.

=== 2012 World Short Course Championships ===
Later in 2012 Blume won a gold medal at the World Short Course Championships in the 4 × 100 metre medley relay.

=== 2014 World Short Course Championships ===
At the 2014 World Short Course Championships, Blume, Nielsen, Pedersen and Ottesen won a gold medal and set a new world record as they won the 4 × 50 metre medley relay. The quartet also won the gold medal in the 4 × 100 metre medley relay. Blume also won a bronze medal in the 4 × 50 metre freestyle relay.

=== 2016 Summer Olympics ===
2016 Summer Olympics
Gold medal – first place	50 m freestyle	24.07 (NR)
Bronze medal – third place	4 × 100 m medley relay	3:55.01 (ER)

In 2016 Blume won the 50 metre freestyle event at the Danish open gala. She was subsequently selected to compete at the 2016 Summer Olympics in Rio de Janeiro, Brazil, where she won 50 metre freestyle and also competed in 100 metre freestyle, the 4 × 100 metre freestyle relay and the 4 × 100 metre medley relay where she anchored the medley and thereby contributed to the Danish team winning a bronze medal, just 0.01 seconds behind the Australian team who won the silver medal. Blume's gold medal was the first Olympic gold won by Denmark in swimming since Karen Harup at the 1948 Summer Olympics in London. Blume was Denmark's flag bearer at the closing ceremony.

=== 2017 ===
Blume participated in Edinburgh International 2017 and competed in the 50 metre freestyle event, finishing at 24.51 and winning the gold medal. She also won gold in the 100 metre freestyle with a time of 53.93. This was her first competition after the Rio Olympics. In April 2017 Blume participated in the Stockholm Swim Open; in the 50 metre freestyle event she finished second behind Sarah Sjöström with a time of 24.15.

=== 2021 ===
==== 2020 Summer Olympics ====
2020 Summer Olympics
Bronze medal – third place	50 m freestyle	24.21

At the 2020 Summer Olympics in Tokyo, Japan, postponed to 2021 due to the COVID-19 pandemic, Blume won a bronze medal in the women's 50 metre freestyle literally minutes after her significant other, Florent Manaudou, won a silver medal in the men's version of the race. Blume also competed in the women's 100 metre freestyle, where she placed tenth in the semifinals with a time of 53.26 seconds and did not advance to the final, and the women's 4 × 100 metre freestyle relay, where she helped the relay advance from the prelims heats to the final ranked seventh overall and contributed to the relay placing eighth in the final by swimming the lead-off leg in a time of 53.07 seconds.

==== Reality television debut ====
Following the 2020 Summer Olympics, Blume decided to capitalize on her Olympic fame by taking a break from swimming competition and transitioning to reality television by competing on the Danish dance show Vild med dans, where Danish celebrities compete against each other to earn the designation of top dancer of the group of celebrities who participate in the given season of the show. Her professional dance partner for the show was Morten Kjeldgaard, who previously won the show with his then-celebrity-partner Sarah Mahfoud, a professional boxer, in 2016. Blume's pasodoble on the dance floor with her partner in the eleventh week of competition, where she excelled dominantly in physical synchronization with her partner, along with her contribution in a group Charleston dance were good enough for her to advance to the semifinals of the competition. In the semifinals Blume advanced to the final with a score of 50 points, overcoming a wardrobe mishap during an Argentine tango where her garment just below hip level caught on and stuck to one of her partner's shirt buttons. In the grand finale, Blume and her partner placed third overall in the competition.

=== 2022: Retirement ===
Following a multiple month break from swimming competition after the conclusion of the Olympic Games in August 2021, Blume returned to training in January 2022. The next month, Blume started competing internationally for her new professional swim club CN Antibes, which is based in Antibes, France. Approximately nine months later, SwimSwam, Swimming World, NBC Sports, and FINA announced she had permanently retired from the sport of swimming with no intent of returning to competition.

Awards and achievements
Preceded by René Holten Poulsen	Danish Sports Name of the Year; 2016	Succeeded by Viktor Axelsen
