= Denmark at the 2011 World Aquatics Championships =

Sporting event delegation

Flag of Denmark

Denmark competed at the 2011 World Aquatics Championships in Shanghai, China between July 16 and 31, 2011.

== Medalists ==
Medal	Name	Sport	Event	Date
Gold	Lotte Friis	Swimming	Women's 1500m Freestyle	26 July
Gold	Jeanette Ottesen	Swimming	Women's 100m Freestyle	29 July
Silver	Lotte Friis	Swimming	Women's 800m Freestyle	30 July

== Swimming ==
Denmark qualified 6 swimmers.

Men

Athlete	Event	Heats		Semifinals		Final	
Athlete	Event	Time	Rank	Time	Rank	Time	Rank
Mads Glaesner	Men's 200m Freestyle	1:49.59	32	did not advance			
Mads Glaesner	Men's 400m Freestyle	3:48.41	12			did not advance	
Mads Glaesner	Men's 800m Freestyle	7:54.57	11			did not advance	
Mads Glaesner	Men's 1500m Freestyle	15:12.52	13			did not advance	

Women

Athlete	Event	Heats		Semifinals		Final	
Athlete	Event	Time	Rank	Time	Rank	Time	Rank
Jeanette Ottesen	Women's 50m Freestyle	25.23	13 Q	24.61	2 Q	24.67	6
Jeanette Ottesen	Women's 100m Freestyle	53.88	2 Q	53.88	4 Q	53.45	Gold medal
Jeanette Ottesen	Women's 50m Butterfly	25.88	2 Q	26.53	13	did not advance	
Jeanette Ottesen	Women's 100m Butterfly	58.32	7 Q	58.24	11	did not advance	
Pernille Blume	Women's 100m Freestyle	55.14	22	did not advance			
Pernille Blume	Women's 200m Freestyle	1:59.96	26	did not advance			
Lotte Friis	Women's 400m Freestyle	4:06.31	4 Q			4:04.68	5
Lotte Friis	Women's 800m Freestyle	8:23.07	2 Q			8:18.20	Silver medal
Lotte Friis	Women's 1500m Freestyle	16:00.47	1 Q			15:49.59	Gold medal
Mie Nielsen	Women's 50m Backstroke	28.89	18	did not advance			
Mie Nielsen	Women's 100m Backstroke	1:01.90	24	did not advance			
Rikke Pedersen	Women's 50m Breaststroke	31.65	14 Q	32.07	15	did not advance	
Rikke Pedersen	Women's 100m Breaststroke	1:07.80	7 Q	1:07.13	4 Q	1:07.28	6
Rikke Pedersen	Women's 200m Breaststroke	2:25.86	2 Q	2:24.80	5 Q	2:26.56	7
Pernille Blume; Mie Nielsen; Jeanette Ottesen; Lotte Friis	Women's 4 × 100 m Freestyle	3:39.48	8 Q			3:39.74	8
Mie Nielsen; Rikke Pedersen; Jeanette Ottesen; Pernille Blume	Women's 4 × 100 m Medley Relay	4:01.60	9			did not advance	
