= Jeanette Ottesen =

Danish swimmer (born 1987)

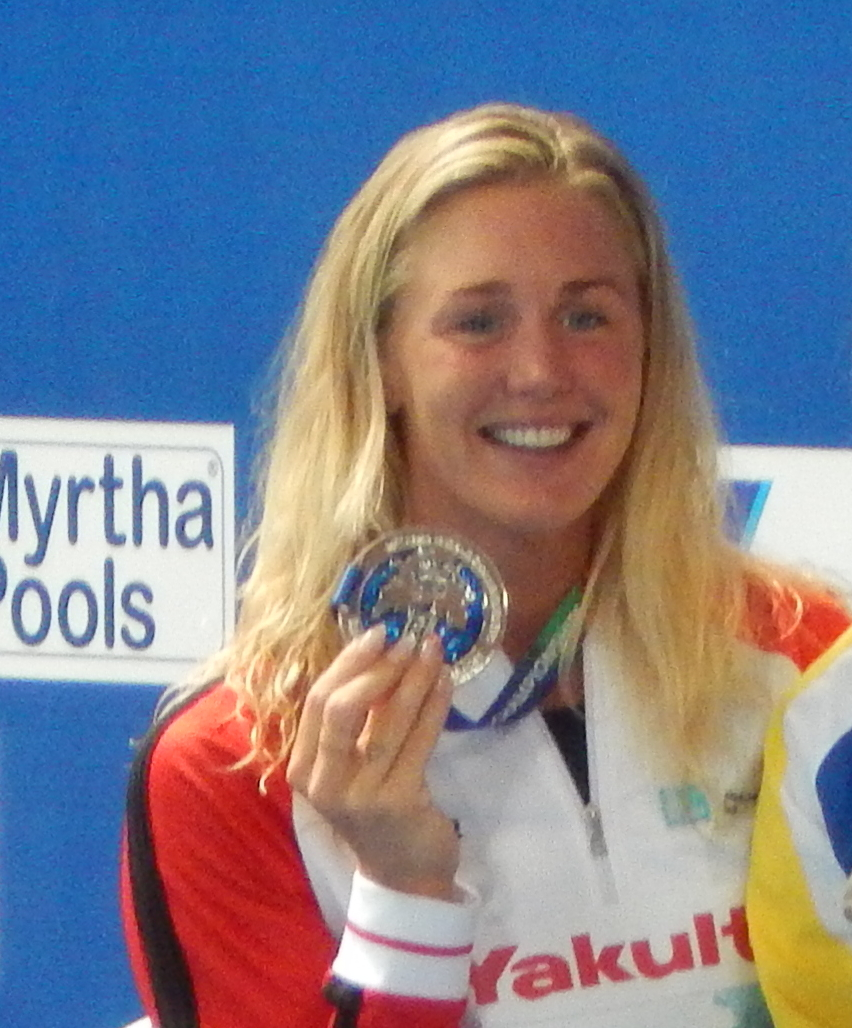

Personal information
- Full name: Jeanette Ottesen
- National team: Denmark
- Born: 30 December 1987 (age 38) Kongens Lyngby, Denmark
- Height: 1.78 m (5 ft 10 in)
- Weight: 70 kg (154 lb)

Sport
- Sport: Swimming
- Strokes: Freestyle, butterfly
- Club: Farum
Medal record
Women's swimming
Representing Denmark
Event	1st	2nd	3rd
Olympic Games	0	0	1
World Championships (LC)	2	2	0
World Championships (SC)	4	1	7
European Championships (LC)	2	4	2
European Championships (SC)	8	10	10
Total	16	17	20
Olympic Games
Bronze medal – third place	2016 Rio de Janeiro	4×100 m medley
World Championships (LC)
Gold medal – first place	2011 Shanghai	100 m freestyle
Gold medal – first place	2013 Barcelona	50 m butterfly
Silver medal – second place	2015 Kazan	50 m butterfly
Silver medal – second place	2015 Kazan	100 m butterfly
World Championships (SC)
Gold medal – first place	2012 Istanbul	4×100 m medley
Gold medal – first place	2014 Doha	4×50 m medley
Gold medal – first place	2014 Doha	4×100 m medley
Gold medal – first place	2016 Windsor	50 m butterfly
Silver medal – second place	2014 Doha	50 m butterfly
Bronze medal – third place	2010 Dubai	50 m butterfly
Bronze medal – third place	2012 Istanbul	50 m butterfly
Bronze medal – third place	2012 Istanbul	50 m freestyle
Bronze medal – third place	2012 Istanbul	4×100 m freestyle
Bronze medal – third place	2014 Doha	100 m butterfly
Bronze medal – third place	2014 Doha	4×50 m freestyle
Bronze medal – third place	2016 Windsor	4x50 m medley
European Championships (LC)
Gold medal – first place	2014 Berlin	100 m butterfly
Gold medal – first place	2014 Berlin	4×100 m medley
Silver medal – second place	2010 Budapest	50 m butterfly
Silver medal – second place	2014 Berlin	50 m butterfly
Silver medal – second place	2016 London	50 m butterfly
Silver medal – second place	2016 London	100 m butterfly
Bronze medal – third place	2014 Berlin	50 m freestyle
Bronze medal – third place	2016 London	50 m freestyle
European Championships (SC)
Gold medal – first place	2008 Rijeka	100 m butterfly
Gold medal – first place	2011 Szczecin	50 m butterfly
Gold medal – first place	2011 Szczecin	100 m butterfly
Gold medal – first place	2011 Szczecin	4×50 m medley
Gold medal – first place	2012 Chartres	50 m butterfly
Gold medal – first place	2012 Chartres	4×50 m freestyle
Gold medal – first place	2012 Chartres	4×50 m medley
Gold medal – first place	2013 Herning	4×50 m freestyle
Silver medal – second place	2008 Rijeka	100 m freestyle
Silver medal – second place	2008 Rijeka	50 m butterfly
Silver medal – second place	2011 Szczecin	50 m freestyle
Silver medal – second place	2011 Szczecin	100 m freestyle
Silver medal – second place	2011 Szczecin	4×50 m freestyle
Silver medal – second place	2012 Chartres	100 m freestyle
Silver medal – second place	2013 Herning	50 m butterfly
Silver medal – second place	2013 Herning	4×50 m medley
Silver medal – second place	2015 Netanya	50 m butterfly
Silver medal – second place	2015 Netanya	100 m butterfly
Bronze medal – third place	2008 Rijeka	50 m freestyle
Bronze medal – third place	2009 Istanbul	100 m freestyle
Bronze medal – third place	2009 Istanbul	100 m butterfly
Bronze medal – third place	2012 Chartres	100 m butterfly
Bronze medal – third place	2012 Chartres	50 m freestyle
Bronze medal – third place	2013 Herning	100 m butterfly
Bronze medal – third place	2015 Netanya	50 m freestyle
Bronze medal – third place	2019 Glasgow	50 m butterfly
Bronze medal – third place	2019 Glasgow	4×50 m freestyle
Bronze medal – third place	2019 Glasgow	4×50 m mixed medley

Jeanette Ottesen (born 30 December 1987) is a Danish competitive swimmer who participated at the 2004, 2008, 2012, 2016 and 2020 Summer Olympics. In total, she has won 50 international medals.

== Records ==
She currently holds the Danish record in the following:

Long course (50 m pool): 50 m butterfly, 100 m butterfly

Short course (25 m pool): 50 m butterfly, 100 m butterfly, 50 m freestyle, 100 m freestyle

== Career ==
Ottesen's won her first international title at the 2008 European Short Course Swimming Championships in Rijeka, Croatia in the 100 m butterfly. She has won two individual long course world titles; in 100 m freestyle in 2011 (shared with Aleksandra Gerasimenya from Belarus, and in the 50 m butterfly in 2013.

In June 2015, two months before the 2015 World Aquatics Championships in Kazan, Russia, Ottesen and her boyfriend Marco Loughran were attacked in a road rage incident in Copenhagen, during which she broke her finger. She recovered in time and won two silver medals at the world championships.

At the 2016 Summer Olympics in Rio de Janeiro, she won a bronze medal as a part of the 4 × 100 m medley relay alongside Rikke Møller Pedersen, Mie Ø. Nielsen and Pernille Blume. Here they also broke the European record with a time of 3:55.01.

In 2020, Ottesen was part of the NY Breakers in the International Swimming League.

She swims in the swimming club Kvik Kastrup and mainly concentrates on the short distances in freestyle and butterfly.

== Personal life ==
On 13 August 2011 she married Bobby William Gray, whom she had been dating for 8 years. The couple separated in 2013 and got divorced in 2014.

In February 2017 she got engaged to British swimmer Marco Loughran, whom she has been dating since 2014. On 30 June 2017 she announced, via her blog, that they are expecting their first child. The couple wed in a surprise ceremony, in Copenhagen, on 16 July 2017. In December 2022 she announced that she and Marco Loughran were getting divorced.

== See also ==
- Danish records in swimming

Awards and achievements
Preceded by Caroline Wozniacki	Danish Sports Name of the Year; 2011	Succeeded by Lasse Norman Hansen
