= Swimming at the 2019 World Aquatics Championships – 4 × 100 metre mixed medley relay =

4 × 100 metre mixed medley relay at the 2019 World Aquatics Championships
- Venue: Nambu University Municipal Aquatics Center
- Location: Gwangju, South Korea
- Dates: 24 July (heats and final)
- Competitors: 173 from 40 nations
- Teams: 40
- Winning time: 3:39.08

Medalists
gold medal	Mitch Larkin; Matthew Wilson; Emma McKeon; Cate Campbell; Minna Atherton; Matthew Temple; Bronte Campbell	Australia
silver medal	Ryan Murphy; Lilly King; Caeleb Dressel; Simone Manuel; Matt Grevers; Andrew Wilson; Kelsi Dahlia; Mallory Comerford	United States
bronze medal	Georgia Davies; Adam Peaty; James Guy; Freya Anderson; James Wilby	Great Britain

The 4 × 100 metre mixed medley relay competition at the 2019 World Championships was on 24 July 2019.

== Records ==
Prior to the competition, the existing world and championship records were as follows.

World record	United States	3:38.56	Budapest, Hungary	26 July 2017
Competition record	United States	3:38.56	Budapest, Hungary	26 July 2017

== Results ==
=== Heats ===
The heats were held on 24 July at 11:29.

Rank	Heat	Lane	Nation	Swimmers	Time	Notes
1	5	3	United States	Matt Grevers (52.75); Andrew Wilson (58.35); Kelsi Dahlia (57.35); Mallory Comerford (52.78)	3:41.23	Q
2	5	4	Australia	Minna Atherton (59.65); Matthew Wilson (58.84); Matthew Temple (51.41); Bronte Campbell (52.32)	3:42.22	Q
3	4	3	Russia	Daria Vaskina (59.92); Kirill Prigoda (58.62); Andrey Minakov (50.93); Maria Kameneva (53.83)	3:43.30	Q
4	4	4	Great Britain	Georgia Davies (1:00.51); James Wilby (58.16); James Guy (50.97); Freya Anderson (53.73)	3:43.37	Q
5	4	2	Canada	Kylie Masse (58.96); Richard Funk (59.80); Margaret MacNeil (57.33); Yuri Kisil (47.94)	3:44.03	Q
6	5	6	Italy	Margherita Panziera (1:00.19); Nicolò Martinenghi (59.50); Elena Di Liddo (56.83); Manuel Frigo (47.86)	3:44.38	Q, NR
7	4	6	Netherlands	Kira Toussaint (59.85); Arno Kamminga (59.51); Mathys Goosen (52.69); Femke Heemskerk (52.62)	3:44.67	Q
8	5	2	Germany	Laura Riedemann (59.95); Fabian Schwingenschlögl (59.62); Marius Kusch (51.86); Jessica Steiger (53.77)	3:45.20	Q
9	5	1	Belarus	Mikita Tsmyh (54.30); Ilya Shymanovich (58.20); Anastasiya Shkurdai (57.62); Aksana Dziamidava (55.76)	3:45.88	NR
10	4	8	Israel	Anastasia Gorbenko (1:00.79); Itay Goldfaden (1:01.13); Tomer Frankel (52.26); Andrea Murez (53.88)	3:48.06	NR
11	5	7	Poland	Alicja Tchórz (1:00.61); Jan Kałusowski (1:01.52); Konrad Czerniak (52.17); Katarzyna Wilk (53.91)	3:48.21	
12	4	0	Hungary	Richárd Bohus (54.33); Anna Sztankovics (1:08.92); Szebasztián Szabó (50.98); Katinka Hosszú (54.21)	3:48.44	NR
13	4	7	Switzerland	Roman Mityukov (54.07); Yannick Käser (1:00.30); Maria Ugolkova (58.85); Noémi Girardet (55.76)	3:48.98	
14	1	4	Denmark	Mie Nielsen (1:01.13); Tobias Bjerg (59.56); Viktor Bromer (53.23); Signe Bro (55.18)	3:49.10	NR
15	4	9	South Africa	Christopher Reid (54.73); Tatjana Schoenmaker (1:06.96); Ryan Coetzee (53.59); Erin Gallagher (54.62)	3:49.90	AF
16	3	4	Turkey	Ekaterina Avramova (1:02.53); Berkay Öğretir (1:00.39); Umitcan Gures (52.47); Selen Özbilen (55.10)	3:50.49	NR
17	4	1	South Korea	Lee Ju-ho (54.61); Moon Jae-kwon (1:00.97); Park Ye-rin (59.73); Jeong So-eun (55.58)	3:50.89	
18	5	0	Lithuania	Ugnė Mažutaitytė (1:02.73); Kotryna Teterevkova (1:08.73); Deividas Margevičius (52.22); Tadas Duškinas (49.70)	3:53.38	
19	3	3	Ireland	Conor Ferguson (54.61); Niamh Coyne (1:08.41); Ellen Walshe (1:00.89); Robert Powell (49.78)	3:53.69	
20	3	6	Singapore	Quah Zheng Wen (54.58); Christie Chue (1:09.96); Jonathan Tan (54.49); Cherlyn Yeoh (54.87)	3:53.90	
21	5	9	Estonia	Karl Johann Luht (55.86); Maria Romanjuk (1:09.50); Kregor Zirk (52.76); Aleksa Gold (56.05)	3:54.17	NR
22	3	7	Moldova	Tatiana Salcuțan (1:01.76); Tatiana Chișca (1:10.15); Alexei Sancov (52.74); Constantin Malachi (50.50)	3:55.15	NR
23	5	8	Hong Kong	Wong Toto Kwan To (1:02.49); Michael Ng (1:03.84); Nicholas Lim (54.31); Tam Hoi Lam (56.43)	3:57.07	
24	3	5	Chinese Taipei	Chuang Mu-lun (56.18); Lin Pei-wun (1:11.96); Chu Chen-ping (53.61); Huang Mei-chien (57.38)	3:59.13	
25	1	3	Jordan	Leedia Al-Safadi (1:10.10); Amro Al-Wir (1:02.74); Khader Baqlah (55.45); Talita Baqlah (1:00.25)	4:08.54	
26	3	0	Kenya	Issa Abdulla Hemed Mohamed (1:02.91); Maria Brunlehner (1:16.42); Emily Muteti (1:04.13); Danilo Rosafio (53.37)	4:16.83	
27	3	8	Angola	Salvador Gordo (1:02.96); Daniel Francisco (1:09.76); Lia Lima (1:05.35); Catarina Sousa (59.31)	4:17.38	
28	2	6	Madagascar	Idealy Tendrinavalona (1:07.85); Jonathan Raharvel (1:08.03); Heriniavo Rasolonjatovo (1:01.81); Tiana Rabarijaona (1:00.65)	4:18.34	
29	2	4	Papua New Guinea	Samuel Seghers (1:02.38); Ryan Maskelyne (1:04.22); Georgia-Leigh Vele (1:09.50); Judith Meauri (1:02.89)	4:18.99	
30	2	0	Armenia	Ani Poghosyan (1:13.23); Varsenik Manucharyan (1:17.48); Artur Barseghyan (56.35); Vahan Mkhitaryan (52.74)	4:19.80	NR
31	2	2	Ghana	Jason Arthur (56.52); Kaya Forson (1:24.22); Abeiku Jackson (55.69); Zaira Forson (1:04.97)	4:21.40	
32	2	8	Micronesia	Kaleo Kihleng (1:06.84); Tasi Limtiaco (1:04.70); Margie Winter (1:10.68); Taeyanna Adams (1:07.94)	4:30.16	
33	2	9	Nigeria	Ifeakachuku Nmor (1:12.25); Chinelo Iyadi (1:21.39); Abiola Ogunbanwo (58.26); Yellow Yeiyah (1:03.69)	4:35.59	
34	2	7	Tonga	Finau Ohuafi (1:04.93); Amini Fonua (1:08.23); Charissa Panuve (1:19.82); Noelani Day (1:06.93)	4:39.91	NR
35	1	5	Northern Mariana Islands	Juhn Tenorio (1:04.40); Lennosuke Suzuki (1:22.52); Aika Watanabe (1:18.18); Jin Ju Thompson (1:11.10)	4:56.20	
36	2	3	Maldives	Aishath Sausan (1:18.66); Sajina Aishath (1:28.34); Mubal Azzam Ibrahim (1:10.44); Imaan Ali (59.35)	4:56.79	NR
	3	2	Mexico	Miriam Guevara (1:05.50); Miguel Chavez; María Jiménez; Horus Briseño	DSQ	
	3	9	Senegal	Sophia Diagne (1:09.71); Abdoul Niane; Steven Aimable; Jeanne Boutbien	DSQ	
	4	5	Japan	Natsumi Sakai (1:00.08); Yasuhiro Koseki (59.50); Naoki Mizunuma (51.85); Rika Omoto	DSQ	
	5	5	China	Li Guangyuan (53.78); Wang Lizhuo; Wang Yichun; Zhu Menghui	DSQ	
	1	2	Philippines		DNS	
	1	6	Panama		DNS	
	2	1	Malaysia		DNS	
	2	5	Uganda		DNS	
	3	1	Iceland		DNS	

=== Final ===
The final was held on 24 July at 21:50.

Rank	Lane	Nation	Swimmers	Time	Notes
1st place, gold medalist(s)	5	Australia	Mitch Larkin (53.47); Matthew Wilson (58.37); Emma McKeon (56.14); Cate Campbell (51.10)	3:39.08	
2nd place, silver medalist(s)	4	United States	Ryan Murphy (52.46); Lilly King (1:04.94); Caeleb Dressel (49.33); Simone Manuel (52.37)	3:39.10	
3rd place, bronze medalist(s)	6	Great Britain	Georgia Davies (59.25); Adam Peaty (57.73); James Guy (50.72); Freya Anderson (52.98)	3:40.68	
4	3	Russia	Evgeny Rylov (51.97); Kirill Prigoda (58.22); Svetlana Chimrova (57.79); Maria Kameneva (52.80)	3:40.78	NR
5	2	Canada	Kylie Masse (58.97); Richard Funk (59.51); Margaret MacNeil (56.74); Yuri Kisil (47.84)	3:43.06	
6	7	Italy	Simone Sabbioni (53.50); Fabio Scozzoli (59.70); Elena Di Liddo (57.31); Federica Pellegrini (52.76)	3:43.27	NR
7	8	Germany	Laura Riedemann (1:00.01); Fabian Schwingenschlögl (59.12); Marius Kusch (51.37); Jessica Steiger (54.57)	3:45.07	
	1	Netherlands	Kira Toussaint; Arno Kamminga; Mathys Goosen; Femke Heemskerk	DSQ	
