= Tonga at the 2025 World Aquatics Championships =

- Flag of Tonga
- World Aquatics code: TGA
- National federation: Tonga Swimming Association

in Singapore
- Competitors: 2 in 1 sport
- Medals: Gold 0 Silver 0 Bronze 0 Total 0

World Aquatics Championships appearances
- 1973; 1975; 1978; 1982; 1986; 1991; 1994; 1998; 2001; 2003; 2005; 2007; 2009; 2011; 2013; 2015; 2017; 2019; 2022; 2023; 2024; 2025

Tonga competed at the 2025 World Aquatics Championships in Singapore from July 11 to August 3, 2025.

== Competitors ==
The following is the list of competitors in the Championships.

Sport	Men	Women	Total
Swimming	1	1	2
Total	1	1	2

== Swimming ==
Tonga entered 2 swimmers.

Men

Athlete	Event	Heat		Semi-final		Final	
Athlete	Event	Time	Rank	Time	Rank	Time	Rank
Finau Ohuafi	100 m freestyle	53.76	77	Did not advance			
Finau Ohuafi	50 m butterfly	25.53	65	Did not advance			

Women

Athlete	Event	Heat		Semi-final		Final	
Athlete	Event	Time	Rank	Time	Rank	Time	Rank
Charissa Panuve	50 m freestyle	29.69	82	Did not advance			
Charissa Panuve	100 m freestyle	1:05.30	74	Did not advance			
