= Kenya at the 2025 World Aquatics Championships =

- Flag of Kenya
- World Aquatics code: KEN
- National federation: Kenya Swimming Federation

in Singapore
- Competitors: 12 in 2 sports
- Medals: Gold 0 Silver 0 Bronze 0 Total 0

World Aquatics Championships appearances
- 1973; 1975; 1978; 1982; 1986; 1991; 1994; 1998; 2001; 2003; 2005; 2007; 2009; 2011; 2013; 2015; 2017; 2019; 2022–2023; 2024; 2025

Kenya competed at the 2025 World Aquatics Championships in Singapore from July 11 to August 3, 2025.

== Competitors ==
The following is the list of competitors in the Championships.

Sport	Men	Women	Total
Open water swimming	5	3	8
Swimming	2	2	4
Total	7	5	12

== Open water swimming ==
Men

Athlete	Event	Heat		Semi-final		Final	
Athlete	Event	Time	Rank	Time	Rank	Time	Rank
Samir Bachelani	Men's 10 km	—				Did not finish	
Igbaal Bayusuf	Men's 5 km	—				Did not finish	
Aryan Joseph	Men's 3 km knockout sprints	23:33.8	31	Did not advance			
Hamza Kassim	Men's 5 km	—				Did not finish	
Swaleh Talib	Men's 3 km knockout sprints	24:26.7	32	Did not advance			
Swaleh Talib	Men's 10 km	—				Did not finish	

Women

Athlete	Event	Heat		Semi-final		Final	
Athlete	Event	Time	Rank	Time	Rank	Time	Rank
Maria Bianchi	Women's 5 km	—				Did not finish	
Sera Mawira	Women's 3 km knockout sprints	26:21.0	28	Did not advance			
Victoria Okumu	Women's 3 km knockout sprints	Did not start		Did not advance			
Victoria Okumu	Women's 5 km	—				Did not finish	

Mixed

Athlete	Event	Time	Rank
Samir Bachelani; Aryan Joseph; Sera Mawira; Maria Bianchi	Team relay	1:37:42.7	23

== Swimming ==
Kenya entered 4 swimmers.

Men

Athlete	Event	Heat		Semi-final		Final	
Athlete	Event	Time	Rank	Time	Rank	Time	Rank
Haniel Kudwoli	50 m breaststroke	29.65	63	Did not advance			
Haniel Kudwoli	100 m breaststroke	1:04.92 NR	56	Did not advance			
Stephen Nyoike	50 m butterfly	26.01	73	Did not advance			
Stephen Nyoike	100 m butterfly	57.51	64	Did not advance			

Women

Athlete	Event	Heat		Semi-final		Final	
Athlete	Event	Time	Rank	Time	Rank	Time	Rank
Sara Mose	50 m freestyle	25.96	41	Did not advance			
Sara Mose	100 m freestyle	57.46	40	Did not advance			
Imara Thorpe	50 m butterfly	27.88	46	Did not advance			
Imara Thorpe	100 m butterfly	1:01.64	39	Did not advance			

Mixed

Athlete	Event	Heat		Final	
Athlete	Event	Time	Rank	Time	Rank
Stephen Nyoike; Haniel Kudwoli; Imara Thorpe; Sara Mose	4 × 100 m freestyle relay	3:43.70	23	Did not advance	
Stephen Nyoike; Haniel Kudwoli; Imara Thorpe; Sara Mose	4 × 100 m medley relay	4:07.72 NR	27	Did not advance	
