= Tonga at the 2023 World Aquatics Championships =

- Flag of Tonga
- World Aquatics code: TGA
- National federation: Tonga Swimming Association

in Fukuoka, Japan
- Competitors: 4 in 1 sport
- Medals: Gold 0 Silver 0 Bronze 0 Total 0

World Aquatics Championships appearances
- 1973; 1975; 1978; 1982; 1986; 1991; 1994; 1998; 2001; 2003; 2005; 2007; 2009; 2011; 2013; 2015; 2017; 2019; 2022; 2023; 2024; 2025

Tonga competed at the 2023 World Aquatics Championships in Fukuoka, Japan from 14 to 30 July.

== Swimming ==
Tonga entered 4 swimmers.

Men

Athlete	Event	Heat		Semifinal		Final	
Athlete	Event	Time	Rank	Time	Rank	Time	Rank
Finau Ohuafi	100 metre freestyle	54.56	94	Did not advance			
Finau Ohuafi	50 metre butterfly	25.85	65	Did not advance			
Kapeli Siua	50 metre freestyle	25.83	94	Did not advance			
Kapeli Siua	50 metre backstroke	29.96	58	Did not advance			

Women

Athlete	Event	Heat		Semifinal		Final	
Athlete	Event	Time	Rank	Time	Rank	Time	Rank
Noelani Day	50 metre freestyle	28.24	69	Did not advance			
Noelani Day	50 metre backstroke	35.37	58	Did not advance			
Charissa Panuve	100 metre freestyle	1:03.51	64	Did not advance			
Charissa Panuve	200 metre freestyle	2:20.00	63	Did not advance			

Mixed

Athlete	Event	Heat		Final	
Athlete	Event	Time	Rank	Time	Rank
Kapeli Siua; Noelani Day; Finau Ohuafi; Charissa Panuve	4 × 100 m medley relay	4:39.42	40	Did not advance	
