= Nigeria at the 2025 World Aquatics Championships =

- Flag of Nigeria
- World Aquatics code: NGR
- National federation: Nigeria Aquatics Federation

in Singapore
- Competitors: 4 in 1 sport
- Medals: Gold 0 Silver 0 Bronze 0 Total 0

World Aquatics Championships appearances
- 1973; 1975; 1978; 1982; 1986; 1991; 1994; 1998; 2001; 2003; 2005; 2007; 2009; 2011; 2013; 2015; 2017; 2019; 2022; 2023; 2024; 2025

Nigeria is competing at the 2025 World Aquatics Championships in Singapore from 11 July to 3 August 2025.

== Competitors ==
The following is the list of competitors in the Championships.

Sport	Men	Women	Total
Swimming	2	2	4
Total	2	2	4

== Swimming ==
Men

Athlete	Event	Heat		Semifinal		Final	
Athlete	Event	Time	Rank	Time	Rank	Time	Rank
Colins Obi Ebingha	100 m freestyle	51.55	61	Did not advance			
Colins Obi Ebingha	50 m butterfly	24.45	49	Did not advance			
Clinton Opute	50 m freestyle	23.79	65	Did not advance			
Clinton Opute	100 m butterfly	59.29	72	Did not advance			

Women

Athlete	Event	Heat		Semifinal		Final	
Athlete	Event	Time	Rank	Time	Rank	Time	Rank
Timipame-Ere Akiayefa	50 m freestyle	28.16	66	Did not advance			
Timipame-Ere Akiayefa	50 m butterfly	28.21 NR	47	Did not advance			
Adaku Nwandu	50 m freestyle	27.23	54	Did not advance			
Adaku Nwandu	100 m freestyle	1:00.89	59	Did not advance			
