= List of Tongan records in swimming =

The Tongan records in swimming are the fastest ever performances of swimmers from Tonga, which are recognised and ratified by the Tonga Swimming Association.

All records were set in finals unless noted otherwise.

== Long Course (50 m) ==
=== Men ===
| Event | Time | | Name | Club | Date | Meet | Location | Ref |
|---|---|---|---|---|---|---|---|---|
| 50m freestyle | 23.99 | | Amini Fonua | - | 2010 | - | | |
| 100m freestyle | 52.21 | h | Ifalemi Sau-Paea | Tonga | 5 August 2015 | World Championships | Kazan, Russia | |
| 200m freestyle | 2:12.61 | h | Tongli Panuve | Tonga | 24 July 2017 | World Championships | Budapest, Hungary | |
| 400m freestyle | 4:48.71 | h | Tongli Panuve | Tonga | 8 July 2015 | Pacific Games | Port Moresby, Papua New Guinea | |
| 800m freestyle | 9:39.54 | † | Tongli Panuve | Tonga | 11 July 2015 | Pacific Games | Port Moresby, Papua New Guinea | |
| 1500m freestyle | 18:26.37 | | Tongli Panuve | Tonga | 11 July 2015 | Pacific Games | Port Moresby, Papua New Guinea | |
| 50m backstroke | 27.91 | | Finau Ohuafi | Thanyapura UWCT Mantares | 23 October 2020 | Thailand Age Group Championships | Bangkok, Thailand | |
| 100m backstroke | 1:02.05 | | Finau Ohuafi | Thanyapura UWCT Mantares | 24 October 2020 | Thailand Age Group Championships | Bangkok, Thailand | |
| 200m backstroke | 2:38.29 | | Tongli Panuve | Tonga | 22 May 2014 | Oceania Championships | Auckland, New Zealand | |
| 50m breaststroke | 28.20 | | Amini Fonua | Tonga | 8 July 2015 | Pacific Games | Port Moresby, Papua New Guinea | |
| 100m breaststroke | 1:02.95 | | Amini Fonua | Tonga | 6 July 2015 | Pacific Games | Port Moresby, Papua New Guinea | |
| 200m breaststroke | 2:20.27 | | Amini Fonua | Tonga | 9 July 2015 | Pacific Games | Port Moresby, Papua New Guinea | |
| 50m butterfly | 24.93 | | Amini Fonua | - | 2011 | - | | |
| 100m butterfly | 55.62 | h | Ifalemi Sau-Paea | Tonga | 27 July 2014 | Commonwealth Games | Glasgow, Great Britain | |
| 200m butterfly | 2:07.00 | | Ifalemi Sau-Paea | | | | | |
| 200m individual medley | 2:09.96 | | Ifalemi Sau-Paea | - | 2011 | | | |
| 400m individual medley | | | | | | | | |
| 4×100m freestyle relay | 3:42.76 | | Finau Ohuafi (56.27); Jazz Teuhema (55.52); Kapelieli Siua (55.60); Alan Uhi (55.37) | Tonga | 20 November 2023 | Pacific Games | Honiara, Solomon Islands | |
| 4×200m freestyle relay | | | | | | | | |
| 4×100m medley relay | | | | | | | | |

Legend: # – Record awaiting ratification by Tonga Swimming Association; WR – World record; OC – Oceanian record;
Records not set in finals: h – heat; sf – semifinal; r – relay 1st leg; rh – relay heat 1st leg; b – B final; † – en route to final mark; so – swim-off; tt – time trial

=== Women ===
| Event | Time | | Name | Club | Date | Meet | Location | Ref |
|---|---|---|---|---|---|---|---|---|
| 50m freestyle | 27.83 | | Irene Prescott | - | 2016 | | | |
| 100m freestyle | 1:02.31 | | Charissa Panuve | Tonga | 12 June 2024 | Singaporean Championships | Singapore, Singapore | |
| 200m freestyle | 2:16.70 | | Ofa Ngaloafe Fa | Olympus Aquatics | 19 July 2019 | Utah Championships | Salt Lake City, United States | |
| 400m freestyle | 5:00.32 | | Ofa Ngaloafe Fa | Olympus Aquatics | 18 July 2019 | Utah Championships | Salt Lake City, United States | |
| 800m freestyle | 10:52.34 | † | Charissa Panuve | Tonga | 9 April 2023 | Thailand Age Group Championships | Bangkok, Thailand | |
| 1500m freestyle | 20:39.76 | | Charissa Panuve | Tonga | 9 April 2023 | Thailand Age Group Championships | Bangkok, Thailand | |
| 50m backstroke | 31.54 | | Irene Prescott | - | 2016 | | | |
| 100m backstroke | 1:10.63 | | Irene Prescott | - | 2016 | | | |
| 200m backstroke | 2:45.62 | | Ofa Ngaloafe Fa | Malolo Swim Club | 10 May 2019 | Fiji Age Group Championships | Suva, Fiji | |
| 50 m breaststroke | 35.86 | h | Vaoahi Afu | Tonga | 27 July 2026 | Commonwealth Games | Glasgow, United Kingdom | |
| 100 m breaststroke | 1:20.66 | h | Vaoahi Afu | Tonga | 25 July 2026 | Commonwealth Games | Glasgow, United Kingdom | |
| 200 m breaststroke | 3:08.59 | | Vaoahi Afu | Malolo Swim Club | 7 March 2020 | ASA Age Group Championships | Auckland, New Zealand | |
| 50m butterfly | 29.87 | | Irene Prescott | - | 2016 | | | |
| 100m butterfly | 1:13.88 | | Ofa Ngaloafe Fa | Malolo Swim Club | 10 May 2019 | Fiji Age Group Championships | Suva, Fiji | |
| 200m butterfly | 2:52.53 | h | Charissa Panuve | Tonga | 9 April 2023 | Thailand Age Group Championships | Bangkok, Thailand | |
| 200m individual medley | 2:46.58 | | Ofa Ngaloafe Fa | Malolo Swim Club | 10 May 2019 | Fiji Age Group Championships | Suva, Fiji | |
| 400m individual medley | | | | | | | | |
| 4×100m freestyle relay | | | | | | | | |
| 4×200m freestyle relay | | | | | | | | |
| 4×100m medley relay | | | | | | | | |

Legend: # – Record awaiting ratification by Tonga Swimming Association; WR – World record; OC – Oceanian record;
Records not set in finals: h – heat; sf – semifinal; r – relay 1st leg; rh – relay heat 1st leg; b – B final; † – en route to final mark; so – swim-off; tt – time trial

=== Mixed relay ===
| Event | Time | | Name | Club | Date | Meet | Location | Ref |
|---|---|---|---|---|---|---|---|---|
| 4×50 m freestyle relay | 1:49.61 | | Noelani Day; Alexander Sugar; Hinemoa Fonua; Finau Ohuafi | Tonga | 12 July 2019 | Pacific Games | Apia, Samoa | |
| 4×100 m freestyle relay | 4:08.19 | h | Finau Ohuafi (56.67); Noelani Day (1:06.50); Charissa Panuve (1:08.37); Amini Fonua (56.65) | Tonga | 27 July 2019 | World Championships | Gwangju, South Korea | |
| 4×50 m medley relay | 2:06.18 | | | Tonga | 13 July 2019 | Pacific Games | Apia, Samoa | |
| 4×100 m medley relay | 4:39.91 | h | Finau Ohuafi (1:04.93); Amini Fonua (1:08.23); Charissa Panuve (1:19.82); Noelani Day (1:06.93) | Tonga | 24 July 2019 | World Championships | Gwangju, South Korea | |

Legend: # – Record awaiting ratification by Tonga Swimming Association; WR – World record; OC – Oceanian record;
Records not set in finals: h – heat; so – swim-off

== Short Course (25 m) ==
=== Men ===
| Event | Time | | Name | Club | Date | Meet | Location | Ref |
|---|---|---|---|---|---|---|---|---|
| 50m freestyle | 24.21 | | Finau Ohuafi | Tonga | 21 October 2022 | Thailand Championships | Samut Prakan, Thailand | |
| 100m freestyle | 52.82 | h | Finau Ohuafi | Tonga | 20 December 2021 | World Championships | Abu Dhabi, United Arab Emirates | |
| 200m freestyle | 2:00.76 | | Finau Ohuafi | Tonga | 22 October 2022 | Thailand Championships | Samut Prakan, Thailand | |
| 400 m freestyle | | | | | | | | |
| 800 m freestyle | | | | | | | | |
| 1500 m freestyle | | | | | | | | |
| 50m backstroke | 26.14 | | Amini Fonua | - | 22 July 2010 | Auckland Winter Championships | Auckland, New Zealand | |
| 100m backstroke | 57.80 | | Finau Ohuafi | Tonga | 23 October 2022 | Thailand Championships | Samut Prakan, Thailand | |
| 200m backstroke | 3:15.35 | | Alan Uhi | Malolo | 28 October 2017 | Fiji Age Group Nationals | Suva, Fiji | |
| 50m breaststroke | 28.35 | h | Amini Fonua | Tonga | 6 December 2014 | World Championships | Doha, Qatar | |
| 100m breaststroke | 1:15.67 | | Finau Ohuafi | - | 30 May 2020 | Thanyapura Open Swim League | Phuket, Thailand | |
| 200m breaststroke | 2:55.09 | | Siutaka Fatongia | - | 20 July 2019 | - | Manurewa, New Zealand | |
| 50m butterfly | 24.50 | h | Amini Fonua | Tonga | 14 December 2018 | World Championships | Hangzhou, China | |
| 100m butterfly | 59.73 | | Finau Ohuafi | Tonga | 22 October 2022 | Thailand Championships | Samut Prakan, Thailand | |
| 200m butterfly | | | | | | | | |
| 100m individual medley | 1:06.48 | h | Tongli Panuve | Tonga | 8 December 2016 | World Championships | Windsor, Canada | |
| 200m individual medley | 2:13.61 | | Amini Fonua | Tonga | 23 October 2022 | Thailand Championships | Samut Prakan, Thailand | |
| 400 m individual medley | | | | | | | | |
| 4×50 m freestyle relay | | | | | | | | |
| 4×100 m freestyle relay | | | | | | | | |
| 4×200 m freestyle relay | | | | | | | | |
| 4×50 m medley relay | | | | | | | | |
| 4×100 m medley relay | | | | | | | | |

Legend: # – Record awaiting ratification by Tonga Swimming Association; WR – World record; OC – Oceanian record;
Records not set in finals: h – heat; sf – semifinal; r – relay 1st leg; rh – relay heat 1st leg; b – B final; † – en route to final mark; so – swim-off; tt – time trial

=== Women ===
| Event | Time | | Name | Club | Date | Meet | Location | Ref |
|---|---|---|---|---|---|---|---|---|
| 50 m freestyle | 28.14 | h | Noelani Day | Tonga | 20 December 2021 | World Championships | Abu Dhabi, United Arab Emirates | |
| 100m freestyle | 1:03.49 | h, † | Irene Prescott | Tonga | 4 December 2014 | World Championships | Doha, Qatar | |
| 200m freestyle | 2:22.21 | | Ofa Ngaloafe Fa | Malolo Swim Club | 28 September 2019 | Fiji Nationals | Suva, Fiji | |
| 400m freestyle | 5:15.87 | h | Charissa Panuve | Tonga | 14 December 2012 | World Championships | Istanbul, Turkey | |
| 800 m freestyle | | | | | | | | |
| 1500 m freestyle | | | | | | | | |
| 50m backstroke | 31.13 | h | Carolann Faeamani | Tonga | 12 December 2024 | World Championships | Budapest, Hungary | |
| 100m backstroke | 1:13.52 | | Hinemoa Fonua | Tonga | 7 September 2015 | Commonwealth Youth Games | Apia, Samoa | |
| 200m backstroke | 2:38.91 | | Ofa Ngaloafe Fa | - | 12 January 2019 | Keams Holiday Open Invite | United States | |
| 50m breaststroke | 38.45 | | Vaoahi Afu | - | 10 January 2019 | Anthony Moses Classic | Auckland, New Zealand | |
| 100m breaststroke | 1:25.29 | | Vaoahi Afu | - | 9 September 2019 | Anchor Aims Games | Tauranga, New Zealand | |
| 200m breaststroke | 3:05.54 | | Vaoahi Afu | - | 8 March 2019 | Victorian Age Group Championships | Melbourne, Australia | |
| 50m butterfly | 30.55 | | Hinemoa Fonua | - | 11 August 2015 | New Zealand Championships | Auckland, New Zealand | |
| 100m butterfly | 1:11.36 | | Ofa Ngaloafe Fa | - | 12 January 2019 | Keams Holiday Open Invite | United States | |
| 200 m butterfly | | | | | | | | |
| 100m individual medley | 1:11.67 | | Hinemoa Fonua | 17 July 2015 | {{{date}}} | ASA Winter Championships | Auckland, New Zealand | |
| 200m individual medley | 2:45.34 | | Hinemoa Fonua | July 2015 | {{{date}}} | ASA Winter Championships | Auckland, New Zealand | |
| 400 m individual medley | | | | | | | | |
| 4×50 m freestyle relay | | | | | | | | |
| 4×100 m freestyle relay | | | | | | | | |
| 4×200 m freestyle relay | | | | | | | | |
| 4×50 m medley relay | | | | | | | | |
| 4×100 m medley relay | | | | | | | | |

Legend: # – Record awaiting ratification by Tonga Swimming Association; WR – World record; OC – Oceanian record;
Records not set in finals: h – heat; sf – semifinal; r – relay 1st leg; rh – relay heat 1st leg; b – B final; † – en route to final mark; so – swim-off; tt – time trial

=== Mixed relay ===
| Event | Time | | Name | Club | Date | Meet | Location | Ref |
|---|---|---|---|---|---|---|---|---|
| 4×50m freestyle relay | 1:48.42 | h | Charissa Panuve (30.17); Finau Ohuafi (25.48); Noelani Day (29.40); Amini Fonua (23.37) | Tonga | 12 December 2018 | World Championships | Hangzhou, China | |
| 4×50m medley relay | 1:59.74 | h | Finau Ohuafi (29.22); Amini Fonua (29.09); Charissa Panuve (25.10); Noelani Day (29.07) | Tonga | 13 December 2018 | World Championships | Hangzhou, China | |

Legend: # – Record awaiting ratification by Tonga Swimming Association;
Records not set in finals: h – heat; so – swim-off
