= Tonga at the 2022 World Aquatics Championships =

- Flag of Tonga
- World Aquatics code: TGA
- National federation: Tonga Swimming Association

in Budapest, Hungary
- Competitors: 2 in 1 sport
- Medals: Gold 0 Silver 0 Bronze 0 Total 0

World Aquatics Championships appearances
- 1973; 1975; 1978; 1982; 1986; 1991; 1994; 1998; 2001; 2003; 2005; 2007; 2009; 2011; 2013; 2015; 2017; 2019; 2022; 2023; 2024; 2025

Tonga competed at the 2022 World Aquatics Championships in Budapest, Hungary from 18 June to 3 July.

== Swimming ==
Tongan swimmers have achieved qualifying standards in the following events.

Athlete	Event	Heat		Semifinal		Final	
Athlete	Event	Time	Rank	Time	Rank	Time	Rank
Finau Ohuafi	Men's 100 m freestyle	54.95	84	did not advance			
Finau Ohuafi	Men's 100 m butterfly	59.83	59	did not advance			
Charissa Panuve	Women's 200 m freestyle	2:22.93	38	did not advance			
Charissa Panuve	Women's 100 m butterfly	1:15.01	30	did not advance			
