= 2018 FINA World Swimming Championships (25 m) – Men's 50 metre freestyle =

Men's 50 metre freestyle at the 2018 FINA World Swimming Championships (25 m)
- Venue: Hangzhou Sports Park Stadium
- Dates: 13 December (heats and semifinals); 14 December (final)
- Competitors: 128 from 117 nations
- Winning time: 20.33

Medalists
gold medal	Vladimir Morozov	Russia
silver medal	Caeleb Dressel	United States
bronze medal	Brad Tandy	South Africa

The men's 50 metre freestyle competition of the 2018 FINA World Swimming Championships (25 m) was held on 13 and 14 December 2018.

== Records ==
Prior to the competition, the existing world and championship records were as follows.

	Name	Nation	Time	Location	Date
World record Championship record	Florent Manaudou	France	20.26	Doha	5 December 2014

== Results ==
=== Heats ===
The heats were started on 13 December at 10:17.

Rank	Heat	Lane	Name	Nationality	Time	Notes
1	13	9	Caeleb Dressel	United States	20.62	Q, NR
2	13	4	Vladimir Morozov	Russia	20.89	Q
3	13	3	Cameron McEvoy	Australia	20.97	Q
4	12	4	Ben Proud	United Kingdom	20.98	Q
5	12	7	Simonas Bilis	Lithuania	21.10	Q, NR
6	12	6	Jesse Puts	Netherlands	21.19	Q
7	13	5	Michael Andrew	United States	21.25	Q
8	11	4	Paweł Juraszek	Poland	21.30	Q
9	13	0	Sergii Shevtsov	Ukraine	21.31	Q
10	12	2	Katsumi Nakamura	Japan	21.33	Q
11	13	8	Kosuke Matsui	Japan	21.34	Q
12	11	7	Lorenzo Zazzeri	Italy	21.35	Q
13	9	6	Ali Khalafalla	Egypt	21.38	Q, NR
13	13	6	Brad Tandy	South Africa	21.38	Q
15	11	5	César Cielo	Brazil	21.39	Q
16	11	3	Kristian Golomeev	Greece	21.40	QSO
16	11	6	Maksim Lobanovskij	Hungary	21.40	QSO
18	12	3	Evgeny Sedov	Russia	21.48	
19	13	1	Cameron Jones	Australia	21.51	
20	11	2	Oussama Sahnoune	Algeria	21.53	
21	13	2	Ari-Pekka Liukkonen	Finland	21.57	
22	12	1	Andrea Vergani	Italy	21.61	
22	12	5	Konrad Czerniak	Poland	21.61	
24	11	1	Huseyin Sakci	Turkey	21.66	
25	10	0	Christoffer Carlsen	Sweden	21.67	
26	13	7	Matheus Santana	Brazil	21.71	
27	9	3	Daniel Hunter	New Zealand	21.73	
28	12	8	Damian Wierling	Germany	21.77	
29	10	6	Niksa Stojkovski	Norway	21.78	NR
29	12	0	Stan Pijnenburg	Netherlands	21.78	
31	9	9	Miguel Nascimento	Portugal	21.81	
32	9	4	Mislav Sever	Croatia	21.82	
33	11	8	Douglas Erasmus	South Africa	21.85	
34	12	9	Dylan Carter	Trinidad and Tobago	21.98	
35	10	3	Daniel Zaitsev	Estonia	22.01	
35	10	8	Bradley Vincent	Mauritius	22.01	
37	10	5	Tadas Duškinas	Lithuania	22.02	
38	10	2	Hou Yuije	China	22.07	
38	11	0	Artsiom Machekin	Belarus	22.07	
40	8	2	Cristian Quintero	Venezuela	22.09	
41	9	1	Wu Chun-feng	Chinese Taipei	22.10	
41	10	9	Ben Hockin	Paraguay	22.10	
43	2	6	Alexandr Varakin	Kazakhstan	22.11	
44	10	1	Guido Buscaglia	Argentina	22.19	
45	11	9	Kemal Arda Gürdal	Turkey	22.25	
46	9	2	Adi Mešetović	Bosnia and Herzegovina	22.28	
46	9	5	Ivo Staub	Switzerland	22.28	
48	10	7	Julien Henx	Luxembourg	22.29	
49	2	7	Oliver Elliot	Chile	22.41	
50	8	4	Oleksandr Loginov	Canada	22.43	
51	8	6	Artur Barseghyan	Armenia	22.44	NR
52	8	3	Virdhawal Khade	India	22.49	
53	9	0	Andrew James Digby	Thailand	22.50	
54	9	8	Dado Fenrir Jasminuson	Iceland	22.51	
55	9	7	Renzo Tjon-A-Joe	Suriname	22.52	
56	8	7	George-Adrian Ratiu	Romania	22.65	
57	7	8	Sina Gholampour	Iran	22.75	
58	8	0	Giorgi Biganishvili	Georgia	22.86	NR
59	7	5	Sebastian Arispe	Peru	22.98	
60	8	5	Abdoul Niane	Senegal	22.99	NR
61	7	1	Jhonny Pérez	Dominican Republic	23.00	
62	7	4	Jean-Luc Zephir	Saint Lucia	23.10	
63	8	1	Souhail Hamouchane	Morocco	23.15	
64	8	9	Isaac Beitia Lasso	Panama	23.21	
65	8	8	Anthony Barbar	Lebanon	23.30	
66	7	3	Noah Al-Khulaifi	Qatar	23.32	
67	7	2	Rafael Barreto	Philippines	23.42	
68	6	6	Danilo Rosafio	Kenya	23.51	
69	7	6	Ljupcho Angelovski	Macedonia	23.56	
70	3	7	Bakr Al-Dulaimi	Iraq	23.59	
71	6	3	Dan Siminel	Moldova	23.60	
72	6	4	Nixon Hernández	El Salvador	23.61	
73	5	5	Issa Al Adawi	Oman	23.62	
74	6	7	Delron Felix	Grenada	23.65	
75	6	8	Mohammad Rahman	Bangladesh	23.66	NR
76	6	2	Hilal Hemed Hilal	Tanzania	23.75	
77	6	9	Noah Mascoll-Gomes	Antigua and Barbuda	23.77	
78	7	7	Sidrell Williams	Jamaica	23.81	
79	1	5	Kirill Vais	Kyrgyzstan	23.83	
80	6	1	Epeli Rabua	Fiji	23.84	
81	6	5	Christian Nikles	Brunei	23.86	
82	2	0	Delgerkhuu Myagmar	Mongolia	24.02	
83	3	2	Musa Zhalayev	Turkmenistan	24.09	
84	7	9	Mohammad Madwa	Kuwait	24.24	
85	4	0	Kitso Matija	Botswana	24.27	
86	3	6	Kener Torrez	Nicaragua	24.35	
87	5	2	Gianluca Pasolini	San Marino	24.42	
88	6	0	Thomas Morriss	Samoa	24.46	
89	1	4	Belly-Cresus Ganira	Burundi	24.77	
90	5	6	Finau Ohuafi	Tonga	24.88	NR
91	2	3	Colins Ebingha	Nigeria	24.92	
92	1	2	Nabil Ahmed Saleh	Uganda	25.00	
92	5	4	Cruz Halbich	Saint Vincent and the Grenadines	25.00	
94	3	0	Mohammed Jibali	Libya	25.12	
94	5	7	Anas Altamari	Palestine	25.12	
96	2	1	James Hendrix	Guam	25.33	
97	1	3	Abobakr Abass	Sudan	25.40	
98	3	1	Antonio Andrew Rodrigues	Guyana	25.43	
98	3	8	Dren Ukimeraj	Kosovo	25.43	
100	1	1	Olimjon Ishanov	Tajikistan	25.47	
100	5	1	Kaleo Kihleng	Federated States of Micronesia	25.47	
102	5	8	Santisouk Inthavong	Laos	25.48	
103	4	9	Alassane Lancina	Niger	25.95	
104	4	1	Chanthol Thoeun	Cambodia	26.03	
105	2	9	Aamir Motiwala	Pakistan	26.09	
106	5	9	Jefferson Kpanou	Benin	26.70	
107	2	5	P.Y.D Poku-Dwumoh	Ghana	26.71	
108	5	0	Clayment Bill Lafiara	Solomon Islands	26.75	
109	2	8	Ian Salaka	Malawi	27.66	
110	2	2	Abdelmalik Muktar	Ethiopia	28.06	
111	4	2	Jack Parlee	Turks and Caicos Islands	28.17	
112	3	4	Amini Harindimana	Rwanda	28.25	
113	4	5	Mamadou Tahirou Bah	Guinea	28.55	
114	1	6	Joshua Wyse	Sierra Leone	28.86	
115	3	5	Ebrima Buaro	Gambia	29.54	
116	4	4	Daniel Ranis	Marshall Islands	29.63	
117	1	8	H.T.H. Baidar	Yemen	29.70	
118	4	7	Jessy Misak	Vanuatu	29.76	
119	3	9	Hamid Rahimi	Afghanistan	30.06	
120	4	6	David Hillah-Ayite	Togo	30.54	NR
121	4	3	Daoud Ali Haroun	Djibouti	30.89	
122	2	4	Omar Barry	Burkina Faso	31.21	
123	3	3	José da Silva Viegas	Timor-Leste	31.72	
124	4	8	Fenel Lamour	Haiti	32.42	
	7	0	Thibaut Danho	Ivory Coast	DNS	
	1	7	Hakim Youssouf	Comoros	DSQ	
	5	3	Josh Tarere	Papua New Guinea	DSQ	
	10	4	Heiko Gigler	Austria	DSQ	

==== Swim-off ====
The swim-off was held on 13 December at 11:45.

Rank	Lane	Name	Nationality	Time	Notes
1	5	Maksim Lobanovskij	Hungary	21.25	Q
2	4	Kristian Golomeev	Greece	21.28	

=== Semifinals ===
The semifinals were started on 13 December at 19:37.

==== Semifinal 1 ====
Rank	Lane	Name	Nationality	Time	Notes
1	5	Ben Proud	United Kingdom	20.71	Q
2	4	Vladimir Morozov	Russia	20.83	Q
3	1	Brad Tandy	South Africa	21.07	Q
4	3	Jesse Puts	Netherlands	21.12	QSO
4	6	Paweł Juraszek	Poland	21.12	QSO
6	8	Maxim Lobanovskij	Hungary	21.20	
7	2	Katsumi Nakamura	Japan	21.26	
8	7	Lorenzo Zazzeri	Italy	21.32	

==== Semifinal 2 ====
Rank	Lane	Name	Nationality	Time	Notes
1	4	Caeleb Dressel	United States	20.51	Q, =AM
2	5	Cameron McEvoy	Australia	20.97	Q
3	3	Simonas Bilis	Lithuania	21.03	Q, NR
4	8	César Cielo	Brazil	21.06	Q
5	6	Michael Andrew	United States	21.18	
6	7	Kosuke Matsui	Japan	21.30	
7	1	Ali Khalafalla	Egypt	21.39	
8	2	Sergii Shevtsov	Ukraine	21.43	

==== Swim-off ====
The swim-off was held on 14 December at 09:30.

Rank	Lane	Name	Nationality	Time	Notes
1	5	Paweł Juraszek	Poland	20.98	Q
2	4	Jesse Puts	Netherlands	21.08	

=== Final ===
The final was held on 14 December at 20:03.

Rank	Lane	Name	Nationality	Time	Notes
1st place, gold medalist(s)	3	Vladimir Morozov	Russia	20.33	
2nd place, silver medalist(s)	4	Caeleb Dressel	United States	20.54	
3rd place, bronze medalist(s)	1	Brad Tandy	South Africa	20.94	
4	2	Simonas Bilis	Lithuania	20.99	NR
5	8	Paweł Juraszek	Poland	21.00	
6	6	Cameron McEvoy	Australia	21.02	
7	7	César Cielo	Brazil	21.20	
	5	Ben Proud	United Kingdom	DSQ	
