= Tonga at the 2013 World Aquatics Championships =

- Flag of Tonga
- FINA code: TGA
- National federation: Tonga Swimming Association

in Barcelona, Spain
- Competitors: 3 in 1 sports
- Medals: Gold 0 Silver 0 Bronze 0 Total 0

World Aquatics Championships appearances
- 1973; 1975; 1978; 1982; 1986; 1991; 1994; 1998; 2001; 2003; 2005; 2007; 2009; 2011; 2013; 2015; 2017; 2019; 2022; 2023; 2024

Tonga competed at the 2013 World Aquatics Championships in Barcelona, Spain between 19 July and 4 August 2013.

== Swimming ==
Tongan swimmers achieved qualifying standards in the following events (up to a maximum of 2 swimmers in each event at the A-standard entry time, and 1 at the B-standard):

Men

Athlete	Event	Heat		Semifinal		Final	
Athlete	Event	Time	Rank	Time	Rank	Time	Rank
Ifalemi Sau-Paea	50 m butterfly	25.17	48	did not advance			
Ifalemi Sau-Paea	100 m butterfly	56.32	43	did not advance			

Women

Athlete	Event	Heat		Semifinal		Final	
Athlete	Event	Time	Rank	Time	Rank	Time	Rank
Charissa Panuve	100 m freestyle	1:07.10	66	did not advance			
Charissa Panuve	100 m butterfly	1:21.78	53	did not advance			
Irene Prescott	50 m freestyle	28.19	54	did not advance			
Irene Prescott	50 m butterfly	30.87	52	did not advance			
