= Kenya at the 2017 World Aquatics Championships =

- Flag of Kenya
- FINA code: KEN
- National federation: Kenya Swimming Federation
- Website: www.swimkenya.org

in Budapest, Hungary
- Competitors: 4 in 1 sport
- Medals: Gold 0 Silver 0 Bronze 0 Total 0

World Aquatics Championships appearances
- 1973; 1975; 1978; 1982; 1986; 1991; 1994; 1998; 2001; 2003; 2005; 2007; 2009; 2011; 2013; 2015; 2017; 2019; 2022–2023; 2024

Kenya competed at the 2017 World Aquatics Championships in Budapest, Hungary from 14 July to 30 July.

== Swimming ==
Kenya has received a Universality invitation from FINA to send a maximum of four swimmers (two men and two women) to the World Championships.

Athlete	Event	Heat		Semifinal		Final	
Athlete	Event	Time	Rank	Time	Rank	Time	Rank
Steven Maina	Men's 100 m freestyle	53.72	80	did not advance			
Steven Maina	Men's 100 m backstroke	1:00.55	43	did not advance			
Issa Mohamed	Men's 50 m freestyle	23.68	69	did not advance			
Issa Mohamed	Men's 50 m butterfly	25.12	48	did not advance			
Rebecca Kamau	Women's 100 m breaststroke	1:11.61	35	did not advance			
Rebecca Kamau	Women's 200 m breaststroke	2:36.99	27	did not advance			
Emily Muteti	Women's 50 m butterfly	27.78 NR	37	did not advance			
Emily Muteti	Women's 100 m butterfly	1:01.35	33	did not advance			
Steven Maina; Issa Mohamed; Rebecca Kamau; Emily Muteti	Mixed 4×100 m medley relay	4:08.84	18	—		did not advance	
