= Tonga at the 2024 World Aquatics Championships =

- Flag of Tonga
- FINA code: TGA
- National federation: Tonga Swimming Association

in Doha, Qatar
- Competitors: 4 in 1 sport
- Medals: Gold 0 Silver 0 Bronze 0 Total 0

World Aquatics Championships appearances
- 1973; 1975; 1978; 1982; 1986; 1991; 1994; 1998; 2001; 2003; 2005; 2007; 2009; 2011; 2013; 2015; 2017; 2019; 2022; 2023; 2024

Tonga competed at the 2024 World Aquatics Championships in Doha, Qatar from 2 to 18 February.

== Swimming ==
Tonga entered 4 swimmers.

Men

Athlete	Event	Heat		Semifinal		Final	
Athlete	Event	Time	Rank	Time	Rank	Time	Rank
Finau Ohuafi	100 metre freestyle	54.09	80	Did not advance			
Finau Ohuafi	100 metre butterfly	58.62	56	Did not advance			
Alan Uhi	50 metre freestyle	24.85	78	Did not advance			
Alan Uhi	100 metre backstroke	1:01.47	51	Did not advance			

Women

Athlete	Event	Heat		Semifinal		Final	
Athlete	Event	Time	Rank	Time	Rank	Time	Rank
Carolann Faeamani	50 metre freestyle	28.71	73	Did not advance			
Carolann Faeamani	50 metre backstroke	32.13	46	Did not advance			
Charissa Panuve	100 metre freestyle	1:03.60	66	Did not advance			
Charissa Panuve	200 metre freestyle	2:23.33	49	Did not advance			

Mixed

Athlete	Event	Heat		Final	
Athlete	Event	Time	Rank	Time	Rank
Carolann Faeamani; Alan Uhi; Charissa Panuve; Finau Ohuafi	4 × 100 m freestyle relay	3:57.90	17	Did not advance	
