= Kenya at the 2019 World Aquatics Championships =

- Flag of Kenya
- FINA code: KEN
- National federation: Kenya Swimming Federation

in Gwangju, South Korea
- Competitors: 4 in 1 sport
- Medals: Gold 0 Silver 0 Bronze 0 Total 0

World Aquatics Championships appearances
- 1973; 1975; 1978; 1982; 1986; 1991; 1994; 1998; 2001; 2003; 2005; 2007; 2009; 2011; 2013; 2015; 2017; 2019; 2022–2023; 2024

Kenya competed at the 2019 World Aquatics Championships in Gwangju, South Korea from 12 to 28 July.

== Swimming ==
Kenya has entered four swimmers.

Men

Athlete	Event	Heat		Semifinal		Final	
Athlete	Event	Time	Rank	Time	Rank	Time	Rank
Issa Mohamed	50 m butterfly	25.44	62	did not advance			
Danilo Rosafio	50 m freestyle	23.86	69	did not advance			
Danilo Rosafio	100 m freestyle	52.66	83	did not advance			

Women

Athlete	Event	Heat		Semifinal		Final	
Athlete	Event	Time	Rank	Time	Rank	Time	Rank
Maria Brunlehner	100 m freestyle	59.08	51	did not advance			
Maria Brunlehner	100 m breaststroke	1:15.09	43	did not advance			
Emily Muteti	50 m freestyle	=26.81	45	did not advance			
Emily Muteti	100 m butterfly	1:02.88	40	did not advance			

Mixed

Athlete	Event	Heat		Final	
Athlete	Event	Time	Rank	Time	Rank
Issa Abdulla Hemed Mohamed; Maria Brunlehner; Emily Muteti; Danilo Rosafio	4 × 100 m mixed freestyle relay	3:46.65	25	did not advance	
Issa Abdulla Hemed Mohamed; Maria Brunlehner; Emily Muteti; Danilo Rosafio	4 × 100 m mixed medley relay	4:16.83	26	did not advance	
