= Kenya at the 2015 World Aquatics Championships =

- Flag of Kenya
- FINA code: KEN
- National federation: Kenya Swimming Federation
- Website: www.swimkenya.org

in Kazan, Russia
- Competitors: 4 in 1 sport
- Medals: Gold 0 Silver 0 Bronze 0 Total 0

World Aquatics Championships appearances
- 1973; 1975; 1978; 1982; 1986; 1991; 1994; 1998; 2001; 2003; 2005; 2007; 2009; 2011; 2013; 2015; 2017; 2019; 2022–2023; 2024

Kenya competed at the 2015 World Aquatics Championships in Kazan, Russia from 24 July to 9 August 2015.

== Swimming ==
Kenyan swimmers have achieved qualifying standards in the following events (up to a maximum of 2 swimmers in each event at the A-standard entry time, and 1 at the B-standard):

Men

Athlete	Event	Heat		Semifinal		Final	
Athlete	Event	Time	Rank	Time	Rank	Time	Rank
Hamdan Bayusuf	50 m backstroke	27.74	54	did not advance			
Hamdan Bayusuf	100 m backstroke	1:00.07	57	did not advance			
Issa Mohamed	50 m freestyle	24.56	68	did not advance			
Issa Mohamed	100 m freestyle	54.02	85	did not advance			

Women

Athlete	Event	Heat		Semifinal		Final	
Athlete	Event	Time	Rank	Time	Rank	Time	Rank
Talisa Lanoe	100 m backstroke	1:07.05	56	did not advance			
Talisa Lanoe	200 m backstroke	2:24.45	42	did not advance			
Emily Muteti	100 m freestyle	1:00.51	70	did not advance			
Emily Muteti	100 m butterfly	1:04.91	55	did not advance			

Mixed

Athlete	Event	Heat		Final	
Athlete	Event	Time	Rank	Time	Rank
Emily Muteti; Hamdan Bayusuf; Talisa Lanoe; Issa Mohamed	4×100 m freestyle relay	3:52.86	24	did not advance	
Talisa Lanoe; Issa Mohamed; Emily Muteti; Hamdan Bayusuf	4×100 m medley relay	4:23.99	25	did not advance	
