= Tonga at the 2019 World Aquatics Championships =

- Flag of Tonga
- FINA code: TGA
- National federation: Tonga Swimming Association

in Gwangju, South Korea
- Competitors: 4 in 1 sport
- Medals: Gold 0 Silver 0 Bronze 0 Total 0

World Aquatics Championships appearances
- 1973; 1975; 1978; 1982; 1986; 1991; 1994; 1998; 2001; 2003; 2005; 2007; 2009; 2011; 2013; 2015; 2017; 2019; 2022; 2023; 2024

Tonga competed at the 2019 World Aquatics Championships in Gwangju, South Korea from 12 to 28 July.

== Swimming ==
Tonga entered four swimmers.

Men

Athlete	Event	Heat		Semifinal		Final	
Athlete	Event	Time	Rank	Time	Rank	Time	Rank
Amini Fonua	50 m breaststroke	29.73	56	did not advance			
Amini Fonua	100 m breaststroke	1:08.32	81	did not advance			
Finau Ohuafi	50 m freestyle	25.32	98	did not advance			
Finau Ohuafi	100 m freestyle	57.45	106	did not advance			

Women

Athlete	Event	Heat		Semifinal		Final	
Athlete	Event	Time	Rank	Time	Rank	Time	Rank
Noelani Day	50 m freestyle	28.67	67	did not advance			
Noelani Day	50 m backstroke	35.17	43	did not advance			
Charissa Panuve	100 m freestyle	1:08.00	84	did not advance			
Charissa Panuve	200 m freestyle	2:33.31	61	did not advance			

Mixed

Athlete	Event	Heat		Final	
Athlete	Event	Time	Rank	Time	Rank
Finau Ohuafi; Noelani Day; Charissa Panuve; Amini Fonua	4×100 m freestyle relay	4:08.19	34	did not advance	
Finau Ohuafi; Amini Fonua; Charissa Panuve; Noelani Day	4×100 m medley relay	4:39.91	34	did not advance	
