= Nigeria at the 2019 World Aquatics Championships =

- Flag of Nigeria
- World Aquatics code: NGR
- National federation: Nigeria Aquatics Federation

in Gwangju, South Korea
- Competitors: 4 in 1 sport
- Medals: Gold 0 Silver 0 Bronze 0 Total 0

World Aquatics Championships appearances
- 1973; 1975; 1978; 1982; 1986; 1991; 1994; 1998; 2001; 2003; 2005; 2007; 2009; 2011; 2013; 2015; 2017; 2019; 2022; 2023; 2024; 2025

Nigeria competed at the 2019 World Aquatics Championships in Gwangju, South Korea from 12 to 28 July.

== Swimming ==
Nigeria has entered four swimmers.

Men

| Athlete | Event | Heat | | Semifinal | | Final | |
| Athlete | Event | Time | Rank | Time | Rank | Time | Rank |
|---|---|---|---|---|---|---|---|
| Ifeakachuku Nmor | 50 m butterfly | 25.34 | 60 | Did not advance | | | |
| Ifeakachuku Nmor | 100 m butterfly | 57.65 | 63 | Did not advance | | | |
| Yellow Yeiyah | 50 m freestyle | 24.81 | 90 | Did not advance | | | |
| Yellow Yeiyah | 100 m freestyle | 55.23 | 97 | Did not advance | | | |

Women

| Athlete | Event | Heat | | Semifinal | | Final | |
| Athlete | Event | Time | Rank | Time | Rank | Time | Rank |
|---|---|---|---|---|---|---|---|
| Chinelo Iyadi | 50 m breaststroke | 35.64 | 44 | Did not advance | | | |
| Chinelo Iyadi | 100 m breaststroke | 1:20.48 | 50 | Did not advance | | | |
| Abiola Ogunbanwo | 100 m freestyle | 1:01.31 | 71 | Did not advance | | | |
| Abiola Ogunbanwo | 200 m freestyle | 2:15.44 | 51 | Did not advance | | | |

Mixed

| Athlete | Event | Heat | | Final | |
| Athlete | Event | Time | Rank | Time | Rank |
|---|---|---|---|---|---|
| Ifeakachuku Nmor; Chinelo Iyadi; Abiola Ogunbanwo; Yellow Yeiyah | 4 × 100 m mixed freestyle relay | DNS | | Did not advance | |
| Ifeakachuku Nmor; Chinelo Iyadi; Abiola Ogunbanwo; Yellow Yeiyah | 4 × 100 m mixed medley relay | 4:35.59 | 33 | Did not advance | |
