= Kenya at the 2024 World Aquatics Championships =

- Flag of Kenya
- FINA code: KEN
- National federation: Kenya Swimming Federation

in Doha, Qatar
- Competitors: 5 in 2 sports
- Medals: Gold 0 Silver 0 Bronze 0 Total 0

World Aquatics Championships appearances
- 1973; 1975; 1978; 1982; 1986; 1991; 1994; 1998; 2001; 2003; 2005; 2007; 2009; 2011; 2013; 2015; 2017; 2019; 2022–2023; 2024

Kenya competed at the 2024 World Aquatics Championships in Doha, Qatar from 2 to 18 February.

== Competitors ==
The following is the list of competitors in the Championships.

Sport	Men	Women	Total
Open water swimming	1	0	1
Swimming	2	2	4
Total	3	2	5

== Open water swimming ==
Men

Athlete	Event	Time	Rank
Igbaal Bayusuf	Men's 5 km	OTL	

== Swimming ==
Kenya entered 4 swimmers.

Men

Athlete	Event	Heat		Semifinal		Final	
Athlete	Event	Time	Rank	Time	Rank	Time	Rank
Monyo Maina	200 metre freestyle	1:56.15	54	Did not advance			
Ridhwan Mohamed	100 metre freestyle	52.71	73	Did not advance			
Ridhwan Mohamed	400 metre freestyle	4:06.44 NR	45	—		Did not advance	

Women

Athlete	Event	Heat		Semifinal		Final	
Athlete	Event	Time	Rank	Time	Rank	Time	Rank
Maria Brunlehner	50 metre freestyle	26.12	40	Did not advance			
Maria Brunlehner	100 metre freestyle	57.84	34	Did not advance			
Imara Thorpe	50 metre butterfly	28.34	37	Did not advance			
Imara Thorpe	100 metre butterfly	1:04.81	35	Did not advance			

Mixed

Athlete	Event	Heat		Semifinal		Final	
Athlete	Event	Time	Rank	Time	Rank	Time	Rank
Maria Brunlehner; Monyo Maina; Ridhwan Mohamed; Imara Thorpe	4 × 100 m freestyle relay	3:42.28 NR	12	—		Did not advance	
Maria Brunlehner; Monyo Maina; Ridhwan Mohamed; Imara Thorpe	4 × 100 m medley relay	4:13.81	27	—		Did not advance	
