= Suspended Member Federation at the World Aquatics Championships =

- Flag of World Aquatics
- World Aquatics code: SMF
- National federation: Varies by edition (see below)
- Website: www.worldaquatics.com
- Medals: Gold 0 Silver 0 Bronze 1 Total 1

World Aquatics Championships appearances (overview)
- 2017; 2019; 2022; 2023; 2024–2025

During the FINA World Aquatics Championships, athletes whose governing body has been suspended are still allowed to compete under the FINA flag with the "country" designation as "Suspended Member Federation". In 2015, the Sri Lankan federation was suspended, but they competed as independent athletes under the FINA code. Since 2017, Kuwait, Kenya, and the Philippines have sent participants to the Aquatics Championships under the SMF code.

== Suspended federations covered ==
By edition

Year	Suspended members/s	Athletes
(Russia) 2015 Kazan	Sri Lanka	4
(Hungary) 2017 Budapest	Kuwait	2
(South Korea) 2019 Gwangju	None	
(Hungary) 2022 Budapest	Kenya	2
(Japan) 2023 Fukuoka	Kenya	4
(Japan) 2023 Fukuoka	Philippines	6
(Qatar) 2024 Doha	Belarus	5
Total	5 federations	

Represented member federations when suspended

- (Sri Lanka) Sri Lankan Aquatic Sports Union (2015–2016)
- Kuwait Swimming Association (2015–2019)
- Kenya Swimming Federation (2019–suspension active)
- (Philippines) Philippine Swimming (2022–2023)

National federations which had swimmers represented at the World Aquatics Championship while suspended only.

== 2017 World Aquatics Championships ==
Due to the suspension of the Kuwait Swimming Association, Kuwaiti athletes participated as independent athletes at the 2017 World Aquatics Championships. The competition took place in Budapest, Hungary from 14 July to 30 July. Two male swimmers participated in three different events.

Athlete	Event	Heat		Semifinal		Final	
Athlete	Event	Time	Rank	Time	Rank	Time	Rank
Khaled Al-Houti	Men's 50 m freestyle	25.24	97	Did not advance			
Rashed Al-Tarmoom	Men's 100 m freestyle	DNS		Did not advance			
Rashed Al-Tarmoom	Men's 200 m freestyle	DNS		Did not advance			

== 2022 World Aquatics Championships ==
Two athletes from Kenya competed at the 2022 World Aquatics Championships in Budapest, Hungary from 18 June to 3 July. Each swimmer participated in two events.

Men

Athlete	Event	Heat		Semifinal		Final	
Athlete	Event	Time	Rank	Time	Rank	Time	Rank
Swaleh Talib	50 m freestyle	24.23	62	Did not advance			
Swaleh Talib	100 m freestyle	54.02	78	Did not advance			

Women

Athlete	Event	Heat		Semifinal		Final	
Athlete	Event	Time	Rank	Time	Rank	Time	Rank
Lucia Ruchti	50 m freestyle	27.92	52	Did not advance			
Lucia Ruchti	50 m backstroke	32.33	32	Did not advance			

== 2023 World Aquatics Championships ==
Six athletes from the Philippines and four from Kenya competed at the 2023 World Aquatics Championships in Fukuoka, Japan from 14 to 30 July.

Men

Athlete	Nation from	Event	Heat		Semifinal		Final	
Athlete	Nation from	Event	Time	Rank	Time	Rank	Time	Rank
Jarod Hatch	Philippines	50 metre butterfly	24.07	46	Did not advance			
Jarod Hatch	Philippines	100 metre butterfly	52.87 NR	32	Did not advance			
Jerard Jacinto	Philippines	50 metre backstroke	26.41	41	Did not advance			
Jerard Jacinto	Philippines	100 metre backstroke	58.40	51	Did not advance			
Monyo Maina	Kenya	100 metre freestyle	53.03	82	Did not advance			
Monyo Maina	Kenya	200 metre freestyle	1:55.28	53	Did not advance			
Swaleh Abubakar Talib	Kenya	50 metre freestyle	24.23	74	Did not advance			
Swaleh Abubakar Talib	Kenya	50 metre backstroke	30.03	59	Did not advance			

Women

Athlete	Event	Heat		Semifinal		Final	
Athlete	Event	Time	Rank	Time	Rank	Time	Rank
Jasmine Alkhaldi	Philippines	50 metre freestyle	26.30	47	Did not advance		
Jasmine Alkhaldi	Philippines	100 metre butterfly	1:01.94	34	Did not advance		
Maria Brunlehner	Kenya	50 metre freestyle	26.49	49	Did not advance		
Maria Brunlehner	Kenya	100 metre freestyle	59.00	39	Did not advance		
Xiandi Chua	Philippines	200 metre backstroke	2:13.80	23	Did not advance		
Xiandi Chua	Philippines	400 metre individual medley	4:49.13	25	—		Did not advance
Thanya Dela Cruz	Philippines	50 metre breaststroke	32.25	36	Did not advance		
Thanya Dela Cruz	Philippines	100 metre breaststroke	1:11.79	45	Did not advance		
Emily Muteti	Kenya	50 metre butterfly	28.46	40	Did not advance		
Emily Muteti	Kenya	100 metre butterfly	1:03.17	42	Did not advance		

Mixed

Athlete	Event	Heat		Final	
Athlete	Event	Time	Rank	Time	Rank
Monyo Maina; Swaleh Abubakar Talib; Emily Muteti; Maria Brunlehner	Kenya	4 × 100 m freestyle relay	3:42.58	26	Did not advance
Swaleh Abubakar Talib; Maria Brunlehner; Emily Muteti; Monyo Maina	Kenya	4 × 100 m medley relay	4:15.36	30	Did not advance

== See also ==
- FINA athletes at the World Aquatics Championships
