= Tonga at the 2017 World Aquatics Championships =

- Flag of Tonga
- FINA code: TGA
- National federation: Tonga Swimming Association

in Budapest, Hungary
- Competitors: 3 in 1 sport
- Medals: Gold 0 Silver 0 Bronze 0 Total 0

World Aquatics Championships appearances
- 1973; 1975; 1978; 1982; 1986; 1991; 1994; 1998; 2001; 2003; 2005; 2007; 2009; 2011; 2013; 2015; 2017; 2019; 2022; 2023; 2024

Tonga competed at the 2017 World Aquatics Championships in Budapest, Hungary from 14 July to 30 July.

== Swimming ==
Tonga has received a Universality invitation from FINA to send three swimmers (two men and one woman) to the World Championships.

Athlete	Event	Heat		Semifinal		Final	
Athlete	Event	Time	Rank	Time	Rank	Time	Rank
Andrew Lapuka	Men's 50 m freestyle	26.72	108	did not advance			
Andrew Lapuka	Men's 50 m butterfly	30.59	80	did not advance			
Tongli Panuve	Men's 100 m freestyle	58.21	101	did not advance			
Tongli Panuve	Men's 200 m freestyle	2:12.61	73	did not advance			
Charissa Panuve	Women's 100 m freestyle	1:05.47	72	did not advance			
Charissa Panuve	Women's 50 m butterfly	33.43	55	did not advance			
