= List of Kenyan records in swimming =

The Kenya Records in swimming are the fastest times ever swum by an individual representing Kenya. These national records are maintained by the Kenya Swimming Federation (KSF).

KSF keeps records for both for men and women, for long course (50m) and short course (25m) events. Records are kept in the following events (by stroke):

- freestyle: 50, 100, 200, 400, 800 and 1500;
- backstroke: 50, 100 and 200;
- breaststroke: 50, 100 and 200;
- butterfly: 50, 100 and 200;
- individual medley: 100 (25m only), 200 and 400;
- relays: 4×50 free, 4×100 free, 4×200 free, 4×50 medley, and 4 × 100 medley.

== Long course (50m) ==
=== Men ===
Event	Time		Name	Club	Date	Meet	Location	Ref
50 m freestyle	21.89	sf	David Dunford	Kenya	31 July 2009	World Championships	Rome, Italy	
100 m freestyle	48.73		Jason Dunford	Kenya	9 July 2009	World University Games	Belgrade, Serbia	
200 m freestyle	1:50.30		Jason Dunford	Kenya	13 July 2007	African Games	Algiers, Algeria	
400 m freestyle	4:04.39		Ridhwan Mohamed	University of Bath SC	8 June 2024	38. Medjunarodno Plivacko Natjecanje "Zlatni Medvjed"	Zagreb, Croatia	
800 m freestyle	8:39.64		Ivan Hart	Millfield	17 June 2022	Team Bath AS and Millfield L1	Street, Great Britain	
1500 m freestyle	16:38.29		Ivan Hart	Millfield	22 July 2023	British Summer Championships 2	Sheffield, Great Britain	
50 m backstroke	26.19		Jason Dunford	Kenya	6 September 2011	African Games	Maputo, Mozambique	
100 m backstroke	57.57		Jason Dunford	Kenya	18 July 2007	African Games	Algiers, Algeria	
200 m backstroke	2:06.48		David Dunford	Kenya	13 September 2006	African Championships	Dakar, Senegal	
50m breaststroke	28.62		Haniel Kudwoli	Kenya	8 May 2026	African Championships	Oran, Algeria	
100m breaststroke	1:03.85	h	Haniel Kudwoli	Kenya	6 May 2026	African Championships	Oran, Algeria	
200m breaststroke	2:22.42		Micah Jai Fernandes	Northern Tigers Swimming	12 April 2014	South African Championships	Durban, South Africa	
50m butterfly	23.04		Jason Dunford	Kenya	27 July 2009	World Championships	Rome, Italy	
100m butterfly	50.78	sf	Jason Dunford	Kenya	37 July 2009	World Championships	Rome, Italy	
200m butterfly	2:02.52		Jason Dunford	Kenya	7 September 2011	African Games	Maputo, Mozambique	
200m individual medley	2:14.55 (Note: by official result source; 2:14.45 by swimrankings.net, a typo)		Kimani Maina	Kenya	11 September 2015	African Games	Brazzaville, Congo	
400m individual medley	4:53.34		Kamal Shah	Kenya	13 September 1998	Commonwealth Games	Bukit Jalil, Malaysia	
4×50m freestyle relay	1:37.07		Danilo Rosafio; Ridhwan Abubakar; Nobby Nelson; Swaleh Talib	Bandari Swim Club	12 April 2019	KSF National Trials	Kasarani, Kenya	
4×100m freestyle relay	3:29.84		Jason Dunford (50.84); David Dunford (48.63); Rama Vyombo (53.95); Kiptolo Boit (56.42)	Kenya	8 September 2011	African Games	Maputo, Mozambique	
4×200m freestyle relay	8:01.07		David Dunford (1:52.18); Amar Shah (2:07.68); Kiptolo Boit (2:08.37); Jason Dunford (1:52.86)	Kenya	7 September 2011	All-Africa Games	Maputo, Mozambique	
4×50m medley relay	1:52.85		Igbaal Bayusuf; Neo Olengo; Johari Masinde; Swaleh Talib	Kenya	16 October 2025	Africa Aquatics Zone III Championships	Nairobi, Kenya	
4×100m medley relay	3:53.55		David Dunford (58.11); Amar Shah (1:08.86); Jason Dunford (52.26); Rama Vyombo (54.32)	Kenya	10 September 2011	African Games	Maputo, Mozambique	

Legend: # – Record awaiting ratification by Kenya Swimming Federation; AF – African record; CR – Commonwealth record; e – equalled existing record;
Records not set in finals: h – heat; sf – semifinal; r – relay 1st leg; rh – relay heat 1st leg; b – B final; † – en route to final mark; so – swim-off; tt – time trial

=== Women ===
Event	Time		Name	Club	Date	Meet	Location	Ref
50m freestyle	25.82	h	Maria Brunlehner	Kenya	3 August 2024	Olympic Games	Paris, France	
100m freestyle	57.09		Maria Brunlehner	SG Stadtwerke München	17 June 2017	German Championships	Berlin, Germany	
200m freestyle	2:04.81		Rebecca Kamau	City of Birmingham	28 August 2015	British Championships	Sheffield, United Kingdom	
400m freestyle	4:28.56	h	Rebecca Kamau	City of Birmingham	30 January 2016	Burns Open Meet	Sheffield, Great Britain	
800m freestyle	9:17.64		Maria Brunlehner	SG Stadtwerke München	23 January 2016	Brandenburgischer Adler Pokal	Brandenburg an der Havel, Germany	
1500m freestyle	19:00.00		Angel Samoei	Tuks Aquatics Club	21 March 2023	SA National Junior Age Group C	Pretoria, South Africa	
50m backstroke	30.05		Sylvia Brunlehner	SG Stadtwerke München	21 April 2017	Graz Trophy	Graz, Austria	
100m backstroke	1:04.84	h	Sylvia Brunlehner	SG Stadtwerke München	16 June 2017	German Championships	Berlin, Germany	
200m backstroke	2:24.45	h	Talisa Lanoe	Kenya	7 August 2015	World Championships	Kazan, Russia	
50m breaststroke	30.73		Achieng Ajulu-Bushell	Kenya	8 December 2009	Gymnasiade	Doha, Qatar	
100m breaststroke	1:08.51		Achieng Ajulu-Bushell	Plymouth Lea	2 April 2010	British Championships	Sheffield, Great Britain	
200m breaststroke	2:29.65		Rebecca Kamau	City of Birmingham	27 July 2016	British Championships	Sheffield, Great Britain	
50m butterfly	27.72		Emily Muteti	-	15 June 2017	Neo Garden 13th SNSC	Singapore, Singapore	
100m butterfly	1:01.06		Emily Muteti	-	17 June 2017	Neo Garden 13th SNSC	Singapore, Singapore	
200m butterfly	2:21.74		Emily Muteti	-	18 June 2017	Neo Garden 13th SNSC	Singapore, Singapore	
200m individual medley	2:18.60		Rebecca Kamau	City of Birmingham	16 April 2015	British Championships	London, United Kingdom	
400m individual medley	5:01.55		Rebecca Kamau	City of Birmingham	23 May 2015	City of Sheffield Swim Club No Frills Meet	Sheffield, United Kingdom	
4×50m freestyle relay	1:54.37		Macrine Kalombo; Victoria Okumu; Audrey Chebet Langat; Duini Caffini	Kenya	19 October 2025	Africa Aquatics Zone III Championships	Nairobi, Kenya	
4×100m freestyle relay	3.58.75		Emily Muteti (1:00.39); Imara-Bella Thorpe (1:00.19); Sylvia Brunlehner (59.08); Maria Brunlehner (59.09)	Kenya	21 August 2019	African Games	Casablanca, Morocco	
4×200m freestyle relay	9:39.61		Maria Bianchi; Moige Kotut; Ruth Wangari Lindkvist; Angel Samoei	Kenya	8 December 2023	African Junior Championships	Saint Pierre, Mauritius	
4×50m medley relay	2:10.14		Audrey Chebet Langat; Duini Caffini; Victoria Okumu; Macrine Kalombo	Kenya	16 October 2025	Africa Aquatics Zone III Championships	Nairobi, Kenya	
4×100m medley relay	4:34.66	h	Rachita Shah (1:10.24); Achieng Ajulu-Bushell (1:11.94); Pina Ercolano (1:10.79); Sylvia Brunlehner (1:01.69)	Kenya	1 August 2009	World Championships	Rome, Italy	
4×100m medley relay	4:21.72	disqualified	Sylvia Brunlehner (1:06.94); Rebecca Kamau (1:13.87); Emily Muteti (1:02.80); Maria Brunlehner (58.11)	Kenya	24 August 2019	African Games	Casablanca, Morocco	

Legend: # – Record awaiting ratification by Kenya Swimming Federation; WR – World record; AF – African record; e – equalled existing record;
Records not set in finals: h – heat; sf – semifinal; r – relay 1st leg; rh – relay heat 1st leg; b – B final; † – en route to final mark; so – swim-off; tt – time trial

=== Mixed relay ===
Event	Time		Name	Club	Date	Meet	Location	Ref
4×50 m freestyle relay	1:46.40		Swaleh Talib; Johari Masinde; Duini Caffini; Macrine Kalombo	Kenya	17 October 2025	Africa Aquatics Zone III Championships	Nairobi, Kenya	
4×100 m freestyle relay	3:42.28	h	Monyo Maina (52.94); Ridhwan Mohamed (52.67); Imara Thorpe (59.28); Maria Brunlehner (57.39)	Kenya	17 February 2024	World Championships	Doha, Qatar	
4×200 m freestyle relay	10:57.12		Elliana Maina; Harith Muses; Nalwoga Mutinda; Abdulkadir Abdulkadir	Mombasa Aquatics	16 February 2025	Kenyan Championships	Nairobi, Kenya	
4×50 m medley relay	1:59.10		Audrey Chebet Langat; Neo Olengo; Victor Oketch; Duini Caffini	Kenya	17 October 2025	Africa Aquatics Zone III Championships	Nairobi, Kenya	
4×100 m medley relay	4:05.16	h	Stephen Nyoike (1:01.11); Haniel Kudwoli (1:04.70); Imara Thorpe (1:02.24); Sara Mose (57.11)	Kenya	28 July 2026	Commonwealth Games	Glasgow, United Kingdom	

Legend: # – Record awaiting ratification by Kenya Swimming Federation; WR – World record; AF – African record; e – equalled existing record;
Records not set in finals: h – heat; so – swim-off

== Short Course (25m) ==
=== Men ===
Event	Time		Name	Club	Date	Meet	Location	Ref
50m freestyle	21.78		Jason Dunford	Kenya	8 October 2011	World Cup	Dubai, United Arab Emirates	
100m freestyle	47.23	sf	David Dunford	Kenya	18 December 2010	World Championships	Dubai, United Arab Emirates	
200m freestyle	1:51.08		Ridhwan Mohamed	Bath University	17 November 2023	BUCS Championships	Sheffield, United Kingdom	
400m freestyle	3:58.78		Ridhwan Mohamed	Bath University	19 November 2023	BUCS Championships	Sheffield, United Kingdom	
800m freestyle	8:22.39		Ridhwan Mohamed	Bath University	18 November 2023	BUCS Championships	Sheffield, United Kingdom	
1500m freestyle	15:50.43		Ivan Hart	Millfield	2 December 2022	Swim England National Winter Championships	Sheffield, United Kingdom	
50m backstroke	25.36		Stephen Ndegwa	Bandari Swim Club	6 December 2025	Kenyan Championships	Mombasa, Kenya	
100m backstroke	57.21	h	David Dunford	Kenya	5 April 2006	World Championships	Shanghai, China	
200m backstroke	2:04.98		Hamdan Iqbal Bayusuf	-	8 December 2013	ASA SWR Championships	Millfield, Great Britain	
50m breaststroke	28.27	h	Haniel Kudwoli	Kenya	14 December 2024	World Championships	Budapest, Hungary	
100m breaststroke	1:02.49	h	Haniel Kudwoli	Kenya	11 December 2024	World Championships	Budapest, Hungary	
200m breaststroke	2:18.97		Micah Fernandes	Tuks Aquatics Club	7 August 2014	South African Championships	Durban, South Africa	
50m butterfly	22.80	h	Jason Dunford	Kenya	17 December 2010	World Championships	Dubai, United Arab Emirates	
100m butterfly	50.38	h	Jason Dunford	Kenya	15 December 2010	World Championships	Dubai, United Arab Emirates	
200m butterfly	2:02.47	h	Jason Dunford	Kenya	9 April 2006	World Championships	Shanghai, China	
100m individual medley	55.55	h	Jason Dunford	Kenya	15 December 2012	World Championships	Istanbul, Turkey	
200m individual medley	2:10.70		Steven Kimani Maina	Olympian	17 December 2016	JP Fiset Invitational	Edmonton, Canada	
400m individual medley	4:44.89		Ivan Hart	Millfield	4 November 2022	South West Winter Championships	Street, Great Britain	
4×50m freestyle relay	1:36.99		Ridhwan Abubakar; Swaleh Talib; Samuel Ndonga; Danilo Rosafio	Kenya	20 October 2017	CANA Zone III Championships	Dar es Salaam, Tanzania	
4×100m freestyle relay	3:26.45	h	Jason Dunford (47.78); David Dunford (50.69); Rama Vyombo (53.46); Amar Shah (54.52)	Kenya	5 April 2006	World Championships	Shanghai, China	
4×200m freestyle relay	8:21.86		Omar Talib; Muhammad Khandwalla; Nobby Nelson; Mohamed Suleiman	Bandari SC	16 October 2016	Casa Age Group 10 years & over	Mombasa, Kenya	
4×50m medley relay	1:48.12			Stingray	26 August 2006	-	Nairobi, Kenya	
4×100m medley relay	3:51.55	h	David Dunford (57.64); Amar Shah (1:06.83); Jason Dunford (52.64); Rama Vyombo (54.44)	Kenya	9 April 2006	World Championships	Shanghai, China	

Legend: # – Record awaiting ratification by Kenya Swimming Federation; e – equalled existing record;
Records not set in finals: h – heat; sf – semifinal; r – relay 1st leg; rh – relay heat 1st leg; b – B final; † – en route to final mark; so – swim-off; tt – time trial

=== Women ===
Event	Time		Name	Club	Date	Meet	Location	Ref
50m freestyle	25.35		Sara Mose	AZS AWF Warszawa	18 December 2025	Polish Championships	Szczecin, Poland	
100m freestyle	55.40	r	Sara Mose	AZS AWF Warszawa	19 December 2025	Polish Championships	Szczecin, Poland	
200m freestyle	2:02.34		Rebecca Kamau	City of Birmingham	20 December 2015	ASA Winter Meet	Sheffield, Great Britain	
400m freestyle	4:23.56		Rebecca Kamau	NASA Wildcat Aquatics	-	Burns Open Meet	Sheffield, Great Britain	
800m freestyle	9:14.91		Emily Muteti	Mombasa AC	16 October 2016	CASA Age Group 10 years & over	Mombasa, Kenya	
1500m freestyle	17:56.82		Emily Muteti	Mombasa AC	30 October 2016	Kenya Age Group And Open Championships	Mombasa, Kenya	
50m backstroke	28.96	rh	Imara-Bella Thorpe	Kenya	11 December 2024	World Championships	Budapest, Hungary	
100m backstroke	1:03.64	h	Sylvia Brunlehner	SG Stadtwerke München	4 February 2017	Deutscher Mannschaftswettbewerb Schwimmen (DMS)	Essen, Germany	
200m backstroke	2:19.55	h	Talisa Lanoe	Kenya	5 December 2014	World Championships	Doha, Qatar	
50m breaststroke	30.11		Achieng Ajulu-Bushell	Kenya	6 August 2009	British Grand Prix	Leeds, United Kingdom	
100m breaststroke	1:06.14		Achieng Ajulu-Bushell	Kenya	8 August 2009	British Grand Prix	Leeds, United Kingdom	
200m breaststroke	2:26.72		Rebecca Kamau	NASA Wildcat Aquatics	27 July 2016	British Summer Championship	Sheffield, United Kingdom	
50m butterfly	27.54	h	Imara-Bella Thorpe	Kenya	10 December 2024	World Championships	Budapest, Hungary	
100m butterfly	1:01.99	h	Imara-Bella Thorpe	Kenya	13 December 2024	World Championships	Budapest, Hungary	
200m butterfly	2:19.67		Emily Muteti	Mombasa Aquatics	29 May 2016	CASA Interclubs Invitational 2	Mombasa, Kenya	
100m individual medley	1:01.83		Achieng Ajulu-Bushell	Plymouth Lea	13 February 2010	Devon County Champs	Tiverton, Great Britain	
200m individual medley	2:14.81		Rebecca Kamau	City of Birmingham	17 December 2015	ASA Winter Meet	Sheffield, Great Britain	
400m individual medley	4:44.18		Rebecca Kamau	City of Birmingham	20 December 2015	ASA Winter Meet	Sheffield, Great Britain	
4×50m freestyle relay	1:55.23		Victoria Okumu; Saniyah Omoro; Nina Irangi; Maria Bianchi	Kenya	24 November 2024	CANA Zone III Championships	Bujumbura, Burundi	
4×100m freestyle relay	4:19.09		Alesa Ilako; Riva Karia; Virginia Okumu; Nasiminyu Khatundi	Kenya	19 October 2017	CANA Zone III Championships	Dar es Salaam, Tanzania	
4×200m free relay	10:16.88		Juhania Islam Ali; Caroline Kameta; Emily Muteti; Nabiha Shikely	Mombasa Aquatics	29 May 2016	CASA Interclubs Invitational 2	Mombasa, Kenya	
4×50m medley relay	2:10.60			Hillcrest School	17 October 1976	?		
4×100m medley relay	4:48.80			Hillcrest School	12 March 1977	?	Nairobi, Kenya	

Legend: # – Record awaiting ratification by Kenya Swimming Federation; AF – African record; e – equalled existing record;
Records not set in finals: h – heat; sf – semifinal; r – relay 1st leg; rh – relay heat 1st leg; b – B final; † – en route to final mark; so – swim-off; tt – time trial

=== Mixed relay ===
Event	Time		Name	Club	Date	Meet	Location	Ref
4×50 m freestyle relay	1:37.53	h	Haniel Kudwoli (23.70); Sara Mose (25.16); Imara Bella Thorpe (25.53); Stephen Nyoike (23.14)	Kenya	13 December 2024	World Championships	Budapest, Hungary	
4×100 m freestyle relay	4:19.52		Mohammed Shiekh; Ameir Muravvej; Natasha Thuranira; Emma Wambui	Bandari SC	14 October 2022	CASA Mixed Levels SC & Relays	Mombasa, Kenya	
4×50 m medley relay	1:47.53	h	Imara Bella Thorpe (28.96); Haniel Kudwoli (28.77); Stephen Nyokie (27.77); Sara Mose (24.96)	Kenya	11 December 2024	World Championships	Budapest, Hungary	
4×100 m medley relay	3:59.54	h	Imara-Bella Thorpe (1:03.55); Haniel Kudwoli (1:02.34); Stephen Nyokie (57.41); Sara Mose (56.24)	Kenya	14 December 2024	World Championships	Budapest, Hungary	

Legend: # – Record awaiting ratification by Kenya Swimming Federation; e – equalled existing record;
Records not set in finals: h – heat; so – swim-off
