= Kenya at the 2013 World Aquatics Championships =

- Flag of Kenya
- FINA code: KEN
- National federation: Kenya Swimming Federation
- Website: www.swimkenya.org

in Barcelona, Spain
- Competitors: 3 in 1 sports
- Medals: Gold 0 Silver 0 Bronze 0 Total 0

World Aquatics Championships appearances
- 1973; 1975; 1978; 1982; 1986; 1991; 1994; 1998; 2001; 2003; 2005; 2007; 2009; 2011; 2013; 2015; 2017; 2019; 2022–2023; 2024

Kenya competed at the 2013 World Aquatics Championships in Barcelona, Spain between 19 July and 4 August 2013.

== Swimming ==
Kenyan swimmers earned qualifying standards in the following events (up to a maximum of 2 swimmers in each event at the A-standard entry time, and 1 at the B-standard):

Men

Athlete	Event	Heat		Semifinal		Final	
Athlete	Event	Time	Rank	Time	Rank	Time	Rank
Hamdan Bayusuf	50 m backstroke	28.20	37	did not advance			
Hamdan Bayusuf	100 m backstroke	1:01.05	46	did not advance			

Women

Athlete	Event	Heat		Semifinal		Final	
Athlete	Event	Time	Rank	Time	Rank	Time	Rank
Sylvia Brunlehner	50 m freestyle	26.73	44	did not advance			
Sylvia Brunlehner	100 m freestyle	59.18	56	did not advance			
Emily Mueti	50 m butterfly	30.55	50	did not advance			
Emily Mueti	100 m butterfly	1:07.37	48	did not advance			
