= Nigeria at the 2023 World Aquatics Championships =

- Flag of Nigeria
- World Aquatics code: NGR
- National federation: Nigeria Aquatics Federation

in Fukuoka, Japan
- Competitors: 4 in 1 sport
- Medals: Gold 0 Silver 0 Bronze 0 Total 0

World Aquatics Championships appearances
- 1973; 1975; 1978; 1982; 1986; 1991; 1994; 1998; 2001; 2003; 2005; 2007; 2009; 2011; 2013; 2015; 2017; 2019; 2022; 2023; 2024; 2025

Nigeria is set to compete at the 2023 World Aquatics Championships in Fukuoka, Japan from 14 to 30 July.

== Swimming ==
Nigeria entered 4 swimmers.

Men

| Athlete | Event | Heat | | Semifinal | | Final | |
| Athlete | Event | Time | Rank | Time | Rank | Time | Rank |
|---|---|---|---|---|---|---|---|
| Colins Obi Ebingha | 50 metre freestyle | 23.54 | 65 | Did not advance | | | |
| Colins Obi Ebingha | 100 metre freestyle | 51.90 | 69 | Did not advance | | | |
| Clinton Opute | 200 metre freestyle | 1:57.92 | 61 | Did not advance | | | |
| Clinton Opute | 100 metre butterfly | 57.19 | 61 | Did not advance | | | |

Women

| Athlete | Event | Heat | | Semifinal | | Final | |
| Athlete | Event | Time | Rank | Time | Rank | Time | Rank |
|---|---|---|---|---|---|---|---|
| Dorcas Abeng | 100 metre freestyle | 1:01.81 | 56 | Did not advance | | | |
| Dorcas Abeng | 50 metre breaststroke | Disqualified | | Did not advance | | | |
| Adaku Nwandu | 50 metre freestyle | 27.33 | 59 | Did not advance | | | |
| Adaku Nwandu | 50 metre butterfly | 29.38 | 45 | Did not advance | | | |

Mixed

| Athlete | Event | Heat | | Final | |
| Athlete | Event | Time | Rank | Time | Rank |
|---|---|---|---|---|---|
| Clinton Opute; Colins Obi Ebingha; Dorcas Abeng; Adaku Nwandu | 4 × 100 m freestyle relay | 3:48.83 | 31 | Did not advance | |
| Clinton Opute; Adaku Nwandu; Dorcas Abeng; Colins Obi Ebingha | 4 × 100 m medley relay | 4:28.90 | 34 | Did not advance | |
