= Kenya at the 2011 World Aquatics Championships =

- Flag of Kenya
- FINA code: KEN
- National federation: Kenya Swimming Federation
- Website: www.swimkenya.org

in Shanghai, China
- Competitors: 3 in 1 sports
- Medals: Gold 0 Silver 0 Bronze 0 Total 0

World Aquatics Championships appearances
- 1973; 1975; 1978; 1982; 1986; 1991; 1994; 1998; 2001; 2003; 2005; 2007; 2009; 2011; 2013; 2015; 2017; 2019; 2022–2023; 2024

Kenya competed at the 2011 World Aquatics Championships in Shanghai, China between July 16 and 31, 2011.

== Swimming ==
Kenya qualified 3 swimmers.

Men

Athlete	Event	Heats		Semifinals		Final	
Athlete	Event	Time	Rank	Time	Rank	Time	Rank
David Dunford	Men's 50m Freestyle	22.34	17	did not advance			
David Dunford	Men's 100m Freestyle	49.20	23	did not advance			
Jason Dunford	Men's 50m Butterfly	23.48	4 Q	23.34	4 Q	23.60	7
Jason Dunford	Men's 100m Butterfly	51.87	4 Q	51.92	7 Q	51.59	4

Women

Athlete	Event	Heats		Semifinals		Final	
Athlete	Event	Time	Rank	Time	Rank	Time	Rank
Sylvia Bruhnlehner	Women's 50m Freestyle	28.20	50	did not advance			
Sylvia Bruhnlehner	Women's 50m Backstroke	32.09	46	did not advance			
Sylvia Bruhnlehner	Women's 50m Butterfly	30.81	40	did not advance			
