= Nigeria at the 2017 World Aquatics Championships =

- Flag of Nigeria
- FINA code: NGR
- National federation: Nigeria Swimming Federation

in Budapest, Hungary
- Competitors: 3 in 1 sport
- Medals: Gold 0 Silver 0 Bronze 0 Total 0

World Aquatics Championships appearances
- 1973; 1975; 1978; 1982; 1986; 1991; 1994; 1998; 2001; 2003; 2005; 2007; 2009; 2011; 2013; 2015; 2017; 2019; 2022; 2023; 2024

Nigeria competed at the 2017 World Aquatics Championships in Budapest, Hungary from 14 July to 30 July.

== Swimming ==
Nigeria has received a Universality invitation from FINA to send three swimmers (two men and one woman) to the World Championships.

Athlete	Event	Heat		Semifinal		Final	
Athlete	Event	Time	Rank	Time	Rank	Time	Rank
Ifeakachuku Nmor	Men's 50 m freestyle	24.31	88	did not advance			
Ifeakachuku Nmor	Men's 100 m butterfly	57.90	63	did not advance			
Yellow Yeiyah	Men's 100 m freestyle	56.38	93	did not advance			
Yellow Yeiyah	Men's 50 m butterfly	26.11	59	did not advance			
Faith Edorodion	Women's 50 m butterfly	32.61	52	did not advance			
Faith Edorodion	Women's 100 m butterfly	1:13.89	45	did not advance			
