= Nigeria at the 2013 World Aquatics Championships =

- Flag of Nigeria
- FINA code: NGR
- National federation: Nigeria Swimming Federation

in Barcelona, Spain
- Competitors: 3 in 1 sports
- Medals: Gold 0 Silver 0 Bronze 0 Total 0

World Aquatics Championships appearances
- 1973; 1975; 1978; 1982; 1986; 1991; 1994; 1998; 2001; 2003; 2005; 2007; 2009; 2011; 2013; 2015; 2017; 2019; 2022; 2023; 2024

Nigeria competed at the 2013 World Aquatics Championships in Barcelona, Spain between 19 July and 4 August 2013.

== Swimming ==
Nigerian swimmers earned qualifying standards in the following events (up to a maximum of 2 swimmers in each event at the A-standard entry time, and 1 at the B-standard):

Men

Athlete	Event	Heat		Semifinal		Final	
Athlete	Event	Time	Rank	Time	Rank	Time	Rank
Samson Opuakpo	50 m backstroke	DSQ		did not advance			
Samson Opuakpo	100 m freestyle	DSQ		did not advance			
Yellow Yeiyah	50 m freestyle	DSQ		did not advance			
Yellow Yeiyah	50 m butterfly	25.56	50	did not advance			

Women

Athlete	Event	Heat		Semifinal		Final	
Athlete	Event	Time	Rank	Time	Rank	Time	Rank
Rachael Tonjor	50 m breaststroke	35.41	59	did not advance			
Rachael Tonjor	100 m breaststroke	1:19.81	55	did not advance			
