= Nigeria at the 2011 World Aquatics Championships =

- Flag of Nigeria
- FINA code: NGR
- National federation: Nigeria Swimming Federation

in Shanghai, China
- Competitors: 3 in 1 sport
- Medals: Gold 0 Silver 0 Bronze 0 Total 0

World Aquatics Championships appearances
- 1973; 1975; 1978; 1982; 1986; 1991; 1994; 1998; 2001; 2003; 2005; 2007; 2009; 2011; 2013; 2015; 2017; 2019; 2022; 2023; 2024

Nigeria competed at the 2011 World Aquatics Championships in Shanghai, China between July 16 and 31, 2011.

== Swimming ==
Nigeria qualified 3 swimmers.

Men

Athlete	Event	Heats		Semifinals		Final	
Athlete	Event	Time	Rank	Time	Rank	Time	Rank
Yellow Yeiyah	Men's 50m Freestyle	24.01	46	did not advance			
Yellow Yeiyah	Men's 50m Butterfly	25.41	35	did not advance			
Oluseyi Fatayi-Williams	Men's 100m Breaststroke	1:07.57	71	did not advance			
Oluseyi Fatayi-Williams	Men's 100m Butterfly	57.96	55	did not advance			

Women

Athlete	Event	Heats		Semifinals		Final	
Athlete	Event	Time	Rank	Time	Rank	Time	Rank
Ifiezegbe Gagbe	Women's 50m Freestyle	28.35	52	did not advance			
Ifiezegbe Gagbe	Women's 100m Freestyle	1:02.44	59	did not advance			
