= List of Togolese records in swimming =

The Togolese records in swimming are the fastest ever performances of swimmers from Togo, which are recognised and ratified by the Fédération Togolaise de Natation.

All records were set in finals unless noted otherwise.

== Long Course (50 m) ==
=== Men ===
Event	Time		Name	Club	Date	Meet	Location	Ref
50 m freestyle	25.68	h	Mawupemon Otogbe	Togo	30 July 2021	Olympic Games	Tokyo, Japan	
100 m freestyle	56.87	h	Mawupemon Otogbe	Togo	21 August 2019	African Games	Casablanca, Morocco	
200 m freestyle	2:07.87	h, †	Mawupemon Otogbe	Togo	21 July 2019	World Championships	Gwangju, South Korea	
400 m freestyle	4:25.30	h	Mawupemon Otogbe	Togo	21 July 2019	World Championships	Gwangju, South Korea	
800 m freestyle	9:20.11		Mawupemon Otogbe	Togo	21 August 2019	African Games	Casablanca, Morocco	
1500 m freestyle	17:51.34		Mawupemon Otogbe	Togo	25 July 2017	Criteria National ete Open Filles 16 ans et + Garcons 17 an	France	
50 m backstroke								
100 m backstroke								
200 m backstroke								
50 m breaststroke								
100 m breaststroke								
200 m breaststroke								
50 m butterfly	30.94	h	Magnim Daou	Togo	30 April 2024	African Championships	Luanda, Angola	
100 m butterfly								
200 m butterfly								
200 m individual medley								
400 m individual medley								
4×100 m freestyle relay								
4×200 m freestyle relay								
4×100 m medley relay								

Legend: # – Record awaiting ratification by Fédération Togolaise de Natation; WR – World record; AF – African record;
Records not set in finals: h – heat; sf – semifinal; r – relay 1st leg; rh – relay heat 1st leg; b – B final; † – en route to final mark; so – swim-off; tt – time trial

=== Women ===
Event	Time		Name	Club	Date	Meet	Location	Ref
50 m freestyle	32.26	h	Adzo Kpossi	Togo	29 July 2017	World Championships	Budapest, Hungary	
100 m freestyle								
200 m freestyle								
400 m freestyle								
800 m freestyle								
1500 m freestyle								
50 m backstroke								
100 m backstroke								
200 m backstroke								
50 m breaststroke								
100 m breaststroke								
200 m breaststroke								
50 m butterfly	28.90		Kenza Boukari	Togo	6 May 2026	African Championships	Oran, Algeria	
100 m butterfly	1:06.62		Kenza Boukari	Togo	7 May 2026	African Championships	Oran, Algeria	
200 m butterfly								
200 m individual medley								
400 m individual medley								
4×100 m freestyle relay								
4×200 m freestyle relay								
4×100 m medley relay								

Legend: # – Record awaiting ratification by Fédération Togolaise de Natation; WR – World record; AF – African record;
Records not set in finals: h – heat; sf – semifinal; r – relay 1st leg; rh – relay heat 1st leg; b – B final; † – en route to final mark; so – swim-off; tt – time trial

== Short Course (25 m) ==
=== Men ===
Event	Time		Name	Club	Date	Meet	Location	Ref
50 m freestyle	27.01		Mawupemon Otogbe	Togo	9 February 2019	Togo National Championships	Togo	
100 m freestyle	58.98		Mawupemon Otogbe	Togo	9 February 2019	Togo National Championships	Togo	
200 m freestyle								
400 m freestyle								
800 m freestyle								
1500 m freestyle								
50 m backstroke								
100 m backstroke								
200 m backstroke								
50 m breaststroke	37.99	h	Darshan Koffi	Togo	15 December 2018	World Championships	Hangzhou, China	
100 m breaststroke								
200 m breaststroke								
50 m butterfly								
100 m butterfly								
200 m butterfly								
100 m individual medley								
200 m individual medley								
400 m individual medley								
4×50 m freestyle relay								
4×100 m freestyle relay								
4×200 m freestyle relay								
4×50 m medley relay								
4×100 m medley relay								

Legend: # – Record awaiting ratification by Fédération Togolaise de Natation; WR – World record; AF – African record;
Records not set in finals: h – heat; sf – semifinal; r – relay 1st leg; rh – relay heat 1st leg; b – B final; † – en route to final mark; so – swim-off; tt – time trial

=== Women ===
Event	Time		Name	Club	Date	Meet	Location	Ref
50 m freestyle	29.55	h	Anna-Sica Guerard	Togo	15 December 2018	World Championships	Hangzhou, China	
100 m freestyle	1:05.51	h	Anna-Sica Guerard	Togo	12 December 2018	World Championships	Hangzhou, China	
200 m freestyle								
400 m freestyle								
800 m freestyle								
1500 m freestyle								
50 m backstroke								
100 m backstroke								
200 m backstroke								
50 m breaststroke								
100 m breaststroke								
200 m breaststroke								
50m butterfly	43.00	h	Rebecca Adzo Kpossi	Togo	13 December 2012	World Championships	Istanbul, Turkey	
100 m butterfly								
200 m butterfly								
100 m individual medley								
200 m individual medley								
400 m individual medley								
4×50 m freestyle relay								
4×100 m freestyle relay								
4×200 m freestyle relay								
4×50 m medley relay								
4×100 m medley relay								

Legend: # – Record awaiting ratification by Fédération Togolaise de Natation; WR – World record; AF – African record;
Records not set in finals: h – heat; sf – semifinal; r – relay 1st leg; rh – relay heat 1st leg; b – B final; † – en route to final mark; so – swim-off; tt – time trial
