= Mawupemon Otogbe =

Togolese swimmer (born 2003)

Personal information
- Nationality: Togolese
- Born: 23 January 2003 (age 22)

Sport
- Sport: Swimming

Mawupemon Otogbe (born 23 January 2003) is a Togolese swimmer. He competed in the men's 50 metre freestyle at the 2020 Summer Olympics.
