= Abiola Ogunbanwo =

Nigerian swimmer

Personal information
- Full name: Habibat Abiola Moyosore Ogunbanwo
- Born: 19 April 2004 (age 22) Lagos, Nigeria

Sport
- Sport: Swimming

Habibat Abiola Moyosore Ogunbanwo (born 19 April 2004 in Lagos, Nigeria) is a Nigerian swimmer. In 2019, she represented Nigeria at the 2019 World Aquatics Championships held in Gwangju, South Korea. She competed in the women's 100 metre freestyle and women's 200 metre freestyle events. In both events she did not advance to compete in the semi-finals.

In 2018, she competed in two events at the 2018 FINA World Swimming Championships (25 m) held in Hangzhou, China. In 2021, she competed in the women's 100 metre freestyle event at the 2020 Summer Olympics held in Tokyo, Japan.

She broke the longstanding Nigerian record of 1:00.50 when she finished the 100 meters swimming with 59.74 seconds in the 2020 Summer Olympics.

== Early life ==
Ogunbanwo was born in Nigeria and moved with her parents to Australia around 2008. She lived in Canberra, attended St Clare’s College, and trained at the Woden Valley Swim Club. In 2021 she moved to Kazan, Russia, to train at the FINA Development Centre for the (postponed) 2020 Olympics. In 2024 she was a student at the University of Canberra.

== Other work ==
Outside of her athletic career, she is a creative writer and was featured as a contributing poet in the 2025 Muslim-Australian anthology, Ritual.

She also serves as a youth co-researcher for the African Diaspora Youth Belonging project, focusing on exploring the cultural experiences and identities of African youth living in Australia.She has contributed to academia and media through this research. She co-authored a 2024 article in the student voice journal ReConnectEd examining the misrepresentation of African cultures in Australian schools. In December 2025, she featured as a commentator on the BBC World Service podcast What in the World, discussing the impacts of Australia's under-16 social media ban. She also co-authored an article for The Conversation detailing how the ban could disproportionately isolate and harm African diaspora youth.
