= Nigeria at the 2024 World Aquatics Championships =

- Flag of Nigeria
- FINA code: NGR
- National federation: Nigeria Aquatics Federation

in Doha, Qatar
- Competitors: 3 in 1 sport
- Medals: Gold 0 Silver 0 Bronze 0 Total 0

World Aquatics Championships appearances
- 1973; 1975; 1978; 1982; 1986; 1991; 1994; 1998; 2001; 2003; 2005; 2007; 2009; 2011; 2013; 2015; 2017; 2019; 2022; 2023; 2024

Nigeria competed at the 2024 World Aquatics Championships in Doha, Qatar from 2 to 18 February.

== Competitors ==
The following is the list of competitors in the Championships.

| Sport | Men | Women | Total |
|---|---|---|---|
| Swimming | 2 | 1 | 3 |
| Total | 2 | 1 | 3 |

== Swimming ==
Nigeria entered 3 swimmers.

Men

| Athlete | Event | Heat | | Semifinal | | Final | |
| Athlete | Event | Time | Rank | Time | Rank | Time | Rank |
|---|---|---|---|---|---|---|---|
| Colins Obi Ebingha | 50 metre freestyle | 23.80 | 59 | Did not advance | | | |
| Colins Obi Ebingha | 100 metre freestyle | 52.19 | 64 | Did not advance | | | |
| Clinton Opute | 100 metre butterfly | 56.95 | 49 | Did not advance | | | |
| Clinton Opute | 200 metre butterfly | 2:13.83 | 37 | Did not advance | | | |

Women

| Athlete | Event | Heat | | Semifinal | | Final | |
| Athlete | Event | Time | Rank | Time | Rank | Time | Rank |
|---|---|---|---|---|---|---|---|
| Adaku Nwandu | 100 metre freestyle | 59.83 | 44 | Did not advance | | | |
| Adaku Nwandu | 50 metre butterfly | 28.87 | 38 | Did not advance | | | |
