= Nigeria at the 2022 World Aquatics Championships =

- Flag of Nigeria
- FINA code: NGR
- National federation: Nigeria Swimming Federation

in Budapest, Hungary
- Competitors: 2 in 1 sport
- Medals: Gold 0 Silver 0 Bronze 0 Total 0

World Aquatics Championships appearances
- 1973; 1975; 1978; 1982; 1986; 1991; 1994; 1998; 2001; 2003; 2005; 2007; 2009; 2011; 2013; 2015; 2017; 2019; 2022; 2023; 2024

Nigeria competed at the 2022 World Aquatics Championships in Budapest, Hungary from 18 June to 3 July.

== Swimming ==
Athlete	Event	Heat		Semifinal		Final	
Athlete	Event	Time	Rank	Time	Rank	Time	Rank
Colins Obi Ebingha	Men's 100 m freestyle	51.53	58	did not advance			
Colins Obi Ebingha	Men's 50 m butterfly	24.61	47	did not advance			
Dorcas Abeng	Women's 50 m freestyle	28.14	55	did not advance			
Dorcas Abeng	Women's 100 m freestyle	1:01.54	44	did not advance			
