= Danilo Rosafio =

Kenyan swimmer (born 2001)

Personal information
- National team: (Kenya) Kenyan
- Born: 16 August 2001 (age 24) Nairobi, Kenya

Sport
- Sport: Swimming

Danilo Rosafio (born 16 August 2001) is a Kenyan swimmer. He represented Kenya at the 2019 World Aquatics Championships in Gwangju, South Korea. He competed in the men's 50 metre freestyle and men's 100 metre freestyle events. He also competed in the 4 × 100 metre mixed freestyle relay and 4 × 100 metre mixed medley relay events.

In March 2019, he was selected as one of the Kenyan athletes to receive a scholarship to help prepare and qualify for the 2020 Summer Olympics in Tokyo, Japan. He competed in the men's 100 metre freestyle event.

== Personal ==
Rosafio attended Millfield School.
