= Talisa Lanoe =

Kenyan swimmer (born 1994)

Personal information
- Born: 25 July 1994 (age 32) Nairobi, Kenya

Sport
- Sport: Swimming

Talisa Lanoe (born 25 July 1994) is a Kenyan swimmer. She competed in the women's 100 metre backstroke event at the 2016 Summer Olympics. She also competed at the 2015 African Games.
