= Chinelo Iyadi =

Nigerian swimmer (born 1998)

Personal information
- Born: February 2, 1998 (age 28)

Sport
- Sport: Swimming
- Strokes: Breaststroke

Chinelo Iyadi (born 2 February 1998) is a Nigerian swimmer who competes for Nigeria internationally. She emerged 44th Place for the women's 50m breaststroke during the 2019 World Aquatics Championships. She also competed in 100m breaststroke, 50m breaststroke women butterfly during the 2016 Confederation of African Swimming Association senior championships in Dakar, Senegal.

== Achievements ==
In 2018 Confederation of African Swimming Zone 2 Senior Championships, she won gold medal in the 50m breaststroke and 100m women butterfly.
