= Issa Mohamed =

Kenyan swimmer (born 1995)

Personal information
- Nationality: Kenyan
- Born: 1 March 1995 (age 31)

Sport
- Sport: Swimming

Issa Mohamed (born 1 March 1995) is a Kenyan swimmer. He competed in the men's 50 metre butterfly event at the 2017 World Aquatics Championships. In 2019, he represented Kenya at the 2019 African Games held in Rabat, Morocco.
