= Irene Prescott =

Tongan swimmer

Personal information
- Nationality: Tongan
- Born: 21 June 1994 (age 32)
- Height: 1.74 m (5 ft 8 1/2 in)
- Weight: 74 kg (163 lb)

Sport
- Sport: Swimming

Irene Prescott (born 21 June 1994) is a Tongan swimmer. She competed in the women's 50 metre freestyle event at the 2016 Summer Olympics, where she ranked 61st with a time of 28.68 seconds. She did not advance to the semifinals.
