= Noelani Day =

Tongan swimmer (born 2003)

Personal information
- Nationality: Tongan
- Born: 24 April 2003 (age 22)

Sport
- Sport: Swimming

Noelani Malia Day (born 24 April 2003) is a Tongan swimmer. She competed in the women's 50 metre freestyle at the 2019 World Aquatics Championships and she finished in 67th place. In 2021, she competed in the women's 50 metre freestyle event at the 2020 Summer Olympics held in Tokyo, Japan.

At the age of five, Day moved from the United States to her mother's home village of Holonga, Tonga.
