= Maria Brunlehner =

Kenyan swimmer (born 2000)

Personal information
- Full name: Maria Chantal Brunlehner
- Born: 1 April 2000 (age 26) Mombasa, Kenya

Sport
- Sport: Swimming
- Strokes: Freestyle
Medal record
Women's swimming
Representing Kenya
African Games
Bronze medal – third place	2019 Rabat	4x100m medley relay

Maria Brunlehner

Maria Chantal Brunlehner (born 1 April 2000) is a Kenyan swimmer. She competed in the women's 100 metre freestyle at the 2019 World Aquatics Championships. In 2019, she represented Kenya at the 2019 African Games held in Rabat, Morocco and she won the bronze medal in the women's 4 × 100 metre medley relay.

Her sister is Sylvia Brunlehner.
