= Amini Fonua =

Tongan swimmer (born 1989)

Amini Fonua OLY
Personal information
- Full name: Amini Tuitavake Britteon Fonua
- National team: Tonga
- Born: 14 December 1989 (age 36) Auckland, New Zealand
- Height: 1.83 m (6 ft 0 in)
- Weight: 79 kg (174 lb)

Sport
- Sport: Swimming
- Strokes: Breaststroke, Butterfly
- College team: Texas A&M University (U.S.)
- Coach: Sandra Burrow (1999–2007, 2015), Donna Bouzaid (2007–2008), Jay Holmes (2008–2012), Jon Winter (2012)
Medal record
Men's swimming
Representing Tonga
Pacific Games
| Gold medal – first place | 2015 Port Moresby | 50 m breaststroke |
| Gold medal – first place | 2015 Port Moresby | 100 m breaststroke |
| Gold medal – first place | 2015 Port Moresby | 200 m breaststroke |
| Silver medal – second place | 2011 Noumeá | 50 m breaststroke |
| Silver medal – second place | 2011 Noumeá | 200 m breaststroke |
| Bronze medal – third place | 2011 Noumeá | 100 m breaststroke |
Oceania Swimming Championships
| Gold medal – first place | 2010 Apia | 50 m breaststroke |
| Gold medal – first place | 2012 Nouméa | 50 m breaststroke |
| Bronze medal – third place | 2010 Apia | 100 m breaststroke |
| Bronze medal – third place | 2010 Apia | 50 m butterfly |
| Bronze medal – third place | 2012 Nouméa | 50 m butterfly |

Amini Tuitavake Britteon Fonua (born 14 December 1989) is a Tongan competitive swimmer.

== Career ==
Fonua's swimming career began at the Roskill Swimming Club based at Cameron Pool in Auckland, coached by Sandra Burrow from 1999 to 2007. He broke numerous Auckland and New Zealand Age Group Records under Burrow's tenure. He then moved to West Auckland Aquatics in 2007, and was coached by Donna Bouzaid. In the Fall of 2008, Fonua enrolled at Texas A&M on a swimming scholarship. While at Texas A&M he was a peer-voted team captain, Big XII Conference Champion, NCAA All-American, and recipient of The Aggie Heart Award. He graduated with a Telecommunication and Multi-Media degree, with a Minor in Creative Writing in May 2013.

He was the first Tongan swimmer to win a gold medal in international competition, when he took gold in the 50 metre breaststroke at the 2010 Oceania Swimming Championships.

In preparation for the 2012 London Olympics Fonua was trained by New Zealander and designated head coach for Tonga, Jon Winter. He served as his nation's flag-bearer in the 2012 Summer Olympics Parade of Nations. As a swimmer at the 2012 Summer Olympics, he competed in the Men's 100 metre breaststroke, failing to reach the semifinals.

Fonua made an international comeback at the 2015 Pacific Games in Port Moresby, Papua New Guinea. He created history by becoming the first ever Tongan athlete to ever win three gold medals at a Pacific Games by sweeping the Breaststroke events, setting two Games Records in the process (50 m and 100 m Breaststroke). He is the only Tongan athlete in history to ever hold dual Oceania and Pacific Games titles.

At the 2016 Olympics, he again competed in the 100 m breaststroke.

Fonua appeared on the Summer 2017 issue of Attitude.

== Personal life ==
Fonua was born and raised in Ponsonby, Auckland, New Zealand to Tongan lawyer Sione Fonua and British-born mother Julie. He holds dual Tongan and New Zealand citizenship. His family includes two sisters.

Fonua is openly gay and a vocal advocate for LGBT rights. After The Daily Beast published a contentious piece about athletes using Grindr at the 2016 Olympics, he criticized the article as 'deplorable', writing: "It is still illegal to be gay in Tonga, and while I’m strong enough to be me in front of the world, not everybody else is. Respect that."

Olympic Games
| Preceded by ʻAna Poʻuhila | Flagbearer for Tonga; London 2012 | Succeeded by Bruno Banani |
