= Yellow Yeiyah =

Nigerian swimmer

Personal information
- Nationality: Nigeria
- Born: 9 September 1984 (age 42) Ondo, Nigeria
- Height: 1.78 m (5 ft 10 in)

Sport
- Sport: Swimming
Medal record
Representing Nigeria
All-Africa Games
Silver medal – second place	2007 Algiers	50m Butterfly

Yellow Yei Yah (born 9 September 1984 in Ondo, Nigeria) is a Nigerian competitive swimmer who specializes in sprint freestyle and butterfly events. He is an Olympian and a multiple-time national record holder who later transitioned into open water swimming.

== Career ==
=== Pool Swimming and Olympics ===
Yeiyah made his international debut representing Nigeria at the 8th African Swimming Championships held in Dakar, Senegal, in September 2006. At this event, he posted a time of 26.04 seconds in the 50-metre butterfly, finishing seventh. He secured his first major continental podium at the 2007 All-Africa Games in Algiers, where he won a silver medal in the 50-metre butterfly.

He gained further international exposure at the 2007 FINA World Championships in Melbourne, Australia. During the championships, he competed in a high volume of events, including the 50-metre and 100-metre freestyle, 100-metre butterfly, 200-metre individual medley, and the 4x100-metre medley relay.

Yeiyah qualified for the 2008 Summer Olympics in Beijing, representing Nigeria in the men's 50-metre freestyle. Competing in Heat 6 during the preliminary rounds, he finished first in his heat with a time of 24.00 seconds.

=== Open Water Swimming ===
Following his Olympic appearance, Yeiyah transitioned to open water swimming in Nigeria. He was the consecutive winner of the 1.5-kilometre Five Cowrie Creek open water swimming competition, an event organized as part of the Lagos State Water Regatta, in both 2012 and 2013. He also secured a second-place finish at the 2014 Lagos Open Water Swimming Championships.

=== Personal bests ===
Yeiyah set multiple national standards during his career. His recorded personal best pool times include:

- 50m Freestyle: 23.86 sec
- 100m Freestyle: 54.17 sec
- 50m Butterfly: 24.46 sec (National Record)
- 100m Butterfly: 57.15 sec (National Record)
- 200m Individual Medley: 2:26.31
