= Emily Muteti =

Kenyan swimmer (born 1998)

Personal information
- Born: 14 June 1998 (age 28) Mombasa, Kenya

Sport
- Sport: Swimming
- College team: Grand Canyon University
Medal record
Women's swimming
Representing Kenya
African Games
Bronze medal – third place	2019 Rabat	4×100 m medley relay

Emily Muteti (born 14 June 1998) is a Kenyan swimmer. She competed in the women's 100 metre butterfly event at the 2017 World Aquatics Championships. In 2019, she represented Kenya at the 2019 African Games held in Rabat, Morocco and she won the bronze medal in the women's 4 × 100 metre medley relay.

She competed in the women's 50 metre freestyle event at the 2020 Summer Olympics.

She competes at the collegiate level for Grand Canyon University.
