= Finau Ohuafi =

Tongan swimmer

Personal information
- Born: 25 January 2001 (age 25)

Sport
- Sport: Swimming

Finau Ohuafi (born 25 January 2001) is a Tongan swimmer. He represented Tonga at the 2019 World Aquatics Championships in Gwangju, South Korea. He competed in the men's 50 metre freestyle and men's 100 metre freestyle events. He also competed in two relay events.

In 2017, he competed in short course swimming at the Asian Indoor and Martial Arts Games held in Ashgabat, Turkmenistan.

In 2018, he represented Tonga at the 2018 Commonwealth Games held in Gold Coast, Australia. He competed in the men's 50 metre backstroke, men's 50 metre butterfly and men's 50 metre freestyle events. In the same year, he also competed in several events at the 2018 FINA World Swimming Championships (25 m) in Hangzhou, China.

He represented Tonga at the 2022 Commonwealth Games held in Birmingham, England.
