= Flag of Kenya =

Republic of Kenya
- Use: National flag, civil and state ensign
- Proportion: 2:3
- Adopted: 12 December 1963; 62 years ago
- Design: A horizontal tricolour of black, white-edged red, and green with two crossed white spears behind a red, white, and black Maasai shield
- Designed by: Tom Mboya

The flag of Kenya (Bendera ya Kenya) is a tricolour of black, red, and green with two white edges imposed with a red, white and black Maasai shield and two crossed spears. The flag is mainly based on that of Kenya African National Union and was officially adopted on 12 December 1963 upon Kenya's independence.

== History ==
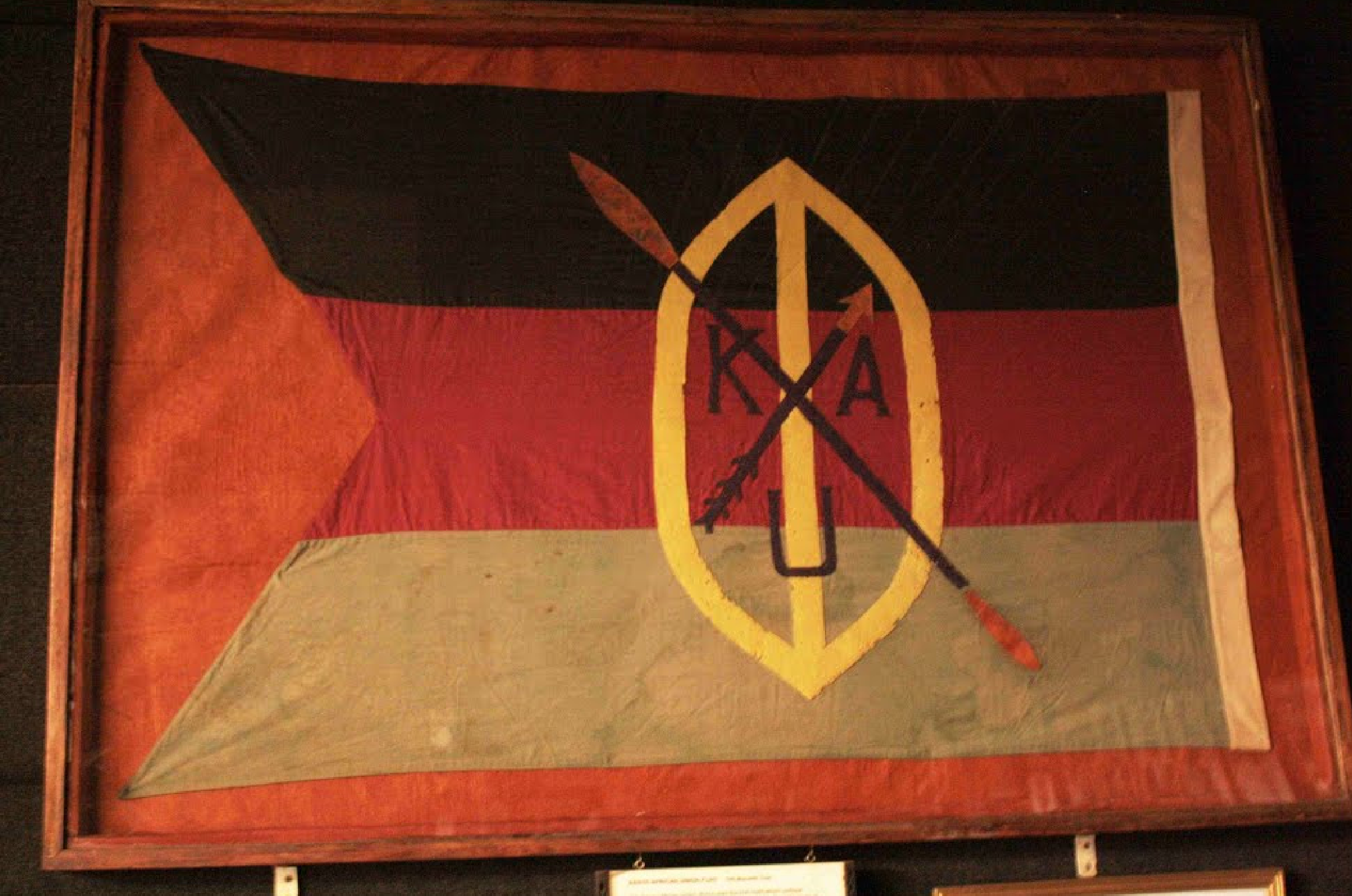
The original tricolour with the KAU emblem at its centre

In the years following World War II, the Kenya African Union was created and introduced a flag on September 3, 1951, which was a black and red bicolour with a shield and arrow at its centre. The next year it was altered into a black, red and the additional green tricolour with a shield crossed with a spear and arrow coupled with the initials "KAU" at its centre. The black stood for the native people, red for the common blood of all humanity and green for the nation's fertile land. The weapons were a reminder for the organized struggle that was the basis for independence. In the 1952 book Mau Mau from Within, Kenyatta's intentions were described differently: "What he said must mean that our fertile lands (green) could only be regained by the blood (red) of the African (black). The black was separated from the green by the red: The African could only get to his land through blood." The flag was later adopted by the Kenya African National Union (KANU), successor to the KAU, in May 1960 with the weapons being replaced with a rooster wielding a battle axe. The Kenya Africa Democratic Union (KADU) was formed a month after adopted a flag following its formation in June 1960. Its flag was a tricolour of a similar design to that of KANU but with white instead of red in the middle.

Black, Red and Green tricolour of the KANU as devised by Jomo Kenyatta

Flag of the Kenya Africa Democratic Union (KADU)

Some officials wanted to use the KANU flag as the national flag. This was influenced by Tanganyika and Uganda's choices to use the ruling party's flag as the national flag. Tom Mboya, one of Kenya's founding fathers, warned against using the KANU flag to avoid further politically polarizing the country. A committee set up by Jomo Kenyatta came up with a compromise that everyone could agree on. This was achieved by combining flags of the two rivaling parties, the KANU flag and that of KADU with the addition the white fimbriations (which were originally to symbolize Kenya's multiracial society as they did in KADU's flag but were changed to symbolize peace and unity), a modified Maasai shield crossed with spears, reminiscent to the original KAU flag, were also added. The colours of the flag and their symbolism were inspired by and match closely to those of the Pan-African flag adopted by the Universal Negro Improvement Association and African Communities League in 1920.

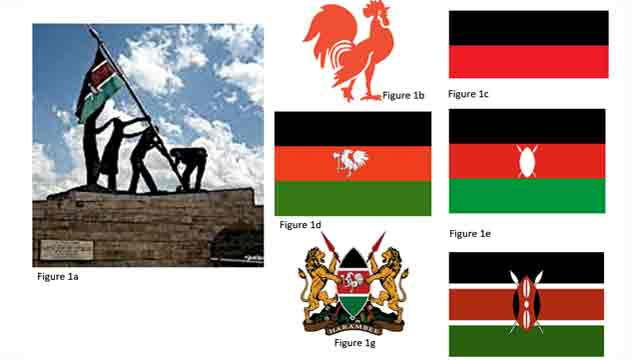
Independence Monument of Kenya, Uhuru Gardens, Nairobi (Figure 1a), The KANU emblem (Figure 1b), The original KAU bicolor (Figure 1c), The KANU flag (Figure 1d), KANU flag variant (Figure 1e) and the Coat of Arms of Kenya (Figure 1g) next to the national flag

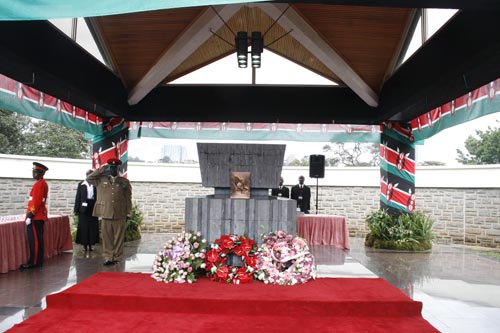
Kenyan flags at the Kenyatta Mausoleum

The 2010 revised edition of the Constitution of Kenya includes specifications of the Kenyan flag, located in the Second Schedule, Article 9, paragraph 6.2.

== Symbolism ==
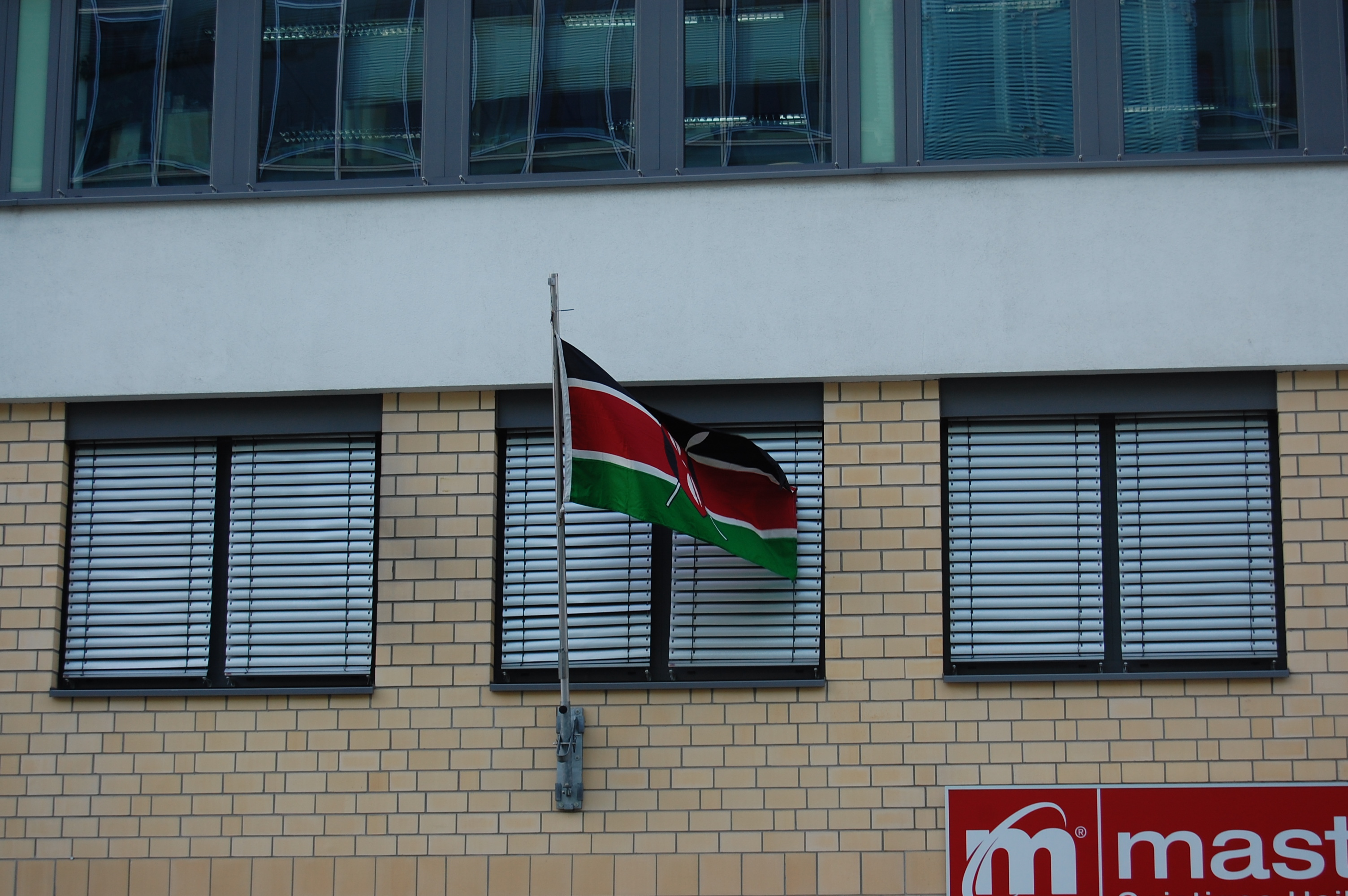
The flag at the Kenyan Embassy in Berlin

The Kenyan flag includes symbols of unity, peace, and defence of the country. The colour black represents the African continent, red represents the bloodshed during the fight for independence from the British colonialism, and green represents the country's landscape and natural wealth. The white fimbriation was added later to symbolise peace, honesty, purity, and innocence. The black, red, and white traditional African shield and two spears symbolise the defence of all the things mentioned above. Many of both colours and symbolic values are shared with the flag of South Sudan.

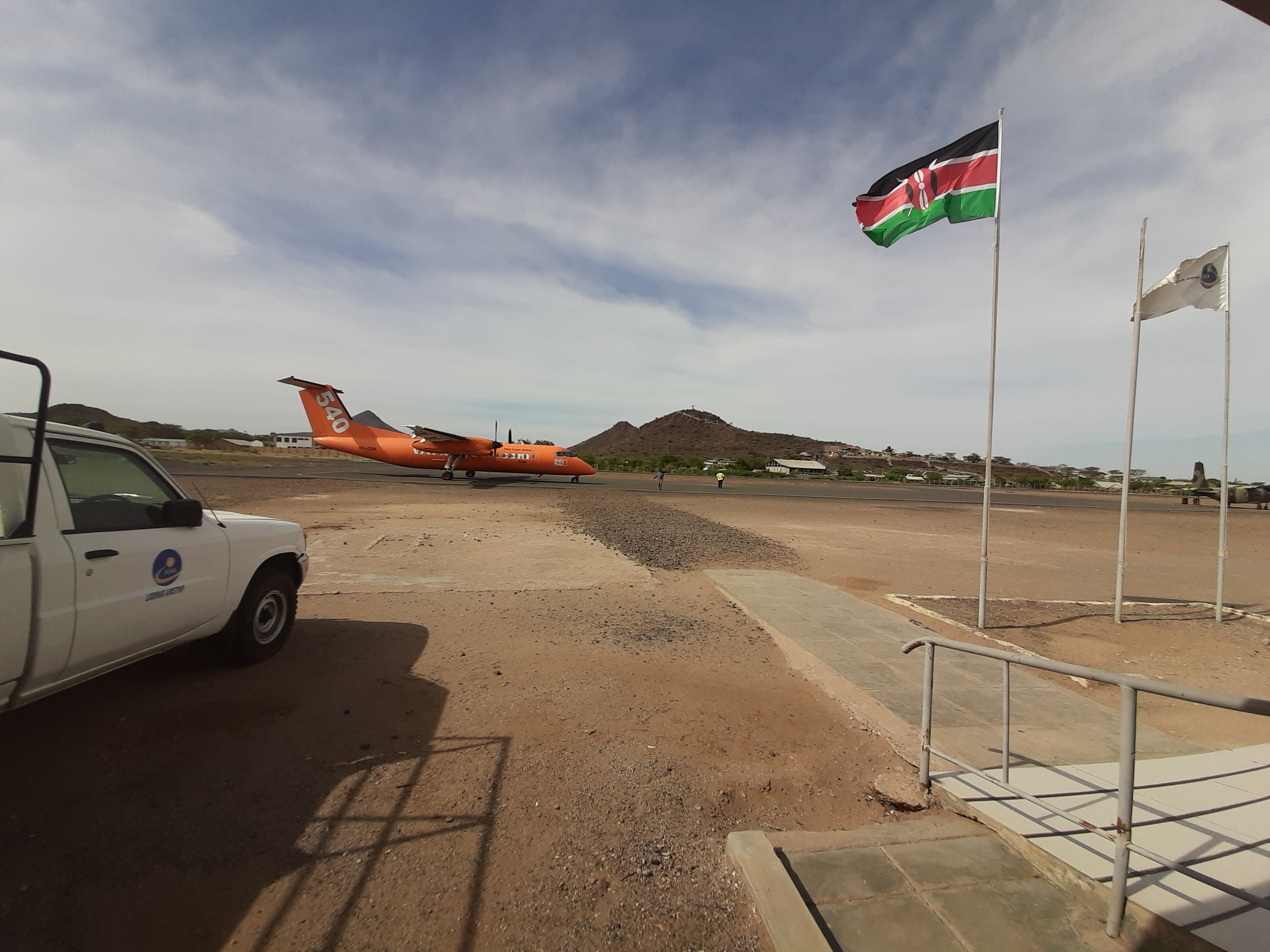
Kenyan flag at Lodwar Airport

== Design ==
The colours of the flag are specified in the Constitution in terms of British Standard 2660.

Colors scheme	Black	Red	Green	White
HEX	#000000	#922529	#008C51	#FFFFFF
RGB	0, 0, 0	146, 37, 41	0, 140, 81	255, 255, 255
CMYK	0, 0, 0, 100	0, 75, 72, 43	100, 0, 42, 45	0, 0, 0, 0
British Standard	00-E-53 (Black)	2660-0006 (Post-Office Red)	2660-0010 (Paris/Vir. Green)	0-E-55 (White)

== Construction sheet ==
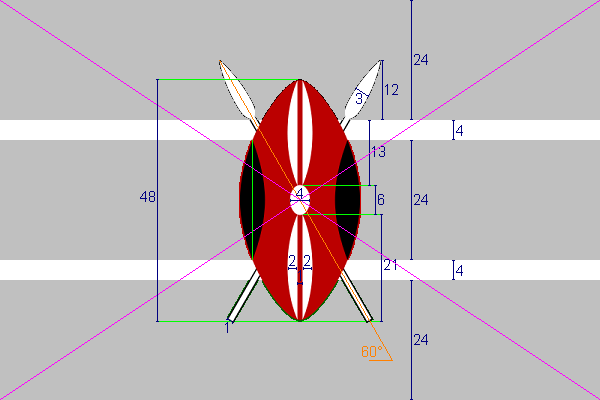
Construction sheet of the flag of Kenya

== Variants ==
=== Historical presidential standards ===
First Presidential Standard of Kenya (1963–1970)

Presidential Standard of Jomo Kenyatta

Presidential Standard of Daniel Arap Moi

Presidential Standard of Mwai Kibaki

Presidential Standard of Uhuru Kenyatta

Presidential Standard of William Ruto, Incumbent President of Kenya

=== Defence forces ===
Flag of Kenya Defence Forces

Flag of Kenya Army

Flag of Kenya Air Force

Flag of Kenya Navy

Presidential Colour of the Navy

=== Variants ===
Flag of Kenya with the coat of arms.

== Historical flags ==
Imperial British East Africa Company (1888–1895)

East Africa Protectorate (1895–1921)

Colony and Protectorate of Kenya (1921–1963)

Flag of the Dominion of Kenya (1963–1964); flag of the Republic of Kenya (1964–Present)

== See also ==
- List of flags of Kenya
- Flag of South Sudan (similar design)

== Sources ==
- Kenyan Flag at Get Kenya Online. Accessed 6 August 2006.
- Flag Specifications at Kenya National Archives. Accessed 16 Feb 2006.
