= Tonga at the 2011 World Aquatics Championships =

Sporting event delegation

Flag of Tonga

Tonga competed at the 2011 World Aquatics Championships in Shanghai, China between July 16 and 31, 2011.

== Swimming ==
Tonga qualified 2 swimmers.

Men

Athlete	Event	Heats		Semifinals		Final	
Athlete	Event	Time	Rank	Time	Rank	Time	Rank
Amini Fonua	Men's 50m Breaststroke	28.23	25	did not advance			
Amini Fonua	Men's 100m Breaststroke	1:04.02	59	did not advance			
Ifalemi Paea	Men's 50m Butterfly	25.50	36	did not advance			
Ifalemi Paea	Men's 100m Butterfly	56.60	49	did not advance			
