= Flag of Tonga =

Kingdom of Tonga
- Use: Civil and state flag, civil and state ensign
- Proportion: 1:2
- Adopted: 4 November 1875; 151 years ago
- Design: A red field with the white rectangle on the upper hoist-side corner bearing the red Greek Cross in the centre.
- Designed by: Uelingatoni Ngu Tupoumalohi
- Naval Ensign of Tonga
- Use: Naval ensign
- Proportion: 1:2
- Royal Standard of Tonga
- Use: Royal standard
- Proportion: 39:55

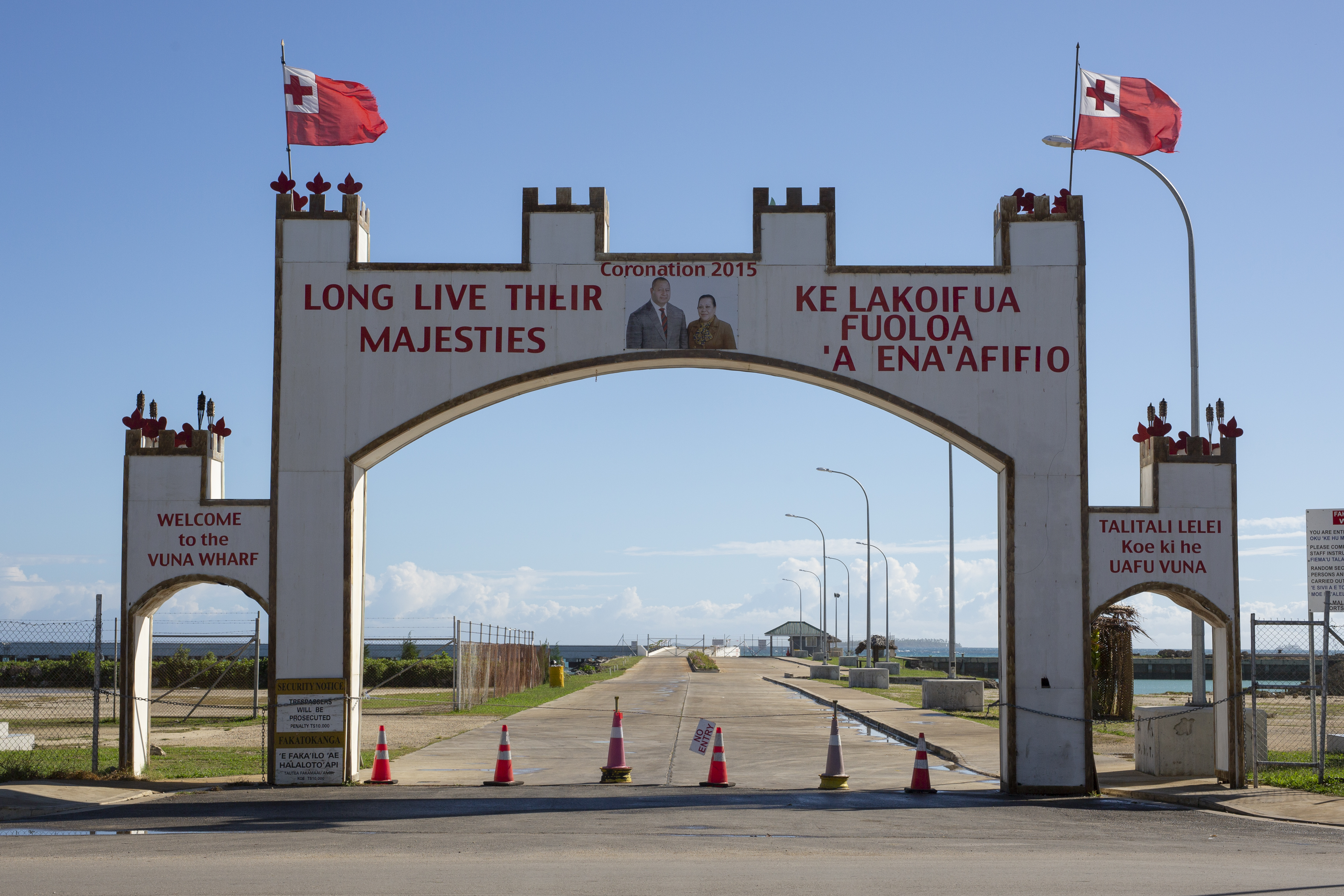
Tonga flags flying above a ceremonial gate in Nuku'alofa to celebrate the coronation of Tupou VI

The national flag of Tonga consists of a red field with a white canton charged with a red couped cross. Adopted in 1875 after being officially enshrined into the nation's constitution, it has been the flag of the Kingdom of Tonga since that year. The constitution stipulates that the national flag can never be changed.

== History ==
The British first arrived in Tonga in the late-18th century, when Captain James Cook made three visits to the islands between 1773 and 1777. Approximately fifty years later, English Wesleyan Methodist missionaries came to Tonga and began converting its people to Christianity. In 1831, they succeeded in converting "paramount chief" Taufa'ahau Tupou, who became King George Tupou I in 1845. It was during this time (circa 1840s) that the first Tongan flag was adopted. It consisted of a white field with a cross (either red or blue in colour) at all four corners, and the letters "A" (in red) and "M" (in blue) at the centre that symbolise the king.

Upon his accession to the throne, the king sought to design a new flag for the nation, one that would represent Christianity. He befriended Shirley Waldemar Baker – a member of the United Kingdom's Tongan mission who later became the Prime Minister of Tonga – and they worked together to formulate a new flag, coat of arms and national anthem for Tonga. According to Whitney Smith (Flags and Arms across the World, Maidenhead 1980) the chief designer was Prince Uelingatoni Ngu Tupoumalohi. The new design resembled the British Red Ensign, in that three-quarters of it consisted of a simple red field, with a "distinctive canton" featured in the upper hoist section; this was first used in 1866. A new constitution for the kingdom was formulated and proclaimed on 4 November 1875. It codified the new flag design, and marks when it was adopted as the national flag. Under Article 47 of the Constitution, the flag can "never be altered" and "shall always be the flag" of Tonga.

== Design ==
=== Symbolism ===
The colours and symbols of the flag carry cultural, political, and regional meanings. The red couped cross alludes to Christianity, the religion practised by approximately 97% of the country's population. It is one of 28 national flags to contain overtly Christian symbols. The white epitomizes purity, while the red evokes the sacrifice of the blood of Jesus Christ, which was shed during his crucifixion.

Construction sheet flag

=== Similarities ===
The previous design of the flag featured a plain white field charged with the red couped cross. However, it was later discovered that this flag was almost identical to the emblem of the International Red Cross, which had been adopted in 1863. As a result of this finding, the Tongan flag was set at the canton of a red field instead, leading to the present design of the flag. The previous design, nonetheless, remains a national symbol of Tonga. The current flag of Tonga also has some similarities with the flags of Switzerland and Georgia.

== Gallery ==
Flag of the Tonga Defence Services

Customs Service Ensign

Quarantine Ensign

Pilot flag, which is similar to the Polish flag

=== Historical flags ===
Tongatapu (1845–1862)

Tonga (1862–1866), similar to the flag of the Red Cross, used as the jack of Tonga

Royal Standard of Tonga (1862–1875).

== See also ==
- Flag of the Red Cross
- Flag of Switzerland
