= Charissa Panuve =

Tongan swimmer

Personal information
- Born: 19 November 1994 (age 31)

Sport
- Sport: Swimming

Charissa Panuve (born 19 November 1994) is a Tongan swimmer. She represented Tonga at the 2019 World Aquatics Championships held in Gwangju, South Korea. She competed in the women's 100 metre freestyle and women's 200 metre freestyle events. In both events she did not advance to compete in the semi-finals.

In 2018, she represented Tonga at the Commonwealth Games in Gold Coast, Australia. She also represented Tonga at the 2022 Commonwealth Games in Birmingham, England.
