= Swimming at the 2025 World Aquatics Championships – Men's 50 metre freestyle =

Men's 50 metre freestyle at the 2025 World Aquatics Championships
- Venue: World Aquatics Championships Arena
- Location: Singapore Sports Hub, Kallang
- Dates: 1 August (heats and semifinals); 2 August (final)
- Competitors: 116 from 108 nations
- Winning time: 21.14

Medalists
gold medal	Cameron McEvoy	Australia
silver medal	Ben Proud	Great Britain
bronze medal	Jack Alexy	United States

The men's 50 metre freestyle event at the 2025 World Aquatics Championships was held from 1 to 2 August 2025 at the World Aquatics Championships Arena at the Singapore Sports Hub in Kallang, Singapore.

Cameron McEvoy of Australia was the favourite to win the event, while Great Britain's Ben Proud and the United States' Jack Alexy were also in contention. In the final, McEvoy led the race from beginning to end, to win with a time of 21.14. Proud finished second with 21.26, and Alexy came third with 21.46. McEvoy's win made him Australia's oldest world swimming champion, at 31 years old.

== Background ==
Cameron McEvoy of Australia, the reigning Olympic champion and world leader with a time of 21.30 in 2025, was regarded by SwimSwam as the favourite to win the event, while Great Britain's Ben Proud, a consistent podium finisher since 2022, was anticipated to contend for gold. The United States' Jack Alexy, second in world rankings with 21.36, was aiming to return to form after missing the U.S. Olympic team for this event in 2024. Brazil's Gui Caribé and Russia's Egor Kornev, who was competing for the Neutral Athletes B team, were also chasing podium finishes. The defending world champion was Vladyslav Bukhov of Ukraine, though his recent results had been inconsistent. The event was held at the World Aquatics Championships Arena at the Singapore Sports Hub in Kallang, Singapore.

== Qualification ==
Each National Federation was permitted to enter a maximum of two qualified athletes in each individual event, but only if both of them had attained the "A" standard qualification time at approved qualifying events. For this event, the "A" standard qualification time was 22.05 seconds. Federations could enter one athlete into the event if they met the "B" standard qualification time. For this event, the "B" standard qualification time was 22.82. Athletes could also enter the event if they had met an "A" or "B" standard in a different event and their Federation had not entered anyone else. Additional considerations applied to Federations who had few swimmers enter through the standard qualification times. Federations in this category could at least enter two men and two women into the competition, all of whom could enter into up to two events.

Top 10 fastest qualification times (Note: Only including swimmers who were on the start list for this event)
Swimmer	Country	Time	Competition
Cameron McEvoy	Australia	21.25	2024 Summer Olympics
Benjamin Proud	Great Britain	21.25	2024 British Championships
Jack Alexy	United States	21.36	2025 United States Championships
Egor Kornev	Neutral Athletes B	21.43	2025 Russian Championships
Guilherme Caribé	Brazil	21.46	2025 Brazilian Championships
Josh Liendo	Canada	21.48	2024 Canadian Trials
Leonardo Deplano	Italy	21.50	2024 Summer Olympics
Meiron Cheruti	Israel	21.60	2025 Israeli Trials
Maxime Grousset	France	21.60	2024 Summer Olympics
Lorenzo Zazzeri	Italy	21.64	2024 Summer Olympics

== Heats ==
The heats took place on 1 August 2025 at 10:51 in the morning. The swimmers with the best 16 times in the heats advanced to the semifinals. Serbia's Andrej Barna swam the fastest qualifying time of 21.44, which broke his country's national record in the event. Alexy and Kornev tied with the second fastest qualification time of 21.52. The top 16 swimmers all finished with times within less than half a second of one another.

Since Martin Kartavi of Israel and Santo Condorelli of the United States tied for the sixteenth fastest time of 21.91, they were scheduled to compete in a swim-off later in the day, to determine who would qualify for the semifinals.

Results
Rank	Heat	Lane	Swimmer	Nation	Time	Notes
1	12	7	Andrej Barna	Serbia	21.44	Q, NR
2	11	4	Jack Alexy	United States	21.52	Q
2	13	5	Egor Kornev	Neutral Athletes B	21.52	Q
4	12	4	Cameron McEvoy	Australia	21.53	Q
5	13	3	Leonardo Deplano	Italy	21.62	Q
6	12	3	Meiron Cheruti	Israel	21.64	Q
7	12	5	Guilherme Caribé	Brazil	21.67	Q
8	13	4	Ben Proud	Great Britain	21.71	Q
9	10	1	Ji Yu-chan	South Korea	21.80	Q
10	12	1	Ian Ho	Hong Kong	21.82	Q, NR
11	11	0	Szebasztián Szabó	Hungary	21.83	Q
11	12	6	Vladyslav Bukhov	Ukraine	21.83	Q
13	13	0	Jere Hribar	Croatia	21.86	Q
14	13	6	Lorenzo Zazzeri	Italy	21.87	Q
14	13	7	Thomas Fannon	Ireland	21.87	Q
16	10	5	Martin Kartavi	Israel	21.91	S/off
16	13	2	Santo Condorelli	United States	21.91	S/off
18	11	1	Kliment Kolesnikov	Neutral Athletes B	21.95	
19	10	9	Mikel Schreuders	Aruba	22.02	
20	10	7	Lamar Taylor	Bahamas	22.05	=NR
20	11	6	Kyle Chalmers	Australia	22.05	
22	10	8	Sergio de Celis	Spain	22.06	
22	11	2	Stergios Bilas	Greece	22.06	
22	12	0	Renzo Tjon-A-Joe	Netherlands	22.06	
22	12	2	Nikita Baez	France	22.06	
26	12	8	Diogo Ribeiro	Portugal	22.08	
27	10	0	Heiko Gigler	Austria	22.12	
28	13	9	Jacob Mills	Great Britain	22.15	
29	10	4	Mikkel Lee	Singapore	22.18	
30	9	6	Matej Duša	Slovakia	22.22	
30	11	5	Josh Liendo	Canada	22.22	
32	9	0	Jānis Dzirkalis	Latvia	22.27	NR
32	9	5	Elias Persson	Sweden	22.27	
34	10	3	Božo Puhalović	Croatia	22.28	
35	9	2	David Young	Fiji	22.32	
36	11	8	Abdelrahman Sameh	Egypt	22.35	
37	11	7	Victor Alcará	Brazil	22.37	
38	8	4	Samyar Abdoli	Iran	22.41	NR
38	10	6	Akira Namba	Japan	22.41	
40	9	4	Remi Fabiani	Luxembourg	22.42	
41	9	3	Bjørnar Laskerud	Norway	22.48	
41	10	2	Kaloyan Bratanov	Bulgaria	22.48	
43	12	9	Dylan Carter	Trinidad and Tobago	22.51	
44	13	8	Piotr Ludwiczak	Poland	22.52	
45	8	7	Leo Nolles	Uruguay	22.60	
46	9	1	Daniel Zaitsev	Estonia	22.64	
47	9	8	Ali Sayed	Qatar	22.72	
48	8	6	Marwane Sebbata	Morocco	22.73	NR
49	8	5	Frederik Lentz	Denmark	22.76	
50	8	3	Jakub Krischke	Czech Republic	22.79	
51	8	2	Javier Núñez	Dominican Republic	22.82	
52	9	9	Adilbek Mussin	Kazakhstan	22.84	
53	9	7	Tajus Juška	Lithuania	22.88	
54	8	8	Gabriel Martinez	Honduras	23.02	
55	8	0	Harry Stacey	Ghana	23.05	
56	2	8	William Birkett	Ecuador	23.17	
57	8	9	Stefano Mitchell	Antigua and Barbuda	23.18	
58	6	4	Damien Shamambo	Zambia	23.42	NR
59	7	6	Constantin Malachi	Moldova	23.44	
60	7	4	Grisi Koxhaku	Albania	23.47	
61	7	2	Julio Rodríguez	Panama	23.48	
62	2	6	Erick Blandón	Nicaragua	23.57	
63	6	5	Musa Zhalayev	Turkmenistan	23.71	
64	7	5	Yousuf Al-Matrooshi	United Arab Emirates	23.77	
65	1	7	Clinton Opute	Nigeria	23.79	
65	7	7	Johann Stickland	Samoa	23.79	
67	6	7	Mohamed Aan Hussain	Maldives	23.81	NR
68	6	6	Aryaan Din	Pakistan	23.87	
69	7	8	Adam Moncherry	Seychelles	23.88	NR
70	7	0	Tendo Mukalazi	Uganda	23.92	
71	1	2	Alexandre Grand'Pierre	Haiti	23.97	
72	7	9	Belly-Cresus Ganira	Burundi	23.99	
73	6	1	Aaron Ghebre Owusu	Eritrea	24.17	
74	6	3	Joash McKonie	Zimbabwe	24.21	
75	6	2	Christien Kelly	Barbados	24.27	
76	5	5	Levon Kocharyan	Armenia	24.42	
77	3	7	Jeno Heyns	Suriname	24.44	
77	4	3	Joel Ling	Brunei	24.44	
79	5	4	Janel Yondu Tati	Angola	24.52	
80	3	0	Mahmoud Abu Gharbieh	Palestine	24.55	
81	5	3	Ardasher Gadoev	Tajikistan	24.63	
82	6	8	Josh Tarere	Papua New Guinea	24.73	
83	6	0	Ando Francky Ramiakatrarivo	Madagascar	24.80	
84	5	6	Kazuumi Nestor	Palau	24.88	NR
85	5	2	Nigel Fontenelle	Sint Maarten	25.00	
86	4	2	Jose Tati	Cape Verde	25.09	
87	2	5	Ajal Kaji Tamrakar	Nepal	25.16	
88	3	8	Michael Miller	Northern Mariana Islands	25.28	
89	1	3	Pieter Sok Kha Vanoosten	Cambodia	25.52	
90	2	7	Ahmed Al-Mutairy	Iraq	25.56	
90	5	7	Ethan Gardiner	Turks and Caicos Islands	25.56	
92	5	1	Camil Doua	Mauritania	25.76	NR
93	5	0	Yousif Ibrahim	Sudan	25.87	
94	5	8	Asher Banda	Malawi	25.92	
95	5	9	Sangay Tenzin	Bhutan	26.11	
96	4	5	Elhadj N'Gnane Diallo	Guinea	26.13	NR
97	4	4	Leo Nzimbi	Central African Republic	26.23	NR
98	4	7	Ousman Jobe	The Gambia	26.72	NR
99	2	9	Lassina Bel Traore	Ivory Coast	26.84	
100	3	9	Ryuto Saysanavongphet	Laos	26.99	
101	2	3	Michael Mponezya Joseph	Tanzania	27.06	
102	2	0	Yann Emmanuel Douma	Republic of the Congo	27.49	
103	4	8	Charly Ndjoume	Cameroon	27.80	
104	4	6	Magnim Jordano Daou	Togo	27.88	
105	4	1	Phillip Kinono	Marshall Islands	27.90	
106	3	1	Kevin Kaiga	Rwanda	27.92	
107	2	2	Yusuf Marwan Abdullah Nasser	Yemen	28.00	
108	2	1	Temkin Getachew	Ethiopia	28.14	
108	4	9	Pedro Rogery	Guinea-Bissau	28.14	NR
110	1	6	Jehu Matondo Bosange Zozo	Democratic Republic of the Congo	28.15	NR
111	1	4	Brenton Naka	Solomon Islands	28.35	
112	3	5	Sekou Alioune Badara Traore	Mali	28.57	
113	3	6	Marouane Mamane Hamissou Abba	Niger	29.40	
114	3	3	Jolanio Guterres	Timor-Leste	30.01	
115	3	2	Thabo Motsopa	Lesotho	31.98	
116	2	4	Jonathan Irizarry	Anguilla	37.68	
	1	5	Fabio Barros dos Santos	São Tomé and Príncipe	Did not start	
	3	4	Higinio Ndong Obama	Equatorial Guinea	Did not start	
	4	0	Moses Yongai	Sierra Leone	Did not start	
	6	9	Kyle Abeysinghe	Sri Lanka	Did not start	
	7	1	Alaa Maso	Athlete Refugee Team	Did not start	
	7	3	Oussama Sahnoune	Algeria	Did not start	
	8	1	Alexander Santiago	Puerto Rico	Did not start	
	11	3	Maxime Grousset	France	Did not start	
	11	9	Sean Niewold	Netherlands	Did not start	
	13	1	David Popovici	Romania	Did not start	

=== Swim-off ===
The swim-off was started on 1 August at 12:44. Condorelli won, which qualified him for the semifinals.

Results
Rank	Lane	Name	Nationality	Time	Notes
1	5	Santo Condorelli	United States	21.83	Q
2	4	Martin Kartavi	Israel	21.94	

== Semifinals ==
The semifinals took place on 1 August at 19:34. The swimmers with the best eight times in the semifinals advanced to the final. McEvoy qualified with the fastest time of 21.30, followed by Alexy, Barna, Kornev, Italy's Leonardo Deplano, Proud, and then Condorelli.

Israel's Meiron Cheruti and South Korea's Ji Yu-chan tied for the eighth fastest time of 21.77, meaning they were scheduled to compete in a swim-off later in the evening.

Results
Rank	Heat	Lane	Swimmer	Nation	Time	Notes
1	1	5	Cameron McEvoy	Australia	21.30	Q
2	1	4	Jack Alexy	United States	21.32	Q
3	2	4	Andrej Barna	Serbia	21.45	Q
4	2	5	Egor Kornev	Neutral Athletes B	21.51	Q
5	2	3	Leonardo Deplano	Italy	21.59	Q
6	1	6	Ben Proud	Great Britain	21.61	Q
7	1	8	Santo Condorelli	United States	21.68	Q
8	1	3	Meiron Cheruti	Israel	21.77	S/off
8	2	2	Ji Yu-chan	South Korea	21.77	S/off
10	2	6	Guilherme Caribé	Brazil	21.78	
11	2	1	Jere Hribar	Croatia	21.79	
12	2	8	Thomas Fannon	Ireland	21.81	
13	1	7	Vladyslav Bukhov	Ukraine	21.82	
14	2	7	Szebasztián Szabó	Hungary	21.84	
15	1	1	Lorenzo Zazzeri	Italy	21.87	
16	1	2	Ian Ho	Hong Kong	22.15	

=== Swim-off ===
The swim-off was started on 1 August at 20:58. Ji won with a new Asian record of 21.66, qualifying for the final.

Results
Rank	Lane	Name	Nationality	Time	Notes
1	5	Ji Yu-chan	South Korea	21.66	Q, AS
2	4	Meiron Cheruti	Israel	21.74	

== Final ==
The final took place on 2 August at 19:09. McEvoy had the fastest reaction time and led to the end of the race to win gold with a time of 21.14. Proud won silver with 21.26, and Alexy took bronze with 21.46.

McEvoy and Proud finished in the same positions they did at the Paris Olympics the year prior, but both of them swam faster times. The podium also contained the same three swimmers as it did in 2023, with Proud and Alexy swapped in second and third. McEvoy's time was the 11th fastest ever in this event, and his win made him Australia's oldest world swimming champion, at 31 years old.

Results
Rank	Lane	Name	Nationality	Time
1st place, gold medalist(s)	4	Cameron McEvoy	Australia	21.14
2nd place, silver medalist(s)	7	Ben Proud	Great Britain	21.26
3rd place, bronze medalist(s)	5	Jack Alexy	United States	21.46
4	2	Leonardo Deplano	Italy	21.52
5	6	Egor Kornev	Neutral Athletes B	21.53
6	3	Andrej Barna	Serbia	21.60
7	8	Ji Yu-chan	South Korea	21.71
8	1	Santo Condorelli	United States	21.73

== Further information ==
- "Swimming World Championships Swimming – Men's 50m Freestyle Final". english.news.cn. Xinhuanet. 3 August 2025. Archived from the original on 26 May 2026. – Photos from the event

== Sources ==
- "Competition Regulations" (PDF). World Aquatics. Archived (PDF) from the original on 13 February 2026.
