= Bhutan at the 2025 World Aquatics Championships =

- Flag of Bhutan
- World Aquatics code: BHU
- National federation: Bhutan Aquatics Federation

in Singapore
- Competitors: 2 in 1 sport
- Medals: Gold 0 Silver 0 Bronze 0 Total 0

World Aquatics Championships appearances
- 2019; 2022; 2023; 2024; 2025

Bhutan is competing at the 2025 World Aquatics Championships in Singapore from 11 July to 3 August 2025.

== Competitors ==
The following is the list of competitors in the Championships.

Sport	Men	Women	Total
Swimming	2	0	2
Total	2	0	2

== Swimming ==
Men

Athlete	Event	Heat		Semifinal		Final	
Athlete	Event	Time	Rank	Time	Rank	Time	Rank
Kinley Lhendup	50 m butterfly	28.53	89	Did not advance			
Sangay Tenzin	50 m freestyle	26.11	95	Did not advance			
Sangay Tenzin	100 m freestyle	57.43	96	Did not advance			
