= Democratic Republic of the Congo at the 2025 World Aquatics Championships =

- Flag of Democratic Republic of the Congo
- World Aquatics code: COD
- National federation: Federation de Natation en Republique Democratique de Congo

in Singapore
- Competitors: 2 in 1 sport
- Medals: Gold 0 Silver 0 Bronze 0 Total 0

World Aquatics Championships appearances
- 2013; 2015–2019; 2022; 2023; 2024; 2025

Democratic Republic of the Congo competed at the 2025 World Aquatics Championships in Singapore from 11 July to 3 August 2025.

== Competitors ==
The following is the list of competitors in the Championships.

Sport	Men	Women	Total
Swimming	2	0	2
Total	2	0	2

== Swimming ==
Men

Athlete	Event	Heat		Semifinal		Final	
Athlete	Event	Time	Rank	Time	Rank	Time	Rank
Jehu Matondo Bosange Zozo	50 m freestyle	28.15	110	Did not advance			
Jehu Matondo Bosange Zozo	50 m breaststroke	39.29	77	Did not advance			
Jacob Mugisha	100 m freestyle	1:00.17	99	Did not advance			
Jacob Mugisha	50 m butterfly	30.38	96	Did not advance			
