= Vladyslav Bukhov =

Ukrainian swimmer (born 2002)

Personal information
- Nationality: Ukrainian
- Born: 5 July 2002 (age 24) Donetsk, Ukraine
- Height: 1.96 m (6 ft 5 in)

Sport
- Sport: Swimming
- Strokes: Freestyle, Butterfly
Medal record
Men's swimming
Representing Ukraine
World Championships (LC)
Gold medal – first place	2024 Doha	50 m freestyle
European Championships (LC)
Bronze medal – third place	2024 Belgrade	50 m freestyle
European Junior Championships
Bronze medal – third place	2019 Kazan	50 m freestyle
Bronze medal – third place	2019 Kazan	100 m freestyle
World Junior Championships
Gold medal – first place	2019 Budapest	50 m freestyle
European U23 Championships
Gold medal – first place	2023 Dublin	Skins race
Silver medal – second place	2025 Samorin	50 m freestyle
Silver medal – second place	2025 Samorin	50 m butterfly
Bronze medal – third place	2023 Dublin	50 m freestyle

Vladyslav Serhiyovych Bukhov (Ukrainian: Владислав Сергійович Бухов, born 5 July 2002) is a Ukrainian swimmer who specialises in the 50-metre freestyle event. Bukhov won gold in the 50-metre freestyle event at the 2024 World Aquatics Championships.

As a junior swimmer, Bukhov won several international medals, including gold at the 2019 World Junior Championships and two bronzes at the 2019 European Junior Championships. He also broke the world junior record in the 50-metre butterfly with a time of 23.14 seconds.

Bukhov has also competed at the 2020 and 2024 Summer Olympics, at the 2022, 2023, 2024 and 2025 World Aquatics Championships, and at various European Championships and European U-23 Championships. In addition to his gold in the 50-metre freestyle at the 2024 World Aquatics Championships and medals as a junior, Bukhov has also won bronze in the 50-metre freestyle at the 2024 European Championships and several other medals at the European Junior Championships and European U-23 Championships.

== Early life ==
Vladyslav Serhiyovych Bukhov was born in Donetsk, Ukraine, on 5 July 2002. Bukhov began swimming at seven years old, and in 2014, at 11 years old, Bukhov and his family fled to Kyiv after Russian troops occupied their hometown at the start of the Russo-Ukrainian war. He entered his first swimming competition at 15 years old after being introduced to competitive swimming through modern pentathlon.

== Junior career ==
At the 2019 European Junior Swimming Championships Bukhov finished third in both the 50-metre freestyle and the 100-metre freestyle, and at the 2019 FINA World Junior Swimming Championships later in the year, again competing in the 50-metre freestyle, he led the race from near the beginning to beat the United States' David Curtiss by 0.01 seconds to win gold with a time of 22.13.

In 2020, at the 22nd Luxembourg Euro Meet, he broke the world junior record in the 50-metre butterfly, with a time of 23.14 seconds.

== 2020–2023 ==
Bukhov competed in the 50-metre freestyle event at the 2020 Summer Olympics, where he swam a time of 21.83 in the semifinals to finish 11th overall, not advancing to the final.

At Bukhov's debut World Aquatics Championships, in 2022, he finished tenth in the 50-metre freestyle, being eliminated in the semifinal with a time of 21.87, and a few months later, he reached the final of the 50-metre freestyle at the 2022 European Aquatics Championships, where he registered a time of 22.19 to finish eighth. The following year, at the 2023 World Aquatics Championships, Bukhov again competed in the 50-metre freestyle, where he swam a time of 21.91 in the semifinals to tie with the United States' Ryan Held for the last qualification spot to the final. This meant they competed against each other in a swim-off, where Held won to claim the qualification spot for the final. At the 2023 European U-23 Swimming Championships, Bukhov won bronze in the 50-metre freestyle with a time of 21.96, and he won the skins event, which consisted of a series of elimination races where the winner was the last one standing.

== 2024 World Aquatics Championships ==
At the 2024 World Aquatics Championships, Bukhov won gold in the 50-metre freestyle. Early in the race, Bukhov was last after registering the slowest reaction time, but he overtook the field over the course of the rest of the race to win with a time of 21.44, 0.01 seconds ahead of Australia's defending champion Cameron McEvoy. The Guardian called Bukhov's win "one of the shocks of the championships". It was the first time a Ukrainian had ever won the event and Ukraine's eighth ever gold medal at the World Championships.

He commented after the race that the Russo-Ukrainian war made it hard to train, with civil defense sirens interrupting daily activities, including training. He said after the race: "We train while Russian rockets are flying around swimming pools or other training buildings. So you never know still if you are alive or not." He also commented that Russian athletes should "absolutely not" be allowed to compete at the upcoming 2024 Summer Olympics. Bukhov also broke his country's national record, which had stood since 2016, in the semifinals of the event, with a time of 21.38. That swim made him the 17th fastest performer of all time in the 50-metre freestyle.

== 2024–present ==
Bukhov won bronze at the 2024 European Aquatics Championships, with a time of 21.85 in the 50-metre freestyle, behind Greeks Kristian Gkolomeev and Stergios Bilas. At the same meet, he also competed in the 50-metre butterfly, where he tied for fifth with a time of 23.32.

At the 2024 Summer Olympics, while ill, Bukhov again competed in the 50-metre freestyle, where he again finished 11th with a time of 21.76. Bukhov won the 50-metre freestyle event at the 2025 Luxembourg Euro Meet.

At the 2025 World Championships, Bukhov finished 13th in the 50-metre freestyle with a time of 21.82 in the semifinals, which was not fast enough to qualify for the final. He also competed in the 100-metre freestyle, where he finished 47th with a time of 50.43, which did not qualify him for the semifinals. Bukhov won silver in both the 50-metre freestyle and 50-metre butterfly events at the 2025 European U-23 Swimming Championships, clocking times of 21.74 and 23.09, respectively. In both events, he finished behind Portugal's Diogo Ribeiro.

== Technique ==
Bukhov specialises in the 50-metre freestyle event and does not do many underwater dolphin kicks during his start. Sam Blacker from SwimSwam wrote that this makes him a "feast-or-famine racer", as the lack of dolphin kicks gives him a smaller margin of error when transitioning into front crawl during the breakout.
