= Democratic Republic of the Congo at the 2011 World Aquatics Championships =

Democratic Republic of the Congo at the 2009 World Aquatics Championships
- Flag of the Democratic Republic of the Congo
- FINA code: COD
- National federation: Federation de Natation en Republique Democratique de Congo

in Shanghai, China
- Competitors: 3 in 1 sports
- Medals: Gold 0 Silver 0 Bronze 0 Total 0

World Aquatics Championships appearances
- 2013; 2015–2019; 2022; 2023; 2024

Democratic Republic of the Congo competed at the 2009 World Aquatics Championships in Shanghai, China, July 16–31, 2011.

== Swimming ==
Congo DR qualified 3 swimmers.

Men

Athlete	Event	Heats		Semifinals		Final	
Athlete	Event	Time	Rank	Time	Rank	Time	Rank
Yau Mutas	Men's 50m Freestyle	DNS		did not advance			

Women

Athlete	Event	Heats		Semifinals		Final	
Athlete	Event	Time	Rank	Time	Rank	Time	Rank
Maihi Asono-Nathalie	Women's 50m Freestyle	DNS		did not advance			
Nganga-Ngbo Tania	Women's 50m Freestyle	DNS		did not advance			
