= Swimming at the 2022 European Aquatics Championships – Men's 50 metre freestyle =

Men's 50 metre freestyle at the 2022 European Aquatics Championships
- Venue: Foro Italico
- Dates: 16 August (heats and semifinals); 17 August (final)
- Competitors: 74 from 35 nations
- Winning time: 21.58

Medalists
gold medal	Ben Proud	Great Britain
silver medal	Leonardo Deplano	Italy
bronze medal	Kristian Gkolomeev	Greece

The Men's 50 metre freestyle competition of the 2022 European Aquatics Championships was held on 16 and 17 August 2022.

== Records ==
Prior to the competition, the existing world, European and championship records were as follows.

	Name	Nationality	Time	Location	Date
World record	César Cielo	Brazil	20.91	São Paulo	18 December 2009
European record	Frédérick Bousquet	France	20.94	Montpellier	26 April 2009
Championship record	Ben Proud	Great Britain	21.11	Glasgow	8 August 2018

== Results ==
=== Heats ===
The heats were started on 16 August at 09:00.

Rank	Heat	Lane	Name	Nationality	Time	Notes
1	6	4	Thom de Boer	Netherlands	21.59	Q
2	8	4	Ben Proud	Great Britain	21.78	Q
3	8	6	Leonardo Deplano	Italy	21.89	Q
3	8	3	Lorenzo Zazzeri	Italy	21.89	Q
5	6	3	Vladyslav Bukhov	Ukraine	22.02	Q
6	7	5	Kristian Gkolomeev	Greece	22.06	Q
7	7	2	Björn Seeliger	Sweden	22.13	Q
8	7	6	Jesse Puts	Netherlands	22.15	Q
9	6	7	Heiko Gigler	Austria	22.17	Q
10	5	5	Illya Linnyk	Ukraine	22.18	Q
11	8	9	Diogo Ribeiro	Portugal	22.20	Q
12	8	7	Meiron Cheruti	Israel	22.21	Q
13	8	5	Szebasztián Szabó	Hungary	22.22	Q
14	9	8	Andrej Barna	Serbia	22.23	Q
14	7	4	Maxime Grousset	France	22.23	Q
16	7	3	Paweł Juraszek	Poland	22.24	Q
17	7	0	Matej Duša	Slovakia	22.25	NR
18	6	6	Alessandro Miressi	Italy	22.26	
19	7	8	Andriy Govorov	Ukraine	22.38	
19	4	4	Matthew Richards	Great Britain	22.38	
21	7	1	Nicholas Lia	Norway	22.39	
22	8	2	Luca Dotto	Italy	22.41	
23	6	2	Nikola Miljenić	Croatia	22.45	
24	6	1	Kenzo Simons	Netherlands	22.46	
25	4	6	Sergio de Celis	Spain	22.55	
26	4	1	Deniel Nankov	Bulgaria	22.58	
27	3	6	Alex Ahtiainen	Estonia	22.61	
28	7	7	Konrad Czerniak	Poland	22.63	
28	5	7	Rémi Fabiani	Luxembourg	22.63	
28	7	9	Charles Rihoux	France	22.63	
31	5	3	Carles Coll	Spain	22.67	
32	5	4	Thomas Piron	France	22.68	
33	6	9	Odysseus Meladinis	Greece	22.70	
34	6	5	Ari-Pekka Liukkonen	Finland	22.71	
35	4	3	Stergios Bilas	Greece	22.73	
36	6	0	Daniel Zaitsev	Estonia	22.74	
37	5	2	Malthe Lindeblad	Denmark	22.77	
38	3	7	Adi Mešetović	Bosnia and Herzegovina	22.78	
39	8	1	Karol Ostrowski	Poland	22.79	
40	6	8	Frederik Lentz	Denmark	22.83	
41	5	8	Simon Bucher	Austria	22.85	
42	5	6	Nikola Aćin	Serbia	22.86	
43	5	1	Martin Kartavi	Israel	22.87	
44	3	5	Elias Meeus	Belgium	22.88	
45	3	4	Julien Henx	Luxembourg	22.95	
46	5	0	Julien Berol	France	23.00	
47	8	0	Jasper Aerents	Belgium	23.02	
48	4	7	Christos Papadopoulos	Greece	23.05	
49	2	5	Josif Miladinov	Bulgaria	23.07	
50	1	1	Shane Ryan	Ireland	23.08	
51	3	2	Oleksii Khnykin	Ukraine	23.17	
52	4	8	Nikola Bjelajac	Bosnia and Herzegovina	23.20	
53	4	5	Robin Hanson	Sweden	23.24	
54	3	8	Jan Šefl	Czech Republic	23.26	
55	4	2	Juan Segura	Spain	23.27	
55	2	6	Símon Elías Statkevicius	Iceland	23.27	
57	3	1	Artur Barseghyan	Armenia	23.34	
58	3	9	Marcus Holmquist	Sweden	23.37	
59	3	3	Tomas Navikonis	Lithuania	23.38	
60	4	9	Tomas Sungaila	Lithuania	23.45	
61	2	4	Bernat Lomero	Andorra	23.56	
62	5	9	Max McCusker	Ireland	23.58	
63	3	0	Erik Falk	Sweden	23.74	
64	2	3	Markos Iakovidis	Cyprus	23.77	
65	2	7	Raoul Stafrace	Malta	23.81	
66	1	4	Uroš Živanović	Serbia	23.98	
67	2	8	Luka Kukhalashvili	Georgia	24.05	
68	2	0	Rudi Spiteri	Malta	24.11	
69	2	9	Vladimir Mamikonyan	Armenia	24.16	
70	1	5	Matthew Galea	Malta	24.22	
71	1	3	Luka Eradze	Georgia	24.49	
72	1	7	Martin Muja	Kosovo	25.14	
73	1	6	Drini Ujkashej	Albania	26.64	
74	1	2	Ared Ruci	Albania	26.94	
	2	1	Filippos Iakovidis	Cyprus	Did not start	
	2	2	Olli Kokko	Finland	Did not start	
	4	0	Mateusz Chowaniec	Poland	Did not start	

=== Semifinals ===
The semifinals were started on 16 August at 18:24.

Rank	Heat	Lane	Name	Nationality	Time	Notes
1	1	4	Ben Proud	Great Britain	21.40	Q
2	2	4	Thom de Boer	Netherlands	21.72	Q
2	1	5	Lorenzo Zazzeri	Italy	21.72	Q
4	2	5	Leonardo Deplano	Italy	21.73	Q
5	2	8	Maxime Grousset	France	21.75	q
6	1	3	Kristian Gkolomeev	Greece	21.76	q
7	2	3	Vladyslav Bukhov	Ukraine	21.91	q
8	1	8	Paweł Juraszek	Poland	21.92	q
9	1	6	Jesse Puts	Netherlands	22.02	
10	2	6	Björn Seeliger	Sweden	22.04	
11	1	7	Meiron Cheruti	Israel	22.07	
11	2	7	Diogo Ribeiro	Portugal	22.07	NR
13	1	1	Andrej Barna	Serbia	22.09	NR
14	2	1	Szebasztián Szabó	Hungary	22.13	
15	2	2	Heiko Gigler	Austria	22.14	
16	1	2	Illya Linnyk	Ukraine	22.33	

=== Final ===
The final was started on 17 August at 18:00.

Rank	Lane	Name	Nationality	Time	Notes
1st place, gold medalist(s)	4	Ben Proud	Great Britain	21.58	
2nd place, silver medalist(s)	6	Leonardo Deplano	Italy	21.60	
3rd place, bronze medalist(s)	7	Kristian Gkolomeev	Greece	21.75	
4	8	Paweł Juraszek	Poland	21.78	
5	2	Maxime Grousset	France	21.87	
6	5	Thom de Boer	Netherlands	21.90	
6	3	Lorenzo Zazzeri	Italy	21.90	
8	1	Vladyslav Bukhov	Ukraine	22.19	
