= Swimming at the 2024 European Aquatics Championships – Men's 50 metre freestyle =

Men's 50 metre freestyle at the 2024 European Aquatics Championships
- Venue: Sports Centre Milan Gale Muškatirović
- Dates: 22 June (heats and semifinals); 23 June (final)
- Competitors: 74 from 34 nations
- Winning time: 21.72

Medalists
gold medal	Kristian Gkolomeev	Greece
silver medal	Stergios Bilas	Greece
bronze medal	Vladyslav Bukhov	Ukraine

The Men's 50 metre freestyle competition of the 2024 European Aquatics Championships was held on 22 and 23 June 2024.

== Records ==
Prior to the competition, the existing world, European and championship records were as follows.

	Name	Nationality	Time	Location	Date
World record	César Cielo	Brazil	20.91	São Paulo	18 December 2009
European record	Frédérick Bousquet	France	20.94	Montpellier	26 April 2009
Championship record	Ben Proud	Great Britain	21.11	Glasgow	8 August 2018

== Results ==
=== Heats ===
The heats were started on 22 June at 09:30.
Qualification Rules: The 16 fastest from the heats qualify to the semifinals.

Rank	Heat	Lane	Name	Nationality	Time	Notes
1	1	3	Shane Ryan	Ireland	21.82	Q, NR
2	9	5	Kristian Gkolomeev	Greece	21.95	Q
3	4	7	Emre Sakçı	Turkey	22.09	Q
4	7	5	Andrej Barna	Serbia	22.10	Q
5	8	2	Calum Bain	Ireland	22.11	Q
5	9	8	Piotr Ludwiczak	Poland	22.11	Q
7	7	7	Heiko Gigler	Austria	22.12	Q
8	7	3	Martin Kartavi	Israel	22.19	Q
9	7	2	Paweł Juraszek	Poland	22.21	Q
9	7	4	Szebasztián Szabó	Hungary	22.21	Q
11	8	6	Jere Hribar	Croatia	22.22	Q
11	9	4	Vladyslav Bukhov	Ukraine	22.22	Q
11	9	7	Rémi Fabiani	Luxembourg	22.22	Q
14	8	4	Björn Seeliger	Sweden	22.25	Q
15	8	5	Stergios Bilas	Greece	22.26	Q
16	8	7	Matej Duša	Slovakia	22.27	Q
17	5	6	Luka Cvetko	Croatia	22.33	
17	7	8	Jokūbas Keblys	Lithuania	22.33	
19	7	6	Nikola Miljenić	Croatia	22.34	
20	6	6	Daniel Zaitsev	Estonia	22.37	
21	8	8	Mateusz Chowaniec	Poland	22.39	
22	6	8	Nikola Aćin	Serbia	22.42	
23	8	1	Odysseus Meladinis	Greece	22.45	
23	9	2	Kaloyan Bratanov	Bulgaria	22.45	
25	9	9	Bence Szabados	Hungary	22.47	
26	6	5	George-Adrian Ratiu	Romania	22.49	
27	6	7	William Textor-Broch	Denmark	22.50	
28	5	3	Calvin Fry	Great Britain	22.51	
29	7	0	Illya Linnyk	Ukraine	22.53	
30	6	2	Kalle Mäkinen	Finland	22.54	
31	9	0	Elias Persson	Sweden	22.56	
32	7	9	Ralph Daleiden Ciuferri	Luxembourg	22.60	
33	8	3	Artem Selin	Germany	22.61	
34	6	4	Frederik Møller	Denmark	22.67	
35	4	6	Frederik Lentz	Denmark	22.68	
36	5	2	Martin Wrede	Germany	22.71	
37	6	1	Peter Varjasi	Germany	22.74	
38	9	6	Nicholas Lia	Norway	22.75	
39	8	0	Ole-Mats Eidam	Germany	22.79	
40	5	4	Kyle Micallef	Malta	22.80	NR
40	6	3	Alexander Painter	Great Britain	22.80	
42	4	8	Marcus Holmquist	Sweden	22.81	
43	7	1	Ari-Pekka Liukkonen	Finland	22.85	
44	4	4	Adi Mešetović	Bosnia and Herzegovina	22.86	
45	8	9	Tibor Tistan	Slovakia	22.87	
46	4	5	Alex Ahtiainen	Estonia	22.88	
47	5	5	Justin Cvetkov	Serbia	22.90	
47	5	8	Patrick-Sebastian Dinu	Romania	22.90	
49	6	0	Ralf Tribuntsov	Estonia	22.91	
50	4	9	Leon Opatril	Austria	22.92	
51	4	1	Artur Barseghyan	Armenia	22.94	
52	5	7	Julien Henx	Luxembourg	22.95	
53	5	1	Deniel Nankov	Bulgaria	22.97	
54	2	2	Einar Margeir Ágústsson	Iceland	23.09	
54	5	9	Leo Verschooten	Belgium	23.09	
56	4	3	Oliver Søgaard-Andersen	Denmark	23.11	
57	2	6	Valerijs Čurgelis	Latvia	23.15	
58	3	0	Símon Elías Statkevicius	Iceland	23.17	
59	3	9	Lovro Serdarević	Croatia	23.18	
59	4	2	Petar Popović	Serbia	23.18	
61	4	0	Vincent van Hooydonck	Belgium	23.26	
62	3	8	Jan Šefl	Czech Republic	23.36	
63	2	5	Grisi Koxhaku	Albania	23.38	
64	2	4	Tiago Behar	Switzerland	23.48	
65	3	3	Alexandru-Richard Szilagyi	Romania	23.54	
66	5	0	Oisin Tebite	Ireland	23.58	
67	3	5	Alaa Maso	ERT	23.67	
68	2	8	Jovan Jankovski	North Macedonia	23.74	
69	3	2	Alexander Trampitsch	Austria	23.80	
70	2	1	Bartal Erlingsson Eidesgaard	Faroe Islands	23.85	
71	3	1	Mak Nurkić Kačapor	Bosnia and Herzegovina	24.03	
72	2	7	Joao Reisen Braga Soares Carneiro	Luxembourg	24.09	
73	1	4	Paolo Priska	Albania	24.25	
74	1	5	Nikola Trajanovski	North Macedonia	24.27	
	2	3	Bernat Lomero	Andorra	DNS	
	3	4	Lukas Edl	Austria	DNS	
	3	7	Daniel Gracík	Czech Republic	DNS	
	6	9	Isak Eliasson	Sweden	DNS	
	9	1	Konrad Czerniak	Poland	DNS	
	9	3	Kristóf Milák	Hungary	DNS	

=== Swim-off ===
The swim-off was held on 22 June at 10:40.
Qualification Rules: The best time advance to reserve.

Rank	Lane	Name	Nationality	Time	Notes
1	5	Jokūbas Keblys	Lithuania	22.17	R
2	4	Luka Cvetko	Croatia	22.32	

=== Semifinals ===
The semifinals were started on 22 June at 19:12.
Qualification Rules: The first 2 competitors of each semifinal and the remaining fastest (up to a total of 8 qualified competitors) from the semifinals advance to the final.

Rank	Heat	Lane	Name	Nationality	Time	Notes
1	1	4	Kristian Gkolomeev	Greece	21.73	Q
2	1	5	Andrej Barna	Serbia	21.92	Q
3	1	7	Vladyslav Bukhov	Ukraine	21.94	Q
4	2	4	Shane Ryan	Ireland	21.96	Q
5	1	2	Szebasztián Szabó	Hungary	22.03	Q
5	2	7	Jere Hribar	Croatia	22.03	Q
7	1	3	Piotr Ludwiczak	Poland	22.08	Q
8	2	8	Stergios Bilas	Greece	22.10	Q
9	2	3	Calum Bain	Ireland	22.12	
10	2	1	Rémi Fabiani	Luxembourg	22.14	
11	2	2	Paweł Juraszek	Poland	22.16	
12	1	6	Martin Kartavi	Israel	22.19	
12	2	5	Emre Sakçı	Turkey	22.19	
14	2	6	Heiko Gigler	Austria	22.24	
15	1	1	Björn Seeliger	Sweden	22.30	
16	1	8	Matej Duša	Slovakia	22.33	

=== Final ===
The final was started on 23 June at 18:30.

Rank	Lane	Name	Nationality	Time	Notes
1st place, gold medalist(s)	4	Kristian Gkolomeev	Greece	21.72	
2nd place, silver medalist(s)	8	Stergios Bilas	Greece	21.73	
3rd place, bronze medalist(s)	3	Vladyslav Bukhov	Ukraine	21.85	
4	1	Piotr Ludwiczak	Poland	21.90	
5	5	Andrej Barna	Serbia	21.93	
6	7	Jere Hribar	Croatia	21.99	
7	2	Szebasztián Szabó	Hungary	22.09	
8	6	Shane Ryan	Ireland	22.17	
