= Swimming at the 2024 European Aquatics Championships – Men's 50 metre butterfly =

Men's 50 metre butterfly at the 2024 European Aquatics Championships
- Venue: Sports Centre Milan Gale Muškatirović
- Dates: 17 June (heats and semifinals); 18 June (final)
- Competitors: 58 from 30 nations
- Winning time: 23.15

Medalists
gold medal	Stergios Marios	Greece
silver medal	Simon Bucher	Austria
bronze medal	Daniel Gracík	Czech Republic

The Men's 50 metre butterfly competition of the 2024 European Aquatics Championships was held on 17 and 18 June 2024.

== Records ==
Prior to the competition, the existing world, European and championship records were as follows.

	Name	Nation	Time	Location	Date
World record European record	Andriy Govorov	Ukraine	22.27	Rome	1 July 2018
Championship record	Andriy Govorov	Ukraine	22.48	Glasgow	7 August 2018

== Results ==
=== Heats ===
The heats were started on 17 June at 09:55.
Qualification Rules: The 16 fastest from the heats qualify to the semifinals.

Rank	Heat	Lane	Name	Nationality	Time	Notes
1	4	5	Vladyslav Bukhov	Ukraine	23.33	Q
2	5	4	Meiron Cheruti	Israel	23.37	Q
3	5	5	Stergios Marios	Greece	23.42	Q
4	6	5	Simon Bucher	Austria	23.43	Q
5	6	3	Daniel Gracík	Czech Republic	23.45	Q
6	6	4	Szebasztián Szabó	Hungary	23.49	Q
7	1	8	Hubert Kós	Hungary	23.51	Q
8	4	4	Luca Nik Armbruster	Germany	23.53	Q
8	5	6	Jakub Majerski	Poland	23.53	Q
10	6	2	Jan Šefl	Czech Republic	23.59	Q
11	6	8	Đurđe Matić	Serbia	23.61	Q
12	4	3	Hubert Kós	Hungary	23.63	
13	4	2	Casper Puggaard	Denmark	23.66	Q
14	4	6	Daniel Zaitsev	Estonia	23.70	Q
15	5	9	Max McCusker	Ireland	23.72	Q
16	6	6	Nikola Miljenić	Croatia	23.73	Q
17	4	7	Denis-Laurean Popescu	Romania	23.79	Swim-Off > Q
17	5	7	Tibor Tistan	Slovakia	23.79	Swim-Off
19	1	0	Kalle Makinen	Finland	23.81	
20	6	7	Oskar Hoff	Sweden	23.85	
21	3	5	Oliver Søgaard-Andersen	Denmark	23.87	
21	5	2	Arsenii Kovalov	Ukraine	23.87	
23	3	9	Bjorn Kammann	Germany	23.88	
24	4	9	Paweł Korzeniowski	Poland	23.95	
24	6	9	Albin Lovgren	Sweden	23.95	
26	4	0	Lukas Edl	Austria	23.96	
26	6	1	Rasmus Nickelsen	Denmark	23.96	
28	6	0	Anastasios Kougkoulos	Greece	23.97	
29	4	8	Adrian Jaśkiewicz	Poland	24.05	
29	5	0	Martin Kartavi	Israel	24.05	
31	4	1	Julien Henx	Luxembourg	24.06	
32	3	6	Artem Selin	Germany	24.17	
33	3	4	Frederik Møller	Denmark	24.19	
34	5	1	George-Adrian Ratiu	Romania	24.20	
35	3	3	Alex Ahtiainen	Estonia	24.21	
36	5	3	Konrad Czerniak	Poland	24.29	
37	2	6	Sebastian Lunak	Czech Republic	24.33	
37	3	7	Linus Kahl	Sweden	24.33	
39	3	2	Miloš Milenković	Montenegro	24.41	
40	2	3	Artur Barseghyan	Armenia	24.48	
41	2	5	Alexandru-Richard Szilagyi	Romania	24.61	
42	1	1	Mihai Gergely	Romania	24.63	
43	3	8	Simon Elias Statkevicius	Iceland	24.64	
44	2	7	Luka Jovanović	Serbia	24.69	
45	2	9	Kenan Dracic	Bosnia and Herzegovina	24.77	
46	2	1	Dino Hasibović Sirotanović	Bosnia and Herzegovina	24.78	
46	3	1	Noah Verreth	Belgium	24.78	
48	1	2	Grisi Koxhaku	Albania	24.92	
49	1	4	Luka Cvetko	Croatia	24.93	
50	2	2	Nemanja Maksic	Serbia	24.94	
50	2	4	Tomàs Lomero Arenas	Andorra	24.94	
52	1	3	Petar Popović	Serbia	25.19	
53	3	0	Ari-Pekka Liukkonen	Finland	25.20	
54	2	8	Ramil Valizade	Azerbaijan	25.25	
55	1	6	Ronens Kermans	Latvia	25.26	
56	2	0	Kyle Micallef	Malta	25.31	
57	1	5	Polat Uzer Turnalı	Turkey	25.41	
58	1	7	Nikola Trajanovski	North Macedonia	26.38	
	5	8	Joshua Gammon	Great Britain	Did not start	

=== Swim-off ===
The swim-off was held on 17 June at 11:25.
Qualification Rules: The best time advance to the semifinals.

Rank	Lane	Name	Nationality	Time	Notes
1	4	Denis-Laurean Popescu	Romania	23.48	Q, NR
2	5	Tibor Tistan	Slovakia	23.76	

=== Semifinals ===
The semifinals were started on 17 June at 18:30.
Qualification Rules: The first 2 competitors of each semifinal and the remaining fastest (up to a total of 8 qualified competitors) from the semifinals advance to the final.

Rank	Heat	Lane	Name	Nationality	Time	Notes
1	2	5	Stergios Marios	Greece	23.06	Q, NR
2	1	4	Meiron Cheruti	Israel	23.20	Q
3	1	3	Szebasztián Szabó	Hungary	23.23	Q
4	1	5	Simon Bucher	Austria	23.29	Q
4	2	4	Vladyslav Bukhov	Ukraine	23.29	Q
6	2	3	Daniel Gracík	Czech Republic	23.31	Q
7	2	8	Nikola Miljenić	Croatia	23.34	Q
8	1	8	Denis-Laurean Popescu	Romania	23.45	Q, NR
9	1	7	Casper Puggaard	Denmark	23.48	
10	1	6	Luca Nik Armbruster	Germany	23.53	
11	2	1	Daniel Zaitsev	Estonia	23.59	
11	2	2	Jakub Majerski	Poland	23.59	
13	2	7	Đurđe Matić	Serbia	23.60	
14	1	2	Jan Šefl	Czech Republic	23.61	
15	1	1	Max McCusker	Ireland	23.75	
16	2	6	Hubert Kós	Hungary	23.79	

=== Final ===
The final was held on 18 June at 18:07.

Rank	Lane	Name	Nationality	Time	Notes
1st place, gold medalist(s)	4	Stergios Marios	Greece	23.15	
2nd place, silver medalist(s)	6	Simon Bucher	Austria	23.19	
3rd place, bronze medalist(s)	7	Daniel Gracík	Czech Republic	23.26	
4	5	Meiron Cheruti	Israel	23.28	
5	2	Vladyslav Bukhov	Ukraine	23.32	
5	3	Szebasztián Szabó	Hungary	23.32	
7	8	Denis-Laurean Popescu	Romania	23.43	NR
8	1	Nikola Miljenić	Croatia	23.71	
