= Mauritania at the 2025 World Aquatics Championships =

- Flag of Mauritania
- World Aquatics code: MTN
- National federation: Mauritanian Swimming Federation

in Singapore
- Competitors: 1 in 1 sport
- Medals: Gold 0 Silver 0 Bronze 0 Total 0

World Aquatics Championships appearances
- 1973; 1975; 1978; 1982; 1986; 1991; 1994; 1998; 2001; 2003; 2005; 2007; 2009; 2011; 2013–2023; 2024; 2025

Mauritania competed at the 2025 World Aquatics Championships in Singapore from 11 July to 3 August 2025.

== Competitors ==
The following is the list of competitors in the Championships.

| Sport | Men | Women | Total |
|---|---|---|---|
| Swimming | 1 | 0 | 1 |
| Total | 1 | 0 | 1 |

== Swimming ==
Men

| Athlete | Event | Heat | | Semifinal | | Final | |
| Athlete | Event | Time | Rank | Time | Rank | Time | Rank |
|---|---|---|---|---|---|---|---|
| Camil Doua | 50 m freestyle | 25.76 | 92 | Did not advance | | | |
