= Eritrea at the 2025 World Aquatics Championships =

- Flag of Eritrea
- World Aquatics code: ERI
- National federation: Eritrean National Swimming Association

in Singapore
- Competitors: 2 in 1 sport
- Medals: Gold 0 Silver 0 Bronze 0 Total 0

World Aquatics Championships appearances
- 2019; 2022–2023; 2024; 2025

Eritrea is competing at the 2025 World Aquatics Championships in Singapore from 11 July to 3 August 2025.

== Competitors ==
The following is the list of competitors in the Championships.

Sport	Men	Women	Total
Swimming	1	1	2
Total	1	1	2

== Swimming ==
Men

Athlete	Event	Heat		Semifinal		Final	
Athlete	Event	Time	Rank	Time	Rank	Time	Rank
Aaron Ghebre Owusu	50 m freestyle	24.17	73	Did not advance			
Aaron Ghebre Owusu	50 m butterfly	25.76	72	Did not advance			

Women

Athlete	Event	Heat		Semifinal		Final	
Athlete	Event	Time	Rank	Time	Rank	Time	Rank
Hearmela Neguse Melke	50 m freestyle	31.33	91	Did not advance			
