= Turks and Caicos Islands at the 2025 World Aquatics Championships =

- Flag of the Turks and Caicos Islands
- World Aquatics code: TCA
- National federation: Turks & Caicos Islands Swim Federation

in Singapore
- Competitors: 2 in 1 sport
- Medals: Gold 0 Silver 0 Bronze 0 Total 0

World Aquatics Championships appearances
- 2022; 2023; 2024; 2025

Turks and Caicos Islands competed at the 2025 World Aquatics Championships in Singapore from July 11 to August 3, 2025.

== Competitors ==
The following is the list of competitors in the Championships.

Sport	Men	Women	Total
Swimming	1	1	2
Total	1	1	2

== Swimming ==
Turks and Caicos Islands entered 2 swimmers.

Men

Athlete	Event	Heat		Semi-final		Final	
Athlete	Event	Time	Rank	Time	Rank	Time	Rank
Ethan Gardiner	50 m freestyle	25.56	90	Did not advance			
Ethan Gardiner	50 m breaststroke	33.63	75	Did not advance			

Women

Athlete	Event	Heat		Semi-final		Final	
Athlete	Event	Time	Rank	Time	Rank	Time	Rank
Arleigha Hall	50 m freestyle	29.42	79	Did not advance			
Arleigha Hall	50 m butterfly	32.38	74	Did not advance			
