= Swimming at the 2024 World Aquatics Championships – Men's 50 metre freestyle =

Men's 50 metre freestyle at the Swimming at the 2024 World Aquatics Championships
- Venue: Aspire Dome
- Location: Doha, Qatar
- Dates: 16 February (heats and semifinal); 17 February (final)
- Competitors: 117 from 111 nations
- Winning time: 21.44

Medalists
gold medal	Vladyslav Bukhov	Ukraine
silver medal	Cameron McEvoy	Australia
bronze medal	Ben Proud	Great Britain

The men's 50 metre freestyle competition at the 2024 World Aquatics Championships was held on 16 and 17 February 2024.

== Background ==
Australia's Cameron McEvoy was the defending champion and favourite for the event, followed by Great Britain's Ben Proud. SwimSwam wrote that they were the "two clear-and-away front-runners in this race", predicting that McEvoy would win gold, Proud would win silver, and Michael Andrew of the United States would win bronze. Also in contention for medals were Isaac Cooper of Australia, Ukraine's Vladyslav Bukhov, Greeks Kristian Gkolomeev and Stergios Bilas, and Italian Leonardo Deplano.

== Qualification ==
Each National Federation was permitted to enter a maximum of two qualified athletes in each individual event, but only if both of them had attained the "A" standard qualification time at approved qualifying events. For this event, the "A" standard qualification time was 22.12 seconds. Federations could enter one athlete into the event if they met the "B" standard qualification time. For this event, the "B" standard qualification time was 22.89. Athletes could also enter the event if they had met an "A" or "B" standard in a different event and their Federation had not entered anyone else. Additional considerations applied to Federations who had few swimmers enter through the standard qualification times. Federations in this category could at least enter two men and two women into the competition, all of whom could enter into up to two events.

Top 10 fastest qualification times (Note: Only including swimmers who were on the start list for this event)
Swimmer	Country	Time	Competition
Cameron McEvoy	Australia	21.06	2023 World Aquatics Championships
Ben Proud	Great Britain	21.58	2023 World Aquatics Championships
Michael Andrew	United States	21.64	2023 USA Swimming Championships
Isaac Cooper	Australia	21.65	2023 World Aquatics Championships
Szebasztian Szabó	Hungary	21.67	2023 World Aquatics Championships
Dylan Carter	Trinidad and Tobago	21.69	ASATT Championship 2023
Vladyslav Bukhov	Ukraine	21.70	2023 World Aquatics Championships
Ji Yu-chan	South Korea	21.72	2022 Asian Games
Leonardo Deplano	Italy	21.74	2023 World Aquatics Championships
Matt King	United States	21.80	2023 USA Swimming Championships

== Heats ==
The heats were held on 16 February at 10:08.

Results
Rank	Heat	Lane	Name	Nationality	Time	Notes
1	12	4	Cameron McEvoy	Australia	21.13	Q
2	10	5	Vladyslav Bukhov	Ukraine	21.56	Q
3	11	6	Kristian Gkolomeev	Greece	21.70	Q
4	10	4	Michael Andrew	United States	21.78	Q
5	12	2	Ian Yentou Ho	Hong Kong	21.83	Q
6	11	1	Lorenzo Zazzeri	Italy	21.85	Q
7	12	5	Isaac Cooper	Australia	21.86	Q
8	11	4	Benjamin Proud	Great Britain	21.88	Q
9	12	6	Kenzo Simons	Netherlands	21.89	Q
10	12	3	Ji Yu-chan	South Korea	21.93	Q
11	10	2	Dylan Carter	Trinidad and Tobago	21.95	Q
12	11	3	Leonardo Deplano	Italy	21.98	Q
13	11	9	Bjoern Seeliger	Sweden	21.99	Q
14	10	3	Matt King	United States	22.03	Q
15	9	1	Andrej Barna	Serbia	22.05	Q
16	9	6	Matej Duša	Slovakia	22.12	Q, NR
17	12	0	Thom de Boer	Netherlands	22.13	
18	11	2	Diogo Ribeiro	Portugal	22.14	
19	12	1	Nicholas Lia	Norway	22.19	
20	9	4	Pawel Juraszek	Poland	22.20	
20	10	8	Nikola Miljenic	Croatia	22.20	
22	10	7	Mikel Schreuders	Aruba	22.22	
22	11	8	Shinri Shioura	Japan	22.22	
24	10	1	Thomas Fannon	Ireland	22.23	
24	10	6	Stergios Marios Bilas	Greece	22.23	
26	11	7	Miguel Nascimento	Portugal	22.25	
27	11	0	Alberto Mestre	Venezuela	22.26	
28	12	7	Jonathan Tan	Singapore	22.27	
29	9	7	Heiko Gigler	Austria	22.28	
30	11	5	Szebasztian Szabo	Hungary	22.32	
31	8	6	Clayton Jimmie	South Africa	22.33	
32	9	5	Lamar Taylor	Bahamas	22.41	
33	9	2	Kaloyan Bratanov	Bulgaria	22.48	
33	12	8	Andrii Govorov	Ukraine	22.48	
35	10	9	Remi Fabiani	Luxembourg	22.55	
36	9	9	Oussama Sahnoune	Algeria	22.76	
37	9	8	Kalle Aleksanteri Makinen	Finland	22.81	
38	9	3	Cameron Gray	New Zealand	22.84	
39	9	0	Javier Núñez	Dominican Republic	22.95	
40	8	3	Samyar Abdoli	Iran	22.98	
41	8	0	Diego Aranda	Uruguay	23.06	
42	10	0	Emre Sakci	Turkey	23.11	
43	8	4	Adi Mesetovic	Bosnia and Herzegovina	23.12	
44	8	5	Stephen Calkins	Canada	23.15	
45	8	8	Hansel Mccaig	Fiji	23.30	
46	7	0	Grisi Koxhaku	Albania	23.41	
47	5	4	Yousuf Almatrooshi	United Arab Emirates	23.44	
48	1	3	Kyle Abeysinghe	Sri Lanka	23.45	
48	7	5	Emad Addin Zapen	Jordan	23.45	
50	7	6	Bernat Lomero	Andorra	23.47	
51	8	7	Stefano Mitchell	Antigua and Barbuda	23.48	
52	8	1	Jeancarlo Calderon	Panama	23.52	
53	7	3	Tendo Mukalazi	Uganda	23.63	
54	7	7	Tristan Dorville	Saint Lucia	23.70	
55	8	2	Alaa Maso	Athlete Refugee Team	23.73	
56	8	9	Johann Stickland	Samoa	23.75	
57	5	3	Steven Aimable	Senegal	23.77	
58	6	4	Alexander Shah	Nepal	23.79	
59	7	4	Colins Obi Ebingha	Nigeria	23.80	
60	6	3	Jose Quintanilla	Bolivia	23.87	
61	7	2	Micah Masei	American Samoa	24.00	
62	6	5	Nixon Hernandez	El Salvador	24.01	
63	7	1	Musa Zhalayev	Turkmenistan	24.10	
64	6	6	Antoine De Lapparent	Cambodia	24.14	
65	7	8	Irvin Hoost	Suriname	24.23	
66	6	9	Mohamad Zubaid	Kuwait	24.25	
67	5	5	Adam Moncherry	Seychelles	24.27	
67	7	9	Sidrell Williams	Jamaica	24.27	
69	6	10	Belly-Cresus Ganira	Burundi	24.32	
70	6	2	Filipe Gomes	Malawi	24.34	
71	6	1	Ovesh Purahoo	Mauritius	24.35	
72	6	7	Damien Shamambo	Zambia	24.50	
73	6	8	Issa Samir Hamed Al	Oman	24.60	
74	5	6	SMH Tariq	Pakistan	24.62	
75	5	2	Josh Tarere	Papua New Guinea	24.64	
76	2	9	Alexien Kouma	Mali	24.77	
77	1	0	Jefferson Kpanou	Benin	24.83	
78	5	1	Alan Koti Lopeti Uhi	Tonga	24.85	
79	5	7	Yousef Al-khulaifi	Qatar	25.04	
80	5	8	Cedrick Niyibizi	Rwanda	25.12	
81	2	8	Brandon George	Saint Vincent and the Grenadines	25.31	
82	5	0	Tajhari Williams	Turks and Caicos Islands	25.35	
83	1	4	Samiul Islam Rafi	Bangladesh	25.47	
84	1	5	Aaron Ghebre Owusu	Eritrea	25.66	
85	5	9	Haziq Samil	Brunei	25.72	
86	4	4	Katerson Moya	Federated States of Micronesia	25.80	
86	4	7	Houmed Houssein Barkat	Djibouti	25.80	NR
88	4	5	Travis Dui Sakurai	Palau	25.83	
89	2	5	Camil Doua	Mauritania	25.93	
90	4	2	Michael Mponezya Joseph	Tanzania	25.94	
91	4	3	Fakhriddin Madkamov	Tajikistan	26.38	
92	4	6	Slava Sihanouvong	Laos	26.48	
93	4	8	Souleymane Napare	Burkina Faso	26.51	
94	4	1	Kinley Lhendup	Bhutan	26.62	
95	2	6	Troy Nestor Pina	Cape Verde	26.88	
96	3	1	Christian Nii Nortey	Ghana	27.16	
97	1	8	Charles Levi Avi	Ivory Coast	27.21	
98	3	2	AAA Khousrof	Yemen	27.32	
99	3	7	Ousman Jobe	Gambia	27.34	
100	4	0	Edgar Richardson Iro	Solomon Islands	27.35	
101	3	5	Joshua Wyse	Sierra Leone	27.37	
102	2	2	Fode Amara Camara	Guinea	27.44	
103	3	6	Magnim Jordano Daou	Togo	27.49	
104	4	9	Phillip Kinono	Marshall Islands	27.62	
105	2	0	Charly Ndjoume	Cameroon	27.69	
106	3	4	Johnathan Silas	Vanuatu	27.74	
107	2	3	Yann Emmanuel Douma	Republic of the Congo	27.87	
108	1	6	Aristote Ndombe	Democratic Republic of the Congo	27.88	
109	1	2	Bereket Demissie Girkebo	Ethiopia	28.17	
110	3	3	Adam Mpali	Gabon	28.61	
111	2	1	Troy Nisbett	Saint Kitts and Nevis	29.23	
112	3	9	Refiloe Chopho	Lesotho	29.56	
113	3	8	Jolanio Guterres	Timor-Leste	30.06	
114	1	1	Ibrahim Mohamed	Comoros	30.43	
115	3	0	Pedro Rogery	Guinea-Bissau	30.63	
116	2	4	Terence Tengue	Central African Republic	31.69	
	1	7	Higinio Ndong	Equatorial Guinea	Did not start	
	12	9	Pan Zhanle	China	Did not start	
	2	7	AB Mamane	Niger	Disqualified	

== Semifinals ==
The semifinals were held on 16 February at 19:40.

Results
Rank	Heat	Lane	Name	Nationality	Time	Notes
1	2	4	Cameron McEvoy	Australia	21.23	Q
2	1	4	Vladyslav Bukhov	Ukraine	21.38	Q, NR
3	1	6	Ben Proud	Great Britain	21.54	Q
4	2	1	Björn Seeliger	Sweden	21.67	Q
5	2	5	Kristian Gkolomeev	Greece	21.72	Q
6	2	2	Kenzo Simons	Netherlands	21.73	Q
7	2	6	Isaac Cooper	Australia	21.74	Q
8	1	5	Michael Andrew	United States	21.77	Q
9	1	3	Lorenzo Zazzeri	Italy	21.80	
10	1	7	Leonardo Deplano	Italy	21.81	
11	2	3	Ian Ho	Hong Kong	21.84	
12	1	2	Ji Yu-chan	South Korea	21.87	
13	2	8	Andrej Barna	Serbia	21.89	NR
14	1	1	Matt King	United States	21.99	
15	2	7	Dylan Carter	Trinidad and Tobago	22.01	
16	1	8	Matej Duša	Slovakia	22.11	NR

== Final ==
The final was held on 17 February at 19:09.

Results
Rank	Lane	Name	Nationality	Time
1st place, gold medalist(s)	5	Vladyslav Bukhov	Ukraine	21.44
2nd place, silver medalist(s)	4	Cameron McEvoy	Australia	21.45
3rd place, bronze medalist(s)	3	Ben Proud	Great Britain	21.53
4	8	Michael Andrew	United States	21.71
5	1	Isaac Cooper	Australia	21.77
6	7	Kenzo Simons	Netherlands	21.81
7	6	Björn Seeliger	Sweden	21.83
8	2	Kristian Gkolomeev	Greece	21.84

== Sources ==
- "Competition Regulations" (PDF). World Aquatics. Archived (PDF) from the original on 15 February 2026.
