= Swimming at the 2024 Summer Olympics – Men's 50-metre freestyle =

Men's 50-metre freestyle at the Games of the XXXIII Olympiad
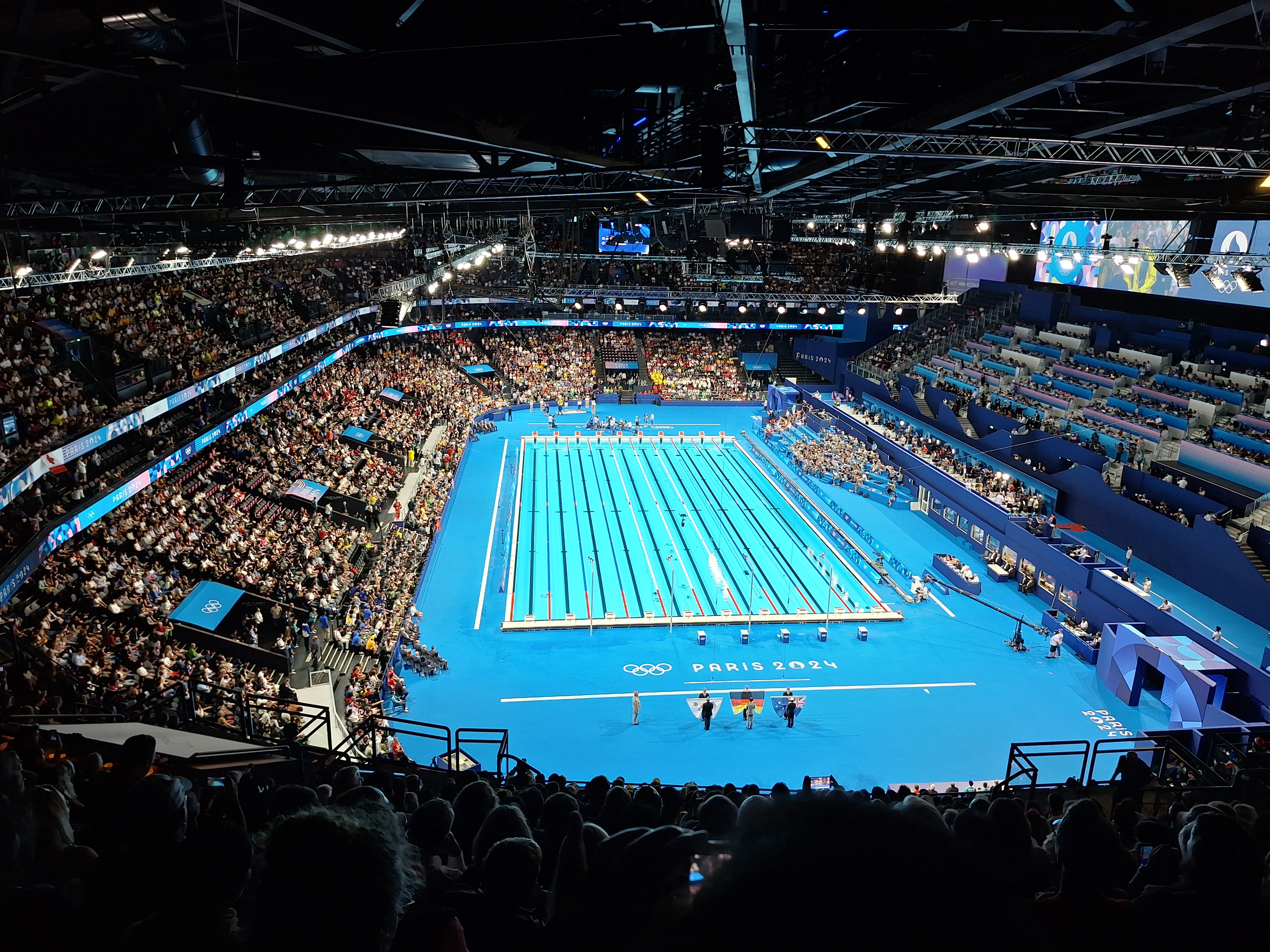
- Paris La Défense Arena after it was converted to a swimming pool for the swimming events
- Venue: Paris La Défense Arena
- Dates: 1 August 2024 (heats and semifinals); 2 August 2024 (final)
- Competitors: 74 from 65 nations
- Winning time: 21.25 seconds

Medalists
1st place, gold medalist(s)		Cameron McEvoy	Australia
2nd place, silver medalist(s)		Ben Proud	Great Britain
3rd place, bronze medalist(s)		Florent Manaudou	France

The men's 50-metre freestyle event at the 2024 Summer Olympics was held from 1 to 2 August 2024 at Paris La Défense Arena, which was converted to a swimming pool for the swimming events.

Going into the competition, Australia's Cameron McEvoy was the favourite, while defending Olympic champion Caeleb Dressel of the US and Ben Proud of Great Britain were also among the top contenders. In the final, McEvoy won gold, followed by Proud with silver and Florent Manaudou of France winning bronze. Manaudou's podium finish made him the first swimmer ever to win four consecutive Olympic medals in the event.

== Background ==
Although Caeleb Dressel of the United States was the defending champion in the event, he had missed a period of competition from 2022 to 2023. During this time, Great Britain's Ben Proud and Australia's Cameron McEvoy won the event at the 2022 and 2023 World Championships, respectively. Florent Manaudou of France had featured on the podium at the last three Olympics in the event, and according to SwimSwam, was in good form going into the event. Swimswam and Swimming World opined that McEvoy was most likely to win gold.

Prior to the event, the world record was 20.91, set by César Cielo of Brazil in 2009, and the Olympic record was 21.07, set by the Dressel at the 2020 games.

The event was held at Paris La Défense Arena, which was converted to a swimming pool for the swimming events.

== Qualification ==
Each National Olympic Committee (NOC) was permitted to enter a maximum of two qualified athletes in each individual event, but only if both of them had attained the Olympic Qualifying Time (OQT). For this event, the OQT was 21.96 seconds. World Aquatics then filled the rest of the event places with athletes qualifying through universality; NOCs were given one event entry for each gender, which could be used by any athlete regardless of qualification time, providing the spaces had not already been taken by athletes from that nation who had achieved the OQT. In total, 40 athletes qualified through achieving the OQT, while 35 athletes qualified through universality places.

Shane Ryan of Ireland achieved the OQT at the 2024 European Aquatics Championships but was not able to start as it was not one of Swim Ireland's designated Olympic qualifying events. China's Pan Zhanle qualified but dropped the event.

Top 10 fastest qualification times
Swimmer	Country	Time	Competition
Cameron McEvoy	Australia	21.06	2023 World Aquatics Championships
Ben Proud	Great Britain	21.25	2024 Aquatics GB Swimming Championships
Vladyslav Bukhov	Ukraine	21.38	2024 World Aquatics Championships
Caeleb Dressel	United States	21.41	2024 United States Olympic Trials
Joshua Liendo	Canada	21.48	2024 Canadian Olympic Trials
Florent Manaudou	France	21.52	2024 French Elite Championships
Chris Guiliano	United States	21.59	2024 United States Olympic Trials
Maxime Grousset	France	21.66	2024 French Elite Championships
Björn Seeliger	Sweden	21.67	2024 World Aquatics Championships
Szebasztián Szabó	Hungary	21.67	2023 World Aquatics Championships

== Heats ==
Ten heats took place on 1 August 2024, starting at 11:18. (Note: All times are Central European Summer Time (UTC+2)) The swimmers with the best 16 times in the heats advanced to the semifinals. McEvoy swam 21.32 seconds to claim the fastest swim of the heats, while Caymanian Jordan Crooks finished in 21.51 to claim second, and Manaudou swam the third fastest time of 21.54.

Thomas Fannon of Ireland claimed a new national record of 21.79 seconds, which bettered Ryan's mark set a month earlier at the European Championships by 0.03 seconds. Crooks also set a national record, beating his own time by 0.22 seconds. David Young set Fiji's national record at 22.71, beating his previous national record of 22.87, Alex Joachim set Saint Vincent and the Grenadines' national record at 23.59, and Mohamed Aan Hussain set the Maldives' national record at 24.22.

Results
Rank	Heat	Lane	Swimmer	Nation	Time	Notes
1	10	4	Cameron McEvoy	Australia	21.32	Q
2	10	7	Jordan Crooks	Cayman Islands	21.51	Q, NR
3	8	5	Florent Manaudou	France	21.54	Q
4	10	1	Lorenzo Zazzeri	Italy	21.64	Q
5	9	4	Ben Proud	Great Britain	21.70	Q
6	6	7	Tom Fannon	Ireland	21.79	Q, NR
6	8	7	Leonardo Deplano	Italy	21.79	Q
8	9	8	Ben Armbruster	Australia	21.86	Q
8	10	2	Kristian Gkolomeev	Greece	21.86	Q
10	8	8	Meiron Cheruti	Israel	21.88	Q
11	8	4	Vladyslav Bukhov	Ukraine	21.89	Q
11	10	6	Gabriel Castaño	Mexico	21.89	Q
13	7	5	Diogo Ribeiro	Portugal	21.91	Q
13	10	5	Caeleb Dressel	United States	21.91	Q
15	9	5	Josh Liendo	Canada	21.92	Q
16	9	3	Maxime Grousset	France	21.94	Q
17	10	3	Chris Guiliano	United States	21.97	
18	9	7	Stergios Bilas	Greece	22.00	
19	7	1	Martin Kartavi	Israel	22.01	
19	7	4	Taiko Torepe-Ormsby	New Zealand	22.01	
21	9	1	Alberto Mestre	Venezuela	22.02	
22	6	2	Jere Hribar	Croatia	22.08	
23	7	3	Renzo Tjon-A-Joe	Netherlands	22.10	
24	9	6	Szebasztián Szabó	Hungary	22.12	
24	10	8	Ian Ho	Hong Kong	22.12	
26	6	6	Mikel Schreuders	Aruba	22.14	
27	8	2	Kenzo Simons	Netherlands	22.15	
28	9	2	Ji Yu-chan	South Korea	22.16	
29	8	6	Dylan Carter	Trinidad and Tobago	22.18	
30	7	2	Andrej Barna	Serbia	22.19	
31	8	3	Björn Seeliger	Sweden	22.21	
32	6	5	Jonathan Tan	Singapore	22.26	
33	6	4	Alexander Cohoon	Great Britain	22.31	
33	7	6	Guilherme Caribé	Brazil	22.31	
35	7	7	Piotr Ludwiczak	Poland	22.34	
36	6	3	Miguel Nascimento	Portugal	22.49	
37	6	1	Nicholas Lia	Norway	22.51	
38	7	8	Artem Selin	Germany	22.54	
39	6	8	Matej Duša	Slovakia	22.64	
40	5	6	David Young	Fiji	22.71	NR
41	5	5	Kyle Micallef	Malta	22.89	
42	4	2	Thierry Bollin	Switzerland	22.95	
43	5	3	Tobi Sijuade	Nigeria	23.34	
44	5	4	Evgenii Somov	Individual Neutral Athletes	23.43	
45	5	1	Alex Joachim	Saint Vincent and the Grenadines	23.59	NR
46	4	5	Belly-Cresus Ganira	Burundi	23.80	NR
47	5	2	Alaa Maso	Refugee Olympic Team	23.90	
48	5	7	Damien Shamambo	Zambia	24.09	
49	5	8	Filipe Gomes	Malawi	24.11	
50	4	4	Mohamed Aan Hussain	Maldives	24.22	NR
51	4	6	Aaron Ghebre Owusu	Eritrea	24.25	
52	4	3	Warren Lawrence	Dominica	24.67	
53	4	7	Jion Hosei	Palau	25.67	
54	4	1	Houmed Houssein Barkat	Djibouti	26.00	
55	4	8	Camil Doua	Mauritania	26.02	
56	3	4	Fakhriddin Madkamov	Tajikistan	26.23	
57	3	3	Elhadj N'Gnane Diallo	Guinea	26.45	NR
58	3	8	Magnim Jordano Daou	Togo	26.56	
59	3	5	Souleymane Napare	Burkina Faso	26.66	
59	3	6	Jose Tati	Cape Verde	26.66	
61	3	2	Ousman Jobe	The Gambia	26.97	
62	3	7	Joshua Wyse	Sierra Leone	27.11	
63	3	1	Fahim Anwari	Afghanistan	27.14	
64	2	5	Phillip Kinono	Marshall Islands	27.43	
65	2	6	Freddy Mayala	Republic of the Congo	27.52	
66	1	4	Pedro Rogery	Guinea-Bissau	28.34	NR
67	2	7	Higinio Ndong Obama	Equatorial Guinea	28.42	
68	2	3	Adam Mpali	Gabon	28.47	
69	2	2	Troy Nisbett	Saint Kitts and Nevis	28.71	
70	2	4	Aristote Ndombe Impelenga	Democratic Republic of the Congo	29.04	
71	2	1	Jolanio Guterres	Timor-Leste	30.04	
72	1	3	Marouane Mamane Hamissou Abba	Niger	30.66	
73	1	5	Terence Tengue	Central African Republic	30.96	
	8	1	Shane Ryan	Ireland	Did not start	

== Semifinals ==
Two semifinals took place on 1 August, starting at 20:46. The swimmers with the best eight times in the semifinals advanced to the final. Proud and McEvoy both finished in 21.38 seconds to take the joint fastest seed, while Leonardo Deplano of Italy clocked 21.50 seconds for the third fastest time. Also among the qualifiers were Crooks, Dressel, Manaudou and Kristian Gkolomeev of Greece. France's Maxime Grousset also originally qualified with the sixth fastest time, but he withdrew which allowed Josh Liendo of Canada to qualify. Fannon of Ireland set another national record of 21.74 seconds, beating his record set in the heats by 0.05 seconds to finish tenth.

Results
Rank	Heat	Lane	Swimmer	Nation	Time	Notes
1	2	3	Ben Proud	Great Britain	21.38	Q
1	2	4	Cameron McEvoy	Australia	21.38	Q
3	2	6	Leonardo Deplano	Italy	21.50	Q
4	1	4	Jordan Crooks	Cayman Islands	21.54	Q
5	1	1	Caeleb Dressel	United States	21.58	Q
6	1	8	Maxime Grousset	France	21.60	WD
7	2	2	Kristian Gkolomeev	Greece	21.62	Q
8	2	5	Florent Manaudou	France	21.64	Q
9	2	8	Josh Liendo	Canada	21.69	q
10	1	3	Thomas Fannon	Ireland	21.74	NR
11	2	7	Vladyslav Bukhov	Ukraine	21.76	
12	1	5	Lorenzo Zazzeri	Italy	21.83	
13	1	2	Meiron Cheruti	Israel	21.91	
14	1	6	Ben Armbruster	Australia	21.94	
15	1	7	Gabriel Castaño	Mexico	21.99	
16	2	1	Diogo Ribeiro	Portugal	22.01	

== Final ==
Race animation based on the split data released by the French Swimming Federation (click to view)

External Video
- Men's 50-metre freestyle final – published by the International Olympic Committee via YouTube

The final took place at 20:30 on 2 August. McEvoy had the fastest reaction time of 0.56 seconds. By 15 metres, Dressel had taken first place with a stronger dive and underwater; McEvoy had dropped to fifth. Proud and Crooks were tied in second.

At 25 metres, McEvoy had overtaken Crooks to take third, and by 45 metres McEvoy was in first. Proud retained his second place position and was 0.26 seconds ahead of Crooks in third. Over the last five metres, McEvoy and Proud retained their positions to win gold and silver, while Manaudou overtook Crooks to claim the bronze, with Crooks dropping to eighth. Liendo finished fourth, missing out on a medal by 0.02 seconds.

The gold was McEvoy's first Olympic medal in an individual event, and it was Proud's first Olympic medal in any event. Manaudou's podium finish made him the first swimmer ever to win four consecutive Olympic medals in the event, which he achieved in front of his home crowd. The average age of the medalists was 30 years old.

Results
Rank	Lane	Swimmer	Nation	Time
1st place, gold medalist(s)	5	Cameron McEvoy	Australia	21.25
2nd place, silver medalist(s)	4	Ben Proud	Great Britain	21.30
3rd place, bronze medalist(s)	1	Florent Manaudou	France	21.56
4	8	Josh Liendo	Canada	21.58
5	7	Kristian Gkolomeev	Greece	21.59
6	2	Caeleb Dressel	United States	21.61
7	3	Leonardo Deplano	Italy	21.62
8	6	Jordan Crooks	Cayman Islands	21.64

Graph illustrating the race progression, based on split data released by the French Swimming Federation

Statistics
Name	Underwater distance (m)	Underwater speed (m/s)	15 metre split (s)	25 metre split (s)	Time (s)	Stroke rate (strokes/min)
Cameron McEvoy	12.04	3.70	5.11	9.59	21.25	63.1
Ben Proud	13.15	3.86	5.02	9.54	21.30	62.1
Florent Manaudou	13.24	3.75	5.10	9.62	21.56	60.4
Josh Liendo	14.34	3.57	5.21	9.83	21.58	60.9
Kristian Gkolomeev	10.19	3.85	5.27	9.82	21.59	59.5
Caeleb Dressel	14.06	3.84	4.97	9.50	21.61	64.0
Leonardo Deplano	11.65	3.81	5.28	9.79	21.62	66.5
Jordan Crooks	14.67	3.79	5.02	9.60	21.64	61.2
