= Eritrea at the 2024 World Aquatics Championships =

- Flag of Eritrea
- World Aquatics code: ERI
- National federation: Eritrean National Swimming Association

in Doha, Qatar
- Competitors: 2 in 1 sport
- Medals: Gold 0 Silver 0 Bronze 0 Total 0

World Aquatics Championships appearances
- 2019; 2022–2023; 2024; 2025

Eritrea competed at the 2024 World Aquatics Championships in Doha, Qatar from 2 to 18 February.

== Competitors ==
The following is the list of competitors in the Championships.

| Sport | Men | Women | Total |
|---|---|---|---|
| Swimming | 1 | 1 | 2 |
| Total | 1 | 1 | 2 |

== Swimming ==
Djibouti entered 2 swimmers.

Men

| Athlete | Event | Heat | | Semifinal | | Final | |
| Athlete | Event | Time | Rank | Time | Rank | Time | Rank |
|---|---|---|---|---|---|---|---|
| Aaron Ghebre Owusu | 50 metre freestyle | 25.66 | 84 | Did not advance | | | |
| Aaron Ghebre Owusu | 100 metre butterfly | 1:05.63 | 65 | Did not advance | | | |

Women

| Athlete | Event | Heat | | Semifinal | | Final | |
| Athlete | Event | Time | Rank | Time | Rank | Time | Rank |
|---|---|---|---|---|---|---|---|
| Christina Rach | 50 metre freestyle | 28.08 | 66 | Did not advance | | | |
| Christina Rach | 100 metre freestyle | 1:01.64 | 54 | Did not advance | | | |
