= List of Democratic Republic of the Congo records in swimming =

The Democratic Republic of the Congo records in swimming are the fastest ever performances of swimmers from the Democratic Republic of the Congo, which are recognised and ratified by the Fédération de Natation en République Démocratique du Congo.

All records were set in finals unless noted otherwise.

== Long Course (50 m) ==
=== Men ===
Event	Time		Name	Club	Date	Meet	Location	Ref
50 m freestyle	27.88	h	Aristoto Ndombe	Democratic Republic of the Congo	16 February 2024	World Championships	Doha, Qatar	
100 m freestyle	1:09.19	h	Mubikayi Sokomai	Democratic Republic of the Congo	8 September 2015	African Games	Brazzaville, Congo	
200 m freestyle								
400 m freestyle								
800 m freestyle								
1500 m freestyle								
50 m backstroke								
100 m backstroke								
200 m backstroke								
50 m breaststroke	34.54	h	Yves Munyu	Democratic Republic of the Congo	12 March 2024	African Games	Accra, Ghana	
100 m breaststroke	1:19.50	h	Yves Munyu	Democratic Republic of the Congo	30 April 2024	African Championships	Luanda, Angola	
200 m breaststroke								
50 m butterfly	32.97	h	Jason Ngondo-Mputu	Democratic Republic of the Congo	30 April 2024	African Championships	Luanda, Angola	
100 m butterfly								
200 m butterfly								
200 m individual medley								
400 m individual medley								
4×100 m freestyle relay								
4×200 m freestyle relay								
4×100 m medley relay								

Legend: # – Record awaiting ratification by Fédération de Natation en République Démocratique du Congo; WR – World record; AF – African record; e – equalled existing record;
Records not set in finals: h – heat; sf – semifinal; r – relay 1st leg; rh – relay heat 1st leg; b – B final; † – en route to final mark; so – swim-off; tt – time trial

=== Women ===
Event	Time	Name	Club	Date	Meet	Location	Ref
50 m freestyle							
100 m freestyle							
200 m freestyle							
400 m freestyle							
800 m freestyle							
1500 m freestyle							
50 m backstroke							
100 m backstroke							
200 m backstroke							
50 m breaststroke							
100 m breaststroke							
200 m breaststroke							
50 m butterfly							
100 m butterfly							
200 m butterfly							
200 m individual medley							
400 m individual medley							
4×100 m freestyle relay							
4×200 m freestyle relay							
4×100 m medley relay							

Legend: # – Record awaiting ratification by Fédération de Natation en République Démocratique du Congo; WR – World record; AF – African record; e – equalled existing record;
Records not set in finals: h – heat; sf – semifinal; r – relay 1st leg; rh – relay heat 1st leg; b – B final; † – en route to final mark; so – swim-off; tt – time trial

== Short Course (25 m) ==
=== Men ===
Event	Time		Name	Club	Date	Meet	Location	Ref
50m freestyle	30.30	h	Taylor Ebwa	Democratic Republic of the Congo	13 December 2012	World Championships	Istanbul, Turkey	
100 m freestyle								
200 m freestyle								
400 m freestyle								
800 m freestyle								
1500 m freestyle								
50 m backstroke								
100 m backstroke								
200 m backstroke								
50m breaststroke								
100 m breaststroke								
200 m breaststroke								
50 m butterfly								
100 m butterfly								
200 m butterfly								
100 m individual medley								
200 m individual medley								
400 m individual medley								
4×50 m freestyle relay								
4×100 m freestyle relay								
4×200 m freestyle relay								
4×50 m medley relay								
4×100 m medley relay								

Legend: # – Record awaiting ratification by Fédération de Natation en République Démocratique du Congo; WR – World record; AF – African record; e – equalled existing record;
Records not set in finals: h – heat; sf – semifinal; r – relay 1st leg; rh – relay heat 1st leg; b – B final; † – en route to final mark; so – swim-off; tt – time trial

=== Women ===
Event	Time	Name	Club	Date	Meet	Location	Ref
50 m freestyle							
100 m freestyle							
200 m freestyle							
400 m freestyle							
800 m freestyle							
1500 m freestyle							
50m backstroke							
100m backstroke							
200m backstroke							
50 m breaststroke							
100 m breaststroke							
200 m breaststroke							
50 m butterfly							
100 m butterfly							
200 m butterfly							
100 m individual medley							
200 m individual medley							
400 m individual medley							
4×50 m freestyle relay							
4×100 m freestyle relay							
4×200 m freestyle relay							
4×50 m medley relay							
4×100 m medley relay							

Legend: # – Record awaiting ratification by Fédération de Natation en République Démocratique du Congo; WR – World record; AF – African record; e – equalled existing record;
Records not set in finals: h – heat; sf – semifinal; r – relay 1st leg; rh – relay heat 1st leg; b – B final; † – en route to final mark; so – swim-off; tt – time trial
