= Timor-Leste at the 2017 World Aquatics Championships =

- Flag of East Timor
- World Aquatics code: TLS
- National federation: Timorese Swimming Federation

in Budapest, Hungary
- Competitors: 1 in 1 sport
- Medals: Gold 0 Silver 0 Bronze 0 Total 0

World Aquatics Championships appearances
- 2017; 2019; 2022; 2023; 2024; 2025

East Timor competed at the 2017 World Aquatics Championships in Budapest, Hungary from 14 to 30 July.

== Swimming ==
East Timor received a Universality invitation from FINA to send a female swimmer to the World Championships.

Athlete	Event	Heat		Semifinal		Final	
Athlete	Event	Time	Rank	Time	Rank	Time	Rank
Imelda Ximenes Belo	Women's 50 m freestyle	34.63	82	did not advance			
Imelda Ximenes Belo	Women's 100 m freestyle	1:19.52	78	did not advance			
