= Mauritania at the 2024 World Aquatics Championships =

- Flag of Mauritania
- World Aquatics code: MTN
- National federation: Mauritanian Swimming Federation

in Doha, Qatar
- Competitors: 1 in 1 sport
- Medals: Gold 0 Silver 0 Bronze 0 Total 0

World Aquatics Championships appearances
- 1973; 1975; 1978; 1982; 1986; 1991; 1994; 1998; 2001; 2003; 2005; 2007; 2009; 2011; 2013–2023; 2024; 2025

Mauritania competed at the 2024 World Aquatics Championships in Doha, Qatar from 2 to 18 February.

== Swimming ==
The mauritanian swimmer has achieved qualifying standards in the following events.

Men

Athlete	Event	Heat		Semifinal		Final	
Athlete	Event	Time	Rank	Time	Rank	Time	Rank
Camil Doua	50 m freestyle	25.93	89	did not advance			
Camil Doua	100 m freestyle	57.80	95	did not advance			
