= Turks and Caicos Islands at the 2022 World Aquatics Championships =

- Flag of the Turks and Caicos Islands
- World Aquatics code: TCA

in Budapest, Hungary
- Competitors: 1 in 1 sport
- Medals: Gold 0 Silver 0 Bronze 0 Total 0

World Aquatics Championships appearances
- 2022; 2023; 2024; 2025

Turks and Caicos Islands competed at the 2022 World Aquatics Championships in Budapest, Hungary from 18 June to 3 July. This is the Turks and Caicos Islands' first appearance at the FINA World Aquatics Championships.

== Swimming ==
A swimmer from Turks and Caicos Islands, Rohan Karim Shearer, achieved qualifying standards in the following events.

Athlete	Event	Heat		Semifinal		Final	
Athlete	Event	Time	Rank	Time	Rank	Time	Rank
Rohan Karim Shearer	Men's 50 m freestyle	25.50	75	Did not advance			
Rohan Karim Shearer	Men's 50 m backstroke	28.89	46	Did not advance			
