= Swimming at the 2022 Mediterranean Games – Men's 4 × 100 metre freestyle relay =

Men's 4 × 100 metre freestyle relay at the 2022 Mediterranean Games
- Location: Bir El Djir, Algeria
- Dates: 3 July
- Competitors: 32 from 8 nations
- Teams: 8
- Winning time: 3:15.77

Medalists
gold medal	Luca Serio; Alessandro Bori; Giovanni Carraro; Filippo Megli	Italy
silver medal	Andreas Vazaios; Stergios Bilas; Kristian Gkolomeev; Dimitrios Markos	Greece
bronze medal	Charles Rihoux; Mathias Even; Tom Hug-Dreyfus; Arthur Berol	France

The men's 4 × 100 metre freestyle relay competition at the 2022 Mediterranean Games was held on 3 July 2022 at the Aquatic Center of the Olympic Complex in Bir El Djir.

== Records ==
Prior to this competition, the existing world and Mediterranean Games records were as follows:

World record	United States	3:08.24	Beijing, China	11 August 2008
Mediterranean Games record	France	3:12.03	Pescara, Italy	28 June 2009

== Results ==
The final was held at 19:44.

Rank	Lane	Nation	Swimmers	Time	Notes
1st place, gold medalist(s)	4	Italy	Luca Serio (49.79); Alessandro Bori (48.85); Giovanni Carraro (48.68); Filippo Megli (48.45)	3:15.77	
2nd place, silver medalist(s)	5	Greece	Andreas Vazaios (49.46); Stergios Bilas (49.01); Kristian Gkolomeev (48.24); Dimitrios Markos (49.93)	3:16.64	
3rd place, bronze medalist(s)	1	France	Charles Rihoux (49.00); Mathias Even (49.19); Tom Hug-Dreyfus (50.22); Arthur Berol (49.63)	3:18.04	
4	3	Turkey	Emre Gürdenli (49.90); Doğa Çelik (50.58); Baturalp Ünlü (49.23); Emre Sakçı (49.64)	3:19.35	
5	8	Spain	Luis Domínguez (49.73); Mario Mollà (49.63); Juan Segura (49.88); Miguel Martínez (50.86)	3:20.10	
6	2	Portugal	Miguel Nascimento (49.88); Diogo Ribeiro (48.22); Francisco Santos (50.74); João Costa (51.82)	3:20.66	NR
7	7	Cyprus	Andreas Pantziaros (54.05); Christos Manoli (52.55); Filippos Iakovidis (53.20); Markos Iakovidis (52.53)	3:32.33	
	6	Algeria	Malachy Belkhelladi (52.05); Fares Benzidoun; Mehdi Nazim Benbara; Youcef Bouzouia	Disqualified	
