= 2023 European U-23 Swimming Championships =

International swimming competition

- Host city: Dublin, Ireland
- Dates: 11 to 13 August
- Main venue: Sports Ireland Campus

The 2023 European U-23 Swimming Championships were held from 11 to 13 August 2023 in Dublin, Ireland. This is the first edition of these championships. The Championships were for swimmers aged 19 to 23.

In line with the rules of the new championship, guest non-European nations were invited, in this case the United States, South Africa and Zimbabwe. Swimmers from these nations received 'commemorative medals' reflecting their position on the podium in the race, but were disregarded for the purposes of European Championship medals.

== Results ==
=== Men ===
Event	Gold		Silver		Bronze		Commemorative
50 m freestyle	Stergios-Marios Bilas; Greece	21.83	Nicholas Lia; Norway	21.95	Vladyslav Bukhov; Ukraine	21.96	
100 m freestyle	Edward Mildred; Great Britain	48.90	Ralph Daleiden; Luxembourg	48.96	Alexander Cohoon; Great Britain Sean Niewold; Netherlands	49.16	(gold) Patrick Sammon (United States)
200 m freestyle	Dimitrios Markos; Greece	1:46.65 NR	Yann Le Goff; France	1:47.85	Eytan ben Shitrit; Israel	1:48.01	(silver) Patrick Sammon (United States); (bronze) Aaron Shackell (United States)
400 m freestyle	Petar Mitsin; Bulgaria	3:46.16	Daniel Wiffen; Ireland	3:47.57	Dimitrios Markos; Greece	3:50.42	(bronze) Rex Maurer (United States)
800 m freestyle	Sven Schwarz; Germany	7:41.77	Daniel Wiffen; Ireland	7:45.59	Luca de Tullio; Italy	7:58.20	
1500 m freestyle	Daniel Wiffen; Ireland	14:35.79	Sven Schwarz; Germany	14:43.53	Luca de Tullio; Italy	14:54.31	
Skins race non-championship	Vladyslav Bukhov; Ukraine	24.49	Jere Hribar; Croatia	25.18	Sean Niewold; Netherlands	23.85	
50 m backstroke	Jonathon Adam; Great Britain	25.12	Evangelos Makrygiannis; Greece	25.13	Miroslav Knedla; Czech Republic	25.30	(gold) Pieter Coetze (South Africa)
50 m backstroke	Jonathon Adam; Great Britain	25.12	Evangelos Makrygiannis; Greece	25.13	Adam Maraana; Israel	25.30	(gold) Pieter Coetze (South Africa)
100 m backstroke	Jonathon Adam; Great Britain	53.67	Kai van Westering; Netherlands	54.08	Evangelos Makrygiannis; Greece	54.40	(gold) Pieter Coetze (South Africa)
200 m backstroke	Westering Kai Van; Netherlands	1:57.86	Charlie Brown; Great Britain	1:58.05	Adam Jaszo; Hungary	1:58.72	(gold) Hunter Tapp (United States); (silver) Pieter Coetze (South Africa)
50 m breaststroke	Simone Cerasuolo; Italy	26.94	Koen De Groot; Netherlands	27.03	Archie Goodburn; Great Britain	27.44	
100 m breaststroke	Jan Kalusowski; Poland	1:00.03	Koen de Groot; Netherlands	1:00.37	Luca Janssen; Netherlands	1:00.52	(gold) Mitchell Mason (United States)
200 m breaststroke	Lucien Vergnes; France	2:10.04	Luca Janssen; Netherlands	2:10.79	Maksym Ovchinnikov; Ukraine	2:11.02	
50 m butterfly	Stergios-Marios Bilas; Greece	23.16 NR	Simon Bucher; Austria	23.30	Rasmus Nickelsen; Denmark	23.57	
100 m butterfly	Simon Bucher; Austria	51.69	Jakub Majerski; Poland	51.7	Edward Mildred; Great Britain	51.93	(gold) Gabriel Jett (United States)
200 m butterfly	Krzysztof Chmielewski; Poland	1:54.68	Noyan Taylan; France	1:56.42	Michal Chmielewski; Poland	1:56.72	
200 m individual medley	Ron Polonsky; Israel	1:58.07	Gabor Zombori; Hungary	1:59.17	Eytan ben Shitrit; Israel	1:59.47	(gold) Matthew Sates (South Africa)
400 m individual medley	Cedric Buessing; Germany	4:14.74	Gabor Zombori; Hungary	4:15.47	Emilien Mattenet; France	4:15.91	

=== Women ===
Event	Gold		Silver		Bronze		Commemorative
50 m freestyle	Neza Klancar; Slovenia	24.76 NR	Kornelia Fiedkiewicz; Poland	25.06	Teresa Ivan; Slovakia	25.24	
100 m freestyle	Janja Segel; Slovenia	54.66	Panna Ugrai; Hungary	55.10	Kornelia Fiedkiewicz; Poland	55.17	(silver) Grace Cooper (United States)
200 m freestyle	Lucie Tessariol; France	1:58.42	Francisca Martins; Portugal	1:58.60	Janja Segel; Slovenia	1:58.66	(silver) Grace Cooper (United States)
400 m freestyle	Isabel Marie Gose; Germany	4:05.96	Leonie Maertens; Germany	4:08.57	Francisca Martins; Portugal	4:08.92	
800 m freestyle	Isabel Marie Gose; Germany	8:20.80	Leonie Maertens; Germany	8:29.66	Fleur Lewis; Great Britain	8:39.11	
1500 m freestyle	Isabel Marie Gose; Germany	16:02.89	Celine Rieder; Germany	16:23.17	Leonie Maertens; Germany	16:25.54	
Skins race non-championship	Neza Klancar; Slovenia	25.83	Teresa Ivan; Slovakia	26.72	Nina Stanisavljević; Serbia	26.88	
50 m backstroke	Tessa Giele; Netherlands	27.86	Adela Piskorska; Poland	28.25	Bertille Cousson; France	28.82	(silver) Isabelle Stadden (United States)
100 m backstroke	Adela Piskorska; Poland	1:00.31	Lotte Hosper; Netherlands	1:01.37	Bertille Cousson; France	1:02.01	(gold) Isabelle Stadden (United States)
200 m backstroke	Aviv Barzelay; Israel	2:11.35	Lotte Hosper; Netherlands	2:13.47	Reka Nyiradi; Hungary	2:13.98	(gold) Isabelle Stadden (United States)
50 m breaststroke	Mona McSharry; Ireland	30.37	Anita Bottazzo; Italy	30.59	Silje Slyngstadli; Norway	30.91 NR	(bronze) Kaitlyn Dobler (United States)
100 m breaststroke	Mona McSharry; Ireland	1:06.69	Anita Bottazzo; Italy	1:07.17	Clara Rybak-Andersen; Denmark	1:08.12	(silver) Kaitlyn Dobler (United States)
200 m breaststroke	Mona McSharry; Ireland	2:25.49	Elizabeth Booker; Great Britain	2:26.37	Ana Blazevic; Croatia	2:26.61	
50 m butterfly	Neza Klancar; Slovenia	26.02	Aleyna Ozkan; Turkey	26.17 NR	Julia Maik; Poland	26.26	
100 m butterfly	Keanna Macinnes; Great Britain	58.48	Ellen Walshe; Ireland	58.7	Mariana Pacheco Cunha; Portugal	58.87	(bronze) Emma Sticklen (United States)
200 m butterfly	Keanna Macinnes; Great Britain	2:09.73	Anja Crevar; Serbia	2:10.02 NR	Juliette Marchand; France	2:11.45	(gold) Emma Sticklen (United States)
200 m individual medley	Ellen Walshe; Ireland	2:13.12	Hanna Bergman; Sweden	2:15.12	Kim Emely Herkle; Germany	2:15.42	(gold) Justina Kozan (United States)
400 m individual medley	Ellen Walshe; Ireland	4:42.37	Anja Crevar; Serbia	4:46.86	Camille Tissandie; France	4:49.96	(gold) Justina Kozan (United States)

=== Mixed events ===
Event	Gold		Silver		Bronze		Commemorative
4 × 100 m medley	Poland; Adela Piskorska; Jan Kałusowski; Jakub Majerski; Kornelia Fiedkiewicz	3:46.68	Great Britain; Jonathon Adam; Gregory Butler; Keanna Macinnes; Evelyn Davis	3:47.15	Israel; Adam Maraana; Ron Polonsky; Arielle Hayon; Ayla Spitz	3:49.81	(gold) United States
4 × 100 m freestyle	Poland; Kamil Sieradzki; Jakub Kraska; Julia Maik; Kornelia Fiedkiewicz	3:28.32	Great Britain; Edward Mildred; Alexander Cohoon; Kate Clifton; Evelyn Davis	3:28.52	Germany; Ole Mats Eidam; Timo Sorgius; Nele Schulze; Nina Jazy	3:29.90	(gold) United States

== Medal table ==
2023 European U-23 Swimming Championships

* Host nation (Ireland)

Rank	Nation	Gold	Silver	Bronze	Total
1	Ireland (IRL)*	6	3	0	9
2	Great Britain (GBR)	5	4	4	13
3	Germany (GER)	5	4	2	11
4	Poland (POL)	5	3	3	11
5	Slovenia (SLO)	4	0	1	5
6	Greece (GRE)	3	1	2	6
7	Netherlands (NED)	2	6	3	11
8	France (FRA)	2	2	5	9
9	Israel (ISR)	2	0	4	6
10	Italy (ITA)	1	2	3	6
11	Austria (AUT)	1	1	0	2
12	Ukraine (UKR)	1	0	2	3
13	Bulgaria (BUL)	1	0	0	1
14	Hungary (HUN)	0	3	2	5
15	Serbia (SRB)	0	2	1	3
16	Portugal (POR)	0	1	2	3
17	Croatia (CRO)	0	1	1	2
17	Norway (NOR)	0	1	1	2
17	Slovakia (SVK)	0	1	1	2
20	Luxembourg (LUX)	0	1	0	1
20	Sweden (SWE)	0	1	0	1
20	Turkey (TUR)	0	1	0	1
23	Denmark (DEN)	0	0	2	2
24	Czech Republic (CZE)	0	0	1	1
Totals (24 entries)		38	38	40	116

Source: Medal Standings

2023 Dublin Open U-23 Swimming Championships

* Host nation (Ireland)

Commemorative medals
Rank	Nation	Gold	Silver	Bronze	Total
1	United States (USA)	9	5	4	18
2	South Africa (RSA)	3	1	0	4
Totals (2 entries)		12	6	4	22

Source: Medal Standings
