= Turks and Caicos Islands at the 2023 World Aquatics Championships =

- Flag of the Turks and Caicos Islands
- World Aquatics code: TCA
- National federation: Turks & Caicos Islands Swim Federation
- Website: tciswimfederation.com

in Fukuoka, Japan
- Competitors: 2 in 1 sport
- Medals: Gold 0 Silver 0 Bronze 0 Total 0

World Aquatics Championships appearances
- 2022; 2023; 2024; 2025

Turks and Caicos Islands is set to compete at the 2023 World Aquatics Championships in Fukuoka, Japan from 14 to 30 July.

== Swimming ==
Turks and Caicos Islands entered 2 swimmers.

Men

Athlete	Event	Heat		Semifinal		Final	
Athlete	Event	Time	Rank	Time	Rank	Time	Rank
Tajhari Williams	50 metre freestyle	25.56	92	Did not advance			
Tajhari Williams	50 metre backstroke	29.44	56	Did not advance			

Women

Athlete	Event	Heat		Semifinal		Final	
Athlete	Event	Time	Rank	Time	Rank	Time	Rank
Arleigha Hall	50 metre freestyle	29.40	79	Did not advance			
Arleigha Hall	50 metre butterfly	32.55	58	Did not advance			
