= Bhutan at the 2019 World Aquatics Championships =

- Flag of Bhutan
- FINA code: BHU
- National federation: Bhutan Aquatics Federation

in Gwangju, South Korea
- Competitors: 2 in 1 sport
- Medals: Gold 0 Silver 0 Bronze 0 Total 0

World Aquatics Championships appearances
- 2019; 2022; 2023; 2024

Bhutan competed at the 2019 World Aquatics Championships in Gwangju, South Korea from 12 to 28 July.

== Swimming ==
Bhutan entered two swimmers.

Men

Athlete	Event	Heat		Semifinal		Final	
Athlete	Event	Time	Rank	Time	Rank	Time	Rank
Kinley Lhendup	50 m butterfly	34.21	93	did not advance			
Kinley Lhendup	200 m individual medley	3:00.53	51	did not advance			
Sangay Tenzin	50 m freestyle	29.49	125	did not advance			
Sangay Tenzin	100 m freestyle	1:07.28	120	did not advance			
