= Bhutan at the 2022 World Aquatics Championships =

- Flag of Bhutan
- FINA code: BHU
- National federation: Bhutan Aquatics Federation

in Budapest, Hungary
- Competitors: 2 in 1 sport
- Medals: Gold 0 Silver 0 Bronze 0 Total 0

World Aquatics Championships appearances
- 2019; 2022; 2023; 2024

Bhutan competed at the 2022 World Aquatics Championships in Budapest, Hungary from 18 June to 3 July.

== Swimming ==
Bhutanese swimmers have achieved qualifying standards in the following events.

Athlete	Event	Heat		Semifinal		Final	
Athlete	Event	Time	Rank	Time	Rank	Time	Rank
Kinley Lhendup	Men's 100 m butterfly	1:04.07	64	did not advance			
Kinley Lhendup	Men's 200 m individual medley	2:29.72	43	did not advance			
Sangay Tenzin	Men's 100 m freestyle	57.69	91	did not advance			
Sangay Tenzin	Men's 200 m freestyle	2:08.36	61	did not advance			
