= Eritrea at the 2019 World Aquatics Championships =

- Flag of Eritrea
- FINA code: ERI
- National federation: Eritrean National Swimming Association

in Gwangju, South Korea
- Competitors: 2 in 1 sport
- Medals: Gold 0 Silver 0 Bronze 0 Total 0

World Aquatics Championships appearances
- 2019; 2022–2023; 2024

Eritrea competed at the 2019 World Aquatics Championships in Gwangju, South Korea from 12 to 28 July.

== Swimming ==
Eritrea entered two swimmers.

Men

Athlete	Event	Heat		Semifinal		Final	
Athlete	Event	Time	Rank	Time	Rank	Time	Rank
Daniel Christian	100 m freestyle	55.88	100	did not advance			
Daniel Christian	100 m butterfly	1:00.77	71	did not advance			
Ghirmai Efrem	50 m freestyle	23.92	71	did not advance			
Ghirmai Efrem	50 m backstroke	27.96	56	did not advance			
