= Timor-Leste at the 2024 World Aquatics Championships =

- Flag of Timor-Leste
- FINA code: TLS
- National federation: National Swimming Federation of Timor Leste

in Doha, Qatar
- Competitors: 2 in 1 sport
- Medals: Gold 0 Silver 0 Bronze 0 Total 0

World Aquatics Championships appearances
- 1973; 1975; 1978; 1982; 1986; 1991; 1994; 1998; 2001; 2003; 2005; 2007; 2009; 2011; 2013; 2015; 2017; 2019; 2022; 2023; 2024

Timor-Leste competed at the 2024 World Aquatics Championships in Doha, Qatar from 2 to 18 February.

== Competitors ==
The following is the list of competitors in the Championships.

Sport	Men	Women	Total
Swimming	1	1	2
Total	1	1	2

== Swimming ==
Timor-Leste entered 2 swimmers.

Men

Athlete	Event	Heat		Semifinal		Final	
Athlete	Event	Time	Rank	Time	Rank	Time	Rank
Jolanio Guterres	50 metre freestyle	30.06	113	Did not advance			
Jolanio Guterres	100 metre freestyle	1:09.84	107	Did not advance			

Women

Athlete	Event	Heat		Semifinal		Final	
Athlete	Event	Time	Rank	Time	Rank	Time	Rank
Imelda Ximenes Belo	50 metre freestyle	Did not start		Did not advance			
Imelda Ximenes Belo	100 metre freestyle	1:15.56	81	Did not advance			
