= Swimming at the 2020 Summer Olympics – Men's 50 metre freestyle =

Men's 50 metre freestyle at the Games of the XXXII Olympiad
- Venue: Tokyo Aquatics Centre
- Dates: 30 July 2021 (heats); 31 July 2021 (semifinals); 1 August 2021 (final)
- Competitors: 73 from 66 nations
- Winning time: 21.07 OR

Medalists
1st place, gold medalist(s)		Caeleb Dressel	United States
2nd place, silver medalist(s)		Florent Manaudou	France
3rd place, bronze medalist(s)		Bruno Fratus	Brazil

The men's 50 metre freestyle event at the 2020 Summer Olympics was held from 30 July to 1 August 2021 at the Tokyo Aquatics Centre. It was the event's tenth appearance, first held in 1904 (as 50 yards) and then at every edition since 1988. The event is nicknamed the "splash and dash" event.

The winning margin was 0.48 seconds which as of 2023 is the only time this event has been won by more than 0.25 seconds at the Olympics.

== Summary ==
U.S. swimmer Caeleb Dressel led from start to finish as he surged to an Olympic record time of 21.07, only 0.03 off his personal best time. By doing so, Dressel became the third male swimmer in history (joining Michael Phelps and Mark Spitz) to win three individual titles at a single Games.

At 0.48 seconds behind Dressel, Florent Manaudou claimed his second successive Olympic silver in this event following his triumph in 2012. Brazil's Bruno Fratus finished in 21.57 to win the bronze and his first career Olympic medal at the age of 32. Meanwhile, Dressel's teammate Michael Andrew narrowly missed the podium by two hundredths of a second.

Great Britain's Ben Proud and Greece's Kristian Gkolomeev came equal fifth in 21.72, while Lorenzo Zazzeri of Italy and Thom De Boer of the Netherlands rounded out the finalists.

The medals for competition were presented by Anant Singh, South African IOC member, and the gifts were presented by Husain Al-Musallam, FINA President.

== Records ==
Prior to this competition, the existing world and Olympic records were as follows.

World record	César Cielo (BRA)	20.91	São Paulo, Brazil	18 December 2009
Olympic record	César Cielo (BRA)	21.30	Beijing, China	16 August 2008

The following record was established during the competition:

Date	Event	Swimmer	Nation	Time	Record
August 1	Final	Caeleb Dressel	United States	21.07	OR

== Qualification ==
The Olympic Qualifying Time for the event is 22.01 seconds. Up to two swimmers per National Olympic Committee (NOC) can automatically qualify by swimming that time at an approved qualification event. The Olympic Selection Time is 22.67 seconds. Up to one swimmer per NOC meeting that time is eligible for selection, allocated by world ranking until the maximum quota for all swimming events is reached. NOCs without a male swimmer qualified in any event can also use their universality place.

== Competition format ==
The competition consists of three rounds: heats, semifinals, and a final. The swimmers with the best 16 times in the heats advance to the semifinals. The swimmers with the best 8 times in the semifinals advance to the final. Swim-offs are used as necessary to break ties for advancement to the next round.

== Schedule ==
All times are Japan Standard Time (UTC+9)

Date	Time	Round
Friday, 30 July 2021	19:00	Heats
Saturday, 31 July 2021	11:11	Semifinals
Sunday, 1 August 2021	10:30	Final

== Results ==
=== Heats ===
The swimmers with the top 16 times, regardless of heat, advanced to the semifinals.

Rank	Heat	Lane	Swimmer	Nation	Time	Notes
1	10	4	Caeleb Dressel	United States	21.32	Q
2	10	3	Florent Manaudou	France	21.65	Q
3	9	5	Kristian Gkolomeev	Greece	21.66	Q
4	8	4	Bruno Fratus	Brazil	21.67	Q
5	7	4	Vladyslav Bukhov	Ukraine	21.73	Q
6	8	3	Thom de Boer	Netherlands	21.75	Q
7	8	7	Jesse Puts	Netherlands	21.84	Q
8	8	2	Brent Hayden	Canada	21.85	Q
9	10	7	Lorenzo Zazzeri	Italy	21.86	Q
10	9	1	Kliment Kolesnikov	ROC	21.88	Q
11	8	5	Michael Andrew	United States	21.89	Q
12	9	4	Vladimir Morozov	ROC	21.92	Q
13	10	5	Benjamin Proud	Great Britain	21.93	Q
14	9	8	Alberto Mestre	Venezuela	21.96	Q
15	8	6	Maxime Grousset	France	21.97	Q
15	10	6	Paweł Juraszek	Poland	21.97	Q
17	9	7	Meiron Cheruti	Israel	22.01	
18	8	1	Joshua Liendo	Canada	22.03	
19	7	7	Santo Condorelli	Italy	22.14	
19	8	8	Nikola Miljenić	Croatia	22.14	
19	9	2	Yu Hexin	China	22.14	
22	7	8	Heiko Gigler	Austria	22.17	
23	9	6	Björn Seeliger	Sweden	22.19	
24	7	6	Ali Khalafalla	Egypt	22.22	
24	10	8	Brad Tandy	South Africa	22.22	
26	9	3	Ari-Pekka Liukkonen	Finland	22.25	
26	10	2	Maxim Lobanovskij	Hungary	22.25	
28	6	4	Andrej Barna	Serbia	22.29	
29	10	1	Cameron McEvoy	Australia	22.31	
30	7	1	Gabriel Castaño	Mexico	22.32	
31	7	2	Konrad Czerniak	Poland	22.33	
32	7	3	Ian Ho	Hong Kong	22.45	
33	6	7	Dylan Carter	Trinidad and Tobago	22.46	
33	6	8	Brett Fraser	Cayman Islands	22.46	
35	6	1	Enzo Martínez	Uruguay	22.52	
36	6	5	Renzo Tjon-A-Joe	Suriname	22.56	
37	7	5	Oussama Sahnoune	Algeria	22.61	
38	6	3	Santiago Grassi	Argentina	22.67	
39	6	6	Hwang Sun-woo	South Korea	22.74	
40	6	2	David Popovici	Romania	22.77	
41	5	5	Luke Gebbie	Philippines	22.84	
42	5	4	Emir Muratović	Bosnia and Herzegovina	22.91	
43	5	3	Artur Barseghyan	Armenia	23.14	
44	5	2	Alaa Maso	Refugee Olympic Team	23.30	
45	5	6	Nikolas Antoniou	Cyprus	23.38	
46	5	7	Ghirmai Efrem	Eritrea	23.94	
47	5	8	Filipe Gomes	Malawi	24.00	
48	5	1	Myagmaryn Delgerkhüü	Mongolia	24.63	
49	4	5	Shane Cadogan	Saint Vincent and the Grenadines	24.71	
50	4	4	Alassane Seydou Lancina	Niger	24.75	
51	4	3	Mohammed Ariful Islam	Bangladesh	24.81	
52	4	6	Puch Hem	Cambodia	24.91	
53	4	7	Marc Dansou	Benin	24.99	
54	4	8	Adama Ouedraogo	Burkina Faso	25.22	NR
55	4	1	Eloi Maniraguha	Rwanda	25.38	
56	4	2	Shaquille Moosa	Zambia	25.54	
57	3	6	Mawupemon Otogbe	Togo	25.68	
58	3	5	Troy Pina	Cape Verde	25.97	
59	3	4	Santisouk Inthavong	Laos	26.04	
60	3	3	Olimjon Ishanov	Tajikistan	26.12	
61	3	2	Mamadou Bah	Guinea	26.52	
62	3	8	Abdelmalik Muktar	Ethiopia	26.65	
63	3	7	Simanga Dlamini	Eswatini	26.94	
64	2	2	Charly Ndjoume	Cameroon	27.22	
65	2	6	Houssein Gaber Ibrahim	Djibouti	27.41	
66	2	5	Ebrima Buaro	The Gambia	27.44	
67	2	4	Shawn Dingilius-Wallace	Palau	27.46	
68	1	5	Adam Girard de Langlade Mpali	Gabon	27.66	
69	2	3	Fahim Anwari	Afghanistan	27.67	
70	2	7	Phillip Kinono	Marshall Islands	27.86	
71	3	1	Joshua Wyse	Sierra Leone	27.90	
72	1	4	José da Silva Viegas	Timor-Leste	28.59	
73	1	3	Diosdado Miko Eyanga	Equatorial Guinea	31.03	

=== Semifinals ===
The swimmers with the best 8 times, regardless of heat, advanced to the final.

Rank	Heat	Lane	Swimmer	Nation	Time	Notes
1	2	4	Caeleb Dressel	United States	21.42	Q
2	1	4	Florent Manaudou	France	21.53	Q
3	1	5	Bruno Fratus	Brazil	21.60	Q
3	2	5	Kristian Gkolomeev	Greece	21.60	Q
5	2	1	Benjamin Proud	Great Britain	21.67	Q
5	2	7	Michael Andrew	United States	21.67	Q
7	2	2	Lorenzo Zazzeri	Italy	21.75	Q
8	1	3	Thom de Boer	Netherlands	21.78	Q
9	1	2	Kliment Kolesnikov	ROC	21.82	
9	1	6	Brent Hayden	Canada	21.82	
11	2	3	Vladyslav Bukhov	Ukraine	21.83	
12	2	6	Jesse Puts	Netherlands	21.87	
12	2	8	Maxime Grousset	France	21.87	
14	1	8	Paweł Juraszek	Poland	21.88	
15	1	1	Alberto Mestre	Venezuela	22.22	
16	1	7	Vladimir Morozov	ROC	22.25	

=== Final ===
Rank	Lane	Swimmer	Nation	Time	Notes
1st place, gold medalist(s)	4	Caeleb Dressel	United States	21.07	OR
2nd place, silver medalist(s)	5	Florent Manaudou	France	21.55	
3rd place, bronze medalist(s)	3	Bruno Fratus	Brazil	21.57	
4	7	Michael Andrew	United States	21.60	
5	2	Benjamin Proud	Great Britain	21.72	
5	6	Kristian Gkolomeev	Greece	21.72	
7	1	Lorenzo Zazzeri	Italy	21.78	
8	8	Thom de Boer	Netherlands	21.79	
