= Bhutan at the 2023 World Aquatics Championships =

- Flag of Bhutan
- FINA code: BHU
- National federation: Bhutan Aquatics Federation

in Fukuoka, Japan
- Competitors: 2 in 1 sport
- Medals: Gold 0 Silver 0 Bronze 0 Total 0

World Aquatics Championships appearances
- 2019; 2022; 2023; 2024

Bhutan is set to compete at the 2023 World Aquatics Championships in Fukuoka, Japan from 14 to 30 July.

== Swimming ==
Bhutan entered 2 swimmers.

Men

Athlete	Event	Heat		Semifinal		Final	
Athlete	Event	Time	Rank	Time	Rank	Time	Rank
Kinley Lhendup	100 metre butterfly	1:02.84	69	Did not advance			
Kinley Lhendup	200 metre individual medley	2:28.39	48	Did not advance			
Sangay Tenzin	100 metre freestyle	55.95	102	Did not advance			
Sangay Tenzin	200 metre freestyle	2:06.93	71	Did not advance			
