= Mauritania at the 2011 World Aquatics Championships =

- Flag of Mauritania
- FINA code: MTN
- National federation: Mauritanian Swimming Federation

in Shanghai, China
- Competitors: 3 in 1 sport
- Medals: Gold 0 Silver 0 Bronze 0 Total 0

World Aquatics Championships appearances
- 1973; 1975; 1978; 1982; 1986; 1991; 1994; 1998; 2001; 2003; 2005; 2007; 2009; 2011; 2013–2023; 2024

Mauritania competed at the 2011 World Aquatics Championships in Shanghai, China between July 16 and 31, 2011.

== Swimming ==
Mauritania qualified 3 swimmers.

Men

Athlete	Event	Heats		Semifinals		Final	
Athlete	Event	Time	Rank	Time	Rank	Time	Rank
Eycub Leebeid	Men's 50m Freestyle	45.18	116	did not advance			
Hamza Labeid	Men's 50m Freestyle	DSQ		did not advance			

Women

Athlete	Event	Heats		Semifinals		Final	
Athlete	Event	Time	Rank	Time	Rank	Time	Rank
Soukeina Abdellahi	Women's 50m Freestyle	DNS		did not advance			
