= Turks and Caicos Islands at the 2024 World Aquatics Championships =

- Flag of the Turks and Caicos Islands
- FINA code: TCA
- National federation: Turks & Caicos Islands Swim Federation

in Doha, Qatar
- Competitors: 2 in 1 sport
- Medals: Gold 0 Silver 0 Bronze 0 Total 0

World Aquatics Championships appearances
- 2022; 2023; 2024

Turks and Caicos Islands competed at the 2024 World Aquatics Championships in Doha, Qatar from 2 to 18 February.

== Competitors ==
The following is the list of competitors in the Championships.

Sport	Men	Women	Total
Swimming	1	1	2
Total	1	1	2

== Swimming ==
Turks and Caicos Islands entered 2 swimmers.

Men

Athlete	Event	Heat		Semifinal		Final	
Athlete	Event	Time	Rank	Time	Rank	Time	Rank
Tajhari Williams	50 metre freestyle	25.35	82	Did not advance			
Tajhari Williams	50 metre backstroke	28.78	41	Did not advance			

Women

Athlete	Event	Heat		Semifinal		Final	
Athlete	Event	Time	Rank	Time	Rank	Time	Rank
Arleigha Hall	50 metre freestyle	29.70	83	Did not advance			
Arleigha Hall	50 metre butterfly	32.94	50	Did not advance			
