= Bhutan at the 2024 World Aquatics Championships =

- Flag of Bhutan
- FINA code: BHU
- National federation: Bhutan Aquatics Federation

in Doha, Qatar
- Competitors: 2 in 1 sport
- Medals: Gold 0 Silver 0 Bronze 0 Total 0

World Aquatics Championships appearances
- 2019; 2022; 2023; 2024

Bhutan competed at the 2024 World Aquatics Championships in Doha, Qatar from 2 to 18 February.

== Competitors ==
The following is the list of competitors in the Championships.

Sport	Men	Women	Total
Swimming	2	0	2
Total	2	0	2

== Swimming ==
Bhutan entered 2 swimmers.

Men

Athlete	Event	Heat		Semifinal		Final	
Athlete	Event	Time	Rank	Time	Rank	Time	Rank
Kinley Lhendup	50 metre freestyle	26.62	94	Did not advance			
Kinley Lhendup	100 metre butterfly	1:01.87	62	Did not advance			
Sangay Tenzin	100 metre freestyle	55.42	89	Did not advance			
Sangay Tenzin	200 metre freestyle	2:04.13	65	Did not advance			
