= Timor-Leste at the 2023 World Aquatics Championships =

- Flag of Timor-Leste
- FINA code: TLS
- National federation: National Swimming Federation of Timor Leste

in Fukuoka, Japan
- Competitors: 2 in 1 sport

World Aquatics Championships appearances
- 1973; 1975; 1978; 1982; 1986; 1991; 1994; 1998; 2001; 2003; 2005; 2007; 2009; 2011; 2013; 2015; 2017; 2019; 2022; 2023; 2024

Timor-Leste is set to compete at the 2023 World Aquatics Championships in Fukuoka, Japan from 14 to 30 July.

== Swimming ==
Timor-Leste entered 2 swimmers.

Men

Athlete	Event	Heat		Semifinal		Final	
Athlete	Event	Time	Rank	Time	Rank	Time	Rank
Jolanio Guterres	50 metre freestyle	30.36	115	Did not advance			
Jolanio Guterres	100 metre freestyle	1:12.97	114	Did not advance			

Women

Athlete	Event	Heat		Semifinal		Final	
Athlete	Event	Time	Rank	Time	Rank	Time	Rank
Imelda Ximenes Belo	50 metre freestyle	34.14	98	Did not advance			
Imelda Ximenes Belo	100 metre freestyle	1:17.14	77	Did not advance			
