= Timor-Leste at the 2019 World Aquatics Championships =

- Flag of East Timor
- FINA code: TLS
- National federation: Timorese Swimming Federation

in Gwangju, South Korea
- Competitors: 3 in 1 sport
- Medals: Gold 0 Silver 0 Bronze 0 Total 0

World Aquatics Championships appearances
- 1973; 1975; 1978; 1982; 1986; 1991; 1994; 1998; 2001; 2003; 2005; 2007; 2009; 2011; 2013; 2015; 2017; 2019; 2022; 2023; 2024

East Timor competed at the 2019 World Aquatics Championships in Gwangju, South Korea from 12 to 28 July.

== Swimming ==
East Timor entered three swimmers.

Men

Athlete	Event	Heat		Semifinal		Final	
Athlete	Event	Time	Rank	Time	Rank	Time	Rank
Domingos da Silva	100 m freestyle	1:06.71	119	did not advance			
José da Silva Viegas	50 m freestyle	29.51	126	did not advance			

Women

Athlete	Event	Heat		Semifinal		Final	
Athlete	Event	Time	Rank	Time	Rank	Time	Rank
Imelda Ximenes	50 m freestyle	34.64	95	did not advance			
Imelda Ximenes	100 m freestyle	1:18.03	91	did not advance			
