= Kristian Gkolomeev =

Greek swimmer (born 1993)

Personal information
- Nationality: Greek; Bulgarian
- Born: 4 July 1993 (age 33) Velingrad, Bulgaria
- Height: 2.03 m (6 ft 8 in)
- Weight: 90 kg (198 lb)

Sport
- Sport: Swimming
- Strokes: Freestyle
- Club: Panathinaikos, LA Current
Medal record
Men's Swimming
Representing Greece
World Championships (LC)
| Silver medal – second place | 2019 Gwangju | 50 m freestyle |
European Championships (LC)
| Gold medal – first place | 2024 Belgrade | 50 m freestyle |
| Silver medal – second place | 2018 Glasgow | 50 m freestyle |
| Bronze medal – third place | 2020 Budapest | 50 m freestyle |
| Bronze medal – third place | 2022 Rome | 50 m freestyle |
| Bronze medal – third place | 2024 Belgrade | 4x100 m freestyle |
Mediterranean Games
| Gold medal – first place | 2018 Tarragona | 50 m butterfly |
| Gold medal – first place | 2018 Tarragona | 50 m freestyle |
| Gold medal – first place | 2022 Oran | 50 m freestyle |
| Silver medal – second place | 2013 Mersin | 4×100 m medley |
| Silver medal – second place | 2022 Oran | 4×100 m freestyle |
| Bronze medal – third place | 2013 Mersin | 50 m freestyle |
| Bronze medal – third place | 2013 Mersin | 4×100 m freestyle |
| Bronze medal – third place | 2022 Oran | 50 m butterfly |
Representing the Alabama Crimson Tide
| Event | 1st | 2nd | 3rd |
|---|---|---|---|
| NCAA Championships | 3 | 2 | 4 |
| Total | 3 | 2 | 4 |
By race
| Event | 1st | 2nd | 3rd |
|---|---|---|---|
| 50 y freestyle | 1 | 1 | 1 |
| 100 y freestyle | 1 | 0 | 1 |
| 4×50 y freestyle | 0 | 0 | 1 |
| 4×50 y medley | 1 | 1 | 0 |
| 4×100 y medley | 0 | 0 | 1 |
| Total | 3 | 2 | 4 |
NCAA Championships
| Gold medal – first place | 2014 Austin | 50 y freestyle |
| Gold medal – first place | 2015 Iowa City | 100 y freestyle |
| Gold medal – first place | 2016 Atlanta | 4×50 y medley |
| Silver medal – second place | 2015 Iowa City | 50 y freestyle |
| Silver medal – second place | 2015 Iowa City | 4×50 y medley |
| Bronze medal – third place | 2015 Iowa City | 4×100 y medley |
| Bronze medal – third place | 2016 Atlanta | 50 y freestyle |
| Bronze medal – third place | 2016 Atlanta | 100 y freestyle |
| Bronze medal – third place | 2016 Atlanta | 4×50 y freestyle |

Kristian Tsvetanov Gkolomeev (Bulgarian: Кристиан Цветанов Голомеев, Greek: Κριστιάν Τσβετάνοφ Γκολομέεφ, born 4 July 1993) is a Greek former professional swimmer who represented his country at the 2012, 2016, 2020 and 2024 Summer Olympics. He specialized in sprint freestyle and butterfly events.

== Early life ==
Kristian Gkolomeev was born on 4 July 1993 in Velingrad, Bulgaria. His mother, Kristina Golomeeva, died due to a medical error soon after giving birth to Kristian. His family moved to Greece when he was an infant. His father, Tsvetan Golomeev, was a famous Bulgarian swimmer. Tsvetan died in 2010 after an eight-month fight with cancer. Kristian Gkolomeev has two brothers, Nikola and Ivan.

== Personal life ==
In 2018, Kristian married a fellow swimmer, Lindsay Morrow, from his alma mater, the University of Alabama.

== Career ==
At 2011 FINA World Junior Swimming Championships – Lima (PER) Kristian Gkolomeev took 3rd place with time 22.80 (50m freestyle). At the 14th Luxembourg Euro Meet (27.29 January 2012) Gkolomeev finished 9th at Men's 100m freestyle with time 51.31 and was 4th at Men's 50m freestyle (22.92).

At the 2012 Summer Olympics, he competed in the Men's 100 metre freestyle, finishing in 31st place (50.08) overall in the heats, failing to qualify for the semifinals.

At the 2014 NCAA Division I Men's Swimming and Diving Championships, Gkolomeev, as a freshman on the University of Alabama Crimson Tide swim team, tied for first in the 50 yard freestyle and finished 13th in the 100 yard freestyle. He was the first Alabama swimmer in school history to win the NCAA 50 Freestyle title.

At the 2015 NCAA Division I Men's Swimming and Diving Championships, he finished second in the 50 yard freestyle and won the 100 yard freestyle. He earned First Team All-America honors in the 50 yard free, 100 yard free, 200 yard free relay, and 200 and 400 yard medley relays.

At the 2016 NCAA Division I Men's Swimming and Diving Championships, he finished third in the 50 yard freestyle, 100 yard freestyle and 200 yard freestyle relay. He swam the anchor leg on Alabama's winning 200 medley relay team, the school's first NCAA swimming championships relay title.

At the 2016 Summer Olympics, he competed in the men's 50 metre freestyle, finishing 10th in the heats with a time of 21.93 seconds. He qualified for the semifinals where he finished 13th with a time of 21.98 seconds and did not qualify for the final. He also competed in the men's 100 metre freestyle, finishing in 20th place with a time of 48.68 seconds which was a new national record. He did not qualify for the semifinals.

Gkolomeev was also part of the men's 4 × 100 m freestyle relay team which finished 10th in the heats and did not advance to the final and the men's 4 × 100 m medley relay team which finished 15th in the heats and did not advance to the final.

Gkolomeev earned Greece's second ever World Championship medal in swimming, as he finished second at the 50 meters freestyle final at the 2019 FINA World Aquatics Championships in South Korea. The Greek champion was joint second with Brazil's Bruno Fratus, clocking 21.45 seconds, behind American Caeleb Dressel.

In the 2020 Summer Olympics, Gkolomeev competed in the men's 50 metre freestyle, and finished 5th overall.

In the 2024 Summer Olympics, he competed in the men's 50 metre freestyle, and once again finished 5th overall.

== Enhanced Games ==
In May 2025, a video was published of Gkolomeev unofficially breaking the long course 50 metres freestyle world record at a February 2025 private event sponsored by the Enhanced Games by swimming 20.89 seconds, 0.02 seconds faster than the current official record by César Cielo set in 2009. Gkolomeev admitted to taking performance-enhancing drugs before breaking the record, which was not certified by World Aquatics.

In addition to taking performance-enhancing drugs for two weeks, Gkolomeev wore a Jaked bodyskin suit, which were banned from swimming competition in 2010, a year after Cielo's world record performance. A video was also published of Gkolomeev swimming 21.03 seconds in "jammer" competition-legal shorts. For this swim, he was aided by two months of performance-enhancing drugs usage and swam one hundredth second faster than Caeleb Dressel's fastest-ever mark in textile swimwear.

On May 25, 2026, he swam the 50m freestyle at the Enhanced Games in 20.81 seconds, 0.07 seconds faster than the official world record, again in a full-body competition suit banned from World Aquatics sanctioned competition. He was the only athlete to beat a world record at the competition, but this record is not officially recognized.

== Other achievements ==
- World Junior Championships:

Lima 2011: Bronze 50m freestyle, 4th place 4x100m medley

- European Junior Championships:

Belgrade 2011: Silver 50m freestyle

- Balkan Junior Swimming Championships:

Banja Luka 2011: Gold 50m freestyle, Gold 4x100m freestyle, Bronze 100m freestyle

- Multination Junior Swimming Meeting:

Corfu 2011: Gold 50m freestyle, Bronze 4x100m freestyle

- European Championships Long Course:

14th Luxembourg Euro Meet 2012: 9th place 100m freestyle, 4th place 50m freestyle
Debrecen 2012: 4th 50m freestyle

- Olympic Games:

Tokyo 2020: 5th place (21.72) 50m freestyle
Rio 2016: 13th place (21.98) 50m freestyle
Rio 2016: 20th place (48.68) NR 100m freestyle
London 2012: 31st place (50.08) 100m freestyle
