= Democratic Republic of the Congo at the 2013 World Aquatics Championships =

- Flag of the Democratic Republic of the Congo
- FINA code: COD
- National federation: Federation de Natation en Republique Democratique de Congo

in Barcelona, Spain
- Competitors: 2 in 1 sports
- Medals: Gold 0 Silver 0 Bronze 0 Total 0

World Aquatics Championships appearances
- 2013; 2015–2019; 2022; 2023; 2024

The Democratic Republic of the Congo competed at the 2013 World Aquatics Championships in Barcelona, Spain from 19 July to 4 August 2013.

== Swimming ==
Swimmers from the Democratic Republic of the Congo achieved qualifying standards in the following events (up to a maximum of 2 swimmers in each event at the A-standard entry time, and 1 at the B-standard):

Men

Athlete	Event	Heat		Semifinal		Final	
Athlete	Event	Time	Rank	Time	Rank	Time	Rank
Tshisungu Kalala	50 m breaststroke	DSQ		did not advance			
Moise Ngondo	50 m freestyle	29.08	100	did not advance			
