= Democratic Republic of the Congo at the 2024 World Aquatics Championships =

- Flag of the Democratic Republic of the Congo
- FINA code: COD
- National federation: Federation de Natation en Republique Democratique de Congo

in Doha, Qatar
- Competitors: 2 in 1 sport
- Medals: Gold 0 Silver 0 Bronze 0 Total 0

World Aquatics Championships appearances
- 2013; 2015–2019; 2022; 2023; 2024

Democratic Republic of the Congo competed at the 2024 World Aquatics Championships in Doha, Qatar from 2 to 18 February.

== Competitors ==
The following is the list of competitors in the Championships.

Sport	Men	Women	Total
Swimming	2	0	2
Total	2	0	2

== Swimming ==
Democratic Republic of the Congo entered 2 swimmers.

Men

Athlete	Event	Heat		Semifinal		Final	
Athlete	Event	Time	Rank	Time	Rank	Time	Rank
Yves Munyu	50 metre breaststroke	35.62	56	Did not advance			
Aristote Ndombe	50 metre freestyle	27.88	108	Did not advance			
Aristote Ndombe	50 metre butterfly	31.51	66	Did not advance			
