= Democratic Republic of the Congo at the 2022 World Aquatics Championships =

- Flag of the Democratic Republic of the Congo
- FINA code: COD
- National federation: Federation de Natation en Republique Democratique de Congo

in Budapest, Hungary
- Competitors: 2 in 1 sport
- Medals: Gold 0 Silver 0 Bronze 0 Total 0

World Aquatics Championships appearances
- 2013; 2015–2019; 2022; 2023; 2024

Democratic Republic of the Congo competed at the 2022 World Aquatics Championships in Budapest, Hungary from 18 June to 3 July.

== Swimming ==
Swimmers from Democratic Republic of the Congo have achieved qualifying standards in the following events.

Athlete	Event	Heat		Semifinal		Final	
Athlete	Event	Time	Rank	Time	Rank	Time	Rank
Fabrice Mopama Sukasuka	Men's 50 m breaststroke	DNS					
Yves Munyu	Men's 50 m freestyle	DNS					
