= European U-23 Swimming Championships =

Annual swimming competition

The European Under 23 (or "U-23") Swimming Championships (50 m) is a biennial swimming competition for European swimmers organized by European Aquatics and held over three days. The competitor age range is from 19 to 23, and the event is designed to be a development event to aid the transition from junior to senior competition. The inaugural edition in 2023 was awarded to Dublin, Ireland.

== Format ==
Competition in the Under-23 championships will be held across three days, much shorter than a traditional continental championships which usually last a week. A special Skins event will be held for freestyle sprinters, as the event proved popular in the International Swimming League. Certain standard relays will not be held.

In addition to European nations, the Under 23 Championship rules allow non-European guest nations to be invited to increase competitiveness, at a maximum of one per continent. Swimmers from these nations will be able to win 'commemorative' medals reflecting their position in the physical race as if it was a standard non-championship meet, while the top three European swimmers will receive the championship gold, silver and bronze. As such, some events will award two silver medals, for example, one for a guest who finished second in a final, and one for the second placed European swimmer in the same race. The European swimmer is always taken to be competing in the European Championships, so does not win the lower medal they might receive in the virtual 'open' meet.

In the first edition, United States, Zimbabwe and South Africa accepted invitations to the championships. For the second edition in Samorin, Slovakia, invitations were not extend to any non European nations.

The Championships will be scheduled every two years, immediately after or before the World Aquatics Championships. From 2025, no one eligible for junior competition was allowed to compete in the Championships. In 2025, the Under-23 and Junior Championships were held back-to-back at the same venue. For 2027, the event will be included as part of the aquatics programme for the 2027 European Games, along with the senior 2027 European Aquatics Artistic Swimming Championships, the second edition of those championships to be held as part of the European Games.

== Championships ==
#	Year	Host city	Host country	Date	Events	Leading nation	Guests
1	2023	Dublin	Ireland	11-13 August	38	Ireland	South Africa; United States; Zimbabwe
2	2025	Šamorín	Slovakia	26-28 June	38	Poland	none
3	2027	Istanbul	Turkey	16 – 27 June			

== All-time medal table ==
After the 2025 championships :

Rank	Nation	Gold	Silver	Bronze	Total
1	Poland (POL)	10	7	5	22
2	Germany (GER)	10	6	3	19
3	Great Britain (GBR)	7	7	10	24
4	Ireland (IRL)	7	5	1	13
5	Greece (GRE)	7	2	6	15
6	Netherlands (NED)	5	6	4	15
7	Hungary (HUN)	4	4	7	15
8	Austria (AUT)	4	1	1	6
9	Slovenia (SLO)	4	0	2	6
10	Belgium (BEL)	3	2	0	5
11	Romania (ROU)	3	0	2	5
12	France (FRA)	2	5	9	16
13	Portugal (POR)	2	3	2	7
14	Bulgaria (BUL)	2	2	0	4
15	Israel (ISR)	2	0	4	6
16	Estonia (EST)	2	0	0	2
17	Ukraine (UKR)	1	7	3	11
18	Italy (ITA)	1	4	4	9
19	Denmark (DEN)	1	0	2	3
20	Norway (NOR)	0	3	1	4
21	Croatia (CRO)	0	2	4	6
22	Slovakia (SVK)	0	2	2	4
23	Serbia (SRB)	0	2	1	3
24	Lithuania (LTU)	0	1	2	3
25	Bosnia and Herzegovina (BIH)	0	1	0	1
25	Luxembourg (LUX)	0	1	0	1
25	Sweden (SWE)	0	1	0	1
25	Turkey (TUR)	0	1	0	1
29	Czech Republic (CZE)	0	0	2	2
30	Finland (FIN)	0	0	1	1
Totals (30 entries)		77	75	78	230
