= Paweł Juraszek =

Polish swimmer (born 1994)

Personal information
- National team: Poland
- Born: 8 October 1994 (age 31) Tel Aviv, Israel
- Height: 1.85 m (6 ft 1 in)
- Weight: 68 kg (150 lb)

Sport
- Sport: Swimming
- Strokes: Freestyle
Medal record
Men's swimming
Representing Poland
European Championships (SC)
Silver medal – second place	2019 Glasgow	4×50 m freestyle
Bronze medal – third place	2017 Copenhagen	4×50 m freestyle
Bronze medal – third place	2021 Kazan	50 m freestyle
Bronze medal – third place	2021 Kazan	4x50 m mixed freestyle relay

Paweł Juraszek (born 8 October 1994) is a Polish swimmer. He competed in the men's 50 metre freestyle event at the 2016 Summer Olympics and 2020 Summer Olympics. At the 2017 World Aquatics Championships in Budapest he finished fifth in the 50 m freestyle, setting a new national record of 21.47.
