= Stergios Bilas =

Greek swimmer (born 2001)

Personal information
- Full name: Stergios Marios Bilas
- Born: November 21, 2001 (age 24) Chalcis, Greece
- Height: 1.90 m (6 ft 3 in)

Sport
- Sport: Swimming
Medal record
Men's swimming
Representing Greece
European Championships (LC)
Gold medal – first place	2024 Belgrade	50 m butterfly
Silver medal – second place	2024 Belgrade	50 m freestyle
Bronze medal – third place	2024 Belgrade	4×100 m freestyle relay
European Championships (SC)
Bronze medal – third place	2023 Otopeni	4×50 m freestyle relay
Mediterranean Games
Silver medal – second place	2022 Oran	4×100 m freestyle relay
Silver medal – second place	2026 Taranto	4×100 m mixed medley
Bronze medal – third place	2026 Taranto	50 m butterfly
European U-23 Championships
Gold medal – first place	2023 Dublin	50 m freestyle
Gold medal – first place	2023 Dublin	50 m butterfly

Stergios Marios Bilas (born 21 November 2001) is a Greek swimmer. He competed in the men's 50 metre freestyle event at the 2024 Summer Olympics.
