= Martin Kartavi =

Israeli swimmer (born 2004)

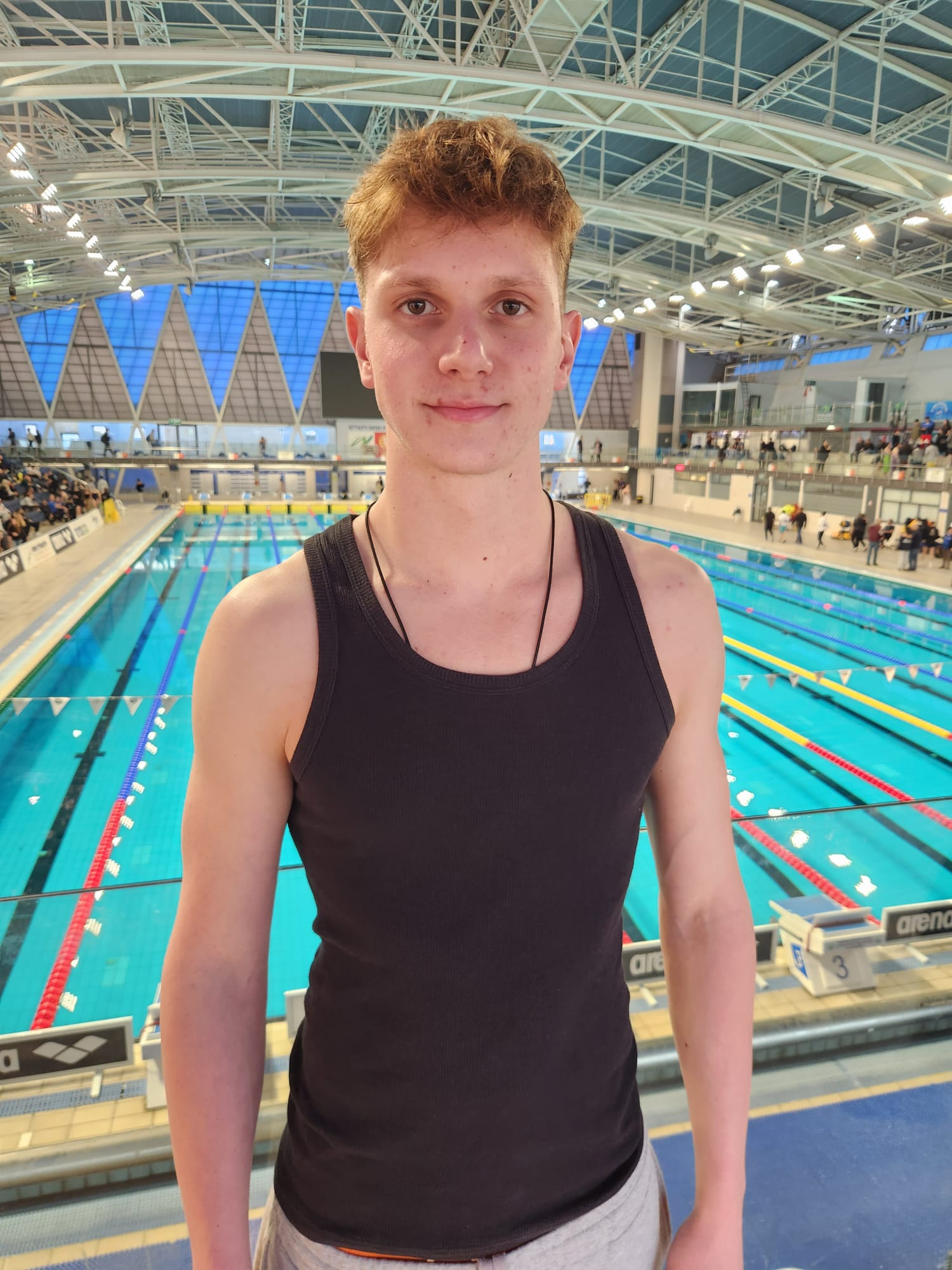
- Kartavi in 2024

Personal information
- Native name: מרטין קרטבי
- Born: March 9, 2004 (age 22) Israel
- Height: 1.91 m (6 ft 3 in)

Sport
- Sport: Swimming
Medal record
Men's swimming
Representing Israel
European Junior Championships
Bronze medal – third place	2022 Otopeni	50 m freestyle
Bronze medal – third place	2021 Rome	50 m freestyle

Martin Kartavi (Hebrew: מרטין קרטבי; born 3 September 2004) is an Israeli swimmer. He competed in the men's 50 metre freestyle event at the 2024 Summer Olympics.
