= Guinea at the 2025 World Aquatics Championships =

- Flag of Guinea
- World Aquatics code: GUI
- National federation: Fédération Guinéenne de Natation et Sauvetage

in Singapore
- Competitors: 5 in 2 sports
- Medals: Gold 0 Silver 0 Bronze 0 Total 0

World Aquatics Championships appearances
- 1973; 1975; 1978; 1982; 1986; 1991; 1994; 1998; 2001; 2003; 2005; 2007; 2009; 2011; 2013; 2015; 2017; 2019; 2022; 2023; 2024; 2025

Guinea is competing at the 2025 World Aquatics Championships in Singapore from 11 July to 3 August 2025.

== Competitors ==
The following is the list of competitors in the Championships.

Sport	Men	Women	Total
Artistic swimming	0	1	1
Swimming	2	2	4
Total	2	3	5

== Artistic swimming ==
Women

Athlete	Event	Preliminary		Final	
Athlete	Event	Points	Rank	Points	Rank
Alexandra Mansare-Traore	Solo technical	157.6750	34	Did not advance	
Alexandra Mansare-Traore	Solo free	100.2962	29	Did not advance	

== Swimming ==
Men

Athlete	Event	Heat		Semifinal		Final	
Athlete	Event	Time	Rank	Time	Rank	Time	Rank
Elhadj Diallo	50 m freestyle	26.13	96	Did not advance			
Elhadj Diallo	100 m freestyle	58.39	97	Did not advance			
Fodé Camara	50 m breaststroke	32.25	73	Did not advance			
Fodé Camara	50 m butterfly	28.17	87	Did not advance			

Women

Athlete	Event	Heat		Semifinal		Final	
Athlete	Event	Time	Rank	Time	Rank	Time	Rank
Djenabou Bah	50 m freestyle	32.96	95	Did not advance			
Djenabou Bah	100 m freestyle	1:13.41	82	Did not advance			
Marie Camara	50 m breaststroke	DQ		Did not advance			
