= Djibouti at the 2025 World Aquatics Championships =

- Flag of Djibouti
- World Aquatics code: DJI
- National federation: Fédération Djiboutienne de Natation

in Singapore
- Competitors: 1 in 1 sport
- Medals: Gold 0 Silver 0 Bronze 0 Total 0

World Aquatics Championships appearances
- 2009; 2011; 2013; 2015; 2017; 2019; 2022; 2023; 2024; 2025

Djibouti competed at the 2025 World Aquatics Championships in Singapore from 11 July to 3 August 2025.

== Competitors ==
The following is the list of competitors in the Championships.

| Sport | Men | Women | Total |
|---|---|---|---|
| Swimming | 1 | 0 | 1 |
| Total | 1 | 0 | 1 |

== Swimming ==
Men

| Athlete | Event | Heat | | Semifinal | | Final | |
| Athlete | Event | Time | Rank | Time | Rank | Time | Rank |
|---|---|---|---|---|---|---|---|
| Houmed Houssein Barkat | 100 m freestyle | 56.22 | 92 | Did not advance | | | |
| Houmed Houssein Barkat | 50 m butterfly | 27.25 | 84 | Did not advance | | | |
