= Antigua and Barbuda at the 2025 World Aquatics Championships =

- Flag of Antigua and Barbuda
- World Aquatics code: ANT
- National federation: Antigua and Barbuda Amateur Swimming Association

in Singapore
- Competitors: 4 in 1 sport
- Medals: Gold 0 Silver 0 Bronze 0 Total 0

World Aquatics Championships appearances
- 1973; 1975; 1978; 1982; 1986; 1991; 1994; 1998; 2001; 2003; 2005; 2007; 2009; 2011; 2013; 2015; 2017; 2019; 2022; 2023; 2024; 2025

Antigua and Barbuda will compete at the 2025 World Aquatics Championships in Singapore from July 11 to August 3, 2025.

== Swimming ==
Swimmers from Antigua and Barbuda have achieved qualifying standards in the following events.

Men

Athlete	Event	Heat		Semifinal		Final	
Athlete	Event	Time	Rank	Time	Rank	Time	Rank
Stefano Mitchell	50 m freestyle	23.18	57	Did not advance			
Stefano Mitchell	100 m freestyle	51.23	58	Did not advance			
Naeem Desouza	50 m butterfly	26.52	78	Did not advance			
Naeem Desouza	100 m butterfly	1:00.16	73	Did not advance			

Women

Athlete	Event	Heat		Semifinal		Final	
Athlete	Event	Time	Rank	Time	Rank	Time	Rank
Aunjelique Liddie	100 m freestyle	59.98	52	Did not advance			
Bianca Mitchell	200 m freestyle	2:11.40	43	Did not advance			
