= 2024 World Aquatics Swimming Championships (25 m) – Men's 100 metre freestyle =

Swimming competition

Men's 100 metre freestyle at the 2024 World Aquatics Swimming Championships (25 m)
- Venue: Duna Arena
- Location: Budapest, Hungary
- Dates: 11 December (heats and semifinals); 12 December (final)
- Competitors: 106 from 100 nations
- Winning time: 45.38

Medalists
gold medal	Jack Alexy	United States
silver medal	Guilherme Caribé	Brazil
bronze medal	Jordan Crooks	Cayman Islands

The men's 100 metre freestyle event at the 2024 World Aquatics Swimming Championships (25 m) was held from 11 to 12 December 2024 at the Duna Arena in Budapest, Hungary.

== Records ==
Prior to the competition, the existing world and championship records were as follows:

World record	Kyle Chalmers (AUS)	44.84	Kazan, Russia	29 October 2021
Competition record	Kyle Chalmers (AUS)	45.16	Melbourne, Australia	15 December 2022

The following records were established during the competition:

Date	Round	Name	Nationality	Time	Record
10 December	Final*	Jack Alexy	United States	45.05	CR
11 December	Heat 9	Jordan Crooks	Cayman Islands	44.95	CR

* Split from the men's 4 × 100 m freestyle relay

== Background ==
Several of the top contenders in the event chose not to compete, including Kyle Chalmers, David Popovici, Pan Zhanle, Thomas Ceccon, Hwang Sun-woo, and Tom Dean. Maxime Grousset of France held the fastest personal best in the field with a 45.41, set at the 2022 Short Course World Championships. Italy’s Alessandro Miressi had the second fastest personal best, having clocked a 45.51 en route to silver at the 2023 European Short Course Championships. Brazil’s Guilherme Caribé recorded a lifetime best of 45.78 in August 2024, while Egor Kornev, who was recently approved to compete as a neutral athlete, posted a 45.97 at the Russian Short Course Championships in November. Jordan Crooks of the Cayman Islands made the final in this event at the previous World Championships, setting a personal best of 45.55 in the semifinal. Olympic finalists in the field included Hungary’s Nándor Németh, and Americans Jack Alexy and Chris Guiliano, though only Nemeth had a prior short-course time. Dylan Carter of Trinidad and Tobago and Leonardo Deplano of Italy each entered with a best time of 46.36.

SwimSwam predicted Maxime Grousset would win, followed by Jordan Crooks in second and Guilherme Caribé in third.

== Results ==
=== Heats ===
The heats were started on 11 December at 09:23.

Rank	Heat	Lane	Name	Nationality	Time	Notes
1	9	8	Jordan Crooks	Cayman Islands	44.95	Q, CR, AM
2	10	1	Chris Guiliano	United States	45.94	Q
3	11	4	Maxime Grousset	France	46.01	Q
4	9	4	Guilherme Caribé	Brazil	46.06	Q
5	11	5	Egor Kornev	Neutral Athletes B	46.07	Q
6	11	2	Shane Ryan	Ireland	46.23	Q, NR
7	8	1	Youssef Ramadan	Egypt	46.24	Q, NR
8	9	2	Heiko Gigler	Austria	46.45	Q, NR
9	10	7	Jack Alexy	United States	46.57	Q
10	9	0	Jere Hribar	Croatia	46.60	Q
=11	8	6	Tomas Navikonis	Lithuania	46.63	Q
=11	11	3	Dylan Carter	Trinidad and Tobago	46.63	Q, WD
13	9	7	Rafael Miroslaw	Germany	46.74	Q
14	10	4	Alessandro Miressi	Italy	46.82	Q
=15	8	8	Lamar Taylor	Bahamas	46.89	Q, NR
=15	9	9	Kamil Sieradzki	Poland	46.89	Q
17	9	5	Leonardo Deplano	Italy	46.98	R
18	10	5	Nándor Németh	Hungary	47.00	R
19	11	8	Patrick Dinu	Romania	47.05	
20	7	9	Tomas Koski	Finland	47.13	NR
21	8	9	Robin Hanson	Sweden	47.18	
22	9	3	Marco Antonio Ferreira	Brazil	47.19	
23	10	3	Dmitrii Zhavoronkov	Neutral Athletes B	47.22	
=24	9	6	Wudi Liu	China	47.24	
=24	10	0	Yuri Kisil	Canada	47.24	
26	11	7	Harrison Turner	Australia	47.31	
=27	9	1	Sergio de Celis	Spain	47.47	
=27	10	9	Mikel Schreuders	Aruba	47.47	
29	11	9	Luis Domínguez	Spain	47.64	
30	11	6	Kaiya Seki	Japan	47.67	
31	7	0	Deniel Nankov	Bulgaria	47.71	
32	10	8	Matej Duša	Slovakia	47.84	
33	8	4	Bjørnar Grytnes Laskerud	Norway	47.85	
34	6	4	Simon Doueihy	Lebanon	47.91	NR
35	10	6	Edward Sommerville	Australia	47.96	
36	11	0	Velimir Stjepanović	Serbia	47.99	
37	8	3	Luong Jérémie Loïc Nino	Vietnam	48.11	NR
38	7	4	Adilbek Mussin	Kazakhstan	48.17	
39	6	3	Martin Kartavi	Israel	48.21	
40	7	8	Roman Mityukov	Switzerland	48.27	
41	11	1	Emre Gürdenli	Turkey	48.28	
=42	5	4	Diego Aranda	Uruguay	48.44	NR
=42	7	7	Konstantinos Englezakis	Greece	48.44	
44	5	5	Marwane Sebbata	Morocco	48.48	NR
45	6	2	Yin Chuen Lim	Malaysia	48.49	NR
46	8	7	Ardi Azman	Singapore	48.57	
=47	7	1	Lars Kuljus	Estonia	48.66	
=47	8	0	Daniel Gracík	Czech Republic	48.66	
49	7	2	Rafael Ponce	Peru	48.81	NR
50	6	8	Samyar Abdoli	Iran	48.89	
51	6	0	Gabriel Martinez	Honduras	48.91	
52	6	1	Javier Núñez	Dominican Republic	49.03	NR
53	7	3	Adi Mešetović	Bosnia and Herzegovina	49.05	
54	8	2	Pongpanod Trithan	Thailand	49.10	
55	8	5	Hugo Wrathall	New Zealand	49.39	
56	10	2	Ruard Van Renen	South Africa	49.43	
57	1	5	William Birkett Feraud	Ecuador	49.52	
58	7	5	Enkhtamir Batbayar	Mongolia	49.71	
59	7	6	Luka Kukhalashvili	Georgia	49.73	
60	4	2	Miguel Vasquez	Guatemala	49.79	
61	6	6	Grisi Koxhaku	Albania	49.89	
62	6	5	Adrian Vargas	Costa Rica	49.91	NR
63	5	9	Colins Obi Ebingha	Nigeria	49.96	NR
64	4	6	Jovan Jankovski	North Macedonia	50.30	
65	5	7	Musa Zhalayev	Turkmenistan	50.37	NR
66	5	2	Stefano Mitchell	Antigua and Barbuda	50.38	
=67	5	0	Aryaan Din	Pakistan	50.47	NR
=67	5	1	Hansel Mccaig	Fiji	50.47	
69	4	4	Hector Langkilde	Samoa	50.73	
70	4	3	Nixon Hernández	El Salvador	50.77	
71	4	5	Mohamad Zubaid	Kuwait	51.09	
72	4	1	Collins Saliboko	Tanzania	51.10	
73	6	9	Tendo Mukalazi	Uganda	51.20	
74	5	3	Alaa Maso	ART	51.33	
75	3	4	Israel Poppe	Guam	51.36	
76	1	4	Ismael Jair Holtuin	Suriname	51.38	
77	1	2	Adnan Al-Abdallat	Jordan	51.46	
78	3	5	Belly-Cresus Ganira	Burundi	51.49	
79	4	7	Antoine De Lapparent	Cambodia	51.52	NR
80	4	0	Mohammed Jibali	Libya	51.55	
81	4	9	Finau Ohuafi	Tonga	52.16	
82	3	2	Mohame Aan Hussain	Maldives	52.29	NR
83	3	0	Joel Ling	Brunei	52.41	
84	3	1	Mohammed Hani S Al Zaki	Saudi Arabia	52.54	NR
85	4	8	Amos Ferley	Seychelles	52.75	
86	3	3	Rony Daher	Bolivia	53.03	
87	5	8	Sidrell Williams	Jamaica	53.15	
88	1	3	Kenale Alleyne	Saint Vincent and the Grenadines	53.21	
89	3	6	Ardasher Gadoev	Tajikistan	55.06	
90	2	4	Yousif Ibrahim	Sudan	55.40	NR
91	3	8	Baritiana Andriampenomanana	Madagascar	55.69	
92	3	7	Sangay Tenzin	Bhutan	55.73	
93	3	9	Cedrick Niyibizi	Rwanda	56.38	
94	2	6	Houmed Houssein Barkat	Djibouti	56.77	NR
95	2	2	Christian Chang-Chipolina	Gibraltar	58.12	
96	2	5	Asher Banda	Malawi	58.32	
97	2	3	Elhadj N'Gnane Diallo	Guinea	58.71	
98	1	6	Phixaiyadeth Thirakul	Laos	1:00.83	
99	2	7	Ousman Jobe	Gambia	1:04.03	
100	2	1	Jolanio Guterres	Timor-Leste	1:04.39	NR
101	1	1	Jaya Corder	Marshall Islands	1:05.50	
	1	7	Thabo Motsopa	Lesotho	Did not start	
	2	0	M. Mamane Hamissou Abba	Niger	Did not start	
	2	8	Pedro Rogery	Guinea-Bissau	Did not start	
	5	6	Matthew Abeysinghe	Sri Lanka	Did not start	
	6	7	Ian Ho	Hong Kong	Did not start	

=== Semifinals ===
The semifinals were started on 11 December at 17:58.

Rank	Heat	Lane	Name	Nationality	Time	Notes
1	2	4	Jordan Crooks	Cayman Islands	45.22	Q
2	2	2	Jack Alexy	United States	45.29	Q
3	2	3	Egor Kornev	Neutral Athletes B	45.52	Q
4	2	5	Maxime Grousset	France	45.59	Q
5	2	1	Alessandro Miressi	Italy	45.69	Q
6	1	5	Guilherme Caribé	Brazil	45.86	Q
7	1	4	Chris Guiliano	United States	46.08	Q
8	2	7	Tomas Navikonis	Lithuania	46.09	Q, NR
9	1	2	Jere Hribar	Croatia	46.18	R
10	1	3	Shane Ryan	Ireland	46.24	R
11	1	8	Leonardo Deplano	Italy	46.29	
12	1	7	Rafael Miroslaw	Germany	46.33	
13	1	1	Lamar Taylor	Bahamas	46.34	NR
14	2	6	Youssef Ramadan	Egypt	46.41	
15	2	8	Kamil Sieradzki	Poland	46.43	
16	1	6	Heiko Gigler	Austria	46.46	

=== Final ===
The final was held on 12 December at 17:40.

Rank	Lane	Name	Nationality	Time	Notes
1st place, gold medalist(s)	5	Jack Alexy	United States	45.38	
2nd place, silver medalist(s)	7	Guilherme Caribé	Brazil	45.47	SA
3rd place, bronze medalist(s)	4	Jordan Crooks	Cayman Islands	45.48	
4	1	Chris Guiliano	United States	45.51	
5	3	Egor Kornev	Neutral Athletes B	45.58	
6	6	Maxime Grousset	France	45.78	
7	2	Alessandro Miressi	Italy	45.93	
8	8	Tomas Navikonis	Lithuania	46.25	
