= 2024 World Aquatics Swimming Championships (25 m) – Men's 50 metre freestyle =

Swimming competition

Men's 50 metre freestyle at the 2024 World Aquatics Swimming Championships (25 m)
- Venue: Duna Arena
- Location: Budapest, Hungary
- Dates: 14 December (heats and semifinals); 15 December (final)
- Competitors: 101 from 94 nations
- Winning time: 20.19

Medalists
gold medal	Jordan Crooks	Cayman Islands
silver medal	Guilherme Caribé	Brazil
bronze medal	Jack Alexy	United States

The men's 50 metre freestyle event at the 2024 World Aquatics Swimming Championships (25 m) was held from 14 to 15 December 2024 at the Duna Arena in Budapest, Hungary.

== Background ==
Several of the world leading swimmers in this event chose not to attend, possibly due to the 2024 World Championships and 2024 Olympics already having taken place that year. (Note: The World Championships is different from the World Championships (25 m), because the former takes place in an Olympic-size swimming pool (50 m) pool, while the latter takes place in a short course (25 m) pool.) Jordan Crooks of the Cayman Islands won the event at the previous edition of these championships, and had the fastest personal best of the field. The second fastest personal best belonged to Dylan Carter of Trinidad and Tobago, who had also won the first stage of the 2024 World Cup. South Korea's Ji Yu-chan won the event at the second and latest stage (at the time) of the World Cup. Other contenders were the Netherlands' Nyls Korstanje, Australia's Isaac Cooper and France's Maxime Grousset. Jack Alexy and Chris Guiliano of the USA were top sprinters, but lacked experience in a 25 m (short course) pool.

SwimSwam predicted Crooks would win, Ji would come second and Korstanje would come third.

== Heats ==
Twelve heats took place on 14 December, starting at 10:14.

Results
Rank	Heat	Lane	Name	Nationality	Time	Notes
1	10	1	Jordan Crooks	Cayman Islands	20.08	Q, WR
2	11	8	Jack Alexy	United States	20.69	Q
3	10	5	Nyls Korstanje	Netherlands	20.72	Q, NR
3	10	8	Chris Guiliano	United States	20.72	Q
5	12	5	Dylan Carter	Trinidad and Tobago	20.75	Q
6	10	7	Guilherme Caribé	Brazil	20.81	Q
7	10	4	Isaac Cooper	Australia	20.89	Q
8	11	6	Egor Kornev	Neutral Athletes B	20.92	Q
8	12	3	Maxime Grousset	France	20.92	Q
10	9	7	Jere Hribar	Croatia	20.94	Q
11	12	6	Leonardo Deplano	Italy	20.98	Q
12	11	3	Ian Ho	Hong Kong	21.01	Q
12	11	4	Ji Yu-chan	South Korea	21.01	Q
14	10	0	Shane Ryan	Ireland	21.07	Q, NR
15	12	4	Szebasztián Szabó	Hungary	21.14	Q
16	12	8	Heiko Gigler	Austria	21.19	Q, NR
17	12	2	Thomas Fannon	Ireland	21.25	R
18	9	1	Nikola Miljenic	Croatia	21.26	R
19	12	1	Daniel Zaitsev	Estonia	21.27	
20	10	3	Marius Kusch	Germany	21.35	
21	11	5	Lorenzo Zazzeri	Italy	21.37	
22	11	2	Matej Duša	Slovakia	21.38	
23	9	5	Martin Kartavi	Israel	21.41	
23	12	9	Meiron Amir Cheruti	Israel	21.41	
25	8	2	Bjørnar Laskerud	Norway	21.44	
26	12	0	Elias Persson	Sweden	21.45	
27	11	1	Piotr Ludwiczak	Poland	21.46	
28	7	8	Deniel Nankov	Bulgaria	21.50	NR
29	8	3	Lamar Taylor	Bahamas	21.57	
30	9	2	Mikel Schreuders	Aruba	21.60	NR
30	10	2	Ralf Tribuntsov	Estonia	21.60	
32	12	7	Masahiro Kawane	Japan	21.62	
33	7	3	David Young	Fiji	21.70	NR
34	8	0	Diego Aranda	Uruguay	21.72	NR
35	9	3	Artem Selin	Germany	21.77	
36	11	9	Miguel Pérez-Godoy	Spain	21.79	
37	9	8	Patrick Dinu	Romania	21.97	
38	8	9	Samyar Abdoli	Iran	21.98	NR
38	9	6	Simon Elias Statkevičius	Iceland	21.98	
40	7	9	Abdul Jabar Adama	Nigeria	22.03	
41	6	5	Nathaniel Thomas	Jamaica	22.06	NR
41	8	4	Julien Henx	Luxembourg	22.06	
41	8	6	Adi Mešetović	Bosnia and Herzegovina	22.06	
44	7	7	Chuang Mu-lun	Chinese Taipei	22.07	
45	7	4	Javier Núñez	Dominican Republic	22.08	
46	7	6	Gleb Kovalenya	Kazakhstan	22.09	
47	11	0	Orhan Dine Moreira	Benin	22.13	NR
48	9	4	Jack Hendy	New Zealand	22.18	
49	7	2	Marwane Sebbata	Morocco	22.20	
50	10	9	Zhao Jiayue	China	22.28	
51	7	1	Gabriel Martínez	Honduras	22.35	NR
52	8	8	Luong Jérémie Loïc Nino	Vietnam	22.36	
53	1	5	William Birkett	Ecuador	22.38	
54	8	7	Lim Yin Chuen	Malaysia	22.44	
55	8	1	Adrián Vargas	Costa Rica	22.52	NR
56	7	5	Pongpanod Trithan	Thailand	22.68	
57	6	3	Hector Langkilde	Samoa	22.71	NR
58	6	8	Musa Zhalayev	Turkmenistan	22.77	NR
59	7	0	Tendo Mukalazi	Uganda	22.93	NR
60	5	5	Miguel Vásquez	Guatemala	22.94	=NR
61	6	4	Adam Moncherry	Seychelles	22.96	NR
62	5	2	Reidi Resuli	Albania	22.99	
63	6	6	Nixon Hernández	El Salvador	23.05	NR
64	6	9	Ismael Jair Holtuin	Suriname	23.17	
65	5	7	Nikolass Deičmans	Latvia	23.19	
66	6	7	Tameea El-Hamayda	Qatar	23.22	
67	5	1	Finau Ohuafi	Tonga	23.26	
68	6	1	Antoine De Lapparent	Cambodia	23.27	NR
69	5	4	Mohamad Zubaid	Kuwait	23.30	
70	5	6	Stephen Nyoike	Kenya	23.31	
71	5	3	Mohamed Aan Hussain	Maldives	23.35	NR
72	2	2	Christien Kelly	Barbados	23.56	
73	6	0	Belly-Cresus Ganira	Burundi	23.57	
74	4	5	Meshal Al-Kulaibi	Oman	23.96	
75	6	2	Alaa Maso	ART	23.98	
76	2	0	Daniil Mistriukov	Kyrgyzstan	24.05	
77	1	4	Kenale Alleyne	Saint Vincent and the Grenadines	24.10	
78	4	4	Kazuumi Nestor	Palau	24.20	NR
79	4	6	Taiyo Akimaru	Northern Mariana Islands	24.40	
80	2	9	Kim Ryong-hyon	North Korea	24.42	
81	5	0	Ardasher Gadoev	Tajikistan	24.58	
82	4	7	Ethan Hazell	Saint Lucia	24.76	
83	5	9	Ajal Kaji Tamrakar	Nepal	24.90	
84	5	8	Cedrick Niyibizi	Rwanda	24.94	
85	4	0	Houmed Houssein Barkat	Djibouti	25.09	NR
86	4	3	Yousif Ibrahim	Sudan	25.17	NR
87	4	8	Michael Mponezya Joseph	Tanzania	25.18	
88	4	1	Haziq Samil	Brunei	25.31	
89	3	2	Nigel Fontenelle	Sint Maarten	25.43	
90	4	9	Camil Doua	Mauritania	25.54	
91	3	5	Ailton Lima	Cape Verde	25.67	
92	3	4	Asher Banda	Malawi	25.75	
93	2	6	Claudio Yelegou	Cameroon	26.09	
94	4	2	Sangay Tenzin	Bhutan	26.55	
95	3	3	Elhadj N'Gnane Diallo	Guinea	26.79	
96	3	6	Ousman Jobe	Gambia	26.82	
97	1	3	Phixaiyadeth Thirakul	Laos	27.08	
98	3	9	Leo Lebot	Vanuatu	27.38	
99	2	7	Jaya Corder	Marshall Islands	27.64	
100	2	4	Jolanio Guterres	Timor-Leste	28.27	NR
	9	0	Yuri Kisil	Canada	Disqualified	
	2	1	Yusuf Nasser	Yemen	Did not start	
	2	3	Thabo Motsopa	Lesotho	Did not start	
	2	5	Marouane Mamane Hamissou Abba	Niger	Did not start	
	2	8	Jacques Ngoie Kazadi	Democratic Republic of the Congo	Did not start	
	3	0	Pedro Rogery	Guinea-Bissau	Did not start	
	3	1	Magnim Jordano Daou	Togo	Did not start	
	3	7	Fahim Anwari	Afghanistan	Did not start	
	3	8	Surafel Geremew Asfaw	Ethiopia	Did not start	
	8	5	Nándor Németh	Hungary	Did not start	
	10	6	Noè Ponti	Switzerland	Did not start	
	11	7	Emre Sakçı	Turkey	Did not start	

== Semifinals ==
Two semifinals took place on 14 December, starting at 18:21.

Results
Rank	Heat	Lane	Name	Nationality	Time	Notes
1	2	4	Jordan Crooks	Cayman Islands	19.90	Q, WR
2	1	4	Jack Alexy	United States	20.51	Q
3	1	2	Guilherme Caribé	Brazil	20.59	Q
4	2	5	Nyls Korstanje	Netherlands	20.63	Q, NR
5	2	6	Egor Kornev	Neutral Athletes B	20.75	Q
6	1	3	Maxime Grousset	France	20.78	Q
7	2	3	Chris Guiliano	United States	20.79	Q
8	1	8	Ji Yu-chan	South Korea	20.80	Q, =AS
9	1	5	Dylan Carter	Trinidad and Tobago	20.82	R
10	2	7	Leonardo Deplano	Italy	20.83	R
11	2	2	Ian Ho	Hong Kong	20.85	NR
12	1	1	Jere Hribar	Croatia	20.88	
12	1	6	Isaac Cooper	Australia	20.88	
14	2	1	Heiko Gigler	Austria	21.06	NR
15	1	7	Szebasztián Szabó	Hungary	21.07	
16	2	8	Shane Ryan	Ireland	21.28	

== Final ==
The final was held on 15 December at 17:39.

Results
Rank	Lane	Name	Nationality	Time	Notes
1st place, gold medalist(s)	4	Jordan Crooks	Cayman Islands	20.19	
2nd place, silver medalist(s)	3	Guilherme Caribé	Brazil	20.57	
3rd place, bronze medalist(s)	5	Jack Alexy	United States	20.61	
4	1	Chris Guiliano	United States	20.78	
5	6	Nyls Korstanje	Netherlands	20.79	
6	2	Egor Kornev	Neutral Athletes B	20.81	
7	7	Maxime Grousset	France	20.90	
8	8	Ji Yu-chan	South Korea	20.91	
