= Swimming at the 2025 World Aquatics Championships – Men's 100 metre freestyle =

Men's 100 metre freestyle at the 2025 World Aquatics Championships
- Venue: World Aquatics Championships Arena
- Location: Singapore Sports Hub, Kallang
- Dates: 30 July (heats and semifinals); 31 July (final)
- Competitors: 110 from 102 nations
- Winning time: 46.51 CR

Medalists
gold medal	David Popovici	Romania
silver medal	Jack Alexy	United States
bronze medal	Kyle Chalmers	Australia

The men's 100 metre freestyle event at the 2025 World Aquatics Championships was held from 30 to 31 July 2025 at the World Aquatics Championships Arena at the Singapore Sports Hub in Kallang, Singapore.

== Background ==
Seven of the eight 2024 Olympic finalists were competing, including World Record holder Pan Zhanle of China and Romania’s David Popovici. Pan broke the World Record twice in 2024, setting it at 46.40 seconds, and he won the event at the Olympics and 2024 World Championships, while Popovici ranked second all-time after posting a time of 46.71 at the 2025 European U23 Championships.

Australia’s Kyle Chalmers, the 2023 World champion, had swum 47.27 in 2025 and had improved his front-end speed. Brazil’s Guilherme Caribé ranked third in the world with 47.10. Americans Jack Alexy and Patrick Sammon qualified with times of 46.99 and 47.47 respectively, and both had swum in several major meets in 2025. Egor Kornev of Russia, representing the Neutral Athletes B team; Maxime Grousset of France; and Matt Richards of Great Britain were also key contenders. Josha Salchow of Germany, who reached the final at the 2024 Olympics, was also competing. The field included five of the top ten swimmers in history and six swimmers who had swum under 47.5 in 2025.

== Qualification ==
Each National Federation was permitted to enter a maximum of two qualified athletes in each individual event, but they could do so only if both of them had attained the "A" standard qualification time at approved qualifying events. For this event, the "A" standard qualification time was 48.34 seconds. Federations could enter one athlete into the event if they met the "B" standard qualification time. For this event, the "B" standard qualification time was 50.03 seconds. Athletes could also enter the event if they had met an "A" or "B" standard in a different event and their Federation had not entered anyone else. Additional considerations applied to Federations who had few swimmers enter through the standard qualification times. Federations in this category could at least enter two men and two women to the competition, all of whom could enter into up to two events.

Top 10 fastest qualification times (Note: Only including swimmers who were on the start list for this event)
Swimmer	Country	Time	Competition
Pan Zhanle	China	46.40	2024 Summer Olympics
Jack Alexy	United States	46.99	2025 United States Championships
Guilherme Caribé	Brazil	47.10	2025 Brazilian Championships
Kyle Chalmers	Australia	47.27	2025 Bergen Swim Festival
David Popovici	Romania	47.30	2025 Romanian Championships
Maxime Grousset	France	47.33	2024 French Elite Championships
Egor Kornev	Neutral Athletes B	47.42	2025 Russian Championships
Patrick Sammon	United States	47.47	2025 United States Championships
Nándor Németh	Hungary	47.49	2024 European Championships
Flynn Southam	Australia	47.69	2025 Australian Trials

== Records ==
Prior to the competition, the existing world and championship records were as follows.

World record	Pan Zhanle (CHN)	46.40	Paris, France	31 July 2024
Competition record	Pan Zhanle (CHN)	46.80	Doha, Qatar	11 February 2024

The following new records were set during this competition.

Date	Event	Name	Nationality	Time	Record
31 July	Final	David Popovici	Romania	46.51	CR

== Heats ==
The heats took place on 30 July at 10:22.

Rank	Heat	Lane	Swimmer	Nation	Time	Notes
1	11	5	David Popovici	Romania	47.41	Q
2	12	5	Kyle Chalmers	Australia	47.48	Q
3	12	3	Egor Kornev	Neutral Athletes B	47.51	Q
4	12	6	Flynn Southam	Australia	47.73	Q
5	10	5	Maxime Grousset	France	47.84	Q
6	12	4	Pan Zhanle	China	47.86	Q
7	10	6	Matt Richards	Great Britain	47.89	Q
8	12	2	Hwang Sun-woo	South Korea	47.94	Q
9	11	3	Patrick Sammon	United States	48.04	Q
10	10	3	Nándor Németh	Hungary	48.07	Q
10	11	4	Jack Alexy	United States	48.07	Q
12	10	8	Manuel Frigo	Italy	48.08	Q
13	11	6	Josha Salchow	Germany	48.13	Q
14	12	9	Luca Hoek	Spain	48.23	Q, NR
15	10	4	Guilherme Caribé	Brazil	48.27	Q
16	12	7	Rafael Fente-Damers	France	48.33	Q
17	11	8	Jere Hribar	Croatia	48.34	
18	10	0	Ruslan Gaziev	Canada	48.41	
19	12	8	Andrey Minakov	Neutral Athletes B	48.48	
20	11	0	Kamil Sieradzki	Poland	48.49	
21	11	2	Kim Young-beom	South Korea	48.50	
22	9	6	Lamar Taylor	Bahamas	48.52	NR
23	11	7	Jacob Mills	Great Britain	48.54	
24	9	2	Sander Kiær Sørensen	Norway	48.65	NR
24	9	5	Mikel Schreuders	Aruba	48.65	
26	11	1	Carlos D'Ambrosio	Italy	48.67	
27	10	2	Velimir Stjepanović	Serbia	48.83	
27	12	1	Wang Haoyu	China	48.83	
29	11	9	Nikoli Blackman	Trinidad and Tobago	48.86	
30	9	1	Daniel Krichevsky	Israel	48.88	
31	9	7	Robin Hanson	Sweden	48.97	
32	12	0	Heiko Gigler	Austria	49.05	
33	9	3	Ralph Daleiden Ciuferri	Luxembourg	49.08	
34	10	9	Jorge Iga	Mexico	49.17	
35	8	6	Oliver Søgaard-Andersen	Denmark	49.18	
36	9	9	Ali Sayed	Qatar	49.49	
37	8	4	Evan Bailey	Ireland	49.52	
38	9	8	Jonathan Tan	Singapore	49.62	
39	8	3	Tomas Koski	Finland	49.67	
40	8	7	Adilbek Mussin	Kazakhstan	49.75	
41	7	5	Jānis Dzirkalis	Latvia	49.86	
42	7	0	Marwane Sebbata	Morocco	50.04	NR
42	7	6	Leo Nolles	Uruguay	50.04	
44	7	7	Kenan Dračić	Bosnia and Herzegovina	50.06	
45	8	1	Gabriel Martínez	Honduras	50.07	
46	9	0	Kaloyan Bratanov	Bulgaria	50.20	
47	8	5	Vladyslav Bukhov	Ukraine	50.43	
48	7	4	Alex Ahtiainen	Estonia	50.71	
49	7	8	Matthieu Seye	Senegal	50.76	
50	8	8	Khiew Hoe Yean	Malaysia	50.77	
51	6	6	Ian Ho	Hong Kong	50.79	
52	7	2	Batbayaryn Enkhtamir	Mongolia	50.84	
53	8	9	Javier Núñez	Dominican Republic	50.87	
54	7	3	Yousuf Al-Matrooshi	United Arab Emirates	50.98	
55	8	2	Matej Duša	Slovakia	51.00	
56	2	4	William Birkett	Ecuador	51.02	
57	6	5	Antoine Destang	Saint Lucia	51.11	
58	7	9	Stefano Mitchell	Antigua and Barbuda	51.23	
59	7	1	Harry Stacey	Ghana	51.43	
60	6	4	Adrian Eichler	Philippines	51.52	
61	6	1	Colins Obi Ebingha	Nigeria	51.55	
62	6	7	Aryaan Din	Pakistan	51.65	
63	1	5	Cory Werrett	Zimbabwe	51.93	
64	5	4	Levon Kocharyan	Armenia	52.21	
64	6	9	Omar Abbass	Syria	52.21	
66	6	2	Musa Zhalayev	Turkmenistan	52.29	
67	6	3	Kyle Abeysinghe	Sri Lanka	52.36	
68	5	5	Andrey Villarreal	Panama	52.39	
69	2	6	Rohan Shrearer	Cape Verde	52.45	NR
70	8	0	Dulyawat Kaewsriyong	Thailand	52.68	
71	6	0	Tendo Mukalazi	Uganda	52.82	
72	2	8	Erick Blandón	Nicaragua	53.01	
73	5	6	Mohammed Jibali	Libya	53.09	
74	6	8	Collins Saliboko	Tanzania	53.10	
75	3	0	Matin Balsini	Athlete Refugee Team	53.62	
76	5	1	Jose Canjulo	Namibia	53.71	
77	5	8	Finau Ohuafi	Tonga	53.76	
78	5	0	Mohamed Aan Hussain	Maldives	53.80	NR
79	5	7	Israel Poppe	Guam	53.91	
80	5	3	Mahmoud Abu Gharbieh	Palestine	54.02	
81	4	5	Luka Smit	Malawi	54.16	
82	4	7	Khaled Alotaibi	Kuwait	54.31	
83	2	3	Ahmed Al-Mutairy	Iraq	54.37	
84	4	4	Phone Pyae Han	Myanmar	54.43	
85	1	4	Ervin Shrestha	Nepal	54.81	
86	2	2	Ali Adel Al-Hasni	Oman	55.08	
87	3	1	Pieter Sok Kha Vanoosten	Cambodia	55.33	
88	5	2	Josh Tarere	Papua New Guinea	55.34	
89	5	9	Ardasher Gadoev	Tajikistan	55.42	
90	4	6	Katerson Moya	Federated States of Micronesia	55.44	NR
91	4	3	Haziq Samil	Brunei	56.07	
92	4	8	Houmed Houssein Barkat	Djibouti	56.22	NR
93	4	0	Charlie Gibbons	Palau	57.23	
94	4	1	Yousif Ibrahim	Sudan	57.35	
95	2	0	Janel Yondu Tati	Angola	57.41	
96	4	2	Sangay Tenzin	Bhutan	57.43	
97	4	9	Elhadj N'Gnane Diallo	Guinea	58.39	NR
98	3	6	Leo Lebot	Vanuatu	59.58	
99	2	5	Jacob Mugisha	Democratic Republic of the Congo	1:00.17	
100	2	1	Kevin Kaiga	Rwanda	1:01.68	
101	3	4	Hadji Hassane	Comoros	1:02.55	
102	2	7	Claudio Yelegou	Cameroon	1:02.86	
103	3	3	Pedro Rogery	Guinea-Bissau	1:03.93	
104	2	9	Mustafa Hashim	Somalia	1:05.01	
105	3	5	Jolanio Guterres	Timor-Leste	1:07.42	
106	3	9	Brenton Naka	Solomon Islands	1:07.59	
107	3	2	Marouane Mamane Hamissou Abba	Niger	1:08.18	
108	3	7	Sekou Alioune Badara Traore	Mali	1:09.78	
109	1	3	Alfousseni Fofana	Ivory Coast	1:14.15	
110	3	8	Mokheseng Mphofe	Lesotho	1:23.43	
	9	4	Diogo Ribeiro	Portugal	Did not start	
	10	1	Sean Niewold	Netherlands	Did not start	
	10	7	Danas Rapšys	Lithuania	Did not start	

== Semifinals ==
The semifinals took place on 30 July at 19:26.

Rank	Heat	Lane	Swimmer	Nation	Time	Notes
1	2	7	Jack Alexy	United States	46.81	Q, AM
2	2	4	David Popovici	Romania	46.84	Q
3	2	5	Egor Kornev	Neutral Athletes B	47.29	Q
4	1	4	Kyle Chalmers	Australia	47.36	Q
5	2	3	Maxime Grousset	France	47.39	Q
6	2	6	Matt Richards	Great Britain	47.59	Q
7	2	2	Patrick Sammon	United States	47.62	Q
8	2	8	Guilherme Caribé	Brazil	47.64	Q
9	1	2	Nándor Németh	Hungary	47.72	
10	1	3	Pan Zhanle	China	47.81	
11	2	1	Josha Salchow	Germany	47.88	
12	1	5	Flynn Southam	Australia	47.90	
13	1	6	Hwang Sun-woo	South Korea	47.94	
14	1	1	Luca Hoek	Spain	48.04	NR
15	1	7	Manuel Frigo	Italy	48.18	
16	1	8	Rafael Fente-Damers	France	48.38	

== Final ==
The final took place on 31 July at 19:21.

Rank	Lane	Name	Nationality	Time	Notes
1st place, gold medalist(s)	5	David Popovici	Romania	46.51	CR, ER
2nd place, silver medalist(s)	4	Jack Alexy	United States	46.92	
3rd place, bronze medalist(s)	6	Kyle Chalmers	Australia	47.17	
4	8	Guilherme Caribé	Brazil	47.35	
5	3	Egor Kornev	Neutral Athletes B	47.51	
6	1	Patrick Sammon	United States	47.58	
7	2	Maxime Grousset	France	47.59	
8	7	Matt Richards	Great Britain	47.74	
