= Antigua and Barbuda at the 2024 World Aquatics Championships =

- Flag of Antigua and Barbuda
- FINA code: ANT
- National federation: Antigua and Barbuda Amateur Swimming Association

in Doha, Qatar
- Competitors: 4 in 1 sport
- Medals: Gold 0 Silver 0 Bronze 0 Total 0

World Aquatics Championships appearances
- 1973; 1975; 1978; 1982; 1986; 1991; 1994; 1998; 2001; 2003; 2005; 2007; 2009; 2011; 2013; 2015; 2017; 2019; 2022; 2023; 2024

Antigua and Barbuda has competed at the 2024 World Aquatics Championships in Doha, Qatar from 2 to 18 February.

== Swimming ==
Swimmers from Antigua and Barbuda have achieved qualifying standards in the following events.

Men

Athlete	Event	Heat		Semifinal		Final	
Athlete	Event	Time	Rank	Time	Rank	Time	Rank
Stefano Mitchell	50 m freestyle	23.48	51	Did not advance			
Stefano Mitchell	100 m freestyle	52.86	75	Did not advance			
Jadon Wuilliez	50 m breaststroke	28.35	27	Did not advance			
Jadon Wuilliez	100 m breaststroke	1:02.54	38	Did not advance			

Women

Athlete	Event	Heat		Semifinal		Final	
Athlete	Event	Time	Rank	Time	Rank	Time	Rank
Aunjelique Liddie	50 m freestyle	27.38	57	Did not advance			
Aunjelique Liddie	100 m freestyle	59.78 NR	43	Did not advance			
Ellie Shaw	50 m breaststroke	32.73 NR	31	Did not advance			
Ellie Shaw	100 m breaststroke	1:15.20	43	Did not advance			
