= Djibouti at the 2023 World Aquatics Championships =

- Flag of Djibouti
- World Aquatics code: DJI
- National federation: Fédération Djiboutienne de Natation

in Fukuoka, Japan
- Competitors: 2 in 1 sport
- Medals: Gold 0 Silver 0 Bronze 0 Total 0

World Aquatics Championships appearances
- 2009; 2011; 2013; 2015; 2017; 2019; 2022; 2023; 2024; 2025

Djibouti competed at the 2023 World Aquatics Championships in Fukuoka, Japan from 14 to 30 July.

== Swimming ==
Djibouti entered 2 swimmers.

Men

Athlete	Event	Heat		Semifinal		Final	
Athlete	Event	Time	Rank	Time	Rank	Time	Rank
Houmed Houssein Barkat	50 metre freestyle	26.76	99	Did not advance			
Houmed Houssein Barkat	50 metre butterfly	29.02	80	Did not advance			

Women

Athlete	Event	Heat		Semifinal		Final	
Athlete	Event	Time	Rank	Time	Rank	Time	Rank
Nina Amison	50 metre freestyle	Did not start					
Nina Amison	50 metre breaststroke	49.61	50	Did not advance			
