= Antigua and Barbuda at the 2023 World Aquatics Championships =

- Flag of Antigua and Barbuda
- FINA code: ANT
- National federation: Antigua and Barbuda Amateur Swimming Association

in Fukuoka, Japan
- Competitors: 4 in 1 sport
- Medals: Gold 0 Silver 0 Bronze 0 Total 0

World Aquatics Championships appearances
- 1973; 1975; 1978; 1982; 1986; 1991; 1994; 1998; 2001; 2003; 2005; 2007; 2009; 2011; 2013; 2015; 2017; 2019; 2022; 2023; 2024

Antigua and Barbuda competed at the 2023 World Aquatics Championships in Fukuoka, Japan from 14 to 30 July.

== Swimming ==
Swimmers from Antigua and Barbuda have achieved qualifying standards in the following events.

Men

| Athlete | Event | Heat | | Semifinal | | Final | |
| Athlete | Event | Time | Rank | Time | Rank | Time | Rank |
|---|---|---|---|---|---|---|---|
| Stefano Mitchell | 50 m freestyle | 23.21 | 56 | Did not advance | | | |
| Stefano Mitchell | 100 m freestyle | 51.46 | 65 | Did not advance | | | |
| Jadon Wuilliez | 50 m breaststroke | 28.09 | 30 | Did not advance | | | |
| Jadon Wuilliez | 100 m breaststroke | 1:02.10 NR | 37 | Did not advance | | | |

Women

| Athlete | Event | Heat | | Semifinal | | Final | |
| Athlete | Event | Time | Rank | Time | Rank | Time | Rank |
|---|---|---|---|---|---|---|---|
| Aunjelique Liddie | 50 m freestyle | 27.86 | 62 | Did not advance | | | |
| Aunjelique Liddie | 100 m freestyle | 1:01.07 | 50 | Did not advance | | | |
| Bianca Mitchell | 200 m freestyle | 2:13.24 | 57 | Did not advance | | | |
| Bianca Mitchell | 50 metre butterfly | 29.97 | 51 | Did not advance | | | |

Mixed

| Athlete | Event | Heat | | Final | |
| Athlete | Event | Time | Rank | Time | Rank |
|---|---|---|---|---|---|
| Stefano Mitchell; Jadon Wuilliez; Bianca Mitchell; Aunjelique Liddie | 4 × 100 m freestyle relay | 3:45.38 | 28 | Did not advance | |
