= Antigua and Barbuda at the 2015 World Aquatics Championships =

- Flag of Antigua and Barbuda
- FINA code: ANT
- National federation: Antigua and Barbuda Amateur Swimming Association

in Kazan, Russia
- Competitors: 4 in 1 sport
- Medals: Gold 0 Silver 0 Bronze 0 Total 0

World Aquatics Championships appearances
- 1973; 1975; 1978; 1982; 1986; 1991; 1994; 1998; 2001; 2003; 2005; 2007; 2009; 2011; 2013; 2015; 2017; 2019; 2022; 2023; 2024

Antigua and Barbuda competed at the 2015 World Aquatics Championships in Kazan, Russia from 24 July to 9 August.

== Swimming ==
Swimmers from Antigua and Barbuda have achieved qualifying standards in the following events (up to a maximum of 2 swimmers in each event at the A-standard entry time, and 1 at the B-standard):

Men

Athlete	Event	Heat		Semifinal		Final	
Athlete	Event	Time	Rank	Time	Rank	Time	Rank
Noah Mascoll-Gomes	50 m freestyle	24.79	71	did not advance			
Noah Mascoll-Gomes	50 m backstroke	28.69	56	did not advance			
Stefano Mitchell	100 m freestyle	56.34	96	did not advance			
Stefano Mitchell	50 m butterfly	27.72	60	did not advance			

Women

Athlete	Event	Heat		Semifinal		Final	
Athlete	Event	Time	Rank	Time	Rank	Time	Rank
Makaela Holowchak	400 m freestyle	4:47.77	49	—		did not advance	
Makaela Holowchak	800 m freestyle	9:37.68	42	—		did not advance	
Samantha Roberts	100 m freestyle	1:01.38	77	did not advance			
Samantha Roberts	50 m butterfly	30.16	53	did not advance			
