= Antigua and Barbuda at the 2022 World Aquatics Championships =

- Flag of Antigua and Barbuda
- FINA code: ANT
- National federation: Antigua and Barbuda Amateur Swimming Association

in Budapest, Hungary
- Competitors: 4 in 1 sport
- Medals: Gold 0 Silver 0 Bronze 0 Total 0

World Aquatics Championships appearances
- 1973; 1975; 1978; 1982; 1986; 1991; 1994; 1998; 2001; 2003; 2005; 2007; 2009; 2011; 2013; 2015; 2017; 2019; 2022; 2023; 2024

Antigua and Barbuda competed at the 2022 World Aquatics Championships in Budapest, Hungary from 18 June to 3 July.

== Swimming ==
Swimmers from Antigua and Barbuda have achieved qualifying standards in the following events.

Athlete	Event	Heat		Semifinal		Final	
Athlete	Event	Time	Rank	Time	Rank	Time	Rank
Noah Mascoll-Gomes	Men's 200 m freestyle	1:53.30	48	did not advance			
Noah Mascoll-Gomes	Men's 400 m freestyle	4:02.93	37	—		did not advance	
Stefano Mitchell	Men's 50 m freestyle	23.52	57	did not advance			
Stefano Mitchell	Men's 100 m freestyle	52.02	64	did not advance			
Olivia Fuller	Women's 50 m freestyle	27.81	49	did not advance			
Olivia Fuller	Women's 100 m freestyle	1:00.42	39	did not advance			
Bianca Mitchell	Women's 200 m freestyle	2:13.84	34	did not advance			
Bianca Mitchell	Women's 400 m freestyle	4:45.89	31	—		did not advance	
