= Guinea at the 2024 World Aquatics Championships =

- Flag of Guinea
- FINA code: GUI
- National federation: Fédération Guinéenne de Natation et Sauvetage

in Doha, Qatar
- Competitors: 5 in 2 sports
- Medals: Gold 0 Silver 0 Bronze 0 Total 0

World Aquatics Championships appearances
- 1973; 1975; 1978; 1982; 1986; 1991; 1994; 1998; 2001; 2003; 2005; 2007; 2009; 2011; 2013; 2015; 2017; 2019; 2022; 2023; 2024

Guinea competed at the 2024 World Aquatics Championships in Doha, Qatar from 2 to 18 February.

== Competitors ==
The following is the list of competitors in the Championships.

Sport	Men	Women	Total
Artistic swimming	0	1	1
Swimming	2	2	4
Total	2	3	5

== Artistic swimming ==
Women

Athlete	Event	Preliminaries		Final	
Athlete	Event	Points	Rank	Points	Rank
Alexandra Mansaré-Traoré	Solo technical routine	129.1199	28	Did not advance	
Alexandra Mansaré-Traoré	Solo free routine	95.7020	30	Did not advance	

== Swimming ==
Guinea entered 4 swimmers.

Men

Athlete	Event	Heat		Semifinal		Final	
Athlete	Event	Time	Rank	Time	Rank	Time	Rank
Fode Amara Camara	50 metre freestyle	27.44	102	Did not advance			
Fode Amara Camara	100 metre breaststroke	1:16.17	73	Did not advance			
Elhadj N'Gnane Diallo	100 metre freestyle	1:01.68	98	Did not advance			
Elhadj N'Gnane Diallo	100 metre butterfly	1:03.53	64	Did not advance			

Women

Athlete	Event	Heat		Semifinal		Final	
Athlete	Event	Time	Rank	Time	Rank	Time	Rank
Djenabou Jolie Bah	50 metre freestyle	31.93	98	Did not advance			
Mariama Touré	50 metre breaststroke	40.83	39	Did not advance			
Mariama Touré	100 metre breaststroke	1:37.98	53	Did not advance			
