= Djibouti at the 2019 World Aquatics Championships =

- Flag of Djibouti
- FINA code: DJI
- National federation: Fédération Djiboutienne de Natation

in Gwangju, South Korea
- Competitors: 3 in 1 sport
- Medals: Gold 0 Silver 0 Bronze 0 Total 0

World Aquatics Championships appearances
- 2009; 2011; 2013; 2015; 2017; 2019; 2022; 2023; 2024

Djibouti competed at the 2019 World Aquatics Championships in Gwangju, South Korea from 12 to 28 July.

== Swimming ==
Djibouti entered three swimmers.

Men

Athlete	Event	Heat		Semifinal		Final	
Athlete	Event	Time	Rank	Time	Rank	Time	Rank
Houssein Gaber Ibrahim	100 m freestyle	1:03.54	116	did not advance			
Houssein Gaber Ibrahim	50 m butterfly	31.74	91	did not advance			
Houmed Houssein Barkat	50 m freestyle	DSQ		did not advance			
Houmed Houssein Barkat	50 m backstroke	37.03	71	did not advance			

Women

Athlete	Event	Heat		Semifinal		Final	
Athlete	Event	Time	Rank	Time	Rank	Time	Rank
Safia Houssein Barkat	50 m freestyle	37.16	99	did not advance			
Safia Houssein Barkat	50 m breaststroke	49.56	55	did not advance			
