= Swimming at the 2023 Pan American Games – Men's 100 metre freestyle =

Men's 100 metre freestyle at the 2023 Pan American Games
- Venue: Aquatic Center
- Date: October 23, 2023
- Competitors: 31 from 24 nations

Medalists
Gold medal	Guilherme Caribé	Brazil
Silver medal	Brooks Curry	United States
Silver medal	Jonny Kulow	United States

The men's 100 metre freestyle competition of the swimming events at the 2023 Pan American Games were held on October 23, 2023, at the Aquatic Center in Santiago, Chile.

== Records ==
Prior to this competition, the existing world and Pan American Games records were as follows:

World record	David Popovici (ROM)	46.86	Rome, Italy	August 13, 2022
Pan American Games record	César Cielo Filho (BRA)	47.84	Guadalajara, Mexico	October 16, 2011

== Results ==
KEY:	QA	Qualified for A final	QB	Qualified for B final	GR	Games record	NR	National record	PB	Personal best	SB	Seasonal best	WD	Withdrew

=== Heats ===
The first round was held on October 23.

Rank	Heat	Lane	Name	Nationality	Time	Notes
1	3	5	Jonny Kulow	United States	48.49	QA
2	2	4	Guilherme Caribé	Brazil	48.63	QA
3	4	4	Marcelo Chierighini	Brazil	48.64	QA
4	3	4	Brooks Curry	United States	48.65	QA
5	4	6	Andres Dupont	Mexico	48.86	QA
6	3	3	Breno Correia	Brazil	49.05	QB
7	4	3	Jorge Iga	Mexico	49.25	QA
8	2	5	Javier Acevedo	Canada	49.26	QA
9	2	3	Alberto Mestre	Venezuela	49.28	QA
10	2	6	Guido Buscaglia	Argentina	49.65	QB
11	4	2	Matias Santiso	Argentina	49.68	QB
12	3	6	Edouard Fullum-Huot	Canada	49.76	QB
13	4	5	Mikel Schreuders	Aruba	49.88	QB
14	4	7	Ben Hockin	Paraguay	50.69	QB
15	3	7	Leo Nolles	Uruguay	50.79	QB
16	2	2	Lamar Taylor	Bahamas	50.95	WD
17	3	2	Nikoli Blackman	Trinidad and Tobago	51.01	QB
18	2	1	Isaac Beitia	Panama	51.32	
19	3	8	Joaquín Vargas	Peru	51.72	
20	4	1	Gabriel Martinez	Honduras	52.00	
21	3	1	Jayhan Odlum-Smith	Saint Lucia	52.01	
22	1	4	Benjamín Schnapp	Chile	52.02	
23	2	7	James Allison	Cayman Islands	52.05	
24	1	3	Elías Ardiles	Chile	52.51	
25	1	5	Miguel Vásquez	Independent Athletes Team	52.52	
26	1	6	Nixon Hernández	El Salvador	52.58	
27	2	8	Sidrell Williams	Jamaica	52.74	
28	4	8	Stefano Mitchell	Antigua and Barbuda	52.86	
29	1	7	Nector Segovia	El Salvador	53.01	
30	1	2	Irvin Hoost	Suriname	53.37	
31	1	1	Gerald Hernandez	Nicaragua	54.52	

=== Final B ===
The B final was also held on October 23.

Rank	Lane	Name	Nationality	Time	Notes
9	6	Edouard Fullum-Huot	Canada	49.33	
10	2	Mikel Schreuders	Aruba	49.69	
11	5	Guido Buscaglia	Argentina	49.93	
12	3	Matias Santiso	Argentina	49.99	
13	4	Breno Correia	Brazil	50.19	
14	8	Nikoli Blackman	Trinidad and Tobago	50.81	
15	7	Ben Hockin	Paraguay	50.97	
16	1	Leo Nolles	Uruguay	50.99	

=== Final A ===
The A final was also held on October 23.

Rank	Lane	Name	Nationality	Time	Notes
1st place, gold medalist(s)	5	Guilherme Caribé	Brazil	48.06	
2nd place, silver medalist(s)	6	Brooks Curry	United States	48.38	
2nd place, silver medalist(s)	4	Jonny Kulow	United States	48.38	
4	1	Javier Acevedo	Canada	48.88	
5	3	Marcelo Chierighini	Brazil	48.92	
6	8	Alberto Mestre	Venezuela	48.96	
7	2	Andres Dupont	Mexico	49.03	
8	7	Jorge Iga	Mexico	49.18	
