= Antigua and Barbuda at the 2017 World Aquatics Championships =

- Flag of Antigua and Barbuda
- FINA code: ANT
- National federation: Antigua and Barbuda Amateur Swimming Association

in Budapest, Hungary
- Competitors: 4 in 1 sport
- Medals: Gold 0 Silver 0 Bronze 0 Total 0

World Aquatics Championships appearances
- 1973; 1975; 1978; 1982; 1986; 1991; 1994; 1998; 2001; 2003; 2005; 2007; 2009; 2011; 2013; 2015; 2017; 2019; 2022; 2023; 2024

Antigua and Barbuda competed at the 2017 World Aquatics Championships in Budapest, Hungary from 14 to 30 July.

== Swimming ==
Antigua and Barbuda received a Universality invitation from FINA to send a maximum of four swimmers (two men and two women) to the World Championships.

Athlete	Event	Heat		Semifinal		Final	
Athlete	Event	Time	Rank	Time	Rank	Time	Rank
Noah Mascoll-Gomes	Men's 100 m freestyle	52.81	72	did not advance			
Noah Mascoll-Gomes	Men's 200 m freestyle	1:55.32	62	did not advance			
Stefano Mitchell	Men's 50 m freestyle	24.15	=80	did not advance			
Stefano Mitchell	Men's 50 m butterfly	25.98	57	did not advance			
Gabby Gittens	Women's 50 m backstroke	34.16	59	did not advance			
Gabby Gittens	Women's 50 m butterfly	31.77	50	did not advance			
Bianca Mitchell	Women's 100 m freestyle	1:05.06	70	did not advance			
Bianca Mitchell	Women's 200 m freestyle	2:24.67	49	did not advance			
