= List of Turkmen records in swimming =

The Turkmen records in swimming are the fastest ever performances of swimmers from Turkmenistan, which are recognised and ratified by the National Federation of Aquatics of Turkmenistan.

== Long Course (50 m) ==
=== Men ===
Event	Time		Name	Club	Date	Meet	Location	Ref
50 m freestyle	24.10	h	Musa Zhalayev	Turkmenistan	16 February 2024	World Championships	Doha, Qatar	
50 m freestyle	23.39		Musa Zhalayev	Turkmenistan	6 April 2025	Thailand Age Group Championships	Samut Prakan, Thailand	
100 m freestyle	52.04	h	Musa Zhalayev	Turkmenistan	14 February 2024	World Championships	Doha, Qatar	
100 m freestyle	51.63	h, #	Musa Zhalayev	Turkmenistan	27 September 2023	Asian Games	Hangzhou, China	
200 m freestyle	1:56.28	'#'	Musa Zhalayev	Turkmenistan	27 April 2024	Malaysia Age Group Championships	Kuala Lumpur, Malaysia	
400 m freestyle	4:22.63		Musa Zhalayev	Turkmenistan	28 April 2024	Malaysia Age Group Championships	Kuala Lumpur, Malaysia	
800 m freestyle	9:06.73		Musa Zhalayev	Turkmenistan	28 April 2024	Malaysia Age Group Championships	Kuala Lumpur, Malaysia	
1500 m freestyle	18:00.44		Musa Zhalayev	Turkmenistan	25 April 2024	Malaysia Age Group Championships	Kuala Lumpur, Malaysia	
50 m backstroke	25.82		Merdan Ataýew	Turkmenistan	16 May 2017	Islamic Solidarity Games	Baku, Azerbaijan	
100 m backstroke	55.24	h	Merdan Ataýew	Turkmenistan	25 July 2021	Olympic Games	Tokyo, Japan	
200 m backstroke	2:03.68	h	Merdan Ataýew	Turkmenistan	28 July 2021	Olympic Games	Tokyo, Japan	
50 m breaststroke	29.28	h	David Akopyan	Turkmenistan	25 September 2026	Asian Games	Tokyo, Japan	
100 m breaststroke	1:04.72	h	David Akopyan	Turkmenistan	21 September 2026	Asian Games	Tokyo, Japan	
200 m breaststroke	2:29.15	h	Batyr Täcmyradov	Turkmenistan	21 August 2018	Asian Games	Jakarta, Indonesia	
50 m butterfly	24.89	h	David Akopyan	Turkmenistan	24 September 2026	Asian Games	Tokyo, Japan	
100 m butterfly	56.26	h	David Akopyan	Turkmenistan	23 September 2026	Asian Games	Tokyo, Japan	
200 m butterfly	2:21.34		David Akopyan	Turkmenistan	10 April 2025	Thailand Age Group Championships	Samut Prakan, Thailand	
200 m individual medley	2:11.87		David Akopyan	Turkmenistan	5 April 2025	Thailand Age Group Championships	Samut Prakan, Thailand	
400 m individual medley	5:02.40	h	David Akopyan	Turkmenistan	8 September 2023	World Junior Championships	Netanya, Israel	
400 m individual medley	4:54.34		David Akopyan	Turkmenistan	5 April 2025	Thailand Age Group Championships	Samut Prakan, Thailand	
4×100 m freestyle relay								
4×200 m freestyle relay								
4×100 m medley relay	3:58.49		Merdan Atayev (57.59); Batyr Tachmyradov (1:08.58); Musa Zhalayev (58.24); Agajan Jorayev (54.08)	Turkmenistan	17 August 2022	Islamic Solidarity Games	Konya, Turkey	

Legend: # – Record awaiting ratification by National Federation of Aquatics of Turkmenistan; WR – World record; AS – Asian record; e – equalled existing record;
Records not set in finals: h – heat; sf – semifinal; r – relay 1st leg; rh – relay heat 1st leg; b – B final; † – en route to final mark; so – swim-off; tt – time trial

=== Women ===
,

Event	Time		Name	Club	Date	Meet	Location	Ref
50 m freestyle	27.84		Darya Semyonova	Turkmenistan	17 August 2022	Islamic Solidarity Games	Konya, Turkey	
100 m freestyle	1:02.37		Darya Semyonova	Turkmenistan	15 August 2022	Islamic Solidarity Games	Konya, Turkey	
100 m freestyle	1:01.23	'#'	Anastasiya Morginshtern	Turkmenistan	7 April 2025	Thailand Age Group Championships	Samut Prakan, Thailand	
200 m freestyle	2:22.29	h	Anastasiya Morginshtern	Turkmenistan	9 September 2023	World Junior Championships	Netanya, Israel	
200 m freestyle	2:21.82	'#'	Anastasiya Morginshtern	Turkmenistan	27 April 2024	Malaysia Age Group Championships	Kuala Lumpur, Malaysia	
400 m freestyle	5:40.29	h	Jennet Saryyeva	-	29 July 2012	Olympic Games	London, United Kingdom	
400 m freestyle	5:09.30	'#'	Valeriya Mirenskaya	Turkmenistan	7 April 2025	Thailand Age Group Championships	Samut Prakan, Thailand	
800 m freestyle	10:54.47		Anastasiya Morginshtern	Turkmenistan	25 April 2024	Malaysia Age Group Championships	Kuala Lumpur, Malaysia	
1500 m freestyle	20:41.45		Aynura Primova	Turkmenistan	5 April 2025	Thailand Age Group Championships	Samut Prakan, Thailand	
50 m backstroke	31.60	h	Aynura Primova	Turkmenistan	7 September 2023	World Junior Championships	Netanya, Israel	
100 m backstroke	1:08.05	h	Aynura Primova	Turkmenistan	28 July 2025	World Championships	Singapore, Singapore	
200 m backstroke	2:29.24	h	Aynura Primova	Turkmenistan	6 September 2023	World Junior Championships	Netanya, Israel	
50 m breaststroke	34.22	h, †	Darya Semyonova	Turkmenistan	25 July 2021	Olympic Games	Tokyo, Japan	
100 m breaststroke	1:16.37	h	Darya Semyonova	Turkmenistan	25 July 2021	Olympic Games	Tokyo, Japan	
200 m breaststroke	2:51.12	h	Darya Semyonova	Turkmenistan	7 April 2016	6th Dubai International Championships	Dubai, United Arab Emirates	
50 m butterfly	31.49	h	Merjen Saryyeva	Turkmenistan	19 August 2014	Youth Olympic Games	Nanjing, China	
50 m butterfly	30.43	'#'	Anastasiya Morginshtern	Turkmenistan	25 April 2024	Malaysia Age Group Championships	Kuala Lumpur, Malaysia	
100 m butterfly	1:12.34		Anastasiya Morginshtern	Turkmenistan	28 April 2024	Malaysia Age Group Championships	Kuala Lumpur, Malaysia	
200 m butterfly	3:06.47		Valeriya Mirenskaya	Turkmenistan	5 April 2025	Thailand Age Group Championships	Samut Prakan, Thailand	
200 m individual medley	2:31.86		Darya Semyonova	Turkmenistan	13 August 2022	Islamic Solidarity Games	Konya, Turkey	
400 m individual medley								
4×100 m freestyle relay								
4×200 m freestyle relay								
4×100 m medley relay								

Legend: # – Record awaiting ratification by National Federation of Aquatics of Turkmenistan; WR – World record; AS – Asian record; e – equalled existing record;
Records not set in finals: h – heat; sf – semifinal; r – relay 1st leg; rh – relay heat 1st leg; b – B final; † – en route to final mark; so – swim-off; tt – time trial

== Short Course (25 m) ==
=== Men ===
Event	Time		Name	Club	Date	Meet	Location	Ref
50 m freestyle	22.77	h	Musa Zhalayev	Turkmenistan	14 December 2024	World Championships	Budapest, Hungary	
100 m freestyle	50.37	h	Musa Zhalayev	Turkmenistan	11 December 2024	World Championships	Budapest, Hungary	
200 m freestyle	1:57.87	h	Alan Muhin	Turkmenistan	3 October 2026	World Cup	Baku, Azerbaijan	
400 m freestyle								
800 m freestyle								
1500 m freestyle								
50 m backstroke	24.77		Merdan Ataýew	Turkmenistan	23 September 2017	Asian Indoor and Martial Arts Games	Ashgabat, Turkmenistan	
100 m backstroke	52.86		Merdan Ataýew	Turkmenistan	24 September 2017	Asian Indoor and Martial Arts Games	Ashgabat, Turkmenistan	
200 m backstroke	1:59.49	h	Merdan Ataýew	Turkmenistan	18 December 2022	World Championships	Melbourne, Australia	
50 m breaststroke	28.43	h	David Akopyan	Turkmenistan	2 October 2026	World Cup	Baku, Azerbaijan	
100 m breaststroke	1:02.97	h	David Akopyan	Turkmenistan	17 October 2026	World Cup	Astana, Kazakhstan	
200 m breaststroke	2:19.42	h	David Akopyan	Turkmenistan	3 October 2026	World Cup	Baku, Azerbaijan	
50m butterfly	24.76	h	Musa Zhalayev	Turkmenistan	3 October 2026	World Cup	Baku, Azerbaijan	
100m butterfly	55.23	h	David Akopyan	Turkmenistan	16 October 2026	World Cup	Astana, Kazakhstan	
200m butterfly	2:08.47	h	David Akopyan	Turkmenistan	2 October 2026	World Cup	Baku, Azerbaijan	
100m individual medley	56.92	h	David Akopyan	Turkmenistan	1 October 2026	World Cup	Baku, Azerbaijan	
200m individual medley	2:13.30	h	Ilýa Klubcenko	Turkmenistan	22 September 2017	Asian Indoor and Martial Arts Games	Ashgabat, Turkmenistan	
400m individual medley								
4×50m freestyle relay	1:35.96	h	Valentin Gorshkov (24.01); Muhammet Jumagylyjow (23.83); Ilýa Klubcenko (23.80); Merdan Ataýew (24.32)	Turkmenistan	24 September 2017	Asian Indoor and Martial Arts Games	Ashgabat, Turkmenistan	
4×100m freestyle relay	3:32.35	h	Valentin Gorshkov (52.12); Agajan Joraýew (53.44); Teýmur Ýusupow (53.68); Ilýa Klubcenko (53.11)	Turkmenistan	23 September 2017	Asian Indoor and Martial Arts Games	Ashgabat, Turkmenistan	
4×200m freestyle relay								
4×50m medley relay	1:44.90	h	Merdan Ataýew (25.91); Berdyguly Saparow (29.73); Ruslan Nazarow (25.62); Walentin Gorskow (23.64)	Turkmenistan	22 September 2017	Asian Indoor and Martial Arts Games	Ashgabat, Turkmenistan	
4×100m medley relay	3:54.50	h	Musa Jalaýew (1:00.26); Batyr Täcmyradow (1:05.10); Ruslan Nazarow (56.98); Ilýa Klubcenko (52.16)	Turkmenistan	25 September 2017	Asian Indoor and Martial Arts Games	Ashgabat, Turkmenistan	

Legend: # – Record awaiting ratification by National Federation of Aquatics of Turkmenistan; WR – World record; AS – Asian record; e – equalled existing record;
Records not set in finals: h – heat; sf – semifinal; r – relay 1st leg; rh – relay heat 1st leg; b – B final; † – en route to final mark; so – swim-off; tt – time trial

=== Women ===
Event	Time		Name	Club	Date	Meet	Location	Ref
50 m freestyle	27.63	h	Anastasiya Morginshtern	Turkmenistan	14 December 2024	World Championships	Budapest, Hungary	
100 m freestyle	1:00.98	h	Anastasiya Morginshtern	Turkmenistan	11 December 2024	World Championships	Budapest, Hungary	
200 m freestyle								
400 m freestyle								
800 m freestyle								
1500 m freestyle								
50 m backstroke	32.83	h	Darýa Semýonowa	Turkmenistan	23 September 2017	Asian Indoor and Martial Arts Games	Ashgabat, Turkmenistan	
100 m backstroke	1:13.83	r	Enes Begmyradowa	Turkmenistan	25 September 2017	Asian Indoor and Martial Arts Games	Ashgabat, Turkmenistan	
200 m backstroke								
50 m breaststroke	34.76	h	Darýa Semýonowa	Turkmenistan	25 September 2017	Asian Indoor and Martial Arts Games	Ashgabat, Turkmenistan	
100 m breaststroke	1:14.17	h	Darýa Semýonowa	Turkmenistan	22 September 2017	Asian Indoor and Martial Arts Games	Ashgabat, Turkmenistan	
200 m breaststroke								
50 m butterfly	30.71	h	Merjen Sariyeva	Turkmenistan	4 December 2014	World Championships	Doha, Qatar	
100 m butterfly								
200 m butterfly								
100 m individual medley								
200 m individual medley								
400 m individual medley								
4×50 m freestyle relay	1:57.59		Darýa Semýonowa (29.23); Anastasiýa Morginstern (30.39); Enes Begmyradowa (29.05); Keýik Weliýewa (28.92)	Turkmenistan	24 September 2017	Asian Indoor and Martial Arts Games	Ashgabat, Turkmenistan	
4×100 m freestyle relay	4:22.42		Darýa Semýonowa (1:03.82); Anastasiýa Morginstern (1:08.91); Enes Begmyradowa (1:05.14); Keýik Weliýewa (1:04.55)	Turkmenistan	23 September 2017	Asian Indoor and Martial Arts Games	Ashgabat, Turkmenistan	
4×200 m freestyle relay								
4×50 m medley relay	2:08.98		Enes Begmyradowa (33.41); Darýa Semýonowa (34.29); Keýik Weliýewa (31.20); Anastasiýa Morginstern (30.08)	Turkmenistan	22 September 2017	Asian Indoor and Martial Arts Games	Ashgabat, Turkmenistan	
4×100 m medley relay	4:52.78		Enes Begmyradowa (1:13.83); Darýa Semýonowa (1:18.07); Keýik Weliýewa (1:13.65); Anastasiýa Morginstern (1:07.23)	Turkmenistan	25 September 2017	Asian Indoor and Martial Arts Games	Ashgabat, Turkmenistan	

Legend: # – Record awaiting ratification by National Federation of Aquatics of Turkmenistan; WR – World record; AS – Asian record; e – equalled existing record;
Records not set in finals: h – heat; sf – semifinal; r – relay 1st leg; rh – relay heat 1st leg; b – B final; † – en route to final mark; so – swim-off; tt – time trial
