= Guinea at the 2023 World Aquatics Championships =

- Flag of Guinea
- FINA code: GUI
- National federation: Fédération Guinéenne de Natation et Sauvetage

in Fukuoka, Japan
- Competitors: 4 in 2 sports
- Medals: Gold 0 Silver 0 Bronze 0 Total 0

World Aquatics Championships appearances
- 1973; 1975; 1978; 1982; 1986; 1991; 1994; 1998; 2001; 2003; 2005; 2007; 2009; 2011; 2013; 2015; 2017; 2019; 2022; 2023; 2024

Guinea competed at the 2023 World Aquatics Championships in Fukuoka, Japan from 14 to 30 July.

== Artistic swimming ==
Guinea entered 1 artistic swimmer.

Women

Athlete	Event	Preliminaries		Final	
Athlete	Event	Points	Rank	Points	Rank
Alexandra Mansaré-Traoré	Solo technical routine	140.8950	30	Did not advance	
Alexandra Mansaré-Traoré	Solo free routine	109.9249	26	Did not advance	

== Swimming ==
Guinea entered 4 swimmers.

Men

Athlete	Event	Heat		Semifinal		Final	
Athlete	Event	Time	Rank	Time	Rank	Time	Rank
Fodé Amara Camara	50 metre breaststroke	33.42 NR	56	Did not advance			
Fodé Amara Camara	50 metre butterfly	28.42	76	Did not advance			
Elhadj Diallo	50 metre freestyle	27.69	103	Did not advance			
Elhadj Diallo	100 metre butterfly	1:05.39	73	Did not advance			

Women

Athlete	Event	Heat		Semifinal		Final	
Athlete	Event	Time	Rank	Time	Rank	Time	Rank
Mariama Sow	50 metre freestyle	Did not start					
Mariama Sow	100 metre freestyle	Did not start					
Mariama Touré	50 metre breaststroke	41.81	47	Did not advance			
Mariama Touré	100 metre breaststroke	1:35.41	57	Did not advance			
