= Djibouti at the 2022 World Aquatics Championships =

- Flag of Djibouti
- FINA code: DJI
- National federation: Djibouti Swimming Federation

in Budapest, Hungary
- Competitors: 2 in 1 sport
- Medals: Gold 0 Silver 0 Bronze 0 Total 0

World Aquatics Championships appearances
- 2009; 2011; 2013; 2015; 2017; 2019; 2022; 2023; 2024

Djibouti competed at the 2022 World Aquatics Championships in Budapest, Hungary from 18 June to 3 July.

== Swimming ==
Athlete	Event	Heat		Semifinal		Final	
Athlete	Event	Time	Rank	Time	Rank	Time	Rank
Daoud Ali Haroun	Men's 50 m breaststroke	39.58	56	did not advance			
Daoud Ali Haroun	Men's 100 metre breaststroke	DSQ		did not advance			
Houmed Houssein Barkat	Men's 50 metre freestyle	27.05	81	did not advance			
Houmed Houssein Barkat	Men's 50 metre butterfly	29.57	68	did not advance			
