= List of Antiguan and Barbudan records in swimming =

The Antiguan and Barbudan Records in Swimming are the fastest times ever swum by a swimmer representing Antigua and Barbuda. These records are kept/maintained by the Antigua and Barbuda Swimming Federation (ABSF). Records are recognized for long course (50m) and short course (25m) in the following events:

- freestyle: 50, 100, 200, 400, 800 and 1500;
- backstroke: 50, 100 and 200;
- breaststroke: 50, 100 and 200;
- butterfly: 50, 100 and 200;
- Individual medley: 100 (short course only), 200 and 400;

== Long course (50m) ==
=== Men ===
Event	Time		Name	Club	Date	Meet	Location	Ref
50 m freestyle	22.99		Stefano Mitchell	Antigua and Barbuda	2 April 2024 (Note: by official result source; 31 March 2024 by ABSF source, a typo)	CARIFTA Championships	Nassau, Bahamas	
100 m freestyle	50.98		Stefano Mitchell	Antigua and Barbuda	16 June 2021	Colombian Championships	Colombia	
200 m freestyle	1:53.16	h	Noah Mascoll-Gomes	Antigua and Barbuda	7 August 2016	Olympic Games	Rio de Janeiro, Brazil	
400 m freestyle	4:00.79		Noah Mascoll-Gomes	Antigua and Barbuda	16 June 2021	Colombian Championships	Colombia	
800 m freestyle	8:31.87		Noah Mascoll-Gomes	-	24 March 2021			
1500 m freestyle	17:58.21		Alessandro Bazzoni	Vipers	19 December 2025 (Note: 19 December 2026 by ABSF source, a typo)	Bahamas Winter Invitational	Nassau, Bahamas	
50m backstroke	27.74		Noah Mascoll-Gomes	-	15 July 2023			
100m backstroke	1:02.79	r	Tivon Benjamin	Antigua and Barbuda	20 April 2025	CARIFTA Championships	Couva, Trinidad and Tobago	
200m backstroke	2:21.15		Jamie Tranter	Antigua and Barbuda	4 April 2026	CARIFTA Championships	Le Lamentin, Martinique	
50m breaststroke	28.09	h	Jadon Wuilliez	Antigua and Barbuda	25 July 2023 (Note: by official result source; 24 July 2023 by ABSF source, a typo)	World Championships	Fukuoka, Japan	
50m breaststroke	27.69	h, #	Jadon Wuilliez	Antigua and Barbuda	26 July 2026	Commonwealth Games	Glasgow, United Kingdom	
50m breaststroke	28.07	h, not ratified	Jadon Wuilliez	Texas Christian University	4 December 2025	U.S. Open	Austin, United States	
100m breaststroke	1:02.10	h	Jadon Wuilliez	Antigua and Barbuda	23 July 2023	World Championships	Fukuoka, Japan	
200m breaststroke	2:34.75		Jadon Wuilliez	Antigua and Barbuda	15 April 2017	CARIFTA Championships	Nassau, Bahamas	
50m butterfly	25.14	b	Tivon Benjamin	Antigua and Barbuda	1 August 2026 (Note: by official result source; 28 July 2026 by ABSF source, a typo)	CAC Games	Santo Domingo, Dominican Republic	
100m butterfly	55.08	h	Ethan Stubbs-Green	Antigua and Barbuda	19 April 2025 (Note: by official result source; 20 April 2025 by ABSF source, a typo)	CARIFTA Championships	Couva, Trinidad and Tobago	
200m butterfly	2:04.62	h	Ethan Stubbs-Green	Antigua and Barbuda	27 July 2026	Commonwealth Games	Glasgow, United Kingdom	
200m individual medley	2:14.36		Stefano Mitchell	-	21 May 2021	-		
400m individual medley	5:08.89		Alessandro Bazzoni	Antigua and Barbuda	2 April 2026	CARIFTA Championships	Le Lamentin, Martinique	
4×100m freestyle relay	3:45.77			-	2016			
4×200m freestyle relay	9:19.10			-	2013			
4×100m medley relay	4:17.51			-	2017			

Legend: # – Record awaiting ratification by Antigua and Barbuda Swimming Federation; WR – World record; AM – Americas record; e – equalled existing record;
Records not set in finals: h – heat; sf – semifinal; r – relay 1st leg; rh – relay heat 1st leg; b – B final; † – en route to final mark; so – swim-off; tt – time trial

=== Women ===
Event	Time		Name	Club	Date	Meet	Location	Ref
50 m freestyle	26.89	h	Aunjelique Liddie	Antigua and Barbuda	22 April 2025 (Note: by official result source; 20 April 2025 by ABSF source, a typo)	CARIFTA Championships	Couva, Trinidad and Tobago	
100 m freestyle	58.91		Aunjelique Liddie	Antigua and Barbuda	21 April 2025 (Note: by official result source; 20 April 2025 by ABSF source, a typo)	CARIFTA Championships	Couva, Trinidad and Tobago	
200 m freestyle	2:09.51		Bianca Mitchell	Azura Florida Aquatics	17 May 2025 (Note: by official result source; 16 May 2025 by ABSF source, a typo)	FG POMP Jesse Vassallo Invitational	Pompano Beach, United States	
400 m freestyle	4:34.56		Bianca Mitchell	Azura Florida Aquatics	16 May 2025	FG POMP Jesse Vassallo Invitational	Pompano Beach, United States	
800 m freestyle	9:30.93		Madison MacMillan	Antigua and Barbuda	20 August 2025	World Junior Championships	Otopeni, Romania	
1500 m freestyle	18:15.98		Madison MacMillan	Antigua and Barbuda	23 August 2025	World Junior Championships	Otopeni, Romania	
50 m backstroke	32.41		Madison MacMillan	Vipers	11 December 2024 (Note: by official result source; 12 December 2024 by ABSF source, a typo)	ASATT Invitational Championships	Couva, Trinidad and Tobago	
100 m backstroke	1:08.31	h	Madison MacMillan	Antigua and Barbuda	12 August 2025	Junior Pan American Games	Asunción, Paraguay	
200 m backstroke	2:28.65	h	Madison MacMillan	Antigua and Barbuda	11 August 2025	Junior Pan American Games	Asunción, Paraguay	
50 m breaststroke	32.73	h	Ellie Shaw	Antigua and Barbuda	17 February 2024	World Championships	Doha, Qatar	
100 m breaststroke	1:12.64		Ellie Shaw	Antigua and Barbuda	22 August 2024 (Note: by official result source; 23 August 2025 by ABSF source, a typo)	PanAm Aquatics Age Group Championships	San Juan, Puerto Rico	
200 m breaststroke	2:39.13		Ellie Shaw	Antigua and Barbuda	2 April 2024 (Note: by official result source; 31 March 2024 by ABSF source, a typo)	CARIFTA Championships	Nassau, Bahamas	
50 m butterfly	29.12		Samantha Roberts	Azura Florida Aquatics	29 April 2021 (Note: by official result source; 30 April 2021 by ABSF source, a typo)	UANA Tokyo Qualifier	Orlando, United States	
100 m butterfly	1:06.08		Bianca Mitchell	Vipers	19 December 2025 (Note: 19 December 2026 by ABSF source, a typo)	Bahamas Winter Invitational	Nassau, Bahamas	
200 m butterfly	2:32.32		Anya DeGannes	Antigua and Barbuda	6 April 2026	CARIFTA Championships	Le Lamentin, Martinique	
200 m individual medley	2:25.74		Ellie Shaw	Antigua and Barbuda	6 April 2026	CARIFTA Championships	Le Lamentin, Martinique	
400 m individual medley	5:15.85		Madison MacMillan	Antigua and Barbuda	5 April 2026	CARIFTA Championships	Le Lamentin, Martinique	
4×100 m freestyle relay								
4×200 m freestyle relay								
4×100 m medley relay	4:58.22			-	2017			

Legend: # – Record awaiting ratification by Antigua and Barbuda Swimming Federation; WR – World record; AM – Americas record; e – equalled existing record;
Records not set in finals: h – heat; sf – semifinal; r – relay 1st leg; rh – relay heat 1st leg; b – B final; † – en route to final mark; so – swim-off; tt – time trial

=== Mixed relay ===
Event	Time		Name	Club	Date	Meet	Location	Ref
4×100m freestyle relay	3:45.38	h	Stefano Mitchell (51.74); Jadon Wuilliez (51.42); Bianca Mitchell (1:01.05); Aunjelique Liddie (1:01.17)	Antigua and Barbuda	29 July 2023	World Championships	Fukuoka, Japan	
4×100m medley relay	4:19.49	'#'	Ellie Shaw (1:02.15); Jadon Wuilliez (1:03.70); Olivia Fuller (1:08.66); Noah Mascoll-Gomes (1:04.98)	Antigua and Barbuda	24 June 2023	CAC Games	San Salvador, El Salvador	

Legend: # – Record awaiting ratification by Antigua and Barbuda Swimming Federation; WR – World record; AM – Americas record; e – equalled existing record;
Records not set in finals: h – heat; sf – semifinal; r – relay 1st leg; rh – relay heat 1st leg; b – B final; † – en route to final mark; so – swim-off; tt – time trial

== Short course (25m) ==
=== Men ===
Event	Time		Name	Club	Date	Meet	Location	Ref
50 m freestyle	22.43	h	Stefano Mitchell	Antigua and Barbuda	23 October 2025	World Cup	Toronto, Canada	
100 m freestyle	49.21	h	Stefano Mitchell	Antigua and Barbuda	20 December 2021	World Championships	Abu Dhabi, United Arab Emirates	
200 m freestyle	1:48.42	h	Noah Mascoll-Gomes	-	25 March 2022			
400 m freestyle	3:53.74		Noah Mascoll-Gomes	Dalhousie University Tigers	8 March 2024	U SPORTS Championships	Pointe-Claire, Canada	
800 m freestyle	9:01.48		Tivon Benjamin	-	24 February 2024			
1500 m freestyle	17:25.21		Alessandro Bazzoni	Vipers	30 January 2026	War Go-the-Distance	Cedar Grove, Antigua and Barbuda	
50 m backstroke	26.17		Noah Mascoll-Gomes	Mount Allison Mounties	9 February 2019	Subway AUS Championships	Halifax, Canada	
100 m backstroke	56.50	h	Noah Mascoll-Gomes	Dalhousie University Tigers	19 November 2023 (Note: by official result source; 26 November 2023 by ABSF source, a typo)	AUS Kemp Fry Invitational	Halifax, Canada	
200 m backstroke	2:14.43		Tivon Benjamin	-	4 March 2023			
50 m breaststroke	26.98	h	Jadon Wuilliez	Antigua and Barbuda	20 December 2021	World Championships	Abu Dhabi, United Arab Emirates	
100 m breaststroke	58.73	h	Jadon Wuilliez	Antigua and Barbuda	16 December 2021	World Championships	Abu Dhabi, United Arab Emirates	
200 m breaststroke	2:15.81		Jadon Wuilliez	6 December 2019				
50 m butterfly	24.71	h	Stefano Mitchell	Antigua and Barbuda	25 October 2025	World Cup	Toronto, Canada	
100 m butterfly	54.44		Ethan Stubbs-Green	Millfield	7 December 2024	Swim England National Winter Championships	Sheffield, Great Britain	
200 m butterfly	2:00.22		Ethan Stubbs-Green	Millfield	8 December 2024	Swim England National Winter Championships	Sheffield, Great Britain	
100 m individual medley	57.12		Jadon Wuilliez	-	26 June 2021			
200 m individual medley	2:07.72		Jadon Wuilliez	-	27 July 2021			
400 m individual medley	4:51.70		Noah Mascoll-Gomes	-	2015			

Legend: # – Record awaiting ratification by Antigua and Barbuda Swimming Federation; WR – World record; AM – Americas record; e – equalled existing record;
Records not set in finals: h – heat; sf – semifinal; r – relay 1st leg; rh – relay heat 1st leg; b – B final; † – en route to final mark; so – swim-off; tt – time trial

=== Women ===
Event	Time		Name	Club	Date	Meet	Location	Ref
50 m freestyle	26.44		Samantha Roberts	-	7 February 2020			
100 m freestyle	58.02	h	Aunjelique Liddie	Antigua and Barbuda	11 December 2024	World Championships	Budapest, Hungary	
200 m freestyle	2:07.94		Madison MacMillan	Vipers	3 October 2025	Annual ABSF Invitational Championships	Cedar Grove, Netherlands Antilles	
400 m freestyle	4:29.57		Madison MacMillan	Vipers	3 October 2025	Annual ABSF Invitational Championships	Cedar Grove, Antigua and Barbuda	
400 m freestyle	4:28.85	#	Madison MacMillan	Antigua and Barbuda	6 November 2026	OECS Championships	Castries, Saint Lucia	
800 m freestyle	9:20.68		Madison MacMillan	-	30 January 2026	WAR Go The Distance	St. John's, Netherlands Antilles	
1500 m freestyle	17:49.67		Madison MacMillan	Vipers	20 February 2026	ABSF Nationals	St. John's, Netherlands Antilles	
50 m backstroke	30.80		Madison MacMillan	Vipers	1 May 2026	WAR Developmetal Invitational	St. John's, Antigua and Barbuda	
50 m backstroke	30.62	#	Madison MacMillan	Antigua and Barbuda	8 November 2026	OECS Championships	Castries, Saint Lucia	
100 m backstroke	1:05.42		Madison MacMillan	Vipers	3 October 2025	Annual ABSF Invitational Championships	Cedar Grove, Antigua and Barbuda	
200 m backstroke	2:25.48		Madison MacMillan	Vipers	28 February 2023	Annual ABSF Invitational Championships	Cedar Grove, Antigua and Barbuda	
50 m breaststroke	32.58		Ellie Shaw	-	24 February 2024			
100 m breaststroke	1:11.41		Ellie Shaw	Wadadli Aquatic Racers	27 June 2025	Vipers 4th Annual Meet	Cedar Grove, Antigua and Barbuda	
200 m breaststroke	2:38.33		Bianca Mitchell	Vipers	11 April 2025	RHAC Invitational	Saint Lucia	
50 m butterfly	28.36	h	Samantha Roberts	Antigua and Barbuda	18 December 2021	World Championships	Abu Dhabi, United Arab Emirates	
100 m butterfly	1:04.95		Samantha Roberts	-	7 February 2020			
200 m butterfly	2:29.88		Anya DeGannes	Vipers	21 February 2026	ABSF Nationals	St. John's, Antigua and Barbuda	
100 m individual medley	1:09.59		Olivia Fuller	-	19 October 2019			
200 m individual medley	2:24.19		Ellie Shaw	Wadadli Aquatic Racers	27 June 2025	Vipers 4th Annual Meet	Cedar Grove, Antigua and Barbuda	
400 m individual medley	5:10.91		Madison MacMillan	-	30 January 2026			

Legend: # – Record awaiting ratification by Antigua and Barbuda Swimming Federation; WR – World record; AM – Americas record; e – equalled existing record;
Records not set in finals: h – heat; sf – semifinal; r – relay 1st leg; rh – relay heat 1st leg; b – B final; † – en route to final mark; so – swim-off; tt – time trial

=== Mixed relay ===
Event	Time		Name	Club	Date	Meet	Location	Ref
4×50 m freestyle relay	1:43.53	h	Stefano Mitchell (23.39); Olivia Fuller (27.98); Bianca Mitchell (28.82); Noah Mascoll-Gomes (23.34)	Antigua and Barbuda	12 December 2018	World Championships	Hangzhou, China	
4×50 m medley relay	1:59.15	h	Noah Mascoll-Gomes (27.39); Bianca Mitchell (38.35); Stefano Mitchell (25.10); Olivia Fuller (28.31)	Antigua and Barbuda	13 December 2018	World Championships	Hangzhou, China	

Legend: # – Record awaiting ratification by Antigua and Barbuda Swimming Federation; e – equalled existing record;
Records not set in finals: h – heat; so – swim-off
