= Antigua and Barbuda at the 2019 World Aquatics Championships =

- Flag of Antigua and Barbuda
- FINA code: ANT
- National federation: Antigua and Barbuda Swimming Federation

in Gwangju, South Korea
- Competitors: 4 in 1 sport
- Medals: Gold 0 Silver 0 Bronze 0 Total 0

World Aquatics Championships appearances
- 1973; 1975; 1978; 1982; 1986; 1991; 1994; 1998; 2001; 2003; 2005; 2007; 2009; 2011; 2013; 2015; 2017; 2019; 2022; 2023; 2024

Antigua and Barbuda competed at the 2019 World Aquatics Championships in Gwangju, South Korea from 12 to 28 July.

== Swimming ==
Antigua and Barbuda entered four swimmers.

Men

Athlete	Event	Heat		Semifinal		Final	
Athlete	Event	Time	Rank	Time	Rank	Time	Rank
Noah Mascoll-Gomes	100 m freestyle	52.12	=73	did not advance			
Noah Mascoll-Gomes	200 m freestyle	1:54.20	56	did not advance			
Stefano Mitchell	50 m freestyle	23.44	62	did not advance			
Stefano Mitchell	50 m butterfly	25.69	65	did not advance			

Women

Athlete	Event	Heat		Semifinal		Final	
Athlete	Event	Time	Rank	Time	Rank	Time	Rank
Olivia Fuller	200 m freestyle	2:19.71	57	did not advance			
Olivia Fuller	50 m butterfly	30.88	52	did not advance			
Samantha Roberts	50 m freestyle	27.27	52	did not advance			
Samantha Roberts	100 m freestyle	1:00.53	68	did not advance			
