= Djibouti at the 2013 World Aquatics Championships =

- Flag of Djibouti
- FINA code: DJI
- National federation: Federation Djiboutienne de Natation

in Barcelona, Spain
- Competitors: 2 in 1 sports
- Medals: Gold 0 Silver 0 Bronze 0 Total 0

World Aquatics Championships appearances
- 2009; 2011; 2013; 2015; 2017; 2019; 2022; 2023; 2024

Djibouti competed at the 2013 World Aquatics Championships in Barcelona, Spain from 19 July to 4 August 2013.

== Swimming ==
Djibouti swimmers achieved qualifying standards in the following events (up to a maximum of 2 swimmers in each event at the A-standard entry time, and 1 at the B-standard):

Men

Athlete	Event	Heat		Semifinal		Final	
Athlete	Event	Time	Rank	Time	Rank	Time	Rank
Ahmed Borhane	50 m freestyle	26.92	81	did not advance			
Ahmed Borhane	50 m butterfly	28.03	70	did not advance			
Abdourahman Osman	50 m breaststroke	34.93	75	did not advance			
