= List of East Timorese records in swimming =

The East Timorese records in swimming are the fastest ever performances of swimmers from the East Timor, which are recognised and ratified by the National Swimming Federation of Timor Leste.

All records were set in finals unless noted otherwise.

== Long Course (50 m) ==
=== Men ===
Event	Time		Name	Club	Date	Meet	Location	Ref
50 m freestyle	28.13	h	José da Silva Viegas	East Timor	19 May 2022	Southeast Asian Games	Hanoi, Vietnam	
100 m freestyle	1:04.92	h	José da Silva Viegas	East Timor	15 May 2022	Southeast Asian Games	Hanoi, Vietnam	
200 m freestyle	2:30.14	h	Jolanio Guterres	East Timor	25 April 2025	67th MILO/MAS Malaysia Open Championships	Kuala Lumpur, Malaysia	
400 m freestyle	5:27.33	h	Jolanio Guterres	East Timor	26 April 2025	67th MILO/MAS Malaysia Open Championships	Kuala Lumpur, Malaysia	
800 m freestyle								
1500 m freestyle								
50 m backstroke								
100 m backstroke								
200 m backstroke								
50 m breaststroke								
100 m breaststroke								
200 m breaststroke								
50m butterfly	31.64	h	Jolanio Guterres	East Timor	24 April 2025	67th MILO/MAS Malaysia Open Championships	Kuala Lumpur, Malaysia	
100 m butterfly	1:20.01	†	Jolanio Guterres	East Timor	27 April 2025	67th MILO/MAS Malaysia Open Championships	Kuala Lumpur, Malaysia	
200 m butterfly	3:06.98	h	Jolanio Guterres	East Timor	27 April 2025	67th MILO/MAS Malaysia Open Championships	Kuala Lumpur, Malaysia	
200 m individual medley								
400 m individual medley	6:16.43	h	Jolanio Guterres	East Timor	25 April 2025	67th MILO/MAS Malaysia Open Championships	Kuala Lumpur, Malaysia	
4×100 m freestyle relay								
4×200 m freestyle relay								
4×100 m medley relay								

Legend: # – Record awaiting ratification by National Swimming Federation of Timor Leste; WR – World record; AS – Asian record;
Records not set in finals: h – heat; sf – semifinal; r – relay 1st leg; rh – relay heat 1st leg; b – B final; † – en route to final mark; tt – time trial

=== Women ===
Event	Time		Name	Club	Date	Meet	Location	Ref
50 m freestyle	32.57	h	Imelda Ximenes Belo	East Timor	28 September 2023	Asian Games	Hangzhou, China	
100 m freestyle	1:13.45	h	Felicyta Imelda	East Timor	14 May 2022	Southeast Asian Games	Hanoi, Vietnam	
200 m freestyle	3:00.04	†	Felicyta Imelda	East Timor	15 May 2022	Southeast Asian Games	Hanoi, Vietnam	
400 m freestyle	6:12.18	†	Felicyta Imelda	East Timor	15 May 2022	Southeast Asian Games	Hanoi, Vietnam	
800 m freestyle	12:32.99		Felicyta Imelda	East Timor	15 May 2022	Southeast Asian Games	Hanoi, Vietnam	
1500 m freestyle								
50m backstroke								
100m backstroke								
200 m backstroke								
50m breaststroke								
100 m breaststroke								
200 m breaststroke								
50m butterfly								
100 m butterfly								
200 m butterfly								
200m individual medley								
400 m individual medley								
4×100 m freestyle relay								
4×200 m freestyle relay								
4×100 m medley relay								

Legend: # – Record awaiting ratification by National Swimming Federation of Timor Leste; WR – World record; AS – Asian record;
Records not set in finals: h – heat; sf – semifinal; r – relay 1st leg; rh – relay heat 1st leg; b – B final; † – en route to final mark; tt – time trial

== Short Course (25 m) ==
=== Men ===
Event	Time		Name	Club	Date	Meet	Location	Ref
50m freestyle	28.27	h	Jolanio Guterres	East Timor	14 December 2024	World Championships	Budapest, Hungary	
100m freestyle	1:04.39	h	Jolanio Guterres	East Timor	11 December 2024	World Championships	Budapest, Hungary	
200 m freestyle								
400 m freestyle								
800 m freestyle								
1500 m freestyle								
50 m backstroke								
100 m backstroke								
200 m backstroke								
50 m breaststroke								
100 m breaststroke								
200 m breaststroke								
50 m butterfly								
100 m butterfly								
200 m butterfly								
100 m individual medley								
200 m individual medley								
400 m individual medley								
4×50 m freestyle relay								
4×100 m freestyle relay								
4×200 m freestyle relay								
4×50 m medley relay								
4×100 m medley relay								

Legend: # – Record awaiting ratification by National Swimming Federation of Timor Leste; WR – World record; AS – Asian record;
Records not set in finals: h – heat; sf – semifinal; r – relay 1st leg; rh – relay heat 1st leg; b – B final; † – en route to final mark; tt – time trial

=== Women ===
Event	Time		Name	Club	Date	Meet	Location	Ref
50 m freestyle	32.74	h	Imelda Ximenes Belo	East Timor	20 December 2021	World Championships	Abu Dhabi, United Arab Emirates	
100 m freestyle	1:15.12	h	Imelda Ximenes Belo	East Timor	17 December 2021	World Championships	Abu Dhabi, United Arab Emirates	
200 m freestyle								
400 m freestyle								
800 m freestyle								
1500 m freestyle								
50 m backstroke								
100 m backstroke								
200 m backstroke								
50 m breaststroke								
100 m breaststroke								
200 m breaststroke								
50 m butterfly								
100 m butterfly								
200 m butterfly								
100 m individual medley								
200 m individual medley								
400 m individual medley								
4×50 m freestyle relay								
4×100 m freestyle relay								
4×200 m freestyle relay								
4×50 m medley relay								
4×100 m medley relay								

Legend: # – Record awaiting ratification by National Swimming Federation of Timor Leste; WR – World record; AS – Asian record;
Records not set in finals: h – heat; sf – semifinal; r – relay 1st leg; rh – relay heat 1st leg; b – B final; † – en route to final mark; tt – time trial
