= Guinea at the 2017 World Aquatics Championships =

- Flag of Guinea
- FINA code: GUI
- National federation: Federation Guineénne de Natation et Sauvetagé

in Budapest, Hungary
- Competitors: 3 in 1 sport
- Medals: Gold 0 Silver 0 Bronze 0 Total 0

World Aquatics Championships appearances
- 1973; 1975; 1978; 1982; 1986; 1991; 1994; 1998; 2001; 2003; 2005; 2007; 2009; 2011; 2013; 2015; 2017; 2019; 2022; 2023; 2024

Guinea competed at the 2017 World Aquatics Championships in Budapest, Hungary from 14 July to 30 July.

== Swimming ==
Guinea received a Universality invitation from FINA to send three swimmers (two men and one woman) to the World Championships.

Athlete	Event	Heat		Semifinal		Final	
Athlete	Event	Time	Rank	Time	Rank	Time	Rank
Alpha Diallo	Men's 100 m breaststroke	DNS		Did not advance			
Oumar Kaba	Men's 50 m freestyle	DNS		Did not advance			
Oumar Kaba	Men's 100 m freestyle	DNS		Did not advance			
Fatoumata Conde	Women's 50 m breaststroke	53.04	52	Did not advance			
