= Antigua and Barbuda at the 2013 World Aquatics Championships =

- Flag of Antigua and Barbuda
- FINA code: ANT
- National federation: Antigua and Barbuda Amateur Swimming Association

in Barcelona, Spain
- Competitors: 3 in 1 sport
- Medals: Gold 0 Silver 0 Bronze 0 Total 0

World Aquatics Championships appearances
- 1973; 1975; 1978; 1982; 1986; 1991; 1994; 1998; 2001; 2003; 2005; 2007; 2009; 2011; 2013; 2015; 2017; 2019; 2022; 2023; 2024

Antigua and Barbuda competed at the 2013 World Aquatics Championships in Barcelona, Spain from 19 July to 4 August.

== Swimming ==
Antigua and Barbudan swimmers achieved qualifying standards in the following events (up to a maximum of 2 swimmers in each event at the A-standard entry time, and 1 at the B-standard):

Men

Athlete	Event	Heat		Semifinal		Final	
Athlete	Event	Time	Rank	Time	Rank	Time	Rank
Noah Mascoll-Gomes	50 m butterfly	28.71	73	did not advance			
J'Air Smith	50 m freestyle	26.04	67	did not advance			
J'Air Smith	100 m breaststroke	1:14.70	72	did not advance			

Women

Athlete	Event	Heat		Semifinal		Final	
Athlete	Event	Time	Rank	Time	Rank	Time	Rank
Rachel Wall	50 m freestyle	30.14	69	did not advance			
Rachel Wall	100 m freestyle	1:08.43	67	did not advance			
