= Guinea at the 2019 World Aquatics Championships =

- Flag of Guinea
- FINA code: GUI
- National federation: Fédération Guinéenne de Natation et Sauvetage

in Gwangju, South Korea
- Competitors: 3 in 1 sport
- Medals: Gold 0 Silver 0 Bronze 0 Total 0

World Aquatics Championships appearances
- 1973; 1975; 1978; 1982; 1986; 1991; 1994; 1998; 2001; 2003; 2005; 2007; 2009; 2011; 2013; 2015; 2017; 2019; 2022; 2023; 2024

Guinea competed at the 2019 World Aquatics Championships in Gwangju, South Korea from 12 to 28 July.

== Swimming ==
Guinea entered three swimmers.

Men

Athlete	Event	Heat		Semifinal		Final	
Athlete	Event	Time	Rank	Time	Rank	Time	Rank
Mamadou Bah	50 m freestyle	27.91	120	Did not advance			
Mamadou Bah	100 m freestyle	1:05.54	118	Did not advance			
Yaya Yeressa	50 m breaststroke	34.71	70	Did not advance			
Yaya Yeressa	100 m breaststroke	1:19.66	85	Did not advance			

Women

Athlete	Event	Heat		Semifinal		Final	
Athlete	Event	Time	Rank	Time	Rank	Time	Rank
Mariana Touré	50 m breaststroke	44.35	52	Did not advance			
Mariana Touré	100 m breaststroke	DNS		Did not advance			
