= Djibouti at the 2024 World Aquatics Championships =

- Flag of Djibouti
- FINA code: DJI
- National federation: Fédération Djiboutienne de Natation

in Doha, Qatar
- Competitors: 2 in 1 sport
- Medals: Gold 0 Silver 0 Bronze 0 Total 0

World Aquatics Championships appearances
- 2009; 2011; 2013; 2015; 2017; 2019; 2022; 2023; 2024

Djibouti competed at the 2024 World Aquatics Championships in Doha, Qatar from 2 to 18 February.

== Competitors ==
The following is the list of competitors in the Championships.

Sport	Men	Women	Total
Swimming	1	1	2
Total	1	1	2

== Swimming ==
Djibouti entered 2 swimmers.

Men

Athlete	Event	Heat		Semifinal		Final	
Athlete	Event	Time	Rank	Time	Rank	Time	Rank
Houmed Houssein	50 metre freestyle	25.80	86	Did not advance			
Houmed Houssein	50 metre butterfly	28.72	58	Did not advance			

Women

Athlete	Event	Heat		Semifinal		Final	
Athlete	Event	Time	Rank	Time	Rank	Time	Rank
Nina Amison	50 metre freestyle	33.99	102	Did not advance			
Nina Amison	50 metre breaststroke	45.87	40	Did not advance			
