= Djibouti (anthem) =

National anthem of Djibouti

- National anthem of Djibouti
- Lyrics: Aden Elmi, 1977
- Music: Abdi Robleh, 1977
- Adopted: 1977; 49 years ago

Audio sample
- U.S. Navy Band instrumental rendition of the intro, prior to the start of the lyrics: file; help

"Djibouti" (Somali: Jabuuti, Afar: Gabuuti, Arabic: جيبوتي, romanized: Jibuti) is the national anthem of Djibouti. Adopted upon independence from France in 1977, the lyrics, which are in Somali, were written by Aden Elmi, while the melody was composed by Abdi Robleh.

The anthem was first officially played at an independence ceremony on 27 June 1977.

== Music ==
The melody is written in common 4/4 time. It consists of twenty measures.

== Lyrics ==
Band and choral vocal recording in Somali

Somali lyrics

Hinjinne u sara kaca
Calankaan harraad iyo
𝄆 Haydaar u mudateen! 𝄇

Hir cagaarku qariyayiyo
Habkay samadu tahayoo
Xiddig dhi igleh hoorshoo
Caddaan lagu hadheeyaay.

𝄆 Maxaa haybad kugu yaal.
Maxaa haybad kugu yaal. 𝄇

Somali IPA transcription (Note: See Help:IPA, Somali Latin alphabet and Somali phonology.)

[hin.d͡ʒin.ne u sæ.ræ kæ.ʕɑ]
[ʕæ.læn.kɑːn hær.ræːd i.jɞ]
𝄆 [hɑj.dɑːr u mu.dæ.teːn] 𝄇

[hɪr ʕɑ.gɑːr.ku qɑ.ri(.jæ).ji.jɔ]
[hɑb.kæj sæ.mɑ.du tæ.hæ.jɞː]
[ħɪd.dig ɖi‿ig.lɛh hɞːr.ʃɞː]
[ʕæd.dæːn læ.gu hæ.ɖeː.jɑːj]

𝄆 [mɑ.ħɑː hɑj.bæd ku.gu jæːl]
[mɑ.ħɑː hɑj.bæd ku.gu jæːl] 𝄇

Afar lyrics

Soolisnuh inkih solaa (Note: Sometimes written Doogehiik inkih soola ([doː.ge.hiːk iŋ.kih soː.la]).)
Simbiliiy (Note: Sometimes written Afar: Simbiliy ([sim.bi.lij]).) kah ningicle
𝄆 Bakaarat kah sugunne! 𝄇

Bulci kaak qaran sido
Way gubi kak anxar lusa (Note: Sometimes written Afar: Gubi kak way anxar lusa ([gu.bi kʌk wʌj ʌn.ɖʌɾ lu.sʌ]).)
Cutukti caxte caydu
Qidi wagri silaalo.

𝄆 Faylay heebati kumuu. (Note: Sometimes written Afar: Maysooy heebati kuumu ([mʌj.soːj heː.bʌ.ti kuː.mu]).)
Faylay heebati kumuu. 𝄇

Afar IPA transcription (Note: See Help:IPA and Afar language § Phonology.)

[soː.lis.nuh iŋ.kih so.laː]
[sim.bi.liːj kʌh niŋ.giħ.leʰ]
𝄆 [bʌ.kaː.ɾʌt kʌh su.gun.ne] 𝄇

[bul.ħi kaːk ʕʌ.ɾʌn si.do]
[wʌj gu.bi kʌk ʌn.ɖʌɾ lu.sʌ]
[ħu.tuk.ti ħʌɖ.te ħʌj.du]
[ʕi.di wʌg.ɾi si.laː.lo]

𝄆 [fʌj.lʌj heː.bʌ.ti ku.muː]
[fʌj.lʌj heː.bʌ.ti ku.muː] 𝄇

English translation

Arise with strength! For we have raised our flag,
The flag which has cost us dear
𝄆 With extremes of thirst and pain. 𝄇

Our flag, whose colours are the everlasting green of the earth,
The blue of the sky, and white, the colour of peace;
And in the centre the red star of blood.

𝄆 Oh flag of ours, what a glorious sight!
Oh flag of ours, what a glorious sight! 𝄇

French translation

Lève-toi avec force ! Parce que nous avons hissé notre drapeau,
Le drapeau qui nous a coûté cher
𝄆 Avec une soif et une douleur extrêmes. 𝄇

Notre drapeau, dont les couleurs sont le vert éternel de la terre,
Le bleu du ciel et le blanc, la couleur de la paix;
Et dans le centre de l'étoile rouge de sang.

𝄆 Oh notre drapeau, quel spectacle magnifique !
Oh notre drapeau, quel spectacle magnifique ! 𝄇

Arabic translation

انهضوا بقوة إلى حيث رفعنا رايتنا
تلك الراية التي كلفتنا الغالي والنفيس
𝄇 مع مزيد من العطش والألم 𝄆

رايتنا بألوانها التي أخذت أبد الدهر،
أخضرها من الأرض، وأزرقها من السماء؛
والأبيض لون السلام، وسطه النجم الأحمر بلون الدم

𝄇 يا رايتنا، كم تبعثين على الفخر
يا رايتنا، كم تبعثين على الفخر 𝄆

== See also ==
- History of Djibouti
- Flag of Djibouti
