= List of Djiboutian records in swimming =

The Djiboutian records in swimming are the fastest ever performances of swimmers from Djibouti, which are recognised and ratified by the Fédération Djiboutienne de Natation.

All records were set in finals unless noted otherwise.

== Long Course (50 m) ==
=== Men ===
Event	Time		Name	Club	Date	Meet	Location	Ref
50 m freestyle	25.27	h	Houmed Barkat	Club Des Nageurs De Paris	7 February 2026	CNO Meeting	Saint-Germain-En-Laye, France	
100 m freestyle	56.22	h	Houmed Barkat	Djibouti	30 July 2025	World Championships	Singapore, Singapore	
200 m freestyle								
400 m freestyle								
800 m freestyle								
1500 m freestyle								
50 m backstroke	30.68	h	Houmed Barkat	Club Des Nageurs De Paris	6 February 2026	CNO Meeting	Saint-Germain-En-Laye, France	
100 m backstroke	1:12.17	h	Houmed Barkat	Djibouti	12 March 2024	African Games	Accra, Ghana	
200 m backstroke								
50 m breaststroke	34.93	h	Mohamed Abdourahman	Djibouti	30 July 2013	World Championships	Barcelona, Spain	
100 m breaststroke								
200 m breaststroke								
50 m butterfly	26.94	h	Houmed Houssein Barkat	Djibouti	17 May 2025	Mare Nostrum	Monte Carlo, Monaco	
100 m butterfly	1:11.67	h	Houmed Houssein Barkat	Djibouti	13 August 2022	Islamic Solidarity Games	Konya, Turkey	
200 m butterfly								
200 m individual medley								
400 m individual medley								
4×100 m freestyle relay								
4×200 m freestyle relay								
4×100 m medley relay								

Legend: # – Record awaiting ratification by Fédération Djiboutienne de Natation; WR – World record; AF – African record; e – equalled existing record;
Records not set in finals: h – heat; sf – semifinal; r – relay 1st leg; rh – relay heat 1st leg; b – B final; † – en route to final mark; so – swim-off; tt – time trial

=== Women ===
Event	Time		Name	Club	Date	Meet	Location	Ref
50 m freestyle	37.16	h	Safia Houssein Barkat	Djibouti	27 July 2019	World Championships	Gwangju, South Korea	
100 m freestyle								
200 m freestyle								
400 m freestyle								
800 m freestyle								
1500 m freestyle								
50 m backstroke								
100 m backstroke								
200 m backstroke								
50 m breaststroke	48.58	h	Safia Houssein Barkat	Djibouti	21 August 2019	African Games	Casablanca, Morocco	
100 m breaststroke								
200 m breaststroke								
50 m butterfly								
100 m butterfly								
200 m butterfly								
200 m individual medley								
400 m individual medley								
4×100 m freestyle relay								
4×200 m freestyle relay								
4×100 m medley relay								

Legend: # – Record awaiting ratification by Fédération Djiboutienne de Natation; WR – World record; AF – African record; e – equalled existing record;
Records not set in finals: h – heat; sf – semifinal; r – relay 1st leg; rh – relay heat 1st leg; b – B final; † – en route to final mark; so – swim-off; tt – time trial

== Short Course (25 m) ==
=== Men ===
Event	Time		Name	Club	Date	Meet	Location	Ref
50 m freestyle	24.41	r	Houmed Barkat	Club Des Nageurs De Paris	7 November 2026	Regional Interclub TC Championships - Group A	Paris, France	
100 m freestyle	56.77	h	Houmed Houssein Barkat	Djibouti	11 December 2024	World Championships	Budapest, Hungary	
200 m freestyle								
400 m freestyle								
800 m freestyle								
1500 m freestyle								
50 m backstroke	30.36	h	Houmed Barkat	Club Des Nageurs De Paris	1 February 2026	Challenge Series - Finales	Paris, France	
100 m backstroke								
200 m backstroke								
50 m breaststroke	37.02	h	Houmed Houssein Barkat	Djibouti	20 December 2021	World Championships	Abu Dhabi, United Arab Emirates	
100 m breaststroke								
200 m breaststroke								
50 m butterfly	26.63	h	Houmed Barkat	Club Des Nageurs De Paris	31 January 2026	Challenge Series - Finales	Paris, France	
100 m butterfly	1:02.12	h	Ahmed Mohamed Abro Borhane	Djibouti	12 December 2012	World Championships	Istanbul, Turkey	
200 m butterfly								
100 m individual medley								
200 m individual medley								
400 m individual medley								
4×50 m freestyle relay								
4×100 m freestyle relay								
4×200 m freestyle relay								
4×50 m medley relay								
4×100 m medley relay								

Legend: # – Record awaiting ratification by Fédération Djiboutienne de Natation; WR – World record; AF – African record; e – equalled existing record;
Records not set in finals: h – heat; sf – semifinal; r – relay 1st leg; rh – relay heat 1st leg; b – B final; † – en route to final mark; so – swim-off; tt – time trial

=== Women ===
Event	Time		Name	Club	Date	Meet	Location	Ref
50 m freestyle	33.61		Naima-Zahra Amison	Djibouti	25 November 2023	Africa Aquatics Zone III Championships	Kigali, Rwanda	
100 m freestyle	1:25.01	h	Naima-Zahra Amison	Djibouti	17 December 2021	World Championships	Abu Dhabi, United Arab Emirates	
200 m freestyle								
400 m freestyle								
800 m freestyle								
1500 m freestyle								
50 m backstroke								
100 m backstroke								
200 m backstroke								
50 m breaststroke								
100 m breaststroke								
200 m breaststroke								
50 m butterfly								
100 m butterfly								
200 m butterfly								
100 m individual medley								
200 m individual medley								
400 m individual medley								
4×50 m freestyle relay								
4×100 m freestyle relay								
4×200 m freestyle relay								
4×50 m medley relay								
4×100 m medley relay								

Legend: # – Record awaiting ratification by Fédération Djiboutienne de Natation; WR – World record; AF – African record; e – equalled existing record;
Records not set in finals: h – heat; sf – semifinal; r – relay 1st leg; rh – relay heat 1st leg; b – B final; † – en route to final mark; so – swim-off; tt – time trial
