= Djibouti at the 2017 World Aquatics Championships =

- Flag of Djibouti
- FINA code: DJI
- National federation: Federation Djiboutienne de Natation

in Budapest, Hungary
- Competitors: 2 in 1 sport
- Medals: Gold 0 Silver 0 Bronze 0 Total 0

World Aquatics Championships appearances
- 2009; 2011; 2013; 2015; 2017; 2019; 2022; 2023; 2024

Djibouti competed at the 2017 World Aquatics Championships in Budapest, Hungary from 14 July to 30 July.

== Swimming ==
Djibouti has received a Universality invitation from FINA to send two swimmers (one man and one woman) to the World Championships.

Athlete	Event	Heat		Semifinal		Final	
Athlete	Event	Time	Rank	Time	Rank	Time	Rank
Houssein Gaber	Men's 50 m freestyle	28.86	116	did not advance			
Houssein Gaber	Men's 50 m breaststroke	40.55	81	did not advance			
Safia Houssein Barkat	Women's 50 m freestyle	39.59	86	did not advance			
