= Guinea at the 2011 World Aquatics Championships =

- Flag of Guinea
- FINA code: GUI
- National federation: Federation Guineénne de Natation et Sauvetagé

in Shanghai, China
- Competitors: 3 in 1 sports
- Medals: Gold 0 Silver 0 Bronze 0 Total 0

World Aquatics Championships appearances
- 1973; 1975; 1978; 1982; 1986; 1991; 1994; 1998; 2001; 2003; 2005; 2007; 2009; 2011; 2013; 2015; 2017; 2019; 2022; 2023; 2024

Guinea competed at the 2011 World Aquatics Championships in Shanghai, China between July 16 and 31, 2011.

== Swimming ==
Guinea qualified 3 swimmers.

Men

Athlete	Event	Heats		Semifinals		Final	
Athlete	Event	Time	Rank	Time	Rank	Time	Rank
Amadou Camara	Men's 50m Freestyle	29.72	107	did not advance			
Amadou Camara	Men's 100m Freestyle	1:06.25	101	did not advance			
Mohamed Camara	Men's 50m Breaststroke	DSQ		did not advance			
Mohamed Camara	Men's 100m Breaststroke	DSQ		did not advance			

Women

Athlete	Event	Heats		Semifinals		Final	
Athlete	Event	Time	Rank	Time	Rank	Time	Rank
Dede Camara	Women's 50m Breaststroke	44.44	31	did not advance			
Dede Camara	Women's 100m Breaststroke	1:40.16	46	did not advance			
