= Guinea at the 2013 World Aquatics Championships =

- Flag of Guinea
- FINA code: GUI
- National federation: Federation Guineénne de Natation et Sauvetagé

in Barcelona, Spain
- Competitors: 3 in 1 sports
- Medals: Gold 0 Silver 0 Bronze 0 Total 0

World Aquatics Championships appearances
- 1973; 1975; 1978; 1982; 1986; 1991; 1994; 1998; 2001; 2003; 2005; 2007; 2009; 2011; 2013; 2015; 2017; 2019; 2022; 2023; 2024

Guinea competed at the 2013 World Aquatics Championships in Barcelona, Spain between 19 July and 4 August 2013.

== Swimming ==
Guinean swimmers achieved qualifying standards in the following events (up to a maximum of 2 swimmers in each event at the A-standard entry time, and 1 at the B-standard):

Men

Athlete	Event	Heat		Semifinal		Final	
Athlete	Event	Time	Rank	Time	Rank	Time	Rank
Ibrahima Camara	50 m freestyle	27.46	=86	did not advance			
Ibrahima Camara	100 m freestyle	1:02.33	83	did not advance			
Mohamed Cheic Camara	50 m breaststroke	34.24	72	did not advance			
Mohamed Cheic Camara	100 m breaststroke	1:15.54	73	did not advance			

Women

Athlete	Event	Heat		Semifinal		Final	
Athlete	Event	Time	Rank	Time	Rank	Time	Rank
Ramatoulaye Camara	50 m breaststroke	48.31	72	did not advance			
Ramatoulaye Camara	100 m breaststroke	1:43.41	=60	did not advance			
