= Guilherme Caribé =

Brazilian swimmer (born 2003)

Personal information
- Full name: Guilherme Caribé Oliveira Santos
- Born: 1 March 2003 (age 23) Salvador, Bahia, Brazil
- Height: 1.85 m (6 ft 1 in)
- Weight: 69 kg (152 lb)

Sport
- Sport: Swimming
- Strokes: Freestyle
- College team: Tennessee
Medal record
Men's swimming
Representing Brazil
World Championships (SC)
Silver medal – second place	2024 Budapest	50 m freestyle
Silver medal – second place	2024 Budapest	100 m freestyle
Pan Pacific Championships
Bronze medal – third place	2026 Irvine	50 m freestyle
Bronze medal – third place	2026 Irvine	100 m freestyle
Bronze medal – third place	2026 Irvine	50 m butterfly
Pan American Games
Gold medal – first place	2023 Santiago	100 m freestyle
Gold medal – first place	2023 Santiago	4×100 m freestyle
Gold medal – first place	2023 Santiago	4×100 m mixed free
Silver medal – second place	2023 Santiago	4×100 m medley
Junior Pan American Games
Gold medal – first place	2025 Asuncion	50 m freestyle
Gold medal – first place	2025 Asuncion	100 m freestyle
Gold medal – first place	2025 Asuncion	4x100 m freestyle relay
Gold medal – first place	2025 Asuncion	4x100 m mixed freestyle relay

Guilherme Caribé Oliveira Santos (born 2003 in Salvador) is a Brazilian swimmer. He is a gold medalist in the 100m freestyle at the 2023 Pan American Games, world runner-up in the short course in the 50m and 100m freestyle at the 2024 FINA World Short Course Swimming Championships, and 4th in the 100m freestyle at the 2025 FINA World Aquatics Championships.

== Career ==
At the 2021 South American Swimming Championships, he won a gold medal in the 4 × 100 m metre freestyle relay.

In 2022, he reached fourth place in the Brazilian adult ranking of all time after clocking 47.82 seconds in the 100 meter freestyle, behind only César Cielo (46.91), Marcelo Chierighini (47.68) and Nicolas Oliveira (47.78). In the same year, Caribé achieved a mark of 21.87 in the 50 meter freestyle, something that only Bruno Fratus, among Brazilians, had done in the last four years. Also in 2022, he received an invitation to study at the University of Tennessee.

He was at the 2023 World Aquatics Championships, where he finished 12th in the Men's 100 metre freestyle, 6th in the Men's 4 × 100 metre freestyle relay and 6th in the Mixed 4 × 100 metre freestyle relay.

At the 2023 Pan American Games, he won three gold medals: in the 100m freestyle, with a time of 48.06, reaching the Olympic index for the Paris Olympic Games in 2024; and in the men's 4x100m freestyle and mixed 4x100m freestyle relays of Brazil.

On May 9, 2024, competing in the Brazilian Olympic Swimming Trials, he ran a time of 47.95 in the 100m freestyle heats, guaranteeing his classification for Paris 2024. On May 11, in the same competition, he secured another Olympic place, now in the 50m freestyle, with a time of 21.88.

At the 2024 Olympic Games, he reached the semi-finals of the 100m freestyle, finishing in 10th place.

At the José Finkel Trophy, held in a short course pool, in August 2024, he won the 100m freestyle with a time of 45.78, four hundredths of a second away from equaling César Cielo's South American record.

At the 2024 World Aquatics Swimming Championships (25 m) held in Budapest in December 2024, he broke the South American record for the 100m freestyle, which belonged to César Cielo, obtaining silver with a time of 45.47. He later won another silver medal in the 50m freestyle. He also finished 5th in the 4 × 100 m freestyle relay.

In April 2025, at the Maria Lenk Trophy, he swam the 100 metre freestyle in 47.10, a time that placed him as the world leader at that time, and as the 10th fastest swimmer in the history of the event. This time would also have been enough to obtain the Olympic silver medal in Paris 2024. He also swam the 50m freestyle in 21.46, achieving the second best time in the world this season, only behind Russian Egor Kornev, who did 21.43. This time would be enough to obtain a bronze medal at the Paris 2024 Olympics. On the last day of competition, swimming the 50m butterfly, Caribé achieved a time of 22.95, fourth best in the world ranking in 2025.

At the 2025 World Aquatics Championships, Caribé started the competition by swimming the Men's 50 metre butterfly, and although it was not his main event, he reached the final after breaking his personal best, swimming in 22.91. Participating in an individual final at the Long Course World Championships for the first time, he finished in 8th place. In the Men's 100 metre freestyle, he achieved a great result, finishing in 4th place with a time of 47.35, 0.18s away from winning a medal, in the strongest final in the history of the event at the World Championships. He also swam the Men's 50 metre freestyle, where he missed out on the final by 1 hundredth of a second, finishing in 10th place with a time of 21.78.

At the 2026 Pan Pacific Swimming Championships, Caribé won three bronze medals: he won a bronze medal in the 50m butterfly, clocking a career-best time of 22.88, and two other medals in the 50m freestyle and 100m freestyle events.

== Personal bests ==
As of August 12, 2026

Long course
Event	Time	Meet	Date	Note(s)
50 m freestyle	21.46	2025 Maria Lenk Trophy	25 April 2025	
100 m freestyle	47.10	2025 Maria Lenk Trophy	23 April 2025	
50 m butterfly	22.88	2026 Pan Pacific Swimming Championships	12 August 2026	

Short course
Event	Time	Meet	Date	Note(s)
50 m freestyle	20.57	2024 World Championships	December 15, 2024	
100 m freestyle	45.47	2024 World Championships	December 12, 2024	SA
