= Guinea at the 2015 World Aquatics Championships =

- Flag of Guinea
- FINA code: GUI
- National federation: Federation Guineénne de Natation et Sauvetagé

in Kazan, Russia
- Competitors: 3 in 1 sport
- Medals: Gold 0 Silver 0 Bronze 0 Total 0

World Aquatics Championships appearances
- 1973; 1975; 1978; 1982; 1986; 1991; 1994; 1998; 2001; 2003; 2005; 2007; 2009; 2011; 2013; 2015; 2017; 2019; 2022; 2023; 2024

Guinea competed at the 2015 World Aquatics Championships in Kazan, Russia from 24 July to 9 August 2015.

== Swimming ==
Guinean swimmers have achieved qualifying standards in the following events (up to a maximum of 2 swimmers in each event at the A-standard entry time, and 1 at the B-standard):

Men

Athlete	Event	Heat		Semifinal		Final	
Athlete	Event	Time	Rank	Time	Rank	Time	Rank
Amadou Camara	50 m freestyle	26.99	91	Did not advance			
Amadou Camara	100 m freestyle	1:04.00	114	Did not advance			
Alhassane Fofana	50 m breaststroke	DNS		Did not advance			
Alhassane Fofana	100 m breaststroke	DNS		Did not advance			

Women

Athlete	Event	Heat		Semifinal		Final	
Athlete	Event	Time	Rank	Time	Rank	Time	Rank
Mariama Sow	50 m freestyle	44.59	111	Did not advance			
Mariama Sow	50 m breaststroke	52.65	71	Did not advance			
