= Djibouti at the 2011 World Aquatics Championships =

- Flag of Djibouti
- FINA code: DJI
- National federation: Federation Djiboutienne de Natation

in Shanghai, China
- Competitors: 3 in 1 sports
- Medals: Gold 0 Silver 0 Bronze 0 Total 0

World Aquatics Championships appearances
- 2009; 2011; 2013; 2015; 2017; 2019; 2022; 2023; 2024

Djibouti competed at the 2011 World Aquatics Championships in Shanghai, China between July 16 and 31, 2011.

== Swimming ==
Djibouti qualified 3 swimmers.

Men

| Athlete | Event | Heats | | Semifinals | | Final | |
| Athlete | Event | Time | Rank | Time | Rank | Time | Rank |
|---|---|---|---|---|---|---|---|
| Abdoulrahman Mohamed Osman | Men's 50m Freestyle | 27.69 | 88 | did not advance | | | |
| Abdoulrahman Mohamed Osman | Men's 50m Breaststroke | 37.60 | 46 | did not advance | | | |
| Iourhanta Mohamed Osman | Men's 50m Freestyle | 31.79 | 110 | did not advance | | | |
| Iourhanta Mohamed Osman | Men's 50m Breaststroke | 43.37 | 49 | did not advance | | | |

Women

| Athlete | Event | Heats | | Semifinals | | Final | |
| Athlete | Event | Time | Rank | Time | Rank | Time | Rank |
|---|---|---|---|---|---|---|---|
| Aicha Hassan Abdillahi | Women's 50m Freestyle | 38.38 | 82 | did not advance | | | |
