= Darýa Semýonowa =

Turkmenistan swimmer

Personal information
- Born: 28 May 2002 (age 24) Ashgabat, Turkmenistan

Sport
- Sport: Swimming

Darýa Semýonowa (born 28 May 2002) is a Turkmenistan swimmer. She competed in the women's 100 metre breaststroke event at the 2016 Summer Olympics. In 2019, she represented Turkmenistan at the 2019 World Aquatics Championships in Gwangju, South Korea. She competed in the women's 50 metre breaststroke and women's 100 metre breaststroke events.
