= Antigua and Barbuda at the 2011 World Aquatics Championships =

- Flag of Antigua and Barbuda
- FINA code: ANT
- National federation: Antigua and Barbuda Amateur Swimming Association

in Shanghai, China
- Competitors: 3 in 1 sport
- Medals: Gold 0 Silver 0 Bronze 0 Total 0

World Aquatics Championships appearances
- 1973; 1975; 1978; 1982; 1986; 1991; 1994; 1998; 2001; 2003; 2005; 2007; 2009; 2011; 2013; 2015; 2017; 2019; 2022; 2023; 2024

Antigua and Barbuda competed at the 2011 World Aquatics Championships in Shanghai, China between 16 and 31 July.

== Swimming ==
Antigua and Barbuda qualified 3 swimmers.

Men

Athlete	Event	Heats		Semifinals		Final	
Athlete	Event	Time	Rank	Time	Rank	Time	Rank
Jeffrey Orel	50 m freestyle	28.57	97	did not advance			
Kyle Zreibe	100 m freestyle	1:07.35	102	did not advance			
Kyle Zreibe	50 m butterfly	36.25	54	did not advance			

Women

Athlete	Event	Heats		Semifinals		Final	
Athlete	Event	Time	Rank	Time	Rank	Time	Rank
Karin O'Reilly Clashing	50 m freestyle	31.41	68	did not advance			
Karin O'Reilly Clashing	50 m butterfly	36.87	49	did not advance			
