= Ellie Shaw =

Antiguan swimmer (born 2008)

Personal information
- National team: Antigua and Barbuda
- Born: August 10, 2008 (age 17)

Sport
- Event: Women's 100 meter breaststroke

Achievements and titles
- World finals: 2024 Summer Olympics

Ellie Shaw (born 10 August 2008) is an Antiguan swimmer. She competed at the 2024 Summer Olympics in the women's 100m breaststroke, but was eliminated in the first heat. Shaw was Antigua and Barbuda's 2023 Junior Sportswoman of the Year.
