= Noah Mascoll-Gomes =

Antigua and Barbuda swimmer (born 1999)

Personal information
- Nationality: Antiguan/Canadian
- Born: 27 May 1999 (age 27)
- Height: 175 cm (5 ft 9 in)
- Weight: 75 kg (165 lb)

Sport
- Country: Antigua and Barbuda
- Sport: Swimming

Noah Ken Anthony Mascoll-Gomes (born 27 May 1999) is an Antigua and Barbuda competitive swimmer. He competed at the 2016 Summer Olympics in Rio de Janeiro, in the men's 200 metre freestyle. He finished 44th in the heats and did not advance to the semifinals. He was the flag bearer for Antigua and Barbuda in the closing ceremony.
