= Elhadj N'Gnane Diallo =

Guinean swimmer (born 2003)

Personal information
- Born: June 15, 2003 (age 23)

Sport
- Sport: Swimming

Elhadj N'Gnane Diallo (born 15 June 2003) is a Guinean swimmer. He competed in the men's 50 metre freestyle event at the 2024 Summer Olympics, but didn't advance past the heats.
