= Houmed Houssein Barkat =

Djiboutian swimmer

Personal information
- Born: April 4, 2004 (age 22)

Sport
- Sport: Swimming

Houmed Houssein Barkat (born 4 April 2004) is a Djiboutian swimmer. He competed in the men's 50 metre freestyle event at the 2024 Summer Olympics, but didn't advance past the heats.
