= Flag of Guinea =

Republic of Guinea
- Use: National flag and ensign
- Proportion: 2:3
- Adopted: 10 November 1958; 68 years ago
- Design: A vertical tricolour of red, yellow and green

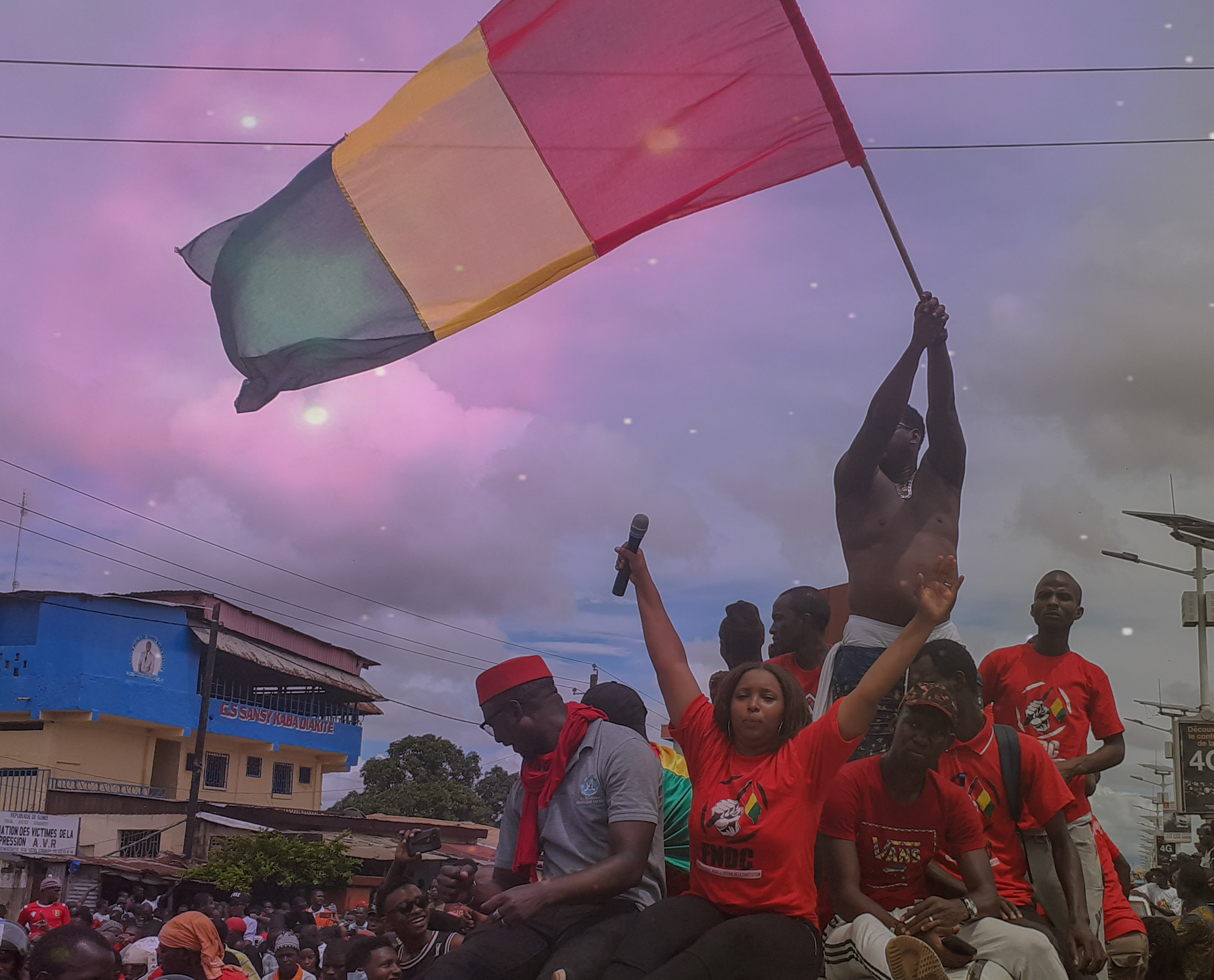
Protesters with Guinean flag at the 2019–2020 Guinean protests

The national flag of Guinea (French: drapeau national de la Guinée) is a triband of red, yellow, and green. It was adopted on 10 November 1958, with the publication of the country's first Constitution. It uses the Pan-African colours, partly as a nod to the flag of Ghana, whose president was a close associate of Sekou Toure, the first Guinean president. It is a tricolour resembling the flag of France, its former coloniser.

== Design ==
The colors of the flag were adapted from those of the Rassemblement Démocratique Africain, the dominant movement at the time of independence. The colors were in turn derived from those of the flag of Ghana, which had first adopted them in 1957. Sékou Touré, the first President of Guinea, was a close associate of Kwame Nkrumah, the former president of Ghana.

=== Colors ===
According to Sékou Touré, first President of Guinea, the three colors of the flag represent the following: red symbolizes the blood of anti-colonialist martyrs, the labor of the working classes, and the wish for progress; yellow represents Guinean gold, as well as the sun, which is "the source of energy, generosity and equality for all men to which he gives light equally"; and green represents the country's vegetation, continued prosperity arising from its natural resources, and the historically difficult life of the Guinean masses who live in the countryside. In turn, the symbolism behind each of the three colors corresponds to the three components of the national motto: Travail, Justice, Solidarité ("Work, Justice, Solidarity").

In keeping with other flags in the region, the Pan-African movement's colors of red, yellow, and green are used.

The design is a tricolor. The colors of the flag from left to right are the reverse of the flag of Mali. The previous flag of Rwanda (in use from 1961 to 2001), the design of which was inspired by the flag of the Kingdom of Rwanda, had a large black R to distinguish it from the near-identical flag of Guinea.

(1958–present)	Red	Yellow	Green
Refs			
Pantone	032 C	109 C	355 C
CMYK	0-0.92-0.82-0.19	0-0.17-0.91-0.01	1-0-0.35-0.42
RGB	206-17-38	252-209-22	0-148-96
Hexadecimal	#CE1126	#FCD116	#009460

== History ==
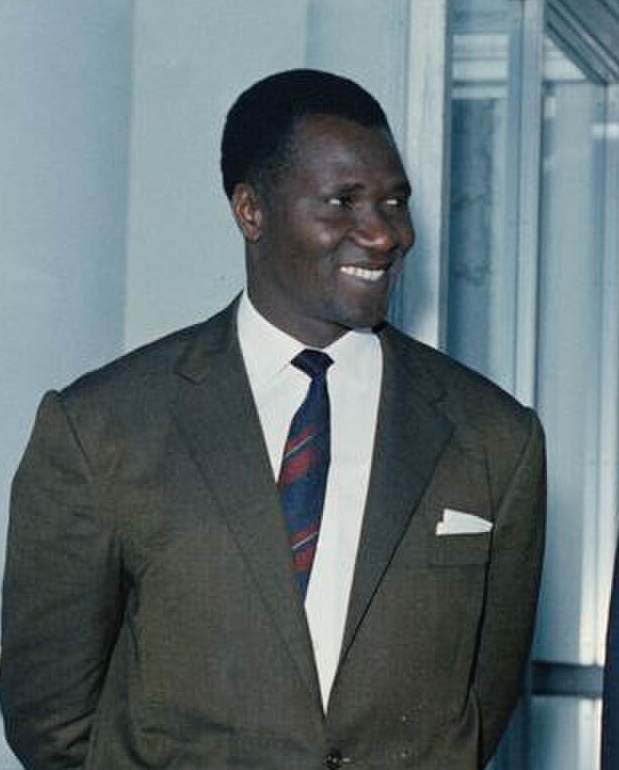
Sékou Touré, first president of Guinea

The Democratic Party of Guinea had been a key political organisation prior to Guinea's independence from France, and had been using the Pan-African colours of yellow, green and red for their organisations as early as 1954. In addition to these colours evoking the flags of other independent African countries, such as Ethiopia and Ghana, Sékou Touré, the first president of Guinea, who was also leader of the Democratic Party, stated they had their own symbolism specific to Guinea - red being the colour of blood, representing the sacrifice and labour of the country's people, including those who fought against colonialism; yellow representing the country's mineral wealth, the sun, and justice, and green representing agriculture and the country's potential wealth from those who work the soil.

Guinea was the only French colony in Africa that refused to remain under the French empire, when independence was given as an option by Charles de Gaulle. Though autonomous status was offered, Guinea chose to cut all ties with France, leading to the latter's complete withdrawal from the former, and the independence of Guinea on October 2, 1958. The flag was adopted on November 10 of the same year, with stripes that evoked the French tricolour.

Guinea joined with Ghana following independence to form the Union of African States, with a flag that used the same yellow-green-red colours as each country's respective flags, along with two black stars representing both countries. (A third was added when Mali joined in 1961).

The only legislation on the Guinean flag has stated that the stripes must be of equal width. The flag is a horizontal reversal of the current Malian national flag.

== Governmental flags ==
Presidential standard

== Historical flags ==
Flag of the Imamate of Futa Jallon (pre-1896)

Flag of the Imamate of Futa Jallon after becoming a French protectorate (1896–1912)

Samory Toure's flag (1898)

Flag of French Guinea (1912–1958)

Presidential standard of Guinea (1958–1984)

Presidential standard of Guinea (1984–1993)

== See also ==
- Flag of Bolivia, a rotated version of the flag
- Flag of Mali, a mirrored version of the flag
