= Stefano Mitchell =

Antigua and Barbuda swimmer (born 1999)

Personal information
- Born: 22 September 1999 (age 26) Toronto, Ontario, Canada

Sport
- Sport: Swimming

Stefano Mitchell (born 22 September 1999) is an Antigua and Barbuda swimmer. He competed in the men's 50 metre butterfly event at the 2017 World Aquatics Championships. In 2019, he represented Antigua and Barbuda at the 2019 World Aquatics Championships held in Gwangju, South Korea and he finished in 62nd place in the heats in the men's 50 metre freestyle event.

He competed in the men's 100 metre freestyle event at the 2020 Summer Olympics.

In 2018, Mitchell was named the Antigua and Barbuda Sportsman of the Year.

Awards
Preceded by Cejhae Greene	Antiguan and Barbudan Sportsman of The Year; 2018	Succeeded by Cejhae Greene
