= Libya at the 2025 World Aquatics Championships =

- Flag of Libya
- World Aquatics code: LBA
- National federation: Libyan Swimming Federation

in Singapore
- Competitors: 2 in 1 sport
- Medals: Gold 0 Silver 0 Bronze 0 Total 0

World Aquatics Championships appearances
- 1973; 1975; 1978; 1982; 1986; 1991; 1994; 1998; 2001; 2003; 2005; 2007; 2009; 2011; 2013; 2015; 2017; 2019; 2022; 2023; 2024; 2025

Libya is competing at the 2025 World Aquatics Championships in Singapore from 11 July to 3 August 2025.

== Competitors ==
The following is the list of competitors in the Championships.

Sport	Men	Women	Total
Swimming	2	0	2
Total	2	0	2

== Swimming ==
Men

Athlete	Event	Heat		Semifinal		Final	
Athlete	Event	Time	Rank	Time	Rank	Time	Rank
Mohammed Jibali	100 m freestyle	53.09	73	Did not advance			
Mohammed Jibali	200 m freestyle	1:58.97	53	Did not advance			
Anas Ganedi	50 m breaststroke	31.14	69	Did not advance			
Anas Ganedi	100 m breaststroke	1:09.89	69	Did not advance			
