= Rwanda at the 2025 World Aquatics Championships =

- Flag of Rwanda
- World Aquatics code: RWA
- National federation: Rwanda Swimming Federation

in Singapore
- Competitors: 4 in 1 sport
- Medals: Gold 0 Silver 0 Bronze 0 Total 0

World Aquatics Championships appearances
- 1973; 1975; 1978; 1982; 1986; 1991; 1994; 1998; 2001; 2003; 2005; 2007; 2009; 2011; 2013; 2015; 2017; 2019; 2022; 2023; 2024; 2025

Rwanda competed at the 2025 World Aquatics Championships in Singapore from July 11 to August 3, 2025.

== Competitors ==
The following is the list of competitors in the Championships.

Sport	Men	Women	Total
Swimming	2	2	4
Total	2	2	4

== Swimming ==
Rwanda entered 4 swimmers.

Men

Athlete	Event	Heat		Semi-final		Final	
Athlete	Event	Time	Rank	Time	Rank	Time	Rank
Kevin Kaiga	50 m freestyle	27.92	106	Did not advance			
Kevin Kaiga	100 m freestyle	1:01.68	100	Did not advance			
Oscar Peyre Mitilla	50 m butterfly	24.06	39	Did not advance			
Oscar Peyre Mitilla	100 m butterfly	54.44	48	Did not advance			

Women

Athlete	Event	Heat		Semi-final		Final	
Athlete	Event	Time	Rank	Time	Rank	Time	Rank
Kalisa Keza	50 m freestyle	33.95	96	Did not advance			
Kalisa Keza	50 m butterfly	40.00	80	Did not advance			
Aragsan Mugabo	100 m freestyle	1:09.21	78	Did not advance			
Aragsan Mugabo	50 m backstroke	36.65	63	Did not advance			

Mixed

Athlete	Event	Heat		Final	
Athlete	Event	Time	Rank	Time	Rank
Aragsan Mugabo; Kalisa Keza; Oscar Peyre Mitilla; Kevin Kaiga	4 × 100 m medley relay	5:08.50	37	Did not advance	
