= Iran at the 2025 World Aquatics Championships =

- Flag of Iran
- World Aquatics code: IRN
- National federation: I.R. Iran Amateur Swimming Federation
- Website: irsf.ir

in Singapore
- Competitors: 2 in 2 sports
- Medals: Gold 0 Silver 0 Bronze 0 Total 0

World Aquatics Championships appearances
- 1973; 1975; 1978; 1982; 1986; 1991; 1994; 1998; 2001; 2003; 2005; 2007; 2009; 2011; 2013; 2015; 2017; 2019; 2022; 2023; 2024; 2025

Iran is competing at the 2025 World Aquatics Championships in Singapore from 11 July to 3 August 2025.

== Competitors ==
The following is the list of competitors in the Championships.

Sport	Men	Women	Total
Diving	1	0	0
Swimming	1	0	0
Total	2	0	2

== Diving ==
Men

Athlete	Event	Preliminary		Semifinal		Final	
Athlete	Event	Points	Rank	Points	Rank	Points	Rank
Sam Vajerhelabad	1 m springboard	242.85	55	—		Did not advance	
Sam Vajerhelabad	3 m springboard	344.55	38	Did not advance			

== Swimming ==
Men

Athlete	Event	Heat		Semifinal		Final	
Athlete	Event	Time	Rank	Time	Rank	Time	Rank
Samyar Abdoli	50 m freestyle	22.41 NR	38	Did not advance			
Samyar Abdoli	50 m breaststroke	28.69	55	Did not advance			
