= Papua New Guinea at the 2025 World Aquatics Championships =

- Flag of Papua New Guinea
- World Aquatics code: PNG
- National federation: Papua New Guinea Swimming Federation

in Singapore
- Competitors: 4 in 1 sport
- Medals: Gold 0 Silver 0 Bronze 0 Total 0

World Aquatics Championships appearances
- 1973; 1975; 1978; 1982; 1986; 1991; 1994; 1998; 2001; 2003; 2005; 2007; 2009; 2011; 2013; 2015; 2017; 2019; 2022; 2023; 2024; 2025

Papua New Guinea competed at the 2025 World Aquatics Championships in Singapore from July 11 to August 3, 2025.

== Competitors ==
The following is the list of competitors in the Championships.

Sport	Men	Women	Total
Swimming	2	2	4
Total	2	2	4

== Swimming ==
Papua New Guinea entered 4 swimmers.

Men

Athlete	Event	Heat		Semi-final		Final	
Athlete	Event	Time	Rank	Time	Rank	Time	Rank
Nathaniel Noka	50 m breaststroke	33.47	74	Did not advance			
Nathaniel Noka	50 m butterfly	26.06	75	Did not advance			
Josh Tarere	50 m freestyle	24.73	82	Did not advance			
Josh Tarere	100 m freestyle	55.34	88	Did not advance			

Women

Athlete	Event	Heat		Semi-final		Final	
Athlete	Event	Time	Rank	Time	Rank	Time	Rank
Joanna Chen	50 m backstroke	34.80	62	Did not advance			
Joanna Chen	200 m individual medley	2:48.66	38	Did not advance			
Jhnayali Tokome-Garap	50 m freestyle	27.86	64	Did not advance			
Jhnayali Tokome-Garap	100 m freestyle	1:01.54	62	Did not advance			

Mixed

Athlete	Event	Heat		Final	
Athlete	Event	Time	Rank	Time	Rank
Josh Tarere; Nathaniel Noka; Jhnayali Tokome-Garap; Joanna Chen	4 × 100 m freestyle relay	Disqualified		Did not advance	
Josh Tarere; Nathaniel Noka; Jhnayali Tokome-Garap; Joanna Chen	4 × 100 m medley relay	4:43.43	36	Did not advance	
