= List of Rwandan records in swimming =

The Rwandan records in swimming are the fastest ever performances of swimmers from Rwanda, which are recognised and ratified by the Fedaration Rwandaise de Natation Amateur.

All records were set in finals unless noted otherwise.

== Long Course (50 m) ==
=== Men ===
Event	Time		Name	Club	Date	Meet	Location	Ref
50 m freestyle	23.93		Oscar Peyre	CN Antibes	21 March 2026	Giant Open	Saint-Denis, France	
100 m freestyle	56.18	h	Cedrick Niyibizi	Rwanda	26 July 2023	World Championships	Fukuoka, Japan	
200 m freestyle	2:10.18	h	Eric Iradukunda	Rwanda	30 April 2024	African Championships	Luanda, Angola	
400 m freestyle								
800 m freestyle	10:12.79		Eric Iradukunda	Rwanda	30 April 2024	African Championships	Luanda, Angola	
1500 m freestyle								
50 m backstroke	26.50		Oscar Peyre	CN Antibes	19 December 2025	Occitanie National Meeting	Nîmes, France	
100 m backstroke	57.44		Oscar Peyre	CN Antibes	21 December 2025	Occitanie National Meeting	Nîmes, France	
200 m backstroke	2:13.58		Oscar Peyre	C.N. Las Palmas	29 June 2025	Regional Summer Championships	Las Palmas de Gran Canaria, Spain	
50 m breaststroke	32.36	h	Isihaka Irankunda	Rwanda	11 September 2018	African Championships	Algiers, Algeria	
100 m breaststroke	1:11.44	h	Isihaka Irankunda	Rwanda	10 September 2018	African Championships	Algiers, Algeria	
200 m breaststroke								
50 m butterfly	23.92		Oscar Peyre	Rwanda	17 May 2025	Mare Nostrum	Monte Carlo, Monaco	
100 m butterfly	53.31	b	Oscar Peyre	CN Antibes	24 May 2026	Mare Nostrum	Monte Carlo, Monaco	
200 m butterfly								
200 m individual medley								
400 m individual medley								
4×50 m freestyle relay	1:56.95			Rwanda	19 October 2025	Africa Aquatics Zone III Championships	Nairobi, Kenya	
4×100 m freestyle relay	4:28.18			Rwanda	October 2025	Africa Aquatics Zone III Championships	Nairobi, Kenya	
4×200 m freestyle relay								
4×50 m medley relay	2:12.74			Rwanda	16 October 2025	Africa Aquatics Zone III Championships	Nairobi, Kenya	
4×100 m medley relay								

Legend: # – Record awaiting ratification by Fedaration Rwandaise de Natation Amateur; WR – World record; AF – African record; e – equalled existing record;
Records not set in finals: h – heat; sf – semifinal; r – relay 1st leg; rh – relay heat 1st leg; b – B final; † – en route to final mark; so – swim-off; tt – time trial

=== Women ===
Event	Time		Name	Club	Date	Meet	Location	Ref
50 m freestyle	30.50	h	Alphonsine Agahozo	Rwanda	30 July 2021	Olympic Games	Tokyo, Japan	
100 m freestyle	1:16.00	h	Lidwine Umuhoza Uwase	Rwanda	27 July 2017	World Championships	Budapest, Hungary	
200 m freestyle	2:51.01	h	Aragsan Mugabo	Rwanda	30 April 2024	African Championships	Luanda, Angola	
400 m freestyle								
800 m freestyle								
1500 m freestyle								
50 m backstroke								
100 m backstroke								
200 m backstroke								
50 m breaststroke	38.37	h, †	Alphonsine Agahozo	Rwanda	3 August 2015	World Championships	Kazan, Russia	
100 m breaststroke	1:27.80	h	Alphonsine Agahozo	Rwanda	3 August 2015	World Championships	Kazan, Russia	
200 m breaststroke								
50 m butterfly	33.35	h, †	Johanna Umurungi	Rwanda	2 August 2015	World Championships	Kazan, Russia	
100 m butterfly	1:11.92	h	Johanna Umurungi	Rwanda	6 August 2016	Olympic Games	Rio de Janeiro, Brazil	
200 m butterfly								
200 m individual medley								
400 m individual medley								
4×50 m freestyle relay	2:12.93			Rwanda	19 October 2025	Africa Aquatics Zone III Championships	Nairobi, Kenya	
4×100 m freestyle relay	5:06.84			Rwanda	October 2025	Africa Aquatics Zone III Championships	Nairobi, Kenya	
4×200 m freestyle relay								
4×50 m medley relay	2:36.24			Rwanda	16 October 2025	Africa Aquatics Zone III Championships	Nairobi, Kenya	
4×100 m medley relay								

Legend: # – Record awaiting ratification by Fedaration Rwandaise de Natation Amateur; WR – World record; AF – African record; e – equalled existing record;
Records not set in finals: h – heat; sf – semifinal; r – relay 1st leg; rh – relay heat 1st leg; b – B final; † – en route to final mark; so – swim-off; tt – time trial

=== Mixed relay ===
Event	Time	Name	Club	Date	Meet	Location	Ref
4×50 m freestyle relay	2:01.00		Rwanda	17 October 2025	Africa Aquatics Zone III Championships	Nairobi, Kenya	
4×50 m medley relay	2:34.39		Rwanda	17 October 2025	Africa Aquatics Zone III Championships	Nairobi, Kenya	
4×100 m medley relay							

Legend: # – Record awaiting ratification by Fedaration Rwandaise de Natation Amateur; WR – World record; AF – African record; e – equalled existing record;
Records not set in finals: h – heat; sf – semifinal; r – relay 1st leg; rh – relay heat 1st leg; b – B final; † – en route to final mark; so – swim-off; tt – time trial

== Short Course (25 m) ==
=== Men ===
Event	Time		Name	Club	Date	Meet	Location	Ref
50 m freestyle	23.27	h	Oscar Peyre	Clamart Natation 92	30 October 2026	French Championships	Angers, France	
100 m freestyle	54.75	h	Eloi Maniraguha	Rwanda	29 October 2021	World Cup	Kazan, Russia	
200 m freestyle	2:34.69							
400 m freestyle	5:40.57							
800 m freestyle	12:04.74	†	Jackson Niyomugabo	Rwanda	19 December 2010	World Championships	Dubai, United Arab Emirates	
1500 m freestyle	23:27.92		Jackson Niyomugabo	Rwanda	19 December 2010	World Championships	Dubai, United Arab Emirates	
50 m backstroke	24.84	b	Oscar Peyre	Clamart Natation 92	1 November 2026	French Championships	Angers, France	
100 m backstroke								
200 m backstroke								
50 m breaststroke	36.01	h	Eloi Imaniraguha	Rwanda	15 December 2012	World Championships	Istanbul, Turkey	
100 m breaststroke	1:23.24		Uwajeneza Fiston	Rwanda	25 November 2023	Africa Aquatics Zone III Championships	Kigali, Rwanda	
200 m breaststroke								
50 m butterfly	24.32		Oscar Peyre	Rwanda	10 October 2025	International Meeting of Saint-Dizier	Saint-Dizier, France	
100 m butterfly	55.51		Oscar Peyre	Rwanda	12 October 2025	International Meeting of Saint-Dizier	Saint-Dizier, France	
200 m butterfly								
100 m individual medley	58.80	h	Oscar Peyre	Rwanda	11 October 2025	International Meeting of Saint-Dizier	Saint-Dizier, France	
200 m individual medley								
400 m individual medley								
4×50 m freestyle relay								
4×100 m freestyle relay	3:53.14		Ishaka Iradukunda; Cedrick Niyibzi; Eric Iradukunda; Peyre Oscar	Rwanda	25 November 2023	Africa Aquatics Zone III Championships	Kigali, Rwanda	
4×200 m freestyle relay								
4×50 m medley relay								
4×100 m medley relay								

Legend: # – Record awaiting ratification by Fedaration Rwandaise de Natation Amateur; WR – World record; AF – African record; e – equalled existing record;
Records not set in finals: h – heat; sf – semifinal; r – relay 1st leg; rh – relay heat 1st leg; b – B final; † – en route to final mark; so – swim-off; tt – time trial

=== Women ===
Event	Time		Name	Club	Date	Meet	Location	Ref
50 m freestyle	30.28	h	Alphonsine Agahozo	Rwanda	15 December 2012	World Championships	Istanbul, Turkey	
100 m freestyle								
200 m freestyle								
400 m freestyle								
800 m freestyle								
1500 m freestyle								
50 m backstroke								
100 m backstroke								
200 m backstroke								
50 m breaststroke								
100 m breaststroke	1:38.63		Uwase Umuhoza	Rwanda	25 November 2023	Africa Aquatics Zone III Championships	Kigali, Rwanda	
200 m breaststroke								
50 m butterfly	32.42	h, †	Johanna Umurungi	Rwanda	4 December 2014	World Championships	Doha, Qatar	
100 m butterfly	1:09.20	h	Johanna Umurungi	Rwanda	6 December 2014	World Championships	Doha, Qatar	
200 m butterfly								
100 m individual medley								
200 m individual medley								
400 m individual medley								
4×50 m freestyle relay								
4×100 m freestyle relay								
4×200 m freestyle relay								
4×50 m medley relay								
4×100 m medley relay								

Legend: # – Record awaiting ratification by Fedaration Rwandaise de Natation Amateur; WR – World record; AF – African record; e – equalled existing record;
Records not set in finals: h – heat; sf – semifinal; r – relay 1st leg; rh – relay heat 1st leg; b – B final; † – en route to final mark; so – swim-off; tt – time trial
