= Rwanda at the 2015 World Aquatics Championships =

- Flag of Rwanda
- FINA code: RWA
- National federation: Rwanda Swimming Federation

in Kazan, Russia
- Competitors: 4 in 1 sport
- Medals: Gold 0 Silver 0 Bronze 0 Total 0

World Aquatics Championships appearances
- 1973; 1975; 1978; 1982; 1986; 1991; 1994; 1998; 2001; 2003; 2005; 2007; 2009; 2011; 2013; 2015; 2017; 2019; 2022; 2023; 2024

Rwanda competed at the 2015 World Aquatics Championships in Kazan, Russia from 24 July to 9 August 2015.

== Swimming ==
Rwandan swimmers have achieved qualifying standards in the following events (up to a maximum of 2 swimmers in each event at the A-standard entry time, and 1 at the B-standard):

Men

| Athlete | Event | Heat | | Semifinal | | Final | |
| Athlete | Event | Time | Rank | Time | Rank | Time | Rank |
|---|---|---|---|---|---|---|---|
| Eloi Imaniraguha | 200 m freestyle | 2:20.68 | 79 | did not advance | | | |
| Patrick Rukundo | 50 m freestyle | 27.75 | 104 | did not advance | | | |

Women

| Athlete | Event | Heat | | Semifinal | | Final | |
| Athlete | Event | Time | Rank | Time | Rank | Time | Rank |
|---|---|---|---|---|---|---|---|
| Alphonsine Agahozo | 100 m breaststroke | 1:27.80 | 67 | did not advance | | | |
| Johanna Umurungi | 100 m butterfly | 1:13.14 | 65 | did not advance | | | |
