= Rwanda at the 2011 World Aquatics Championships =

- Flag of Rwanda
- FINA code: RWA
- National federation: Rwanda Swimming Federation

in Shanghai, China
- Competitors: 4 in 2 sports
- Medals: Gold 0 Silver 0 Bronze 0 Total 0

World Aquatics Championships appearances
- 1973; 1975; 1978; 1982; 1986; 1991; 1994; 1998; 2001; 2003; 2005; 2007; 2009; 2011; 2013; 2015; 2017; 2019; 2022; 2023; 2024

Rwanda competed at the 2011 World Aquatics Championships in Shanghai, China between July 16 and 31, 2011.

== Open water swimming ==
Men

Athlete	Event	Final	
Athlete	Event	Time	Position
Jackson Niyomugabo	Men's 5km	OTL	
Patrick Rukundo	Men's 5km	OTL	

== Swimming ==
Rwanda qualified 4 swimmers.

Men

Athlete	Event	Heats		Semifinals		Final	
Athlete	Event	Time	Rank	Time	Rank	Time	Rank
Jackson Niyomugabo	Men's 50m Freestyle	27.73	91	did not advance			
Patrick Rukundo	Men's 50m Freestyle	28.08	93	did not advance			

Women

Athlete	Event	Heats		Semifinals		Final	
Athlete	Event	Time	Rank	Time	Rank	Time	Rank
Alphonsine Agahozo	Women's 50m Freestyle	31.41	68	did not advance			
Johanna Umurungi	Women's 50m Butterfly	32.68	45	did not advance			
