= Rwanda at the 2023 World Aquatics Championships =

- Flag of Rwanda
- World Aquatics code: RWA
- National federation: Rwanda Swimming Federation

in Fukuoka, Japan
- Competitors: 2 in 1 sport
- Medals: Gold 0 Silver 0 Bronze 0 Total 0

World Aquatics Championships appearances
- 1973; 1975; 1978; 1982; 1986; 1991; 1994; 1998; 2001; 2003; 2005; 2007; 2009; 2011; 2013; 2015; 2017; 2019; 2022; 2023; 2024; 2025

Rwanda competed at the 2023 World Aquatics Championships in Fukuoka, Japan from 14 to 30 July.

== Swimming ==
Rwanda entered 2 swimmers.

Men

Athlete	Event	Heat		Semifinal		Final	
Athlete	Event	Time	Rank	Time	Rank	Time	Rank
Cedric Niyibizi	50 metre freestyle	25.28 NR	90	Did not advance			
Cedric Niyibizi	100 metre freestyle	56.18 NR	103	Did not advance			

Women

Athlete	Event	Heat		Semifinal		Final	
Athlete	Event	Time	Rank	Time	Rank	Time	Rank
Claudette Ishimwe	50 metre freestyle	35.37	99	Did not advance			
Claudette Ishimwe	50 metre butterfly	41.44	64	Did not advance			
