= Cambodia at the 2019 World Aquatics Championships =

- Flag of Cambodia
- World Aquatics code: CAM
- National federation: Khmer Amateur Swimming Federation

in Gwangju, South Korea
- Competitors: 3 in 1 sport
- Medals: Gold 0 Silver 0 Bronze 0 Total 0

World Aquatics Championships appearances
- 1973; 1975; 1978; 1982; 1986; 1991; 1994; 1998; 2001; 2003; 2005; 2007; 2009; 2011; 2013; 2015; 2017; 2019; 2022; 2023; 2024; 2025

Cambodia competed at the 2019 World Aquatics Championships in Gwangju, South Korea from 12 to 28 July.

== Swimming ==
Cambodia entered three swimmers.

Men

Athlete	Event	Heat		Semifinal		Final	
Athlete	Event	Time	Rank	Time	Rank	Time	Rank
Puch Hem	50 m freestyle	25.13	95	did not advance			
Puch Hem	100 m freestyle	56.77	105	did not advance			
Keouodom Lim	50 m butterfly	27.33	72	did not advance			
Keouodom Lim	100 m butterfly	1:01.17	74	did not advance			

Women

Athlete	Event	Heat		Semifinal		Final	
Athlete	Event	Time	Rank	Time	Rank	Time	Rank
Vitiny Hemthon	50 m freestyle	30.01	83	did not advance			
Vitiny Hemthon	50 m butterfly	32.38	56	did not advance			
