= Iran at the 2023 World Aquatics Championships =

- Flag of Iran
- World Aquatics code: IRI
- National federation: I.R. Iran Amateur Swimming Federation
- Website: irsf.ir

in Fukuoka, Japan
- Competitors: 2 in 1 sport
- Medals: Gold 0 Silver 0 Bronze 0 Total 0

World Aquatics Championships appearances
- 1973; 1975; 1978; 1982; 1986; 1991; 1994; 1998; 2001; 2003; 2005; 2007; 2009; 2011; 2013; 2015; 2017; 2019; 2022; 2023; 2024; 2025

Iran is set to compete at the 2023 World Aquatics Championships in Fukuoka, Japan from 14 to 30 July.

== Swimming ==
Iran entered two swimmers.

Men

Athlete	Event	Heat		Semifinal		Final	
Athlete	Event	Time	Rank	Time	Rank	Time	Rank
Homer Abbasi	50 metre backstroke	26.70	45	Did not advance			
Homer Abbasi	100 metre backstroke	58.45	52	Did not advance			
Samyar Abdoli	50 metre freestyle	23.00	54	Did not advance			
Samyar Abdoli	100 metre freestyle	51.32	61	Did not advance			
