= Papua New Guinea at the 2024 World Aquatics Championships =

- Flag of Papua New Guinea
- FINA code: PNG
- National federation: Papua New Guinea Swimming Federation

in Doha, Qatar
- Competitors: 3 in 1 sport
- Medals: Gold 0 Silver 0 Bronze 0 Total 0

World Aquatics Championships appearances
- 1973; 1975; 1978; 1982; 1986; 1991; 1994; 1998; 2001; 2003; 2005; 2007; 2009; 2011; 2013; 2015; 2017; 2019; 2022; 2023; 2024

Papua New Guinea competed at the 2024 World Aquatics Championships in Doha, Qatar from 2 to 18 February.

== Swimming ==
Papua New Guinea entered 3 swimmers.

Men

Athlete	Event	Heat		Semifinal		Final	
Athlete	Event	Time	Rank	Time	Rank	Time	Rank
Thomas Chen	100 metre breaststroke	1:08.39	64	Did not advance			
Thomas Chen	100 metre butterfly	1:00.66	61	Did not advance			
Josh Tarere	50 metre freestyle	24.64	75	Did not advance			
Josh Tarere	100 metre freestyle	54.72	83	Did not advance			

Women

Athlete	Event	Heat		Semifinal		Final	
Athlete	Event	Time	Rank	Time	Rank	Time	Rank
Georgia-Leigh Vele	50 metre freestyle	28.15	68	Did not advance			
Georgia-Leigh Vele	100 metre freestyle	1:01.88	=57	Did not advance			
