= Cambodia at the 2013 World Aquatics Championships =

- Flag of Cambodia
- World Aquatics code: CAM
- National federation: Khmer Amateur Swimming Federation

in Barcelona, Spain
- Competitors: 3 in 1 sports
- Medals: Gold 0 Silver 0 Bronze 0 Total 0

World Aquatics Championships appearances
- 1973; 1975; 1978; 1982; 1986; 1991; 1994; 1998; 2001; 2003; 2005; 2007; 2009; 2011; 2013; 2015; 2017; 2019; 2022; 2023; 2024; 2025

Cambodia competed at the 2013 World Aquatics Championships in Barcelona, Spain between 19 July and 4 August 2013.

== Swimming ==
Cambodian swimmers achieved qualifying standards in the following events (up to a maximum of 2 swimmers in each event at the A-standard entry time, and 1 at the B-standard):

Men

Athlete	Event	Heat		Semifinal		Final	
Athlete	Event	Time	Rank	Time	Rank	Time	Rank
Hemthon Ponloeu	50 m freestyle	27.34	85	did not advance			
Hemthon Ponloeu	50 m breaststroke	32.41	69	did not advance			
Sovijja Pou	200 m freestyle	2:01.06	61	did not advance			
Sovijja Pou	400 m freestyle	4:22.67	45	—N/a		did not advance	

Women

Athlete	Event	Heat		Semifinal		Final	
Athlete	Event	Time	Rank	Time	Rank	Time	Rank
Hemthon Vitiny	50 m freestyle	31.05	74	did not advance			
Hemthon Vitiny	50 m breaststroke	39.53	70	did not advance			
