= Papua New Guinea at the 2019 World Aquatics Championships =

- Flag of Papua New Guinea
- FINA code: PNG
- National federation: Papua New Guinea Swimming Federation

in Gwangju, South Korea
- Competitors: 4 in 1 sport
- Medals: Gold 0 Silver 0 Bronze 0 Total 0

World Aquatics Championships appearances
- 1973; 1975; 1978; 1982; 1986; 1991; 1994; 1998; 2001; 2003; 2005; 2007; 2009; 2011; 2013; 2015; 2017; 2019; 2022; 2023; 2024

Papua New Guinea competed at the 2019 World Aquatics Championships in Gwangju, South Korea from 12 to 28 July.

== Swimming ==
Papua New Guinea entered four swimmers.

Men

Athlete	Event	Heat		Semifinal		Final	
Athlete	Event	Time	Rank	Time	Rank	Time	Rank
Ryan Maskelyne	100 m breaststroke	1:04.44	62	did not advance			
Ryan Maskelyne	200 m breaststroke	2:18.64	47	did not advance			
Sam Seghers	50 m freestyle	24.16	=76	did not advance			
Sam Seghers	100 m freestyle	52.64	82	did not advance			

Women

Athlete	Event	Heat		Semifinal		Final	
Athlete	Event	Time	Rank	Time	Rank	Time	Rank
Judith Meauri	50 m freestyle	28.30	64	did not advance			
Judith Meauri	200 m freestyle	2:25.42	59	did not advance			
Georgia-Leigh Vele	100 m freestyle	1:02.45	75	did not advance			
Georgia-Leigh Vele	50 m butterfly	30.07	45	did not advance			

Mixed

Athlete	Event	Heat		Final	
Athlete	Event	Time	Rank	Time	Rank
Samuel Seghers; Georgia-Leigh Vele; Judith Meauri; Ryan Maskelyne	4×100 m freestyle relay	3:53.46	30	did not advance	
Samuel Seghers; Ryan Maskelyne; Georgia-Leigh Vele; Judith Meauri	4×100 m medley relay	4:18.99	29	did not advance	
