= Papua New Guinea at the 2023 World Aquatics Championships =

- Flag of Papua New Guinea
- FINA code: PNG
- National federation: Papua New Guinea Swimming Federation

in Fukuoka, Japan
- Competitors: 4 in 1 sport
- Medals: Gold 0 Silver 0 Bronze 0 Total 0

World Aquatics Championships appearances
- 1973; 1975; 1978; 1982; 1986; 1991; 1994; 1998; 2001; 2003; 2005; 2007; 2009; 2011; 2013; 2015; 2017; 2019; 2022; 2023; 2024

Papua New Guinea is set to compete at the 2023 World Aquatics Championships in Fukuoka, Japan from 14 to 30 July.

== Swimming ==
Papua New Guinea entered 4 swimmers.

Men

Athlete	Event	Heat		Semifinal		Final	
Athlete	Event	Time	Rank	Time	Rank	Time	Rank
Nathaniel Noka	50 metre butterfly	27.46	73	Did not advance			
Nathaniel Noka	100 metre butterfly	1:03.69	70	Did not advance			
Josh Tarere	50 metre freestyle	24.77	82	Did not advance			
Josh Tarere	100 metre freestyle	55.27	97	Did not advance			

Women

Athlete	Event	Heat		Semifinal		Final	
Athlete	Event	Time	Rank	Time	Rank	Time	Rank
Abigail Ai Tom	100 metre backstroke	1:14.69	59	Did not advance			
Abigail Ai Tom	50 metre butterfly	31.46	54	Did not advance			
Georgia-Leigh Vele	50 metre freestyle	28.06	66	Did not advance			
Georgia-Leigh Vele	100 metre freestyle	1:01.17	51	Did not advance			

Mixed

Athlete	Event	Heat		Final	
Athlete	Event	Time	Rank	Time	Rank
Nathaniel Noka; Josh Tarere; Abigail Ai Tom; Georgia-Leigh Vele	4 × 100 m freestyle relay	4:03.14	37	Did not advance	
Abigail Ai Tom; Georgia-Leigh Vele; Nathaniel Noka; Josh Tarere	4 × 100 m medley relay	4:32.31	36	Did not advance	
