= Swimming at the 2023 World Aquatics Championships – Men's 50 metre freestyle =

Men's 50 metre freestyle at the 2023 World Aquatics Championships
- Venue: Marine Messe Fukuoka
- Location: Fukuoka, Japan
- Dates: 28 July (heats and semifinals); 29 July (final)
- Competitors: 121 from 110 nations
- Winning time: 21.06 OC

Medalists
gold medal	Cameron McEvoy	Australia
silver medal	Jack Alexy	United States
bronze medal	Benjamin Proud	Great Britain

The men's 50 metre freestyle competition at the 2023 World Aquatics Championships was held on 28 and 29 July 2023.

== Records ==
Prior to the competition, the existing world and championship records were as follows.

World record	César Cielo (BRA)	20.91	São Paulo, Brazil	18 December 2009
Competition record	Caeleb Dressel (USA)	21.04	Gwangju, South Korea	27 July 2019

== Results ==
=== Heats ===
The heats were started on 28 July at 11:12.

Rank	Heat	Lane	Name	Nationality	Time	Notes
1	13	4	Cameron McEvoy	Australia	21.35	Q
2	13	3	Szebasztián Szabó	Hungary	21.67	Q
3	13	5	Florent Manaudou	France	21.72	Q
4	13	6	Jack Alexy	United States	21.73	Q
5	11	0	Isaac Cooper	Australia	21.82	Q
6	11	2	Meiron Cheruti	Israel	21.85	Q
7	10	9	Jordan Crooks	Cayman Islands	21.90	Q, NR
7	12	4	Benjamin Proud	Great Britain	21.90	Q
9	11	4	Ryan Held	United States	21.91	Q
9	13	2	Kristian Gkolomeev	Greece	21.91	Q
11	11	7	Vladyslav Bukhov	Ukraine	21.92	Q
12	12	0	Nicholas Lia	Norway	21.94	Q, NR
13	11	3	Joshua Liendo	Canada	21.97	Q
14	12	3	Leonardo Deplano	Italy	21.99	Q
15	12	2	Kenzo Simons	Netherlands	22.04	Q
16	12	7	Diogo Ribeiro	Portugal	22.05	Q
17	9	3	Mikel Schreuders	Aruba	22.10	S/off
17	13	8	Dylan Carter	Trinidad and Tobago	22.10	S/off
19	13	7	Ian Ho	Hong Kong	22.12	
20	11	5	Thom de Boer	Netherlands	22.13	
20	11	8	Tom Fannon	Ireland	22.13	
22	12	6	Lewis Burras	Great Britain	22.14	
23	11	1	Shinri Shioura	Japan	22.15	
24	10	5	Ji Yu-chan	South Korea	22.17	
25	13	0	Andrii Govorov	Ukraine	22.18	
26	13	1	Jonathan Tan	Singapore	22.20	
27	10	4	Katsumi Nakamura	Japan	22.21	
28	9	1	Lamar Taylor	Bahamas	22.26	NR
28	13	9	Marcelo Chierighini	Brazil	22.26	
30	11	6	Lorenzo Zazzeri	Italy	22.28	
31	10	1	Ali Khalafalla	Egypt	22.30	
31	10	6	Björn Seeliger	Sweden	22.30	
33	10	3	Alberto Mestre	Venezuela	22.32	
34	12	1	Miguel Nascimento	Portugal	22.38	
35	10	7	Michael Pickett	New Zealand	22.41	
36	10	8	Heiko Gigler	Austria	22.46	
37	8	5	Remi Fabiani	Luxembourg	22.47	NR
38	12	9	Wang Changhao	China	22.50	
39	9	7	Sergio de Celis	Spain	22.51	
40	10	2	Andrej Barna	Serbia	22.52	
41	9	4	Matej Dusa	Slovakia	22.53	
42	8	4	Peter Varjasi	Germany	22.54	
43	10	0	Guido Buscaglia	Argentina	22.56	
44	9	0	Kamil Sieradzki	Poland	22.59	
45	9	5	Nikola Miljenić	Croatia	22.61	
46	8	2	Jorge Iga	Mexico	22.64	
47	9	2	Daniel Zaitsev	Estonia	22.68	
48	12	8	Teong Tzen Wei	Singapore	22.76	
49	8	6	Xander Skinner	Namibia	22.78	
50	7	7	David Young	Fiji	22.87	NR
50	8	0	Roland Schoeman	South Africa	22.87	
52	8	7	Adi Mešetović	Bosnia and Herzegovina	22.92	
53	9	6	Emre Sakçı	Turkey	22.94	
54	8	1	Samyar Abdoli	Iran	23.00	
55	7	6	Leo Nolles	Uruguay	23.10	
56	7	5	Stefano Mitchell	Antigua and Barbuda	23.21	
57	1	4	Matthew Abeysinghe	Sri Lanka	23.23	
58	9	9	Oussama Sahnoune	Algeria	23.26	
59	9	8	Nikolas Antoniou	Cyprus	23.27	
60	8	9	Daniil Pancerevas	Lithuania	23.30	
61	8	3	Luong Jérémie Loïc Nino	Vietnam	23.39	
62	7	1	Benedict Parfit	Bermuda	23.47	
63	7	3	Gabriel Martinez	Honduras	23.52	
63	8	8	Wu Chun-feng	Chinese Taipei	23.52	
65	6	7	Colins Obi Ebingha	Nigeria	23.54	NR
66	7	2	Mohammed Bedour	Jordan	23.59	
67	7	4	Alaa Maso	Athlete Refugee Team	23.74	
68	2	4	Alexander Shah	Nepal	23.89	
69	7	0	Tendo Mukalazi	Uganda	23.94	
70	6	1	José Alberto Quintanilla	Bolivia	24.06	
71	3	0	Micah Masei	American Samoa	24.16	
72	5	6	Brandon Schuster	Samoa	24.19	
73	3	8	Damien Shamambo	Zambia	24.22	
74	6	4	Swaleh Abubakar Talib	Suspended Member Federation	24.23	
75	7	9	Musa Zhalayev	Turkmenistan	24.29	
76	6	6	Batbayar Enkhtamir	Mongolia	24.37	
77	7	8	Belly-Cresus Ganira	Burundi	24.39	
78	6	2	Collins Saliboko	Tanzania	24.43	
79	6	9	Warren Lawrence	Dominica	24.51	
80	6	5	Shane Cadogan	Saint Vincent and the Grenadines	24.59	
81	5	4	Syed Tariq	Pakistan	24.76	
82	5	3	Josh Tarere	Papua New Guinea	24.77	
83	6	8	Leon Seaton	Guyana	24.82	
84	5	7	Mahmoud Abu Gharbieh	Palestine	24.88	NR
85	5	5	Yousef Al-Khulaifi	Qatar	24.92	
86	6	0	Asif Reza	Bangladesh	24.94	
87	2	1	Joel Ling Thai Yu	Brunei	24.96	
88	3	7	Mohammed Qatat	Libya	25.15	
89	5	2	Marc Dansou	Benin	25.16	
90	5	8	Cedrick Niyibizi	Rwanda	25.28	NR
91	5	1	Phansovannarun Montross	Cambodia	25.36	
92	2	5	Santisouk Inthavong	Laos	25.56	
92	5	9	Tajhari Williams	Turks and Caicos Islands	25.56	
94	2	2	Kapeli Siua	Tonga	25.83	
95	2	0	Ailton Veira	Cape Verde	26.16	
96	4	4	Travis Dui Sakurai	Palau	26.22	
97	4	2	Alexander Fleming Lake	Anguilla	26.23	
98	5	0	Fakhriddin Madkamov	Tajikistan	26.40	
99	4	6	Houmed Houssein	Djibouti	26.76	NR
100	4	7	Souleymane Napare	Burkina Faso	26.85	
101	4	5	Ekow Gwira	Ghana	27.22	
102	4	1	Edgar Iro	Solomon Islands	27.28	
103	4	3	Elhadj Diallo	Guinea	27.69	
104	3	4	Phillip Kinono	Marshall Islands	27.72	
105	2	6	Johnathan Silas	Vanuatu	27.78	
106	4	0	Simanga Dlamini	Eswatini	27.84	
107	4	8	Joshua Wyse	Sierra Leone	27.89	
108	3	3	Adam Girard	Gabon	28.15	
109	3	5	Muhammad Ali Moosa	Malawi	28.20	
110	3	2	Magnim Jordano Daou	Togo	28.26	
111	4	9	Aseel Khousrof	Yemen	28.39	
112	1	5	Ousman Jobe	Gambia	28.47	
113	2	8	Freddy Mayala	Congo	28.61	
114	2	9	Tilahun Ayal Malede	Ethiopia	28.77	
115	3	6	Jolanio Guterres	Timor-Leste	30.36	
116	2	7	Pedro Rogery	Guinea-Bissau	30.66	
117	3	9	Omar McHangama	Comoros	31.50	
118	1	3	Refiloe Chopho	Lesotho	31.68	NR
119	3	1	Terence Tengue	Central African Republic	32.18	
	2	3	Hugo Nguichie	Cameroon	DSQ	
	11	9	Guilherme Caribé	Brazil	DSQ	
	6	3	Alassane Seydou	Niger	DNS	
	12	5	Maxime Grousset	France	DNS	

==== Swim-off ====
The swim-off to decide the first replacement was started on 28 July at 12:57.

Rank	Lane	Name	Nationality	Time	Notes
1	4	Mikel Schreuders	Aruba	22.10	R1
2	5	Dylan Carter	Trinidad and Tobago	22.14	R2

=== Semifinals ===
The semifinals were held on 28 July at 20:40.

Rank	Heat	Lane	Name	Nationality	Time	Notes
1	2	4	Cameron McEvoy	Australia	21.25	Q
2	1	5	Jack Alexy	United States	21.60	Q
3	1	6	Benjamin Proud	Great Britain	21.61	Q
4	2	3	Isaac Cooper	Australia	21.65	Q
5	2	6	Jordan Crooks	Cayman Islands	21.73	Q, NR
6	1	1	Leonardo Deplano	Italy	21.74	Q
7	1	2	Kristian Gkolomeev	Greece	21.85	Q
8	2	1	Joshua Liendo	Canada	21.88	WD
9	2	2	Ryan Held	United States	21.91	S/off
9	2	7	Vladyslav Bukhov	Ukraine	21.91	S/off
11	2	8	Kenzo Simons	Netherlands	21.92	
12	2	5	Florent Manaudou	France	21.96	
13	1	8	Diogo Ribeiro	Portugal	22.03	
14	1	3	Meiron Cheruti	Israel	22.04	
15	1	7	Nicholas Lia	Norway	22.12	
16	1	4	Szebasztián Szabó	Hungary	22.16	

==== Swim-off ====
The swim-off to decide the first replacement was started on 28 July at 22:09.

Rank	Lane	Name	Nationality	Time	Notes
1	4	Ryan Held	United States	21.68	Q
2	5	Vladyslav Bukhov	Ukraine	21.70	R1

=== Final ===
The final was started on 29 July at 20:09.

Rank	Lane	Name	Nationality	Time	Notes
1st place, gold medalist(s)	4	Cameron McEvoy	Australia	21.06	OC
2nd place, silver medalist(s)	5	Jack Alexy	United States	21.57	
3rd place, bronze medalist(s)	3	Benjamin Proud	Great Britain	21.58	
4	6	Isaac Cooper	Australia	21.70	
5	8	Ryan Held	United States	21.72	
6	2	Jordan Crooks	Cayman Islands	21.73	=NR
7	1	Kristian Gkolomeev	Greece	21.82	
8	7	Leonardo Deplano	Italy	21.92	
