= Cambodia at the 2017 World Aquatics Championships =

- Flag of Cambodia
- World Aquatics code: CAM
- National federation: Khmer Amateur Swimming Federation

in Budapest, Hungary
- Competitors: 3 in 1 sport
- Medals: Gold 0 Silver 0 Bronze 0 Total 0

World Aquatics Championships appearances
- 1973; 1975; 1978; 1982; 1986; 1991; 1994; 1998; 2001; 2003; 2005; 2007; 2009; 2011; 2013; 2015; 2017; 2019; 2022; 2023; 2024; 2025

Cambodia competed at the 2017 World Aquatics Championships in Budapest, Hungary from 14 July to 30 July.

== Swimming ==
Cambodia has received a Universality invitation from FINA to send three swimmers (two men and one woman) to the World Championships.

Athlete	Event	Heat		Semifinal		Final	
Athlete	Event	Time	Rank	Time	Rank	Time	Rank
Cheng Pirort	Men's 50 m freestyle	26.29	=103	did not advance			
Cheng Pirort	Men's 100 m freestyle	58.52	102	did not advance			
Thoi Thoeun	Men's 50 m backstroke	30.72	50	did not advance			
Thoi Thoeun	Men's 50 m butterfly	27.45	60	did not advance			
Hemthon Vitiny	Women's 50 m freestyle	29.69	68	did not advance			
Hemthon Vitiny	Women's 50 m butterfly	32.39	51	did not advance			
