= Cambodia at the 2024 World Aquatics Championships =

- Flag of Cambodia
- FINA code: CAM
- National federation: Khmer Amateur Swimming Federation

in Doha, Qatar
- Competitors: 3 in 1 sport
- Medals: Gold 0 Silver 0 Bronze 0 Total 0

World Aquatics Championships appearances
- 1973; 1975; 1978; 1982; 1986; 1991; 1994; 1998; 2001; 2003; 2005; 2007; 2009; 2011; 2013; 2015; 2017; 2019; 2022; 2023; 2024

Cambodia competed at the 2024 World Aquatics Championships in Doha, Qatar from 2 to 18 February.

== Competitors ==
The following is the list of competitors in the Championships.

Sport	Men	Women	Total
Swimming	2	1	3
Total	2	1	3

== Swimming ==
Cambodia entered 3 swimmers.

Men

Athlete	Event	Heat		Semifinal		Final	
Athlete	Event	Time	Rank	Time	Rank	Time	Rank
Antoine De Lapparent	50 metre freestyle	24.14	64	Did not advance			
Antoine De Lapparent	50 metre backstroke	27.93	40	Did not advance			
Montross Phansovannarun	100 metre freestyle	55.48	90	Did not advance			
Montross Phansovannarun	50 metre butterfly	26.93	50	Did not advance			

Women

Athlete	Event	Heat		Semifinal		Final	
Athlete	Event	Time	Rank	Time	Rank	Time	Rank
Chanchakriya Kheun	50 metre backstroke	31.18	44	Did not advance			
Chanchakriya Kheun	100 metre backstroke	1:09.31	49	Did not advance			
