= Cambodia at the 2023 World Aquatics Championships =

- Flag of Cambodia
- FINA code: CAM
- National federation: Khmer Amateur Swimming Federation

in Fukuoka, Japan
- Competitors: 2 in 1 sport
- Medals: Gold 0 Silver 0 Bronze 0 Total 0

World Aquatics Championships appearances
- 1973; 1975; 1978; 1982; 1986; 1991; 1994; 1998; 2001; 2003; 2005; 2007; 2009; 2011; 2013; 2015; 2017; 2019; 2022; 2023; 2024

Cambodia is set to compete at the 2023 World Aquatics Championships in Fukuoka, Japan from 14 to 30 July.

== Swimming ==
Cambodia entered 2 swimmers.

Men

Athlete	Event	Heat		Semifinal		Final	
Athlete	Event	Time	Rank	Time	Rank	Time	Rank
Phansovannarun Montross	50 metre freestyle	25.36	91	Did not advance			
Phansovannarun Montross	50 metre butterfly	26.95	71	Did not advance			

Women

Athlete	Event	Heat		Semifinal		Final	
Athlete	Event	Time	Rank	Time	Rank	Time	Rank
Chanchakriya Kheun	50 metre backstroke	31.90	49	Did not advance			
Chanchakriya Kheun	100 metre backstroke	1:10.51	57	Did not advance			
