= Iran at the 2024 World Aquatics Championships =

- Flag of Iran
- FINA code: IRI
- National federation: I.R. Iran Amateur Swimming Federation
- Website: irsf.ir

in Doha, Qatar
- Competitors: 2 in 1 sport
- Medals: Gold 0 Silver 0 Bronze 0 Total 0

World Aquatics Championships appearances
- 1973; 1975; 1978; 1982; 1986; 1991; 1994; 1998; 2001; 2003; 2005; 2007; 2009; 2011; 2013; 2015; 2017; 2019; 2022; 2023; 2024

Iran competed at the 2024 World Aquatics Championships in Doha, Qatar from 2 to 18 February.

== Competitors ==
The following is the list of competitors in the Championships.

Sport	Men	Women	Total
Swimming	2	0	2
Total	2	0	2

== Swimming ==
Iran entered 2 swimmers.

Men

Athlete	Event	Heat		Semifinal		Final	
Athlete	Event	Time	Rank	Time	Rank	Time	Rank
Samyar Abdoli	50 metre freestyle	22.98	40	Did not advance			
Samyar Abdoli	100 metre freestyle	51.35	45	Did not advance			
Mehrshad Afghari	50 metre butterfly	24.25	35	Did not advance			
Mehrshad Afghari	100 metre butterfly	53.32	28	Did not advance			
