= Rwanda at the 2019 World Aquatics Championships =

- Flag of Rwanda
- FINA code: RWA
- National federation: Rwanda Swimming Federation

in Gwangju, South Korea
- Competitors: 2 in 1 sport
- Medals: Gold 0 Silver 0 Bronze 0 Total 0

World Aquatics Championships appearances
- 1973; 1975; 1978; 1982; 1986; 1991; 1994; 1998; 2001; 2003; 2005; 2007; 2009; 2011; 2013; 2015; 2017; 2019; 2022; 2023; 2024

Rwanda competed at the 2019 World Aquatics Championships in Gwangju, South Korea from 12 to 28 July 2019.

== Swimming ==
Rwanda entered two swimmers.

Men

Athlete	Event	Heat		Semifinal		Final	
Athlete	Event	Time	Rank	Time	Rank	Time	Rank
Chris Mana	50 m breaststroke	36.93	73	did not advance			
Cedrick Niyibizi	50 m freestyle	28.27	121	did not advance			
Cedrick Niyibizi	50 m butterfly	30.92	89	did not advance			
