= Rwanda at the 2024 World Aquatics Championships =

- Flag of Rwanda
- FINA code: RWA
- National federation: Rwanda Swimming Federation

in Doha, Qatar
- Competitors: 3 in 1 sport
- Medals: Gold 0 Silver 0 Bronze 0 Total 0

World Aquatics Championships appearances
- 1973; 1975; 1978; 1982; 1986; 1991; 1994; 1998; 2001; 2003; 2005; 2007; 2009; 2011; 2013; 2015; 2017; 2019; 2022; 2023; 2024

Rwanda competed at the 2024 World Aquatics Championships in Doha, Qatar from 2 to 18 February.

== Competitors ==
The following is the list of competitors in the Championships.

Sport	Men	Women	Total
Swimming	2	1	3
Total	2	1	3

== Swimming ==
Rwanda entered 3 swimmers.

Men

Athlete	Event	Heat		Semifinal		Final	
Athlete	Event	Time	Rank	Time	Rank	Time	Rank
Cedrick Niyibizi	50 metre freestyle	25.12	80	Did not advance			
Cedrick Niyibizi	100 metre freestyle	56.64	92	Did not advance			
Oscar Peyre	50 metre backstroke	27.79	39	Did not advance			
Oscar Peyre	100 metre backstroke	1:03.56	53	Did not advance			

Women

Athlete	Event	Heat		Semifinal		Final	
Athlete	Event	Time	Rank	Time	Rank	Time	Rank
Nyirabyenda	50 metre freestyle	34.22	103	Did not advance			
Nyirabyenda	50 metre butterfly	36.27	55	Did not advance			
