= Iran at the 2015 World Aquatics Championships =

- Flag of Iran
- FINA code: IRI
- National federation: Iran Amateur Swimming Federation

in Kazan, Russia
- Competitors: 2 in 1 sport
- Medals: Gold 0 Silver 0 Bronze 0 Total 0

World Aquatics Championships appearances
- 1973; 1975; 1978; 1982; 1986; 1991; 1994; 1998; 2001; 2003; 2005; 2007; 2009; 2011; 2013; 2015; 2017; 2019; 2022; 2023; 2024

Iran competed at the 2015 World Aquatics Championships in Kazan, Russia from 24 July to 9 August 2015.

== Swimming ==
Iranian swimmers have achieved qualifying standards in the following events (up to a maximum of 2 swimmers in each event at the A-standard entry time, and 1 at the B-standard):

Men

Athlete	Event	Heat		Semifinal		Final	
Athlete	Event	Time	Rank	Time	Rank	Time	Rank
Jamal Chavoshifar	50 m backstroke	26.53	42	did not advance			
Jamal Chavoshifar	100 m backstroke	58.75	52	did not advance			
Arya Nasimi	100 m breaststroke	1:05.86	59	did not advance			
Arya Nasimi	200 m breaststroke	2:20.22	46	did not advance			
