= Swimming at the 2023 World Aquatics Championships – Men's 100 metre freestyle =

Men's 100 metre freestyle at the 2023 World Aquatics Championships
- Venue: Marine Messe Fukuoka
- Location: Fukuoka, Japan
- Dates: 26 July (heats and semifinals); 27 July (final)
- Competitors: 115 from 108 nations
- Winning time: 47.15

Medalists
gold medal	Kyle Chalmers	Australia
silver medal	Jack Alexy	United States
bronze medal	Maxime Grousset	France

The men's 100 metre freestyle competition at the 2023 World Aquatics Championships was held on 26 and 27 July 2023.

== Records ==
Prior to the competition, the existing world and championship records were as follows.

World record	David Popovici (ROU)	46.86	Rome, Italy	13 August 2022
Competition record	César Cielo (BRA)	46.91	Rome, Italy	30 July 2009

== Results ==
=== Heats ===
The heats were held on 26 July at 10:47.

Rank	Heat	Lane	Name	Nationality	Time	Notes
1	10	3	Matt Richards	Great Britain	47.59	Q, NR
2	12	6	Jack Alexy	United States	47.68	Q
3	10	4	Kyle Chalmers	Australia	47.71	Q
4	10	9	Jordan Crooks	Cayman Islands	47.77	Q, NR
5	11	4	Pan Zhanle	China	47.84	Q
6	12	4	David Popovici	Romania	47.90	Q
7	11	5	Joshua Liendo	Canada	48.03	Q
8	12	5	Maxime Grousset	France	48.06	Q
9	10	5	Alessandro Miressi	Italy	48.14	Q
10	11	8	Dylan Carter	Trinidad and Tobago	48.16	Q, NR
11	11	6	Flynn Southam	Australia	48.18	Q
12	12	1	Hwang Sun-woo	South Korea	48.20	Q
12	12	7	Andrej Barna	Serbia	48.20	Q
14	11	3	Nándor Németh	Hungary	48.21	Q
14	11	7	Diogo Ribeiro	Portugal	48.21	Q
16	11	1	Guilherme Caribé Santos	Brazil	48.34	Q
17	12	8	Szebasztián Szabó	Hungary	48.36	
18	10	7	Chris Guiliano	United States	48.41	
19	10	8	Cameron Gray	New Zealand	48.43	
20	12	9	Manuel Frigo	Italy	48.45	
21	10	6	Katsuhiro Matsumoto	Japan	48.58	
22	11	2	Wang Haoyu	China	48.64	
22	12	0	Mikel Schreuders	Aruba	48.64	
24	11	9	Javier Acevedo	Canada	48.67	
25	10	2	Rafael Miroslaw	Germany	48.68	
26	8	6	Ralph Daleiden	Luxembourg	48.77	NR
26	9	6	Youssef Ramadan	Egypt	48.77	NR
28	10	1	Tomer Frankel	Israel	48.78	
29	9	3	Kamil Sieradzki	Poland	48.80	
30	10	0	Björn Seeliger	Sweden	48.82	
31	12	3	Lewis Burras	Great Britain	48.99	
32	9	7	Danas Rapšys	Lithuania	49.00	
33	8	5	Shane Ryan	Ireland	49.04	
34	9	5	Jonathan Tan	Singapore	49.08	
35	9	2	Luis Domínguez	Spain	49.11	
36	11	0	Heiko Gigler	Austria	49.20	
37	9	4	Jorge Iga	Mexico	49.24	
38	9	9	Vladyslav Bukhov	Ukraine	49.48	
39	7	3	Adilbek Mussin	Kazakhstan	49.64	
40	8	4	Daniel Zaitsev	Estonia	49.68	
41	9	8	Odysseus Meladinis	Greece	49.78	
42	9	1	Alberto Mestre	Venezuela	49.80	
43	8	8	Clayton Jimmie	South Africa	49.95	
44	7	4	Xander Skinner	Namibia	50.00	NR
45	8	2	Guido Buscaglia	Argentina	50.02	
46	8	0	Nicholas Lia	Norway	50.16	
47	7	5	Ian Ho	Hong Kong	50.21	
48	8	3	Nils Liess	Switzerland	50.24	
49	7	7	Wesley Roberts	Cook Islands	50.27	
50	7	6	Matej Duša	Slovakia	50.34	
51	1	4	Matthew Abeysinghe	Sri Lanka	50.46	
52	8	1	Dulyawat Kaewsriyong	Thailand	50.64	
53	6	0	Leo Nolles	Uruguay	50.87	
54	7	8	Adi Mešetović	Bosnia and Herzegovina	51.00	
55	7	2	Simon Doueihy	Lebanon	51.08	
56	6	4	Gabriel Martínez	Honduras	51.10	NR
56	9	0	Oussama Sahnoune	Algeria	51.10	
58	7	0	Waleed Abdulrazzaq	Kuwait	51.15	
59	8	7	Nikolas Antoniou	Cyprus	51.23	
60	6	9	Omar Abbass	Syria	51.24	
61	7	9	Samyar Abdoli	Iran	51.32	
62	8	9	Luong Jérémie Loïc Nino	Vietnam	51.34	
63	7	1	Artur Barseghyan	Armenia	51.36	
64	5	4	Jeancarlo Calderón	Panama	51.42	
65	6	6	Stefano Mitchell	Antigua and Barbuda	51.46	
65	6	7	Yousuf Al-Matrooshi	United Arab Emirates	51.46	
67	6	2	Jayhan Odlum-Smith	Saint Lucia	51.51	
68	6	5	Alaa Masoo	Athlete Refugee Team	51.76	
69	6	1	Colins Ebingha	Nigeria	51.90	
70	5	2	Enkhtamir Batbayar	Mongolia	51.96	NR
70	6	8	Steven Aimable	Senegal	51.96	
72	4	4	Yazan Al-Bawwab	Palestine	52.01	NR
73	6	3	Hansel McCaig	Fiji	52.10	
74	5	6	Musa Zhalayev	Turkmenistan	52.29	
75	5	3	Henrique Mascarenhas	Angola	52.38	
76	5	5	Tomàs Lomero	Andorra	52.53	
77	5	8	Tendo Mukalazi	Uganda	52.56	NR
78	5	7	Benedict Parfit	Bermuda	52.63	
79	5	0	Mohammed Bedour	Jordan	52.69	
80	1	2	Alex Joachim	Saint Vincent and the Grenadines	52.78	
81	2	8	Alexander Shah	Nepal	52.94	
82	4	8	Monyo Maina	Suspended Member Federation	53.03	
83	5	1	Collins Saliboko	Tanzania	53.30	
84	4	1	José Alberto Quintanilla	Bolivia	53.32	
85	4	0	Issa Al-Adawi	Oman	53.67	
86	4	5	Leon Seaton	Guyana	53.75	
86	5	9	Brandon Schuster	Samoa	53.75	
88	4	2	Ado Gargović	Montenegro	53.97	
89	3	3	Syed Muhammad Haseeb Tariq	Pakistan	53.99	
90	4	6	Filipe Gomes	Malawi	54.05	
91	4	3	Dylan Cachia	Malta	54.32	
92	1	7	Yousef Al-Khulafi	Qatar	54.34	
93	4	7	Belly-Cresus Ganira	Burundi	54.51	
94	4	9	Finau Ohuafi	Tonga	54.56	
95	3	5	Justino Pale	Mozambique	54.68	
96	3	9	Israel Poppe	Guam	54.95	
97	3	8	Josh Tarere	Papua New Guinea	55.27	
98	3	0	Zeke Chan Zhi Yue	Brunei	55.37	
99	3	6	Marc Dansou	Benin	55.43	
100	3	4	Md Asif Reza	Bangladesh	55.84	
101	2	1	Abdulhai Ashour	Libya	55.87	
102	3	1	Sangay Tenzin	Bhutan	55.95	
103	3	2	Cedrick Niyibizi	Rwanda	56.18	NR
104	3	7	Jonathan Raharvel	Madagascar	57.64	
105	2	4	Travis Sakurai	Palau	57.86	
106	2	3	Kyler Kihleng	Micronesia	58.21	
107	2	9	Santisouk Inthavong	Laos	58.25	
108	2	6	Edgar Iro	Solomon Islands	59.94	
109	2	5	Ekow Gwira	Ghana	1:01.18	
110	1	3	Johnathan Silas	Vanuatu	1:02.02	
111	1	5	Hugo Nguiche	Cameroon	1:03.00	NR
112	2	2	Phillip Kinono	Marshall Islands	1:03.13	
113	2	0	Pap Jonga	Gambia	1:05.48	
114	2	7	Jolanio Guterres	Timor-Leste	1:12.97	
115	1	6	Pedro Rogery	Guinea-Bissau	1:18.28	NR
	12	2	Marcelo Chierighini	Brazil	Did not start	

=== Semifinals ===
The semifinals were held on 26 July at 20:26.

Rank	Heat	Lane	Name	Nationality	Time	Notes
1	2	4	Matt Richards	Great Britain	47.47	Q, NR
2	2	5	Kyle Chalmers	Australia	47.52	Q
3	2	3	Pan Zhanle	China	47.61	Q
4	1	1	Nándor Németh	Hungary	47.62	Q
5	1	3	David Popovici	Romania	47.66	Q
6	1	5	Jordan Crooks	Cayman Islands	47.71	Q, NR
7	1	6	Maxime Grousset	France	47.87	Q
8	1	4	Jack Alexy	United States	48.06	Q
9	1	7	Hwang Sun-woo	South Korea	48.08	
10	2	8	Diogo Ribeiro	Portugal	48.13	
11	2	7	Flynn Southam	Australia	48.15	
12	1	8	Guilherme Caribé Santos	Brazil	48.18	
13	2	2	Alessandro Miressi	Italy	48.21	
14	2	6	Joshua Liendo	Canada	48.22	
15	2	1	Andrej Barna	Serbia	48.43	
16	1	2	Dylan Carter	Trinidad and Tobago	48.60	

=== Final ===
The final was held on 27 July at 20:21.

Rank	Lane	Name	Nationality	Time	Notes
1st place, gold medalist(s)	5	Kyle Chalmers	Australia	47.15	
2nd place, silver medalist(s)	8	Jack Alexy	United States	47.31	
3rd place, bronze medalist(s)	1	Maxime Grousset	France	47.42	
4	3	Pan Zhanle	China	47.43	AS
5	4	Matt Richards	Great Britain	47.45	NR
6	2	David Popovici	Romania	47.83	
7	7	Jordan Crooks	Cayman Islands	47.94	
8	6	Nándor Németh	Hungary	48.17	
