= Swimming at the 2011 World Aquatics Championships – Women's 50 metre butterfly =

Women's 50 metre butterfly at the 2011 World Aquatics Championships
- Dates: July 29, 2011 (heats and semifinals); July 30, 2011 (final)
- Competitors: 52 from 47 nations
- Winning time: 25.71

Medalists
gold medal	Inge Dekker	Netherlands
silver medal	Therese Alshammar	Sweden
bronze medal	Mélanie Henique	France

The women's 50 metre butterfly competition of the swimming events at the 2011 World Aquatics Championships was held on July 29 with the heats and the semifinals and July 30 with the final.

== Records ==
Prior to the competition, the existing world and championship records were as follows.

	Name	Nation	Time	Location	Date
World record Championship record	Therese Alshammar	Sweden	25.07	Rome	July 31, 2009

== Results ==
=== Heats ===
51 swimmers participated in 7 heats.

Rank	Heat	Lane	Name	Nationality	Time	Notes
1	7	4	Therese Alshammar	Sweden	25.68	Q
2	7	5	Jeanette Ottesen	Denmark	25.88	Q
3	7	7	Dana Vollmer	United States	25.98	Q
4	6	6	Lu Ying	China	26.16	Q
5	5	4	Sarah Sjöström	Sweden	26.17	Q
6	6	2	Christine Magnuson	United States	26.20	Q
7	6	4	Inge Dekker	Netherlands	26.32	Q
8	5	3	Mélanie Henique	France	26.37	Q
9	6	3	Yuka Kato	Japan	26.37	Q
10	5	6	Triin Aljand	Estonia	26.43	Q
11	7	6	Tao Li	Singapore	26.43	Q
12	7	3	Marleen Veldhuis	Netherlands	26.50	Q
13	5	5	Marieke Guehrer	Australia	26.59	Q
14	5	7	Daynara de Paula	Brazil	26.60	Q
15	7	1	Vanessa Mohr	South Africa	26.69	Q
16	6	7	Amit Ivry	Israel	26.83	Q
17	6	8	Elena Gemo	Italy	26.86	
18	4	3	Katerine Savard	Canada	26.87	
19	6	1	Sviatlana Khakhlova	Belarus	26.98	
20	5	2	Ingvild Snildal	Norway	27.01	
21	7	8	Ellen Gandy	Great Britain	27.01	
22	7	2	Jiao Liuyang	China	27.03	
23	5	1	Kristel Vourna	Greece	27.15	
24	6	5	Yolane Kukla	Australia	27.24	
25	5	8	Fabienne Nadarajah	Austria	27.27	
26	4	4	Hannah Wilson	Hong Kong	27.38	
27	4	5	Eszter Dara	Hungary	27.53	
28	4	6	Svetlana Fedulova	Russia	27.61	
29	3	5	Katarina Listopadova	Slovakia	27.62	
30	4	1	Sara Oliveira	Portugal	27.75	
31	4	8	Iris Rosenberger	Turkey	27.82	
32	3	4	Jeserick Pinto	Venezuela	27.91	
33	3	3	Gabriela Ņikitina	Latvia	27.92	
34	4	7	Alana Dillette	Bahamas	27.98	
35	3	2	Talita Baqlah	Jordan	29.16	
36	3	6	Dorian McMenemy	Dominican Republic	29.37	
37	3	1	Dalia Torrez	Nicaragua	29.67	
38	3	7	Kiran Khan	Pakistan	30.50	
39	1	6	Ann-Marie Hepler	Marshall Islands	30.69	
40	2	3	Sylvia Brunlehner	Kenya	30.81	
41	2	4	Hazboun Sabine	Palestine	31.12	
42	3	8	Reshika Udugampola	Sri Lanka	31.15	
43	2	5	Judith Meauri	Papua New Guinea	31.56	
44	2	2	Kuheilani Snow	French Polynesia	32.27	
45	2	6	Johanna Umurungi	Rwanda	32.68	
46	2	7	Ouyngerel Gantumur	Mongolia	33.48	
47	2	8	Deandra van der Colff	Botswana	34.06	
48	2	1	Mariana Henriques	Angola	34.59	
49	1	4	Karin O'Reilly Clashing	Antigua and Barbuda	36.87	
50	1	5	Shajan Aminath	Maldives	38.37	
51	1	3	Adzo Rebecca Kpossi	Togo	55.17	
-	4	2	Hayley Palmer	New Zealand		DNS

=== Semifinals ===
The semifinals were held at 18:19.

==== Semifinal 1 ====
Rank	Lane	Name	Nationality	Time	Notes
1	5	Lu Ying	China	25.87	Q
2	6	Mélanie Henique	France	26.29	Q
3	1	Daynara de Paula	Brazil	26.39	
4	3	Christine Magnuson	United States	26.43	
5	2	Triin Aljand	Estonia	26.48	
6	4	Jeanette Ottesen	Denmark	26.53	
7	7	Marleen Veldhuis	Netherlands	26.61	
8	8	Amit Ivry	Israel	26.79	

==== Semifinal 2 ====
Rank	Lane	Name	Nationality	Time	Notes
1	4	Therese Alshammar	Sweden	25.52	Q
2	6	Inge Dekker	Netherlands	25.78	Q
3	3	Sarah Sjöström	Sweden	25.90	Q
4	2	Yuka Kato	Japan	26.07	Q, =NR
5	1	Marieke Guehrer	Australia	26.12	Q
6	5	Dana Vollmer	United States	26.32	Q
7	7	Tao Li	Singapore	26.34	
8	8	Vanessa Mohr	South Africa	26.74	

=== Final ===
The final was held at 18:02.

Rank	Lane	Name	Nationality	Time	Notes
1st place, gold medalist(s)	5	Inge Dekker	Netherlands	25.71	
2nd place, silver medalist(s)	4	Therese Alshammar	Sweden	25.76	
3rd place, bronze medalist(s)	1	Mélanie Henique	France	25.86	NR
4	3	Lu Ying	China	25.87	
4	6	Sarah Sjöström	Sweden	25.87	
6	2	Yuka Kato	Japan	26.02	NR
7	8	Dana Vollmer	United States	26.06	
8	7	Marieke Guehrer	Australia	26.21	
