= Cambodia at the 2022 World Aquatics Championships =

- Flag of Cambodia
- FINA code: CAM
- National federation: Khmer Amateur Swimming Federation

in Budapest, Hungary
- Competitors: 2 in 1 sport
- Medals: Gold 0 Silver 0 Bronze 0 Total 0

World Aquatics Championships appearances
- 1973; 1975; 1978; 1982; 1986; 1991; 1994; 1998; 2001; 2003; 2005; 2007; 2009; 2011; 2013; 2015; 2017; 2019; 2022; 2023; 2024

Cambodia competed at the 2022 World Aquatics Championships in Budapest, Hungary from 17 June to 3 July.

== Swimming ==
Cambodia entered two swimmers.

Men

Athlete	Event	Heat		Semifinal		Final	
Athlete	Event	Time	Rank	Time	Rank	Time	Rank
Charles Bennici	400 m freestyle	4:26.82	42	—		did not advance	
Charles Bennici	100 m backstroke	1:02.57	44	did not advance			

Women

Athlete	Event	Heat		Semifinal		Final	
Athlete	Event	Time	Rank	Time	Rank	Time	Rank
Vorleak Sok	50 m freestyle	28.62	62	did not advance			
Vorleak Sok	50 m breaststroke	33.84	41	did not advance			
