= Papua New Guinea at the 2017 World Aquatics Championships =

- Flag of Papua New Guinea
- FINA code: PNG
- National federation: Papua New Guinea Swimming Federation

in Budapest, Hungary
- Competitors: 2 in 1 sport
- Medals: Gold 0 Silver 0 Bronze 0 Total 0

World Aquatics Championships appearances
- 1973; 1975; 1978; 1982; 1986; 1991; 1994; 1998; 2001; 2003; 2005; 2007; 2009; 2011; 2013; 2015; 2017; 2019; 2022; 2023; 2024

Papua New Guinea competed at the 2017 World Aquatics Championships in Budapest, Hungary from 14 July to 30 July.

== Swimming ==
Papua New Guinea has received a Universality invitation from FINA to send two male swimmers to the World Championships.

Athlete	Event	Heat		Semifinal		Final	
Athlete	Event	Time	Rank	Time	Rank	Time	Rank
Ashley Seeto	Men's 50 m breaststroke	30.30	59	did not advance			
Ashley Seeto	Men's 100 m breaststroke	1:07.59	65	did not advance			
Sam Seghers	Men's 100 m freestyle	51.29	62	did not advance			
Sam Seghers	Men's 200 m freestyle	1:54.87	59	did not advance			
