= Papua New Guinea at the 2015 World Aquatics Championships =

- Flag of Papua New Guinea
- FINA code: PNG
- National federation: Papua New Guinea Swimming Federation

in Kazan, Russia
- Competitors: 4 in 1 sport
- Medals: Gold 0 Silver 0 Bronze 0 Total 0

World Aquatics Championships appearances
- 1973; 1975; 1978; 1982; 1986; 1991; 1994; 1998; 2001; 2003; 2005; 2007; 2009; 2011; 2013; 2015; 2017; 2019; 2022; 2023; 2024

Papua New Guinea competed at the 2015 World Aquatics Championships in Kazan, Russia from 24 July to 9 August 2015.

== Swimming ==
Papua New Guinean swimmers have achieved qualifying standards in the following events (up to a maximum of 2 swimmers in each event at the A-standard entry time, and 1 at the B-standard):

Men

Athlete	Event	Heat		Semifinal		Final	
Athlete	Event	Time	Rank	Time	Rank	Time	Rank
Ryan Pini	50 m backstroke	26.11	35	did not advance			
Ryan Pini	100 m backstroke	56.39	=41	did not advance			
Ryan Pini	50 m butterfly	24.18	=30	did not advance			
Ryan Pini	100 m butterfly	53.02	30	did not advance			
Sam Seghers	50 m freestyle	23.46	47	did not advance			
Sam Seghers	100 m freestyle	51.35	=64	did not advance			

Women

Athlete	Event	Heat		Semifinal		Final	
Athlete	Event	Time	Rank	Time	Rank	Time	Rank
Tegan McCarthy	50 m butterfly	30.27	55	did not advance			
Tegan McCarthy	100 m butterfly	1:08.82	62	did not advance			
Barbara Vali-Skelton	50 m freestyle	28.78	84	did not advance			
Barbara Vali-Skelton	100 m breaststroke	1:16.85	54	did not advance			

Mixed

Athlete	Event	Heat		Final	
Athlete	Event	Time	Rank	Time	Rank
Ryan Pini; Tegan McCarthy; Barbara Vali-Skelton; Sam Seghers	4 × 100 m freestyle relay	DSQ		did not advance	
Ryan Pini; Tegan McCarthy; Sam Seghers; Barbara Vali-Skelton	4 × 100 m medley relay	4:13.90	19	did not advance	
