= Iran at the 2017 World Aquatics Championships =

- Flag of Iran
- FINA code: IRI
- National federation: Iran Amateur Swimming Federation

in Budapest, Hungary
- Competitors: 1 in 1 sport
- Medals: Gold 0 Silver 0 Bronze 0 Total 0

World Aquatics Championships appearances
- 1973; 1975; 1978; 1982; 1986; 1991; 1994; 1998; 2001; 2003; 2005; 2007; 2009; 2011; 2013; 2015; 2017; 2019; 2022; 2023; 2024

Iran competed at the 2017 World Aquatics Championships in Budapest, Hungary from 14 to 30 July.

== Swimming ==
Iran has received a Universality invitation from FINA to send one male swimmer to the World Championships.

Athlete	Event	Heat		Semifinal		Final	
Athlete	Event	Time	Rank	Time	Rank	Time	Rank
Mehdi Ansari	Men's 50 m butterfly	25.02	46	did not advance			
Mehdi Ansari	Men's 100 m butterfly	55.31	56	did not advance			
