= 2010 FINA World Swimming Championships (25 m) – Men's 1500 metre freestyle =

Men's 1500m Freestyle at the 2010 Short Course Worlds
- Dates: 19 December 2010
- Competitors: 30
- Winning time: 14:24.16

Medalists
gold medal	Oussama Mellouli	Tunisia
silver medal	Mads Glæsner	Denmark
bronze medal	Gergely Gyurta	Hungary

The Men's 1500 Freestyle at the 10th FINA World Swimming Championships (25m) was swum 19 December 2010. 30 individuals swam the event, which was a timed-final where each swimmer swam just once. The top 8 seeded swimmers swam in the evening, and the remain swimmers swam in the morning session.

At the start of the event, the existing World (WR) and Championship records (CR) were:

	Name	Nation	Time	Location	Date
WR	Grant Hackett	Australia	14:10.10	Perth	7 August 2001
CR	Yury Prilukov	Russia	14:22.98	Manchester	13 April 2008

No new world or competition records were set during this competition.

== Results ==
Rank	Heat	Lane	Name	Nationality	Time	Notes
1st place, gold medalist(s)	2	4	Oussama Mellouli	Tunisia	14:24.16	
2nd place, silver medalist(s)	4	5	Mads Glæsner	Denmark	14:29.52	
3rd place, bronze medalist(s)	4	1	Gergely Gyurta	Hungary	14:31.47	
4	4	4	Federico Colbertaldo	Italy	14:33.92	
5	3	2	Peter Vanderkaay	United States	14:35.25	
6	4	3	Sébastien Rouault	France	14:42.79	
7	3	3	Ahmed Mathlouthi	Tunisia	14:43.25	
8	4	8	Lucas Kanieski	Brazil	14:45.51	
9	3	1	Sean Ryan	United States	14:46.38	
10	3	4	Heerden Herman	South Africa	14:50.10	
11	4	2	Samuel Pizzetti	Italy	14:52.81	
12	1	2	Dai Jun	China	14:53.80	
13	4	6	Pál Joensen	Faroe Islands	14:54.94	
14	1	4	Cristian Quintero	Venezuela	14:58.50	
15	2	3	Esteban Enderica	Ecuador	15:04.41	
16	2	1	Alejandro Gómez	Venezuela	15:06.80	
17	4	7	Serhiy Frolov	Ukraine	15:07.74	
18	3	5	Sergey Bolshakov	Russia	15:09.15	
19	3	8	Christian Scherübl	Austria	15:12.63	
20	3	7	Ventsislav Aydarski	Bulgaria	15:16.37	
21	3	6	Esteban Paz	Argentina	15:24.31	
22	2	6	Ivan Enderica Ochoa	Ecuador	15:26.84	
23	1	7	Zhang Zhongchao	China	15:28.31	
24	2	2	Sebastián Jahnsen Madico	Peru	15:30.29	
25	2	7	Andres Olvik	Estonia	15:41.81	
26	2	5	Gabriel Villagoiz	Argentina	15:51.06	
27	1	5	Irakli Revishvili	Georgia	15:55.17	
28	2	8	Mohamed Farhoud	Egypt	16:04.64	
29	1	6	Jackson Niyomugabo	Rwanda	23:27.92	
	1	3	Derrick Bakhuis	Netherlands Antilles	DNF	
