= Guinea-Bissau at the World Aquatics Championships =

Sporting event delegation

Guinea-Bissau has competed in several editions of the World Aquatics Championships.

== 2023 ==
Guinea-Bissau entered 1 swimmer.

Men

Athlete	Event	Heat		Semifinal		Final	
Athlete	Event	Time	Rank	Time	Rank	Time	Rank
Pedro Rogery	50 metre freestyle	30.66	116	Did not advance			
Pedro Rogery	100 metre freestyle	1:18.28 NR	115	Did not advance			

== 2024 ==
Guinea-Bissau entered 1 swimmers.

Men

Athlete	Event	Heat		Semifinal		Final	
Athlete	Event	Time	Rank	Time	Rank	Time	Rank
Pedro Rogery	50 metre freestyle	30.63	115	Did not advance			
Pedro Rogery	100 metre freestyle	Disqualified		Did not advance			

== 2025 ==
Men

Athlete	Event	Heat		Semifinal		Final	
Athlete	Event	Time	Rank	Time	Rank	Time	Rank
Pedro Rogery	50 m freestyle	28.14	108	Did not advance			
Pedro Rogery	100 m freestyle	1:03.93	103	Did not advance			

Women

Athlete	Event	Heat		Semifinal		Final	
Athlete	Event	Time	Rank	Time	Rank	Time	Rank
Nadine Dju	50 m freestyle	53.16	100	Did not advance			
Nadine Dju	50 m breaststroke	DNS		Did not advance			
