= Montross Phansovannarun =

Cambodian swimmer)

Personal information
- Native name: មនត្រស ផានសុវណ្ណអារុន
- Full name: Montross Phansovannarun
- Nationality: American; Cambodian
- Born: 29 March 2003 (age 23)

Sport
- Country: Cambodia
- Sport: Swimming
Medal record
Representing Cambodia
Swimming
Thailand National Championships 2022
Bronze medal – third place	2022	Men 50m Freestyle

Montross Phansovannarun (Khmer: មនត្រស ផានសុវណ្ណអារុន) is a Cambodian swimmer. He mostly competed in 50m, 100m, and 200m swimming competitions and currently holds the national record of 26.70 in the 50m butterfly at the SEA Games.

== Careers ==
He made his debut at the 2019 FINA World Junior Swimming Championships in Men 50m Freestyle when he was 16 years old. He also competed at the 2021 FINA World Swimming Championships (25 m). He won a bronze medal in Men 50m Freestyle at Thailand National Championships (25m course). He participated in the 2021 SEA Games in Vietnam and the 2023 SEA Games in Cambodia, which he is also an athlete's oath.

He represented Cambodia at the 2023 World Aquatics Championships in the 50 metre freestyle event and 50 metre butterfly event.

== Personal life ==
He was born to an American dad, who is a businessman in Cambodia, and a Cambodian mom.

== Honours ==
Swimming
Thailand National Championships
Competitions	Place	Medal	Event
Thailand National Championships (25 m) 2022	Thailand	Bronze	Men 50m Freestyle
