= 2018 African Swimming Championships – Men's 100 metre breaststroke =

Men's 100 metre breaststroke at the 2018 African Swimming Championships
- Venue: Mohamed Boudiaf Olympic Complex
- Dates: 10 September (heats and final)
- Competitors: 23 from 18 nations
- Winning time: 1:01.26

Medalists
gold medal	Wassim Elloumi	Tunisia
silver medal	Youssef El-Kamash	Egypt
silver medal	Alaric Basson	South Africa

The Men's 100 metre breaststroke competition of the 2018 African Swimming Championships was held on 10 September 2018.

== Records ==
Prior to the competition, the existing world and championship records were as follows.

	Name	Nation	Time	Location	Date
World record	Adam Peaty	Great Britain	57.10	Glasgow	4 August 2018
African record	Cameron van der Burgh	South Africa	58.46	London	29 July 2012
Championship record	Malick Fall	Senegal	1:02.71	Johannesburg	1 December 2008

The following new records were set during this competition.

Date	Event	Name	Nationality	Time	Record
10 September	Heats	Youssef El-Kamash	Egypt	1:01.46	CR
10 September	Final	Wassim Elloumi	Tunisia	1:01.26	CR

== Results ==
=== Heats ===
The heats were started on 10 September at 11:30.

Rank	Name	Nationality	Time	Notes
1	Youssef El-Kamash	Egypt	1:01.46	Q CR
2	Wassim Elloumi	Tunisia	1:01.63	Q
3	Alaric Basson	South Africa	1:02.13	Q
4	Beji Adnane	Tunisia	1:04.25	Q
5	Moncef Aymen Balamane	Algeria	1:04.37	Q
6	Siar Abderrazak	Algeria	1:05.95	Q
7	Reece Whitaker	South Africa	1:06.36	Q
8	Jonathan Chung Yee	Mauritius	1:06.58	Q NR
9	Mario Ervedosa	Angola	1:06.82	
10	Samy Boutouil	Morocco	1:08.18	
11	Filipe Gomes	Malawi	1:08.46	
12	Adama Ndir	Senegal	1:09.06	
13	Samuel Ndonga	Kenya	1:10.05	
14	Ahllan Bique	Mozambique	1:10.22	
15	Isihaka Irankunda	Rwanda	1:11.44	
16	Ayaan Chand	Botswana	1:17.06	
17	Jegan Jobe	Gambia	1:20.23	
18	Omar Darboe	Gambia	1:27.26	
19	Landry Koumondji	Benin	1:27.35	
	Fabrice Mopama	Democratic Republic of the Congo	Did not start	
	Onyemeehi Opute	Nigeria	Did not start	
	Sadiq Yahaya	Nigeria	Did not start	
	Yaya Yeressa	Guinea	Did not start	

=== Final ===
The final was started on 10 September.

Rank	Lane	Name	Nationality	Time	Notes
1st place, gold medalist(s)	5	Wassim Elloumi	Tunisia	1:01.26	CR NR
2nd place, silver medalist(s)	4	Youssef El-Kamash	Egypt	1:01.54	
2nd place, silver medalist(s)	3	Alaric Basson	South Africa	1:01.54	
4	6	Beji Adnane	Tunisia	1:03.38	
5	2	Moncef Aymen Balamane	Algeria	1:03.52	
6	7	Siar Abderrazak	Algeria	1:04.38	
7	1	Reece Whitaker	South Africa	1:06.00	
8	8	Jonathan Chung Yee	Mauritius	1:07.37	
