= 2014 FINA World Swimming Championships (25 m) – Women's 50 metre butterfly =

Women's 50 metre butterfly at the 2014 FINA World Swimming Championships (25 m)
- Dates: 4 December (heats and semifinals); 5 December (final)
- Competitors: 81 from 66 nations
- Winning time: 24.58

Medalists
gold medal	Sarah Sjöström	Sweden
silver medal	Jeanette Ottesen	Denmark
bronze medal	Inge Dekker	Netherlands

The Women's 50 metre butterfly competition of the 2014 FINA World Swimming Championships (25 m) was held on 4 December with the heats and the semifinals and 5 December with the final.

== Records ==
Prior to the competition, the existing world and championship records were as follows.

	Name	Nation	Time	Location	Date
World record	Therese Alshammar	Sweden	24.38	Singapore	22 November 2009
Championship record	Therese Alshammar	Sweden	24.87	Dubai	17 December 2010

The following records were established during the competition:

Date	Event	Name	Nation	Time	Record
5 December	Final	Sarah Sjöström	Sweden	24.58	CR

== Results ==
=== Heats ===
The heats were held at 10:40.

Rank	Heat	Lane	Name	Nationality	Time	Notes
1	9	4	Sarah Sjöström	Sweden	25.08	Q
2	7	4	Jeanette Ottesen	Denmark	25.39	Q
3	8	4	Inge Dekker	Netherlands	25.61	Q
4	7	5	Lu Ying	China	25.65	Q
5	7	3	Silvia di Pietro	Italy	25.66	Q
6	7	2	Daynara de Paula	Brazil	25.81	Q
7	8	5	Qiu Yuhan	China	25.83	Q
7	9	3	Aleksandra Urbańczyk	Poland	25.83	Q
7	9	2	Felicia Lee	United States	25.83	Q
10	8	7	Kimberly Buys	Belgium	25.87	Q
11	9	6	Anastasiia Liazeva	Russia	25.97	Q
12	9	8	Marie Wattel	France	25.99	Q
13	8	3	Mélanie Henique	France	26.04	Q
14	9	7	Claire Donahue	United States	26.05	Q
15	7	6	Rozaliya Nasretdinova	Russia	26.07	Q
16	7	1	Daiene Dias	Brazil	26.11	Q
17	8	6	Katerine Savard	Canada	26.16	
18	9	5	Arianna Vanderpool-Wallace	Bahamas	26.22	
19	8	2	Rino Hosoda	Japan	26.26	
20	8	1	Sviatlana Khakhlova	Belarus	26.31	
21	9	1	Ilaria Bianchi	Italy	26.37	
22	8	8	Brianna Throssell	Australia	26.46	
23	7	8	Liliána Szilágyi	Hungary	26.54	
24	8	0	Lucie Svěcená	Czech Republic	26.61	
25	7	0	Nastja Govejšek	Slovenia	26.84	
26	7	7	Elise Olsen	Norway	26.92	
27	6	0	Jenjira Srisa-Ard	Thailand	27.04	
28	8	9	Carolina Colorado Henao	Colombia	27.10	
29	9	9	Danielle Villars	Switzerland	27.37	
30	6	4	Sezin Eligül	Turkey	27.45	
30	6	3	Lehesta Kemp	South Africa	27.45	
32	5	3	Anna Schegoleva	Cyprus	27.52	
33	6	2	Miyu Nakano	Japan	27.67	
34	5	2	Karen Torrez	Bolivia	27.69	
35	6	8	Trudi Maree	South Africa	27.70	
36	5	4	Hannah Dato	Philippines	27.80	
37	6	1	Mary Meza	Costa Rica	27.99	
38	6	5	Esra Kaçmaz	Turkey	28.09	
39	5	5	Hannah Miley	Great Britain	28.13	
40	7	9	Yamilé Bahamonde	Ecuador	28.23	
41	5	6	Felicity Passon	Seychelles	28.49	
42	6	9	Nina Žarković	Bosnia and Herzegovina	28.53	
43	4	4	Maria Ribera	Bolivia	28.89	
44	5	9	Aditi Dhumatkar	India	28.91	
45	5	8	Joyce Tafatatha	Malawi	29.09	
46	6	7	Talita Baqlah	Jordan	29.21	
47	4	5	Ana Nóbrega	Angola	29.31	
48	5	0	San Su Moe Theint	Myanmar	29.45	
49	4	1	Emily Muteti	Kenya	29.52	
50	4	2	Lara Butler	Cayman Islands	29.72	
51	5	1	Zabrina Holder	Barbados	29.81	
52	3	7	Gessica Stagno	Mozambique	29.96	
53	4	0	Samantha Roberts	Antigua and Barbuda	29.97	
54	3	1	Oreoluwa Cherebin	Grenada	30.09	
55	4	3	Ophelia Swayne	Ghana	30.13	
55	5	7	Amboaratiana Domoinanavalona	Madagascar	30.13	
57	4	9	Annie Hepler	Marshall Islands	30.41	
58	4	8	Kimiko Raheem	Sri Lanka	30.43	
59	3	5	Tegan McCarthy	Papua New Guinea	30.71	
59	3	0	Merjen Saryyeva	Turkmenistan	30.71	
61	3	2	Amarah Phillip	British Virgin Islands	30.81	
62	3	3	Evelina Afoa	Samoa	30.98	
63	2	3	Tsogtgerel Mungunsor	Mongolia	31.39	
64	2	9	Irene Prescott	Tonga	31.57	
65	3	4	Choi Weng Tong	Macau	31.82	
66	2	4	Areeba Shaikh	Pakistan	31.86	
67	2	1	Sonia Aktar	Bangladesh	32.10	
68	2	2	Deandra van der Cloff	Botswana	32.14	
69	3	8	Catherine Mason	Tanzania	32.18	
70	2	7	Dirngulbai Misech	Palau	32.42	
71	3	6	Johanna Umurungi	Rwanda	32.54	
72	2	8	Anisha Payet	Seychelles	32.64	
73	2	5	Diana Basho	Albania	32.89	
74	2	6	Angela Kendrick	Marshall Islands	33.04	
76	2	0	Adora Lawrence	Saint Vincent and the Grenadines	33.09	
75	3	9	Nada Arkaji	Qatar	33.64	
77	1	5	Seabe Ebineng	Botswana	33.77	
78	1	4	Veomany Siriphone	Laos	33.98	
79	1	2	Mayra-Linda Paul	Federated States of Micronesia	34.31	
80	1	3	Fatou Diagne	Senegal	36.15	
81	1	7	Elsie Uwamahoro	Burundi	38.97	
—	1	1	Nazlati Mohamed	Comoros		DNS
—	1	6	Kokoe Ahyee	Ivory Coast		DNS
—	4	6	Elinah Phillip	British Virgin Islands		DNS
—	4	7	Anna Manchenkova	Azerbaijan		DNS
—	6	6	Anni Alitalo	Finland		DNS
—	9	0	Katarína Listopadová	Slovakia		DNS

=== Semifinals ===
The semifinals were held at 18:39.

==== Semifinal 1 ====
Rank	Lane	Name	Nationality	Time	Notes
1	4	Jeanette Ottesen	Denmark	24.91	Q
2	5	Lu Ying	China	25.50	Q
3	3	Daynara de Paula	Brazil	25.54	Q, SA
4	6	Aleksandra Urbańczyk	Poland	25.61	Q
5	2	Kimberly Buys	Belgium	25.72	
6	1	Claire Donahue	United States	25.84	
7	8	Katerine Savard	Canada	26.08	
8	7	Marie Wattel	France	26.15	

==== Semifinal 2 ====
Rank	Lane	Name	Nationality	Time	Notes
1	4	Sarah Sjöström	Sweden	25.02	Q
2	5	Inge Dekker	Netherlands	25.31	Q
3	3	Silvia di Pietro	Italy	25.43	Q
4	1	Mélanie Henique	France	25.68	Q
5	6	Qiu Yuhan	China	25.86	
6	8	Daiene Dias	Brazil	25.92	
7	2	Felicia Lee	United States	25.95	
8	7	Anastasiia Liazeva	Russia	26.01	

=== Final ===
The final was held at 18:44.

Rank	Lane	Name	Nationality	Time	Notes
1st place, gold medalist(s)	5	Sarah Sjöström	Sweden	24.58	CR
2nd place, silver medalist(s)	4	Jeanette Ottesen	Denmark	24.71	
3rd place, bronze medalist(s)	3	Inge Dekker	Netherlands	24.73	
4	2	Lu Ying	China	25.21	
5	6	Silvia di Pietro	Italy	25.38	
6	1	Aleksandra Urbańczyk	Poland	25.65	
7	8	Mélanie Henique	France	25.75	
8	7	Daynara de Paula	Brazil	25.94	
