= Libya at the 2019 World Aquatics Championships =

- Flag of Libya
- FINA code: LBA
- National federation: Libyan Swimming Federation

in Gwangju, South Korea
- Competitors: 2 in 1 sport
- Medals: Gold 0 Silver 0 Bronze 0 Total 0

World Aquatics Championships appearances
- 1973; 1975; 1978; 1982; 1986; 1991; 1994; 1998; 2001; 2003; 2005; 2007; 2009; 2011; 2013; 2015; 2017; 2019; 2022; 2023; 2024

Libya competed at the 2019 World Aquatics Championships in Gwangju, South Korea from 12 to 28 July.

== Swimming ==
Libya entered two swimmers.

Men

| Athlete | Event | Heat | | Semifinal | | Final | |
| Athlete | Event | Time | Rank | Time | Rank | Time | Rank |
|---|---|---|---|---|---|---|---|
| Audai Hassouna | 100 m freestyle | 52.34 | 77 | did not advance | | | |
| Audai Hassouna | 200 m freestyle | 1:53.74 | 54 | did not advance | | | |
| Mohammed Jibali | 50 m freestyle | 25.44 | 104 | did not advance | | | |
| Mohammed Jibali | 50 m butterfly | 27.53 | 73 | did not advance | | | |
