= Libya at the 2017 World Aquatics Championships =

- Flag of Libya
- FINA code: LBA
- National federation: Libyan Swimming Association

in Budapest, Hungary
- Competitors: 2 in 1 sport
- Medals: Gold 0 Silver 0 Bronze 0 Total 0

World Aquatics Championships appearances
- 1973; 1975; 1978; 1982; 1986; 1991; 1994; 1998; 2001; 2003; 2005; 2007; 2009; 2011; 2013; 2015; 2017; 2019; 2022; 2023; 2024

Libya competed at the 2017 World Aquatics Championships in Budapest, Hungary from 14 July to 30 July.

== Swimming ==
Libya has received a Universality invitation from FINA to send two male swimmers to the World Championships.

Athlete	Event	Heat		Semifinal		Final	
Athlete	Event	Time	Rank	Time	Rank	Time	Rank
Abdulmalik Ben-Musa	Men's 50 m breaststroke	32.92	72	did not advance			
Abdulmalik Ben-Musa	Men's 100 m breaststroke	1:12.00	71	did not advance			
Adel El-Fakir	Men's 100 m freestyle	53.00	74	did not advance			
Adel El-Fakir	Men's 100 m backstroke	58.48	38	did not advance			
