= Libya at the 2023 World Aquatics Championships =

- Flag of Libya
- FINA code: LBA
- National federation: Libyan Swimming Federation

in Fukuoka, Japan
- Competitors: 2 in 1 sport
- Medals: Gold 0 Silver 0 Bronze 0 Total 0

World Aquatics Championships appearances
- 1973; 1975; 1978; 1982; 1986; 1991; 1994; 1998; 2001; 2003; 2005; 2007; 2009; 2011; 2013; 2015; 2017; 2019; 2022; 2023; 2024

Libya is set to compete at the 2023 World Aquatics Championships in Fukuoka, Japan from 14 to 30 July.

== Swimming ==
Libya entered 2 swimmers.

Men

Athlete	Event	Heat		Semifinal		Final	
Athlete	Event	Time	Rank	Time	Rank	Time	Rank
Abdulhai Ashour	100 metre freestyle	55.87	101	Did not advance			
Abdulhai Ashour	100 metre butterfly	59.98	66	Did not advance			
Mohammed Qatat	50 metre freestyle	25.15	88	Did not advance			
Mohammed Qatat	50 metre butterfly	Disqualified		Did not advance			
