= Libya at the 2011 World Aquatics Championships =

- Flag of Libya
- FINA code: LBA
- National federation: Libyan Swimming Association

in Shanghai, China
- Competitors: 1 in 1 sports
- Medals: Gold 0 Silver 0 Bronze 0 Total 0

World Aquatics Championships appearances
- 1973; 1975; 1978; 1982; 1986; 1991; 1994; 1998; 2001; 2003; 2005; 2007; 2009; 2011; 2013; 2015; 2017; 2019; 2022; 2023; 2024

Libya competed at the 2011 World Aquatics Championships in Shanghai, China between July 16 and 31, 2011.

== Swimming ==
Libya qualified 1 swimmer.

Men

Athlete	Event	Heats		Semifinals		Final	
Athlete	Event	Time	Rank	Time	Rank	Time	Rank
Sofyan El Gadi	Men's 100m Freestyle	56.45	79	did not advance			
Sofyan El Gadi	Men's 100m Butterfly	58.38	57	did not advance			
