= 2014 FINA World Swimming Championships (25 m) – Women's 100 metre butterfly =

Women's 100 metre butterfly at the 2014 FINA World Swimming Championships (25 m)
- Dates: 6 December (heats and semifinals); 7 December (final)
- Competitors: 67 from 52 nations
- Winning time: 54.61

Medalists
gold medal	Sarah Sjöström	Sweden
silver medal	Lu Ying	China
bronze medal	Jeanette Ottesen	Denmark

The Women's 100 metre butterfly competition of the 2014 FINA World Swimming Championships (25 m) was held on 6 December with the heats and the semifinals and 7 December with the final.

== Records ==
Prior to the competition, the existing world and championship records were as follows.

	Name	Nation	Time	Location	Date
World record	Diane Bui Duyet	France	55.05	Istanbul	12 December 2009
Championship record	Felicity Galvez	Australia	55.43	Dubai	19 December 2010

The following records were established during the competition:

Date	Event	Name	Nation	Time	Record
6 December	Semifinals	Sarah Sjöström	Sweden	55.13	CR
7 December	Final	Sarah Sjöström	Sweden	54.61	WR

== Results ==
=== Heats ===
The heats were held at 11:31.

Rank	Heat	Lane	Name	Nationality	Time	Notes
1	5	4	Jeanette Ottesen	Denmark	56.54	Q
2	6	4	Sarah Sjöström	Sweden	56.56	Q
3	7	4	Inge Dekker	Netherlands	56.83	Q
4	5	5	Ilaria Bianchi	Italy	56.87	Q
4	5	2	Daiene Dias	Brazil	56.87	Q
6	7	5	Lu Ying	China	56.88	Q
7	7	6	Liliána Szilágyi	Hungary	56.94	Q
8	7	7	Kimberly Buys	Belgium	57.18	Q
9	6	5	Katerine Savard	Canada	57.22	Q
9	6	3	Felicia Lee	United States	57.22	Q
11	6	6	Chen Xinyi	China	57.26	Q
12	5	8	Elena Di Liddo	Italy	57.34	Q
13	7	2	Anastasiia Liazeva	Russia	57.51	Q
14	6	2	Daynara de Paula	Brazil	57.61	Q
15	7	3	Claire Donahue	United States	57.64	Q
16	6	1	Danielle Villars	Switzerland	57.80	Q
17	5	6	Rino Hosoda	Japan	57.82	
18	5	3	Svetlana Chimrova	Russia	57.87	
19	7	1	Brianna Throssell	Australia	58.29	
20	5	0	Miyu Nakano	Japan	58.47	
21	6	0	Marie Wattel	France	58.48	
22	4	7	Jessica Camposano	Colombia	58.58	NR
22	6	8	Franziska Hentke	Germany	58.58	
24	5	1	Elise Olsen	Norway	58.68	
25	6	7	Audrey Lacroix	Canada	58.69	
26	4	4	Emilia Pikkarainen	Finland	58.80	
27	4	3	Nastja Govejšek	Slovenia	58.84	
28	4	2	Lucie Svěcená	Czech Republic	58.85	
29	4	6	Carolina Colorado Henao	Colombia	59.42	
30	7	8	Birgit Koschischek	Austria	59.62	
31	6	9	Lena Kreundl	Austria	59.70	
32	5	9	Chan Kin Lok	Hong Kong	59.85	
33	7	9	Martina van Berkel	Switzerland	1:00.32	
34	4	5	Nida Üstündağ	Turkey	1:00.50	
35	3	4	Evangelio Dato	Philippines	1:00.53	
36	3	2	Karen Torrez	Bolivia	1:00.66	
37	5	7	Mélanie Henique	France	1:01.36	
38	4	8	Mary Meza	Costa Rica	1:01.85	
39	2	2	Caylee Watson	United States Virgin Islands	1:02.48	
40	4	1	Esra Kaçmaz	Turkey	1:02.97	
41	3	3	Valerie Gruest	Guatemala	1:03.17	
42	2	3	Ana Nóbrega	Angola	1:03.25	
43	3	5	Nina Žarković	Bosnia and Herzegovina	1:03.33	
44	3	1	Felicity Passon	Seychelles	1:03.38	
45	3	8	Machiko Raheem	Sri Lanka	1:03.54	
46	4	9	Lara Butler	Cayman Islands	1:04.52	
47	4	0	Sarah Hadj	Algeria	1:04.55	
48	3	6	Talita Baqlah	Jordan	1:04.70	
49	2	4	Zabrina Holder	Barbados	1:05.24	
50	1	6	Gessica Stagno	Mozambique	1:05.97	
51	2	6	Emily Muteti	Kenya	1:06.01	
52	2	7	Ana Semiruncic	Moldova	1:06.45	
53	3	7	Amboaratiana Domoinanavalona	Madagascar	1:06.61	
54	2	5	Elinah Phillip	British Virgin Islands	1:06.77	
55	3	9	San Su Moe Theint	Myanmar	1:06.96	
56	3	0	Debbie Chew	Guatemala	1:07.21	
57	2	8	San Khant Khant Su	Myanmar	1:08.00	
58	2	0	Amarah Phillip	British Virgin Islands	1:08.83	
59	1	5	Tsogtgerel Mungunsor	Mongolia	1:08.90	
60	2	9	Samantha Roberts	Antigua and Barbuda	1:09.19	
61	1	7	Johanna Umurungi	Rwanda	1:09.20	
62	1	4	Tegan McCarthy	Papua New Guinea	1:09.60	
63	2	1	Beatrice Felici	San Marino	1:11.47	
64	1	3	Diana Basho	Albania	1:11.79	
65	1	2	Annie Hepler	Marshall Islands	1:12.47	
66	1	8	Dirngulbai Misech	Palau	1:14.46	
67	1	1	Areeba Shaikh	Pakistan	1:15.12	
—	7	0	Katarína Listopadová	Slovakia		DNS

=== Semifinals ===
The semifinals were held at 19:02.

==== Semifinal 1 ====
Rank	Lane	Name	Nationality	Time	Notes
1	4	Sarah Sjöström	Sweden	55.13	CR
2	3	Lu Ying	China	56.34	Q
3	5	Ilaria Bianchi	Italy	56.65	Q
4	6	Kimberly Buys	Belgium	56.74	Q
5	2	Felicia Lee	United States	57.02	
6	1	Daynara de Paula	Brazil	57.21	
7	7	Elena Di Liddo	Italy	57.45	
8	8	Danielle Villars	Switzerland	59.24	

==== Semifinal 2 ====
Rank	Lane	Name	Nationality	Time	Notes
1	4	Jeanette Ottesen	Denmark	56.05	Q
2	5	Inge Dekker	Netherlands	56.17	Q
3	7	Chen Xinyi	China	56.74	Q
4	3	Daiene Dias	Brazil	56.93	Q
5	6	Liliána Szilágyi	Hungary	57.12	
6	2	Katerine Savard	Canada	57.25	
7	8	Claire Donahue	United States	57.46	
8	1	Anastasiia Liazeva	Russia	57.95	

=== Final ===
The final was held at 18:52.

Rank	Lane	Name	Nationality	Time	Notes
1st place, gold medalist(s)	4	Sarah Sjöström	Sweden	54.61	WR
2nd place, silver medalist(s)	6	Lu Ying	China	55.25	AS
3rd place, bronze medalist(s)	5	Jeanette Ottesen	Denmark	55.32	
4	3	Inge Dekker	Netherlands	56.40	
5	1	Chen Xinyi	China	56.49	
6	2	Ilaria Bianchi	Italy	56.67	
7	7	Kimberly Buys	Belgium	56.82	
8	7	Daiene Dias	Brazil	57.26	
