= Johanna Umurungi =

Rwandan swimmer

Personal information
- Nationality: Rwandan
- Born: 7 April 1996 (age 30) Turin, Italy

Sport
- Sport: Swimming
- Strokes: Butterfly

Johanna Umurungi (born 7 April 1996 in Turin, Italy) is a Rwandan swimmer who specialises in the 50 metre butterfly and the 100 metre butterfly. Umurungi was the only female swimmer representing Rwanda at the 2016 Summer Olympics in Rio de Janeiro, where she competed in the 100 metre butterfly. She has also competed in three World Championships and a World Short Course Championship.

== Competition ==
Umurungi's debut at an international swimming competition was at the 2011 World Aquatics Championships, where she competed in the 50 metre butterfly. She finished fourth in her heat in a time of 32.68 seconds. Her time was the 45th fastest out of 51 athletes. She was 5.85 seconds slower than the slowest athlete to progress to the semi-final round and she was therefore eliminated from the competition. At the 2013 World Aquatics Championships, Umurungi competed in both the 50 metre and 100 metre butterfly. In the 50 metre event she swam a time of 32.35 seconds in the heat round which was 56th quickest time out of 60 swimmers. She didn't progress to the semi-final round. In the 100 metre butterfly event, her time of one minute and 10.41 seconds was the 50th fastest out of 53 swimmer and she didn't progress to the semi-finals. The 2014 World Short Course Championships was Umurungi's first World Short Course Championships and she competed in both the 50 metre and 100 metre butterfly events. She finished 75th overall in the 50 metre race; with a time of 32.54 seconds; and 61st overall in the 100 metre race; with a time of one minute and 9.20 seconds. At the 2015 World Aquatics Championships Umurungi only competed in the 100 metre butterfly. She swam a time of one minute and 13.14 seconds in her heat and did not progress to the semi-finals.

=== 2016 Summer Olympics ===
Umurungi was the only female swimmer representing Rwanda at the 2016 Summer Olympics. She and male swimmer Eloi Imaniraguha were selected to represent Rwanda after the International Olympic Committee extended an invitation to the country to send two swimmers; otherwise, Rwandan athletes in this category do not normally qualify through the usual qualifications process. Umurungi competed in the 100 metre butterfly. She was drawn in heat one, a heat containing four other athletes alongside Umurungi. Before the race she told The New Times, "I have been training for the whole year with my coach, though it has been difficult because it’s not easy to study and do sport at the same time, I want to do my best". In the race on 6 August 2016, Umurungi swam a time of one minute and 11.92 seconds. Umurungi's time was the second slowest out of 44 finishing athletes, with Umurungi only quicker than Qatari Nada Arkaji, who swam approximately seven seconds slower than Umurungi. Umurungi's time was 13.17 seconds slower than the slowest athlete to progress to the next round and, therefore, she was eliminated.
