= Jackson Niyomugabo =

Rwandan olympic swimmer

Personal information
- Born: 18 April 1988 (age 38) Kibuye, Rwanda

Sport
- Sport: Swimming

Jackson Niyomugabo (born 18 April 1988) is a Rwandan Olympic swimmer. He is originally from Kibuye in Rwanda's western region. He grew up swimming in the waters of Lake Kivu on the border between Rwanda and the Democratic Republic of Congo. His father died early in Jackson's life, and Jackson found strength from his mother, who farms the family's small plot of land in the mountains above Lake Kivu.

Niyomugabo's humble background did not afford him opportunities for extensive professional training. He learned to swim from reading a book provided to him from a high school teacher. He built endurance and stamina by swimming between the mountain top islands in the lake, and was occasionally granted permission to swim in a tourist hotel in the capital, Kigali.

Niyomugabo competed in the 2007 World Aquatics Championship in Australia, although he did not win a medal. He represented the Republic of Rwanda in swimming during the 2008 Summer Olympics and 2012 Summer Olympics.
