= Georgia-Leigh Vele =

Papua New Guinean swimmer

Personal information
- Nationality: Papua New Guinean
- Born: 11 December 1998 (age 27)
- Spouse: Ratu Leone Rotuisolia

Sport
- Sport: Swimming
- Strokes: Butterfly

Georgia-Leigh Vele (born 11 December 1998) is a Papua New Guinean swimmer. She competed in the women's 100 metre freestyle at the 2019 World Aquatics Championships held in Gwangju, South Korea.

She qualified for the 2024 Summer Olympics.
