= Eloi Maniraguha =

Rwandan swimmer (born 1995)

Personal information
- Nationality: Rwandan
- Born: 1 January 1995 (age 30); Kigali, Rwanda

Sport
- Country: Rwanda
- Sport: Swimming

Eloi Maniraguha (born 1 January 1995), previously known as Eloi Imaniraguha, is a Rwandan Olympic swimmer. He represented his country as Eloi Imaniraguha at the 2016 Summer Olympics in the Men's 50 metre freestyle event where he ranked at #68 with a time of 26.43 seconds. He did not advance to the semifinals. He also competed as Eloi Maniraguha at the 2020 Summer Olympics in the men's 50 metre freestyle event and at the 2022 Commonwealth Games in the men's 50 metre freestyle and men's 100 metre freestyle events.
