= Iran at the 2011 World Aquatics Championships =

Sporting event delegation

Flag of Iran

Iran competed at the 2011 World Aquatics Championships in Shanghai, China between July 16 and 31, 2011.

== Swimming ==
Iran qualified 3 swimmers.

Men

Athlete	Event	Heats		Semifinals		Final	
Athlete	Event	Time	Rank	Time	Rank	Time	Rank
Mohammad Bidarian	Men's 50m Freestyle	24.33	51	did not advance			
Mohammad Bidarian	Men's 100m Freestyle	52.42	56	did not advance			
Mohammad Alirezaei	Men's 50m Breaststroke	28.18	22	did not advance			
Mohammad Alirezaei	Men's 100m Breaststroke	DNS		did not advance			
Saeed Ashtiani	Men's 100m Butterfly	56.83	50	did not advance			
Saeed Ashtiani	Men's 200m IM	2:09.81	41	did not advance			
