= Papua New Guinea at the 2011 World Aquatics Championships =

Sporting event delegation

Flag of Papua New Guinea

Papua New Guinea competed at the 2011 World Aquatics Championships in Shanghai, China between July 16 and 31, 2011.

== Swimming ==
Papua New Guinea qualified 3 swimmers.

Men

Athlete	Event	Heats		Semifinals		Final	
Athlete	Event	Time	Rank	Time	Rank	Time	Rank
Ryan Pini	Men's 100m Freestyle	50.34	41	did not advance			
Ryan Pini	Men's 200m Freestyle	1:52.23	38	did not advance			
Ryan Pini	Men's 50m Butterfly	24.26	25	did not advance			
Ryan Pini	Men's 100m Butterfly	52.69	20	did not advance			

Women

Athlete	Event	Heats		Semifinals		Final	
Athlete	Event	Time	Rank	Time	Rank	Time	Rank
Anna-Liza Mopio-Jane	Women's 50m Freestyle	26.91	37	did not advance			
Anna-Liza Mopio-Jane	Women's 100m Freestyle	58.86	46	did not advance			
Judith Meauri	Women's 100m Freestyle	1:01.54	56	did not advance			
Judith Meauri	Women's 50m Butterfly	31.56	43	did not advance			
