= Cambodia at the 2011 World Aquatics Championships =

Sporting event delegation

Flag of Cambodia

Cambodia competed at the 2011 World Aquatics Championships in Shanghai, China between July 16 and 31, 2011.

== Swimming ==
Cambodia qualified 3 swimmers.

Men

Athlete	Event	Heats		Semifinals		Final	
Athlete	Event	Time	Rank	Time	Rank	Time	Rank
Chamraen Youri Maximov	Men's 50m Freestyle	27.48	83	did not advance			
Chamraen Youri Maximov	Men's 400m Freestyle	4:55.35	49			did not advance	
Ponloeu Hem Thon	Men's 50m Freestyle	27.22	81	did not advance			
Ponloeu Hem Thon	Men's 50m Breaststroke	33.48	42	did not advance			

Women

Athlete	Event	Heats		Semifinals		Final	
Athlete	Event	Time	Rank	Time	Rank	Time	Rank
Vitiny Hemthon	Women's 50m Freestyle	31.45	70	did not advance			
Vitiny Hemthon	Women's 50m Backstroke	36.57	54	did not advance			
