= Flag of Rwanda =

Republic of Rwanda
- Use: National flag (Note: The vexillological symbols indicate that the flag shown is a national flag, that it is the normal or de jure version of the flag, and that the reverse (back) side is a mirror of the obverse (front) side.)
- Proportion: 2:3 (Note: Sources published a few years after the flag's adoption, such as Streissguth 2007 and Smith 2002, reported a ratio of 1:2. However, Rwanda's flag law, last updated in 2008, states that the ratio is 2:3.)
- Adopted: 31 December 2001; 24 years ago
- Design: A horizontal tricolour of blue, yellow, and green in a 2:1:1 ratio, with a golden sun in the upper fly-side (Note: I.e. the vertical half further from the flagpole; the right half.) corner
- Designed by: Alphonse Kirimobenecyo

The national flag of Rwanda is a horizontal tricolour consisting of a light blue top half, two equal bands of yellow and green in the bottom half, and a golden sun in the upper fly-side corner. It was adopted on 31 December 2001. Its design is defined in the Rwandan constitution and regulations regarding its use and manufacture are outlined in the country's national flag law.

During the colonial era, the Kingdom of Rwanda flew the German flag and then the Belgian flag. A vertical tricolour of red, yellow, and green was adopted following the coup of Gitarama on 28 January 1961, which saw the abolition of the Tutsi-dominated monarchy and the establishment of a Hutu-dominated republic. A black "R" was later added to the flag's centre that September. In 1994, the Tutsi-led Rwandan Patriotic Front (RPF) overthrew the Hutu-led government and ended the Rwandan genocide. The RPF government that was subsequently formed announced in 1999 its intention to change the national flag, arguing that the existing flag had become associated with the genocide. Critics viewed the move as an attempt to symbolically assert RPF rule.

== Design and symbolism ==
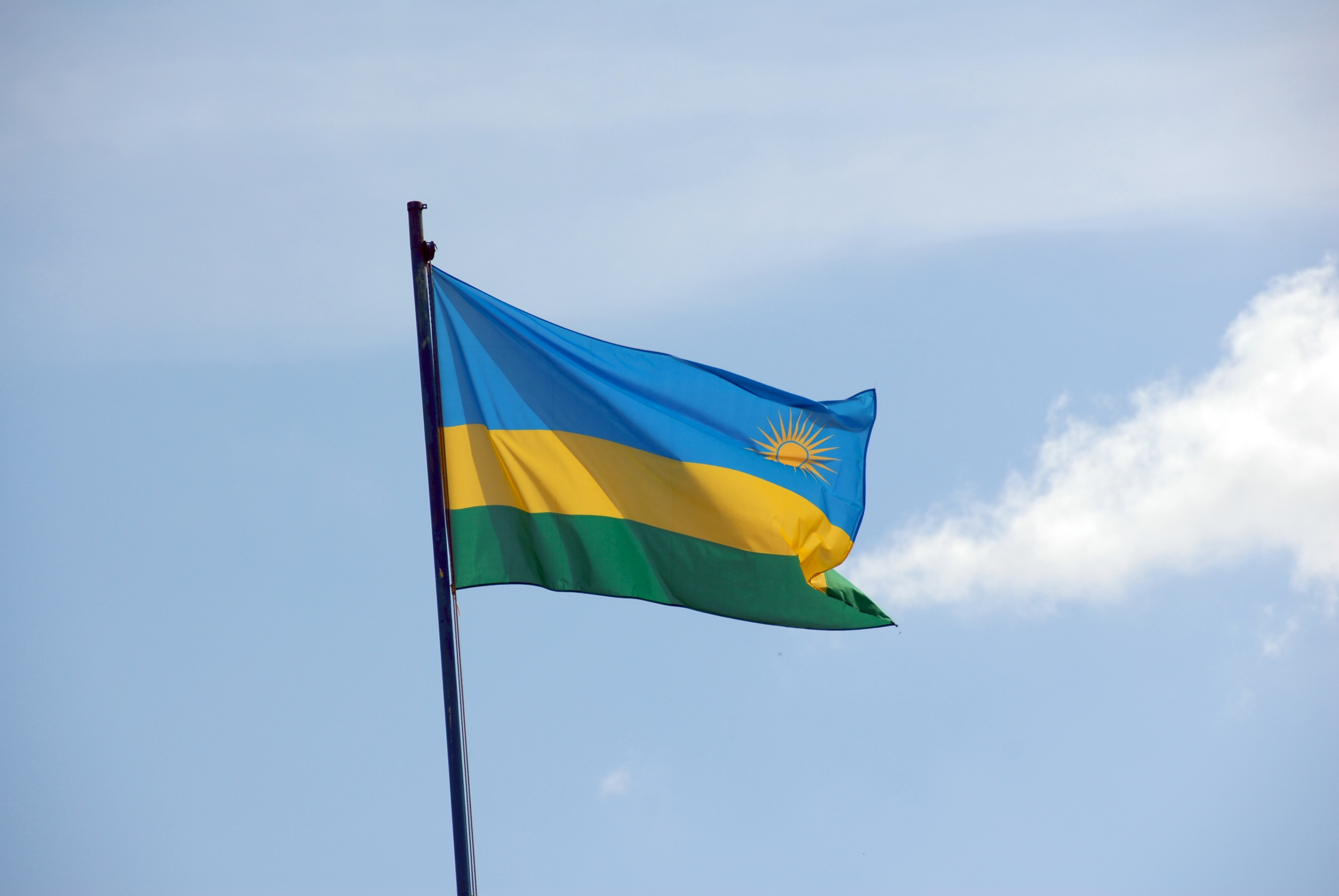
The Rwandan flag flying in Kigali, the country's capital

Rwandan artist and engineer Alphonse Kirimobenecyo designed the flag, which depicts the sun illuminating Rwanda's abundant vegetation. As a symbol, the sun represents national unity and transparency, and the enlightenment of the Rwandan people.

The design is described in Chapter II, Article 9 of the Constitution of Rwanda, 2003 (2015 revision). It states:

The national symbols of Rwanda are the national flag, the motto of the Republic, the seal of the Republic and the national anthem. The flag comprises the following colours: from bottom to top a green stripe, followed by a yellow stripe both of which cover half the flag. The upper half is blue and bears on its right-hand side the image of the sun with its rays of golden yellow. The sun and its rays are separated by a blue ring.

=== Construction ===
The government of Rwanda has specified dimensions, colours, and manufacturing parameters in which the flag is to be made. The flag consists of three horizontal stripes of blue, yellow, and green, from top to bottom. The blue stripe covers half the flag and is twice the height of the yellow and green stripes, which are equal in size. The upper fly-side (top-right) corner features a golden sun with 24 rays that do not touch the sun's circumference. The width-to-length ratio of the flag is 2:3. Rwandan law no. 34/2008 gives specific dimensions for large flags outside or inside government buildings, large flags at national ceremonies, small flags inside government offices or on government vehicles, and flags on medals. Physical flags should be made of 100% polyester and sewn in such a way that the threads connecting the stripes are not visible.

==== Dimensions ====
Construction sheet of the flag of Rwanda

Large flags flown outside government buildings should measure 130 cm × 195 cm (51 in × 77 in) and have no strands; flags flown indoors may have strands. The diameter of the sun should be 13 cm (5.1 in) or 42 cm (17 in) with its rays. The space between the tip of the uppermost ray and the top limit of the flag should be 13 cm (5.1 in), and the space between the tip of the rightmost ray and the fly-side limit of the flag should be 14 cm (5.5 in). The hoist side should have rings to hoist the flag and a yellow ribbon affixed to it that matches the yellow on the flag.

Large flags flown at national ceremonies should be presented in the same way as the flags flown outside government buildings, but their dimensions differ. Such flags should measure 150 cm × 225 cm (59 in × 89 in). The diameter of the sun should be 15 cm (5.9 in) or 48.5 cm (19.1 in) with its rays. The space between the tip of the uppermost ray and the top limit of the flag should be 15 cm (5.9 in), and the space between the tip of the rightmost ray and the fly-side limit of the flag should be 16 cm (6.3 in).

Small flags flown inside government offices or on government vehicles should measure 20 cm × 30 cm (7.9 in × 11.8 in). The diameter of the sun should be 20 mm (0.79 in) or 65 mm (2.6 in) with its rays. The space between the tip of the uppermost ray and the top limit of the flag should be 20 mm (0.79 in), and the space between the tip of the rightmost ray and the fly-side limit of the flag should be 22 mm (0.87 in).

The flag may be placed on a medal, but its dimensions must not exceed 140 mm × 210 mm (5.5 in × 8.3 in).

==== Colours ====
Rwandan law no. 34/2008 specifies the particular shades of the flag's colours and gives them symbolic significance. Rwandan flags should comply with the following colour codes: blue, Pantone 299 C 2x; green, RAL 6029; yellow, RAL 1023; and golden yellow, RAL 1003. Blue represents happiness and peace, yellow represents economic development, and green represents hope for prosperity.

== Protocol ==
=== Display and handling ===
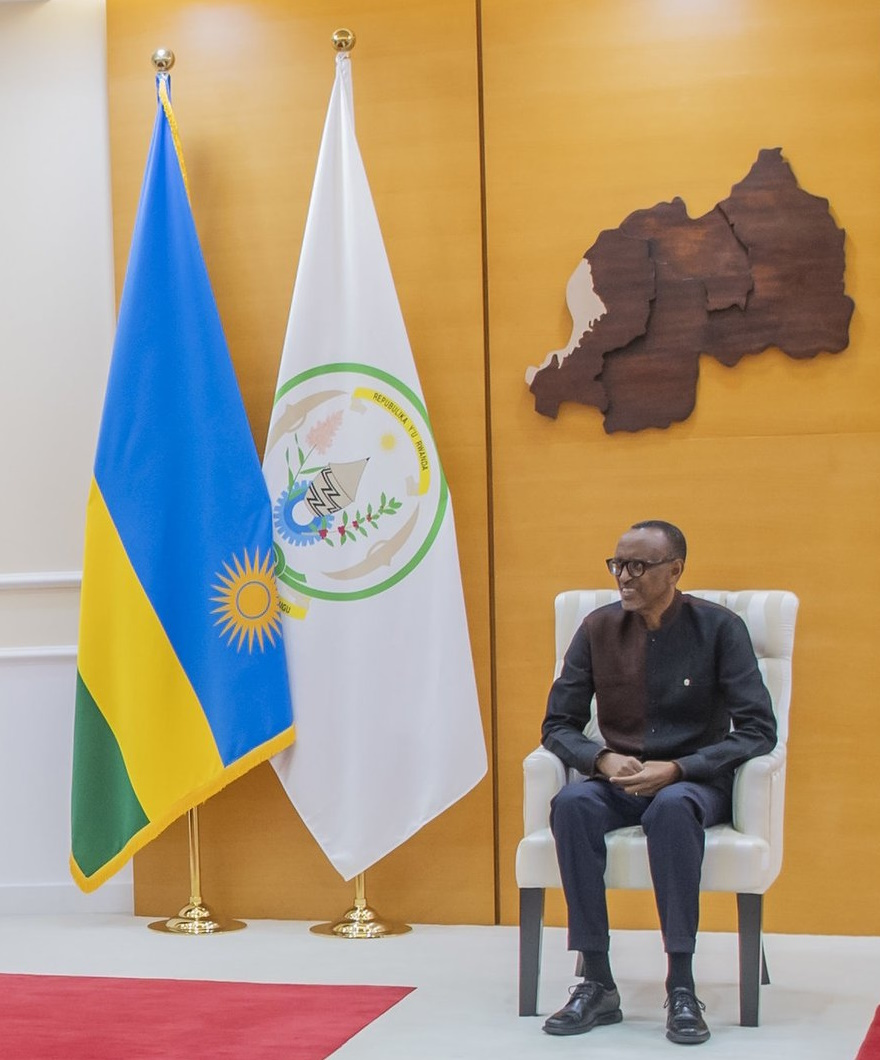
Rwandan President Paul Kagame sitting beside the Rwandan national flag and presidential standard, 19 May 2022

The government of Rwanda has outlined regulations regarding the display and handling of the national flag. Large flags should be flown outside government buildings and during national ceremonies but lowered once the ceremonies have concluded. They may also be flown by "private buildings and legally recognised associations' buildings" with government approval. When raised in front of buildings, the flag raiser should have their back against the front of the building. Flags raised in an official capacity should not be lowered unless they are torn, dirty, or old. Small flags should be displayed inside the offices and on the vehicles of top officials such as the president, other officials determined by a presidential order, and Rwandan representatives abroad.

The national flag is held by officials when they are being sworn into office, and by couples when they are being legally married. The flag should be held by one's left hand while their right hand is raised with a stretched palm. Those who are unable to do so due to disability wear the flag instead. The national flag may also be used to cover the coffin of a deceased person upon the president's order; nothing may be placed on top of the flag and the flag must not touch the ground.

The national flag takes precedent over other flags of the state. During a parade, it should be flown at the front of the procession.

==== Half-mast ====
The national flag must be lowered to half-mast during periods of national mourning and when ordered by the president. The flag may only be lowered to half-mast after it has first been raised to the end of the flagpole. The flag flies at half-mast during the first week of commemoration of the Rwandan genocide, observed annually from 7 to 13 April, as a sign of national mourning and remembrance. Foreign delegations and organisations in the country are encouraged to do the same to their national flags during this period as a sign of solidarity. When a foreign head of a diplomatic mission dies, the Rwandan national flag is lowered to half-mast at the headquarters of the Ministry of Foreign Affairs and Cooperation and Kigali International Airport.

=== Prohibition of use and desecration ===
Disrespecting, denigrating or damaging the national flag carries a sentence of 6 to 12 months in prison, a fine of 50,000 to 100,000 Rwandan francs, or both. A flag that is not the national flag must not be claimed as such; those found guilty of deliberately doing so face a sentence of 1 to 2 years in prison, a fine of 500,000 to 1,000,000 francs, or both. Any other deliberate misuse of the flag, such as the use of incorrect colours, is punishable by 1 to 6 months in prison, a fine of 500,000 to 1,000,000 francs, or both.

== History ==
=== Colonial era ===
The Kingdom of Rwanda became a part of German East Africa after the Berlin Conference of 1884–1885. This change in relationship between the Germans and Rwandans was symbolised by the former's presentation of the Reichsflagge and a letter of protection to Yuhi V of Rwanda. German East Africa was divided among the Allies following their victory over Germany in World War I. Initial postwar negotiations in 1919 awarded the United Kingdom the entirety of the former German colony as a League of Nations mandate, but the Belgians convinced the British to cede to them the kingdoms of Rwanda and Burundi. The Belgian mandate, and later UN trust territory, of Ruanda-Urundi was subsequently established later that year and confirmed by the League of Nations in 1922. The Belgian flag flew in Rwanda from then onwards, until the end of Belgian rule on 1 July 1962.

Flag of the German Empire (Reichsflagge)

Flag of Belgium (civil)

=== 1961–2001 flag ===
The coup of Gitarama on 28 January 1961 and subsequent referendum on the monarchy on 25 September saw the abolition of the Tutsi-dominated kingdom and the establishment of a Hutu-dominated republic. The coup occurred amid the wider Rwandan Revolution, a period of social change and ethnic violence between the Tutsi minority and Hutu majority. Grégoire Kayibanda, the Prime Minister of the Provisional Government, proclaimed a new national flag: a vertical tricolour of red, yellow, and green. The design was identical to that of the flag of Guinea; a black "R" was consequently added to the centre in late September 1961 to distinguish it. The flag was retained upon Rwanda's independence from Belgium on 1 July 1962.

The colours of the flag held the following significance: red represented the blood shed for liberation, yellow represented peace and tranquillity, and green represented hope and optimism. The "R" stood for Rwanda, revolution, and referendum.

Flag of Guinea
(10 November 1958 – present)

Flag of Rwanda
(28 January – September 1961)

Flag of Rwanda
(September 1961 – 31 December 2001)

=== Adoption of the current flag ===
The national flag was not immediately changed after the Tutsi-led Rwandan Patriotic Front (RPF) overthrew the Hutu-led government of Rwanda in 1994, which ended the Rwandan genocide. In 1999, the new RPF government announced that, as part of its reconciliation campaign, it would change the national flag, which had become associated with the Rwandan genocide and Hutu extremism. A nationwide contest was held to determine the new flag's design, and a submission by Rwandan artist and engineer Alphonse Kirimobenecyo was selected. On 25 October 2001, the Rwandan parliament voted to amend the constitution to change the national symbols. The new national flag was subsequently adopted along with a new national anthem on 31 December 2001. Kirimobenecyo intended for his design to be a symbol of unity, patriotism, and hope. However, a number of Rwandans interviewed by American anthropologist Jennie E. Burnet before the flag's adoption expressed doubts about the government's official explanation for the change and viewed the move as an attempt by the RPF to assert its political power.

== See also ==
- List of Rwandan flags
- Emblem of Rwanda
