= Cameroon at the World Athletics Championships =

- Flag of Cameroon
- WA code: CMR
- Medals: Gold 0 Silver 2 Bronze 0 Total 2

World Athletics Championships appearances (overview)
- 1987; 1991; 1993; 1995; 1997; 1999; 2001; 2003; 2005; 2007; 2009; 2011; 2013; 2015; 2017; 2019; 2022; 2023; 2025

Cameroon has participated in most of World Athletics Championships editions, being absent in 1983 and 2022. Françoise Mbango was the first cameroonian athlete to win a world outdoor championship medal, placing second in the women's triple jump event at the 2001 World Championships in Athletics. Two years later, Françoise repeated the same place in the same event.

== Medalists ==
Medal	Name	Year	Event
Silver	Françoise Mbango	2001 Edmonton	Women's triple jump
Silver	Françoise Mbango	2003 Paris	Women's triple jump

=== By event ===
Event	Gold	Silver	Bronze	Total
Triple jump	0	2	0	2
Totals (1 entries)	0	2	0	2

=== By gender ===
Gender	Gold	Silver	Bronze	Total
Women	0	2	0	2
Men	0	0	0	0

== See also ==
- Cameroon at the Olympics
- Cameroon at the Paralympics
