= Cameroon at the 2025 World Aquatics Championships =

- Flag of Cameroon
- World Aquatics code: CMR
- National federation: Fédération Camerounaise de Natation et de Sauvetage

in Singapore
- Competitors: 4 in 1 sport
- Medals: Gold 0 Silver 0 Bronze 0 Total 0

World Aquatics Championships appearances
- 2003; 2005; 2007; 2009; 2011; 2013; 2015; 2017; 2019; 2022; 2023; 2024; 2025

Cameroon is competing at the 2025 World Aquatics Championships in Singapore from 11 July to 3 August 2025.

== Competitors ==
The following is the list of competitors in the Championships.

| Sport | Men | Women | Total |
|---|---|---|---|
| Swimming | 2 | 2 | 4 |
| Total | 2 | 2 | 4 |

== Swimming ==
Men

| Athlete | Event | Heat | | Semifinal | | Final | |
| Athlete | Event | Time | Rank | Time | Rank | Time | Rank |
|---|---|---|---|---|---|---|---|
| Charly Ndjoume | 50 m freestyle | 27.80 | 103 | Did not advance | | | |
| Charly Ndjoume | 50 m butterfly | 30.95 | 97 | Did not advance | | | |
| Claudio Yelegou | 100 m freestyle | 1:02.86 | 102 | Did not advance | | | |
| Claudio Yelegou | 50 m backstroke | 32.42 | 58 | Did not advance | | | |

Women

| Athlete | Event | Heat | | Semifinal | | Final | |
| Athlete | Event | Time | Rank | Time | Rank | Time | Rank |
|---|---|---|---|---|---|---|---|
| Ceylia Djeutcha | 100 m freestyle | 1:12.34 | 81 | Did not advance | | | |
| Ceylia Djeutcha | 50 m breaststroke | 40.92 | 51 | Did not advance | | | |
| Grace Manuela Nguelo'o | 50 m freestyle | 31.09 | 89 | Did not advance | | | |
| Grace Manuela Nguelo'o | 50 m butterfly | 33.51 | 77 | Did not advance | | | |
