= Burkina Faso at the 2025 World Aquatics Championships =

- Flag of Burkina Faso
- World Aquatics code: BUR
- National federation: Fédération Burkinabé de Natation et de Sauvetage

in Singapore
- Competitors: 1 in 1 sport
- Medals: Gold 0 Silver 0 Bronze 0 Total 0

World Aquatics Championships appearances
- 1973; 1975; 1978; 1982; 1986; 1991; 1994; 1998; 2001; 2003; 2005; 2007; 2009; 2011; 2013; 2015; 2017; 2019; 2022; 2023; 2024; 2025

Burkina Faso is competing at the 2025 World Aquatics Championships in Singapore from 11 July to 3 August 2025.

== Competitors ==
The following is the list of competitors in the Championships.

| Sport | Men | Women | Total |
|---|---|---|---|
| Swimming | 0 | 1 | 1 |
| Total | 0 | 1 | 1 |

== Swimming ==
Women

| Athlete | Event | Heat | | Semifinal | | Final | |
| Athlete | Event | Time | Rank | Time | Rank | Time | Rank |
|---|---|---|---|---|---|---|---|
| Iman Kouraogo | 50 m freestyle | 30.52 | 87 | Did not advance | | | |
| Iman Kouraogo | 100 m freestyle | 1:09.56 | 79 | Did not advance | | | |
