= Togo at the 2025 World Aquatics Championships =

- Flag of Togo
- World Aquatics code: TOG
- National federation: Fédération Togolaise de Natation et de Sauvetage

in Singapore
- Competitors: 2 in 1 sport
- Medals: Gold 0 Silver 0 Bronze 0 Total 0

World Aquatics Championships appearances
- 1998; 2001–2007; 2009; 2011; 2013; 2015; 2017; 2019; 2022; 2023; 2024; 2025

Togo competed at the 2025 World Aquatics Championships in Singapore from July 11 to August 3, 2025.

== Competitors ==
The following is the list of competitors in the Championships.

| Sport | Men | Women | Total |
|---|---|---|---|
| Swimming | 1 | 1 | 2 |
| Total | 1 | 1 | 2 |

== Swimming ==
Togo entered 2 swimmers.

Men

| Athlete | Event | Heat | | Semi-final | | Final | |
| Athlete | Event | Time | Rank | Time | Rank | Time | Rank |
|---|---|---|---|---|---|---|---|
| Magnim Jordano Daou | 50 m freestyle | 27.88 | 104 | Did not advance | | | |
| Magnim Jordano Daou | 50 m butterfly | Disqualified | | Did not advance | | | |

Women

| Athlete | Event | Heat | | Semi-final | | Final | |
| Athlete | Event | Time | Rank | Time | Rank | Time | Rank |
|---|---|---|---|---|---|---|---|
| Marie Amenou | 50 m freestyle | 32.49 | 94 | Did not advance | | | |
| Marie Amenou | 50 m butterfly | 39.85 | 79 | Did not advance | | | |
