= Cameroon at the 2025 World Athletics Championships =

- Flag of Cameroon
- WA code: CMR

in Tokyo, Japan 13 September 2025 – 21 September 2025
- Competitors: 4 (1 man and 3 women)
- Medals: Gold 0 Silver 0 Bronze 0 Total 0

World Athletics Championships appearances (overview)
- 1987; 1991; 1993; 1995; 1997; 1999; 2001; 2003; 2005; 2007; 2009; 2011; 2013; 2015; 2017; 2019; 2022; 2023; 2025

Cameroon competed at the 2025 World Athletics Championships in Tokyo, Japan, from 13 to 21 September 2025.

== Results ==
Cameroon entered 4 athletes to the championships: 1 man and 3 women.

Key

- Q = Qualified for the next round
- q = Qualified for the next round as a fastest loser or, in field events, by position without achieving the qualifying target
- NR = National record
- PB = Personal best
- SB = Season best
- N/A = Round not applicable for the event

=== Men ===
Track and road events

Athlete	Event	Preliminary		Heat		Semifinal		Final	
Athlete	Event	Result	Rank	Result	Rank	Result	Rank	Result	Rank
Emmanuel Eseme	100 metres	—N/a		10.24	6	Did not advance			
Emmanuel Eseme	200 metres	—N/a		20.61	7	Did not advance			

=== Women ===
Track and road events

Athlete	Event	Heats		Semifinal		Final	
Athlete	Event	Result	Rank	Result	Rank	Result	Rank
Herverge Etame Kole	100 metres	11.55	6	Did not advance			

Field events

Athlete	Event	Qualification		Final	
Athlete	Event	Distance	Position	Distance	Position
Anne-Suzanna Fosther-Katta	Triple jump	13.45	31	Did not advance	
Nora Monie	Discus throw	55.69	32	Did not advance	
