= List of Burkinabe records in swimming =

The Burkinabé records in swimming are the fastest ever performances of swimmers from Burkina Faso, which are recognised and ratified by the Fédération Burkinabé de Natation et de Sauvetage.

All records were set in finals unless noted otherwise.

== Long Course (50 m) ==
=== Men ===
Event	Time		Name	Club	Date	Meet	Location	Ref
50m freestyle	25.22	h	Adama Ouedraogo	Burkina Faso	30 July 2021	Olympic Games	Tokyo, Japan	
100m freestyle	57.87	h	Adama Ouedraogo	Burkina Faso	21 August 2019	African Games	Casablanca, Morocco	
200m freestyle	2:31.37	†	Souleymane Napare	Burkina Faso	15 October 2021	African Junior Championships	Accra, Ghana	
400m freestyle	5:24.54	†	Souleymane Napare	Burkina Faso	15 October 2021	African Junior Championships	Accra, Ghana	
800m freestyle	11:25.34	†	Souleymane Napare	Burkina Faso	15 October 2021	African Junior Championships	Accra, Ghana	
1500m freestyle	22:01.94		Souleymane Napare	Burkina Faso	15 October 2021	African Junior Championships	Accra, Ghana	
50m backstroke	33.96		Souleymane Napare	Burkina Faso	11 October 2021	African Championships	Accra, Ghana	
100m backstroke								
200m backstroke								
50m breaststroke	30.89	h	Tindwende Sawadogo	Burkina Faso	13 May 2017	Islamic Solidarity Games	Baku, Azerbaijan	
100m breaststroke								
200m breaststroke								
50m butterfly	27.17	h	Adama Ouedraogo	Burkina Faso	22 August 2019	African Games	Casablanca, Morocco	
100m butterfly	1:03.29	h	Adama Ouedraogo	Burkina Faso	29 July 2011	World Championships	Shanghai, China	
200m butterfly								
200m individual medley								
400m individual medley								
4×100 m freestyle relay								
4×200 m freestyle relay								
4×100 m medley relay								

Legend: # – Record awaiting ratification by Fédération Burkinabé de Natation et de Sauvetage; WR – World record; AF – African record;
Records not set in finals: h – heat; sf – semifinal; r – relay 1st leg; rh – relay heat 1st leg; b – B final; † – en route to final mark; tt – time trial

=== Women ===
Event	Time		Name	Club	Date	Meet	Location	Ref
50m freestyle	28.38	h	Angelika Ouedraogo	Burkina Faso	30 July 2021	Olympic Games	Tokyo, Japan	
100m freestyle	1:07.61		Iman Kouraogo	Burkina Faso	11 October 2021	African Junior Championships	Accra, Ghana	
200m freestyle	2:30.40		Iman Kouraogo	Burkina Faso	12 October 2021	African Junior Championships	Accra, Ghana	
400m freestyle	5:25.02		Iman Kouraogo	Burkina Faso	13 October 2021	African Junior Championships	Accra, Ghana	
800m freestyle	11:43.52		Iman Kouraogo	Burkina Faso	6 March 2020	7th Africa CANA Zone II Championships	Ghana	
1500m freestyle								
50m backstroke								
100m backstroke								
200m backstroke								
50m breaststroke	37.27	sf	Angelika Ouedraogo	Burkina Faso	13 May 2017	Islamic Solidarity Games	Baku, Azerbaijan	
100m breaststroke								
200m breaststroke								
50m butterfly	38.44		Iman Kouraogo	Burkina Faso	15 October 2021	African Junior Championships	Accra, Ghana	
100m butterfly								
200m butterfly								
200m individual medley	3:01.77		Iman Kouraogo	Burkina Faso	15 October 2021	African Junior Championships	Accra, Ghana	
400m individual medley								
4×100 m freestyle relay								
4×200 m freestyle relay								
4×100 m medley relay								

Legend: # – Record awaiting ratification by Fédération Burkinabé de Natation et de Sauvetage; WR – World record; AF – African record;
Records not set in finals: h – heat; sf – semifinal; r – relay 1st leg; rh – relay heat 1st leg; b – B final; † – en route to final mark; tt – time trial

== Short Course (25 m) ==
=== Men ===
Event	Time		Name	Club	Date	Meet	Location	Ref
50m freestyle	26.76	h	Tindwende Sawadogo	Burkina Faso	4 December 2014	World Championships	Doha, Qatar	
100m freestyle	59.66	h	Adama Ouedraogo	Burkina Faso	18 December 2010	World Championships	Dubai, United Arab Emirates	
200 m freestyle								
400 m freestyle								
800 m freestyle								
1500 m freestyle								
50 m backstroke								
100 m backstroke								
200 m backstroke								
50m breaststroke	32.01	h	Adama Quedraogo	Burkina Faso	18 December 2010	World Championships	Dubai, United Arab Emirates	
100m breaststroke	1:14.39	h	Adama Quedraogo	Burkina Faso	15 December 2010	World Championships	Dubai, United Arab Emirates	
200 m breaststroke								
50m butterfly	27.34	h	Adama Ouedraogo	Burkina Faso	17 December 2010	World Championships	Dubai, United Arab Emirates	
100m butterfly	1:02.99	h	Adama Ouedraogo	Burkina Faso	15 December 2010	World Championships	Dubai, United Arab Emirates	
200 m butterfly								
100 m individual medley								
200 m individual medley								
400 m individual medley								
4×50 m freestyle relay								
4×100 m freestyle relay								
4×200 m freestyle relay								
4×50 m medley relay								
4×100 m medley relay								

Legend: # – Record awaiting ratification by Fédération Burkinabé de Natation et de Sauvetage; WR – World record; AF – African record;
Records not set in finals: h – heat; sf – semifinal; r – relay 1st leg; rh – relay heat 1st leg; b – B final; † – en route to final mark; tt – time trial

=== Women ===
Event	Time		Name	Club	Date	Meet	Location	Ref
50m freestyle	29.71	h	Iman Kouraogo	Burkina Faso	20 December 2021	World Championships	Abu Dhabi, United Arab Emirates	
100 m freestyle								
200 m freestyle								
400 m freestyle								
800 m freestyle								
1500 m freestyle								
50m backstroke								
100m backstroke								
200m backstroke								
50m breaststroke	37.73	h	Angelika Ouedraogo	Burkina Faso	11 December 2018	World Championships	Hangzhou, China	
100 m breaststroke								
200 m breaststroke								
50 m butterfly								
100 m butterfly								
200 m butterfly								
100 m individual medley								
200 m individual medley								
400 m individual medley								
4×50 m freestyle relay								
4×100 m freestyle relay								
4×200 m freestyle relay								
4×50 m medley relay								
4×100 m medley relay								

Legend: # – Record awaiting ratification by Fédération Burkinabé de Natation et de Sauvetage; WR – World record; AF – African record;
Records not set in finals: h – heat; sf – semifinal; r – relay 1st leg; rh – relay heat 1st leg; b – B final; † – en route to final mark; tt – time trial
