= Swimming at the 2025 World Aquatics Championships – Men's 50 metre butterfly =

Men's 50 metre butterfly at the 2025 World Aquatics Championships
- Venue: World Aquatics Championships Arena
- Location: Singapore Sports Hub, Kallang
- Dates: 27 July (heats and semifinals); 28 July (final)
- Competitors: 98 from 93 nations
- Winning time: 22.48

Medalists
| gold medal | Maxime Grousset | France |
| silver medal | Noè Ponti | Switzerland |
| bronze medal | Thomas Ceccon | Italy |

The men's 50 metre butterfly event at the 2025 World Aquatics Championships was held from 27 to 28 July 2025 at the World Aquatics Championships Arena at the Singapore Sports Hub in Kallang, Singapore.

== Background ==
Switzerland’s Noè Ponti was the top seed with a best of 22.65 from April 2024. Ponti had set multiple short course world records in late 2024 and had recorded most of his fastest long course times in 2025. Canada’s Ilya Kharun was seeded second after lowering his best to 22.68 at the Canadian Trials in June, while France’s Maxime Grousset held the third seed with 22.70 from the French Trials. Other top seeds included Nyls Korstanje of the Netherlands (22.72), Abdelrahman Sameh of Egypt (22.80), and Luca Armbruster of Germany (22.92). Defending world champion Thomas Ceccon of Italy was seeded 10th with 23.00. Former world champion Ben Proud of Great Britain and Dylan Carter of Trinidad and Tobago were also entered.

== Qualification ==
Each National Federation was permitted to enter a maximum of two qualified athletes in each individual event, but they could do so only if both of them had attained the "A" standard qualification time. For this event, the "A" standard qualification time was 23.36. Federations could enter one athlete into the event if they met the "B" standard qualification time. For this event, the "B" standard qualification time was 24.18. Athletes could also enter the event if they had met an "A" or "B" standard in a different event and their Federation had not entered anyone else. Additional considerations applied to Federations who had few swimmers enter through the standard qualification times. Federations in this category could at least enter two men and two women to the competition, all of whom could enter into up to two events.

Top 10 fastest qualification times
| Swimmer | Country | Time | Competition |
|---|---|---|---|
| Noè Ponti | Switzerland | 22.65 | 2024 Swiss Championships |
| Ilya Kharun | Canada | 22.68 | 2025 Canadian Trials |
| Maxime Grousset | France | 22.70 | 2025 French Elite |
| Nyls Korstanje | Netherlands | 22.72 | 2025 AP Race London International |
| Abdelrahman Sameh | Egypt | 22.80 | Monaco stop of the 2025 Mare Nostrum Swim Tour |
| Oleg Kostin | Individual Neutral Athletes | 22.85 | Monaco stop of the 2025 Mare Nostrum Swim Tour |
| Florent Manaudou | France | 22.87 | 2024 French Elite |
| Kyle Chalmers | Australia | 22.89 | 2025 Malmsten Swim Open Stockholm |
| Luca Armbruster | Germany | 22.92 | 2025 German Championships |
| Dylan Carter | Trinidad and Tobago | 22.93 | 2025 Trinidad and Tobago Championships |

== Records ==
Prior to the competition, the existing world and championship records were as follows.

| World record | Andriy Govorov (UKR) | 22.27 | Rome, Italy | 1 July 2018 |
| Competition record | Caeleb Dressel (USA) | 22.35 | Gwangju, South Korea | 22 July 2019 |

== Heats ==
The heats took place on 27 July at 11:11.

| Rank | Heat | Lane | Name | Nationality | Time | Notes |
|---|---|---|---|---|---|---|
| 1 | 9 | 4 | Maxime Grousset | France | 22.74 | Q |
| 1 | 11 | 4 | Noè Ponti | Switzerland | 22.74 | Q |
| 3 | 10 | 4 | Ilya Kharun | Canada | 22.85 | Q |
| 4 | 11 | 7 | Diogo Ribeiro | Portugal | 22.90 | Q |
| 5 | 11 | 5 | Nyls Korstanje | Netherlands | 22.96 | Q |
| 5 | 11 | 8 | Ben Proud | Great Britain | 22.96 | Q |
| 7 | 9 | 6 | Stergios Bilas | Greece | 23.04 | Q, NR |
| 8 | 11 | 6 | Thomas Ceccon | Italy | 23.06 | Q |
| 9 | 9 | 8 | Joshua Liendo | Canada | 23.16 | Q |
| 10 | 9 | 1 | Simon Bucher | Austria | 23.20 | Q |
| 10 | 11 | 2 | Dare Rose | United States | 23.20 | Q |
| 12 | 9 | 7 | Sean Niewold | Netherlands | 23.21 | Q |
| 12 | 10 | 5 | Abdelrahman Sameh | Egypt | 23.21 | Q |
| 12 | 9 | 3 | Guilherme Caribé | Brazil | 23.21 | Q |
| 15 | 10 | 8 | Michael Andrew | United States | 23.22 | Q |
| 16 | 11 | 3 | Luca Armbruster | Germany | 23.28 | Q |
| 17 | 10 | 1 | Szebasztián Szabó | Hungary | 23.29 | |
| 18 | 10 | 9 | Adilbek Mussin | Kazakhstan | 23.33 | NR |
| 19 | 9 | 5 | Oleg Kostin | Neutral Athletes B | 23.34 | |
| 19 | 10 | 0 | Katsuhiro Matsumoto | Japan | 23.34 | |
| 21 | 10 | 3 | Dylan Carter | Trinidad and Tobago | 23.36 | |
| 22 | 11 | 0 | Teong Tzen Wei | Singapore | 23.38 | |
| 23 | 9 | 9 | Jesse Coleman | Australia | 23.40 | |
| 24 | 11 | 1 | Grigori Pekarski | Neutral Athletes A | 23.42 | |
| 25 | 11 | 9 | Kacper Czapla | Poland | 23.44 | |
| 25 | 9 | 2 | Egor Iurchenko | Neutral Athletes B | 23.44 | |
| 25 | 8 | 3 | Daniel Zaitsev | Estonia | 23.44 | |
| 28 | 10 | 7 | Shane Ryan | Ireland | 23.46 | |
| 29 | 10 | 6 | Meiron Cheruti | Israel | 23.51 | |
| 30 | 8 | 1 | Ji Yu-chan | South Korea | 23.57 | |
| 31 | 10 | 2 | Taikan Tanaka | Japan | 23.58 | |
| 32 | 8 | 4 | Eldor Usmonov | Uzbekistan | 23.62 | |
| 33 | 8 | 6 | Casper Puggaard | Denmark | 23.65 | |
| 34 | 8 | 5 | Denis Popescu | Romania | 23.66 | |
| 35 | 8 | 8 | Mikel Schreuders | Aruba | 23.80 | |
| 36 | 9 | 0 | Nikola Miljenić | Croatia | 23.87 | |
| 37 | 8 | 2 | Ulises Cazau | Argentina | 23.88 | |
| 37 | 7 | 4 | Miloš Milenković | Montenegro | 23.88 | |
| 39 | 7 | 5 | Oscar Peyre Mitilla | Rwanda | 24.06 | |
| 40 | 8 | 0 | Alex Santiago | Puerto Rico | 24.11 | |
| 40 | 7 | 3 | David Young | Fiji | 24.11 | |
| 42 | 7 | 7 | Julien Henx | Luxembourg | 24.12 | |
| 43 | 8 | 7 | Tajus Juska | Lithuania | 24.13 | |
| 44 | 7 | 8 | Lin Yuchen | China | 24.19 | |
| 45 | 7 | 0 | Benedicton Rohit | India | 24.26 | |
| 46 | 8 | 9 | Jorge Otaiza | Venezuela | 24.27 | |
| 47 | 7 | 6 | Birnir Freyr Hálfdánarson | Iceland | 24.29 | |
| 48 | 5 | 6 | Jesse Ssengonzi | Uganda | 24.32 | NR |
| 49 | 6 | 5 | Colins Ebingha | Nigeria | 24.45 | |
| 50 | 7 | 9 | Abeiku Jackson | Ghana | 24.49 | |
| 51 | 6 | 4 | Matthieu Seye | Senegal | 24.54 | |
| 52 | 7 | 2 | Emre Sakçı | Turkey | 24.62 | |
| 53 | 6 | 6 | Grisi Koxhaku | Albania | 24.84 | |
| 53 | 5 | 3 | Adam Moncherry | Seychelles | 24.84 | |
| 55 | 6 | 1 | Josh Kirlew | Jamaica | 24.95 | |
| 56 | 6 | 9 | Julio César Rodríguez | Panama | 25.08 | |
| 57 | 5 | 2 | Yousif Bu Arish | Saudi Arabia | 25.15 | |
| 57 | 6 | 8 | Johann Stickland | Samoa | 25.15 | |
| 59 | 6 | 7 | Charles Hockin | Paraguay | 25.17 | |
| 60 | 5 | 4 | Matthew Lawrence | Mozambique | 25.28 | |
| 61 | 6 | 2 | Nika Tchitchiashvili | Georgia | 25.29 | |
| 62 | 2 | 1 | Jeno Heyns | Suriname | 25.46 | |
| 63 | 4 | 3 | Damien Shamambo | Zambia | 25.50 | |
| 64 | 5 | 7 | Christien Kelly | Barbados | 25.51 | |
| 65 | 5 | 1 | Finau Ohuafi | Tonga | 25.53 | |
| 66 | 5 | 0 | Lam Chi Chong | Macau | 25.59 | |
| 67 | 5 | 5 | Joash McKonie | Zimbabwe | 25.63 | |
| 68 | 6 | 3 | Jefferson Kpanou | Benin | 25.64 | |
| 69 | 4 | 5 | David Akopyan | Turkmenistan | 25.66 | |
| 70 | 4 | 4 | Matin Balsini | Athlete Refugee Team | 25.69 | |
| 70 | 6 | 0 | Dulyawat Kaewsriyong | Thailand | 25.69 | |
| 72 | 1 | 3 | Aaron Ghebre Owusu | Eritrea | 25.76 | |
| 73 | 5 | 8 | Stephen Nyoike | Kenya | 26.01 | |
| 74 | 4 | 6 | Belly-Cresus Ganira | Burundi | 26.03 | |
| 75 | 4 | 8 | Nathaniel Noka | Papua New Guinea | 26.06 | |
| 76 | 2 | 6 | Salem Sabt | United Arab Emirates | 26.25 | |
| 77 | 1 | 4 | Ajal Kaji Tamrakar | Nepal | 26.49 | |
| 78 | 2 | 3 | Naeem DeSouza | Antigua and Barbuda | 26.52 | |
| 79 | 3 | 1 | Kazuumi Nestor | Palau | 26.56 | NR |
| 79 | 5 | 9 | Francky Ramiakatrarivo | Madagascar | 26.56 | |
| 81 | 4 | 7 | Katerson Moya | Federated States of Micronesia | 26.67 | NR |
| 82 | 4 | 1 | Tsui Yik Ki | Hong Kong | 26.71 | |
| 83 | 2 | 7 | Mohammed Al-Wahaibi | Oman | 26.76 | |
| 84 | 4 | 2 | Houmed Houssein Barkat | Djibouti | 27.25 | |
| 85 | 4 | 0 | Nigel Fontenelle | Sint Maarten | 27.58 | |
| 86 | 2 | 8 | Michael Miller | Northern Mariana Islands | 27.64 | |
| 87 | 3 | 3 | Fodé Camara | Guinea | 28.17 | NR |
| 88 | 2 | 2 | Michael Joseph | Tanzania | 28.37 | |
| 89 | 4 | 9 | Kinley Lhendup | Bhutan | 28.53 | |
| 90 | 2 | 5 | Ryuto Saysanavongphet | Laos | 28.67 | |
| 91 | 3 | 5 | Asher Banda | Malawi | 28.71 | |
| 92 | 3 | 9 | Leo Lebot | Vanuatu | 29.28 | NR |
| 93 | 3 | 0 | Yusuf Nasser | Yemen | 29.89 | |
| 94 | 3 | 2 | Hadji Hassane | Comoros | 30.22 | |
| 95 | 2 | 0 | Ben Lassina Traoré | Ivory Coast | 30.34 | |
| 96 | 1 | 5 | Jacob Mugisha | Democratic Republic of the Congo | 30.38 | |
| 97 | 3 | 6 | Charly Ndjoume | Cameroon | 30.95 | |
| — | 3 | 4 | Ousman Jobe | The Gambia | Did not start | |
| — | 7 | 1 | Bryan Leong | Malaysia | Did not start | |
| — | 2 | 4 | Higinio Ndong Obama | Equatorial Guinea | Did not start | |
| — | 3 | 7 | Moses Yongai | Sierra Leone | Did not start | |
| — | 3 | 8 | Magnim Jordano Daou | Togo | Disqualified | |

== Semifinals ==
The semifinals took place on 27 July at 19:23.

| Rank | Heat | Lane | Name | Nationality | Time | Notes |
|---|---|---|---|---|---|---|
| 1 | 2 | 4 | Maxime Grousset | France | 22.61 | Q, NR |
| 2 | 1 | 4 | Noè Ponti | Switzerland | 22.72 | Q |
| 3 | 1 | 3 | Ben Proud | Great Britain | 22.74 | Q, NR |
| 4 | 2 | 3 | Nyls Korstanje | Netherlands | 22.79 | Q |
| 5 | 1 | 5 | Diogo Ribeiro | Portugal | 22.83 | Q |
| 6 | 1 | 6 | Thomas Ceccon | Italy | 22.84 | Q |
| 7 | 1 | 7 | Guilherme Caribé | Brazil | 22.91 | Q |
| 7 | 1 | 8 | Luca Armbruster | Germany | 22.91 | Q, NR |
| 9 | 2 | 5 | Ilya Kharun | Canada | 22.92 | |
| 10 | 1 | 2 | Simon Bucher | Austria | 22.95 | NR |
| 11 | 2 | 6 | Stergios Bilas | Greece | 23.00 | NR |
| 12 | 2 | 7 | Dare Rose | United States | 23.02 | |
| 13 | 2 | 2 | Joshua Liendo | Canada | 23.11 | |
| 14 | 1 | 1 | Abdelrahman Sameh | Egypt | 23.12 | |
| 15 | 2 | 1 | Sean Niewold | Netherlands | 23.17 | |
| 16 | 2 | 8 | Michael Andrew | United States | 23.23 | |

== Final ==
The final took place on 28 July at 19:45.

| Rank | Lane | Name | Nationality | Time | Notes |
|---|---|---|---|---|---|
| 1st place, gold medalist(s) | 4 | Maxime Grousset | France | 22.48 | NR |
| 2nd place, silver medalist(s) | 5 | Noè Ponti | Switzerland | 22.51 | NR |
| 3rd place, bronze medalist(s) | 7 | Thomas Ceccon | Italy | 22.67 | NR |
| 4 | 2 | Diogo Ribeiro | Portugal | 22.77 | NR |
| 5 | 3 | Ben Proud | Great Britain | 22.79 | |
| 6 | 6 | Nyls Korstanje | Netherlands | 22.84 | |
| 6 | 8 | Luca Armbruster | Germany | 22.84 | NR |
| 8 | 1 | Guilherme Caribé | Brazil | 22.92 | |
