= Burkina Faso at the 2017 World Aquatics Championships =

- Flag of Burkina Faso
- FINA code: BUR
- National federation: Burkinabé Swimming and Life Saving Federation

in Budapest, Hungary
- Competitors: 3 in 1 sport
- Medals: Gold 0 Silver 0 Bronze 0 Total 0

World Aquatics Championships appearances
- 1973; 1975; 1978; 1982; 1986; 1991; 1994; 1998; 2001; 2003; 2005; 2007; 2009; 2011; 2013; 2015; 2017; 2019; 2022; 2023; 2024

Burkina Faso competed at the 2017 World Aquatics Championships in Budapest, Hungary from 14 July to 30 July.

== Swimming ==
Burkina Faso has received a Universality invitation from FINA to send three swimmers (two men and one woman) to the World Championships.

Athlete	Event	Heat		Semifinal		Final	
Athlete	Event	Time	Rank	Time	Rank	Time	Rank
Tindwende Sawadogo	Men's 50 m breaststroke	32.38	67	did not advance			
Roland Zouetaba	Men's 50 m freestyle	29.53	117	did not advance			
Angelika Ouedraogo	Women's 50 m freestyle	29.38	67	did not advance			
Angelika Ouedraogo	Women's 50 m breaststroke	37.89	44	did not advance			
