= Burkina Faso at the 2011 World Aquatics Championships =

- Flag of Burkina Faso
- FINA code: BUR
- National federation: Burkinabé Swimming and Life Saving Federation

in Shanghai, China
- Competitors: 3 in 1 sports
- Medals: Gold 0 Silver 0 Bronze 0 Total 0

World Aquatics Championships appearances
- 1973; 1975; 1978; 1982; 1986; 1991; 1994; 1998; 2001; 2003; 2005; 2007; 2009; 2011; 2013; 2015; 2017; 2019; 2022; 2023; 2024

Burkina Faso competed at the 2011 World Aquatics Championships in Shanghai, China between July 16 and 31, 2011.

== Swimming ==
Burkina Faso qualified 3 swimmers.

Men

Athlete	Event	Heats		Semifinals		Final	
Athlete	Event	Time	Rank	Time	Rank	Time	Rank
Adama Ouedraogo	50 m freestyle	25.33	66	did not advance			
Adama Ouedraogo	100 m butterfly	1:03.29	62	did not advance			

Women

Athlete	Event	Heats		Semifinals		Final	
Athlete	Event	Time	Rank	Time	Rank	Time	Rank
Angelika Sita Ouedraogo	50 m freestyle	33.54	75	did not advance			
Angelika Sita Ouedraogo	50 m breaststroke	40.93	30	did not advance			
Ingrid Outtara	50 m freestyle	44.43	85	did not advance			
Ingrid Outtara	50 m breaststroke	DSQ		did not advance			
