= Swimming at the 2023 World Aquatics Championships – Men's 50 metre butterfly =

Men's 50 metre butterfly at the 2023 World Aquatics Championships
- Venue: Marine Messe Fukuoka
- Location: Fukuoka, Japan
- Dates: 23 July (heats and semifinals); 24 July (final)
- Competitors: 91 from 81 nations
- Winning time: 22.68

Medalists
gold medal	Thomas Ceccon	Italy
silver medal	Diogo Ribeiro	Portugal
bronze medal	Maxime Grousset	France

The men's 50 metre butterfly competition at the 2023 World Aquatics Championships was held on 23 and 24 July 2023.

== Records ==
Prior to the competition, the existing world and championship records were as follows.

World record	Andriy Govorov (UKR)	22.27	Rome, Italy	1 July 2018
Competition record	Caeleb Dressel (USA)	22.35	Gwangju, South Korea	22 July 2019

== Results ==
=== Heats ===
The heats were started on 23 July at 11:35.

Rank	Heat	Lane	Name	Nationality	Time	Notes
1	8	5	Maxime Grousset	France	22.74	Q, NR
2	9	5	Jacob Peters	Great Britain	22.85	Q
3	8	4	Dylan Carter	Trinidad and Tobago	22.89	Q
4	8	8	Abdelrahman Sameh	Egypt	23.10	Q, NR
5	10	6	Noè Ponti	Switzerland	23.13	Q
6	9	3	Diogo Ribeiro	Portugal	23.14	Q
6	9	4	Thomas Ceccon	Italy	23.14	Q
8	10	5	Nyls Korstanje	Netherlands	23.19	Q
9	9	0	Ilya Kharun	Canada	23.27	Q, =NR
9	9	2	Dare Rose	United States	23.27	Q
9	10	3	Szebasztián Szabó	Hungary	23.27	Q
9	10	4	Benjamin Proud	Great Britain	23.27	Q
13	8	6	Simon Bucher	Austria	23.32	Q
14	7	7	Mario Mollà	Spain	23.34	Q
15	8	7	Joshua Liendo	Canada	23.36	Q
15	10	7	Josif Miladinov	Bulgaria	23.36	Q
17	7	1	Stergios Bilas	Greece	23.39	
18	9	6	Cameron McEvoy	Australia	23.40	
18	10	9	Meiron Cheruti	Israel	23.40	
20	7	2	Nicholas Lia	Norway	23.43	
21	8	2	Andriy Govorov	Ukraine	23.44	
22	7	5	Tomer Frankel	Israel	23.48	
23	6	1	Baek In-chul	South Korea	23.50	=NR
24	8	0	Adilbek Mussin	Kazakhstan	23.55	
25	10	1	Cameron Gray	New Zealand	23.57	
26	8	9	Shaun Champion	Australia	23.60	
27	6	3	Mikel Schreuders	Aruba	23.65	NR
27	7	0	Julien Henx	Luxembourg	23.65	
29	10	8	Shaine Casas	United States	23.69	
30	9	8	Daniel Zaitsev	Estonia	23.73	
30	9	9	Mikkel Lee	Singapore	23.73	
32	7	3	Oskar Hoff	Sweden	23.74	
33	7	9	Tibor Tistan	Slovakia	23.75	
33	8	1	Naoki Mizunuma	Japan	23.75	
35	10	0	Chen Juner	China	23.79	
35	10	2	Takeshi Kawamoto	Japan	23.79	
37	9	7	Wang Changhao	China	23.83	
38	6	4	Adrian Jaskiewicz	Poland	23.84	
39	6	6	Kayky Mota	Brazil	23.85	
40	5	6	Lamar Taylor	Bahamas	23.91	
41	8	3	Teong Tzen Wei	Singapore	23.92	
42	7	6	Miguel Nascimento	Portugal	23.95	
43	7	4	Daniel Gracík	Czech Republic	23.96	
44	6	5	Roland Schoeman	South Africa	24.02	
45	6	7	Jorge Iga	Mexico	24.05	
46	6	2	Jarod Hatch	Suspended Member Federation	24.07	
47	9	1	Piero Codia	Italy	24.13	
48	6	9	Abeiku Jackson	Ghana	24.14	
49	6	0	Ian Ho	Hong Kong	24.20	
50	7	8	Waleed Abdulrazzaq	Kuwait	24.30	
51	5	3	Ben Hockin	Paraguay	24.34	
52	5	1	Guido Buscaglia	Argentina	24.47	
53	5	8	Bryan Leong	Malaysia	24.54	
54	5	2	Lương Jeremie Loic Nino	Vietnam	24.56	
55	5	0	Matthew Lawrence	Mozambique	24.70	
56	5	5	Emre Sakçı	Turkey	24.72	
57	5	9	Sajan Prakash	India	24.93	
58	5	7	Joe Kurniawan	Indonesia	25.05	
59	5	4	Emil Pérez	Venezuela	25.22	
60	4	2	Adriel Sanes	U.S. Virgin Islands	25.28	
61	4	4	Salvador Gordo	Angola	25.48	
62	2	5	Alex Joachim	Saint Vincent and the Grenadines	25.58	NR
62	4	1	Kokoro Frost	Samoa	25.58	NR
64	4	5	Mohamad Masoud	Athlete Refugee Team	25.73	
65	4	6	Finau Ohuafi	Tonga	25.85	
66	4	7	Diego Aranda	Uruguay	25.87	
67	4	8	Salem Sabt	United Arab Emirates	25.95	
68	4	3	Jeno Heyns	Suriname	26.21	
69	2	6	Damien Shamambo	Zambia	26.46	
70	3	3	Adnan Kabuye	Uganda	26.54	
71	4	9	Phansovannarun Montross	Cambodia	26.95	
72	3	4	Fakhriddin Madkamov	Tajikistan	27.10	
73	3	5	Nathaniel Noka	Papua New Guinea	27.46	
74	1	5	Hilal Hilal	Tanzania	27.68	
75	4	0	Alassane Seydou	Niger	27.91	
76	3	1	Fodé Amara Camara	Guinea	28.42	NR
77	3	6	Souleymane Napare	Burkina Faso	28.49	
78	2	3	Ailton Lima	Cape Verde	28.66	
79	2	2	Nicky Irakoze	Burundi	28.94	
80	3	2	Houmed Houssein Barkat	Djibouti	29.02	
81	2	1	Slava Sihanouvong	Laos	29.13	
82	2	7	Pap Jonga	Gambia	29.78	
83	3	8	Tilahun Malede	Ethiopia	29.80	
84	1	4	Giorgio Nguichie Kamseu Kamogne	Cameroon	29.93	NR
85	2	8	Aseel Khousrof	Yemen	29.99	
86	3	7	Joshua Wyse	Sierra Leone	30.08	
87	3	0	Muhammad Ali Moosa	Malawi	31.57	
88	3	9	Magnim Jordano Daou	Togo	32.22	
89	2	4	Refiloe Chopho	Lesotho	34.21	NR
	1	3	David Young	Fiji	DSQ	
	2	0	Mohammed Qatat	Libya	DSQ	
	6	8	Jaouad Syoud	Algeria	DNS	

=== Semifinals ===
The semifinals were started on 23 July at 20:23.

Rank	Heat	Lane	Name	Nationality	Time	Notes
1	2	4	Maxime Grousset	France	22.72	Q, NR
2	1	2	Dare Rose	United States	22.79	Q
3	1	4	Jacob Peters	Great Britain	22.92	Q
3	2	6	Thomas Ceccon	Italy	22.92	Q
5	1	5	Abdelrahman Sameh	Egypt	22.94	Q, NR
6	1	7	Benjamin Proud	Great Britain	22.96	Q
7	1	3	Diogo Ribeiro	Portugal	23.04	Q
8	2	1	Simon Bucher	Austria	23.05	NR
8	2	5	Dylan Carter	Trinidad and Tobago	23.05	
10	1	1	Mario Mollà	Spain	23.16	
10	2	7	Szebasztián Szabó	Hungary	23.16	
12	1	6	Nyls Korstanje	Netherlands	23.23	
13	2	3	Noè Ponti	Switzerland	23.26	
14	2	2	Ilya Kharun	Canada	23.27	=NR
15	2	8	Joshua Liendo	Canada	23.33	
16	1	8	Josif Miladinov	Bulgaria	23.40	

=== Swim-off ===
The swim-off was started on 23 July at 22:16.

Rank	Lane	Name	Nationality	Time	Notes
1	4	Simon Bucher	Austria	23.10	Q
2	5	Dylan Carter	Trinidad and Tobago	23.26	

=== Final ===
The final was started on 24 July at 21:32.

Rank	Lane	Name	Nationality	Time	Notes
1st place, gold medalist(s)	6	Thomas Ceccon	Italy	22.68	NR
2nd place, silver medalist(s)	1	Diogo Ribeiro	Portugal	22.80	
3rd place, bronze medalist(s)	4	Maxime Grousset	France	22.82	
4	3	Jacob Peters	Great Britain	22.84	
5	7	Benjamin Proud	Great Britain	22.91	
6	5	Dare Rose	United States	23.01	
7	8	Simon Bucher	Austria	23.26	
8	2	Abdelrahman Sameh	Egypt	23.34	
