= Burkina Faso at the 2015 World Aquatics Championships =

- Flag of Burkina Faso
- FINA code: BUR
- National federation: Burkinabé Swimming and Life Saving Federation

in Kazan, Russia
- Competitors: 3 in 1 sport
- Medals: Gold 0 Silver 0 Bronze 0 Total 0

World Aquatics Championships appearances
- 1973; 1975; 1978; 1982; 1986; 1991; 1994; 1998; 2001; 2003; 2005; 2007; 2009; 2011; 2013; 2015; 2017; 2019; 2022; 2023; 2024

Burkina Faso competed at the 2015 World Aquatics Championships in Kazan, Russia from 24 July to 9 August 2015.

== Swimming ==
Burkina swimmers have achieved qualifying standards in the following events (up to a maximum of 2 swimmers in each event at the A-standard entry time, and 1 at the B-standard):

Men

Athlete	Event	Heat		Semifinal		Final	
Athlete	Event	Time	Rank	Time	Rank	Time	Rank
Omar Barry	50 m breaststroke	41.33	74	did not advance			
Tindwende Sawadogo	50 m freestyle	28.39	107	did not advance			

Women

Athlete	Event	Heat		Semifinal		Final	
Athlete	Event	Time	Rank	Time	Rank	Time	Rank
Angelika Ouedraogo	50 m freestyle	30.74	96	did not advance			
Angelika Ouedraogo	50 m breaststroke	39.25	62	did not advance			
