= Cameroon at the 2024 World Aquatics Championships =

- Flag of Cameroon
- FINA code: CMR
- National federation: Fédération Camerounaise de Natation et de Sauvetage

in Doha, Qatar
- Competitors: 3 in 1 sport
- Medals: Gold 0 Silver 0 Bronze 0 Total 0

World Aquatics Championships appearances
- 2003; 2005; 2007; 2009; 2011; 2013; 2015; 2017; 2019; 2022; 2023; 2024

Cameroon competed at the 2024 World Aquatics Championships in Doha, Qatar from 2 to 18 February.

== Competitors ==
The following is the list of competitors in the Championships.

Sport	Men	Women	Total
Swimming	2	1	3
Total	2	1	3

== Swimming ==
Cameroon entered 3 swimmers.

Men

Athlete	Event	Heat		Semifinal		Final	
Athlete	Event	Time	Rank	Time	Rank	Time	Rank
Charly Ndjoume	50 metre freestyle	27.69	105	Did not advance			
Giorgio Armani Nguichie Kamseu Kamogne	100 metre freestyle	1:02.20	101	Did not advance			
Giorgio Armani Nguichie Kamseu Kamogne	50 metre backstroke	33.95	44	Did not advance			

Women

Athlete	Event	Heat		Semifinal		Final	
Athlete	Event	Time	Rank	Time	Rank	Time	Rank
Grace Manuela Nguelo'O	50 metre freestyle	32.20	99	Did not advance			
Grace Manuela Nguelo'O	50 metre butterfly	35.96	54	Did not advance			
