= Cameroon at the 2015 World Aquatics Championships =

- Flag of Cameroon
- FINA code: CMR
- National federation: Cameroon Swimming and Life Saving Federation

in Kazan, Russia
- Competitors: 3 in 1 sport
- Medals: Gold 0 Silver 0 Bronze 0 Total 0

World Aquatics Championships appearances
- 2003; 2005; 2007; 2009; 2011; 2013; 2015; 2017; 2019; 2022; 2023; 2024

Cameroon competed at the 2015 World Aquatics Championships in Kazan, Russia from 24 July, to 9 August, 2015.

== Swimming ==
Cameroonian swimmers have achieved qualifying standards in the following events (up to a maximum of 2 swimmers in each event at the A-standard entry time, and 1 at the B-standard):

Men

Athlete	Event	Heat		Semifinal		Final	
Athlete	Event	Time	Rank	Time	Rank	Time	Rank
Stephane Fokam	50 m breaststroke	DNS		did not advance			
Stephane Fokam	100 m breaststroke	DNS		did not advance			
Charly Ndjoume	50 m freestyle	DNS		did not advance			
Charly Ndjoume	50 m butterfly	DNS		did not advance			

Women

Athlete	Event	Heat		Semifinal		Final	
Athlete	Event	Time	Rank	Time	Rank	Time	Rank
Liza Kafack	50 m freestyle	DNS		did not advance			
Liza Kafack	100 m freestyle	DNS		did not advance			
