= Burkina Faso at the 2019 World Aquatics Championships =

- Flag of Burkina Faso
- FINA code: BUR
- National federation: Federation Burkinabe de Natation et de Sauvetage

in Gwangju, South Korea
- Competitors: 4 in 1 sport
- Medals: Gold 0 Silver 0 Bronze 0 Total 0

World Aquatics Championships appearances
- 1973; 1975; 1978; 1982; 1986; 1991; 1994; 1998; 2001; 2003; 2005; 2007; 2009; 2011; 2013; 2015; 2017; 2019; 2022; 2023; 2024

Burkina Faso competed at the 2019 World Aquatics Championships in Gwangju, South Korea from 12 to 28 July.

== Swimming ==
Burkina Faso entered four swimmers.

Men

Athlete	Event	Heat		Semifinal		Final	
Athlete	Event	Time	Rank	Time	Rank	Time	Rank
Adama Ouedraogo	50 m freestyle	25.38	=101	did not advance			
Adama Ouedraogo	100 m freestyle	58.27	109	did not advance			
Tindwende Sawadogo	50 m breaststroke	33.97	66	did not advance			

Women

Athlete	Event	Heat		Semifinal		Final	
Athlete	Event	Time	Rank	Time	Rank	Time	Rank
Angelika Ouedraogo	50 m freestyle	29.60	77	did not advance			
Soukeyna Pitroipa	50 m breaststroke	44.18	51	did not advance			
