= Burkina Faso at the 2013 World Aquatics Championships =

- Flag of Burkina Faso
- FINA code: BUR
- National federation: Burkinabé Swimming and Life Saving Federation

in Barcelona, Spain
- Competitors: 3 in 1 sports
- Medals: Gold 0 Silver 0 Bronze 0 Total 0

World Aquatics Championships appearances
- 1973; 1975; 1978; 1982; 1986; 1991; 1994; 1998; 2001; 2003; 2005; 2007; 2009; 2011; 2013; 2015; 2017; 2019; 2022; 2023; 2024

Burkina Faso competed at the 2013 World Aquatics Championships in Barcelona, Spain from 19 July to 4 August 2013.

== Swimming ==
Burkina Faso qualified 4 quota places for the following swimming events:

Men

Athlete	Event	Heat		Semifinal		Final	
Athlete	Event	Time	Rank	Time	Rank	Time	Rank
Tarnagda Hamadou	50 m freestyle	31.10	103	did not advance			
Thierry Sawadogo	50 m breaststroke	34.60	74	did not advance			

Women

Athlete	Event	Heat		Semifinal		Final	
Athlete	Event	Time	Rank	Time	Rank	Time	Rank
Angelika Ouedraogo	50 m freestyle	31.68	76	did not advance			
Angelika Ouedraogo	50 m breaststroke	39.58	71	did not advance			
