= Burkina Faso at the 2023 World Aquatics Championships =

- Flag of Burkina Faso
- FINA code: BUR
- National federation: Fédération Burkinabé de Natation et de Sauvetage

in Fukuoka, Japan
- Competitors: 2 in 1 sport
- Medals: Gold 0 Silver 0 Bronze 0 Total 0

World Aquatics Championships appearances
- 1973; 1975; 1978; 1982; 1986; 1991; 1994; 1998; 2001; 2003; 2005; 2007; 2009; 2011; 2013; 2015; 2017; 2019; 2022; 2023; 2024

Burkina Faso is set to compete at the 2023 World Aquatics Championships in Fukuoka, Japan from 14 to 30 July.

== Swimming ==
Burkina Faso entered 2 swimmers.

Men

Athlete	Event	Heat		Semifinal		Final	
Athlete	Event	Time	Rank	Time	Rank	Time	Rank
Souleymane Napare	50 metre freestyle	26.85	100	Did not advance			
Souleymane Napare	50 metre butterfly	28.49	77	Did not advance			

Women

Athlete	Event	Heat		Semifinal		Final	
Athlete	Event	Time	Rank	Time	Rank	Time	Rank
Iman Kouraogo	50 metre freestyle	31.06	88	Did not advance			
Iman Kouraogo	100 metre freestyle	1:10.65	75	Did not advance			
