= Burkina Faso at the 2022 World Aquatics Championships =

- Flag of Burkina Faso
- FINA code: BUR
- National federation: Federation Burkinabe de Natation et de Sauvetage

in Budapest, Hungary
- Competitors: 2 in 1 sport
- Medals: Gold 0 Silver 0 Bronze 0 Total 0

World Aquatics Championships appearances
- 1973; 1975; 1978; 1982; 1986; 1991; 1994; 1998; 2001; 2003; 2005; 2007; 2009; 2011; 2013; 2015; 2017; 2019; 2022; 2023; 2024

Burkina Faso competed at the 2022 World Aquatics Championships in Budapest, Hungary from 17 June to 3 July.

== Swimming ==
Burkina Faso entered two swimmers.

Men

Athlete	Event	Heat		Semifinal		Final	
Athlete	Event	Time	Rank	Time	Rank	Time	Rank
Souleymane Napare	50 m freestyle	DNS		Did not advance			
Souleymane Napare	50 m butterfly	DNS		Did not advance			

Women

Athlete	Event	Heat		Semifinal		Final	
Athlete	Event	Time	Rank	Time	Rank	Time	Rank
Iman Kouraogo	50 m freestyle	DNS		Did not advance			
Iman Kouraogo	50 m breaststroke	DNS		Did not advance			
