= Cameroon at the 2011 World Aquatics Championships =

- Flag of Cameroon
- FINA code: CMR
- National federation: Cameroon Swimming and Life Saving Federation

in Shanghai, China
- Competitors: 2 in 1 sports
- Medals: Gold 0 Silver 0 Bronze 0 Total 0

World Aquatics Championships appearances
- 2003; 2005; 2007; 2009; 2011; 2013; 2015; 2017; 2019; 2022; 2023; 2024

Cameroon competed at the 2011 World Aquatics Championships in Shanghai, China between July 16 and 31, 2011.

== Swimming ==
Cameroon qualified 2 swimmers.

Men

Athlete	Event	Heats		Semifinals		Final	
Athlete	Event	Time	Rank	Time	Rank	Time	Rank
Fdingue Ekane	50 m freestyle	27.58	85	did not advance			
Fdingue Ekane	100 m freestyle	1:02.65	97	did not advance			
Fdingue Ekane	50 m breaststroke	34.34	43	did not advance			
Fdingue Ekane	100 m breaststroke	1:19.30	79	did not advance			

Women

Athlete	Event	Heats		Semifinals		Final	
Athlete	Event	Time	Rank	Time	Rank	Time	Rank
Antoinette Guedia Mouafo	50 m freestyle	30.84	64	did not advance			
Antoinette Guedia Mouafo	100 m freestyle	1:09.28	71	did not advance			
Antoinette Guedia Mouafo	50 m backstroke	39.02	57	did not advance			
Antoinette Guedia Mouafo	50 m breaststroke	40.15	29	did not advance			
Antoinette Guedia Mouafo	100 m breaststroke	1:30.56	45	did not advance			
