= Burkina Faso at the 2024 World Aquatics Championships =

- Flag of Burkina Faso
- FINA code: BUR
- National federation: Fédération Burkinabé de Natation et de Sauvetage

in Doha, Qatar
- Competitors: 2 in 1 sport
- Medals: Gold 0 Silver 0 Bronze 0 Total 0

World Aquatics Championships appearances
- 1973; 1975; 1978; 1982; 1986; 1991; 1994; 1998; 2001; 2003; 2005; 2007; 2009; 2011; 2013; 2015; 2017; 2019; 2022; 2023; 2024

Burkina Faso competed at the 2024 World Aquatics Championships in Doha, Qatar from 2 to 18 February.

== Competitors ==
The following is the list of competitors in the Championships.

Sport	Men	Women	Total
Swimming	1	1	2
Total	1	1	2

== Swimming ==
Burkina Faso entered 2 swimmers.

Men

Athlete	Event	Heat		Semifinal		Final	
Athlete	Event	Time	Rank	Time	Rank	Time	Rank
Souleymane Napare	50 metre freestyle	26.51	93	Did not advance			
Souleymane Napare	50 metre butterfly	28.22	55	Did not advance			

Women

Athlete	Event	Heat		Semifinal		Final	
Athlete	Event	Time	Rank	Time	Rank	Time	Rank
Iman Kouraogo	50 metre freestyle	30.89	88	Did not advance			
Iman Kouraogo	100 metre freestyle	1:12.41	80	Did not advance			
