= Cameroon at the 2022 World Aquatics Championships =

- Flag of Cameroon
- FINA code: CMR
- National federation: Fédération Camerounaise de Natation et Sauvetage

in Budapest, Hungary
- Competitors: 1 in 1 sport
- Medals: Gold 0 Silver 0 Bronze 0 Total 0

World Aquatics Championships appearances
- 2003; 2005; 2007; 2009; 2011; 2013; 2015; 2017; 2019; 2022; 2023; 2024

Cameroon competed at the 2022 World Aquatics Championships in Budapest, Hungary from 18 June to 3 July.

== Swimming ==
Cameroonian swimmers have achieved qualifying standards in the following events.

Athlete	Event	Heat		Semifinal		Final	
Athlete	Event	Time	Rank	Time	Rank	Time	Rank
Norah Milanesi	Women's 50 m freestyle	26.99	43	did not advance			
Norah Milanesi	Women's 50 m butterfly	28.66	42	did not advance			
