= Cameroon at the 2023 World Aquatics Championships =

- Flag of Cameroon
- FINA code: CMR
- National federation: Fédération Camerounaise de Natation et de Sauvetage

in Fukuoka, Japan
- Competitors: 3 in 1 sport
- Medals: Gold 0 Silver 0 Bronze 0 Total 0

World Aquatics Championships appearances
- 2003; 2005; 2007; 2009; 2011; 2013; 2015; 2017; 2019; 2022; 2023; 2024

Cameroon is set to compete at the 2023 World Aquatics Championships in Fukuoka, Japan from 14 to 30 July.

== Swimming ==
Cameroon entered 3 swimmers.

Men

| Athlete | Event | Heat | | Semifinal | | Final | |
| Athlete | Event | Time | Rank | Time | Rank | Time | Rank |
|---|---|---|---|---|---|---|---|
| Hugo Nguichie | 50 metre freestyle | Disqualified | | Did not advance | | | |
| Hugo Nguichie | 100 metre freestyle | 1:03.00 NR | 111 | Did not advance | | | |
| Giorgio Armani Nguichie Kamseu Kamogne | 50 metre backstroke | 33.75 | 63 | Did not advance | | | |
| Giorgio Armani Nguichie Kamseu Kamogne | 50 metre butterfly | 29.93 | 84 | Did not advance | | | |

Women

| Athlete | Event | Heat | | Semifinal | | Final | |
| Athlete | Event | Time | Rank | Time | Rank | Time | Rank |
|---|---|---|---|---|---|---|---|
| Estelle Nguelo'o Noubissi | 50 metre freestyle | 33.23 | 95 | Did not advance | | | |
| Estelle Nguelo'o Noubissi | 50 metre breaststroke | 43.59 | 48 | Did not advance | | | |
