= The Gambia at the 2023 World Aquatics Championships =

- Flag of the Gambia
- World Aquatics code: GAM
- National federation: Gambia Swimming & Aquatic Sports Association

in Fukuoka, Japan
- Competitors: 3 in 1 sport
- Medals: Gold 0 Silver 0 Bronze 0 Total 0

World Aquatics Championships appearances
- 1973; 1975; 1978; 1982; 1986; 1991; 1994; 1998; 2001; 2003; 2005; 2007; 2009; 2011; 2013; 2015; 2017; 2019; 2022; 2023; 2024; 2025

Gambia is set to compete at the 2023 World Aquatics Championships in Fukuoka, Japan from 14 to 30 July.

== Swimming ==
Gambia entered 3 swimmers.

Men

Athlete	Event	Heat		Semifinal		Final	
Athlete	Event	Time	Rank	Time	Rank	Time	Rank
Ousman Jobe	50 metre freestyle	28.47	112	Did not advance			
Ousman Jobe	50 metre breaststroke	41.77	59	Did not advance			
Pap Jonga	100 metre freestyle	1:05.48	113	Did not advance			
Pap Jonga	50 metre butterfly	29.78	82	Did not advance			

Women

Athlete	Event	Heat		Semifinal		Final	
Athlete	Event	Time	Rank	Time	Rank	Time	Rank
Aminata Barrow	100 metre breaststroke	1:14.32	51	Did not advance			
Aminata Barrow	200 metre breaststroke	2:37.01	28	Did not advance			
