= Togo at the 2023 World Aquatics Championships =

- Flag of Togo
- FINA code: TOG
- National federation: Fédération Togolaise de Natation et de Sauvetage

in Fukuoka, Japan
- Competitors: 2 in 1 sport
- Medals: Gold 0 Silver 0 Bronze 0 Total 0

World Aquatics Championships appearances
- 1998; 2001–2007; 2009; 2011; 2013; 2015; 2017; 2019; 2022; 2023; 2024

Togo is set to compete at the 2023 World Aquatics Championships in Fukuoka, Japan from 14 to 30 July.

== Swimming ==
Togo entered 2 swimmers.

Men

Athlete	Event	Heat		Semifinal		Final	
Athlete	Event	Time	Rank	Time	Rank	Time	Rank
Magnim Jordano Daou	50 metre freestyle	28.26	110	Did not advance			
Magnim Jordano Daou	50 metre butterfly	32.22	32	Did not advance			

Women

Athlete	Event	Heat		Semifinal		Final	
Athlete	Event	Time	Rank	Time	Rank	Time	Rank
Marie Amenou	50 metre freestyle	33.44	96	Did not advance			
Marie Amenou	50 metre butterfly	39.50	63	Did not advance			
