= List of Cameroonian records in swimming =

The Cameroonian records in swimming are the fastest ever performances of swimmers from Cameroon, which are recognised and ratified by the Fédération Camerounaise de Natation et de Sauvetage.

All records were set in finals unless noted otherwise.

== Long Course (50 m) ==
=== Men ===
Event	Time		Name	Club	Date	Meet	Location	Ref
50 m freestyle	27.22	h	Charly Ndjoume	Cameroon	30 July 2021	Olympic Games	Tokyo, Japan	
100 m freestyle	1:02.20	h	Giorgio Nguichie	Cameroon	14 February 2024	World Championships	Doha, Qatar	
200 m freestyle								
400 m freestyle								
800 m freestyle								
1500 m freestyle								
50 m backstroke	33.75	h	Giorgio Nguichie	Cameroon	29 July 2023	World Championships	Fukuoka, Japan	
100 m backstroke								
200 m backstroke								
50 m breaststroke	40.01	h	Fabrice Cabrell Guedia Zeutsop	Cameroon	21 August 2014	Youth Olympic Games	Nanjing, China	
100 m breaststroke								
200 m breaststroke								
50 m butterfly	28.79	h	Claudio Yelegou	Cameroon	30 April 2024	African Championships	Luanda, Angola	
100 m butterfly								
200 m butterfly								
200 m individual medley								
400 m individual medley								
4×100 m freestyle relay								
4×200 m freestyle relay								
4×100 m medley relay								

Legend: # – Record awaiting ratification by Fédération Camerounaise de Natation et de Sauvetage; WR – World record; AF – African record;
Records not set in finals: h – heat; sf – semifinal; r – relay 1st leg; rh – relay heat 1st leg; b – B final; † – en route to final mark; tt – time trial

=== Women ===
Event	Time		Name	Club	Date	Meet	Location	Ref
50 m freestyle	26.41	h	Norah Milanesi	Cameroon	30 July 2021	Olympic Games	Tokyo, Japan	
100 m freestyle	58.42		Norah Milanesi	Cameroon	15 August 2022	Islamic Solidarity Games	Konya, Turkey	
200 m freestyle	2:57.23	h	Gabriella Tchamdjeu	Cameroon	30 April 2024	African Championships	Luanda, Angola	
400 m freestyle								
800 m freestyle								
1500 m freestyle	25:20.17		Gabriella Tchamdjeu	Cameroon	30 April 2024	African Championships	Luanda, Angola	
50 m backstroke								
100 m backstroke								
200 m backstroke								
50 m breaststroke								
100 m breaststroke								
200 m breaststroke								
50 m butterfly	35.47	h	Grace Nguelo'o	Cameroon	30 April 2024	African Championships	Luanda, Angola	
100 m butterfly								
200 m butterfly								
200 m individual medley								
400 m individual medley								
4×100 m freestyle relay								
4×200 m freestyle relay								
4×100 m medley relay								

Legend: # – Record awaiting ratification by Fédération Camerounaise de Natation et de Sauvetage; WR – World record; AF – African record;
Records not set in finals: h – heat; sf – semifinal; r – relay 1st leg; rh – relay heat 1st leg; b – B final; † – en route to final mark; tt – time trial

=== Mixed relay ===
Event	Time		Name	Club	Date	Meet	Location	Ref
4 × 100 m freestyle relay	4:45.45	h	Giorgio Nguichie; Grace Nguelo'o; Gabriella Tchamdjeu; Yves Ndjoume	Cameroon	30 April 2024	African Championships	Luanda, Angola	
4 × 100 m medley relay	5:10.43	h	Grace Nguelo'o; Giorgio Nguichie; Gabriella Tchamdjeu; Claudio Yelegou	Cameroon	30 April 2024	African Championships	Luanda, Angola	

Legend: # – Record awaiting ratification by Fédération Camerounaise de Natation et de Sauvetage; WR – World record; AF – African record;
Records not set in finals: h – heat

== Short Course (25 m) ==
=== Men ===
Event	Time		Name	Club	Date	Meet	Location	Ref
50m freestyle	24.36	h	Mbeh Tanji	Cameroon	13 December 2012	World Championships	Istanbul, Turkey	
100m freestyle	1:00.42	h	Charly Ndjoume	Cameroon	20 December 2021	World Championships	Abu Dhabi, United Arab Emirates	
200 m freestyle								
400 m freestyle								
800 m freestyle								
1500 m freestyle								
50 m backstroke								
100 m backstroke								
200 m backstroke								
50m breaststroke	29.38	h	Mbeh Tanji	Cameroon	15 December 2012	World Championships	Istanbul, Turkey	
100m breaststroke	1:04.97	h	Mbeh Tanji	Cameroon	12 December 2012	World Championships	Istanbul, Turkey	
200 m breaststroke								
50m butterfly	26.82	h	Mbeh Tanji	Cameroon	14 December 2012	World Championships	Istanbul, Turkey	
100 m butterfly								
200 m butterfly								
100 m individual medley								
200 m individual medley								
400 m individual medley								
4×50 m freestyle relay								
4×100 m freestyle relay								
4×200 m freestyle relay								
4×50 m medley relay								
4×100 m medley relay								

Legend: # – Record awaiting ratification by Fédération Camerounaise de Natation et de Sauvetage; WR – World record; AF – African record;
Records not set in finals: h – heat; sf – semifinal; r – relay 1st leg; rh – relay heat 1st leg; b – B final; † – en route to final mark; tt – time trial

=== Women ===
Event	Time		Name	Club	Date	Meet	Location	Ref
50m freestyle	26.96	h	Norah Milanesi	Cameroon	20 December 2021	World Championships	Abu Dhabi, United Arab Emirates	
100 m freestyle								
200 m freestyle								
400 m freestyle								
800 m freestyle								
1500 m freestyle								
50m backstroke								
100m backstroke								
200m backstroke								
50 m breaststroke								
100 m breaststroke								
200 m breaststroke								
50m butterfly	35.03	h	Kibong Tanji	Cameroon	13 December 2012	World Championships	Istanbul, Turkey	
100 m butterfly								
200 m butterfly								
100 m individual medley								
200 m individual medley								
400 m individual medley								
4×50 m freestyle relay								
4×100 m freestyle relay								
4×200 m freestyle relay								
4×50 m medley relay								
4×100 m medley relay								

Legend: # – Record awaiting ratification by Fédération Camerounaise de Natation et de Sauvetage; WR – World record; AF – African record;
Records not set in finals: h – heat; sf – semifinal; r – relay 1st leg; rh – relay heat 1st leg; b – B final; † – en route to final mark; tt – time trial
