= Yemen at the 2013 World Aquatics Championships =

- Flag of Yemen
- World Aquatics code: YEM
- National federation: Yemen Swimming Federation
- Website: yemenswimming.com

in Barcelona, Spain
- Competitors: 2 in 1 sports
- Medals: Gold 0 Silver 0 Bronze 0 Total 0

World Aquatics Championships appearances
- 2005; 2007; 2009; 2011; 2013; 2015; 2017; 2019; 2022; 2023; 2024; 2025

Yemen competed at the 2013 World Aquatics Championships in Barcelona, Spain between 19 July and 4 August 2013.

== Swimming ==
Yemeni swimmers achieved qualifying standards in the following events (up to a maximum of 2 swimmers in each event at the A-standard entry time, and 1 at the B-standard):

Men

Athlete	Event	Heat		Semifinal		Final	
Athlete	Event	Time	Rank	Time	Rank	Time	Rank
Ebrahim Al-Maleki	50 m backstroke	34.84	48	did not advance			
Yousef Al-Nehmi	50 m freestyle	28.75	96	did not advance			
Yousef Al-Nehmi	50 m butterfly	DNS		did not advance			
