= Togo at the 2024 World Aquatics Championships =

- Flag of Togo
- FINA code: TOG
- National federation: Fédération Togolaise de Natation et de Sauvetage

in Doha, Qatar
- Competitors: 2 in 1 sport
- Medals: Gold 0 Silver 0 Bronze 0 Total 0

World Aquatics Championships appearances
- 1998; 2001–2007; 2009; 2011; 2013; 2015; 2017; 2019; 2022; 2023; 2024

Togo competed at the 2024 World Aquatics Championships in Doha, Qatar from 2 to 18 February.

== Competitors ==
The following is the list of competitors in the Championships.

Sport	Men	Women	Total
Swimming	1	1	2
Total	1	1	2

== Swimming ==
Togo entered 2 swimmers.

Men

Athlete	Event	Heat		Semifinal		Final	
Athlete	Event	Time	Rank	Time	Rank	Time	Rank
Magnim Jordano Daou	50 metre freestyle	27.49	103	Did not advance			
Magnim Jordano Daou	100 metre freestyle	1:02.48	103	Did not advance			

Women

Athlete	Event	Heat		Semifinal		Final	
Athlete	Event	Time	Rank	Time	Rank	Time	Rank
Adele Gaitou	50 metre freestyle	Disqualified		Did not advance			
Adele Gaitou	100 metre freestyle	Disqualified		Did not advance			
