= The Gambia at the 2024 World Aquatics Championships =

- Flag of the Gambia
- FINA code: GAM
- National federation: Gambia Swimming & Aquatic Sports Association

in Doha, Qatar
- Competitors: 2 in 1 sport
- Medals: Gold 0 Silver 0 Bronze 0 Total 0

World Aquatics Championships appearances
- 1973; 1975; 1978; 1982; 1986; 1991; 1994; 1998; 2001; 2003; 2005; 2007; 2009; 2011; 2013; 2015; 2017; 2019; 2022; 2023; 2024

Gambia competed at the 2024 World Aquatics Championships in Doha, Qatar from 2 to 18 February.

== Competitors ==
The following is the list of competitors in the Championships.

Sport	Men	Women	Total
Swimming	2	0	2
Total	2	0	2

== Swimming ==
Gambia entered 2 swimmers.

Men

Athlete	Event	Heat		Semifinal		Final	
Athlete	Event	Time	Rank	Time	Rank	Time	Rank
Ousman Jobe	50 metre freestyle	27.34	99	Did not advance			
Ousman Jobe	100 metre freestyle	1:03.76	104	Did not advance			
Pap Jonga	50 metre breaststroke	35.01	55	Did not advance			
Pap Jonga	50 metre butterfly	30.81	64	Did not advance			
