= List of Cameroonian flags =

The following is a list of flags of Cameroon. For more information, see flag of Cameroon.

== National flag and state flag ==
Flag	Date	Use	Description
	1975–present	Flag of Cameroon	A vertical tricolour of green, red, and yellow, with a gold star centred on the red band.

== Flags of political parties ==
Flag	Date	Use	Description
	1956–present	Flag of the Union of the Peoples of Cameroon	A black crab in the center of a red field.
		Flag of the Cameroonian National Union	A red sixteen-pointed sun on a white field.
		Flag of the Social Democratic Front	Scales resting on a white block, inside a thin white circle in the hoist of a green field.

== Separatist movements flags ==
Flag	Date	Use	Description
		Flag of the Bamileke National Movement.	Four equal horizontal bands in the Pan-African colours – from above: green, yellow, red, and black.
		Flag of the Bakassi Movement for Self-Determination.	
		Flag of Ambazonia.	'Ambazonia' is used by proponents of independence for the former British Cameroon to name their desired state. Five blue and four white horizontal bands with a blue canton containing a bird in a circle of thirteen golden stars.

== Historical flags ==
Flag	Date	Use	Description
	1961–1975	Second flag of Cameroon	A vertical tricolour of green, red, and yellow with two gold stars (darker than the yellow band) in the upper half of the green.
	1960–1961	First flag of Cameroon	A vertical tricolour of green, red, and yellow.
	1916–1960	Flag of French Cameroon	A vertical tricolour of blue, white, and red (proportions 3:2).
	1916–1961	Flag of the United Kingdom	A superimposition of the flags of England and Scotland with the Saint Patrick's Saltire (representing Ireland).
	1916–1961	Flag of British Cameroon	A blue ensign with the arms of Cameroon.
	1884–1916	Flag of the German Empire	A tricolour, made of three equal horizontal bands coloured black (top), white, and red (bottom).
	1884–1916	Colonial Flag	A tricolour, made of three equal horizontal bands coloured black (top), white, and red (bottom) with the German Eagle in the center.
	1914	First proposed flag of German Kamerun	A tricolour, made of three equal horizontal bands coloured black (top), white, and red (bottom) with a white elephant on a red shield in the center.
	1914	Second proposed flag of German Kamerun	A tricolour, made of three equal horizontal bands coloured black (top), white, and red (bottom) with a white elephant on a red disc in the center.
	1884–1914	Flag of the German West Africa Company	
	1804–1884	Flag of the Sokoto Caliphate	A simple green field.
	1380–1884	Flag of the Bornu Empire	A brown field with a white crescent moon in the center.
	700–1380	Flag of the Kanem Empire	A white pennon with a green palm tree in the center.

== See also ==
- Flag of Cameroon
- Coat of arms of Cameroon
