= The Gambia at the 2011 World Aquatics Championships =

- Flag of the Gambia
- World Aquatics code: GAM
- National federation: Gambia Swimming and Aquatics Sports Association

in Shanghai, China
- Competitors: 3 in 1 sports
- Medals Ranked -th: Gold 0 Silver 0 Bronze 0 Total 0

World Aquatics Championships appearances
- 1973; 1975; 1978; 1982; 1986; 1991; 1994; 1998; 2001; 2003; 2005; 2007; 2009; 2011; 2013; 2015; 2017; 2019; 2022; 2023; 2024; 2025

The Gambia competed at the 2011 World Aquatics Championships in Shanghai, China between July 16 and 31, 2011.

== Swimming ==
Gambia qualified 3 swimmers.

Men

Athlete	Event	Heats		Semifinals		Final	
Athlete	Event	Time	Rank	Time	Rank	Time	Rank
Mamot Faye	Men's 50m Freestyle	DNS		did not advance			
Folarin Ogunsola	Men's 50m Freestyle	DNS		did not advance			
Folarin Ogunsola	Men's 50m Backstroke	DNS		did not advance			

Women

Athlete	Event	Heats		Semifinals		Final	
Athlete	Event	Time	Rank	Time	Rank	Time	Rank
Sophia Adecky	Women's 50m Freestyle	DNS		did not advance			
