= 2014 FINA World Swimming Championships (25 m) – Men's 50 metre freestyle =

Men's 50 metre freestyle at the 2014 FINA World Swimming Championships (25 m)
- Dates: 4 December (heats and semifinals); 5 December (final)
- Competitors: 174 from 115 nations
- Winning time: 20.26

Medalists
gold medal	Florent Manaudou	France
silver medal	Marco Orsi	Italy
bronze medal	César Cielo	Brazil

The Men's 50 metre freestyle competition of the 2014 FINA World Swimming Championships (25 m) was held on 4 December with the heats and the semifinals and 5 December with the final.

== Records ==
Prior to the competition, the existing world and championship records were as follows.

	Name	Nation	Time	Location	Date
World record	Roland Schoeman	South Africa	20.30	Pietermaritzburg	8 August 2009
Championship record	César Cielo	Brazil	20.51	Dubai	17 December 2010

The following records were established during the competition:

Date	Event	Name	Nation	Time	Record
5 December	Final	Florent Manaudou	France	20.26	WR

== Results ==
=== Heats ===
The heats were held at 10:59.

Rank	Heat	Lane	Name	Nationality	Time	Notes
1	17	4	César Cielo	Brazil	21.00	Q
2	17	5	Marco Orsi	Italy	21.02	Q
3	16	4	Vladimir Morozov	Russia	21.08	Q
4	16	5	Josh Schneider	United States	21.11	Q
4	18	4	Florent Manaudou	France	21.11	Q
6	18	5	Oleg Tikhobaev	Russia	21.20	Q
7	18	3	Andriy Hovorov	Ukraine	21.24	Q
8	16	3	Shinri Shioura	Japan	21.25	Q
9	16	6	Ning Zetao	China	21.26	Q
10	15	6	Clément Mignon	France	21.37	Q
11	17	2	François Heersbrandt	Belgium	21.45	Q
12	18	6	Matthew Abood	Australia	21.46	Q
13	17	3	Jimmy Feigen	United States	21.48	Q
14	17	6	Cameron McEvoy	Australia	21.50	Q
15	16	0	Ben Proud	Great Britain	21.52	Q
16	17	7	Alan Vitória	Brazil	21.62	Q
17	16	2	Jasper Aerents	Belgium	21.63	
18	12	1	Cristian Quintero	Venezuela	21.65	
19	16	7	Luca Dotto	Italy	21.69	
19	18	2	Ari-Pekka Liukkonen	Finland	21.69	
21	16	1	Brett Fraser	Cayman Islands	21.78	
22	15	2	Pjotr Degtjarjov	Estonia	21.79	
23	14	4	Roy-Allan Burch	Bermuda	21.81	
24	18	1	Oussama Sahnoune	Algeria	21.83	
25	16	9	Boris Stojanović	Serbia	21.86	
25	17	9	Luke Pendock	South Africa	21.86	
27	17	0	Yauhen Tsurkin	Belarus	21.89	
28	15	5	Yuki Kawachi	Japan	21.91	
29	14	7	Alexandre Haldemann	Switzerland	21.93	
30	13	5	Daniel Carranza	Mexico	21.94	
31	15	4	Mario Todorović	Croatia	21.97	
32	16	8	Renzo Tjon-A-Joe	Suriname	21.98	
33	12	8	David Gamburg	Israel	22.03	
34	18	8	Mindaugas Sadauskas	Lithuania	22.06	
35	15	8	Hanser García	Cuba	22.07	
36	17	1	Yu Hexin	China	22.08	
37	14	0	Clayton Jimmie	South Africa	22.10	
37	15	3	Federico Grabich	Argentina	22.10	
39	17	8	Bogdan Plavin	Ukraine	22.13	
40	15	7	Joshua McLeod	Trinidad and Tobago	22.14	
41	13	6	Péter Holoda	Hungary	22.15	
42	13	3	Ryan Pini	Papua New Guinea	22.16	
42	15	0	Julien Henx	Luxembourg	22.16	
44	13	4	Elvis Burrows	Bahamas	22.18	
45	15	1	Ivan Levaj	Croatia	22.22	
46	18	9	Marius Radu	Romania	22.24	
47	14	5	Oliver Elliot	Chile	22.35	
48	12	3	Apostolos Christou	Greece	22.43	
49	12	4	Hüseyin Sakçı	Turkey	22.45	
49	14	2	Chang Kuo-chi	Chinese Taipei	22.45	
51	18	0	Nazim Belkhodja	Algeria	22.47	
52	14	1	Tadas Duškinas	Lithuania	22.49	
53	14	6	Gabriel Melconian Alvez	Uruguay	22.72	
54	13	2	Jevon Atkinson	Jamaica	22.75	
55	11	6	Matthew Zammit	Malta	22.77	
56	13	0	Zuhayr Pigot	Suriname	22.79	
57	15	9	Abraham McLeod	Trinidad and Tobago	22.83	
58	10	3	Meli Malani	Fiji	22.89	
59	14	9	Chad Idensohn	Zimbabwe	22.91	
60	11	2	Peter Wetzlar	Zimbabwe	22.96	
61	12	6	Vahan Mkhitaryan	Armenia	23.00	
62	13	9	Stanislav Karnaukhov	Kyrgyzstan	23.01	
63	12	0	Daniil Tulupov	Uzbekistan	23.02	
64	14	8	Janis Saltans	Latvia	23.04	
65	13	1	Mohammad Madwa	Kuwait	23.05	
66	11	8	Raoul Stafrace	Malta	23.06	
67	11	1	Arnel Dudić	Bosnia and Herzegovina	23.10	
68	13	7	Ng Chun Nam Derick	Hong Kong	23.11	
69	12	7	Mikel Schreuders	Aruba	23.12	
70	13	8	Mak Ho Lun Raymond	Hong Kong	23.16	
71	12	9	Jeremy Kostons	Curaçao	23.20	
72	11	4	Alexandre Bakhtiarov	Cyprus	23.21	
73	11	9	Gavin Lewis	Thailand	23.22	
74	10	7	Kitiphat Pipimnan	Thailand	23.24	
75	11	5	Abdoul Niane	Senegal	23.24	
76	9	2	Nico Campbell	Jamaica	23.29	
77	14	3	Bradley Vincent	Mauritius	23.31	
78	10	4	Gálvez Capriles	Dominican Republic	23.32	
79	9	6	Winter Heaven	Samoa	23.38	
80	9	5	Isaac Beitia	Panama	23.47	
81	10	9	Oumar Touré	Mali	23.49	
82	11	3	Rodrigo Suriano	El Salvador	23.53	
83	8	4	Farhan Saleh	Bahrain	23.64	
84	10	5	Kevin Avila Soto	Guatemala	23.67	
85	9	3	Mathieu Marquet	Mauritius	23.73	
86	9	0	Axel Ngui	Philippines	23.75	
87	9	8	Cherantha de Silva	Sri Lanka	23.90	
88	11	0	Ahmed Al-Hosani	United Arab Emirates	24.03	
89	7	5	Aldo Castillo	Bolivia	24.08	
90	6	6	Valentin Gorshkov	Turkmenistan	24.10	
90	8	9	Abel Fazekas	Azerbaijan	24.10	
92	7	3	Patrick Groters	Aruba	24.12	
93	9	7	Jim Sanderson	Gibraltar	24.14	
94	6	1	Rafael Sta	Philippines	24.15	
95	9	9	Dulguun Batsaikhan	Mongolia	24.21	
95	8	8	Stanford Kawale	Papua New Guinea	24.21	
97	8	2	Mahmoud Daaboul	Lebanon	24.38	
97	10	1	Omar Al-Malki	Bahrain	24.38	
99	10	8	Adama Ndir	Senegal	24.42	
100	8	6	Omar Hesham	Qatar	24.43	
101	6	3	Dean Hoffman	Seychelles	24.49	
102	9	1	Miguel Mena	Nicaragua	24.51	
103	6	2	Cristian Santi	San Marino	24.52	
104	6	4	Noah Mascoll-Gomes	Antigua and Barbuda	24.60	
104	8	0	Charlie Salame	Lebanon	24.60	
104	10	6	Waleed Abdulrazzaq	Kuwait	24.60	
107	6	0	Jesús Flores	Honduras	24.63	
108	8	5	Sio Ka Kun	Macau	24.66	
109	10	0	Christopher Duenas	Guam	24.71	
110	5	7	Andrew Hopkin	Grenada	24.72	
111	9	4	Maksim Bakharev	Kyrgyzstan	24.75	
112	8	3	Christian Nikles	Brunei	24.76	
113	5	3	Mohammad Abdo	Palestine	24.80	
114	7	6	Arnoldo Herrera	Costa Rica	24.81	
115	11	7	Wong Pok Iao	Macau	24.85	
116	7	0	Pierre-Andre Adam	Seychelles	24.90	
117	5	6	Giordan Harris	Marshall Islands	24.92	
118	8	1	Alex Sobers	Barbados	24.98	
119	8	7	Kgosietsile Molefinyane	Botswana	25.03	
120	4	2	Matthew Shone	Zambia	25.07	
120	6	7	Nikolas Sylvester	Saint Vincent and the Grenadines	25.07	
122	7	7	J'Air Smith	Antigua and Barbuda	25.16	
123	6	5	Gianluca Pasolini	San Marino	25.19	
123	7	9	González Leonardo	Honduras	25.19	
125	7	8	Syed Javaid	Pakistan	25.21	
126	5	4	Kamran Jafarov	Azerbaijan	25.26	
127	7	2	Brandon Schuster	Samoa	25.28	
128	5	1	Corey Ollivierre	Grenada	25.60	
129	5	0	Kwesi Jackson	Ghana	25.70	
130	3	1	Rami Abunahla	Palestine	25.74	
131	4	3	Ibrahim Nishwan	Maldives	25.85	
132	7	1	Mamadou Soumaré	Mali	25.90	
133	4	0	Rony Bakale	Republic of the Congo	25.91	
134	4	6	Justine Rodriguez	Federated States of Micronesia	25.95	
135	5	5	Deni Baholli	Albania	26.01	
136	4	5	Tanner Poppe	Guam	26.05	
137	6	9	Abdulrahman Al-Kawari	Qatar	26.07	
138	3	3	Thol Thoeun	Cambodia	26.09	
139	4	7	Temaruata Strickland	Cook Islands	26.21	
140	6	8	Umarkhon Alizoda	Tajikistan	26.23	
141	3	4	Elisha Tibatemwa	Uganda	26.41	
142	7	4	Chaoili Chaoili	Comoros	26.47	
143	2	2	Tongli Panuve	Tonga	26.52	
144	5	9	Sylla Alassane	Ivory Coast	26.57	
145	3	6	Sirish Gurung	Nepal	26.67	
146	3	5	Dionisio Augustine	Federated States of Micronesia	26.68	
147	3	2	Mohamed Adnan	Maldives	26.70	
148	1	8	Sawadogo Tindwende	Burkina Faso	26.76	NR
149	4	8	Aleksander Ngresi	Albania	26.81	
150	2	6	Miraj Prajapati	Nepal	26.86	
151	3	7	Andrew Fowler	Guyana	26.90	
152	2	5	Takumi Sugie	Northern Mariana Islands	26.94	
153	3	9	Aliasger Karimjee	Tanzania	26.96	
154	4	1	Omar Adams	Guyana	26.97	
155	4	4	Billy-Scott Irakoze	Burundi	27.02	
156	2	4	Shawn Dingilius	Palau	27.07	
157	3	8	Thonponloeu Hem	Cambodia	27.09	
158	4	9	Storm Hablich	Saint Vincent and the Grenadines	27.39	
159	5	8	Atta Atta	Ivory Coast	27.78	
160	5	2	Albarchir Moctar	Niger	27.83	
161	2	1	Robel Kiros Habte	Ethiopia	27.99	
162	2	3	Idriss Mutankabandi	Burundi	28.60	
163	2	9	Yousef Al-Nehmi	Yemen	28.93	
164	2	8	Sami Al-Sayaghi	Yemen	29.00	
165	1	4	Awoussou Ablam	Benin	29.73	
166	1	5	Abdoul Nignan	Burkina Faso	29.84	
167	1	7	Pap Jonga	Gambia	30.37	
168	1	3	Rayane Alognisso	Benin	30.49	
169	3	0	Christian Nassi	Central African Republic	30.77	
170	1	2	Eric Niyonsaba	Rwanda	31.05	
171	1	6	Ahmed Bourhan	Djibouti	32.66	
172	1	1	Omar Darboe	Gambia	32.73	
173	2	7	Shad Perriere	Central African Republic	36.82	
—	2	0	Jynior Ndinga	Republic of the Congo		DNS
—	12	2	Jamal Chavoshifar	Iran		DNS
—	12	5	Riku Poytakivi	Finland		DNS
—	18	7	Dominik Kozma	Hungary		DNS
—	10	2	David van der Colff	Botswana		DSQ

=== Semifinals ===
The semifinals were held at 18:46.

==== Semifinal 1 ====
Rank	Lane	Name	Nationality	Time	Notes
1	4	Marco Orsi	Italy	21.07	Q
2	1	Cameron McEvoy	Australia	21.14	Q
3	2	Clément Mignon	France	21.19	Q
4	5	Josh Schneider	United States	21.20	Q
5	3	Oleg Tikhobaev	Russia	21.24	
6	6	Shinri Shioura	Japan	21.37	
7	7	Matthew Abood	Australia	21.46	
8	8	Alan Vitória	Brazil	21.52	

==== Semifinal 2 ====
Rank	Lane	Name	Nationality	Time	Notes
1	4	César Cielo	Brazil	20.80	Q
2	5	Vladimir Morozov	Russia	20.88	Q
3	3	Florent Manaudou	France	20.93	Q
4	6	Andriy Hovorov	Ukraine	21.17	Q
5	7	François Heersbrandt	Belgium	21.31	
6	1	Jimmy Feigen	United States	21.33	
7	2	Ning Zetao	China	21.37	
8	8	Ben Proud	Great Britain	21.44	

=== Final ===
The final were held at 19:35.

Rank	Lane	Name	Nationality	Time	Notes
1st place, gold medalist(s)	3	Florent Manaudou	France	20.26	WR
2nd place, silver medalist(s)	6	Marco Orsi	Italy	20.69	
3rd place, bronze medalist(s)	4	César Cielo	Brazil	20.88	
4	5	Vladimir Morozov	Russia	20.89	
5	8	Josh Schneider	United States	20.97	
6	2	Cameron McEvoy	Australia	21.15	
7	7	Andriy Hovorov	Ukraine	21.21	
8	1	Clément Mignon	France	21.35	
