= The Gambia at the 2019 World Aquatics Championships =

- Flag of the Gambia
- World Aquatics code: GAM
- National federation: Gambia Swimming & Aquatic Sports Association

in Gwangju, South Korea
- Competitors: 3 in 1 sport
- Medals: Gold 0 Silver 0 Bronze 0 Total 0

World Aquatics Championships appearances
- 1973; 1975; 1978; 1982; 1986; 1991; 1994; 1998; 2001; 2003; 2005; 2007; 2009; 2011; 2013; 2015; 2017; 2019; 2022; 2023; 2024; 2025

Gambia competed at the 2019 World Aquatics Championships in Gwangju, South Korea from 12 to 28 July.

== Swimming ==
Gambia entered three swimmers.

Men

Athlete	Event	Heat		Semifinal		Final	
Athlete	Event	Time	Rank	Time	Rank	Time	Rank
Ebrima Buaro	50 m freestyle	27.83	119	did not advance			
Momodou Saine	50 m breaststroke	34.64	69	did not advance			

Women

Athlete	Event	Heat		Semifinal		Final	
Athlete	Event	Time	Rank	Time	Rank	Time	Rank
Ida Cham	50 m freestyle	45.44	100	did not advance			
