= Togo at the 2011 World Aquatics Championships =

- Flag of Togo
- FINA code: TOG
- National federation: Federation Togolaise de Natation

in Shanghai, China
- Competitors: 2 in 1 sport
- Medals: Gold 0 Silver 0 Bronze 0 Total 0

World Aquatics Championships appearances
- 1998; 2001–2007; 2009; 2011; 2013; 2015; 2017; 2019; 2022; 2023; 2024

Togo competed at the 2011 World Aquatics Championships in Shanghai, China between July 16 and 31, 2011.

== Swimming ==
Togo had qualified 2 swimmers.

Men

Athlete	Event	Heats		Semifinals		Final	
Athlete	Event	Time	Rank	Time	Rank	Time	Rank
Yao Messa Roger Amegbeto	Men's 50 m breaststroke	41.43	47	did not advance			

Women

Athlete	Event	Heats		Semifinals		Final	
Athlete	Event	Time	Rank	Time	Rank	Time	Rank
Adzo Kpossi	Women's 50 m freestyle	44.60	86	did not advance			
Adzo Kpossi	Women's 50 m butterfly	55.17	51	did not advance			
