= Yemen at the 2017 World Aquatics Championships =

- Flag of Yemen
- FINA code: YEM
- National federation: Yemen Swimming Federation
- Website: yemenswimming.com

in Budapest, Hungary
- Competitors: 3 in 1 sport
- Medals: Gold 0 Silver 0 Bronze 0 Total 0

World Aquatics Championships appearances
- 2005; 2007; 2009; 2011; 2013; 2015; 2017; 2019; 2022; 2023; 2024

Yemen competed at the 2017 World Aquatics Championships in Budapest, Hungary from 14 July to 30 July.

== Swimming ==
Yemen has received a Universality invitation from FINA to send three swimmers (two men and one woman) to the World Championships.

Athlete	Event	Heat		Semifinal		Final	
Athlete	Event	Time	Rank	Time	Rank	Time	Rank
Ebrahim Al-Maleki	Men's 50 m backstroke	34.07	54	did not advance			
Ebrahim Al-Maleki	Men's 50 m breaststroke	38.98	80	did not advance			
Mokhtar Al-Yamani	Men's 100 m freestyle	51.19	61	did not advance			
Mokhtar Al-Yamani	Men's 200 m freestyle	1:49.87	=40	did not advance			
Nooran Ba Matraf	Women's 100 m backstroke	1:12.38	54	did not advance			
Nooran Ba Matraf	Women's 200 m individual medley	2:37.21	36	did not advance			
