= Yemen at the 2022 World Aquatics Championships =

- Flag of Yemen
- FINA code: YEM
- National federation: Yemen Swimming Federation

in Budapest, Hungary
- Medals: Gold 0 Silver 0 Bronze 0 Total 0

World Aquatics Championships appearances
- 2005; 2007; 2009; 2011; 2013; 2015; 2017; 2019; 2022; 2023; 2024

Yemen competed at the 2022 World Aquatics Championships in Budapest, Hungary from 17 June to 3 July.

== Swimming ==
Yemen entered two swimmers.

Men

Athlete	Event	Heat		Semifinal		Final	
Athlete	Event	Time	Rank	Time	Rank	Time	Rank
Aseel Khousrof	50 m freestyle	27.51	83	did not advance			
Aseel Khousrof	50 m backstroke	35.39	49	did not advance			
Basem Rashed	50 m breaststroke	38.14	55	did not advance			
Basem Rashed	50 m butterfly	33.76	70	did not advance			
