= Togo at the 2019 World Aquatics Championships =

- Flag of Togo
- FINA code: TOG
- National federation: Fédération Togolaise de Natation

in Gwangju, South Korea
- Competitors: 3 in 1 sport
- Medals: Gold 0 Silver 0 Bronze 0 Total 0

World Aquatics Championships appearances
- 1998; 2001–2007; 2009; 2011; 2013; 2015; 2017; 2019; 2022; 2023; 2024

Togo competed at the 2019 World Aquatics Championships in Gwangju, South Korea from 12 to 28 July.

== Swimming ==
Togo entered three swimmers.

Men

Athlete	Event	Heat		Semifinal		Final	
Athlete	Event	Time	Rank	Time	Rank	Time	Rank
Darshan Koffi	50 m breaststroke	40.39	77	Did not advance			
Mawupemon Otogbe	50 m freestyle	25.84	110	Did not advance			
Mawupemon Otogbe	400 m freestyle	4:25.30	46	—		Did not advance	

Women

Athlete	Event	Heat		Semifinal		Final	
Athlete	Event	Time	Rank	Time	Rank	Time	Rank
Grace Kadje	50 m freestyle	DNS		Did not advance			
