= Yemen at the 2019 World Aquatics Championships =

- Flag of Yemen
- FINA code: YEM
- National federation: Yemen Swimming Federation

in Gwangju, South Korea
- Medals: Gold 0 Silver 0 Bronze 0 Total 0

World Aquatics Championships appearances
- 2005; 2007; 2009; 2011; 2013; 2015; 2017; 2019; 2022; 2023; 2024

Yemen competed at the 2019 World Aquatics Championships in Gwangju, South Korea from 12 to 28 July.

== Swimming ==
Yemen entered two swimmers.

Men

Athlete	Event	Heat		Semifinal		Final	
Athlete	Event	Time	Rank	Time	Rank	Time	Rank
Mokhtar Al-Yamani	100 m freestyle	51.16	63	did not advance			
Mokhtar Al-Yamani	200 m freestyle	1:50.18	39	did not advance			
Hassan Baidar	50 m freestyle	29.98	127	did not advance			
Hassan Baidar	50 m butterfly	34.70	94	did not advance			
