= Togo at the 2015 World Aquatics Championships =

- Flag of Togo
- FINA code: TOG
- National federation: Federation Togolaise de Natation

in Kazan, Russia
- Competitors: 2 in 1 sport
- Medals: Gold 0 Silver 0 Bronze 0 Total 0

World Aquatics Championships appearances
- 1998; 2001–2007; 2009; 2011; 2013; 2015; 2017; 2019; 2022; 2023; 2024

Togo competed at the 2015 World Aquatics Championships in Kazan, Russia from 24 July to 9 August 2015.

== Swimming ==
Togolese swimmers have achieved qualifying standards in the following events (up to a maximum of 2 swimmers in each event at the A-standard entry time, and 1 at the B-standard):

Men

| Athlete | Event | Heat | | Semifinal | | Final | |
| Athlete | Event | Time | Rank | Time | Rank | Time | Rank |
|---|---|---|---|---|---|---|---|
| Emeric Kpegba | 50 m freestyle | 28.29 | 106 | did not advance | | | |

Women

| Athlete | Event | Heat | | Semifinal | | Final | |
| Athlete | Event | Time | Rank | Time | Rank | Time | Rank |
|---|---|---|---|---|---|---|---|
| Adzo Kpossi | 50 m freestyle | 34.46 | 103 | did not advance | | | |
