= Cameroon at the 2023 World Athletics Championships =

- Flag of Cameroon
- WA code: CMR

in Budapest, Hungary 19 August 2023 – 27 August 2023
- Competitors: 3 (1 man and 2 women)
- Medals: Gold 0 Silver 0 Bronze 0 Total 0

World Athletics Championships appearances
- 1987; 1991; 1993; 1995; 1997; 1999; 2001; 2003; 2005; 2007; 2009; 2011; 2013; 2015; 2017; 2019; 2022; 2023

Cameroon competed at the 2023 World Athletics Championships in Budapest, Hungary, from 19 to 27 August 2023.

== Results ==
Cameroon entered 3 athletes.

Key

- Q = Qualified for the next round
- q = Qualified for the next round as a fastest loser or, in field events, by position without achieving the qualifying target
- NR = National record
- PB = Personal best
- SB = Season best
- N/A = Round not applicable for the event

=== Men ===
Track and road events

| Athlete | Event | Heat | | Semifinal | | Final | |
| Athlete | Event | Result | Rank | Result | Rank | Result | Rank |
|---|---|---|---|---|---|---|---|
| Emmanuel Eseme | 100 metres | 10.41 | 6 | Did not advance | | | |
| Emmanuel Eseme | 200 metres | DNS | | Did not advance | | | |

=== Women ===
Field events

| Athlete | Event | Qualification | | Final | |
| Athlete | Event | Distance | Position | Distance | Position |
|---|---|---|---|---|---|
| Véronique Kossenda Rey | Triple jump | 13.39 | 31 | Did not advance | |
| Nora Monie | Discus throw | 54.50 | 33 | Did not advance | |
