= Togo at the 2017 World Aquatics Championships =

- Flag of Togo
- FINA code: TOG
- National federation: Federation Togolaise de Natation

in Budapest, Hungary
- Competitors: 2 in 1 sport
- Medals: Gold 0 Silver 0 Bronze 0 Total 0

World Aquatics Championships appearances
- 1998; 2001–2007; 2009; 2011; 2013; 2015; 2017; 2019; 2022; 2023; 2024

Togo competed at the 2017 World Aquatics Championships in Budapest, Hungary from 14 to 30 July.

== Swimming ==
Togo received a Universality invitation from FINA to send two swimmers (one man and one woman) to the World Championships.

Athlete	Event	Heat		Semifinal		Final	
Athlete	Event	Time	Rank	Time	Rank	Time	Rank
Kokou Amegashie	Men's 100 m freestyle	1:11.13	111	did not advance			
Adzo Kpossi	Women's 50 m freestyle	32.26	80	did not advance			
