= Yemen at the 2023 World Aquatics Championships =

- Flag of Yemen
- FINA code: YEM
- National federation: Yemen Swimming & Aquatics Federation

in Fukuoka, Japan
- Competitors: 2 in 1 sport
- Medals: Gold 0 Silver 0 Bronze 0 Total 0

World Aquatics Championships appearances
- 2005; 2007; 2009; 2011; 2013; 2015; 2017; 2019; 2022; 2023; 2024

Yemen is set to compete at the 2023 World Aquatics Championships in Fukuoka, Japan from 14 to 30 July.

== Swimming ==
Yemen entered 2 swimmers.

Men

Athlete	Event	Heat		Semifinal		Final	
Athlete	Event	Time	Rank	Time	Rank	Time	Rank
Aseel Khousrof	50 metre freestyle	28.39	111	Did not advance			
Aseel Khousrof	50 metre butterfly	29.99	85	Did not advance			
Hamzah Mayas	50 metre backstroke	39.35	64	Did not advance			
Hamzah Mayas	50 metre breaststroke	40.35	58	Did not advance			
