= Cameroon at the 2022 World Athletics Championships =

Cameroon at the 2022 World Championships in Athletics
- WA code: CMR

in Eugene, US
- Competitors: ~~1~~
- Medals: Gold 0 Silver 0 Bronze 0 Total 0

World Championships in Athletics appearances
- 1987; 1991; 1993; 1995; 1997; 1999; 2001; 2003; 2005; 2007; 2009; 2011; 2013; 2015; 2017; 2019; 2022; 2023; 2025

Cameroon was set to compete at the 2022 World Championships in Athletics with one athlete, but could not due to the athlete not receiving a visa.

== Results ==
(q – qualified, DNS — did not start, NM – no mark, SB – season best)

=== Men ===
Track and road events

Athlete	Event	Heat		Semi-final		Final	
Athlete	Event	Result	Rank	Result	Rank	Result	Rank
Emmanuel Eseme	200 metres	DNS	For not receiving a US visa to participate	Did not advance			
