= Yemen at the 2024 World Aquatics Championships =

- Flag of Yemen
- FINA code: YEM
- National federation: Yemen Swimming & Aquatics Federation

in Doha, Qatar
- Competitors: 2 in 1 sport
- Medals: Gold 0 Silver 0 Bronze 0 Total 0

World Aquatics Championships appearances
- 2005; 2007; 2009; 2011; 2013; 2015; 2017; 2019; 2022; 2023; 2024

Yemen competed at the 2024 World Aquatics Championships in Doha, Qatar from 2 to 18 February.

== Competitors ==
The following is the list of competitors in the Championships.

Sport	Men	Women	Total
Swimming	2	0	2
Total	2	0	2

== Swimming ==
Yemen entered 2 swimmers.

Men

Athlete	Event	Heat		Semifinal		Final	
Athlete	Event	Time	Rank	Time	Rank	Time	Rank
Aseel Khousrof	50 metre freestyle	27.32	98	Did not advance			
Aseel Khousrof	100 metre freestyle	1:04.61	106	Did not advance			
Yusuf Nasser	50 metre butterfly	31.35	65	Did not advance			
Yusuf Nasser	100 metre butterfly	1:12.93	66	Did not advance			
