= The Gambia at the 2017 World Aquatics Championships =

- Flag of the Gambia
- FINA code: GAM
- National federation: Gambia Swimming and Aquatics Sports Association

in Budapest, Hungary
- Competitors: 2 in 1 sport
- Medals: Gold 0 Silver 0 Bronze 0 Total 0

World Aquatics Championships appearances
- 1973; 1975; 1978; 1982; 1986; 1991; 1994; 1998; 2001; 2003; 2005; 2007; 2009; 2011; 2013; 2015; 2017; 2019; 2022; 2023; 2024

The Gambia competed at the 2017 World Aquatics Championships in Budapest, Hungary from 14 July to 30 July.

== Swimming ==
The Gambia has received a Universality invitation from FINA to send two male swimmers to the World Championships.

| Athlete | Event | Heat | | Semifinal | | Final | |
| Athlete | Event | Time | Rank | Time | Rank | Time | Rank |
|---|---|---|---|---|---|---|---|
| Jegan Jobe | Men's 50 m breaststroke | DNS | | Did not advance | | | |
| Jegan Jobe | Men's 100 m breaststroke | DNS | | Did not advance | | | |
| Momodou Saine | Men's 100 m freestyle | DNS | | Did not advance | | | |
| Momodou Saine | Men's 50 m butterfly | DNS | | Did not advance | | | |
