= Cameroon at the 2015 World Championships in Athletics =

- WA code: CMR

in Beijing
- Competitors: 2
- Medals: Gold 0 Silver 0 Bronze 0 Total 0

World Championships in Athletics appearances
- 1987; 1991; 1993; 1995; 1997; 1999; 2001; 2003; 2005; 2007; 2009; 2011; 2013; 2015; 2017; 2019; 2022; 2023

Cameroon competed at the 2015 World Championships in Athletics in Beijing, China, from 22 to 30 August 2015.

== Results ==
=== Women ===
Field events

Athlete	Event	Qualification		Final	
Athlete	Event	Distance	Position	Distance	Position
Auriol Dongmo Mekemnang	Shot put	16.85 NR	20	Did not advance	
Joëlle Mbumi Nkouindjin	Triple jump	13.06	26	Did not advance	
