= Grace Manuela Nguelo'O =

Cameroonian swimmer

Personal information
- Nationality: Cameroonian

Sport
- Sport: Swimming

Grace Manuela Nguelo'O Mabeu, (born on November 8, 2005) is a swimmer of Cameroonian origin, specializing in the sprint events of freestyle and butterfly (50m). She represented Cameroon at the 2024 Summer Olympics.

== Biography ==
Grace Manuela Nguelo'O was born on November 8, 2005, in Cameroon. She achieved her first major national performance at the age of 18 during the national elite swimming championship, completing the 50-meter freestyle in 30.80 seconds, setting a national record. At the 2024 World Championships, she finished in 99th place in the women's 50 m freestyle.

In 2024, she competed at the World Aquatics Championships, finishing 99th in the women's 50-meter freestyle event. That same year, she represented Cameroon at the Summer Olympics, solidifying her presence on the world stage and becoming one of the few Cameroonian swimmers to reach that level.

== Records ==
- Cameroonian national record in the 50m freestyle at the 2024 national swimming championship
