= Cameroon Swimming and Life Saving Federation =

Governing body of swimming in Cameroon

CANA
- FINA affiliation: 1984
- CANA affiliation: xxxx
- President: Ali Mamouda

The Cameroon Swimming and Life Saving Federation (French: Federation Camerounaise de Natation et de Sauvetage), is the national governing body for the sport of swimming in Cameroon.
