= Cameroon at the 2009 World Championships in Athletics =

- WA code: CMR

in Berlin
- Competitors: 3 (1 man, 2 women)
- Medals: Gold 0 Silver 0 Bronze 0 Total 0

World Championships in Athletics appearances
- 1987; 1991; 1993; 1995; 1997; 1999; 2001; 2003; 2005; 2007; 2009; 2011; 2013; 2015; 2017; 2019; 2022; 2023

Cameroon competes at the 2009 World Championships in Athletics from 15–23 August in Berlin.

== Team selection ==
Track and road events

Event	Athletes	
Event	Men	Women
400 metre hurdles		Carole Kaboud Mebam

Field and combined events

Event	Athletes	
Event	Men	Women
Triple jump	Hugo Mamba-Schlick	Françoise Mbango Etone

== Results ==
=== Men ===
Field and combined events

Event	Athletes	Qualification		Final	
Event	Athletes	Result	Rank	Result	Rank
Triple jump	Hugo Mamba-Schlick	16.63 SB	21	did not advance	

=== Women ===
Track and road events

Event	Athletes	Heats		Semifinal		Final	
Event	Athletes	Result	Rank	Result	Rank	Result	Rank
400 m hurdles	Carole Kaboud Mebam	58.10	30	did not advance			

Field and combined events

Event	Athletes	Qualification		Final	
Event	Athletes	Result	Rank	Result	Rank
Triple jump	Françoise Mbango Etone	DNS	-	did not advance	
