= Norah Milanesi =

Cameroonian swimmer (born 2003)

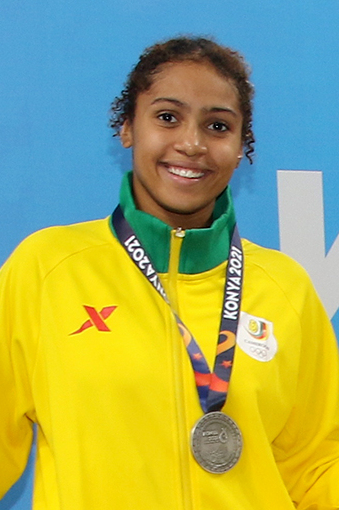

Personal information
- Full name: Norah Elisabeth Milanesi
- Nationality: Cameroonian
- Born: 23 January 2003 (age 23) Broni, Italy

Sport
- Sport: Swimming
- Strokes: freestyle
- Club: Campus Aquae
Medal record
Women's swimming
Representing Cameroon
Islamic Solidarity Games
Silver medal – second place	2021 Konya	100 m freestyle

Norah Elisabeth Milanesi (born 23 January 2003 in Broni, Italy) is a Cameroonian swimmer. She competed in the women's 50 metre freestyle at the 2020 Summer Olympics.

== Personal life ==
Milanesi was born in Italy, and is of Cameroonian and Italian descent.
