= Cameroon at the 2011 World Championships in Athletics =

- WA code: CMR
- National federation: Fédération Camerounaise d'Athlétisme

in Daegu
- Competitors: 2
- Medals: Gold 0 Silver 0 Bronze 0 Total 0

World Championships in Athletics appearances
- 1987; 1991; 1993; 1995; 1997; 1999; 2001; 2003; 2005; 2007; 2009; 2011; 2013; 2015; 2017; 2019; 2022; 2023

Cameroon competed at the 2011 World Championships in Athletics from August 27 to September 4 in Daegu, South Korea. A team of two athletes was announced to represent the country in the event.

== Results ==
=== Men ===
| Athlete | Event | Preliminaries | | Heats | | Semifinals | | Final | |
| Athlete | Event | Time Width Height | Rank | Time Width Height | Rank | Time Width Height | Rank | Time Width Height | Rank |
|---|---|---|---|---|---|---|---|---|---|
| Hugo Mamba-Schlick | Triple jump | 16.15 | 21 | | | | | Did not advance | |

=== Women ===
| Athlete | Event | Preliminaries | | Heats | | Semifinals | | Final | |
| Athlete | Event | Time Width Height | Rank | Time Width Height | Rank | Time Width Height | Rank | Time Width Height | Rank |
|---|---|---|---|---|---|---|---|---|---|
| Delphine Atangana | 100 metres | 11.57 Q | 1 | 11.55 | 34 | Did not advance | | | |
