= Adama Ouedraogo =

Burkinabé swimmer

Personal information
- Born: 3 April 1987 (age 39) Yopougon, Ivory Coast

Sport
- Sport: Swimming

Adama Ouédraogo (born 3 April 1987 in Yopougon, Côte d'Ivoire) is a Burkinabé swimmer who specializes in freestyle. He competed in the 50 m event at the 2012 Summer Olympics. In 2019, he represented Burkina Faso at the 2019 African Games held in Rabat, Morocco.

He competed in the men's 50m freestyle event at the 2020 Summer Olympics.
