= Tindwende Sawadogo =

Burkinabé swimmer

Tindwende Thierry Sawadogo
Personal information
- Nationality: Burkinabe
- Born: 22 July 1995 (age 29)
- Height: 2 m (6 ft 7 in)
- Weight: 107 kg (236 lb)

Sport
- Country: Burkina Faso
- Sport: Swimming

Tindwende Sawadogo (born 22 July 1995) is a Burkinabé Olympic swimmer. He represented his country at the 2016 Summer Olympics in the Men's 50 metre freestyle event where he ranked at #67 with a time of 26.38 seconds. He did not advance to the semifinals. In 2019, he represented Burkina Faso at the 2019 African Games held in Rabat, Morocco.
