= Ousman Jobe =

Gambian swimmer (born 2005)

Personal information
- Born: 27 November 2005 (age 20) Bakoteh, Banjul, Gambia

Sport
- Sport: Swimming

Ousman Jobe (born 27 November 2005) is a Gambian swimmer. He competed in the men's 50 metre freestyle event at the 2024 Summer Olympics, but didn't advance past the heats.
