= Burkinabé Swimming and Life Saving Federation =

Sports governing body in Burkina Faso

CANA
- Founded: 2000
- FINA affiliation: 2001
- CANA affiliation: xxxx
- President: Kabore Poussi

The Burkinabé Swimming and Life Saving Federation (French: Federation Burkinabe de Natation et de Sauvetage), is the national governing body for the sport of swimming in Burkina Faso.
