= Magnim Jordano Daou =

Togolese swimmer (born 2004)

Personal information
- Born: July 11, 2004 (age 21)

Sport
- Sport: Swimming

Magnim Jordano Daou (born 11 July 2004) is a Togolese swimmer. He competed in the men's 50 metre freestyle event at the 2024 Summer Olympics, but didn't advance past the heats.
