= Souleymane Napare =

Burkinabé swimmer

Personal information
- Born: March 31, 2003 (age 23)

Sport
- Sport: Swimming

Souleymane Napare (born 31 March 2003) is a Burkinabé swimmer. He competed in the men's 50 metre freestyle event at the 2024 Summer Olympics, but didn't advance past the heats.
