= Angelika Ouedraogo =

Burkinabé swimmer

Personal information
- Full name: Angelika Sita Ouédraogo
- Born: December 4, 1993 (age 32) Ouagadougou, Burkina Faso

Sport
- Sport: Swimming

Angelika Sita Ouédraogo (born 4 December 1993) is a Burkinabé swimmer. She competed in the 50 m freestyle event at the 2012 Summer Olympics where she ranked 63rd and did not advance to the semifinals.

Ouedraogo competed in the 50 m freestyle event at the 2016 Summer Olympics where she ranked 67th and did not advance to the semifinals. She was flag bearer for her country during the closing ceremony.

In 2019, she represented Burkina Faso at the 2019 World Aquatics Championships held in Gwangju, South Korea. She competed in the women's 50 metre freestyle event. She did not advance to compete in the semi-finals.

Ouedraogo competed in the 50 m Freestyle again at the 2020 Summer Olympics where she placed 58th overall and did not advance to the semifinals.

Olympic Games
Preceded by Rachid Sidibé	Flagbearer for Burkina Faso; Tokyo 2020 with Hugues Fabrice Zango	Succeeded by Marthe Koala; Hugues Fabrice Zango
