= Charly Ndjoume =

Cameroonian swimmer (born 1986)

Personal information
- Nationality: Cameroonian
- Born: 11 November 1986 (age 39) Melong, Cameroon

Sport
- Sport: Swimming

Charly Ndjoume (born 11 November 1986) is a Cameroonian swimmer. He competed in the men's 50 metre freestyle at the 2020 Summer Olympics.
