= Flag of Burkina Faso =

Burkina Faso
- Use: National flag
- Proportion: 2:3
- Adopted: August 4, 1984; 42 years ago
- Design: Two horizontal bands of red and green with a yellow five-pointed star in the center.
- Designed by: Ferdinand Dabiré

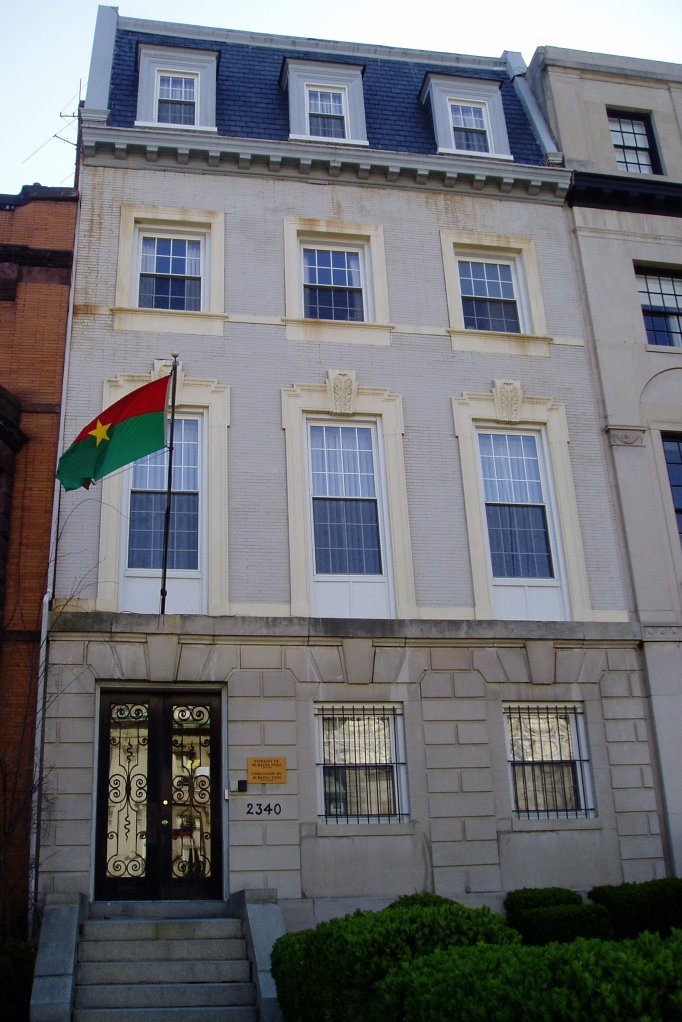
National flag at the embassy of Burkina Faso in Washington, DC

The national flag of Burkina Faso (French: drapeau du Burkina Faso) is formed by two equal horizontal bands of red (top) and green, with a yellow five-pointed star resting in the center. The flag was adopted on 4 August 1984. The flag uses the Pan-African colours of Ethiopia, reflecting both a break with the country's colonial past and its unity with other African ex-colonies. The red is also said to symbolize the revolution and the green the abundance of agricultural and natural riches. The yellow star placed over the red and green stripes represents the guiding light of the revolution. The flag was adopted following the coup of 1983 which brought Thomas Sankara to power.

== History ==
The original flag of Upper Volta, adopted at independence, contained three horizontal stripes of black, white, and red. These colours represented the three major tributaries of the Volta River, which flows south through the country: the Black Volta, the White Volta and the Red Volta. It is virtually identical to the tricolor flag used by the German Empire from 1871 to 1918. The flag was changed when Upper Volta became Burkina Faso on 4 August 1984.

== Construction sheet ==
flag construction sheet

== Colour scheme ==
The exact color shades are not defined by law, but are listed as "green", "red" and "yellow-gold" in the constitution. Approximations are listed below:

Burkina Faso	Red	Yellow	Green
Pantone	179c	115c	7739c
CMYK	0-82-81-6	2-17-91-0	100-0-54-38
RGB	239-43-45	252-209-22	0-158-73
Hexadecimal	#EF2B2D	#FCD116	#009E49

== Historical flags ==
Flag	Years of use	Ratio	Government	Description
	1904–1919	2:3	As part of Upper Senegal and Niger	The French tricolor was used as the official flag of French Upper Volta.
	1919–1932	2:3	French Upper Volta	The French tricolor was used as the official flag of French Upper Volta.
	1932–1947	2:3	As part of French Sudan, the Ivory Coast, and the Colony of Niger	The French tricolor was used as the official flag of French Upper Volta.
	1947–1958	2:3	French Upper Volta	The French tricolor was used as the official flag of French Upper Volta.
	1958–1960	2:3	Republic of Upper Volta	The French tricolor was used as the official flag of French Upper Volta.
	1960–1984	2:3	Republic of Upper Volta	The national flag of the Republic of Upper Volta was introduced upon gaining independence from France on 5 August 1960. It consisted of three equal horizontal bands of black, white, and red. It was almost identical to the flag of the German Empire (with the only difference being a slightly duller shade of red).
	1984–Present	2:3	Burkina Faso	The current flag, consisting of two horizontal bands of red and green with a yellow five-pointed star in the center, was adopted on 4 August 1984.

== Other flags ==
Presidential standard of Burkina Faso

Historical presidential standard of Upper Volta (1959–1984)

Roundel of the Air Force of Burkina Faso

Roundel of the Air Force of Burkina Faso (variant)

Historical roundel of the Air Force of Upper Volta (1964–1984)

Historical roundel of the Air Force of Upper Volta (1964–1984; variant)

== Gallery ==
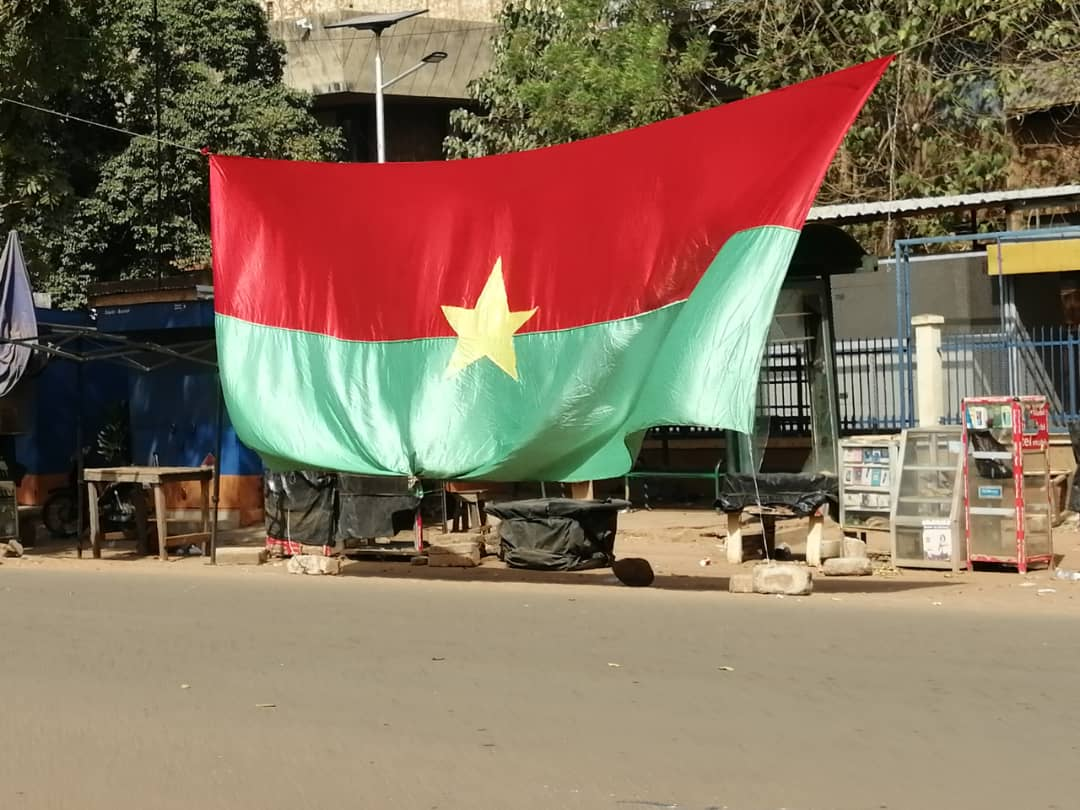
Burkinabé flag hanging on the side of a road in Ouagadougou (2022)

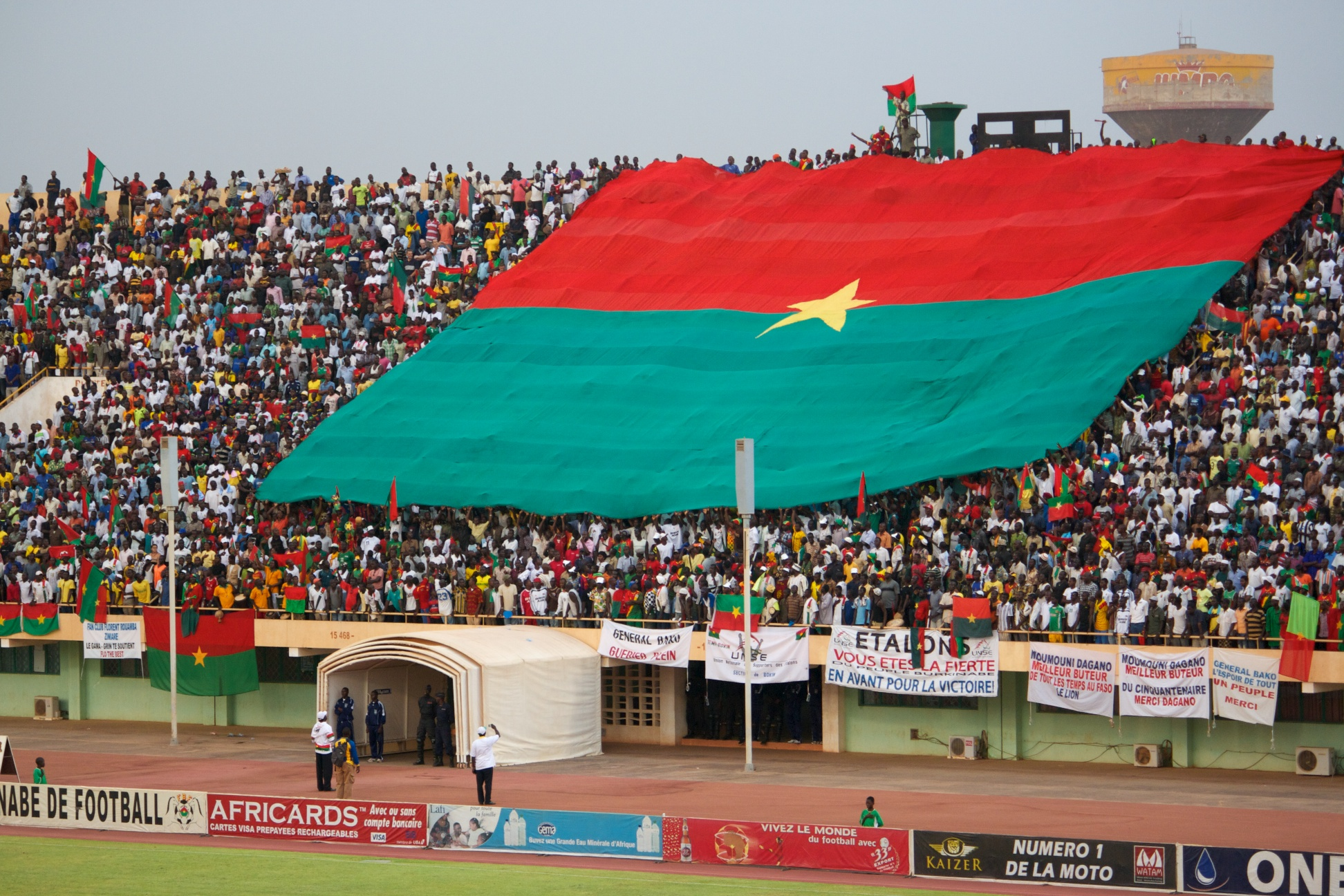
Large Burkinabè flag flown at an Africa Cup of Nations qualifying match between Burkina Faso and Namibia (2011)

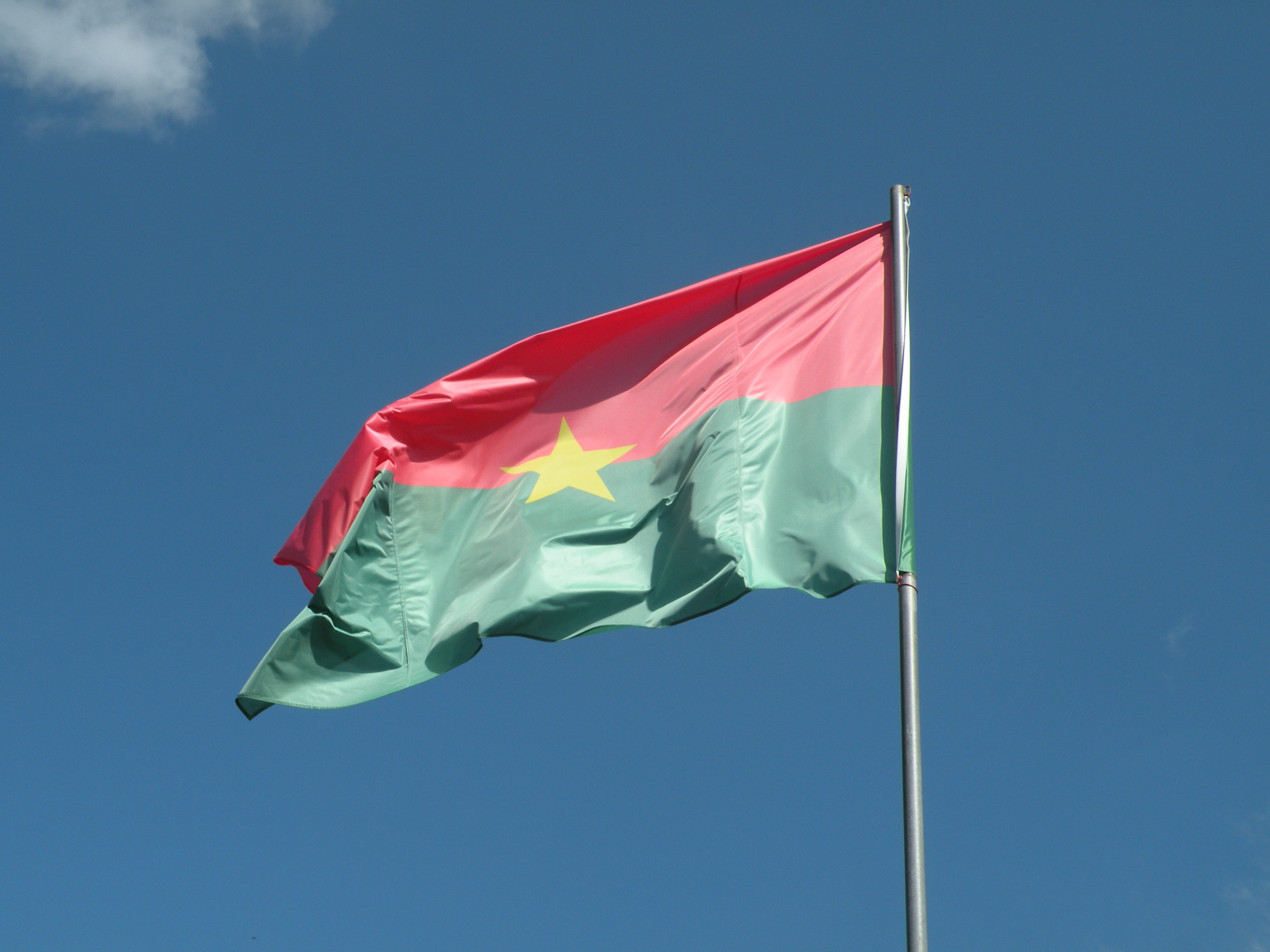
Burkinabè flag flown in La Gacilly, France (2009)

== See also ==
- Coat of arms of Burkina Faso
- Pan-African colours
