= Flag of Cameroon =

Republic of Cameroon
- Use: National flag and ensign
- Proportion: 2:3
- Adopted: 26 October 1957; 69 years ago (original tricolor design); 20 May 1975; 51 years ago (current design)
- Design: A vertical tricolour of green, red and yellow, with a gold star centred on the red band.

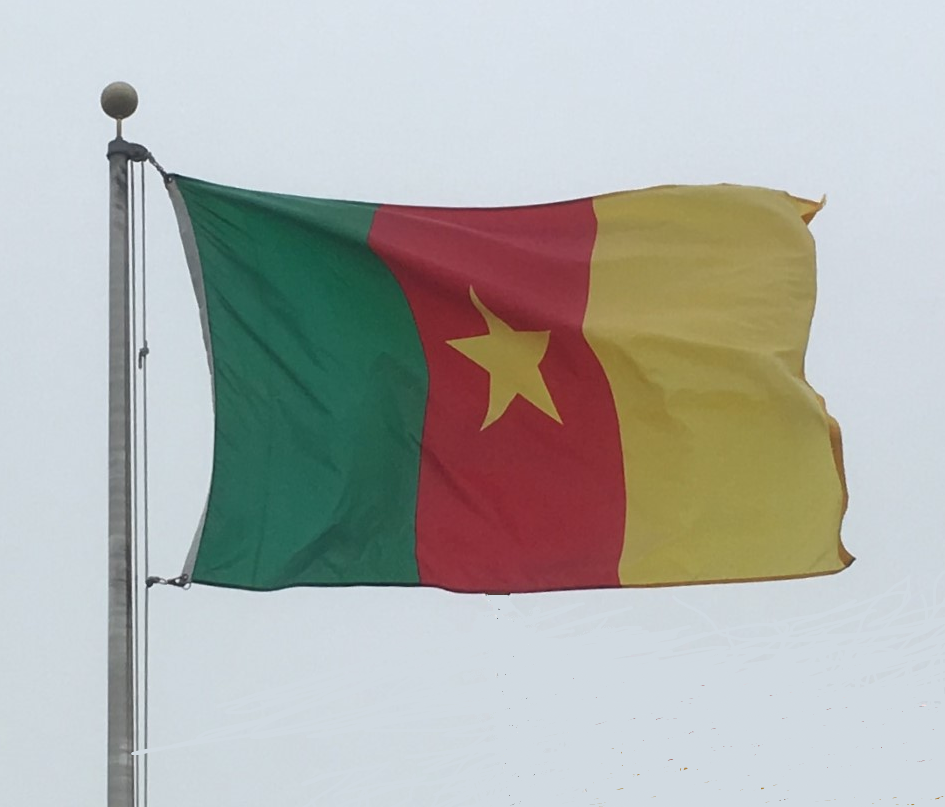
The flag of Cameroon on a flagpole

The national flag of Cameroon (drapeau national du Cameroun) is a vertical tricolour of green, red and yellow pales, with one yellow five-pointed star in its center. This flag was originally adopted on 26 October 1957 as a plain tricolor then gained its present form on 20 May 1975 after Cameroon became a unitary state. There is a wide variation in the size of the central star, although it is always contained within the inside stripe.

== Description ==
The colour scheme uses the traditional pan-African colours (Cameroon was the second state to adopt them). The centre stripe is thought to stand for unity: red is the colour of unity, and the star is referred to as "the star of unity". The yellow stands for the sun, and also the savannas in the northern part of the country, while the green is for the forests in the southern part of Cameroon.

The previous flag of Cameroon, used from 1961 to 1975, had a similar colour scheme, but with two gold (darker than the third stripe by comparison) stars in the upper half of the green. It was adopted after British Southern Cameroons joined with Republic of Cameroon to create the Federal Republic of Cameroon. The two stars represented the two components of the federation, East Cameroon and West Cameroon.

The original flag of the State of Cameroon and the Republic of Cameroon, made law by Law No. 46 of 26 October 1957, was the simple tricolour. It was confirmed on 21 February 1960 in the new constitution.

== Military flags and ensigns ==
Military flags and ensigns of Cameroon are following British practice with different designs.

== Colors ==
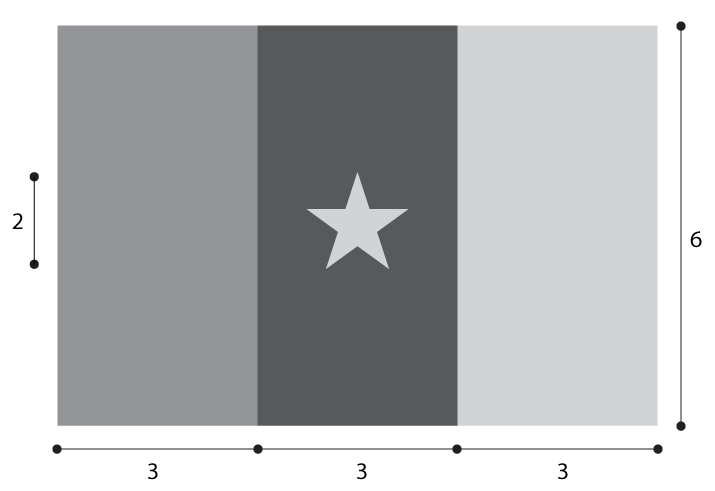
black and white construction sheet
	Green	Red	Yellow
HEX	#007a5e	#ce1126	#fcd116

== Historical flags ==
=== Colonial-era ===
Flag of the German Colonial Office

Proposed flag of German Cameroon

Flag of French Cameroon (1916–1960)

Flag of British Cameroons (1922–1961)

Flag of the State of Cameroon (1957–1960).

=== Post-independence ===
Flag of the Republic of Cameroon (1960–1961).

Flag of the Federal Republic of Cameroon (1961–1975)

== Similar colours ==
The flag of Cameroon uses the Pan-African colors that is used by many African countries in the region, most notably with similar designs in the flags of Senegal, Guinea and Mali.

== See also ==
- Coat of arms of Cameroon
- List of Cameroonian flags
