= Swimming at the 2013 World Aquatics Championships – Men's 200 metre butterfly =

Men's 200 metre butterfly at the 2013 World Aquatics Championships
- Venue: Palau Sant Jordi
- Dates: July 30, 2013 (heats & semifinals); July 31, 2013 (final)
- Competitors: 34 from 30 nations
- Winning time: 1:54.32

Medalists
gold medal	Chad le Clos	South Africa
silver medal	Paweł Korzeniowski	Poland
bronze medal	Wu Peng	China

Barcelona Palau San Jordi

The men's 200 metre butterfly event in swimming at the 2013 World Aquatics Championships took place on 30–31 July at the Palau Sant Jordi in Barcelona, Spain.

== Records ==
Prior to this competition, the existing world and championship records were:

World record	Michael Phelps (USA)	1:51.51	Rome, Italy	29 July 2009
Competition record	Michael Phelps (USA)	1:51.51	Rome, Italy	29 July 2009

== Results ==
=== Heats ===
The heats were held at 10:38.

Rank	Heat	Lane	Name	Nationality	Time	Notes
1	3	5	Tyler Clary	United States	1:56.03	Q
2	4	4	Chad le Clos	South Africa	1:56.21	Q
3	3	6	Tom Luchsinger	United States	1:56.32	Q
4	2	6	Nikolay Skvortsov	Russia	1:56.47	Q
5	4	5	Chen Yin	China	1:56.48	Q
6	4	7	Leonardo de Deus	Brazil	1:56.52	Q
7	4	3	Paweł Korzeniowski	Poland	1:56.61	Q
8	4	6	Yuki Kobori	Japan	1:56.64	Q
9	2	3	Bence Biczó	Hungary	1:56.70	Q
10	2	4	Wu Peng	China	1:56.96	Q
11	3	4	Takeshi Matsuda	Japan	1:57.14	Q
12	3	3	Grant Irvine	Australia	1:57.18	Q
13	2	2	Jordan Coelho	France	1:57.19	Q
14	2	7	Joseph Schooling	Singapore	1:57.23	Q
15	2	5	Velimir Stjepanović	Serbia	1:57.34	Q
16	3	7	Roberto Pavoni	Great Britain	1:57.37	Q
17	4	0	Alexandru Coci	Romania	1:57.86	
18	4	1	Zackariah Chetrat	Canada	1:57.92	
19	3	8	Mauricio Fiol	Peru	1:58.29	NR
20	3	2	Michal Poprawa	Poland	1:58.34	
21	4	2	Francesco Pavone	Italy	1:58.68	
22	2	8	Marcos Lavado	Venezuela	1:58.69	
23	3	1	Pedro Oliveira	Portugal	1:58.78	
24	2	1	Shaun Burnett	New Zealand	1:59.35	
25	2	0	Gal Nevo	Israel	1:59.37	
26	2	9	Yury Suvorau	Belarus	2:01.28	
27	1	5	Esteban Enderica	Ecuador	2:01.46	NR
28	3	0	Hsu Chi-chieh	Chinese Taipei	2:01.49	
29	1	4	Ramiro Ramírez	Mexico	2:02.37	
30	4	9	Jan Šefl	Czech Republic	2:02.43	
31	4	8	Chang Gyu-Cheol	South Korea	2:03.32	
32	3	9	Yousef Al-Askari	Kuwait	2:07.03	
33	1	6	Khalid Baba	Bahrain	2:20.23	
34	1	2	Andrianirina Lalanomena	Madagascar	2:33.87	
	1	3	Nuno Miguel Rola	Angola		DNS

=== Semifinals ===
The semifinals were held at 19:35.

==== Semifinal 1 ====
Rank	Lane	Name	Nationality	Time	Notes
1	4	Chad le Clos	South Africa	1:55.33	Q
2	2	Wu Peng	China	1:55.42	Q
3	5	Nikolay Skvortsov	Russia	1:56.02	Q
4	3	Leonardo de Deus	Brazil	1:56.06	Q
5	6	Yuki Kobori	Japan	1:56.15	
6	1	Joseph Schooling	Singapore	1:56.27	
7	7	Grant Irvine	Australia	1:56.95	
8	8	Roberto Pavoni	Great Britain	1:57.60	

==== Semifinal 2 ====
Rank	Lane	Name	Nationality	Time	Notes
1	6	Paweł Korzeniowski	Poland	1:55.67	Q
2	3	Chen Yin	China	1:55.97	Q
2	4	Tyler Clary	United States	1:55.97	Q
4	5	Tom Luchsinger	United States	1:56.10	Q
5	7	Takeshi Matsuda	Japan	1:56.42	
6	2	Bence Biczó	Hungary	1:56.48	
7	8	Velimir Stjepanović	Serbia	1:56.60	
8	1	Jordan Coelho	France	1:57.12	

=== Final ===
The final was held at 18:23.

Rank	Lane	Name	Nationality	Time	Notes
1st place, gold medalist(s)	4	Chad le Clos	South Africa	1:54.32	
2nd place, silver medalist(s)	3	Paweł Korzeniowski	Poland	1:55.01	
3rd place, bronze medalist(s)	5	Wu Peng	China	1:55.09	
4	6	Chen Yin	China	1:55.47	
5	8	Tom Luchsinger	United States	1:55.70	
6	7	Nikolay Skvortsov	Russia	1:56.02	
7	2	Tyler Clary	United States	1:56.34	
8	1	Leonardo de Deus	Brazil	1:56.44	
