= Swimming at the 2013 World Aquatics Championships – Men's 100 metre breaststroke =

Men's 100 metre breaststroke at the 2013 World Aquatics Championships
- Venue: Palau Sant Jordi
- Dates: July 28, 2013 (heats & semifinals); July 29, 2013 (final)
- Competitors: 77 from 68 nations
- Winning time: 58.79

Medalists
gold medal	Christian Sprenger	Australia
silver medal	Cameron van der Burgh	South Africa
bronze medal	Felipe Lima	Brazil

Barcelona Palau San Jordi

The men's 100 metre breaststroke event in swimming at the 2013 World Aquatics Championships took place on 28–29 July at the Palau Sant Jordi in Barcelona, Spain.

== Records ==
Prior to this competition, the existing world and championship records were:

World record	Cameron van der Burgh (RSA)	58.46	London, Great Britain	29 July 2012
Competition record	Brenton Rickard (AUS)	58.58	Rome, Italy	27 July 2009

== Results ==
=== Heats ===
The heats were held at 11:47.

Rank	Heat	Lane	Name	Nationality	Time	Notes
1	7	4	Christian Sprenger	Australia	59.53	Q
2	8	2	Kirill Strelnikov	Russia	59.80	Q
3	6	4	Fabio Scozzoli	Italy	59.88	Q
3	7	5	Kosuke Kitajima	Japan	59.88	Q
5	8	3	Glenn Snyders	New Zealand	59.92	Q
6	8	6	Kevin Cordes	United States	1:00.01	Q
7	8	4	Cameron van der Burgh	South Africa	1:00.02	Q
8	6	6	Felipe Lima	Brazil	1:00.06	Q
9	7	3	Ross Murdoch	Great Britain	1:00.08	Q
9	8	7	Hendrik Feldwehr	Germany	1:00.08	Q
11	7	6	Michael Jamieson	Great Britain	1:00.20	Q
12	6	2	Nicolas Fink	United States	1:00.24	Q
12	7	2	João Luiz Gomes Júnior	Brazil	1:00.24	Q
14	7	7	Mattia Pesce	Italy	1:00.32	Q
15	6	1	Damir Dugonjič	Slovenia	1:00.36	Q
16	6	5	Giedrius Titenis	Lithuania	1:00.44	Q
17	8	5	Brenton Rickard	Australia	1:00.52	
18	6	0	Dawid Szulich	Poland	1:00.54	NR
19	6	7	Giacomo Perez d'Ortona	France	1:00.55	
20	6	3	Akihiro Yamaguchi	Japan	1:00.69	
21	6	9	Laurent Carnol	Luxembourg	1:00.76	
22	7	8	Richard Funk	Canada	1:00.89	
23	8	8	Johannes Skagius	Sweden	1:00.94	NR
24	7	9	Carlos Almeida	Portugal	1:01.01	NR
25	8	9	Gu Biaorong	China	1:01.08	
26	5	3	Jorge Murillo	Colombia	1:01.28	
27	6	8	Tomáš Klobučník	Slovakia	1:01.37	
28	7	1	Vyacheslav Sinkevich	Russia	1:01.38	
28	8	1	Christian vom Lehn	Germany	1:01.38	
30	7	0	Panagiotis Samilidis	Greece	1:01.48	
31	4	7	Dmitriy Balandin	Kazakhstan	1:01.58	
32	4	6	Martin Schweizer	Switzerland	1:01.64	
33	5	4	Ihor Borysyk	Ukraine	1:01.71	
34	5	0	Imri Ganiel	Israel	1:01.77	
34	5	7	Eetu Karvonen	Finland	1:01.77	
36	5	2	Čaba Silađi	Serbia	1:01.78	
37	8	0	Édgar Crespo	Panama	1:01.95	
38	5	8	Demir Atasoy	Turkey	1:02.01	NR
39	5	6	Viktar Vabishchevich	Belarus	1:02.08	NR
40	5	5	Martin Liivamägi	Estonia	1:02.41	
41	4	1	Miguel Ferreira	Venezuela	1:02.45	
42	4	3	David Oliver Mercado	Mexico	1:02.57	
43	5	1	Choi Kyu-Woong	South Korea	1:02.58	
44	4	2	Sandeep Sejwal	India	1:02.69	
45	5	9	Joshua Hall	Philippines	1:02.87	NR
46	4	8	Radomyos Matjiur	Thailand	1:03.27	
47	3	6	Nikolajs Maskalenko	Latvia	1:03.28	
48	3	4	Malick Fall	Senegal	1:03.38	
49	3	3	Abraham McLeod	Trinidad and Tobago	1:03.47	
50	4	9	Abdulrahman Al-Bader	Kuwait	1:03.72	NR
51	4	0	Vladislav Mustafin	Uzbekistan	1:03.76	
52	3	7	Eladio Carrión	Puerto Rico	1:04.40	
53	3	2	Wong Chun Yan	Hong Kong	1:04.96	
54	3	1	James Lawson	Zimbabwe	1:05.12	
55	3	9	Jesús Flores	Honduras	1:05.32	
56	2	1	Benjamin Schulte	Guam	1:05.67	
57	2	4	José Montoya	Costa Rica	1:05.89	
58	4	4	Martin Melconian	Uruguay	1:05.90	
58	4	5	Petr Bartůněk	Czech Republic	1:05.90	
60	3	5	Mubarak Al-Besher	United Arab Emirates	1:06.17	
61	3	0	Rafael van Leeuwaarde	Suriname	1:06.22	
62	3	8	Vasilii Danilov	Kyrgyzstan	1:06.51	
63	2	5	Wael Koubrousli	Lebanon	1:06.54	
64	2	6	Bradford Worrell	Saint Lucia	1:07.47	NR
65	2	3	Serginni Marten	Netherlands Antilles	1:08.23	
66	2	0	Douglas Miller	Fiji	1:09.19	NR
67	1	4	Pierre-Andre Adam	Seychelles	1:09.77	
68	2	2	Muhammad Isa Ahmad	Brunei	1:09.96	
69	1	5	Troy Kojenlang	Marshall Islands	1:10.42	
70	2	9	Alexandros Axiotis	Zambia	1:10.73	
71	2	8	Gunsennorov Zandanbal	Mongolia	1:11.27	
72	2	7	J'Air Smith	Antigua and Barbuda	1:14.70	
73	1	6	Mohamed Cheic Camara	Guinea	1:15.54	
74	1	3	Lin Tin Kyaw	Myanmar	1:18.24	
75	1	2	Storm Hablich	Saint Vincent and the Grenadines	1:24.08	
76	1	7	Yokubdzhon Umarov	Tajikistan	1:25.50	
77	1	1	Awoussou Ablam Hodadje	Benin	1:32.77	

=== Semifinals ===
The semifinals were held at 19:06.

==== Semifinal 1 ====
Rank	Lane	Name	Nationality	Time	Notes
1	3	Kevin Cordes	United States	59.78	Q
2	6	Felipe Lima	Brazil	59.84	Q
3	5	Kosuke Kitajima	Japan	59.92	Q
4	4	Kirill Strelnikov	Russia	59.94	
5	2	Hendrik Feldwehr	Germany	1:00.05	
6	8	Giedrius Titenis	Lithuania	1:00.14	
7	7	Michael Jamieson	Great Britain	1:00.59	
8	1	Mattia Pesce	Italy	1:01.06	

==== Semifinal 2 ====
Rank	Lane	Name	Nationality	Time	Notes
1	4	Christian Sprenger	Australia	59.23	Q
2	6	Cameron van der Burgh	South Africa	59.78	Q
3	8	Damir Dugonjič	Slovenia	59.80	Q
4	7	Nicolas Fink	United States	59.84	Q
5	5	Fabio Scozzoli	Italy	59.90	Q
6	2	Ross Murdoch	Great Britain	1:00.07	
7	3	Glenn Snyders	New Zealand	1:00.22	
8	1	João Luiz Gomes Júnior	Brazil	1:00.40	

=== Final ===
The final was held at 18:02.

Rank	Lane	Name	Nationality	Time	Notes
1st place, gold medalist(s)	4	Christian Sprenger	Australia	58.79	
2nd place, silver medalist(s)	3	Cameron van der Burgh	South Africa	58.97	
3rd place, bronze medalist(s)	2	Felipe Lima	Brazil	59.65	
4	6	Damir Dugonjič	Slovenia	59.68	
5	1	Fabio Scozzoli	Italy	59.70	
6	8	Kosuke Kitajima	Japan	59.98	
7	5	Kevin Cordes	United States	1:00.02	
8	7	Nicolas Fink	United States	1:00.10	
