= Swimming at the 2013 World Aquatics Championships – Men's 4 × 100 metre medley relay =

Men's 4 × 100 metre medley relay at the 2013 World Aquatics Championships
- Venue: Palau Sant Jordi
- Dates: August 4, 2013 (heats & final)
- Competitors: 92 from 23 nations
- Winning time: 3:31.51

Medalists
gold medal	Camille Lacourt; Giacomo Perez d'Ortona; Jérémy Stravius; Fabien Gilot	France
silver medal	Ashley Delaney; Christian Sprenger; Tommaso D'Orsogna; James Magnussen	Australia
bronze medal	Ryosuke Irie; Kosuke Kitajima; Takuro Fujii; Shinri Shioura	Japan

Barcelona Palau San Jordi

The men's 4 × 100 metre medley relay event in swimming at the 2013 World Aquatics Championships took place on 4 August at the Palau Sant Jordi in Barcelona, Spain.

== Records ==
Prior to this competition, the existing world and championship records were:

World record	United States (USA); Aaron Peirsol (52.19); Eric Shanteau (58.57); Michael Phelps (49.72); David Walters (46.80)	3:27.28	Rome, Italy	2 August 2009
Competition record	United States (USA); Aaron Peirsol (52.19); Eric Shanteau (58.57); Michael Phelps (49.72); David Walters (46.80)	3:27.28	Rome, Italy	2 August 2009

== Results ==
=== Heats ===
The heats were held at 10:51.

Rank	Heat	Lane	Name	Nationality	Time	Notes
1	3	4	David Plummer (53.22); Nicolas Fink (1:00.17); Eugene Godsoe (51.59); Jimmy Feigen (47.74)	United States	3:32.72	Q
2	3	5	Ashley Delaney (53.85); Christian Sprenger (59.17); Kenneth To (52.37); Cameron McEvoy (47.85)	Australia	3:33.64	Q
2	3	6	Vladimir Morozov (54.67); Kirill Strelnikov (59.84); Nikolay Skvortsov (51.43); Nikita Lobintsev (47.70)	Russia	3:33.64	Q
4	2	3	Camille Lacourt (54.02); Giacomo Perez d'Ortona (59.95); Jérémy Stravius (51.96); Fabien Gilot (48.11)	France	3:34.04	Q
5	2	4	Ryosuke Irie (53.67); Kosuke Kitajima (1:00.10); Takuro Fujii (52.18); Shinri Shioura (48.30)	Japan	3:34.25	Q
6	1	6	Mirco di Tora (54.99); Fabio Scozzoli (59.63); Matteo Rivolta (51.60); Marco Orsi (48.07)	Italy	3:34.29	Q
7	2	5	László Cseh (54.19); Dániel Gyurta (59.50); Bence Pulai (52.12); Krisztián Takács (48.83)	Hungary	3:34.64	Q
8	1	5	Felix Wolf (55.12); Hendrik Feldwehr (59.56); Steffen Deibler (51.58); Dimitri Colupaev (48.65)	Germany	3:34.91	Q
9	1	4	Chris Walker-Hebborn (54.33); Ross Murdoch (1:00.13); Michael Rock (52.32); Adam Brown (48.45)	Great Britain	3:35.23	
10	1	3	Xu Jiayu (53.69); Gu Biaorong (1:00.92); Wu Peng (52.31); Lü Zhiwu (49.03)	China	3:35.95	
11	2	6	Darren Murray (55.17); Cameron van der Burgh (1:00.47); Chad le Clos (51.88); Leith Shankland (48.70)	South Africa	3:36.22	
12	3	2	Leonardo de Deus (54.96); Felipe Lima (59.32); Nicholas Santos (53.70); Marcelo Chierighini (48.33)	Brazil	3:36.31	
13	2	1	Danas Rapšys (55.57); Giedrius Titenis (59.44); Tadas Duškinas (52.95); Mindaugas Sadauskas (48.76)	Lithuania	3:36.72	
14	3	3	Gareth Kean (54.08); Glenn Snyders (59.19); Shaun Burnett (55.20); Matthew Stanley (49.23)	New Zealand	3:37.70	
15	3	7	Charles Francis (55.21); Richard Funk (1:00.88); Coleman Allen (52.04); Luke Peddie (50.63))	Canada	3:38.76	
16	1	2	Jonatan Kopelev (54.91); Imri Ganiel (1:01.72); Yakov-Yan Toumarkin (53.61); Nimrod Shapira Bar-Or (49.07)	Israel	3:39.31	
17	2	7	Pavel Sankovich (55.85); Viktar Vabishchevich (1:02.03); Yauhen Tsurkin (51.74); Ihar Boki (51.13)	Belarus	3:40.75	
18	1	7	Martin Baďura (55.93); Petr Bartůněk (1:02.24); Martin Žikmund (54.64); Martin Verner (48.68)	Czech Republic	3:41.49	
19	2	8	Guven Duvan (56.95); Demir Atasoy (1:01.15); İskender Baslakov (55.35); Doğa Çelik (50.26)	Turkey	3:43.71	
20	3	8	Shin Hee-Woong (55.96); Choi Kyu-Woong (1:01.95); Chang Gyu-Cheol (53.79); Yang Jung-Doo (52.38)	South Korea	3:44.08	
21	1	1	Ezequiel Trujillo (58.25); David Oliver Mercado (1:02.16); Ramiro Ramírez (55.30); Alejandro Escudero (49.68)	Mexico	3:45.39	
22	3	1	Mohamed Khaled (56.81); Mohamed Gadallah (1:05.08); Marwan Adel (54.00); Marwan Ismail (50.42)	Egypt	3:46.31	NR
	2	2	Radosław Kawęcki (54.20); Dawid Szulich (1:00.21); Paweł Korzeniowski; Konrad Czerniak	Poland		DSQ

=== Final ===
The final was held at 19:31.

Rank	Lane	Name	Nationality	Time	Notes
1st place, gold medalist(s)	6	Camille Lacourt (53.23); Giacomo Perez d'Ortona (59.56); Jérémy Stravius (51.33); Fabien Gilot (47.39)	France	3:31.51	
2nd place, silver medalist(s)	5	Ashley Delaney (53.55); Christian Sprenger (58.47); Tommaso D'Orsogna (52.34); James Magnussen (47.28)	Australia	3:31.64	
3rd place, bronze medalist(s)	2	Ryosuke Irie (53.48); Kosuke Kitajima (59.29); Takuro Fujii (51.67); Shinri Shioura (47.82)	Japan	3:32.26	
4	3	Vladimir Morozov (53.99); Kirill Strelnikov (59.24); Yevgeny Korotyshkin (51.48); Andrey Grechin (48.03)	Russia	3:32.74	
5	8	Felix Wolf (55.04); Hendrik Feldwehr (58.94); Philip Heintz (51.90); Steffen Deibler (48.09)	Germany	3:33.97	
6	7	Mirco di Tora (55.03); Fabio Scozzoli (58.79); Matteo Rivolta (51.87); Marco Orsi (48.37)	Italy	3:34.06	
7	1	László Cseh (54.07); Dániel Gyurta (59.14); Bence Pulai (52.06); Krisztián Takács (48.82)	Hungary	3:34.09	
	4	Matt Grevers (53.02); Kevin Cordes (DSQ (~~59.34~~)); Ryan Lochte (51.01); Nathan Adrian (46.69)	United States	~~3:30.06~~	DSQ
