= United States at the 2013 World Aquatics Championships =

- Flag of the United States
- World Aquatics code: USA
- National federation: United States Aquatic Sports
- Website: www.usaquaticsports.org

in Barcelona, Spain
- Medals Ranked 1st: Gold 15 Silver 10 Bronze 9 Total 34

World Aquatics Championships appearances
- 1973; 1975; 1978; 1982; 1986; 1991; 1994; 1998; 2001; 2003; 2005; 2007; 2009; 2011; 2013; 2015; 2017; 2019; 2022; 2023; 2024; 2025

The United States competed at the 2013 World Aquatics Championships in Barcelona, Spain between July 19 and August 4, 2013.

== Medalists ==
Medal	Name	Sport	Event	Date
Gold	Haley Anderson	Open water swimming	Women's 5 km	20 July
Gold	Katie Ledecky	Swimming	Women's 400 m freestyle	28 July
Gold	Natalie Coughlin; Missy Franklin; Megan Romano; Shannon Vreeland; Simone Manuel*	Swimming	Women's 4×100 m freestyle relay	28 July
Gold	Cesilie Carlton	High diving	Women's high diving	30 July
Gold	Missy Franklin	Swimming	Women's 100 m backstroke	30 July
Gold	Katie Ledecky	Swimming	Women's 1500 m freestyle	30 July
Gold	Matt Grevers	Swimming	Men's 100 m backstroke	30 July
Gold	Missy Franklin	Swimming	Women's 200 m freestyle	31 July
Gold	Karlee Bispo; Missy Franklin; Katie Ledecky; Shannon Vreeland; Chelsea Chenault*; Madeline Dirado*; Jordan Mattern*	Swimming	Women's 4×200 m freestyle relay	1 August
Gold	Ryan Lochte	Swimming	Men's 200 m individual medley	1 August
Gold	Ryan Lochte	Swimming	Men's 200 m backstroke	2 August
Gold	Ricky Berens; Conor Dwyer; Charlie Houchin; Michael Klueh*; Matt McLean*; Ryan Lochte	Swimming	Men's 4×200 m freestyle relay	2 August
Gold	Missy Franklin	Swimming	Women's 200 m backstroke	3 August
Gold	Katie Ledecky	Swimming	Women's 800 m freestyle	3 August
Gold	Claire Donahue*; Missy Franklin; Jessica Hardy; Breeja Larson*; Elizabeth Pelton*; Megan Romano; Dana Vollmer; Shannon Vreeland*	Swimming	Women's 4×100 m medley relay	4 August
Silver	David Boudia	Diving	Men's 10 m platform	28 July
Silver	Nathan Adrian; Anthony Ervin; Jimmy Feigen; Ryan Lochte; Ricky Berens*; Conor Dwyer*	Swimming	Men's 4×100 m freestyle relay	28 July
Silver	Eugene Godsoe	Swimming	Men's 50 m butterfly	29 July
Silver	Ginger Huber	High diving	Women's high diving	30 July
Silver	Conor Dwyer	Swimming	Men's 200 m freestyle	30 July
Silver	David Plummer	Swimming	Men's 100 m backstroke	30 July
Silver	Michael McBroom	Swimming	Men's 800 m freestyle	31 July
Silver	Jimmy Feigen	Swimming	Men's 100 m freestyle	1 August
Silver	Matt Grevers	Swimming	Men's 50 m backstroke	4 August
Silver	Chase Kalisz	Swimming	Men's 400 m individual medley	4 August
Bronze	Eva Fabian	Open water swimming	Women's 25 km	27 July
Bronze	Connor Jaeger	Swimming	Men's 400 m freestyle	28 July
Bronze	Dana Vollmer	Swimming	Women's 100 m butterfly	29 July
Bronze	Jessica Hardy	Swimming	Women's 100 m breaststroke	30 July
Bronze	Nathan Adrian	Swimming	Men's 100 m freestyle	1 August
Bronze	Tyler Clary	Swimming	Men's 200 m backstroke	2 August
Bronze	Micah Lawrence	Swimming	Women's 200 m breaststroke	2 August
Bronze	Jessica Hardy	Swimming	Women's 50 m breaststroke	4 August

== Diving ==
American divers were eligible for two spots in each individual event (1 m, 3 m, and 10 m) and one team spot for each synchronized event (3 m and 10 m). All in all, fifteen divers (seven men and eight women) were selected to represent The United States at this year's world championships. Notable divers featured reigning Olympic champion David Boudia and bronze medal pair Troy Dumais and Kristian Ipsen.

Men

Athlete	Event	Preliminaries		Semifinals		Final	
Athlete	Event	Points	Rank	Points	Rank	Points	Rank
Kristian Ipsen	1 m springboard	343.40	14	—N/a		Did not advance	
Harrison Jones	1 m springboard	333.10	17	—N/a		Did not advance	
Kristian Ipsen	3 m springboard	413.90	12 Q	427.55	10 Q	413.35	12
David Boudia	10 m platform	503.30	2 Q	534.40	1 Q	517.40	2nd place, silver medalist(s)
Harrison Jones	10 m platform	375.00	19	Did not advance			
Troy Dumais; Michael Hixon	3 m synchronized springboard	406.98	5 Q	—N/a		410.85	5
David Bonuchi; Toby Stanley	10 m synchronized platform	360.75	9 Q	—N/a		372.84	10

Women

Athlete	Event	Preliminaries		Semifinals		Final	
Athlete	Event	Points	Rank	Points	Rank	Points	Rank
Deidre Freeman	1 m springboard	263.00	5 Q	—N/a		236.30	11
Samantha Pickens	1 m springboard	232.65	14	—N/a		Did not advance	
Deidre Freeman	3 m springboard	256.80	22	Did not advance			
Maren Taylor	3 m springboard	273.30	15 Q	307.90	9 Q	304.60	11
Amelia Cozad	10 m platform	325.20	5 Q	294.00	14	Did not advance	
Victoria Lamp	10 m platform	279.25	18 Q	312.25	9 Q	301.20	10
Amanda Burke; Samantha Pickens	3 m synchronized springboard	265.92	8 Q	—N/a		284.64	8
Samantha Bromberg; Cheyenne Cousineau	10 m synchronized platform	285.15	9 Q	—N/a		301.74	7

== High diving ==
Five athletes were selected to represent The United States in high diving at this year's world championships. David Colturi was initially entered but did not compete.

Athlete	Event	Points	Rank
Kent DeMond	Men's high diving	420.70	11
Steve Lobue	Men's high diving	445.80	9
Cesilie Carlton	Women's high diving	211.60	1st place, gold medalist(s)
Ginger Huber	Women's high diving	206.70	2nd place, silver medalist(s)
Tara Hyer Tira	Women's high diving	177.20	5

== Open water swimming ==
Eight open water swimmers were qualified based on their performances at the USA Swimming Open Water National Championships. The official roster featured Olympic silver medalist Haley Anderson for the women's events, and 2012 Olympians Andrew Gemmell and Alex Meyer for the men's events.

Men

Athlete	Event	Time	Rank
Andrew Gemmell	5 km	53:38.7	13
Alex Meyer	10 km	1:51:01.8	42
Alex Meyer	25 km	4:47:28.2	4
Sean Ryan	5 km	53:45.9	22
Sean Ryan	10 km	1:51:43.7	50
Jordan Wilimovsky	25 km	4:49:11.1	14

Women

Athlete	Event	Time	Rank
Haley Anderson	5 km	56:34.2	1st place, gold medalist(s)
Eva Fabian	25 km	5:07:20.4	3rd place, bronze medalist(s)
Christine Jennings	10 km	1:58:23.6	10
Christine Jennings	25 km	5:07:32.3	6
Rebecca Mann	5 km	56:46.4	8
Rebecca Mann	10 km	1:58:23.4	8

Mixed

Athlete	Event	Time	Rank
Andrew Gemmell; Sean Ryan; Haley Anderson	Team	54:44.7	6

== Swimming ==
U.S. swimmers earned qualifying standards in the following events (up to a maximum of 2 swimmers in each event at the A-standard entry time, and 1 at the B-standard): Swimmers qualified at the 2013 U.S. World Championships Trials in Indianapolis, Indiana.

The U.S. team consisted of 44 swimmers (22 males and females each). Thirty of these swimmers have competed at the 2012 Summer Olympics in London including undisputed superstars Ryan Lochte and Missy Franklin, and notable Olympic champions Dana Vollmer, Matt Grevers, Nathan Adrian, Tyler Clary, and Katie Ledecky.

Men

Athlete	Event	Heat		Semifinal		Final	
Athlete	Event	Time	Rank	Time	Rank	Time	Rank
Nathan Adrian	50 m freestyle	21.88	6 Q	21.60	=3 Q	21.60	4
Nathan Adrian	100 m freestyle	48.93	12 Q	47.95	1 Q	47.84	3rd place, bronze medalist(s)
Tyler Clary	200 m backstroke	1:56.76	1 Q	1:55.16	1 Q	1:54.64	3rd place, bronze medalist(s)
Tyler Clary	200 m butterfly	1:56.03	1 Q	1:55.97	=4 Q	1:56.34	7
Tyler Clary	400 m individual medley	4:13.55	3 Q	—N/a		4:10.38	4
Kevin Cordes	50 m breaststroke	27.69	21	Did not advance			
Kevin Cordes	100 m breaststroke	1:00.01	6 Q	59.78	=2 Q	1:00.02	7
Kevin Cordes	200 m breaststroke	2:11.40	11 Q	2:10.03	9	Did not advance	
Conor Dwyer	200 m freestyle	1:47.90	=9 Q	1:47.05	6 Q	1:45.32	2nd place, silver medalist(s)
Conor Dwyer	200 m individual medley	1:58.78	10 Q	1:58.56	10	Did not advance	
Anthony Ervin	50 m freestyle	21.87	5 Q	21.42	2 Q	21.65	6
Jimmy Feigen	100 m freestyle	48.86	9 Q	48.07	2 Q	47.82	2nd place, silver medalist(s)
Nic Fink	100 m breaststroke	1:00.24	=12 Q	59.84	=5 Q	1:00.10	8
Eugene Godsoe	50 m butterfly	23.31	7 Q	23.16	8 Q	23.05	2nd place, silver medalist(s)
Eugene Godsoe	100 m butterfly	52.38	14 Q	51.96	11	Did not advance	
Matt Grevers	50 m backstroke	25.08	10 Q	24.79	=4 Q	24.54	2nd place, silver medalist(s)
Matt Grevers	100 m backstroke	53.92	6 Q	52.97	1 Q	52.93	1st place, gold medalist(s)
Matt Grevers	50 m butterfly	23.29	6 Q	23.35	12	Did not advance	
Connor Jaeger	400 m freestyle	3:47.83	7 Q	—N/a		3:44.85	3rd place, bronze medalist(s)
Connor Jaeger	800 m freestyle	7:49.28	1 Q	—N/a		7:44.26	4
Connor Jaeger	1500 m freestyle	14:56.62	3 Q	—N/a		14:47.96	4
B.J. Johnson	200 m breaststroke	2:11.64	15 Q	2:10.79	12	Did not advance	
Chase Kalisz	400 m individual medley	4:11.87	1 Q	—N/a		4:09.22	2nd place, silver medalist(s)
Ryan Lochte	200 m freestyle	1:47.90	=9 Q	1:46.06	2 Q	1:45.64	4
Ryan Lochte	200 m backstroke	1:57.19	3 Q	1:55.88	2 Q	1:53.79	1st place, gold medalist(s)
Ryan Lochte	100 m butterfly	52.26	13 Q	51.48	1 Q	51.58	6
Ryan Lochte	200 m individual medley	1:58.46	5 Q	1:57.07	1 Q	1:54.98	1st place, gold medalist(s)
Tom Luchsinger	200 m butterfly	1:56.32	3 Q	1:56.10	8 Q	1:55.70	5
Michael McBroom	800 m freestyle	7:50.62	4 Q	—N/a		7:43.60	2nd place, silver medalist(s)
Michael McBroom	1500 m freestyle	14:59.73	7 Q	—N/a		14:53.95	5
Matt McLean	400 m freestyle	3:49.74	13	—N/a		Did not advance	
David Plummer	50 m backstroke	24.91	5 Q	26.00	6	Did not advance	
David Plummer	100 m backstroke	53.62	2 Q	53.10	2 Q	53.12	2nd place, silver medalist(s)
Kevin Steel	50 m breaststroke	27.45	10 Q	27.60	12	Did not advance	
Nathan Adrian; Ricky Berens*; Conor Dwyer*; Anthony Ervin; Jimmy Feigen; Ryan Lochte	4×100 m freestyle relay	3:11.69	1 Q	—N/a		3:11.18	2nd place, silver medalist(s)
Ricky Berens; Conor Dwyer; Charlie Houchin; Michael Klueh*; Matt McLean*; Ryan Lochte	4×200 m freestyle relay	7:08.05	1 Q	—N/a		7:01.72	1st place, gold medalist(s)
Nathan Adrian; Kevin Cordes; Jimmy Feigen*; Nic Fink*; Eugene Godsoe*; Matt Grevers; Ryan Lochte; David Plummer*	4×100 m medley relay	3:32.72	1 Q	—N/a		DSQ	

Women

Athlete	Event	Heat		Semifinal		Final	
Athlete	Event	Time	Rank	Time	Rank	Time	Rank
Cammille Adams	200 m butterfly	2:07.83	6 Q	2:06.75	2 Q	2:07.73	7
Elizabeth Beisel	200 m individual medley	2:11.16	4 Q	2:11.69	12	Did not advance	
Elizabeth Beisel	400 m individual medley	4:35.17	6 Q	—N/a		4:31.69	3rd place, bronze medalist(s)
Rachel Bootsma	50 m backstroke	28.28	6 Q	27.93	6 Q	28.05	7
Natalie Coughlin	50 m freestyle	25.00	9 Q	25.02	11	Did not advance	
Madeline Dirado	200 m butterfly	2:10.25	13 Q	2:08.28	12	Did not advance	
Madeline Dirado	400 m individual medley	4:37.39	7 Q	—N/a		4:31.70	4
Claire Donahue	100 m butterfly	58.58	10 Q	58.44	8 Q	58.30	8
Missy Franklin	100 m freestyle	53.36	2 Q	53.78	5 Q	53.47	4
Missy Franklin	200 m freestyle	1:56.90	5 Q	1:56.05	2 Q	1:54.81	1st place, gold medalist(s)
Missy Franklin	50 m backstroke	28.44	=13 Q	Withdrew			
Missy Franklin	100 m backstroke	59.13	1 Q	59.31	1 Q	58.42	1st place, gold medalist(s)
Missy Franklin	200 m backstroke	2:07.57	1 Q	2:06.46	1 Q	2:04.76 CR	1st place, gold medalist(s)
Jessica Hardy	50 m breaststroke	29.99	2 Q	29.90	3 Q	29.80 AM	3rd place, bronze medalist(s)
Jessica Hardy	100 m breaststroke	1:05.18	2 Q	1:06.10	4 Q	1:05.52	3rd place, bronze medalist(s)
Breeja Larson	50 m breaststroke	30.46	4 Q	30.20	4 Q	29.95	4
Breeja Larson	100 m breaststroke	1:06.83	6 Q	1:06.61	5 Q	1:06.74	5
Breeja Larson	200 m breaststroke	2:26.90	10 Q	2:26.22	12	Did not advance	
Micah Lawrence	200 m breaststroke	2:21.74	1 Q	2:23.23	4 Q	2:22.37	3rd place, bronze medalist(s)
Katie Ledecky	400 m freestyle	4:03.05	1 Q	—N/a		3:59.82 AM	1st place, gold medalist(s)
Katie Ledecky	800 m freestyle	8:20.65	1 Q	—N/a		8:13.86 WR	1st place, gold medalist(s)
Katie Ledecky	1500 m freestyle	15:49.26	2 Q	—N/a		15:36.53 WR	1st place, gold medalist(s)
Caitlin Leverenz	200 m individual medley	2:11.54	5 Q	2:11.05	7 Q	2:10.73	5
Christine Magnuson	50 m butterfly	26.12	5 Q	26.19	10	Did not advance	
Simone Manuel	50 m freestyle	24.93	7 Q	24.91	8 Q	24.80	7
Elizabeth Pelton	100 m backstroke	59.94	3 Q	59.44	3 Q	59.45	4
Elizabeth Pelton	200 m backstroke	2:09.56	7 Q	2:08.20	3 Q	2:08.98	5
Chloe Sutton	400 m freestyle	4:07.16	10	—N/a		Did not advance	
Chloe Sutton	800 m freestyle	8:27.41	8 Q	—N/a		8:27.75	6
Chloe Sutton	1500 m freestyle	16:04.72	7 Q	—N/a		16:09.65	8
Dana Vollmer	50 m butterfly	26.29	7 Q	26.06	5 Q	26.46	8
Dana Vollmer	100 m butterfly	57.22	1 Q	57.84	4 Q	57.24	3rd place, bronze medalist(s)
Shannon Vreeland	100 m freestyle	54.25	8 Q	53.99	7 Q	54.49	8
Shannon Vreeland	200 m freestyle	1:58.08	11 Q	1:56.76	8 Q	1:57.41	7
Natalie Coughlin; Missy Franklin; Simone Manuel*; Megan Romano; Shannon Vreeland	4×100 m freestyle relay	3:36.22	1 Q	—N/a		3:32.31 AM	1st place, gold medalist(s)
Karlee Bispo; Chelsea Chenault*; Madeline Dirado*; Missy Franklin; Katie Ledecky; Jordan Mattern*; Shannon Vreeland	4×200 m freestyle relay	7:53.03	3 Q	—N/a		7:45.14	1st place, gold medalist(s)
Claire Donahue*; Missy Franklin; Jessica Hardy; Breeja Larson*; Elizabeth Pelton*; Megan Romano; Dana Vollmer; Shannon Vreeland*	4×100 m medley relay	3:58.66	1 Q	—N/a		3:53.23	1st place, gold medalist(s)

== Synchronized swimming ==
U.S. synchronized swimmers earned qualifying standards in the following events.

Athlete	Event	Preliminaries		Final	
Athlete	Event	Points	Rank	Points	Rank
Rebecca Kay Moody	Solo free routine	84.040	13	Did not advance	
Mary Killman	Solo technical routine	88.100	9 Q	87.300	10

== Water polo ==
=== Men's tournament ===
Team roster

- Merrill Moses
- Janson Wigo
- Alexander Obert
- Alexander Bowen
- Matthew De Trane
- Chancellor Ramirez
- J. W. Krumpholz
- Tony Azevedo
- Shea Buckner
- Tim Hutten
- Michael Rosenthal
- John Mann
- Andrew Stevens

Group play

	Pld	W	D	L	GF	GA	GD	Pts
Croatia	3	3	0	0	41	15	+26	6
United States	3	2	0	1	31	19	+12	4
Canada	3	1	0	2	32	32	0	2
South Africa	3	0	0	3	14	52	−38	0

22 July 2013; 10:50	Report	Croatia	9–7	United States	Piscines Bernat Picornell, Barcelona; Attendance: 300; Referees: Bender (GER), Moller (ARG)
22 July 2013; 10:50	Report	Score by quarters: 1–1, 2–2, 3–1, 3–3			Piscines Bernat Picornell, Barcelona; Attendance: 300; Referees: Bender (GER), Moller (ARG)
22 July 2013; 10:50	Report	three players 2	Goals	de Trane, Mann 2	Piscines Bernat Picornell, Barcelona; Attendance: 300; Referees: Bender (GER), Moller (ARG)

24 July 2013; 09:30	Report	South Africa	3–16	United States	Piscines Bernat Picornell, Barcelona; Attendance: 600; Referees: Balfanbayev (KAZ), Ni (CHN)
24 July 2013; 09:30	Report	Score by quarters: 0–4, 1–5, 2–5, 0–2			Piscines Bernat Picornell, Barcelona; Attendance: 600; Referees: Balfanbayev (KAZ), Ni (CHN)
24 July 2013; 09:30	Report	Bell 2	Goals	Mann 5	Piscines Bernat Picornell, Barcelona; Attendance: 600; Referees: Balfanbayev (KAZ), Ni (CHN)

26 July 2013; 20:10	Report	Canada	7–8	United States	Piscines Bernat Picornell, Barcelona; Attendance: 1,000; Referees: Golijanin (SRB), Flahive (AUS)
26 July 2013; 20:10	Report	Score by quarters: 2–2, 0–1, 1–2, 4–3			Piscines Bernat Picornell, Barcelona; Attendance: 1,000; Referees: Golijanin (SRB), Flahive (AUS)
26 July 2013; 20:10	Report	McElroy 3	Goals	Bowen 3	Piscines Bernat Picornell, Barcelona; Attendance: 1,000; Referees: Golijanin (SRB), Flahive (AUS)

Round of 16

28 July 2013; 13:30	Report	United States	6–10	Spain	Piscines Bernat Picornell, Barcelona; Attendance: 1,300; Referees: Peris (CRO), Alexandrescu (ROU)
28 July 2013; 13:30	Report	Score by quarters: 2–4, 2–1, 1–2, 1–3			Piscines Bernat Picornell, Barcelona; Attendance: 1,300; Referees: Peris (CRO), Alexandrescu (ROU)
28 July 2013; 13:30	Report	Wigo 3	Goals	Español 4	Piscines Bernat Picornell, Barcelona; Attendance: 1,300; Referees: Peris (CRO), Alexandrescu (ROU)

=== Women's tournament ===
Team roster

- Elizabeth Armstrong
- Lauren Silver
- Melissa Seidemann
- Rachel Fattal
- Caroline Clark
- Maggie Steffens
- Courtney Mathewson
- Kiley Neushul
- Jillian Kraus
- Kelly Rulon
- Annika Dries
- Kami Craig
- Tumua Anae

Group play

	Pld	W	D	L	GF	GA	GD	Pts
United States	3	3	0	0	38	20	+18	6
Canada	3	1	1	1	30	27	+3	3
Greece	3	1	1	1	29	27	+2	3
Great Britain	3	0	0	3	20	43	−23	0

21 July 2013; 13:30	Report	United States	12–8	Greece	Piscines Bernat Picornell, Barcelona; Attendance: 360; Referees: Borrell (ESP), Koryzna (POL)
21 July 2013; 13:30	Report	Score by quarters: 1–2, 3–2, 4–2, 4–2			Piscines Bernat Picornell, Barcelona; Attendance: 360; Referees: Borrell (ESP), Koryzna (POL)
21 July 2013; 13:30	Report	Steffens 3	Goals	Tsoukala, Roumpesi 3	Piscines Bernat Picornell, Barcelona; Attendance: 360; Referees: Borrell (ESP), Koryzna (POL)

23 July 2013; 13:30	Report	United States	10–8	Canada	Piscines Bernat Picornell, Barcelona; Attendance: 200; Referees: Alexandrescu (ROU), Williams (NZL)
23 July 2013; 13:30	Report	Score by quarters: 4–1, 2–2, 3–2, 1–3			Piscines Bernat Picornell, Barcelona; Attendance: 200; Referees: Alexandrescu (ROU), Williams (NZL)
23 July 2013; 13:30	Report	Silver, Seidemann 2	Goals	Perreault 3	Piscines Bernat Picornell, Barcelona; Attendance: 200; Referees: Alexandrescu (ROU), Williams (NZL)

25 July 2013; 09:30	Report	United States	16–4	Great Britain	Piscines Bernat Picornell, Barcelona; Attendance: 500; Referees: Melliar (RSA), Flahive (AUS)
25 July 2013; 09:30	Report	Score by quarters: 4–0, 2–2, 3–1, 7–1			Piscines Bernat Picornell, Barcelona; Attendance: 500; Referees: Melliar (RSA), Flahive (AUS)
25 July 2013; 09:30	Report	Clark 3	Goals	Gibson-Byrne 2	Piscines Bernat Picornell, Barcelona; Attendance: 500; Referees: Melliar (RSA), Flahive (AUS)

Round of 16

27 July 2013; 17:30	Report	United States	14–3	Brazil	Piscines Bernat Picornell, Barcelona; Attendance: 400; Referees: Makita (JPN), Skovpina (UZB)
27 July 2013; 17:30	Report	Score by quarters: 3–0, 7–1, 2–2, 2–0			Piscines Bernat Picornell, Barcelona; Attendance: 400; Referees: Makita (JPN), Skovpina (UZB)
27 July 2013; 17:30	Report	five players 2	Goals	three players 1	Piscines Bernat Picornell, Barcelona; Attendance: 400; Referees: Makita (JPN), Skovpina (UZB)

Quarterfinal

29 July 2013; 21:45	Report	Spain	9–6	United States	Piscines Bernat Picornell, Barcelona; Attendance: 3,300; Referees: Koryzna (POL), Bianchi (ITA)
29 July 2013; 21:45	Report	Score by quarters: 4–2, 1–2, 1–1, 3–1			Piscines Bernat Picornell, Barcelona; Attendance: 3,300; Referees: Koryzna (POL), Bianchi (ITA)
29 July 2013; 21:45	Report	Pareja 4	Goals	Craig 3	Piscines Bernat Picornell, Barcelona; Attendance: 3,300; Referees: Koryzna (POL), Bianchi (ITA)

5th–8th place semifinal

31 July 2013; 17:00	Report	United States	12–11	Netherlands	Piscines Bernat Picornell, Barcelona; Attendance: 400; Referees: Peris (CRO), Flahive (AUS)
31 July 2013; 17:00	Report	Score by quarters: 2–2, 4–3, 3–2, 3–4			Piscines Bernat Picornell, Barcelona; Attendance: 400; Referees: Peris (CRO), Flahive (AUS)
31 July 2013; 17:00	Report	five players 2	Goals	Klaassen 4	Piscines Bernat Picornell, Barcelona; Attendance: 400; Referees: Peris (CRO), Flahive (AUS)

Fifth place game

2 August 2013; 20:45	Report	Greece	12–15 (OT)	United States	Piscines Bernat Picornell, Barcelona; Attendance: 4,400; Referees: Terepenka (CAN), Taylan (TUR)
2 August 2013; 20:45	Report	Score by quarters: 4–4, 1–2, 1–3, 4–1 OT: 1–0, 0–1 pen. 1–4			Piscines Bernat Picornell, Barcelona; Attendance: 4,400; Referees: Terepenka (CAN), Taylan (TUR)
2 August 2013; 20:45	Report	Avramidou 4	Goals	Mathewson 3	Piscines Bernat Picornell, Barcelona; Attendance: 4,400; Referees: Terepenka (CAN), Taylan (TUR)

== See also ==
The United States at other World Championships in 2013

- United States at the 2013 UCI Road World Championships
- United States at the 2013 World Championships in Athletics
