= Poland at the 2013 World Aquatics Championships =

- Flag of Poland
- FINA code: POL
- National federation: Polski Związek Pływacki
- Website: www.kppzp.pl

in Barcelona, Spain
- Medals Ranked 21st: Gold 0 Silver 2 Bronze 1 Total 3

World Aquatics Championships appearances
- 1973; 1975; 1978; 1982; 1986; 1991; 1994; 1998; 2001; 2003; 2005; 2007; 2009; 2011; 2013; 2015; 2017; 2019; 2022; 2023; 2024

Poland competed at the 2013 World Aquatics Championships in Barcelona, Spain between 19 July and 4 August 2013.

== Medalists ==
| Medal | Name | Sport | Event | Date |
|---|---|---|---|---|
| Silver | Paweł Korzeniowski | Swimming | Men's 200 m butterfly | 31 July |
| Silver | Radosław Kawęcki | Swimming | Men's 200 m backstroke | 2 August |
| Bronze | Konrad Czerniak | Swimming | Men's 100 m butterfly | 3 August |

== Diving ==
Poland qualified 2 quota places for the following diving events.

Men

| Athlete | Event | Preliminaries | | Semifinals | | Final | |
| Athlete | Event | Points | Rank | Points | Rank | Points | Rank |
|---|---|---|---|---|---|---|---|
| Andrzej Rzeszutek | 1 m springboard | 338.45 | 15 | — | | did not advance | |
| Andrzej Rzeszutek | 3 m springboard | 358.25 | 27 | did not advance | | | |

== High diving ==
Poland qualified one quota places for the following high diving event.

| Athlete | Event | Points | Rank |
|---|---|---|---|
| Kris Kolanus | Men's high diving | 460.15 | 8 |

== Swimming ==
Polish swimmers earned qualifying standards in the following events (up to a maximum of 2 swimmers in each event at the A-standard entry time, and 1 at the B-standard):

Men

| Athlete | Event | Heat | | Semifinal | | Final | |
| Athlete | Event | Time | Rank | Time | Rank | Time | Rank |
|---|---|---|---|---|---|---|---|
| Konrad Czerniak | 100 m freestyle | 48.50 | 2 Q | 48.78 | 15 | did not advance | |
| Konrad Czerniak | 50 m butterfly | 23.72 | 21 | did not advance | | | |
| Konrad Czerniak | 100 m butterfly | 52.12 | 9 Q | 51.55 | 3 Q | 51.46 | 3rd place, bronze medalist(s) |
| Paweł Furtek | 800 m freestyle | 8:00.56 | 21 | — | | did not advance | |
| Paweł Furtek | 1500 m freestyle | 15:13.88 | 14 | — | | did not advance | |
| Radosław Kawęcki | 100 m backstroke | 54.20 NR | =10 Q | 53.82 NR | 9 | did not advance | |
| Radosław Kawęcki | 200 m backstroke | 1:57.99 | 11 Q | 1:56.14 | =3 Q | 1:54.24 EU | 2nd place, silver medalist(s) |
| Paweł Korzeniowski | 100 m butterfly | 52.16 | 11 Q | 51.85 | 9 | did not advance | |
| Paweł Korzeniowski | 200 m butterfly | 1:56.61 | 7 Q | 1:55.67 | 3 Q | 1:55.01 | 2nd place, silver medalist(s) |
| Sławomir Kuczko | 200 m breaststroke | 2:12.21 | 20 | did not advance | | | |
| Mikołaj Machnik | 200 m breaststroke | 2:11.98 | 19 | did not advance | | | |
| Michał Poprawa | 200 m butterfly | 1:58.34 | 20 | did not advance | | | |
| Mateusz Sawrymowicz | 1500 m freestyle | 15:06.45 | 10 | — | | did not advance | |
| Jan Świtkowski | 200 m freestyle | 1:48.93 | 23 | did not advance | | | |
| Jan Świtkowski | 200 m individual medley | 2:02.40 | 30 | did not advance | | | |
| Dawid Szulich | 50 m breaststroke | 27.48 NR | 11 Q | 27.53 | =10 | did not advance | |
| Dawid Szulich | 100 m breaststroke | 1:00.54 NR | 18 | did not advance | | | |
| Filip Zaborowski | 400 m freestyle | 3:50.22 | 15 | — | | did not advance | |
| Filip Zaborowski | 800 m freestyle | 7:55.65 | 10 | — | | did not advance | |
| Filip Bujoczek; Michał Poprawa; Jan Świtkowski; Dawid Ziełinski | 4 × 200 m freestyle relay | 7:19.07 | 14 | — | | did not advance | |
| Konrad Czerniak; Radosław Kawęcki; Paweł Korzeniowski; Dawid Szulich | 4 × 100 m medley relay | DSQ | | — | | did not advance | |

Women

| Athlete | Event | Heat | | Semifinal | | Final | |
| Athlete | Event | Time | Rank | Time | Rank | Time | Rank |
|---|---|---|---|---|---|---|---|
| Anna Dowgiert | 50 m butterfly | 26.72 | 22 | did not advance | | | |
| Klaudia Naziębło | 50 m backstroke | 28.65 | 19 | did not advance | | | |
| Klaudia Naziębło | 100 m backstroke | 1:01.77 | 22 | did not advance | | | |
| Klaudia Naziębło | 200 m backstroke | 2:14.76 | 28 | did not advance | | | |
| Aleksandra Urbańczyk | 50 m freestyle | 25.01 | =10 Q | 25.03 | 12 | did not advance | |
| Aleksandra Urbańczyk | 50 m backstroke | 28.37 | =9 Q | 28.25 | =10 | did not advance | |
