= Australia at the 2013 World Aquatics Championships =

- Flag of Australia
- World Aquatics code: AUS
- National federation: Swimming Australia
- Website: swimming.org.au

in Barcelona, Spain
- Medals Ranked 6th: Gold 3 Silver 11 Bronze 0 Total 14

World Aquatics Championships appearances
- 1973; 1975; 1978; 1982; 1986; 1991; 1994; 1998; 2001; 2003; 2005; 2007; 2009; 2011; 2013; 2015; 2017; 2019; 2022; 2023; 2024; 2025

Australia competed at the 2013 World Aquatics Championships in Barcelona, Spain from 19 July to 4 August 2013.

== Medalists ==
Medal	Name	Sport	Event	Date
Gold	Christian Sprenger	Swimming	Men's 100 m breaststroke	29 July
Gold	James Magnussen	Swimming	Men's 100 m freestyle	1 August
Gold	Cate Campbell	Swimming	Women's 100 m freestyle	2 August
Silver	Cate Campbell; Bronte Campbell; Brittany Elmslie*; Emma McKeon; Alicia Coutts; Emily Seebohm*	Swimming	Women's 4 × 100 m freestyle relay	28 July
Silver	Alicia Coutts	Swimming	Women's 100 m butterfly	29 July
Silver	Alicia Coutts	Swimming	Women's 200 m individual medley	29 July
Silver	Emily Seebohm	Swimming	Women's 100 m backstroke	30 July
Silver	Christian Sprenger	Swimming	Men's 50 m breaststroke	31 July
Silver	Bronte Barratt; Alicia Coutts; Brittany Elmslie; Kylie Palmer; Ami Matsuo*; Emma McKeon*	Swimming	Women's 4 × 200 m freestyle relay	1 August
Silver	Australia women's national water polo team: Lea Barta; Jayde Appel; Hannah Buckling; Holly Lincoln-Smith; Isobel Bishop; Bronwen Knox; Rowena Webster; Glencora Ralph; Zoe Arancini; Ashleigh Southern; Keesja Gofers; Nicola Zagame; Kelsey Wakefield	Water polo	Women's tournament	2 August
Silver	Belinda Hocking	Swimming	Women's 200 m backstroke	3 August
Silver	Cate Campbell	Swimming	Women's 50 m freestyle	4 August
Silver	Tommaso D'Orsogna; Ashley Delaney; James Magnussen; Cameron McEvoy*; Christian Sprenger; Kenneth To*	Swimming	Men's 4 × 100 m medley relay	4 August
Silver	Cate Campbell; Alicia Coutts; Sally Foster; Emma McKeon*; Samantha Marshall*; Emily Seebohm	Swimming	Women's 4 × 100 m medley relay	4 August

Medals by sport
Sport	1st place, gold medalist(s)	2nd place, silver medalist(s)	3rd place, bronze medalist(s)	Total
Swimming	3	10	0	6
Water polo	0	1	0	1
Total	3	11	0	14

Medals by date
Date	1st place, gold medalist(s)	2nd place, silver medalist(s)	3rd place, bronze medalist(s)	Total
20 July	0	0	0	0
21 July	0	0	0	0
22 July	0	0	0	0
23 July	0	0	0	0
24 July	0	0	0	0
25 July	0	0	0	0
26 July	0	0	0	0
27 July	0	0	0	0
28 July	0	1	0	1
29 July	1	2	0	3
30 July	0	1	0	1
31 July	0	1	0	1
1 August	1	1	0	2
2 August	1	1	0	2
3 August	0	1	0	1
4 August	0	3	0	3
Total	3	11	0	14

^{*} – Indicates the athlete competed in preliminaries but not the final relay.

== Diving ==
Men

Athlete	Event	Preliminaries		Semifinals		Final	
Athlete	Event	Points	Rank	Points	Rank	Points	Rank
Grant Nel	3 m springboard	416.40	10 Q	440.05	6 Q	420.75	11

Women

Athlete	Event	Preliminaries		Semifinals		Final	
Athlete	Event	Points	Rank	Points	Rank	Points	Rank
Brittany Broben	1 m springboard	239.20	11 Q	—N/a		241.85	10
Brittany Broben	10 m platform	285.65	17 Q	287.30	16	did not advance	
Maddison Keeney	1 m springboard	225.50	18	—N/a		did not advance	
Jaele Patrick	3 m springboard	291.60	10 Q	276.50	15	did not advance	
Anabelle Smith	3 m springboard	306.75	6 Q	311.20	7 Q	320.25	9
Sherilyse Gowlett; Maddison Keeney	3 m synchronized springboard	284.07	4 Q	—N/a		279.03	8
Emily Boyd; Lara Tarvit	10 m synchronized platform	295.92	7 Q	—N/a		309.78	4

== Open water swimming ==
Australia qualified seven swimmers.

Men

Athlete	Event	Time	Rank
Simon Huitenga	10 km	1:49:29.7	12
Rhys Mainstone	5 km	53:44.4	19
Rhys Mainstone	10 km	1:49:30.4	13
Rhys Mainstone	25 km	4:51:08.2	19
Jarrod Poort	5 km	53:34.3	5

Women

Athlete	Event	Time	Rank
Danielle DeFrancesco	5 km	56:48.2	11
Melissa Gorman	10 km	1:58:30.9	20
Chelsea Gubecka	10 km	1:59:16.3	30
Bonnie MacDonald	5 km	57:01.3	14

Mixed

Athlete	Event	Time	Rank
Simon Huitenga; Jarrod Poort; Melissa Gorman	Team	54:16.1	4

== Swimming ==
Australian swimmers achieved qualifying standards in the following events (up to a maximum of 2 swimmers in each event at the A-standard entry time, and 1 at the B-standard):

Men

Athlete	Event	Heat		Semifinal		Final	
Athlete	Event	Time	Rank	Time	Rank	Time	Rank
Matthew Abood	50 m freestyle	21.84	4 Q	21.91	11	did not advance	
Ashley Delaney	50 m backstroke	25.36	13 Q	25.21	12	did not advance	
Ashley Delaney	100 m backstroke	53.60	1 Q	53.74	7 Q	53.55	6
Tommaso D'Orsogna	100 m butterfly	52.82	19	did not advance			
Thomas Fraser-Holmes	200 m freestyle	1:48.05	12 Q	1:47.21	7 Q	1:47.11	8
Thomas Fraser-Holmes	400 m individual medley	4:14.52	7 Q	—N/a		4:17.46	8
Jordan Harrison	400 m freestyle	3:46.85	3 Q	—N/a		3:48.40	=6
Jordan Harrison	800 m freestyle	7:52.55	8 Q	—N/a		7:47.38	5
Jordan Harrison	1500 m freestyle	14:58.62	6 Q	—N/a		15:00.44	6
Grant Irvine	200 m butterfly	1:57.18	12 Q	1:56.95	14	did not advance	
Mitch Larkin	200 m backstroke	1:59.34	17	did not advance			
Matson Lawson	200 m backstroke	1:57.48	6 Q	1:57.55	10	did not advance	
James Magnussen	50 m freestyle	22.04	=11 Q	21.79	9	did not advance	
James Magnussen	100 m freestyle	47.71	1 Q	48.20	=4 Q	47.71	1st place, gold medalist(s)
Cameron McEvoy	100 m freestyle	48.59	6 Q	48.43	7 Q	47.88	4
Cameron McEvoy	200 m freestyle	1:47.34	5 Q	1:47.31	=8* Q	1:46.63	7
David McKeon	400 m freestyle	3:49.51	12	—N/a		did not advance	
Brenton Rickard	50 m breaststroke	27.66	20	did not advance			
Brenton Rickard	100 m breaststroke	1:00.52	17	did not advance			
Christian Sprenger	50 m breaststroke	27.30	4 Q	27.10	4 Q	26.78 OC	2nd place, silver medalist(s)
Christian Sprenger	100 m breaststroke	59.53	1 Q	59.23	1 Q	58.79	1st place, gold medalist(s)
Matt Targett	50 m butterfly	23.36	9 Q	23.39	13	did not advance	
Kenneth To	200 m individual medley	1:59.21	11 Q	1:59.54	13	did not advance	
Daniel Tranter	200 m individual medley	1:58.76	=8 Q	1:58.10	7 Q	1:57.88	6
Chris Wright	50 m butterfly	24.01	28	did not advance			
Chris Wright	100 m butterfly	52.83	20	did not advance			
Tommaso D'Orsogna; James Magnussen; Cameron McEvoy; James Roberts; Matt Targett*; Kenneth To*	4 × 100 m freestyle relay	3:13.04	3 Q	—N/a		3:11.58	4
Alexander Graham; Jarrod Killey; Ned McKendry; David McKeon	4 × 200 m freestyle relay	7:13.52	9	—N/a		did not advance	
Tommaso D'Orsogna; Ashley Delaney; James Magnussen; Cameron McEvoy*; Christian Sprenger; Kenneth To*	4 × 100 m medley relay	3:33.64	=2 Q	—N/a		3:31.64	2nd place, silver medalist(s)

Cameron McEvoy tied for the eighth and final spot in the final of the 200 m freestyle with Sebastiaan Verschuren from the Netherlands. However, Verschuren withdrew from the swimoff to focus on the 100 m freestyle event which allowed McEvoy to advance to the final.

Women

Athlete	Event	Heat		Semifinal		Final	
Athlete	Event	Time	Rank	Time	Rank	Time	Rank
Jessica Ashwood	800 m freestyle	8:27.74	10	—N/a		did not advance	
Bronte Barratt	200 m freestyle	1:57.14	7 Q	1:57.18	12	did not advance	
Bronte Barratt	400 m freestyle	4:09.65	13	—N/a		did not advance	
Bronte Campbell	50 m freestyle	24.65	3 Q	24.62	5 Q	24.66	=5
Bronte Campbell	100 m freestyle	54.67	12 Q	54.46	11	did not advance	
Cate Campbell	50 m freestyle	24.27	1 Q	24.19	1 Q	24.14	2nd place, silver medalist(s)
Cate Campbell	100 m freestyle	53.24	1 Q	53.09	2 Q	52.34	1st place, gold medalist(s)
Alicia Coutts	50 m butterfly	26.56	18	did not advance			
Alicia Coutts	100 m butterfly	57.56	4 Q	57.49	3 Q	56.97	2nd place, silver medalist(s)
Alicia Coutts	200 m individual medley	2:11.88	7 Q	2:10.06	3 Q	2:09.39	2nd place, silver medalist(s)
Brittany Elmslie	50 m butterfly	26.03	4 Q	26.13	9	did not advance	
Brittany Elmslie	100 m butterfly	58.27	8 Q	58.56	10	did not advance	
Sally Foster	100 m breaststroke	1:07.59	9 Q	1:08.04	12	did not advance	
Sally Foster	200 m breaststroke	2:27.41	12 Q	2:24.14	6 Q	2:24.01	7
Chelsea Gubecka	1500 m freestyle	16:21.82	13	—N/a		did not advance	
Belinda Hocking	50 m backstroke	28.80	21	did not advance			
Belinda Hocking	100 m backstroke	1:00.39	9 Q	1:00.24	8 Q	1:00.29	8
Belinda Hocking	200 m backstroke	2:07.64	2 Q	2:08.49	4 Q	2:06.66	2nd place, silver medalist(s)
Samantha Marshall	50 m breaststroke	31.49	15 Q	31.26	11	did not advance	
Samantha Marshall	100 m breaststroke	1:08.33	15 Q	1:08.31	15	did not advance	
Meagan Nay	200 m backstroke	2:10.62	9 Q	2:11.72	15	did not advance	
Kylie Palmer	200 m freestyle	1:57.67	10 Q	1:56.53	7 Q	1:57.14	6
Kylie Palmer	400 m freestyle	4:05.01	5 Q	—N/a		4:08.13	8
Emily Seebohm	50 m backstroke	28.48	15 Q	28.29	12	did not advance	
Emily Seebohm	100 m backstroke	1:00.02	5 Q	59.38	2 Q	59.06	2nd place, silver medalist(s)
Emily Seebohm	200 m individual medley	2:11.12	3 Q	2:10.70	6 Q	Withdrew	
Cate Campbell; Bronte Campbell; Brittany Elmslie*; Emma McKeon; Alicia Coutts; Emily Seebohm*	4 × 100 m freestyle relay	3:36.46	2 Q	—N/a		3:32.43 OC	2nd place, silver medalist(s)
Bronte Barratt; Alicia Coutts; Brittany Elmslie; Ami Matsuo*; Emma McKeon*; Kylie Palmer	4 × 200 m freestyle relay	7:52.69	2 Q	—N/a		7:47.08	2nd place, silver medalist(s)
Cate Campbell; Alicia Coutts; Sally Foster; Emma McKeon*; Samantha Marshall*; Emily Seebohm	4 × 100 m medley relay	3:58.73	2 Q	—N/a		3:55.22	2nd place, silver medalist(s)

== Synchronised swimming ==
Athlete	Event	Preliminaries		Final	
Athlete	Event	Points	Rank	Points	Rank
Olia Burtaev; Bianca Hammett	Duet free routine	70.180	30	did not advance	
Olia Burtaev; Bianca Hammett	Duet technical routine	71.700	22	did not advance	

Reserves

- Amie Thompson
- Jade Haynes-Love

== Water polo ==
=== Men's tournament ===
Team roster

- Joel Dennerley
- Richard Campbell
- Matthew Martin
- John Cotterill
- Nathan Power
- Jarrod Gilchrist
- Aidan Roach
- Aaron Younger
- Joel Swift
- Tyler Martin
- Rhys Howden
- William Miller
- James Clark

Group play

	Pld	W	D	L	GF	GA	GD	Pts
Serbia	3	3	0	0	39	26	+13	6
Hungary	3	1	1	1	32	27	+5	3
Australia	3	1	1	1	25	26	−1	3
China	3	0	0	3	21	38	−17	0

22 July 2013; 13:30	Report	Serbia	10–7	Australia	Piscines Bernat Picornell, Barcelona; Attendance: 300; Referees: Borrell (ESP), Stavridis (GRE)
22 July 2013; 13:30	Report	Score by quarters: 4–3, 2–0, 1–2, 3–2			Piscines Bernat Picornell, Barcelona; Attendance: 300; Referees: Borrell (ESP), Stavridis (GRE)
22 July 2013; 13:30	Report	Udovičić, Pijetlović 3	Goals	seven players 1	Piscines Bernat Picornell, Barcelona; Attendance: 300; Referees: Borrell (ESP), Stavridis (GRE)

24 July 2013; 12:10	Report	China	7–9	Australia	Piscines Bernat Picornell, Barcelona; Attendance: 455; Referees: Naumov (RUS), Abramović (MNE)
24 July 2013; 12:10	Report	Score by quarters: 1–4, 1–2, 1–2, 4–1			Piscines Bernat Picornell, Barcelona; Attendance: 455; Referees: Naumov (RUS), Abramović (MNE)
24 July 2013; 12:10	Report	Zhang Jian 2	Goals	Howden 3	Piscines Bernat Picornell, Barcelona; Attendance: 455; Referees: Naumov (RUS), Abramović (MNE)

26 July 2013; 10:50	Report	Hungary	9–9	Australia	Piscines Bernat Picornell, Barcelona; Attendance: 1,100; Referees: Margeta (SLO), Stavridis (GRE)
26 July 2013; 10:50	Report	Score by quarters: 3–3, 1–1, 3–3, 2–2			Piscines Bernat Picornell, Barcelona; Attendance: 1,100; Referees: Margeta (SLO), Stavridis (GRE)
26 July 2013; 10:50	Report	Vámos 3	Goals	Campbell 5	Piscines Bernat Picornell, Barcelona; Attendance: 1,100; Referees: Margeta (SLO), Stavridis (GRE)

Round of 16

28 July 2013; 21:30	Report	Germany	4–8	Australia	Piscines Bernat Picornell, Barcelona; Attendance: 900; Referees: Borrell (ESP), Bianchi (ITA)
28 July 2013; 21:30	Report	Score by quarters: 0–2, 2–2, 0–1, 2–3			Piscines Bernat Picornell, Barcelona; Attendance: 900; Referees: Borrell (ESP), Bianchi (ITA)
28 July 2013; 21:30	Report	Nossek 2	Goals	three players 2	Piscines Bernat Picornell, Barcelona; Attendance: 900; Referees: Borrell (ESP), Bianchi (ITA)

Quarterfinal

30 July 2013; 17:00	Report	Croatia	7–6 (OT)	Australia	Piscines Bernat Picornell, Barcelona; Attendance: 800; Referees: Borrell (ESP), Bianchi (ITA)
30 July 2013; 17:00	Report	Score by quarters: 1–1, 1–1, 0–1, 3–2 OT: 1–1, 1–0			Piscines Bernat Picornell, Barcelona; Attendance: 800; Referees: Borrell (ESP), Bianchi (ITA)
30 July 2013; 17:00	Report	Joković 2	Goals	Miller 2	Piscines Bernat Picornell, Barcelona; Attendance: 800; Referees: Borrell (ESP), Bianchi (ITA)

5th–8th place semifinal

1 August 2013; 15:30	Report	Greece	11–9	Australia	Piscines Bernat Picornell, Barcelona; Attendance: 600; Referees: Golijanin (SRB), Bianchi (ITA)
1 August 2013; 15:30	Report	Score by quarters: 3–1, 4–3, 2–4, 2–1			Piscines Bernat Picornell, Barcelona; Attendance: 600; Referees: Golijanin (SRB), Bianchi (ITA)
1 August 2013; 15:30	Report	Delakas, Vlachopoulos 3	Goals	Younger 3	Piscines Bernat Picornell, Barcelona; Attendance: 600; Referees: Golijanin (SRB), Bianchi (ITA)

Seventh place game

3 August 2013; 15:00	Report	Australia	7–13	Serbia	Piscines Bernat Picornell, Barcelona; Attendance: 500; Referees: Peris (CRO), Moller (ARG)
3 August 2013; 15:00	Report	Score by quarters: 2–3, 2–2, 2–4, 1–4			Piscines Bernat Picornell, Barcelona; Attendance: 500; Referees: Peris (CRO), Moller (ARG)
3 August 2013; 15:00	Report	Swift, Howden 2	Goals	Filipović 5	Piscines Bernat Picornell, Barcelona; Attendance: 500; Referees: Peris (CRO), Moller (ARG)

=== Women's tournament ===
Team roster

- Lea Barta
- Jayde Appel
- Hannah Buckling
- Holly Lincoln-Smith
- Isobel Bishop
- Bronwen Knox
- Rowena Webster
- Glencora Ralph
- Zoe Arancini
- Ashleigh Southern
- Keesja Gofers
- Nicola Zagame
- Kelsey Wakefield

Group play

	Pld	W	D	L	GF	GA	GD	Pts
Australia	3	3	0	0	45	10	+35	6
China	3	2	0	1	35	21	+14	4
New Zealand	3	1	0	2	22	35	−13	2
South Africa	3	0	0	3	10	46	−36	0

21 July 2013; 10:50	Report	Australia	15–4	New Zealand	Piscines Bernat Picornell, Barcelona; Attendance: 320; Referees: Vogel (HUN), Cardenuto (BRA)
21 July 2013; 10:50	Report	Score by quarters: 3–1, 4–2, 4–0, 4–1			Piscines Bernat Picornell, Barcelona; Attendance: 320; Referees: Vogel (HUN), Cardenuto (BRA)
21 July 2013; 10:50	Report	Webster 4	Goals	Mason 2	Piscines Bernat Picornell, Barcelona; Attendance: 320; Referees: Vogel (HUN), Cardenuto (BRA)

23 July 2013; 10:50	Report	Australia	14–5	China	Piscines Bernat Picornell, Barcelona; Attendance: 400; Referees: Bianchi (ITA), Bender (GER)
23 July 2013; 10:50	Report	Score by quarters: 1–3, 3–2, 6–0, 4–0			Piscines Bernat Picornell, Barcelona; Attendance: 400; Referees: Bianchi (ITA), Bender (GER)
23 July 2013; 10:50	Report	McGhie 3	Goals	Liu Ping 2	Piscines Bernat Picornell, Barcelona; Attendance: 400; Referees: Bianchi (ITA), Bender (GER)

25 July 2013; 18:50	Report	Australia	16–1	South Africa	Piscines Bernat Picornell, Barcelona; Attendance: 200; Referees: Makita (JPN), Balfanbayev (KAZ)
25 July 2013; 18:50	Report	Score by quarters: 4–0, 5–1, 5–0, 2–0			Piscines Bernat Picornell, Barcelona; Attendance: 200; Referees: Makita (JPN), Balfanbayev (KAZ)
25 July 2013; 18:50	Report	Lincoln-Smith, Webster 3	Goals	White 1	Piscines Bernat Picornell, Barcelona; Attendance: 200; Referees: Makita (JPN), Balfanbayev (KAZ)

Round of 16

27 July 2013; 10:50	Report	Australia	25–2	Uzbekistan	Piscines Bernat Picornell, Barcelona; Attendance: 100; Referees: Moller (ARG), Littlejohn (GBR)
27 July 2013; 10:50	Report	Score by quarters: 6–0, 5–1, 5–1, 9–0			Piscines Bernat Picornell, Barcelona; Attendance: 100; Referees: Moller (ARG), Littlejohn (GBR)
27 July 2013; 10:50	Report	Buckling 6	Goals	Sarancha 2	Piscines Bernat Picornell, Barcelona; Attendance: 100; Referees: Moller (ARG), Littlejohn (GBR)

Quarterfinal

29 July 2013; 17:00	Report	Australia	9–5	Greece	Piscines Bernat Picornell, Barcelona; Attendance: 500; Referees: Margeta (SLO), Alexandrescu (ROU)
29 July 2013; 17:00	Report	Score by quarters: 3–1, 1–1, 2–2, 3–1			Piscines Bernat Picornell, Barcelona; Attendance: 500; Referees: Margeta (SLO), Alexandrescu (ROU)
29 July 2013; 17:00	Report	four players 2	Goals	Avramidou, Roumpesi 2	Piscines Bernat Picornell, Barcelona; Attendance: 500; Referees: Margeta (SLO), Alexandrescu (ROU)

Semifinal

31 July 2013; 20:15	Report	Russia	6–9	Australia	Piscines Bernat Picornell, Barcelona; Attendance: 2,200; Referees: Margeta (SLO), Bianchi (ITA)
31 July 2013; 20:15	Report	Score by quarters: 2–1, 1–3, 1–2, 2–3			Piscines Bernat Picornell, Barcelona; Attendance: 2,200; Referees: Margeta (SLO), Bianchi (ITA)
31 July 2013; 20:15	Report	Ivanova 2	Goals	Zagame 3	Piscines Bernat Picornell, Barcelona; Attendance: 2,200; Referees: Margeta (SLO), Bianchi (ITA)

Final

2 August 2013; 22:15	Report	Australia	6–8	Spain	Piscines Bernat Picornell, Barcelona; Attendance: 4,500; Referees: Koryzna (POL), Bender (GER)
2 August 2013; 22:15	Report	Score by quarters: 1–2, 2–3, 1–1, 2–2			Piscines Bernat Picornell, Barcelona; Attendance: 4,500; Referees: Koryzna (POL), Bender (GER)
2 August 2013; 22:15	Report	six players 1	Goals	three players 2	Piscines Bernat Picornell, Barcelona; Attendance: 4,500; Referees: Koryzna (POL), Bender (GER)

== See also ==
Australia at other World Championships in 2013

- Australia at the 2013 UCI Road World Championships
- Australia at the 2013 World Championships in Athletics
