= Swimming at the 2013 World Aquatics Championships – Men's 200 metre individual medley =

Men's 200 metre individual medley at the 2013 World Aquatics Championships
- Venue: Palau Sant Jordi
- Dates: July 31, 2013 (heats & semifinals); August 1, 2013 (final)
- Competitors: 50 from 42 nations
- Winning time: 1:54.98

Medalists
gold medal	Ryan Lochte	United States
silver medal	Kosuke Hagino	Japan
bronze medal	Thiago Pereira	Brazil

Barcelona Palau San Jordi

The men's 200 metre individual medley event in swimming at the 2013 World Aquatics Championships took place on 31 July and 1 August at the Palau Sant Jordi in Barcelona, Spain.

== Records ==
Prior to this competition, the existing world and championship records were:

World record	Ryan Lochte (USA)	1:54.00	Shanghai, China	28 July 2011
Competition record	Ryan Lochte (USA)	1:54.00	Shanghai, China	28 July 2011

== Results ==
=== Heats ===
The heats were held at 10:51.

Rank	Heat	Lane	Name	Nationality	Time	Notes
1	3	4	László Cseh	Hungary	1:57.70	Q
2	4	4	Kosuke Hagino	Japan	1:57.73	Q
3	4	2	Wang Shun	China	1:57.83	Q
4	4	7	Simon Sjödin	Sweden	1:58.02	Q, NR
5	5	4	Ryan Lochte	United States	1:58.46	Q
6	5	5	Thiago Pereira	Brazil	1:58.54	Q
7	4	5	Henrique Rodrigues	Brazil	1:58.73	Q
8	3	5	Daniel Tranter	Australia	1:58.76	Q
8	4	6	Markus Deibler	Germany	1:58.76	Q
10	5	3	Conor Dwyer	United States	1:58.78	Q
11	3	2	Kenneth To	Australia	1:59.21	Q
12	5	6	Daiya Seto	Japan	1:59.25	Q
13	4	8	Diogo Carvalho	Portugal	1:59.39	Q, NR
14	3	3	Roberto Pavoni	Great Britain	1:59.41	Q
15	5	1	Mao Feilian	China	1:59.68	Q
16	3	8	Joseph Schooling	Singapore	1:59.99	Q
17	4	3	Jérémy Stravius	France	2:00.00	
18	3	7	Gal Nevo	Israel	2:00.01	
19	5	7	Federico Turrini	Italy	2:00.02	
20	4	1	Yakov-Yan Toumarkin	Israel	2:00.13	
21	5	0	Albert Puig	Spain	2:00.49	
22	5	2	Ieuan Lloyd	Great Britain	2:00.65	
23	3	1	Andrew Ford	Canada	2:01.69	
24	5	8	Raphaël Stacchiotti	Luxembourg	2:01.71	
25	2	3	Jakub Maly	Austria	2:01.92	
26	5	9	Michael Meyer	South Africa	2:01.96	
27	4	0	Taki Mrabet	Tunisia	2:02.22	
28	3	6	Philip Heintz	Germany	2:02.23	
29	2	0	Mohamed Khaled	Egypt	2:02.29	NR
30	3	9	Jan Świtkowski	Poland	2:02.40	
31	2	8	Yury Suvorau	Belarus	2:02.60	NR
32	2	4	Aleksey Derlyugov	Uzbekistan	2:02.79	
33	4	9	Ward Bauwens	Belgium	2:03.24	
34	2	2	Maksym Shemberev	Ukraine	2:03.49	
35	1	6	Irakli Bolkvadze	Georgia	2:03.55	
36	2	5	Im Tae-Jeong	South Korea	2:03.61	
37	2	7	Bogdan Knezevic	Serbia	2:03.72	
37	2	9	Ensar Hajder	Bosnia and Herzegovina	2:03.72	NR
39	1	4	Pavel Janecek	Czech Republic	2:03.83	
40	3	0	Mitchell Donaldson	New Zealand	2:03.89	
41	2	1	Fran Krznarić	Croatia	2:04.51	
42	1	3	Pedro Pinotes	Angola	2:04.85	
43	1	2	Christoph Meier	Liechtenstein	2:05.08	NR
44	2	6	Miguel Robles	Mexico	2:05.43	
45	1	5	Vasilii Danilov	Kyrgyzstan	2:07.66	
46	1	1	Marko Blaževski	North Macedonia	2:07.78	
47	1	8	Bartal Hestoy	Faroe Islands	2:09.46	NR
48	1	0	Eli Ebenezer Wong	Northern Mariana Islands	2:09.59	
49	1	7	Jean Luis Gomez	Dominican Republic	2:10.78	
50	1	9	Douglas Miller	Fiji	2:14.27	

=== Semifinals ===
The semifinals were held at 19:16.

==== Semifinal 1 ====
Rank	Lane	Name	Nationality	Time	Notes
1	4	Kosuke Hagino	Japan	1:57.38	Q
2	3	Thiago Pereira	Brazil	1:57.52	Q
3	7	Daiya Seto	Japan	1:58.03	Q
4	6	Daniel Tranter	Australia	1:58.10	Q
5	5	Simon Sjödin	Sweden	1:58.17	Q
6	2	Conor Dwyer	United States	1:58.56	
7	1	Roberto Pavoni	Great Britain	1:59.44	
8	8	Joseph Schooling	Singapore	2:00.49	

==== Semifinal 2 ====
Rank	Lane	Name	Nationality	Time	Notes
1	3	Ryan Lochte	United States	1:57.07	Q
2	4	László Cseh	Hungary	1:57.41	Q
3	5	Wang Shun	China	1:57.80	Q
4	2	Markus Deibler	Germany	1:58.53	
5	6	Henrique Rodrigues	Brazil	1:59.47	
6	7	Kenneth To	Australia	1:59.54	
7	8	Mao Feilian	China	1:59.65	
8	1	Diogo Carvalho	Portugal	2:00.09	

=== Final ===
The final was held at 18:13.

Rank	Lane	Name	Nationality	Time	Notes
1st place, gold medalist(s)	4	Ryan Lochte	United States	1:54.98	
2nd place, silver medalist(s)	5	Kosuke Hagino	Japan	1:56.29	
3rd place, bronze medalist(s)	6	Thiago Pereira	Brazil	1:56.30	
4	2	Wang Shun	China	1:56.86	NR
5	3	László Cseh	Hungary	1:57.70	
6	1	Daniel Tranter	Australia	1:57.88	
7	7	Daiya Seto	Japan	1:58.45	
8	8	Simon Sjödin	Sweden	1:59.79	
