= Swimming at the 2013 World Aquatics Championships – Men's 200 metre freestyle =

Men's 200 metre freestyle at the 2013 World Aquatics Championships
- Venue: Palau Sant Jordi
- Dates: July 29, 2013 (heats & semifinals); July 30, 2013 (final)
- Competitors: 68 from 58 nations
- Winning time: 1:44.20

Medalists
gold medal	Yannick Agnel	France
silver medal	Conor Dwyer	United States
bronze medal	Danila Izotov	Russia

Barcelona Palau San Jordi

The men's 200 metre freestyle event in swimming at the 2013 World Aquatics Championships took place on 29–30 July at the Palau Sant Jordi in Barcelona, Spain.

== Records ==
Prior to this competition, the existing world and championship records were:

World record	Paul Biedermann (GER)	1:42.00	Rome, Italy	28 July 2009
Competition record	Paul Biedermann (GER)	1:42.00	Rome, Italy	28 July 2009

== Results ==
=== Heats ===
The heats were held at 10:47.

Rank	Heat	Lane	Name	Nationality	Time	Notes
1	7	6	Robert Renwick	Great Britain	1:46.88	Q
2	5	8	Nicolas Oliveira	Brazil	1:46.99	Q
3	5	6	Sebastiaan Verschuren	Netherlands	1:47.24	Q
4	5	5	Kosuke Hagino	Japan	1:47.33	Q
5	7	5	Cameron McEvoy	Australia	1:47.34	Q
6	7	4	Yannick Agnel	France	1:47.40	Q
7	7	3	Danila Izotov	Russia	1:47.76	Q
8	7	7	Pieter Timmers	Belgium	1:47.89	Q
9	6	4	Ryan Lochte	United States	1:47.90	Q
9	6	5	Conor Dwyer	United States	1:47.90	Q
11	5	2	Matthew Stanley	New Zealand	1:48.01	Q
12	5	4	Thomas Fraser-Holmes	Australia	1:48.05	Q
13	7	2	Velimir Stjepanović	Serbia	1:48.12	Q
14	7	9	Li Yunqi	China	1:48.18	Q
15	5	3	Wang Shun	China	1:48.19	Q
16	6	2	Clemens Rapp	Germany	1:48.37	Q
17	6	3	Nikita Lobintsev	Russia	1:48.41	
18	6	0	Alex di Giorgio	Italy	1:48.47	
19	5	1	Dion Dreesens	Netherlands	1:48.50	
19	6	7	Dimitri Colupaev	Germany	1:48.50	
21	7	0	Marco Belotti	Italy	1:48.66	
22	6	8	Ieuan Lloyd	Great Britain	1:48.92	
23	5	7	Jan Świtkowski	Poland	1:48.93	
24	4	5	Cristian Quintero	Venezuela	1:48.96	
25	7	1	Glenn Surgeloose	Belgium	1:49.04	
26	6	6	Grégory Mallet	France	1:49.10	
27	4	4	Víctor Martín	Spain	1:49.22	
28	5	0	Blake Worsley	Canada	1:49.30	
29	4	9	Marwan Ismail	Egypt	1:49.33	NR
30	4	7	Matias Koski	Finland	1:49.37	
31	5	9	Ahmed Mathlouthi	Tunisia	1:49.43	
32	4	3	David Brandl	Austria	1:49.61	
33	6	9	Nimrod Shapira Bar-Or	Israel	1:49.78	
34	4	2	Joseph Schooling	Singapore	1:50.15	
35	7	8	Dominik Meichtry	Switzerland	1:50.24	
36	3	2	Tomas Havránek	Czech Republic	1:50.56	
37	3	6	Povilas Strazdas	Lithuania	1:50.86	
38	3	8	Mateo de Angulo	Colombia	1:51.14	
39	6	1	Ben Hockin	Paraguay	1:51.46	
40	3	5	Jessie Lacuna	Philippines	1:51.76	
41	4	0	Doğa Çelik	Turkey	1:51.79	
42	3	0	Ensar Hajder	Bosnia and Herzegovina	1:51.84	NR
43	3	4	Jeong Jeong-Soo	South Korea	1:51.86	
44	3	1	Uvis Kalniņš	Latvia	1:51.91	
45	3	3	Wang Yu-lian	Chinese Taipei	1:52.10	
46	4	8	Lim Ching Hwang	Malaysia	1:52.49	
47	4	1	Ihar Boki	Belarus	1:52.60	
48	3	9	Long Yuan Miguel Gutierrez Feng	Mexico	1:52.94	
49	2	3	Nicholas Schwab	Dominican Republic	1:53.07	
50	3	7	Raphaël Stacchiotti	Luxembourg	1:53.55	
51	2	6	Marko Blaževski	North Macedonia	1:54.26	
52	2	7	Jemal Le Grand	Aruba	1:55.08	
53	2	4	Welliam Maksi	Syria	1:56.02	
54	2	2	Kevin Avila Soto	Guatemala	1:56.74	
55	1	6	Khader Baqleh	Jordan	1:56.94	
56	2	1	Mathieu Marquet	Mauritius	1:57.48	
57	2	0	Ahmed Gebrel	Palestine	1:57.68	
58	2	5	Pham Thanh Nguyen	Vietnam	2:00.15	
59	1	4	Evin Zekthi	Albania	2:00.43	
60	1	3	Pol Arias	Andorra	2:00.44	
61	1	2	Sovijja Pou	Cambodia	2:01.06	
62	2	8	Abdoul Niane	Senegal	2:02.01	
63	1	5	Guillermo Lopéz	Nicaragua	2:03.95	
64	2	9	Adam Viktoria	Seychelles	2:04.44	
65	1	9	Noah Al-Khulaifi	Qatar	2:06.62	
66	1	7	Haris Bandey	Pakistan	2:09.85	
67	1	1	Suleyman Atayev	Turkmenistan	2:13.46	
68	1	0	Sirish Gurung	Nepal	2:14.56	
69	1	8	Ammaar Ghadiyali	Tanzania	2:15.28	
	4	6	Leith Shankland	South Africa		DNS

=== Semifinals ===
The semifinals were held at 19:13.

==== Semifinal 1 ====
Rank	Lane	Name	Nationality	Time	Notes
1	5	Kosuke Hagino	Japan	1:46.87	Q
2	3	Yannick Agnel	France	1:47.01	Q
3	2	Conor Dwyer	United States	1:47.05	Q
4	7	Thomas Fraser-Holmes	Australia	1:47.21	Q
5	1	Li Yunqi	China	1:47.36	
6	4	Nicolas Oliveira	Brazil	1:47.42	
7	8	Clemens Rapp	Germany	1:47.51	
8	6	Pieter Timmers	Belgium	1:47.99	

==== Semifinal 2 ====
Rank	Lane	Name	Nationality	Time	Notes
1	6	Danila Izotov	Russia	1:45.84	Q
2	2	Ryan Lochte	United States	1:46.06	Q
3	4	Robert Renwick	Great Britain	1:46.95	Q
4	3	Cameron McEvoy	Australia	1:47.31	QSO
4	5	Sebastiaan Verschuren	Netherlands	1:47.31	QSO
6	1	Velimir Stjepanović	Serbia	1:47.53	
7	8	Wang Shun	China	1:47.84	
8	7	Matthew Stanley	New Zealand	1:48.35	

==== Swim-off ====
Rank	Lane	Name	Nationality	Time	Notes
		Cameron McEvoy	Australia		
		Sebastiaan Verschuren	Netherlands	WD	

Verschuren withdrew from the swimoff to focus on the 100 m freestyle event.

=== Final ===
The final was held at 18:02.

Rank	Lane	Name	Nationality	Time	Notes
1st place, gold medalist(s)	2	Yannick Agnel	France	1:44.20	
2nd place, silver medalist(s)	7	Conor Dwyer	United States	1:45.32	
3rd place, bronze medalist(s)	4	Danila Izotov	Russia	1:45.59	
4	5	Ryan Lochte	United States	1:45.64	
5	3	Kosuke Hagino	Japan	1:45.94	
6	6	Robert Renwick	Great Britain	1:46.52	
7	8	Cameron McEvoy	Australia	1:46.63	
8	1	Thomas Fraser-Holmes	Australia	1:47.11	
