= Swimming at the 2013 World Aquatics Championships – Women's 100 metre freestyle =

Women's 100 metre freestyle at the 2013 World Aquatics Championships
- Venue: Palau Sant Jordi
- Dates: August 1, 2013 (heats & semifinals); August 2, 2013 (final)
- Competitors: 73 from 66 nations
- Winning time: 52.34

Medalists
gold medal	Cate Campbell	Australia
silver medal	Sarah Sjöström	Sweden
bronze medal	Ranomi Kromowidjojo	Netherlands

Barcelona Palau San Jordi

The women's 100 metre freestyle event in swimming at the 2013 World Aquatics Championships took place on 1–2 August at the Palau Sant Jordi in Barcelona, Spain.

== Records ==
Prior to this competition, the existing world and championship records were:

World record	Britta Steffen (GER)	52.07	Rome, Italy	31 July 2009
Competition record	Britta Steffen (GER)	52.07	Rome, Italy	31 July 2009

== Results ==
=== Heats ===
The heats were held a 10:00.

Rank	Heat	Lane	Name	Nationality	Time	Notes
1	8	4	Cate Campbell	Australia	53.24	Q
2	8	5	Missy Franklin	United States	53.36	Q
3	8	3	Sarah Sjöström	Sweden	53.61	Q
4	6	6	Britta Steffen	Germany	53.93	Q
5	7	4	Ranomi Kromowidjojo	Netherlands	54.12	Q
6	6	4	Tang Yi	China	54.21	Q
6	7	6	Femke Heemskerk	Netherlands	54.21	Q
8	8	6	Shannon Vreeland	United States	54.25	Q
9	6	3	Arianna Vanderpool-Wallace	Bahamas	54.42	Q
10	7	2	Michelle Coleman	Sweden	54.53	Q
11	8	2	Veronika Popova	Russia	54.53	Q
12	7	3	Bronte Campbell	Australia	54.67	Q
13	7	5	Camille Muffat	France	54.84	Q, WD
14	6	7	Pernille Blume	Denmark	54.88	Q
15	7	1	Qiu Yuhan	China	54.93	Q
16	5	2	Karin Prinsloo	South Africa	55.05	Q
17	7	8	Evelyn Verrasztó	Hungary	55.08	Q
18	8	1	Charlotte Bonnet	France	55.15	
19	6	1	Victoria Poon	Canada	55.30	
20	8	8	Hanna-Maria Seppälä	Finland	55.34	
21	6	2	Amy Smith	Great Britain	55.40	
22	8	7	Daniela Schreiber	Germany	55.44	
23	6	8	Melanie Costa	Spain	55.51	
24	6	0	Erika Ferraioli	Italy	55.54	
25	5	4	Kimberly Buys	Belgium	55.68	NR
26	7	9	Liliana Ibáñez	Mexico	55.70	NR
27	7	0	Rūta Meilutytė	Lithuania	55.72	
28	7	7	Haruka Ueda	Japan	55.78	
29	5	6	Samantha Lucie-Smith	New Zealand	55.84	
30	5	5	Elmira Aigaliyeva	Kazakhstan	55.89	
31	8	9	Nina Rangelova	Bulgaria	55.95	
32	5	3	Julie Meynen	Luxembourg	56.16	
32	8	0	Alessandra Marchioro	Brazil	56.16	
34	4	4	Sycerika McMahon	Ireland	56.19	
35	4	3	Jasmine Al-Khaldi	Philippines	56.37	
36	5	8	Isabella Arcila	Colombia	56.62	
37	5	1	Miroslava Najdanovski	Serbia	56.66	
38	5	7	Quah Ting Wen	Singapore	56.70	
39	5	9	Farida Osman	Egypt	56.84	
40	6	9	Aksana Dziamidava	Belarus	57.30	
41	3	2	Chinyere Pigot	Suriname	57.34	
42	4	0	Elisbet Gamez	Cuba	57.66	
43	5	0	Susann Bjørnsen	Norway	56.73	
44	4	6	Anastasia Bogdanovski	North Macedonia	57.78	
45	4	9	Yamilé Bahamonde	Ecuador	57.79	
46	3	7	Julimar Avila	Honduras	57.92	
47	3	4	Bayan Jumah	Syria	58.13	
48	4	7	Pamela Benitez	El Salvador	58.16	
49	4	8	Karen Torrez	Bolivia	58.27	
50	4	2	Benjaporn Sriphanomithorn	Thailand	58.33	
51	4	5	Sabina Dostálová	Czech Republic	58.39	
52	4	1	Karen Riveros	Paraguay	58.44	
53	3	5	Allyson Ponson	Aruba	58.61	
54	1	6	Heather Arseth	Mauritius	58.73	
55	3	3	Monika Vasilyan	Armenia	59.08	
56	3	6	Sylvia Brunlehner	Kenya	59.18	
57	3	9	Rebecca Heyliger	Bermuda	59.50	
58	3	8	Ana Nobrega	Angola	1:00.15	
59	3	1	Mónica Ramírez	Andorra	1:00.98	
60	3	0	Jamila Lunkuse	Uganda	1:01.25	NR
61	1	3	Sabine Hazboun	Palestine	1:02.86	
62	2	3	Tiara Shahril	Brunei	1:02.88	
63	2	5	Sameera Al-Bitar	Bahrain	1:05.32	
64	2	4	Britany van Lange	Guyana	1:05.56	
65	2	6	Merjen Saryyeva	Turkmenistan	1:05.96	
66	2	7	Charissa Panuve	Tonga	1:07.10	
67	2	2	Rachel Wall	Antigua and Barbuda	1:08.43	
68	2	1	Dirngulbai Misech	Palau	1:09.46	
69	2	8	Shreya Dhital	Nepal	1:11.12	
70	1	4	Karina Klimyk	Tajikistan	1:15.45	
71	2	9	Elsie Uwamahoro	Burundi	1:16.63	
72	2	0	Vivie Geneva Chamberlain	Laos	1:17.75	
73	1	5	Nazlati Mohamed Andhumdine	Comoros	1:33.88	
	6	5	Jeanette Ottesen	Denmark		DNS

=== Semifinals ===
The semifinals were held at 18:02.

==== Semifinal 1 ====
Rank	Lane	Name	Nationality	Time	Notes
1	4	Missy Franklin	United States	53.78	Q
2	5	Britta Steffen	Germany	53.85	Q
3	6	Shannon Vreeland	United States	53.99	Q
4	3	Tang Yi	China	54.09	Q
5	7	Bronte Campbell	Australia	54.46	
6	2	Michelle Coleman	Sweden	54.62	
7	8	Evelyn Verrasztó	Hungary	55.32	
8	1	Qiu Yuhan	China	55.61	

==== Semifinal 2 ====
Rank	Lane	Name	Nationality	Time	Notes
1	5	Sarah Sjöström	Sweden	52.87	Q, NR
2	4	Cate Campbell	Australia	53.09	Q
3	3	Ranomi Kromowidjojo	Netherlands	53.29	Q
4	6	Femke Heemskerk	Netherlands	53.68	Q
5	7	Veronika Popova	Russia	54.15	
6	2	Arianna Vanderpool-Wallace	Bahamas	54.44	
7	1	Pernille Blume	Denmark	54.68	
8	8	Karin Prinsloo	South Africa	55.00	

=== Final ===
The final was held at 18:02.

Rank	Lane	Name	Nationality	Time	Notes
1st place, gold medalist(s)	5	Cate Campbell	Australia	52.34	
2nd place, silver medalist(s)	4	Sarah Sjöström	Sweden	52.89	
3rd place, bronze medalist(s)	3	Ranomi Kromowidjojo	Netherlands	53.42	
4	2	Missy Franklin	United States	53.47	
5	6	Femke Heemskerk	Netherlands	53.67	
6	7	Britta Steffen	Germany	53.75	
7	8	Tang Yi	China	54.27	
8	1	Shannon Vreeland	United States	54.49	
