= Japan at the 2013 World Aquatics Championships =

- Flag of Japan
- World Aquatics code: JPN
- National federation: Japan Swimming Federation
- Website: www.swim.or.jp

in Barcelona, Spain
- Medals Ranked 13th: Gold 1 Silver 2 Bronze 3 Total 6

World Aquatics Championships appearances
- 1973; 1975; 1978; 1982; 1986; 1991; 1994; 1998; 2001; 2003; 2005; 2007; 2009; 2011; 2013; 2015; 2017; 2019; 2022; 2023; 2024; 2025

Japan competed at the 2013 World Aquatics Championships in Barcelona, Spain between 19 July and 4 August 2013.

== Medalists ==
Medal	Name	Sport	Event	Date
Gold	Daiya Seto	Swimming	Men's 400 m individual medley	4 August
Silver	Kosuke Hagino	Swimming	Men's 400 m freestyle	28 July
Silver	Kosuke Hagino	Swimming	Men's 200 m individual medley	1 August
Bronze	Aya Terakawa	Swimming	Women's 100 m backstroke	30 July
Bronze	Aya Terakawa	Swimming	Women's 50 m backstroke	1 August
Bronze	Takuro Fujii; Ryosuke Irie; Kosuke Kitajima; Shinri Shioura	Swimming	Men's 4×100 m medley relay	4 August

== Diving ==
Japan qualified four quota places for the following diving events:

Men

Athlete	Event	Preliminaries		Semifinals		Final	
Athlete	Event	Points	Rank	Points	Rank	Points	Rank
Sho Sakai	3 m springboard	421.75	7 Q	416.10	12 Q	433.40	8

Women

Athlete	Event	Preliminaries		Semifinals		Final	
Athlete	Event	Points	Rank	Points	Rank	Points	Rank
Sayaka Shibusawa	3 m springboard	262.80	18 Q	284.25	14	Did not advance	
Mai Nakagawa	10 m platform	321.65	6 Q	272.05	17	Did not advance	
Fuka Tatsumi	10 m platform	320.50	7 Q	267.80	18	Did not advance	
Mai Nakagawa; Sayaka Shibusawa	3 m synchronized springboard	262.50	11 Q	—		250.50	11

== Open water swimming ==
Japan qualified three quota places for the following events in open water swimming:

Athlete	Event	Time	Rank
Yasunari Hirai	Men's 10 km	1:49:52.8	21
Yuto Kobayashi	Men's 5 km	53:48.0	25
Yuto Kobayashi	Men's 10 km	1:50:17.4	26
Yumi Kida	Women's 10 km	1:58:25.8	13
Yumi Kida	Women's 25 km	5:16:25.7	8
Yasunari Hirai; Yuto Kobayashi; Yumi Kida	Mixed team	58:00.0	13

== Swimming ==
Japanese swimmers achieved qualifying standards in the following events (up to a maximum of 2 swimmers in each event at the A-standard entry time, and 1 at the B-standard): Among the official roster featured former Olympic champion Kosuke Kitajima and undisputed superstar Kosuke Hagino.

Men

Athlete	Event	Heat		Semifinal		Final	
Athlete	Event	Time	Rank	Time	Rank	Time	Rank
Takuro Fujii	100 m butterfly	52.50	15 Q	52.27	13	Did not advance	
Kosuke Hagino	200 m freestyle	1:47.33	4 Q	1:46.87	3 Q	1:45.94	5
Kosuke Hagino	400 m freestyle	3:46.92	4 Q	—		3:44.82 NR	2nd place, silver medalist(s)
Kosuke Hagino	100 m backstroke	53.94	7 Q	53.68	6 Q	53.93	6
Kosuke Hagino	200 m backstroke	1:57.52	7 Q	1:56.24	4 Q	1:55.43	5
Kosuke Hagino	200 m individual medley	1:57.73	2 Q	1:57.38	2 Q	1:56.29	2nd place, silver medalist(s)
Kosuke Hagino	400 m individual medley	4:13.80	4 Q	—		4:10.77	5
Ayatsugu Hirai	800 m freestyle	7:56.69	14	—		Did not advance	
Ayatsugu Hirai	1500 m freestyle	15:03.45	9	—		Did not advance	
Ryosuke Irie	50 m backstroke	DNS		Did not advance			
Ryosuke Irie	100 m backstroke	53.66	4 Q	53.41	4 Q	53.29	4
Ryosuke Irie	200 m backstroke	1:57.53	8 Q	1:56.14	=3 Q	1:55.07	4
Kenta Ito	50 m freestyle	22.77	28	Did not advance			
Kenta Ito	100 m freestyle	49.91	=31	Did not advance			
Kosuke Kitajima	50 m breaststroke	27.43	9 Q	27.82	15	Did not advance	
Kosuke Kitajima	100 m breaststroke	59.88	=3 Q	59.92	8 Q	59.98	6
Yuki Kobori	100 m butterfly	53.11	=25	Did not advance			
Yuki Kobori	200 m butterfly	1:56.64	8 Q	1:56.15	9	Did not advance	
Takeshi Matsuda	200 m butterfly	1:57.14	11 Q	1:56.42	11	Did not advance	
Yōsuke Miyamoto	1500 m freestyle	15:09.21	=12	—		Did not advance	
Daiya Seto	200 m individual medley	1:59.25	12 Q	1:58.03	6 Q	1:58.45	7
Daiya Seto	400 m individual medley	4:12.96	2 Q	—		4:08.69	1st place, gold medalist(s)
Shinri Shioura	50 m freestyle	22.02	10 Q	22.04	15	Did not advance	
Shinri Shioura	100 m freestyle	48.52	4 Q	48.51	10	Did not advance	
Ryo Tateishi	200 m breaststroke	2:10.41	6 Q	2:10.01	8 Q	2:10.28	8
Akihiro Yamaguchi	100 m breaststroke	1:00.69	19	Did not advance			
Akihiro Yamaguchi	200 m breaststroke	2:10.17	5 Q	2:10.00	7 Q	2:09.57	7
Takuro Fujii; Kenta Ito; Kenji Kobase; Shinri Shioura	4×100 m freestyle relay	3:15.46	8 Q	—		3:14.75	8
Kosuke Hagino; Yuki Kobori; Takeshi Matsuda; Daiya Seto*; Sho Sotodate	4×200 m freestyle relay	7:09.98	3 Q	—		7:04.95	5
Takuro Fujii; Ryosuke Irie; Kosuke Kitajima; Shinri Shioura	4×100 m medley relay	3:34.25	5 Q	—		3:32.26	3rd place, bronze medalist(s)

Women

Athlete	Event	Heat		Semifinal		Final	
Athlete	Event	Time	Rank	Time	Rank	Time	Rank
Sayaka Akase	100 m backstroke	1:02.51	28	Did not advance			
Sayaka Akase	200 m backstroke	2:10.87	13 Q	2:11.48	13	Did not advance	
Natsumi Hoshi	100 m butterfly	59.18	=16 Q*	59.42	16	Did not advance	
Natsumi Hoshi	200 m butterfly	2:07.59	3 Q	2:07.18	=4 Q	2:06.09	4
Chihiro Igarashi	200 m freestyle	1:59.00	17	Did not advance			
Chihiro Igarashi	400 m freestyle	4:12.44	15	—		Did not advance	
Rie Kaneto	50 m breaststroke	32.37	34	Did not advance			
Rie Kaneto	200 m breaststroke	2:23.91	4 Q	2:23.28	5 Q	2:22.96	4
Yayoi Matsumoto	50 m freestyle	25.69	25	Did not advance			
Miyu Otsuka	200 m backstroke	2:11.69	14 Q	2:11.68	14	Did not advance	
Miyu Otsuka	400 m individual medley	4:37.77	8 Q	—		4:39.21	8
Satomi Suzuki	50 m breaststroke	DNS		Did not advance			
Satomi Suzuki	100 m breaststroke	1:07.79	11 Q	1:07.83	12	Did not advance	
Satomi Suzuki	200 m breaststroke	2:27.31	11 Q	2:25.77	11	Did not advance	
Miho Takahashi	400 m individual medley	4:45.70	18	—		Did not advance	
Aya Terakawa	50 m backstroke	28.05	3 Q	27.70	2 Q	27.53	3rd place, bronze medalist(s)
Aya Terakawa	100 m backstroke	1:00.09	7 Q	59.80	4 Q	59.23	3rd place, bronze medalist(s)
Miho Teramura	200 m individual medley	2:12.91	12 Q	2:14.02	14	Did not advance	
Haruka Ueda	100 m freestyle	55.78	28	Did not advance			
Kanako Watanabe	100 m breaststroke	1:09.28	26	Did not advance			
Kanako Watanabe	200 m individual medley	2:12.28	9 Q	2:11.50	11	Did not advance	
Yayoi Matsumoto; Miki Uchida; Haruka Ueda; Misaki Yamaguchi	4×100 m freestyle relay	3:39.24	8 Q	—		3:39.45	7
Chihiro Igarashi; Yasuko Miyamoto; Aya Takano; Haruka Ueda	4×200 m freestyle relay	7:56.98	7 Q	—		7:58.15	8
Natsumi Hoshi; Satomi Suzuki; Aya Terakawa; Haruka Ueda	4×100 m medley relay	4:00.18	5 Q	—		3:58.06	5

== Synchronized swimming ==
Japan qualified 11 quota places for each of the following synchronized swimming events.

Athlete	Event	Preliminaries		Final	
Athlete	Event	Points	Rank	Points	Rank
Yukiko Inui	Solo free routine	91.570	5 Q	91.600	5
Yukiko Inui	Solo technical routine	91.800	5 Q	91.900	5
Yumi Adachi; Yukiko Inui	Duet free routine	91.470	5 Q	91.620	5
Yumi Adachi; Yukiko Inui	Duet technical routine	90.400	5 Q	91.700	5
Yumi Adachi; Aika Hakoyama; Mayo Itoyama; Hikaru Kazumori; Risako Mitsui; Kanami Nagamaki; Mai Nakamura; Misa Sugiyama	Team free routine	91.670	4 Q	91.950	4
Yumi Adachi; Miho Arai; Aika Hakoyama; Yukiko Inui; Mayo Itoyama; Risako Mitsui; Kanami Nagamaki; Mai Nakamura	Team technical routine	92.200	4 Q	92.200	4
Yumi Adachi; Miho Arai; Aika Hakoyama; Yukiko Inui; Mayo Itoyama; Hikaru Kazumori; Risako Mitsui; Kanami Nagamaki; Mai Nakamura; Misa Sugiyama; Kurumi Yoshida	Free routine combination	91.590	4 Q	92.020	4
