= High diving at the 2013 World Aquatics Championships =

The high diving portion of the 2013 World Aquatics Championships was held from 29–31 July 2013 at the Port Vell in Barcelona, Spain.

== Events ==
The men's competition was contested in five, the women's competition in three rounds.

== Schedule ==
Date	Time	Round
29 July 2013	16:00	Men's round 1 and 2
30 July 2013	16:00	Women's final
31 July 2013	16:00	Men's final

== Medal summary ==
=== Medal table ===
* Host nation

Rank	Nation	Gold	Silver	Bronze	Total
1	United States	1	1	0	2
2	Colombia	1	0	0	1
3	Great Britain	0	1	0	1
4	Germany	0	0	1	1
4	Mexico	0	0	1	1
Totals (5 entries)		2	2	2	6

=== Medal events ===
Event	Gold		Silver		Bronze	
Men	Orlando Duque; Colombia	590.20	Gary Hunt; Great Britain	589.30	Jonathan Paredes; Mexico	578.35
Women	Cesilie Carlton; United States	211.60	Ginger Huber; United States	206.70	Anna Bader; Germany	203.90
