= Great Britain at the 2013 World Aquatics Championships =

- Flag of Great Britain
- World Aquatics code: GBR
- National federation: British Swimming
- Website: www.swimming.org/britishswimming

in Barcelona, Spain
- Medals Ranked 23rd: Gold 0 Silver 1 Bronze 1 Total 2

World Aquatics Championships appearances
- 1973; 1975; 1978; 1982; 1986; 1991; 1994; 1998; 2001; 2003; 2005; 2007; 2009; 2011; 2013; 2015; 2017; 2019; 2022; 2023; 2024; 2025

Great Britain competed at the 2013 World Aquatics Championships in Barcelona, Spain from 19 July to 4 August 2013.

== Medalists ==
Medal	Name	Sport	Event	Date
Silver	Gary Hunt	High diving	Men's high diving	31 July
Bronze	Francesca Halsall	Swimming	Women's 50 m freestyle	4 August

== Diving ==
Men

Athlete	Event	Preliminaries		Semifinals		Final	
Athlete	Event	Points	Rank	Points	Rank	Points	Rank
Jack Laugher	1 m springboard	327.20	19	—		did not advance	
Chris Mears	1 m springboard	333.30	16	—		did not advance	
Jack Laugher	3 m springboard	471.85	1 Q	405.10	16	did not advance	
Chris Mears	3 m springboard	348.15	31	did not advance			
Tom Daley	10 m platform	406.40	13 Q	452.70	7 Q	470.60	6
Daniel Goodfellow	10 m platform	318.55	28	did not advance			
Chris Mears; Nick Robinson-Baker	3 m synchronised springboard	388.92	7 Q	—		391.53	8

Women

Athlete	Event	Preliminaries		Semifinals		Final	
Athlete	Event	Points	Rank	Points	Rank	Points	Rank
Alicia Blagg	1 m springboard	205.00	34	—		did not advance	
Hannah Starling	1 m springboard	224.75	19	—		did not advance	
Alicia Blagg	3 m springboard	297.75	8 Q	353.80	18	did not advance	
Hannah Starling	3 m springboard	310.90	4 Q	297.35	12 Q	326.20	7
Sarah Barrow	10 m platform	309.00	10 Q	316.05	6 Q	346.45	4
Tonia Couch	10 m platform	317.25	8 Q	368.15	2 Q	311.00	9
Alicia Blagg; Rebecca Gallantree	3 m synchronised springboard	281.01	6 Q	—		284.73	6
Sarah Barrow; Tonia Couch	10 m synchronised platform	306.54	6 Q	—		309.72	5

== High diving ==
Great Britain has qualified three high divers.

Athlete	Event	Points	Rank
Blake Aldridge	Men's high diving	443.20	10
Matthew Cowen	Men's high diving	539.60	5
Gary Hunt	Men's high diving	589.30	2nd place, silver medalist(s)

== Open water swimming ==
Great Britain has qualified the following open water swimmers.

Athlete	Event	Time	Rank
Jack Burnell	Men's 10 km	1:49:30.6	15
Daniel Fogg	Men's 10 km	1:50:29.0	38
Danielle Huskisson	Women's 10 km	2:01:31.5	33
Keri-Anne Payne	Women's 10 km	1:58:25.8	14

== Swimming ==
Swimmers from Great Britain earned qualifying standards in the following events (up to a maximum of 2 swimmers in each event at the A-standard entry time, and 1 at the B-standard): A total of 27 swimmers (16 men and 11 women) were selected to the team.

Men

Athlete	Event	Heat		Semifinal		Final	
Athlete	Event	Time	Rank	Time	Rank	Time	Rank
Adam Brown	50 m freestyle	22.30	17	did not advance			
Adam Brown	100 m freestyle	49.39	16 Q	48.48	9	did not advance	
Daniel Fogg	800 m freestyle	1:56.62	12	—		did not advance	
Daniel Fogg	1500 m freestyle	15:00.48	8 Q	—		15:05.92	8
James Guy	400 m freestyle	3:47.86	8 Q	—		3:47.96	5
Michael Jamieson	100 m breaststroke	1:00.20	12 Q	1:00.59	15	did not advance	
Michael Jamieson	200 m breaststroke	2:11.47	14 Q	2:09.62	5 Q	2:09.14	5
Ieuan Lloyd	200 m freestyle	1:48.92	22	did not advance			
Ieuan Lloyd	200 m individual medley	2:00.65	22	did not advance			
Craig McNally	200 m backstroke	1:57.18	2 Q	1:56.97	7 Q	1:55.67	6
Ross Murdoch	50 m breaststroke	28.00	30	did not advance			
Ross Murdoch	100 m breaststroke	1:00.08	9 Q	1:00.07	11	did not advance	
Roberto Pavoni	200 m butterfly	1:57.37	16 Q	1:57.60	16	did not advance	
Roberto Pavoni	200 m individual medley	1:59.41	14 Q	1:59.44	11	did not advance	
Roberto Pavoni	400 m individual medley	4:15.90	9	—		did not advance	
Benjamin Proud	50 m freestyle	22.31	18	did not advance			
Benjamin Proud	50 m butterfly	23.50	15 Q	23.33	11	did not advance	
Robbie Renwick	200 m freestyle	1:46.88	1 Q	1:46.95	4 Q	1:46.52	6
Robbie Renwick	400 m freestyle	3:47.99	9	—		did not advance	
Michael Rock	100 m butterfly	52.13	10 Q	52.55	16	did not advance	
Daniel Wallace	400 m individual medley	4:14.15	6 Q	—		4:13.72	7
Chris Walker-Hebborn	100 m backstroke	54.23	12 Q	53.96	12	did not advance	
Chris Walker-Hebborn	200 m backstroke	1:57.95	9 Q	1:58.16	13	did not advance	
Andrew Willis	200 m breaststroke	2:09.91	2 Q	2:09.11	3 Q	2:09.13	4
James Guy; Robbie Renwick; Ieuan Lloyd*; Jak Scott; Josh Walsh	4 × 200 m freestyle relay	7:13.00	7 Q	—		7:12.00	8
Adam Brown; Ross Murdoch; Michael Rock; Chris Walker-Hebborn	4 × 100 m medley relay	3:35.23	9	—		did not advance	

Women

Athlete	Event	Heat		Semifinal		Final	
Athlete	Event	Time	Rank	Time	Rank	Time	Rank
Sophie Allen	100 m breaststroke	1:08.62	22	did not advance			
Sophie Allen	200 m individual medley	2:12.31	10 Q	2:10.23	4 Q	2:11.32	7
Jazmin Carlin	400 m freestyle	4:04.85	3 Q	—		4:04.03	4
Jazmin Carlin	800 m freestyle	8:27.48	9	—		did not advance	
Jazmin Carlin	1500 m freestyle	16:06.46	9	—		did not advance	
Georgia Davies	50 m backstroke	28.35	7 Q	28.05	8 Q	27.96	6
Georgia Davies	100 m backstroke	1:01.61	19	did not advance			
Eleanor Faulkner	200 m freestyle	2:00.56	25	did not advance			
Eleanor Faulkner	400 m freestyle	4:13.18	17	—		did not advance	
Eleanor Faulkner	800 m freestyle	8:36.04	17	—		did not advance	
Francesca Halsall	50 m freestyle	24.60	2 Q	24.61	4 Q	24.30	3rd place, bronze medalist(s)
Francesca Halsall	50 m butterfly	25.69	=1 Q	25.90	3 Q	25.70	4
Jemma Lowe	100 m butterfly	58.38	9 Q	58.46	9	did not advance	
Jemma Lowe	200 m butterfly	2:10.21	12 Q	2:08.53	13	did not advance	
Hannah Miley	200 m breaststroke	2:28.15	17	did not advance			
Hannah Miley	400 m individual medley	4:34.94	5 Q	—		4:34.16	5
Siobhan-Marie O'Connor	50 m butterfly	26.98	27	did not advance			
Siobhan-Marie O'Connor	200 m individual medley	2:11.64	6 Q	2:11.33	9 Q	2:12.03	8
Lauren Quigley	50 m backstroke	28.35	7 Q	28.02	7 Q	28.33	8
Lauren Quigley	100 m backstroke	1:01.23	15 Q	1:00.96	12	did not advance	
Lauren Quigley	200 m backstroke	2:14.27	25	did not advance			
Amy Smith	50 m freestyle	25.37	19	did not advance			
Amy Smith	100 m freestyle	55.40	21	did not advance			
Aimee Willmott	400 m individual medley	4:38.43	9	—		did not advance	
Sophie Allen; Francesca Halsall; Jemma Lowe; Lauren Quigley; Amy Smith*	4 × 100 m medley relay	4:00.04	4 Q	—		3:58.67	5

== Synchronized swimming ==
Great Britain has qualified the following synchronized swimmers.

Athlete	Event	Preliminaries		Final	
Athlete	Event	Points	Rank	Points	Rank
Jenna Randall	Solo free routine	87.970	9 Q	87.590	8
Jenna Randall	Solo technical routine	87.500	10 Q	87.500	9
Olivia Federici; Jenna Randall	Duet free routine	87.680	9 Q	87.180	9
Olivia Federici; Jenna Randall	Duet technical routine	87.700	8 Q	87.800	8
Yvette Baker; Lucy Bowes; Amy Campbell; Katie Clark; Jodie Cowie; Vicki Lucass; Asha Randall; Genevieve Randall; Hannah Randall; Samantha Wilson	Team free routine	82.510	11 Q	82.570	11

== Water polo ==
=== Women's tournament ===
Team roster

- Rosemary Morris
- Chloe Wilcox
- Fiona McCann
- Ciara Gibson-Byrne
- Aine Hoy
- Claire Nixon
- Lisa Gibson
- Hazel Musgrove
- Peggy Etiebet
- Angela Winstanley-Smith
- Francesca Clayton
- Kathryn Fowler
- Jade Smith

Group play

	Pld	W	D	L	GF	GA	GD	Pts
United States	3	3	0	0	38	20	+18	6
Canada	3	1	1	1	30	27	+3	3
Greece	3	1	1	1	29	27	+2	3
Great Britain	3	0	0	3	20	43	−23	0

21 July 2013; 17:30	Report	Canada	14–9	Great Britain	Piscines Bernat Picornell, Barcelona; Attendance: 300; Referees: Flahive (AUS), Moller (ARG)
21 July 2013; 17:30	Report	Score by quarters: 3–2, 4–3, 4–3, 3–1			Piscines Bernat Picornell, Barcelona; Attendance: 300; Referees: Flahive (AUS), Moller (ARG)
21 July 2013; 17:30	Report	Alogbo 4	Goals	Gibson-Byrne 4	Piscines Bernat Picornell, Barcelona; Attendance: 300; Referees: Flahive (AUS), Moller (ARG)

23 July 2013; 12:10	Report	Great Britain	7–13	Greece	Piscines Bernat Picornell, Barcelona; Attendance: 255; Referees: Reemnet (NED), Skovpina (UZB)
23 July 2013; 12:10	Report	Score by quarters: 1–1, 2–2, 2–5, 2–5			Piscines Bernat Picornell, Barcelona; Attendance: 255; Referees: Reemnet (NED), Skovpina (UZB)
23 July 2013; 12:10	Report	Gibson-Byrne, Gibson 2	Goals	Asimaki 5	Piscines Bernat Picornell, Barcelona; Attendance: 255; Referees: Reemnet (NED), Skovpina (UZB)

25 July 2013; 09:30	Report	United States	16–4	Great Britain	Piscines Bernat Picornell, Barcelona; Attendance: 500; Referees: Melliar (RSA), Flahive (AUS)
25 July 2013; 09:30	Report	Score by quarters: 4–0, 2–2, 3–1, 7–1			Piscines Bernat Picornell, Barcelona; Attendance: 500; Referees: Melliar (RSA), Flahive (AUS)
25 July 2013; 09:30	Report	Clark 3	Goals	Gibson-Byrne 2	Piscines Bernat Picornell, Barcelona; Attendance: 500; Referees: Melliar (RSA), Flahive (AUS)

Round of 16

27 July 2013; 20:10	Report	Hungary	14–5	Great Britain	Piscines Bernat Picornell, Barcelona; Attendance: 450; Referees: Terepenka (CAN), Drury (USA)
27 July 2013; 20:10	Report	Score by quarters: 4–2, 4–2, 2–0, 4–1			Piscines Bernat Picornell, Barcelona; Attendance: 450; Referees: Terepenka (CAN), Drury (USA)
27 July 2013; 20:10	Report	Bujka 5	Goals	Nixon 2	Piscines Bernat Picornell, Barcelona; Attendance: 450; Referees: Terepenka (CAN), Drury (USA)
