= Swimming at the 2013 World Aquatics Championships – Women's 50 metre freestyle =

Women's 50 metre freestyle at the 2013 World Aquatics Championships
- Venue: Palau Sant Jordi
- Dates: August 3, 2013 (heats & semifinals); August 4, 2013 (final)
- Competitors: 83 from 74 nations
- Winning time: 24.05

Medalists
gold medal	Ranomi Kromowidjojo	Netherlands
silver medal	Cate Campbell	Australia
bronze medal	Francesca Halsall	Great Britain

Barcelona Palau San Jordi

The women's 50 metre freestyle event in swimming at the 2013 World Aquatics Championships took place on 3–4 August at the Palau Sant Jordi in Barcelona, Spain.

== Records ==
Prior to this competition, the existing world and championship records were:

World record	Britta Steffen (GER)	23.73	Rome, Italy	2 August 2009
Competition record	Britta Steffen (GER)	23.73	Rome, Italy	2 August 2009

== Results ==
=== Heats ===
The heats were held at 10:00.

Rank	Heat	Lane	Name	Nationality	Time	Notes
1	8	4	Cate Campbell	Australia	24.27	Q
2	7	4	Francesca Halsall	Great Britain	24.60	Q
3	8	5	Bronte Campbell	Australia	24.65	Q
4	9	4	Ranomi Kromowidjojo	Netherlands	24.68	Q
5	9	5	Dorothea Brandt	Germany	24.78	Q
6	7	7	Chantal van Landeghem	Canada	24.89	Q
7	7	6	Simone Manuel	United States	24.93	Q
8	9	3	Sarah Sjöström	Sweden	24.99	Q
9	9	6	Natalie Coughlin	United States	25.00	Q
10	9	7	Victoria Poon	Canada	25.01	Q
10	9	8	Aleksandra Urbańczyk	Poland	25.01	Q, NR
12	8	3	Jeanette Ottesen	Denmark	25.04	Q
13	7	5	Arianna Vanderpool-Wallace	Bahamas	25.15	Q
14	8	6	Femke Heemskerk	Netherlands	25.19	Q
15	9	9	Hanna-Maria Seppälä	Finland	25.20	Q
16	8	8	Pernille Blume	Denmark	25.23	Q
17	7	8	Silvia di Pietro	Italy	25.24	
18	9	2	Graciele Herrmann	Brazil	25.32	
19	7	3	Amy Smith	Great Britain	25.37	
20	6	5	Liliana Ibáñez	Mexico	25.51	NR
21	8	9	Yuliya Khitraya	Belarus	25.56	
22	7	2	Svetlana Kniaginina	Russia	25.59	
23	6	7	Miroslava Najdanovski	Serbia	25.63	
24	9	1	Alessandra Marchioro	Brazil	25.68	
25	9	0	Yayoi Matsumoto	Japan	25.69	
26	8	7	Tang Yi	China	25.72	
27	7	9	Julie Meynen	Luxembourg	25.74	
28	5	5	Chinyere Pigot	Suriname	25.83	NR
29	6	6	Amanda Lim	Singapore	25.86	
30	7	1	Yin Fan	China	25.87	
30	8	2	Theodora Drakou	Greece	25.87	
32	6	8	Ingibjörg Jónsdóttir	Iceland	25.88	
33	8	0	Trudi Maree	South Africa	26.02	
34	6	2	Susann Bjørnsen	Norway	26.09	
35	6	0	Carolina Colorado Henao	Colombia	26.18	
36	6	1	Elmira Aigaliyeva	Kazakhstan	26.22	
37	8	1	Daniela Schreiber	Germany	26.24	
38	5	7	Allyson Ponson	Aruba	26.27	
39	5	4	Gabriela Ņikitina	Latvia	26.31	
40	5	6	Lei On Kei	Macau	26.33	
41	5	3	Yamilé Bahamonde	Ecuador	26.46	
42	6	3	Sabina Dostálová	Czech Republic	26.57	
43	5	9	Karen Torrez	Bolivia	26.69	
44	4	5	Sylvia Brunlehner	Kenya	26.73	NR
45	5	8	Rebecca Heyliger	Bermuda	26.86	
46	5	2	Anastasia Bogdanovski	North Macedonia	26.93	
47	4	4	Bayan Jumah	Syria	26.94	NR
48	4	7	Faye Sultan	Kuwait	27.25	NR
49	5	1	Karen Riveros	Paraguay	27.36	
50	4	3	Monika Vasilyan	Armenia	27.50	
51	4	6	Kimiko Raheem	Sri Lanka	27.87	
52	3	8	Ophelia Swayne	Ghana	28.10	
53	4	9	Pilar Shimizu	Guam	28.14	
54	4	8	Irene Prescott	Tonga	28.19	
55	6	9	Sabine Hazboun	Palestine	28.29	
56	4	2	Mónica Ramírez	Andorra	28.35	
57	3	4	Brittany van Lange	Guyana	28.46	
58	4	1	Anxhela Kashari	Albania	28.48	
59	3	1	Felicity Passon	Seychelles	28.62	
60	3	9	Yara Lima	Angola	28.69	
61	3	6	Tiara Shahril	Brunei	28.74	
62	4	0	Tilka Paljk	Zambia	29.05	
63	2	1	Colleen Furgeson	Marshall Islands	29.09	
64	3	7	Deandra van der Colff	Botswana	29.27	
65	1	9	Merjen Saryyeva	Turkmenistan	29.63	NR
66	3	3	Mariam Foum	Tanzania	29.86	
67	3	0	Sameera Al-Bitar	Bahrain	29.88	
68	3	2	Khadidiatou Dieng	Senegal	29.89	
69	2	7	Rachel Wall	Antigua and Barbuda	30.14	
70	2	8	Sofia Shah	Nepal	30.16	
71	2	5	Dirngulbai Misech	Palau	30.22	
72	2	2	Alphonsine Agahozo	Rwanda	30.66	
73	2	6	Angel de Jesus	Northern Mariana Islands	31.01	
74	2	3	Hemthon Vitiny	Cambodia	31.05	
75	2	4	Aminath Shajan	Maldives	31.52	
76	2	0	Angelika Ouedraogo	Burkina Faso	31.68	
77	1	4	Karina Klimyk	Tajikistan	32.42	
78	2	9	Danisha Paul	Federated States of Micronesia	34.29	
79	1	7	Haoua Sangare	Mali	34.49	
80	1	3	Elsie Uwamahoro	Burundi	34.80	
81	1	6	Mhasin El Nour Fadlalla	Sudan	36.20	
82	1	2	Nazlati Mohamed Andhumdine	Comoros	38.45	
83	1	0	Charmel Sogbadji	Benin	42.13	
	1	8	Alexandra Wilman	Central African Republic		DNS
	1	5	Stephane Sangala	Congo		DNS
	1	1	Adzo Kpossi	Togo		DNS
	3	5	Khahliso Mpeta	Lesotho		DNS
	5	0	Miriam Corsini	Mozambique		DNS
	6	4	Farida Osman	Egypt		DNS
	7	0	Rūta Meilutytė	Lithuania		DNS

=== Semifinals ===
The semifinals were held at 18:58.

==== Semifinal 1 ====
Rank	Lane	Name	Nationality	Time	Notes
1	5	Ranomi Kromowidjojo	Netherlands	24.33	Q
2	7	Jeanette Ottesen	Denmark	24.54	Q
3	4	Francesca Halsall	Great Britain	24.61	Q
4	6	Sarah Sjöström	Sweden	24.65	Q
5	3	Chantal van Landeghem	Canada	24.96	
6	8	Pernille Blume	Denmark	25.01	
7	1	Femke Heemskerk	Netherlands	25.10	
8	2	Victoria Poon	Canada	25.42	

==== Semifinal 2 ====
Rank	Lane	Name	Nationality	Time	Notes
1	4	Cate Campbell	Australia	24.19	Q, WL
2	5	Bronte Campbell	Australia	24.62	Q
3	3	Dorothea Brandt	Germany	24.85	Q
4	6	Simone Manuel	United States	24.91	Q
5	2	Natalie Coughlin	United States	25.02	
6	7	Aleksandra Urbańczyk	Poland	25.03	
7	8	Hanna-Maria Seppälä	Finland	25.06	=NR
8	1	Arianna Vanderpool-Wallace	Bahamas	25.24	

=== Final ===
The final was held at 18:32.

Rank	Lane	Name	Nationality	Time	Notes
1st place, gold medalist(s)	5	Ranomi Kromowidjojo	Netherlands	24.05	WL
2nd place, silver medalist(s)	4	Cate Campbell	Australia	24.14	
3rd place, bronze medalist(s)	6	Francesca Halsall	Great Britain	24.30	
4	7	Sarah Sjöström	Sweden	24.45	
5	2	Bronte Campbell	Australia	24.66	
5	3	Jeanette Ottesen	Denmark	24.66	
7	8	Simone Manuel	United States	24.80	
8	1	Dorothea Brandt	Germany	24.81	
