= Swimming at the 2013 World Aquatics Championships – Men's 100 metre butterfly =

Men's 100 metre butterfly at the 2013 World Aquatics Championships
- Venue: Palau Sant Jordi
- Dates: August 2, 2013 (heats & semifinals); August 3, 2013 (final)
- Competitors: 57 from 49 nations
- Winning time: 51.06

Medalists
gold medal	Chad le Clos	South Africa
silver medal	László Cseh	Hungary
bronze medal	Konrad Czerniak	Poland

Barcelona Palau San Jordi

The men's 100 metre butterfly event in swimming at the 2013 World Aquatics Championships took place on 2–3 August at the Palau Sant Jordi in Barcelona, Spain.

== Records ==
Prior to this competition, the existing world and championship records were:

World record	Michael Phelps (USA)	49.82	Rome, Italy	1 August 2009
Competition record	Michael Phelps (USA)	49.82	Rome, Italy	1 August 2009

== Results ==
=== Heats ===
The heats were held at 10:39.

Rank	Heat	Lane	Name	Nationality	Time	Notes
1	4	4	Yevgeny Korotyshkin	Russia	51.55	Q
2	5	4	Chad le Clos	South Africa	51.88	Q
3	6	8	László Cseh	Hungary	51.89	Q
4	5	7	Ivan Lenđer	Serbia	51.95	Q
5	5	5	Matteo Rivolta	Italy	52.00	Q
6	4	6	Yauhen Tsurkin	Belarus	52.03	Q, NR
7	6	4	Steffen Deibler	Germany	52.07	Q
8	5	6	Nikolay Skvortsov	Russia	52.09	Q
9	5	3	Konrad Czerniak	Poland	52.12	Q
10	6	6	Michael Rock	Great Britain	52.13	Q
11	4	3	Paweł Korzeniowski	Poland	52.16	Q
12	5	0	Thiago Pereira	Brazil	52.23	Q
13	4	5	Ryan Lochte	United States	52.26	Q
14	6	5	Eugene Godsoe	United States	52.38	Q
15	5	2	Takuro Fujii	Japan	52.50	Q
16	6	7	Philip Heintz	Germany	52.52	Q
17	4	7	Joseph Schooling	Singapore	52.56	
18	5	8	Francois Heersbrandt	Belgium	52.75	
19	4	2	Tommaso D'Orsogna	Australia	52.82	
20	6	3	Chris Wright	Australia	52.83	
21	5	1	Pavel Sankovich	Belarus	52.87	
22	3	6	Mario Todorović	Croatia	52.92	
23	4	8	Rafael Muñoz	Spain	52.94	
24	6	2	Bence Pulai	Hungary	52.98	
25	6	1	Yuki Kobori	Japan	53.11	
25	6	0	Mauricio Fiol	Peru	53.11	
27	6	9	Benjamin Hockin	Paraguay	53.28	
28	3	5	Alexandru Coci	Romania	53.34	
29	3	3	Coleman Allen	Canada	53.53	
30	4	1	Mehdy Metella	France	53.77	
31	5	9	Simao Morgado	Portugal	53.83	
32	3	4	Dominik Meichtry	Switzerland	53.96	
33	3	2	Tadas Duskinas	Lithuania	53.97	
34	4	0	Chang Gyu-Cheol	South Korea	54.09	
35	3	7	Yevgeniy Lazuka	Azerbaijan	54.29	
36	3	1	Liu Weijia	China	54.37	
37	3	9	Marwan Adel	Egypt	54.39	
38	3	0	Martin Zikmund	Czech Republic	54.63	
39	2	7	Ricardo Yee	Panama	55.82	
40	2	1	Jessie Lacuna	Philippines	55.92	
41	2	6	Joshua McLeod	Trinidad and Tobago	56.06	
42	2	2	Tyrone Alvarado	Ecuador	56.27	
43	2	3	Ifalemi Sau-Paea	Tonga	56.32	
44	2	4	Alexandre Bakhtiarov	Cyprus	56.38	
45	3	8	Yousef Al-Askari	Kuwait	56.40	
46	1	6	Anthony Ralefy	Madagascar	56.48	
46	2	5	Ayman Klzie	Syria	56.48	
48	1	4	Christopher Clark	French Polynesia	56.50	
49	1	3	Ralph Goveia	Zambia	57.66	
50	2	0	Sofyan El Gadi	Libya	57.79	
51	2	8	Afshin Asgari	Iran	59.29	
52	2	9	Ameer Ali	Iraq	59.81	
53	1	2	Oumar Toure	Mali	59.86	
54	1	1	Stanford Kawale	Papua New Guinea	1:02.42	
55	1	7	Kensuke Kimura	Northern Mariana Islands	1:02.79	
56	1	9	Sylla Alassane	Ivory Coast	1:03.49	
57	1	8	Haris Bandey	Pakistan	1:06.03	
	1	0	Abdulrahman Al-Ishaq	Qatar		DNS
	1	5	Nuno Miguel Rola	Angola		DNS
	4	9	Simon Sjödin	Sweden		DNS

=== Semifinals ===
The semifinals were held at 19:04.

==== Semifinal 1 ====
Rank	Lane	Name	Nationality	Time	Notes
1	4	Chad le Clos	South Africa	51.52	Q
2	3	Yauhen Tsurkin	Belarus	51.78	Q, NR
3	6	Nikolay Skvortsov	Russia	51.86	
4	1	Eugene Godsoe	United States	51.96	
5	5	Ivan Lenđer	Serbia	52.10	
6	8	Philip Heintz	Germany	52.37	
7	7	Thiago Pereira	Brazil	52.43	
8	2	Michael Rock	Great Britain	52.55	

==== Semifinal 2 ====
Rank	Lane	Name	Nationality	Time	Notes
1	1	Ryan Lochte	United States	51.48	Q
2	2	Konrad Czerniak	Poland	51.55	Q
3	4	Yevgeny Korotyshkin	Russia	51.60	Q
4	5	László Cseh	Hungary	51.61	Q, NR
5	3	Matteo Rivolta	Italy	51.64	Q, NR
6	6	Steffen Deibler	Germany	51.65	Q
7	7	Paweł Korzeniowski	Poland	51.85	
8	8	Takuro Fujii	Japan	52.27	

=== Final ===
The final was held at 18:43.

Rank	Lane	Name	Nationality	Time	Notes
1st place, gold medalist(s)	5	Chad le Clos	South Africa	51.06	NR
2nd place, silver medalist(s)	2	László Cseh	Hungary	51.45	NR
3rd place, bronze medalist(s)	3	Konrad Czerniak	Poland	51.46	
4	1	Steffen Deibler	Germany	51.54	
5	6	Yevgeny Korotyshkin	Russia	51.57	
6	4	Ryan Lochte	United States	51.58	
7	7	Matteo Rivolta	Italy	51.65	
7	8	Yauhen Tsurkin	Belarus	51.65	NR
