= Singapore at the 2013 World Aquatics Championships =

- Flag of Singapore
- FINA code: SIN
- National federation: Singapore Swimming Association
- Website: www.swimming.org.sg

in Barcelona, Spain
- Competitors: 15 in 2 sports
- Medals: Gold 0 Silver 0 Bronze 0 Total 0

World Aquatics Championships appearances
- 1973; 1975; 1978; 1982; 1986; 1991; 1994; 1998; 2001; 2003; 2005; 2007; 2009; 2011; 2013; 2015; 2017; 2019; 2022; 2023; 2024

Singapore is competing at the 2013 World Aquatics Championships in Barcelona, Spain between 19 July and 4 August 2013.

== Swimming ==
Singaporean swimmers achieved qualifying standards in the following events (up to a maximum of 2 swimmers in each event at the A-standard entry time, and 1 at the B-standard):

Men

| Athlete | Event | Heat | | Semifinal | | Final | |
| Athlete | Event | Time | Rank | Time | Rank | Time | Rank |
|---|---|---|---|---|---|---|---|
| Joseph Schooling | 200 m freestyle | 1:50.15 | 34 | did not advance | | | |
| Joseph Schooling | 100 m butterfly | 52.56 | 17 | did not advance | | | |
| Joseph Schooling | 200 m butterfly | 1:57.23 | 14 Q | 1:56.27 NR | 10 | did not advance | |
| Joseph Schooling | 200 m individual medley | 1:59.99 NR | 16 Q | 2:00.49 | 16 | did not advance | |
| Danny Yeo | 100 m freestyle | 50.92 | 40 | did not advance | | | |

Women

| Athlete | Event | Heat | | Semifinal | | Final | |
| Athlete | Event | Time | Rank | Time | Rank | Time | Rank |
|---|---|---|---|---|---|---|---|
| Amanda Lim | 50 m freestyle | 25.86 | 29 | did not advance | | | |
| Lynette Lim | 400 m freestyle | 4:14.76 | 22 | — | | did not advance | |
| Quah Ting Wen | 100 m freestyle | 56.70 | 38 | did not advance | | | |
| Quah Ting Wen | 200 m freestyle | 2:02.57 | 29 | did not advance | | | |
| Quah Ting Wen | 200 m butterfly | 2:14.10 | 21 | did not advance | | | |
| Tao Li | 50 m backstroke | 28.90 | 24 | did not advance | | | |
| Tao Li | 100 m backstroke | 1:03.31 | 33 | did not advance | | | |
| Tao Li | 50 m butterfly | 26.48 | 13 Q | 26.47 | =13 | did not advance | |
| Tao Li | 100 m butterfly | 58.94 | 13 Q | 59.02 | 14 | did not advance | |
| Samantha Yeo | 50 m breaststroke | 32.69 | 37 | did not advance | | | |
| Samantha Yeo | 100 m breaststroke | 1:11.17 | 35 | did not advance | | | |
| Samantha Yeo | 200 m breaststroke | 2:32.55 | 24 | did not advance | | | |
| Samantha Yeo | 200 m individual medley | 2:20.19 | 38 | did not advance | | | |
| Amanda Lim; Lynette Lim; Mylene Ong; Quah Ting Wen | 4 × 100 m freestyle relay | 3:48.85 | 14 | — | | did not advance | |
| Amanda Lim; Lynette Lim; Mylene Ong; Quah Ting Wen | 4 × 200 m freestyle relay | 8:15.91 | 12 | — | | did not advance | |
| Amanda Lim; Quah Ting Wen; Tao Li; Samantha Yeo | 4 × 100 m medley relay | 4:10.69 | 15 | — | | did not advance | |

== Synchronized swimming ==
Singapore has qualified eight synchronized swimmers.

| Athlete | Event | Preliminaries | | Final | |
| Athlete | Event | Points | Rank | Points | Rank |
|---|---|---|---|---|---|
| Mei Qi Stephanie Chen; Yu Hui Crystal Yap | Duet free routine | 69.330 | 31 | did not advance | |
| Mei Qi Stephanie Chen; Yu Hui Crystal Yap | Duet technical routine | 69.800 | 26 | did not advance | |
| Mei Qing Natalie Chen; Mei Qi Stephanie Chen; Wei Ling Geraldine Chew; Mei Yi Melissa Khor; Lee Mei Shuang; Li Yi Shona Lim; Li Fei Debbie Soh; Yu Hui Crystal Yap | Team free routine | 67.960 | 15 | did not advance | |
| Mei Qing Natalie Chen; Mei Qi Stephanie Chen; Wei Ling Geraldine Chew; Mei Yi Melissa Khor; Lee Mei Shuang; Li Yi Shona Lim; Li Fei Debbie Soh; Yu Hui Crystal Yap | Team technical routine | 69.800 | 15 | did not advance | |
