= Swimming at the 2013 World Aquatics Championships – Men's 100 metre freestyle =

Men's 100 metre freestyle at the 2013 World Aquatics Championships
- Venue: Palau Sant Jordi
- Dates: July 31, 2013 (heats & semifinals); August 1, 2013 (final)
- Competitors: 86 from 78 nations
- Winning time: 47.71

Medalists
gold medal	James Magnussen	Australia
silver medal	Jimmy Feigen	United States
bronze medal	Nathan Adrian	United States

Barcelona Palau San Jordi

The men's 100 metre freestyle event in swimming at the 2013 World Aquatics Championships took place on 31 July and 1 August at the Palau Sant Jordi in Barcelona, Spain.

== Records ==
Prior to this competition, the existing world and championship records were:

World record	César Cielo (BRA)	46.91	Rome, Italy	30 July 2009
Competition record	César Cielo (BRA)	46.91	Rome, Italy	30 July 2009

== Results ==
=== Heats ===
The heats were held at 10:13.

Rank	Heat	Lane	Name	Nationality	Time	Notes
1	8	4	James Magnussen	Australia	47.71	Q
2	8	6	Konrad Czerniak	Poland	48.50	Q
3	8	3	Nikita Lobintsev	Russia	48.51	Q
4	7	7	Shinri Shioura	Japan	48.52	Q
5	8	5	Hanser García	Cuba	48.54	Q
6	7	5	Cameron McEvoy	Australia	48.59	Q
7	9	5	Vladimir Morozov	Russia	48.67	Q
8	8	7	Pieter Timmers	Belgium	48.76	Q
9	7	3	Jimmy Feigen	United States	48.86	Q
=10	7	4	Sebastiaan Verschuren	Netherlands	48.88	Q
=10	9	6	Luca Dotto	Italy	48.88	Q
12	9	4	Nathan Adrian	United States	48.93	Q
13	7	6	Filippo Magnini	Italy	49.02	Q
14	9	7	Fabien Gilot	France	49.07	Q
15	9	3	Marcelo Chierighini	Brazil	49.08	Q
16	8	2	Adam Brown	Great Britain	49.39	Q
17	6	7	Yauhen Tsurkin	Belarus	49.41	NR
18	7	9	Cristian Quintero	Venezuela	49.50	
19	9	2	William Meynard	France	49.59	
20	7	1	Norbert Trandafir	Romania	49.60	
=21	8	0	Martin Verner	Czech Republic	49.61	
=21	9	9	Ben Hockin	Paraguay	49.61	NR
23	7	8	Kemal Arda Gürdal	Turkey	49.65	
24	9	8	Krisztián Takács	Hungary	49.70	
25	7	2	Fernando dos Santos	Brazil	49.71	
26	6	8	Mario Todorović	Croatia	49.80	
27	8	9	Oussama Sahnoune	Algeria	49.81	
28	7	0	Aitor Martínez	Spain	49.83	
29	9	1	Lü Zhiwu	China	49.85	
30	6	3	Federico Grabich	Argentina	49.87	
=31	5	5	Geoffrey Cheah	Hong Kong	49.91	
=31	6	4	Mindaugas Sadauskas	Lithuania	49.91	
=31	8	1	Kenta Ito	Japan	49.91	
34	9	0	Leith Shankland	South Africa	50.21	
35	6	2	Pjotr Degtjarjov	Estonia	50.28	
36	8	8	Marco di Carli	Germany	50.38	
37	6	5	Uvis Kalniņš	Latvia	50.51	
38	6	1	Joel Greenshields	Canada	50.54	
39	4	7	Roy-Allan Burch	Bermuda	50.66	NR
40	6	0	Danny Yeo	Singapore	50.92	
41	5	4	Boris Stojanović	Serbia	51.11	
42	5	2	Joshua McLeod	Trinidad and Tobago	51.47	
43	4	9	Allan Gutiérrez Castro	Honduras	51.69	
44	5	0	Wang Yu-lian	Chinese Taipei	51.70	
45	4	3	Enzo Martínez	Uruguay	51.77	
46	5	8	Davit Sikharulidze	Georgia	51.81	
47	4	0	Sean Gunn	Zimbabwe	51.94	NR
48	5	6	Mohammad Madwa	Kuwait	52.06	NR
49	4	5	Jemal Le Grand	Aruba	52.07	
50	5	1	Andrew Chetcuti	Malta	52.08	
51	4	6	Jessie Lacuna	Philippines	52.10	
52	5	3	Triady Fauzi Sidiq	Indonesia	52.11	
53	5	9	Sebastián Jahnsen Madico	Peru	52.20	
54	4	4	Mehdi El Hazzaz	Morocco	52.54	
55	5	7	Kevin Avila Soto	Guatemala	52.56	
56	1	9	Bradley Vincent	Mauritius	52.76	
57	4	2	Andrew Rutherfurd	Bolivia	52.79	
58	3	5	Anthony Clark	French Polynesia	52.87	NR
59	3	6	Arsham Mirzaei	Iran	53.00	
60	3	4	Vahan Mhkitaryan	Armenia	53.06	
61	4	1	Abdoul Niane	Senegal	53.46	
62	6	9	Virdhawal Khade	India	53.47	
63	4	8	Jose Montoya	Costa Rica	53.48	
64	3	3	Esau Simpson	Grenada	53.66	
65	3	2	Joshua Daniel	Saint Lucia	53.69	
66	3	1	Christopher Duenas	Guam	53.88	
67	3	7	Lei Cheok Fong	Macau	54.93	
68	3	8	Ahmed Al-Dulaimi	Iraq	55.13	
69	2	6	Stanford Kawale	Papua New Guinea	55.29	
70	3	0	Sergeý Krowýakow	Turkmenistan	55.41	
71	2	3	Farhan Saleh Faraj Sultan	Bahrain	55.49	
72	2	4	Christian Nikles	Brunei	55.55	=NR
73	2	2	Noah Mascoll-Gomes	Antigua and Barbuda	56.36	
74	2	5	Kalu Achchige	Sri Lanka	56.53	
75	2	7	Gunsennorov Zandanbal	Mongolia	56.78	
76	2	1	Syed Naqvi	Pakistan	58.40	
77	1	4	Giordan Harris	Marshall Islands	58.50	
78	2	9	Ammaar Ghadiyali	Tanzania	59.96	
79	1	6	Kwesi Jackson	Ghana	1:01.25	
80	1	5	Sirish Gurung	Nepal	1:02.12	
81	1	3	Billy-Scott Irakoze	Burundi	1:02.25	
82	1	1	Shawn Dingilius	Palau	1:02.27	
83	1	7	Ibrahima Camara	Guinea	1:02.33	
84	1	2	Robel Habte	Ethiopia	1:02.57	
85	2	8	Phathana Inthavong	Laos	1:02.85	
86	1	8	Wilfried Tevoedjre	Benin	1:07.42	
	3	9	Samson Opuakpo	Nigeria		DSQ
	1	0	Abdulrahman Al-Ishaq	Qatar		DNS
	2	0	Sylla Alassane	Ivory Coast		DNS
	6	6	Croyeb Gailloty	Central African Republic		DNS

=== Semifinals ===
The semifinals were held at 18:02.

==== Semifinal 1 ====
Rank	Lane	Name	Nationality	Time	Notes
1	7	Nathan Adrian	United States	47.95	Q
2	1	Fabien Gilot	France	48.21	Q
3	3	Cameron McEvoy	Australia	48.43	Q
4	8	Adam Brown	Great Britain	48.48	
5	5	Shinri Shioura	Japan	48.51	
6	6	Pieter Timmers	Belgium	48.65	
7	2	Sebastiaan Verschuren	Netherlands	48.73	
8	4	Konrad Czerniak	Poland	48.78	

==== Semifinal 2 ====
Rank	Lane	Name	Nationality	Time	Notes
1	2	Jimmy Feigen	United States	48.07	Q
2	8	Marcelo Chierighini	Brazil	48.11	Q
3	4	James Magnussen	Australia	48.20	Q
3	6	Vladimir Morozov	Russia	48.20	Q
5	7	Luca Dotto	Italy	48.46	Q
6	3	Hanser García	Cuba	48.54	
7	5	Nikita Lobintsev	Russia	48.73	
8	1	Filippo Magnini	Italy	49.12	

=== Final ===
The final was held at 18:33.

Rank	Lane	Name	Nationality	Time	Notes
1st place, gold medalist(s)	6	James Magnussen	Australia	47.71	
2nd place, silver medalist(s)	5	Jimmy Feigen	United States	47.82	
3rd place, bronze medalist(s)	4	Nathan Adrian	United States	47.84	
4	1	Cameron McEvoy	Australia	47.88	
5	2	Vladimir Morozov	Russia	48.01	
6	3	Marcelo Chierighini	Brazil	48.28	
7	7	Fabien Gilot	France	48.33	
8	8	Luca Dotto	Italy	48.58	
