= Joel Swift =

Australian water polo player

Personal information
- Born: 14 June 1990 (age 36) East Fremantle, Australia
- Height: 191 cm (6 ft 3 in)
- Weight: 105 kg (231 lb)

Sport
- Sport: water polo
Medal record
Representing Australia
Summer Universiade
Gold medal – first place	2009 Belgrade	Team competition
- Updated on 19 August 2015

Joel Swift (born 14 June 1990) is a water polo player of Australia. He was part of the Australian team at the 2013 Water Polo World Aquatic Championships 2015 World Aquatics Championships, as well as being part of the team which went to the 2016 Olympics in Rio de Janeiro. Swift is an indigenous Australian.
