= Yury Suvorau =

Belarusian swimmer

Personal information
- Full name: Yury Yurievich Suvorau
- Nationality: Belarus
- Born: 29 March 1991 (age 35) Vitebsk, Byelorussian SSR, Soviet Union
- Height: 1.88 m (6 ft 2 in)
- Weight: 84 kg (185 lb)

Sport
- Sport: Swimming
- Strokes: Individual medley

Yury Yurievich Suvorau (Belarusian: Юрый Юр'евіч Сувораў; born 29 March 1991) is a Belarusian swimmer, who specialized in individual medley events. Suvorau qualified for the men's 400 m individual medley, as a member of the Belarusian swimming team, at the 2012 Summer Olympics in London, by attaining a B-standard entry time of 4:23.35. Suvorau challenged seven other swimmers in the second heat, including two-time Olympian Raphaël Stacchiotti of Luxembourg. He finished the race in a third-place tie with Portugal's Diogo Carvalho, in a new Belarusian record time of 4:23.06. Suvorau, however, failed to advance into the final, as he placed twenty-sixth out of 37 swimmers in the preliminary heats.
