= Tom Luchsinger =

American swimmer

Personal information
- Full name: Thomas James Luchsinger
- Nationality: United States
- Born: February 28, 1991 (age 35) Mount Sinai, New York, U.S.
- Height: 6 ft 2 in (1.88 m)
- Weight: 181 lb (82 kg)

Sport
- Sport: Swimming
- Strokes: Butterfly
- Club: North Baltimore Aquatic Club
- College team: North Carolina Tar Heels
- Coach: Bob Bowman

Thomas James Luchsinger (born February 28, 1991) is an American swimmer who specializes in butterfly events. At the 2013 US national championships, he won the championship title in the 200m butterfly and qualified for the 2013 World Aquatics Championships in Barcelona with a time of 1:55.57. The Atlantic Coast Conference named him Swimmer of the Year in 2013.

Luchsinger attended Mount Sinai High School and graduated from the University of North Carolina in 2013. He came out as gay in an essay in Outsports in December 2014.

== Coaching career ==
Luchsinger currently coaches in the greater New York area with the private coaching service, CoachUp.
