= Dawid Szulich =

Polish swimmer

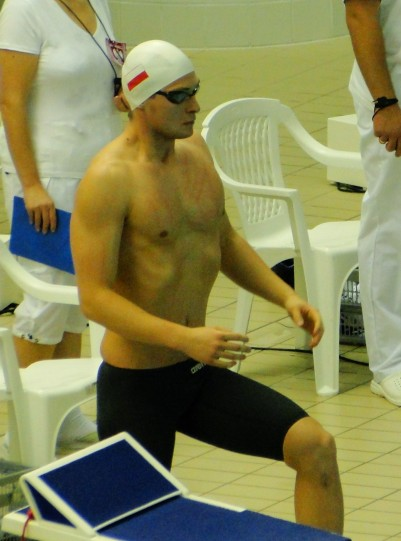

Personal information
- Born: May 19, 1990 (age 36) Warsaw, Poland

Sport
- Sport: Swimming
- Strokes: Breaststroke

Dawid Szulich (born 19 May 1990) is a Polish swimmer. At the 2012 Summer Olympics, he competed in the Men's 100 metre breaststroke, finishing in 32nd place in the heats, failing to reach the semifinals.
