= Swimming at the 2013 World Aquatics Championships – Women's 4 × 100 metre medley relay =

Women's 4 × 100 metre medley relay at the 2013 World Aquatics Championships
- Venue: Palau Sant Jordi
- Dates: August 4, 2013 (heats & final)
- Competitors: 76 from 19 nations
- Winning time: 3:53.23

Medalists
gold medal	Missy Franklin; Jessica Hardy; Dana Vollmer; Megan Romano	United States
silver medal	Emily Seebohm; Sally Foster; Alicia Coutts; Cate Campbell	Australia
bronze medal	Daria Ustinova; Yuliya Yefimova; Svetlana Chimrova; Veronika Popova	Russia

Barcelona Palau San Jordi

The women's 4 × 100 metre medley relay event in swimming at the 2013 World Aquatics Championships took place on 4 August at the Palau Sant Jordi in Barcelona, Spain.

== Records ==
Prior to this competition, the existing world and championship records were:

World record	United States (USA); Missy Franklin (58.50); Rebecca Soni (1:04.82); Dana Vollmer (55.48); Allison Schmitt (53.25)	3:52.05	London, Great Britain	4 August 2012
Competition record	China (CHN); Zhao Jing (58.98); Chen Huijia (1:04.12); Jiao Liuyang (56.28); Li Zhesi (52.81)	3:52.19	Rome, Italy	1 August 2009

== Results ==
=== Heats ===
The heats were held at 11:08.

Rank	Heat	Lane	Name	Nationality	Time	Notes
1	2	4	Elizabeth Pelton (1:00.83); Breeja Larson (1:05.68); Claire Donahue (58.67); Shannon Vreeland (53.48)	United States	3:58.66	Q
2	1	4	Emily Seebohm (58.79); Samantha Marshall (1:07.71); Alicia Coutts (57.22); Emma McKeon (55.01)	Australia	3:58.73	Q
3	2	3	Fu Yuanhui (59.57); Sun Ye (1:07.81); Lu Ying (58.17); Tang Yi (53.84)	China	3:59.39	Q
4	1	3	Lauren Quigley (1:00.32); Sophie Allen (1:07.95); Jemma Lowe (57.85); Amy Smith (53.92)	Great Britain	4:00.04	Q
5	2	5	Aya Terakawa (59.72); Satomi Suzuki (1:07.40); Natsumi Hoshi (58.60); Haruka Ueda (54.46)	Japan	4:00.18	Q
6	2	2	Hilary Caldwell (1:00.47); Martha McCabe (1:08.12); Katerine Savard (57.51); Chantal van Landeghem (54.24)	Canada	4:00.34	Q
7	1	5	Daria Ustinova (1:00.11); Anna Belousova (1:08.32); Svetlana Chimrova (58.27); Veronika Popova (53.99)	Russia	4:00.69	Q
8	2	1	Lisa Graf (1:00.89); Caroline Ruhnau (1:09.06); Alexandra Wenk (58.31); Britta Steffen (53.04)	Germany	4:01.30	Q
9	2	6	Michelle Coleman (1:02.30); Joline Höstman (1:07.89); Sarah Sjöström (57.48); Louise Hansson (55.16)	Sweden	4:02.83	
10	1	2	Duane da Rocha (1:01.03); Marina García (1:07.55); Judit Ignacio Sorribes (59.73); Melanie Costa (55.48)	Spain	4:03.79	
11	1	1	Jessica Ashley-Cooper (1:01.84); Tara-Lynn Nicholas (1:09.48); Marne Erasmus (1:00.51); Karin Prinsloo (54.63)	South Africa	4:06.46	
12	1	8	Etiene Medeiros (1:02.06); Beatriz Travalon (1:10.29); Daynara de Paula (59.70); Larissa Oliveira (54.86)	Brazil	4:06.91	
13	2	9	Fernanda González (1:01.91); Erica Dittmer (1:10.79); Rita Medrano (1:00.34); Liliana Ibáñez (55.78)	Mexico	4:08.82	NR
14	1	0	Anni Alitalo (1:03.78); Jenna Laukkanen (1:08.49); Tanja Kylliäinen (1:02.42); Hanna-Maria Seppälä (54.41)	Finland	4:09.10	
15	1	7	Tao Li (1:03.44); Samantha Yeo (1:11.05); Quah Ting Wen (59.70); Amanda Lim (56.50)	Singapore	4:10.69	
16	1	9	Kim Ji-Hyun (1:04.16); Back Su-Yeon (1:09.19); Park Jin-Young (1:00.49); Hwang Seo-Jin (56.91)	South Korea	4:10.75	
17	2	8	Hoi Shun Stephanie Au (1:01.95); Man Yi Yvette Kong (1:10.68); Chan Kin Lok (1:03.31); Sze Hang Yu (55.82)	Hong Kong	4:11.76	
	1	6	Federica Pellegrini (1:01.31); Lisa Fissneider (1:07.97); Ilaria Bianchi (57.49); Erika Ferraioli	Italy		DSQ
	2	7	Cloé Credeville (1:00.86); Sophie de Ronchi (1:09.02); Mélanie Henique (1:00.79); Coralie Balmy	France		DSQ
	2	0		Czech Republic		DNS

=== Final ===
The final was held at 19:48.

Rank	Lane	Name	Nationality	Time	Notes
1st place, gold medalist(s)	4	Missy Franklin (58.39); Jessica Hardy (1:05.10); Dana Vollmer (56.31); Megan Romano (53.43)	United States	3:53.23	
2nd place, silver medalist(s)	5	Emily Seebohm (59.40); Sally Foster (1:06.84); Alicia Coutts (56.89); Cate Campbell (52.09)	Australia	3:55.22	
3rd place, bronze medalist(s)	1	Daria Ustinova (1:00.58); Yuliya Yefimova (1:04.82); Svetlana Chimrova (57.64); Veronika Popova (53.43)	Russia	3:56.47	
4	3	Fu Yuanhui (59.51); Sun Ye (1:07.71); Lu Ying (56.76); Tang Yi (53.32)	China	3:57.30	
5	2	Aya Terakawa (58.70) AS; Satomi Suzuki (1:06.73); Natsumi Hoshi (58.37); Haruka Ueda (54.26)	Japan	3:58.06	
6	6	Lauren Quigley (1:00.30); Sophie Allen (1:07.82); Jemma Lowe (57.34); Francesca Halsall (53.21)	Great Britain	3:58.67	
7	7	Hilary Caldwell (1:00.76); Martha McCabe (1:07.66); Katerine Savard (57.42); Chantal van Landeghem (54.35)	Canada	4:00.19	
8	8	Lisa Graf (1:01.22); Caroline Ruhnau (1:08.32); Alexandra Wenk (58.91); Britta Steffen (53.36)	Germany	4:01.81	
