= Swimming at the 2013 World Aquatics Championships – Women's 100 metre butterfly =

Women's 100 metre butterfly at the 2013 World Aquatics Championships
- Venue: Palau Sant Jordi
- Date: July 28, 2013 (heats & semifinals); July 29, 2013 (final)
- Competitors: 53 from 48 nations
- Winning time: 56.53

Medalists
gold medal	Sarah Sjöström	Sweden
silver medal	Alicia Coutts	Australia
bronze medal	Dana Vollmer	United States

Barcelona Palau San Jordi

This article is about the women's 100 metre butterfly event in swimming, at the 2013 World Aquatics Championships. The event took place on 28–29 July at the Palau Sant Jordi in Barcelona, Spain.

== Records ==
Prior to this competition, the existing world and championship records were:

World record	Dana Vollmer (USA)	55.98	London, Great Britain	29 July 2012
Competition record	Sarah Sjöström (SWE)	56.06	Rome, Italy	27 July 2009

== Results ==
=== Heats ===
The heats were held at 10:00.

Rank	Heat	Lane	Name	Nationality	Time	Notes
1	6	4	Dana Vollmer	United States	57.22	Q
2	6	5	Sarah Sjöström	Sweden	57.28	Q
3	6	3	Katerine Savard	Canada	57.31	Q, NR
4	5	4	Alicia Coutts	Australia	57.56	Q
5	5	5	Jeanette Ottesen Gray	Denmark	57.79	Q
6	6	6	Noemie Thomas	Canada	58.11	Q
7	4	5	Ilaria Bianchi	Italy	58.22	Q
8	5	6	Brittany Elmslie	Australia	58.27	Q
9	4	6	Jemma Lowe	Great Britain	58.38	Q
10	5	3	Claire Donahue	United States	58.58	Q
11	4	8	Ingvild Snildal	Norway	58.83	Q
12	4	4	Lu Ying	China	58.93	Q
13	6	2	Tao Li	Singapore	58.94	Q
14	5	8	Evelyn Verrasztó	Hungary	58.95	Q
15	5	0	Daynara de Paula	Brazil	59.16	Q
16	6	0	Judit Ignacio Sorribes	Spain	59.18	QSO
16	6	7	Natsumi Hoshi	Japan	59.18	QSO
18	4	3	Jiao Liuyang	China	59.21	
19	5	1	Kimberly Buys	Belgium	59.28	
19	5	2	Svetlana Chimrova	Russia	59.28	
21	6	8	Katarína Listopadová	Slovakia	59.34	
22	6	1	Amit Ivry	Israel	59.45	
23	4	1	Sophia Batchelor	New Zealand	59.46	
24	3	4	Farida Osman	Egypt	59.85	
25	4	0	Elmira Aigaliyeva	Kazakhstan	1:00.00	
26	5	7	Louise Hansson	Sweden	1:00.11	
27	4	2	Kristel Vourna	Greece	1:00.33	
28	4	7	Emilia Pikkarainen	Finland	1:00.47	
29	3	5	Jessica Maria Camposano Rios	Colombia	1:00.65	
30	4	9	Marne Erasmus	South Africa	1:00.73	
31	6	9	Park Jin-Young	South Korea	1:00.78	
32	5	9	Sze Hang Yu	Hong Kong	1:01.01	
33	3	6	İris Rosenberger	Turkey	1:01.35	
34	3	3	Cheng Wan-jung	Chinese Taipei	1:01.61	
35	3	2	Jasmine Alkhaldi	Philippines	1:01.71	
36	3	1	Loreen Whitfield	American Samoa	1:02.50	
37	2	7	Dorian McMenemy	Dominican Republic	1:03.53	
38	2	4	Marie Laura Meza	Costa Rica	1:03.63	
39	3	8	Monalisa Arieswati	Indonesia	1:03.93	
40	2	6	Dalia Tórrez Zamora	Nicaragua	1:04.43	
41	2	2	Poula Øssursdóttir Mohr	Faroe Islands	1:04.58	
42	3	7	Barbara Caraballo	Puerto Rico	1:04.65	
43	3	0	Caroline Puamau	Fiji	1:04.72	
44	1	3	Pooja Alva	India	1:05.70	
45	2	1	Ana Nobrega	Angola	1:06.55	
46	2	3	Noel Borshi	Albania	1:06.77	
47	2	8	María José Ribera Pinto	Bolivia	1:07.02	
48	2	0	Emily Mueti	Kenya	1:07.37	
49	2	5	Amboaratiana Domoinannava	Madagascar	1:09.30	
50	3	9	Johanna Umurungi	Rwanda	1:10.41	
51	2	9	Su Moe Theint San	Myanmar	1:10.62	
52	1	4	Afsana Ismayilova	Azerbaijan	1:16.58	
53	1	5	Charissa Panuve	Tonga	1:21.78	

==== Swim-off ====
The swim-off was held at 12:09.

Rank	Lane	Name	Nationality	Time	Notes
1	4	Natsumi Hoshi	Japan	58.83	Q
2	5	Judit Ignacio Sorribes	Spain	58.87	

=== Semifinals ===
The semifinals were held at 18:02.

==== Semifinal 1 ====
Rank	Lane	Name	Nationality	Time	Notes
1	4	Sarah Sjöström	Sweden	57.10	Q
2	5	Alicia Coutts	Australia	57.49	Q
3	3	Noemie Thomas	Canada	57.99	Q
4	2	Claire Donahue	United States	58.44	Q
5	6	Brittany Elmslie	Australia	58.56	
6	7	Lu Ying	China	58.67	
7	1	Evelyn Verrasztó	Hungary	58.74	
8	8	Natsumi Hoshi	Japan	59.42	

==== Semifinal 2 ====
Rank	Lane	Name	Nationality	Time	Notes
1	3	Jeanette Ottesen Gray	Denmark	57.19	Q
2	4	Dana Vollmer	United States	57.84	Q
3	5	Katerine Savard	Canada	58.00	Q
4	6	Ilaria Bianchi	Italy	58.29	Q
5	2	Jemma Lowe	Great Britain	58.46	
6	7	Ingvild Snildal	Norway	58.84	
7	1	Tao Li	Singapore	59.02	
8	8	Daynara de Paula	Brazil	59.04	

=== Final ===
The final was held at 18:10.

Rank	Lane	Name	Nationality	Time	Notes
1st place, gold medalist(s)	4	Sarah Sjöström	Sweden	56.53	
2nd place, silver medalist(s)	3	Alicia Coutts	Australia	56.97	
3rd place, bronze medalist(s)	6	Dana Vollmer	United States	57.24	
4	5	Jeanette Ottesen Gray	Denmark	57.27	
5	7	Katerine Savard	Canada	57.97	
6	1	Ilaria Bianchi	Italy	58.11	
7	2	Noemie Thomas	Canada	58.13	
8	8	Claire Donahue	United States	58.30	
