= Swimming at the 2013 World Aquatics Championships – Men's 50 metre breaststroke =

Men's 50 metre breaststroke at the 2013 World Aquatics Championships
- Venue: Palau Sant Jordi
- Dates: July 30, 2013 (heats & semifinals); July 31, 2013 (final)
- Competitors: 83 from 76 nations
- Winning time: 26.77

Medalists
gold medal	Cameron van der Burgh	South Africa
silver medal	Christian Sprenger	Australia
bronze medal	Giulio Zorzi	South Africa

Barcelona Palau San Jordi

The men's 50 metre breaststroke event in swimming at the 2013 World Aquatics Championships took place on 30–31 July at the Palau Sant Jordi in Barcelona, Spain.

== Records ==
Prior to this competition, the existing world and championship records were:

World record	Cameron van der Burgh (RSA)	26.67	Rome, Italy	29 July 2009
Competition record	Cameron van der Burgh (RSA)	26.67	Rome, Italy	29 July 2009

== Results ==
=== Heats ===
The heats were held at 10:00.

Rank	Heat	Lane	Name	Nationality	Time	Notes
1	8	6	Cameron van der Burgh	South Africa	26.78	Q
2	7	7	Felipe Lima	Brazil	27.11	Q
3	8	4	Glenn Snyders	New Zealand	27.27	Q
4	9	4	Christian Sprenger	Australia	27.30	Q
5	7	6	Kirill Strelnikov	Russia	27.36	Q
6	9	7	Giulio Zorzi	South Africa	27.37	Q
7	9	9	Gu Biaorong	China	27.38	Q
8	7	4	João Luiz Gomes Júnior	Brazil	27.39	Q
9	8	9	Kosuke Kitajima	Japan	27.43	Q
10	9	5	Kevin Steel	United States	27.45	Q
11	7	0	Dawid Szulich	Poland	27.48	Q, NR
11	9	3	Damir Dugonjič	Slovenia	27.48	Q
13	7	5	Mattia Pesce	Italy	27.52	Q
13	9	6	Barry Murphy	Ireland	27.52	Q
15	7	2	Johannes Skagius	Sweden	27.57	Q, NR
16	9	8	Eetu Karvonen	Finland	27.58	Q
17	7	3	Hendrik Feldwehr	Germany	27.59	
18	8	5	Fabio Scozzoli	Italy	27.60	
19	8	8	Yury Klemparski	Belarus	27.61	NR
20	7	1	Brenton Rickard	Australia	27.66	
21	8	3	Kevin Cordes	United States	27.69	
22	5	3	Miguel Ferreira	Venezuela	27.78	
22	7	9	Richard Funk	Canada	27.78	
22	9	1	Giacomo Perez d'Ortona	France	27.78	
25	8	1	Čaba Silađi	Serbia	27.80	
25	8	7	Ioannis Karpouzlis	Greece	27.80	
27	6	0	Petr Bartůněk	Czech Republic	27.84	
28	6	4	Édgar Crespo	Panama	27.89	
29	8	2	Giedrius Titenis	Lithuania	27.93	
30	9	2	Ross Murdoch	Great Britain	28.00	
31	6	2	Martin Schweizer	Switzerland	28.01	
32	6	5	Demir Atasoy	Turkey	28.04	NR
33	6	9	Ihor Borysyk	Ukraine	28.07	
33	8	0	Panteleimon Pantis	Greece	28.07	
35	5	8	Sandeep Sejwal	India	28.12	
36	5	7	Malick Fall	Senegal	28.15	
37	5	9	Carlos Almeida	Portugal	28.16	NR
37	6	6	Jorge Murillo	Colombia	28.16	=NR
39	6	7	Nikolajs Maskalenko	Latvia	28.20	
40	6	3	Martin Melconian	Uruguay	28.21	NR
41	6	8	Abraham McLeod	Trinidad and Tobago	28.26	
42	5	5	Shin Hyeong-Keun	South Korea	28.29	
43	5	0	David Oliver Mercado	Mexico	28.39	
43	6	1	Marek Botík	Slovakia	28.39	
45	4	7	Joshua Hall	Philippines	28.48	
45	5	1	Imri Ganiel	Israel	28.48	
47	5	6	Wong Chun Yan	Hong Kong	28.69	
48	5	4	Martin Liivamägi	Estonia	28.82	
49	4	4	Vladislav Mustafin	Uzbekistan	28.97	
50	4	5	Kirill Vais	Kyrgyzstan	29.15	
51	4	8	James Lawson	Zimbabwe	29.22	
52	4	3	Omiros Zagkas	Cyprus	29.29	
53	4	0	Radomyos Matjiur	Thailand	29.41	
54	4	1	Abdulrahman Al-Bader	Kuwait	29.47	
55	5	2	Shaun Yap	Malaysia	29.58	
56	3	5	Benjamin Schulte	Guam	29.61	
57	4	2	Rafael van Leeuwaarde	Suriname	29.66	
58	4	6	Mubarak Al-Besher	United Arab Emirates	29.74	
59	4	9	Jesús Flores	Honduras	29.76	
60	3	2	Andrew Rutherfurd	Bolivia	30.29	
61	3	7	Wael Koubrousli	Lebanon	30.44	
62	3	1	Serginni Marten	Netherlands Antilles	30.89	
63	3	8	Bradford Worrell	Saint Lucia	31.00	NR
64	2	5	Pierre-Andre Adam	Seychelles	31.31	
65	2	2	Troy Kojenlang	Marshall Islands	31.38	
66	3	0	Muhammad Isa Ahmad	Brunei	31.68	
67	3	9	Batsaikhan Dulguun	Mongolia	31.76	
68	2	3	Earlando McRae	Guyana	32.24	
69	2	7	Hemthon Ponloeu	Cambodia	32.41	
70	2	4	Joshua Tibatemwa	Uganda	33.85	
71	2	6	Lin Tin Kyaw	Myanmar	33.89	
72	1	5	Mohamed Cheic Camara	Guinea	34.24	
73	3	3	Ashraf Hassan	Maldives	34.58	
74	1	3	Thierry Sawadogo	Burkina Faso	34.60	
75	3	6	Abdourahman Osman	Djibouti	34.93	
76	2	1	Nikolas Sylvester	Saint Vincent and the Grenadines	35.68	
77	2	8	Yokubdzhon Umarov	Tajikistan	36.50	
78	1	4	Sahr James	Sierra Leone	37.26	
79	3	4	Kurt Oniangue	Congo	39.98	
80	2	0	Moctar Albachir	Niger	43.58	
	2	9	Boubou Togo	Mali		DSQ
	7	8	Li Xiayan	China		DSQ
	9	0	Tshisungu Kalala	DR Congo		DSQ

=== Semifinals ===
The semifinals were held at 18:18.

==== Semifinal 1 ====
Rank	Lane	Name	Nationality	Time	Notes
1	7	Damir Dugonjič	Slovenia	26.83	Q, =EU
2	6	João Luiz Gomes Júnior	Brazil	27.05	Q
3	5	Christian Sprenger	Australia	27.10	Q
4	3	Giulio Zorzi	South Africa	27.44	Q
5	4	Felipe Lima	Brazil	27.48	
6	2	Kevin Steel	United States	27.60	
7	1	Barry Murphy	Ireland	27.78	
	8	Eetu Karvonen	Finland		DSQ

==== Semifinal 2 ====
Rank	Lane	Name	Nationality	Time	Notes
1	4	Cameron van der Burgh	South Africa	26.81	Q
2	8	Johannes Skagius	Sweden	27.16	Q, NR
3	5	Glenn Snyders	New Zealand	27.22	Q
4	1	Mattia Pesce	Italy	27.42	Q
5	6	Gu Biaorong	China	27.53	
5	7	Dawid Szulich	Poland	27.53	
7	3	Kirill Strelnikov	Russia	27.75	
8	2	Kosuke Kitajima	Japan	27.82	

=== Final ===
The final was held at 18:41.

Rank	Lane	Name	Nationality	Time	Notes
1st place, gold medalist(s)	4	Cameron van der Burgh	South Africa	26.77	
2nd place, silver medalist(s)	6	Christian Sprenger	Australia	26.78	
3rd place, bronze medalist(s)	8	Giulio Zorzi	South Africa	27.04	
4	5	Damir Dugonjič	Slovenia	27.05	
5	3	João Luiz Gomes Júnior	Brazil	27.20	
6	7	Glenn Snyders	New Zealand	27.21	
7	2	Johannes Skagius	Sweden	27.48	
8	1	Mattia Pesce	Italy	27.53	
