= Swimming at the 2013 World Aquatics Championships – Women's 50 metre breaststroke =

Women's 50 metre breaststroke at the 2013 World Aquatics Championships
- Venue: Palau Sant Jordi
- Dates: August 3, 2013 (heats & semifinals); August 4, 2013 (final)
- Competitors: 74 from 66 nations
- Winning time: 29.52

Medalists
gold medal	Yuliya Yefimova	Russia
silver medal	Rūta Meilutytė	Lithuania
bronze medal	Jessica Hardy	United States

Barcelona Palau San Jordi

The women's 50 metre breaststroke event in swimming at the 2013 World Aquatics Championships took place on 3–4 August at the Palau Sant Jordi in Barcelona, Spain.

== Records ==
Prior to this competition, the existing world and championship records were:

World record	Jessica Hardy (USA)	29.80	Federal Way, United States	7 August 2009
Competition record	Yuliya Yefimova (RUS)	30.09	Rome, Italy	2 August 2009

The following new records were set during this competition.

Date	Event	Name	Nationality	Time	Record
29 July	Heats – Women's 100 metre breaststroke	Rūta Meilutytė	Lithuania	29.97†	CR
3 August	Heats	Yuliya Yefimova	Russia	29.78	WR
3 August	Semifinal 2	Rūta Meilutytė	Lithuania	29.48	WR

† – en route to final mark

== Results ==
=== Heats ===
The heats were held at 10:32.

Rank	Heat	Lane	Name	Nationality	Time	Notes
1	8	5	Yuliya Yefimova	Russia	29.78	Q, WR
2	8	4	Jessica Hardy	United States	29.99	Q
3	6	4	Rūta Meilutytė	Lithuania	30.07	Q
4	7	4	Breeja Larson	United States	30.46	Q
5	6	5	Jennie Johansson	Sweden	30.55	Q, NR
6	8	6	Mariya Liver	Ukraine	30.68	Q, NR
7	7	5	Petra Chocová	Czech Republic	30.77	Q, NR
8	8	3	Moniek Nijhuis	Netherlands	30.82	Q
9	7	6	Fiona Doyle	Ireland	30.93	Q, NR
10	7	3	Alia Atkinson	Jamaica	31.12	Q
11	7	8	Marina García	Spain	31.22	Q
12	6	3	Rikke Møller Pedersen	Denmark	31.23	Q
13	7	7	Rebecca Ejdervik	Sweden	31.39	Q
14	6	8	He Yuzhe	China	31.46	Q
15	8	8	Samantha Marshall	Australia	31.49	Q
16	5	8	Hrafnhildur Lúthersdóttir	Iceland	31.50	Q, NR
17	6	7	Michela Guzzetti	Italy	31.51	
18	7	9	Kim Janssens	Belgium	31.52	NR
19	6	2	Valentina Artemyeva	Russia	31.56	
20	6	6	Beatriz Travalon	Brazil	31.59	
21	8	1	Viktoriya Solnceva	Ukraine	31.63	
22	6	9	Veera Kivirinta	Finland	31.66	
23	5	5	Amit Ivry	Israel	31.67	NR
24	7	2	Suo Ran	China	31.70	
25	7	1	Caroline Ruhnau	Germany	31.73	
26	8	0	Jessica Vall	Spain	31.77	
27	8	2	Lisa Fissneider	Italy	31.94	
28	5	6	Kim Go-Eun	South Korea	31.95	
29	7	0	Anna Makinen	Finland	32.02	
30	8	7	Tera van Beilen	Canada	32.03	
31	6	0	Henriette Brekke	Norway	32.11	
32	5	7	Julia Sebastian	Argentina	32.28	
33	8	9	Ivana Ninković	Bosnia and Herzegovina	32.32	
34	5	4	Rie Kaneto	Japan	32.37	
35	4	7	Yvette Man Yi Kong	Hong Kong	32.56	
36	4	3	Mercedes Toledo	Venezuela	32.61	NR
37	3	4	Samantha Yeo	Singapore	32.69	
38	5	3	Caroline Reitshammer	Austria	32.72	
39	5	1	Erica Dittmer	Mexico	32.73	
40	5	2	Sarah Vaisse	France	32.74	
41	4	4	Zuzana Mimovičová	Slovakia	32.79	
42	1	2	Dariya Talanova	Kyrgyzstan	32.83	
43	3	6	Tatiana Chişca	Moldova	32.85	
44	5	0	Ioana Alexandra Popa	Romania	32.96	
45	4	2	Tara-Lynn Nicholas	South Africa	33.04	
46	4	9	Mai Atef	Egypt	33.08	
47	4	8	Vangelina Draganova	Bulgaria	33.10	
47	3	3	Christina Loh	Malaysia	33.10	
49	5	9	Lei On Kei	Macau	33.37	
50	4	6	Monica Álvarez	Colombia	33.39	
50	3	5	Chen I-chuan	Chinese Taipei	33.39	
52	4	5	Miriam Corsini	Mozambique	33.45	
53	4	0	Evita Leter	Suriname	33.55	
54	4	1	Maria Romanjuk	Estonia	33.56	
55	3	7	Pilar Shimizu	Guam	34.20	
56	3	8	Tilka Paljk	Zambia	34.28	
57	2	4	Vanessa Rivas	Dominican Republic	34.52	NR
58	3	9	Tegan McCarthy	Papua New Guinea	34.81	
59	3	1	Rachael Tonjor	Nigeria	35.41	
60	3	2	Natalia Gomez	Costa Rica	35.49	
61	2	7	Mahfuza Khatun	Bangladesh	35.63	
62	2	5	Shne Joachim	Saint Vincent and the Grenadines	35.76	
63	2	8	Bonita Imsirovic	Botswana	36.53	
64	2	0	Teona Bostashvili	Georgia	37.04	
65	3	0	Oreoluwa Cherebin	Grenada	37.11	
66	2	6	Chade Nersicio	Netherlands Antilles	37.43	
67	2	3	Altansukh Nomin	Mongolia	37.78	
68	2	9	Mariam Foum	Tanzania	38.21	
69	1	4	Anum Bandey	Pakistan	38.50	
70	2	2	Hemthon Vitiny	Cambodia	39.53	
71	1	3	Angelika Ouedraogo	Burkina Faso	39.58	
72	1	5	Ramatoulaye Camara	Guinea	48.31	
73	1	6	Haoua Sangare	Mali	49.68	
74	1	7	Lareiba Seibon	Niger	49.72	
	2	1	Vanessa Kokoe	Ivory Coast		DNS
	6	1	Satomi Suzuki	Japan		DNS

=== Semifinals ===
The semifinals were held at 18:26.

==== Semifinal 1 ====
Rank	Lane	Name	Nationality	Time	Notes
1	4	Jessica Hardy	United States	29.90	Q
2	5	Breeja Larson	United States	30.20	Q
3	7	Rikke Møller Pedersen	Denmark	30.57	Q
4	6	Moniek Nijhuis	Netherlands	30.61	Q
5	3	Mariya Liver	Ukraine	30.94	
6	2	Alia Atkinson	Jamaica	31.27	
7	8	Hrafnhildur Lúthersdóttir	Iceland	31.37	NR
8	1	He Yuzhe	China	31.67	

==== Semifinal 2 ====
Rank	Lane	Name	Nationality	Time	Notes
1	5	Rūta Meilutytė	Lithuania	29.48	Q, WR
2	4	Yuliya Yefimova	Russia	29.88	Q
3	6	Petra Chocová	Czech Republic	30.31	Q, NR
4	3	Jennie Johansson	Sweden	30.66	Q
5	7	Marina García	Spain	31.24	
6	8	Samantha Marshall	Australia	31.26	
7	2	Fiona Doyle	Ireland	31.52	
8	1	Rebecca Ejdervik	Sweden	31.73	

=== Final ===
The final was held at 18:08.

Rank	Lane	Name	Nationality	Time	Notes
1st place, gold medalist(s)	5	Yuliya Yefimova	Russia	29.52	NR
2nd place, silver medalist(s)	4	Rūta Meilutytė	Lithuania	29.59	
3rd place, bronze medalist(s)	3	Jessica Hardy	United States	29.80	=AM
4	6	Breeja Larson	United States	29.95	
5	8	Jennie Johansson	Sweden	30.23	
6	7	Rikke Møller Pedersen	Denmark	30.72	
7	1	Moniek Nijhuis	Netherlands	31.31	
	2	Petra Chocová	Czech Republic		DSQ
