= Russia at the 2013 World Aquatics Championships =

- Flag of Russia
- World Aquatics code: RUS
- National federation: All Russian Swimming Federation
- Website: www.russwimming.ru

in Barcelona, Spain
- Medals Ranked 3rd: Gold 9 Silver 6 Bronze 4 Total 19

World Aquatics Championships appearances
- 1994; 1998; 2001; 2003; 2005; 2007; 2009; 2011; 2013; 2015; 2017; 2019; 2022–2025

Other related appearances
- Soviet Union (1973–1991)

Russia competed at the 2013 World Aquatics Championships in Barcelona, Spain between 19 July and 4 August 2013.

== Medalists ==
Medal	Name	Sport	Event	Date
Gold	Svetlana Romashina	Synchronized swimming	Solo technical routine	20 July
Gold	Svetlana Romashina; Svetlana Kolesnichenko	Synchronized swimming	Duet technical routine	21 July
Gold	Vlada Chigireva; Mikhaela Kalancha; Daria Korobova; Anisya Olkhova; Aleksandra Patskevich; Elena Prokofyeva; Alla Shishkina; Maria Shurochkina; Angelika Timanina; Aleksandra Zueva	Synchronized swimming	Team technical routine	22 July
Gold	Svetlana Romashina	Synchronized swimming	Solo free routine	24 July
Gold	Svetlana Romashina; Svetlana Kolesnichenko	Synchronized swimming	Duet free routine	25 July
Gold	Vlada Chigireva; Svetlana Kolesnichenko; Daria Korobova; Anisya Olkhova; Aleksandra Patskevich; Elena Prokofyeva; Alla Shishkina; Maria Shurochkina; Angelika Timanina; Aleksandra Zueva	Synchronized swimming	Team free routine	26 July
Gold	Vlada Chigireva; Mikhaela Kalancha; Daria Korobova; Anisya Olkhova; Alexandra Patskevich; Elena Prokofyeva; Alla Shishkina; Maria Shurochkina; Angelika Timanina; Alexandra Zueva	Synchronized swimming	Free routine combination	27 July
Gold	Yuliya Yefimova	Swimming	Women's 200 m breaststroke	2 August
Gold	Yuliya Yefimova	Swimming	Women's 50 m breaststroke	4 August
Silver	Artem Chesakov; Victor Minibaev	Diving	Men's 10 m synchronized platform	21 July
Silver	Evgeny Kuznetsov; Ilya Zakharov	Diving	Men's 3 m synchronized springboard	23 July
Silver	Evgeny Kuznetsov	Diving	Men's 3 m springboard	26 July
Silver	Yuliya Yefimova	Swimming	Women's 100 m breaststroke	30 July
Silver	Danila Izotov; Nikita Lobintsev; Artem Lobuzov; Alexander Sukhorukov	Swimming	Men's 4 × 200 m freestyle relay	2 August
Silver	Vladimir Morozov	Swimming	Men's 50 m freestyle	3 August
Bronze	Evgeny Drattsev	Open water swimming	Men's 25 km	27 July
Bronze	Sergey Fesikov; Andrey Grechin; Danila Izotov; Yevgeny Lagunov*; Nikita Lobintsev; Vladimir Morozov; Alexander Sukhorukov*	Swimming	Men's 4 × 100 m freestyle relay	28 July
Bronze	Danila Izotov	Swimming	Men's 200 m freestyle	30 July
Bronze	Anna Belousova*; Svetlana Chimrova; Veronika Popova; Dariya Ustinova; Yuliya Yefimova	Swimming	Women's 4 × 100 m medley relay	4 August

== Diving ==
Russia has qualified the following divers:

Men

Athlete	Event	Preliminaries		Semifinals		Final	
Athlete	Event	Points	Rank	Points	Rank	Points	Rank
Sergey Nazin	1 m springboard	352.65	11 Q	—		380.00	11
Evgeny Novoselov	1 m springboard	344.10	13	—		did not advance	
Evgeny Kuznetsov	3 m springboard	419.40	8 Q	476.00	3 Q	508.00	2nd place, silver medalist(s)
Ilya Zakharov	3 m springboard	396.15	16 Q	414.20	14	did not advance	
Victor Minibaev	10 m platform	486.55	3 Q	480.30	4 Q	449.75	8
Sergey Nazin	10 m platform	382.90	17 Q	447.20	10 Q	410.10	11
Evgeny Kuznetsov; Ilya Zakharov	3 m synchronized springboard	445.32	2 Q	—		428.01	2nd place, silver medalist(s)
Artem Chesakov; Victor Minibaev	10 m synchronized platform	409.86	4 Q	—		445.95	2nd place, silver medalist(s)

Women

Athlete	Event	Preliminaries		Semifinals		Final	
Athlete	Event	Points	Rank	Points	Rank	Points	Rank
Daria Govor	1 m springboard	250.80	9 Q	—		256.45	7
Maria Polyakova	1 m springboard	215.45	28	—		did not advance	
Diana Chaplieva	3 m springboard	208.50	34	did not advance			
Maria Polyakova	3 m springboard	229.05	27	did not advance			
Yekaterina Petukhova	10 m platform	278.75	19	did not advance			
Yulia Timoshinina	10 m platform	271.20	21	did not advance			
Diana Chaplieva; Daria Govor	3 m synchronized springboard	263.10	10 Q	—		278.40	9
Yekaterina Petukshova; Yulia Timoshinina	10 m synchronized platform	308.04	5 Q	—		298.32	8

== High diving ==
Russia has qualified a single athlete in high diving.

Athlete	Event	Points	Rank
Artem Silchenko	Men's high diving	520.55	6

== Open water swimming ==
Russia has qualified the following swimmers in open water marathon.

Men

Athlete	Event	Time	Rank
Kirill Abrosimov	10 km	1:50:22.5	34
Sergey Bolshakov	5 km	53:36.8	8
Sergey Bolshakov	10 km	1:49:34.5	17
Evgeny Drattsev	5 km	53:38.6	12
Evgeny Drattsev	25 km	4:47:28.1	3rd place, bronze medalist(s)
Vladimir Dyatchin	25 km	4:58:18.0	23

Women

Athlete	Event	Time	Rank
Anastasiya Azarova	5 km	57:04.3	15
Elizaveta Gorshkova	5 km	57:06.2	17
Elizaveta Gorshkova	10 km	1:58:24.3	11
Alexandra Sokolova	10 km	2:04:45.3	39
Alexandra Sokolova	25 km	5:18:14.3	10

Mixed

Athlete	Event	Time	Rank
Sergey Bolshakov; Evgeny Drattsev; Elizaveta Gorshkova	Team	56:08.7	8

== Swimming ==
Russian swimmers earned qualifying standards in the following events (up to a maximum of 2 swimmers in each event at the A-standard entry time, and 1 at the B-standard):

Men

Athlete	Event	Heat		Semifinal		Final	
Athlete	Event	Time	Rank	Time	Rank	Time	Rank
Marat Amaltdinov	200 m breaststroke	2:11.41	12 Q	2:13.06	16	did not advance	
Andrey Grechin	50 m freestyle	22.08	13 Q	22.00	11	did not advance	
Danila Izotov	200 m freestyle	1:47.76	7 Q	1:45.84	1 Q	1:45.59	3rd place, bronze medalist(s)
Yevgeny Korotyshkin	50 m butterfly	23.98	27	did not advance			
Yevgeny Korotyshkin	100 m butterfly	51.55	1 Q	51.60	4 Q	51.57	5
Nikita Lobintsev	100 m freestyle	48.51	3 Q	48.73	=13	did not advance	
Nikita Lobintsev	200 m freestyle	1:48.41	17	did not advance			
Vladimir Morozov	50 m freestyle	21.95	7 Q	21.63 NR	5 Q	21.47 NR	2nd place, silver medalist(s)
Vladimir Morozov	100 m freestyle	48.67	7 Q	48.20	=4 Q	48.01	5
Vyacheslav Sinkevich	100 m breaststroke	1:01.38	=28	did not advance			
Vyacheslav Sinkevich	200 m breaststroke	2:10.82	8 Q	2:09.47	4 Q	2:09.34	6
Nikolay Skvortsov	100 m butterfly	52.09	8 Q	51.86	10	did not advance	
Nikolay Skvortsov	200 m butterfly	1:56.47	4 Q	1:56.02	6 Q	1:56.02	6
Kirill Strelnikov	50 m breaststroke	27.36	5 Q	27.75	13	did not advance	
Kirill Strelnikov	100 m breaststroke	59.80	2 Q	59.94	9	did not advance	
Sergey Fesikov*; Andrey Grechin; Danila Izotov; Yevgeny Lagunov*; Nikita Lobintsev; Vladimir Morozov; Alexander Sukhorukov*	4 × 100 m freestyle relay	3:12.43	2 Q	—		3.11.44	3rd place, bronze medalist(s)
Danila Izotov; Nikita Lobintsev; Artem Lobuzov; Alexander Sukhorukov	4 × 200 m freestyle relay	7:09.87	2 Q	—		7:03.92	2nd place, silver medalist(s)
Andrey Grechin; Yevgeny Korotyshkin; Nikita Lobintsev*; Vladimir Morozov; Nikolay Skvortsov*; Kirill Strelnikov	4 × 100 m medley relay	3:33.64	=2 Q	—		3:32.74	4

Women

Athlete	Event	Heat		Semifinal		Final	
Athlete	Event	Time	Rank	Time	Rank	Time	Rank
Viktoriya Andreyeva	200 m freestyle	1:59.02	18	did not advance			
Viktoriya Andreyeva	200 m individual medley	2.13.61	14 Q	2:12.67	13	did not advance	
Valentina Artemyeva	50 m breaststroke	31.56	19	did not advance			
Anna Belousova	100 m breaststroke	1:08.69	24	did not advance			
Svetlana Chimrova	50 m butterfly	26.51	14 Q	26.47	=13	did not advance	
Svetlana Chimrova	100 m butterfly	59.28	=19	did not advance			
Svetlana Kniaginina	50 m freestyle	25.59	22	did not advance			
Yana Martynova	200 m butterfly	2:13.99	20	did not advance			
Yana Martynova	400 m individual medley	4:44.03	15	—		did not advance	
Veronika Popova	100 m freestyle	54.53	=10 Q	54.15	9	did not advance	
Veronika Popova	200 m freestyle	1:59.31	20	did not advance			
Dariya Ustinova	50 m backstroke	28.81	=22	did not advance			
Dariya Ustinova	100 m backstroke	1:02.04	24	did not advance			
Dariya Ustinova	200 m backstroke	2:08.69	4 Q	2:09.08	7 Q	2:11.30	8
Yuliya Yefimova	50 m breaststroke	29.78 WR	1 Q	29.88	2 Q	29.52 NR	1st place, gold medalist(s)
Yuliya Yefimova	100 m breaststroke	1:05.24 NR	3 Q	1:05.29	2 Q	1:05.02 NR	2nd place, silver medalist(s)
Yuliya Yefimova	200 m breaststroke	2:23.13	3 Q	2:19.85 NR	2 Q	2:19.41 NR	1st place, gold medalist(s)
Viktoriya Andreyeva; Mariya Baklakova; Margarita Nesterova; Veronika Popova	4 × 100 m freestyle relay	3:38.32	5 Q	—		3:38.45	6
Mariya Baklakova; Daria Belyakina; Yelena Sokolova; Kseniya Yuskova	4 × 200 m freestyle relay	7:59.12	9	—		did not advance	
Anna Belousova*; Svetlana Chimrova; Veronika Popova; Dariya Ustinova; Yuliya Yefimova	4 × 100 m medley relay	4:00.69	7 Q	—		3:56.47	3rd place, bronze medalist(s)

== Synchronized swimming ==
Russia has qualified twelve synchronized swimmers.

Athlete	Event	Preliminaries		Final	
Athlete	Event	Points	Rank	Points	Rank
Svetlana Romashina	Solo free routine	96.930	1 Q	97.430	1st place, gold medalist(s)
Svetlana Romashina	Solo technical routine	96.200	1 Q	96.800	1st place, gold medalist(s)
Svetlana Kolesnichenko; Svetlana Romashina	Duet free routine	97.230	1 Q	97.680	1st place, gold medalist(s)
Svetlana Kolesnichenko; Svetlana Romashina	Duet technical routine	97.000	1 Q	97.300	1st place, gold medalist(s)
Vlada Chigireva; Svetlana Kolesnichenko; Daria Korobova; Anisya Olkhova; Aleksandra Patskevich; Elena Prokofyeva; Alla Shishkina; Maria Shurochkina; Angelika Timanina; Aleksandra Zueva	Team free routine	97.390	1 Q	97.400	1st place, gold medalist(s)
Vlada Chigireva; Mikhaela Kalancha; Daria Korobova; Anisya Olkhova; Aleksandra Patskevich; Elena Prokofyeva; Alla Shishkina; Maria Shurochkina; Angelika Timanina; Aleksandra Zueva	Team technical routine	96.500	1 Q	96.600	1st place, gold medalist(s)
Vlada Chigireva; Mikhaela Kalancha; Daria Korobova; Anisya Olkhova; Aleksandra Patskevich; Elena Prokofyeva; Alla Shishkina; Maria Shurochkina; Angelika Timanina; Aleksandra Zueva	Free routine combination	96.740	1 Q	97.060	1st place, gold medalist(s)

== Water polo ==
=== Women's tournament ===
Team roster

- Anna Ustyukhina
- Diana Antonova
- Ekaterina Prokofyeva
- Elvina Karimova
- Alexandra Antonova
- Olga Belova
- Ekaterina Tankeeva
- Anna Grineva
- Anna Timofeeva
- Olga Beliaeva
- Evgeniya Ivanova
- Ekaterina Zelentsova
- Anna Karnaukh

Group play

	Pld	W	D	L	GF	GA	GD	Pts
Russia	3	2	1	0	41	24	+17	5
Spain	3	2	0	1	40	23	+17	4
Netherlands	3	1	1	1	54	29	+25	3
Uzbekistan	3	0	0	3	13	72	−59	0

21 July 2013; 09:30	Report	Russia	22–6	Uzbekistan	Piscines Bernat Picornell, Barcelona; Attendance: 225; Referees: Terepenka (CAN), Makita (JPN)
21 July 2013; 09:30	Report	Score by quarters: 5–1, 6–1, 5–2, 6–2			Piscines Bernat Picornell, Barcelona; Attendance: 225; Referees: Terepenka (CAN), Makita (JPN)
21 July 2013; 09:30	Report	Prokofyeva 6	Goals	three players 2	Piscines Bernat Picornell, Barcelona; Attendance: 225; Referees: Terepenka (CAN), Makita (JPN)

23 July 2013; 21:30	Report	Spain	6–7	Russia	Piscines Bernat Picornell, Barcelona; Attendance: 1,500; Referees: Drury (USA), Flahive (AUS)
23 July 2013; 21:30	Report	Score by quarters: 0–1, 2–1, 1–3, 3–2			Piscines Bernat Picornell, Barcelona; Attendance: 1,500; Referees: Drury (USA), Flahive (AUS)
23 July 2013; 21:30	Report	López 3	Goals	Prokofyeva 4	Piscines Bernat Picornell, Barcelona; Attendance: 1,500; Referees: Drury (USA), Flahive (AUS)

25 July 2013; 17:30	Report	Russia	12–12	Netherlands	Piscines Bernat Picornell, Barcelona; Attendance: 300; Referees: Bianchi (ITA), Stavridis (GRE)
25 July 2013; 17:30	Report	Score by quarters: 3–3, 4–2, 1–2, 4–5			Piscines Bernat Picornell, Barcelona; Attendance: 300; Referees: Bianchi (ITA), Stavridis (GRE)
25 July 2013; 17:30	Report	Beliaeva, Ivanova 3	Goals	Klaassen 4	Piscines Bernat Picornell, Barcelona; Attendance: 300; Referees: Bianchi (ITA), Stavridis (GRE)

Round of 16

27 July 2013; 09:30	Report	Russia	22–3	South Africa	Piscines Bernat Picornell, Barcelona; Attendance: 100; Referees: Ni (CHN), Vogel (HUN)
27 July 2013; 09:30	Report	Score by quarters: 5–0, 7–2, 6–1, 4–0			Piscines Bernat Picornell, Barcelona; Attendance: 100; Referees: Ni (CHN), Vogel (HUN)
27 July 2013; 09:30	Report	Beliaeva 5	Goals	three players 1	Piscines Bernat Picornell, Barcelona; Attendance: 100; Referees: Ni (CHN), Vogel (HUN)

Quarterfinal

29 July 2013; 15:30	Report	Russia	17–9	Canada	Piscines Bernat Picornell, Barcelona; Attendance: 560; Referees: Bender (GER), Peris (CRO)
29 July 2013; 15:30	Report	Score by quarters: 5–2, 3–1, 4–4, 5–2			Piscines Bernat Picornell, Barcelona; Attendance: 560; Referees: Bender (GER), Peris (CRO)
29 July 2013; 15:30	Report	Prokofyeva, Ivanova 4	Goals	Békhazi 4	Piscines Bernat Picornell, Barcelona; Attendance: 560; Referees: Bender (GER), Peris (CRO)

Semifinal

31 July 2013; 20:15	Report	Russia	6–9	Australia	Piscines Bernat Picornell, Barcelona; Attendance: 2,200; Referees: Margeta (SLO), Bianchi (ITA)
31 July 2013; 20:15	Report	Score by quarters: 2–1, 1–3, 1–2, 2–3			Piscines Bernat Picornell, Barcelona; Attendance: 2,200; Referees: Margeta (SLO), Bianchi (ITA)
31 July 2013; 20:15	Report	Ivanova 2	Goals	Zagame 3	Piscines Bernat Picornell, Barcelona; Attendance: 2,200; Referees: Margeta (SLO), Bianchi (ITA)

Third place game

2 August 2013; 16:30	Report	Russia	8–10	Hungary	Piscines Bernat Picornell, Barcelona; Attendance: 1,250; Referees: Drury (USA), Bianchi (ITA)
2 August 2013; 16:30	Report	Score by quarters: 3–3, 2–2, 2–3, 1–2			Piscines Bernat Picornell, Barcelona; Attendance: 1,250; Referees: Drury (USA), Bianchi (ITA)
2 August 2013; 16:30	Report	A. Antonova 3	Goals	Keszthelyi, Tóth 3	Piscines Bernat Picornell, Barcelona; Attendance: 1,250; Referees: Drury (USA), Bianchi (ITA)
