= South Africa at the 2013 World Aquatics Championships =

- Flag of South Africa
- World Aquatics code: RSA
- National federation: Swimming South Africa
- Website: www.swimsa.co.za

in Barcelona, Spain
- Medals Ranked 9th: Gold 3 Silver 1 Bronze 1 Total 5

World Aquatics Championships appearances
- 1973; 1975; 1978; 1982; 1986; 1991; 1994; 1998; 2001; 2003; 2005; 2007; 2009; 2011; 2013; 2015; 2017; 2019; 2022; 2023; 2024; 2025

South Africa competed at the 2013 World Aquatics Championships in Barcelona, Spain between 19 July and 4 August 2013.

== Medalists ==
Medal	Name	Sport	Event	Date
Gold	Chad le Clos	Swimming	Men's 200 m butterfly	31 July
Gold	Cameron van der Burgh	Swimming	Men's 50 m breaststroke	31 July
Gold	Chad le Clos	Swimming	Men's 100 m butterfly	3 August
Silver	Cameron van der Burgh	Swimming	Men's 100 m breaststroke	29 July
Bronze	Giulio Zorzi	Swimming	Men's 50 m breaststroke	31 July

== Diving ==
South Africa qualified four quota places for the following diving events.

Men

Athlete	Event	Preliminaries		Semifinals		Final	
Athlete	Event	Points	Rank	Points	Rank	Points	Rank
Addy van der Sluys	1 m springboard	239.15	41	—		Did not advance	

Women

Athlete	Event	Preliminaries		Semifinals		Final	
Athlete	Event	Points	Rank	Points	Rank	Points	Rank
Nicole Gillis	1 m springboard	198.70	35	—		Did not advance	
Julia Vincent	1 m springboard	222.40	20	—		Did not advance	
Nicole Gillis	3 m springboard	235.80	25	Did not advance			
Julia Vincent	3 m springboard	215.75	32	Did not advance			
Jaimee Gundry	10 m platform	248.95	27	Did not advance			
Nicole Gillis; Julia Vincent	3 m synchronized springboard	241.38	16	—		Did not advance	

== Open water swimming ==
South Africa qualified six quotas for the following events in open water swimming.

Men

Athlete	Event	Time	Rank
Chad Ho	5 km	53:33.7	4
Chad Ho	10 km	1:49:26.3	8
Daniel Marais	5 km	53:51.0	27
Troyden Prinsloo	10 km	1:51:48.0	51
Troyden Prinsloo	25 km	5:03:19.8	28

Women

Athlete	Event	Time	Rank
Clarice Le Roux	10 km	2:15:35.7	46
Kyna Pereira	5 km	57:30.8	25
Michelle Weber	5 km	DNF	
Michelle Weber	10 km	DNS	

Mixed

Athlete	Event	Time	Rank
Chad Ho; Daniel Marais; Clarice Le Roux	Team	56:34.7	11

== Swimming ==
South African swimmers achieved qualifying standards in the following events (up to a maximum of 2 swimmers in each event at the A-standard entry time, and 1 at the B-standard):

Men

Athlete	Event	Heat		Semifinal		Final	
Athlete	Event	Time	Rank	Time	Rank	Time	Rank
Devon Myles Brown	400 m freestyle	3:47.17	5 Q	—		3:48.40	=6
Devon Myles Brown	800 m freestyle	7:57.69	16	—		Did not advance	
Devon Myles Brown	1500 m freestyle	15:14.51	17	—		Did not advance	
Chad le Clos	50 m butterfly	23.76	23	Did not advance			
Chad le Clos	100 m butterfly	51.88	2 Q	51.52	2 Q	51.06 NR	1st place, gold medalist(s)
Chad le Clos	200 m butterfly	1:56.21	2 Q	1:55.33	1 Q	1:54.32	1st place, gold medalist(s)
Michael Meyer	200 m individual medley	2:01.96	26	Did not advance			
Michael Meyer	400 m individual medley	4:21.17	17	—		Did not advance	
Darren Murray	100 m backstroke	54.64	15 Q	55.02	16	Did not advance	
Darren Murray	200 m backstroke	1:59.19	16 Q	2:02.12	16	Did not advance	
Roland Mark Schoeman	50 m freestyle	22.04	11 Q	21.67 =AF	7 Q	21.85	7
Roland Mark Schoeman	50 m butterfly	23.02	1 Q	23.25	10	Did not advance	
Leith Shankland	100 m freestyle	50.21	34	Did not advance			
Leith Shankland	200 m freestyle	DNS		Did not advance			
Cameron van der Burgh	50 m breaststroke	26.78	1 Q	26.81	1 Q	26.77	1st place, gold medalist(s)
Cameron van der Burgh	100 m breaststroke	1:00.02	7 Q	59.78	=2 Q	58.97	2nd place, silver medalist(s)
Gerhard Zandberg	50 m backstroke	24.85	4 Q	25.24	13	Did not advance	
Giulio Zorzi	50 m breaststroke	27.37	6 Q	27.44	8 Q	27.04	3rd place, bronze medalist(s)
Devon Myles Brown; Chad le Clos; Leith Shankland; Roland Mark Schoeman	4 × 100 m freestyle relay	3:17.91	11	—		Did not advance	
Chad le Clos; Darren Murray; Leith Shankland; Cameron van der Burgh	4 × 100 m medley relay	3:36.22	11	—		Did not advance	

Women

Athlete	Event	Heat		Semifinal		Final	
Athlete	Event	Time	Rank	Time	Rank	Time	Rank
Jessica Ashley-Cooper	50 m backstroke	29.08	=25	Did not advance			
Marne Erasmus	100 m butterfly	1:00.73	30	Did not advance			
Trudi Maree	50 m freestyle	26.02	33	Did not advance			
Trudi Maree	50 m butterfly	27.40	32	Did not advance			
Tara-Lynn Nicholas	50 m breaststroke	33.04	45	Did not advance			
Tara-Lynn Nicholas	100 m breaststroke	1:10.22	31	Did not advance			
Tara-Lynn Nicholas	200 m breaststroke	2:34.41	31	Did not advance			
Kyna Pereira	400 m freestyle	4:19.66	25	—		Did not advance	
Kyna Pereira	800 m freestyle	8:54.10	28	—		Did not advance	
Karin Prinsloo	100 m freestyle	55.05	16 Q	55.00	14	Did not advance	
Karin Prinsloo	200 m freestyle	1:59.15	19	Did not advance			
Karin Prinsloo	100 m backstroke	1:01.25	16 Q	1:01.05	13	Did not advance	
Karin Prinsloo	200 m backstroke	2:10.71	11 Q	2:10.04	10	Did not advance	
Marlies Ross	200 m individual medley	2:16.94	28	Did not advance			
Rene Warnes	400 m individual medley	4:48.11	22	—		Did not advance	
Jessica Ashley-Cooper; Marne Erasmus; Tara-Lynn Nicholas; Karin Prinsloo	4 × 100 m medley relay	4:06.46	11	—		Did not advance	

== Synchronized swimming ==
South Africa has qualified the following synchronized swimmers.

Athlete	Event	Preliminaries		Final	
Athlete	Event	Points	Rank	Points	Rank
Emma Manners-Wood	Solo free routine	61.140	33	Did not advance	
Kerry Beth Norden	Solo technical routine	62.600	32	Did not advance	
Emma Manners-Wood; Laura Strugnell	Duet free routine	62.550	36	Did not advance	

== Water polo ==
=== Men's tournament ===
Team roster

- Dwayne Flatscher
- Etienne Le Roux
- Devon Card
- Ignardus Badenhorst
- Nicholas Rodda
- Jason Kyte
- Richard Downes
- Ryan Bell
- Dean Whyte
- Pierre Le Roux
- Nicholas Molyneux
- Adam Kajee
- Donn Stewart

Group play

	Pld	W	D	L	GF	GA	GD	Pts
Croatia	3	3	0	0	41	15	+26	6
United States	3	2	0	1	31	19	+12	4
Canada	3	1	0	2	32	32	0	2
South Africa	3	0	0	3	14	52	−38	0

22 July 2013; 12:10	Report	Canada	17–11	South Africa	Piscines Bernat Picornell, Barcelona; Attendance: 335; Referees: Golijanin (SRB), Rezvani (IRN)
22 July 2013; 12:10	Report	Score by quarters: 4–2, 2–3, 7–4, 4–2			Piscines Bernat Picornell, Barcelona; Attendance: 335; Referees: Golijanin (SRB), Rezvani (IRN)
22 July 2013; 12:10	Report	Constantin-Bicari 4	Goals	Card, Bell 3	Piscines Bernat Picornell, Barcelona; Attendance: 335; Referees: Golijanin (SRB), Rezvani (IRN)

24 July 2013; 09:30	Report	South Africa	3–16	United States	Piscines Bernat Picornell, Barcelona; Attendance: 600; Referees: Balfanbayev (KAZ), Ni (CHN)
24 July 2013; 09:30	Report	Score by quarters: 0–4, 1–5, 2–5, 0–2			Piscines Bernat Picornell, Barcelona; Attendance: 600; Referees: Balfanbayev (KAZ), Ni (CHN)
24 July 2013; 09:30	Report	Bell 2	Goals	Mann 5	Piscines Bernat Picornell, Barcelona; Attendance: 600; Referees: Balfanbayev (KAZ), Ni (CHN)

26 July 2013; 18:50	Report	Croatia	19–0	South Africa	Piscines Bernat Picornell, Barcelona; Attendance: 800; Referees: Ni (CHN), Rezvani (IRN)
26 July 2013; 18:50	Report	Score by quarters: 3–0, 4–0, 7–0, 5–0			Piscines Bernat Picornell, Barcelona; Attendance: 800; Referees: Ni (CHN), Rezvani (IRN)
26 July 2013; 18:50	Report	Sukno 5	Goals		Piscines Bernat Picornell, Barcelona; Attendance: 800; Referees: Ni (CHN), Rezvani (IRN)

Round of 16

28 July 2013; 09:30	Report	Greece	13–5	South Africa	Piscines Bernat Picornell, Barcelona; Attendance: 300; Referees: Abramović (MNE), Cardenuto (BRA)
28 July 2013; 09:30	Report	Score by quarters: 3–2, 3–2, 4–0, 3–1			Piscines Bernat Picornell, Barcelona; Attendance: 300; Referees: Abramović (MNE), Cardenuto (BRA)
28 July 2013; 09:30	Report	Gounas 3	Goals	five players 1	Piscines Bernat Picornell, Barcelona; Attendance: 300; Referees: Abramović (MNE), Cardenuto (BRA)

=== Women's tournament ===
Team roster

- Anke Jacobs
- Kimberly Schmidt
- Kieran Paley
- Christy Rawstron
- Megan Schooling
- Tarryn Schooling
- Kimberly Kay
- Lee-Anne Keet
- Delaine Christian
- Marcelle Keet
- Lindsay Killeen
- Kelsey White
- Thembelihle Mkize

Group play

	Pld	W	D	L	GF	GA	GD	Pts
Australia	3	3	0	0	45	10	+35	6
China	3	2	0	1	35	21	+14	4
New Zealand	3	1	0	2	22	35	−13	2
South Africa	3	0	0	3	10	46	−36	0

21 July 2013; 12:10	Report	China	17–2	South Africa	Piscines Bernat Picornell, Barcelona; Attendance: 150; Referees: Drury, Littlejohn (GBR)
21 July 2013; 12:10	Report	Score by quarters: 4–0, 4–0, 5–0, 4–2			Piscines Bernat Picornell, Barcelona; Attendance: 150; Referees: Drury, Littlejohn (GBR)
21 July 2013; 12:10	Report	Ma Huanhuan 5	Goals	L. Keet, M. Keet 1	Piscines Bernat Picornell, Barcelona; Attendance: 150; Referees: Drury, Littlejohn (GBR)

23 July 2013; 09:30	Report	South Africa	7–13	New Zealand	Piscines Bernat Picornell, Barcelona; Attendance: 200; Referees: Koryzna (POL), Abramović (MNE)
23 July 2013; 09:30	Report	Score by quarters: 2–3, 1–3, 1–3, 3–4			Piscines Bernat Picornell, Barcelona; Attendance: 200; Referees: Koryzna (POL), Abramović (MNE)
23 July 2013; 09:30	Report	White 3	Goals	Hudson, Myles 4	Piscines Bernat Picornell, Barcelona; Attendance: 200; Referees: Koryzna (POL), Abramović (MNE)

25 July 2013; 18:50	Report	Australia	16–1	South Africa	Piscines Bernat Picornell, Barcelona; Attendance: 200; Referees: Makita (JPN), Balfanbayev (KAZ)
25 July 2013; 18:50	Report	Score by quarters: 4–0, 5–1, 5–0, 2–0			Piscines Bernat Picornell, Barcelona; Attendance: 200; Referees: Makita (JPN), Balfanbayev (KAZ)
25 July 2013; 18:50	Report	Lincoln-Smith, Webster 3	Goals	White 1	Piscines Bernat Picornell, Barcelona; Attendance: 200; Referees: Makita (JPN), Balfanbayev (KAZ)

Round of 16

27 July 2013; 09:30	Report	Russia	22–3	South Africa	Piscines Bernat Picornell, Barcelona; Attendance: 100; Referees: Ni (CHN), Vogel (HUN)
27 July 2013; 09:30	Report	Score by quarters: 5–0, 7–2, 6–1, 4–0			Piscines Bernat Picornell, Barcelona; Attendance: 100; Referees: Ni (CHN), Vogel (HUN)
27 July 2013; 09:30	Report	Beliaeva 5	Goals	three players 1	Piscines Bernat Picornell, Barcelona; Attendance: 100; Referees: Ni (CHN), Vogel (HUN)
