= Swimming at the 2013 World Aquatics Championships – Women's 200 metre freestyle =

Women's 200 metre freestyle at the 2013 World Aquatics Championships
- Venue: Palau Sant Jordi
- Date: July 30, 2013 (heats & semifinals); July 31, 2013 (final)
- Competitors: 44 from 35 nations
- Winning time: 1:54.81

Medalists
gold medal	Missy Franklin	United States
silver medal	Federica Pellegrini	Italy
bronze medal	Camille Muffat	France

Barcelona Palau San Jordi

The women's 200 metre freestyle event in swimming at the 2013 World Aquatics Championships took place on 30–31 July at the Palau Sant Jordi in Barcelona, Spain.

== Records ==
Prior to this competition, the existing world and championship records were:

World record	Federica Pellegrini (ITA)	1:52.98	Rome, Italy	29 July 2009
Competition record	Federica Pellegrini (ITA)	1:52.98	Rome, Italy	29 July 2009

== Results ==
=== Heats ===
The heats were held at 10:19.

Rank	Heat	Lane	Name	Nationality	Time	Notes
1	5	4	Camille Muffat	France	1:56.53	Q
2	4	3	Katinka Hosszú	Hungary	1:56.73	Q
3	5	5	Federica Pellegrini	Italy	1:56.79	Q
4	5	6	Charlotte Bonnet	France	1:56.82	Q
5	4	4	Missy Franklin	United States	1:56.90	Q
6	3	6	Melanie Costa	Spain	1:57.01	Q
7	3	4	Bronte Barratt	Australia	1:57.14	Q
8	4	6	Femke Heemskerk	Netherlands	1:57.44	Q
9	4	5	Sarah Sjöström	Sweden	1:57.64	Q
10	3	5	Kylie Palmer	Australia	1:57.67	Q
11	4	7	Shannon Vreeland	United States	1:58.08	Q
12	4	2	Alice Mizzau	Italy	1:58.10	Q
13	3	3	Michelle Coleman	Sweden	1:58.17	Q
14	3	2	Qiu Yuhan	China	1:58.38	Q
15	5	8	Samantha Lucie-Smith	New Zealand	1:58.87	Q
16	5	2	Barbara Jardin	Canada	1:58.93	Q
17	5	0	Chihiro Igarashi	Japan	1:59.00	
18	3	1	Viktoriya Andreyeva	Russia	1:59.02	
19	3	8	Karin Prinsloo	South Africa	1:59.15	
20	5	3	Veronika Popova	Russia	1:59.31	
21	5	7	Samantha Cheverton	Canada	1:59.43	
22	3	0	Manuella Lyrio	Brazil	1:59.52	SA
23	4	1	Patricia Castro	Spain	2:00.36	
24	4	8	Nina Rangelova	Bulgaria	2:00.41	
25	5	1	Eleanor Faulkner	Great Britain	2:00.56	
26	3	7	Shen Duo	China	2:00.82	
27	2	4	Natthanan Junkrajang	Thailand	2:01.02	
28	4	9	Alexandra Wenk	Germany	2:01.60	
29	3	9	Quah Ting Wen	Singapore	2:02.57	
30	5	9	Liliana Ibáñez	Mexico	2:02.61	
31	2	6	Julia Hassler	Liechtenstein	2:02.76	
32	2	2	Jūratė Ščerbinskaitė	Lithuania	2:03.88	
33	4	0	Sze Hang Yu	Hong Kong	2:04.19	
34	2	3	Eygló Ósk Gústafsdóttir	Iceland	2:04.66	
35	2	7	Pamela Benitez	El Salvador	2:05.43	
36	2	8	Elisbet Gamez	Cuba	2:05.54	
37	2	1	Andrea Cedrón	Peru	2:08.14	
38	2	9	María López Nery	Paraguay	2:09.81	NR
39	1	5	Matelita Buadromo	Fiji	2:12.31	
40	2	0	Gabrielle Ponson	Aruba	2:13.01	
41	1	4	Alexis Clarke	Barbados	2:14.44	
42	1	3	Yara Lima	Angola	2:16.01	
43	1	6	Sofia Shah	Nepal	2:31.79	NR
44	1	2	Aminath Shajan	Maldives	2:32.05	
	2	5	Sycerika McMahon	Ireland		DNS

=== Semifinals ===
The semifinals were held at 19:14.

==== Semifinal 1 ====
Rank	Lane	Name	Nationality	Time	Notes
1	3	Melanie Costa	Spain	1:56.19	Q
2	2	Kylie Palmer	Australia	1:56.53	Q
3	5	Charlotte Bonnet	France	1:56.63	Q
4	4	Katinka Hosszú	Hungary	1:56.80	
5	6	Femke Heemskerk	Netherlands	1:56.98	
6	7	Alice Mizzau	Italy	1:58.05	
7	8	Barbara Jardin	Canada	1:58.66	
8	1	Qiu Yuhan	China	1:59.20	

==== Semifinal 2 ====
Rank	Lane	Name	Nationality	Time	Notes
1	5	Federica Pellegrini	Italy	1:55.78	Q
2	3	Missy Franklin	United States	1:56.05	Q
3	4	Camille Muffat	France	1:56.28	Q
4	2	Sarah Sjöström	Sweden	1:56.38	Q
5	7	Shannon Vreeland	United States	1:56.76	Q
6	1	Michelle Coleman	Sweden	1:56.90	
7	6	Bronte Barratt	Australia	1:57.18	
8	8	Samantha Lucie-Smith	New Zealand	1:59.26	

=== Final ===
The final was held at 18:32.

Rank	Lane	Name	Nationality	Time	Notes
1st place, gold medalist(s)	5	Missy Franklin	United States	1:54.81	
2nd place, silver medalist(s)	4	Federica Pellegrini	Italy	1:55.14	
3rd place, bronze medalist(s)	6	Camille Muffat	France	1:55.72	
4	2	Sarah Sjöström	Sweden	1:56.63	
5	3	Melanie Costa	Spain	1:57.04	
6	7	Kylie Palmer	Australia	1:57.14	
7	8	Shannon Vreeland	United States	1:57.41	
8	1	Charlotte Bonnet	France	1:57.56	
