= Synchronised swimming at the 2013 World Aquatics Championships – Solo free routine =

Solo free routine at the Synchronised swimming at the 2013 World Aquatics Championships
- Dates: 22 July (preliminaries); 24 July (final)
- Competitors: 34 from 34 nations
- Winning points: 97.430

Medalists
gold medal	Svetlana Romashina	Russia
silver medal	Huang Xuechen	China
bronze medal	Ona Carbonell	Spain

Barcelona Palau San Jordi

The solo free routine competition at 2013 World Aquatics Championships was held on July 22 with the preliminary round and the final on July 24.

== Results ==
The preliminary round was held on 22 July at 09:00 and the final on 24 July at 19:00.

Green denotes finalists

Rank	Diver	Nationality	Preliminary		Final	
Rank	Diver	Nationality	Points	Rank	Points	Rank
1st place, gold medalist(s)	Svetlana Romashina	Russia	96.930	1	97.340	1
2nd place, silver medalist(s)	Huang Xuechen	China	95.280	2	95.720	2
3rd place, bronze medalist(s)	Ona Carbonell	Spain	94.260	3	94.290	3
4	Lolita Ananasova	Ukraine	91.990	4	92.740	4
5	Yukiko Inui	Japan	91.570	5	91.600	5
6	Chloé Isaac	Canada	90.700	6	89.940	6
7	Despoina Solomou	Greece	89.680	7	88.800	7
8	Jenna Randall	Great Britain	87.970	9	87.590	8
8	Linda Cerruti	Italy	88.580	8	87.590	8
10	Ri Ju-Hyang	North Korea	84.600	11	84.910	10
11	Estel-Anaïs Hubaud	France	84.960	10	84.080	11
12	Soňa Bernardová	Czech Republic	84.410	12	83.690	12
13	Rebecca Kay Moody	United States	84.040	13		
14	Pamela Fischer	Switzerland	82.840	14		
15	Nuria Diosdado	Mexico	82.820	15		
16	Margot de Graaf	Netherlands	82.510	16		
17	Nadine Brandl	Austria	82.040	17		
18	Kyra Felßner	Germany	80.060	18		
19	Etel Sanchéz	Argentina	78.460	19		
20	Reem Abdalazem	Egypt	77.950	20		
21	Jana Labáthová	Slovakia	77.520	21		
22	Malin Gerdin	Sweden	76.790	22		
23	Kalina Yordanova	Bulgaria	76.490	23		
24	Jennifer Cerquera	Colombia	76.370	24		
25	Gu Se-Ul	South Korea	75.830	25		
26	Greisy Gomez	Venezuela	74.100	26		
27	Ana Cekić	Serbia	72.370	27		
28	Kirstin Anderson	New Zealand	71.650	28		
29	Violeta Mitinian	Costa Rica	70.160	29		
30	Au Ieong Sin Ieng	Macau	67.480	30		
31	Carmen Alfonso Rodriguez	Cuba	65.260	31		
32	Samara Pattiasina	Indonesia	65.010	32		
33	Emma Manners-Wood	South Africa	61.140	33		
34	Dhitaya Tanabunsombat	Thailand	54.960	34		
