= Canada at the 2013 World Aquatics Championships =

- Flag of Canada
- World Aquatics code: CAN
- National federation: Aquatic Federation of Canada
- Website: www.canadianaquatics.com

in Barcelona, Spain
- Medals Ranked 20th: Gold 0 Silver 3 Bronze 4 Total 7

World Aquatics Championships appearances
- 1973; 1975; 1978; 1982; 1986; 1991; 1994; 1998; 2001; 2003; 2005; 2007; 2009; 2011; 2013; 2015; 2017; 2019; 2022; 2023; 2024; 2025

Canada competed at the 2013 World Aquatics Championships in Barcelona, Spain between 19 July to 4 August 2013.

== Medallists ==
Medal	Name	Sport	Event	Date
Silver	Eric Hedlin	Open water swimming	Men's 5 km	20 July
Silver	Meaghan Benfeito; Roseline Filion	Diving	Women's 10 m synchronized platform	22 July
Silver	Ryan Cochrane	Swimming	Men's 1500 m freestyle	4 August
Bronze	Jennifer Abel; Pamela Ware	Diving	Women's 3 m synchronized springboard	20 July
Bronze	Pamela Ware	Diving	Women's 3 m springboard	27 July
Bronze	Ryan Cochrane	Swimming	Men's 800 m freestyle	31 July
Bronze	Hilary Caldwell	Swimming	Women's 200 m backstroke	3 August

== Diving ==
Canada qualified 7 divers.

Men

Athlete	Event	Preliminaries		Semifinals		Final	
Athlete	Event	Points	Rank	Points	Rank	Points	Rank
François Imbeau-Dulac	1 m springboard	299.00	27	—N/a		Did not advance	
François Imbeau-Dulac	3 m springboard	374.60	20	Did not advance			
Riley McCormick	3 m springboard	374.50	21	Did not advance			

Women

Athlete	Event	Preliminaries		Semifinals		Final	
Athlete	Event	Points	Rank	Points	Rank	Points	Rank
Pamela Ware	1 m springboard	261.45	6 Q	—N/a		265.10	5
Pamela Ware	3 m springboard	294.30	9 Q	311.45	6 Q	350.25	3rd place, bronze medalist(s)
Jennifer Abel	3 m springboard	286.60	11 Q	344.10	3 Q	339.75	5
Roseline Filion	10 m platform	301.85	13 Q	327.45	4 Q	316.70	8
Carol-Ann Ware	10 m platform	260.90	24	Did not advance			
Jennifer Abel; Pamela Ware	3 m synchronized springboard	300.78	3 Q	—N/a		292.08	3rd place, bronze medalist(s)
Meaghan Benfeito; Roseline Filion	10 m synchronized platform	308.40	4 Q	—N/a		331.41	2nd place, silver medalist(s)

== High diving ==
Canada qualified 1 high diver.

Athlete	Event	Points	Rank
Stephanie de Lima	Women's high diving	182.55	4

== Open water swimming ==
Canada qualified 5 open water swimmers.

Athlete	Event	Time	Rank
Philippe Guertin	Men's 5 km	53:46.4	23
Philippe Guertin	Men's 25 km	4:48:46.8	9
Eric Hedlin	Men's 5 km	53:31.6	2nd place, silver medalist(s)
Eric Hedlin	Men's 10 km	1:49:54.5	23
Richard Weinberger	Men's 10 km	1:49:19.9	5
Richard Weinberger	Men's 25 km	5:02:32.6	26
Zsofia Balazs	Women's 10 km	1:58:28.5	19
Nadine Williams	Women's 10 km	2:01:50.4	35
Nadine Williams	Women's 25 km	5:42:17.9	17
Philippe Guertin; Eric Hedlin; Zsofia Balazs	Mixed team	57:13.7	12

== Swimming ==
Canadian swimmers earned qualifying standards in the following events (up to a maximum of 2 swimmers in each event at the A-standard entry time, and 1 at the B-standard):

Men

Athlete	Event	Heat		Semifinal		Final	
Athlete	Event	Time	Rank	Time	Rank	Time	Rank
Christopher Manning	50 m freestyle	22.99	39	Did not advance			
Joel Greenshields	100 m freestyle	50.54	34	Did not advance			
Blake Worsley	200 m freestyle	1:49.30	28	Did not advance			
Ryan Cochrane	400 m freestyle	3:45.74	2 Q	—N/a		3:45.02	4
Ryan Cochrane	800 m freestyle	7:49.58	3 Q	—N/a		7:43.70	3rd place, bronze medalist(s)
Ryan Cochrane	1500 m freestyle	14:55.15	2 Q	—N/a		14:42.48	2nd place, silver medalist(s)
Will Brothers	1500 m freestyle	15:24.74	25	—N/a		Did not advance	
Charles Francis	50 m backstroke	26.10	24	Did not advance			
Charles Francis	100 m backstroke	54.72	16 Q	54.96	15	Did not advance	
Russell Wood	200 m backstroke	2:00.51	21	Did not advance			
Richard Funk	50 m breaststroke	27.78	=22	Did not advance			
Richard Funk	100 m breaststroke	1:00.89	22	Did not advance			
Ashton Baumann	200 m breaststroke	2:13.46	23	Did not advance			
Coleman Allen	50 m butterfly	24.25	32	Did not advance			
Coleman Allen	100 m butterfly	53.53	29	Did not advance			
Zack Chetrat	200 m butterfly	1:57.92	18	Did not advance			
Andrew Ford	200 m individual medley	2:01.69	23	Did not advance			
Alec Page	400 m individual medley	4:16.62	13	—N/a		Did not advance	
Hassan Abdel Khalik; Thomas Gossland; Joel Greenshields; Luke Peddie	4 × 100 m freestyle relay	3:20:24	14	—N/a		Did not advance	
Aly Abdel Khalik; Hassaan Abdel Khalik; Alec Page; Blake Worsley	4 × 200 m freestyle relay	7:17.17	12	—N/a		Did not advance	
Coleman Allen; Charles Francis; Richard Funk; Luke Peddie	4 × 100 m medley relay	3:38.76	15	—N/a		Did not advance	

Women

Athlete	Event	Heat		Semifinal		Final	
Athlete	Event	Time	Rank	Time	Rank	Time	Rank
Chantal van Landeghem	50 m freestyle	24.89	6 Q	24.96	9	Did not advance	
Victoria Poon	50 m freestyle	25.01	=10 Q	25.42	16	Did not advance	
Victoria Poon	100 m freestyle	55.30	19	Did not advance			
Samantha Cheverton	200 m freestyle	1:59.43	21	Did not advance			
Barbara Jardin	200 m freestyle	1:58.93	16 Q	1:58.66	14	Did not advance	
Savannah King	400 m freestyle	4:12.47	16	—N/a		Did not advance	
Savannah King	800 m freestyle	8:40.35	20	—N/a		Did not advance	
Alexa Komarnycky	800 m freestyle	8:29.87	13	—N/a		Did not advance	
Alexa Komarnycky	200 m individual medley	2:15.08	26	Did not advance			
Alexa Komarnycky	400 m individual medley	4:39.94	11	—N/a		Did not advance	
Sinead Russell	50 m backstroke	28.60	16 Q	28.35	14	Did not advance	
Sinead Russell	100 m backstroke	1:00.17	8 Q	1:00.37	9	Did not advance	
Sinead Russell	200 m backstroke	2:09.24	6 Q	2:09.84	8 Q	2:10.46	7
Kristina Steins	100 m backstroke	1:03.15	32	Did not advance			
Hilary Caldwell	200 m backstroke	2:07.81	3 Q	2:07.15	2 Q	2:06.80 NR	3rd place, bronze medalist(s)
Tera van Beilen	50 m breaststroke	32.03	30	Did not advance			
Tera van Beilen	100 m breaststroke	1:09.45	27	Did not advance			
Tera van Beilen	200 m breaststroke	2:31.34	21	Did not advance			
Martha McCabe	200 m breaststroke	2:25.91	8 Q	2:24.68	8 Q	2:25.21	8
Sandrine Mainville	50 m butterfly	26.52	15 Q	26.59	16	Did not advance	
Noemie Thomas	50 m butterfly	26.88	25	Did not advance			
Noemie Thomas	100 m butterfly	58.11	6 Q	57.99	5 Q	58.13	7
Katerine Savard	100 m butterfly	57.31 NR	3 Q	58.00	6 Q	57.97	5
Katerine Savard	200 m butterfly	2:10.72	14 Q	2:10.42	15	Did not advance	
Audrey Lacroix	200 m butterfly	2:09.13	10 Q	2:07.91	10	Did not advance	
Erika Seltenreich-Hodgson	200 m individual medley	2:13.84	14 Q	2:16.12	16	Did not advance	
Erika Seltenreich-Hodgson	400 m individual medley	4:46.11	19	—N/a		Did not advance	
Samantha Cheverton; Sandrine Mainville; Victoria Poon; Chantal van Landeghem	4 × 100 m freestyle relay	3:38.03	3 Q	—N/a		3:37.09	5
Samantha Cheverton; Barbara Jardin; Savannah King; Brittany MacLean	4 × 200 m freestyle relay	7:56.64	6 Q	—N/a		7:55.48	6
Hilary Caldwell; Martha McCabe; Katerine Savard; Chantal van Landeghem	4 × 100 m medley relay	4:00.34	6 Q	—N/a		4:00.19	7

== Synchronized swimming ==
Canada qualified 12 synchronized swimmers.

Athlete	Event	Preliminaries		Final	
Athlete	Event	Points	Rank	Points	Rank
Chloé Isaac	Solo free routine	90.700	6 Q	89.940	6
Chloé Isaac	Solo technical routine	91.000	6 Q	90.600	6
Emilia Kopcik; Stéphanie Leclair	Duet free routine	88.620	7 Q	87.370	8
Chloé Isaac; Karine Thomas	Duet technical routine	89.700	6 Q	90.000	6
Annabelle Frappier; Sandy Gill; Chloé Isaac; Emilia Kopcik; Stéphanie Leclair; Marie-Lou Morin; Jacqueline Simoneau; Karine Thomas; Camille Bowness * Lisa Mikelberg *	Team technical routine	90.100	5 Q	90.300	5
Sandy Gill; Chloé Isaac; Emilia Kopcik; Stéphanie Leclair; Lisa Mikelberg; Marie-Lou Morin; Jacqueline Simoneau; Karine Thomas; Camille Bowness * Annabelle Frappier *	Team free routine	88.180	6 Q	88.620	6
Camille Bowness; Annabelle Frappier; Sandy Gill; Claudia Holzner; Emilia Kopcik; Lisa Mikelberg; Marie-Lou Morin; Kaylene Scheil; Jacqueline Simoneau; Karine Thomas; Chloé Isaac * Stéphanie Leclair *	Free routine combination	91.280	5 Q	90.410	5

* Reserves

== Water polo ==
=== Men's tournament ===
Canada qualified a men's team.

Team roster

- Justin Boyd
- Nicolas Constantin-Bicari
- John Conway
- Devon Diggle
- Luka Gasic
- Kevin Graham
- Constantin Kudaba
- Ivan Marcisin
- Jared McElroy
- Alel Taschereau
- Robin Randall
- Scott Robinson
- Oliver Vikalo

Group play

	Pl	W	D	L	GF	GA	GD	Pts
Croatia	3	3	0	0	41	15	+26	6
United States	3	2	0	1	31	19	+12	4
Canada	3	1	0	2	32	32	0	2
South Africa	3	0	0	3	14	52	−38	0

22 July 2013; 12:10	Report	Canada	17–11	South Africa	Piscines Bernat Picornell, Barcelona; Attendance: 335; Referees: Golijanin (SRB), Rezvani (IRN)
22 July 2013; 12:10	Report	Score by quarters: 4–2, 2–3, 7–4, 4–2			Piscines Bernat Picornell, Barcelona; Attendance: 335; Referees: Golijanin (SRB), Rezvani (IRN)
22 July 2013; 12:10	Report	Constantin-Bicari 4	Goals	Card, Bell 3	Piscines Bernat Picornell, Barcelona; Attendance: 335; Referees: Golijanin (SRB), Rezvani (IRN)

24 July 2013; 10:50	Report	Croatia	13–8	Canada	Piscines Bernat Picornell, Barcelona; Attendance: 800; Referees: Koganov (AZE), Rezvani (IRN)
24 July 2013; 10:50	Report	Score by quarters: 3–0, 3–3, 4–3, 3–2			Piscines Bernat Picornell, Barcelona; Attendance: 800; Referees: Koganov (AZE), Rezvani (IRN)
24 July 2013; 10:50	Report	Muslim, Sukno 3	Goals	Constantin-Bicari 2	Piscines Bernat Picornell, Barcelona; Attendance: 800; Referees: Koganov (AZE), Rezvani (IRN)

26 July 2013; 20:10	Report	Canada	7–8	United States	Piscines Bernat Picornell, Barcelona; Attendance: 1,000; Referees: Golijanin (SRB), Flahive (AUS)
26 July 2013; 20:10	Report	Score by quarters: 2–2, 0–1, 1–2, 4–3			Piscines Bernat Picornell, Barcelona; Attendance: 1,000; Referees: Golijanin (SRB), Flahive (AUS)
26 July 2013; 20:10	Report	McElroy 3	Goals	Bowen 3	Piscines Bernat Picornell, Barcelona; Attendance: 1,000; Referees: Golijanin (SRB), Flahive (AUS)

Round of 16

28 July 2013; 10:50	Report	Montenegro	12–4	Canada	Piscines Bernat Picornell, Barcelona; Attendance: 800; Referees: Balfanbayev (KAZ), Vogel (HUN)
28 July 2013; 10:50	Report	Score by quarters: 2–1, 3–0, 3–3, 4–0			Piscines Bernat Picornell, Barcelona; Attendance: 800; Referees: Balfanbayev (KAZ), Vogel (HUN)
28 July 2013; 10:50	Report	Ivović 3	Goals	Kudaba 2	Piscines Bernat Picornell, Barcelona; Attendance: 800; Referees: Balfanbayev (KAZ), Vogel (HUN)

=== Women's tournament ===
Canada's qualified a women's team.

Team roster

- Krystina Alogbo
- Sophie Baron La Salle
- Joelle Bekhazi
- Nicola Colterjohn
- Carmen Eggens
- Monika Eggens
- Katrina Monton
- Dominique Perreault
- Marina Radu
- Michele Relton
- Christine Robinson
- Stephanie Valin
- Emma Wright

Group play

	Pld	W	D	L	GF	GA	GD	Pts
United States	3	3	0	0	38	20	+18	6
Canada	3	1	1	1	30	27	+3	3
Greece	3	1	1	1	29	27	+2	3
Great Britain	3	0	0	3	20	43	−23	0

21 July 2013; 17:30	Report	Canada	14–9	Great Britain	Piscines Bernat Picornell, Barcelona; Attendance: 300; Referees: Flahive (AUS), Moller (ARG)
21 July 2013; 17:30	Report	Score by quarters: 3–2, 4–3, 4–3, 3–1			Piscines Bernat Picornell, Barcelona; Attendance: 300; Referees: Flahive (AUS), Moller (ARG)
21 July 2013; 17:30	Report	Alogbo 4	Goals	Gibson-Byrne 4	Piscines Bernat Picornell, Barcelona; Attendance: 300; Referees: Flahive (AUS), Moller (ARG)

23 July 2013; 13:30	Report	United States	10–8	Canada	Piscines Bernat Picornell, Barcelona; Attendance: 200; Referees: Alexandrescu (ROU), Williams (NZL)
23 July 2013; 13:30	Report	Score by quarters: 4–1, 2–2, 3–2, 1–3			Piscines Bernat Picornell, Barcelona; Attendance: 200; Referees: Alexandrescu (ROU), Williams (NZL)
23 July 2013; 13:30	Report	Silver, Seidemann 2	Goals	Perreault 3	Piscines Bernat Picornell, Barcelona; Attendance: 200; Referees: Alexandrescu (ROU), Williams (NZL)

25 July 2013; 10:50	Report	Canada	8–8	Greece	Piscines Bernat Picornell, Barcelona; Attendance: 650; Referees: Taylan (TUR), Peris (CRO)
25 July 2013; 10:50	Report	Score by quarters: 2–3, 2–3, 3–0, 1–2			Piscines Bernat Picornell, Barcelona; Attendance: 650; Referees: Taylan (TUR), Peris (CRO)
25 July 2013; 10:50	Report	Eggens 4	Goals	Tsoukala, Asimaki 2	Piscines Bernat Picornell, Barcelona; Attendance: 650; Referees: Taylan (TUR), Peris (CRO)

Round of 16

27 July 2013; 18:50	Report	Canada	14–8	Kazakhstan	Piscines Bernat Picornell, Barcelona; Attendance: 300; Referees: Williams (NZL), Taylan (TUR)
27 July 2013; 18:50	Report	Score by quarters: 4–2, 5–1, 3–3, 2–2			Piscines Bernat Picornell, Barcelona; Attendance: 300; Referees: Williams (NZL), Taylan (TUR)
27 July 2013; 18:50	Report	Eggens 4	Goals	Shepelina, Gritsenko 2	Piscines Bernat Picornell, Barcelona; Attendance: 300; Referees: Williams (NZL), Taylan (TUR)

Quarterfinal

29 July 2013; 15:30	Report	Russia	17–9	Canada	Piscines Bernat Picornell, Barcelona; Attendance: 560; Referees: Bender (GER), Peris (CRO)
29 July 2013; 15:30	Report	Score by quarters: 5–2, 3–1, 4–4, 5–2			Piscines Bernat Picornell, Barcelona; Attendance: 560; Referees: Bender (GER), Peris (CRO)
29 July 2013; 15:30	Report	Prokofyeva, Ivanova 4	Goals	Békhazi 4	Piscines Bernat Picornell, Barcelona; Attendance: 560; Referees: Bender (GER), Peris (CRO)

5th–8th place semifinal

31 July 2013; 15:30	Report	Canada	8–12	Greece	Piscines Bernat Picornell, Barcelona; Attendance: 400; Referees: Moller (ARG), Taylan (TUR)
31 July 2013; 15:30	Report	Score by quarters: 1–5, 3–1, 1–5, 3–1			Piscines Bernat Picornell, Barcelona; Attendance: 400; Referees: Moller (ARG), Taylan (TUR)
31 July 2013; 15:30	Report	Wright, Eggens 2	Goals	Tsoukala 4	Piscines Bernat Picornell, Barcelona; Attendance: 400; Referees: Moller (ARG), Taylan (TUR)

Seventh place game

2 August 2013; 15:00	Report	Canada	9–12	Netherlands	Piscines Bernat Picornell, Barcelona; Attendance: 300; Referees: Vogel (HUN), Naumov (RUS)
2 August 2013; 15:00	Report	Score by quarters: 1–5, 2–3, 4–3, 2–1			Piscines Bernat Picornell, Barcelona; Attendance: 300; Referees: Vogel (HUN), Naumov (RUS)
2 August 2013; 15:00	Report	Valin 4	Goals	Smit, Klaassen 3	Piscines Bernat Picornell, Barcelona; Attendance: 300; Referees: Vogel (HUN), Naumov (RUS)
