= Sweden at the 2013 World Aquatics Championships =

- Flag of Sweden
- World Aquatics code: SWE
- National federation: Svenska Simidrott
- Website: www.svensksimidrott.se

in Barcelona, Spain
- Competitors: 16 in 3 sports
- Medals Ranked 14th: Gold 1 Silver 1 Bronze 0 Total 2

World Aquatics Championships appearances (overview)
- 1973; 1975; 1978; 1982; 1986; 1991; 1994; 1998; 2001; 2003; 2005; 2007; 2009; 2011; 2013; 2015; 2017; 2019; 2022; 2023; 2024; 2025

Sweden competed at the 2013 World Aquatics Championships in Barcelona, Spain from 19 July to 4 August 2013.

== Medalists ==
Medal	Name	Sport	Event	Date
Gold	Sarah Sjöström	Swimming	Women's 100 m butterfly	29 July
Silver	Sarah Sjöström	Swimming	Women's 100 metre freestyle	2 August

== Diving ==
Men

Athlete	Event	Preliminaries		Semifinals		Final	
Athlete	Event	Points	Rank	Points	Rank	Points	Rank
Vinko Paradzik	1 m springboard	295.10	29	—N/a		did not advance	
Jesper Tolvers	1 m springboard	229.00	42	—N/a		did not advance	
Vinko Paradzik	3 m springboard	330.75	37	did not advance			
Jesper Tolvers	10 m platform	359.10	21	did not advance			

Women

Athlete	Event	Preliminaries		Semifinals		Final	
Athlete	Event	Points	Rank	Points	Rank	Points	Rank
Johanna Johansson	1 m springboard	186.70	37	—N/a		did not advance	
Daniella Nero	1 m springboard	237.15	12 Q	—N/a		206.15	12
Johanna Johansson	3 m springboard	226.05	28	did not advance			
Daniella Nero	3 m springboard	217.80	31	did not advance			

== Swimming ==
Swedish swimmers earned qualifying standards in the following events (up to a maximum of 2 swimmers in each event at the A-standard entry time, and 1 at the B-standard):

Men

Athlete	Event	Heat		Semifinal		Final	
Athlete	Event	Time	Rank	Time	Rank	Time	Rank
Simon Sjödin	200 m individual medley	1:58.02 NR	4 Q	1:58.17	8 Q	1:59.79	8
Simon Sjödin	400 m individual medley	4:21.78	18	—N/a		did not advance	
Johannes Skagius	50 m breaststroke	27.57 NR	15 Q	27.16 NR	5 Q	27.48	7
Johannes Skagius	100 m breaststroke	1:00.94	23	did not advance			

Women

Athlete	Event	Heat		Semifinal		Final	
Athlete	Event	Time	Rank	Time	Rank	Time	Rank
Michelle Coleman	100 m freestyle	54.53	=10 Q	54.62	12	did not advance	
Michelle Coleman	200 m freestyle	1:58.17	13 Q	1:56.90	10	did not advance	
Rebecca Ejdervik	50 m breaststroke	31.39	13 Q	31.73	16	did not advance	
Stina Gardell	200 m individual medley	2:14.02	17	did not advance			
Stina Gardell	400 m individual medley	4:44.50	16	—N/a		did not advance	
Louise Hansson	50 m butterfly	26.71	21	did not advance			
Louise Hansson	100 m butterfly	1:00.11	26	did not advance			
Joline Höstman	100 m breaststroke	1:08.63	23	did not advance			
Joline Höstman	200 m breaststroke	2:28.41	19	did not advance			
Jennie Johansson	50 m breaststroke	30.55 NR	5 Q	30.66	8 Q	30.23 NR	5
Jennie Johansson	100 m breaststroke	1:07.21	8 Q	1:06.96	7 Q	1:07.41	8
Magdalena Kuras	50 m backstroke	29.39	31	did not advance			
Sarah Sjöström	50 m freestyle	24.99	8 Q	24.65	6 Q	24.45	4
Sarah Sjöström	100 m freestyle	53.61	3 Q	52.87 NR	1 Q	52.89	2nd place, silver medalist(s)
Sarah Sjöström	200 m freestyle	1:57.64	9 Q	1:56.38	5 Q	1:56.63	4
Sarah Sjöström	100 m butterfly	57.28	2 Q	57.10	1 Q	56.53	1st place, gold medalist(s)
Michelle Coleman; Louise Hansson; Nathalie Lindborg; Sarah Sjöström	4 × 100 m freestyle relay	3:38.07	4 Q	—N/a		3:36.56	4
Michelle Coleman; Louise Hansson; Joline Höstman; Sarah Sjöström	4 × 100 m medley relay	4:02.83	9	—N/a		did not advance	

== Synchronised swimming ==
Athlete	Event	Preliminaries		Final	
Athlete	Event	Points	Rank	Points	Rank
Malin Gerdin	Solo free routine	76.790	22	did not advance	
Malin Gerdin	Solo technical routine	75.100	22	did not advance	
