= Diving at the 2013 World Aquatics Championships – Women's 1 metre springboard =

Women's 1 metre springboard at the 2013 World Aquatics Championships
- Dates: 21–23 July
- Competitors: 39 from 25 nations
- Winning points: 307.10

Medalists
| gold medal | He Zi | China |
| silver medal | Tania Cagnotto | Italy |
| bronze medal | Wang Han | China |

The women's 1 metre springboard competition at 2013 World Aquatics Championships was held on July 21 with the preliminary round in the afternoon and the final on July 23 in the afternoon session.

== Results ==
The preliminary round was held on July 21 at 14:00 and the final on July 23 at 14:00.

Green denotes finalists

| Rank | Diver | Nationality | Preliminary | | Final | |
| Rank | Diver | Nationality | Points | Rank | Points | Rank |
|---|---|---|---|---|---|---|
| 1st place, gold medalist(s) | He Zi | China | 287.70 | 1 | 307.10 | 1 |
| 2nd place, silver medalist(s) | Tania Cagnotto | Italy | 284.85 | 2 | 307.00 | 2 |
| 3rd place, bronze medalist(s) | Wang Han | China | 284.00 | 3 | 297.75 | 3 |
| 4 | Dolores Hernandez | Mexico | 252.85 | 8 | 272.40 | 4 |
| 5 | Pamela Ware | Canada | 261.45 | 6 | 265.10 | 5 |
| 6 | Tina Punzel | Germany | 260.60 | 7 | 264.50 | 6 |
| 7 | Daria Govor | Russia | 250.80 | 9 | 256.45 | 7 |
| 8 | Uschi Freitag | Netherlands | 239.55 | 10 | 254.60 | 8 |
| 9 | Cheong Jun Hoong | Malaysia | 265.25 | 4 | 245.70 | 9 |
| 10 | Brittany Broben | Australia | 239.20 | 11 | 241.85 | 10 |
| 11 | Deidre Freeman | United States | 263.00 | 5 | 236.30 | 11 |
| 12 | Daniella Nero | Sweden | 237.15 | 12 | 206.15 | 12 |
| 13 | Chan Sharon | Hong Kong | 233.15 | 13 | | |
| 14 | Samantha Pickens | United States | 232.65 | 14 | | |
| 15 | Anastasiia Nedobiga | Ukraine | 230.05 | 15 | | |
| 16 | Arantxa Chávez | Mexico | 228.85 | 16 | | |
| 17 | María Betancourt | Venezuela | 228.80 | 17 | | |
| 18 | Maddison Keeney | Australia | 225.50 | 18 | | |
| 19 | Hannah Starling | Great Britain | 224.75 | 19 | | |
| 20 | Julia Vincent | South Africa | 222.40 | 20 | | |
| 21 | Marion Farissier | France | 222.35 | 21 | | |
| 22 | Sophie Somloi | Austria | 221.70 | 22 | | |
| 23 | Maria Marconi | Italy | 221.55 | 23 | | |
| 24 | Cho Eun-Bi | South Korea | 221.50 | 24 | | |
| 25 | Luisa Jiménez | Puerto Rico | 220.05 | 25 | | |
| 26 | Tiia Kivela | Finland | 215.95 | 26 | | |
| 27 | Kim Chae-Hyon | South Korea | 215.65 | 27 | | |
| 28 | Maria Polyakova | Russia | 215.45 | 28 | | |
| 29 | Leung Sze Man | Hong Kong | 214.75 | 29 | | |
| 30 | Diana Pineda | Colombia | 214.35 | 30 | | |
| 31 | Maxime Eouzan | France | 209.60 | 31 | | |
| 32 | Lei Sio I | Macau | 209.10 | 32 | | |
| 33 | Celine van Duijn | Netherlands | 205.35 | 33 | | |
| 34 | Alicia Blagg | Great Britain | 205.00 | 34 | | |
| 35 | Nicole Gillis | South Africa | 198.70 | 35 | | |
| 36 | Huang En-tien | Chinese Taipei | 189.75 | 36 | | |
| 37 | Johanna Johannson | Sweden | 186.70 | 37 | | |
| 38 | Jenifer Benítez | Spain | 185.00 | 38 | | |
| 39 | Lo I Teng | Macau | 155.40 | 39 | | |
