= Swimming at the 2013 World Aquatics Championships – Women's 100 metre breaststroke =

Women's 100 metre breaststroke at the 2013 World Aquatics Championships
- Venue: Palau Sant Jordi
- Date: July 29, 2013 (heats & semifinals); July 30, 2013 (final)
- Competitors: 59 from 51 nations
- Winning time: 1:04.42

Medalists
gold medal	Rūta Meilutytė	Lithuania
silver medal	Yuliya Yefimova	Russia
bronze medal	Jessica Hardy	United States

Barcelona Palau San Jordi

The women's 100 metre breaststroke event in swimming at the 2013 World Aquatics Championships took place on 29–30 July at the Palau Sant Jordi in Barcelona, Spain.

== Records ==
Prior to this competition, the existing world and championship records were:

World record	Jessica Hardy (USA)	1:04.45	Federal Way, United States	7 August 2009
Competition record	Rebecca Soni (USA)	1:04.84	Rome, Italy	27 July 2009

The following new records were set during this competition.

Date	Event	Name	Nationality	Time	Record
29 July	Heats	Rūta Meilutytė	Lithuania	1:04.52	CR
29 July	Semifinal 2	Rūta Meilutytė	Lithuania	1:04.35	WR

== Results ==
=== Heats ===
The heats were held at 10:30.

Rank	Heat	Lane	Name	Nationality	Time	Notes
1	7	4	Rūta Meilutytė	Lithuania	1:04.52	Q, CR, ER
2	7	5	Jessica Hardy	United States	1:05.18	Q
3	5	5	Yuliya Yefimova	Russia	1:05.24	Q, NR
4	6	4	Rikke Møller Pedersen	Denmark	1:06.30	Q
5	6	3	Viktoriya Solnceva	Ukraine	1:06.79	Q, NR
6	5	4	Breeja Larson	United States	1:06.83	Q
7	6	1	Marina García	Spain	1:07.18	Q, NR
8	7	3	Jennie Johansson	Sweden	1:07.21	Q
9	6	6	Sally Foster	Australia	1:07.59	Q
10	5	3	Alia Atkinson	Jamaica	1:07.76	Q
11	6	5	Satomi Suzuki	Japan	1:07.79	Q
12	5	1	Fiona Doyle	Ireland	1:07.88	Q
13	5	7	Petra Chocová	Czech Republic	1:08.18	Q, NR
14	7	6	Moniek Nijhuis	Netherlands	1:08.29	Q
15	6	2	Samantha Marshall	Australia	1:08.33	Q
16	5	0	Kim Janssens	Belgium	1:08.36	Q, NR
17	7	7	Sun Ye	China	1:08.49	
18	4	3	Amit Ivry	Israel	1:08.52	NR
19	7	8	Lisa Fissneider	Italy	1:08.53	
20	5	8	Shi Jinglin	China	1:08.59	
20	7	9	Jenna Laukkanen	Finland	1:08.59	NR
22	5	2	Sophie Allen	Great Britain	1:08.62	
22	7	0	Caroline Ruhnau	Germany	1:08.62	
24	6	8	Joline Höstman	Sweden	1:08.63	
25	6	7	Anna Belousova	Russia	1:08.69	
26	5	9	Back Su-Yeon	South Korea	1:09.11	
27	5	6	Kanako Watanabe	Japan	1:09.28	
28	7	2	Tera van Beilen	Canada	1:09.45	
29	7	1	Michela Guzzetti	Italy	1:09.54	
30	4	4	Hrafnhildur Lúthersdóttir	Iceland	1:09.75	
31	6	0	Mariia Liver	Ukraine	1:09.95	
32	4	5	Tara-Lynn Nicholas	South Africa	1:10.22	
33	3	4	Yvette Man Yi Kong	Hong Kong	1:10.37	
34	4	6	Julia Sebastian	Argentina	1:10.56	
35	4	2	Erica Dittmer	Mexico	1:10.82	
36	4	7	Samantha Yeo	Singapore	1:11.17	
37	4	1	Siow Yi Ting	Malaysia	1:11.25	
37	4	0	Alona Ribakova	Latvia	1:11.25	
39	6	9	Beatriz Travalon	Brazil	1:11.39	
40	4	9	Caroline Reitshammer	Austria	1:11.43	
41	1	3	Dariya Talanova	Kyrgyzstan	1:11.45	NR
42	4	8	Zuzana Mimovicova	Slovakia	1:11.67	
43	3	5	Ioana Alexandra Popa	Romania	1:11.81	
44	3	7	Daniela Lindemeier	Namibia	1:12.06	
45	3	3	Ivana Ninković	Bosnia and Herzegovina	1:12.39	
46	3	6	Chen I-chuan	Chinese Taipei	1:13.25	
47	3	1	Tatiana Chişca	Moldova	1:14.11	
48	2	6	Vanessa Rivas	Dominican Republic	1:14.77	NR
49	3	8	Evita Leter	Suriname	1:15.31	
50	3	2	Irene Chrysostomou	Cyprus	1:15.45	
51	2	3	Barbara Vali-Skelton	Papua New Guinea	1:16.03	
52	3	0	Jamila Lunkuse	Uganda	1:16.15	
53	2	4	Natalia Gomez	Costa Rica	1:16.96	
54	2	7	Lianna Swan	Pakistan	1:19.61	NR
55	2	2	Rachael Tonjor	Nigeria	1:19.81	
56	2	5	Chade Nersicio	Netherlands Antilles	1:21.47	
57	2	8	Bonita Imsirovic	Botswana	1:21.97	
58	2	1	Mira Shami	Jordan	1:22.05	
59	1	4	Shne Joachim	Saint Vincent and the Grenadines	1:23.09	
60	1	5	Charmel Sogbadji	Benin	1:43.41	
60	1	6	Ramatoulaye Camara	Guinea	1:43.41	
	3	9	Ngô Thị Ngọc Quỳnh	Vietnam		DNS

=== Semifinals ===
The semifinals were held at 18:29.

==== Semifinal 1 ====
Rank	Lane	Name	Nationality	Time	Notes
1	5	Rikke Møller Pedersen	Denmark	1:05.99	Q
2	4	Jessica Hardy	United States	1:06.10	Q
3	3	Breeja Larson	United States	1:06.61	Q
4	6	Jennie Johansson	Sweden	1:06.96	Q, NR
5	2	Alia Atkinson	Jamaica	1:07.63	
6	1	Moniek Nijhuis	Netherlands	1:07.77	
7	7	Fiona Doyle	Ireland	1:07.81	
8	8	Kim Janssens	Belgium	1:08.73	

==== Semifinal 2 ====
Rank	Lane	Name	Nationality	Time	Notes
1	4	Rūta Meilutytė	Lithuania	1:04.35	Q, WR
2	5	Yuliya Yefimova	Russia	1:05.29	Q
3	3	Viktoriya Solnceva	Ukraine	1:06.67	Q, NR
4	6	Marina García	Spain	1:07.12	Q, NR
5	7	Satomi Suzuki	Japan	1:07.83	
6	2	Sally Foster	Australia	1:08.04	
7	1	Petra Chocová	Czech Republic	1:08.10	
8	8	Samantha Marshall	Australia	1:08.31	

=== Final ===
The final was held at 19:48.

Rank	Lane	Name	Nationality	Time	Notes
1st place, gold medalist(s)	4	Rūta Meilutytė	Lithuania	1:04.42	
2nd place, silver medalist(s)	5	Yuliya Yefimova	Russia	1:05.02	NR
3rd place, bronze medalist(s)	6	Jessica Hardy	United States	1:05.52	
4	3	Rikke Møller Pedersen	Denmark	1:05.93	
5	2	Breeja Larson	United States	1:06.74	
6	7	Viktoriya Solnceva	Ukraine	1:06.81	
7	8	Marina García	Spain	1:07.08	NR
8	1	Jennie Johansson	Sweden	1:07.41	
