= Synchronised swimming at the 2013 World Aquatics Championships – Solo technical routine =

Solo technical routine at the Synchronised swimming at the 2013 World Aquatics Championships
- Dates: 20 July
- Competitors: 35 from 35 nations
- Winning points: 96.800

Medalists
gold medal	Svetlana Romashina	Russia
silver medal	Huang Xuechen	China
bronze medal	Ona Carbonell	Spain

Barcelona Palau San Jordi

The solo technical routine competition at 2013 World Aquatics Championships was held on July 20 with the preliminary round in the morning and the final in the evening session.

== Results ==
The preliminary round was held at 09:00 and the final at 19:00.

Green denotes finalists

Rank	Swimmer	Nationality	Preliminary		Final	
Rank	Swimmer	Nationality	Points	Rank	Points	Rank
1st place, gold medalist(s)	Svetlana Romashina	Russia	96.200	1	96.800	1
2nd place, silver medalist(s)	Huang Xuechen	China	95.100	2	95.500	2
3rd place, bronze medalist(s)	Ona Carbonell	Spain	94.200	3	94.400	3
4	Anna Voloshyna	Ukraine	92.100	4	92.900	4
5	Yukiko Inui	Japan	91.800	5	91.900	5
6	Chloé Isaac	Canada	91.000	6	90.600	6
7	Despoina Solomou	Greece	88.500	7	89.600	7
8	Linda Cerruti	Italy	88.400	8	89.200	8
9	Jenna Randall	Great Britain	87.500	10	87.500	9
10	Mary Killman	United States	88.100	9	87.300	10
11	Soňa Bernardová	Czech Republic	84.900	11	85.200	11
12	Kang Un-Ha	North Korea	84.400	12	85.100	12
13	Margot de Graaf	Netherlands	83.400	13	83.400	13
14	Pamela Fischer	Switzerland	83.400	13	82.700	14
15	Nadine Brandl	Austria	82.100	15	81.900	15
16	Kyra Felßner	Germany	79.100	16	80.100	16
17	Etel Sánchez	Argentina	78.900	17		
18	Jana Labáthová	Slovakia	78.800	18		
19	Reem Abdalazem	Egypt	77.200	19		
20	Jennifer Cerquera	Colombia	77.100	20		
21	Iryna Limanouskaya	Belarus	76.800	21		
22	Greisy Gomez	Venezuela	75.100	22		
22	Malin Gerdin	Sweden	75.100	22		
24	Kalina Yordanova	Bulgaria	74.900	24		
25	Anastasiya Ruzmetova	Uzbekistan	74.000	25		
26	Ana Cekić	Serbia	71.500	26		
26	Anouk Eman	Aruba	71.500	26		
28	Violeta Mitinian	Costa Rica	71.300	28		
29	Kirstin Anderson	New Zealand	69.900	29		
30	Lim Hyun-Ji	South Korea	69.200	30		
31	Au Ieong Sin Ieng	Macau	67.200	31		
32	Kerry Beth Norden	South Africa	62.600	32		
32	Jennifer Quintana	Cuba	62.600	32		
34	Claudia Megawati Suyanto	Indonesia	61.200	34		
35	Dhitaya Tanabunsombat	Thailand	55.200	35		
