= China at the 2013 World Aquatics Championships =

- Flag of China
- World Aquatics code: CHN
- National federation: Chinese Swimming Association
- Website: swimmingsport.org.cn

in Barcelona, Spain
- Medals Ranked 2nd: Gold 14 Silver 8 Bronze 4 Total 26

World Aquatics Championships appearances
- 1973; 1975; 1978; 1982; 1986; 1991; 1994; 1998; 2001; 2003; 2005; 2007; 2009; 2011; 2013; 2015; 2017; 2019; 2022; 2023; 2024; 2025

People's Republic of China competed at the 2013 World Aquatics Championships in Barcelona, Spain on July 20 to August 4, 2013.

== Medalists ==
Medal	Name	Sport	Event	Date
Gold	Shi Tingmao; Wu Minxia	Diving	Women's 3 m synchronized springboard	20 July
Gold	Li Shixin	Diving	Men's 1 m springboard	23 July
Gold	Chen Ruolin; Liu Huixia	Diving	Women's 10 m synchronized platform	22 July
Gold	He Chong; Qin Kai	Diving	Men's 3 m synchronized springboard	23 July
Gold	He Zi	Diving	Women's 1 m springboard	23 July
Gold	Si Yajie	Diving	Women's 10 m platform	25 July
Gold	He Chong	Diving	Men's 3 m springboard	26 July
Gold	He Zi	Diving	Women's 3 m springboard	27 July
Gold	Qiu Bo	Diving	Men's 10 m platform	28 July
Gold	Sun Yang	Swimming	Men's 400 m freestyle	28 July
Gold	Sun Yang	Swimming	Men's 800 m freestyle	31 July
Gold	Liu Zige	Swimming	Women's 200 m butterfly	1 August
Gold	Zhao Jing	Swimming	Women's 50 m backstroke	1 August
Gold	Sun Yang	Swimming	Men's 1500 m freestyle	4 August
Silver	Huang Xuechen	Synchronized swimming	Solo technical routine	20 July
Silver	Jiang Tingting; Jiang Wenwen	Synchronized swimming	Duet technical routine	21 July
Silver	Huang Xuechen	Synchronized swimming	Solo free routine	24 July
Silver	Chen Ruolin	Diving	Women's 10 m platform	25 July
Silver	Jiang Tingting; Jiang Wenwen	Synchronized swimming	Duet free routine	25 July
Silver	Wang Han	Diving	Women's 3 m springboard	27 July
Silver	Fu Yuanhui	Swimming	Women's 50 m backstroke	1 August
Silver	Lu Ying	Swimming	Women's 50 m butterfly	3 August
Bronze	Cao Yuan; Zhang Yanquan	Diving	Men's 10 m synchronized platform	21 July
Bronze	Wang Han	Diving	Women's 1 m springboard	23 July
Bronze	Wu Peng	Swimming	Men's 200 m butterfly	31 July
Bronze	Hao Yun; Li Yunqi; Lü Zhiwu*; Sun Yang; Wang Shun	Swimming	Men's 4 × 200 m freestyle relay	2 August

== Diving ==
Chinese divers are eligible for two spots in each individual event (1 m, 3 m, and 10 m) and one team spot for each synchronized event (3 m and 10 m).

Men

Athlete	Event	Preliminaries		Semifinals		Final	
Athlete	Event	Points	Rank	Points	Rank	Points	Rank
Li Shixin	1 m springboard	405.00	1 Q	—N/a		460.95	1st place, gold medalist(s)
Sun Zhiyi	1 m springboard	377.15	7 Q	—N/a		425.05	4
He Chong	3 m springboard	421.85	6 Q	483.15	2 Q	544.95	1st place, gold medalist(s)
Qin Kai	3 m springboard	417.50	9 Q	493.65	1 Q	473.25	5
Qiu Bo	10 m platform	524.40	1 Q	457.55	6 Q	581.00	1st place, gold medalist(s)
Lin Yue	10 m platform	456.00	6 Q	387.10	17	Did not advance	
He Chong; Qin Kai	3 m synchronized springboard	454.32	1 Q	—N/a		448.86	1st place, gold medalist(s)
Cao Yuan; Zhang Yanquan	10 m synchronized platform	460.74	1 Q	—N/a		445.56	3rd place, bronze medalist(s)

Women

Athlete	Event	Preliminaries		Semifinals		Final	
Athlete	Event	Points	Rank	Points	Rank	Points	Rank
He Zi	1 m springboard	287.70	1 Q	—N/a		307.10	1st place, gold medalist(s)
Wang Han	1 m springboard	284.00	3 Q	—N/a		297.75	3rd place, bronze medalist(s)
He Zi	3 m springboard	341.50	1 Q	370.00	1 Q	383.40	1st place, gold medalist(s)
Wang Han	3 m springboard	321.00	2 Q	362.40	2 Q	356.25	2nd place, silver medalist(s)
Si Yajie	10 m platform	360.35	1 Q	341.85	3 Q	392.15	1st place, gold medalist(s)
Chen Ruolin	10 m platform	350.60	3 Q	373.65	1 Q	388.70	2nd place, silver medalist(s)
Shi Tingmao; Wu Minxia	3 m synchronized springboard	334.20	1 Q	—N/a		338.40	1st place, gold medalist(s)
Chen Ruolin; Liu Huixia	10 m synchronized platform	340.92	1 Q	—N/a		356.28	1st place, gold medalist(s)

== Open water swimming ==
China has qualified the following swimmers in open water marathon.

Men

Athlete	Event	Time	Rank
Han Lidu	25 km	DNF	
Lang Yuanpeng	5 km	54:02.4	35
Weng Jingwei	25 km	5:04:02.5	29
Xu Wenchao	5 km	54:01.0	31
Zhang Zibin	10 km	1:50:55.4	41
Zu Lijun	10 km	DSQ	

Women

Athlete	Event	Time	Rank
Cao Shiyue	5 km	57:19.5	20
Fang Yanqiao	5 km	57:07.0	19
Fang Yanqiao	10 km	1:58:23.2	7
Lei Shan	25 km	5:16:34.3	9
Shi Yu	10 km	1:58:43.8	26
Yang Dandan	25 km	5:19:13.7	11

Mixed

Athlete	Event	Time	Rank
Han Lidu; Weng Jingwei; Cao Shiyue	Team	58:02.6	14

== Swimming ==
Chinese swimmers achieved qualifying standards in the following events (up to a maximum of 2 swimmers in each event at the A-standard entry time, and 1 at the B-standard): The official roster also featured Olympic champions Sun Yang, Ye Shiwen, and Jiao Liuyang.

Men

Athlete	Event	Heat		Semifinal		Final	
Athlete	Event	Time	Rank	Time	Rank	Time	Rank
Chen Yin	200 m butterfly	1:56.48	5 Q	1:55.97	=4 Q	1:55.47	4
Cheng Feiyi	50 m backstroke	25.83	21	Did not advance			
Cheng Feiyi	100 m backstroke	54.30	13 Q	54.20	14	Did not advance	
Gu Biaorong	50 m breaststroke	27.38	7 Q	27.53	=10	Did not advance	
Gu Biaorong	100 m breaststroke	1:01.08	25	Did not advance			
Hao Yun	400 m freestyle	3:47.49	6 Q	—N/a		3:48.88	8
Hao Yun	1500 m freestyle	15:24.63	24	—N/a		Did not advance	
Li Xiayan	50 m breaststroke	DSQ		Did not advance			
Li Yunqi	200 m freestyle	1:48.18	14 Q	1:47.36	10	Did not advance	
Liu Weijia	100 m butterfly	54.37	36	Did not advance			
Lü Zhiwu	50 m freestyle	23.64	51	Did not advance			
Lü Zhiwu	100 m freestyle	49.85	29	Did not advance			
Mao Feilian	200 m breaststroke	2:11.81	17	Did not advance			
Mao Feilian	200 m individual medley	1:59.68	15 Q	1:59.65	14	Did not advance	
Shi Yi	400 m individual medley	4:25.42	29	—N/a		Did not advance	
Sun Xiaolei	50 m backstroke	25.01	=8 Q	24.95	=7 Q	24.76	5
Sun Yang	400 m freestyle	3:44.67	1 Q	—N/a		3:41.59	1st place, gold medalist(s)
Sun Yang	800 m freestyle	7:49.37	2 Q	—N/a		7:41.36	1st place, gold medalist(s)
Sun Yang	1500 m freestyle	14:54.65	1 Q	—N/a		14:41.15	1st place, gold medalist(s)
Wang Shun	200 m freestyle	1:48.19	15 Q	1:47.84	14	Did not advance	
Wang Shun	200 m individual medley	1:57.83	3 Q	1:57.80	5 Q	1:56.86	4
Wu Peng	50 m butterfly	23.43	10 Q	23.87	16	Did not advance	
Wu Peng	200 m butterfly	1:56.96	10 Q	1:55.42	2 Q	1:55.09	3rd place, bronze medalist(s)
Xu Jiayu	100 m backstroke	53.63	3 Q	53.84	10	Did not advance	
Xu Jiayu	200 m backstroke	1:58.29	12 Q	1:56.42	6 Q	1:57.13	7
Chen Zuo; Lü Zhiwu; Lou Junyi; Shi Tengfei	4 × 100 m freestyle relay	3:17.32	10	—N/a		Did not advance	
Hao Yun; Li Yunqi; Lü Zhiwu*; Sun Yang; Wang Shun	4 × 200 m freestyle relay	7:13.37	8 Q	—N/a		7:04.74	3rd place, bronze medalist(s)
Gu Biaorong; Lü Zhiwu; Xu Jiayu; Wu Peng	4 × 100 m medley relay	3.35.95	10	—N/a		Did not advance	

Women

Athlete	Event	Heat		Semifinal		Final	
Athlete	Event	Time	Rank	Time	Rank	Time	Rank
Bai Anqi	200 m backstroke	2:12.14	16 Q	2:11.18	12	Did not advance	
Chen Xinyi	400 m individual medley	4:39.54	10	—N/a		Did not advance	
Fu Yuanhui	50 m backstroke	27.55	1 Q	27.40	1 Q	27.39	2nd place, silver medalist(s)
Fu Yuanhui	100 m backstroke	1:00.01	4 Q	59.82	5 Q	59.61	5
He Yuzhe	50 m breaststroke	31.46	14 Q	31.67	15	Did not advance	
Jiao Liuyang	100 m butterfly	59.21	17	Did not advance			
Jiao Liuyang	200 m butterfly	2:07.79	5 Q	2:07.70	7 Q	2:06.65	6
Liu Zige	200 m butterfly	2:07.63	4 Q	2:07.18	4 Q	2:04.59	1st place, gold medalist(s)
Lu Ying	50 m butterfly	25.82	3 Q	26.12	=7 Q	25.42 AS	2nd place, silver medalist(s)
Lu Ying	100 m butterfly	58.93	12 Q	58.67	11	Did not advance	
Qiu Yuhan	100 m freestyle	54.93	15 Q	55.61	16	Did not advance	
Qiu Yuhan	200 m freestyle	1:58.38	14 Q	1:59.20	15	Did not advance	
Shao Yiwen	400 m freestyle	4:09.16	12	—N/a		Did not advance	
Shao Yiwen	800 m freestyle	8:29.71	12	—N/a		Did not advance	
Shen Duo	200 m freestyle	2:00.82	26	Did not advance			
Shi Jinglin	100 m breaststroke	1:08.59	=20	Did not advance			
Shi Jinglin	200 m breaststroke	2:25.73	7 Q	2:25.52	9	Did not advance	
Sun Ye	100 m breaststroke	1:08.49	17	Did not advance			
Suo Ran	50 m breaststroke	31.70	24	Did not advance			
Tang Yi	50 m freestyle	25.72	26	Did not advance			
Tang Yi	100 m freestyle	54.21	=6 Q	54.09	8 Q	54.27	7
Xu Danlu	800 m freestyle	8:29.98	14	—N/a		Did not advance	
Xu Danlu	1500 m freestyle	16:05.59	8 Q	—N/a		16:00.44	5
Ye Shiwen	200 m individual medley	2:10.20	2 Q	2:09.12	2 Q	2:10.48	4
Ye Shiwen	400 m individual medley	4:34.93	=3 Q	—N/a		4:38.51	7
Yin Fan	50 m freestyle	25.87	=30	Did not advance			
Zhang Wenqing	400 m freestyle	4:14.66	20	—N/a		Did not advance	
Zhang Wenqing	200 m individual medley	2:13.40	12 Q	2:11.34	10	Did not advance	
Zhao Jing	50 m backstroke	27.81	2 Q	27.87	4 Q	27.29	1st place, gold medalist(s)
Zhou Yanxin	100 m backstroke	1:00.99	13 Q	1:00.85	11	Did not advance	
Chen Xinyi; Pang Jiaying; Qiu Yuhan; Wang Haibing	4 × 100 m freestyle relay	3:39.29	9	—N/a		Did not advance	
Guo Junjun; Qiu Yuhan; Shao Yiwen; Ye Shiwen; Zhang Wenqing*	4 × 200 m freestyle relay	7:52.50	1 Q	—N/a		7:49.79	4
Fu Yuanhui; Lu Ying; Sun Ye; Tang Yi	4 × 100 m medley relay	3:59.39	3 Q	—N/a		3:57.30	4

== Synchronized swimming ==
China has qualified the following synchronized swimmers.

Athlete	Event	Preliminaries		Final	
Athlete	Event	Points	Rank	Points	Rank
Huang Xuechen	Solo free routine	95.280	2 Q	95.720	2nd place, silver medalist(s)
Huang Xuechen	Solo technical routine	95.100	2 Q	95.500	2nd place, silver medalist(s)
Jiang Tingting; Jiang Wenwen	Duet free routine	95.080	2 Q	95.350	2nd place, silver medalist(s)
Jiang Tingting; Jiang Wenwen	Duet technical routine	94.800	2 Q	94.900	2nd place, silver medalist(s)

== Water polo ==
=== Men's tournament ===
Team roster

- Ge Weiqing
- Tan Feihu
- Liang Zhongxing
- Jiang Bin
- Guo Junliang
- Pan Ning
- Li Bin
- Wang Yang
- Xie Junmin
- Zhang Jian
- Zhang Chufeng
- Liang Nianxiang
- Wu Honghui

Group play

	Pld	W	D	L	GF	GA	GD	Pts
Serbia	3	3	0	0	39	26	+13	6
Hungary	3	1	1	1	32	27	+5	3
Australia	3	1	1	1	25	26	−1	3
China	3	0	0	3	21	38	−17	0

22 July 2013; 17:30	Report	Hungary	13–5	China	Piscines Bernat Picornell, Barcelona; Attendance: 500; Referees: Margeta (SLO), Mellirar (RSA)
22 July 2013; 17:30	Report	Score by quarters: 3–1, 4–1, 3–2, 3–1			Piscines Bernat Picornell, Barcelona; Attendance: 500; Referees: Margeta (SLO), Mellirar (RSA)
22 July 2013; 17:30	Report	Szivós 5	Goals	five players 1	Piscines Bernat Picornell, Barcelona; Attendance: 500; Referees: Margeta (SLO), Mellirar (RSA)

24 July 2013; 12:10	Report	China	7–9	Australia	Piscines Bernat Picornell, Barcelona; Attendance: 455; Referees: Naumov (RUS), Abramović (MNE)
24 July 2013; 12:10	Report	Score by quarters: 1–4, 1–2, 1–2, 4–1			Piscines Bernat Picornell, Barcelona; Attendance: 455; Referees: Naumov (RUS), Abramović (MNE)
24 July 2013; 12:10	Report	Zhang Jian 2	Goals	Howden 3	Piscines Bernat Picornell, Barcelona; Attendance: 455; Referees: Naumov (RUS), Abramović (MNE)

26 July 2013; 09:30	Report	Serbia	16–9	China	Piscines Bernat Picornell, Barcelona; Attendance: 350; Referees: Williams (NZL), Moller (ARG)
26 July 2013; 09:30	Report	Score by quarters: 4–3, 4–2, 5–3, 3–1			Piscines Bernat Picornell, Barcelona; Attendance: 350; Referees: Williams (NZL), Moller (ARG)
26 July 2013; 09:30	Report	Mitrović 4	Goals	three players 2	Piscines Bernat Picornell, Barcelona; Attendance: 350; Referees: Williams (NZL), Moller (ARG)

Round of 16

28 July 2013; 20:10	Report	Italy	11–3	China	Piscines Bernat Picornell, Barcelona; Attendance: 600; Referees: Margeta (SLO), Terepenka (CAN)
28 July 2013; 20:10	Report	Score by quarters: 3–1, 3–1, 3–0, 2–1			Piscines Bernat Picornell, Barcelona; Attendance: 600; Referees: Margeta (SLO), Terepenka (CAN)
28 July 2013; 20:10	Report	Giorgetti 4	Goals	three players 1	Piscines Bernat Picornell, Barcelona; Attendance: 600; Referees: Margeta (SLO), Terepenka (CAN)

=== Women's tournament ===
Team roster

- Yang Jun
- Teng Fei
- Liu Ping
- Sun Yujun
- He Jin
- Sun Yating
- Song Donglun
- Xu Lu
- Mei Xiaohan
- Ma Huanhuan
- Zhang Cong
- Xia Qun
- Wang Ying

Group play

	Pld	W	D	L	GF	GA	GD	Pts
Australia	3	3	0	0	45	10	+35	6
China	3	2	0	1	35	21	+14	4
New Zealand	3	1	0	2	22	35	−13	2
South Africa	3	0	0	3	10	46	−36	0

21 July 2013; 12:10	Report	China	17–2	South Africa	Piscines Bernat Picornell, Barcelona; Attendance: 150; Referees: Drury, Littlejohn (GBR)
21 July 2013; 12:10	Report	Score by quarters: 4–0, 4–0, 5–0, 4–2			Piscines Bernat Picornell, Barcelona; Attendance: 150; Referees: Drury, Littlejohn (GBR)
21 July 2013; 12:10	Report	Ma Huanhuan 5	Goals	L. Keet, M. Keet 1	Piscines Bernat Picornell, Barcelona; Attendance: 150; Referees: Drury, Littlejohn (GBR)

23 July 2013; 10:50	Report	Australia	14–5	China	Piscines Bernat Picornell, Barcelona; Attendance: 400; Referees: Bianchi (ITA), Bender (GER)
23 July 2013; 10:50	Report	Score by quarters: 1–3, 3–2, 6–0, 4–0			Piscines Bernat Picornell, Barcelona; Attendance: 400; Referees: Bianchi (ITA), Bender (GER)
23 July 2013; 10:50	Report	McGhie 3	Goals	Liu Ping 2	Piscines Bernat Picornell, Barcelona; Attendance: 400; Referees: Bianchi (ITA), Bender (GER)

25 July 2013; 20:10	Report	China	13–5	New Zealand	Piscines Bernat Picornell, Barcelona; Attendance: 400; Referees: Cardenuto (BRA), Littlejohn (GBR)
25 July 2013; 20:10	Report	Score by quarters: 2–0, 4–1, 5–3, 2–1			Piscines Bernat Picornell, Barcelona; Attendance: 400; Referees: Cardenuto (BRA), Littlejohn (GBR)
25 July 2013; 20:10	Report	Sun Yujun, Song Donglun 3	Goals	Myles 2	Piscines Bernat Picornell, Barcelona; Attendance: 400; Referees: Cardenuto (BRA), Littlejohn (GBR)

Round of 16

27 July 2013; 12:10	Report	China	10–11	Netherlands	Piscines Bernat Picornell, Barcelona; Attendance: 300; Referees: Bender (GER), Flahive (AUS)
27 July 2013; 12:10	Report	Score by quarters: 2–2, 2–4, 3–2, 3–3			Piscines Bernat Picornell, Barcelona; Attendance: 300; Referees: Bender (GER), Flahive (AUS)
27 July 2013; 12:10	Report	Ma Huanhuan 4	Goals	Smit, Klaassen 3	Piscines Bernat Picornell, Barcelona; Attendance: 300; Referees: Bender (GER), Flahive (AUS)
