= Giulio Zorzi =

South African swimmer (born 1989)

Personal information
- Nationality: South Africa
- Born: 3 January 1989 (age 37) Johannesburg, South Africa
- Height: 1.90 m (6 ft 3 in)

Sport
- Sport: Swimming
- Strokes: Breaststroke
- Club: Northern Tigers Swimming
- Coach: Grant Kritzinger
Medal record
Men's swimming
Representing South Africa
World Championships (LC)
Bronze medal – third place	2013 Barcelona	50 m breaststroke
Summer Universiade
Gold medal – first place	2013 Kazan	50 m breaststroke

Giulio Zorzi (born 3 January 1989 in Johannesburg) is a South African swimmer who specializes in breaststroke events. At the 2013 FINA World Championships in Barcelona, Spain, Zorzi handed the entire medal haul for the South Africans with a one-three finish, as he picked up the bronze in 27.04.

== Biography ==
Zorzi was brought up in Pretoria with a strong Italian influence at home, due to his father's origins. From an early age he started swimming and training with Olympic gold medallist and Elite Team member Cameron van der Burgh, who has become a close friend.

After steady progress in 2011-12 international competition, 2013 emerged as Zorzi's breakthrough year as he won 50m breaststroke gold at the 2013 Summer Universiade in Kazan, Russia, before going on to the 2013 FINA World Championships in Barcelona, Spain, two weeks later. Having finished sixth in the heats, he had a difficult semi-final, but nonetheless qualified in the eighth spot for the final. Zorzi surprised everyone by finishing third from lane 8, one-hundredth of a second ahead of fourth place. The result delighted Van Der Burgh, who called Zorzi up alongside him on the podium to sing the South African anthem arm-in-arm.

Along with Van Der Burgh, Zorzi is coached by German Dirk Lange, who is based in Austria and only sees his protégés a few times a year. He trains at the Players Swim Club in Pretoria under the guidance of local coach Grant Kritzinger.
