= Anna Belousova =

Russian swimmer

Personal information
- Born: August 23, 1996 (age 30)

Sport
- Sport: Swimming
- Strokes: Breaststroke
- College team: Texas A&M Aggies

Anna Belousova (Russian: Анна Белоусова; born 23 August 1996) is a female Russian swimmer. She is the 2019 Russian National Champion at 100 meters breaststroke.

== Early life and education ==
Belousova was born in Russia on 23 August 1996. Since 2017, she has been a student Texas A&M University, planning to major in leadership.

== Career ==
In swimming, Belousova won the 100 metres breastroke gold medal at the 2019 Russian National Championships in Moscow, Russia, on 12 April. Belousova is a member of the Aggie Swim Club.
