= Swimming at the 2013 World Aquatics Championships =

- Host city: Barcelona, Spain
- Date: 28 July – 4 August
- Venue: Palau Sant Jordi
- Events: 40

The swimming events of the 15th FINA World Aquatics Championships were held 28 July–4 August 2013, in Barcelona, Spain. The competition was held in a long course pool inside the Palau Sant Jordi. It featured 40 LCM events, split evenly between males and females. Swimming was one of the five aquatic disciplines at the championships.

The United States won the overall medal count, led by Missy Franklin who claimed six gold medals, the most by a female athlete in the history of the championships. China's Sun Yang won three gold medals en route to "male swimmer of the meet". Katie Ledecky, from the United States, was named "female swimmer of the meet" after setting two world records and winning four gold medals. Four other world records were broken during the competition, each in the women's breaststroke events.

== Qualifying criteria ==
If a nation entered one competitor in an event then they only have to meet the B standard, but if they enter two competitors then in an event then they both have to meet the A standard. Each member nation can enter one relay team in each event. Qualifying standards must have been met between 1 July 2012, and 1 July 2013.

The time standards for the 2013 FINA World Championships
Men		Event	Women	
A standard (2 entries)	B standard (1 entry)	Event	A standard (2 entries)	B standard (1 entry)
22.33	23.11	50 freestyle	25.34	26.29
48.93	50.64	100 freestyle	54.86	56.78
1:48.42	1:52.21	200 freestyle	1:58.74	2:02.90
3:49.55	3:57.58	400 freestyle	4:09.81	4:18.55
7:59.06	8:15.83	800 freestyle	8:34.33	8:52.33
15:14.38	15:46.38	1500 freestyle	16:26.36	17:00.88
25.43	26.32	50 backstroke	28.84	29.85
54.43	56.34	100 backstroke	1:01.39	1:03.54
1:58.48	2:02.63	200 backstroke	2:11.09	2:15.68
28.00	28.98	50 breaststroke	32.00	33.12
1:00.86	1:02.99	100 breaststroke	1:08.63	1:11.03
2:12.78	2:17.43	200 breaststroke	2:27.88	2:33.06
23.96	24.80	50 butterfly	26.83	27.77
52.57	54.41	100 butterfly	58.89	1:00.95
1:57.03	2:01.13	200 butterfly	2:09.38	2:13.91
1:59.99	2:04.19	200 individual medley	2:14.97	2:19.69
4:18.99	4:28.05	400 individual medley	4:44.53	4:54.49

Competition format:

- events 200 meters and under: preliminaries-semifinals-finals (top 16 finishers from prelims advanced to semifinals; top-8 in the semifinals advanced to the final).
- events 400 meters and longer: prelims/final (top 8 finishers from prelims advanced to the final).

== Schedule ==
Date	Time	Round
28 July 2013	10:00	Women's 100 m butterfly heats
28 July 2013	10:00	Men's 400 m freestyle heats
28 July 2013	10:00	Women's 200 m individual medley heats
28 July 2013	10:00	Men's 50 m butterfly heats
28 July 2013	10:00	Women's 400 m freestyle heats
28 July 2013	10:00	Men's 100 m breaststroke heats
28 July 2013	10:00	Women's 4 × 100 m freestyle heats
28 July 2013	10:00	Men's 4 × 100 m freestyle heats
28 July 2013	18:00	Women's 100 m butterfly semifinals
28 July 2013	18:00	Men's 400 m freestyle final
28 July 2013	18:00	Women's 200 m individual medley semifinals
28 July 2013	18:00	Men's 50 m butterfly semifinals
28 July 2013	18:00	Women's 400 m freestyle final
28 July 2013	18:00	Men's 100 m breaststroke semifinals
28 July 2013	18:00	Women's 4 × 100 m freestyle final
28 July 2013	18:00	Men's 4 × 100 m freestyle final
29 July 2013	10:00	Women's 100 m backstroke heats
29 July 2013	10:00	Men's 100 m backstroke heats
29 July 2013	10:00	Women's 100 m breaststroke heats
29 July 2013	10:00	Men's 200 m freestyle heats
29 July 2013	10:00	Women's 1500 m freestyle heats
29 July 2013	18:00	Men's 100 m breaststroke final
29 July 2013	18:00	Women's 100 m butterfly final
29 July 2013	18:00	Men's 100 m backstroke semifinals
29 July 2013	18:00	Women's 100 m breaststroke semifinals
29 July 2013	18:00	Men's 50 m butterfly final
29 July 2013	18:00	Women's 100 m backstroke semifinals
29 July 2013	18:00	Men's 200 m freestyle semifinals
29 July 2013	18:00	Women's 200 m individual medley final
30 July 2013	10:00	Men's 50 m breaststroke heats
30 July 2013	10:00	Women's 200 m freestyle heats
30 July 2013	10:00	Men's 200 m butterfly heats
30 July 2013	10:00	Men's 800 m freestyle heats
30 July 2013	18:00	Men's 200 m freestyle final
30 July 2013	18:00	Women's 100 m backstroke final
30 July 2013	18:00	Men's 50 m breaststroke semifinals
30 July 2013	18:00	Women's 1500 m freestyle final
30 July 2013	18:00	Men's 100 m backstroke final
30 July 2013	18:00	Women's 200 m freestyle semifinals
30 July 2013	18:00	Men's 200 m butterfly semifinals
30 July 2013	18:00	Women's 100 m breaststroke final
31 July 2013	10:00	Women's 50 m backstroke heats
31 July 2013	10:00	Men's 100 m freestyle heats
31 July 2013	10:00	Women's 200 m butterfly heats
31 July 2013	10:00	Men's 200 m individual medley heats
31 July 2013	18:00	Men's 100 m freestyle semifinals
31 July 2013	18:00	Women's 50 m backstroke semifinals
31 July 2013	18:00	Men's 200 m butterfly final
31 July 2013	18:00	Women's 200 m freestyle final
31 July 2013	18:00	Men's 50 m breaststroke final
31 July 2013	18:00	Women's 200 m butterfly semifinals
31 July 2013	18:00	Men's 200 m individual medley semifinals
31 July 2013	18:00	Men's 800 m freestyle final

Date	Time	Round
1 August 2013	10:00	Women's 100 m freestyle heats
1 August 2013	10:00	Men's 200 m backstroke heats
1 August 2013	10:00	Women's 200 m breaststroke heats
1 August 2013	10:00	Men's 200 m breaststroke heats
1 August 2013	10:00	Women's 4 × 200 m freestyle heats
1 August 2013	18:00	Women's 100 m freestyle semifinals
1 August 2013	18:00	Men's 200 m individual medley final
1 August 2013	18:00	Women's 200 m breaststroke semifinals
1 August 2013	18:00	Men's 100 m freestyle final
1 August 2013	18:00	Women's 200 m butterfly final
1 August 2013	18:00	Men's 200 m breaststroke semifinals
1 August 2013	18:00	Women's 50 m backstroke final
1 August 2013	18:00	Men's 200 m backstroke semifinals
1 August 2013	18:00	Women's 4 × 200 m freestyle final
2 August 2013	10:00	Men's 50 m freestyle heats
2 August 2013	10:00	Women's 50 m butterfly heats
2 August 2013	10:00	Men's 100 m butterfly heats
2 August 2013	10:00	Women's 200 m backstroke heats
2 August 2013	10:00	Men's 4 × 200 m freestyle heats
2 August 2013	10:00	Women's 800 m freestyle heats
2 August 2013	18:00	Women's 100 m freestyle final
2 August 2013	18:00	Men's 200 m backstroke final
2 August 2013	18:00	Women's 200 m backstroke semifinals
2 August 2013	18:00	Men's 50 m freestyle semifinals
2 August 2013	18:00	Women's 200 m breaststroke final
2 August 2013	18:00	Men's 100 m butterfly semifinals
2 August 2013	18:00	Women's 50 m butterfly semifinals
2 August 2013	18:00	Men's 200 m breaststroke final
2 August 2013	18:00	Men's 4 × 200 m freestyle final
3 August 2013	10:00	Women's 50 m freestyle heats
3 August 2013	10:00	Men's 50 m backstroke heats
3 August 2013	10:00	Women's 50 m breaststroke heats
3 August 2013	10:00	Men's 1500 m freestyle heats
3 August 2013	18:00	Women's 50 m butterfly final
3 August 2013	18:00	Men's 50 m freestyle final
3 August 2013	18:00	Women's 200 m backstroke final
3 August 2013	18:00	Women's 50 m breaststroke semifinals
3 August 2013	18:00	Men's 100 m butterfly final
3 August 2013	18:00	Women's 50 m freestyle semifinals
3 August 2013	18:00	Men's 50 m backstroke semifinals
3 August 2013	18:00	Women's 800 m freestyle final
4 August 2013	10:00	Men's 400 m individual medley heats
4 August 2013	10:00	Women's 400 m individual medley heats
4 August 2013	10:00	Men's 4 × 100 m medley heats
4 August 2013	10:00	Women's 4 × 100 m medley heats
4 August 2013	18:00	Men's 50 m backstroke final
4 August 2013	18:00	Women's 50 m breaststroke final
4 August 2013	18:00	Men's 400 m individual medley final
4 August 2013	18:00	Women's 50 m freestyle final
4 August 2013	18:00	Men's 1500 m freestyle final
4 August 2013	18:00	Women's 400 m individual medley final
4 August 2013	18:00	Men's 4 × 100 m medley final
4 August 2013	18:00	Women's 4 × 100 m medley final

== Recap ==
During the World Aquatic Championships, five world records were set (one twice), all by women. Katie Ledecky of the United States broke the world record in the 800-metre freestyle and the 1500-metre freestyle events en route to two gold medals. She also won the 400-metre freestyle to go 3-for-3 in her events. She added a fourth gold, swimming a leg of the 4 × 200-metre freestyle relay that the United States won. Her performance earned her "female swimmer of the meet," beating out fellow American Missy Franklin based on a formula that does not consider relay events. Franklin became the first woman ever to win six golds in a single World Championships. Kristin Otto of East Germany has achieved this at the 1988 Olympic Games. She won the 100-metre and 200-metre backstroke events and the 200-metre freestyle. She finished fourth in the 100-metre freestyle in personal best-time. She was also a part of all three women's relay events, which the United States swept. The previous record of five golds in a single World Championships was held by America's Tracy Caulkins and Australia's Libby Trickett. Among men, Michael Phelps and Mark Spitz of America, Ian Thorpe of Australia all won at least six golds in a single World Championships or Olympics. Franklin also moved into a tie with Trickett for most all-time gold medals with nine.

Rūta Meilutytė of Lithuania broke both the 50-metre and 100-metre breaststroke records in the semi-final of each event. Denmark's Rikke Møller Pedersen set the 200-metre breatstroke record in that event's semi-finals. However, it was Russia's Yuliya Yefimova who won the gold medal in both the 50-metre and 200-metre events, while Meilutytė took gold in the 100-metre.

On the men's side, Sun Yang claimed three golds by winning the 400-metre, 800-metre, and 1500-metre freestyle events to earn "male swimmer of the meet." He also swam China to bronze in the 4 × 200-metre freestyle relay despite starting his anchor leg two seconds behind third place. Ryan Lochte from the United States won two gold to bring his overall World Champions haul to 15. In the 4 × 100-metre medley relay, the United States appeared to finish first by a wide margin but was disqualified because a swimmer left the platform too early. As a result, France moved up to first. Camille Lacourt won France's first ever 50-metre backstroke title. César Cielo became the first three-time World Champion of the 50-metre free, winning a final that featured three Olympic gold medalists.

== Medal summary ==
The United States won the overall medal count with 29 medals (24% of total available) and 13 golds (32%). China won the second most golds (5), but just 9 medals overall (down from 14 in the last World Championships). Australia won 13 medals (3 gold) for second place on the total medal count. Russia won 8 medals, the most for the nation since 1998. Germany, Great Britain, and Italy, all historically strong swimming nations, won just four medals among them.

=== Medal table ===
* Host nation

* Host nation (Spain)

Rank	Nation	Gold	Silver	Bronze	Total
1	United States	13	8	8	29
2	China	5	2	2	9
3	France	4	1	4	9
4	Australia	3	10	0	13
5	Hungary	3	1	1	5
5	South Africa	3	1	1	5
7	Russia	2	3	3	8
8	Brazil	2	0	3	5
9	Denmark	1	3	0	4
10	Japan	1	2	3	6
11	Lithuania	1	1	0	2
11	Sweden	1	1	0	2
13	Netherlands	1	0	3	4
14	Spain*	0	3	1	4
15	Poland	0	2	1	3
16	Canada	0	1	2	3
17	Italy	0	1	1	2
18	Germany	0	1	0	1
19	New Zealand	0	0	3	3
20	Finland	0	0	1	1
20	Great Britain	0	0	1	1
20	Trinidad and Tobago	0	0	1	1
Totals (22 entries)		40	41	39	120

=== Men ===
Event	Gold		Silver		Bronze	
50 m freestyle	César Cielo; Brazil	21.32	Vladimir Morozov; Russia	21.47; NR	George Bovell; Trinidad and Tobago	21.51
100 m freestyle	James Magnussen; Australia	47.71	Jimmy Feigen; United States	47.82	Nathan Adrian; United States	47.84
200 m freestyle	Yannick Agnel; France	1:44.20	Conor Dwyer; United States	1:45.32	Danila Izotov; Russia	1:45.59
400 m freestyle	Sun Yang; China	3:41.59	Kosuke Hagino; Japan	3:44.82; NR	Connor Jaeger; United States	3:44.85
800 m freestyle	Sun Yang; China	7:41.36	Michael McBroom; United States	7:43.60; NR	Ryan Cochrane; Canada	7:43.70
1500 m freestyle	Sun Yang; China	14:41.15	Ryan Cochrane; Canada	14:42.48	Gregorio Paltrinieri; Italy	14:45.37; NR
50 m backstroke	Camille Lacourt; France	24.42	Matt Grevers; United States; Jérémy Stravius; France	24.54	Not awarded	
100 m backstroke	Matt Grevers; United States	52.93	David Plummer; United States	53.12	Jérémy Stravius; France	53.21
200 m backstroke	Ryan Lochte; United States	1:53.79	Radosław Kawęcki; Poland	1:54.24; ER	Tyler Clary; United States	1:54.64
50 m breaststroke	Cameron van der Burgh; South Africa	26.77	Christian Sprenger; Australia	26.78; OC	Giulio Zorzi; South Africa	27.04
100 m breaststroke	Christian Sprenger; Australia	58.79	Cameron van der Burgh; South Africa	58.97	Felipe Lima; Brazil	59.65
200 m breaststroke	Dániel Gyurta; Hungary	2:07.23; CR, ER	Marco Koch; Germany	2:08.54	Matti Mattsson; Finland	2:08.95; NR
50 m butterfly	César Cielo; Brazil	23.01	Eugene Godsoe; United States	23.05	Frédérick Bousquet; France	23.11
100 m butterfly	Chad le Clos; South Africa	51.06; NR	László Cseh; Hungary	51.45; NR	Konrad Czerniak; Poland	51.46
200 m butterfly	Chad le Clos; South Africa	1:54.32	Paweł Korzeniowski; Poland	1:55.01	Wu Peng; China	1:55.09
200 m individual medley	Ryan Lochte; United States	1:54.98	Kosuke Hagino; Japan	1:56.29	Thiago Pereira; Brazil	1:56.30
400 m individual medley	Daiya Seto; Japan	4:08.69	Chase Kalisz; United States	4:09.22	Thiago Pereira; Brazil	4:09.48
4 × 100 m freestyle relay	France; Yannick Agnel (48.76); Florent Manaudou (47.93); Fabien Gilot (46.90); Jérémy Stravius (47.59)	3:11.18	United States; Nathan Adrian (47.95); Ryan Lochte (47.80); Anthony Ervin (47.44); Jimmy Feigen (48.23)	3:11.42	Russia; Andrey Grechin (48.09); Nikita Lobintsev (47.91); Vladimir Morozov (47.40); Danila Izotov (48.04)	3:11.44
4 × 200 m freestyle relay	United States; Conor Dwyer (1:45.76); Ryan Lochte (1:44.98); Charlie Houchin (1:45.59); Ricky Berens (1:45.39)	7:01.72	Russia; Danila Izotov (1:45.14); Nikita Lobintsev (1:46.23); Artem Lobuzov (1:46.16); Alexander Sukhorukov (1:46.39)	7:03.92	China; Wang Shun (1:47.41); Hao Yun (1:47.25); Li Yunqi (1:46.92); Sun Yang (1:43.16)	7:04.74; NR
4 × 100 m medley relay	France; Camille Lacourt (53.23); Giacomo Perez d'Ortona (59.26); Jérémy Stravius (51.33); Fabien Gilot (47.39)	3:31.51	Australia; Ashley Delaney (53.55); Christian Sprenger (58.47); Tommaso D'Orsogna (52.34); James Magnussen (47.28)	3:31.64	Japan; Ryosuke Irie (53.48); Kosuke Kitajima (59.29); Takuro Fujii (51.67); Shinri Shioura (47.82)	3:32.26
AF African record | AM Americas record | AS Asian record | CR Championship record | ER European record | OC Oceania record | WR World record | NR National record

=== Women ===
Event	Gold		Silver		Bronze	
50 m freestyle	Ranomi Kromowidjojo; Netherlands	24.05	Cate Campbell; Australia	24.14	Francesca Halsall; Great Britain	24.30
100 m freestyle	Cate Campbell; Australia	52.34	Sarah Sjöström; Sweden	52.89	Ranomi Kromowidjojo; Netherlands	53.42
200 m freestyle	Missy Franklin; United States	1:54.81	Federica Pellegrini; Italy	1:55.14	Camille Muffat; France	1:55.72
400 m freestyle	Katie Ledecky; United States	3:59.82; AM	Melanie Costa; Spain	4:02.47; NR	Lauren Boyle; New Zealand	4:03.89
800 m freestyle	Katie Ledecky; United States	8:13.86; WR	Lotte Friis; Denmark	8:16.32	Lauren Boyle; New Zealand	8:18.58; OC
1500 m freestyle	Katie Ledecky; United States	15:36.53; WR	Lotte Friis; Denmark	15:38.88; ER	Lauren Boyle; New Zealand	15:44.71; OC
50 m backstroke	Zhao Jing; China	27.29	Fu Yuanhui; China	27.39	Aya Terakawa; Japan	27.53; NR
100 m backstroke	Missy Franklin; United States	58.42	Emily Seebohm; Australia	59.06	Aya Terakawa; Japan	59.23
200 m backstroke	Missy Franklin; United States	2:04.76; CR	Belinda Hocking; Australia	2:06.66	Hilary Caldwell; Canada	2:06.80; NR
50 m breaststroke	Yuliya Yefimova; Russia	29.52; NR	Rūta Meilutytė; Lithuania	29.59	Jessica Hardy; United States	29.80 =AM
100 m breaststroke	Rūta Meilutytė; Lithuania	1:04.42	Yuliya Yefimova; Russia	1:05.02; NR	Jessica Hardy; United States	1:05.52
200 m breaststroke	Yuliya Yefimova; Russia	2:19.41; NR	Rikke Møller Pedersen; Denmark	2:20.08	Micah Lawrence; United States	2:22.37
50 m butterfly	Jeanette Ottesen; Denmark	25.24; NR	Lu Ying; China	25.42; AS	Ranomi Kromowidjojo; Netherlands	25.53
100 m butterfly	Sarah Sjöström; Sweden	56.53	Alicia Coutts; Australia	56.97	Dana Vollmer; United States	57.24
200 m butterfly	Liu Zige; China	2:04.59	Mireia Belmonte; Spain	2:04.78; NR	Katinka Hosszú; Hungary	2:05.59
200 m individual medley	Katinka Hosszú; Hungary	2:07.92	Alicia Coutts; Australia	2:09.39	Mireia Belmonte; Spain	2:09.45; NR
400 m individual medley	Katinka Hosszú; Hungary	4:30.41	Mireia Belmonte; Spain	4:31.21; NR	Elizabeth Beisel; United States	4:31.69
4 × 100 m freestyle relay	United States; Missy Franklin (53.51); Natalie Coughlin (52.98); Shannon Vreeland (53.22); Megan Romano (52.60)	3:32.31; AM	Australia; Cate Campbell (52.33) OC; Bronte Campbell (53.47); Emma McKeon (53.19); Alicia Coutts (53.44)	3:32.43; OC	Netherlands; Elise Bouwens (55.68); Femke Heemskerk (52.86); Inge Dekker (54.58); Ranomi Kromowidjojo (52.65)	3:35.77
4 × 200 m freestyle relay	United States; Katie Ledecky (1:56.32); Shannon Vreeland (1:56.97); Karlee Bispo (1:57.58); Missy Franklin (1:54.27)	7:45.14	Australia; Bronte Barratt (1:57.04); Kylie Palmer (1:56.29); Brittany Elmslie (1:56.42); Alicia Coutts (1:57.33)	7:47.08	France; Camille Muffat (1:56.45); Charlotte Bonnet (1:56.81); Mylène Lazare (1:59.15); Coralie Balmy (1:56.02)	7:48.43
4 × 100 m medley relay	United States; Missy Franklin (58.39); Jessica Hardy (1:05.10); Dana Vollmer (56.31); Megan Romano (53.43)	3:53.23	Australia; Emily Seebohm (59.40); Sally Foster (1:06.84); Alicia Coutts (56.89); Cate Campbell (52.09)	3:55.22	Russia; Dariya Ustinova (1:00.58); Yuliya Yefimova (1:04.82); Svetlana Chimrova (57.64); Veronika Popova (53.43)	3:56.47
AF African record | AM Americas record | AS Asian record | CR Championship record | ER European record | OC Oceania record | WR World record | NR National record

== Records ==
The following world and championship records were set during the competition:

=== World records ===
Date	Round	Event	Time	Name	Nation
29 July	Semifinal 2	Women's 100 m breaststroke	1:04.35	Rūta Meilutytė	Lithuania
30 July	Final	Women's 1500 m freestyle	15:36.53	Katie Ledecky	United States
1 August	Semifinal 1	Women's 200 m breaststroke	2:19.11	Rikke Møller Pedersen	Denmark
3 August	Heat 8	Women's 50 m breaststroke	29.78	Yuliya Yefimova	Russia
3 August	Semifinal 2	Women's 50 m breaststroke	29.48	Rūta Meilutytė	Lithuania
3 August	Final	Women's 800 m freestyle	8:13.86	Katie Ledecky	United States

=== Championship records ===
Date	Round	Event	Established for	Time	Name	Nation
29 July	Heat 7	Women's 100 m breaststroke	(same)	1:04.52	Rūta Meilutytė	Lithuania
29 July	Semifinal 2	Women's 100 m breaststroke	Women's 50 m breaststroke	29.97	Rūta Meilutytė	Lithuania
2 August	Final	Men's 200 m breaststroke	(same)	2:07.23	Dániel Gyurta	Hungary
3 August	Final	Women's 200 m backstroke	(same)	2:04.76	Missy Franklin	United States
