= Brazil at the 2013 World Aquatics Championships =

- Flag of Brazil
- World Aquatics code: BRA
- National federation: Confederação Brasileira de Desportos Aquáticos
- Website: www.cbda.org.br

in Barcelona, Spain
- Competitors: 52 in 5 sports
- Medals Ranked 8th: Gold 3 Silver 2 Bronze 5 Total 10

World Aquatics Championships appearances (overview)
- 1973; 1975; 1978; 1982; 1986; 1991; 1994; 1998; 2001; 2003; 2005; 2007; 2009; 2011; 2013; 2015; 2017; 2019; 2022; 2023; 2024; 2025

Brazil competed at the 2013 World Aquatics Championships in Barcelona, Spain between July 20 and August 4, 2013.

== Medalists ==
Medal	Name	Sport	Event	Date
Gold	Poliana Okimoto	Open water swimming	Women's 10 km	23 July
Gold	César Cielo	Swimming	Men's 50 m butterfly	29 July
Gold	César Cielo	Swimming	Men's 50 m freestyle	3 August
Silver	Poliana Okimoto	Open water swimming	Women's 5 km	20 July
Silver	Ana Marcela Cunha	Open water swimming	Women's 10 km	23 July
Bronze	Ana Marcela Cunha	Open water swimming	Women's 5 km	20 July
Bronze	Allan do Carmo; Samuel de Bona; Poliana Okimoto	Open water swimming	Mixed team	25 July
Bronze	Felipe Lima	Swimming	Men's 100 m breaststroke	29 July
Bronze	Thiago Pereira	Swimming	Men's 200 m individual medley	1 August
Bronze	Thiago Pereira	Swimming	Men's 400 m individual medley	4 August

== Diving ==
César Castro is the only athlete to compete.

Men

Athlete	Event	Preliminaries		Semifinals		Final	
Athlete	Event	Points	Rank	Points	Rank	Points	Rank
César Castro	1 m springboard	292.85	30	—N/a		did not advance	
César Castro	3 m springboard	402.60	15 Q	409.65	15	did not advance	

== Open water swimming ==
Brazil qualified six athletes (4 men and 2 women) to compete.

Men

Athlete	Event	Time	Rank
Luiz Arapiraca	5 km	53:59.7	30
Samuel de Bona	5 km	53:34.9	6
Allan do Carmo	10 km	1:49:26.2	7
Allan do Carmo	25 km	4:47:30.1	5
Diogo Villarinho	10 km	1:53:20.3	52
Diogo Villarinho	25 km	4:50:31.3	15

Women

Athlete	Event	Time	Rank
Ana Marcela Cunha	5 km	56:44.4	3rd place, bronze medalist(s)
Ana Marcela Cunha	10 km	1:58:19.5	2nd place, silver medalist(s)
Ana Marcela Cunha	25 km	5:07:23.4	5
Poliana Okimoto	5 km	56:34.4	2nd place, silver medalist(s)
Poliana Okimoto	10 km	1:58:19.2	1st place, gold medalist(s)

Mixed

Athlete	Event	Time	Rank
Allan do Carmo; Samuel de Bona; Poliana Okimoto	Team	54:03.5	3rd place, bronze medalist(s)

== Swimming ==
Brazilian swimmers earned qualifying standards in the following events (up to a maximum of 2 swimmers in each event at the A-standard entry time, and 1 at the B-standard): A total of 23 swimmers (13 men and 10 women) are selected to compete at the World Championships, including world record holder and undisputed superstar César Cielo and Olympic silver medalist Thiago Pereira.

Men

Athlete	Event	Heat		Semifinal		Final	
Athlete	Event	Time	Rank	Time	Rank	Time	Rank
César Cielo	50 m freestyle	21.76	2 Q	21.60	=3 Q	21.32	1st place, gold medalist(s)
César Cielo	50 m butterfly	23.32	8 Q	22.86	2 Q	23.01	1st place, gold medalist(s)
Marcelo Chierighini	50 m freestyle	22.01	=8 Q	21.84	10	did not advance	
Marcelo Chierighini	100 m freestyle	49.08	15 Q	48.11	3 Q	48.28	6
Fernando Santos	100 m freestyle	49.71	25	did not advance			
Nicolas Oliveira	200 m freestyle	1:46.99	2 Q	1:47.42	11	did not advance	
Daniel Orzechowski	50 m backstroke	24.67	1 Q	24.79	=4 Q	24.87	6
Daniel Orzechowski	100 m backstroke	55.09	21	did not advance			
João Luiz Gomes Júnior	50 m breaststroke	27.39	8 Q	27.05	3 Q	27.20	5
João Luiz Gomes Júnior	100 m breaststroke	1:00.24	=12 Q	1:00.40	14	did not advance	
Felipe Lima	50 m breaststroke	27.11	2 Q	27.48	9	did not advance	
Felipe Lima	100 m breaststroke	1:00.06	8 Q	59.84	=5 Q	59.65	3rd place, bronze medalist(s)
Nicholas Santos	50 m butterfly	23.45	12 Q	22.81	1 Q	23.21	4
Leonardo de Deus	200 m backstroke	1:59.17	15 Q	1:57.92	12	did not advance	
Leonardo de Deus	200 m butterfly	1:56.52	6 Q	1:56.06	7 Q	1:56.44	8
Thiago Pereira	100 m butterfly	52.23	12 Q	52.43	15	did not advance	
Thiago Pereira	200 m individual medley	1:58.54	6 Q	1:57.52	4 Q	1:56.30	3rd place, bronze medalist(s)
Thiago Pereira	400 m individual medley	4:15.81	8 Q	—N/a		4:09.48	3rd place, bronze medalist(s)
Henrique Rodrigues	200 m individual medley	1:58.73	7 Q	1:59.47	12	did not advance	
Marcelo Chierighini; Nicolas Oliveira; Fernando Santos; Vinícius Waked	4×100 m freestyle relay	3:14.41	6 Q	—N/a		3:14.45	7
João de Lucca; Nicolas Oliveira; Fernando Santos; Vinícius Waked	4×200 m freestyle relay	7:15.97	11	—N/a		did not advance	
Marcelo Chierighini; Leonardo de Deus; Felipe Lima; Nicholas Santos	4×100 m medley relay	3:36.31	12	—N/a		did not advance	

Women

Athlete	Event	Heat		Semifinal		Final	
Athlete	Event	Time	Rank	Time	Rank	Time	Rank
Graciele Herrmann	50 m freestyle	25.32	18	did not advance			
Alessandra Marchioro	50 m freestyle	25.68	24	did not advance			
Alessandra Marchioro	100 m freestyle	56.16	=32	did not advance			
Manuella Lyrio	200 m freestyle	1:59.52 SA	22	did not advance			
Carolina Bilich	400 m freestyle	4:21.40	29	—N/a		did not advance	
Carolina Bilich	800 m freestyle	8:52.10	26	—N/a		did not advance	
Etiene Medeiros	50 m backstroke	28.16	5 Q	27.89	5 Q	27.83	4
Etiene Medeiros	100 m backstroke	1:01.75	21	did not advance			
Beatriz Travalon	50 m breaststroke	31.59	20	did not advance			
Beatriz Travalon	100 m breaststroke	1:11.39	38	did not advance			
Daynara de Paula	50 m butterfly	26.68	20	did not advance			
Daynara de Paula	100 m butterfly	59.16	15 Q	59.04	15	did not advance	
Joanna Melo	200 m backstroke	DNS		did not advance			
Joanna Melo	200 m butterfly	2:11.14	16 Q	2:14.07	16	did not advance	
Joanna Melo	200 m individual medley	2:15.00	25	did not advance			
Joanna Melo	400 m individual medley	4:44.55	17	—N/a		did not advance	
Daynara de Paula; Graciele Herrmann; Alessandra Marchioro; Larissa Oliveira	4×100 m freestyle relay	3:41.05 SA	11	—N/a		did not advance	
Jéssica Cavalheiro; Manuella Lyrio; Larissa Oliveira; Carolina Bilich	4×200 m freestyle relay	8:09.47	10	—N/a		did not advance	
Daynara de Paula; Etiene Medeiros; Larissa Oliveira; Beatriz Travalon	4×100 m medley relay	4:06.91	12	—N/a		did not advance	

== Synchronized swimming ==
Brazil nominated 10 athletes to compete.

Athlete	Event	Preliminaries		Final	
Athlete	Event	Points	Rank	Points	Rank
Lorena Molinos; Giovana Stephan	Duet free routine	81.830	15	did not advance	
Lorena Molinos; Giovana Stephan	Duet technical routine	83.300	13 Q	82.500	13
Luisa Borges; Maria Bruno; Gabriella Figueiredo; Jéssica Gonçalves; Maria Eduarda Miccuci; Lorena Molinos; Pamela Nogueira; Giovana Stephan; Daniella Figueiredo*; Beatriz Teixeira*	Team free routine	83.240	10 Q	83.520	10
Luisa Borges; Maria Bruno; Jéssica Gonçalves; Maria Eduarda Miccuci; Lorena Molinos; Pamela Nogueira; Giovana Stephan; Beatriz Teixeira; Daniella Figueiredo*; Gabriella Figueiredo*	Team technical routine	84.600	9 Q	84.000	10

* Reserves

== Water polo ==
Brazil qualified a women's team.

=== Women's tournament ===
Team roster

- Manuela Canetti
- Diana Abla
- Marina Zablith
- Marina Canetti
- Luciane Maia
- Adhara Santoro
- Melani Dias
- Izabela Chiappini
- Victoria Muratore
- Flávia Vigna
- Mirella Coutinho
- Viviane Bahia
- Victoria Chamorro

Group play

	Pld	W	D	L	GF	GA	GD	Pts
Hungary	3	3	0	0	48	17	+31	6
Italy	3	2	0	1	26	22	+4	4
Kazakhstan	3	1	0	2	23	32	−9	2
Brazil	3	0	0	3	16	42	−26	0

21 July 2013; 18:50	Report	Hungary	20–6	Brazil	Piscines Bernat Picornell, Barcelona; Attendance: 300; Referees: Naumov (RUS), Reemnet (NED)
21 July 2013; 18:50	Report	Score by quarters: 6–2, 3–0, 3–0, 8–4			Piscines Bernat Picornell, Barcelona; Attendance: 300; Referees: Naumov (RUS), Reemnet (NED)
21 July 2013; 18:50	Report	Keszthelyi 5	Goals	Zablith, Chiappini 2	Piscines Bernat Picornell, Barcelona; Attendance: 300; Referees: Naumov (RUS), Reemnet (NED)

23 July 2013; 17:30	Report	Kazakhstan	9–5	Brazil	Piscines Bernat Picornell, Barcelona; Attendance: 410; Referees: Taylan (TUR), Golijanin (SRB)
23 July 2013; 17:30	Report	Score by quarters: 2–2, 3–0, 2–0, 2–3			Piscines Bernat Picornell, Barcelona; Attendance: 410; Referees: Taylan (TUR), Golijanin (SRB)
23 July 2013; 17:30	Report	Jakayeva, Gritsenko 2	Goals	Chiappini 3	Piscines Bernat Picornell, Barcelona; Attendance: 410; Referees: Taylan (TUR), Golijanin (SRB)

25 July 2013; 13:30	Report	Italy	13–5	Brazil	Piscines Bernat Picornell, Barcelona; Attendance: 200; Referees: Skovpina (UZB), Koganov (AZE)
25 July 2013; 13:30	Report	Score by quarters: 2–1, 6–0, 2–1, 3–3			Piscines Bernat Picornell, Barcelona; Attendance: 200; Referees: Skovpina (UZB), Koganov (AZE)
25 July 2013; 13:30	Report	three players 3	Goals	Zablith 2	Piscines Bernat Picornell, Barcelona; Attendance: 200; Referees: Skovpina (UZB), Koganov (AZE)

Round of 16

27 July 2013; 17:30	Report	United States	14–3	Brazil	Piscines Bernat Picornell, Barcelona; Attendance: 400; Referees: Makita (JPN), Skovpina (UZB)
27 July 2013; 17:30	Report	Score by quarters: 3–0, 7–1, 2–2, 2–0			Piscines Bernat Picornell, Barcelona; Attendance: 400; Referees: Makita (JPN), Skovpina (UZB)
27 July 2013; 17:30	Report	five players 2	Goals	three players 1	Piscines Bernat Picornell, Barcelona; Attendance: 400; Referees: Makita (JPN), Skovpina (UZB)
