= Open water swimming at the 2013 World Aquatics Championships – Women's 10 km =

Women's 10 km at the Open water swimming at the 2013 World Aquatics Championships
- Dates: 23 July
- Competitors: 53 from 32 nations
- Winning time: 1:58:19.2

Medalists
gold medal	Poliana Okimoto	Brazil
silver medal	Ana Marcela Cunha	Brazil
bronze medal	Angela Maurer	Germany

The women's 10 km competition of the open water swimming events at the 2013 World Aquatics Championships was held on July 23.

== Results ==
The race was started at 12:00.

Rank	Swimmer	Nationality	Time
1st place, gold medalist(s)	Poliana Okimoto	Brazil	1:58:19.2
2nd place, silver medalist(s)	Ana Marcela Cunha	Brazil	1:58:19.5
3rd place, bronze medalist(s)	Angela Maurer	Germany	1:58:20.2
4	Kalliopi Araouzou	Greece	1:58:21.3
5	Anna Olasz	Hungary	1:58:22.4
6	Ophélie Aspord	France	1:58:23.2
7	Fang Yanqiao	China	1:58:23.2
8	Rebecca Mann	United States	1:58:23.4
9	Éva Risztov	Hungary	1:58:23.4
10	Christine Jennings	United States	1:58:23.6
11	Elizaveta Gorshkova	Russia	1:58:24.3
12	Martina Grimaldi	Italy	1:58:24.9
13	Yumi Kida	Japan	1:58:25.8
14	Keri-anne Payne	Great Britain	1:58:25.8
15	Svenja Zihsler	Germany	1:58:25.8
16	Yurema Requena	Spain	1:58:26.4
17	Erika Villaécija	Spain	1:58:27.8
18	Olga Beresnyeva	Ukraine	1:58:27.9
19	Zsofia Balazs	Canada	1:58:28.5
20	Melissa Gorman	Australia	1:58:30.9
21	Marianna Lymperta	Greece	1:58:33.0
22	Lizeth Rueda	Mexico	1:58:36.6
23	Cara Baker	New Zealand	1:58:38.5
24	Vicenia Navarro	Venezuela	1:58:38.5
25	Celia Barrot	France	1:58:41.8
26	Shi Yu	China	1:58:43.8
27	Florencia Mazzei	Argentina	1:58:43.9
28	Silvie Rybářová	Czech Republic	1:58:55.3
29	Heidi Gan	Malaysia	1:59:01.4
30	Chelsea Gubecka	Australia	1:59:16.3
31	Rachele Bruni	Italy	2:00:03.2
32	Paola Pérez	Venezuela	2:00:36.8
33	Danielle Huskisson	Great Britain	2:01:31.5
34	Emma Robinson	New Zealand	2:01:47.6
35	Nadine Williams	Canada	2:01:50.4
36	Julia Lucila Arino	Argentina	2:02:37.8
37	Barbora Picková	Czech Republic	2:04:02.8
38	Nataly Caldas	Ecuador	2:04:28.8
39	Alexandra Sokolova	Russia	2:04:45.3
39	Valerie Gruest	Guatemala	2:04:45.3
41	Angelica Andre	Portugal	2:04:45.4
41	Laila El Basiouny	Egypt	2:04:45.4
43	Melissa Villaseñor Reyes	Mexico	2:05:21.1
44	Xeniya Romanchuk	Kazakhstan	2:05:21.1
45	Mahina Valdivia	Chile	2:13:54.9
46	Clarice Le Roux	South Africa	2:15:35.7
47	Fiona On Yi Chan	Hong Kong	2:17:39.6
48	Mariya Ivanova	Kazakhstan	2:19:02.6
49	Li Hannah Hang Fung	Hong Kong	2:25:44.5
	Risa Andriani Permana	Indonesia	OTL
	Poorva Kiran Shetye	India	OTL
	Michelle Weber	South Africa	DNS
	Karla Šitić	Croatia	DNS
