= Open water swimming at the 2013 World Aquatics Championships – Men's 25 km =

Men's 25 km at the Open water swimming at the 2013 World Aquatics Championships
- Dates: 27 July
- Competitors: 35 from 24 nations
- Winning time: 4:47:27.0

Medalists
| gold medal | Thomas Lurz | Germany |
| silver medal | Brian Ryckeman | Belgium |
| bronze medal | Evgeny Drattsev | Russia |

The men's 25 km competition of the open water swimming events at the 2013 World Aquatics Championships was held on July 27.

== Results ==
The race was started at 08:00.

| Rank | Swimmer | Nationality | Time |
|---|---|---|---|
| 1st place, gold medalist(s) | Thomas Lurz | Germany | 4:47:27.0 |
| 2nd place, silver medalist(s) | Brian Ryckeman | Belgium | 4:47:27.4 |
| 3rd place, bronze medalist(s) | Evgeny Drattsev | Russia | 4:47:28.1 |
| 4 | Alex Meyer | United States | 4:47:28.2 |
| 5 | Allan do Carmo | Brazil | 4:47:30.1 |
| 6 | Spyridon Gianniotis | Greece | 4:47:31.3 |
| 7 | Simone Ruffini | Italy | 4:47:42.7 |
| 8 | Guillermo Bertola | Argentina | 4:47:44.8 |
| 9 | Philippe Guertin | Canada | 4:48:46.8 |
| 10 | Jan Pošmourný | Czech Republic | 4:48:53.4 |
| 11 | Shahar Resman | Israel | 4:48:53.5 |
| 12 | Bertrand Venturi | France | 4:48:58.3 |
| 13 | Gergely Gyurta | Hungary | 4:49:03.9 |
| 14 | Jordan Wilimovsky | United States | 4:49:11.1 |
| 15 | Diogo Villarinho | Brazil | 4:50:31.3 |
| 16 | Luis Bolanos | Venezuela | 4:50:52.7 |
| 17 | Antonios Fokaidis | Greece | 4:50:55.1 |
| 18 | Phillip Ryan | New Zealand | 4:50:57.2 |
| 19 | Rhys Mainstone-Hodson | Australia | 4:51:08.2 |
| 20 | Axel Reymond | France | 4:53:47.2 |
| 21 | Valerio Cleri | Italy | 4:55:16.5 |
| 22 | Libor Smolka | Czech Republic | 4:58:13.7 |
| 23 | Vladimir Dyatchin | Russia | 4:58:18.0 |
| 24 | Vitaliy Khudyakov | Kazakhstan | 4:58:18.1 |
| 25 | Martín Carrizo | Argentina | 5:01:43.1 |
| 26 | Richard Weinberger | Canada | 5:02:32.6 |
| 27 | Arseniy Lavrentyev | Portugal | 5:03:12.8 |
| 28 | Troyden Prinsloo | South Africa | 5:03:19.8 |
| 29 | Weng Jingwei | China | 5:04:02.5 |
| 30 | Saleh Mohammad | Syria | 5:04:03.6 |
| 31 | Badr Chebchoub | Tunisia | 5:33:07.2 |
| 32 | Abdelrahman Esam | Egypt | 5:33:35.7 |
| | Christian Reichert | Germany | DNF |
| | Han Lidu | China | DNF |
| | Ihor Chervynskyi | Ukraine | DNF |
