= Open water swimming at the 2013 World Aquatics Championships – Women's 25 km =

Women's 25 km at the Open water swimming at the 2013 World Aquatics Championships
- Dates: 28 July
- Competitors: 22 from 16 nations
- Winning time: 5:07:19.7

Medalists
gold medal	Martina Grimaldi	Italy
silver medal	Angela Maurer	Germany
bronze medal	Eva Fabian	United States

The women's 25 km competition of the open water swimming events at the 2013 World Aquatics Championships was held on July 28.

== Results ==
The race was started at 08:00.

Rank	Swimmer	Nationality	Time
1st place, gold medalist(s)	Martina Grimaldi	Italy	5:07:19.7
2nd place, silver medalist(s)	Angela Maurer	Germany	5:07:19.8
3rd place, bronze medalist(s)	Eva Fabian	United States	5:07:20.4
4	Alice Franco	Italy	5:07:22.9
5	Ana Marcela Cunha	Brazil	5:07:23.4
6	Christine Jennings	United States	5:07:32.3
7	Margarita Dominguez Cabezas	Spain	5:11:55.5
8	Yumi Kida	Japan	5:16:25.7
9	Lei Shan	China	5:16:34.3
10	Alexandra Sokolova	Russia	5:18:14.3
11	Yang Dandan	China	5:19:13.7
12	Celia Barrot	France	5:20:31.8
13	Paola Pérez	Venezuela	5:22:40.1
14	Silvie Rybářová	Czech Republic	5:22:42.4
15	Julia Lucila Arino	Argentina	5:22:47.0
16	Vicenia Navarro	Venezuela	5:23:31.8
17	Nadine Williams	Canada	5:42:17.9
18	Xeniya Romanchuk	Kazakhstan	5:43:40.5
	Wasella Hussien	Egypt	OTL
	Svenja Zihsler	Germany	DNF
	Olga Beresnyeva	Ukraine	DNF
	Barbora Picková	Czech Republic	DNF
