= Open water swimming at the 2013 World Aquatics Championships – Women's 5 km =

Women's 5 km at the Open water swimming at the 2013 World Aquatics Championships
- Dates: 20 July
- Competitors: 45 from 28 nations
- Winning time: 56:34.2

Medalists
gold medal	Haley Anderson	United States
silver medal	Poliana Okimoto	Brazil
bronze medal	Ana Marcela Cunha	Brazil

The women's 5 km competition of the open water swimming events at the 2013 World Aquatics Championships was held on July 20.

== Results ==
The final was started at 10:00.

Rank	Swimmer	Nationality	Time
1st place, gold medalist(s)	Haley Anderson	United States	56:34.2
2nd place, silver medalist(s)	Poliana Okimoto	Brazil	56:34.4
3rd place, bronze medalist(s)	Ana Marcela Cunha	Brazil	56:44.7
4	Kalliopi Araouzou	Greece	56:45.3
5	Isabelle Härle	Germany	56:46.2
6	Cara Baker	New Zealand	56:46.2
7	Martina Grimaldi	Italy	56:46.3
8	Rebecca Mann	United States	56:46.4
9	Aurélie Muller	France	56:46.5
10	Rachele Bruni	Italy	56:48.1
11	Danielle DeFrancesco	Australia	56:48.2
12	Anna Olasz	Hungary	56:58.4
13	Yurema Requena	Spain	57:00.1
14	Bonnie MacDonald	Australia	57:01.3
15	Anastasiya Azarova	Russia	57:04.3
16	Margarita Domínguez	Spain	57:04.4
17	Elizaveta Gorshkova	Russia	57:06.2
18	Ophélie Aspord	France	57:06.3
19	Fang Yanqiao	China	57:07.0
20	Cao Shiyue	China	57:19.5
21	Angelica Andre	Portugal	57:22.1
22	Katia Barros	Ecuador	57:26.4
23	Swann Oberson	Switzerland	57:26.8
24	Emma Robinson	New Zealand	57:29.5
25	Kyna Pereira	South Africa	57:30.8
26	Florencia Mazzei	Argentina	57:49.0
27	Paola Pérez	Venezuela	57:51.5
28	Marianna Lymperta	Greece	57:55.3
29	Barbora Picková	Czech Republic	58:58.2
30	Maroua Mathlouthi	Tunisia	59:51.8
31	Florencia Melo	Venezuela	1:01:32.5
32	Nataly Caldas	Ecuador	1:01:41.7
33	Laila El-Basiouny	Egypt	1:01:52.4
34	Mayela Oropeza	Mexico	1:03:01.1
35	Wasela Hussein	Egypt	1:03:02.2
36	Valerie Gruest	Guatemala	1:03:03.8
37	Mariya Ivanova	Kazakhstan	1:05:19.0
38	Mahina Valdivia	Chile	1:05:19.6
39	Anna Gakhokidze	Kazakhstan	1:06:25.6
40	Li Hannah Hang Fung	Hong Kong	1:06:30.6
41	Risa Andriani Permana	Indonesia	1:10:16.7
42	Maria Aponte	Bolivia	1:10:21.2
	Michelle Weber	South Africa	DNF
	Fiona On Yi Chan	Hong Kong	DSQ
	Finnia Wunram	Germany	DSQ
