= Open water swimming at the 2013 World Aquatics Championships – Men's 10 km =

Men's 10 km at the Open water swimming at the 2013 World Aquatics Championships
- Dates: 22 July
- Competitors: 66 from 38 nations
- Winning time: 1:49:11.8

Medalists
gold medal	Spyridon Gianniotis	Greece
silver medal	Thomas Lurz	Germany
bronze medal	Oussama Mellouli	Tunisia

The men's 10 km competition of the open water swimming events at the 2013 World Aquatics Championships was held on July 22.

== Results ==
The race was started at 12:00.

Rank	Swimmer	Nationality	Time
1st place, gold medalist(s)	Spyridon Gianniotis	Greece	1:49:11.8
2nd place, silver medalist(s)	Thomas Lurz	Germany	1:49:14.5
3rd place, bronze medalist(s)	Oussama Mellouli	Tunisia	1:49:19.2
4	Damien Cattin-Vidal	France	1:49:19.8
5	Richard Weinberger	Canada	1:49:19.9
6	Ferry Weertman	Netherlands	1:49:20.3
7	Allan do Carmo	Brazil	1:49:26.2
8	Chad Ho	South Africa	1:49:26.3
9	Christian Reichert	Germany	1:49:26.8
10	Guillermo Bertola	Argentina	1:49:28.4
11	Brian Ryckeman	Belgium	1:49:29.3
12	Simon Huitenga	Australia	1:49:29.7
13	Rhys Mainstone-Hodson	Australia	1:49:30.4
14	Valerio Cleri	Italy	1:49:30.5
15	Jack Burnell	Great Britain	1:49:30.6
16	Christopher Bryan	Ireland	1:49:33.4
17	Sergey Bolshakov	Russia	1:49:34.5
18	Gergely Gyurta	Hungary	1:49:34.6
19	Ihor Chervynskyi	Ukraine	1:49:40.6
20	Kane Radford	New Zealand	1:49:43.0
21	Yasunari Hirai	Japan	1:49:52.8
22	Jan Pošmourný	Czech Republic	1:49:54.4
23	Eric Hedlin	Canada	1:49:54.5
24	Johndry Segovia	Venezuela	1:49:59.7
25	Ventsislav Aydarski	Bulgaria	1:50:00.2
26	Yuto Kobayashi	Japan	1:50:17.4
27	Miguel Rozas	Spain	1:50:18.0
28	Martin Carrizo	Argentina	1:50:18.4
29	Ihor Snitko	Ukraine	1:50:18.9
30	Santiago Enderica	Ecuador	1:50:20.2
31	Ivan Enderica	Ecuador	1:50:20.6
32	Antonios Fokaidis	Greece	1:50:20.7
33	Vasco Gaspar	Portugal	1:50:20.7
34	Kirill Abrosimov	Russia	1:50:22.5
35	Ivan Lopez	Mexico	1:50:22.8
36	Yuval Safra	Israel	1:50:23.5
37	Thomas Snelson	Spain	1:50:25.1
38	Daniel Fogg	Great Britain	1:50:29.0
39	Arseniy Lavrentyev	Portugal	1:50:31.7
40	Axel Reymond	France	1:50:33.0
41	Zhang Zibin	China	1:50:55.4
42	Alex Meyer	United States	1:51:01.8
43	Mario Sanzullo	Italy	1:51:07.7
44	Luis Bolanos	Venezuela	1:51:09.6
45	Phillip Ryan	New Zealand	1:51:11.3
46	Shahar Resman	Israel	1:51:13.6
47	Jan Kutnik	Czech Republic	1:51:15.1
48	Miguel Hernandez	Mexico	1:51:17.6
49	Vitaliy Khudyakov	Kazakhstan	1:51:42.8
50	Sean Ryan	United States	1:51:43.7
51	Troyden Prinsloo	South Africa	1:51:48.0
52	Diogo Villarinho	Brazil	1:53:20.3
53	Zagrani Mohamed Amine	Tunisia	2:03:03.3
54	Youssef Hossameldeen	Egypt	2:03:05.3
55	Francisco Montero	Costa Rica	2:03:27.6
56	Vladimir Tolikin	Kazakhstan	2:04:47.6
57	Vicente Vidal	Chile	2:05:14.7
58	Rodolfo Sánchez	Costa Rica	2:06:50.7
59	Poon Ching Leung Sunny	Hong Kong	2:06:55.8
60	Manuel Meneses	Guatemala	2:09:15.8
61	Li Chun Hong	Hong Kong	2:09:17.5
62	Abdul Hady	Indonesia	2:10:46.2
	Mandar Anandrao Divase	India	DNF
	Adel Ragab	Egypt	DNF
	Zu Lijun	China	DSQ
	Saleh Mohammad	Syria	DNS
