= Open water swimming at the 2013 World Aquatics Championships – Men's 5 km =

Men's 5 km at the Open water swimming at the 2013 World Aquatics Championships
- Dates: 20 July
- Competitors: 54 from 33 nations
- Winning time: 53:30.4

Medalists
gold medal	Oussama Mellouli	Tunisia
silver medal	Eric Hedlin	Canada
bronze medal	Thomas Lurz	Germany

The men's 5 km competition of the open water swimming events at the 2013 World Aquatics Championships was held on July 20.

== Results ==
The race was started at 13:00.

Rank	Swimmer	Nationality	Time
1st place, gold medalist(s)	Oussama Mellouli	Tunisia	53:30.4
2nd place, silver medalist(s)	Eric Hedlin	Canada	53:31.6
3rd place, bronze medalist(s)	Thomas Lurz	Germany	53:32.2
4	Chad Ho	South Africa	53.33.7
5	Jarrod Poort	Australia	53:34.3
6	Samuel de Bona	Brazil	53:34.9
7	Ivan Enderica Ochoa	Ecuador	53:36.7
8	Sergey Bolshakov	Russia	53:36.8
9	Damien Cattin-Vidal	France	53:38.4
10	Ihor Chervynskyi	Ukraine	53:38.4
11	Rob Muffels	Germany	53:38.5
12	Evgeny Drattsev	Russia	53:38.6
13	Andrew Gemmell	United States	53:38.7
14	Vasco Gaspar	Portugal	53:40.5
15	Miguel Rozas	Spain	53:40.6
16	Federico Vanelli	Italy	53:42.3
17	Yuval Safra	Israel	53:43.8
18	Kane Radford	New Zealand	53:44.3
19	Rhys Mainstone-Hodson	Australia	53:44.4
20	Ventsislav Aydarski	Bulgaria	53:45.6
21	Jan Pošmourný	Czech Republic	53:45.7
22	Sean Ryan	United States	53:45.9
23	Philippe Guertin	Canada	53:46.4
24	Luca Ferretti	Italy	53:47.1
25	Yuto Kobayashi	Japan	53:48.0
26	Thomas Snelson	Spain	53:49.3
27	Daniel Marais	South Africa	53:51.0
28	Márk Papp	Hungary	53:55.3
29	Enzo Vial-Collet	France	53:59.6
30	Luiz Arapiraca	Brazil	53:59.7
31	Xu Wenchao	China	54:01.0
32	Jan Kutnik	Czech Republic	54:01.2
33	Ihor Snitko	Ukraine	54:01.2
34	Johndry Segovia	Venezuela	54:02.3
35	Lang Yuanpeng	China	54:02.4
36	Adel Ragab	Egypt	54:20.4
37	Vitaliy Khudyakov	Kazakhstan	54:24.8
38	Phillip Ryan	New Zealand	56:17.5
39	Ahmed Gebrel	Palestine	57:04.0
40	Youssef Hossameldeen	Egypt	57:08.5
41	Seifeddine Sghaier	Tunisia	57:10.1
42	Francisco Montero	Costa Rica	57:19.4
43	Vladimir Tolikin	Kazakhstan	57:40.9
44	Rodolfo Sánchez	Costa Rica	59:48.1
45	Vicente Vidal	Chile	1:00:02.1
46	Ching Leung Sunny Poon	Hong Kong	1:00:05.9
47	Manuel Meneses	Guatemala	1:00:08.5
48	Walter Caballero	Bolivia	1:00:11.9
49	Li Chun Hong	Hong Kong	1:00:15.9
50	Abdul Hady	Indonesia	1:00:40.7
51	Hayden Vickers	Cook Islands	1:10:56.3
52	Amgad Mesad Elsaroor	Sudan	1:23:17.5
	Ahmed Adam Abdelrahman Adam	Sudan	OTL
	Fernando Sevilla	Mexico	DSQ
