= Swimming at the 2013 World Aquatics Championships – Men's 400 metre individual medley =

Men's 400 metre individual medley at the 2013 World Aquatics Championships
- Venue: Palau Sant Jordi
- Dates: August 4, 2013 (heats & final)
- Competitors: 39 from 34 nations
- Winning time: 4:08.69

Medalists
| gold medal | Daiya Seto | Japan |
| silver medal | Chase Kalisz | United States |
| bronze medal | Thiago Pereira | Brazil |

Barcelona Palau San Jordi

The men's 400 metre individual medley event in swimming at the 2013 World Aquatics Championships took place on 4 August at the Palau Sant Jordi in Barcelona, Spain.

== Records ==
Prior to this competition, the existing world and championship records were:

| World record | Michael Phelps (USA) | 4:03.84 | Beijing, China | 10 August 2008 |
| Competition record | Chase Kalisz (USA) | 4:05.90 | Budapest, Hungary | 30 July 2017 |

== Results ==
=== Heats ===
The heats were held at 10:00.

| Rank | Heat | Lane | Name | Nationality | Time | Notes |
|---|---|---|---|---|---|---|
| 1 | 3 | 5 | Chase Kalisz | United States | 4:11.87 | Q |
| 2 | 2 | 4 | Daiya Seto | Japan | 4:12.96 | Q |
| 3 | 4 | 6 | Tyler Clary | United States | 4:13.55 | Q |
| 4 | 4 | 4 | Kosuke Hagino | Japan | 4:13.80 | Q |
| 5 | 2 | 5 | Dávid Verrasztó | Hungary | 4:13.95 | Q |
| 6 | 2 | 6 | Daniel Wallace | Great Britain | 4:14.15 | Q |
| 7 | 3 | 4 | Thomas Fraser-Holmes | Australia | 4:14.52 | Q |
| 8 | 4 | 2 | Thiago Pereira | Brazil | 4:15.81 | Q |
| 9 | 2 | 3 | Roberto Pavoni | Great Britain | 4:15.90 | |
| 10 | 4 | 5 | Federico Turrini | Italy | 4:15.96 | |
| 11 | 4 | 3 | Yannick Lebherz | Germany | 4:16.23 | |
| 12 | 4 | 8 | Alexis Santos | Portugal | 4:16.30 | NR |
| 13 | 2 | 7 | Alec Page | Canada | 4:16.62 | |
| 14 | 3 | 3 | Luca Marin | Italy | 4:17.71 | |
| 15 | 3 | 6 | Gal Nevo | Israel | 4:17.95 | |
| 16 | 2 | 1 | Jakub Maly | Austria | 4:19.21 | |
| 17 | 3 | 1 | Michael Meyer | South Africa | 4:21.17 | |
| 18 | 3 | 8 | Simon Sjödin | Sweden | 4:21.74 | |
| 19 | 3 | 0 | Yury Suvorau | Belarus | 4:21.82 | NR |
| 20 | 3 | 2 | Maksym Shemberev | Ukraine | 4:22.65 | |
| 21 | 4 | 7 | Kevin Wedel | Germany | 4:23.18 | |
| 22 | 2 | 8 | Nathan Capp | New Zealand | 4:23.27 | |
| 23 | 4 | 9 | Pedro Pinotes | Angola | 4:23.36 | |
| 24 | 1 | 9 | Taki Mrabet | Tunisia | 4:23.39 | |
| 25 | 1 | 7 | Christoph Meier | Liechtenstein | 4:23.90 | NR |
| 26 | 2 | 0 | Anton Sveinn McKee | Iceland | 4:23.99 | NR |
| 27 | 4 | 1 | Ward Bauwens | Belgium | 4:25.07 | |
| 28 | 1 | 6 | Pavel Janeček | Czech Republic | 4:25.14 | |
| 29 | 3 | 7 | Shi Yi | China | 4:25.42 | |
| 30 | 1 | 5 | Alpkan Ornek | Turkey | 4:28.22 | |
| 31 | 1 | 4 | Nikola Dimitrov | Bulgaria | 4:28.73 | |
| 32 | 1 | 2 | Povilas Strazdas | Lithuania | 4:29.05 | |
| 33 | 1 | 3 | Bogdan Knežević | Serbia | 4:29.94 | |
| 34 | 1 | 1 | Nuttapong Ketin | Thailand | 4:30.67 | |
| 35 | 2 | 9 | Ezequiel Trujillo Aviles | Mexico | 4:30.73 | |
| 36 | 3 | 9 | Mohamed Gadallh | Egypt | 4:32.95 | |
| 37 | 4 | 0 | Im Tae-Jeong | South Korea | 4:34.69 | |
| 38 | 1 | 0 | Bartal Hofgaard Hestoy | Faroe Islands | 4:35.37 | NR |
| 39 | 1 | 8 | Ayman Klzie | Syria | 4:41.12 | |
| | 2 | 2 | Raphaël Stacchiotti | Luxembourg | | DNS |

=== Final ===
The final was held at 18:15.

| Rank | Lane | Name | Nationality | Time | Notes |
|---|---|---|---|---|---|
| 1st place, gold medalist(s) | 5 | Daiya Seto | Japan | 4:08.69 | |
| 2nd place, silver medalist(s) | 4 | Chase Kalisz | United States | 4:09.22 | |
| 3rd place, bronze medalist(s) | 8 | Thiago Pereira | Brazil | 4:09.48 | |
| 4 | 3 | Tyler Clary | United States | 4:10.39 | |
| 5 | 6 | Kosuke Hagino | Japan | 4:10.77 | |
| 6 | 2 | Dávid Verrasztó | Hungary | 4:13.68 | |
| 7 | 7 | Daniel Wallace | Great Britain | 4:13.72 | |
| 8 | 1 | Thomas Fraser-Holmes | Australia | 4:17.46 | |
