= Ecuador at the 2013 World Aquatics Championships =

- World Aquatics code: ECU

in Barcelona, Spain
- Competitors: 8 in 2 sports
- Medals: Gold 0 Silver 0 Bronze 0 Total 0

World Aquatics Championships appearances
- 1973; 1975; 1978; 1982; 1986; 1991; 1994; 1998; 2001; 2003; 2005; 2007; 2009; 2011; 2013; 2015; 2017; 2019; 2022; 2023; 2024; 2025

Ecuador is competing at the 2013 World Aquatics Championships in Barcelona, Spain between 19 July and 4 August 2013. Ecuador, suspended by FINA, participated under the FINA flag as independent athletes.

== Open water swimming ==
Ecuador qualified four quota places for the following events in open water swimming.

Athlete	Event	Time	Rank
Ivan Enderica Ochoa	Men's 5 km	53:36.7	7
Ivan Enderica Ochoa	Men's 10 km	1:50:20.6	31
Santiago Enderica	Men's 10 km	1:50:20.2	30
Katia Barros	Women's 5 km	57:26.4	22
Nataly Caldas	Women's 5 km	1:01:41.7	32
Nataly Caldas	Women's 10 km	2:04:28.8	38
Ivan Enderica Ochoa; Santiago Enderica; Nataly Caldas	Mixed team	1:00:32.6	20

== Swimming ==
Ecuadorian swimmers achieved qualifying standards in the following events (up to a maximum of 2 swimmers in each event at the A-standard entry time, and 1 at the B-standard):

Men

Athlete	Event	Heat		Semifinal		Final	
Athlete	Event	Time	Rank	Time	Rank	Time	Rank
Tyrone Alvarado	50 m butterfly	26.13	56	did not advance			
Tyrone Alvarado	100 m butterfly	56.27	42	did not advance			
Esteban Enderica	1500 m freestyle	15:27.90	27	—N/a		did not advance	
Esteban Enderica	200 m butterfly	2:01.46 NR	27	did not advance			

Women

Athlete	Event	Heat		Semifinal		Final	
Athlete	Event	Time	Rank	Time	Rank	Time	Rank
Samantha Arevalo	800 m freestyle	8:35.99 NR	16	—N/a		did not advance	
Samantha Arevalo	400 m individual medley	4:50.03	24	—N/a		did not advance	
Yamilé Bahamonde	50 m freestyle	26.46	41	did not advance			
Yamilé Bahamonde	100 m freestyle	57.79	45	did not advance			
