= Italy at the 2013 World Aquatics Championships =

- Flag of Italy
- World Aquatics code: ITA
- National federation: Federazione Italiana Nuoto
- Website: www.federnuoto.it

in Barcelona, Spain
- Medals Ranked 11th: Gold 1 Silver 3 Bronze 1 Total 5

World Aquatics Championships appearances (overview)
- 1973; 1975; 1978; 1982; 1986; 1991; 1994; 1998; 2001; 2003; 2005; 2007; 2009; 2011; 2013; 2015; 2017; 2019; 2022; 2023; 2024; 2025

Italy competed at the 2013 World Aquatics Championships in Barcelona, Spain between 19 July and 4 August 2013.

== Medalists ==
Medal	Name	Sport	Event	Date
Gold	Martina Grimaldi	Open water swimming	Women's 25 km	27 July
Silver	Tania Cagnotto; Francesca Dallapè	Diving	Women's 3 m synchronized springboard	20 July
Silver	Tania Cagnotto	Diving	Women's 1 m springboard	23 July
Silver	Federica Pellegrini	Swimming	Women's 200 m freestyle	31 July
Bronze	Gregorio Paltrinieri	Swimming	Men's 1500 m freestyle	4 August

== Diving ==
Italy qualified 11 quota places for the following diving events.

Men

Athlete	Event	Preliminaries		Semifinals		Final	
Athlete	Event	Points	Rank	Points	Rank	Points	Rank
Michele Benedetti	1 m springboard	303.10	26	—		did not advance	
Andreas Billi	1 m springboard	292.30	31	—		did not advance	
Michele Benedetti	3 m springboard	383.95	19	did not advance			
Tommaso Rinaldi	3 m springboard	356.40	28	did not advance			
Andrea Chiarabini	10 m platform	418.60	10 Q	451.70	9 Q	370.75	12
Maicol Verzotto	10 m platform	355.10	22	did not advance			
Andreas Billi; Giovanni Tocci	3 m synchronized springboard	372.96	11 Q	—		362.88	12
Francesco Dell'Uomo; Maicol Verzotto	10 m synchronized platform	376.68	8 Q	—		386.25	7

Women

Athlete	Event	Preliminaries		Semifinals		Final	
Athlete	Event	Points	Rank	Points	Rank	Points	Rank
Tania Cagnotto	1 m springboard	284.85	2 Q	—		307.00	2nd place, silver medalist(s)
Maria Marconi	1 m springboard	221.55	23	—		did not advance	
Tania Cagnotto	3 m springboard	312.60	3 Q	325.80	5 Q	345.45	4
Maria Marconi	3 m springboard	308.05	5 Q	301.75	10 Q	334.05	6
Noemi Batki	10 m platform	244.90	31	did not advance			
Tania Cagnotto; Francesca Dallapè	3 m synchronized springboard	302.40	2 Q	—		307.80	2nd place, silver medalist(s)

== Open water swimming ==
Italy qualified 10 quota places for the following events in open water swimming.

Men

Athlete	Event	Time	Rank
Valerio Cleri	10 km	1:49:30.5	14
Valerio Cleri	25 km	4:55:16.5	21
Luca Ferretti	5 km	53:47.1	24
Simone Ruffini	25 km	4:47:42.7	7
Mario Sanzullo	10 km	1:51:07.7	43
Federico Vanelli	5 km	53:42.3	16

Women

Athlete	Event	Time	Rank
Rachele Bruni	5 km	56:48.1	10
Rachele Bruni	10 km	2:00:03.2	31
Alice Franco	25 km	5:07:22.9	4
Martina Grimaldi	5 km	56:46.3	7
Martina Grimaldi	10 km	1:58:24.9	12
Martina Grimaldi	25 km	5:07:19.7	1st place, gold medalist(s)

Mixed

Athlete	Event	Time	Rank
Simone Ercoli; Luca Ferretti; Rachele Bruni	Team	54:34.0	5

== Swimming ==
Italian swimmers achieved qualifying standards in the following events (up to a maximum of 2 swimmers in each event at the A-standard entry time, and 1 at the B-standard):

Men

Athlete	Event	Heat		Semifinal		Final	
Athlete	Event	Time	Rank	Time	Rank	Time	Rank
Marco Belotti	200 m freestyle	1:48.66	21	did not advance			
Piero Codia	50 m butterfly	23.21	5 Q	23.50	15	did not advance	
Gabriele Detti	400 m freestyle	3:49.78	14	—		did not advance	
Gabriele Detti	800 m freestyle	7:56.15	11	—		did not advance	
Gabriele Detti	1500 m freestyle	15:18.04	19	—		did not advance	
Alex di Giorgio	200 m freestyle	1:48.47	18	did not advance			
Mirco di Tora	50 m backstroke	25.54	17	did not advance			
Mirco di Tora	100 m backstroke	54.76	18	did not advance			
Luca Dotto	50 m freestyle	22.45	21	did not advance			
Luca Dotto	100 m freestyle	48.88	=10 Q	48.46	8 Q	48.58	8
Filippo Magnini	100 m freestyle	49.02	13 Q	49.12	16	did not advance	
Luca Marin	400 m individual medley	4:17.71	14	—		did not advance	
Marco Orsi	50 m freestyle	22.61	23	did not advance			
Gregorio Paltrinieri	800 m freestyle	7:52.33	7 Q	—		7:50.29	6
Gregorio Paltrinieri	1500 m freestyle	14:57.15	4 Q	—		14:45.37	3rd place, bronze medalist(s)
Francesco Pavone	200 m butterfly	1:58.68	21	did not advance			
Mattia Pesce	50 m breaststroke	27.52	=13 Q	27.42	7 Q	27.53	8
Mattia Pesce	100 m breaststroke	1:00.32	14 Q	1:01.06	16	did not advance	
Samuel Pizzetti	400 m freestyle	3:53.26	22	—		did not advance	
Luca Pizzini	200 m breaststroke	2:11.93	18	did not advance			
Matteo Rivolta	50 m butterfly	23.65	=18	did not advance			
Matteo Rivolta	100 m butterfly	52.00	=5 Q	51.64 NR	6 Q	51.65	=7
Fabio Scozzoli	50 m breaststroke	27.60	18	did not advance			
Fabio Scozzoli	100 m breaststroke	59.88	=3 Q	59.90	7 Q	59.70	5
Federico Turrini	200 m backstroke	1:58.54	13 Q	1:59.16	15	did not advance	
Federico Turrini	200 m individual medley	2:00.02	19	did not advance			
Federico Turrini	400 m individual medley	4:15.96	10	—		did not advance	
Luca Dotto; Filippo Magnini; Luca Leonardi; Michele Santucci	4×100 m freestyle relay	3:14.13	7 Q	—		3:12.62	5
Marco Belotti; Alex di Giorgio; Damiano Lestingi; Filippo Magnini	4×200 m freestyle relay	7:13.60	10	—		did not advance	
Mirco di Tora; Marco Orsi; Matteo Rivolta; Fabio Scozzoli	4×100 m medley relay	3:34.29	6 Q	—		3:34.06	6

Women

Athlete	Event	Heat		Semifinal		Final	
Athlete	Event	Time	Rank	Time	Rank	Time	Rank
Ilaria Bianchi	50 m butterfly	26.63	19	did not advance			
Ilaria Bianchi	100 m butterfly	58.22	7 Q	58.29	7 Q	58.11	6
Martina Caramignoli	1500 m freestyle	16:15.65	10	—		did not advance	
Diletta Carli	400 m freestyle	4:13.89	19	—		did not advance	
Martina de Memme	400 m freestyle	4:08.42	11	—		did not advance	
Martina de Memme	800 m freestyle	8:26.95	6 Q	—		8:29.37	7
Silvia di Pietro	50 m freestyle	25.24	17	did not advance			
Silvia di Pietro	50 m butterfly	26.31	=8 Q	26.35	12	did not advance	
Erika Ferraioli	100 m freestyle	55.54	24	did not advance			
Lisa Fissneider	50 m breaststroke	31.94	27	did not advance			
Lisa Fissneider	100 m breaststroke	1:08.53	19	did not advance			
Michela Guzzetti	50 m breaststroke	31.51	17	did not advance			
Michela Guzzetti	100 m breaststroke	1:09.54	28	did not advance			
Alice Mizzau	200 m freestyle	1:58.10	12 Q	1:58.05	13	did not advance	
Federica Pellegrini	200 m freestyle	1:56.79	3 Q	1:55.78	1 Q	1:55.14	2nd place, silver medalist(s)
Federica Pellegrini	200 m backstroke	2:10.65	10 Q	2:09.97	9	did not advance	
Stefania Pirozzi	200 m butterfly	2:08.50	8 Q	2:08.09	11	did not advance	
Stefania Pirozzi	200 m individual medley	2:14.98	=23	did not advance			
Stefania Pirozzi	400 m individual medley	4:42.33	13	—		did not advance	
Silvia di Pietro; Erika Ferraioli; Alice Mizzau; Federica Pellegrini	4×100 m freestyle relay	3:39.50	10	—		did not advance	
Diletta Carli; Martina de Memme; Alice Mizzau; Federica Pellegrini	4×200 m freestyle relay	7.57.41	8 Q	—		7:57.91	7
Ilaria Bianchi; Erika Ferraioli; Lisa Fissneider; Federica Pellegrini	4×100 m medley relay	DSQ		—		did not advance	

== Synchronized swimming ==
Italy has qualified twelve synchronized swimmers.

Athlete	Event	Preliminaries		Final	
Athlete	Event	Points	Rank	Points	Rank
Linda Cerruti	Solo free routine	88.580	8 Q	87.590	8
Linda Cerruti	Solo technical routine	88.400	8 Q	89.200	8
Linda Cerruti; Costanza Ferro	Duet free routine	89.630	6 Q	89.170	6
Linda Cerruti; Costanza Ferro	Duet technical routine	87.300	9 Q	87.800	9
Elisa Bozzo; Beatrice Callegari; Camilla Cattaneo; Manila Flamini; Giulia Lapi; Mariangela Perrupato; Dalita Schiesaro; Sara Sgarzi	Team free routine	89.880	5 Q	89.840	5
Elisa Bozzo; Beatrice Callegari; Camilla Cattaneo; Manila Flamini; Giulia Lapi; Mariangela Perrupato; Dalita Schiesaro; Sara Sgarzi	Team technical routine	89.600	6 Q	89.900	6
Elisa Bozzo; Beatrice Callegari; Camilla Cattaneo; Francesca Deidda; Manila Flamini; Giulia Lapi; Mariangela Perrupato; Alessia Pezone; Dalita Schiesaro; Sara Sgarzi	Free routine combination	89.030	6 Q	89.550	6

== Water polo ==
=== Men's tournament ===
Team roster

- Stefano Tempesti
- Amaurys Pérez
- Niccolò Gitto
- Pietro Figlioli
- Alex Giorgetti
- Maurizio Felugo
- Niccolò Figari
- Valentino Gallo
- Christian Presciutti
- Deni Fiorentini
- Matteo Aicardi
- Christian Napolitano
- Marco Del Lungo

Group play

	Pld	W	D	L	GF	GA	GD	Pts
Italy	3	3	0	0	32	18	+14	6
Germany	3	2	0	1	26	26	0	4
Kazakhstan	3	1	0	2	21	25	−4	2
Romania	3	0	0	3	16	26	−10	0

22 July 2013; 18:50	Report	Italy	10–4	Romania	Piscines Bernat Picornell, Barcelona; Attendance: 600; Referees: Peris (CRO), Koryzna (POL)
22 July 2013; 18:50	Report	Score by quarters: 4–1, 1–1, 2–2, 2–0			Piscines Bernat Picornell, Barcelona; Attendance: 600; Referees: Peris (CRO), Koryzna (POL)
22 July 2013; 18:50	Report	Aicardi 3	Goals	four players 1	Piscines Bernat Picornell, Barcelona; Attendance: 600; Referees: Peris (CRO), Koryzna (POL)

24 July 2013; 18:50	Report	Italy	10–8	Germany	Piscines Bernat Picornell, Barcelona; Attendance: 600; Referees: Borrell (ESP), Terepenka (CAN)
24 July 2013; 18:50	Report	Score by quarters: 3–1, 3–1, 3–3, 1–3			Piscines Bernat Picornell, Barcelona; Attendance: 600; Referees: Borrell (ESP), Terepenka (CAN)
24 July 2013; 18:50	Report	three players 2	Goals	Real, Schlotterbeck 2	Piscines Bernat Picornell, Barcelona; Attendance: 600; Referees: Borrell (ESP), Terepenka (CAN)

26 July 2013; 12:10	Report	Italy	12–6	Kazakhstan	Piscines Bernat Picornell, Barcelona; Attendance: 700; Referees: Peris (CRO), Abramović (MNE)
26 July 2013; 12:10	Report	Score by quarters: 3–0, 3–2, 2–1, 4–3			Piscines Bernat Picornell, Barcelona; Attendance: 700; Referees: Peris (CRO), Abramović (MNE)
26 July 2013; 12:10	Report	Figlioli 4	Goals	Koliadenko 2	Piscines Bernat Picornell, Barcelona; Attendance: 700; Referees: Peris (CRO), Abramović (MNE)

Round of 16

28 July 2013; 20:10	Report	Italy	11–3	China	Piscines Bernat Picornell, Barcelona; Attendance: 600; Referees: Margeta (SLO), Terepenka (CAN)
28 July 2013; 20:10	Report	Score by quarters: 3–1, 3–1, 3–0, 2–1			Piscines Bernat Picornell, Barcelona; Attendance: 600; Referees: Margeta (SLO), Terepenka (CAN)
28 July 2013; 20:10	Report	Giorgetti 4	Goals	three players 1	Piscines Bernat Picornell, Barcelona; Attendance: 600; Referees: Margeta (SLO), Terepenka (CAN)

Quarterfinal

30 July 2013; 21:45	Report	Spain	3–4	Italy	Piscines Bernat Picornell, Barcelona; Attendance: 4,500; Referees: Stavridis (GRE), Alexandrescu (ROU)
30 July 2013; 21:45	Report	Score by quarters: 2–2, 1–1, 0–1, 0–0			Piscines Bernat Picornell, Barcelona; Attendance: 4,500; Referees: Stavridis (GRE), Alexandrescu (ROU)
30 July 2013; 21:45	Report	three players 1	Goals	Figlioli 2	Piscines Bernat Picornell, Barcelona; Attendance: 4,500; Referees: Stavridis (GRE), Alexandrescu (ROU)

Semifinal

1 August 2013; 21:45	Report	Montenegro	10–8	Italy	Piscines Bernat Picornell, Barcelona; Attendance: 2,500; Referees: Margeta (SLO), Koryzna (POL)
1 August 2013; 21:45	Report	Score by quarters: 3–1, 2–0, 4–3, 1–4			Piscines Bernat Picornell, Barcelona; Attendance: 2,500; Referees: Margeta (SLO), Koryzna (POL)
1 August 2013; 21:45	Report	Janović 3	Goals	Figlioli, Aicardi 3	Piscines Bernat Picornell, Barcelona; Attendance: 2,500; Referees: Margeta (SLO), Koryzna (POL)

Third place game

3 August 2013; 16:30	Report	Croatia	10–8	Italy	Piscines Bernat Picornell, Barcelona; Attendance: 2,500; Referees: Stavridis (GRE), Alexandrescu (ROU)
3 August 2013; 16:30	Report	Score by quarters: 4–2, 4–1, 1–2, 1–3			Piscines Bernat Picornell, Barcelona; Attendance: 2,500; Referees: Stavridis (GRE), Alexandrescu (ROU)
3 August 2013; 16:30	Report	Sukno, Joković 3	Goals	Giorgetti 3	Piscines Bernat Picornell, Barcelona; Attendance: 2,500; Referees: Stavridis (GRE), Alexandrescu (ROU)

=== Women's tournament ===
Team roster

- Elena Gigli
- Francesca Pomeri
- Arianna Garibotti
- Federica Radicchi
- Elisa Queirolo
- Rosaria Aiello
- Tania Di Mario
- Roberta Bianconi
- Giulia Enrica Emmolo
- Valeria Palmieri
- Aleksandra Cotti
- Teresa Frassinetti
- Loredana Sparano

Group play

	Pld	W	D	L	GF	GA	GD	Pts
Hungary	3	3	0	0	48	17	+31	6
Italy	3	2	0	1	26	22	+4	4
Kazakhstan	3	1	0	2	23	32	−9	2
Brazil	3	0	0	3	16	42	−26	0

21 July 2013; 20:10	Report	Italy	9–7	Kazakhstan	Piscines Bernat Picornell, Barcelona; Attendance: 600; Referees: Taylan (TUR), Ni (CHN)
21 July 2013; 20:10	Report	Score by quarters: 1–3, 5–0, 2–3, 1–1			Piscines Bernat Picornell, Barcelona; Attendance: 600; Referees: Taylan (TUR), Ni (CHN)
21 July 2013; 20:10	Report	Di Mario 3	Goals	Akilbayeva, Gritsenko 2	Piscines Bernat Picornell, Barcelona; Attendance: 600; Referees: Taylan (TUR), Ni (CHN)

23 July 2013; 18:50	Report	Hungary	10–4	Italy	Piscines Bernat Picornell, Barcelona; Attendance: 400; Referees: Borrell (ESP), Margeta (SLO)
23 July 2013; 18:50	Report	Score by quarters: 3–1, 3–1, 3–1, 1–1			Piscines Bernat Picornell, Barcelona; Attendance: 400; Referees: Borrell (ESP), Margeta (SLO)
23 July 2013; 18:50	Report	Keszthelyi, Bujka 4	Goals	four players 1	Piscines Bernat Picornell, Barcelona; Attendance: 400; Referees: Borrell (ESP), Margeta (SLO)

25 July 2013; 13:30	Report	Italy	13–5	Brazil	Piscines Bernat Picornell, Barcelona; Attendance: 200; Referees: Skovpina (UZB), Koganov (AZE)
25 July 2013; 13:30	Report	Score by quarters: 2–1, 6–0, 2–1, 3–3			Piscines Bernat Picornell, Barcelona; Attendance: 200; Referees: Skovpina (UZB), Koganov (AZE)
25 July 2013; 13:30	Report	three players 3	Goals	Zablith 2	Piscines Bernat Picornell, Barcelona; Attendance: 200; Referees: Skovpina (UZB), Koganov (AZE)

Round of 16

27 July 2013; 21:30	Report	Italy	12–13 (OT)	Greece	Piscines Bernat Picornell, Barcelona; Attendance: 400; Referees: Margeta (SLO), Borrell (ESP)
27 July 2013; 21:30	Report	Score by quarters: 2–2, 2–3, 1–2, 4–2 OT: 1–1, 0–0 pen. 2–3			Piscines Bernat Picornell, Barcelona; Attendance: 400; Referees: Margeta (SLO), Borrell (ESP)
27 July 2013; 21:30	Report	Bianconi 3	Goals	Manolioudaki 4	Piscines Bernat Picornell, Barcelona; Attendance: 400; Referees: Margeta (SLO), Borrell (ESP)
