= Kazakhstan at the 2013 World Aquatics Championships =

- Flag of Kazakhstan
- FINA code: KAZ
- National federation: Swimming Federation of the Republic of Kazakhstan
- Website: www.aquatics.kz/en

in Barcelona, Spain
- Medals: Gold 0 Silver 0 Bronze 0 Total 0

World Aquatics Championships appearances
- 1994; 1998; 2001; 2003; 2005; 2007; 2009; 2011; 2013; 2015; 2017; 2019; 2022; 2023; 2024

Other related appearances
- Soviet Union (1973–1991)

Kazakhstan is competing at the 2013 World Aquatics Championships in Barcelona, Spain between 19 July and 4 August 2013.

== Open water swimming ==
Kazakhstan qualified five quota places for the following events in open water swimming.

Athlete	Event	Time	Rank
Vitaliy Khudyakov	Men's 5 km	54:24.8	37
Vitaliy Khudyakov	Men's 10 km	1:51:42.8	49
Vitaliy Khudyakov	Men's 25 km	4:58:18.1	24
Vladimir Tolikin	Men's 5 km	57:40.9	43
Vladimir Tolikin	Men's 10 km	2:04:47.6	56
Anna Gakhokidze	Women's 5 km	1:06:25.6	39
Mariya Ivanova	Women's 5 km	1:05:19.0	37
Mariya Ivanova	Women's 10 km	2:19:02.6	48
Xeniya Romanchuk	Women's 10 km	2:05:21.1	44
Xeniya Romanchuk	Women's 25 km	5:43:40.5	18
Vitaliy Khudyakov; Vladimir Tolikin; Xeniya Romanchuk	Mixed team	1:00:15.8	19

== Swimming ==
Kazakhstani swimmers achieved qualifying standards in the following events (up to a maximum of 2 swimmers in each event at the A-standard entry time, and 1 at the B-standard):

Men

Athlete	Event	Heat		Semifinal		Final	
Athlete	Event	Time	Rank	Time	Rank	Time	Rank
Dmitriy Balandin	100 m breaststroke	1:01.58	31	did not advance			
Dmitriy Balandin	200 m breaststroke	2:13.53	24	did not advance			
Alexandr Tarabrin	50 m backstroke	26.39	29	did not advance			
Alexandr Tarabrin	100 m backstroke	55.70	26	did not advance			
Alexandr Tarabrin	200 m backstroke	2:01.08	22	did not advance			

Women

Athlete	Event	Heat		Semifinal		Final	
Athlete	Event	Time	Rank	Time	Rank	Time	Rank
Elmira Aigaliyeva	50 m freestyle	26.22	36	did not advance			
Elmira Aigaliyeva	100 m freestyle	55.89	30	did not advance			
Elmira Aigaliyeva	50 m butterfly	26.76	23	did not advance			
Elmira Aigaliyeva	100 m butterfly	1:00.00	25	did not advance			
Yekaterina Rudenko	50 m backstroke	29.19	30	did not advance			
Yekaterina Rudenko	100 m backstroke	1:02.49	27	did not advance			

== Synchronized swimming ==
Kazakhstan has qualified twelve synchronized swimmers.

Athlete	Event	Preliminaries		Final	
Athlete	Event	Points	Rank	Points	Rank
Alexandra Nemich; Yekaterina Nemich	Duet free routine	80.110	16	did not advance	
Alexandra Nemich; Yekaterina Nemich	Duet technical routine	78.000	16 Q	78.300	16
Aigerim Anarbayeva; Aigerim Issayeva; Xeniya Kachurina*; Yuliya Kempel; Ainur Kerey*; Alina Matkova; Aisulu Nauryzbayeva; Kristina Tynbayeva; Amina Yermakhanova; Aigerim Zhexembinova	Team free routine	78.180	13	did not advance	
Aigerim Anarbayeva; Aigerim Issayeva; Xeniya Kachurina*; Yuliya Kempel; Ainur Kerey*; Alina Matkova; Aisulu Nauryzbayeva; Kristina Tynbayeva; Amina Yermakhanova; Aigerim Zhexembinova	Team technical routine	81.600	13	did not advance	
Aigerim Anarbayeva; Aigerim Issayeva; Xeniya Kachurina; Yuliya Kempel*; Ainur Kerey; Alina Matkova*; Aisulu Nauryzbayeva; Alexandra Nemich; Yekaterina Nemich; Kristina Tynbayeva; Amina Yermakhanova; Aigerim Zhexembinova	Free routine combination	78.600	14	did not advance	

== Water polo ==
=== Men's tournament ===
Team roster

- Nikolay Maksimov
- Sergey Gubarev
- Yevgeniy Medvedev
- Roman Pilipenko
- Murat Shakenov
- Alexey Shmider
- Vladimir Ushakov
- Anton Koliadenko
- Rustam Ukumanov
- Mikhail Ruday
- Ravil Manafov
- Branko Pekovich
- Valeriy Shlemov

Group play

	Pld	W	D	L	GF	GA	GD	Pts
Italy	3	3	0	0	32	18	+14	6
Germany	3	2	0	1	26	26	0	4
Kazakhstan	3	1	0	2	21	25	−4	2
Romania	3	0	0	3	16	26	−10	0

22 July 2013; 20:10	Report	Germany	9–8	Kazakhstan	Piscines Bernat Picornell, Barcelona; Attendance: 800; Referees: Terepenka (CAN), Koganov (AZE)
22 July 2013; 20:10	Report	Score by quarters: 3–3, 3–0, 3–1, 0–4			Piscines Bernat Picornell, Barcelona; Attendance: 800; Referees: Terepenka (CAN), Koganov (AZE)
22 July 2013; 20:10	Report	Nossek 3	Goals	Ushakov 3	Piscines Bernat Picornell, Barcelona; Attendance: 800; Referees: Terepenka (CAN), Koganov (AZE)

24 July 2013; 17:30	Report	Kazakhstan	7–4	Romania	Piscines Bernat Picornell, Barcelona; Attendance: 600; Referees: Peris (CRO), Stavridis (GRE)
24 July 2013; 17:30	Report	Score by quarters: 1–0, 2–2, 4–1, 0–1			Piscines Bernat Picornell, Barcelona; Attendance: 600; Referees: Peris (CRO), Stavridis (GRE)
24 July 2013; 17:30	Report	Shmider, Medvedev 2	Goals	four players 1	Piscines Bernat Picornell, Barcelona; Attendance: 600; Referees: Peris (CRO), Stavridis (GRE)

26 July 2013; 12:10	Report	Italy	12–6	Kazakhstan	Piscines Bernat Picornell, Barcelona; Attendance: 700; Referees: Peris (CRO), Abramović (MNE)
26 July 2013; 12:10	Report	Score by quarters: 3–0, 3–2, 2–1, 4–3			Piscines Bernat Picornell, Barcelona; Attendance: 700; Referees: Peris (CRO), Abramović (MNE)
26 July 2013; 12:10	Report	Figlioli 4	Goals	Koliadenko 2	Piscines Bernat Picornell, Barcelona; Attendance: 700; Referees: Peris (CRO), Abramović (MNE)

Round of 16

28 July 2013; 18:50	Report	Hungary	16–7	Kazakhstan	Piscines Bernat Picornell, Barcelona; Attendance: 700; Referees: Reemnet (NED), Koryzna (POL)
28 July 2013; 18:50	Report	Score by quarters: 2–4, 7–1, 6–1, 1–1			Piscines Bernat Picornell, Barcelona; Attendance: 700; Referees: Reemnet (NED), Koryzna (POL)
28 July 2013; 18:50	Report	five players 2	Goals	Gubarev 3	Piscines Bernat Picornell, Barcelona; Attendance: 700; Referees: Reemnet (NED), Koryzna (POL)

=== Women's tournament ===
Team roster

- Alexandra Zharkova
- Natalya Shepelina
- Aizhan Akilbayeva
- Anna Turova
- Anastassiya Mirshina
- Anna Zubkova
- Natalya Alexandrova
- Yekaterina Glushkova
- Assel Jakayeva
- Marina Gritsenko
- Alexandra Rozhentseva
- Assem Mussarova
- Kristina Krassikova

Group play

	Pld	W	D	L	GF	GA	GD	Pts
Hungary	3	3	0	0	48	17	+31	6
Italy	3	2	0	1	26	22	+4	4
Kazakhstan	3	1	0	2	23	32	−9	2
Brazil	3	0	0	3	16	42	−26	0

21 July 2013; 20:10	Report	Italy	9–7	Kazakhstan	Piscines Bernat Picornell, Barcelona; Attendance: 600; Referees: Taylan (TUR), Ni (CHN)
21 July 2013; 20:10	Report	Score by quarters: 1–3, 5–0, 2–3, 1–1			Piscines Bernat Picornell, Barcelona; Attendance: 600; Referees: Taylan (TUR), Ni (CHN)
21 July 2013; 20:10	Report	Di Mario 3	Goals	Akilbayeva, Gritsenko 2	Piscines Bernat Picornell, Barcelona; Attendance: 600; Referees: Taylan (TUR), Ni (CHN)

23 July 2013; 17:30	Report	Kazakhstan	9–5	Brazil	Piscines Bernat Picornell, Barcelona; Attendance: 410; Referees: Taylan (TUR), Golijanin (SRB)
23 July 2013; 17:30	Report	Score by quarters: 2–2, 3–0, 2–0, 2–3			Piscines Bernat Picornell, Barcelona; Attendance: 410; Referees: Taylan (TUR), Golijanin (SRB)
23 July 2013; 17:30	Report	Jakayeva, Gritsenko 2	Goals	Chiappini 3	Piscines Bernat Picornell, Barcelona; Attendance: 410; Referees: Taylan (TUR), Golijanin (SRB)

25 July 2013; 12:10	Report	Hungary	18–7	Kazakhstan	Piscines Bernat Picornell, Barcelona; Attendance: 200; Referees: Williams (NZL), Bender (GER)
25 July 2013; 12:10	Report	Score by quarters: 8–1, 4–2, 3–2, 3–2			Piscines Bernat Picornell, Barcelona; Attendance: 200; Referees: Williams (NZL), Bender (GER)
25 July 2013; 12:10	Report	Bujka 3	Goals	Jakayeva 4	Piscines Bernat Picornell, Barcelona; Attendance: 200; Referees: Williams (NZL), Bender (GER)

Round of 16

27 July 2013; 18:50	Report	Canada	14–8	Kazakhstan	Piscines Bernat Picornell, Barcelona; Attendance: 300; Referees: Williams (NZL), Taylan (TUR)
27 July 2013; 18:50	Report	Score by quarters: 4–2, 5–1, 3–3, 2–2			Piscines Bernat Picornell, Barcelona; Attendance: 300; Referees: Williams (NZL), Taylan (TUR)
27 July 2013; 18:50	Report	Eggens 4	Goals	Shepelina, Gritsenko 2	Piscines Bernat Picornell, Barcelona; Attendance: 300; Referees: Williams (NZL), Taylan (TUR)
