= Muratore =

Muratore is a surname. Notable people with the surname include:

- Horacio Muratore (1951–2026), Argentine basketball executive
- John Muratore, American engineer
- Lucien Muratore (1876–1954), French actor and opera singer
- Matt Muratore, American politician
- Simone Muratore (born 1998), Italian footballer
- Victoria Muratore (born 1994), Brazilian water polo player
