= Jahir Ocampo =

Mexican diver

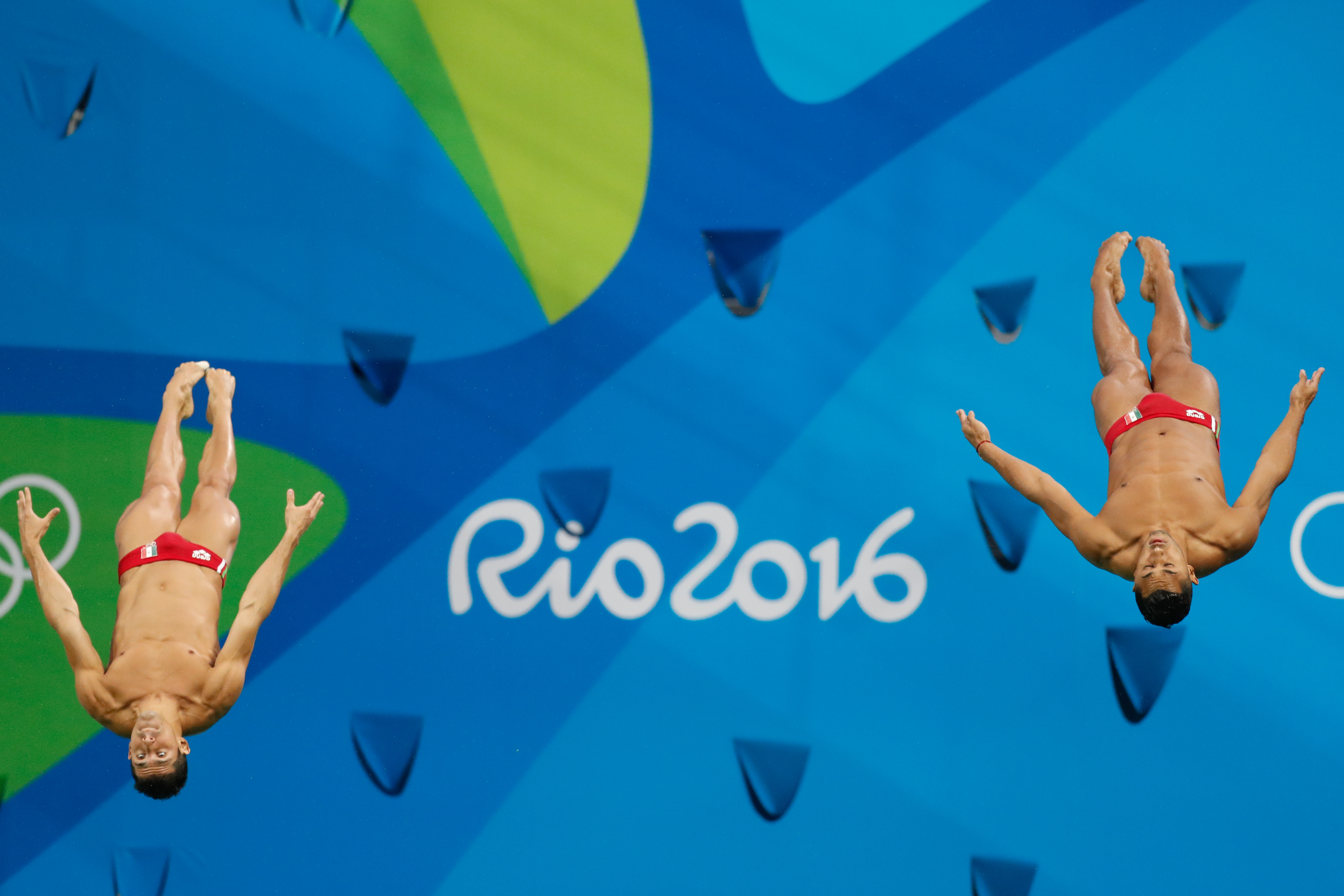
- Jahir Ocampo (right) and Rommel Pacheco at the 2016 Olympics

Personal information
- Full name: Jahir Ocampo Marroquín
- Born: 12 January 1990 (age 36) State of Mexico, Mexico
- Height: 1.78 m (5 ft 10 in)
- Weight: 80 kg (176 lb)

Sport
- Country: Mexico
- Sport: Diving
Medal record
Men's diving
Representing Mexico
World Championships
Silver medal – second place	2023 Fukuoka	Team
Silver medal – second place	2024 Doha	Team event
Bronze medal – third place	2013 Barcelona	3 m synchro
Pan American Games
Gold medal – first place	2015 Toronto	3 m synchro
Silver medal – second place	2015 Toronto	3 m springboard

Jahir Ocampo Marroquín (born 12 January 1990) is a Mexican diver who won the bronze medal at the 2013 World Aquatics Championships in Barcelona in the synchronized 3 metre springboard event with his partner Rommel Pacheco.
