= Swimming at the 2013 World Aquatics Championships – Men's 200 metre backstroke =

Men's 200 metre backstroke at the 2013 World Aquatics Championships
- Venue: Palau Sant Jordi
- Date: August 1, 2013 (heats & semifinals); August 2, 2013 (final)
- Competitors: 35 from 30 nations
- Winning time: 1:53.79

Medalists
| gold medal | Ryan Lochte | United States |
| silver medal | Radosław Kawęcki | Poland |
| bronze medal | Tyler Clary | United States |

Barcelona Palau San Jordi

The men's 200 metre backstroke event in swimming at the 2013 World Aquatics Championships took place on 1–2 August July at the Palau Sant Jordi in Barcelona, Spain.

== Records ==
Prior to this competition, the existing world and championship records were:

| World record | Aaron Peirsol (USA) | 1:51.92 | Rome, Italy | 31 July 2009 |
| Competition record | Aaron Peirsol (USA) | 1:51.92 | Rome, Italy | 31 July 2009 |

== Results ==
=== Heats ===
The heats were held at 10:21.

| Rank | Heat | Lane | Name | Nationality | Time | Notes |
|---|---|---|---|---|---|---|
| 1 | 4 | 4 | Tyler Clary | United States | 1:56.76 | Q |
| 2 | 2 | 5 | Craig McNally | Great Britain | 1:57.18 | Q |
| 3 | 2 | 4 | Ryan Lochte | United States | 1:57.19 | Q |
| 4 | 4 | 3 | Péter Bernek | Hungary | 1:57.20 | Q |
| 5 | 2 | 3 | Yannick Lebherz | Germany | 1:57.33 | Q |
| 6 | 3 | 3 | Matson Lawson | Australia | 1:57.48 | Q |
| 7 | 4 | 5 | Kosuke Hagino | Japan | 1:57.52 | Q |
| 8 | 3 | 4 | Ryosuke Irie | Japan | 1:57.53 | Q |
| 9 | 4 | 2 | Chris Walker-Hebborn | Great Britain | 1:57.95 | Q |
| 10 | 3 | 6 | Gábor Balog | Hungary | 1:57.98 | Q |
| 11 | 3 | 5 | Radosław Kawęcki | Poland | 1:57.99 | Q |
| 12 | 4 | 7 | Xu Jiayu | China | 1:58.29 | Q |
| 13 | 3 | 7 | Federico Turrini | Italy | 1:58.54 | Q |
| 14 | 4 | 1 | Danas Rapšys | Lithuania | 1:59.11 | Q |
| 15 | 2 | 2 | Leonardo de Deus | Brazil | 1:59.17 | Q |
| 16 | 2 | 1 | Darren Murray | South Africa | 1:59.19 | Q |
| 17 | 4 | 6 | Mitch Larkin | Australia | 1:59.34 | |
| 18 | 3 | 2 | Yakov-Yan Toumarkin | Israel | 1:59.39 | |
| 19 | 2 | 7 | Pedro Oliveira | Portugal | 1:59.95 | |
| 20 | 3 | 8 | Lukas Rauftlin | Switzerland | 2:00.45 | |
| 21 | 4 | 0 | Russell Wood | Canada | 2:00.51 | |
| 22 | 3 | 1 | Alexandr Tarabrin | Kazakhstan | 2:01.08 | |
| 23 | 2 | 8 | Im Tae-Jeong | South Korea | 2:01.23 | |
| 24 | 2 | 6 | Gareth Kean | New Zealand | 2:02.81 | |
| 25 | 2 | 0 | Jean-François Schneiders | Luxembourg | 2:02.96 | |
| 26 | 3 | 0 | Marko Krce Rabar | Croatia | 2:03.50 | |
| 27 | 4 | 8 | Pedro Medel | Cuba | 2:03.63 | |
| 28 | 2 | 9 | I Gede Siman Sudartawa | Indonesia | 2:04.90 | |
| 29 | 3 | 9 | Ezequiel Trujillo | Mexico | 2:05.92 | |
| 30 | 1 | 4 | Yeziel Morales | Puerto Rico | 2:06.09 | |
| 31 | 1 | 6 | Boris Kirillov | Azerbaijan | 2:08.74 | |
| 32 | 1 | 5 | Gorazd Chepishevski | North Macedonia | 2:09.89 | |
| 33 | 1 | 3 | Awse Ma'aya | Jordan | 2:12.31 | |
| 34 | 1 | 2 | Yaaqoub Al-Saadi | United Arab Emirates | 2:21.51 | |
| | 4 | 9 | Danil Bukin | Uzbekistan | | DSQ |

=== Semifinals ===
The semifinals were held at 19:20.

==== Semifinal 1 ====
| Rank | Lane | Name | Nationality | Time | Notes |
|---|---|---|---|---|---|
| 1 | 6 | Ryosuke Irie | Japan | 1:56.14 | Q |
| 2 | 7 | Xu Jiayu | China | 1:56.42 | Q |
| 3 | 4 | Craig McNally | Great Britain | 1:56.97 | Q |
| 4 | 5 | Péter Bernek | Hungary | 1:57.37 | Q |
| 5 | 2 | Gábor Balog | Hungary | 1:57.42 | |
| 6 | 3 | Matson Lawson | Australia | 1:57.55 | |
| 7 | 1 | Danas Rapšys | Lithuania | 1:59.05 | |
| 8 | 8 | Darren Murray | South Africa | 2:02.12 | |

==== Semifinal 2 ====
| Rank | Lane | Name | Nationality | Time | Notes |
|---|---|---|---|---|---|
| 1 | 4 | Tyler Clary | United States | 1:55.16 | Q |
| 2 | 5 | Ryan Lochte | United States | 1:55.88 | Q |
| 3 | 7 | Radosław Kawęcki | Poland | 1:56.14 | Q |
| 4 | 6 | Kosuke Hagino | Japan | 1:56.24 | Q |
| 5 | 3 | Yannick Lebherz | Germany | 1:57.71 | |
| 6 | 8 | Leonardo de Deus | Brazil | 1:57.92 | |
| 7 | 2 | Chris Walker-Hebborn | Great Britain | 1:58.16 | |
| 8 | 1 | Federico Turrini | Italy | 1:59.16 | |

=== Final ===
The final was held at 18:09.

| Rank | Lane | Name | Nationality | Time | Notes |
|---|---|---|---|---|---|
| 1st place, gold medalist(s) | 5 | Ryan Lochte | United States | 1:53.79 | |
| 2nd place, silver medalist(s) | 6 | Radosław Kawęcki | Poland | 1:54.24 | ER |
| 3rd place, bronze medalist(s) | 4 | Tyler Clary | United States | 1:54.64 | |
| 4 | 3 | Ryosuke Irie | Japan | 1:55.07 | |
| 5 | 2 | Kosuke Hagino | Japan | 1:55.43 | |
| 6 | 1 | Craig McNally | Great Britain | 1:55.67 | |
| 7 | 7 | Xu Jiayu | China | 1:57.13 | |
| 8 | 8 | Péter Bernek | Hungary | 1:58.26 | |
