= Swimming at the 2013 World Aquatics Championships – Men's 1500 metre freestyle =

Men's 1500 metre freestyle at the 2013 World Aquatics Championships
- Venue: Palau Sant Jordi
- Dates: August 3, 2013 (heats); August 4, 2013 (final)
- Competitors: 35 from 28 nations
- Winning time: 14:41.15

Medalists
gold medal	Sun Yang	China
silver medal	Ryan Cochrane	Canada
bronze medal	Gregorio Paltrinieri	Italy

Barcelona Palau San Jordi

The men's 1500 metre freestyle event in swimming at the 2013 World Aquatics Championships took place on 3–4 August at the Palau Sant Jordi in Barcelona, Spain.

== Records ==
Prior to this competition, the existing world and championship records were:

World record	Sun Yang (CHN)	14:31.02	London, Great Britain	4 August 2012
Competition record	Sun Yang (CHN)	14:34.14	Shanghai, China	31 July 2011

== Results ==
=== Heats ===
The heats were held at 10:49.

Rank	Heat	Lane	Name	Nationality	Time	Notes
1	4	4	Sun Yang	China	14:54.65	Q
2	3	4	Ryan Cochrane	Canada	14:55.15	Q
3	2	5	Connor Jaeger	United States	14:56.62	Q
4	4	5	Gregorio Paltrinieri	Italy	14:57.15	Q
5	3	8	Pál Joensen	Faroe Islands	14:57.76	Q
6	3	5	Jordan Harrison	Australia	14:58.62	Q
7	4	6	Michael McBroom	United States	14:59.73	Q
8	3	3	Daniel Fogg	Great Britain	15:00.48	Q
9	2	6	Ayatsugu Hirai	Japan	15:03.45	
10	4	3	Mateusz Sawrymowicz	Poland	15:06.45	
11	2	4	Oussama Mellouli	Tunisia	15:07.89	
12	2	2	Yohsuke Miyamoto	Japan	15:09.21	
12	3	2	Gergely Gyurta	Hungary	15:09.21	
14	4	1	Pawel Furtek	Poland	15:13.88	
15	4	0	Matias Koski	Finland	15:13.97	
16	2	1	Marc Sánchez	Spain	15:13.98	
17	2	9	Devon Brown	South Africa	15:14.51	
18	3	6	Serhiy Frolov	Ukraine	15:17.47	
19	2	3	Gabriele Detti	Italy	15:18.04	
20	3	9	Richárd Nagy	Slovakia	15:22.20	NR
21	4	7	Gergő Kis	Hungary	15:23.26	
22	4	8	Sören Meißner	Germany	15:23.33	
23	2	8	Enzo Vial-Collet	France	15:23.92	
24	3	7	Hao Yun	China	15:24.63	
25	4	2	Will Brothers	Canada	15:24.74	
26	3	1	Ahmed Akaram	Egypt	15:27.60	
27	3	0	Esteban Enderica	Ecuador	15:27.90	
28	1	6	Mateo de Angulo	Colombia	15:30.59	NR
29	1	5	Uladzimir Zhyharau	Belarus	15:30.65	
30	1	4	Ediz Yıldırımer	Turkey	15:38.46	
31	4	9	Alejandro Gómez	Venezuela	15:38.78	
32	2	0	Arturo Pérez Vertti	Mexico	15:41.38	
33	1	3	Kevin Yeap	Malaysia	15:46.72	
34	2	7	Martin Naidich	Argentina	15:56.17	
35	1	2	Matthew Lowe	Bahamas	16:07.53	NR

=== Final ===
The final was held at 18:46.

Rank	Lane	Name	Nationality	Time	Notes
1st place, gold medalist(s)	4	Sun Yang	China	14:41.15	
2nd place, silver medalist(s)	5	Ryan Cochrane	Canada	14:42.48	
3rd place, bronze medalist(s)	6	Gregorio Paltrinieri	Italy	14:45.37	NR
4	3	Connor Jaeger	United States	14:47.96	
5	1	Michael McBroom	United States	14:53.95	
6	7	Jordan Harrison	Australia	15:00.44	
7	2	Pál Joensen	Faroe Islands	15:03.10	
8	8	Daniel Fogg	Great Britain	15:05.92	
