= Germany at the 2013 World Aquatics Championships =

- Flag of Germany
- World Aquatics code: GER
- National federation: Deutscher Schwimm-Verband
- Website: www.dsv.de/home

in Barcelona, Spain
- Competitors: 62 in 6 sports
- Medals Ranked 7th: Gold 3 Silver 3 Bronze 4 Total 10

World Aquatics Championships appearances
- 1991; 1994; 1998; 2001; 2003; 2005; 2007; 2009; 2011; 2013; 2015; 2017; 2019; 2022; 2023; 2024; 2025

Other related appearances
- East Germany (1973–1986); West Germany (1973–1986)

Germany competed at the 2013 World Aquatics Championships in Barcelona, Spain between 20 July to 4 August 2013.

== Medalists ==
Medal	Name	Sport	Event	Date
Gold	Patrick Hausding; Sascha Klein	Diving	Men's 10 m synchronized platform	21 July
Gold	Thomas Lurz; Christian Reichert; Isabelle Härle	Open water swimming	Team	25 July
Gold	Thomas Lurz	Open water swimming	Men's 25 km	27 July
Silver	Thomas Lurz	Open water swimming	Men's 10 km	22 July
Silver	Angela Maurer	Open water swimming	Women's 25 km	27 July
Silver	Marco Koch	Swimming	Men's 200 m breaststroke	2 August
Bronze	Thomas Lurz	Open water swimming	Men's 5 km	20 July
Bronze	Angela Maurer	Open water swimming	Women's 10 km	23 July
Bronze	Sascha Klein	Diving	Men's 10 m platform	28 July
Bronze	Anna Bader	High diving	Women's high diving	30 July

== Diving ==
Germany nominated nine athletes to participate.

Men

Athlete	Event	Preliminaries		Semifinals		Final	
Athlete	Event	Points	Rank	Points	Rank	Points	Rank
Oliver Homuth	1 m springboard	362.20	8 Q	—N/a		386.75	10
Martin Wolfram	1 m springboard	361.50	9 Q	—N/a		398.05	8
Patrick Hausding	3 m springboard	409.40	13 Q	447.75	5 Q	445.75	7
Stephan Feck	3 m springboard	440.90	3 Q	361.35	18	Did not advance	
Sascha Klein	10 m platform	482.55	4 Q	505.85	3 Q	508.55	3rd place, bronze medalist(s)
Dominik Stein	10 m platform	403.45	15 Q	325.05	18	Did not advance	
Stephan Feck; Patrick Hausding	3 m synchronized springboard	427.68	3 Q	—N/a		411.27	4
Patrick Hausding; Sascha Klein	10 m synchronized platform	433.50	2 Q	—N/a		461.46	1st place, gold medalist(s)

Women

Athlete	Event	Preliminaries		Semifinals		Final	
Athlete	Event	Points	Rank	Points	Rank	Points	Rank
Tina Punzel	1 m springboard	260.60	7 Q	—N/a		264.50	6
Tina Punzel	3 m springboard	271.55	16 Q	290.75			
Maria Kurjo	294.05	15 Q	317.60	5 Q	336.55	5	
Felicitas Lenz; Tina Punzel	3 m synchronized springboard	250.80	13	—N/a		Did not advance	
Maria Kurjo; Julia Stolle	10 m synchronized platform	270.72	10 Q	—N/a		253.08	12

== High diving ==
One athlete has qualified.

Athlete	Event	Points	Rank
Anna Bader	Women's high diving	203.90	3rd place, bronze medalist(s)

== Open water swimming ==
Germany qualified seven athletes.

Men

Athlete	Event	Time	Rank
Thomas Lurz	5 km	53:32.2	3rd place, bronze medalist(s)
Thomas Lurz	10 km	1:49:14.5	2nd place, silver medalist(s)
Thomas Lurz	25 km	4:47:27.0	1st place, gold medalist(s)
Rob Muffels	5 km	53.38.5	11
Christian Reichert	10 km	1:49:26.8	9
Christian Reichert	25 km	DNF	

Women

Athlete	Event	Time	Rank
Isabelle Härle	5 km	56:46.2	5
Angela Maurer	10 km	1:58:20.2	3rd place, bronze medalist(s)
Angela Maurer	25 km	5:07:19.8	2nd place, silver medalist(s)
Finnia Wunram	5 km	DSQ	
Svenja Zihsler	10 km	1:58:25.8	15
Svenja Zihsler	25 km	DNF	

Mixed

Athlete	Event	Time	Rank
Thomas Lurz; Christian Reichert; Isabelle Härle	Team	52:54.9	1st place, gold medalist(s)

== Swimming ==
Germany nominated 28 athletes to participate.

Men

Athlete	Event	Heat		Semifinal		Final	
Athlete	Event	Time	Rank	Time	Rank	Time	Rank
Dimitri Colupaev	200 m freestyle	1:48.50	=19	Did not advance			
Markus Deibler	200 m individual medley	1:58.76	8 Q	1:58.53	9	Did not advance	
Steffen Deibler	50 m butterfly	23.50	14 Q	23.02	6 Q	23.28	6
Steffen Deibler	100 m butterfly	52.07	7 Q	51.65	7 Q	51.54	4
Marco di Carli	100 m freestyle	50.38	36	Did not advance			
Hendrik Feldwehr	50 m breaststroke	27.59	17	Did not advance			
Hendrik Feldwehr	100 m breaststroke	1:00.08	9 Q	1:00.05	10	Did not advance	
Christoph Fildebrandt	50 m freestyle	22.64	25	Did not advance			
Martin Grodzki	400 m freestyle	3:54.47	26	—N/a		Did not advance	
Martin Grodzki	800 m freestyle	8:00.36	20	—N/a		Did not advance	
Philip Heintz	100 m butterfly	52.52	16 Q	52.37	14	Did not advance	
Philip Heintz	200 m individual medley	2:02.23	28	Did not advance			
Marco Koch	200 m breaststroke	2:09.39	1 Q	2:08.61	2 Q	2:08.54	2nd place, silver medalist(s)
Yannick Lebherz	200 m backstroke	1:57.33	5 Q	1:57.71	11	Did not advance	
Yannick Lebherz	400 m individual medley	4:16.23	11	—N/a		Did not advance	
Sören Meißner	800 m freestyle	7:56.64	13	—N/a		Did not advance	
Sören Meißner	1500 m freestyle	15:23.33	22	—N/a		Did not advance	
Clemens Rapp	200 m freestyle	1:48.37	16 Q	1:47.51	12	Did not advance	
Christian vom Lehn	100 m breaststroke	1:01.38	28	Did not advance			
Christian vom Lehn	200 m breaststroke	2:11.45	13 Q	2:10.12	10	Did not advance	
Kevin Wedel	400 m individual medley	4:23.18	21	—N/a		Did not advance	
Felix Wolf	50 m backstroke	25.90	23	Did not advance			
Felix Wolf	100 m backstroke	55.88	27	Did not advance			
Steffen Deibler; Marco di Carli; Christoph Fildebrandt; Markus Deibler	4 × 100 m freestyle relay	3:14.70	7 Q	—N/a		3:13.77	6
Dimitri Colupaev; Clemens Rapp; Markus Deibler; Yannick Lebherz	4 × 200 m freestyle relay	7:11.06	6 Q	—N/a		7:10.07	6
Felix Wolf; Hendrik Feldwehr; Philip Heintz; Steffen Deibler; Dimitri Colupaev*	4 × 100 m medley relay	3:34.91	8 Q	—N/a		3:33.97	5

Women

Athlete	Event	Heat		Semifinal		Final	
Athlete	Event	Time	Rank	Time	Rank	Time	Rank
Leonie Beck	1500 m freestyle	16:17.12	12	—N/a		Did not advance	
Dorothea Brandt	50 m freestyle	24.78	5 Q	24.85	7 Q	24.81	8
Isabelle Härle	800 m freestyle	8:36.83	18	—N/a		Did not advance	
Franziska Hentke	200 m butterfly	2:08.51	9 Q	2:07.87	9	Did not advance	
Selina Hocke	50 m backstroke	29.50	33	Did not advance			
Selina Hocke	100 m backstroke	1:02.94	31	Did not advance			
Selina Hocke	200 m backstroke	2:14.10	24	Did not advance			
Sarah Köhler	400 m freestyle	4:16.13	23	—N/a		Did not advance	
Sarah Köhler	800 m freestyle	8:34.72	15	—N/a		Did not advance	
Sarah Köhler	1500 m freestyle	16:24.42	14	—N/a		Did not advance	
Theresa Michalak	200 m individual medley	2:14.73	19	Did not advance			
Caroline Ruhnau	50 m breaststroke	31.73	25	Did not advance			
Caroline Ruhnau	100 m breaststroke	1:08.62	22	Did not advance			
Caroline Ruhnau	200 m breaststroke	DNS		Did not advance			
Daniela Schreiber	50 m freestyle	26.24	37	Did not advance			
Daniela Schreiber	100 m freestyle	55.44	22	Did not advance			
Britta Steffen	100 m freestyle	53.93	4 Q	53.85	6 Q	53.75	6
Alexandra Wenk	200 m freestyle	2:01.60	28	Did not advance			
Alexandra Wenk	50 m butterfly	26.78	=16*	Did not advance			
Alexandra Wenk	200 m individual medley	2:14.90	21	Did not advance			
Dorothea Brandt; Daniela Schreiber; Britta Steffen; Alexandra Wenk	4 × 100 m freestyle relay	3:39.19	7 Q	—N/a		3:39.57	8
Lisa Graf; Caroline Ruhnau; Alexandra Wenk; Britta Steffen	4 × 100 m medley relay	4:01.30	8 Q	—N/a		4:01.81	8

== Synchronized swimming ==
Four athletes have been nominated.

Athlete	Event	Preliminaries		Final	
Athlete	Event	Points	Rank	Points	Rank
Kyra Felßner	Solo free routine	80.060	18	did not advance	
Kyra Felßner	Solo technical routine	79.100	16 Q	80.100	16
Inken Jeske; Edith Zeppenfeld	Duet free routine	77.770	18	did not advance	
Wiebke Jeske; Edith Zeppenfeld	Duet technical routine	77.600	18	did not advance	

== Water polo ==
=== Men's tournament ===
Team roster

- Erik Bukowski
- Dennis Eidner
- Maurice Jüngling
- Roger Kong
- Erik Miers
- Heiko Nossek
- Moritz Oeler
- Julian Real
- Till Rohe
- Moritz Schenkel
- Andreas Schlotterbeck
- Paul Schüler
- Marko Stamm

Group D

	Pld	W	D	L	GF	GA	GD	Pts
Italy	3	3	0	0	32	18	+14	6
Germany	3	2	0	1	26	26	0	4
Kazakhstan	3	1	0	2	21	25	−4	2
Romania	3	0	0	3	16	26	−10	0

22 July 2013; 20:10	Report	Germany	9–8	Kazakhstan	Piscines Bernat Picornell, Barcelona; Attendance: 800; Referees: Terepenka (CAN), Koganov (AZE)
22 July 2013; 20:10	Report	Score by quarters: 3–3, 3–0, 3–1, 0–4			Piscines Bernat Picornell, Barcelona; Attendance: 800; Referees: Terepenka (CAN), Koganov (AZE)
22 July 2013; 20:10	Report	Nossek 3	Goals	Ushakov 3	Piscines Bernat Picornell, Barcelona; Attendance: 800; Referees: Terepenka (CAN), Koganov (AZE)

24 July 2013; 18:50	Report	Italy	10–8	Germany	Piscines Bernat Picornell, Barcelona; Attendance: 600; Referees: Borrell (ESP), Terepenka (CAN)
24 July 2013; 18:50	Report	Score by quarters: 3–1, 3–1, 3–3, 1–3			Piscines Bernat Picornell, Barcelona; Attendance: 600; Referees: Borrell (ESP), Terepenka (CAN)
24 July 2013; 18:50	Report	three players 2	Goals	Real, Schlotterbeck 2	Piscines Bernat Picornell, Barcelona; Attendance: 600; Referees: Borrell (ESP), Terepenka (CAN)

26 July 2013; 13:30	Report	Germany	9–8	Romania	Piscines Bernat Picornell, Barcelona; Attendance: 800; Referees: Naumov (RUS), Littlejohn (GBR)
26 July 2013; 13:30	Report	Score by quarters: 4–3, 3–0, 1–2, 1–3			Piscines Bernat Picornell, Barcelona; Attendance: 800; Referees: Naumov (RUS), Littlejohn (GBR)
26 July 2013; 13:30	Report	Schüler, Eidner 3	Goals	three players 2	Piscines Bernat Picornell, Barcelona; Attendance: 800; Referees: Naumov (RUS), Littlejohn (GBR)

Round of 16

28 July 2013; 21:30	Report	Germany	4–8	Australia	Piscines Bernat Picornell, Barcelona; Attendance: 900; Referees: Borrell (ESP), Bianchi (ITA)
28 July 2013; 21:30	Report	Score by quarters: 0–2, 2–2, 0–1, 2–3			Piscines Bernat Picornell, Barcelona; Attendance: 900; Referees: Borrell (ESP), Bianchi (ITA)
28 July 2013; 21:30	Report	Nossek 2	Goals	three players 2	Piscines Bernat Picornell, Barcelona; Attendance: 900; Referees: Borrell (ESP), Bianchi (ITA)
