= Tunisia at the 2013 World Aquatics Championships =

- Flag of Tunisia
- FINA code: TUN
- National federation: Federation Tunisienne de Natation
- Website: ftnatation.com

in Barcelona, Spain
- Competitors: 7 in 2 sports
- Medals Ranked 18th: Gold 1 Silver 0 Bronze 1 Total 2

World Aquatics Championships appearances
- 1973; 1975; 1978; 1982; 1986; 1991; 1994; 1998; 2001; 2003; 2005; 2007; 2009; 2011; 2013; 2015; 2017; 2019; 2022; 2023; 2024

Tunisia competed at the 2013 World Aquatics Championships in Barcelona, Spain between 20 July and 4 August 2013.

== Medalists ==
| Medal | Name | Sport | Event | Date |
|---|---|---|---|---|
| Gold | Oussama Mellouli | Open water swimming | Men's 5 km | 20 July |
| Bronze | Oussama Mellouli | Open water swimming | Men's 10 km | 22 July |

== Open water swimming ==
Tunisia nominated five athletes (four men and one woman) to participate.

| Athlete | Event | Time | Rank |
|---|---|---|---|
| Badr Chebchoub | Men's 25 km | 5:33:07.2 | 31 |
| Oussama Mellouli | Men's 5 km | 53:30.4 | 1st place, gold medalist(s) |
| Oussama Mellouli | Men's 10 km | 1:49:19.2 | 3rd place, bronze medalist(s) |
| Zagrani Mohamed Amine | Men's 10 km | 2:03:03.3 | 53 |
| Seifeddine Sghaier | Men's 5 km | 57:10.1 | 41 |
| Maroua Mathlouthi | Women's 5 km | 59:51.8 | 30 |
| Seifeddine Sghaier; Badr Chebchoub; Maroua Mathlouthi | Mixed team | 59:19.4 | 18 |

== Swimming ==
Tunisian swimmers earned qualifying standards in the following events (up to a maximum of two swimmers in each event at the A-standard entry time, and one at the B-standard):

Men

| Athlete | Event | Heat | | Semifinal | | Final | |
| Athlete | Event | Time | Rank | Time | Rank | Time | Rank |
|---|---|---|---|---|---|---|---|
| Ahmed Mathlouthi | 200 m freestyle | 1:49.43 | 31 | did not advance | | | |
| Ahmed Mathlouthi | 400 m freestyle | 3:49.45 | 11 | — | | did not advance | |
| Oussama Mellouli | 800 m freestyle | 7:50.77 | 5 Q | — | | 7:52.79 | 8 |
| Oussama Mellouli | 1500 m freestyle | 15:07.89 | 11 | — | | did not advance | |
| Taki Mrabet | 200 m individual medley | 2:02.22 | 27 | did not advance | | | |
| Taki Mrabet | 400 m individual medley | 4:23.39 | 24 | — | | did not advance | |
