= Swimming at the 2013 World Aquatics Championships – Women's 1500 metre freestyle =

Women's 1500 metre freestyle at the 2013 World Aquatics Championships
- Venue: Palau Sant Jordi
- Dates: July 29, 2013 (heats); July 30, 2013 (final)
- Competitors: 23 from 20 nations
- Winning time: 15:36.53 WR

Medalists
gold medal	Katie Ledecky	United States
silver medal	Lotte Friis	Denmark
bronze medal	Lauren Boyle	New Zealand

Barcelona Palau San Jordi

The women's 1500 metre freestyle event in swimming at the 2013 World Aquatics Championships took place on 29–30 July at the Palau Sant Jordi in Barcelona, Spain.

== Records ==
Prior to this competition, the existing world and championship records were:

World record	Kate Ziegler (USA)	15:42.54	Mission Viejo, California	17 June 2007
Competition record	Alessia Filippi (ITA)	15:44.93	Rome, Italy	28 July 2009

The following new records were set during this competition.

Date	Event	Name	Nationality	Time	Record
30 July	Final	Katie Ledecky	United States	15:36.53	WR

== Results ==
=== Heats ===
The Heats were held at 11:12.

Rank	Heat	Lane	Name	Nationality	Time	Notes
1	1	4	Lotte Friis	Denmark	15:49.18	Q
2	3	4	Katie Ledecky	United States	15:49.26	Q
3	1	5	Kristel Köbrich	Chile	15:54.30	Q, NR
4	3	3	Mireia Belmonte	Spain	16:00.31	Q
5	2	6	Boglárka Kapás	Hungary	16:02.58	Q, NR
6	1	6	Lauren Boyle	New Zealand	16:02.90	Q
7	2	5	Chloe Sutton	United States	16:04.72	Q
8	3	5	Xu Danlu	China	16:05.59	Q
9	2	4	Jazmin Carlin	Great Britain	16:06.46	
10	2	3	Martina Caramignoli	Italy	16:15.65	
11	1	7	Andreina Pinto	Venezuela	16:15.99	
12	1	3	Leonie Beck	Germany	16:17.12	
13	2	2	Chelsea Gubecka	Australia	16:21.82	
14	3	6	Sarah Köhler	Germany	16:24.42	
15	3	2	Erika Villaécija	Spain	16:25.07	
16	1	2	Julia Hassler	Liechtenstein	16:33.61	
17	3	7	Tjasa Oder	Slovenia	16:35.96	
18	2	7	Susana Escobar	Mexico	16:39.24	
19	2	1	Virginia Bardach	Argentina	16:47.59	
20	3	1	Han Na-Kyeong	South Korea	16:55.46	
21	3	8	Valerie Gruest	Guatemala	17.14.19	
22	1	1	Lani Cabrera	Barbados	17:38.41	
23	2	8	Daniele Miyahara	Peru	17:56.85	

=== Final ===
The final was held at 18:36.

Rank	Lane	Name	Nationality	Time	Notes
1st place, gold medalist(s)	5	Katie Ledecky	United States	15:36.53	WR
2nd place, silver medalist(s)	4	Lotte Friis	Denmark	15:38.88	ER
3rd place, bronze medalist(s)	7	Lauren Boyle	New Zealand	15:44.71	OC
4	6	Mireia Belmonte	Spain	15:58.83	NR
5	8	Xu Danlu	China	16:00.44	
6	3	Kristel Köbrich	Chile	16:01.94	
7	2	Boglárka Kapás	Hungary	16:06.89	
8	1	Chloe Sutton	United States	16:09.65	
