= Yekaterina Glushkova =

Kazakhstani water polo player

Personal information
- Born: 11 June 1981 (age 45) Kazakh SSR, Soviet Union

Sport
- Sport: water polo
Medal record
Representing Kazakhstan
Asian Games
Silver medal – second place	2010 Guangzhou	Team competition
- Updated on 19 August 2015

Yekaterina Glushkova (Екатерина Айдаровна Глушкова, née Gariyeva, born 11 June 1981) is a former water polo player of Kazakhstan.

She was part of the Kazakhstani team at the 2013 World Aquatics Championships in Barcelona, Spain.

== See also ==
- Kazakhstan at the 2013 World Aquatics Championships
