= Swimming at the 2013 World Aquatics Championships – Women's 800 metre freestyle =

Women's 800 metre freestyle at the 2013 World Aquatics Championships
- Venue: Palau Sant Jordi
- Dates: August 2, 2013 (heats); August 3, 2013 (final)
- Competitors: 38 from 32 nations
- Winning time: 8:13.86 WR

Medalists
gold medal	Katie Ledecky	United States
silver medal	Lotte Friis	Denmark
bronze medal	Lauren Boyle	New Zealand

Barcelona Palau San Jordi

The women's 800 metre freestyle event in swimming at the 2013 World Aquatics Championships took place on 2–3 August at the Palau Sant Jordi in Barcelona, Spain.

== Records ==
Prior to this competition, the existing world and championship records were:

World record	Rebecca Adlington (GBR)	8:14.10	Beijing, China	16 August 2008
Competition record	Lotte Friis (DEN)	8:15.92	Rome, Italy	1 August 2009

The following new records were set during this competition.

Date	Event	Name	Nationality	Time	Record
3 August	Final	Katie Ledecky	United States	8:13.86	WR

== Results ==
=== Heats ===
The heats were held on 2 August.

Rank	Heat	Lane	Name	Nationality	Time	Notes
1	4	4	Katie Ledecky	United States	8:20.65	Q
2	2	5	Lauren Boyle	New Zealand	8:21.00	Q, OC
3	4	5	Lotte Friis	Denmark	8:23.00	Q
4	2	4	Mireia Belmonte	Spain	8:25.03	Q
5	3	3	Boglárka Kapás	Hungary	8:25.26	Q
6	3	7	Martina de Memme	Italy	8:26.95	Q
7	3	6	Andreina Pinto	Venezuela	8:27.03	Q
8	4	3	Chloe Sutton	United States	8:27.41	Q
9	3	4	Jazmin Carlin	Great Britain	8:27.48	
10	2	3	Jessica Ashwood	Australia	8:27.74	
11	2	2	Kristel Köbrich	Chile	8:29.32	
12	4	2	Shao Yiwen	China	8:29.71	
13	3	2	Alexa Komarnycky	Canada	8:29.87	
14	3	5	Xu Danlu	China	8:29.98	
15	3	1	Sarah Köhler	Germany	8:34.72	
16	3	0	Samantha Arevalo	Ecuador	8:35.99	NR
17	4	6	Eleanor Faulkner	Great Britain	8:36.04	
18	4	1	Isabelle Härle	Germany	8:36.83	
19	2	6	Beatriz Gómez Cortes	Spain	8:37.26	
20	4	7	Savannah King	Canada	8:40.35	
21	2	1	Julia Hassler	Liechtenstein	8:40.89	
22	4	0	Susana Escobar	Mexico	8:42.84	
23	2	8	Tjasa Oder	Slovenia	8:42.96	
24	4	8	Katya Bachrouche	Lebanon	8:50.08	
25	3	9	Khoo Cai Lin	Malaysia	8:51.87	
26	3	8	Carolina Bilich	Brazil	8:52.10	
27	4	9	Virginia Bardach	Argentina	8:52.79	
28	2	0	Kyna Pereira	South Africa	8:54.10	
29	2	9	Andrea Basaraba	Serbia	8:58.04	
30	1	6	Valerie Gruest	Guatemala	8:59.70	
31	1	4	Benjaporn Sriphanomithorn	Thailand	9:05.32	
32	1	3	Lani Cabrera	Barbados	9:08.84	
33	1	5	Raina Ramdhani	Indonesia	9:10.75	
34	1	2	Daniela Miyahara	Peru	9:15.94	
35	1	7	Daniela Benavides	Cuba	9:38.20	
36	1	8	San Khant Khant Su	Myanmar	10:03.20	
37	1	1	Monica Saili	Samoa	10:11.46	
38	1	0	Victoria Chentsova	Northern Mariana Islands	10:14.63	
	2	7	Camille Muffat	France		DNS

=== Final ===
The final was held at 19:26.

Rank	Lane	Name	Nationality	Time	Notes
1st place, gold medalist(s)	4	Katie Ledecky	United States	8:13.86	WR
2nd place, silver medalist(s)	3	Lotte Friis	Denmark	8:16.32	
3rd place, bronze medalist(s)	5	Lauren Boyle	New Zealand	8:18.58	OC
4	2	Boglárka Kapás	Hungary	8:21.21	NR
5	6	Mireia Belmonte	Spain	8:21.99	
6	8	Chloe Sutton	United States	8:27.75	
7	1	Andreina Pinto	Venezuela	8:29.37	
8	7	Martina de Memme	Italy	8:37.29	
