= Diving at the 2013 World Aquatics Championships – Men's 1 metre springboard =

Men's 1 metre springboard at the 2013 World Aquatics Championships
- Dates: 20–22 July
- Competitors: 43 from 29 nations
- Winning points: 460.95

Medalists
gold medal	Li Shixin	China
silver medal	Illya Kvasha	Ukraine
bronze medal	Kevin Chavez	Mexico

The men's 1 metre springboard competition at 2013 World Aquatics Championships was held on July 20 with the preliminary round in the afternoon and the final on July 22 in the afternoon session.

== Results ==
The preliminary round was held on July 20 at 14:00 and the final on July 22 at 14:00 local time.

Green denotes finalists

Rank	Diver	Nationality	Preliminary		Final	
Rank	Diver	Nationality	Points	Rank	Points	Rank
1st place, gold medalist(s)	Li Shixin	China	405.00	1	460.95	1
2nd place, silver medalist(s)	Illya Kvasha	Ukraine	391.95	3	434.30	2
3rd place, bronze medalist(s)	Kevin Chavez	Mexico	381.20	4	431.55	3
4	Sun Zhiyi	China	377.15	7	425.05	4
5	Constantin Blaha	Austria	358.60	10	411.75	5
6	Matthieu Rosset	France	404.95	2	409.45	6
7	Rommel Pacheco	Mexico	378.90	6	399.65	7
8	Martin Wolfram	Germany	361.50	9	398.05	8
9	Sebastián Morales	Colombia	380.45	5	387.30	9
10	Oliver Homuth	Germany	362.20	8	386.75	10
11	Sergey Nazin	Russia	352.65	11	380.00	11
12	Oleg Kolodiy	Ukraine	349.75	12	375.75	12
13	Evgeny Novoselov	Russia	344.10	13		
14	Harry Jones	United States	343.40	14		
15	Andrzej Rzeszutek	Poland	338.45	15		
16	Christopher Mears	Great Britain	333.30	16		
17	Kristian Ipsen	United States	333.10	17		
18	Michail Fafalis	Greece	329.60	18		
19	Jack Laugher	Great Britain	327.20	19		
20	Xie Zhen	Hong Kong	321.95	20		
21	Woo Ha-Ram	South Korea	315.75	21		
22	Nicolás García	Spain	312.90	22		
23	Yona Knight-Wisdom	Jamaica	311.55	23		
24	Ahmad Amsyar Azman	Malaysia	309.15	24		
25	Espen Gilje Bergslien	Norway	306.50	25		
26	Michele Benedetti	Italy	303.10	26		
27	François Imbeau-Dulac	Canada	299.00	27		
28	Chew Yi Wei	Malaysia	297.00	28		
29	Vinko Paradzik	Sweden	295.10	29		
30	César Castro	Brazil	292.85	30		
31	Andreas Billi	Italy	292.30	31		
32	Yorick de Bruijn	Netherlands	289.40	32		
33	Alfredo Colmenarez	Venezuela	288.25	33		
34	Jesus Liranzo	Venezuela	285.15	34		
35	Poon Jason Wai Ching	Hong Kong	282.30	35		
36	Kim Yeong-Nam	South Korea	276.95	36		
37	Botond Bóta	Hungary	272.70	37		
38	Abbas Abdulrahman	Kuwait	270.25	38		
39	Yauheni Karaliou	Belarus	247.70	39		
40	Sergej Baziuk	Lithuania	246.30	40		
41	Addy van der Sluys	South Africa	239.15	41		
42	Jesper Tolvers	Sweden	229.00	42		
43	Ignas Barkauskas	Lithuania	212.90	43		
