= Chile at the 2013 World Aquatics Championships =

- Flag of Chile
- FINA code: CHI
- National federation: Federación Chilena de Deportes Acuáticos
- Website: www.fechida.cl

in Barcelona, Spain
- Competitors: 4 in 2 sports
- Medals: Gold 0 Silver 0 Bronze 0 Total 0

World Aquatics Championships appearances
- 1973; 1975; 1978; 1982; 1986; 1991; 1994; 1998; 2001; 2003; 2005; 2007; 2009; 2011; 2013; 2015; 2017; 2019; 2022; 2023; 2024

Chile is competing at the 2013 World Aquatics Championships in Barcelona, Spain between 19 July and 4 August 2013.

== Open water swimming ==
Chile qualified two quota places for the following events in open water swimming.

Athlete	Event	Time	Rank
Vicente Vidal	Men's 5 km	1:00:02.1	45
Vicente Vidal	Men's 10 km	2:05:14.7	57
Mahina Valdivia	Women's 5 km	1:05:19.6	38
Mahina Valdivia	Women's 10 km	2:13:54.9	45

== Swimming ==
Chilean swimmers achieved qualifying standards in the following events (up to a maximum of 2 swimmers in each event at the A-standard entry time, and 1 at the B-standard):

Men

Athlete	Event	Heat		Semifinal		Final	
Athlete	Event	Time	Rank	Time	Rank	Time	Rank
Oliver Elliot	50 m freestyle	22.90	=35	did not advance			

Women

Athlete	Event	Heat		Final	
Athlete	Event	Time	Rank	Time	Rank
Kristel Köbrich	800 m freestyle	8:29.32	11	did not advance	
Kristel Köbrich	1500 m freestyle	15:54.30	3 Q	16:01.94	6
