= Diving at the 2013 World Aquatics Championships – Men's synchronized 3 metre springboard =

Men's synchronized 3 metre springboard at the 2013 World Aquatics Championships
- Dates: 23 July
- Competitors: 38 from 19 nations
- Winning points: 448.86

Medalists
gold medal	Qin Kai; He Chong	China
silver medal	Ilya Zakharov; Evgeny Kuznetsov	Russia
bronze medal	Rommel Pacheco; Jahir Ocampo	Mexico

The men's synchronized 3 metre springboard competition at 2013 World Aquatics Championships was held on July 23 with the preliminary round in the morning and the final in the evening session.

== Results ==
The preliminary round was held at 10:00 and the final at 17:30.

Green denotes finalists

Rank	Diver	Nationality	Preliminary		Final	
Rank	Diver	Nationality	Points	Rank	Points	Rank
1st place, gold medalist(s)	Qin Kai; He Chong	China	454.32	1	448.86	1
2nd place, silver medalist(s)	Ilya Zakharov; Evgeny Kuznetsov	Russia	445.32	2	428.01	2
3rd place, bronze medalist(s)	Rommel Pacheco; Jahir Ocampo	Mexico	404.97	6	422.79	3
4	Patrick Hausding; Stephan Feck	Germany	427.68	3	411.27	4
5	Troy Dumais; Michael Hixon	United States	406.98	5	410.85	5
6	Ooi Tze Liang; Ahmad Amsyar Azman	Malaysia	382.77	8	404.61	6
7	Illya Kvasha; Oleksiy Pryhorov	Ukraine	420.81	4	403.65	7
8	Nicholas Robinson-Baker; Christopher Mears	Great Britain	388.92	7	391.53	8
9	René Hernández; Jorge Luis Pupo	Cuba	366.99	12	381.72	9
10	Kim Yeong-Nam; Woo Ha-Ram	South Korea	378.24	10	377.34	10
11	Stefanos Paparounas; Michail Fafalis	Greece	382.77	8	376.02	11
12	Giovanni Tocci; Andreas Billi	Italy	372.96	11	362.88	12
13	Alfredo Colmenarez; Jesus Liranzo	Venezuela	360.03	13		
14	Héctor García; Nicolás García	Spain	341.16	14		
15	Chow Ho Wing; Jason Poon	Hong Kong	326.46	15		
16	Frandiel Gomez; Argenis Alvarez	Dominican Republic	323.46	16		
17	Andryan Andryan; Akhmad Sukran Jamjami	Indonesia	313.26	17		
18	Ng Wai Hou; Leong Kam Cheong	Macau	299.70	18		
19	Dimitry Prosvirinin; Dmitriy Sorokin	Azerbaijan	294.66	19		
