= Chile at the 2023 World Aquatics Championships =

- Flag of Chile
- FINA code: CHI
- National federation: Chilean Federation of Aquatics Sport

in Fukuoka, Japan
- Competitors: 16 in 3 sports
- Medals: Gold 0 Silver 0 Bronze 0 Total 0

World Aquatics Championships appearances
- 1973; 1975; 1978; 1982; 1986; 1991; 1994; 1998; 2001; 2003; 2005; 2007; 2009; 2011; 2013; 2015; 2017; 2019; 2022; 2023; 2024

Chile competed at the 2023 World Aquatics Championships in Fukuoka, Japan from 14 to 30 July.

== Artistic swimming ==
Chile entered 10 artistic swimmers.

Women

Athlete	Event	Preliminaries		Final	
Athlete	Event	Points	Rank	Points	Rank
Antonia Mella	Solo technical routine	174.3566	17	Did not advance	
Isidora Letelier; Rocío Vargas	Duet technical routine	172.4133	28	Did not advance	

Mixed

Athlete	Event	Preliminaries		Final	
Athlete	Event	Points	Rank	Points	Rank
Nicolás Campos; Theodora Garrido	Duet free routine	125.3354	12 Q	119.1291	12
Nicolás Campos; Theodora Garrido	Duet technical routine	177.4817	8 Q	200.4767	8
Nicolás Campos; Soledad García; Trinidad García; Theodora Garrido; Isidora Letelier; Antonia Mella; Josefa Morales; Rocío Vargas	Team technical routine	176.9279	18	Did not advance	
Barbara Coppelli; Theodora Garrido; Soledad García; Trinidad García; Isidora Letelier; Antonia Mella; Josefa Morales; Rocío Vargas	Team free routine	182.3626	14	Did not advance	
Soledad García; Trinidad García; Theodora Garrido; Isidora Letelier; Josefa Morales; Antonia Mella; Fiona Prieto; Rocío Vargas	Team acrobatic routine	154.2067	16	Did not advance	

== Diving ==
Chile entered 2 divers.

Men

Athlete	Event	Preliminaries		Semifinals		Final	
Athlete	Event	Points	Rank	Points	Rank	Points	Rank
Diego Carquín	1 m springboard	224.80	59	—		Did not advance	
Diego Carquín	3 m springboard	278.35	54	Did not advance			
Donato Neglia	1 m springboard	283.85	41	—		Did not advance	
Donato Neglia	3 m springboard	274.35	59	Did not advance			

== Swimming ==
Chile entered 4 swimmers.

Men

Athlete	Event	Heat		Semifinal		Final	
Athlete	Event	Time	Rank	Time	Rank	Time	Rank
Eduardo Cisternas	400 metre freestyle	3:53.80	29	—		Did not advance	
Eduardo Cisternas	800 metre freestyle	8:18.06	35	—		Did not advance	
Mariano Lazzerini	50 metre breaststroke	28.44	33	Did not advance			
Mariano Lazzerini	100 metre breaststroke	1:01.97	36	Did not advance			

Women

Athlete	Event	Heat		Semifinal		Final	
Athlete	Event	Time	Rank	Time	Rank	Time	Rank
Kristel Köbrich	800 metre freestyle	8:37.09	19	—		Did not advance	
Kristel Köbrich	1500 metre freestyle	16:11.25	10	—		Did not advance	
Inés Marín	100 metre freestyle	56.90 NR	33	Did not advance			
Inés Marín	200 metre freestyle	2:02.20	37	Did not advance			
