= Argentina at the 2013 World Aquatics Championships =

- Flag of Argentina
- World Aquatics code: ARG
- National federation: Confederación Argentina de Deportes Acuáticos
- Website: www.cadda.org.ar

in Barcelona, Spain
- Competitors: 10 in 3 sports
- Medals: Gold 0 Silver 0 Bronze 0 Total 0

World Aquatics Championships appearances
- 1973; 1975; 1978; 1982; 1986; 1991; 1994; 1998; 2001; 2003; 2005; 2007; 2009; 2011; 2013; 2015; 2017; 2019; 2022; 2023; 2024; 2025

Argentina competed at the 2013 World Aquatics Championships in Barcelona, Spain from 19 July to 4 August.

== Open water swimming ==
The following open water swimmers qualified from Argentina:

Men

Athlete	Event	Time	Rank
Guillermo Bertola	Men's 10 km	1:49:28.4	10
Guillermo Bertola	Men's 25 km	4:47:44.8	8
Martín Carrizo	Men's 10 km	1:50:18.4	28
Martín Carrizo	Men's 25 km	5:01:43.1	25
Julia Lucila Arino	Women's 10 km	2:02:37.8	36
Julia Lucila Arino	Women's 25 km	5:22:47.0	15
Florencia Mazzei	Women's 5 km	57:49.0	26
Florencia Mazzei	Women's 10 km	1:58:43.9	27
Guillermo Bertola; Martín Carizzo; Florencia Mazzei	Mixed team	58:12.0	15

== Swimming ==
Argentine swimmers achieved qualifying standards in the following events (up to a maximum of 2 swimmers in each event at the A-standard entry time, and 1 at the B-standard):

Men

Athlete	Event	Heat		Semifinal		Final	
Athlete	Event	Time	Rank	Time	Rank	Time	Rank
Federico Grabich	50 m freestyle	23.00	40	did not advance			
Federico Grabich	50 m backstroke	25.44	15 Q	25.16 NR	10	did not advance	
Federico Grabich	100 m freestyle	49.87	30	did not advance			
Federico Grabich	100 m backstroke	55.03	20	did not advance			
Martín Naidich	400 m freestyle	3:58.92	36	—N/a		did not advance	
Martín Naidich	800 m freestyle	8:20.53	31	—N/a		did not advance	
Martín Naidich	1500 m freestyle	15:56.17	34	—N/a		did not advance	

Women

Athlete	Event	Heat		Semifinal		Final	
Athlete	Event	Time	Rank	Time	Rank	Time	Rank
Virginia Bardach	800 m freestyle	8:52.79	27	—N/a		did not advance	
Virginia Bardach	1500 m freestyle	16:47.59	19	—N/a		did not advance	
Julia Sebastián	50 m breaststroke	32.28	32	did not advance			
Julia Sebastián	100 m breaststroke	1:10.56	33	did not advance			
Julia Sebastián	200 m breaststroke	2:32.88	26	did not advance			

== Synchronized swimming ==
Argentina qualified the following synchronized swimmers.

Athlete	Event	Preliminaries		Final	
Athlete	Event	Points	Rank	Points	Rank
Etel Sánchez	Solo free routine	78.460	19	did not advance	
Etel Sánchez	Solo technical routine	78.900	17	did not advance	
Etel Sánchez; Sofía Sánchez	Duet free routine	79.990	17	did not advance	
Etel Sánchez; Sofía Sánchez	Duet technical routine	79.300	15 Q	79.800	15
