= Synchronised swimming at the 2013 World Aquatics Championships – Duet free routine =

Duet free routine at the Synchronised swimming at the 2013 World Aquatics Championships
- Dates: 23 July (preliminaries); 25 July (final)
- Competitors: 74 from 37 nations
- Winning points: 97.680

Medalists
| gold medal | Svetlana Kolesnichenko; Svetlana Romashina | Russia |
| silver medal | Jiang Tingting; Jiang Wenwen | China |
| bronze medal | Ona Carbonell; Margalida Crespí | Spain |

Barcelona Palau San Jordi

The duet free routine competition at 2013 World Aquatics Championships was held on July 23 with the preliminary round and the final on July 25.

== Results ==
The preliminary round was held on 23 July at 09:00 and the final on 25 July at 19:00.

Green denotes finalists

| Rank | Diver | Nationality | Preliminary | | Final | |
| Rank | Diver | Nationality | Points | Rank | Points | Rank |
|---|---|---|---|---|---|---|
| 1st place, gold medalist(s) | Svetlana Kolesnichenko; Svetlana Romashina | Russia | 97.230 | 1 | 97.680 | 1 |
| 2nd place, silver medalist(s) | Jiang Tingting; Jiang Wenwen | China | 95.080 | 2 | 95.350 | 2 |
| 3rd place, bronze medalist(s) | Ona Carbonell; Margalida Crespí | Spain | 94.270 | 3 | 94.990 | 3 |
| 4 | Lolita Ananasova; Anna Voloshyna | Ukraine | 92.530 | 4 | 92.620 | 4 |
| 5 | Yumi Adachi; Yukiko Inui | Japan | 91.470 | 5 | 91.620 | 5 |
| 6 | Linda Cerruti; Costanza Ferro | Italy | 89.630 | 6 | 89.170 | 6 |
| 7 | Evangelia Platanioti; Despoina Solomou | Greece | 88.010 | 8 | 87.980 | 7 |
| 8 | Emilia Kopcik; Stéphanie Leclair | Canada | 88.620 | 7 | 87.370 | 8 |
| 9 | Olivia Allison; Jenna Randall | Great Britain | 87.680 | 9 | 87.180 | 9 |
| 10 | Laura Augé; Margaux Chrétien | France | 87.280 | 10 | 86.620 | 10 |
| 11 | Kim Jong-Hui; Ri Ji-Hyang | North Korea | 85.840 | 11 | 85.780 | 11 |
| 12 | Pamela Fischer; Anja Nyffeler | Switzerland | 83.370 | 12 | 83.030 | 12 |
| 13 | Soňa Bernardová; Alžběta Dufková | Czech Republic | 83.100 | 13 | | |
| 14 | Isabel Delgado; Nuria Diosdado | Mexico | 83.040 | 14 | | |
| 15 | Lorena Molinos; Giovana Stephan | Brazil | 81.830 | 15 | | |
| 16 | Alexandra Nemich; Yekaterina Nemich | Kazakhstan | 80.110 | 16 | | |
| 17 | Etel Sánchez; Sofía Sánchez | Argentina | 79.990 | 17 | | |
| 18 | Inken Jeske; Edith Zeppenfeld | Germany | 77.770 | 18 | | |
| 19 | Estefanía Álvarez; Mónica Arango | Colombia | 77.430 | 19 | | |
| 20 | Iryna Limanouskaya; Iya Zhyshkevich | Belarus | 76.940 | 20 | | |
| 21 | Kristína Krajčovičová; Jana Labáthová | Slovakia | 76.350 | 21 | | |
| 22 | Jomana Mohamed; Aya Darwish | Egypt | 74.990 | 22 | | |
| 23 | Jung Young-Hee; Kong Do-Yeon | South Korea | 72.580 | 23 | | |
| 24 | Anouk Eman; Kyra Hoevertsz | Aruba | 72.260 | 24 | | |
| 25 | Rebecca Domika; Tina Panić | Croatia | 71.860 | 25 | | |
| 26 | Albany Avila; Karla Loaiza | Venezuela | 71.470 | 26 | | |
| 27 | Maria Kirkova; Kalina Yordanova | Bulgaria | 71.430 | 27 | | |
| 28 | Yuliya Kim; Anastasiya Ruzmetova | Uzbekistan | 71.250 | 28 | | |
| 29 | Caitlin Anderson; Kirstin Anderson | New Zealand | 70.460 | 29 | | |
| 30 | Olia Burtaev; Bianca Hammett | Australia | 70.180 | 30 | | |
| 31 | Mei Qi Stephanie Chen; Yu Hui Crystal Yap | Singapore | 69.330 | 31 | | |
| 32 | Tanja Bogdanović; Ana Cekić | Serbia | 68.550 | 32 | | |
| 33 | Bianca Benavides; Violete Mitinian | Costa Rica | 67.230 | 33 | | |
| 34 | Au Ieong Sin Ieng; Lo Wai Lam | Macau | 65.410 | 34 | | |
| 35 | Jennifer Quintana; Odailys Suarez | Cuba | 64.430 | 35 | | |
| 36 | Emma Manners-Wood; Laura Strugnell | South Africa | 62.550 | 36 | | |
| 37 | Aphichaya Saengrusamee; Arpapat Saengrusamee | Thailand | 56.090 | 37 | | |
