= Cuba at the 2013 World Aquatics Championships =

- Flag of Cuba
- FINA code: CUB
- National federation: Federación Cubaña de Natación

in Barcelona, Spain
- Competitors: 14 in 3 sports
- Medals: Gold 0 Silver 0 Bronze 0 Total 0

World Aquatics Championships appearances
- 1973; 1975; 1978; 1982; 1986; 1991; 1994; 1998; 2001; 2003; 2005; 2007; 2009; 2011; 2013; 2015; 2017; 2019; 2022; 2023; 2024

Cuba is competing at the 2013 World Aquatics Championships in Barcelona, Spain between 19 July and 4 August 2013.

== Diving ==
Cuba qualified seven quota places for the following diving events.

Men

Athlete	Event	Preliminaries		Semifinals		Final	
Athlete	Event	Points	Rank	Points	Rank	Points	Rank
Rene Hernández	3 m springboard	364.30	26	did not advance			
Jorge Luis Pupo	3 m springboard	321.40	39	did not advance			
Jeinkler Aguirre	10 m platform	416.10	11 Q	452.15	8 Q	417.30	10
Yumandy Paz	10 m platform	305.05	29	did not advance			
Rene Hernández; Jorge Luis Pupo	3 m synchronized springboard	366.99	12 Q	—		381.72	9
Jeinkler Aguirre; José Guerra	10 m synchronized platform	403.68	6 Q	—		434.49	5

Women

Athlete	Event	Preliminaries		Semifinals		Final	
Athlete	Event	Points	Rank	Points	Rank	Points	Rank
Danay Brizuela	3 m springboard	168.50	42	did not advance			
Annia Rivera	10 m platform	217.20	34	did not advance			

== Swimming ==
Cuban swimmers achieved qualifying standards in the following events (up to a maximum of 2 swimmers in each event at the A-standard entry time, and 1 at the B-standard):

Men

Athlete	Event	Heat		Semifinal		Final	
Athlete	Event	Time	Rank	Time	Rank	Time	Rank
Hanser García	50 m freestyle	22.78	=29	did not advance			
Hanser García	100 m freestyle	48.54	5 Q	48.54	11	did not advance	
Pedro Medel	100 m backstroke	56.12	29	did not advance			
Pedro Medel	200 m backstroke	2:03.63	27	did not advance			

Women

Athlete	Event	Heat		Semifinal		Final	
Athlete	Event	Time	Rank	Time	Rank	Time	Rank
Daniela Benavides	400 m freestyle	4:35.85	33	—		did not advance	
Daniela Benavides	800 m freestyle	9:38.20	35	—		did not advance	
Elisbet Gamez	100 m freestyle	57.66	42	did not advance			
Elisbet Gamez	200 m freestyle	2:05.54	36	did not advance			

== Synchronized swimming ==
Cuba has qualified three synchronized swimmers.

Athlete	Event	Preliminaries		Final	
Athlete	Event	Points	Rank	Points	Rank
Cristy Alfonso	Solo free routine	65.260	31	did not advance	
Jennifer Quintana	Solo technical routine	62.600	=32	did not advance	
Cristy Alfonso; Odailys Suaréz	Duet free routine	61.100	32	did not advance	
Jennifer Quintana; Odailys Suaréz	Duet free routine	64.430	35	did not advance	
