= Samuel de Bona =

Brazilian swimmer (born 1990)

Personal information
- Full name: Samuel Menegon de Bona
- Nationality: Brazil
- Born: 1 October 1990 (age 35) Porto Alegre, Rio Grande do Sul, Brazil
- Height: 1.83 m (6 ft 0 in)
- Weight: 82 kg (181 lb)

Sport
- Sport: Swimming
- Strokes: Freestyle
Medal record
World Championships
Bronze medal – third place	2013 Barcelona	Team

Samuel Menegon de Bona (born 1 October 1990 in Porto Alegre) is a Brazilian swimmer, who specialized in the open water marathon. He trained at Grêmio Náutico União, in Porto Alegre.

In April 2011, he won, for the first time, the Travessia dos Fortes (the most important competition of the calendar of aquatic marathons in Brazil).

At the 2011 FINA World Championships in Shanghai, de Bona placed 36th in the 5 km marathon, with a time of 1:01:20.9, 44th in the 10 km marathon, with a time of 2:02:17.2, and 16th in the 25 km marathon, with a time of 5:27:38.1.

At the 2011 Pan American Games in Guadalajara, de Bona finished 12th in the 10 km Marathon Swimming.

At the 2013 World Aquatics Championships, in Barcelona, he finished 6th in the Men's 5 km race. Later, in the team event, he won the bronze medal with the Brazilian team, along with Allan do Carmo and Poliana Okimoto.

At the 2015 Pan American Games in Toronto, Canada, he abandoned the race of Men's marathon 10 kilometres, after suffering blows to the nose and feeling sick.

At the 2015 FINA World Championships in Kazan, he finished 14th in the 5 km marathon.

De Bona retired from sport, graduated in law and, in 2021, was invited and accepted to be a representative of the Brazilian Athletes Commission at the Anti-Doping Sports Court.
