= Assel Jakayeva =

Kazakhstani water polo player

Personal information
- Born: 14 March 1980 (age 46) Dzhambul, Kazakh SSR, Soviet Union

Sport
- Sport: water polo
Medal record
Representing Kazakhstan
Asian Games
Bronze medal – third place	2014 Incheon	Team competition
- Updated on 19 August 2015

Assel Jakayeva (Асель Шинполатовна Жакаева, born 14 March 1980) is a former Kazakhstan water polo player. She was part of the Kazakhstani team at the 2013 World Aquatics Championships in Barcelona, Spain, and competed at two Olympic Games.

At club level, she played for Greek team Olympiacos, with whom she reached the final of the LEN Trophy in 2008. She also played for Olympiacos in 2013, playing in the Greek Championship finals.

== See also ==
- Kazakhstan at the 2013 World Aquatics Championships
