= Vladimir Ushakov =

Kazakhstani water polo player

Personal information
- Born: 16 March 1982 (age 44) Zhdanov, Soviet Union

Sport
- Sport: Water polo
Medal record
Representing Kazakhstan
Asian Games
Gold medal – first place	2014 Incheon	Team competition

Vladimir Ushakov (born 16 March 1982) is a Kazakhstani water polo player. At the 2012 Summer Olympics, he competed for the Kazakhstan men's national water polo team in the men's event. He is 6 ft 5 inches tall.

As of 2021, Vladimir is the head coach of Surrey Water Polo, a high performance club that has acquired numerous medals from national competitions across Canada.
