= Victoria Muratore =

Brazilian water polo player

Personal information
- Born: 2 August 1994 (age 31) Brazil

Sport
- Sport: Water polo
Medal record
Representing Brazil

Victoria Muratore (born 2 August 1994) is a Brazilian water polo player.

She was part of the Brazilian team at the 2013 World Aquatics Championships,
