= Marina Gritsenko =

Kazakhstani water polo player

Personal information
- Born: 17 August 1980 (age 45) Kazakh SSR, Soviet Union
- Height: 1.70 m (5 ft 7 in)
- Weight: 61 kg (134 lb)

Sport
- Sport: water polo
- Updated on 19 August 2015

Marina Gritsenko (Марина Александровна Гриценко, born 17 August 1980) is a former water polo player of Kazakhstan.

She was part of the Kazakhstani team at the 2011 World Aquatics Championships, 2012 Summer Olympics. and 2013 World Aquatics Championships in Barcelona, Spain.

== See also ==
- Kazakhstan at the 2013 World Aquatics Championships
