= Philippe Guertin =

Canadian swimmer

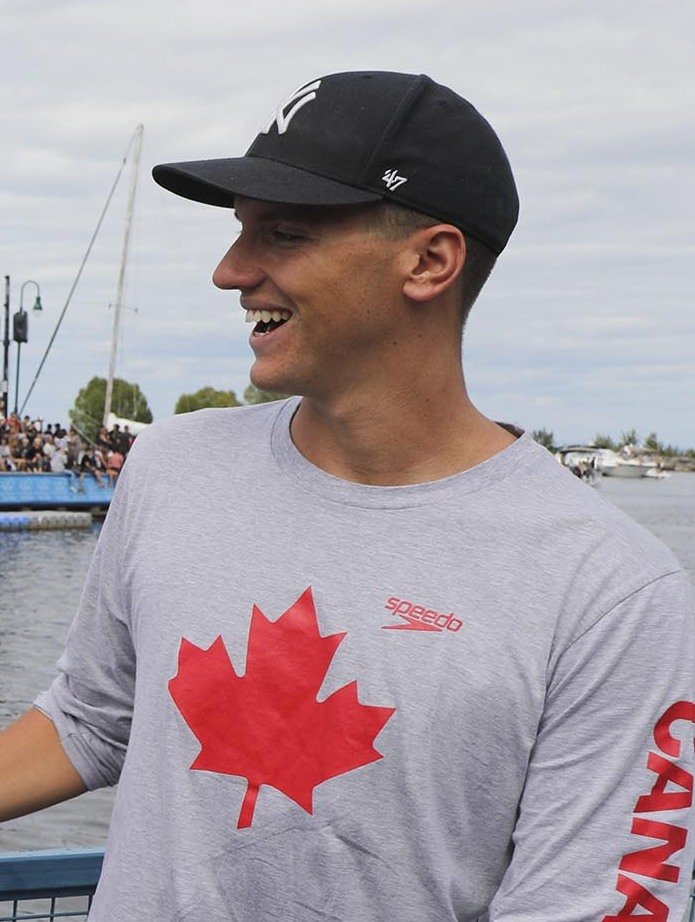

Personal information
- National team: Canada
- Born: January 18, 1991 (age 35) Saint John, New Brunswick, Canada
- Height: 1.84 m (6 ft 0 in)
- Weight: 72 kg (159 lb)

Sport
- Sport: Swimming
- Strokes: Freestyle
- Club: Club Aquatique Montréal

Philippe Guertin (born January 18, 1991) is a Canadian long-distance open water swimmer.

In April 2017, Guertin was named to Canada's 2017 World Aquatics Championships team in Budapest, Hungary.
