= Nataly Caldas =

Ecuadorian swimmer (born 1989)

Personal information
- Born: 26 October 1989 (age 36)

Sport
- Sport: Swimming
Medal record
South American Games
Bronze medal – third place	2018 Cochabamba	10 km open water
Bolivarian Games
Bronze medal – third place	2017 Santa Marta	5 km open water
Bolivarian Beach Games
Silver medal – second place	2016 Iquique	10 km open water

Nataly Caldas (born 26 October 1989) is an Ecuadorian swimmer. In 2019, she competed in the women's 5 km and women's 10 km events at the 2019 World Aquatics Championships held in Gwangju, South Korea. In the 5 km event she finished in 41st place and in the 10 km event she finished in 44th place.
