= Open water swimming at the 2013 World Aquatics Championships =

- Host city: Barcelona, Catalonia
- Events: 7

The Open water swimming portion of the 2013 World Aquatics Championships was held between July 20–27 in Barcelona, Spain, in Moll de la Fusta.

== Events ==
The following events were contested by both men and women in Barcelona:

- 5 km
- 10 km
- 25 km

In addition, there was a team competition with male and female competitors.

== Schedule ==
Date	Time	Event
20 July 2013	10:00	Women's 5 km
20 July 2013	13:00	Men's 5 km
22 July 2013	12:00	Men's 10 km
23 July 2013	12:00	Women's 10 km
25 July 2013	12:00	5 km team
27 July 2013	08:00	Men's 25 km
27 July 2013	08:15	Women's 25 km

== Medal summary ==
=== Medal table ===
Rank	Nation	Gold	Silver	Bronze	Total
1	Germany	2	2	2	6
2	Brazil	1	2	2	5
3	Greece	1	1	0	2
4	Tunisia	1	0	1	2
4	United States	1	0	1	2
6	Italy	1	0	0	1
7	Belgium	0	1	0	1
7	Canada	0	1	0	1
9	Russia	0	0	1	1
Totals (9 entries)		7	7	7	21

=== Men ===
Event	Gold		Silver		Bronze	
5 km	Oussama Mellouli; Tunisia	53:30.4	Eric Hedlin; Canada	53:31.6	Thomas Lurz; Germany	53:32.2
10 km	Spyridon Gianniotis; Greece	1:49:11.8	Thomas Lurz; Germany	1:49:14.5	Oussama Mellouli; Tunisia	1:49:19.2
25 km	Thomas Lurz; Germany	4:47:27.0*	Brian Ryckeman; Belgium	4:47:27.4	Evgeny Drattsev; Russia	4:47:28.1

- Record(*)

=== Women ===
Event	Gold		Silver		Bronze	
5 km	Haley Anderson; United States	56:34.2	Poliana Okimoto; Brazil	56:34.4	Ana Marcela Cunha; Brazil	56:44.7
10 km	Poliana Okimoto; Brazil	1:58:19.2	Ana Marcela Cunha; Brazil	1:58:19.5	Angela Maurer; Germany	1:58:20.2
25 km	Martina Grimaldi; Italy	5:07:19.7*	Angela Maurer; Germany	5:07:19.8	Eva Fabian; United States	5:07:20.4

- Record(*)

=== Team ===
Event	Gold		Silver		Bronze	
Team	Thomas Lurz; Christian Reichert; Isabelle Härle; Germany	52:54.9*	Antonios Fokaidis; Spyridon Gianniotis; Kalliopi Araouzou; Greece	54:03.3	Allan do Carmo; Samuel de Bona; Poliana Okimoto; Brazil	54:03.5

- Record(*)
