= 2013 World Aquatics Championships =

15th FINA World Championships

15th FINA World Championships
- Host city: Barcelona, Catalonia
- Date: 20 July–4 August 2013
- Venue: Palau Sant Jordi
- Nations: 181
- Athletes: 2293
- Opened by: Juan Carlos I of Spain
- Closed by: Julio Maglione

The 15th FINA World Championships (Catalan: Campionat Mundial de Natació de 2013, Spanish: Campeonato Mundial de Natación de 2013) were held from 20 July to 4 August in Barcelona, Catalonia, Spain. The 2013 World Championships featured 6 aquatics disciplines: swimming, water polo, diving, high diving, open water, and synchronised swimming.

The Championships were originally awarded to Dubai, United Arab Emirates, in July 2009; however, Dubai withdrew as host in May 2010. FINA then re-bid the meet, and Barcelona was selected on September 26, 2010.

== Venues ==
The venues that hosted the events were previously used for the 2003 World Aquatics Championships:

- Palau Sant Jordi (swimming, synchronized swimming)
- Port Vell (open water swimming, high diving)
- Piscina Municipal de Montjuïc (diving)
- Piscines Bernat Picornell (water polo)

== Schedule ==
This was the first time the World Aquatic Championships included high diving.

The opening ceremonies took place on July 19, 2013.

1	Number of finals
●	Other competitions

All dates are CEST (UTC+2)

July–August 2013	20 Sat	21 Sun	22 Mon	23 Tue	24 Wed	25 Thu	26 Fri	27 Sat	28 Sun	29 Mon	30 Tue	31 Wed	1 Thu	2 Fri	3 Sat	4 Sun	Gold medals
Diving	1	1	2	2	●	1	1	1	1								10
High diving										●	1	1					2
Open water swimming	2		1	1		1		2									7
Swimming									4	4	5	4	5	5	5	8	40
Synchronised swimming	1	1	1	●	1	1	1	1									7
Water polo		●	●	●	●	●	●	●	●	●	●	●	●	1	1		2
Total gold medals	4	2	4	3	1	3	2	4	5	4	6	5	5	6	6	8	68
Cumulative total	4	6	10	13	14	17	19	23	28	32	38	43	48	54	60	68	

== Medal table ==
* Host nation (Spain)

Rank	Nation	Gold	Silver	Bronze	Total
1	United States	15	10	9	34
2	China	14	8	4	26
3	Russia	9	6	4	19
4	France	4	1	4	9
5	Hungary	4	1	2	7
6	Australia	3	11	0	14
7	Germany	3	3	4	10
8	Brazil	3	2	5	10
9	South Africa	3	1	1	5
10	Spain*	1	6	5	12
11	Italy	1	3	1	5
12	Denmark	1	3	0	4
13	Japan	1	2	3	6
14	Greece	1	1	0	2
14	Lithuania	1	1	0	2
14	Sweden	1	1	0	2
17	Netherlands	1	0	3	4
18	Tunisia	1	0	1	2
19	Colombia	1	0	0	1
20	Canada	0	3	4	7
21	Poland	0	2	1	3
22	Ukraine	0	1	4	5
23	Great Britain	0	1	1	2
24	Belgium	0	1	0	1
24	Montenegro	0	1	0	1
26	Mexico	0	0	4	4
27	New Zealand	0	0	3	3
28	Croatia	0	0	1	1
28	Finland	0	0	1	1
28	Malaysia	0	0	1	1
28	Trinidad and Tobago	0	0	1	1
Totals (31 entries)		68	69	67	204

== Competition ==
=== Open water swimming ===
On the first day of competition on July 20, American Haley Anderson won the first gold of the competition in the women's 5 km, just beating Brazilian Poliana Okimoto 56:34.2 to 56:34.4. In the second event on day one, Tunisian Oussama Mellouli won the men's 5 km race with a time of 53:30.4.

=== Swimming ===
==== World records ====
The following world records were established during the competition:

Date	Event	Round	Time	Name	Nation
July 29, 2013	Women's 100 m breaststroke	Semifinals	1:04.35	Rūta Meilutytė	Lithuania
July 30, 2013	Women's 1500 metre freestyle	Final	15:36.53	Katie Ledecky	United States
August 1, 2013	Women's 200 m breaststroke	Semifinals	2:19.11	Rikke Møller Pedersen	Denmark
August 3, 2013	Women's 50 m breaststroke	Heats	29.78	Yuliya Yefimova	Russia
August 3, 2013	Women's 50 m breaststroke	Semifinals	29.48	Rūta Meilutytė	Lithuania
August 3, 2013	Women's 800 metre freestyle	Final	8:13.86	Katie Ledecky	United States

== Participating nations ==
181 nations entered the competition. Ecuador, currently suspended by FINA, participated under the FINA flag as independent athletes.

- Albania (4)
- Algeria (2)
- American Samoa (1)
- Andorra (3)
- Angola (4)
- Antigua and Barbuda (3)
- Argentina (10)
- Armenia (5)
- Aruba (5)
- Australia (83)
- Austria (7)
- Azerbaijan (6)
- Bahamas (4)
- Bahrain (4)
- Bangladesh (3)
- Barbados (2)
- Belarus (22)
- Belgium (11)
- Benin (3)
- Bermuda (2)
- Bolivia (5)
- Bosnia and Herzegovina (2)
- Botswana (3)
- Brazil (53)
- Brunei (4)
- Bulgaria (7)
- Burkina Faso (3)
- Burundi (3)
- Cambodia (3)
- Canada (85)
- Central African Republic (3)
- Chile (4)
- China (105)
- Chinese Taipei (5)
- Colombia (15)
- Comoros (2)
- Republic of the Congo (2)
- Democratic Republic of the Congo (4)
- Cook Islands (1)
- Costa Rica (18)
- Croatia (21)
- Cuba (16)
- Cyprus (3)
- Czech Republic (21)
- Denmark (4)
- Djibouti (3)
- Dominican Republic (6)
- Egypt (25)
- El Salvador (4)
- Estonia (3)
- Ethiopia (3)
- Faroe Islands (4)
- Federated States of Micronesia (3)
- Fiji (4)
- Ecuador (9)
- Finland (13)
- France (50)
- The Gambia (1)
- Georgia (4)
- Germany (61)
- Ghana (3)
- Great Britain (72)
- Greece (50)
- Grenada (3)
- Guam (3)
- Guatemala (5)
- Guinea (3)
- Guyana (3)
- Honduras (4)
- Hong Kong (17)
- Hungary (47)
- Iceland (4)
- India (5)
- Indonesia (15)
- Iran (2)
- Iraq (2)
- Ireland (4)
- Israel (10)
- Italy (103)
- Ivory Coast (3)
- Jamaica (3)
- Japan (51)
- Jordan (3)
- Kazakhstan (47)
- Kenya (3)
- North Korea (15)
- South Korea (29)
- Kuwait (4)
- Kyrgyzstan (4)
- Laos (3)
- Latvia (4)
- Lebanon (3)
- Lesotho (1)
- Libya (2)
- Liechtenstein (2)
- Lithuania (11)
- Luxembourg (5)
- Macau (21)
- Macedonia (3)
- Madagascar (4)
- Malaysia (15)
- Maldives (3)
- Mali (3)
- Malta (2)
- Marshall Islands (3)
- Mauritius (3)
- Mexico (47)
- Moldova (3)
- Monaco (1)
- Mongolia (4)
- Montenegro (13)
- Morocco (4)
- Mozambique (2)
- Myanmar (3)
- Namibia (3)
- Nepal (4)
- Netherlands (39)
- Netherlands Antilles (3)
- New Zealand (52)
- Nicaragua (3)
- Niger (6)
- Nigeria (3)
- Northern Mariana Islands (4)
- Norway (8)
- Pakistan (4)
- Palau (3)
- Palestine (4)
- Panama (3)
- Papua New Guinea (3)
- Paraguay (4)
- Peru (4)
- Philippines (3)
- Poland (20)
- Portugal (9)
- Puerto Rico (4)
- Qatar (6)
- Romania (19)
- Russia (82)
- Rwanda (4)
- Saint Lucia (5)
- Saint Vincent and the Grenadines (3)
- Samoa (3)
- Senegal (3)
- Serbia (24)
- Seychelles (3)
- Sierra Leone (2)
- Singapore (20)
- Slovakia (9)
- Slovenia (14)
- Somalia (1)
- South Africa (58)
- Spain (69) ( Host )
- Sri Lanka (4)
- Sudan (5)
- Suriname (4)
- Sweden (16)
- Switzerland (16)
- Syria (4)
- Tahiti (2)
- Tajikistan (3)
- Tanzania (3)
- Thailand (15)
- Togo (3)
- Tonga (3)
- Trinidad and Tobago (3)
- Tunisia (7)
- Turkey (21)
- Turkmenistan (4)
- Uganda (3)
- Ukraine (38)
- United Arab Emirates (2)
- United States (115)
- Virgin Islands (2)
- Uruguay (4)
- Uzbekistan (21)
- Venezuela (23)
- Vietnam (3)
- Yemen (2)
- Zambia (3)
- Zimbabwe (3)
