= Diving at the 2013 World Aquatics Championships – Men's 3 metre springboard =

2013 World Aquatics 3 metre springboard competition

Men's 3 metre springboard at the 2013 World Aquatics Championships
- Dates: 25 July (preliminaries and semifinal); 26 July (final)
- Competitors: 46 from 31 nations
- Winning points: 544.95

Medalists
gold medal	He Chong	China
silver medal	Evgeny Kuznetsov	Russia
bronze medal	Yahel Castillo	Mexico

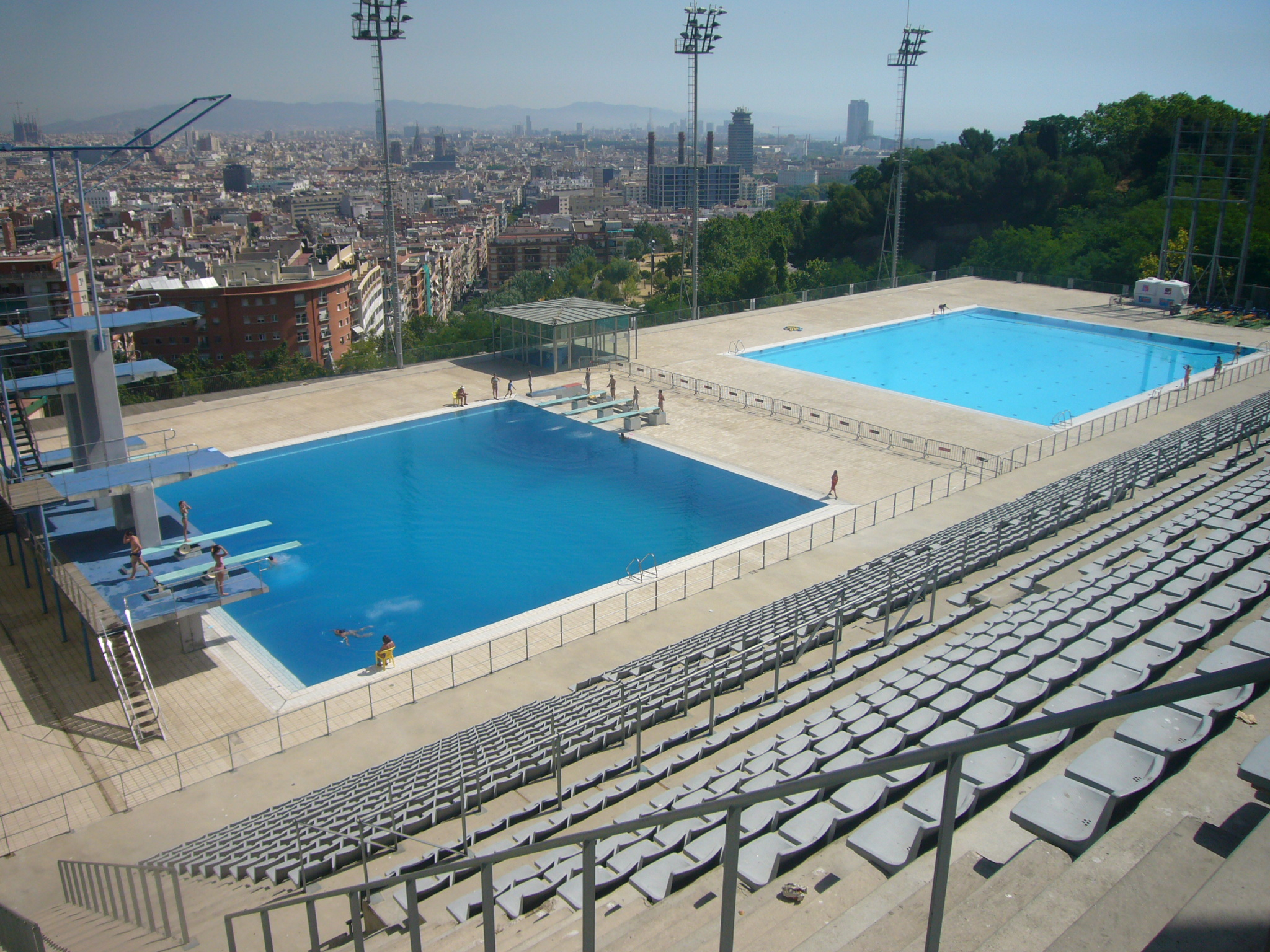
Piscina Municipal de Montjuïc - vista general

The men's 3 metre springboard competition at 2013 World Aquatics Championships was held on July 25 with the preliminary round and semifinal and the final on July 26.

== Results ==
The preliminary round was held on July 25 at 10:00 and the semifinal at 14:00 with the final on July 26 at 17:30.

Green denotes finalists

Blue denotes semifinalists

Rank	Diver	Nationality	Preliminary		Semifinal		Final	
Rank	Diver	Nationality	Points	Rank	Points	Rank	Points	Rank
1st place, gold medalist(s)	He Chong	China	421.85	6	483.15	2	544.95	1
2nd place, silver medalist(s)	Evgeny Kuznetsov	Russia	419.40	8	476.00	3	508.00	2
3rd place, bronze medalist(s)	Yahel Castillo	Mexico	438.25	5	465.90	4	498.30	3
4	Illya Kvasha	Ukraine	457.15	2	420.95	11	494.10	4
5	Qin Kai	China	417.50	9	493.65	1	473.25	5
6	Javier Illana	Spain	439.70	4	434.45	8	468.15	6
7	Patrick Hausding	Germany	409.40	13	447.75	5	445.75	7
8	Sho Sakai	Japan	421.75	7	416.10	12	433.40	8
9	Constantin Blaha	Austria	385.00	18	438.50	7	429.45	9
10	Oleksandr Gorshkovozov	Ukraine	392.50	17	433.95	9	425.85	10
11	Grant Nel	Australia	416.40	10	440.05	6	420.75	11
12	Kristian Ipsen	United States	413.90	12	427.55	10	413.35	12
13	Stefanos Paparounas	Greece	407.40	14	414.50	13		
14	Ilya Zakharov	Russia	396.15	16	414.20	14		
15	César Castro	Brazil	402.60	15	409.65	15		
16	Jack Laugher	Great Britain	471.85	1	405.10	16		
17	Yorick de Bruijn	Netherlands	414.70	11	390.05	17		
18	Stephan Feck	Germany	440.90	3	361.35	18		
19	Tommaso Rinaldi	Italy	383.95	19				
20	François Imbeau-Dulac	Canada	374.60	20				
21	Riley McCormick	Canada	374.50	21				
22	Kim Yeong-Nam	South Korea	373.20	22				
23	Chew Yi Wei	Malaysia	368.75	23				
24	Xie Zhen	Hong Kong	366.00	24				
25	Espen Valheim	Norway	364.85	25				
26	Rene Hernández	Cuba	364.30	26				
27	Andrzej Rzeszutek	Poland	358.25	27				
28	Michele Benedetti	Italy	356.40	28				
29	Ooi Tze Liang	Malaysia	354.45	29				
30	Sebastián Morales	Colombia	351.40	30				
31	Chris Mears	Great Britain	348.15	31				
32	Daniel Islas	Mexico	347.15	32				
33	Espen Bergslien	Norway	340.05	33				
34	Yona Knight-Wisdom	Jamaica	339.30	34				
35	Cho Kwan-Hoon	South Korea	337.05	35				
36	Yauheni Karaliou	Belarus	335.80	36				
37	Vinko Paradzik	Sweden	330.75	37				
38	Edickson Contreras	Venezuela	330.45	38				
39	Jorge Luis Pupo	Cuba	321.40	39				
40	Chola Chanturia	Georgia	317.50	40				
41	Frandiel Gomez	Dominican Republic	309.10	41				
42	Nicolás García	Spain	307.10	42				
43	Jesus Liranzo	Venezuela	292.95	43				
44	Abbas Abdulrahman	Kuwait	289.45	44				
45	Akhmad Sukran Jamjami	Indonesia	225.35	45				
46	Argenis Alvarez	Dominican Republic	200.75	46				
