= Mexico at the 2013 World Aquatics Championships =

- Flag of Mexico
- World Aquatics code: MEX
- National federation: Federación Mexicana de Natación
- Website: www.fmn.org.mx

in Barcelona, Spain
- Competitors: 47 in 5 sports
- Medals Ranked 26th: Gold 0 Silver 0 Bronze 4 Total 4

World Aquatics Championships appearances
- 1973; 1975; 1978; 1982; 1986; 1991; 1994; 1998; 2001; 2003; 2005; 2007; 2009; 2011; 2013; 2015; 2017; 2019; 2022; 2023; 2024; 2025

Mexico competed at the 2013 World Aquatics Championships in Barcelona, Spain between 19 July to 4 August 2013.

== Medalists ==
Medal	Name	Sport	Event	Date
Bronze	Kevin Chávez	Diving	Men's 1 m springboard	22 July
Bronze	Rommel Pacheco; Jahir Ocampo	Diving	Men's 3 m synchronized springboard	23 July
Bronze	Yahel Castillo	Diving	Men's 3 m springboard	26 July
Bronze	Jonathan Paredes	High diving	Men's high diving	31 July

== Diving ==
Mexico has qualified 13 divers.

Men

Athlete	Event	Preliminaries		Semifinals		Final	
Athlete	Event	Points	Rank	Points	Rank	Points	Rank
Kevin Chávez	1 m springboard	381.20	4 Q	—N/a		431.55	3rd place, bronze medalist(s)
Rommel Pacheco	1 m springboard	378.90	6 Q	—N/a		399.65	7
Yahel Castillo	3 m springboard	438.25	5 Q	465.90	4 Q	498.30	3rd place, bronze medalist(s)
Daniel Islas	3 m springboard	347.15	32	did not advance			
Iván García	10 m platform	423.80	9 Q	522.60	2 Q	502.75	5
Germán Sánchez	10 m platform	449.90	7 Q	473.40	5 Q	506.35	4
Rommel Pacheco; Jahir Ocampo	3 m synchronized springboard	404.97	6 Q	—N/a		422.79	3rd place, bronze medalist(s)
Germán Sánchez; Iván García	10 m synchronized platform	427.44	3 Q	—N/a		442.86	4

Women

Athlete	Event	Preliminaries		Semifinals		Final	
Athlete	Event	Points	Rank	Points	Rank	Points	Rank
Arantxa Chávez	1 m springboard	228.85	16	—N/a		did not advance	
Dolores Hernandez	1 m springboard	252.85	8 Q	—N/a		272.40	4
Paola Espinosa	3 m springboard	281.20	12 Q	334.50	4 Q	305.70	10
Laura Sánchez	3 m springboard	280.10	14 Q	310.95	8 Q	323.05	8
Alejandra Estrella	10 m platform	197.45	35	did not advance			
Alejandra Orozco	10 m platform	303.45	11 Q	300.10	12 Q	298.15	11
Arantxa Chávez; Laura Sánchez	3 m synchronized springboard	264.00	9 Q	—N/a		290.70	4
Paola Espinosa; Alejandra Orozco	10 m synchronized platform	314.25	2 Q	—N/a		306.39	6

== High diving ==
Mexico qualified 2 high divers.

Athlete	Event	Points	Rank
Jorge Ferzuli	Men's high diving	356.20	13
Jonathan Paredes	Men's high diving	578.35	3rd place, bronze medalist(s)

== Open water swimming ==
Mexico qualified 6 open water swimmers.

Athlete	Event	Time	Rank
Miguel Hernández	Men's 10 km	1:51:17.6	48
Iván López	Men's 10 km	1:50:22.8	35
Fernando Sevilla	Men's 5 km	DSQ	
Mayela Oropeza	Women's 5 km	1:03:01.1	34
Lizeth Rueda	Women's 10 km	1:58:36.6	22
Melissa Villasenor	Women's 10 km	2:05:21.1	43
Miguel Hernández; Iván López; Lizeth Rueda	Mixed team	58:17.7	16

== Swimming ==
Mexican swimmers earned qualifying standards in the following events (up to a maximum of 2 swimmers in each event at the A-standard entry time, and 1 at the B-standard):

Men

Athlete	Event	Heat		Semifinal		Final	
Athlete	Event	Time	Rank	Time	Rank	Time	Rank
Alejandro Escudero	50 m freestyle	23.07	41	did not advance			
Long Yuan Gutiérrez	200 m freestyle	1:52.94	48	did not advance			
David Oliver Mercado	50 m breaststroke	28.39	=43	did not advance			
David Oliver Mercado	100 m breaststroke	1:02.57	42	did not advance			
Arturo Pérez Vertti	400 m freestyle	3:57.28	31	—N/a		did not advance	
Arturo Pérez Vertti	800 m freestyle	8:09.23	28	—N/a		did not advance	
Arturo Pérez Vertti	1500 m freestyle	15:41.38	32	—N/a		did not advance	
Ramiro Ramírez	200 m butterfly	2:02.37	29	did not advance			
Miguel Robles Castro	200 m individual medley	2:05.43	44	did not advance			
Christian Schurr	200 m breaststroke	2:17.62	35	did not advance			
Ezequiel Trujillo	200 m backstroke	2:05.92	29	did not advance			
Ezequiel Trujillo	400 m individual medley	4:30.73	35	—N/a		did not advance	
Ramiro Ramírez; Arturo Pérez Vertti; Ezequiel Trujillo; Long Yuan Gutiérrez	4 × 200 m freestyle relay	7:38.51	18	—N/a		did not advance	
David Oliver Mercado; Ramiro Ramírez; Ezequiel Trujillo; Alejandro Escudero	4 × 100 m medley relay	3:45.39	21	—N/a		did not advance	

Women

Athlete	Event	Heat		Semifinal		Final	
Athlete	Event	Time	Rank	Time	Rank	Time	Rank
Erica Dittmer	50 m breaststroke	32.73	39	did not advance			
Erica Dittmer	100 m breaststroke	1:11.25	=36	did not advance			
Erica Dittmer	200 m individual medley	2:14.93 NR	22	did not advance			
Susana Escobar	400 m freestyle	4:13.37	18	—N/a		did not advance	
Susana Escobar	800 m freestyle	8:42.84	22	—N/a		did not advance	
Susana Escobar	1500 m freestyle	16:39.24	18	—N/a		did not advance	
Susana Escobar	400 m individual medley	4:47.18 NR	20	—N/a		did not advance	
Esther González	200 m breaststroke	2:32.82	25	did not advance			
Fernanda González	50 m backstroke	29.17	28	did not advance			
Fernanda González	100 m backstroke	1:01.84	23	did not advance			
Fernanda González	200 m backstroke	2:12.53	18	did not advance			
Liliana Ibáñez	50 m freestyle	25.51 NR	20	did not advance			
Liliana Ibáñez	100 m freestyle	55.70 NR	26	did not advance			
Liliana Ibáñez	200 m freestyle	2:02.61	30	did not advance			
Rita Medrano	50 m butterfly	28.20	39	did not advance			
Rita Medrano	200 m butterfly	2:12.41	18	did not advance			
Liliana Ibáñez; Susana Escobar; Fernanda González; Rita Medrano	4 × 200 m freestyle relay	8:11.56 NR	11	—N/a		did not advance	
Erica Dittmer; Liliana Ibáñez; Fernanda González; Rita Medrano	4 × 100 m medley relay	4:08.82 NR	13	—N/a		did not advance	

== Synchronized swimming ==
Mexico has qualified 13 synchronized swimmers.

Athlete	Event	Preliminaries		Final	
Athlete	Event	Points	Rank	Points	Rank
Nuria Diosdado	Solo free routine	82.820	15	did not advance	
Isabel Delgado; Nuria Diosdado	Duet free routine	83.040	14	did not advance	
Isabel Delgado; Nuria Diosdado	Duet technical routine	83.300	12 Q	83.800	12
Karem Achach; Karla Arreola; Mariana Cifuentes; Isabel Delgado; Nuria Diosdado; Joana Jímenez; Sofia Rios; Luisa Rubio; Brenda Prieto*; Amaya Velázquez*	Team technical routine	84.100	10 Q	83.700	11
Karem Achach; Karla Arreola; Mariana Cifuentes; Isabel Delgado; Nuria Diosdado; Joana Jímenez; Sofia Rios; Luisa Rubio; Brenda Prieto*; Amaya Velázquez*	Team free routine	83.850	9 Q	84.430	9
Karem Achach; Karla Arreola; Mariana Cifuentes; Isabel Delgado; Nuria Diosdado; Joana Jímenez; Sofia Rios; Jessica Sobrino; Regina Alferez*; Amaya Velázquez*	Free routine combination	84.240	9 Q	84.530	9
