= Diving at the 2013 World Aquatics Championships – Women's 3 metre springboard =

Women's 3 metre springboard at the 2013 World Aquatics Championships
- Dates: 26 July (preliminaries and semifinal); 27 July (final)
- Competitors: 43 from 28 nations
- Winning points: 383.40

Medalists
gold medal	He Zi	China
silver medal	Wang Han	China
bronze medal	Pamela Ware	Canada

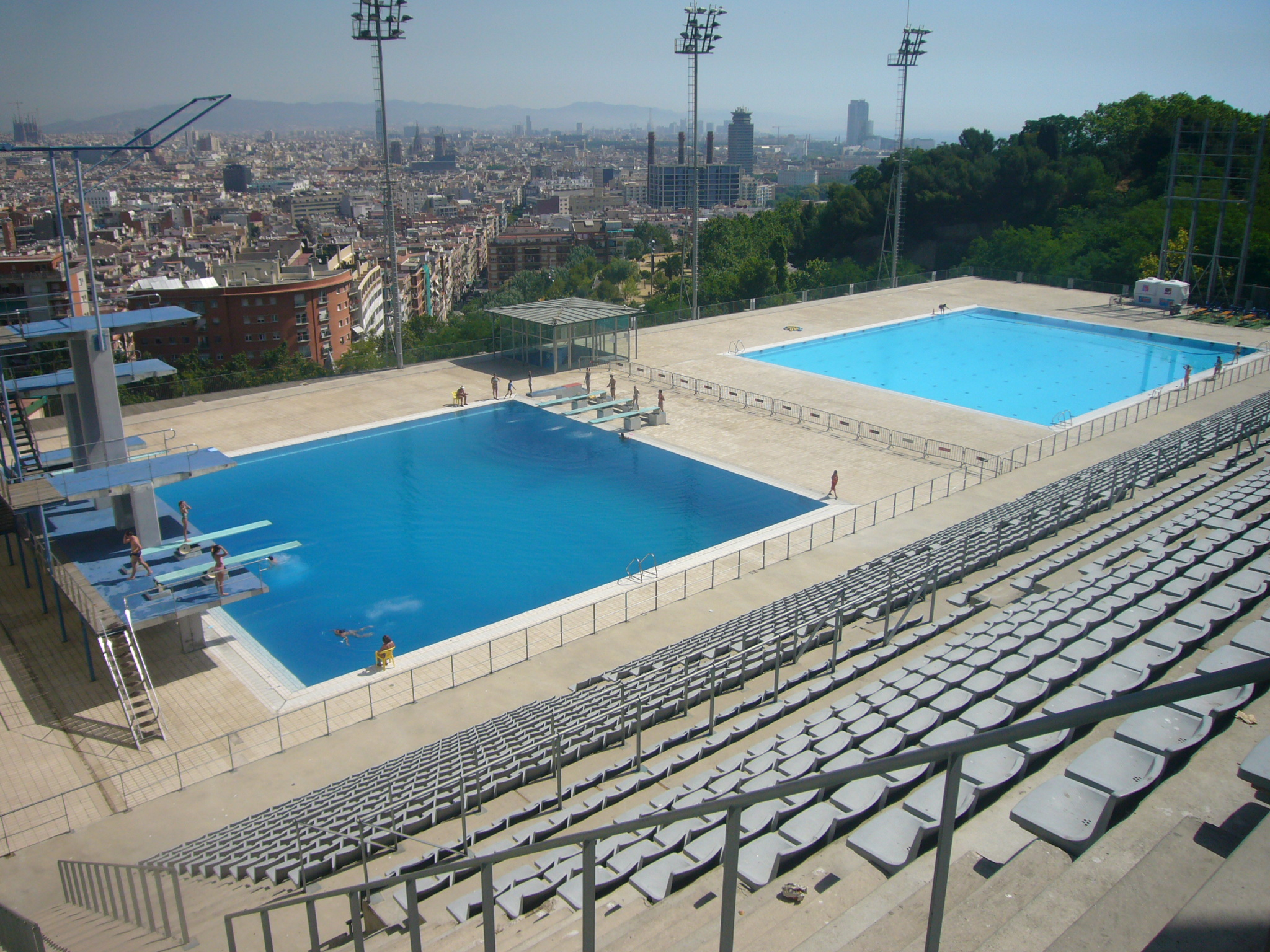
Piscina Municipal de Montjuïc - vista general

The women's 3 metre springboard competition at 2013 World Aquatics Championships was held on July 26 with the preliminary round and semifinal and the final on July 27.

== Results ==
The preliminary round was held on July 26 at 10:00 and the semifinal at 14:00 with the final on July 27 at 17:30.

Green denotes finalists

Blues denotes semifinalists

Rank	Diver	Nationality	Preliminary		Semifinal		Final	
Rank	Diver	Nationality	Points	Rank	Points	Rank	Points	Rank
1st place, gold medalist(s)	He Zi	China	341.50	1	370.00	1	383.40	1
2nd place, silver medalist(s)	Wang Han	China	321.00	2	362.40	2	356.25	2
3rd place, bronze medalist(s)	Pamela Ware	Canada	294.30	9	311.45	6	350.25	3
4	Tania Cagnotto	Italy	312.60	3	325.80	5	345.45	4
5	Jennifer Abel	Canada	286.60	11	344.10	3	339.75	5
6	Maria Marconi	Italy	308.05	5	301.75	10	334.05	6
7	Hannah Starling	Great Britain	310.90	4	297.35	12	326.20	7
8	Laura Sánchez	Mexico	280.10	14	310.95	8	323.05	8
9	Anabelle Smith	Australia	306.75	6	311.20	7	320.25	9
10	Paola Espinosa	Mexico	281.20	12	334.50	4	305.70	10
11	Maren Taylor	United States	273.30	15	307.90	9	304.60	11
12	Hanna Pysmenska	Ukraine	300.90	7	300.00	11	256.20	12
13	Tina Punzel	Germany	271.55	16	290.75	13		
14	Sayaka Shibusawa	Japan	262.80	18	284.25	14		
15	Jaele Patrick	Australia	291.60	10	276.50	15		
16	Olena Fedorova	Ukraine	281.10	13	277.30	16		
17	Ng Yan Yee	Malaysia	262.95	17	275.50	17		
18	Alicia Blagg	Great Britain	297.75	8	253.80	18		
19	Inge Jansen	Netherlands	261.70	19				
20	Cheong Jun Hoong	Malaysia	259.30	20				
21	Uschi Freitag	Netherlands	258.25	21				
22	Deidre Freeman	United States	256.80	22				
23	Luisa Jiménez	Puerto Rico	237.40	23				
24	Diana Pineda	Colombia	236.10	24				
25	Nicole Gillis	South Africa	235.80	25				
26	Huang En-tien	Chinese Taipei	229.20	26				
27	Maria Polyakova	Russia	229.05	27				
28	Johanna Johansson	Sweden	226.05	28				
29	Kim Su-ji	South Korea	223.20	29				
30	Tiia Kivela	Finland	220.15	30				
31	Daniella Nero	Sweden	217.80	31				
32	Julia Vincent	South Africa	215.75	32				
33	Carolina Murillo	Colombia	213.40	33				
34	Diana Chaplieva	Russia	208.50	34				
35	Cho Eun-Bi	South Korea	205.45	35				
36	Sophie Somloi	Austria	200.30	36				
37	Flóra Gondos	Hungary	200.20	37				
38	Lei Sio I	Macau	195.90	38				
39	Jenifer Benítez	Spain	192.70	39				
40	Leung Sze Man	Hong Kong	186.45	40				
41	Rocío Velásquez	Spain	177.30	41				
42	Danay Brizuela	Cuba	168.50	42				
43	Sari Ambarwati Suprihatin	Indonesia	153.15	43				
