= Greece at the 2013 World Aquatics Championships =

- Flag of Greece
- World Aquatics code: GRE
- National federation: Hellenic Swimming Federation
- Website: www.koe.org.gr

in Barcelona, Spain
- Medals Ranked 14th: Gold 1 Silver 1 Bronze 0 Total 2

World Aquatics Championships appearances
- 1973; 1975; 1978; 1982; 1986; 1991; 1994; 1998; 2001; 2003; 2005; 2007; 2009; 2011; 2013; 2015; 2017; 2019; 2022; 2023; 2024; 2025

Greece competed at the 2013 World Aquatics Championships in Barcelona, Spain between 19 July and 4 August 2013.

== Medalists ==
Medal	Name	Sport	Event	Date
Gold	Spyridon Gianniotis	Open water swimming	Men's 10 km	22 July
Silver	Antonios Fokaidis; Spyridon Gianniotis; Kalliopi Araouzou	Open water swimming	Mixed team	25 July

== Diving ==
Greece nominated two athletes to participate.

Men

Athlete	Event	Preliminaries		Semifinals		Final	
Athlete	Event	Points	Rank	Points	Rank	Points	Rank
Michail Fafalis	1 m springboard	329.60	18	—N/a		did not advance	
Stefanos Paparounas	3 m springboard	407.40	14 Q	414.50	13	did not advance	
Michail Fafalis; Stefanos Paparounas	3 m synchronized springboard	382.77	8 Q	—N/a		376.02	11

== Open water swimming ==
Greece nominated four athletes (two men and two women) to participate.

Athlete	Event	Time	Rank
Antonios Fokaidis	Men's 10 km	1:50:20.7	32
Antonios Fokaidis	Men's 25 km	4:50:55.1	17
Spyridon Gianniotis	Men's 10 km	1:49:11.8	1st place, gold medalist(s)
Spyridon Gianniotis	Men's 25 km	4:47:31.3	6
Kalliopi Araouzou	Women's 5 km	56:45.3	4
Kalliopi Araouzou	Women's 10 km	1:58:21.3	4
Marianna Lymperta	Women's 5 km	57:55.3	28
Marianna Lymperta	Women's 10 km	1:58:33.0	21
Antonios Fokaidis; Spyridon Gianniotis; Kalliopi Araouzou	Mixed team	54:03.3	2nd place, silver medalist(s)

== Swimming ==
Greek swimmers earned qualifying standards in the following events (up to a maximum of 2 swimmers in each event at the A-standard entry time, and 1 at the B-standard):

Men

Athlete	Event	Heat		Semifinal		Final	
Athlete	Event	Time	Rank	Time	Rank	Time	Rank
Kristian Golomeev	50 m freestyle	22.62	24	did not advance			
Ioannis Karpouzlis	50 m breaststroke	27.80	=25	did not advance			
Christos Katrantzis	50 m butterfly	24.29	33	did not advance			
Dimitrios Koulouris	200 m breaststroke	2:12.87	21	did not advance			
Panteleimon Pantis	50 m breaststroke	28.07	=33	did not advance			
Panagiotis Samilidis	100 m breaststroke	1:01.48	30	did not advance			
Panagiotis Samilidis	200 m breaststroke	2:11.71	16 Q	2:11.21	13	did not advance	

Women

Athlete	Event	Heat		Semifinal		Final	
Athlete	Event	Time	Rank	Time	Rank	Time	Rank
Theodora Drakou	50 m freestyle	25.87	=30	did not advance			
Theodora Drakou	50 m backstroke	28.81	=22	did not advance			
Kristel Vourna	50 m butterfly	27.49	34	did not advance			
Kristel Vourna	100 m butterfly	1:00.33	27	did not advance			

== Synchronized swimming ==
Greece has qualified thirteen synchronized swimmers.

Athlete	Event	Preliminaries		Final	
Athlete	Event	Points	Rank	Points	Rank
Despoina Solomou	Solo free routine	89.680	7 Q	88.800	7
Despoina Solomou	Solo technical routine	88.500	7 Q	89.600	7
Evangelia Platanioti; Despoina Solomou	Duet free routine	88.010	8 Q	87.980	7
Evangelia Platanioti; Despoina Solomou	Duet technical routine	89.200	7 Q	88.300	7
Maria Alzigkouzi; Konstantina Bachtsevanidou; Evangelia Gialidi; Giana Gkeorgkieva; Vasiliki Kafetzi; Evangelia Koutidi; Evangelia Papazoglou; Evangelia Platanioti; Despoina Solomou*; Sofia Tsipouridi*	Team free routine	85.510	8 Q	85.060	8
Maria Alzigkouzi; Konstantina Bachtsevanidou; Evangelia Gialidi; Vasiliki Kafetzi; Evangelia Koutidi; Evangelia Papazoglou; Evangelia Platanioti; Despoina Solomou; Giana Gkeorgkieva*; Sofia Tsipouridi*	Team technical routine	86.300	8 Q	86.400	8
Maria Alzigkouzi; Konstantina Bachtsevanidou; Evangelia Gialidi; Giana Gkeorgkieva; Vasiliki Kafetzi; Evangelia Koutidi; Evangelia Papazoglou; Evangelia Platanioti; Despoina Solomou; Sofia Tsipouridi	Free routine combination	87.470	7 Q	86.850	7

* Reserves

== Water polo ==
=== Men's tournament ===
Team roster

The following is the Greek roster in the men's water polo tournament of the 2013 World Aquatic championships.

№	Name	Pos.	Height	Weight	Date of birth	Club
1	Konstantinos Tsalkanis	GK	1.91 m (6 ft 3 in)	0 kg (0 lb)	23 April 1982	(Greece) NO Vouliagmeni
2	Emmanouil Mylonakis	D	1.85 m (6 ft 1 in)	75 kg (165 lb)	9 April 1985	(Greece) NO Vouliagmeni
3	Konstantinos Gouvis	CB	1.96 m (6 ft 5 in)	0 kg (0 lb)	16 February 1980	(Greece) NO Vouliagmeni
4	Konstantinos Genidounias	CF	2.01 m (6 ft 7 in)	0 kg (0 lb)	21 January 1980	(United States) USC Trojans
5	Ioannis Fountoulis	D	1.87 m (6 ft 2 in)	86 kg (190 lb)	25 May 1988	(Greece) Olympiacos Water Polo Club
6	Kyriakos Pontikeas	CB	1.90 m (6 ft 3 in)	0 kg (0 lb)	9 May 1991	(Greece) Olympiacos Water Polo Club
7	Christos Afroudakis	D	1.88 m (6 ft 2 in)	88 kg (194 lb)	23 May 1984	(Greece) NO Vouliagmeni
8	Evagelos Delakas	CB	1.90 m (6 ft 3 in)	88 kg (194 lb)	8 February 1985	(Greece) Olympiacos Water Polo Club
9	Konstantinos Mourikis	CF	1.98 m (6 ft 6 in)	115 kg (254 lb)	11 July 1988	(Greece) Olympiacos Water Polo Club
10	Christodoulos Kolomvos	CF	1.88 m (6 ft 2 in)	80 kg (176 lb)	26 October 1988	(Greece) Olympiacos Water Polo Club
11	Alexandros Gounas	D	1.80 m (5 ft 11 in)	70 kg (154 lb)	3 October 1989	(Greece) Olympiacos Water Polo Club
12	Angelos Vlachopoulos	D	1.80 m (5 ft 11 in)	75 kg (165 lb)	28 September 1991	(Greece) Olympiacos Water Polo Club
13	Konstantinos Galanidis	GK	2.02 m (6 ft 8 in)	0 kg (0 lb)	1 September 1990	(Greece) Olympiacos Water Polo Club

Head coach: Sakis Kechagias

Group play

	Pld	W	D	L	GF	GA	GD	Pts
Greece	3	3	0	0	38	15	+23	6
Montenegro	3	2	0	1	34	12	+22	4
Spain	3	1	0	2	30	18	+12	2
New Zealand	3	0	0	3	8	65	−57	0

22 July 2013; 09:30	Report	Montenegro	4–6	Greece	Piscines Bernat Picornell, Barcelona; Attendance: 300; Referees: Alexandrescu (ROU), Naumov (RUS)
22 July 2013; 09:30	Report	Score by quarters: 0–0, 0–3, 1–2, 3–1			Piscines Bernat Picornell, Barcelona; Attendance: 300; Referees: Alexandrescu (ROU), Naumov (RUS)
22 July 2013; 09:30	Report	Ivović 3	Goals	Mylonakis 3	Piscines Bernat Picornell, Barcelona; Attendance: 300; Referees: Alexandrescu (ROU), Naumov (RUS)

24 July 2013; 20:10	Report	New Zealand	4–24	Greece	Piscines Bernat Picornell, Barcelona; Attendance: 1,000; Referees: Reemnet (NED), Gaber (EGY)
24 July 2013; 20:10	Report	Score by quarters: 2–5, 1–8, 0–6, 1–4			Piscines Bernat Picornell, Barcelona; Attendance: 1,000; Referees: Reemnet (NED), Gaber (EGY)
24 July 2013; 20:10	Report	four players 1	Goals	Fountoulis 6	Piscines Bernat Picornell, Barcelona; Attendance: 1,000; Referees: Reemnet (NED), Gaber (EGY)

26 July 2013; 21:30	Report	Spain	7–8	Greece	Piscines Bernat Picornell, Barcelona; Attendance: 2,500; Referees: Koryzna (POL), Bianchi (ITA)
26 July 2013; 21:30	Report	Score by quarters: 1–1, 0–2, 2–3, 4–2			Piscines Bernat Picornell, Barcelona; Attendance: 2,500; Referees: Koryzna (POL), Bianchi (ITA)
26 July 2013; 21:30	Report	Molina, Minguell 3	Goals	Mylonakis 3	Piscines Bernat Picornell, Barcelona; Attendance: 2,500; Referees: Koryzna (POL), Bianchi (ITA)

Round of 16

28 July 2013; 09:30	Report	Greece	13–5	South Africa	Piscines Bernat Picornell, Barcelona; Attendance: 300; Referees: Abramović (MNE), Cardenuto (BRA)
28 July 2013; 09:30	Report	Score by quarters: 3–2, 3–2, 4–0, 3–1			Piscines Bernat Picornell, Barcelona; Attendance: 300; Referees: Abramović (MNE), Cardenuto (BRA)
28 July 2013; 09:30	Report	Gounas 3	Goals	five players 1	Piscines Bernat Picornell, Barcelona; Attendance: 300; Referees: Abramović (MNE), Cardenuto (BRA)

Quarterfinal

30 July 2013; 15:30	Report	Greece	3–9	Hungary	Piscines Bernat Picornell, Barcelona; Attendance: 900; Referees: Golijanin (SRB), Bender (GER)
30 July 2013; 15:30	Report	Score by quarters: 1–2, 1–1, 1–2, 0–4			Piscines Bernat Picornell, Barcelona; Attendance: 900; Referees: Golijanin (SRB), Bender (GER)
30 July 2013; 15:30	Report	three players 1	Goals	three players 2	Piscines Bernat Picornell, Barcelona; Attendance: 900; Referees: Golijanin (SRB), Bender (GER)

5th–8th place semifinal

1 August 2013; 15:30	Report	Greece	11–9	Australia	Piscines Bernat Picornell, Barcelona; Attendance: 600; Referees: Golijanin (SRB), Bianchi (ITA)
1 August 2013; 15:30	Report	Score by quarters: 3–1, 4–3, 2–4, 2–1			Piscines Bernat Picornell, Barcelona; Attendance: 600; Referees: Golijanin (SRB), Bianchi (ITA)
1 August 2013; 15:30	Report	Delakas, Vlachopoulos 3	Goals	Younger 3	Piscines Bernat Picornell, Barcelona; Attendance: 600; Referees: Golijanin (SRB), Bianchi (ITA)

Fifth place game

3 August 2013; 20:45	Report	Greece	8–10	Spain	Piscines Bernat Picornell, Barcelona; Attendance: 4,000; Referees: Golijanin (SRB), Flahive (AUS)
3 August 2013; 20:45	Report	Score by quarters: 2–1, 2–5, 4–2, 0–2			Piscines Bernat Picornell, Barcelona; Attendance: 4,000; Referees: Golijanin (SRB), Flahive (AUS)
3 August 2013; 20:45	Report	Delakas 3	Goals	Español 5	Piscines Bernat Picornell, Barcelona; Attendance: 4,000; Referees: Golijanin (SRB), Flahive (AUS)

=== Women's tournament ===
Team roster

- Eleni Kouvdou
- Christina Tsoukala
- Vasiliki Diamantopoulou
- Ilektra Psouni
- Margarita Plevritou
- Alkisti Avramidou
- Alexandra Asimaki
- Antigoni Roumpesi
- Christina Kotsia
- Triantafyllia Manolioudaki
- Eleftheria Plevritou
- Alkistis Benekou
- Chrysoula Diamantopoulou

Group play

	Pld	W	D	L	GF	GA	GD	Pts
United States	3	3	0	0	38	20	+18	6
Canada	3	1	1	1	30	27	+3	3
Greece	3	1	1	1	29	27	+2	3
Great Britain	3	0	0	3	20	43	−23	0

21 July 2013; 13:30	Report	United States	12–8	Greece	Piscines Bernat Picornell, Barcelona; Attendance: 360; Referees: Borrell (ESP), Koryzna (POL)
21 July 2013; 13:30	Report	Score by quarters: 1–2, 3–2, 4–2, 4–2			Piscines Bernat Picornell, Barcelona; Attendance: 360; Referees: Borrell (ESP), Koryzna (POL)
21 July 2013; 13:30	Report	Steffens 3	Goals	Tsoukala, Roumpesi 3	Piscines Bernat Picornell, Barcelona; Attendance: 360; Referees: Borrell (ESP), Koryzna (POL)

23 July 2013; 12:10	Report	Great Britain	7–13	Greece	Piscines Bernat Picornell, Barcelona; Attendance: 255; Referees: Reemnet (NED), Skovpina (UZB)
23 July 2013; 12:10	Report	Score by quarters: 1–1, 2–2, 2–5, 2–5			Piscines Bernat Picornell, Barcelona; Attendance: 255; Referees: Reemnet (NED), Skovpina (UZB)
23 July 2013; 12:10	Report	Gibson-Byrne, Gibson 2	Goals	Asimaki 5	Piscines Bernat Picornell, Barcelona; Attendance: 255; Referees: Reemnet (NED), Skovpina (UZB)

25 July 2013; 10:50	Report	Canada	8–8	Greece	Piscines Bernat Picornell, Barcelona; Attendance: 650; Referees: Taylan (TUR), Peris (CRO)
25 July 2013; 10:50	Report	Score by quarters: 2–3, 2–3, 3–0, 1–2			Piscines Bernat Picornell, Barcelona; Attendance: 650; Referees: Taylan (TUR), Peris (CRO)
25 July 2013; 10:50	Report	Eggens 4	Goals	Tsoukala, Asimaki 2	Piscines Bernat Picornell, Barcelona; Attendance: 650; Referees: Taylan (TUR), Peris (CRO)

Round of 16

27 July 2013; 21:30	Report	Italy	12–13 (OT)	Greece	Piscines Bernat Picornell, Barcelona; Attendance: 400; Referees: Margeta (SLO), Borrell (ESP)
27 July 2013; 21:30	Report	Score by quarters: 2–2, 2–3, 1–2, 4–2 OT: 1–1, 0–0 pen. 2–3			Piscines Bernat Picornell, Barcelona; Attendance: 400; Referees: Margeta (SLO), Borrell (ESP)
27 July 2013; 21:30	Report	Bianconi 3	Goals	Manolioudaki 4	Piscines Bernat Picornell, Barcelona; Attendance: 400; Referees: Margeta (SLO), Borrell (ESP)

Quarterfinal

29 July 2013; 17:00	Report	Australia	9–5	Greece	Piscines Bernat Picornell, Barcelona; Attendance: 500; Referees: Margeta (SLO), Alexandrescu (ROU)
29 July 2013; 17:00	Report	Score by quarters: 3–1, 1–1, 2–2, 3–1			Piscines Bernat Picornell, Barcelona; Attendance: 500; Referees: Margeta (SLO), Alexandrescu (ROU)
29 July 2013; 17:00	Report	four players 2	Goals	Avramidou, Roumpesi 2	Piscines Bernat Picornell, Barcelona; Attendance: 500; Referees: Margeta (SLO), Alexandrescu (ROU)

5th–8th place semifinal

31 July 2013; 15:30	Report	Canada	8–12	Greece	Piscines Bernat Picornell, Barcelona; Attendance: 400; Referees: Moller (ARG), Taylan (TUR)
31 July 2013; 15:30	Report	Score by quarters: 1–5, 3–1, 1–5, 3–1			Piscines Bernat Picornell, Barcelona; Attendance: 400; Referees: Moller (ARG), Taylan (TUR)
31 July 2013; 15:30	Report	Wright, Eggens 2	Goals	Tsoukala 4	Piscines Bernat Picornell, Barcelona; Attendance: 400; Referees: Moller (ARG), Taylan (TUR)

Fifth place game

2 August 2013; 20:45	Report	Greece	12–15 (OT)	United States	Piscines Bernat Picornell, Barcelona; Attendance: 4,400; Referees: Terepenka (CAN), Taylan (TUR)
2 August 2013; 20:45	Report	Score by quarters: 4–4, 1–2, 1–3, 4–1 OT: 1–0, 0–1 pen. 1–4			Piscines Bernat Picornell, Barcelona; Attendance: 4,400; Referees: Terepenka (CAN), Taylan (TUR)
2 August 2013; 20:45	Report	Avramidou 4	Goals	Mathewson 3	Piscines Bernat Picornell, Barcelona; Attendance: 4,400; Referees: Terepenka (CAN), Taylan (TUR)
