= New Zealand at the 2013 World Aquatics Championships =

- Flag of New Zealand
- World Aquatics code: NZL
- National federation: Swimming New Zealand
- Website: swimmingnz.org.nz

in Barcelona, Spain
- Medals Ranked 27th: Gold 0 Silver 0 Bronze 3 Total 3

World Aquatics Championships appearances
- 1973; 1975; 1978; 1982; 1986; 1991; 1994; 1998; 2001; 2003; 2005; 2007; 2009; 2011; 2013; 2015; 2017; 2019; 2022; 2023; 2024; 2025

New Zealand competed at the 2013 World Aquatics Championships in Barcelona, Spain between 19 July and 4 August 2013.

== Medalists ==
Medal	Name	Sport	Event	Date
Bronze	Lauren Boyle	Swimming	Women's 400 m freestyle	28 July
Bronze	Lauren Boyle	Swimming	Women's 1500 m freestyle	30 July
Bronze	Lauren Boyle	Swimming	Women's 800 m freestyle	3 August

== Open water swimming ==
New Zealand qualified four quota places for the following events in open water swimming.

Athlete	Event	Time	Rank
Kane Radford	Men's 5 km	53:44.3	18
Kane Radford	Men's 10 km	1:49:43.0	20
Phillip Ryan	Men's 5 km	56:17.5	38
Phillip Ryan	Men's 10 km	1:51:11.3	45
Phillip Ryan	Men's 25 km	4:50:57.2	18
Cara Baker	Women's 5 km	56:46.2	6
Cara Baker	Women's 10 km	1:58:38.5	23
Emma Robinson	Women's 5 km	57:29.5	24
Emma Robinson	Women's 10 km	2:01:47.6	34
Kane Radford; Phillip Ryan; Cara Baker	Mixed team	56:12.0	9

== Swimming ==
New Zealand swimmers achieved qualifying standards in the following events (up to a maximum of 2 swimmers in each event at the A-standard entry time, and 1 at the B-standard):

Men

Athlete	Event	Heat		Semifinal		Final	
Athlete	Event	Time	Rank	Time	Rank	Time	Rank
Shaun Burnett	200 m butterfly	1:59.35	24	did not advance			
Nathan Capp	400 m individual medley	4:23.27	22	—N/a		did not advance	
Mitchell Donaldson	200 m individual medley	2:03.89	40	did not advance			
Gareth Kean	50 m backstroke	25.62	18	did not advance			
Gareth Kean	100 m backstroke	54.37	14 Q	53.81	8 Q	54.25	8
Gareth Kean	200 m backstroke	2:02.81	24	did not advance			
Glenn Snyders	50 m breaststroke	27.27	3 Q	27.22	6 Q	27.21	6
Glenn Snyders	100 m breaststroke	59.92	5 Q	1:00.22	13	did not advance	
Glenn Snyders	200 m breaststroke	2:13.10	22	did not advance			
Matthew Stanley	200 m freestyle	1:48.01	11 Q	1:48.35	16	did not advance	
Matthew Stanley	400 m freestyle	3:48.25	10	—N/a		did not advance	
Shaun Burnett; Gareth Kean; Glenn Snyders; Matthew Stanley	4×100 m medley relay	3:37.70	14	—N/a		did not advance	

Women

Athlete	Event	Heat		Semifinal		Final	
Athlete	Event	Time	Rank	Time	Rank	Time	Rank
Sophia Batchelor	200 m backstroke	2:12.89	20	did not advance			
Sophia Batchelor	50 m butterfly	26.45	=11 Q	26.34	11	did not advance	
Sophia Batchelor	100 m butterfly	59.46	23	did not advance			
Lauren Boyle	400 m freestyle	4:04.96	4 Q	—N/a		4:03.89	3rd place, bronze medalist(s)
Lauren Boyle	800 m freestyle	8:21.00 OC	2 Q	—N/a		8:18.58 OC	3rd place, bronze medalist(s)
Lauren Boyle	1500 m freestyle	16:02.90	6 Q	—N/a		15:44.71 OC	3rd place, bronze medalist(s)
Samantha Lee	200 m butterfly	2:11.95	17	did not advance			
Samantha Lucie-Smith	200 m freestyle	1:58.87	15 Q	1:59.26	16	did not advance	
Samantha Lucie-Smith	400 m individual medley	4:49.73	23	—N/a		did not advance	

== Synchronized swimming ==
New Zealand has qualified twelve synchronized swimmers.

Athlete	Event	Preliminaries		Final	
Athlete	Event	Points	Rank	Points	Rank
Kirstin Anderson	Solo free routine	71.650	28	did not advance	
Kirstin Anderson	Solo technical routine	69.900	29	did not advance	
Caitlin Anderson; Kirstin Anderson	Duet free routine	70.460	29	did not advance	
Caitlin Anderson; Kirstin Anderson	Duet technical routine	71.200	23	did not advance	
Kelsey Acker; Caitlin Anderson; Kirstin Anderson; Aleisha Braven; Hayley Fibbens; Kira Fox*; Leticia Hart; Victoria Hohaia; Abigail Hustler; Katherine McDougall; Scarlett Polley*; Anastasia Wilkes	Free routine combination	68.600	16	did not advance	

== Water polo ==
=== Men's tournament ===
Team roster

- Thomas Kingsmill
- Matthew Lewis
- Stefan Curry
- Finn Lowery
- Jonathon Ross
- Andrew Sieprath
- Daniel Jackson
- Matthew Small
- Eamon Lui-Fakaotimanava
- Matthew Bryant
- Lachlan Tijsen
- Adam Pye
- Dylan Smith

Group play

	Pld	W	D	L	GF	GA	GD	Pts
Greece	3	3	0	0	38	15	+23	6
Montenegro	3	2	0	1	34	12	+22	4
Spain	3	1	0	2	30	18	+12	2
New Zealand	3	0	0	3	8	65	−57	0

22 July 2013; 21:30	Report	Spain	18–3	New Zealand	Piscines Bernat Picornell, Barcelona; Attendance: 900; Referees: Balfanbayev (KAZ), Gaber (EGY)
22 July 2013; 21:30	Report	Score by quarters: 3–0, 3–1, 7–1, 5–1			Piscines Bernat Picornell, Barcelona; Attendance: 900; Referees: Balfanbayev (KAZ), Gaber (EGY)
22 July 2013; 21:30	Report	Perrone 5	Goals	Lui-Fakaotimanava 2	Piscines Bernat Picornell, Barcelona; Attendance: 900; Referees: Balfanbayev (KAZ), Gaber (EGY)

24 July 2013; 20:10	Report	New Zealand	4–24	Greece	Piscines Bernat Picornell, Barcelona; Attendance: 1,000; Referees: Reemnet (NED), Gaber (EGY)
24 July 2013; 20:10	Report	Score by quarters: 2–5, 1–8, 0–6, 1–4			Piscines Bernat Picornell, Barcelona; Attendance: 1,000; Referees: Reemnet (NED), Gaber (EGY)
24 July 2013; 20:10	Report	four players 1	Goals	Fountoulis 6	Piscines Bernat Picornell, Barcelona; Attendance: 1,000; Referees: Reemnet (NED), Gaber (EGY)

26 July 2013; 17:30	Report	Montenegro	23–1	New Zealand	Piscines Bernat Picornell, Barcelona; Attendance: 550; Referees: Cardenuto (BRA), Gaber (EGY)
26 July 2013; 17:30	Report	Score by quarters: 5–0, 8–1, 6–0, 4–0			Piscines Bernat Picornell, Barcelona; Attendance: 550; Referees: Cardenuto (BRA), Gaber (EGY)
26 July 2013; 17:30	Report	Ivović 6	Goals	Pye 1	Piscines Bernat Picornell, Barcelona; Attendance: 550; Referees: Cardenuto (BRA), Gaber (EGY)

Round of 16

28 July 2013; 12:10	Report	Croatia	21–4	New Zealand	Piscines Bernat Picornell, Barcelona; Attendance: 600; Referees: Drury (USA), Melliar (RSA)
28 July 2013; 12:10	Report	Score by quarters: 6–1, 4–2, 8–0, 3–1			Piscines Bernat Picornell, Barcelona; Attendance: 600; Referees: Drury (USA), Melliar (RSA)
28 July 2013; 12:10	Report	Muslim, Sukno 5	Goals	four players 1	Piscines Bernat Picornell, Barcelona; Attendance: 600; Referees: Drury (USA), Melliar (RSA)

=== Women's tournament ===
Team roster

- Brooke Millar
- Emily Cox
- Kelly Mason
- Nicole Lewis
- Alexandra Boyd
- Lynlee Smith
- Sarah Landry
- Danielle Lewis
- Lauren Sieprath
- Casie Bowry
- Kirsten Hudson
- Alexandra Myles
- Ianeta Hutchinson

Group play

	Pld	W	D	L	GF	GA	GD	Pts
Australia	3	3	0	0	45	10	+35	6
China	3	2	0	1	35	21	+14	4
New Zealand	3	1	0	2	22	35	−13	2
South Africa	3	0	0	3	10	46	−36	0

21 July 2013; 10:50	Report	Australia	15–4	New Zealand	Piscines Bernat Picornell, Barcelona; Attendance: 320; Referees: Vogel (HUN), Cardenuto (BRA)
21 July 2013; 10:50	Report	Score by quarters: 3–1, 4–2, 4–0, 4–1			Piscines Bernat Picornell, Barcelona; Attendance: 320; Referees: Vogel (HUN), Cardenuto (BRA)
21 July 2013; 10:50	Report	Webster 4	Goals	Mason 2	Piscines Bernat Picornell, Barcelona; Attendance: 320; Referees: Vogel (HUN), Cardenuto (BRA)

23 July 2013; 09:30	Report	South Africa	7–13	New Zealand	Piscines Bernat Picornell, Barcelona; Attendance: 200; Referees: Koryzna (POL), Abramović (MNE)
23 July 2013; 09:30	Report	Score by quarters: 2–3, 1–3, 1–3, 3–4			Piscines Bernat Picornell, Barcelona; Attendance: 200; Referees: Koryzna (POL), Abramović (MNE)
23 July 2013; 09:30	Report	White 3	Goals	Hudson, Myles 4	Piscines Bernat Picornell, Barcelona; Attendance: 200; Referees: Koryzna (POL), Abramović (MNE)

25 July 2013; 20:10	Report	China	13–5	New Zealand	Piscines Bernat Picornell, Barcelona; Attendance: 400; Referees: Cardenuto (BRA), Littlejohn (GBR)
25 July 2013; 20:10	Report	Score by quarters: 2–0, 4–1, 5–3, 2–1			Piscines Bernat Picornell, Barcelona; Attendance: 400; Referees: Cardenuto (BRA), Littlejohn (GBR)
25 July 2013; 20:10	Report	Sun Yujun, Song Donglun 3	Goals	Myles 2	Piscines Bernat Picornell, Barcelona; Attendance: 400; Referees: Cardenuto (BRA), Littlejohn (GBR)

Round of 16

27 July 2013; 13:30	Report	Spain	18–6	New Zealand	Piscines Bernat Picornell, Barcelona; Attendance: 450; Referees: Melliar (RSA), Golijanin (SRB)
27 July 2013; 13:30	Report	Score by quarters: 5–1, 4–2, 3–2, 6–1			Piscines Bernat Picornell, Barcelona; Attendance: 450; Referees: Melliar (RSA), Golijanin (SRB)
27 July 2013; 13:30	Report	Pareja 5	Goals	Hudson, Myles 2	Piscines Bernat Picornell, Barcelona; Attendance: 450; Referees: Melliar (RSA), Golijanin (SRB)
