= Diving at the 2013 World Aquatics Championships – Men's 10 metre platform =

Men's 10 metre platform at the 2013 World Aquatics Championships
- Dates: 27 July (preliminaries and semifinal); 28 July (final)
- Competitors: 30 from 18 nations
- Winning points: 581.00

Medalists
gold medal	Qiu Bo	China
silver medal	David Boudia	United States
bronze medal	Sascha Klein	Germany

The men's 10 metre platform competition at 2013 World Aquatics Championships was held on July 27 with the preliminary round and semifinal and the final on July 28.

== Results ==
The preliminary round was held on July 27 at 10:00 and the semifinal at 14:00 with the final on July 28 at 14:00.

Green denotes finalists

Blue denotes semifinalists

Rank	Diver	Nationality	Preliminary		Semifinal		Final	
Rank	Diver	Nationality	Points	Rank	Points	Rank	Points	Rank
1st place, gold medalist(s)	Qiu Bo	China	524.40	1	457.55	6	581.00	1
2nd place, silver medalist(s)	David Boudia	United States	503.30	2	534.40	1	517.40	2
3rd place, bronze medalist(s)	Sascha Klein	Germany	482.55	4	505.85	3	508.55	3
4	Germán Sánchez	Mexico	449.90	7	473.40	5	506.35	4
5	Iván García	Mexico	423.80	9	522.60	2	502.75	5
6	Tom Daley	Great Britain	406.40	13	452.70	7	470.60	6
7	Oleksandr Bondar	Ukraine	457.70	5	442.85	11	464.75	7
8	Victor Minibaev	Russia	486.55	3	480.30	4	449.75	8
9	Vadim Kaptur	Belarus	425.90	8	430.65	12	447.30	9
10	Jeinkler Aguirre	Cuba	416.10	11	452.15	8	417.30	10
11	Sergey Nazin	Russia	382.90	17	447.20	10	410.10	11
12	Andrea Chiarabini	Italy	418.60	10	451.70	9	370.75	12
13	Juan Rios Lopera	Colombia	404.35	14	421.05	13		
14	Ooi Tze Liang	Malaysia	412.55	12	411.75	14		
15	Kim Sun-Bom	North Korea	377.20	18	411.30	15		
16	Anton Zakharov	Ukraine	400.55	16	396.50	16		
17	Lin Yue	China	456.00	6	387.10	17		
18	Dominik Stein	Germany	403.45	15	325.05	18		
19	Harry Jones	United States	375.00	19				
20	Robert Páez	Venezuela	367.25	20				
21	Jesper Tolvers	Sweden	359.10	21				
22	Maicol Verzotto	Italy	355.10	22				
23	Espen Valheim	Norway	344.45	23				
24	Lev Sargsyan	Armenia	333.40	24				
25	Daniel Jensen	Norway	328.45	25				
26	So Myong-Hyok	North Korea	324.05	26				
27	Woo Ha-Ram	South Korea	321.90	27				
28	Daniel Goodfellow	Great Britain	318.55	28				
29	Yumandy Paz Gamboa	Cuba	305.05	29				
30	Kim Yeong-Nam	South Korea	297.15	30				
