= North Korea at the 2013 World Aquatics Championships =

- Flag of North Korea
- FINA code: PRK
- National federation: North Korean Aquatics Federation

in Barcelona, Spain
- Competitors: 15 in 2 sports
- Medals: Gold 0 Silver 0 Bronze 0 Total 0

World Aquatics Championships appearances
- 1973; 1975; 1978; 1982; 1986; 1991; 1994; 1998; 2001; 2003; 2005; 2007; 2009; 2011; 2013; 2015; 2017; 2019; 2022; 2023; 2024

North Korea is competing at the 2013 World Aquatics Championships in Barcelona, Spain between 19 July and 4 August 2013.

== Diving ==
North Korea qualified five quota places for the following diving events.

Men

Athlete	Event	Preliminaries		Semifinals		Final	
Athlete	Event	Points	Rank	Points	Rank	Points	Rank
Kim Sun-Bom	10 m platform	377.20	18 Q	411.30	15	did not advance	
So Myong-Hyok	10 m platform	324.05	26	did not advance			
Kim Sun-Bom; So Myong-Hyok	10 m synchronized platform	347.28	10 Q	—		376.56	9

Women

Athlete	Event	Preliminaries		Semifinals		Final	
Athlete	Event	Points	Rank	Points	Rank	Points	Rank
Choe Hyang	10 m platform	246.95	28	did not advance			
Kim Jin-Ok	10 m platform	302.55	12 Q	291.90	15	did not advance	
Choe Un-Gyong; Kim Jin-Ok	3 m synchronized springboard	285.30	8 Q	—		276.54	9

== Synchronized swimming ==
North Korea has qualified ten synchronized swimmers.

Athlete	Event	Preliminaries		Final	
Athlete	Event	Points	Rank	Points	Rank
Ri Ji-Hyang	Solo free routine	84.600	11 Q	84.910	10
Kang Un-Ha	Solo technical routine	84.400	12 Q	85.100	12
Kim Jong-Hui; Ri Ji-Hyang	Duet free routine	85.840	11 Q	85.780	11
Kim Jin-Gyong; Kim Jong-Hui	Duet technical routine	84.100	10 Q	84.700	10
Jang Hyang-Mi; Jong Na-Ri; Jong Yon-Hui; Kang Un-Ha*; Kim Un-A*; Kim Jin-Gyong; Kim Jong-Hui; Kim Ju-Hye; Ri Il-Sim; Ri Ji-Hyang	Team technical routine	83.800	11 Q	84.300	9
Jang Hyang-Mi; Jong Na-Ri; Jong Yon-Hui; Kang Un-Ha; Kim Un-A; Kim Jin-Gyong; Kim Jong-Hui; Kim Ju-Hye; Ri Il-Sim; Ri Ji-Hyang	Free routine combination	83.790	10 Q	83.560	10
