= Diving at the 2013 World Aquatics Championships – Women's 10 metre platform =

Women's 10 metre platform at the 2013 World Aquatics Championships
- Dates: 24 July (preliminaries and semifinal); 25 July (final)
- Competitors: 36 from 22 nations
- Winning points: 392.15

Medalists
gold medal	Si Yajie	China
silver medal	Chen Ruolin	China
bronze medal	Yulia Prokopchuk	Ukraine

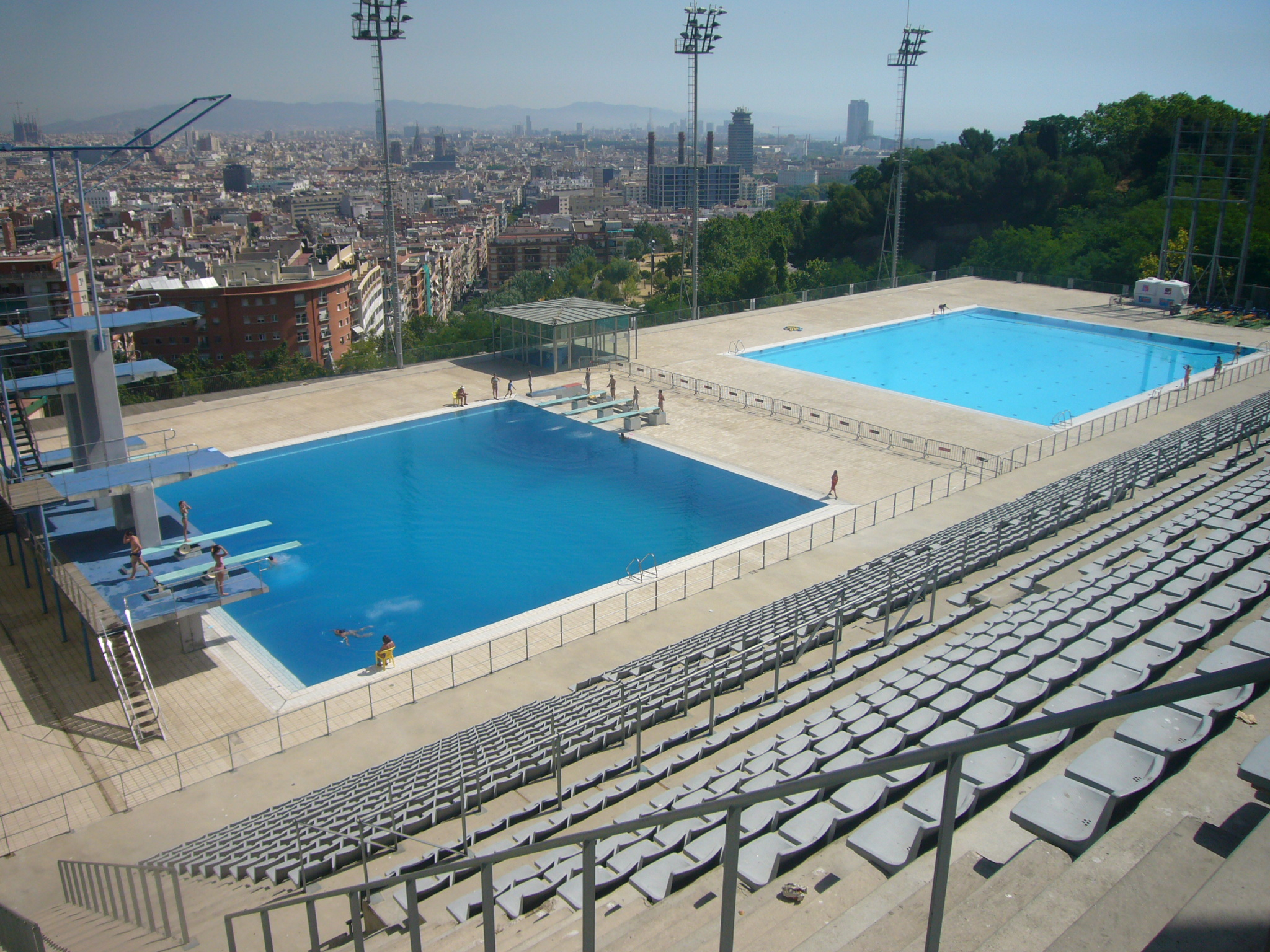
Piscina Municipal de Montjuïc - vista general

The women's 10 metre platform competition at 2013 World Aquatics Championships was held on July 24 with the preliminary round and semifinal and the final on July 25.

== Results ==
The preliminary round was held on July 24 at 10:00 and the semifinal at 14:00 with the final on July 25 at 17:30.

Green denotes finalists

Blue denotes semifinalists

Rank	Diver	Nationality	Preliminary		Semifinal		Final	
Rank	Diver	Nationality	Points	Rank	Points	Rank	Points	Rank
1st place, gold medalist(s)	Si Yajie	China	360.35	1	341.85	3	392.15	1
2nd place, silver medalist(s)	Chen Ruolin	China	350.60	3	373.65	1	388.70	2
3rd place, bronze medalist(s)	Yulia Prokopchuk	Ukraine	328.25	4	302.40	11	358.40	3
4	Sarah Barrow	Great Britain	309.00	10	316.05	6	346.45	4
5	Maria Kurjo	Germany	294.05	15	317.60	5	336.55	5
6	Pandelela Rinong	Malaysia	351.05	2	314.15	8	334.55	6
7	María Betancourt	Venezuela	309.30	9	314.65	7	328.35	7
8	Roseline Filion	Canada	301.85	13	327.45	4	316.70	8
9	Tonia Couch	Great Britain	317.25	8	368.15	2	311.00	9
10	Victoria Lamp	United States	279.25	18	312.25	9	301.20	10
11	Alejandra Orozco	Mexico	303.45	11	300.10	12	298.15	11
12	Laura Marino	France	298.65	14	303.25	10	289.70	12
13	Hanna Krasnoshlyk	Ukraine	290.25	16	294.75	13		
14	Amelia Cozad	United States	325.20	5	294.00	14		
15	Kim Jin-Ok	North Korea	302.55	12	291.90	15		
16	Brittany Broben	Australia	285.65	17	287.30	16		
17	Mai Nakagawa	Japan	321.65	6	272.05	17		
18	Fuka Tatsumi	Japan	320.50	7	267.80	18		
19	Ekaterina Petukhova	Russia	278.75	19				
20	Villő Kormos	Hungary	278.05	20				
21	Yulia Timoshinina	Russia	271.20	21				
22	Carolina Murillo	Colombia	269.95	22				
23	Kieu Duong	Germany	266.60	23				
24	Carol-Ann Ware	Canada	260.90	24				
25	Zsófia Reisinger	Hungary	250.45	25				
26	Mara Aiacoboae	Romania	249.40	26				
27	Jaimee Gundry	South Africa	248.95	27				
28	Choe Hy-Ang	North Korea	246.95	28				
29	Cho Eun-Bi	South Korea	245.45	29				
30	Traisy Vivien Tukiet	Malaysia	244.95	30				
31	Noemi Batki	Italy	244.90	31				
32	Kim Su-ji	South Korea	235.20	32				
33	Lisette Ramirez	Venezuela	221.00	33				
34	Annia Rivera	Cuba	217.20	34				
35	Alejandra Estrella	Mexico	197.45	35				
36	Linadini Yasmin	Indonesia	148.85	36				
