= Swimming at the 2013 World Aquatics Championships – Men's 100 metre backstroke =

Men's 100 metre backstroke at the 2013 World Aquatics Championships
- Venue: Palau Sant Jordi
- Date: July 29, 2013 (heats & semifinals); July 30, 2013 (final)
- Competitors: 53 from 49 nations
- Winning time: 52.93

Medalists
gold medal	Matt Grevers	United States
silver medal	David Plummer	United States
bronze medal	Jérémy Stravius	France

Barcelona Palau San Jordi

The men's 100 metre backstroke event in swimming at the 2013 World Aquatics Championships took place on 29–30 July at the Palau Sant Jordi in Barcelona, Spain.

== Records ==
Prior to this competition, the existing world and championship records were:

World record	Aaron Peirsol (USA)	51.94	Indianapolis, United States	8 July 2009
Competition record	Aaron Peirsol (USA)	52.19	Rome, Italy	2 August 2009

== Results ==
=== Heats ===
The heats were held at 10:14.

Rank	Heat	Lane	Name	Nationality	Time	Notes
1	6	6	Ashley Delaney	Australia	53.60	Q
2	5	5	David Plummer	United States	53.62	Q
3	6	7	Xu Jiayu	China	53.63	Q
4	5	4	Ryosuke Irie	Japan	53.66	Q
5	4	4	Jérémy Stravius	France	53.85	Q
6	6	4	Matt Grevers	United States	53.92	Q
7	6	5	Kosuke Hagino	Japan	53.94	Q
8	4	3	László Cseh	Hungary	54.06	Q
9	5	2	Bastiaan Lijesen	Netherlands	54.07	Q
10	4	2	Radosław Kawęcki	Poland	54.20	Q
10	5	6	Camille Lacourt	France	54.20	Q
12	5	3	Chris Walker-Hebborn	Great Britain	54.23	Q
13	4	5	Cheng Feiyi	China	54.30	Q
14	6	3	Gareth Kean	New Zealand	54.37	Q
15	1	5	Darren Murray	South Africa	54.64	Q
16	4	6	Charles Francis	Canada	54.72	Q
17	6	2	Aschwin Wildeboer	Spain	54.75	
18	5	7	Mirco di Tora	Italy	54.76	
19	6	1	Yakov-Yan Toumarkin	Israel	54.85	
20	5	9	Federico Grabich	Argentina	55.03	
21	5	1	Daniel Orzechowski	Brazil	55.09	
22	4	7	Pavel Sankovich	Belarus	55.13	
23	6	8	Lavrans Solli	Norway	55.52	
24	6	9	I Gede Siman Sudartawa	Indonesia	55.55	
25	4	0	Danas Rapšys	Lithuania	55.68	
26	5	0	Alexandr Tarabrin	Kazakhstan	55.70	
27	4	1	Felix Wolf	Germany	55.88	
28	6	0	Lukas Räuftlin	Switzerland	56.11	
29	5	8	Pedro Medel	Cuba	56.12	
30	3	5	Martin Baďura	Czech Republic	56.19	
31	3	6	Charles Hockin	Paraguay	56.50	
32	3	3	Danil Bukin	Uzbekistan	56.63	
33	4	9	Guven Duvan	Turkey	56.78	
34	3	4	Jean-François Schneiders	Luxembourg	56.88	
35	4	8	Shin Hee-Wong	South Korea	56.95	
36	3	9	Boris Kirillov	Azerbaijan	58.17	
37	3	8	Ngou Pok Man	Macau	58.26	
38	3	7	Heshan Unamboowe	Sri Lanka	58.49	
39	2	4	Artiom Gladun	Moldova	58.60	
40	3	0	Jean Luis Gómez	Dominican Republic	59.30	
41	3	1	Awse Ma'aya	Jordan	59.75	
42	3	2	Khachik Plavchyan	Armenia	59.79	NR
43	2	3	Gorazd Chepishevski	North Macedonia	1:00.11	
44	2	5	Rodrigo Soriano	El Salvador	1:00.79	
45	2	6	Jordan Augier	Saint Lucia	1:00.99	NR
46	2	2	Hamdan Bayusuf	Kenya	1:01.05	
47	2	7	Eisner Barberena	Nicaragua	1:01.44	
48	1	3	Maroun Waked	Lebanon	1:02.23	
49	2	1	Yaaqoub Al-Saadi	United Arab Emirates	1:02.97	
50	2	8	Victor Torres	U.S. Virgin Islands	1:04.41	
51	2	0	Erdenemunkh Demuul	Mongolia	1:05.18	
52	1	4	Faraj Saleh Faraj Sultan	Bahrain	1:05.67	
53	2	9	Andrianirina Lalanomena	Madagascar	1:06.10	

=== Semifinals ===
The semifinals were held at 18:18.

==== Semifinal 1 ====
Rank	Lane	Name	Nationality	Time	Notes
1	3	Matt Grevers	United States	52.97	Q
2	4	David Plummer	United States	53.10	Q
3	5	Ryosuke Irie	Japan	53.41	Q
4	1	Gareth Kean	New Zealand	53.81	Q
5	2	Radosław Kawęcki	Poland	53.82	
6	7	Chris Walker-Hebborn	Great Britain	53.96	
7	6	László Cseh	Hungary	54.00	
8	8	Charles Francis	Canada	54.96	

==== Semifinal 2 ====
Rank	Lane	Name	Nationality	Time	Notes
1	3	Jérémy Stravius	France	53.23	Q
2	7	Camille Lacourt	France	53.42	Q
3	6	Kosuke Hagino	Japan	53.68	Q
4	4	Ashley Delaney	Australia	53.74	Q
5	5	Xu Jiayu	China	53.84	
6	2	Bastiaan Lijesen	Netherlands	53.92	
7	1	Cheng Feiyi	China	54.20	
8	8	Darren Murray	South Africa	55.02	

=== Final ===
The final was held at 19:06.

Rank	Lane	Name	Nationality	Time	Notes
1st place, gold medalist(s)	4	Matt Grevers	United States	52.93	
2nd place, silver medalist(s)	5	David Plummer	United States	53.12	
3rd place, bronze medalist(s)	3	Jérémy Stravius	France	53.21	
4	6	Ryosuke Irie	Japan	53.29	
5	2	Camille Lacourt	France	53.51	
6	1	Ashley Delaney	Australia	53.55	
7	7	Kosuke Hagino	Japan	53.93	
8	8	Gareth Kean	New Zealand	54.25	
