= Venezuela at the 2013 World Aquatics Championships =

- Flag of Venezuela
- FINA code: VEN
- National federation: Federación Venezolana de Deportes Acuáticos
- Website: www.feveda.com.ve

in Barcelona, Spain
- Medals: Gold 0 Silver 0 Bronze 0 Total 0

World Aquatics Championships appearances
- 1973; 1975; 1978; 1982; 1986; 1991; 1994; 1998; 2001; 2003; 2005; 2007; 2009; 2011; 2013; 2015; 2017; 2019; 2022; 2023; 2024

Venezuela is competing at the 2013 World Aquatics Championships in Barcelona, Spain between 19 July and 4 August 2013.

== Diving ==
Venezuela qualified six quota places for the following diving events.

Men

Athlete	Event	Preliminaries		Semifinals		Final	
Athlete	Event	Points	Rank	Points	Rank	Points	Rank
Alfredo Colmenarez	1 m springboard	288.25	33	—		did not advance	
Jesus Liranzo	1 m springboard	285.15	34	—		did not advance	
Edickson Contreras	3 m springboard	330.45	38	did not advance			
Jesus Liranzo	3 m springboard	292.95	43	did not advance			
Robert Páez	10 m platform	367.25	20	did not advance			
Alfredo Colmenarez; Jesus Liranzo	3 m synchronized springboard	360.03	13	—		did not advance	

Women

Athlete	Event	Preliminaries		Semifinals		Final	
Athlete	Event	Points	Rank	Points	Rank	Points	Rank
María Betancourt	1 m springboard	228.80	17	—		did not advance	
María Betancourt	10 m platform	309.30	9 Q	314.65	7 Q	328.35	7
Lissette Ramírez	10 m platform	221.00	33	did not advance			

== Open water swimming ==
Venezuela qualified five quota places for the following events in open water swimming.

Athlete	Event	Time	Rank
Luis Bolanos	Men's 10 km	1:51:09.6	44
Luis Bolanos	Men's 25 km	4:50:52.7	16
Johndry Segovia	Men's 5 km	54:02.3	34
Johndry Segovia	Men's 10 km	1:49:59.7	24
Florencia Melo	Women's 5 km	1:01:32.5	31
Vicenia Navarro	Women's 10 km	1:58:38.5	24
Vicenia Navarro	Women's 25 km	5:23:31.8	16
Paola Pérez	Women's 5 km	57:51.5	27
Paola Pérez	Women's 10 km	2:00:36.8	32
Paola Pérez	Women's 25 km	5:20:31.8	13
Luis Bolanos; Johndry Segovia; Florencia Melo	Mixed team	58:59.9	17

== Swimming ==
Venezuelan swimmers achieved qualifying standards in the following events (up to a maximum of 2 swimmers in each event at the A-standard entry time, and 1 at the B-standard):

Men

Athlete	Event	Heat		Semifinal		Final	
Athlete	Event	Time	Rank	Time	Rank	Time	Rank
Carlos Claverie	200 m breaststroke	2:15.76 NR	30	did not advance			
Miguel Ferreira	50 m breaststroke	27.78	=22	did not advance			
Miguel Ferreira	100 m breaststroke	1:02.45	41	did not advance			
Alejandro Gómez	800 m freestyle	8:09.04	27	—		did not advance	
Alejandro Gómez	1500 m freestyle	15:38.78	31	—		did not advance	
Marcos Lavado	200 m butterfly	1:58.69	22	did not advance			
Cristian Quintero	100 m freestyle	49.50	18	did not advance			
Cristian Quintero	200 m freestyle	1:48.96	24	did not advance			
Cristian Quintero	400 m freestyle	3:52.03	20	—		did not advance	

Women

Athlete	Event	Heat		Semifinal		Final	
Athlete	Event	Time	Rank	Time	Rank	Time	Rank
Andreína Pinto	400 m freestyle	4:06.02	8 Q	—		4:07.14	6
Andreína Pinto	800 m freestyle	8:27.03	7 Q	—		8:37.29	8
Andreína Pinto	1500 m freestyle	16:15.99	11	—		did not advance	
Andreína Pinto	200 m butterfly	2:10.74	15 Q	2:10.11	14	did not advance	
Jeserik Pinto	50 m backstroke	29.62	34	did not advance			
Jeserik Pinto	50 m butterfly	26.94	26	did not advance			
Mercedes Toledo	50 m breaststroke	32.61	36	did not advance			

== Synchronized swimming ==
Venezuela has qualified the following synchronized swimmers.

Athlete	Event	Preliminaries		Final	
Athlete	Event	Points	Rank	Points	Rank
Greisy Gómez	Solo free routine	74.100	26	did not advance	
Greisy Gómez	Solo technical routine	75.100	22	did not advance	
Albany Avila; Karla Loaiza	Duet free routine	71.470	26	did not advance	
Albany Avila; Karla Loaiza	Duet technical routine	67.200	29	did not advance	
