= South Korea at the 2013 World Aquatics Championships =

- Flag of South Korea
- World Aquatics code: KOR
- National federation: Korean Swimming Federation
- Website: swimming.sports.or.kr

in Barcelona, Spain
- Medals: Gold 0 Silver 0 Bronze 0 Total 0

World Aquatics Championships appearances
- 1973; 1975; 1978; 1982; 1986; 1991; 1994; 1998; 2001; 2003; 2005; 2007; 2009; 2011; 2013; 2015; 2017; 2019; 2022; 2023; 2024; 2025

South Korea is competing at the 2013 World Aquatics Championships in Barcelona, Spain between 19 July and 4 August 2013.

== Diving ==
South Korea qualified six quota places for the following diving events.

Men

Athlete	Event	Preliminaries		Semifinals		Final	
Athlete	Event	Points	Rank	Points	Rank	Points	Rank
Kim Yeong-Nam	1 m springboard	276.95	36	—N/a		did not advance	
Woo Ha-Ram	1 m springboard	315.75	25	—N/a		did not advance	
Cho Kwan-Hoon	3 m springboard	337.05	35	did not advance			
Kim Yeong-Nam	3 m springboard	373.20	22	did not advance			
Kim Yeong-Nam	10 m platform	297.15	30	did not advance			
Woo Ha-Ram	10 m platform	321.90	27	did not advance			
Kim Yeong-Nam; Woo Ha-Ram	3 m synchronized springboard	378.24	10 Q	—N/a		377.34	10
Kim Yeong-Nam; Woo Ha-Ram	10 m synchronized platform	390.18	7 Q	—N/a		386.22	8

Women

Athlete	Event	Preliminaries		Semifinals		Final	
Athlete	Event	Points	Rank	Points	Rank	Points	Rank
Cho Eun-Bi	1 m springboard	221.50	24	—N/a		did not advance	
Kim Chae-Hyon	1 m springboard	215.65	27	—N/a		did not advance	
Cho Eun-Bi	3 m springboard	205.45	35	did not advance			
Kim Su-ji	3 m springboard	223.20	29	did not advance			
Cho Eun-Bi	10 m platform	245.45	29	did not advance			
Kim Su-ji	10 m platform	235.20	32	did not advance			
Cho Eun-Bi; Kim Su-ji	3 m synchronized springboard	229.74	18	—N/a		did not advance	
Cho Eun-Bi; Kim Su-ji	10 m synchronized platform	266.82	11 Q	—N/a		259.80	11

== Swimming ==
South Korean swimmers earned qualifying standards in the following events (up to a maximum of 2 swimmers in each event at the A-standard entry time, and 1 at the B-standard):

Men

Athlete	Event	Heat		Semifinal		Final	
Athlete	Event	Time	Rank	Time	Rank	Time	Rank
Chang Gyu-Cheol	100 m butterfly	54.09	34	did not advance			
Chang Gyu-Cheol	200 m butterfly	2:03.32	31	did not advance			
Choi Kyu-Woong	100 m breaststroke	1:02.58	43	did not advance			
Im Tae-Jeong	200 m backstroke	2:01.23	23	did not advance			
Im Tae-Jeong	200 m individual medley	2:03.61	36	did not advance			
Im Tae-Jeong	400 m individual medley	4:34.69	37	—N/a		did not advance	
Jang Sang-Jin	800 m freestyle	8:18.51	30	—N/a		did not advance	
Jeong Jeong-Soo	200 m freestyle	1:51.86	43	did not advance			
Jeong Jeong-Soo	400 m freestyle	3:56.68	30	—N/a		did not advance	
Ju Jang-Hun	200 m breaststroke	2:14.79	26	did not advance			
Shin Hee-Woong	50 m backstroke	25.84	22	did not advance			
Shin Hee-Woong	100 m backstroke	56.95	35	did not advance			
Shin Hyeong-Keun	50 m breaststroke	28.29	42	did not advance			
Yang Jung-Doo	50 m freestyle	22.48	22	did not advance			
Yang Jung-Doo	50 m butterfly	23.84	24	did not advance			
Chang Gyu-Cheol; Jeong Jeong-Soo; Shin Hee-Woong; Yang Jung-Doo	4×100 m freestyle relay	3:25.50	15	—N/a		did not advance	
Im Tae-Jeong; Jang Sang-Jin; Ju Jang-Hun; Jeong Jeong-Soo	4×200 m freestyle relay	7:32.83	17	—N/a		did not advance	
Choi Kyu-Woong; Chang Gyu-Cheol; Shin Hee-Woong; Yang Jung-Doo	4×100 m medley relay	3:44.08	20	—N/a		did not advance	

Women

Athlete	Event	Heat		Semifinal		Final	
Athlete	Event	Time	Rank	Time	Rank	Time	Rank
An Se-Hyeon	200 m butterfly	2:13.26	19	did not advance			
Back Su-Yeon	100 m breaststroke	1:09.11	25	did not advance			
Back Su-Yeon	200 m breaststroke	2:27.47	13 Q	2:25.61	10	did not advance	
Han Na-Kyeong	1500 m freestyle	16:55.46	20	—N/a		did not advance	
Hwang Seo-Jin	50 m butterfly	27.22	30	did not advance			
Im Da-Sol	200 m backstroke	2:14.07	23	did not advance			
Kim Go-Eun	50 m breaststroke	31.95	28	did not advance			
Kim Ji-Hyun	50 m backstroke	29.18	29	did not advance			
Kim Ji-Hyun	100 m backstroke	1:04.66	37	did not advance			
Park Jin-Young	100 m butterfly	1:00.78	31	did not advance			
Yang Ji-Won	200 m breaststroke	2:27.78	14 Q	2:27.67	14	did not advance	
An Se-Hyeon; Han Na-Kyeong; Hwang Seo-Jin; Kim Ji-Hyun	4×100 m freestyle relay	3:55.67	15	—N/a		did not advance	
An Se-Hyeon; Han Na-Kyeong; Hwang Seo-Jin; Kim Ji-Hyun	4×200 m freestyle relay	8:32.98	13	—N/a		did not advance	
Back Su-Yeon; Hwang Seo-Jin; Kim Ji-Hyun; Park Jin-Young	4×100 m medley relay	4:10.75	16	—N/a		did not advance	

== Synchronized swimming ==
South Korea has qualified twelve synchronized swimmers.

Athlete	Event	Preliminaries		Final	
Athlete	Event	Points	Rank	Points	Rank
Gu Se-Ul	Solo free routine	75.830	25	did not advance	
Lim Hyun-Ji	Solo technical routine	69.200	30	did not advance	
Jung Young-Hee; Kong Do-Yeon	Duet free routine	72.580	23	did not advance	
Gu Se-Ul; Kim Ka-Young	Duet technical routine	70.800	24	did not advance	
