= Swimming at the 2013 World Aquatics Championships – Men's 400 metre freestyle =

Men's 400 metre freestyle at the 2013 World Aquatics Championships
- Venue: Palau Sant Jordi
- Dates: July 28, 2013 (heats & final)
- Competitors: 48 from 43 nations
- Winning time: 3:41.59

Medalists
| gold medal | Sun Yang | China |
| silver medal | Kosuke Hagino | Japan |
| bronze medal | Connor Jaeger | United States |

Barcelona Palau San Jordi

The men's 400 metre freestyle event in swimming at the 2013 World Aquatics Championships took place on 28 July at the Palau Sant Jordi in Barcelona, Spain.

== Records ==
Prior to this competition, the existing world and championship records were:

| World record | Paul Biedermann (GER) | 3:40.07 | Rome, Italy | 26 July 2009 |
| Competition record | Paul Biedermann (GER) | 3:40.07 | Rome, Italy | 26 July 2009 |

== Results ==
=== Heats ===
The heats were held at 10:16.

| Rank | Heat | Lane | Name | Nationality | Time | Notes |
|---|---|---|---|---|---|---|
| 1 | 5 | 4 | Sun Yang | China | 3:44.67 | Q |
| 2 | 5 | 6 | Ryan Cochrane | Canada | 3:45.74 | Q |
| 3 | 5 | 5 | Jordan Harrison | Australia | 3:46.85 | Q |
| 4 | 3 | 4 | Kosuke Hagino | Japan | 3:46.92 | Q |
| 5 | 5 | 7 | Devon Brown | South Africa | 3:47.17 | Q |
| 6 | 3 | 5 | Hao Yun | China | 3:47.49 | Q |
| 7 | 4 | 5 | Connor Jaeger | United States | 3:47.83 | Q |
| 8 | 3 | 6 | James Guy | Great Britain | 3:47.86 | Q |
| 9 | 3 | 3 | Robbie Renwick | Great Britain | 3:47.99 | |
| 10 | 4 | 6 | Matthew Stanley | New Zealand | 3:48.25 | |
| 11 | 4 | 7 | Ahmed Mathlouthi | Tunisia | 3:49.45 | |
| 12 | 4 | 4 | David McKeon | Australia | 3:49.51 | |
| 13 | 5 | 3 | Matt McLean | United States | 3:49.74 | |
| 14 | 4 | 2 | Gabriele Detti | Italy | 3:49.78 | |
| 15 | 4 | 1 | Filip Zaborowski | Poland | 3:50.22 | |
| 16 | 4 | 3 | Gergő Kis | Hungary | 3:50.87 | |
| 17 | 3 | 1 | Matias Koski | Finland | 3:51.04 | |
| 18 | 5 | 2 | Velimir Stjepanović | Serbia | 3:51.90 | |
| 19 | 5 | 0 | David Brandl | Austria | 3:51.98 | |
| 20 | 3 | 7 | Cristian Quintero | Venezuela | 3:52.03 | |
| 21 | 2 | 3 | Richárd Nagy | Slovakia | 3:53.10 | |
| 22 | 3 | 2 | Samuel Pizzetti | Italy | 3:53.26 | |
| 23 | 5 | 8 | Ward Bauwens | Belgium | 3:53.60 | |
| 24 | 2 | 5 | Marwan Ismail | Egypt | 3:53.80 | NR |
| 25 | 5 | 1 | Serhiy Frolov | Ukraine | 3:53.92 | |
| 26 | 1 | 8 | Martin Grodzki | Germany | 3:54.47 | |
| 27 | 2 | 6 | Anton Sveinn McKee | Iceland | 3:54.67 | NR |
| 28 | 2 | 1 | Welliam Maksi | Syria | 3:56.29 | |
| 28 | 2 | 2 | Povilas Strazdas | Lithuania | 3:56.29 | |
| 30 | 4 | 9 | Jeong Jeong-Soo | South Korea | 3:56.68 | |
| 31 | 5 | 9 | Arturo Pérez Vertti | Mexico | 3:57.28 | |
| 32 | 3 | 8 | Damien Joly | France | 3:57.32 | |
| 33 | 2 | 4 | Nezir Karap | Turkey | 3:57.37 | |
| 34 | 4 | 8 | Dominik Meichtry | Switzerland | 3:57.65 | |
| 35 | 3 | 0 | Ihar Boki | Belarus | 3:58.27 | |
| 36 | 4 | 0 | Martin Naidich | Argentina | 3:58.92 | |
| 37 | 3 | 9 | Kevin Yeap | Malaysia | 3:59.08 | |
| 38 | 1 | 4 | Nicholas Schwab | Dominican Republic | 3:59.29 | NR |
| 39 | 2 | 7 | Marcelo Acosta Jiménez | El Salvador | 4:02.21 | |
| 40 | 2 | 0 | Yeziel Morales | Puerto Rico | 4:02.28 | |
| 41 | 2 | 9 | Matthew Lowe | Bahamas | 4:03.01 | |
| 42 | 1 | 5 | Ahmed Gebrel | Palestine | 4:07.70 | |
| 43 | 2 | 8 | Phạm Thành Nguyện | Vietnam | 4:13.91 | |
| 44 | 1 | 3 | Guillermo Lopéz | Nicaragua | 4:20.85 | |
| 45 | 1 | 7 | Sovijja Pou | Cambodia | 4:22.67 | |
| 46 | 1 | 6 | Klavio Meca | Albania | 4:27.25 | |
| 47 | 1 | 1 | Brandon Schuster | Samoa | 4:29.60 | |
| 48 | 1 | 2 | Khalid Baba | Bahrain | 4:29.94 | |

=== Final ===
The final was held at 18:13.

| Rank | Lane | Name | Nationality | Time | Notes |
|---|---|---|---|---|---|
| 1st place, gold medalist(s) | 4 | Sun Yang | China | 3:41.59 | |
| 2nd place, silver medalist(s) | 6 | Kosuke Hagino | Japan | 3:44.82 | |
| 3rd place, bronze medalist(s) | 1 | Connor Jaeger | United States | 3:44.85 | |
| 4 | 5 | Ryan Cochrane | Canada | 3:45.02 | |
| 5 | 8 | James Guy | Great Britain | 3:47.96 | |
| 6 | 2 | Devon Brown | South Africa | 3:48.40 | |
| 6 | 3 | Jordan Harrison | Australia | 3:48.40 | |
| 8 | 7 | Hao Yun | China | 3:48.88 | |
