= Diving at the 2013 World Aquatics Championships – Women's synchronized 3 metre springboard =

Women's synchronized 3 metre springboard at the 2013 World Aquatics Championships
- Dates: 20 July
- Competitors: 40 from 20 nations
- Winning points: 338.40

Medalists
gold medal	Wu Minxia; Shi Tingmao	China
silver medal	Tania Cagnotto; Francesca Dallapé	Italy
bronze medal	Jennifer Abel; Pamela Ware	Canada

The women's synchronized 3 metre springboard competition at 2013 World Aquatics Championships was held on July 20 with the preliminary round in the morning and the final in the evening session.

== Results ==
The preliminary round was held at 10:00 and the final at 17:30.

Green denotes finalists

Rank	Diver	Nationality	Preliminary		Final	
Rank	Diver	Nationality	Points	Rank	Points	Rank
1st place, gold medalist(s)	Wu Minxia; Shi Tingmao	China	334.20	1	338.40	1
2nd place, silver medalist(s)	Tania Cagnotto; Francesca Dallapè	Italy	302.40	2	307.80	2
3rd place, bronze medalist(s)	Jennifer Abel; Pamela Ware	Canada	300.78	3	292.08	3
4	Laura Sánchez; Arantxa Chávez	Mexico	264.00	9	290.70	4
5	Pandelela Rinong; Cheong Jun Hoong	Malaysia	283.50	5	289.20	5
6	Rebecca Gallantree; Alicia Blagg	Great Britain	281.01	6	284.73	6
7	Samantha Pickens; Amanda Burke	United States	265.92	8	284.64	7
8	Sherilyse Gowlett; Maddison Keeney	Australia	284.07	4	279.03	8
9	Diana Chaplieva; Daria Govor	Russia	263.10	10	278.40	9
10	Hanna Pysmenska; Olena Fedorova	Ukraine	274.50	7	270.90	10
11	Mai Nakagawa; Sayaka Shibusawa	Japan	262.50	11	250.50	11
12	Sharon Chan; Leung Sze Man	Hong Kong	251.97	12	244.71	12
13	Tina Punzel; Felicitas Lenz	Germany	250.80	13		
14	Inge Jansen; Celine van Duijn	Netherlands	250.50	14		
15	Flóra Gondos; Zsófia Reisinger	Hungary	241.89	15		
16	Nicole Gillis; Julia Vincent	South Africa	241.38	16		
17	Choi Sut Ian; Lo I Teng	Macau	234.30	17		
18	Cho Eun-Bi; Kim Su-ji	South Korea	229.74	18		
19	Marcela Marić; Maja Borić	Croatia	227.07	19		
20	Sari Ambarwati Suprihatin; Eka Purnama Indah	Indonesia	208.47	20		
