= Swimming at the 2013 World Aquatics Championships – Women's 200 metre breaststroke =

Women's 200 metre breaststroke at the 2013 World Aquatics Championships
- Venue: Palau Sant Jordi
- Date: August 1, 2013 (heats & semifinals); August 2, 2013 (final)
- Competitors: 37 from 31 nations
- Winning time: 2:19.41

Medalists
gold medal	Yuliya Yefimova	Russia
silver medal	Rikke Møller Pedersen	Denmark
bronze medal	Micah Lawrence	United States

Barcelona Palau San Jordi

The women's 200 metre breaststroke event in swimming at the 2013 World Aquatics Championships took place on 1–2 August at the Palau Sant Jordi in Barcelona, Spain.

== Records ==
Prior to this competition, the existing world and championship records were:

World record	Rebecca Soni (USA)	2:19.59	London, Great Britain	2 August 2012
Competition record	Annamay Pierse (CAN)	2:20.12	Rome, Italy	30 July 2009

The following new records were set during this competition.

Date	Event	Name	Nationality	Time	Record
1 August	Semifinal 1	Rikke Møller Pedersen	Denmark	2:19.11	WR

== Results ==
=== Heats ===
The heats were held at 10:37.

Rank	Heat	Lane	Name	Nationality	Time	Notes
1	2	5	Micah Lawrence	United States	2:21.74	Q
2	4	4	Rikke Møller Pedersen	Denmark	2:22.20	Q
3	2	4	Yuliya Yefimova	Russia	2:23.13	Q
4	4	5	Rie Kaneto	Japan	2:23.91	Q
5	2	6	Marina García	Spain	2:24.21	Q
6	3	6	Viktoriya Solnceva	Ukraine	2:24.65	Q, NR
7	3	2	Shi Jinglin	China	2:25.73	Q
8	3	5	Martha McCabe	Canada	2:25.91	Q
9	3	7	Jessica Vall	Spain	2:26.62	Q
10	4	3	Breeja Larson	United States	2:26.90	Q
11	3	4	Satomi Suzuki	Japan	2:27.31	Q
12	3	3	Sally Foster	Australia	2:27.41	Q
13	2	7	Back Su-Yeon	South Korea	2:27.47	Q
14	2	3	Yang Ji-Won	South Korea	2:27.78	Q
15	3	8	Jenna Laukkanen	Finland	2:28.04	Q, NR
16	4	7	Hrafnhildur Lúthersdóttir	Iceland	2:28.12	Q
17	4	8	Hannah Miley	Great Britain	2:28.15	
18	4	1	Martina Moravčíková	Czech Republic	2:28.35	NR
19	4	6	Joline Hostman	Sweden	2:28.41	
20	2	8	Fiona Doyle	Ireland	2:30.49	NR
21	4	2	Tera van Beilen	Canada	2:31.34	
22	2	1	Alia Atkinson	Jamaica	2:31.49	
23	1	5	Siow Yi Ting	Malaysia	2:31.99	
24	1	4	Samantha Yeo	Singapore	2:32.55	
25	2	9	Esther González	Mexico	2:32.82	
26	4	9	Julia Sebastián	Argentina	2:32.88	
27	3	9	Alona Ribakova	Latvia	2:33.07	
28	1	6	Maria Romanjuk	Estonia	2:33.48	NR
29	2	0	Raminta Dvariškytė	Lithuania	2:33.84	
30	2	2	Hanna Dzerkal	Ukraine	2:34.06	
31	1	3	Tara-Lynn Nicholas	South Africa	2:34.41	
32	4	0	Ioana Alexandra Popa	Romania	2:34.66	
33	1	2	Daniela Lindemeier	Namibia	2:37.47	NR
34	1	7	Irene Chrysostomou	Cyprus	2:39.65	
35	1	8	Barbara Vali-Skelton	Papua New Guinea	2:47.99	
36	1	0	Anum Bandey	Pakistan	2:55.65	NR
	3	0	Lisa Zaiser	Austria		DSQ
	1	1	Ngô Thị Ngọc Quỳnh	Vietnam		DNS
	3	1	Caroline Ruhnau	Germany		DNS

=== Semifinals ===
The semifinals were held at 18:20.

==== Semifinal 1 ====
Rank	Lane	Name	Nationality	Time	Notes
1	4	Rikke Møller Pedersen	Denmark	2:19.11	Q, WR
2	5	Rie Kaneto	Japan	2:23.28	Q
3	7	Sally Foster	Australia	2:24.14	Q
4	3	Viktoriya Solnceva	Ukraine	2:24.19	Q, NR
5	6	Martha McCabe	Canada	2:24.68	Q
6	2	Breeja Larson	United States	2:26.22	
7	1	Yang Ji-Won	South Korea	2:27.67	
8	8	Hrafnhildur Lúthersdóttir	Iceland	2:29.30	

==== Semifinal 2 ====
Rank	Lane	Name	Nationality	Time	Notes
1	5	Yuliya Yefimova	Russia	2:19.85	Q, NR
2	3	Marina García	Spain	2:22.88	Q, NR
3	4	Micah Lawrence	United States	2:23.23	Q
4	6	Shi Jinglin	China	2:25.52	
5	1	Back Su-Yeon	South Korea	2:25.61	
6	7	Satomi Suzuki	Japan	2:25.77	
7	2	Jessica Vall	Spain	2:27.00	
8	8	Jenna Laukkanen	Finland	2:29.86	

=== Final ===
The final was held at 18:55.

Rank	Lane	Name	Nationality	Time	Notes
1st place, gold medalist(s)	5	Yuliya Yefimova	Russia	2:19.41	NR
2nd place, silver medalist(s)	4	Rikke Møller Pedersen	Denmark	2:20.08	
3rd place, bronze medalist(s)	6	Micah Lawrence	United States	2:22.37	
4	2	Rie Kaneto	Japan	2:22.96	
5	1	Viktoriya Solnceva	Ukraine	2:23.01	NR
6	3	Marina García	Spain	2:23.55	
7	7	Sally Foster	Australia	2:24.01	
8	8	Martha McCabe	Canada	2:25.21	
