= Myanmar at the 2013 World Aquatics Championships =

- Flag of Myanmar
- FINA code: MYA
- National federation: Myanmar Swimming Federation

in Barcelona, Spain
- Competitors: 3 in 1 sports
- Medals: Gold 0 Silver 0 Bronze 0 Total 0

World Aquatics Championships appearances
- 2001; 2003; 2005; 2007; 2009; 2011; 2013; 2015; 2017–2023; 2024

Myanmar competed at the 2013 World Aquatics Championships in Barcelona, Spain between 19 July and 4 August 2013.

== Swimming ==
Burmese swimmers achieved qualifying standards in the following events (up to a maximum of 2 swimmers in each event at the A-standard entry time, and 1 at the B-standard):

Men

Athlete	Event	Heat		Semifinal		Final	
Athlete	Event	Time	Rank	Time	Rank	Time	Rank
Lin Tin Kyaw	50 m breaststroke	33.89	71	did not advance			
Lin Tin Kyaw	100 m breaststroke	1:18.24	74	did not advance			

Women

Athlete	Event	Heat		Semifinal		Final	
Athlete	Event	Time	Rank	Time	Rank	Time	Rank
San Khant Khant Su	400 m freestyle	4:54.89	35	—		did not advance	
San Khant Khant Su	800 m freestyle	10:03.20	36	—		did not advance	
San Su Moe Theint	50 m butterfly	30.58	51	did not advance			
San Su Moe Theint	100 m butterfly	1:10.62	52	did not advance			
