= Swimming at the 2013 World Aquatics Championships – Women's 50 metre backstroke =

Women's 50 metre backstroke at the 2013 World Aquatics Championships
- Venue: Palau Sant Jordi
- Dates: July 31, 2013 (heats & semifinals); August 1, 2013 (final)
- Competitors: 51 from 45 nations
- Winning time: 27.29

Medalists
gold medal	Zhao Jing	China
silver medal	Fu Yuanhui	China
bronze medal	Aya Terakawa	Japan

Swimming at the 2013 World Aquatics Championships – Women's 50 metre backstroke

The women's 50 metre backstroke event in swimming at the 2013 World Aquatics Championships took place on 31 July and 1 August at the Palau Sant Jordi in Barcelona, Spain.

== Records ==
Prior to this competition, the existing world and championship records were:

World record	Zhao Jing (CHN)	27.06	Rome, Italy	30 July 2009
Competition record	Zhao Jing (CHN)	27.06	Rome, Italy	30 July 2009

== Results ==
=== Heats ===
The heats were held at 10:00.

Rank	Heat	Lane	Name	Nationality	Time	Notes
1	6	4	Fu Yuanhui	China	27.55	Q
2	6	5	Zhao Jing	China	27.81	Q
3	5	4	Aya Terakawa	Japan	28.05	Q
4	4	5	Mercedes Peris	Spain	28.07	Q
5	5	5	Etiene Medeiros	Brazil	28.16	Q
6	4	4	Rachel Bootsma	United States	28.28	Q
7	6	3	Georgia Davies	Great Britain	28.35	Q
7	6	6	Lauren Quigley	Great Britain	28.35	Q
9	5	2	Duane Da Rocha	Spain	28.37	Q
9	5	6	Aleksandra Urbanczyk	Poland	28.37	Q
11	6	2	Simona Baumrtová	Czech Republic	28.38	Q, NR
12	4	9	Stephanie Au	Hong Kong	28.39	Q, NR
13	5	3	Missy Franklin	United States	28.44	Q, WD
13	6	8	Sanja Jovanović	Croatia	28.44	Q
15	4	3	Emily Seebohm	Australia	28.48	Q
16	4	6	Sinead Russell	Canada	28.60	Q
17	4	8	Ingibjörg Jónsdóttir	Iceland	28.62	NR
17	5	9	Anni Alitalo	Finland	28.62	Q, NR
19	4	7	Klaudia Nazieblo	Poland	28.65	
20	3	7	Amit Ivry	Israel	28.75	NR
21	6	7	Belinda Hocking	Australia	28.80	
22	4	2	Theodora Drakou	Greece	28.81	
22	6	1	Daria Ustinova	Russia	28.81	
24	6	9	Tao Li	Singapore	28.90	
25	4	1	Carolina Colorado Henao	Colombia	29.08	
25	6	0	Jessica Ashley-Cooper	South Africa	29.08	
27	5	0	Kimberly Buys	Belgium	29.16	
28	3	3	Fernanda González	Mexico	29.17	
29	5	8	Kim Ji-Hyun	South Korea	29.18	
30	4	0	Yekaterina Rudenko	Kazakhstan	29.19	
31	5	1	Magdalena Kuras	Sweden	29.39	
32	3	6	Gisela Morales	Guatemala	29.42	
33	5	7	Selina Hocke	Germany	29.50	
34	3	4	Jeserik Pinto	Venezuela	29.62	
35	3	1	Ekaterina Avramova	Bulgaria	29.75	
36	3	9	Barbara Caraballo	Puerto Rico	29.80	NR
37	3	2	Yulduz Kuchkarova	Uzbekistan	29.84	
38	3	5	Hazal Sarıkaya	Turkey	30.15	
39	2	4	Caroline Puamau	Fiji	30.36	
40	3	0	Birita Debes	Faroe Islands	30.57	NR
41	3	8	Heather Arseth	Mauritius	30.61	
42	2	5	Siona Huxley	Saint Lucia	31.33	
43	2	2	Faye Sultan	Kuwait	31.36	
44	2	6	Kuan Weng I	Macau	31.64	
45	2	8	Evelina Afoa	Samoa	31.67	
46	2	3	Nadeera Jayasekera	Sri Lanka	32.33	
47	2	1	Caylee Watson	U.S. Virgin Islands	32.38	
48	2	0	Nur Hamizah Ahmad	Brunei	33.85	
49	1	5	Colleen Furgeson	Marshall Islands	34.48	
50	1	4	Osisang Chilton	Palau	34.60	
51	2	9	Khadidiatou Dieng	Senegal	34.90	
	1	3	Meseret Amare	Ethiopia		DNS
	2	7	Khahliso Mpeta	Lesotho		DNS

=== Semifinals ===
The semifinals were held at 18:12.

==== Semifinal 1 ====
Rank	Lane	Name	Nationality	Time	Notes
1	5	Mercedes Peris	Spain	27.71	Q, NR
2	4	Zhao Jing	China	27.87	Q
3	3	Rachel Bootsma	United States	27.93	Q
4	6	Lauren Quigley	Great Britain	28.02	Q
5	2	Duane Da Rocha	Spain	28.25	
6	1	Emily Seebohm	Australia	28.29	
7	7	Stephanie Au	Hong Kong	28.33	NR
8	8	Anni Alitalo	Finland	28.61	NR

==== Semifinal 2 ====
Rank	Lane	Name	Nationality	Time	Notes
1	4	Fu Yuanhui	China	27.40	Q
2	5	Aya Terakawa	Japan	27.70	Q, NR
3	3	Etiene Medeiros	Brazil	27.89	Q
4	6	Georgia Davies	Great Britain	28.05	Q
5	7	Simona Baumrtová	Czech Republic	28.20	NR
6	2	Aleksandra Urbańczyk	Poland	28.25	
7	8	Sinead Russell	Canada	28.35	
8	1	Sanja Jovanović	Croatia	28.60	

=== Final ===
The final was held at 19:14.

Rank	Lane	Name	Nationality	Time	Notes
1st place, gold medalist(s)	6	Zhao Jing	China	27.29	
2nd place, silver medalist(s)	4	Fu Yuanhui	China	27.39	
3rd place, bronze medalist(s)	5	Aya Terakawa	Japan	27.53	NR
4	2	Etiene Medeiros	Brazil	27.83	
5	3	Mercedes Peris	Spain	27.93	
6	8	Georgia Davies	Great Britain	27.96	
7	7	Rachel Bootsma	United States	28.05	
8	1	Lauren Quigley	Great Britain	28.33	
