= Konstantinos Galanidis =

Greek water polo player

Personal information
- Nationality: Greek
- Born: 1 September 1990 (age 36) Chania, Greece
- Height: 202 cm (80 in)

Sport
- Sport: Water polo
- Handedness: Right
- Position: Goalkeeper
National team
- Years: Team
- ?: Greece
Medal record
Men's water polo
Representing Greece
Olympic Games
Silver medal – second place	2020 Tokyo	Team
- Updated on 18 August 2016

Konstantinos Galanidis (born 1 September 1990) is a male water polo goalkeeper from Greece. He was part of the Greece men's national water polo team at the 2013 World Aquatics Championships in Barcelona, Spain, where they finished in 6th place. At club level, he played for Olympiacos.

== See also ==
- Greece at the 2013 World Aquatics Championships
