= Swimming at the 2013 World Aquatics Championships – Women's 50 metre butterfly =

Women's 50 metre butterfly at the 2013 World Aquatics Championships
- Venue: Palau Sant Jordi
- Dates: August 2, 2013 (heats & semifinals); August 3, 2013 (final)
- Competitors: 60 from 53 nations
- Winning time: 25.24

Medalists
gold medal	Jeanette Ottesen	Denmark
silver medal	Lu Ying	China
bronze medal	Ranomi Kromowidjojo	Netherlands

Barcelona Palau San Jordi

The women's 50 metre butterfly event in swimming at the 2013 World Aquatics Championships took place on 2–3 August at the Palau Sant Jordi in Barcelona, Spain.

== Records ==
Prior to this competition, the existing world and championship records were:

World record	Therese Alshammar (SWE)	25.07	Rome, Italy	1 August 2009
Competition record	Therese Alshammar (SWE)	25.07	Rome, Italy	1 August 2009

== Results ==
=== Heats ===
The heats were held at 10:24.

Rank	Heat	Lane	Name	Nationality	Time	Notes
1	6	5	Francesca Halsall	Great Britain	25.69	Q
1	7	4	Jeanette Ottesen	Denmark	25.69	Q
3	7	6	Lu Ying	China	25.82	Q
4	5	8	Brittany Elmslie	Australia	26.03	Q
5	5	5	Christine Magnuson	United States	26.12	Q
6	7	5	Inge Dekker	Netherlands	26.15	Q
7	5	3	Dana Vollmer	United States	26.29	Q
8	5	4	Ranomi Kromowidjojo	Netherlands	26.31	Q
9	7	7	Silvia di Pietro	Italy	26.31	Q
10	7	3	Kimberly Buys	Belgium	26.35	Q
11	6	6	Sophia Batchelor	New Zealand	26.45	Q
11	7	0	Farida Osman	Egypt	26.45	Q
13	6	9	Tao Li	Singapore	26.48	Q
14	5	6	Svetlana Chimrova	Russia	26.51	Q
15	7	8	Sandrine Mainville	Canada	26.52	Q
16	6	3	Mélanie Henique	France	26.54	QSO
16	6	8	Alexandra Wenk	Germany	26.54	QSO
18	6	4	Alicia Coutts	Australia	26.56	
19	5	7	Ilaria Bianchi	Italy	26.63	
20	7	2	Daynara de Paula	Brazil	26.68	
21	6	7	Louise Hansson	Sweden	26.71	
22	6	1	Anna Dowgiert	Poland	26.72	
23	7	9	Elmira Aigaliyeva	Kazakhstan	26.76	
24	6	2	Ingvild Snildal	Norway	26.87	
25	5	2	Noemie Thomas	Canada	26.88	
26	4	8	Jeserik Pinto	Venezuela	26.94	NR
27	6	0	Siobhan-Marie O'Connor	Great Britain	26.98	
28	5	0	Amit Ivry	Israel	27.04	
29	4	3	Carolina Colorado Henao	Colombia	27.18	
30	4	5	Hwang Seo-Jin	South Korea	27.22	
31	4	2	Katarína Listopadová	Slovakia	27.32	
32	5	9	Trudi Maree	South Africa	27.40	
33	4	1	Lisa Zaiser	Austria	27.41	
34	5	1	Kristel Vourna	Greece	27.49	
35	4	6	İris Rosenberger	Turkey	27.66	
35	4	7	Gabriela Ņikitina	Latvia	27.66	
35	4	9	Chan Kin Lok	Hong Kong	27.66	
38	7	1	Marie Wattel	France	27.77	
39	4	0	Rita Medrano	Mexico	28.20	
40	3	4	Marie Meza	Costa Rica	28.43	
41	3	6	Poula Øssursdóttir Mohr	Faroe Islands	28.52	
42	3	3	Dorian McMenemy	Dominican Republic	28.53	
43	3	5	María López Nery	Paraguay	28.84	
44	4	4	Maria José Ribera	Bolivia	29.23	
45	1	3	Ophelia Swayne	Ghana	29.60	
46	3	2	Dalia Torrez Zamora	Nicaragua	29.62	
47	2	5	Tegan McCarthy	Papua New Guinea	30.17	
48	3	8	Mira Shami	Jordan	30.42	
49	3	0	Felicity Passon	Seychelles	30.46	
50	3	1	Emily Mueti	Kenya	30.55	
51	2	3	San Su Moe Theint	Myanmar	30.58	
52	3	9	Irene Prescott	Tonga	30.87	
53	2	6	Deandra van der Colff	Botswana	31.96	
54	3	7	Oreoluwa Cherebin	Grenada	32.23	
55	2	4	Afsana Ismayilova	Azerbaijan	32.29	
56	2	1	Johanna Umurungi	Rwanda	32.35	
57	2	8	Osisang Chilton	Palau	33.92	
58	2	7	Shreya Dhital	Nepal	34.01	
59	2	2	Angel de Jesus	Northern Mariana Islands	34.82	
60	1	4	Danisha Paul	Micronesia	38.39	
	1	5	Emilia Pikkarainen	Finland		DNS

==== Swim-off ====
The swim-off was held at 11:29.

Rank	Lane	Name	Nationality	Time	Notes
1	4	Mélanie Henique	France	25.94	Q
2	8	Alexandra Wenk	Germany	26.78	

=== Semifinals ===
The semifinals were held at 19:15.

==== Semifinal 1 ====
Rank	Lane	Name	Nationality	Time	Notes
1	4	Jeanette Ottesen	Denmark	25.50	Q
2	6	Ranomi Kromowidjojo	Netherlands	25.68	Q
3	8	Mélanie Henique	France	25.95	Q
4	3	Inge Dekker	Netherlands	26.11	Q
5	7	Farida Osman	Egypt	26.12	Q, AF
6	5	Brittany Elmslie	Australia	26.13	
7	1	Svetlana Chimrova	Russia	26.47	
8	2	Kimberly Buys	Belgium	26.48	

==== Semifinal 2 ====
Rank	Lane	Name	Nationality	Time	Notes
1	4	Francesca Halsall	Great Britain	25.90	Q
2	6	Dana Vollmer	United States	26.06	Q
3	5	Lu Ying	China	26.12	Q
4	3	Christine Magnuson	United States	26.19	
5	7	Sophia Batchelor	New Zealand	26.34	
6	2	Silvia di Pietro	Italy	26.35	
7	1	Tao Li	Singapore	26.47	
8	8	Sandrine Mainville	Canada	26.59	

=== Final ===
The final was held at 18:02.

Rank	Lane	Name	Nationality	Time	Notes
1st place, gold medalist(s)	4	Jeanette Ottesen	Denmark	25.24	
2nd place, silver medalist(s)	8	Lu Ying	China	25.42	AS
3rd place, bronze medalist(s)	5	Ranomi Kromowidjojo	Netherlands	25.53	
4	3	Francesca Halsall	Great Britain	25.70	
5	7	Inge Dekker	Netherlands	25.83	
6	6	Mélanie Henique	France	25.96	
7	1	Farida Osman	Egypt	26.17	
8	2	Dana Vollmer	United States	26.46	
