= Swimming at the 2013 World Aquatics Championships – Men's 200 metre breaststroke =

Men's 200 metre breaststroke at the 2013 World Aquatics Championships
- Venue: Palau Sant Jordi
- Dates: August 1, 2013 (heats & semifinals); August 2, 2013 (final)
- Competitors: 43 from 36 nations
- Winning time: 2:07.23 CR

Medalists
| gold medal | Dániel Gyurta | Hungary |
| silver medal | Marco Koch | Germany |
| bronze medal | Matti Mattsson | Finland |

Barcelona Palau San Jordi

The men's 200 metre breaststroke event in swimming at the 2013 World Aquatics Championships took place on 1–2 August at the Palau Sant Jordi in Barcelona, Spain.

== Records ==
Prior to this competition, the existing world and championship records were:

| World record | Akihiro Yamaguchi (JPN) | 2:07.01 | Gifu, Japan | 15 September 2012 |
| Competition record | Christian Sprenger (AUS) | 2:07.31 | Rome, Italy | 30 July 2009 |

The following new records were set during this competition.

| Date | Event | Name | Nationality | Time | Record |
|---|---|---|---|---|---|
| 2 August | Final | Dániel Gyurta | Hungary | 2:07.23 | CR |

== Results ==
=== Heats ===
The heats were held at 10:54.

| Rank | Heat | Lane | Name | Nationality | Time | Notes |
|---|---|---|---|---|---|---|
| 1 | 5 | 2 | Marco Koch | Germany | 2:09.39 | Q |
| 2 | 3 | 5 | Andrew Willis | Great Britain | 2:09.91 | Q |
| 3 | 5 | 4 | Dániel Gyurta | Hungary | 2:09.94 | Q |
| 4 | 3 | 7 | Matti Mattsson | Finland | 2:10.16 | Q, NR |
| 5 | 3 | 4 | Akihiro Yamaguchi | Japan | 2:10.17 | Q |
| 6 | 5 | 5 | Ryo Tateishi | Japan | 2:10.41 | Q |
| 7 | 3 | 3 | Giedrius Titenis | Lithuania | 2:10.70 | Q |
| 8 | 5 | 3 | Vyacheslav Sinkevich | Russia | 2:10.82 | Q |
| 9 | 3 | 6 | Laurent Carnol | Luxembourg | 2:10.94 | Q |
| 10 | 4 | 8 | Tomáš Klobučník | Slovakia | 2:11.00 | Q, NR |
| 11 | 4 | 5 | Kevin Cordes | United States | 2:11.40 | Q |
| 12 | 3 | 2 | Marat Amaltdinov | Russia | 2:11.41 | Q |
| 13 | 4 | 3 | Christian vom Lehn | Germany | 2:11.45 | Q |
| 14 | 4 | 4 | Michael Jamieson | Great Britain | 2:11.47 | Q |
| 15 | 5 | 6 | B.J. Johnson | United States | 2:11.64 | Q |
| 16 | 5 | 7 | Panagiotis Samilidis | Greece | 2:11.71 | Q |
| 17 | 4 | 2 | Mao Feilian | China | 2:11.81 | |
| 18 | 4 | 7 | Luca Pizzini | Italy | 2:11.93 | |
| 19 | 5 | 1 | Mikolaj Machnik | Poland | 2:11.98 | |
| 20 | 3 | 1 | Sławomir Kuczko | Poland | 2:12.21 | |
| 21 | 5 | 8 | Dimitrios Koulouris | Greece | 2:12.87 | |
| 22 | 4 | 6 | Glenn Snyders | New Zealand | 2:13.10 | |
| 23 | 2 | 3 | Carlos Almeida | Portugal | 2:13.21 | NR |
| 24 | 3 | 0 | Ashton Baumann | Canada | 2:13.46 | |
| 25 | 2 | 8 | Dmitriy Balandin | Kazakhstan | 2:13.53 | |
| 26 | 5 | 0 | Jorge Murillo | Colombia | 2:14.06 | |
| 27 | 3 | 8 | Ju Jang-Hun | South Korea | 2:14.79 | |
| 28 | 2 | 6 | Gal Nevo | Israel | 2:14.94 | |
| 29 | 2 | 1 | Anton Sveinn McKee | Iceland | 2:15.12 | |
| 30 | 2 | 5 | Carlos Claverie | Venezuela | 2:15.76 | NR |
| 31 | 4 | 1 | Ihor Borysyk | Ukraine | 2:15.84 | |
| 32 | 2 | 4 | Sandeep Sejwal | India | 2:16.05 | |
| 33 | 2 | 2 | Jakub Maly | Austria | 2:16.12 | |
| 34 | 4 | 9 | Pavel Kapylou | Belarus | 2:16.68 | |
| 35 | 4 | 0 | Christian Schurr Voight | Mexico | 2:17.62 | |
| 36 | 2 | 7 | Eladio Carrión | Puerto Rico | 2:17.82 | |
| 37 | 3 | 9 | Irakli Bolkvadze | Georgia | 2:18.23 | |
| 38 | 2 | 0 | Joshua Hall | Philippines | 2:19.16 | |
| 39 | 5 | 9 | Nuttapong Ketin | Thailand | 2:19.71 | |
| 40 | 2 | 9 | Damir Davletbaev | Kyrgyzstan | 2:25.73 | |
| 41 | 1 | 4 | Eli Ebenezer Wong | Northern Mariana Islands | 2:23.75 | |
| 42 | 1 | 5 | Alexandros Axiotis | Zambia | 2:34.43 | |
| 43 | 1 | 3 | Ashraf Hassan | Maldives | 2:55.19 | |

=== Semifinals ===
The semifinals were held at 18:54.

==== Semifinal 1 ====
| Rank | Lane | Name | Nationality | Time | Notes |
|---|---|---|---|---|---|
| 1 | 4 | Andrew Willis | Great Britain | 2:09.11 | Q |
| 2 | 6 | Vyacheslav Sinkevich | Russia | 2:09.47 | Q |
| 3 | 1 | Michael Jamieson | Great Britain | 2:09.62 | Q |
| 4 | 5 | Matti Mattsson | Finland | 2:09.96 | Q, NR |
| 5 | 3 | Ryo Tateishi | Japan | 2:10.01 | Q |
| 6 | 8 | Panagiotis Samilidis | Greece | 2:11.21 | |
| 7 | 2 | Tomáš Klobučník | Slovakia | 2:11.56 | |
| 8 | 7 | Marat Amaltdinov | Russia | 2:13.06 | |

==== Semifinal 2 ====
| Rank | Lane | Name | Nationality | Time | Notes |
|---|---|---|---|---|---|
| 1 | 5 | Dániel Gyurta | Hungary | 2:08.50 | Q |
| 2 | 4 | Marco Koch | Germany | 2:08.61 | Q |
| 3 | 3 | Akihiro Yamaguchi | Japan | 2:10.00 | Q |
| 4 | 7 | Kevin Cordes | United States | 2:10.03 | |
| 5 | 1 | Christian vom Lehn | Germany | 2:10.12 | |
| 6 | 6 | Giedrius Titenis | Lithuania | 2:10.17 | |
| 7 | 8 | B.J. Johnson | United States | 2:10.79 | |
| 8 | 2 | Laurent Carnol | Luxembourg | 2:11.73 | |

=== Final ===
The final was held at 19:32.

| Rank | Lane | Name | Nationality | Time | Notes |
|---|---|---|---|---|---|
| 1st place, gold medalist(s) | 4 | Dániel Gyurta | Hungary | 2:07.23 | CR, ER |
| 2nd place, silver medalist(s) | 5 | Marco Koch | Germany | 2:08.54 | |
| 3rd place, bronze medalist(s) | 7 | Matti Mattsson | Finland | 2:08.95 | NR |
| 4 | 3 | Andrew Willis | Great Britain | 2:09.13 | |
| 5 | 2 | Michael Jamieson | Great Britain | 2:09.14 | |
| 6 | 6 | Vyacheslav Sinkevich | Russia | 2:09.34 | |
| 7 | 1 | Akihiro Yamaguchi | Japan | 2:09.57 | |
| 8 | 8 | Ryo Tateishi | Japan | 2:10.28 | |
