= Swimming at the 2013 World Aquatics Championships – Women's 400 metre freestyle =

Women's 400 metre freestyle at the 2013 World Aquatics Championships
- Venue: Palau Sant Jordi
- Date: July 28, 2013 (heats & final)
- Competitors: 37 from 30 nations
- Winning time: 3:59.82 AM

Medalists
gold medal	Katie Ledecky	United States
silver medal	Melanie Costa	Spain
bronze medal	Lauren Boyle	New Zealand

Barcelona Palau San Jordi

The women's 400 meter freestyle event in swimming at the 2013 World Aquatics Championships took place on 28 July at the Palau Sant Jordi in Barcelona, Spain.

== Records ==
Prior to this competition, the existing world and championship records were:

World record	Federica Pellegrini (ITA)	3:59.15	Rome, Italy	26 July 2009
Competition record	Federica Pellegrini (ITA)	3:59.15	Rome, Italy	26 July 2009

== Results ==
=== Heats ===
The heats were held at 11:22.

Rank	Heat	Lane	Name	Nationality	Time	Notes
1	3	5	Katie Ledecky	United States	4:03.05	Q
2	4	6	Melanie Costa	Spain	4:04.20	Q
3	2	5	Jazmin Carlin	Great Britain	4:04.85	Q
4	3	3	Lauren Boyle	New Zealand	4:04.96	Q
5	2	3	Kylie Palmer	Australia	4:05.01	Q
6	4	4	Camille Muffat	France	4:05.53	Q
7	2	6	Boglárka Kapás	Hungary	4:05.61	Q, NR
8	3	2	Andreina Pinto	Venezuela	4:06.02	Q, NR
9	4	3	Mireia Belmonte García	Spain	4:06.76	
10	4	2	Chloe Sutton	United States	4:07.16	
11	3	7	Martina de Memme	Italy	4:08.42	
12	3	6	Shao Yiwen	China	4:09.16	
13	3	4	Bronte Barratt	Australia	4:09.65	
14	2	4	Coralie Balmy	France	4:10.70	
15	3	1	Chihiro Igarashi	Japan	4:12.44	
16	4	1	Savannah King	Canada	4:12.47	
17	4	7	Ellie Faulkner	Great Britain	4:13.18	
18	4	0	Susana Escobar	Mexico	4:13.37	
19	2	7	Diletta Carli	Italy	4:13.89	
20	2	2	Zhang Wenqing	China	4:14.66	
21	3	8	Julia Hassler	Liechtenstein	4:14.68	
22	2	9	Lynette Lim	Singapore	4:14.76	
23	2	1	Sarah Köhler	Germany	4:16.13	
24	4	8	Nina Rangelova	Bulgaria	4:18.94	
25	4	9	Kyna Pereira	South Africa	4:19.66	
26	2	8	Natthanan Junkrajang	Thailand	4:19.77	
27	1	5	Katya Bachrouche	Lebanon	4:20.46	
28	2	0	Tjasa Oder	Slovenia	4:20.82	
29	3	0	Carolina Bilich	Brazil	4:21.40	
30	3	9	Khoo Cai Lin	Malaysia	4:23.67	
31	1	3	Andrea Cedrón	Peru	4:28.78	
32	1	4	Raina Ramdhani	Indonesia	4:29.61	
33	1	6	Daniela Benavides	Cuba	4:35.85	
34	1	2	Alexis Clarke	Barbados	4:42.82	
35	1	1	San Khant Khant Su	Myanmar	4:54.89	
36	1	7	Monica Saili	Samoa	4:55.49	
37	1	8	Victoria Chentsova	Northern Mariana Islands	4:59.78	
	4	5	Lotte Friis	Denmark		DNS

=== Final ===
The final was held at 18:57.

Rank	Lane	Name	Nationality	Time	Notes
1st place, gold medalist(s)	4	Katie Ledecky	United States	3:59.82	AM
2nd place, silver medalist(s)	5	Melanie Costa	Spain	4:02.47	NR
3rd place, bronze medalist(s)	6	Lauren Boyle	New Zealand	4:03.89	
4	3	Jazmin Carlin	Great Britain	4:04.03	
5	1	Boglárka Kapás	Hungary	4:05.90	
6	8	Andreina Pinto	Venezuela	4:07.14	
7	7	Camille Muffat	France	4:07.67	
8	2	Kylie Palmer	Australia	4:08.13	
