= Malaysia at the 2013 World Aquatics Championships =

- Flag of Malaysia
- World Aquatics code: MAS
- National federation: Amateur Swimming Union of Malaysia
- Website: malaysiaswimming.org

in Barcelona, Spain
- Medals Ranked 28th: Gold 0 Silver 0 Bronze 1 Total 1

World Aquatics Championships appearances
- 1973; 1975; 1978; 1982; 1986; 1991; 1994; 1998; 2001; 2003; 2005; 2007; 2009; 2011; 2013; 2015; 2017; 2019; 2022; 2023; 2024; 2025

Malaysia competed at the 2013 World Aquatics Championships in Barcelona, Spain between 19 July and 4 August 2013.

== Medalists ==
| Medal | Name | Sport | Event | Date |
|---|---|---|---|---|
| Bronze | Pandelela Rinong; Leong Mun Yee | Diving | Women's 10 m synchro platform | 22 July |

== Diving ==
Malaysia qualified 8 divers for the following events.

Men

| Athlete | Event | Preliminaries | | Semifinals | | Final | |
| Athlete | Event | Points | Rank | Points | Rank | Points | Rank |
|---|---|---|---|---|---|---|---|
| Ahmad Amsyar Azman | 1 m springboard | 309.15 | 24 | — | | did not advance | |
| Chew Yi Wei | 1 m springboard | 297.00 | 28 | — | | did not advance | |
| Chew Yi Wei | 3 m springboard | 368.75 | 23 | did not advance | | | |
| Ooi Tze Liang | 3 m springboard | 354.45 | 29 | did not advance | | | |
| Ooi Tze Liang | 10 m platform | 412.55 | 12 Q | 411.75 | 14 | did not advance | |
| Ooi Tze Liang; Ahmad Amsyar Azman | 3 m synchronized springboard | 382.77 | 8 Q | — | | 404.61 | 6 |

Women

| Athlete | Event | Preliminaries | | Semifinals | | Final | |
| Athlete | Event | Points | Rank | Points | Rank | Points | Rank |
|---|---|---|---|---|---|---|---|
| Cheong Jun Hoong | 1 m springboard | 265.25 | 4 Q | — | | 245.70 | 9 |
| Cheong Jun Hoong | 3 m springboard | 259.30 | 20 | did not advance | | | |
| Ng Yan Yee | 3 m springboard | 262.95 | 17 Q | 275.50 | 17 | did not advance | |
| Pandelela Rinong | 10 m platform | 351.05 | 2 Q | 314.15 | 8 Q | 334.55 | 6 |
| Traisy Vivien Tukiet | 10 m platform | 244.95 | 30 | did not advance | | | |
| Pandelela Rinong; Cheong Jun Hoong | 3 m synchronized springboard | 283.50 | 5 Q | — | | 289.20 | 5 |
| Pandelela Rinong; Leong Mun Yee | 10 m synchronized platform | 310.98 | 3 Q | — | | 331.14 | 3rd place, bronze medalist(s) |

== Open water swimming ==
Malaysia qualified one quota place for the following event in open water swimming.

| Athlete | Event | Time | Rank |
|---|---|---|---|
| Heidi Gan | Women's 10 km | 1:59:01.4 | 29 |

== Swimming ==
Malaysian swimmers earned qualifying standards in the following events (up to a maximum of 2 swimmers in each event at the A-standard entry time, and 1 at the B-standard):

Men

| Athlete | Event | Heat | | Semifinal | | Final | |
| Athlete | Event | Time | Rank | Time | Rank | Time | Rank |
|---|---|---|---|---|---|---|---|
| Lim Ching Hwang | 200 m freestyle | 1:52.49 | 46 | did not advance | | | |
| Kevin Yeap | 400 m freestyle | 3:59.08 | 37 | — | | did not advance | |
| Kevin Yeap | 1500 m freestyle | 15:46.72 | 33 | — | | did not advance | |
| Shaun Yap | 50 m breaststroke | 29.58 | 55 | did not advance | | | |

Women

| Athlete | Event | Heat | | Semifinal | | Final | |
| Athlete | Event | Time | Rank | Time | Rank | Time | Rank |
|---|---|---|---|---|---|---|---|
| Khoo Cai Lin | 400 m freestyle | 4:23.67 | 30 | — | | did not advance | |
| Khoo Cai Lin | 800 m freestyle | 8:51.87 | 25 | — | | did not advance | |
| Christina Loh | 50 m breaststroke | 33.10 | =47 | did not advance | | | |
| Siow Yi Ting | 100 m breaststroke | 1:10.82 | 34 | did not advance | | | |
| Siow Yi Ting | 200 m breaststroke | 2:31.99 | 23 | did not advance | | | |
| Siow Yi Ting | 200 m individual medley | 2:17.90 | 31 | did not advance | | | |
| Siow Yi Ting | 400 m individual medley | 4:54.84 | 28 | — | | did not advance | |
