= Synchronised swimming at the 2013 World Aquatics Championships – Duet technical routine =

Duet technical routine at the Synchronised swimming at the 2013 World Aquatics Championships
- Dates: 21 July
- Competitors: 66 from 33 nations
- Winning points: 97.300

Medalists
gold medal	Svetlana Kolesnichenko; Svetlana Romashina	Russia
silver medal	Jiang Tingting; Jiang Wenwen	China
bronze medal	Ona Carbonell; Margalida Crespí	Spain

Barcelona Palau San Jordi

The Duet technical routine competition at 2013 World Aquatics Championships was held on July 21 with the preliminary round in the morning and the final in the evening session.

== Results ==
The preliminary round was held at 09:00 and the final at 19:00.

Green denotes finalists

Rank	Diver	Nationality	Preliminary		Final	
Rank	Diver	Nationality	Points	Rank	Points	Rank
1st place, gold medalist(s)	Svetlana Kolesnichenko; Svetlana Romashina	Russia	97.000	1	97.300	1
2nd place, silver medalist(s)	Jiang Tingting; Jiang Wenwen	China	94.800	2	94.900	2
3rd place, bronze medalist(s)	Ona Carbonell; Margalida Crespí	Spain	93.900	3	93.800	3
4	Lolita Ananasova; Anna Voloshyna	Ukraine	91.800	4	92.400	4
5	Yumi Adachi; Yukiko Inui	Japan	90.400	5	91.700	5
6	Chloé Isaac; Karine Thomas	Canada	89.700	6	90.000	6
7	Evangelia Platanioti; Despoina Solomou	Greece	89.200	7	88.300	7
8	Olivia Allison; Jenna Randall	Great Britain	87.700	8	87.800	8
9	Linda Cerruti; Costanza Ferro	Italy	87.300	9	87.800	9
10	Kim Jin-Gyong; Kim Jong-Hui	North Korea	84.100	10	84.700	10
11	Soňa Bernardová; Alžběta Dufková	Czech Republic	83.900	11	84.600	11
12	Isabel Delgado Plancarte; Nuria Diosdado García	Mexico	83.300	12	83.800	12
13	Lorena Molinos; Giovana Stephan	Brazil	83.300	13	82.500	13
14	Pamela Fischer; Anja Nyffeler	Switzerland	82.000	14	82.200	14
15	Etel Sánchez; Sofía Sánchez	Argentina	79.300	15	79.800	15
16	Alexandra Nemich; Yekaterina Nemich	Kazakhstan	78.000	16	78.300	16
17	Estefanía Álvarez; Mónica Arango	Colombia	77.700	17		
18	Wiebke Jeske; Edith Zeppenfeld	Germany	77.600	18		
19	Iryna Limanouskaya; Iya Zhyshkevich	Belarus	77.300	19		
20	Kristina Krajčovičová; Jana Labáthová	Slovakia	77.100	20		
21	Anastasiya Ruzmetova; Anastasiya Zdraykovskaya	Uzbekistan	72.100	21		
22	Olia Burtaev; Bianca Hammett	Australia	71.700	22		
23	Caitlin Anderson; Kirstin Anderson	New Zealand	71.200	23		
24	Gu Se-Ul; Kim Ka-Young	South Korea	70.800	24		
25	Ana Cekić; Jovana Petrović	Serbia	70.000	25		
26	Chen Mei Qi Stephanie; Yap Yu Hui Crystal	Singapore	69.800	26		
27	Anouk Stephanie Eman; Kyra Hoevertsz	Aruba	69.600	27		
28	Maria Kirkova; Katlina Yordanova	Bulgaria	68.500	28		
29	Albany Avila; Karla Loaiza	Venezuela	67.200	29		
30	Bianca Benavides; Violeta Mitnian	Costa Rica	66.300	30		
31	Cho Man Yee Nora; Lau Michelle Hoi Ting	Hong Kong	61.800	31		
32	Carmen Alfonso Rodriguez; Odailys Suarez Castillo	Cuba	31.100	32		
33	Aphichaya Saengrusamee; Arpapat Saengrusamee	Thailand	55.400	33		
