= Ramiro Ramírez =

Cuban baseball player and manager (born 1896)

- Outfielder / Manager
- Born: January 27, 1896; Guanabacoa, Cuba
- Batted: Right Threw: Right

Negro league baseball debut
- 1916, for the Cuban Stars (East)

Last appearance
- 1932, for the Cuban Stars (West)
- Managerial record at Baseball Reference

Teams
- As player: Cuban Stars (West) (1916; Cuban Stars (East) (1916–1920); All Cubans (1921); Bacharach Giants (1922–1924); Baltimore Black Sox (1923); Cuban Stars (West) (1925); Cuban House of David/Pollock's Cuban Stars (1931-1933); As manager: Pollock's Cuban Stars (1932); Indianapolis Clowns (1948)

Ramiro Ramírez Estenor (January 27, 1896 – death unknown) was a Cuban professional baseball outfielder and manager in the Negro leagues and Cuban League.

A native of Guanabacoa, Cuba, Ramírez made his Negro leagues debut in 1916 for the Cuban Stars (East). He went on to play into the 1930s, including stints in the Cuban League with Almendares and Marianao. He served as player/manager of the Cuban House of David/Pollock's Cuban Stars from 1931 to 1933. In 1948, he managed the Indianapolis Clowns.
