= Daniel Islas =

Argentine footballer

Personal information
- Full name: Daniel Alejandro Islas
- Date of birth: February 19, 1979 (age 47)
- Place of birth: Buenos Aires, Argentina
- Height: 1.82 m (6 ft 0 in)
- Position: Goalkeeper

Senior career*
Years	Team	Apps	(Gls)
1997–1999	Independiente	2	(0)
2000–2002	Tigre	32	(0)
2002–2003	Los Andes	17	(0)
2003–2005	Nueva Chicago	37	(0)
2005–2006	Huracán-TA	55	(0)
2007–2012	Tigre	150	(0)
2012–2013	Huracán	38	(0)
2013–2014	Unión	17	(0)
- * Club domestic league appearances and goals as of 00:29, 25 November 2013 (UTC)

Daniel Alejandro Islas (born 19 February 1979) is an Argentine football goalkeeper.

== Career ==
Islas started his professional career in 1997 with Club Atlético Independiente of the Primera División Argentina. In 1999, he dropped down a division to join Club Atlético Tigre where he played until 2002 and then Los Andes between 2002 and 2003.

In 2003 Islas returned to the Primera División with Nueva Chicago but the club were relegated at the end of the 2003-2004 season, he stayed with the club for another season in the Argentine 2nd division. In 2005, he joined Huracán de Tres Arroyos.

In 2007 Islas returned for a second spell with Tigre, he helped the club to gain promotion to the Primera. In Apertura 2007 he was the first team goalkeeper, helping the club to finish in second place, the highest league finish in the club's history. On 5 June 2011, during a match with Huracán, he sprained his ankle. Islas' convalescence would require up to seven months for complete recovery.
