= Piscines Bernat Picornell =

Swimming venue in Barcelona, Spain

Coordinates: 41.3656°N 2.1502°E

- Piscines Picornell
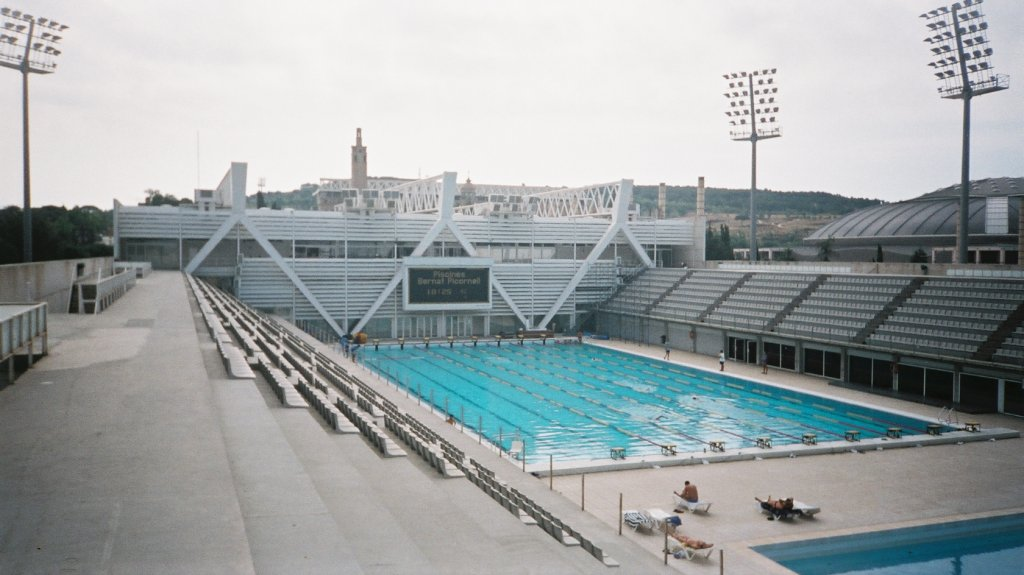
- Interactive map of Piscines Bernat Picornell
- Full name: Piscines Bernat Picornell
- Address: Barcelona, Catalonia, Spain
- Capacity: 3,000

Construction
- Opened: 1970

Piscines Bernat Picornell (English: Bernat Picornell Pools) is a swimming venue situated in the Olympic Ring in Montjuïc, Barcelona. The venue consists of three swimming pools: a 50m indoor pool, a 50m outdoor pool, and a pool for diving. It hosted the swimming events, synchronized swimming events, the water polo final, and the swimming part of the modern pentathlon event for the 1992 Summer Olympics.

The swimming pools are for public use and are open all year long.

== History ==
The venue, named after the Catalan swimmer and founder of the Spanish Swimming Federation Bernat Picornell i Richier, was built to host the 1970 European Aquatics Championships. In 1990, refurbishment works began for the 1992 Olympics; the main changes were that the training pool was covered and that temporary grandstands were installed, boosting the capacity to more than 10,000 spectators.

Since the 1992 Olympics, the outdoor swimming pool, with capacity for 3,000 spectators, has hosted several Spanish and Catalan swimming championships as well as the synchronized swimming events for the 2003 World Aquatics Championships. In 2013, it hosted the water polo events for the 2013 World Aquatics Championships, since the city of Barcelona repeated as host ten years later.

== See also ==
- Piscina Municipal de Montjuïc
