= Diving at the 2013 World Aquatics Championships =

- Host city: Barcelona, Spain
- Date(s): 20 – 28 July
- Venue(s): Palace of Water Sports

The diving portion of the 2013 World Aquatics Championships was held from 20–28 July 2013 at the Piscina Municipal de Montjuïc in Barcelona, Spain.

== Events ==
The following events were contested by both men and women in Barcelona:

- 1 m springboard
- 3 m springboard
- 10 m platform
- 3 m springboard synchronized
- 10 m platform synchronized

Individual events consisted of preliminaries, semifinals and finals. The order of divers in the preliminary round were determined by computerized random selection, during the technical meeting. The 18 divers with the highest scores in the preliminaries proceed to the semifinals.

The semifinal consisted of the top 18 ranked divers from the preliminary competition and the final consisted of the top 12 ranked divers from the semifinal.

== Schedule ==
Date	Time	Round
20 July 2013	10:00	Women's Synchronized 3 metre springboard preliminaries
20 July 2013	14:00	Men's 1 metre springboard preliminaries
20 July 2013	17:30	Women's Synchronized 3 metre springboard final
21 July 2013	10:00	Men's Synchronized 10 metre platform preliminaries
21 July 2013	14:00	Women's 1 metre springboard preliminaries
21 July 2013	17:30	Men's Synchronized 10 metre platform final
22 July 2013	10:00	Women's Synchronized 10 metre platform preliminaries
22 July 2013	14:00	Men's 1 metre springboard final
22 July 2013	17:30	Women's Synchronized 10 metre platform final
23 July 2013	10:00	Men's Synchronized 3 metre springboard preliminaries
23 July 2013	14:00	Women's 1 metre springboard final
23 July 2013	17:30	Men's Synchronized 3 metre springboard final
24 July 2013	10:00	Women's 10 metre platform preliminaries
24 July 2013	14:00	Women's 10 metre platform semifinal
25 July 2013	10:00	Men's 3 metre springboard preliminaries
25 July 2013	14:00	Men's 3 metre springboard semifinal
25 July 2013	17:30	Women's 10 metre platform final
26 July 2013	10:00	Women's 3 metre springboard preliminaries
26 July 2013	14:00	Women's 3 metre springboard semifinal
26 July 2013	17:30	Men's 3 metre springboard final
27 July 2013	10:00	Men's 10 metre platform preliminaries
27 July 2013	14:00	Men's 10 metre platform semifinal
27 July 2013	17:30	Women's 3 metre springboard final
28 July 2013	14:00	Men's 10 metre platform final

== Medal summary ==
=== Medal table ===
* Host nation

Rank	Nation	Gold	Silver	Bronze	Total
1	China	9	2	2	13
2	Germany	1	0	1	2
3	Russia	0	3	0	3
4	Italy	0	2	0	2
5	Canada	0	1	2	3
6	Ukraine	0	1	1	2
7	United States	0	1	0	1
8	Mexico	0	0	3	3
9	Malaysia	0	0	1	1
Totals (9 entries)		10	10	10	30

=== Men ===
Event	Gold		Silver		Bronze	
1 metre springboard	Li Shixin; China	460.95	Illya Kvasha; Ukraine	434.30	Kevin Chavez; Mexico	431.55
3 metre springboard	He Chong; China	544.95	Evgeny Kuznetsov; Russia	508.00	Yahel Castillo; Mexico	498.30
10 metre platform	Qiu Bo; China	581.00	David Boudia; United States	517.40	Sascha Klein; Germany	508.55
Synchronized; 3 metre springboard	Qin Kai; He Chong; China	448.86	Ilya Zakharov; Evgeny Kuznetsov; Russia	428.01	Rommel Pacheco; Jahir Ocampo; Mexico	422.79
Synchronized; 10 metre platform	Sascha Klein; Patrick Hausding; Germany	461.46	Victor Minibaev; Artem Chesakov; Russia	445.95	Cao Yuan; Zhang Yanquan; China	445.56

=== Women ===
Event	Gold		Silver		Bronze	
1 metre springboard	He Zi; China	307.10	Tania Cagnotto; Italy	307.00	Wang Han; China	297.75
3 metre springboard	He Zi; China	383.40	Wang Han; China	356.25	Pamela Ware; Canada	350.25
10 metre platform	Si Yajie; China	392.15	Chen Ruolin; China	388.70	Yulia Prokopchuk; Ukraine	358.40
Synchronized; 3 metre springboard	Wu Minxia; Shi Tingmao; China	338.40	Tania Cagnotto; Francesca Dallapé; Italy	307.80	Jennifer Abel; Pamela Ware; Canada	292.08
Synchronized; 10 metre platform	Liu Huixia; Chen Ruolin; China	356.28	Meaghan Benfeito; Roseline Filion; Canada	331.41	Pandelela Rinong; Leong Mun Yee; Malaysia	331.14

== Participating nations ==
- Armenia (2)
- Australia (8)
- Austria (2)
- Azerbaijan (2)
- Belarus (2)
- Brazil (1)
- Canada (7)
- China (15)
- Chinese Taipei (1)
- Colombia (6)
- Croatia (2)
- Cuba (7)
- Dominican Republic (2)
- Finland (1)
- France (4)
- Georgia (1)
- Germany (10)
- Great Britain (10)
- Greece (2)
- Hong Kong (5)
- Hungary (4)
- Indonesia (7)
- Italy (11)
- Jamaica (1)
- Japan (4)
- South Korea (6)
- North Korea (5)
- Kuwait (1)
- Lithuania (2)
- Macau (5)
- Malaysia (8)
- Mexico (13)
- Netherlands (4)
- Norway (3)
- Poland (1)
- Puerto Rico (1)
- Romania (2)
- Russia (13)
- South Africa (4)
- Spain (6)
- Sweden (4)
- Ukraine (12)
- United States (15)
- Venezuela (6)
