= List of Asian Games medalists in artistic swimming =

This is the complete list of Asian Games medalists in artistic swimming from 1994 to 2026.

== Women ==
=== Solo ===
| Games | Gold | Silver | Bronze |
|---|---|---|---|
| 1994 Hiroshima | Fumiko Okuno (JPN) | Wu Chunlan (CHN) | Choi Jeong-yun (KOR) |
| 1998 Bangkok | Miya Tachibana (JPN) | Choi Yoo-jin (KOR) | Li Yuanyuan (CHN) |
| 2002 Busan | Miya Tachibana (JPN) | Jang Yoon-kyeong (KOR) | Li Zhen (CHN) |

=== Duet ===
| Games | Gold | Silver | Bronze |
|---|---|---|---|
| 1994 Hiroshima | Japan (JPN); Fumiko Okuno; Miya Tachibana | China (CHN); Fu Yuling; Li Min | South Korea (KOR); Choi Jeong-yun; Choi Yoo-jin |
| 1998 Bangkok | Japan (JPN); Miya Tachibana; Miho Takeda | South Korea (KOR); Jang Yoon-kyeong; Yoo Na-mi | China (CHN); Li Min; Long Yan |
| 2002 Busan | Japan (JPN); Miya Tachibana; Miho Takeda | China (CHN); Gu Beibei; Zhang Xiaohuan | South Korea (KOR); Jang Yoon-kyeong; Kim Min-jeong |
| 2006 Doha | China (CHN); Jiang Tingting; Jiang Wenwen; Wang Na | Japan (JPN); Saho Harada; Ayako Matsumura; Emiko Suzuki | Kazakhstan (KAZ); Ainur Kerey; Anna Kulkina; Arna Toktagan |
| 2010 Guangzhou | China (CHN); Jiang Tingting; Jiang Wenwen | Japan (JPN); Yukiko Inui; Chisa Kobayashi | South Korea (KOR); Park Hyun-ha; Park Hyun-sun |
| 2014 Incheon | China (CHN); Huang Xuechen; Sun Wenyan; Sun Yijing | Japan (JPN); Yukiko Inui; Hikaru Kazumori; Risako Mitsui | Kazakhstan (KAZ); Alexandra Nemich; Yekaterina Nemich; Amina Yermakhanova |
| 2018 Jakarta–Palembang | China (CHN); Jiang Tingting; Jiang Wenwen | Japan (JPN); Yukiko Inui; Megumu Yoshida | Kazakhstan (KAZ); Alexandra Nemich; Yekaterina Nemich |
| 2022 Hangzhou | China (CHN); Wang Liuyi; Wang Qianyi | Japan (JPN); Moe Higa; Tomoka Sato; Mashiro Yasunaga | Kazakhstan (KAZ); Arina Pushkina; Yasmin Tuyakova |
| 2026 Aichi–Nagoya | China (CHN); Lin Yanjun; Xu Huiyan | Japan (JPN); Moe Higa; Tomoka Sato | Kazakhstan (KAZ); Nargiza Bolatova; Yasmin Tuyakova |

=== Team ===
- In 2022, open to both genders

| Games | Gold | Silver | Bronze |
|---|---|---|---|
| 2006 Doha | China (CHN); Gu Beibei; Jiang Tingting; Jiang Wenwen; Liu Ou; Sun Qiuting; Wang Na; Wu Yiwen; Zhang Xiaohuan; Zhu Zheng | Japan (JPN); Ai Aoki; Reiko Fujimori; Saho Harada; Hiromi Kobayashi; Erika Komura; Takako Konishi; Ayako Matsumura; Emiko Suzuki; Erina Suzuki; Masako Tachibana | North Korea (PRK); Hwang Kum-song; Kim Ok-gyong; Kim Yong-mi; So Un-byol; Tokgo Pom; Wang Ok-gyong; Yun Hui |
| 2010 Guangzhou | China (CHN); Chang Si; Chen Xiaojun; Huang Xuechen; Jiang Tingting; Jiang Wenwen; Liu Ou; Luo Xi; Sun Wenyan; Wu Yiwen; Yu Lele | Japan (JPN); Yumi Adachi; Miho Arai; Aika Hakoyama; Yukiko Inui; Mayo Itoyama; Chisa Kobayashi; Mai Nakamura; Misa Sugiyama; Yui Ueminami; Kurumi Yoshida | North Korea (PRK); Jang Hyang-mi; Kim Jin-gyong; Kim Jong-hui; Kim Ok-gyong; Kim Su-hyang; Kim Yong-mi; So Un-byol; Wang Ok-gyong |
| 2014 Incheon | China (CHN); Chen Xiaojun; Gu Xiao; Guo Li; Li Xiaolu; Liang Xinping; Sun Wenyan; Sun Yijing; Tang Mengni; Yu Lele; Zeng Zhen | Japan (JPN); Miho Arai; Aika Hakoyama; Yukiko Inui; Mayo Itoyama; Hikaru Kazumori; Kei Marumo; Risako Mitsui; Kanami Nakamaki; Mai Nakamura; Kurumi Yoshida | North Korea (PRK); Jong Na-ri; Jong Yon-hui; Kang Un-ha; Kim Jin-gyong; Kim Jong-hui; Kim Ju-hye; Kim U-na; Ri Il-sim; Ri Ji-hyang; Yun Yu-jong |
| 2018 Jakarta–Palembang | China (CHN); Chang Hao; Feng Yu; Guo Li; Liang Xinping; Wang Liuyi; Wang Qianyi; Xiao Yanning; Yin Chengxin | Japan (JPN); Juka Fukumura; Yukiko Inui; Moeka Kijima; Okina Kyogoku; Kei Marumo; Kano Omata; Mayu Tsukamoto; Mashiro Yasunaga; Megumu Yoshida | North Korea (PRK); Cha Ye-gyong; Jang Hyon-ok; Jong Na-ri; Ko Su-rim; Min Hae-yon; Mun Hye-song; Ri Il-sim; Ri Sol; Yun Yu-jong |
| 2022 Hangzhou | China (CHN); Chang Hao; Cheng Wentao; Feng Yu; Shi Haoyu; Wang Ciyue; Wang Liuyi; Wang Qianyi; Xiang Binxuan; Xiao Yanning; Zhang Yayi | Japan (JPN); Moka Fujii; Moe Higa; Moeka Kijima; Tomoka Sato; Ayano Shimada; Ami Wada; Akane Yanagisawa; Mashiro Yasunaga; Megumu Yoshida | Kazakhstan (KAZ); Nargiza Bolatova; Eteri Kakutia; Aigerim Kurmangaliyeva; Xeniya Makarova; Arina Myasnikova; Anna Pavletsova; Arina Pushkina; Yasmin Tuyakova; Zhaklin Yakimova; Zhaniya Zhiyengazy |
| 2026 Aichi–Nagoya | China (CHN); Chang Hao; Lin Yanhan; Lin Yanjun; Li Xiuchen; Zhang Xiaoyou; Xu Huiyan; Zhang Yayi; Xiang Binxuan; Dai Shiyi; Guo Muye | Japan (JPN); Nao Shirahase; Kaho Aitaka; Yuka Kawase; Uta Kobayashi; Ayano Shimada; Moka Fujii; Moe Higa; Tomoka Sato; Konatsu Ishi; Risako Mitsuhashi | Kazakhstan (KAZ); Nargiza Bolatova; Viktor Druzin; Aigerim Kurmangaliyeva; Karina Magrupova; Xeniya Makarova; Anna Pavletsova; Valeriya Stolbunova; Yasmin Tuyakova; Dayana Jamanchalova; Zhaklin Yakimova |

=== Combination ===
| Games | Gold | Silver | Bronze |
|---|---|---|---|
| 2010 Guangzhou | China (CHN); Chang Si; Chen Xiaojun; Fan Jiachen; Huang Xuechen; Jiang Tingting; Jiang Wenwen; Liu Ou; Luo Xi; Shi Xin; Sun Wenyan; Wu Yiwen; Yu Lele | Japan (JPN); Yumi Adachi; Miho Arai; Aika Hakoyama; Yukiko Inui; Mayo Itoyama; Chisa Kobayashi; Mai Nakamura; Misa Sugiyama; Yui Ueminami; Kurumi Yoshida | Kazakhstan (KAZ); Aigerim Anarbayeva; Aigerim Issayeva; Ainur Kerey; Tatyana Kukharskaya; Anna Kulkina; Aisulu Nauryzbayeva; Alexandra Nemich; Yekaterina Nemich; Amina Yermakhanova; Aigerim Zhexembinova |
| 2014 Incheon | China (CHN); Chen Xiaojun; Gu Xiao; Guo Li; Huang Xuechen; Li Xiaolu; Liang Xinping; Sun Wenyan; Sun Yijing; Tang Mengni; Yin Chengxin; Yu Lele; Zeng Zhen | Japan (JPN); Miho Arai; Aika Hakoyama; Yukiko Inui; Mayo Itoyama; Hikaru Kazumori; Kei Marumo; Risako Mitsui; Natsumi Miyazaki; Kanami Nakamaki; Mai Nakamura; Kurumi Yoshida | Kazakhstan (KAZ); Aigerim Anarbayeva; Xeniya Kachurina; Yuliya Kempel; Alina Matkova; Aisulu Nauryzbayeva; Alexandra Nemich; Yekaterina Nemich; Daniya Talgatova; Kristina Tynybayeva; Amina Yermakhanova; Olga Yezdakova |
