= 2012 Asian Swimming Championships =

International swimming competition

9th Asian Swimming Championships
- Host city: Dubai, United Arab Emirates
- Date: November 15 – 25, 2012
- Venue: 1

The 9th Asian Swimming Championships was held 15–25 November 2012 in Dubai, United Arab Emirates. It was the second time that Dubai hosted the Championships; the city previously hosted in 2004. The 10th Asian Swimming Championships will be held in 2016 in Japan.

The Championships was organized by the Asia Swimming Federation (AASF), and in 2012 featured competition in 4 of the 5 Aquatics disciplines:

- Swimming: 15–18 November (long course);
- Synchronized Swimming: 15–18 November;
- Water Polo: 19–25 November; and
- Diving: 22–25 November.

Note: The AASF hosted a 2012 Championships in the fifth Aquatics discipline (Open Water), 21 October in Hong Kong.

== Medalists ==
=== Swimming ===
==== Men's events ====
Event	Gold		Silver		Bronze	
50m freestyle	Lü Zhiwu (CHN)	22.60	Shi Yang (CHN)	22.91	Toru Maruyama (JPN)	23.09
100m freestyle	Lü Zhiwu (CHN)	49.27 CR	Toru Maruyama (JPN)	50.82	Shi Tengfei (CHN)	50.89
200m freestyle	Sun Yang (CHN)	1:45.49 CR	Hao Yun (CHN)	1:49.67	Takumi Komatsu (JPN)	1:50.68
400m freestyle	Sun Yang (CHN)	3:42.49 CR	Hao Yun (CHN)	3:54.34	Takumi Komatsu (JPN)	3:54.59
1500 freestyle	Sun Yang (CHN)	14:44.10 CR	Hao Yun (CHN); Shogo Takeda (JPN)	15:16.22	Not awarded, as there was a tie for silver.	
50m backstroke	Cheng Feiyi (CHN)	25.25 CR	Takeshi Kawamoto (JPN)	25.82	Xu Jiayu (CHN)	25.89
100m backstroke	Xu Jiayu (CHN)	54.24 CR	Takeshi Kawamoto (JPN)	55.77	Ng Rainer (SIN)	57.14
200m backstroke	Zhang Fenglin (CHN)	1:56.38 CR	Xu Jiayu (CHN)	1:58.94	Keita Sunama (JPN)	1:59.77
50m breaststroke	Li Xiayan (CHN)	28.10	Yoshiki Yamanaka (JPN)	28.63	Wong Chun Yan (HKG)	28.67
100m breaststroke	Kazuki Kohinata (JPN)	1:02.18	Choi Kyu-Woong (KOR)	1:02.54	Huang Yunkun (CHN)	1:02.64
200m breaststroke	Kazuki Kohinata (JPN)	2:12.13 CR	Kazuki Utsunomiya (JPN)	2:14.68	Nuttapong Ketin (THA)	2:15.18
50m butterfly	Chen Yin (CHN)	24.63	Shi Tengfei (CHN)	24.67	Toru Maruyama (JPN)	24.77
100m butterfly	Chang Gyu-Cheol (KOR)	52.73	Chen Yin (CHN)	53.14	Takeshi Kawamoto (JPN)	53.17
200m butterfly	Chen Yin (CHN)	1:57.50	Masato Sakai (JPN)	1:57.52	Hsu Chi-chieh (TPE)	1:59.68
200m I.M.	Wang Shun (CHN)	1:58.66 CR	Zhang Fenglin (CHN)	1:59.26	Keita Sunama (JPN)	2:01.34
400m I.M.	Wang Shun (CHN)	4:16.59 CR	Keita Sunama (JPN)	4:19.75	Liu Weijia (CHN)	4:21.25
4×100m freestyle	China (CHN); Shi Tengfei; Chen Zuo; Zeng Lingfei; Lü Zhiwu	3:21.71	Japan (JPN); Kenta Hirai; Toru Maruyama; Takumi Komatsu; Takeshi Kawamoto	3:23.09	Hong Kong (HKG); Cheah Geoffrey Robin; Ng Chun Nam Derick; Cheung Kin Tat Kent; Wong Kai Wai David	3:24.10
4×200m freestyle	China (CHN); Wang Shun; Pu Wenjie; Lü Zhiwu; Hao Yun	7:21.32 CR	Japan (JPN); Takumi Komatsu; Tomoki Kitanobo; Toru Maruyama; Kenta Hirai	7:26.17	Hong Kong (HKG); Wong Kai Wai David; Ng Chun Nam Derick; Cheung Kin Tat Kent; Cheah Geoffrey Robin	7:40.51
4×100m medley	China (CHN); Cheng Feiyi; Li Xiayan; Chen Yin; Lü Zhiwu	3:39.48	Japan (JPN); Takeshi Kawamoto; Yoshiki Yamanaka; Kenta Hirai; Toru Maruyama	3:41.10	Hong Kong (HKG); Cheah Geoffrey Robin; Wong Chun Yan; Ng Chun Nam Derick; Wong Kai Wai David	3:47.18

==== Women's events ====
Event	Gold		Silver		Bronze	
50m freestyle	Tang Yi (CHN)	25.70	Wang Haibing (CHN)	25.95	Amanda Lim (SIN)	26.17
100m freestyle	Tang Yi (CHN)	54.90	Qiu Yuhan (CHN)	55.96	Mao Kawakami (JPN)	56.62
200m freestyle	Pang Jiaying (CHN)	1:59.77	Tang Yi (CHN)	2:00.70	Sze Hang Yu (HKG)	2:00.84
400m freestyle	Xu Danlu (CHN)	4:05.75 CR	Shao Yiwen (CHN)	4:10.88	Natthanan Junkrajang (THA)	4:14.59
800m freestyle	Xu Danlu (CHN)	8:22.24 CR	Shao Yiwen (CHN)	8:37.40	Yukimi Moriyama (JPN)	8:45.32
50m backstroke	Zhao Jing (CHN)	27.83	Fu Yuanhui (CHN)	28.12	Tao Li (SIN)	29.19
100m backstroke	Zhao Jing (CHN)	59.97	Fu Yuanhui (CHN)	1:00.54	Marie Kamimura (JPN)	1:02.79
200m backstroke	Bai Anqi (CHN)	2:11.38	Nguyễn Thị Ánh Viên (VIE)	2:12.47	Marie Kamimura (JPN)	2:12.73
50m breaststroke	Zhao Jin (CHN)	32.18	Lei On Kei (MAC)	32.58	Misaki Sekiguchi (JPN); Samantha Yeo (SIN)	33.09
100m breaststroke	Zhao Jin (CHN)	1:09.27	Back Su-Yeon (KOR)	1:09.71	Misaki Sekiguchi (JPN)	1:10.46
200m breaststroke	Zhao Jin (CHN)	2:29.29	Back Su-Yeon (KOR)	2:30.18	Liu Hongjiao (CHN)	2:30.86
50m butterfly	Lu Ying (CHN)	26.34	Tao Li (SIN)	26.93	Sze Hang Yu (HKG)	27.32
100m butterfly	Lu Ying (CHN)	58.92	Sze Hang Yu (HKG)	1:00.07	Rino Hosoda (JPN)	
200m butterfly	Ha Sinan (CHN)	2:09.78	Choi Hye-Ra (KOR)	2:10.34	Misuzu Yabu (JPN)	2:10.90
200m I.M.	Choi Hye-Ra (KOR)	2:14.49	Li Jiaxing (CHN)	2:15.37	Chihiro Igarashi (JPN)	2:15.42
400m I.M.	Hiroko Makino (JPN)	4:45.76	Qiao Qiao (CHN)	4:46.60	Nguyễn Thị Ánh Viên (VIE)	4:48.23
4×100m freestyle	China (CHN); Qiu Yuhan; Wang Haibing; Liu Xinyi; Pang Jiaying	3:45.14	Japan (JPN); Megumi Ito; Chihiro Igarashi; Mao Kawakami; Rino Hosoda	3:48.26	Hong Kong (HKG); Yu Wai Ting; Mok Hoi Man Sheron; Chan Kin Lok; Sze Hang Yu	3:49.14
4×200m freestyle	China (CHN); Shao Yiwen; Pang Jiaying; Wang Haibing; Tang Yi	8:10.85	Japan (JPN); Chihiro Igarashi; Mao Kawakami; Megumi Ito; Tsuzumi Hasegawa	8:12.51	Hong Kong (HKG); Sze Hang Yu; Wong Yee Ching; Mok Hoi Man Sheron; Chan Kin Lok	8:25.68
4×100m medley	China (CHN); Zhao Jing; Zhao Jin; Lu Ying; Tang Yi	4:05.70	Japan (JPN); Marie Kamimura; Misaki Sekiguchi; Rino Hosoda; Mao Kawakami	4:10.32	Hong Kong (HKG); Lau Yin Yan Claudia; Ip Rainbow; Chan Kin Lok; Sze Hang Yu	4:14.57

=== Swimming Medal Table ===
Rank	Nation	Gold	Silver	Bronze	Total
1	China (CHN)	33	17	5	55
2	Japan (JPN)	3	14	16	33
3	South Korea (KOR)	2	4	0	6
4	Hong Kong (HKG)	0	1	9	10
5	Singapore (SIN)	0	1	4	5
6	Vietnam (VIE)	0	1	1	2
7	Macau (MAC)	0	1	0	1
8	Thailand (THA)	0	0	2	2
9	Chinese Taipei (TPE)	0	0	1	1
Totals (9 entries)		38	39	38	115

=== Synchronized Swimming ===
Event	Gold	Silver	Bronze
Solo technical routine	Huang Xuechen (CHN)	Yukiko Inui (JPN)	Jang Hyang-Mi (PRK)
Solo free routine	Sun Wenyan (CHN)	Yumi Adachi (JPN)	Ri Ji-Hyang (PRK)
Duet technical routine	China (CHN); Huang Xuechen; Liu Ou	Japan (JPN); Yukiko Inui; Aika Hakoyama; Risako Mitsui	North Korea (PRK); Kim Jin-Kyong; Kim Jong-Hui
Duet free routine	China (CHN); Jiang Tingting; Jiang Wenwen	Japan (JPN); Aika Hakoyama; Yukiko Inui; Risako Mitsui	North Korea (PRK); Kim Jong-Hui; Ri Ji-Hyang
Team technical routine	China (CHN); Huang Xuechen; Liu Ou; Jiang Wenwen; Jiang Tingting; Sun Wenyan; Wu Yiwen; Luo Xi; Chang Si; Chen Xiaojun; Guo Li	North Korea (PRK); Ri Ji-Hyang; Jong Yon-Hui; Jong Na-Ri; Ri Il-Sim; Kim Ju-Hye; Kim Jong-Hui; Kim Jin-Kyong; Jang Hyang-Mi	Kazakhstan (KAZ); Aigerim Zhexembinova; Amina Yermakhanova; Aigerim Anarbayeva; Aisulu Nauryzbayeva; Aigerim Issayeva; Yuliya Kempel; Alina Matkova; Xeniya Kachurina; Baimakhanova Kerey; Kristina Tynybayeva
Team free routine	China (CHN); Chen Xiaojun; Chang Si; Guo Li; Wu Yiwen; Luo Xi; Jiang Tingting; Huang Xuechen; Liu Ou; Sun Wenyan; Jiang Wenwen	North Korea (PRK); Ri Ji-Hyang; Jong Yon-Hui; Kim Ju-Hye; Jong Na-Ri; Ri Il-Sim; Kim Jong-Hui; Kim Jin-Kyong; Jang Hyang-Mi	Kazakhstan (KAZ); Aisulu Nauryzbayeva; Kristina Tynybayeva; Baimakhanova Kerey; Xeniya Kachurina; Alina Matkova; Amina Yermakhanova; Aigerim Issayeva; Aigerim Anarbayeva; Yuliya Kempel
Free routine combination	China (CHN); Huang Xuechen; Yu Lele; Fan Jiachen; Guo Li; Chang Si; Luo Xi; Chen Xiaojun; Sun Wenyan; Jiang Tingting; Jiang Wenwen; Liu Ou; Wu Yiwen	Japan (JPN); Kurumi Yoshida; Sugiyama Misa; Kanami Nakamaki; Miho Arai; Mayo Itoyama; Risako Mitsui; Mai Nakamura; Aika Hakoyama; Yumi Adachi; Yukiko Inui	Kazakhstan (KAZ); Alexandra Nemich; Yekaterina Nemich; Aigerim Zhexembinova; Amina Yermakhanova; Aigerim Anarbayeva; Aisulu Nauryzbayeva; Aigerim Issayeva; Yuliya Kempel; Alina Matkova; Xeniya Kachurina; Baimakhanova Kerey; Kristina Tynybayeva

=== Synchronized Swimming Medal Table ===
Rank	Nation	Gold	Silver	Bronze	Total
1	China (CHN)	7	0	0	7
2	Japan (JPN)	0	5	0	5
3	North Korea (PRK)	0	2	4	6
4	Kazakhstan (KAZ)	0	0	3	3
Totals (4 entries)		7	7	7	21

=== Diving ===
Event	Gold		Silver		Bronze	
Men's 3m Springboard	Zhou Xin (CHN)	480.25	Ooi Tze Liang (MAS)	440.50	Xie Zhen (HKG)	420.75
Men's Synchronised 3m Springboard	Lin Jin & Su Zewan (CHN)	399.57	Ooi Tze Liang & Chew Yi Wei (MAS)	336.33	Poon Jason Wai Ching & Chow Ho Wing (HKG)	322.95
Men's 10m Platform	Wu Jun (CHN)		Li Ping'An (CHN)		Otsuka Chiaki (JPN)	
Men's Synchronized 10m Platform	Wang Anqi & Wu Jun (CHN)		Otsuka Chiaki & Okajima Taichi (JPN)		Chew Yiwei & Ooi Tze Liang (MAS)	
Women's 3m Springboard	Zhang Jun (CHN)	368.25	Wei Ying (CHN)	347.50	Cheong Jun Hoong (MAS)	310.45
Women's Synchronized 3m Springboard	Chen Ye & Qu Lin (CHN)	321.90	Tatsumi Fuka & Mabuch Yuka (JPN)	270.69	Cheong Jun Hoong & Loi Teng (MAS)	255.27
Women's 10m Platform	WU SHENGPING (CHN)		XING YIYING (CHN)		TATSUMI Fuka (JPN)	
Women's Synchronized 10m Platform	WANG WENNA& XING YIYING (CHN)		TATSUMI Fuka& MABUCHI Yuka (JPN)		CHEONG JUN HOONG& LOH ZHIAYI (MAS)	

=== Diving medal table ===
Rank	Nation	Gold	Silver	Bronze	Total
1	China (CHN)	8	3	0	11
2	Japan (JPN)	0	3	2	5
3	Malaysia (MAS)	0	2	4	6
4	Hong Kong (HKG)	0	0	2	2
Totals (4 entries)		8	8	8	24

=== Water Polo ===
Event	Gold	Silver	Bronze
Men's Tournament	China (CHN)	Kazakhstan (KAZ)	Japan (JPN)
Women's Tournament	China (CHN)	Kazakhstan (KAZ)	Uzbekistan (UZB)

Results:

==== Men ====
Page 1-189:

A: China - Singapore - Uzbekistan - Saudi Arabia - Sri Lanka

B: Kazakhstan - Japan - Thailand - Hong Kong

1. CHN 4W 93-12 +81
2. SIN 2W 1D 1L 42-42 0
3. UZB 2W 2L 42-44 -2
4. KSA 1W 1D 2L 37-37 0
5. SRI 4L 15-94 -79
1. KAZ 3W 59-14 +45
2. JPN 2W 1L 69-13 +56
3. THA 1W 2L 17-54 -37
4. HKG 3L 7-71 -64

19 Nov 2012:

1. Saudi Arabia 4 - 8 Uzbekistan
2. China 26 - 2 Sri Lanka
3. Hong Kong 4 - 12 Thailand
4. Kazakhstan 10 - 9 Japan
5. China 16 - 2 Saudi Arabia

20 Nov 2012:

1. Japan 27 - 2 Thailand
2. Hong Kong 2 - 26 Kazakhstan
3. Uzbekistan 21 - 4 Sri Lanka
4. Saudi Arabia 8 - 8 Singapore

21 Nov 2012:

1. Sri Lanka 4 - 24 Singapore
2. Uzbekistan 6 - 28 China
3. Hong Kong 1 - 33 Japan
4. Kazakhstan 23 - 3 Thailand
5. Singapore 8 - 7 Uzbekistan

22 Nov 2012:

1. Singapore 2 - 23 China
2. Sri Lanka 5 - 23 Saudi Arabia

23 Nov 2012: (Quarterfinal)

1. Singapore 9 - 5 Thailand
2. Uzbekistan 4 - 23 Japan
3. China 27 - 3 Hong Kong
4. Saudi Arabia 4 - 14 Kazakhstan

24 Nov 2012:

1. Thailand 4 - 8 Saudi Arabia
2. Uzbekistan 18 - 4 Hong Kong
3. Singapore 4 - 16 Kazakhstan
4. Japan 8 - 9 China

25 Nov 2012:

1. Thailand 6 - 8 Hong Kong
2. Saudi Arabia 9 - 10 Uzbekistan
3. Singapore 5 - 18 Japan
4. Kazakhstan 11 - 13 China

1. Kazakhstan
2. China
3. Japan
4. Singapore
5. Uzbekistan
6. Saudi Arabia
7. Hong Kong
8. Thailand
9. Sri Lanka

==== Women ====
Page 190-316:

1. China 6W 0L 175-11 +164
2. Kazakhstan 5W 1L 159-25 +134
3. Uzbekistan 4W 2L 103-55 +48
4. Singapore 3W 3L 56-94 -38
5. India 2W 4L 48-122 -74
6. Hong Kong 1W 5L 22-112 -90
7. Sri Lanka 0W 6L 18-162 -144

19 Nov 2012:

1. Singapore 3 - 13 Uzbekistan
2. Kazakhstan 34 - 0 Hong Kong
3. China 40 - 1 India

20 Nov 2012:

1. Singapore 11 - 4 Hong Kong
2. Uzbekistan 28 - 5 India
3. Kazakhstan 39 - 0 Sri Lanka

21 Nov 2012:

1. Hong Kong 7 - 11 India
2. Singapore 27 - 6 Sri Lanka
3. Uzbekistan 2 - 27 China

22 Nov 2012:

1. Sri Lanka 5 - 19 India
2. Hong Kong 2 - 30 China
3. Singapore 5 - 32 Kazakhstan

23 Nov 2012:

1. Sri Lanka 0 - 35 China
2. India 3 - 30 Kazakhstan
3. Hong Kong 2 - 21 Uzbekistan

24 Nov 2012:

1. Kazakhstan 16 - 6 Uzbekistan
2. China 30 - 0 Singapore
3. Sri Lanka 5 - 9 Hong Kong

25 Nov 2012:

1. India 9 - 12 Singapore
2. China 13 - 8 Kazakhstan
3. Sri Lanka 2 - 33 Uzbekistan

=== Water Polo Medal Table ===
Rank	Nation	Gold	Silver	Bronze	Total
1	China (CHN)	2	0	0	2
2	Kazakhstan (KAZ)	0	2	0	2
3	Japan (JPN)	0	0	1	1
3	Uzbekistan (UZB)	0	0	1	1
Totals (4 entries)		2	2	2	6

=== All Medal Table ===
Rank	Nation	Gold	Silver	Bronze	Total
1	China (CHN)	50	20	5	75
2	Japan (JPN)	3	22	19	44
3	South Korea (KOR)	2	4	0	6
4	Malaysia (MAS)	0	2	4	6
4	North Korea (PRK)	0	2	4	6
6	Kazakhstan (KAZ)	0	2	3	5
7	Hong Kong (HKG)	0	1	11	12
8	Singapore (SIN)	0	1	4	5
9	Vietnam (VIE)	0	1	1	2
10	Macau (MAC)	0	1	0	1
11	Thailand (THA)	0	0	2	2
12	Chinese Taipei (TPE)	0	0	1	1
12	Uzbekistan (UZB)	0	0	1	1
Totals (13 entries)		55	56	55	166
