= Synchronized swimming at the 2010 Asian Games =

- Venue: Foshan Aquatics Center
- Dates: 19–21 November 2010
- Competitors: 69 from 9 nations

Synchronized swimming as Synchronized swimming at the 2010 Asian Games was held in Foshan Aquatics Center, Foshan, China from November 19 to 21, 2010. Only women's events were held in three competitions. China dominated the competition by winning all three gold medals ahead of Japan with three silver medals.

== Schedule ==
T	Technical routine	F	Free routine

Event↓/Date →	19th Fri		20th Sat		21st Sun
Women's duet	T	F			
Women's team			T	F	
Women's combination					F

== Medalists ==
Event	Gold	Silver	Bronze
Duet	China; Jiang Tingting; Jiang Wenwen	Japan; Yukiko Inui; Chisa Kobayashi	South Korea; Park Hyun-ha; Park Hyun-sun
Team	China; Chang Si; Chen Xiaojun; Huang Xuechen; Jiang Tingting; Jiang Wenwen; Liu Ou; Luo Xi; Sun Wenyan; Wu Yiwen; Yu Lele	Japan; Yumi Adachi; Miho Arai; Aika Hakoyama; Yukiko Inui; Mayo Itoyama; Chisa Kobayashi; Mai Nakamura; Misa Sugiyama; Yui Ueminami; Kurumi Yoshida	North Korea; Jang Hyang-mi; Kim Jin-gyong; Kim Jong-hui; Kim Ok-gyong; Kim Su-hyang; Kim Yong-mi; So Un-byol; Wang Ok-gyong
Combination	China; Chang Si; Chen Xiaojun; Fan Jiachen; Huang Xuechen; Jiang Tingting; Jiang Wenwen; Liu Ou; Luo Xi; Shi Xin; Sun Wenyan; Wu Yiwen; Yu Lele	Japan; Yumi Adachi; Miho Arai; Aika Hakoyama; Yukiko Inui; Mayo Itoyama; Chisa Kobayashi; Mai Nakamura; Misa Sugiyama; Yui Ueminami; Kurumi Yoshida	Kazakhstan; Aigerim Anarbayeva; Aigerim Issayeva; Ainur Kerey; Tatyana Kukharskaya; Anna Kulkina; Aisulu Nauryzbayeva; Alexandra Nemich; Yekaterina Nemich; Amina Yermakhanova; Aigerim Zhexembinova

== Medal table ==
Rank	Nation	Gold	Silver	Bronze	Total
1	China (CHN)	3	0	0	3
2	Japan (JPN)	0	3	0	3
3	Kazakhstan (KAZ)	0	0	1	1
3	North Korea (PRK)	0	0	1	1
3	South Korea (KOR)	0	0	1	1
Totals (5 entries)		3	3	3	9

== Participating nations ==
A total of 69 athletes from 9 nations competed in synchronized swimming at the 2010 Asian Games:

- China (12)
- Japan (10)
- Kazakhstan (10)
- Macau (12)
- Malaysia (3)
- North Korea (8)
- South Korea (2)
- Sri Lanka (2)
- Thailand (10)
