= Synchronized swimming at the 2012 Summer Olympics =

Coordinates: 51.5402°N 0.0106°W

Synchronized swimming at the Games of the XXX Olympiad
- Venue: Aquatics Centre
- Dates: 5 to 10 August 2012
- Competitors: 100 from 24 nations

Synchronized swimming competitions at the 2012 Summer Olympics in London were held from Sunday 5 August to Friday 10 August, at the London Aquatics Centre. Two medal events were included in the programme — women's duet and women's team — with 100 athletes participating.

== Qualifying system ==
For the team event, the 5 continental champions and 3 further non-qualified teams from an Olympic Qualifying Tournament qualified for the 2012 Summer Olympics. For the duet event, the same teams qualified, plus a further 16 non-qualified teams from the Olympic Qualifying Tournament qualified. The host nation is considered European champion, whilst the best-placed teams from Asia, Africa & Oceania at the 2011 World Aquatics Championships were to be considered as the respective continental champions.

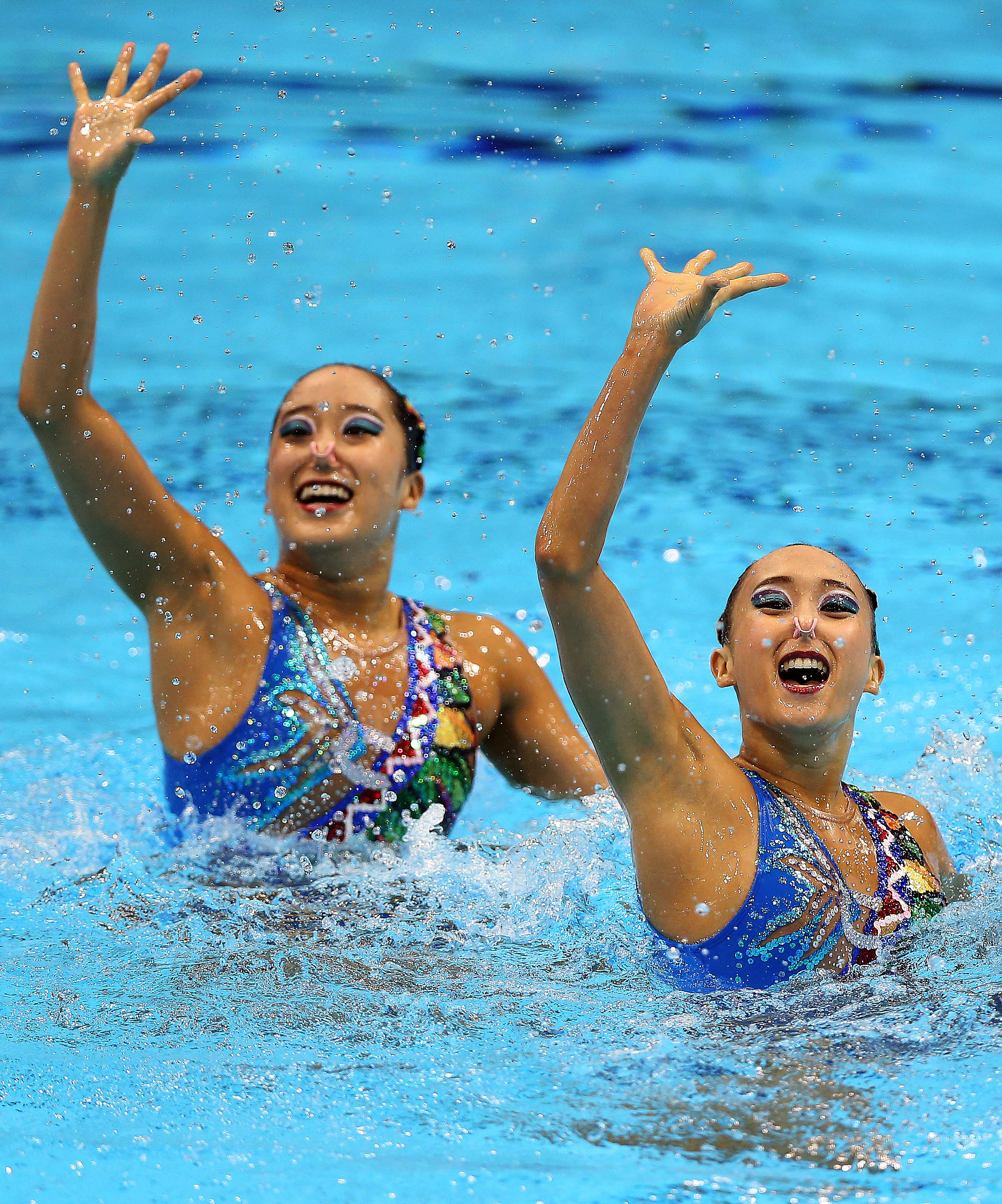
Park Hyun-ha and Park Hyun-sun of South Korea performing their routine at the 2012 Summer Olympics.

Nation	Team	Duet	Athletes
Argentina		X	2
Australia	X	X	8
Austria		X	2
Brazil		X	2
Canada	X	X	8
Czech Republic		X	2
China	X	X	8
France		X	2
Great Britain	X	X	8
Greece		X	2
Egypt	X	X	8
Hungary		X	2
Israel		X	2
Italy		X	2
Japan	X	X	8
Kazakhstan		X	2
Mexico		X	2
North Korea		X	2
Russia	X	X	8
South Korea		X	2
Spain	X	X	8
Switzerland		X	2
Ukraine		X	2
United States		X	2
Total: 24 NOC	8	24	

== Competition schedule ==
TR	Technical Routine	FR	Free Routine	F	Final

Event↓/Date →	Sun 5	Mon 6	Tue 7	Wed 8	Thr 9	Fri 10
Duet	TR	FR	F			
Team					TR	FR

== Medalists ==
Event	Gold	Silver	Bronze
Duet	Natalia Ishchenko and Svetlana Romashina (RUS)	Ona Carbonell and Andrea Fuentes (ESP)	Huang Xuechen and Liu Ou (CHN)
Team	Russia; Anastasia Davydova; Maria Gromova; Natalia Ischenko; Elvira Khasyanova; Daria Korobova; Aleksandra Patskevich; Svetlana Romashina; Alla Shishkina; Angelika Timanina	China; Chang Si; Chen Xiaojun; Huang Xuechen; Jiang Tingting; Jiang Wenwen; Liu Ou; Luo Xi; Sun Wenyan; Wu Yiwen	Spain; Clara Basiana; Alba Cabello; Ona Carbonell; Margalida Crespí; Andrea Fuentes; Thaïs Henríquez; Paula Klamburg; Irene Montrucchio; Laia Pons

=== Medal table ===
Rank	Nation	Gold	Silver	Bronze	Total
1	Russia	2	0	0	2
2	China	0	1	1	2
2	Spain	0	1	1	2
Totals (3 entries)		2	2	2	6
