= Synchronised swimming at the 2011 World Aquatics Championships =

The synchronised swimming competition at the 2011 World Aquatics Championships was held from July 17 to July 23.

== Schedule ==
Date	Time	Round
17 July 2011	09:00	Solo technical routine preliminaries
17 July 2011	14:00	Duet technical routine preliminaries
17 July 2011	17:15	Solo technical routine final
18 July 2011	09:00	Team technical routine preliminaries
18 July 2011	19:00	Duet technical routine final
19 July 2011	09:00	Free routine combination preliminaries
19 July 2011	14:00	Duet free routine preliminaries
19 July 2011	19:00	Team technical routine final
20 July 2011	09:00	Solo free routine preliminaries
20 July 2011	14:00	Team free routine preliminaries
20 July 2011	19:00	Solo free routine final
21 July 2011	19:00	Free routine combination final
22 July 2011	19:00	Duet free routine final
23 July 2011	19:00	Team free routine final

== Medal table ==
* Host nation (China)

Rank	Nation	Gold	Silver	Bronze	Total
1	Russia	7	0	0	7
2	China*	0	6	1	7
3	Spain	0	1	5	6
4	Canada	0	0	1	1
Totals (4 entries)		7	7	7	21

- Record(*)

== Medal summary ==
Event	Gold		Silver		Bronze	
Solo technical routine	Natalia Ishchenko (RUS)	98.300	Huang Xuechen (CHN)	96.500	Andrea Fuentes (ESP)	95.300
Solo free routine	Natalia Ishchenko (RUS)	98.550	Andrea Fuentes (ESP)	96.520	Sun Wenyan (CHN)	95.840
Duet technical routine	Natalia Ishchenko (RUS); Svetlana Romashina (RUS); Alexandra Zueva (RUS) (reserve)	98.200	Huang Xuechen (CHN); Liu Ou (CHN); Luo Xi (CHN) (reserve)	96.500	Ona Carbonell (ESP); Andrea Fuentes (ESP)	95.400
Duet free routine	Natalia Ishchenko (RUS); Svetlana Romashina (RUS); Alexandra Zueva (RUS) (reserve)	98.410	Jiang Tingting (CHN); Jiang Wenwen (CHN)	96.810	Ona Carbonell (ESP); Andrea Fuentes (ESP)	96.500
Team technical routine	Russia; Anastasia Davydova; Maria Gromova; Elvira Khasyanova; Svetlana Kolesnichenko; Daria Korobova; Aleksandra Patskevich; Alla Shishkina; Angelika Timanina; Anisya Olkhova (reserve); Alexandra Zueva (reserve)	98.300	China; Chang Si; Huang Xuechen; Jiang Tingting; Jiang Wenwen; Liu Ou; Luo Xi; Sun Wenyan; Wu Yiwen; Chen Xiaojun (reserve); Guo Li (reserve)	96.800	Spain; Clara Basiana; Alba María Cabello; Ona Carbonell; Margalida Crespí; Andrea Fuentes; Thaïs Henríquez; Paula Klamburg; Cristina Salvador; Sara Gijon (reserve); Irene Montrucchio (reserve)	96.000
Team free routine	Russia; Anastasia Davydova; Natalia Ishchenko; Elvira Khasyanova; Svetlana Kolesnichenko; Daria Korobova; Aleksandra Patskevich; Alla Shishkina; Angelika Timanina; Maria Gromova (reserve)	98.620	China; Chang Si; Huang Xuechen; Jiang Tingting; Jiang Wenwen; Liu Ou; Luo Xi; Sun Wenyan; Wu Yiwen; Chen Xiaojun (reserve); Fan Jiachen (reserve)	96.580	Spain; Clara Basiana; Alba María Cabello; Ona Carbonell; Margalida Crespí; Andrea Fuentes; Thaïs Henríquez; Paula Klamburg; Irene Montrucchio; Sara Gijon (reserve); Cristina Salvador (reserve)	96.090
Free routine combination	Russia; Anastasia Davydova; Maria Gromova; Natalia Ishchenko; Elvira Khasyanova; Svetlana Kolesnichenko; Daria Korobova; Aleksandra Patskevich; Svetlana Romashina; Alla Shishkina; Angelika Timanina; Anisya Olkhova (reserve)	98.470	China; Chang Si; Chen Xiaojun; Fan Jiachen; Guo Li; Huang Xuechen; Liu Ou; Luo Xi; Sun Wenyan; Wu Yiwen; Yu Lele; Jiang Tingting (reserve); Jiang Wenwen (reserve)	96.390	Canada; Genevieve Belanger; Marie-Pier Boudreau Gagnon; Stéphanie Durocher; Jo-Annie Fortin; Chloé Isaac; Stéphanie Leclair; Tracy Little; Élise Marcotte; Karine Thomas; Valerie Welsh; Gabrielle Cardinal (reserve); Erin Willson (reserve)	96.150
