= Synchronised swimming at the 2011 World Aquatics Championships – Team technical routine =

The Team technical routine competition of the Synchronised swimming events at the 2011 World Aquatics Championships was held on July 18 with the preliminary round held and the final on July 19.

== Medalists ==
Gold	Silver	Bronze
Russia; Anastasia Davydova; Maria Gromova; Elvira Khasyanova; Svetlana Kolesnichenko; Daria Korobova; Aleksandra Patskevich; Alla Shishkina; Angelika Timanina; Anisya Olkhova (reserve); Alexandra Zueva (reserve)	China; Chang Si; Huang Xuechen; Jiang Tingting; Jiang Wenwen; Liu Ou; Luo Xi; Sun Wenyan; Wu Yiwen; Chen Xiaojun (reserve); Guo Li (reserve)	Spain; Clara Basiana; Alba María Cabello; Ona Carbonell; Margalida Crespí; Andrea Fuentes; Thaïs Henríquez; Paula Klamburg; Cristina Salvador; Sara Gijon (reserve); Irene Montrucchio (reserve)

== Results ==
The preliminary round was held on July 18. The final was held on July 19.

Green denotes finalists

Rank	Nation	Preliminary		Final	
Rank	Nation	Points	Rank	Points	Rank
1st place, gold medalist(s)	Russia	97.700	1	98.300	1
2nd place, silver medalist(s)	China	96.000	2	96.800	2
3rd place, bronze medalist(s)	Spain	95.700	3	96.000	3
4	Canada	94.000	4	94.400	4
5	Japan	92.800	5	93.100	5
6	Ukraine	92.100	6	92.200	6
7	Italy	90.600	7	90.700	7
8	France	88.700	8	88.600	8
9	United States	88.100	9	87.900	9
10	Great Britain	87.400	10	87.600	10
11	North Korea	85.700	12	86.100	11
12	Brazil	86.200	11	85.600	12
13	Netherlands	83.900	13		
14	Mexico	83.300	14		
14	Kazakhstan	83.300	14		
16	Switzerland	82.300	16		
17	Egypt	77.100	17		
18	Australia	75.200	18		
19	Colombia	75.000	19		
20	Malaysia	72.700	20		
21	Thailand	67.400	21		
22	South Africa	64.400	22		
23	Indonesia	60.000	23		
–	Singapore	DNS			
