= Artistic swimming at the Asian Games =

- Governing bodies: AQUA (World) / AA (Asia)
- Events: 2 (women: 1; mixed: 1)

Games
- 1951; 1954; 1958; 1962; 1966; 1970; 1974; 1978; 1982; 1986; 1990; 1994; 1998; 2002; 2006; 2010; 2014; 2018; 2022; 2026
- Medalists

Artistic swimming has been contested at the Asian Games since the 1994 Games. The current Asiad program has competition in duet and team events, but in past games, solo and combination events were also contested.

== Editions ==
Games	Year	Host city	Best nation
XII	1994	Hiroshima, Japan	Japan
XIII	1998	Bangkok, Thailand	Japan
XIV	2002	Busan, South Korea	Japan
XV	2006	Doha, Qatar	China
XVI	2010	Guangzhou, China	China
XVII	2014	Incheon, South Korea	China
XVIII	2018	Jakarta–Palembang, Indonesia	China
XIX	2022	Hangzhou, China	China
XX	2026	Hamamatsu, Japan	China

== Events ==
Event	94	98	02	06	10	14	18	22	26	Years
Women's solo	X	X	X							3
Women's duet	X	X	X	X	X	X	X	X	X	9
Women's team				X	X	X	X	X	X	6
Women's combination					X	X				2
Total	2	2	2	2	3	3	2	2	2	20

== Medal table ==
Rank	Nation	Gold	Silver	Bronze	Total
1	China (CHN)	14	3	3	20
2	Japan (JPN)	6	14	0	20
3	South Korea (KOR)	0	3	4	7
4	Kazakhstan (KAZ)	0	0	9	9
5	North Korea (PRK)	0	0	4	4
Totals (5 entries)		20	20	20	60

== Participating nations ==
Nation	94	98	02	06	10	14	18	22	Years
China	3	3	3	9	12	12	10	10	8
Hong Kong		1	2			8	8	10	5
Indonesia							8		1
Japan	2	2	2	10	10	11	9	9	8
Kazakhstan	2	2	2	10	10	11	9	10	8
Macau			3	7	12	10	10	10	6
Malaysia				10	3	3	3		4
North Korea				7	8	10	9	10	5
Singapore							8	10	2
South Korea	2	3	2	2	2	2	10	2	8
Sri Lanka				9	2				2
Thailand		3			10			10	3
Uzbekistan	2	2	2	3		9	10	3	7
Number of nations	5	7	7	9	9	9	11	10	
Number of athletes	11	16	16	67	69	76	94	84	
