= Synchronised swimming at the 2011 World Aquatics Championships – Free routine combination =

The Free routine combination competition of the Synchronised swimming events at the 2011 World Aquatics Championships was held on July 19 with the preliminary round and the final on 21 July.

== Medalists ==
Gold	Silver	Bronze
Russia; Anastasia Davydova; Maria Gromova; Natalia Ishchenko; Elvira Khasyanova; Svetlana Kolesnichenko; Daria Korobova; Aleksandra Patskevich; Svetlana Romashina; Alla Shishkina; Angelika Timanina; Anisya Olkhova (reserve)	China; Chang Si; Chen Xiaojun; Fan Jiachen; Guo Li; Huang Xuechen; Liu Ou; Luo Xi; Sun Wenyan; Wu Yiwen; Yu Lele; Jiang Tingting (reserve); Jiang Wenwen (reserve)	Canada; Genevieve Belanger; Marie-Pier Boudreau Gagnon; Stéphanie Durocher; Jo-Annie Fortin; Chloé Isaac; Stéphanie Leclair; Tracy Little; Élise Marcotte; Karine Thomas; Valerie Welsh; Gabrielle Cardinal (reserve); Erin Willson (reserve)

== Results ==
The preliminary round was held on July 19. The final was held on July 21.

Green denotes finalists

Rank	Nation	Preliminary		Final	
Rank	Nation	Points	Rank	Points	Rank
1st place, gold medalist(s)	Russia	97.970	1	98.470	1
2nd place, silver medalist(s)	China	96.320	2	96.390	2
3rd place, bronze medalist(s)	Canada	95.250	4	96.150	3
4	Spain	95.640	3	95.740	4
5	Ukraine	92.410	5	92.080	5
6	Italy	90.650	6	90.550	6
7	Great Britain	87.310	7	87.760	7
8	North Korea	84.340	9	86.340	8
9	Netherlands	84.430	8	85.440	9
10	Kazakhstan	83.680	10	82.610	10
11	Macau	71.570	11	70.610	11
12	Singapore	70.400	12	70.240	12
13	Thailand	69.700	13		
14	Indonesia	65.780	14		
15	Hong Kong	65.540	15		
