= Synchronized swimming at the 2006 Asian Games – Women's team =

Women's team at the 2006 Asian Games
- Venue: Hamad Aquatic Centre
- Date: 9 December 2006
- Competitors: 62 from 7 nations

Medalists
gold medal	China; Gu Beibei, Jiang Tingting, Jiang Wenwen, Liu Ou, Sun Qiuting, Wang Na, Wu Yiwen, Zhang Xiaohuan, Zhu Zheng
silver medal	Japan; Ai Aoki, Reiko Fujimori, Saho Harada; Hiromi Kobayashi, Erika Komura, Takako Konishi, Ayako Matsumura, Emiko Suzuki, Erina Suzuki, Masako Tachibana
bronze medal	North Korea; Hwang Kum-song, Kim Ok-gyong, Kim Yong-mi, So Un-byol, Tokgo Pom, Wang Ok-gyong, Yun Hui

The women's duet synchronized swimming competition at the 2006 Asian Games in Doha was held on 9 December at the Hamad Aquatic Centre.

== Schedule ==
All times are Arabia Standard Time (UTC+03:00)

Date	Time	Event
Saturday, 9 December 2006	10:00	Technical routine
Saturday, 9 December 2006	18:00	Free routine

== Results ==
Legend

- FR — Reserve in free
- RR — Reserve in technical and free
- TR — Reserve in technical

Rank	Team	Technical (50%)	Free (50%)	Total
1st place, gold medalist(s)	China (CHN); Gu Beibei; Jiang Tingting; Jiang Wenwen; Liu Ou (TR); Sun Qiuting; Wang Na; Wu Yiwen (FR); Zhang Xiaohuan; Zhu Zheng	48.000	48.584	96.584
2nd place, silver medalist(s)	Japan (JPN); Ai Aoki (TR); Reiko Fujimori; Saho Harada (FR); Hiromi Kobayashi; Erika Komura; Takako Konishi; Ayako Matsumura; Emiko Suzuki (RR); Erina Suzuki; Masako Tachibana	47.917	48.167	96.084
3rd place, bronze medalist(s)	North Korea (PRK); Hwang Kum-song; Kim Ok-gyong; Kim Yong-mi; So Un-byol; Tokgo Pom; Wang Ok-gyong; Yun Hui	42.750	43.750	86.500
4	Kazakhstan (KAZ); Sholpan Adilbayeva; Aigerim Issayeva; Ainur Kerey; Anna Kokareva (RR); Anna Kulkina; Mariya Novikova (RR); Arna Toktagan; Amina Yermakhanova; Zamira Zainitdinova; Aigerim Zhexembinova	41.834	42.084	83.918
5	Malaysia (MAS); Katrina Abdul Hadi (FR); Irene Chong (TR); Zyanne Lee; Jillian Ng; Png Hui Chuen; Tan May Mei; Mandy Yeap (TR); Yeo Pei Ling; Yshai Poo Voon (FR); Yshai Poo Yee	40.667	42.000	82.667
6	Macau (MAC); Au Ieong Sin Ieng; Cheong Ka Ieng; Lok Ka Man; Sin Wan I Tin Pek Han; Wong Cheng U Wong I Teng	37.500	38.000	75.500
7	Sri Lanka (SRI); Elisha Gomes; Shahili Gomes; Rovini Illukkumbura; Piyumi Katipearachchi; Lankatilaka Kithsiri; Salpadoru Perera (RR); Deethri Samarajeewa; Gayani Warnapura; Hashani Warnapura	28.250	28.667	56.917
