= Synchronized swimming at the 2010 Asian Games – Women's team =

Women's team at the 2010 Asian Games
- Venue: Foshan Aquatics Center
- Date: 20 November 2010
- Competitors: 47 from 5 nations

Medalists
gold medal	China; Chang Si, Chen Xiaojun, Huang Xuechen, Jiang Tingting, Jiang Wenwen, Liu Ou, Luo Xi, Sun Wenyan, Wu Yiwen, Yu Lele
silver medal	Japan; Yumi Adachi, Miho Arai, Aika Hakoyama, Yukiko Inui, Mayo Itoyama, Chisa Kobayashi, Mai Nakamura, Misa Sugiyama, Yui Ueminami, Kurumi Yoshida
bronze medal	North Korea; Jang Hyang-mi, Kim Jin-gyong, Kim Jong-hui, Kim Ok-gyong, Kim Su-hyang, Kim Yong-mi, So Un-byol, Wang Ok-gyong

The women's team event at the 2010 Asian Games in Guangzhou, China, took place at the Foshan Aquatics Center on 20 November.

== Schedule ==
All times are China Standard Time (UTC+08:00)

Date	Time	Event
Saturday, 20 November 2010	10:00	Technical routine
Saturday, 20 November 2010	19:30	Free routine

== Results ==
Legend

- FR — Reserve in free
- RR — Reserve in technical and free
- TR — Reserve in technical

Rank	Team	Technical	Free	Total
1st place, gold medalist(s)	China (CHN); Chang Si; Chen Xiaojun (RR); Huang Xuechen; Jiang Tingting; Jiang Wenwen; Liu Ou; Luo Xi; Sun Wenyan; Wu Yiwen; Yu Lele (RR)	95.375	96.625	192.000
2nd place, silver medalist(s)	Japan (JPN); Yumi Adachi; Miho Arai (TR); Aika Hakoyama; Yukiko Inui; Mayo Itoyama; Chisa Kobayashi; Mai Nakamura; Misa Sugiyama (RR); Yui Ueminami; Kurumi Yoshida (FR)	92.750	93.375	186.125
3rd place, bronze medalist(s)	North Korea (PRK); Jang Hyang-mi; Kim Jin-gyong; Kim Jong-hui; Kim Ok-gyong; Kim Su-hyang; Kim Yong-mi; So Un-byol; Wang Ok-gyong	86.375	86.625	173.000
4	Thailand (THA); Thinatta Kanchanakanti (TR); Arthittaya Kittithanatphum; Natchanat Krasachol; Nantaya Polsen; Thanyaluck Puttisiriroj; Chanamon Sangakul; Busarin Tanabutchot (FR); Nujarin Tanabutchot; Ravisara Vathagavorakul	68.500	71.625	140.125
5	Macau (MAC); Ao Ka U Au Ieong Sin Ieng; Chan Lok Ian (RR); Chang Si Wai; Cheong Ka Ieng; Gou Cheng I Kou Chin; Lo Wai Lam; Wong Cheng U (RR); Wong I Teng	65.500	70.375	135.875
