= Synchronised swimming at the 2011 World Aquatics Championships – Team free routine =

The Team free routine competition of the Synchronised swimming events at the 2011 World Aquatics Championships was held on July 20 with the preliminary round and the final on 23 July.

== Medalists ==
Gold	Silver	Bronze
Russia; Anastasia Davydova; Natalia Ishchenko; Elvira Khasyanova; Svetlana Kolesnichenko; Daria Korobova; Aleksandra Patskevich; Alla Shishkina; Angelika Timanina; Mariya Gromova (reserve)	China; Chang Si; Fan Jiachen; Huang Xuechen; Jiang Tingting; Jiang Wenwen; Liu Ou; Luo Xi; Wu Yiwen; Chen Xiaojun (reserve); Sun Wenyan (reserve)	Spain; Clara Basiana; Alba María Cabello; Ona Carbonell; Margalida Crespí; Andrea Fuentes; Thaïs Henríquez; Paula Klamburg; Irene Montrucchio; Sara Gijon (reserve); Cristina Salvador (reserve)

== Results ==
The preliminary round was held on July 20. The final was held on July 23.

Green denotes finalists

Rank	Nation	Preliminary		Final	
Rank	Nation	Points	Rank	Points	Rank
1st place, gold medalist(s)	Russia	98.440	1	98.620	1
2nd place, silver medalist(s)	China	96.440	2	96.580	2
3rd place, bronze medalist(s)	Spain	96.030	3	96.090	3
4	Canada	95.280	4	95.490	4
5	Japan	92.540	5	92.860	5
6	Ukraine	91.960	6	92.740	6
7	Italy	91.090	7	90.870	7
8	France	88.970	8	87.840	8
9	Great Britain	87.090	10	87.280	9
10	United States	87.780	9	86.800	10
11	Mexico	85.110	12	85.760	11
12	Brazil	85.770	11	85.160	12
13	Netherlands	85.070	13		
14	Switzerland	83.640	14		
15	Egypt	78.200	15		
16	Colombia	76.780	16		
17	Australia	76.720	17		
18	Malaysia	73.900	18		
19	Macau	68.690	19		
20	Thailand	67.430	20		
21	Indonesia	65.050	21		
22	Singapore	64.780	22		
23	Hong Kong	63.510	23		
24	South Africa	60.290	24		
