= Synchronized swimming at the 2006 Asian Games =

- Venue: Hamad Aquatic Centre
- Dates: 8–9 December 2006
- Competitors: 67 from 9 nations

Synchronized swimming was contested from December 8 to December 9 at the 2006 Asian Games in Doha, Qatar, with all events taking place at the Hamad Aquatic Centre. Starting in this edition the solo event was replaced by the team event. China won both gold medals and topped the medal table, Japan finished second with two silver medals. North Korea and Kazakhstan won one bronze medal each.

== Schedule ==
T	Technical routine	F	Free routine

Event↓/Date →	8th Fri		9th Sat	
Women's duet	T	F		
Women's team			T	F

== Medalists ==
Event	Gold	Silver	Bronze
Duet	China; Jiang Tingting; Jiang Wenwen; Wang Na	Japan; Saho Harada; Ayako Matsumura; Emiko Suzuki	Kazakhstan; Ainur Kerey; Anna Kulkina; Arna Toktagan
Team	China; Gu Beibei; Jiang Tingting; Jiang Wenwen; Liu Ou; Sun Qiuting; Wang Na; Wu Yiwen; Zhang Xiaohuan; Zhu Zheng	Japan; Ai Aoki; Reiko Fujimori; Saho Harada; Hiromi Kobayashi; Erika Komura; Takako Konishi; Ayako Matsumura; Emiko Suzuki; Erina Suzuki; Masako Tachibana	North Korea; Hwang Kum-song; Kim Ok-gyong; Kim Yong-mi; So Un-byol; Tokgo Pom; Wang Ok-gyong; Yun Hui

== Medal table ==
Rank	Nation	Gold	Silver	Bronze	Total
1	China (CHN)	2	0	0	2
2	Japan (JPN)	0	2	0	2
3	Kazakhstan (KAZ)	0	0	1	1
3	North Korea (PRK)	0	0	1	1
Totals (4 entries)		2	2	2	6

== Participating nations ==
A total of 67 athletes from 9 nations competed in synchronized swimming at the 2006 Asian Games:

- China (9)
- Japan (10)
- Kazakhstan (10)
- Macau (7)
- Malaysia (10)
- North Korea (7)
- South Korea (2)
- Sri Lanka (9)
- Uzbekistan (3)
