= Kazakhstan at the 2011 World Aquatics Championships =

Sporting event delegation

Flag of Kazakhstan

Kazakhstan competed at the 2011 World Aquatics Championships in Shanghai, China between July 16 and 31, 2011.

== Open water swimming ==
Men

Athlete	Event	Final	
Athlete	Event	Time	Position
Bekshe Zhumagali	Men's 5km	1:02:31.9	43
Bekshe Zhumagali	Men's 10km	2:18.29.3	61
Yuriy Kudinov	Men's 10km	1:54:45.1	13
Yuriy Kudinov	Men's 25km	5:13:08.6	9

== Swimming ==
Kazakhstan qualified 2 swimmers.

Men

Athlete	Event	Heats		Semifinals		Final	
Athlete	Event	Time	Rank	Time	Rank	Time	Rank
Vladislav Polyakov	Men's 50m Breaststroke	28.00	16 Q	27.81	14	did not advance	
Vladislav Polyakov	Men's 100m Breaststroke	1:01.85	38	did not advance			
Vladislav Polyakov	Men's 200m Breaststroke	2:15.70	33	did not advance			

Women

Athlete	Event	Heats		Semifinals		Final	
Athlete	Event	Time	Rank	Time	Rank	Time	Rank
Yekaterina Rudenko	Women's 50m Backstroke	29.76	38	did not advance			
Yekaterina Rudenko	Women's 100m Backstroke	1:03.78	40	did not advance			

== Synchronised swimming ==
Kazakhstan has qualified 12 athletes in synchronised swimming.

Women

Athlete	Event	Preliminary		Final	
Athlete	Event	Points	Rank	Points	Rank
Anna Kulkina	Solo Technical Routine	83.400	13	did not advance	
Ainur Kerey	Solo Free Routine	DNS		did not advance	
Anna Kulkina; Aigerim Zhexembinova	Duet Technical Routine	85.400	17	did not advance	
Anna Kulkina; Aigerim Zhexembinova	Duet Free Routine	85.490	17	did not advance	
Aigerim Anarbayeva; Aigerim Issayeva; Ainur Kerey; Tatyana Kukharskaya; Aisulu Nauryzbayeva; Alexandra Nemich; Yekaterina Nemich; Amina Yermakhanova	Team Technical Routine	83.300	14	did not advance	
Aigerim Anarbayeva; Aigerim Issayeva; Ainur Kerey; Tatyana Kukharskaya; Anna Kulkina; Aisulu Nauryzbayeva; Alexandra Nemich; Yekaterina Nemich; Amina Yermakhanova; Aigerim Zhexembinova	Free Routine Combination	83.680	10 Q	82.610	10

Reserves

- Anastassiya Sholkova
- Kristina Tynybayeva

== Water polo ==
=== Men ===
Team Roster

- Alexandr Shvedov
- Sergey Gubarev
- Murat Shakenov
- Roman Pilipenko
- Alexey Panfili
- Alexandr Fenochko
- Alexandr Axenov
- Rustam Ukumanov
- Evgeniy Zhilyayev – Captain
- Mikhail Ruday
- Ravil Manafov
- Nikita Kokorin
- Alexey Demchenko

==== Group A ====
Team	Played	W	D	L	GF	GA	GD	Pts
Hungary	3	3	0	0	39	26	+13	6
Montenegro	3	2	0	1	35	23	+12	4
Spain	3	1	0	2	36	26	+10	2
Kazakhstan	3	0	0	3	15	50	–35	0

July 18, 2011; 10:50	Report	Kazakhstan	5–18	Spain	Shanghai Oriental Sports Center, Shanghai; Attendance: 550; Referees: Cabral (BRA), Rotsart (USA)
July 18, 2011; 10:50	Report	Score by quarters: 1–3, 0–4, 2–5, 2–6			Shanghai Oriental Sports Center, Shanghai; Attendance: 550; Referees: Cabral (BRA), Rotsart (USA)
July 18, 2011; 10:50	Report	Zhilyayev 3	Goals	four players 3	Shanghai Oriental Sports Center, Shanghai; Attendance: 550; Referees: Cabral (BRA), Rotsart (USA)

July 20, 2011; 19:40	Report	Hungary	16–5	Kazakhstan	Shanghai Oriental Sports Center, Shanghai; Attendance: 600; Referees: Peris (CRO), Deslieres (CAN)
July 20, 2011; 19:40	Report	Score by quarters: 4–1, 4–0, 3–2, 5–2			Shanghai Oriental Sports Center, Shanghai; Attendance: 600; Referees: Peris (CRO), Deslieres (CAN)
July 20, 2011; 19:40	Report	four players 3	Goals	Zhilyayev 2	Shanghai Oriental Sports Center, Shanghai; Attendance: 600; Referees: Peris (CRO), Deslieres (CAN)

July 22, 2011; 18:20	Report	Kazakhstan	5–16	Montenegro	Shanghai Oriental Sports Center, Shanghai; Attendance: 450; Referees: Koryzna (POL), Gonzalez (PUR)
July 22, 2011; 18:20	Report	Score by quarters: 2–5, 0–5, 0–2, 3–4			Shanghai Oriental Sports Center, Shanghai; Attendance: 450; Referees: Koryzna (POL), Gonzalez (PUR)
July 22, 2011; 18:20	Report	Zhilyayev 3	Goals	Radović 4	Shanghai Oriental Sports Center, Shanghai; Attendance: 450; Referees: Koryzna (POL), Gonzalez (PUR)

==== Classification 13–16 ====
July 24, 2011; 09:30	Report	Kazakhstan	8–7	China	Shanghai Oriental Sports Center, Shanghai; Attendance: 1,000; Referees: Alexandrescu (ROU), Williams (NZL)
July 24, 2011; 09:30	Report	Score by quarters: 2–2, 3–2, 2–0, 1–3			Shanghai Oriental Sports Center, Shanghai; Attendance: 1,000; Referees: Alexandrescu (ROU), Williams (NZL)
July 24, 2011; 09:30	Report	Pilipenko, Panfili 2	Goals	Liang, Xie 2	Shanghai Oriental Sports Center, Shanghai; Attendance: 1,000; Referees: Alexandrescu (ROU), Williams (NZL)

==== Thirteenth place game ====
July 26, 2011; 10:00	Report	Kazakhstan	9–7	Brazil	Shanghai Oriental Sports Center, Shanghai; Attendance: 250; Referees: Pinker (RSA), Makita (JPN)
July 26, 2011; 10:00	Report	Score by quarters: 3–0, 1–3, 2–2, 3–2			Shanghai Oriental Sports Center, Shanghai; Attendance: 250; Referees: Pinker (RSA), Makita (JPN)
July 26, 2011; 10:00	Report	Zhilyayev 3	Goals	Silva 2	Shanghai Oriental Sports Center, Shanghai; Attendance: 250; Referees: Pinker (RSA), Makita (JPN)

=== Women ===
Team Roster

- Galina Rytova
- Lyudmila Chegodayeva
- Aizhan Akilbayeva
- Anna Turova
- Kamila Zakirova
- Kamila Marina
- Natalya Alexandrova
- Darya Vassilyeva
- Agata Tnasheva
- Marina Gritsenko
- Yelena Chebotova
- Assem Mussarova
- Yelena Starodubtseva

==== Group A ====
Team	Pld	W	D	L	GF	GA	GD	Pts
United States	3	2	1	0	37	18	+19	5
Netherlands	3	1	2	0	29	19	+10	4
Hungary	3	1	1	1	37	31	+6	3
Kazakhstan	3	0	0	3	13	48	−35	0

July 17, 2011; 10:50	Report	Kazakhstan	6–21	Hungary	Shanghai Oriental Sports Center, Shanghai; Attendance: 700; Referees: Ni Shi Wei (CHN); Tulga (TUR)
July 17, 2011; 10:50	Report	Score by quarters: 3–5, 0–6, 3–6, 0–4			Shanghai Oriental Sports Center, Shanghai; Attendance: 700; Referees: Ni Shi Wei (CHN); Tulga (TUR)
July 17, 2011; 10:50	Report	Vassilyeva, Gritsenko 2	Goals	Keszthelyi 5	Shanghai Oriental Sports Center, Shanghai; Attendance: 700; Referees: Ni Shi Wei (CHN); Tulga (TUR)

July 19, 2011; 19:40	Report	Netherlands	13–3	Kazakhstan	Shanghai Oriental Sports Center, Shanghai; Attendance: 500; Referees: Cabral (BRA), Wengenroth (SUO)
July 19, 2011; 19:40	Report	Score by quarters: 4–1, 3–1, 3–0, 3–1			Shanghai Oriental Sports Center, Shanghai; Attendance: 500; Referees: Cabral (BRA), Wengenroth (SUO)
July 19, 2011; 19:40	Report	Vermeer 4	Goals	Gritsenko 2	Shanghai Oriental Sports Center, Shanghai; Attendance: 500; Referees: Cabral (BRA), Wengenroth (SUO)

July 21, 2011; 17:00	Report	Kazakhstan	4–14	United States	Shanghai Oriental Sports Center, Shanghai; Attendance: 600; Referees: Ciric (SRB), Menendez (CUB)
July 21, 2011; 17:00	Report	Score by quarters: 3–4, 0–4, 0–4, 1–2			Shanghai Oriental Sports Center, Shanghai; Attendance: 600; Referees: Ciric (SRB), Menendez (CUB)
July 21, 2011; 17:00	Report	Chebotova 2	Goals	Dries, Craig 3	Shanghai Oriental Sports Center, Shanghai; Attendance: 600; Referees: Ciric (SRB), Menendez (CUB)

==== Classification 13–16 ====
July 23, 2011; 09:30	Report	Kazakhstan	14–13	Uzbekistan	Shanghai Oriental Sports Center, Shanghai; Attendance: 450; Referees: Gonzalez (PUR), Juhaz (HUN)
July 23, 2011; 09:30	Report	Score by quarters: 4–2, 2–4, 4–2, 4–5			Shanghai Oriental Sports Center, Shanghai; Attendance: 450; Referees: Gonzalez (PUR), Juhaz (HUN)
July 23, 2011; 09:30	Report	Vassilyeva 4	Goals	Halikova 8	Shanghai Oriental Sports Center, Shanghai; Attendance: 450; Referees: Gonzalez (PUR), Juhaz (HUN)

==== Thirteenth place game ====
July 25, 2011; 10:00	Report	Kazakhstan	9–5	Brazil	Shanghai Oriental Sports Center, Shanghai; Attendance: 250; Referees: Flahive (AUS), Reemnet (NED)
July 25, 2011; 10:00	Report	Score by quarters: 2–1, 2–2, 2–0, 3–2			Shanghai Oriental Sports Center, Shanghai; Attendance: 250; Referees: Flahive (AUS), Reemnet (NED)
July 25, 2011; 10:00	Report	Vassilyeva, Chebotova 3	Goals	Zablith, Coutinho 2	Shanghai Oriental Sports Center, Shanghai; Attendance: 250; Referees: Flahive (AUS), Reemnet (NED)
