= Synchronised swimming at the 2009 World Aquatics Championships – Team technical routine =

Following are the results of the team technical routine synchronised swimming competition at the 2009 World Aquatics Championships held in Rome, Italy from July 17 to August 2, 2009.

== Medalist ==
Gold	Silver	Bronze
Russia; Daria Korobova; Anna Nasekina; Aleksandra Patskevich; Victoria Shestakovich; Alla Shishkina; Elizaveta Stepanova; Angelika Timanina; Sofia Volkova	Spain; Ona Carbonell; Raquel Corral; Margalida Crespí; Andrea Fuentes; Thaïs Henríquez; Paula Klamburg; Irina Rodríguez; Cristina Salvador	China; Huang Xuechen; Jiang Tingting; Jiang Wenwen; Liu Ou; Luo Xi; Wang Na; Wu Yiwen; Zhang Xiaohuan

== Results ==
Green denotes finalists

Rank	Nation	Preliminary		Final	
Rank	Nation	Points	Rank	Points	Rank
1st place, gold medalist(s)	Russia	98.000	1	98.833	1
2nd place, silver medalist(s)	Spain	97.500	2	97.833	2
3rd place, bronze medalist(s)	China	96.167	3	96.667	3
4	Canada	95.500	4	95.833	4
5	Japan	95.000	5	95.167	5
6	Italy	94.333	6	94.666	6
7	United States	93.166	7	93.333	7
8	Ukraine	92.333	8	92.500	8
9	France	91.000	9	91.167	9
10	North Korea	87.667	10	88.000	10
11	Brazil	86.834	11	86.833	11
12	Netherlands	85.834	12	86.167	12
13	Belarus	85.500	13		
14	Mexico	85.500	14		
15	Great Britain	84.666	15		
16	Switzerland	84.167	16		
17	Egypt	80.334	17		
