= Synchronized swimming at the 2010 Asian Games – Women's duet =

Women's duet at the 2010 Asian Games
- Venue: Foshan Aquatics Center
- Dates: 19 November 2010
- Competitors: 23 from 9 nations

Medalists
gold medal	Jiang Tingting; Jiang Wenwen	China
silver medal	Yukiko Inui; Chisa Kobayashi	Japan
bronze medal	Park Hyun-ha; Park Hyun-sun	South Korea

The women's duet event at the 2010 Asian Games in Guangzhou, China, took place at the Foshan Aquatics Center on 19 November.

== Schedule ==
All times are China Standard Time (UTC+08:00)

Date	Time	Event
Friday, 19 November 2010	10:00	Technical routine
Friday, 19 November 2010	19:30	Free routine

== Results ==
Legend

- FR — Reserve in free
- RR — Reserve in technical and free
- TR — Reserve in technical

Rank	Team	Technical	Free	Total
1st place, gold medalist(s)	China (CHN); Jiang Tingting; Jiang Wenwen	96.375	97.000	193.375
2nd place, silver medalist(s)	Japan (JPN); Yukiko Inui; Chisa Kobayashi	93.375	93.500	186.875
3rd place, bronze medalist(s)	South Korea (KOR); Park Hyun-ha; Park Hyun-sun	88.000	89.875	177.875
4	North Korea (PRK); Kim Su-hyang (RR); Kim Yong-mi; Wang Ok-gyong	85.375	86.250	171.625
5	Kazakhstan (KAZ); Anna Kulkina (TR); Amina Yermakhanova; Aigerim Zhexembinova (FR)	85.000	85.500	170.500
6	Malaysia (MAS); Katrina Abdul Hadi (FR); Zyanne Lee (TR); Png Hui Chuen	77.250	77.500	154.750
7	Thailand (THA); Arthittaya Kittithanatphum; Natchanat Krasachol (RR); Nantaya Polsen	71.875	73.625	145.500
8	Macau (MAC); Au Ieong Sin Ieng; Cheong Ka Ieng (TR); Kou Chin (FR)	70.500	71.625	142.125
9	Sri Lanka (SRI); Elisha Gomes; Piyumi Katipearachchi	61.250	63.250	124.500
