= Synchronised swimming at the 2013 Summer Universiade =

Synchronised swimming at the XXVII Summer Universiade
- Venue: various
- Dates: July 5, 2013 – July 9, 2013

Synchronised swimming was contested at the 2013 Summer Universiade from July 5 to 9 in Kazan, Russia. Synchronised swimming made its debut at the 2013 Summer Universiade.

== Medal summary ==
=== Medal table ===
Rank	Nation	Gold	Silver	Bronze	Total
1	Russia (RUS)*	4	0	0	4
2	Japan (JPN)	0	4	0	4
3	Italy (ITA)	0	0	2	2
4	Hungary (HUN)	0	0	1	1
4	United States (USA)	0	0	1	1
Totals (5 entries)		4	4	4	12

=== Medal events ===
Event	Gold	Silver	Bronze
Solo	Svetlana Romashina; Russia	Yukiko Inui; Japan	Linda Cerruti; Italy
Duet	Russia; Svetlana Kolesnichenko; Svetlana Romashina	Japan; Yukiko Inui; Risako Mitsui	Italy; Linda Cerruti; Costanza Ferro
Team	Russia; Vlada Chigireva; Svetlana Kolesnichenko; Daria Korobova; Alexandra Patskevich; Elena Prokofyeva; Alla Shishkina; Maria Shurochkina; Angelika Timanina	Japan; Chisato Haga; Aika Hakoyama; Mayo Itoyama; Hikaru Kazumori; Kei Marumo; Risako Mitsui; Kanami Nakamaki; Misa Sugiyama	United States; Madison Crocker; Morgan Fuller; Megan Hansley; Mariya Koroleva; Michelle Moore; Olivia Morgan; Rosilyn Tegart; Khadija Zanotto
Combined	Russia; Vlada Chigireva; Mikhaela Kalancha; Daria Korobova; Anisya Olkhova; Alexandra Patskevich; Elena Prokofyeva; Alla Shishkina; Maria Shurochkina; Angelika Timanina; Alexandra Zueva	Japan; Chisato Haga; Aika Hakoyama; Yukiko Inui; Mayo Itoyama; Hikaru Kazumori; Kei Marumo; Risako Mitsui; Kanami Nakamaki; Misa Sugiyama	Hungary; Lili Edit Blasko; Eperke Kitti Fazekas; Julia Kiss; Kinga Koltai; Zsuzsana Kovacs; Reka Laszlo; Zsofia Laszlo; Sara Tringer; Csilla Vandor
