= Synchronised swimming at the 2009 World Aquatics Championships – Team free routine =

The following are the results of the team free routine synchronised swimming competition at the 2009 World Aquatics Championships held in Rome, Italy from July 17 to August 2, 2009.

== Medalist ==
Gold	Silver	Bronze
Russia; Anastasia Davydova; Natalia Ishchenko; Daria Korobova; Anna Nasekina; Aleksandra Patskevich; Svetlana Romashina; Alla Shishkina; Angelika Timanina	Spain; Ona Carbonell; Raquel Corral; Margalida Crespí; Andrea Fuentes; Thaïs Henríquez; Paula Klamburg; Gemma Mengual; Irina Rodríguez	China; Huang Xuechen; Jiang Tingting; Jiang Wenwen; Liu Ou; Luo Xi; Wang Na; Wu Yiwen; Zhang Xiaohuan

== Results ==
Green denotes finalists

Rank	Nation	Preliminary		Final	
Rank	Nation	Points	Rank	Points	Rank
1st place, gold medalist(s)	Russia	99.000	1	99.167	1
2nd place, silver medalist(s)	Spain	98.000	2	98.167	2
3rd place, bronze medalist(s)	China	97.666	3	97.167	3
4	Canada	96.000	4	96.000	4
5	Italy	94.833	5	95.000	5
6	Japan	93.834	6	94.000	6
7	France	92.000	9	93.000	7
8	Ukraine	92.500	7	92.667	8
9	United States	92.167	8	91.667	9
10	North Korea	88.666	10	89.667	10
10	Great Britain	88.167	11	89.667	10
12	Brazil	87.834	12	88.333	12
13	Mexico	85.167	13		
13	Belarus	85.167	13		
15	Netherlands	84.834	15		
16	Switzerland	84.334	16		
17	Germany	79.833	17		
18	Egypt	77.333	18		
