= Synchronized swimming at the 2010 Asian Games – Women's combination =

Women's combination at the 2010 Asian Games
- Venue: Foshan Aquatics Center
- Date: 21 November 2010
- Competitors: 54 from 5 nations

Medalists
gold medal	China; Chang Si, Chen Xiaojun, Fan Jiachen, Huang Xuechen, Jiang Tingting, Jiang Wenwen, Liu Ou, Luo Xi, Shi Xin, Sun Wenyan, Wu Yiwen, Yu Lele
silver medal	Japan; Yumi Adachi, Miho Arai, Aika Hakoyama, Yukiko Inui, Mayo Itoyama, Chisa Kobayashi, Mai Nakamura, Misa Sugiyama, Yui Ueminami, Kurumi Yoshida
bronze medal	Kazakhstan; Aigerim Anarbayeva, Aigerim Issayeva, Ainur Kerey, Tatyana Kukharskaya, Anna Kulkina, Aisulu Nauryzbayeva, Alexandra Nemich, Yekaterina Nemich, Amina Yermakhanova, Aigerim Zhexembinova

The women's combination event at the 2010 Asian Games in Guangzhou, China, took place at the Foshan Aquatics Center on 21 November.

== Schedule ==
All times are China Standard Time (UTC+08:00)

Date	Time	Event
Sunday, 21 November 2010	16:00	Final

== Results ==
Legend

- R — Reserve

Rank	Team	Score
1st place, gold medalist(s)	China (CHN); Chang Si; Chen Xiaojun (R); Fan Jiachen (R); Huang Xuechen; Jiang Tingting; Jiang Wenwen; Liu Ou; Luo Xi; Shi Xin; Sun Wenyan; Wu Yiwen; Yu Lele	97.125
2nd place, silver medalist(s)	Japan (JPN); Yumi Adachi; Miho Arai; Aika Hakoyama; Yukiko Inui; Mayo Itoyama; Chisa Kobayashi; Mai Nakamura; Misa Sugiyama; Yui Ueminami; Kurumi Yoshida	94.000
3rd place, bronze medalist(s)	Kazakhstan (KAZ); Aigerim Anarbayeva; Aigerim Issayeva; Ainur Kerey; Tatyana Kukharskaya; Anna Kulkina; Aisulu Nauryzbayeva; Alexandra Nemich; Yekaterina Nemich; Amina Yermakhanova; Aigerim Zhexembinova	85.375
4	Macau (MAC); Ao Ka U Au Ieong Sin Ieng; Chan Lok Ian; Chang Si Wai; Cheong Ka Ieng; Gou Cheng I Ho Sin I Kou Chin; Leong Wa Hei (R); Lo Wai Lam; Wong Cheng U (R); Wong I Teng	70.750
5	Thailand (THA); Thinatta Kanchanakanti; Arthittaya Kittithanatphum; Natchanat Krasachol; Nantaya Polsen; Thanyaluck Puttisiriroj; Chanamon Sangakul; Busarin Tanabutchot; Nujarin Tanabutchot; Manisorn Tritipetsuwan (R); Ravisara Vathagavorakul	70.250
