= Yiwen =

Yiwen may refer to:

- The Crown Prince Yiwen, a posthumous name of Zhu Biao of the Ming dynasty
- The Yiwen Leiju, a medieval Chinese encyclopedia
- Wu Yiwen, a Chinese swimmer
