= Katie Dawkins =

British synchronised swimmer

Katie Chapman (n.Dawkins)
Personal information
- Full name: Katrina Elizabeth Chapman
- National team: United Kingdom
- Born: Katrina Elizabeth Dawkins; 20 August 1988 (age 37) Bristol, England
- Height: 1.75 m (5 ft 9 in)

Sport
- Sport: Synchronised swimming
- Club: Bristol Central SC
- Updated on 23 May 2015

Katrina Elizabeth "Katie" Chapman (née Dawkins, born 20 August 1988) is a competitor in synchronised swimming who represented Great Britain in the team event at the 2012 London Olympics.
