= Mai Nakamura =

Mai Nakamura may refer to the following Olympic medalists from Japan:

- Mai Nakamura (backstroke swimmer) (中村 真衣, born 1979), Japanese swimmer
- Mai Nakamura (synchronised swimmer) (中村 麻衣, born 1989), Japanese synchronized swimmer
