= Yvette Baker (synchronised swimmer) =

British synchronised swimmer (born 1991)

Personal information
- Nationality: United Kingdom
- Born: 25 November 1991 (age 34) Sutton Coldfield, England
- Height: 1.70 m (5 ft 7 in)
- Weight: 55 kg (121 lb)

Sport
- Sport: Swimming
- Strokes: Synchronised swimming
- Club: City of Birmingham SC

Yvette Baker (born 25 November 1991) is a competitor in synchronised swimming who represented Great Britain in the team event at the 2012 Olympics. She also competed at two World Championships (2011 and 2013).
