= Valerie Welsh =

Canadian synchronized swimmer

Personal information
- Nationality: Canada
- Born: April 14, 1988 (age 38) Saint-Nicolas, Canada
- Height: 175 cm (5 ft 9 in)
- Weight: 58 kg (128 lb)

Sport
- Sport: Swimming
- Strokes: Synchronized swimming
- Club: Synchro Canada
Medal record
Representing Canada
Synchronized swimming
FINA World Aquatics Championships
Bronze medal – third place	2011 Shanghai	Free routine combination
Pan American Games
Gold medal – first place	2011 Guadalajara	Team

Valerie Welsh (born April 14, 1988) was a Canadian synchronized swimmer.

== Career ==
Welsh won a gold at the 2011 Pan American Games in the team event. She competed in the women's team event at the 2012 Summer Olympics, finishing fourth. Welsh retired from synchronized swimming after the 2012 Olympics.
