= Wang Haibing =

Chinese swimmer

Personal information
- Born: Shanghai, China

Sport
- Sport: Swimming
- Strokes: Freestyle

Wang Haibing is a Chinese swimmer. At the 2012 Summer Olympics, she competed for the national team in the Women's 4 x 100 metre freestyle relay, finishing in 4th place in the final.

== See also ==
- China at the 2012 Summer Olympics - Swimming
