= Geneviève Bélanger =

Canadian synchronized swimmer

Personal information
- National team: Canada
- Born: 27 December 1987 (age 38) Laval, Quebec, Canada
- Height: 1.70 m (5 ft 7 in)
- Weight: 50 kg (110 lb)

Sport
- Sport: Swimming
- Strokes: Synchronized swimming
Medal record
Women's synchronized swimming
Representing Canada
World Championships
| Bronze medal – third place | 2011 Shanghai | Free Routine Combination |

Geneviève Bélanger (born 24 December 1987) is a Canadian retired competitor in synchronized swimming.

She won a bronze medal at the 2011 World Aquatics Championships.
