= Synchronized swimming at the 2012 Summer Olympics – Women's team =

Women's team at the Games of the XXX Olympiad
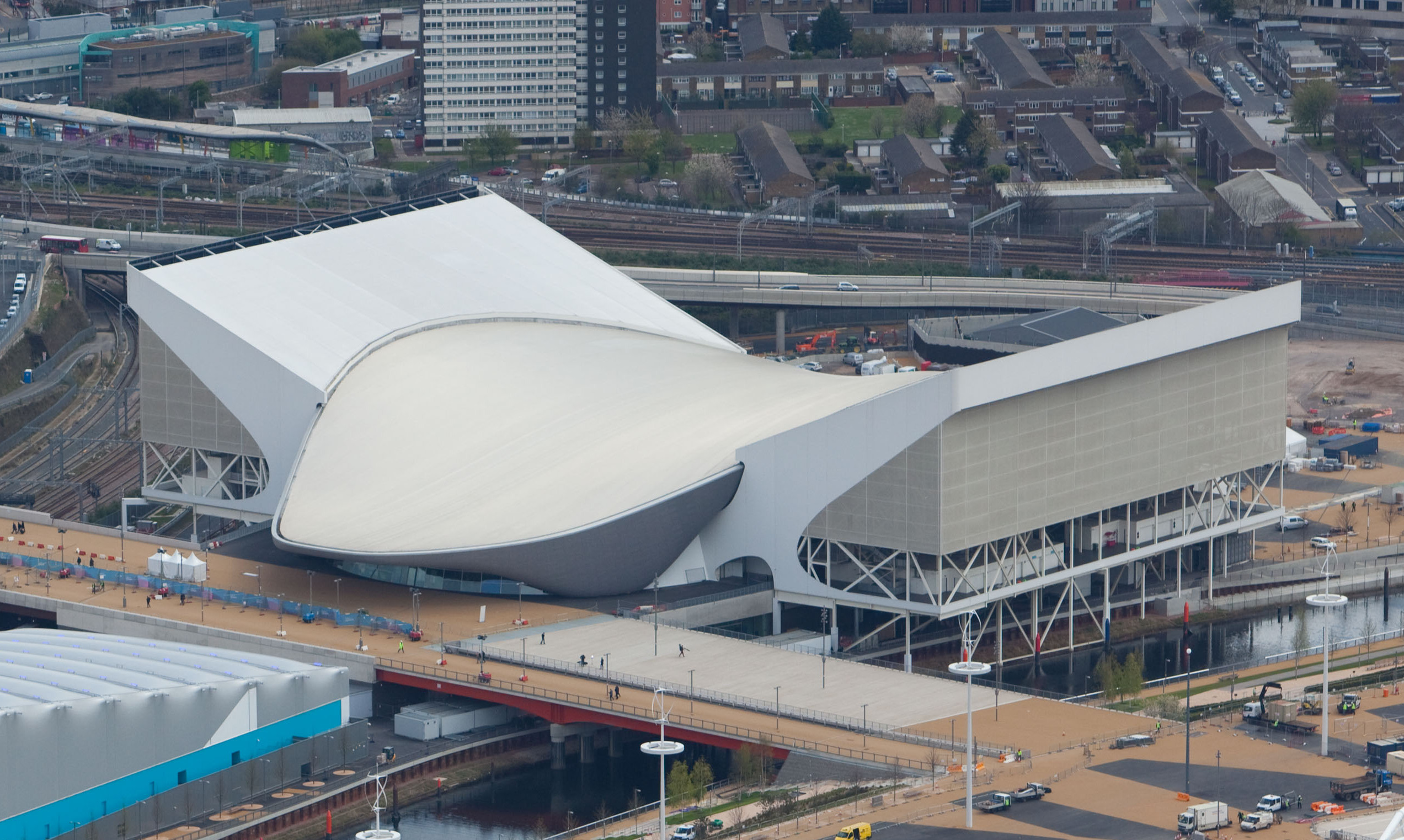
- Aquatics Centre in London
- Venue: Aquatics Centre
- Date: 9–10 August
- Competitors: 64 from 8 nations
- Winning points: 197.030

Medalists
1st place, gold medalist(s)		Russia; Anastasia Davydova, Mariya Gromova, Natalia Ishchenko, Elvira Khasyanova, Daria Korobova, Alexandra Patskevich, Svetlana Romashina, Angelika Timanina, Alla Shishkina
2nd place, silver medalist(s)		China; Chang Si, Chen Xiaojun, Huang Xuechen, Jiang Tingting, Jiang Wenwen, Liu Ou, Luo Xi, Wu Yiwen, Sun Wenyan
3rd place, bronze medalist(s)		Spain; Clara Basiana, Alba Cabello, Ona Carbonell, Margalida Crespí, Andrea Fuentes, Thaïs Henríquez, Paula Klamburg, Irene Montrucchio, Laia Pons

The women's team event at the 2012 Summer Olympics in London, United Kingdom, took place at the Aquatics Centre from 9 to 10 August. Russia maintained its dominance in the sport, as the team delivered a nearly perfect, complex choreography for another gold medal at its fourth consecutive Olympics, having received a powerful, composite score of 197.030 by the judges. Meanwhile, the Chinese squad resisted the challenge from Spain on a historical breakthrough to add a silver in the event with 194.010, edging the Spaniards out of the pool to accept the bronze for a total score of 193.120.

Eight teams competed, each consisting of eight swimmers (from a total team of nine swimmers). There was a single round of competition. Each team presents two routines: a technical routine and a free routine. The technical routine consists of twelve required elements, which must be completed in order and within a time of between 2 minutes 35 seconds and 3 minutes 5 seconds. The free routine has no restrictions other than time; this routine must last between 3 minutes 45 seconds and 4 minutes 15 seconds.

For each routine, the team is judged by two panels of five judges each. One panel is the technical jury, the other is the artistic jury. Each judge gives marks of between 0 and 10. The highest and lowest score from each panel are dropped, leaving a total of six scores which are then summed to give the routine's score. The scores of the two routines are then added to give a final score for the team

== Schedule ==
All times are UTC+1

Date	Time	Round
Thursday, 9 August 2012	15:00	Final Technical Routine
Friday, 10 August 2012	15:00	Final Free Routine

== Results ==
Rank	Country	Athletes	Technical	Free	Total
1st place, gold medalist(s)	Russia	Anastasia Davydova, Mariya Gromova, Natalia Ishchenko, Elvira Khasyanova, Daria Korobova, Alexandra Patskevich, Svetlana Romashina, Angelika Timanina, Alla Shishkina	98.100	98.930	197.030
2nd place, silver medalist(s)	China	Chang Si, Chen Xiaojun, Huang Xuechen, Jiang Tingting, Jiang Wenwen, Liu Ou, Luo Xi, Wu Yiwen, Sun Wenyan	97.000	97.010	194.010
3rd place, bronze medalist(s)	Spain	Clara Basiana, Alba Cabello, Ona Carbonell, Margalida Crespí, Andrea Fuentes, Thaïs Henríquez, Paula Klamburg, Irene Montrucchio, Laia Pons	96.200	96.920	193.120
4	Canada	Marie-Pier Boudreau Gagnon, Stéphanie Durocher, Jo-Annie Fortin, Chloé Isaac, Stéphanie Leclair, Tracy Little, Élise Marcotte, Valerie Welsh, Karine Thomas	94.400	95.230	189.630
5	Japan	Yumi Adachi, Aika Hakoyama, Yukiko Inui, Mayo Itoyama, Chisa Kobayashi, Risako Mitsui, Mariko Sakai, Kurumi Yoshida, Mai Nakamura	93.800	93.830	187.630
6	Great Britain	Katie Clark, Katie Dawkins, Olivia Allison, Jennifer Knobbs, Victoria Lucass, Asha Randall, Jenna Randall, Katie Skelton, Yvette Baker	87.300	88.140	175.440
7	Egypt	Reem Abdalazem, Shaza Abdelrahman, Nour El-Afandi, Dalia El-Gebaly, Samar Hassounah, Youmna Khallaf, Mai Mohamed, Mariam Omar, Aya Darwish	77.600	78.360	155.960
8	Australia	Eloise Amberger, Jenny-Lyn Anderson, Sarah Bombell, Olia Burtaev, Tamika Domrow, Bianca Hammett, Tarren Otte, Samantha Reid, Frankie Owen	77.500	77.430	154.930
