= Zhang Xiaohuan =

Chinese synchronized swimmer

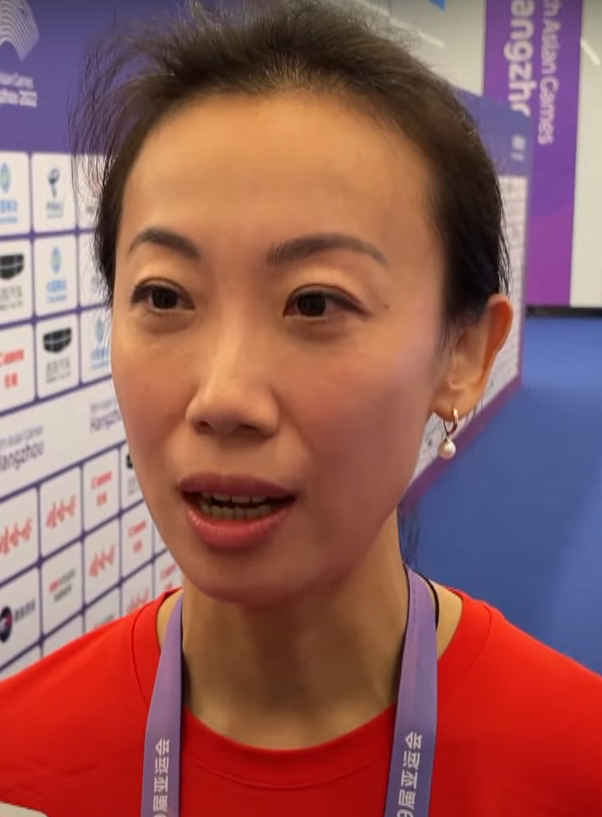

Personal information
- Born: 19 August 1980 (age 45) Beijing, China
- Height: 1.70 m (5 ft 7 in)
- Weight: 55 kg (121 lb)

Sport
- Sport: Swimming
- Strokes: Synchronized swimming
Medal record
Representing China
Women's Synchronized swimming
Olympic Games
Bronze medal – third place	2008 Beijing	Team
World Championships
Silver medal – second place	2009 Rome	Free combination
Bronze medal – third place	2009 Rome	Team technical
Bronze medal – third place	2009 Rome	Team free
Asian Games
Gold medal – first place	2006 Doha	Team
Silver medal – second place	2002 Busan	Duet

Zhang Xiaohuan (simplified Chinese: 张晓欢; traditional Chinese: 張曉歡; pinyin: Zhāng Xiǎohuān; born August 19, 1980) is a Chinese former synchronized swimmer. Her career on the Chinese national team lasted from 1997 to 2009, during which she participated in six FINA World Aquatics Championships. She also competed in the 2000 Summer Olympics, the 2004 Summer Olympics, and the 2008 Summer Olympics, winning a bronze medal in 2008.

Zhang Xiaohuan retired right after the 2009 World Aquatics Championships, and immediately became one of the two head coaches of the Chinese national team. She and fellow rookie coach Wang Na guided Team China to three golds at the 2010 Asian Games. In 2011, she and Masayo Imura (who replaced Wang Na) took Team China to new heights at the 2011 World Aquatics Championships. She left her coaching position in 2012 or 2013, probably due to her pregnancy.
