= Stéphanie Durocher =

Canadian synchronized swimmer

Personal information
- Nationality: Canada
- Born: May 24, 1989 (age 37) Repentigny, Quebec, Canada
- Height: 5 ft 6 in (168 cm)
- Weight: 54 kg (119 lb)

Sport
- Sport: Swimming
- Strokes: Synchronized swimming
- Club: Synchro Canada
Medal record
Representing Canada
Synchronized swimming
FINA World Aquatics Championships
Bronze medal – third place	2011 Shanghai	Free routine combination
Pan American Games
Gold medal – first place	2011 Guadalajara	Team

Stéphanie Durocher (born May 24, 1989) was a Canadian synchronized swimmer and Olympian.

== Career ==
Durocher became a member of Canada's national team in 2008. She competed in the women's team event at the 2012 Olympic Games, finishing fourth. She won gold medal at the 2011 Pan American Games, and a bronze at the 2011 World Aquatics Championships as part of team Canada.

== Honours ==
In 2012 Durocher was awarded a Queen Elizabeth II Diamond Jubilee Medal.
