= Synchronized swimming at the 2006 Asian Games – Women's duet =

Women's duet at the 2006 Asian Games
- Venue: Hamad Aquatic Centre
- Date: 8 December 2006
- Competitors: 22 from 8 nations

Medalists
gold medal	China; Jiang Tingting, Jiang Wenwen, Wang Na
silver medal	Japan; Saho Harada, Ayako Matsumura, Emiko Suzuki
bronze medal	Kazakhstan; Ainur Kerey, Anna Kulkina, Arna Toktagan

The women's duet synchronized swimming competition at the 2006 Asian Games in Doha was held on 8 December at the Hamad Aquatic Centre.

== Schedule ==
All times are Arabia Standard Time (UTC+03:00)

Date	Time	Event
Friday, 8 December 2006	10:00	Technical routine
Friday, 8 December 2006	18:00	Free routine

== Results ==
Legend

- FR — Reserve in free
- RR — Reserve in technical and free
- TR — Reserve in technical

Rank	Team	Technical (50%)	Free (50%)	Total
1st place, gold medalist(s)	China (CHN); Jiang Tingting; Jiang Wenwen; Wang Na (RR)	48.084	48.500	96.584
2nd place, silver medalist(s)	Japan (JPN); Saho Harada; Ayako Matsumura (RR); Emiko Suzuki	48.167	48.334	96.501
3rd place, bronze medalist(s)	Kazakhstan (KAZ); Ainur Kerey (RR); Anna Kulkina; Arna Toktagan	44.584	45.084	89.668
4	South Korea (KOR); Cho Moung-kyoung; Kim Min-jeong	44.584	44.750	89.334
5	North Korea (PRK); Tokgo Pom; Wang Ok-gyong	43.167	43.584	86.751
6	Uzbekistan (UZB); Natalya Korneeva; Darya Mojaeva (RR); Valentina Popova	39.417	39.417	78.834
7	Malaysia (MAS); Katrina Abdul Hadi; Jillian Ng (FR); Yshai Poo Voon (TR)	38.500	39.334	77.834
8	Macau (MAC); Au Ieong Sin Ieng; Lok Ka Man; Sin Wan I (RR)	37.417	38.167	75.584
