= Jong Yon-hui =

North Korean synchronized swimmer (born 1989)

Personal information
- Nationality: North Korea
- Born: 2 November 1989 (age 36) Pyongyang, North Korea
- Height: 163 cm (5 ft 4 in)

Sport
- Sport: Swimming
- Strokes: Synchronized swimming
Medal record
Representing North Korea
Asian Games
Bronze medal – third place	2014 Incheon	Team

- Jong Yon-hui
- Hangul: 정연희
- RR: Jeong Yeonhui
- MR: Chŏng Yŏnhŭi

Jong Yon-hui (Korean: 정연희; born 2 November 1989) is a North Korean synchronized swimmer. She competed in the women's duet at the 2012 Summer Olympics with Jang Hyang-Mi.
