= Thaïs Henríquez =

Spanish synchronized swimmer

Personal information
- Full name: Thaïs Henríquez Torres
- National team: Spain
- Born: October 29, 1982 (age 43) Las Palmas, Gran Canaria
- Height: 6 ft 1 in (185 cm)
- Weight: 150 lb (68 kg)

Sport
- Sport: Synchronised swimming
Medal record
Representing Spain
Olympic Games
Silver medal – second place	2008 Beijing	Team
Bronze medal – third place	2012 London	Team
World Championships
Gold medal – first place	2009 Rome	Free combination
Silver medal – second place	2007 Melbourne	Team free
Silver medal – second place	2009 Rome	Team technical
Silver medal – second place	2009 Rome	Team free
Silver medal – second place	2013 Barcelona	Team technical
Silver medal – second place	2013 Barcelona	Team free
Silver medal – second place	2013 Barcelona	Routine combination
Bronze medal – third place	2005 Montreal	Team
Bronze medal – third place	2005 Montreal	Free combination
Bronze medal – third place	2011 Shanghai	Team technical
Bronze medal – third place	2011 Shanghai	Team free
European Championships
Gold medal – first place	2012 Debrecen	Team
Gold medal – first place	2012 Debrecen	Combination
Silver medal – second place	2010 Budapest	Team
Silver medal – second place	2010 Budapest	Combination
Silver medal – second place	2014 Berlin	Combination routine

Thaïs Henríquez Torres (born 29 October 1982) is a Spanish synchronized swimmer. She competed for Spain in the team event at the 2008 Summer Olympics, winning silver, and the 2012 Summer Olympics, winning bronze. She won eleven medals at the World Swimming Championships between 2005 and 2013, and eight medals at the European Swimming Championships between 2006 and 2014.
