= Chisa Kobayashi =

Japanese synchronized swimmer

Personal information
- Nationality: Japan
- Born: 12 December 1987 (age 38) Kyoto, Japan
- Height: 1.66 m (5 ft 5 in)

Sport
- Sport: Swimming
- Strokes: Synchronized swimming
- Club: Imura Synchro Club
Medal record
Representing Japan
Synchronized swimming
Asian Games
Silver medal – second place	2010 Guangzhou	Women's duet
Silver medal – second place	2010 Guangzhou	Women's team
Silver medal – second place	2010 Guangzhou	Women's combination
FINA Synchronized Swimming World Cup
Bronze medal – third place	2010 Changshu	Women's duet
- Updated on 24 May 2015

Chisa Kobayashi (小林 千紗, Kobayashi Chisa; born 12 December 1987) is a Japanese synchronized swimmer. She competed in both the women's duet (with Yukiko Inui) and the women's team events at the 2012 Summer Olympics.
