= Jiang Wenwen (synchronized swimmer) =

Chinese synchronized swimmer

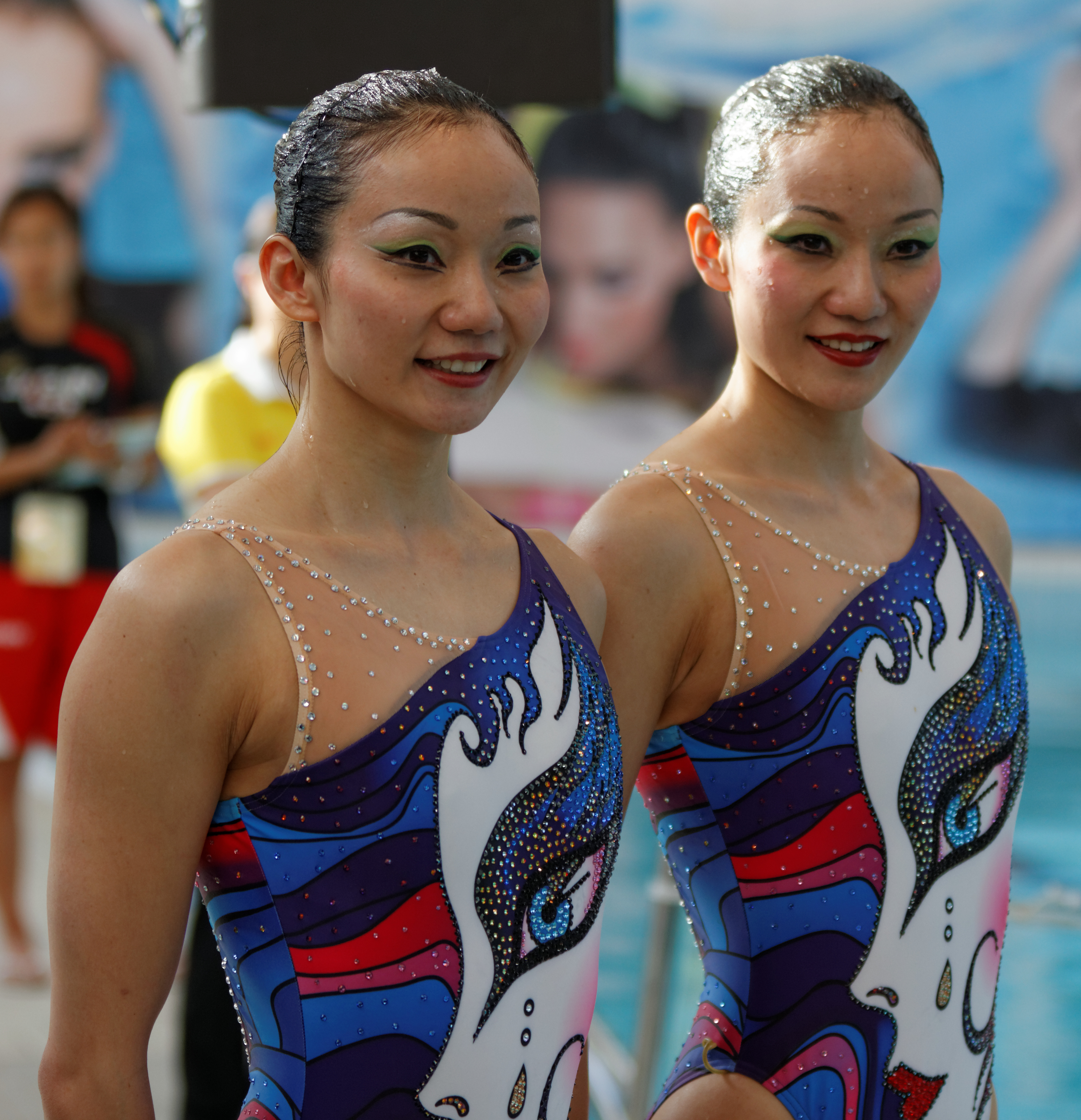
- Jiang Tingting and Jiang Wenwen in 2013

Personal information
- Born: 25 September 1986 (age 39) Chengdu, Sichuan, China

Sport
- Country: China
- Sport: Synchronized swimming
Medal record
Olympic Games
Silver medal – second place	2012 London	Team
Bronze medal – third place	2008 Beijing	Team
World Championships
Silver medal – second place	2009 Rome	Free routine combination
Silver medal – second place	2011 Shanghai	Team technical routine
Silver medal – second place	2011 Shanghai	Duet free routine
Silver medal – second place	2011 Shanghai	Team free routine
Silver medal – second place	2013 Barcelona	Duet technical routine
Silver medal – second place	2013 Barcelona	Duet free routine
Silver medal – second place	2017 Budapest	Duet technical routine
Silver medal – second place	2017 Budapest	Duet free routine
Bronze medal – third place	2009 Rome	Duet technical routine
Bronze medal – third place	2009 Rome	Duet free routine
Bronze medal – third place	2009 Rome	Team technical routine
Bronze medal – third place	2009 Rome	Team free routine
Asian Games
Gold medal – first place	2006 Doha	Duet
Gold medal – first place	2006 Doha	Team
Gold medal – first place	2010 Guangzhou	Duet
Gold medal – first place	2010 Guangzhou	Team
Gold medal – first place	2010 Guangzhou	Combination
Gold medal – first place	2018 Jakarta	Duet

Jiang Wenwen (simplified Chinese: 蒋文文; traditional Chinese: 蔣文文; pinyin: Jiǎng Wénwén; born 25 September 1986 in Chengdu, Sichuan) is a Chinese synchronized swimmer.

She competed at the 2008 Olympics in the duet event with her twin sister Jiang Tingting and the teams event. She also competed in the teams event at the 2012 Olympics.
