= Ai Aoki (synchronized swimmer) =

Japanese synchronised swimmer (born 1985)

Personal information
- Born: May 11, 1985 (age 41) Kyoto, Japan

Sport
- Sport: Synchronised swimming
Medal record
Representing Japan
World Championships
Silver medal – second place	2007 Melbourne	Team, free routine
Asian Games
Silver medal – second place	2006 Doha	Team

Ai Aoki (青木愛, Aoki Ai; born 11 May 1985) is a Japanese synchronised swimmer who competed in the 2008 Summer Olympics.

Following her retirement from competition, Aoki became a "tarento", making regular appearances on Japanese television, including during the 2016 Summer Olympics.
