= Sun Qiuting =

Chinese synchronized swimmer

Personal information
- Born: September 22, 1985 (age 40) Shanghai, China

Sport
- Sport: Synchronised swimming
Medal record
Representing China
Olympic Games
Bronze medal – third place	2008 Beijing	Team
Asian Games
Gold medal – first place	2006 Doha	Team

Sun Qiuting (Chinese: 孙萩亭, born 22 September 1985) is a Chinese synchronized swimmer. She represented China at the 2008 Summer Olympics, where she won a bronze medal.
