= Miho Arai =

Japanese synchronized swimmer (born 1988)

Personal information
- National team: Japan
- Born: 3 September 1988 (age 37) Tokyo, Japan
- Height: 1.67 m (5 ft 6 in)

Sport
- Sport: Swimming
- Strokes: Synchronized swimming
Medal record
Women's synchronized swimming
Representing Japan
Asian Games
Silver medal – second place	2010 Guangzhou	Team
Silver medal – second place	2010 Guangzhou	Combination
Silver medal – second place	2014 Incheon	Team
Silver medal – second place	2014 Incheon	Combination

Miho Arai (荒井 美帆, Arai Miho; born 3 September 1988) is a retired Japanese competitor in synchronized swimming.

She won two silver medals at the 2010 Asian Games and two silver medals at the 2014 Asian Games. She also won two silver medals at the 2014 FINA Synchronized Swimming World Cup.
