= Arna Toktagan =

Kazakhstani synchronized swimmer

Personal information
- Full name: Arna Aytzhanovna Toktagan
- Nationality: Kazakhstan
- Born: 5 February 1986 (age 40) Alma-Ata, Kazakh SSR, Soviet Union
- Height: 173 cm (5 ft 8 in)
- Weight: 54 kg (119 lb)

Sport
- Sport: Swimming
- Strokes: Synchronized swimming
Medal record
Representing Kazakhstan
Synchronized swimming
Asian Games
Bronze medal – third place	2006 Doha	Women's duet
- Updated on 2 August 2015

Arna Toktagan (Арна Айтжанқызы Тоқтаған, born 5 February 1986) is a Kazakhstani synchronized swimmer. She competed in the women's duet at the 2004 and 2008 Summer Olympics.
