= Alla Shishkina =

Russian synchronized swimmer

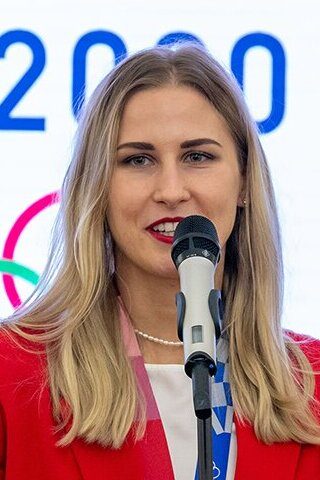
- Shishkina in 2021

Personal information
- Full name: Alla Anatolyevna Shishkina
- Nationality: Russian
- Born: 2 August 1989 (age 37) Moscow, Russian SFSR, Soviet Union
- Height: 1.70 m (5 ft 7 in)
- Weight: 54 kg (119 lb)

Sport
- Sport: Swimming
- Strokes: Synchronised swimming
- Club: MGFSO Dynamo
Medal record
Event	1st	2nd	3rd
Olympic Games	3	0	0
World Championships	14	0	0
European Championships	6	0	0
Summer Universiade	2	0	0
Total	25	0	0
Representing (Russia) ROC
Olympic Games
Gold medal – first place	2020 Tokyo	Team
Representing Russia
Olympic Games
Gold medal – first place	2012 London	Team
Gold medal – first place	2016 Rio de Janeiro	Team
World Championships
Gold medal – first place	2009 Rome	Team technical routine
Gold medal – first place	2009 Rome	Team free routine
Gold medal – first place	2011 Shanghai	Team technical routine
Gold medal – first place	2011 Shanghai	Team free routine
Gold medal – first place	2011 Shanghai	Free routine combination
Gold medal – first place	2013 Barcelona	Team technical routine
Gold medal – first place	2013 Barcelona	Team free routine
Gold medal – first place	2013 Barcelona	Free routine combination
Gold medal – first place	2015 Kazan	Team technical routine
Gold medal – first place	2015 Kazan	Team free routine
Gold medal – first place	2015 Kazan	Free routine combination
Gold medal – first place	2019 Gwangju	Team technical routine
Gold medal – first place	2019 Gwangju	Team free routine
Gold medal – first place	2019 Gwangju	Free routine combination
European Championships
Gold medal – first place	2010 Budapest	Team
Gold medal – first place	2010 Budapest	Free routine combination
Gold medal – first place	2014 Berlin	Team
Gold medal – first place	2016 London	Team technical routine
Gold medal – first place	2016 London	Free routine combination
Gold medal – first place	2020 Budapest	Team technical routine
Summer Universiade
Gold medal – first place	2013 Kazan	Team
Gold medal – first place	2013 Kazan	Free routine combination

Alla Anatolyevna Shishkina (Russian: Алла Анатольевна Шишкина, IPA: [ˈaɫə ˈʂɨʂkʲɪnə]; born 2 August 1989) is a Russian synchronized swimmer. She won a gold medal in the women's team competition at the 2012 Summer Olympics, 2016 Summer Olympics and 2020 Summer Olympics.
