= Synchronised swimming at the 2009 World Aquatics Championships =

The Synchronised swimming competition at the 2009 World Aquatics Championships were held from July 18–25, 2009.

== Medal table ==
Rank	Nation	Gold	Silver	Bronze	Total
1	Russia (RUS)	6	0	0	6
2	Spain (ESP)	1	6	0	7
3	China (CHN)	0	1	4	5
4	Canada (CAN)	0	0	2	2
5	Italy (ITA)	0	0	1	1
Totals (5 entries)		7	7	7	21

== Medal summary ==
Event	Gold	Silver	Bronze
Solo Technical Routine	Natalia Ishchenko (RUS)	Gemma Mengual (ESP)	Marie-Pier Boudreau Gagnon (CAN)
Solo Free Routine	Natalia Ishchenko (RUS)	Gemma Mengual (ESP)	Beatrice Adelizzi (ITA)
Duet Technical Routine	Anastasia Davydova (RUS); Svetlana Romashina (RUS)	Andrea Fuentes (ESP); Gemma Mengual (ESP)	Jiang Tingting (CHN); Jiang Wenwen (CHN)
Duet Free Routine	Natalia Ishchenko (RUS); Svetlana Romashina (RUS)	Andrea Fuentes (ESP); Gemma Mengual (ESP)	Jiang Tingting (CHN); Jiang Wenwen (CHN)
Team Technical Routine	Russia	Spain	China
Team Free Routine	Russia	Spain	China
Free Routine Combination	Spain	China	Canada
