= Kurumi Yoshida =

Japanese synchronized swimmer

Personal information
- Born: 1 December 1991 (age 34) Osaka, Japan
- Height: 1.67 m (5 ft 6 in)

Sport
- Country: Japan
- Sport: Synchronized swimming
- Club: Imura Synchro Club
Medal record
Synchronized swimming
Representing Japan
Olympic Games
| Bronze medal – third place | 2016 Rio de Janeiro | Team |
World Championships
| Bronze medal – third place | 2015 Kazan | Team technical routine |
| Bronze medal – third place | 2015 Kazan | Team free routine |
| Bronze medal – third place | 2015 Kazan | Free routine combination |
Asian Games
| Silver medal – second place | 2010 Guangzhou | Women's team |
| Silver medal – second place | 2010 Guangzhou | Women's combination |
| Silver medal – second place | 2014 Incheon | Women's team |
| Silver medal – second place | 2014 Incheon | Women's combination |
- Updated on 2018

Kurumi Yoshida (吉田 胡桃, Yoshida Kurumi; born 1 December 1991) is a Japanese synchronized swimmer. She competed in the women's team event at the 2012 Olympic Games. She was part of the Japanese team that won bronze at the 2016 Olympics. She was also part of the Japanese team that won bronze medal in the team technical routine, team free routine and free routine combination events at the 2015 World Championships.
