= Wu Yiwen =

Chinese synchronized swimmer

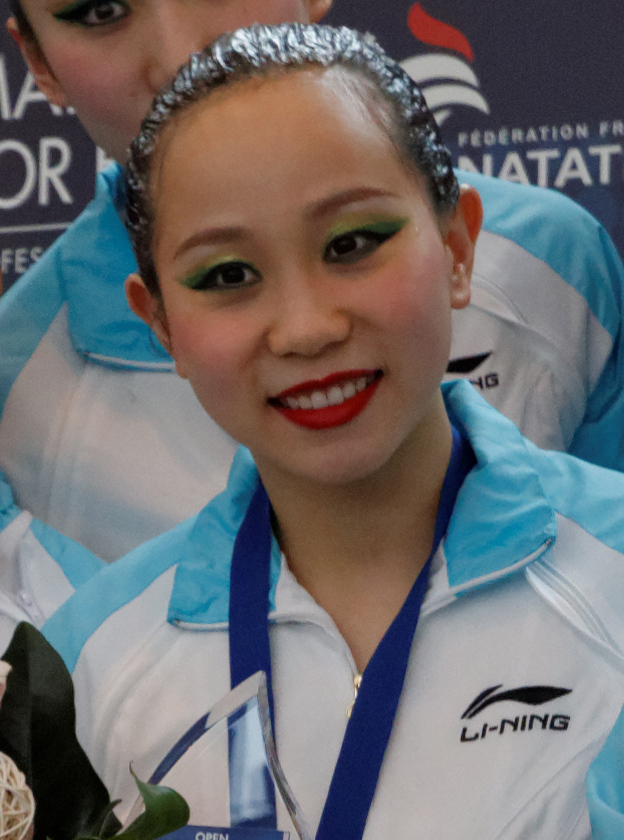
- Wu Yiwen at Open Make Up For Ever 2013

Personal information
- Nationality: Chinese
- Born: 5 August 1986 (age 39) Shanghai, China
- Height: 1.68 m (5 ft 6 in)
- Weight: 55 kg (121 lb)

Sport
- Sport: Swimming
- Strokes: Synchronized swimming
Medal record
Representing China
Women's Synchronized swimming
Olympic Games
Silver medal – second place	2012 London	Team
World Championships
Silver medal – second place	2009 Rome	Free combination
Silver medal – second place	2011 Shanghai	Team technical
Silver medal – second place	2011 Shanghai	Free combination
Silver medal – second place	2011 Shanghai	Team free
Bronze medal – third place	2009 Rome	Team free
Bronze medal – third place	2009 Rome	Team technical
Asian Games
Gold medal – first place	2006 Doha	Team
Gold medal – first place	2010 Guangzhou	Team
Gold medal – first place	2010 Guangzhou	Combination

Wu Yiwen (simplified Chinese: 吴怡文; traditional Chinese: 吳怡文; pinyin: Wú Yíwén; born August 5, 1986, in Shanghai) is a Chinese Olympic synchronized swimmer, reaching 168 centimetres (5 ft 6 in) in height. She won a silver medal in team competition at the 2012 Summer Olympics, and previously swam in the 2006 Asian Games in Doha and 2010 Asian Games in Guangzhou.
