= Jang Hyang-mi =

North Korean synchronized swimmer (born 1989)

Personal information
- Nationality: North Korean
- Born: 3 March 1989 (age 36); Pyongyang, North Korea
- Height: 5 ft 5 in (165 cm)

Sport
- Sport: Swimming
- Event: Synchronized swimming

Korean name
- Hangul: 장향미
- RR: Jang Hyangmi
- MR: Chang Hyangmi
- Updated on 23 October 2014

Jang Hyang-mi (born 3 March 1989) is a North Korean synchronized swimmer. She competed in the women's duet at the 2012 Summer Olympics with Jong Yon-Hui.
