= Kim Yong-mi (synchronized swimmer) =

North Korean synchronized swimmer (born 1989)

Personal information
- Born: 23 August 1989 (age 36) Pyongyang, North Korea

Korean name
- Hangul: 김영미
- RR: Gim Yeongmi
- MR: Kim Yŏngmi

Sport
- Country: North Korea
- Sport: Synchronized swimming
Medal record
Representing North Korea
Asian Games
Bronze medal – third place	2006 Doha	Team
Bronze medal – third place	2010 Guangzhou	Team

Kim Yong-mi (Korean: 김영미; born 23 August 1989) is a North Korean synchronized swimmer who competed in the 2008 Summer Olympics. Kim was born in Pyongyang.
