= Aika Hakoyama =

Japanese synchronized swimmer

Personal information
- Nationality: Japanese
- Born: 27 July 1991 (age 34) Nagano, Japan
- Height: 176 cm (5 ft 9 in)

Sport
- Sport: Swimming
- Strokes: Synchronized swimming
- Club: AQLUB Chofu
Medal record
Synchronized swimming
Representing Japan
Olympic Games
| Bronze medal – third place | 2016 Rio de Janeiro | Team |
World Championships
| Bronze medal – third place | 2015 Kazan | Team technical routine |
| Bronze medal – third place | 2015 Kazan | Team free routine |
| Bronze medal – third place | 2015 Kazan | Free routine combination |
Asian Games
| Silver medal – second place | 2010 Guangzhou | Women's team |
| Silver medal – second place | 2010 Guangzhou | Women's combination |
| Silver medal – second place | 2014 Incheon | Women's team |
| Silver medal – second place | 2014 Incheon | Women's combination |
Summer Universiade
| Silver medal – second place | 2013 Kazan | Women's team |
| Silver medal – second place | 2013 Kazan | Women's combination |

Aika Hakoyama (箱山 愛香, Hakoyama Aika; born 27 July 1991) is a Japanese synchronized swimmer. She was part of the Japanese team that won bronze at the 2016 Summer Olympics, and the Japanese team that won bronze in the team technical routine, team free routine and the free routine combination events at the 2015 World Championship.

She competed in the women's team event at the 2012 Olympic Games.
