= Irene Montrucchio =

Spanish synchronized swimmer

Personal information
- Born: 7 October 1991 (age 34) Barcelona, Spain

Sport
- Sport: Synchronised swimming
Medal record
Representing Spain
Olympic Games
Bronze medal – third place	2012 London	Team
World Championships
Silver medal – second place	2013 Barcelona	Free combination
European Championships
Gold medal – first place	2012 Eindhoven	Team free
Gold medal – first place	2012 Eindhoven	Free combination
Silver medal – second place	2010 Budapest	Free combination

Irene Montrucchio Beaus (Note: In this Spanish name, the first or paternal surname is Montrucchio and the second or maternal family name is Beaus.) (born 7 October 1991) is a Spanish competitor in synchronized swimming. She won a bronze medal in team competition at the 2012 Summer Olympics.
