= Mayo Itoyama =

Japanese synchronized swimmer

Personal information
- Nationality: Japan
- Born: 1 November 1991 (age 34) Tsuchiura, Japan
- Height: 166 cm (5 ft 5 in)

Sport
- Sport: Swimming
- Strokes: Synchronized swimming
- Club: AQLUB Chofu
Medal record
Representing Japan
Synchronized swimming
Asian Games
Silver medal – second place	2010 Guangzhou	Women's team
Silver medal – second place	2010 Guangzhou	Women's combination
Silver medal – second place	2014 Incheon	Women's team
Silver medal – second place	2014 Incheon	Women's combination
Summer Universiade
Silver medal – second place	2013 Kazan	Women's team
Silver medal – second place	2013 Kazan	Women's combination
- Updated on 25 May 2015

Mayo Itoyama (糸山 真与, Itoyama Mayo; born 1 November 1991) is a Japanese synchronized swimmer. She competed in the women's team event at the 2012 Olympic Games. The team finished in 5th place.
