= Chang Si =

Chinese synchronized swimmer

Personal information
- Born: 15 November 1986 (age 39) Beijing, China
- Height: 1.70 m (5 ft 7 in)
- Weight: 56 kg (123 lb)

Sport
- Sport: Swimming
- Strokes: Synchronized swimming
Medal record
Representing China
Women's Synchronized swimming
Olympic Games
Silver medal – second place	2012 London	Team
World Championships
Silver medal – second place	2011 Shanghai	Team technical
Silver medal – second place	2011 Shanghai	Free combination
Silver medal – second place	2011 Shanghai	Team free
Asian Games
Gold medal – first place	2010 Guangzhou	Team
Gold medal – first place	2010 Guangzhou	Combination

Chang Si (Chinese: 常思; pinyin: Cháng Sī; November 15, 1986) is a Chinese retired competitor in synchronized swimming. She won a silver medal in team competition at the 2012 Summer Olympics.

Chang Si's paternal grandfather Chang Baohua was a famous comedian.
