= Foshan Aquatics Center =

Sports venue in Foshan, China

The Foshan Aquatics Center is a sports venue in Central Park, Xincheng District, Foshan City.

It hosted synchronized swimming events during the 2010 Asian Games.
