= Ainur Kerey =

Kazakhstani synchronized swimmer

Personal information
- Native name: Айнур Керей
- Nationality: Kazakhstani
- Born: 19 March 1986 (age 40) Alma-Ata, Kazakh SSR, Soviet Union
- Height: 5 ft 8 in (173 cm)
- Weight: 56 kg (123 lb)

Sport
- Sport: Swimming
- Event: Synchronized swimming
Medal record
Representing Kazakhstan
Synchronized swimming
Asian Games
Bronze medal – third place	2006 Doha	Women's duet
Bronze medal – third place	2010 Guangzhou	Women's combination
- Updated on 26 October 2014

Ainur Kerey (Айнур Керейкызы Керей, born 10 July 1984) is a Kazakhstani synchronized swimmer. She competed in the women's duet at the 2008 Summer Olympics.
