= Luo Xi (synchronized swimmer, born 1987) =

Chinese synchronised swimmer

Personal information
- Born: 15 December 1987 (age 38) Wuhan, Hubei, China
- Height: 1.66 m (5 ft 5 in)
- Weight: 54 kg (119 lb)

Sport
- Sport: Swimming
- Strokes: Synchronized swimming
Medal record
Representing China
Women's synchronised swimming
Olympic Games
Silver medal – second place	2012 London	Team
Bronze medal – third place	2008 Beijing	Team
World Championships
Silver medal – second place	2009 Rome	Free combination
Silver medal – second place	2011 Shanghai	Team technical
Silver medal – second place	2011 Shanghai	Free combination
Silver medal – second place	2011 Shanghai	Team free
Bronze medal – third place	2009 Rome	Team technical
Bronze medal – third place	2009 Rome	Team free
World Cup
Silver medal – second place	2010 Changshu	Team
Silver medal – second place	2010 Changshu	Free combination
Asian Games
Gold medal – first place	2010 Guangzhou	Team
Gold medal – first place	2010 Guangzhou	Combination

Luo Xi (simplified Chinese: 罗茜; traditional Chinese: 羅茜; pinyin: Luó Xī; born December 15, 1987) is a Chinese female synchronised swimmer, reaching 166 centimetres (5 ft 5 in) in height.

She competed in the 2008 Summer Olympics in Beijing, the 2010 Asian Games in Guangzhou and the 2012 Summer Olympics in London.

== Personal life ==
Luo Xi married former diver Hu Jia in 2013. She gave birth to a son in 2015.
