= Fan Jiachen =

Chinese synchronized swimmer

Personal information
- Born: February 21, 1988 (age 38) Beijing, China
- Height: 1.70 m (5 ft 7 in)
- Weight: 54 kg (119 lb)

Sport
- Sport: Swimming
- Strokes: Synchronized swimming
Medal record
Women's synchronized swimming
Representing China
World Championships
Silver medal – second place	2011 Shanghai	Team free
Silver medal – second place	2011 Shanghai	Free combination

Fan Jiachen (Chinese: 范佳晨, born 21 February 1988) is a Chinese competitor in synchronized swimming.

She won 2 silver medals at the 2011 World Aquatics Championships. She was also a reserve for the gold-winning Chinese team at the 2010 Asian Games.

== Personal life ==
Fan Jiachen married footballer Zhu Yifan in 2014.
