= Wang Ok-gyong =

North Korean synchronized swimmer

- Hangul: 왕옥경
- RR: Wang Okgyeong
- MR: Wang Okkyŏng

Wang Ok-gyong
Personal information
- Born: August 27, 1989 (age 36) Pyeongyang, North Korea

Sport
- Sport: Synchronised swimming
Medal record
Representing North Korea
Asian Games
Bronze medal – third place	2006 Doha	Team
Bronze medal – third place	2010 Guangzhou	Team

Wang Ok-gyong (born 27 August 1989) is a North Korean synchronized swimmer who competed in the 2008 Summer Olympics.
