= Yumi Adachi (synchronized swimmer) =

Japanese synchronised swimmer

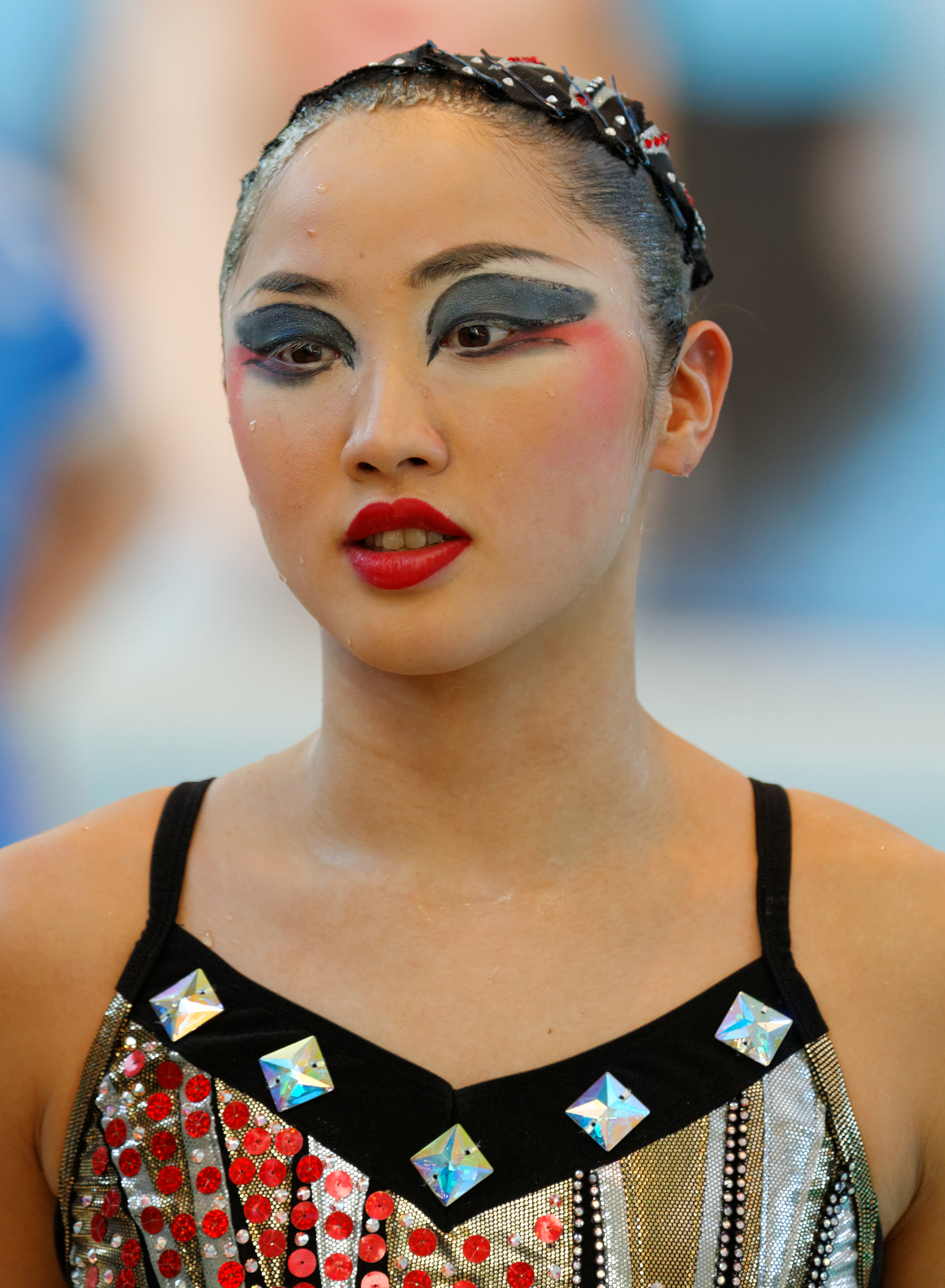
- Adachi in March 2013

Personal information
- Nationality: Japanese
- Born: 7 February 1989 (age 37) Saitama, Japan
- Height: 1.60 m (5 ft 3 in)
- Weight: 46 kg (101 lb)

Sport
- Sport: Swimming
- Strokes: Synchronised swimming
- Club: Tokyo Synchro Club
Medal record
World Championships
Bronze medal – third place	2019 Gwangju	Mixed duet technical
Bronze medal – third place	2019 Gwangju	Mixed duet free

Yumi Adachi (足立 夢実, Adachi Yumi; born 7 February 1989) is a Japanese synchronised swimmer.

Yumi competed in the women's team event the 2012 Summer Olympics, and the 2009, 2011 and 2013 World Aquatics Championships. She retired after the 2013 World Aquatics Championships.
