= Anna Kulkina =

Kazakhstani synchronized swimmer

Personal information
- Nationality: Kazakhstan
- Born: 19 March 1986 (age 40) Alma-Ata, Kazakh SSR, Soviet Union
- Height: 1.67 m (5 ft 6 in)

Sport
- Sport: Synchronized swimming
Medal record
Representing Kazakhstan
Synchronized swimming
Asian Games
Bronze medal – third place	2006 Doha	Women's duet
Bronze medal – third place	2010 Guangzhou	Women's combination
- Updated on 22 May 2015

Anna Kulkina (born 19 March 1986) is a Kazakhstani synchronized swimmer. She competed in the women's duet at the 2012 Summer Olympics with Aigerim Zhexembinova.
