= Liu Ou =

Chinese synchronized swimmer

Personal information
- Born: 13 November 1986 (age 39) Zhanjiang, Guangdong, China
- Height: 1.68 m (5 ft 6 in)
- Weight: 50 kg (110 lb)

Sport
- Sport: Swimming
- Strokes: Synchronized swimming
Medal record
Women's Synchronized swimming
Representing China
Event	1st	2nd	3rd
Olympic Games	0	1	2
World Championships	0	5	2
Total	0	6	4
Olympic Games
Silver medal – second place	2012 London	Team
Bronze medal – third place	2008 Beijing	Team
Bronze medal – third place	2012 London	Duet
World Championships
Silver medal – second place	2009 Rome	Free combination
Silver medal – second place	2011 Shanghai	Duet technical
Silver medal – second place	2011 Shanghai	Team technical
Silver medal – second place	2011 Shanghai	Free combination
Silver medal – second place	2011 Shanghai	Team free
Bronze medal – third place	2009 Rome	Team technical
Bronze medal – third place	2009 Rome	Team free
World Cup
Silver medal – second place	2010 Changshu	Team
Silver medal – second place	2010 Changshu	Free combination
Asian Games
Gold medal – first place	2006 Doha	Team
Gold medal – first place	2010 Guangzhou	Team
Gold medal – first place	2010 Guangzhou	Combination

Liu Ou (Chinese: 刘鸥, born 13 November 1986) is a Chinese synchronized swimmer.

Liu competed in the women's team event at the 2008 Summer Olympics where she won a bronze medal. She followed up this success in the women's duet and women's team events at the 2012 Summer Olympics where she won a bronze (with Huang Xuechen) and silver medal respectively.

After her retirement in 2013, Liu Ou went to the United States to coach the Santa Clara Aquamaids.
