= Yu Lele =

Chinese synchronized swimmer

Personal information
- National team: China
- Born: 22 March 1989 (age 37) Beijing, China
- Height: 1.75 m (5 ft 9 in)
- Weight: 62 kg (137 lb)

Sport
- Sport: Swimming
- Strokes: Synchronized swimming
Medal record
Women's synchronized swimming
Representing China
World Championships
Gold medal – first place	2017 Budapest	Free routine combination
Silver medal – second place	2011 Shanghai	Free Routine Combination
Silver medal – second place	2017 Budapest	Team free routine
Asian Games
Gold medal – first place	2010 Guangzhou	Combined Routine
Gold medal – first place	2014 Incheon	Team Routine
Gold medal – first place	2014 Incheon	Combined Routine

Yu Lele (Chinese: 于乐乐, born 22 March 1989) is a Chinese competitor in synchronized swimming.

She has won a silver medal at the 2011 World Aquatics Championships. She also won 1 gold medal at the 2010 Asian Games and 2 golds at the 2014 Asian Games.
