= Daria Korobova =

Russian synchronized swimmer

Personal information
- Full name: Darya Sergeyevna Korobova
- Nationality: Russia
- Born: 7 February 1989 (age 37) Elektrostal, Russian SFSR, Soviet Union
- Height: 1.78 m (5 ft 10 in)

Sport
- Sport: Swimming
- Strokes: Synchronized swimming
- Club: SC Yunost Moskvy
Medal record
Representing Russia
Women's Synchronized swimming
Olympic Games
Gold medal – first place	2012 London	Team
World Championships
Gold medal – first place	2009 Rome	Team technical routine
Gold medal – first place	2009 Rome	Team free
Gold medal – first place	2011 Shanghai	Team event, technical routine
Gold medal – first place	2011 Shanghai	Team event, Free routine
Gold medal – first place	2011 Shanghai	Women's combo
Gold medal – first place	2013 Barcelona	Team technical
Gold medal – first place	2013 Barcelona	Team free
Gold medal – first place	2013 Barcelona	Routine combination
European Championships
Gold medal – first place	2010 Budapest	Team event
Gold medal – first place	2010 Budapest	Women's combo
Gold medal – first place	2014 Berlin	Duet
Summer Universiade
Gold medal – first place	2013 Kazan	Team
Gold medal – first place	2013 Kazan	Routine combination
- Updated on 25 May 2015

Daria Sergeyevna Korobova (born 7 February 1989) is a Russian competitor in synchronized swimming. She won a gold medal in the women's team competition at the 2012 Summer Olympics.

She was an eight times winner of the World Championships, seven times winner of the European Championships. Since 2020 Advisor to the President of the Federation of Synchronized Swimming, Diving and Russian Water Polo Federation . She announced her retirement in 2015 and begin working as the public manager of FC Dynamo Moscow.

She began training at the age of 7 in her home town of Elektrostal. She was originally taken to her lessons by her grandmother. She made her international debut for Russia in 2008.
