= Angelika Timanina =

Russian synchronized swimmer

Personal information
- Full name: Angelika Igorevna Timanina
- Nationality: Russia
- Born: 26 April 1989 (age 37) Yekaterinburg, Russian SFSR, Soviet Union
- Height: 1.76 m (5 ft 9 in)

Sport
- Sport: Swimming
- Strokes: Synchronized swimming
- Club: Childs Youth School of Olympic Reserve “Trud” of synchronized swimming “Junost’ Moskvy”
Medal record
Women's Synchronized swimming
Representing Russia
Olympic Games
Gold medal – first place	2012 London	Team
World Championships
Gold medal – first place	2009 Rome	Team event, technical routine
Gold medal – first place	2009 Rome	Team event, Free routine
Gold medal – first place	2011 Shanghai	Team event, technical routine
Gold medal – first place	2011 Shanghai	Team event, Free routine
Gold medal – first place	2011 Shanghai	Women’s combo
Gold medal – first place	2013 Barcelona	Team technical
Gold medal – first place	2013 Barcelona	Team free
Gold medal – first place	2013 Barcelona	Routine combination
Gold medal – first place	2015 Kazan	Team technical routine
Gold medal – first place	2015 Kazan	Team free routine
Gold medal – first place	2015 Kazan	Free routine combination
European Championships
Gold medal – first place	2010 Budapest	Team event
Gold medal – first place	2010 Budapest	Women’s combo

Angelika Igorevna Timanina (Russian: Анжелика Игоревна Тиманина; born April 26, 1989, in Yekaterinburg) is a retired Russian competitor in synchronized swimming. Captain of the National Olympic team and a member of the city club of Moscow, she was an eight times winner of the World Championships, seven times winner of the European Championships. She won a gold medal in the women's team competition at the 2012 Summer Olympics, and announced her retirement on 1 July 2017 and working for Russian Football Union.

== Career ==
She started synchronized swimming at five in the Secondary Children Youth School of Olympic Reserve "Trud" of synchronized swimming "Yunost Moskvy" No. 19 in Yekateriburg. After reaching a certain level, Timanina moved to Moscow, where she started to train in the Sport School of preparation of Olympic Reserve - "Trud."

At the FINA World Cup in 2008 she was part of the junior National Team that took part in the competition, Angelika performed in the duet event with Daria Korobova and captured bronze medals in the "free routine".

In 2009 Angelika made her senior debut in the World Cup held in Rome as a member of the Russian national team (with Anastasia Davydova, Natalia Ishchenko, Daria Korobova, Anna Nasekina, Alexandra Patskevich, Svetlana Romashina, Alla Shishkina) and won two gold medals in the team events (free routine and technical routine).

In 2010, at the European Aquatic Championship in Budapest, Russian competitors completed a grand slam performance, winning gold medals in team and figures.

In 2011 at the World Championships in Aquatics, held in Shanghai (China), Timanina became a three-time champion in the competition combo routine and groups.

In 2012, the Russian became the Olympic champion in the team competition.

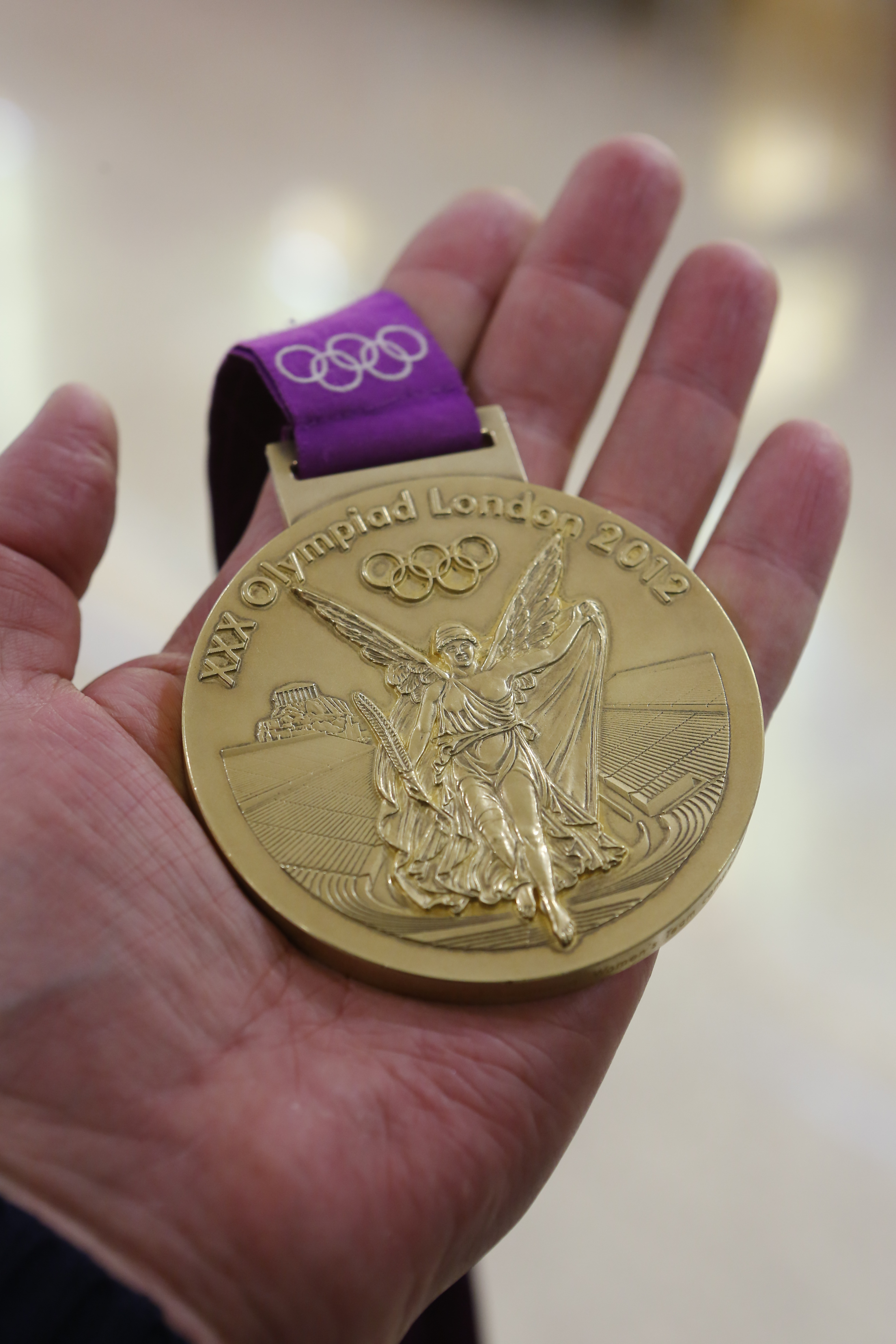
Timanina's gold medal from London 2012 Olympics temporarily kept at the Museum of Ural Mining and Metallurgical Company

== Education ==
She is a student of the Institute of Physical Culture, Ural State Pedagogical University (USPU), Yekaterinburg.

== Awards and titles ==
Honored Master of Sports of Russia.
