= Aigerim Zhexembinova =

Kazakhstani synchronized swimmer (born 1993)

Personal information
- Nationality: Kazakhstan
- Born: 5 September 1993 (age 32) Almaty, Kazakhstan
- Height: 1.64 m (5 ft 5 in)

Sport
- Sport: Swimming
- Strokes: Synchronized swimming
Medal record
Representing Kazakhstan
Synchronized swimming
Asian Games
Bronze medal – third place	2010 Guangzhou	Women's combination
- Updated on 22 May 2015

Aigerim Zhexembinova (Kazakh: Әйгерім Жексембинова, Äigerım Jeksembinova, born 5 September 1993) is a Kazakhstani synchronized swimmer. She competed in the women's duet at the 2012 Summer Olympics.
