= Chen Xiaojun =

Chinese synchronized swimmer

Personal information
- Born: August 3, 1992 (age 33) Zhanjiang, Guangdong, China

Sport
- Sport: Synchronised swimming
Medal record
Representing China
Olympic Games
Silver medal – second place	2012 London	Team
World Championships
Silver medal – second place	2011 Shanghai	Team, free routine
Asian Games
Gold medal – first place	2014 Incheon	Team

Chen Xiaojun (Chinese: 陈晓君; pinyin: Chén Xiǎojūn; born August 3, 1992) is a Chinese competitor in synchronized swimming. She won a silver medal in team competition at the 2012 Summer Olympics.
