= Synchronized swimming at the 2014 Asian Games =

- Venue: Munhak Park Tae-hwan Aquatics Center
- Dates: 20–23 September 2014
- Competitors: 76 from 9 nations

Synchronized swimming as Synchronized swimming at the 2014 Asian Games was held in Munhak Park Tae-hwan Aquatics Center, Incheon, South Korea from September 20 to 23, 2014. Only women's events were held in three competitions.

China once again dominated the competition by winning all three gold medals ahead of Japan with three silver medals.

== Schedule ==
T	Technical routine	F	Free routine

Event↓/Date →	20th Sat		21st Sun	22nd Mon	23rd Tue
Women's duet	T	F			
Women's team			T	F	
Women's combination					F

== Medalists ==
Event	Gold	Silver	Bronze
Duet	China; Huang Xuechen; Sun Wenyan; Sun Yijing	Japan; Yukiko Inui; Hikaru Kazumori; Risako Mitsui	Kazakhstan; Alexandra Nemich; Yekaterina Nemich; Amina Yermakhanova
Team	China; Chen Xiaojun; Gu Xiao; Guo Li; Li Xiaolu; Liang Xinping; Sun Wenyan; Sun Yijing; Tang Mengni; Yu Lele; Zeng Zhen	Japan; Miho Arai; Aika Hakoyama; Yukiko Inui; Mayo Itoyama; Hikaru Kazumori; Kei Marumo; Risako Mitsui; Kanami Nakamaki; Mai Nakamura; Kurumi Yoshida	North Korea; Jong Na-ri; Jong Yon-hui; Kang Un-ha; Kim Jin-gyong; Kim Jong-hui; Kim Ju-hye; Kim U-na; Ri Il-sim; Ri Ji-hyang; Yun Yu-jong
Combination	China; Chen Xiaojun; Gu Xiao; Guo Li; Huang Xuechen; Li Xiaolu; Liang Xinping; Sun Wenyan; Sun Yijing; Tang Mengni; Yin Chengxin; Yu Lele; Zeng Zhen	Japan; Miho Arai; Aika Hakoyama; Yukiko Inui; Mayo Itoyama; Hikaru Kazumori; Kei Marumo; Risako Mitsui; Natsumi Miyazaki; Kanami Nakamaki; Mai Nakamura; Kurumi Yoshida	Kazakhstan; Aigerim Anarbayeva; Xeniya Kachurina; Yuliya Kempel; Alina Matkova; Aisulu Nauryzbayeva; Alexandra Nemich; Yekaterina Nemich; Daniya Talgatova; Kristina Tynybayeva; Amina Yermakhanova; Olga Yezdakova

== Medal table ==
Rank	Nation	Gold	Silver	Bronze	Total
1	China (CHN)	3	0	0	3
2	Japan (JPN)	0	3	0	3
3	Kazakhstan (KAZ)	0	0	2	2
4	North Korea (PRK)	0	0	1	1
Totals (4 entries)		3	3	3	9

== Participating nations ==
A total of 76 athletes from 9 nations competed in synchronized swimming at the 2014 Asian Games:

- China (12)
- Hong Kong (8)
- Japan (11)
- Kazakhstan (11)
- Macau (10)
- Malaysia (3)
- North Korea (10)
- South Korea (2)
- Uzbekistan (9)
