= Synchronized swimming at the 2016 Summer Olympics =

Synchronized swimming at the Games of the XXXI Olympiad
- Venue: Maria Lenk Aquatic Center
- Dates: 14−20 August 2016
- No. of events: 2
- Competitors: 104 from 24 nations

Synchronized swimming competitions at the 2016 Summer Olympics in Rio de Janeiro were staged from 15 to 20 August at the Maria Lenk Aquatic Center. A total of 104 athletes competed in two medal events, namely the women's duet and the women's team.

== Qualification ==
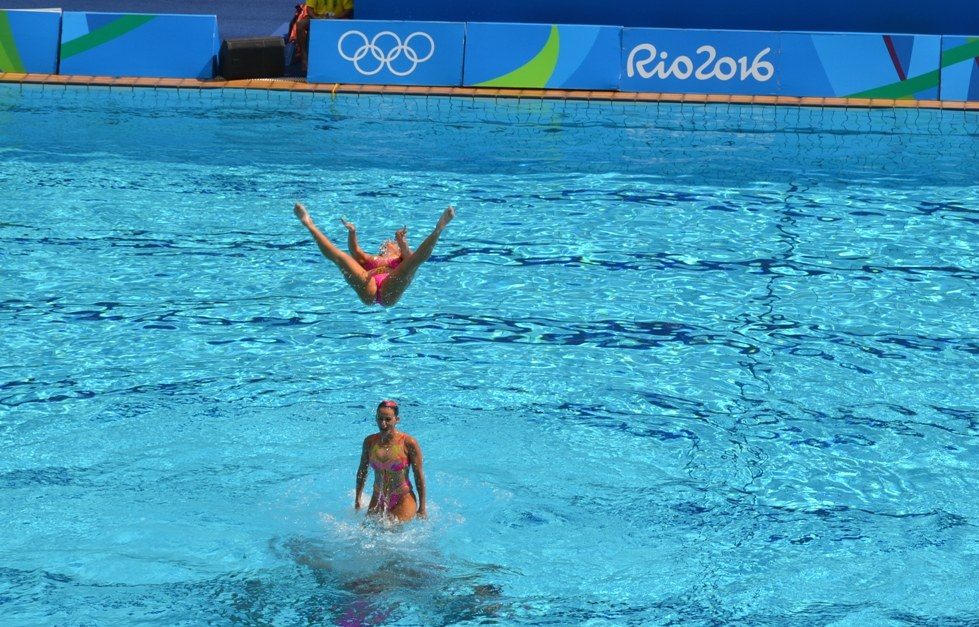
The Brazilian duet team, performing during competition at the Maria Lenk Aquatic Center.

For the team competitions, the best ranked NOC in each of the five continental championships, with the exception of the host country Brazil which represented the Pan American continent, obtained a secured place for the Games, while the remaining NOCs battled out for the three highest-ranked spots at the Olympic Qualification Tournament. For the duet, the best ranked NOC in each of the five continental championships that did not have a qualified team assured a secured spot, while the other eleven top-ranked NOCs were selected through Olympic Qualification Tournament. All eight NOCs that had already qualified in the team event must each automatically selected two synchronized swimmers to form a duet.

== Participating nations ==
- Argentina (2)
- Australia (9)
- Austria (2)
- Belarus (2)
- Brazil (9)
- Canada (2)
- China (9)
- Colombia (2)
- Czech Republic (2)
- Egypt (9)
- France (2)
- Great Britain (2)
- Greece (2)
- Israel (2)
- Italy (9)
- Japan (9)
- Kazakhstan (2)
- Mexico (2)
- Russia (9)
- Slovakia (2)
- Spain (2)
- Switzerland (2)
- United States (2)
- Ukraine (9)

== Competition Schedule ==
TR	Technical Routine	FR	Free Routine	F	Final

Event↓/Date →	Aug 14	Aug 15	Aug 16	Aug 17	Aug 18	Aug 19
Duet	FR	TR	F			
Team					TR	FR

== Medalists ==
Event	Gold	Silver	Bronze
Duet	Russia; Natalia Ishchenko; Svetlana Romashina	China; Huang Xuechen; Sun Wenyan	Japan; Yukiko Inui; Risako Mitsui
Team	Russia; Vlada Chigireva; Natalia Ishchenko; Svetlana Kolesnichenko; Aleksandra Patskevich; Svetlana Romashina; Alla Shishkina; Maria Shurochkina; Gelena Topilina; Elena Prokofyeva	China; Gu Xiao; Guo Li; Li Xiaolu; Liang Xinping; Sun Wenyan; Tang Mengni; Yin Chengxin; Zeng Zhen; Huang Xuechen	Japan; Aika Hakoyama; Yukiko Inui; Kei Marumo; Risako Mitsui; Kanami Nakamaki; Mai Nakamura; Kano Omata; Kurumi Yoshida; Aiko Hayashi

=== Medal table ===
Rank	Nation	Gold	Silver	Bronze	Total
1	Russia	2	0	0	2
2	China	0	2	0	2
3	Japan	0	0	2	2
Totals (3 entries)		2	2	2	6
