= Synchronised swimming at the 2015 World Aquatics Championships =

Synchronised swimming at the 2015 World Aquatics Championships was held between 25 July and 1 August 2015 in Kazan, Russia.

== Schedule ==
Nine events were held.

All time are local (UTC+3).

Date	Time	Round
25 July 2015	09:00	Solo technical routine preliminaries
25 July 2015	11:45	Mixed duet technical routine preliminaries
25 July 2015	14:00	Team technical routine preliminaries
25 July 2015	17:30	Solo technical routine final
26 July 2015	09:00	Duet technical routine preliminaries
26 July 2015	14:00	Free routine combination preliminaries
26 July 2015	17:30	Duet technical routine final
26 July 2015	19:15	Mixed duet technical routine final
27 July 2015	09:00	Solo free routine preliminaries
27 July 2015	17:30	Team technical routine final
28 July 2015	09:00	Duet free routine preliminaries
28 July 2015	11:45	Mixed duet free routine preliminaries
28 July 2015	17:30	Team free routine preliminaries
29 July 2015	17:30	Solo free routine final
30 July 2015	17:30	Duet free routine final
30 July 2015	19:15	Mixed duet free routine final
31 July 2015	17:30	Team free routine final
1 August 2015	17:30	Free routine combination final

== Medal summary ==
=== Medal table ===
Rank	Nation	Gold	Silver	Bronze	Total
1	Russia	8	1	0	9
2	United States	1	1	0	2
3	China	0	6	1	7
4	Spain	0	1	1	2
5	Japan	0	0	4	4
6	Italy	0	0	2	2
7	Ukraine	0	0	1	1
Totals (7 entries)		9	9	9	27

=== Medal events ===
Event	Gold		Silver		Bronze	
Solo Technical Routine	Svetlana Romashina; Russia	95.2680	Ona Carbonell; Spain	93.1284	Sun Wenyan; China	91.5479
Solo Free Routine	Natalia Ishchenko; Russia	97.2333	Huang Xuechen; China	95.7000	Ona Carbonell; Spain	94.9000
Duet Technical Routine	Russia; Natalia Ishchenko; Svetlana Romashina	95.4672	China; Huang Xuechen; Sun Wenyan	93.3279	Japan; Yukiko Inui; Risako Mitsui	92.0079
Duet Free Routine	Russia; Natalia Ishchenko; Svetlana Romashina	98.2000	China; Huang Xuechen; Sun Wenyan	95.9000	Ukraine; Lolita Ananasova; Anna Voloshyna	93.6000
Team Technical Routine	Russia; Vlada Chigireva; Svetlana Kolesnichenko; Alexandra Patskevich; Elena Prokofyeva; Alla Shishkina; Maria Shurochkina; Angelika Timanina; Gelena Topilina; Mikhaela Kalancha*; Liliia Nizamova*	95.7457	China; Gu Xiao; Guo Li; Huang Xuechen; Li Xiaolu; Liang Xinping; Sun Wenyan; Tang Mengni; Zeng Zhen; Xiao Yanning*; Yin Chengxin*	94.4605	Japan; Aika Hakoyama; Yukiko Inui; Kei Marumo; Risako Mitsui; Kanami Nakamaki; Mai Nakamura; Kano Omata; Kurumi Yoshida; Aiko Hayashi*; Asuka Tasaki*	92.4133
Team Free Routine	Russia; Vlada Chigireva; Svetlana Kolesnichenko; Alexandra Patskevich; Elena Prokofyeva; Alla Shishkina; Maria Shurochkina; Angelika Timanina; Gelena Topilina; Liliia Nizamova*; Darina Valitova*	98.4667	China; Gu Xiao; Guo Li; Li Xiaolu; Liang Xinping; Sun Wenyan; Tang Mengni; Yin Chengxin; Zeng Zhen; Huang Xuechen*; Xiao Yanning*	96.1333	Japan; Aika Hakoyama; Aiko Hayashi; Yukiko Inui; Kei Marumo; Risako Mitsui; Kanami Nakamaki; Mai Nakamura; Kurumi Yoshida; Kano Omata*; Asuka Tasaki*	93.9000
Free Routine Combination	Russia; Vlada Chigireva; Mikhaela Kalancha; Svetlana Kolesnichenko; Liliia Nizamova; Alexandra Patskevich; Elena Prokofyeva; Alla Shishkina; Maria Shurochkina; Angelika Timanina; Gelena Topilina; Svetlana Romashina*; Darina Valitova*	98.3000	China; Gu Xiao; Guo Li; Li Xiaolu; Liang Xinping; Sun Wenyan; Sun Yijing; Tang Mengni; Xiao Yanning; Yin Chengxin; Zeng Zhen; Huang Xuechen*; Li Mo*	96.2000	Japan; Aika Hakoyama; Aiko Hayashi; Yukiko Inui; Kei Marumo; Risako Mitsui; Kanami Nakamaki; Mai Nakamura; Kano Omata; Asuka Tasaki; Kurumi Yoshida	93.8000
Mixed Duet Free Routine	Russia; Aleksandr Maltsev; Darina Valitova	91.7333	United States; Kristina Lum; Bill May	91.4667	Italy; Giorgio Minisini; Mariangela Perrupato	89.3333
Mixed Duet Technical Routine	United States; Christina Jones; Bill May	88.5108	Russia; Aleksandr Maltsev; Darina Valitova	88.2986	Italy; Manila Flamini; Giorgio Minisini	86.3640

*Reserve
