= Artistic swimming at the 2019 World Aquatics Championships – Duet free routine =

Duet free routine at the 2019 World Aquatics Championships
- Venue: Yeomju Gymnasium
- Location: Gwangju, South Korea
- Dates: 16, 18 July
- Competitors: 90 from 45 nations
- Teams: 45
- Winning points: 97.5000

Medalists
gold medal	Svetlana Kolesnichenko; Svetlana Romashina	Russia
silver medal	Huang Xuechen; Sun Wenyan	China
bronze medal	Marta Fiedina; Anastasiya Savchuk	Ukraine

The Duet free routine competition at the 2019 World Aquatics Championships was held on 16 and 18 July 2019.

== Results ==
The preliminary round was started on 16 July at 11:00. The final was held on 18 July at 19:00.

Green denotes finalists

Rank	Nation	Swimmers	Preliminary		Final	
Rank	Nation	Swimmers	Points	Rank	Points	Rank
1st place, gold medalist(s)	Russia	Svetlana Kolesnichenko; Svetlana Romashina	96.6667	1	97.5000	1
2nd place, silver medalist(s)	China	Huang Xuechen; Sun Wenyan	94.5333	2	95.7667	2
3rd place, bronze medalist(s)	Ukraine	Marta Fiedina; Anastasiya Savchuk	93.1333	3	94.1000	3
4	Japan	Yukiko Inui; Megumu Yoshida	92.4333	4	93.0000	4
5	Spain	Ona Carbonell; Paula Ramírez	91.6000	5	91.7000	5
6	Italy	Linda Cerruti; Costanza Ferro	90.4667	6	91.0000	6
7	Canada	Claudia Holzner; Jacqueline Simoneau	89.6000	7	89.7667	7
8	France	Charlotte Tremble; Laura Tremble	86.7333	10	88.0000	8
9	Greece	Evangelia Papazoglou; Evangelia Platanioti	87.8667	8	87.3333	9
10	Austria	Anna-Maria Alexandri; Eirini-Marina Alexandri	86.7667	9	87.1000	10
11	Mexico	Nuria Diosdado; Joana Jiménez	85.8667	11	86.1000	11
12	United States	Anita Alvarez; Ruby Remati	84.5000	12	83.6333	12
13	Netherlands	Bregje de Brouwer; Noortje de Brouwer	84.4000	13	Did not advance	
14	Great Britain	Kate Shortman; Isabelle Thorpe	83.8000	14	Did not advance	
15	Belarus	Vasilina Khandoshka; Valeryia Valasach	83.1000	15	Did not advance	
15	Kazakhstan	Alexandra Nemich; Yekaterina Nemich	83.1000	15	Did not advance	
17	Switzerland	Vivienne Koch; Noemi Peschl	82.1667	17	Did not advance	
18	Israel	Eden Blecher; Shelly Bobritsky	81.8333	18	Did not advance	
19	Germany	Marlene Bojer; Daniela Reinhardt	79.9667	19	Did not advance	
20	Colombia	Estefanía Álvarez; Mónica Arango	79.0333	20	Did not advance	
21	Liechtenstein	Lara Mechnig; Marluce Schierscher	78.9000	21	Did not advance	
22	Uzbekistan	Anna Eltisheva; Anastasiya Morozova	77.7000	22	Did not advance	
23	Singapore	Debbie Soh; Miya Yong	77.2333	23	Did not advance	
24	Slovakia	Nada Daabousová; Diana Miškechová	77.1333	24	Did not advance	
25	Czech Republic	Alžběta Dufková; Vendula Mazánková	76.8667	25	Did not advance	
26	San Marino	Jasmine Verbena; Jasmine Zonzini	76.7000	26	Did not advance	
27	Egypt	Hanna Hiekal; Jayda Sharaf	76.2000	27	Did not advance	
28	Hungary	Dávid Janka; Boglárka Gács	76.0333	28	Did not advance	
29	Argentina	Camila Arregui; Trinidad López	75.9333	29	Did not advance	
30	Serbia	Nevena Dimitrijević; Jelena Kontić	75.9000	30	Did not advance	
31	Portugal	Maria Gonçalves; Cheila Vieira	75.6333	31	Did not advance	
32	Turkey	Defne Bakırcı; Mısra Gündeş	75.1667	32	Did not advance	
33	South Korea	Baek Seo-yeon; Koo Ye-mo	75.0333	33	Did not advance	
34	Chile	Isidora Letelier; Natalie Lubascher	74.3333	34	Did not advance	
35	Australia	Rose Stackpole; Amie Thompson	74.2667	35	Did not advance	
36	Bulgaria	Aleksandra Atanasova; Dalia Penkova	74.1667	36	Did not advance	
37	Aruba	Abigail de Veer; Kyra Hoevertsz	74.1667	37	Did not advance	
38	Poland	Gabriela Damentka; Aleksandra Filipiuk	72.1333	38	Did not advance	
39	New Zealand	Eva Morris; Isobel Pettit	68.8667	39	Did not advance	
40	South Africa	Emma Manners-Wood; Laura Strugnell	67.3333	40	Did not advance	
41	Cuba	Stephany Urbina; Cire Zuferri	66.9667	41	Did not advance	
42	Hong Kong	Haruka Kawazoe; Christie Poon	66.7667	42	Did not advance	
43	Thailand	Pongpimporn Pongsuwan; Supitchaya Songpan	65.8667	43	Did not advance	
44	Costa Rica	Natalia Jenkins; Valeria Lizano	63.9000	44	Did not advance	
45	Macau	Chio Un Tong; Chio Weng Tong	63.3333	45	Did not advance	
	Brazil	Luisa Borges; Maria Coutinho	Did not start			
