= Artistic swimming at the 2019 World Aquatics Championships – Duet technical routine =

Duet technical routine at the 2019 World Aquatics Championships
- Venue: Yeomju Gymnasium
- Location: Gwangju, South Korea
- Dates: 12–14 July
- Competitors: 90 from 45 nations
- Winning points: 95.9010

Medalists
gold medal	Svetlana Kolesnichenko; Svetlana Romashina	Russia
silver medal	Huang Xuechen; Sun Wenyan	China
bronze medal	Marta Fiedina; Anastasiya Savchuk	Ukraine

The Duet technical routine competition at the 2019 World Aquatics Championships was held on 12 and 14 July 2019.

== Results ==
The preliminary round was started on 12 July at 16:00. The final was started on 14 July at 19:00.

Green denotes finalists

Rank	Nation	Swimmers	Preliminary		Final	
Rank	Nation	Swimmers	Points	Rank	Points	Rank
1st place, gold medalist(s)	Russia	Svetlana Kolesnichenko; Svetlana Romashina	95.9501	1	95.9010	1
2nd place, silver medalist(s)	China	Huang Xuechen; Sun Wenyan	93.4148	2	94.0072	2
3rd place, bronze medalist(s)	Ukraine	Marta Fiedina; Anastasiya Savchuk	92.0610	3	92.5847	3
4	Japan	Yukiko Inui; Megumu Yoshida	91.9210	4	92.1116	4
5	Italy	Linda Cerruti; Costanza Ferro	88.6622	5	90.1743	5
6	Canada	Claudia Holzner; Jacqueline Simoneau	87.7412	6	88.8659	6
7	Spain	Paula Ramírez; Sara Saldaña	87.4027	7	87.2960	7
8	Austria	Anna-Maria Alexandri; Eirini-Marina Alexandri	86.1410	8	87.0378	8
9	Greece	Evangelia Papazoglou; Evangelia Platanioti	85.6252	10	86.4975	9
10	France	Charlotte Tremble; Laura Tremble	85.7983	9	86.2420	10
11	Mexico	Nuria Diosdado; Joana Jiménez	84.5751	11	84.9938	11
12	United States	Anita Alvarez; Ruby Remati	84.4615	12	84.0190	12
13	Netherlands	Bregje de Brouwer; Noortje de Brouwer	83.8188	13	did not advance	
14	Great Britain	Kate Shortman; Isabelle Thorpe	83.5904	14	did not advance	
15	Kazakhstan	Alexandra Nemich; Yekaterina Nemich	82.4232	15	did not advance	
16	Belarus	Vasilina Khandoshka; Valeryia Valasach	81.8044	16	did not advance	
17	Brazil	Luisa Borges; Maria Coutinho	81.0395	17	did not advance	
18	Switzerland	Vivienne Koch; Noemi Peschl	80.8136	18	did not advance	
19	Israel	Eden Blecher; Shelly Bobritsky	80.3788	19	did not advance	
20	Germany	Marlene Bojer; Daniela Reinhardt	79.8807	20	did not advance	
21	Colombia	Estefanía Álvarez; Mónica Arango	79.1640	21	did not advance	
22	Liechtenstein	Lara Mechnig; Marluce Schierscher	78.1800	22	did not advance	
23	Uzbekistan	Anna Eltisheva; Anastasiya Morozova	77.6988	23	did not advance	
24	Slovakia	Nada Daabousová; Diana Miškechová	76.6795	24	did not advance	
25	Portugal	Maria Gonçalves; Cheila Vieira	76.2328	25	did not advance	
26	Turkey	Defne Bakırcı; Mısra Gündeş	76.1084	26	did not advance	
27	Singapore	Debbie Soh; Miya Yong	76.0941	27	did not advance	
28	Egypt	Laila Mohsen; Dara Tamer	76.0662	28	did not advance	
29	Hungary	Janka Dávid; Boglárka Gács	75.8968	29	did not advance	
30	Argentina	Camila Arregui; Trinidad López	75.5435	30	did not advance	
31	South Korea	Baek Seo-yeon; Lee Ri-young	74.8296	31	did not advance	
32	Czech Republic	Karolína Klusková; Aneta Mrázková	74.5514	32	did not advance	
33	San Marino	Jasmine Verbena; Jasmine Zonzini	74.3178	33	did not advance	
34	Serbia	Nevena Dimitrijević; Jelena Kontić	74.2928	34	did not advance	
35	Australia	Rose Stackpole; Amie Thompson	74.1141	35	did not advance	
36	Chile	Isidora Letelier; Natalie Lubascher	73.3622	36	did not advance	
37	Aruba	Abigail de Veer; Kyra Hoevertsz	72.3827	37	did not advance	
38	Bulgaria	Aleksandra Atanasova; Dalia Penkova	72.3751	38	did not advance	
39	Poland	Gabriela Damentka; Aleksandra Filipiuk	71.2235	39	did not advance	
40	Cuba	Gabriela Alpajón; Carelys Valdes	66.7881	40	did not advance	
41	New Zealand	Eva Morris; Eden Worsley	65.8879	41	did not advance	
42	South Africa	Emma Manners-Wood; Laura Strugnell	65.4588	42	did not advance	
43	Costa Rica	Natalia Jenkins; Valeria Lizano	63.9830	43	did not advance	
44	Thailand	Pongpimporn Pongsuwan; Arpapat Saengrusamee	62.1222	44	did not advance	
45	Macau	Chan Chi Ian; Chan Ka Hei	60.7235	45	did not advance	
