= Artistic swimming at the 2018 Asian Games =

- Venue: Gelora Bung Karno Aquatic Stadium
- Dates: 27–29 August 2018
- Competitors: 94 from 11 nations

Artistic swimming at the 2018 Asian Games was held at the Gelora Bung Karno Aquatic Stadium, Gelora Bung Karno Sports Complex, Jakarta, Indonesia from 27 August to 29 August 2018.

Only women's events were held in two competitions. China once again dominated the competition by winning all two gold medals ahead of Japan with two silver medals.

== Schedule ==
T	Technical routine	F	Free routine

Event↓/Date →	27th Mon	28th Tue	29th Wed	
Women's duet	T	F		
Women's team			T	F

== Medalists ==
Event	Gold	Silver	Bronze
Duet	China; Jiang Tingting; Jiang Wenwen	Japan; Yukiko Inui; Megumu Yoshida	Kazakhstan; Alexandra Nemich; Yekaterina Nemich
Team	China; Chang Hao; Feng Yu; Guo Li; Liang Xinping; Wang Liuyi; Wang Qianyi; Xiao Yanning; Yin Chengxin	Japan; Juka Fukumura; Yukiko Inui; Moeka Kijima; Okina Kyogoku; Kei Marumo; Kano Omata; Mayu Tsukamoto; Mashiro Yasunaga; Megumu Yoshida	North Korea; Cha Ye-gyong; Jang Hyon-ok; Jong Na-ri; Ko Su-rim; Min Hae-yon; Mun Hye-song; Ri Il-sim; Ri Sol; Yun Yu-jong

== Medal table ==
Rank	Nation	Gold	Silver	Bronze	Total
1	China (CHN)	2	0	0	2
2	Japan (JPN)	0	2	0	2
3	Kazakhstan (KAZ)	0	0	1	1
3	North Korea (PRK)	0	0	1	1
Totals (4 entries)		2	2	2	6

== Participating nations ==
A total of 94 athletes from 11 nations competed in artistic swimming at the 2018 Asian Games:

- China (10)
- Hong Kong (8)
- Indonesia (8)
- Japan (9)
- Kazakhstan (9)
- Macau (10)
- Malaysia (3)
- North Korea (9)
- Singapore (8)
- South Korea (10)
- Uzbekistan (10)
