= Synchronised swimming at the 2015 World Aquatics Championships – Duet technical routine =

Duet technical routine at the 2015 World Aquatics Championships
- Dates: 26 July
- Competitors: 76 from 38 nations
- Winning points: 95.4672

Medalists
gold medal	Natalia Ishchenko; Svetlana Romashina	Russia
silver medal	Huang Xuechen; Sun Wenyan	China
bronze medal	Yukiko Inui; Risako Mitsui	Japan

The Duet technical routine competition of the synchronised swimming events at the 2015 World Aquatics Championships was held on 26 July 2015.

== Results ==
The preliminary round was held at 09:00. The final was held at 17:30.

Green denotes finalists

Rank	Nation	Swimmers	Preliminary		Final	
Rank	Nation	Swimmers	Points	Rank	Points	Rank
1st place, gold medalist(s)	Russia	Natalia Ishchenko; Svetlana Romashina	94.5715	1	95.4672	1
2nd place, silver medalist(s)	China	Huang Xuechen; Sun Wenyan	92.2791	2	93.3279	2
3rd place, bronze medalist(s)	Japan	Yukiko Inui; Risako Mitsui	90.3504	3	92.0079	3
4	Ukraine	Lolita Ananasova; Anna Voloshyna	90.2596	4	91.6770	4
5	Spain	Clara Camacho; Ona Carbonell	89.3526	5	90.0157	5
6	Canada	Jacqueline Simoneau; Karine Thomas	87.6537	6	89.4176	6
7	Italy	Linda Cerruti; Costanza Ferro	87.6477	7	87.5775	7
8	Greece	Evangelia Koutidi; Evangelia Platanioti	84.1564	9	85.3878	8
9	France	Laura Augé; Margaux Chrétien	84.9664	8	84.7751	9
10	Mexico	Karem Achach; Nuria Diosdado	83.1534	10	83.8304	10
11	Austria	Anna-Maria Alexandri; Eirini Alexandri	82.3507	12	83.5146	11
12	United States	Anita Alvarez; Mariya Koroleva	83.0493	11	83.5089	12
13	North Korea	Kang Un-ha; Kim Un-a	82.0469	13		
14	Brazil	Luisa Borges; Maria Eduarda Miccuci	81.7065	14		
15	Kazakhstan	Alexandra Nemich; Yekaterina Nemich	80.9472	15		
16	Czech Republic	Soňa Bernardová; Alžběta Dufková	80.6425	16		
17	Switzerland	Sophie Giger; Sascia Kraus	80.1645	17		
18	Argentina	Etel Sánchez; Sofía Sánchez	79.8065	18		
19	Belarus	Iryna Limanouskaya; Veronika Yesipovich	79.1333	19		
20	Israel	Anastasia Gloushkov; Ievgeniia Tetelbaum	79.0927	20		
21	Slovakia	Naďa Daabousová; Jana Labáthová	77.9122	21		
22	Colombia	Estefanía Álvarez; Mónica Arango	77.9068	22		
23	Egypt	Samia Ahmed; Dara Hassanien	75.1661	23		
24	Great Britain	Jodie Cowie; Genevieve Randall	74.6512	24		
25	Uzbekistan	Yuliya Kim; Anastasiya Ruzmetova	73.9526	25		
26	Turkey	Defne Bakırcı; Mısra Gündeş	72.7531	26		
27	Chile	Kelley Kobler; Natalie Lubascher	72.2984	27		
28	Australia	Bianca Hammett; Nikita Pablo	72.0011	28		
29	Singapore	Stephanie Chen Mei Qi; Debbie Soh Li Fei	71.6715	29		
30	Aruba	Anouk Eman; Kyra Hoevertsz	71.2453	30		
31	Bulgaria	Daniela Bozadzhieva; Hristina Damyanova	71.1065	31		
32	Venezuela	Oriana Carillo; Greisy Gómez	71.0905	32		
33	South Korea	Uhm Ji-wan; Won Ji-soo	69.4136	33		
34	Portugal	Ana Baptista; María Queiroga	68.6962	34		
35	Costa Rica	Fiorella Calvo; Natalia Jenkins	68.2496	35		
36	Hong Kong	Cho Man Yee Nora; Michelle Hoi Ting Lau	65.7396	36		
37	South Africa	Emma Manners-Wood; Laura Strugnell	65.3539	37		
38	Cuba	Cristy Alfonso; Melissa Alonso	64.8561	38		
