= Synchronised swimming at the 2015 World Aquatics Championships – Team technical routine =

Team technical routine at the 2015 World Aquatics Championships
- Dates: 25–27 July
- Competitors: 200 from 25 nations
- Winning points: 95.7457

Medalists
gold medal	Vlada Chigireva; Svetlana Kolesnichenko; Alexandra Patskevich; Elena Prokofyeva; Alla Shishkina; Maria Shurochkina; Angelika Timanina; Gelena Topilina; Mikhaela Kalancha (reserve); Liliia Nizamova (reserve)	Russia
silver medal	Gu Xiao; Guo Li; Huang Xuechen; Li Xiaolu; Liang Xinping; Sun Wenyan; Tang Mengni; Zeng Zhen; Xiao Yanning (reserve); Yin Chengxin (reserve)	China
bronze medal	Aika Hakoyama; Yukiko Inui; Kei Marumo; Risako Mitsui; Kanami Nakamaki; Mai Nakamura; Kano Omata; Kurumi Yoshida; Aiko Hayashi (reserve); Asuka Tasaki (reserve)	Japan

The Team technical routine competition of the synchronised swimming events at the 2015 World Aquatics Championships was held on 25 and 27 July 2015.

== Results ==
The preliminary round was held on 25 July at 14:00. The final was held on 27 July at 17:30.

Green denotes finalists

Rank	Nation	Preliminary		Final	
Rank	Nation	Points	Rank	Points	Rank
1st place, gold medalist(s)	Russia	95.1829	1	95.7457	1
2nd place, silver medalist(s)	China	92.1032	2	94.4605	2
3rd place, bronze medalist(s)	Japan	91.6516	4	92.4133	3
4	Ukraine	91.8720	3	91.7690	4
5	Spain	91.3755	5	90.8720	5
6	Canada	88.9029	6	88.8885	6
7	Italy	88.0673	7	88.0516	7
8	France	85.1487	8	85.1794	8
9	Mexico	84.7543	9	84.8431	9
10	United States	84.3882	10	83.4289	10
11	Brazil	83.0283	12	82.9372	11
12	Greece	83.6782	11	82.3897	12
13	North Korea	81.9749	13		
14	Belarus	80.2507	14		
15	Switzerland	79.3083	15		
16	Kazakhstan	77.0015	16		
17	Egypt	73.6496	17		
18	Venezuela	72.1466	18		
19	Singapore	71.5776	19		
20	Australia	70.8602	20		
21	New Zealand	69.4142	21		
22	Macau	67.9021	22		
23	Costa Rica	67.3454	23		
24	Indonesia	62.7381	24		
25	Hong Kong	61.2658	25		
