= Kazakhstan at the 2015 World Aquatics Championships =

- Flag of Kazakhstan
- FINA code: KAZ
- National federation: Swimming Federation of the Republic of Kazakhstan
- Website: www.aquatics.kz/en

in Kazan, Russia
- Competitors: 45 in 4 sports
- Medals: Gold 0 Silver 0 Bronze 0 Total 0

World Aquatics Championships appearances
- 1994; 1998; 2001; 2003; 2005; 2007; 2009; 2011; 2013; 2015; 2017; 2019; 2022; 2023; 2024

Other related appearances
- Soviet Union (1973–1991)

Kazakhstan competed at the 2015 World Aquatics Championships in Kazan, Russia, from 24 July to 9 August 2015.

== Open water swimming ==
Kazakhstan has qualified five swimmers to compete in the open water marathon.

Athlete	Event	Time	Rank
Timur Abzhanov	Men's 5 km	1:01:54.2	42
Kennesary Kenenbayev	Men's 5 km	59:47.0	38
Kennesary Kenenbayev	Men's 10 km	2:05:43.6	61
Vitaliy Khudyakov	Men's 10 km	1:51:33.7	32
Vitaliy Khudyakov	Men's 25 km	5:03:16.3	13
Mariya Ivanova	Women's 5 km	1:09:22.8	37
Mariya Ivanova	Women's 10 km	2:20:44.9	50
Xeniya Romanchuk	Women's 10 km	2:16:23.8	47
Xeniya Romanchuk	Women's 25 km	did not finish	
Kennesary Kenenbayev; Vitaliy Khudyakov; Xeniya Romanchuk	Mixed team	1:02:12.7	20

== Swimming ==
Kazakh swimmers have achieved qualifying standards in the following events (up to a maximum of 2 swimmers in each event at the A-standard entry time, and 1 at the B-standard):

Men

Athlete	Event	Heat		Semifinal		Final	
Athlete	Event	Time	Rank	Time	Rank	Time	Rank
Dmitriy Balandin	50 m breaststroke	27.47	=13 Q	27.24 AS	9	did not advance	
Dmitriy Balandin	100 m breaststroke	59.38	3 Q	59.39	4 Q	59.42	4
Dmitriy Balandin	200 m breaststroke	2:09.76	4 Q	2:09.22	6 Q	2:09.58	6

Women

Athlete	Event	Heat		Semifinal		Final	
Athlete	Event	Time	Rank	Time	Rank	Time	Rank
Yekaterina Rudenko	50 m backstroke	28.67	=20	did not advance			
Yekaterina Rudenko	100 m backstroke	1:01.62	=29	did not advance			

== Synchronized swimming ==
Kazakhstan fielded a full squad of twelve synchronized swimmers to compete in each of the following events at the World Championships.

Athlete	Event	Preliminaries		Final	
Athlete	Event	Points	Rank	Points	Rank
Alexandra Nemich; Yekaterina Nemich	Duet technical routine	80.9472	15	did not advance	
Aigerim Anarbayeva; Aigerim Issayeva*; Xeniya Kachurina; Yuliya Kempel; Aida Meimantay*; Alina Matkova; Aisulu Nauryzbayeva; Kristina Tynbayeva; Amina Yermakhanova; Aigerim Zhexembinova	Team technical routine	77.0015	16	did not advance	
Aigerim Anarbayeva; Aigerim Issayeva; Xeniya Kachurina; Yuliya Kempel; Aida Meimantay; Alina Matkova; Aisulu Nauryzbayeva; Alexandra Nemich*; Yekaterina Nemich*; Kristina Tynbayeva; Amina Yermakhanova; Aigerim Zhexembinova	Free routine combination	80.1000	14	did not advance	

== Water polo ==
=== Men's tournament ===
Team roster

- Aleksandr Fyodorov
- Sergey Gubarev
- Alexandr Axenov
- Roman Pilipenko
- Vladimir Ushakov
- Alexey Shmider
- Murat Shakenov
- Anton Koliadenko
- Rustam Ukumanov
- Yevgeniy Medvedev
- Ravil Manafov
- Branko Pekovich
- Valeriy Shlemov

Group play

Pos	Team	Pld	W	D	L	GF	GA	GD	Pts	Qualification
1	Hungary	3	3	0	0	52	13	+39	6	Advanced to quarterfinals
2	Kazakhstan	3	2	0	1	34	24	+10	4	Advanced to playoffs
3	South Africa	3	1	0	2	17	37	−20	2	Advanced to playoffs
4	Argentina	3	0	0	3	17	46	−29	0	

Source: SportResult.com
Rules for classification: 1) points; 2) head-to-head points; 3) head-to-head goal difference; 4) head-to-head number of goals scored; 5) goal difference.

27 July 2015; 17:30	Report	Hungary	14–5	Kazakhstan	Kazan; Attendance: 1,180; Referees: Joseph Peila (USA), Cory Williams (NZL)
27 July 2015; 17:30	Report	Score by quarters: 4–0, 3–0, 5–2, 2–3			Kazan; Attendance: 1,180; Referees: Joseph Peila (USA), Cory Williams (NZL)
27 July 2015; 17:30	Report	Hárai 4	Goals	Ushakov 2	Kazan; Attendance: 1,180; Referees: Joseph Peila (USA), Cory Williams (NZL)

29 July 2015; 10:50	Report	Kazakhstan	15–7	Argentina	Kazan; Attendance: 1,016; Referees: Nenad Peris (CRO), Hatem Gaber (EGY)
29 July 2015; 10:50	Report	Score by quarters: 5–2, 3–3, 5–1, 2–1			Kazan; Attendance: 1,016; Referees: Nenad Peris (CRO), Hatem Gaber (EGY)
29 July 2015; 10:50	Report	Axenov, Pekovich 4	Goals	Yañez 3	Kazan; Attendance: 1,016; Referees: Nenad Peris (CRO), Hatem Gaber (EGY)

31 July 2015; 09:30	Report	South Africa	3–14	Kazakhstan	Kazan; Attendance: 884; Referees: Fabio Toffoli (BRA), Hatem Gaber (EGY)
31 July 2015; 09:30	Report	Score by quarters: 0–4, 1–3, 1–5, 1–2			Kazan; Attendance: 884; Referees: Fabio Toffoli (BRA), Hatem Gaber (EGY)
31 July 2015; 09:30	Report	three players 1	Goals	Axenov 5	Kazan; Attendance: 884; Referees: Fabio Toffoli (BRA), Hatem Gaber (EGY)

Playoffs

2 August 2015; 18:50	Report	Kazakhstan	8–12	Montenegro	Kazan; Attendance: 2,896; Referees: Joseph Peila (USA), Daniel Flahive (AUS)
2 August 2015; 18:50	Report	Score by quarters: 3–2, 2–3, 1–5, 2–2			Kazan; Attendance: 2,896; Referees: Joseph Peila (USA), Daniel Flahive (AUS)
2 August 2015; 18:50	Report	Gubarev 3	Goals	Brguljan, Janović 3	Kazan; Attendance: 2,896; Referees: Joseph Peila (USA), Daniel Flahive (AUS)

9th–12th place semifinals

4 August 2015; 12:10	Report	Canada	9–7	Kazakhstan	Kazan; Attendance: 421; Referees: Stanko Ivanovski (MNE), German Moller (ARG)
4 August 2015; 12:10	Report	Score by quarters: 1–2, 5–0, 2–3, 1–2			Kazan; Attendance: 421; Referees: Stanko Ivanovski (MNE), German Moller (ARG)
4 August 2015; 12:10	Report	Conway 4	Goals	Axenov 3	Kazan; Attendance: 421; Referees: Stanko Ivanovski (MNE), German Moller (ARG)

Eleventh place game

6 August 2015; 10:50	Report	Kazakhstan	11–7	South Africa	Kazan; Attendance: 450; Referees: Fabio Toffoli (BRA), Tadao Tahara (JPN)
6 August 2015; 10:50	Report	Score by quarters: 4–2, 1–2, 2–1, 4–2			Kazan; Attendance: 450; Referees: Fabio Toffoli (BRA), Tadao Tahara (JPN)
6 August 2015; 10:50	Report	Axenov 7	Goals	P. Le Roux 3	Kazan; Attendance: 450; Referees: Fabio Toffoli (BRA), Tadao Tahara (JPN)

=== Women's tournament ===
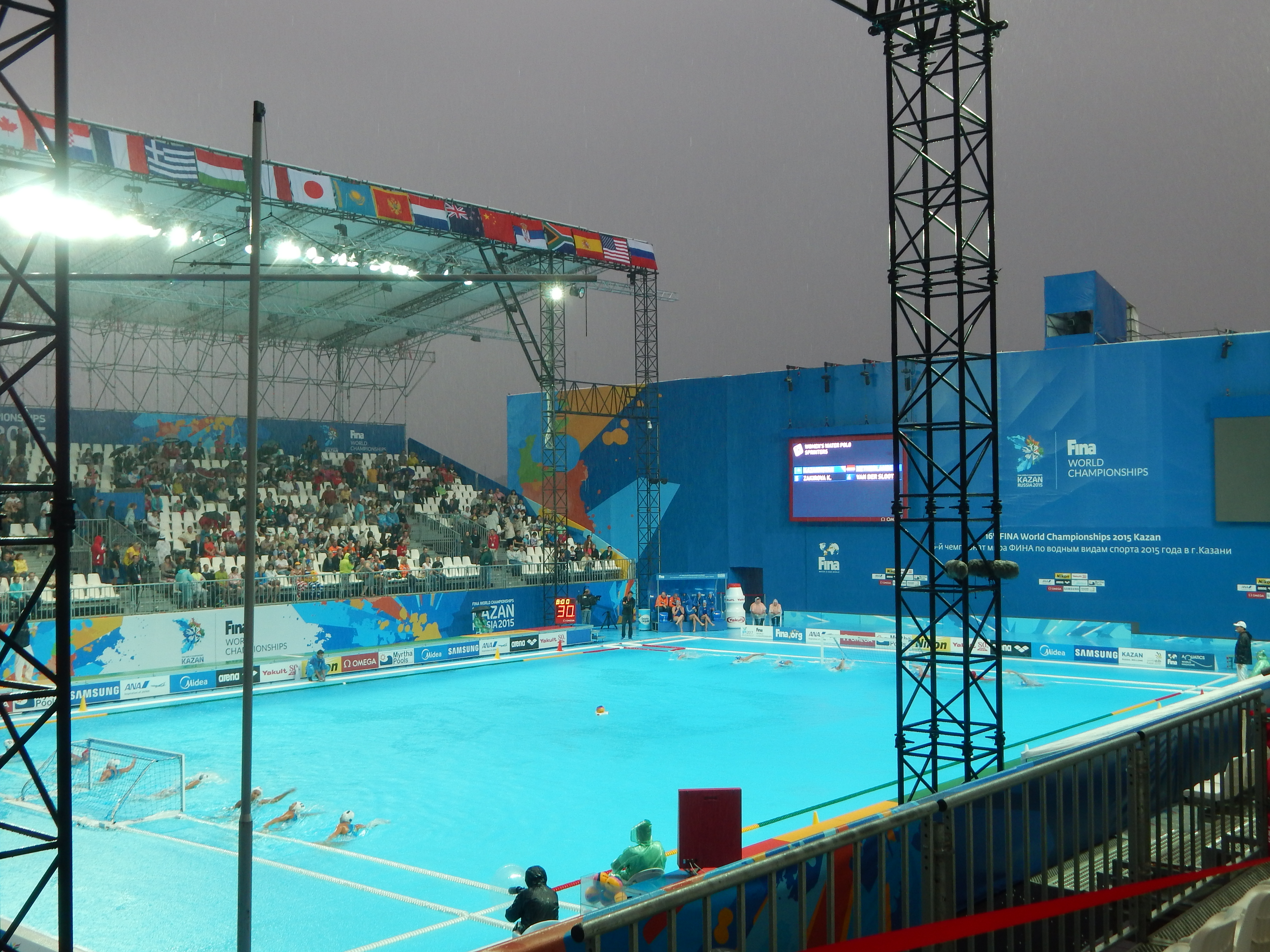
Playoff between the Netherlands and Kazakhstan was held during a rainstorm

Team roster

- Alexandra Zharkimbayeva
- Aruzhan Yegemberdiyeva
- Aizhan Akilbayeva
- Anna Turova
- Kamila Zakirova
- Oxana Tikhonova
- Zamira Myrzabekova
- Oxana Saichuk
- Darya Muravyeva
- Darya Roga
- Anastassiya Mirshina
- Assem Mussarova
- Darya Ryzhinskaya

Group play

Pos	Team	Pld	W	D	L	GF	GA	GD	Pts	Qualification
1	Spain	3	3	0	0	49	15	+34	6	Advanced to quarterfinals
2	Canada	3	2	0	1	38	22	+16	4	Advanced to playoffs
3	Kazakhstan	3	1	0	2	25	35	−10	2	Advanced to playoffs
4	New Zealand	3	0	0	3	12	52	−40	0	

Source: SportResult.com
Rules for classification: 1) points; 2) head-to-head points; 3) head-to-head goal difference; 4) head-to-head number of goals scored; 5) goal difference.

26 July 2015; 10:50	Report	Kazakhstan	7–14	Spain	Kazan; Attendance: 993; Referees: Anne Grandin (FRA), Ni Shi Wei (CHN)
26 July 2015; 10:50	Report	Score by quarters: 0–4, 2–5, 1–1, 4–4			Kazan; Attendance: 993; Referees: Anne Grandin (FRA), Ni Shi Wei (CHN)
26 July 2015; 10:50	Report	Mirshina 3	Goals	Pareja 5	Kazan; Attendance: 993; Referees: Anne Grandin (FRA), Ni Shi Wei (CHN)

28 July 2015; 21:30	Report	Canada	17–4	Kazakhstan	Kazan; Attendance: 240; Referees: György Kun (HUN), Ni Shi Wei (CHN)
28 July 2015; 21:30	Report	Score by quarters: 4–1, 2–1, 3–2, 8–0			Kazan; Attendance: 240; Referees: György Kun (HUN), Ni Shi Wei (CHN)
28 July 2015; 21:30	Report	M. Eggens 5	Goals	Mirshina 2	Kazan; Attendance: 240; Referees: György Kun (HUN), Ni Shi Wei (CHN)

30 July 2015; 17:30	Report	Kazakhstan	14–4	New Zealand	Kazan; Attendance: 985; Referees: Ursula Wengenroth (SUI), Tadao Tahara (JPN)
30 July 2015; 17:30	Report	Score by quarters: 3–0, 4–0, 4–1, 3–3			Kazan; Attendance: 985; Referees: Ursula Wengenroth (SUI), Tadao Tahara (JPN)
30 July 2015; 17:30	Report	Akilbayeva 6	Goals	D. Lewis 3	Kazan; Attendance: 985; Referees: Ursula Wengenroth (SUI), Tadao Tahara (JPN)

Playoffs

1 August 2015; 17:30	Report	Kazakhstan	1–21	Netherlands	Kazan; Attendance: 2,150; Referees: Joseph Peila (AUS), Cory Williams (NZL)
1 August 2015; 17:30	Report	Score by quarters: 0–4, 0–7, 0–6, 1–4			Kazan; Attendance: 2,150; Referees: Joseph Peila (AUS), Cory Williams (NZL)
1 August 2015; 17:30	Report	Mirshina 1	Goals	Smit 5	Kazan; Attendance: 2,150; Referees: Joseph Peila (AUS), Cory Williams (NZL)

9th–12th place semifinals

3 August 2015; 13:30	Report	Kazakhstan	5–10	Brazil	Kazan; Attendance: 155; Referees: Anne Grandin (FRA), Ni Shi Wei (CHN)
3 August 2015; 13:30	Report	Score by quarters: 1–2, 0–4, 2–4, 2–0			Kazan; Attendance: 155; Referees: Anne Grandin (FRA), Ni Shi Wei (CHN)
3 August 2015; 13:30	Report	Mirshina 3	Goals	Chiappini 3	Kazan; Attendance: 155; Referees: Anne Grandin (FRA), Ni Shi Wei (CHN)

Eleventh place game

5 August 2015; 10:50	Report	Canada	20–4	Kazakhstan	Kazan; Attendance: 235; Referees: Anne Grandin (FRA), Cory Williams (NZL)
5 August 2015; 10:50	Report	Score by quarters: 4–1, 5–1, 5–2, 6–0			Kazan; Attendance: 235; Referees: Anne Grandin (FRA), Cory Williams (NZL)
5 August 2015; 10:50	Report	M. Eggens 5	Goals	Mirshina 2	Kazan; Attendance: 235; Referees: Anne Grandin (FRA), Cory Williams (NZL)
