= Kazakhstan at the 2017 World Aquatics Championships =

- Flag of Kazakhstan
- World Aquatics code: KAZ
- National federation: Swimming Federation of the Republic of Kazakhstan
- Website: www.aquatics.kz/en

in Budapest, Hungary
- Competitors: 46 in 4 sports
- Medals: Gold 0 Silver 0 Bronze 0 Total 0

World Aquatics Championships appearances
- 1994; 1998; 2001; 2003; 2005; 2007; 2009; 2011; 2013; 2015; 2017; 2019; 2022; 2023; 2024; 2025

Other related appearances
- Soviet Union (1973–1991)

Kazakhstan competed at the 2017 World Aquatics Championships in Budapest, Hungary from 14 July to 30 July.

== Open water swimming ==
Kazakhstan has entered five open water swimmers

| Athlete | Event | Time | Rank |
|---|---|---|---|
| Lev Cherepanov | Men's 5 km | 1:02:30.8 | 57 |
| Kenessary Kenenbayev | Men's 10 km | 2:05:14.0 | 56 |
| Kenessary Kenenbayev | Men's 25 km | 5:49:57.5 | 25 |
| Vitaliy Khudyakov | Men's 5 km | 54:48.1 | 9 |
| Vitaliy Khudyakov | Men's 10 km | 1:52:30.8 | 15 |
| Vitaliy Khudyakov | Men's 25 km | 5:04:36.1 | 7 |
| Nina Rakhimova | Women's 5 km | 1:09:28.7 | 54 |
| Xeniya Romanchuk | Women's 5 km | 1:02:00.3 | 30 |
| Xeniya Romanchuk | Women's 10 km | 2:11:34.4 | 44 |
| Xeniya Romanchuk | Women's 25 km | 5:45:56.7 | 18 |
| Nina Rakhimova; Xeniya Romanchuk; Lev Cherepanov; Kenessary Kenenbayev | Mixed team | 1:00:59.3 | 18 |

== Swimming ==
Kazakh swimmers have achieved qualifying standards in the following events (up to a maximum of 2 swimmers in each event at the A-standard entry time, and 1 at the B-standard):

| Athlete | Event | Heat | | Semifinal | | Final | |
| Athlete | Event | Time | Rank | Time | Rank | Time | Rank |
|---|---|---|---|---|---|---|---|
| Dmitriy Balandin | Men's 50 m breaststroke | 27.74 | 26 | did not advance | | | |
| Dmitriy Balandin | Men's 100 m breaststroke | 1:00.25 | 21 | did not advance | | | |
| Dmitriy Balandin | Men's 200 m breaststroke | 2:10.18 | 10 Q | 2:09.69 | 13 | did not advance | |
| Adil Kaskabay | Men's 100 m freestyle | 49.81 | 41 | did not advance | | | |
| Adil Kaskabay | Men's 200 m backstroke | 2:03.09 | 34 | did not advance | | | |
| Adilbek Mussin | Men's 50 m butterfly | 24.13 | 31 | did not advance | | | |
| Adilbek Mussin | Men's 100 m butterfly | 53.37 | 37 | did not advance | | | |
| Yekaterina Rudenko | Women's 50 m backstroke | 29.51 | 41 | did not advance | | | |
| Yekaterina Rudenko | Women's 100 m backstroke | 1:02.51 | 35 | did not advance | | | |

== Synchronized swimming ==
Kazakhstan's synchronized swimming team consisted of 11 athletes (11 female).

Women

| Athlete | Event | Preliminaries | | Final | |
| Athlete | Event | Points | Rank | Points | Rank |
|---|---|---|---|---|---|
| Alexandra Nemich; Yekaterina Nemich | Duet technical routine | 83.2379 | 13 | did not advance | |
| Alexandra Nemich; Yekaterina Nemich | Duet free routine | 84.2000 | 12 Q | 83.9000 | 12 |
| Yana Degtyareva; Lika Gulyomina (R); Renata Konovalenko; Yelena Krylova; Alina Matkova; Alexandra Nemich (R); Yekaterina Simonova; Daniya Talgatova; Kristina Tynybayeva; Olga Yezdakova | Team free routine | 80.6667 | 15 | did not advance | |
| Yana Degtyareva; Lika Gulyomina (R); Renata Konovalenko; Yelena Krylova; Alina Matkova; Alexandra Nemich; Yekaterina Nemich; Yekaterina Simonova; Daniya Talgatova; Kristina Tynybayeva; Olga Yezdakova | Free routine combination | 81.0333 | 12 Q | 82.0000 | 12 |

Legend: (R) = Reserve Athlete

== Water polo ==
Kazakhstan qualified both a men's and women's teams.

=== Men's tournament ===
Team roster

- Madikhan Makhmetov
- Yevgeniy Medvedev (C)
- Stanislav Shvedov
- Roman Pilipenko
- Altay Altayev
- Alexey Shmider
- Murat Shakenov
- Yulian Verdesh
- Rustam Ukumanov
- Mikhail Ruday
- Ravil Manafov
- Bolat Turlykhanov
- Valeriy Shlemov

Group play

| Pos | Team | Pld | W | D | L | GF | GA | GD | Pts | Qualification |
|---|---|---|---|---|---|---|---|---|---|---|
| 1 | Montenegro | 3 | 2 | 1 | 0 | 35 | 18 | +17 | 5 | Quarterfinals |
| 2 | Brazil | 3 | 1 | 1 | 1 | 17 | 22 | −5 | 3 | Playoffs |
| 3 | Kazakhstan | 3 | 1 | 0 | 2 | 17 | 28 | −11 | 2 (Note: Kazakhstan 10–9 Canada) | Playoffs |
| 4 | Canada | 3 | 0 | 2 | 1 | 23 | 24 | −1 | 2 | |

Source: Sportresult
Rules for classification: 1) points; 2) head-to-head points; 3) head-to-head goal difference; 4) head-to-head number of goals scored; 5) better result against higher placed team.
Notes:

| 17 July 2017; 09:30 | Report | Brazil | 6–2 | Kazakhstan | Alfréd Hajós National Swimming Stadium, Budapest; Referees: Matan Schwartz (ISR), Yosuke Kajiwara (JPN) |
| 17 July 2017; 09:30 | Report | Score by quarters: 1–1, 0–1, 3–0, 2–0 | | | Alfréd Hajós National Swimming Stadium, Budapest; Referees: Matan Schwartz (ISR), Yosuke Kajiwara (JPN) |
| 17 July 2017; 09:30 | Report | G. Guimarães 4 | Goals | Turlykhanov, Ukumanov 1 | Alfréd Hajós National Swimming Stadium, Budapest; Referees: Matan Schwartz (ISR), Yosuke Kajiwara (JPN) |

| 19 July 2017; 18:30 | Report | Canada | 9–10 | Kazakhstan | Alfréd Hajós National Swimming Stadium, Budapest; Referees: Georgios Stavridis (GRE), Nader Ghafouri (IRI) |
| 19 July 2017; 18:30 | Report | Score by quarters: 2–2, 3–3, 3–2, 1–3 | | | Alfréd Hajós National Swimming Stadium, Budapest; Referees: Georgios Stavridis (GRE), Nader Ghafouri (IRI) |
| 19 July 2017; 18:30 | Report | Thumwood 4 | Goals | Medvedev, Ukumanov 4 | Alfréd Hajós National Swimming Stadium, Budapest; Referees: Georgios Stavridis (GRE), Nader Ghafouri (IRI) |

| 21 July 2017; 18:05 | Report | Montenegro | 13–5 | Kazakhstan | Alfréd Hajós National Swimming Stadium, Budapest; Referees: Georgios Stavridis (GRE), Steven Rotstart (USA) |
| 21 July 2017; 18:05 | Report | Score by quarters: 2–0, 4–0, 3–2, 4–3 | | | Alfréd Hajós National Swimming Stadium, Budapest; Referees: Georgios Stavridis (GRE), Steven Rotstart (USA) |
| 21 July 2017; 18:05 | Report | Čučković 4 | Goals | Ukumanov 2 | Alfréd Hajós National Swimming Stadium, Budapest; Referees: Georgios Stavridis (GRE), Steven Rotstart (USA) |

Playoffs

| 23 July 2017; 15:00 | Report | Kazakhstan | 7–12 | Italy | Alfréd Hajós National Swimming Stadium, Budapest; Referees: Péter Molnár (HUN), Nader Ghafouri (IRI) |
| 23 July 2017; 15:00 | Report | Score by quarters: 1–3, 1–2, 1–4, 4–3 | | | Alfréd Hajós National Swimming Stadium, Budapest; Referees: Péter Molnár (HUN), Nader Ghafouri (IRI) |
| 23 July 2017; 15:00 | Report | Shakenov 3 | Goals | Mirarchi, Renzuto 3 | Alfréd Hajós National Swimming Stadium, Budapest; Referees: Péter Molnár (HUN), Nader Ghafouri (IRI) |

9th–12th place semifinals

| 25 July 2017; 13:30 | Report | Kazakhstan | 6–18 | Spain | Alfréd Hajós National Swimming Stadium, Budapest; Referees: Mikhail Dykman (CAN), Stanko Ivanovski (MNE) |
| 25 July 2017; 13:30 | Report | Score by quarters: 0–4, 1–5, 1–3, 4–6 | | | Alfréd Hajós National Swimming Stadium, Budapest; Referees: Mikhail Dykman (CAN), Stanko Ivanovski (MNE) |
| 25 July 2017; 13:30 | Report | Shakenov 4 | Goals | Barroso 5 | Alfréd Hajós National Swimming Stadium, Budapest; Referees: Mikhail Dykman (CAN), Stanko Ivanovski (MNE) |

Eleventh place game

| 27 July 2017; 10:30 | Report | Brazil | 5–9 | Kazakhstan | Alfréd Hajós National Swimming Stadium, Budapest; Referees: Andrej Franulović (CRO), Nader Ghafouri (IRI) |
| 27 July 2017; 10:30 | Report | Score by quarters: 1–4, 2–2, 0–1, 2–2 | | | Alfréd Hajós National Swimming Stadium, Budapest; Referees: Andrej Franulović (CRO), Nader Ghafouri (IRI) |
| 27 July 2017; 10:30 | Report | Coutinho 2 | Goals | Shakenov, Ukumanov 2 | Alfréd Hajós National Swimming Stadium, Budapest; Referees: Andrej Franulović (CRO), Nader Ghafouri (IRI) |

=== Women's tournament ===
Team roster

- Alexandra Zharkimbayeva
- Sivilya Raiter
- Aizhan Akilbayeva
- Anna Turova
- Kamila Zakirova
- Darya Roga
- Anna Novikova
- Oxana Saichuk
- Anastassiya Yeremina
- Zamira Myrzabekova
- Anastassiya Mirshina
- Assem Mussarova (C)
- Azhar Alibayeva

Group play

| Pos | Team | Pld | W | D | L | GF | GA | GD | Pts | Qualification |
|---|---|---|---|---|---|---|---|---|---|---|
| 1 | Greece | 3 | 2 | 0 | 1 | 37 | 22 | +15 | 4 (Note: Greece 2 Pts, +1 GD; Australia 2 Pts, 0 GD; Russia 2 Pts, −1 GD) | Quarterfinals |
| 2 | Australia | 3 | 2 | 0 | 1 | 32 | 20 | +12 | 4 | Playoffs |
| 3 | Russia | 3 | 2 | 0 | 1 | 29 | 21 | +8 | 4 | Playoffs |
| 4 | Kazakhstan | 3 | 0 | 0 | 3 | 15 | 50 | −35 | 0 | |

Source: Sportresult
Rules for classification: 1) points; 2) head-to-head points; 3) head-to-head goal difference; 4) head-to-head number of goals scored; 5) Goal difference.
Notes:

| 16 July 2017; 18:50 | Report | Australia | 16–4 | Kazakhstan | Alfréd Hajós National Swimming Stadium, Budapest; Referees: Mikhail Dykman (CAN), Dion Willis (RSA) |
| 16 July 2017; 18:50 | Report | Score by quarters: 4–1, 4–1, 4–2, 4–0 | | | Alfréd Hajós National Swimming Stadium, Budapest; Referees: Mikhail Dykman (CAN), Dion Willis (RSA) |
| 16 July 2017; 18:50 | Report | Webster 5 | Goals | Zakirova 2 | Alfréd Hajós National Swimming Stadium, Budapest; Referees: Mikhail Dykman (CAN), Dion Willis (RSA) |

| 18 July 2017; 13:30 | Report | Greece | 19–5 | Kazakhstan | Alfréd Hajós National Swimming Stadium, Budapest; Referees: Daniel Daners (URU), Stanko Ivanovski (MNE) |
| 18 July 2017; 13:30 | Report | Score by quarters: 5–0, 4–2, 4–1, 6–2 | | | Alfréd Hajós National Swimming Stadium, Budapest; Referees: Daniel Daners (URU), Stanko Ivanovski (MNE) |
| 18 July 2017; 13:30 | Report | Asimaki 4 | Goals | Akilbayeva 3 | Alfréd Hajós National Swimming Stadium, Budapest; Referees: Daniel Daners (URU), Stanko Ivanovski (MNE) |

| 20 July 2017; 12:10 | Report | Russia | 15–6 | Kazakhstan | Alfréd Hajós National Swimming Stadium, Budapest; Referees: Natacha Florestano (BRA), Mikhail Dykman (CAN) |
| 20 July 2017; 12:10 | Report | Score by quarters: 5–1, 3–2, 4–2, 3–1 | | | Alfréd Hajós National Swimming Stadium, Budapest; Referees: Natacha Florestano (BRA), Mikhail Dykman (CAN) |
| 20 July 2017; 12:10 | Report | Simanovich 3 | Goals | Mirshina 3 | Alfréd Hajós National Swimming Stadium, Budapest; Referees: Natacha Florestano (BRA), Mikhail Dykman (CAN) |

13th–16th place semifinals

| 22 July 2017; 12:00 | Report | Japan | 17–8 | Kazakhstan | Alfréd Hajós National Swimming Stadium, Budapest; Referees: Diego Garibaldi (ARG), Michael Brooks (NZL) |
| 22 July 2017; 12:00 | Report | Score by quarters: 3–1, 2–1, 7–4, 5–2 | | | Alfréd Hajós National Swimming Stadium, Budapest; Referees: Diego Garibaldi (ARG), Michael Brooks (NZL) |
| 22 July 2017; 12:00 | Report | Arima, Sakanoue 4 | Goals | Mirshina 4 | Alfréd Hajós National Swimming Stadium, Budapest; Referees: Diego Garibaldi (ARG), Michael Brooks (NZL) |

15th place game

| 24 July 2017; 09:30 | Report | South Africa | 4–6 | Kazakhstan | Alfréd Hajós National Swimming Stadium, Budapest; Referees: Ni Shiwei (CHN), Benjamin Mercier (FRA) |
| 24 July 2017; 09:30 | Report | Score by quarters: 1–2, 2–2, 1–0, 0–2 | | | Alfréd Hajós National Swimming Stadium, Budapest; Referees: Ni Shiwei (CHN), Benjamin Mercier (FRA) |
| 24 July 2017; 09:30 | Report | Smit 2 | Goals | Akilbayeva 2 | Alfréd Hajós National Swimming Stadium, Budapest; Referees: Ni Shiwei (CHN), Benjamin Mercier (FRA) |
