= Kazakhstan at the 2019 World Aquatics Championships =

- Flag of Kazakhstan
- FINA code: KAZ
- National federation: Swimming Federation of the Republic of Kazakhstan
- Website: aquatics.kz (in Russian)

in Gwangju, South Korea
- Medals: Gold 0 Silver 0 Bronze 0 Total 0

World Aquatics Championships appearances
- 1994; 1998; 2001; 2003; 2005; 2007; 2009; 2011; 2013; 2015; 2017; 2019; 2022; 2023; 2024

Other related appearances
- Soviet Union (1973–1991)

Kazakhstan competed at the 2019 World Aquatics Championships in Gwangju, South Korea from 12 to 28 July.

== Artistic swimming ==
Kazakhstan entered 14 artistic swimmers.

Women

Athlete	Event	Preliminaries		Final	
Athlete	Event	Points	Rank	Points	Rank
Alexandra Nemich; Yekaterina Nemich	Duet technical routine	82.4232	15	did not advance	
Alexandra Nemich; Yekaterina Nemich	Duet free routine	83.1000	15	did not advance	
Karina Abdulina; Nargiza Bolatova; Eteri Kakutia; Yelena Krylova; Aigerim Kurmangaliyeva; Yekaterina Simonova; Olga Yezdakova; Zhaniya Zhiyengazy; Xeniya Makarova (R); Jennifer Russanova (R)	Team free routine	80.5667	15	did not advance	
Karina Abdulina; Nargiza Bolatova; Eteri Kakutia; Yelena Krylova; Aigerim Kurmangaliyeva; Xeniya Makarova; Jennifer Russanova; Yekaterina Simonova; Olga Yezdakova; Zhaniya Zhiyengazy	Free routine combination	81.6667	9 Q	82.0000	10

Mixed

Athlete	Event	Preliminaries		Final	
Athlete	Event	Points	Rank	Points	Rank
Aigerim Issayeva; Olzhas Makhanbetiyarov	Duet technical routine	71.7055	9 Q	72.2398	9

Legend: (R) = Reserve Athlete

== Open water swimming ==
Kazakhstan qualified three male and one female open water swimmers.

Men

Athlete	Event	Time	Rank
Lev Cherepanov	Men's 10 km	1:58:04.4	60
Lev Cherepanov	Men's 25 km	5:22:47.4	21
Kenessary Kenenbayev	Men's 5 km	1:04:41.7	59
Vitaliy Khudyakov	Men's 5 km	53:48.3	31
Vitaliy Khudyakov	Men's 25 km	4:58:33.0	16

Women

Athlete	Event	Time	Rank
Mariya Fedotova	Women's 5 km	1:06:24.0	49
Mariya Fedotova	Women's 10 km	2:07:42.5	51

== Swimming ==
Kazakhstan entered seven swimmers.

Men

Athlete	Event	Heat		Semifinal		Final	
Athlete	Event	Time	Rank	Time	Rank	Time	Rank
Dmitriy Balandin	50 m breaststroke	27.36	17	did not advance			
Dmitriy Balandin	100 m breaststroke	59.56	13 Q	59.03	6 Q	59.14	7
Dmitriy Balandin	200 m breaststroke	2:09.72	11 Q	2:08.19	7 Q	2:08.25	7
Adil Kaskabay	100 m freestyle	50.34	50	did not advance			
Adil Kaskabay	100 m backstroke	55.89	40	did not advance			
Adilbek Mussin	50 m butterfly	23.64	17	did not advance			
Adilbek Mussin	100 m butterfly	52.46	17	did not advance			
Adilbek Mussin	200 m butterfly	1:58.58	25	did not advance			
Alexandr Varakin	50 m freestyle	22.72	43	did not advance			
Adil Kaskabay; Dmitriy Balandin; Adilbek Mussin; Alexandr Varakin	4×100 m medley relay	3:38.13	22	—		did not advance	

Women

Athlete	Event	Heat		Semifinal		Final	
Athlete	Event	Time	Rank	Time	Rank	Time	Rank
Diana Nazarova	50 m backstroke	29.51	27	did not advance			
Diana Nazarova	100 m backstroke	1:04.22	47	did not advance			
Adelaida Pchelintseva	50 m breaststroke	31.94	26	did not advance			
Adelaida Pchelintseva	100 m breaststroke	1:13.24	40	did not advance			
Diana Zlobina	400 m freestyle	4:35.38	38	—		did not advance	
Diana Zlobina	800 m freestyle	9:31.05	40	—		did not advance	

== Water polo ==
=== Men's tournament ===
Team roster

- Pavel Lipilin
- Yevgeniy Medvedev
- Maxim Zhardan
- Roman Pilipenko
- Miras Aubakirov
- Altay Altayev
- Murat Shakenov (C)
- Yegor Berbelyuk
- Stanislav Shvedov
- Mikhail Ruday
- Ravil Manafov
- Yulian Verdesh
- Valeriy Shlemov
- Coach: Dejan Stanojević

Group B

Pos	Team	Pld	W	D	L	GF	GA	GD	Pts	Qualification
1	Croatia	3	3	0	0	52	16	+36	6	Quarterfinals
2	United States	3	2	0	1	35	35	0	4	Playoffs
3	Australia	3	1	0	2	32	34	−2	2	Playoffs
4	Kazakhstan	3	0	0	3	20	54	−34	0	

Source: Sportresult
Rules for classification: 1) points; 2) head-to-head points; 3) head-to-head goal difference; 4) head-to-head number of goals scored; 5) Goal difference.

15 July 2019; 11:10	Report	United States	16–7	Kazakhstan	Nambu University Aquatics Center, Gwangju; Referees: Boris Margeta (SLO), Georgios Stavridis (GRE)
15 July 2019; 11:10	Report	Score by quarters: 4–1, 4–2, 3–2, 5–2			Nambu University Aquatics Center, Gwangju; Referees: Boris Margeta (SLO), Georgios Stavridis (GRE)
15 July 2019; 11:10	Report	four players 3	Goals	seven players 1	Nambu University Aquatics Center, Gwangju; Referees: Boris Margeta (SLO), Georgios Stavridis (GRE)

17 July 2019; 08:30	Report	Australia	17–8	Kazakhstan	Nambu University Aquatics Center, Gwangju; Referees: Germán Moller (ARG), Dion Willis (RSA)
17 July 2019; 08:30	Report	Score by quarters: 4–1, 5–1, 3–4, 5–2			Nambu University Aquatics Center, Gwangju; Referees: Germán Moller (ARG), Dion Willis (RSA)
17 July 2019; 08:30	Report	Howden 4	Goals	Zhardan 3	Nambu University Aquatics Center, Gwangju; Referees: Germán Moller (ARG), Dion Willis (RSA)

19 July 2019; 20:30	Report	Croatia	21–5	Kazakhstan	Nambu University Aquatics Center, Gwangju; Referees: Sebastien Dervieux (FRA), Michiel Zwart (NED)
19 July 2019; 20:30	Report	Score by quarters: 6–1, 5–1, 5–1, 5–2			Nambu University Aquatics Center, Gwangju; Referees: Sebastien Dervieux (FRA), Michiel Zwart (NED)
19 July 2019; 20:30	Report	Joković, Šetka 3	Goals	five players 1	Nambu University Aquatics Center, Gwangju; Referees: Sebastien Dervieux (FRA), Michiel Zwart (NED)

13th–16th place semifinals

21 July 2019; 10:30	Report	South Korea	4–17	Kazakhstan	Nambu University Aquatics Center, Gwangju; Referees: Daniel Flahive (AUS), Vojin Putniković (SRB)
21 July 2019; 10:30	Report	Score by quarters: 1–4, 2–4, 0–7, 1–2			Nambu University Aquatics Center, Gwangju; Referees: Daniel Flahive (AUS), Vojin Putniković (SRB)
21 July 2019; 10:30	Report	four players 1	Goals	Aubakirov 4	Nambu University Aquatics Center, Gwangju; Referees: Daniel Flahive (AUS), Vojin Putniković (SRB)

13th place game

23 July 2019; 09:30	Report	Kazakhstan	8–9	Brazil	Nambu University Aquatics Center, Gwangju; Referees: Nenad Peris (CRO), Frank Ohme (GER)
23 July 2019; 09:30	Report	Score by quarters: 3–3, 2–2, 1–2, 2–2			Nambu University Aquatics Center, Gwangju; Referees: Nenad Peris (CRO), Frank Ohme (GER)
23 July 2019; 09:30	Report	three players 2	Goals	Real 3	Nambu University Aquatics Center, Gwangju; Referees: Nenad Peris (CRO), Frank Ohme (GER)

=== Women's tournament ===
Team roster

- Alexandra Zharkimbayeva (C)
- Tomiris Kenenbayeva
- Aizhan Akilbayeva
- Anna Turova
- Kamila Zakirova
- Darya Roga
- Anna Novikova
- Darya Muravyeva
- Anastassiya Yeremina
- Zamira Myrzabekova
- Anastasiya Mirshina
- Viktoriya Khritankova
- Azhar Alibayeva
- Coach: Marat Naurazbekov

Group C

Pos	Team	Pld	W	D	L	GF	GA	GD	Pts	Qualification
1	Spain	3	3	0	0	51	16	+35	6	Quarterfinals
2	Greece	3	2	0	1	37	25	+12	4	Playoffs
3	Kazakhstan	3	1	0	2	22	37	−15	2	Playoffs
4	Cuba	3	0	0	3	16	48	−32	0	

Source: Sportresult
Rules for classification: 1) points; 2) head-to-head points; 3) head-to-head goal difference; 4) head-to-head number of goals scored; 5) Goal difference.

14 July 2019; 16:30	Report	Cuba	6–9	Kazakhstan	Nambu University Aquatics Center, Gwangju; Referees: Adrian Alexandrescu (ROU), Dion Willis (RSA)
14 July 2019; 16:30	Report	Score by quarters: 0–1, 3–1, 2–4, 1–3			Nambu University Aquatics Center, Gwangju; Referees: Adrian Alexandrescu (ROU), Dion Willis (RSA)
14 July 2019; 16:30	Report	Chávez 2	Goals	Myrzabekova 3	Nambu University Aquatics Center, Gwangju; Referees: Adrian Alexandrescu (ROU), Dion Willis (RSA)

16 July 2019; 11:10	Report	Spain	18–6	Kazakhstan	Nambu University Aquatics Center, Gwangju; Referees: Germán Moller (ARG), Michiel Zwart (NED)
16 July 2019; 11:10	Report	Score by quarters: 3–1, 7–3, 3–1, 5–1			Nambu University Aquatics Center, Gwangju; Referees: Germán Moller (ARG), Michiel Zwart (NED)
16 July 2019; 11:10	Report	three players 3	Goals	Mirshina, Yeremina 2	Nambu University Aquatics Center, Gwangju; Referees: Germán Moller (ARG), Michiel Zwart (NED)

18 July 2019; 09:50	Report	Greece	13–7	Kazakhstan	Nambu University Aquatics Center, Gwangju; Referees: Sebastien Dervieux (FRA), Adrian Alexandrescu (ROU)
18 July 2019; 09:50	Report	Score by quarters: 4–1, 4–1, 1–3, 4–2			Nambu University Aquatics Center, Gwangju; Referees: Sebastien Dervieux (FRA), Adrian Alexandrescu (ROU)
18 July 2019; 09:50	Report	Xenaki 3	Goals	Zakirova 3	Nambu University Aquatics Center, Gwangju; Referees: Sebastien Dervieux (FRA), Adrian Alexandrescu (ROU)

Playoffs

20 July 2019; 18:30	Report	Kazakhstan	3–13	Australia	Nambu University Aquatics Center, Gwangju; Referees: Vojin Putniković (SRB), Marie-Claude Deslieres (CAN)
20 July 2019; 18:30	Report	Score by quarters: 0–4, 1–2, 2–3, 0–4			Nambu University Aquatics Center, Gwangju; Referees: Vojin Putniković (SRB), Marie-Claude Deslieres (CAN)
20 July 2019; 18:30	Report	Myrzabekova 2	Goals	Halligan 4	Nambu University Aquatics Center, Gwangju; Referees: Vojin Putniković (SRB), Marie-Claude Deslieres (CAN)

9th–12th place semifinals

22 July 2019; 12:30	Report	New Zealand	12–14	Kazakhstan	Nambu University Aquatics Center, Gwangju; Referees: Dion Willis (RSA), Georgios Stavridis (GRE)
22 July 2019; 12:30	Report	Score by quarters: 3–6, 3–2, 2–0, 2–2 PSO: 2–4			Nambu University Aquatics Center, Gwangju; Referees: Dion Willis (RSA), Georgios Stavridis (GRE)
22 July 2019; 12:30	Report	Doyle 4	Goals	Mirshina 4	Nambu University Aquatics Center, Gwangju; Referees: Dion Willis (RSA), Georgios Stavridis (GRE)

Ninth place game

24 July 2019; 11:00	Report	Canada	24–7	Kazakhstan	Nambu University Aquatics Center, Gwangju; Referees: Sebastien Dervieux (FRA), Dion Willis (RSA)
24 July 2019; 11:00	Report	Score by quarters: 7–3, 5–1, 4–1, 8–2			Nambu University Aquatics Center, Gwangju; Referees: Sebastien Dervieux (FRA), Dion Willis (RSA)
24 July 2019; 11:00	Report	Békhazi 5	Goals	Roga, Mirshina 2	Nambu University Aquatics Center, Gwangju; Referees: Sebastien Dervieux (FRA), Dion Willis (RSA)
