= Synchronized swimming at the 2016 Summer Olympics – Women's team =

Women's Team at the Games of the XXXI Olympiad
- Venue: Maria Lenk Aquatic Center, Olympic Aquatics Stadium
- Dates: 18–19 August 2016
- Competitors: 64 from 8 nations
- Teams: 8
- Winning score: 196.1439 points

Medalists
1st place, gold medalist(s)		Vlada Chigireva, Natalia Ishchenko, Svetlana Kolesnichenko, Aleksandra Patskevich, Svetlana Romashina, Alla Shishkina, Maria Shurochkina, Gelena Topilina, Elena Prokofyeva	Russia
2nd place, silver medalist(s)		Gu Xiao, Guo Li, Li Xiaolu, Liang Xinping, Sun Wenyan, Tang Mengni, Yin Chengxin, Zeng Zhen, Huang Xuechen	China
3rd place, bronze medalist(s)		Aika Hakoyama, Yukiko Inui, Kei Marumo, Risako Mitsui, Kanami Nakamaki, Mai Nakamura, Kano Omata, Kurumi Yoshida, Aiko Hayashi	Japan

The Women's team event at the 2016 Summer Olympics in Rio de Janeiro, Brazil, took place at the Maria Lenk Aquatics Center from 14 to 16 August.

Eight teams competed, each consisting of eight swimmers (from a total team of nine swimmers). There was a single round of competition. Each team presented two routines: a technical routine and a free routine. The technical routine consisted of twelve required elements, which had to be completed in order between a time of 2 minutes 35 seconds and 3 minutes 5 seconds. The free routine has no restrictions other than time; this routine was required to last between 3 minutes 45 seconds and 4 minutes 15 seconds.

For each routine, teams were judged by two panels of five judges each. One panel was the technical jury, the other was the artistic jury. Each judge gave marks between 0 and 10. The highest and lowest score from each panel were dropped, leaving a total of six scores which were then summed to give the routine's score. The scores of the two routines were then added to give a final score for the team.

The medals for the event were presented by Stefan Holm, Nicole Hoevertsz and Alexander Zhukov, IOC members from Sweden, Aruba and Russia respectively, and by Qiuping Zhang, Margo Mountjoy and Vladimir Salnikov, Bureau Members of FINA.

== Schedule ==
All times are UTC−03:00

Date	Time	Round
Thursday, 18 August 2016	13:00	Final technical routine
Friday, 19 August 2016	12:00	Final free routine

== Results ==
Rank	Country	Athletes	Technical	Free	Total
1st place, gold medalist(s)	Russia	Vlada Chigireva, Natalia Ishchenko, Svetlana Kolesnichenko, Aleksandra Patskevich, Svetlana Romashina, Alla Shishkina, Mariia Shurochkina, Gelena Topilina, Elena Prokofyeva	97.0106	99.1333	196.1439
2nd place, silver medalist(s)	China	Gu Xiao, Guo Li, Li Xiaolu, Liang Xinping, Sun Wenyan, Tang Mengni, Yin Chengxin, Zeng Zhen, Huang Xuechen	95.6174	97.3667	192.9841
3rd place, bronze medalist(s)	Japan	Aika Hakoyama, Yukiko Inui, Kei Marumo, Risako Mitsui, Kanami Nakamaki, Mai Nakamura, Kano Omata, Kurumi Yoshida, Aiko Hayashi	93.7723	95.4333	189.2056
4	Ukraine	Lolita Ananasova, Olena Grechykhina, Daria Iushko, Oleksandra Sabada, Kateryna Sadurska, Kseniya Sydorenko, Anastasiya Savchuk, Anna Voloshyna, Olha Zolotarova	93.4413	95.1667	188.6080
5	Italy	Elisa Bozzo, Beatrice Callegari, Camilla Cattaneo, Linda Cerruti, Manila Flamini, Francesca Deidda, Mariangela Perrupato, Sara Sgarzi, Costanza Ferro	91.1142	92.2667	183.3809
6	Brazil	Luisa Borges, Maria Bruno, Beatriz Feres, Branca Feres, Maria Clara Lobo, Maria Eduarda Miccuci, Lorena Molinos, Lara Teixeira, Pâmela Nogueira	84.7985	87.2000	171.9985
7	Egypt	Leila Abdelmoez, Samia Ahmed, Nariman Aly, Nour Elayoubi, Jomana Elmaghrabi, Dara Hassanien, Salma Negmeldin, Nada Saafan, Nehal Saafan	76.9838	78.5667	155.5505
8	Australia	Bianca Hammett, Danielle Kettlewell, Nikita Pablo, Emily Rogers, Cristina Sheehan, Rose Stackpole, Amie Thompson, Deborah Tsai, Hannah Cross	74.0667	75.4333	149.5000
