= Synchronised swimming at the 2015 World Aquatics Championships – Team free routine =

Team free routine at the 2015 World Aquatics Championships
- Dates: 28–31 July
- Competitors: 168 from 21 nations
- Winning points: 98.4667

Medalists
gold medal	Vlada Chigireva; Svetlana Kolesnichenko; Alexandra Patskevich; Elena Prokofyeva; Alla Shishkina; Maria Shurochkina; Angelika Timanina; Gelena Topilina; Liliia Nizamova (reserve); Darina Valitova (reserve)	Russia
silver medal	Gu Xiao; Guo Li; Li Xiaolu; Liang Xinping; Sun Wenyan; Tang Mengni; Yin Chengxin; Zeng Zhen; Huang Xuechen (reserve); Xiao Yanning (reserve)	China
bronze medal	Aika Hakoyama; Aiko Hayashi; Yukiko Inui; Kei Marumo; Risako Mitsui; Kanami Nakamaki; Mai Nakamura; Kurumi Yoshida; Kano Omata (reserve); Asuka Tasaki (reserve)	Japan

The Team free routine competition of the synchronised swimming events at the 2015 World Aquatics Championships was held on 28 and 31 July 2015.

== Results ==
The preliminary round was held on 28 July at 17:30. The final was held on 31 July at 17:30.

Green denotes finalists

Rank	Nation	Preliminary		Final	
Rank	Nation	Points	Rank	Points	Rank
1st place, gold medalist(s)	Russia	97.6333	1	98.4667	1
2nd place, silver medalist(s)	China	95.5000	2	96.1333	2
3rd place, bronze medalist(s)	Japan	93.7000	3	93.9000	3
4	Ukraine	92.7333	4	93.7000	4
5	Spain	91.9000	5	92.4667	5
6	Italy	90.7667	6	91.4667	6
7	Canada	89.8000	7	90.0000	7
8	Mexico	87.5000	8	87.6333	8
9	France	86.5667	9	87.3333	9
10	Greece	85.5667	10	85.8333	10
11	Brazil	85.3333	11	85.2667	11
12	United States	84.6333	12	84.5667	12
13	Belarus	81.6000	13		
14	Switzerland	79.6667	14		
15	Egypt	77.7000	15		
16	Australia	75.1000	16		
17	New Zealand	72.5667	17		
18	Venezuela	72.2333	18		
19	Costa Rica	71.8000	19		
20	Macau	70.0000	20		
21	Hong Kong	67.0667	21		
