= Nemich =

Nemich (/ˈniːmɪtʃ/ NEE-mitch) is a surname. Notable people with the surname are:

- Alexandra Nemich (born 1995), Kazakhstani synchronized swimmer and sister of Yekaterina Nemich
- Yekaterina Nemich (born 1995), Kazakhstani synchronized swimmer and sister of Alexandra Nemich
