= Synchronized swimming at the 2014 Asian Games – Women's duet =

Women's duet at the 2014 Asian Games
- Venue: Munhak Park Tae-hwan Aquatics Center
- Date: 20 September 2014
- Competitors: 26 from 9 nations

Medalists
gold medal	China; Huang Xuechen, Sun Wenyan, Sun Yijing
silver medal	Japan; Yukiko Inui, Hikaru Kazumori, Risako Mitsui
bronze medal	Kazakhstan; Alexandra Nemich, Yekaterina Nemich, Amina Yermakhanova

The women's duet synchronized swimming competition at the 2014 Asian Games in Incheon was held on 20 September at the Munhak Park Tae-hwan Aquatics Center.

== Schedule ==
All times are Korea Standard Time (UTC+09:00)

Date	Time	Event
Saturday, 20 September 2014	10:00	Technical routine
Saturday, 20 September 2014	15:00	Free routine

== Results ==
Legend

- FR — Reserve in free
- RR — Reserve in technical and free
- TR — Reserve in technical

Rank	Team	Technical	Free	Total
1st place, gold medalist(s)	China (CHN); Huang Xuechen; Sun Wenyan; Sun Yijing (RR)	91.1851	94.0000	185.1851
2nd place, silver medalist(s)	Japan (JPN); Yukiko Inui; Hikaru Kazumori (RR); Risako Mitsui	89.6721	91.8667	181.5388
3rd place, bronze medalist(s)	Kazakhstan (KAZ); Alexandra Nemich; Yekaterina Nemich; Amina Yermakhanova (RR)	82.4306	85.3333	167.7639
4	North Korea (PRK); Kim Jin-gyong (RR); Kim Jong-hui; Ri Ji-hyang	82.1401	83.6333	165.7734
5	Uzbekistan (UZB); Yuliya Kim; Anastasiya Ruzmetova; Anastasiya Zdraykovskaya (RR)	74.8379	76.9000	151.7379
6	South Korea (KOR); Gu Seul; Kim Ka-young	73.6881	75.4000	149.0881
7	Malaysia (MAS); Katrina Abdul Hadi; Zylane Lee; Tasha Jane Taher Ali (RR)	73.4241	74.8333	148.2574
8	Macau (MAC); Au Ieong Sin Ieng; Kou Chin (RR); Lo Wai Lam	66.5981	69.5667	136.1648
9	Hong Kong (HKG); Nora Cho; Michelle Lau (FR); Pang Ho Yan (TR)	65.4238	68.1333	133.5571
