= Synchronised swimming at the 2015 World Aquatics Championships – Free routine combination =

Free routine combination at the 2015 World Aquatics Championships
- Dates: 26 July–1 August
- Competitors: 160 from 16 nations

Medalists
gold medal	Vlada Chigireva; Mikhaela Kalancha; Svetlana Kolesnichenko; Liliia Nizamova; Alexandra Patskevich; Elena Prokofyeva; Alla Shishkina; Maria Shurochkina; Angelika Timanina; Gelena Topilina; Svetlana Romashina (reserve); Darina Valitova (reserve)	Russia
silver medal	Gu Xiao; Guo Li; Li Xiaolu; Liang Xinping; Sun Wenyan; Sun Yijing; Tang Mengni; Xiao Yanning; Yin Chengxin; Zeng Zhen; Huang Xuechen (reserve); Li Mo (reserve)	China
bronze medal	Aika Hakoyama; Aiko Hayashi; Yukiko Inui; Kei Marumo; Risako Mitsui; Kanami Nakamaki; Mai Nakamura; Kano Omata; Asuka Tasaki; Kurumi Yoshida	Japan

The Free routine combination competition of the synchronised swimming events at the 2015 World Aquatics Championships was held on 26 July and 1 August 2015.

== Results ==
The preliminary round was held on 26 July at 14:00. The final was held on 1 August at 17:30.

Green denotes finalists

Rank	Nation	Preliminary		Final	
Rank	Nation	Points	Rank	Points	Rank
1st place, gold medalist(s)	Russia	96.4000	1	98.3000	1
2nd place, silver medalist(s)	China	94.9333	2	96.2000	2
3rd place, bronze medalist(s)	Japan	92.6000	3	93.8000	3
4	Ukraine	92.4000	4	93.4000	4
5	Spain	91.9000	5	92.3667	5
6	Canada	89.4000	6	90.3667	6
7	Italy	88.9000	7	89.7333	7
8	Greece	86.6333	8	86.6667	8
9	Mexico	85.3333	9	86.5667	9
10	Brazil	84.1000	10	84.8000	10
11	North Korea	81.7667	12	82.6000	11
12	Belarus	81.8333	11	82.3000	12
13	Switzerland	81.6000	13		
14	Kazakhstan	80.1000	14		
15	Venezuela	75.1000	15		
16	Macau	71.1667	16		
