= Synchronized swimming at the 2014 Asian Games – Women's combination =

Women's combination at the 2014 Asian Games
- Venue: Munhak Park Tae-hwan Aquatics Center
- Dates: 23 September 2014
- Competitors: 54 from 5 nations

Medalists
gold medal	China; Chen Xiaojun, Gu Xiao, Guo Li, Huang Xuechen, Li Xiaolu, Liang Xinping, Sun Wenyan, Sun Yijing, Tang Mengni, Yin Chengxin, Yu Lele, Zeng Zhen
silver medal	Japan; Miho Arai, Aika Hakoyama, Yukiko Inui, Mayo Itoyama, Hikaru Kazumori, Kei Marumo, Risako Mitsui, Natsumi Miyazaki, Kanami Nakamaki, Mai Nakamura, Kurumi Yoshida
bronze medal	Kazakhstan; Aigerim Anarbayeva, Xeniya Kachurina, Yuliya Kempel, Alina Matkova, Aisulu Nauryzbayeva, Alexandra Nemich, Yekaterina Nemich, Daniya Talgatova, Kristina Tynybayeva, Amina Yermakhanova, Olga Yezdakova

The women's combination synchronized swimming competition at the 2014 Asian Games in Incheon was held on 23 September at the Munhak Park Tae-hwan Aquatics Center.

== Schedule ==
All times are Korea Standard Time (UTC+09:00)

Date	Time	Event
Tuesday, 23 September 2014	15:00	Final

== Results ==
Legend

- R — Reserve

Rank	Team	Score
1st place, gold medalist(s)	China (CHN); Chen Xiaojun (R); Gu Xiao; Guo Li; Huang Xuechen; Li Xiaolu (R); Liang Xinping; Sun Wenyan; Sun Yijing; Tang Mengni; Yin Chengxin; Yu Lele; Zeng Zhen	94.9667
2nd place, silver medalist(s)	Japan (JPN); Miho Arai; Aika Hakoyama; Yukiko Inui; Mayo Itoyama; Hikaru Kazumori (R); Kei Marumo; Risako Mitsui; Natsumi Miyazaki; Kanami Nakamaki; Mai Nakamura; Kurumi Yoshida	92.6000
3rd place, bronze medalist(s)	Kazakhstan (KAZ); Aigerim Anarbayeva; Xeniya Kachurina; Yuliya Kempel; Alina Matkova; Aisulu Nauryzbayeva; Alexandra Nemich; Yekaterina Nemich; Daniya Talgatova; Kristina Tynybayeva; Amina Yermakhanova; Olga Yezdakova (R)	84.6000
4	North Korea (PRK); Jong Na-ri; Jong Yon-hui; Kang Un-ha; Kim Jin-gyong; Kim Jong-hui; Kim Ju-hye; Kim U-na; Ri Il-sim; Ri Ji-hyang; Yun Yu-jong	83.2667
5	Macau (MAC); Au Ieong Sin Ieng; Chang Si Wai; Cheong Ka Ieng; Gou Cheng I Kou Chin; Lo Wai Lam; Lo Wai Si; Lok Ka Man; Wong Cheng U Wong I Teng	70.8333
