= Open water swimming at the 2015 World Aquatics Championships – Men's 10 km =

Swimming event

Men's 10 km at the 2015 World Aquatics Championships
- Dates: 27 July
- Competitors: 70 from 42 nations
- Winning time: 1:49:48.2

Medalists
gold medal	Jordan Wilimovsky	United States
silver medal	Ferry Weertman	Netherlands
bronze medal	Spyridon Gianniotis	Greece

The Men's 10 km competition of the open water swimming events at the 2015 World Aquatics Championships was held on 27 July 2015. The top ten swimmers qualified for 10 km marathon at the 2016 Summer Olympics.

== Results ==
The race was started at 12:00.

Rank	Swimmer	Nationality	Time
1st place, gold medalist(s)	Jordan Wilimovsky	United States	1:49:48.2
2nd place, silver medalist(s)	Ferry Weertman	Netherlands	1:50:00.3
3rd place, bronze medalist(s)	Spyridon Gianniotis	Greece	1:50:00.7
4	Sean Ryan	United States	1:50:03.3
5	Jack Burnell	Great Britain	1:50:05.8
6	Marc-Antoine Olivier	France	1:50:06.4
7	Simone Ruffini	Italy	1:50:09.1
8	Richard Weinberger	Canada	1:50:19.9
9	Allan do Carmo	Brazil	1:50:23.1
10	Federico Vanelli	Italy	1:50:23.1
11	Yasunari Hirai	Japan	1:50:28.3
12	Axel Reymond	France	1:50:28.4
13	Gergely Gyurta	Hungary	1:50:37.6
14	Daniel Fogg	Great Britain	1:50:39.7
15	Simon Huitenga	Australia	1:50:41.3
16	Andreas Waschburger	Germany	1:50:41.4
17	Zu Lijun	China	1:50:46.0
18	Christian Reichert	Germany	1:50:46.4
19	Chad Ho	South Africa	1:50:47.9
20	Esteban Enderica	Ecuador	1:50:48.3
21	Diogo Villarinho	Brazil	1:50:48.8
22	Mateusz Sawrymowicz	Poland	1:50:49.1
23	Oussama Mellouli	Tunisia	1:50:50.2
24	Marcel Schouten	Netherlands	1:50:52.4
25	Ihor Chervynskyi	Ukraine	1:50:57.3
26	Daniel Delgadillo	Mexico	1:51:00.8
27	Erwin Maldonado	Venezuela	1:51:19.1
28	George O'Brien	Australia	1:51:19.6
29	Antonios Fokaidis	Greece	1:51:27.3
30	Kane Radford	New Zealand	1:51:29.4
31	Guillermo Bertola	Argentina	1:51:33.6
32	Vitaliy Khudyakov	Kazakhstan	1:51:33.7
33	Kirill Abrosimov	Russia	1:51:37.1
34	Ivan Enderica Ochoa	Ecuador	1:51:54.5
35	Yohsuke Miyamoto	Japan	1:52:06.7
36	Márk Papp	Hungary	1:52:53.0
37	Ján Kútnik	Czech Republic	1:52:56.8
38	Matthias Schweinzer	Austria	1:52:57.5
39	Diego Vera	Venezuela	1:52:58.9
40	Gabriel Villagoiz	Argentina	1:53:00.6
41	Rafael Gil	Portugal	1:53:01.2
42	Shahar Resman	Israel	1:53:05.1
43	Daniil Serebrennikov	Russia	1:53:11.9
44	Christopher Bryan	Ireland	1:53:22.9
45	Qiao Zhongyi	China	1:53:38.5
46	Ventsislav Aydarski	Bulgaria	1:53:58.6
47	Antonio Arroyo	Spain	1:54:00.2
48	Arturo Pérez Vertti	Mexico	1:54:18.4
49	Youssef Hossameldeen	Egypt	1:54:22.5
50	Adel Ragab	Egypt	1:55:41.5
51	Gustavo Gutiérrez	Peru	1:56:23.1
52	Kyrylo Shvets	Ukraine	1:56:25.8
53	Shai Toledano	Israel	1:56:27.9
54	Matěj Kozubek	Czech Republic	1:56:34.2
55	Vasco Gaspar	Portugal	1:56:38.9
56	Eric Hedlin	Canada	1:56:52.3
57	Tamás Farkas	Serbia	1:58:22.1
58	Héctor Ruiz	Spain	1:58:22.2
59	Ivan Šitić	Croatia	2:00:05.7
60	Haythem Abdelkhalek	Tunisia	2:03:26.7
61	Kenessary Kenenbayev	Kazakhstan	2:05:43.6
62	Walter Caballero	Bolivia	2:08:15.3
63	Kwan Ho Yin	Hong Kong	2:10:56.5
64	Tse Tsz Fung	Hong Kong	2:11:05.9
65	Cristofer Lanuza	Costa Rica	2:12:23.3
66	Ávila Emilio	Guatemala	2:14:15.4
67	Abdulla Al-Balooshi	United Arab Emirates	2:14:43.3
68	Marek Pavúk	Slovakia	2:16:37.0
69	Mandar Divase	India	2:16:50.2
	Daniel Marais	South Africa	DNF
	Brian Ryckeman	Belgium	DNS
	Aflah Prawira	Indonesia	DNS
