= Synchronized swimming at the 2014 Asian Games – Women's team =

Women's team at the 2014 Asian Games
- Venue: Munhak Park Tae-hwan Aquatics Center
- Dates: 21–22 September 2014
- Competitors: 56 from 6 nations

Medalists
gold medal	China; Chen Xiaojun, Gu Xiao, Guo Li, Li Xiaolu, Liang Xinping, Sun Wenyan, Sun Yijing, Tang Mengni, Yu Lele, Zeng Zhen
silver medal	Japan; Miho Arai, Aika Hakoyama, Yukiko Inui, Mayo Itoyama, Hikaru Kazumori, Kei Marumo, Risako Mitsui, Kanami Nakamaki, Mai Nakamura, Kurumi Yoshida
bronze medal	North Korea; Jong Na-ri, Jong Yon-hui, Kang Un-ha, Kim Jin-gyong, Kim Jong-hui, Kim Ju-hye, Kim U-na, Ri Il-sim, Ri Ji-hyang, Yun Yu-jong

The women's team synchronized swimming competition at the 2014 Asian Games in Incheon was held on 21 and 22 September at the Munhak Park Tae-hwan Aquatics Center.

== Schedule ==
All times are Korea Standard Time (UTC+09:00)

Date	Time	Event
Sunday, 21 September 2014	15:00	Technical routine
Monday, 22 September 2014	15:00	Free routine

== Results ==
Legend

- FR — Reserve in free
- RR — Reserve in technical and free
- TR — Reserve in technical

Rank	Team	Technical	Free	Total
1st place, gold medalist(s)	China (CHN); Chen Xiaojun; Gu Xiao; Guo Li; Li Xiaolu (TR); Liang Xinping; Sun Wenyan (FR); Sun Yijing; Tang Mengni; Yu Lele (TR); Zeng Zhen (FR)	91.3888	94.3333	185.7221
2nd place, silver medalist(s)	Japan (JPN); Miho Arai (TR); Aika Hakoyama; Yukiko Inui; Mayo Itoyama (RR); Hikaru Kazumori (FR); Kei Marumo; Risako Mitsui; Kanami Nakamaki; Mai Nakamura; Kurumi Yoshida	89.6714	92.0333	181.7047
3rd place, bronze medalist(s)	North Korea (PRK); Jong Na-ri; Jong Yon-hui; Kang Un-ha; Kim Jin-gyong; Kim Jong-hui; Kim Ju-hye; Kim U-na (RR); Ri Il-sim; Ri Ji-hyang; Yun Yu-jong (RR)	83.3914	83.7333	167.1247
4	Uzbekistan (UZB); Dinara Ibragimova; Khurshida Khakimova; Mukhlisakhon Khayriddinova; Yuliya Kim; Anastasiya Ruzmetova; Nigora Shomakhsudova (RR); Gulsanam Yuldasheva; Anastasiya Zdraykovskaya; Shokhida Zokhidova	73.3761	75.2333	148.6094
5	Macau (MAC); Au Ieong Sin Ieng; Chang Si Wai; Cheong Ka Ieng (TR); Gou Cheng I Kou Chin; Lo Wai Lam; Lo Wai Si; Lok Ka Man (FR); Wong I Teng	67.2378	69.7667	137.0045
6	Hong Kong (HKG); Chan Hoi Lam; Samantha Cheung; Nora Cho; Kwok Kam Wing; Michelle Lau; Pang Ho Yan; Pang Tsz Ching; Wong Yin Ling	63.7814	67.2667	131.0481
