= Synchronized swimming at the 2016 Summer Olympics – Women's duet =

Women's Duet at the Games of the XXXI Olympiad
- Venue: Maria Lenk Aquatic Center, Olympic Aquatics Stadium
- Dates: 14−16 August
- Competitors: 48 from 24 nations
- Winning score: 194.9910 points

Medalists
| 1st place, gold medalist(s) | | Natalia Ishchenko; Svetlana Romashina | Russia |
| 2nd place, silver medalist(s) | | Huang Xuechen; Sun Wenyan | China |
| 3rd place, bronze medalist(s) | | Yukiko Inui; Risako Mitsui | Japan |

The Women's duet event at the 2016 Summer Olympics in Rio de Janeiro, Brazil, took place at the Maria Lenk Aquatics Center from 14 to 16 August.

The preliminary phase consisted of a free routine, then a technical routine with required elements. The scores from the two routines were added together and the top twelve duets qualified for the final.

The final repeated the same free routine and the score from the final free routine was added to the score from the preliminary technical routine to decide the overall winners.

The medals were presented by Nicole Hoevertsz, IOC member, Aruba and Qiuping Zhang, Bureau Member of FINA.

== Qualification ==
A total of twenty four duets qualified for the event. The eight National Olympic Committees (NOC) qualified for the team competition were automatically awarded a place for duets. The five best ranked NOCs in each of the continental championships who had not qualified for team event were also awarded a place each. The eleven remaining places were awarded through an Olympic Games qualification tournament, held in Rio at the Maria Lenk Aquatics Center 02–6 March 2016.

== Schedule ==
| Date | Round |
|---|---|
| 14 August 2016 | Preliminary Free Routine |
| 15 August 2016 | Preliminary Technical Routine |
| 16 August 2016 | Final Free Routine |

== Start list ==
Both preliminary free and technical routines starting lists were decided by random draw. For the final however, two groups were made: the last six and the first six qualified duets, the former group starting first. Within each group, the best qualified started first (meaning the seventh qualified started first and the first started seventh) with the remaining duets decided by random draw within the group.

== Results ==
=== Qualification ===
| Rank | Country | Athlete | Technical | Free | Total |
|---|---|---|---|---|---|
| 1 | Russia | Natalia Ishchenko & Svetlana Romashina | 96.4577 | 98.0667 | 194.5244 |
| 2 | China | Huang Xuechen & Sun Wenyan | 95.3688 | 96.0667 | 191.4355 |
| 3 | Japan | Yukiko Inui & Risako Mitsui | 93.1214 | 94.4000 | 187.5214 |
| 4 | Ukraine | Lolita Ananasova & Anna Voloshyna | 93.1358 | 93.5333 | 186.6691 |
| 5 | Spain | Ona Carbonell & Gemma Mengual | 92.5024 | 93.7667 | 186.2691 |
| 6 | Italy | Linda Cerruti & Costanza Ferro | 90.4412 | 91.1333 | 181.5745 |
| 7 | Canada | Jacqueline Simoneau & Karine Thomas | 89.2916 | 90.0667 | 179.3583 |
| 8 | France | Margaux Chrétien & Laura Augé | 86.2824 | 86.8667 | 173.1491 |
| 9 | United States | Anita Alvarez & Mariya Koroleva | 86.4612 | 86.4333 | 172.8945 |
| 10 | Greece | Evangelia Papazoglou & Evangelia Platanioti | 85.3550 | 86.1000 | 171.4550 |
| 11 | Mexico | Karem Achach & Nuria Diosdado | 84.9268 | 85.7333 | 170.6601 |
| 12 | Austria | Anna-Maria Alexandri & Eirini-Marina Alexandri | 85.0637 | 85.2667 | 170.3304 |
| 13 | Brazil | Luisa Borges & Maria Eduarda Miccuci | 83.3008 | 84.0333 | 167.3341 |
| 14 | Switzerland | Sophie Giger & Sascia Kraus | 83.3366 | 83.5667 | 166.9033 |
| 15 | Kazakhstan | Alexandra Nemich & Yekaterina Nemich | 81.4686 | 81.4000 | 162.8686 |
| 16 | Colombia | Estefanía Álvarez & Mónica Arango | 80.3363 | 80.4667 | 160.8030 |
| 17 | Great Britain | Katie Clark & Olivia Federici | 80.7650 | 79.9667 | 160.7317 |
| 18 | Czech Republic | Alžběta Dufková & Soňa Bernardová | 80.0640 | 80.5333 | 160.5973 |
| 19 | Argentina | Etel Sánchez & Sofia Sánchez | 79.4829 | 79.8333 | 159.3162 |
| 20 | Israel | Anastasia Gloushkov & Ievgeniia Tetelbaum | 79.4488 | 78.9000 | 158.3488 |
| 21 | Belarus | Iryna Limanouskaya & Veronika Yesipovich | 78.9913 | 79.0000 | 157.9913 |
| 22 | Slovakia | Nada Daabousová & Jana Labáthová | 78.3607 | 77.7000 | 156.0607 |
| 23 | Egypt | Samia Ahmed & Dara Hassanien | 76.5306 | 77.6000 | 154.1306 |
| 24 | Australia | Nikita Pablo & Rose Stackpole | 73.6360 | 74.7667 | 148.4027 |

=== Final ===
| Rank | Country | Athletes | Technical | Free | Total |
|---|---|---|---|---|---|
| 1st place, gold medalist(s) | Russia | Natalia Ishchenko & Svetlana Romashina | 96.4577 | 98.5333 | 194.9910 |
| 2nd place, silver medalist(s) | China | Huang Xuechen & Sun Wenyan | 95.3688 | 97.0000 | 192.3688 |
| 3rd place, bronze medalist(s) | Japan | Yukiko Inui & Risako Mitsui | 93.1214 | 94.9333 | 188.0547 |
| 4 | Ukraine | Lolita Ananasova & Anna Voloshyna | 93.1358 | 94.0000 | 187.1358 |
| 5 | Spain | Ona Carbonell & Gemma Mengual | 92.5024 | 94.1333 | 186.6357 |
| 6 | Italy | Linda Cerruti & Costanza Ferro | 90.4412 | 92.3667 | 182.8079 |
| 7 | Canada | Jacqueline Simoneau & Karine Thomas | 89.2916 | 90.6000 | 179.8916 |
| 8 | France | Margaux Chrétien & Laura Augé | 86.2824 | 87.9667 | 174.2491 |
| 9 | United States | Anita Alvarez & Mariya Koroleva | 86.4612 | 87.5333 | 173.9945 |
| 10 | Greece | Evangelia Papazoglou & Evangelia Platanioti | 85.3550 | 86.5000 | 171.8550 |
| 11 | Mexico | Karem Achach & Nuria Diosdado | 84.9268 | 86.0667 | 170.9935 |
| 12 | Austria | Anna-Maria Alexandri & Eirini-Marina Alexandri | 85.0637 | 85.5333 | 170.5970 |
