= Maria Eduarda Miccuci =

Brazilian synchronized swimmer

Personal information
- Born: 7 June 1995 (age 31)

Sport
- Country: Brazil
- Sport: Synchronized swimming

Maria Eduarda Miccuci (born 7 June 1995) is a Brazilian synchronized swimmer. She competed in the women's duet at the 2016 Summer Olympics.
