= Evangelia Papazoglou =

Greek synchronized swimmer (born 1995)

Personal information
- Born: 14 January 1995 (age 30); Athens, Greece
- Height: 172 cm (5 ft 8 in)
- Weight: 60 kg (132 lb)

Sport
- Country: Greece
- Sport: Synchronized swimming

Evangelia (Evelina) Papazoglou (Greek: Ευαγγελία Παπαζογλου; born 14 January 1995) is a Greek synchronized swimmer. She competed in the women's duet at the 2016 Summer Olympics. Her partner was Evangelia Platanioti. They finished in 10th place.

In 2018, Papazoglou and Platanioti finished in 6th place in the duet technical routine at the 2018 European Aquatics Championships. In the duet free routine they finished in 5th place.
