= Gelena Topilina =

Russian synchronized swimmer

Personal information
- Full name: Gelena Dmitrievna Topilina
- National team: Russia
- Born: 11 January 1994 (age 32) Moscow, Russia
- Height: 1.75 m (5 ft 9 in)
- Weight: 56 kg (123 lb)

Sport
- Sport: Swimming
- Strokes: Synchronized swimming
Medal record
Olympic Games
Gold medal – first place	2016 Rio de Janeiro	Team
World Championships
Gold medal – first place	2015 Kazan	Team technical routine
Gold medal – first place	2015 Kazan	Team free routine
Gold medal – first place	2015 Kazan	Free routine combination
European Championships
Gold medal – first place	2014 Berlin	Team routine
Gold medal – first place	2016 London	Team technical routine
Gold medal – first place	2016 London	Combination routine

Gelena Dmitrievna Topilina (Russian: Гелена Дмитриевна Топилина), born 11 January 1994, is a Russian competitor in synchronized swimming.

She won 3 gold medals at 2015 World Aquatics Championships and a gold medal at the 2014 European Aquatics Championships.
