= Aiko Hayashi =

Japanese synchronized swimmer

Personal information
- National team: Japan
- Born: 17 November 1993 (age 32) Osaka, Osaka Prefecture, Japan
- Height: 1.66 m (5 ft 5 in)

Sport
- Sport: Swimming
- Strokes: Synchronized swimming
Medal record
Women's synchronized swimming
Representing Japan
Olympic Games
Bronze medal – third place	2016 Rio de Janeiro	Team
World Championships
Bronze medal – third place	2015 Kazan	Team Free Routine
Bronze medal – third place	2015 Kazan	Free Routine Combination
Asian Championships
Gold medal – first place	2016 Tokyo	Team technical routine
Gold medal – first place	2016 Tokyo	Team free routine
Gold medal – first place	2016 Tokyo	Free routine combination
Gold medal – first place	2016 Tokyo	Team Highlights

Aiko Hayashi (林 愛子, Hayashi Aiko; born 17 November 1993) is a Japanese competitor in synchronized swimming.

She won two bronze medals at the 2015 World Aquatics Championships.

Hayashi won a bronze medal in women's team synchronized swimming at the 2016 Summer Olympics.
