= Liliia Nizamova =

Russian swimmer

Personal information
- Full name: Liliia Ferkhatovna Nizamova
- National team: Russia
- Born: 21 May 1991 (age 35) Naberezhnye Chelny, Russian SFSR, Soviet Union
- Height: 1.71 m (5 ft 7 in)

Sport
- Sport: Swimming
- Strokes: Synchronized swimming
Medal record
World Championships
Gold medal – first place	2015 Kazan	Free routine combination
European Championships
Gold medal – first place	2016 London	Team technical routine
Gold medal – first place	2016 London	Combination routine

Liliia Ferkhatovna Nizamova (Russian: Лилия Ферхатовна Низамова, born 21 May 1991) is a Russian competitor in synchronized swimming.

She won a gold medal at the 2015 World Aquatics Championships.
