= Gu Xiao =

Chinese synchronized swimmer

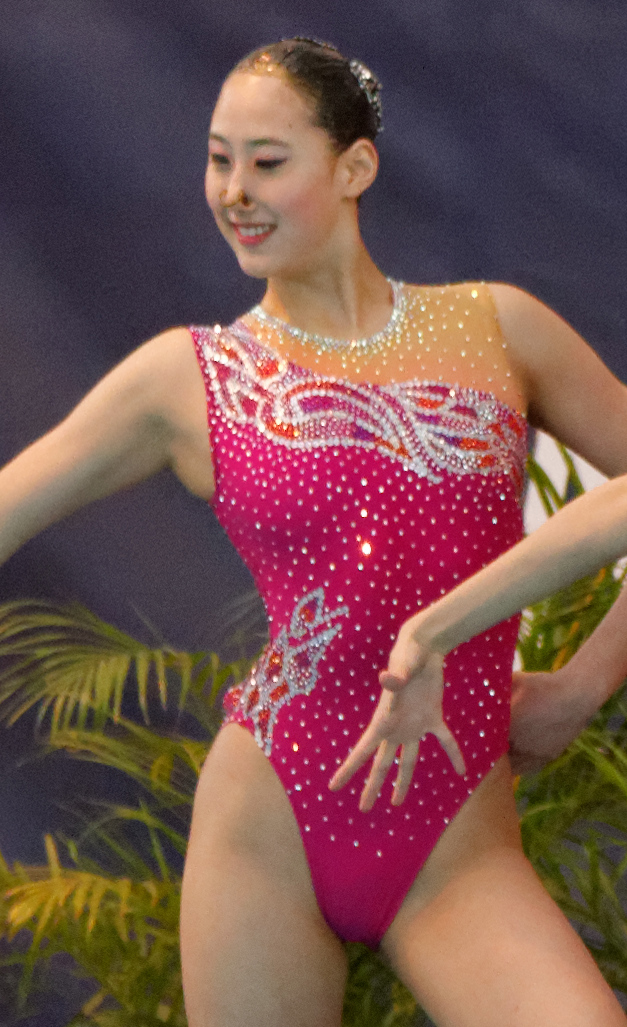
- Gu Xiao at the 2013 French Open

Personal information
- Born: March 18, 1993 (age 33) Nanjing, Jiangsu, China
- Height: 1.75 m (5 ft 9 in)
- Weight: 60 kg (132 lb)

Sport
- Sport: Swimming
- Strokes: Synchronized swimming
Medal record
Women's synchronized swimming
Representing China
Olympic Games
Silver medal – second place	2016 Rio de Janeiro	Team
World Championships
Silver medal – second place	2015 Kazan	Team technical
Silver medal – second place	2015 Kazan	Team free
Silver medal – second place	2015 Kazan	Free combination
World Cup
Gold medal – first place	2014 Quebec City	Team
Gold medal – first place	2014 Quebec City	Free combination
Asian Games
Gold medal – first place	2014 Incheon	Team
Gold medal – first place	2014 Incheon	Combination

Gu Xiao (Chinese: 顾笑, born 18 March 1993) is a Chinese competitor in synchronized swimming.

She won 3 silver medals at the 2015 World Aquatics Championships and a silver medal at the 2016 Summer Olympics.
