= Zeng Zhen =

Chinese synchronized swimmer

Personal information
- National team: China
- Born: 28 November 1993 (age 32) Chengdu, Sichuan, China
- Height: 1.70 m (5 ft 7 in)
- Weight: 61 kg (134 lb)

Sport
- Sport: Swimming
- Strokes: Synchronized swimming
Medal record
Women's synchronized swimming
Representing China
Olympic Games
Silver medal – second place	2016 Rio de Janeiro	Team
World Championships
Silver medal – second place	2015 Kazan	Team Technical Routine
Silver medal – second place	2015 Kazan	Team Free Routine
Silver medal – second place	2015 Kazan	Free Routine Combination
Asian Games
Gold medal – first place	2014 Incheon	Team Routine
Gold medal – first place	2014 Incheon	Combined Routine

Zeng Zhen (Chinese: 曾珍, born 28 November 1993 in Chengdu) is a Chinese competitor in synchronized swimming.

She has won 3 silver medals at the 2015 World Aquatics Championships, as well as 2 gold medals at the 2014 Asian Games.
