= Tang Mengni =

Chinese synchronized swimmer

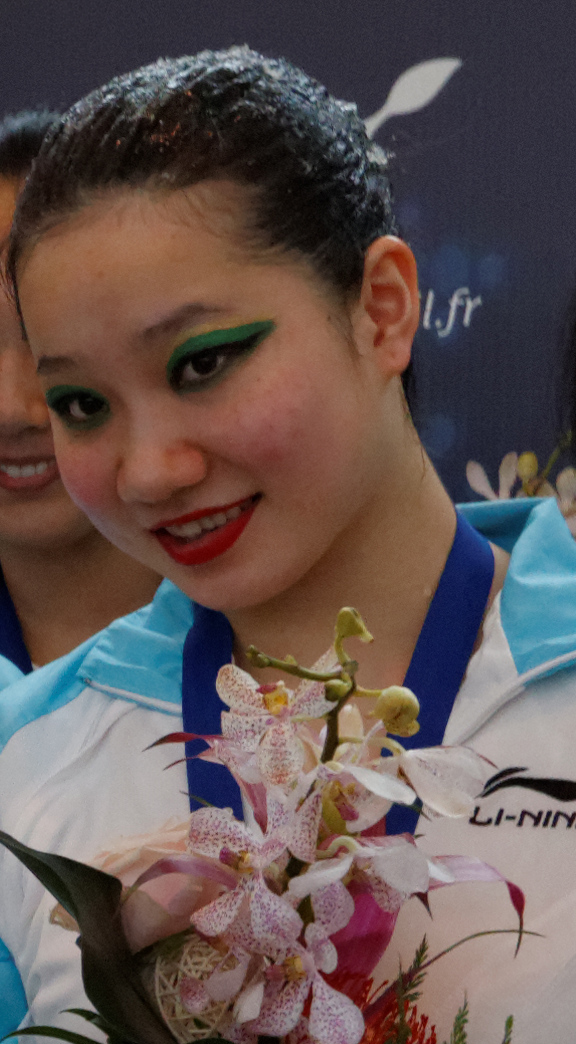
- Tang Mengni at Open Make Up For Ever 2013

Personal information
- National team: China
- Born: 8 April 1994 (age 32) Shanghai, China
- Height: 1.69 m (5 ft 7 in)
- Weight: 59 kg (130 lb)

Sport
- Sport: Swimming
- Strokes: Synchronised swimming
Medal record
Women's synchronised swimming
Representing China
Olympic Games
| Silver medal – second place | 2016 Rio de Janeiro | Team |
World Championships
| Gold medal – first place | 2017 Budapest | Free routine combination |
| Silver medal – second place | 2015 Kazan | Team technical routine |
| Silver medal – second place | 2015 Kazan | Team free routine |
| Silver medal – second place | 2015 Kazan | Free routine vombination |
| Silver medal – second place | 2017 Budapest | Team technical routine |
| Silver medal – second place | 2017 Budapest | Team free routine |
| Silver medal – second place | 2019 Gwangju | Free routine combination |
Asian Games
| Gold medal – first place | 2014 Incheon | Team routine |
| Gold medal – first place | 2014 Incheon | Combined routine |

Tang Mengni (Chinese: 汤梦妮, born 8 April 1994) is a Chinese competitor in synchronised swimming.

She has won 3 silver medals at the 2015 World Aquatics Championships, as well as 2 gold medals at the 2014 Asian Games.
