= Sun Yijing =

Chinese synchronized swimmer

Personal information
- National team: China
- Born: November 20, 1992 (age 33) Shanghai, China
- Height: 1.81 m (5 ft 11 in)
- Weight: 66 kg (146 lb)

Sport
- Sport: Swimming
- Strokes: Synchronized swimming
Medal record
Women's synchronized swimming
Representing China
World Championships
Silver medal – second place	2015 Kazan	Free Routine Combination
Asian Games
Gold medal – first place	2014 Incheon	Team Routine
Gold medal – first place	2014 Incheon	Combined Routine

Sun Yijing (Chinese: 孙怡靖, born 20 November 1992 in Shanghai) is a Chinese competitor in synchronized swimming.

She won a silver medal at the 2015 World Aquatics Championships, and 2 gold medals at the 2014 Asian Games.
