= Rose Stackpole =

Australian synchronized swimmer

Personal information
- Born: 25 May 1995 (age 31)

Sport
- Country: Australia
- Sport: Synchronized swimming

Rose Stackpole (born 25 May 1995) is an Australian synchronized swimmer. She competed in the women's duet at the 2016 Summer Olympics.
