= Li Xiaolu (synchronized swimmer) =

Chinese synchronized swimmer

Personal information
- National team: China
- Born: November 7, 1992 (age 33) Xiangtan, Hunan, China
- Height: 1.66 m (5 ft 5 in)
- Weight: 51 kg (112 lb)

Sport
- Sport: Swimming
- Strokes: Synchronized swimming
Medal record
Women's synchronized swimming
Representing China
Olympic Games
Silver medal – second place	2016 Rio de Janeiro	Team
World Championships
Silver medal – second place	2015 Kazan	Team Technical Routine
Silver medal – second place	2015 Kazan	Team Free Routine
Silver medal – second place	2015 Kazan	Free Routine Combination
Asian Games
Gold medal – first place	2014 Incheon	Team Routine
Gold medal – first place	2014 Incheon	Combined Routine

Li Xiaolu (Chinese: 李晓璐, born 7 November 1992 in Xiangtan) is a Chinese competitor in synchronized swimming.

She has won 3 silver medals at the 2015 World Aquatics Championships, as well as 2 gold medals at the 2014 Asian Games.
