= Guo Li =

Chinese synchronized swimmer

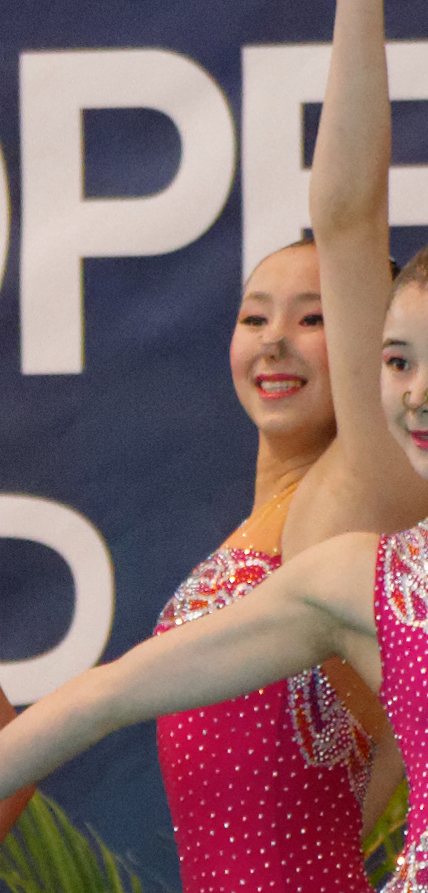
- Guo at the 2013 French Open

Personal information
- Born: 11 May 1993 (age 33) Nanjing, Jiangsu, China
- Height: 1.67 m (5 ft 6 in)
- Weight: 54 kg (119 lb)

Sport
- Sport: Swimming
- Strokes: Synchronised swimming
- Club: Jiangsu Province
Medal record
Women's synchronised swimming
Representing China
Olympic Games
Silver medal – second place	2016 Rio de Janeiro	Team
Silver medal – second place	2020 Tokyo	Team
World Championships
Gold medal – first place	2017 Budapest	Free combination
Silver medal – second place	2011 Shanghai	Free combination
Silver medal – second place	2015 Kazan	Team technical
Silver medal – second place	2015 Kazan	Team free
Silver medal – second place	2015 Kazan	Free combination
Silver medal – second place	2017 Budapest	Team technical
Silver medal – second place	2017 Budapest	Team free
Silver medal – second place	2019 Gwangju	Team technical routine
Silver medal – second place	2019 Gwangju	Team free routine
Silver medal – second place	2019 Gwangju	Free routine combination
World Cup
Gold medal – first place	2014 Quebec City	Team
Gold medal – first place	2014 Quebec City	Free combination
Asian Games
Gold medal – first place	2014 Incheon	Team
Gold medal – first place	2014 Incheon	Combination
Gold medal – first place	2018 Jakarta	Team

Guo Li (Chinese: 呙俐, born 11 May 1993) is a Chinese competitor in synchronised swimming.

She won a silver medal at the 2011 World Aquatics Championships and 3 silver medals at the 2015 World Aquatics Championships. She also won a silver medal at the 2016 Summer Olympics.

She is now a coach in China's National Swimming Team.
