= Liang Xinping =

Chinese synchronized swimmer

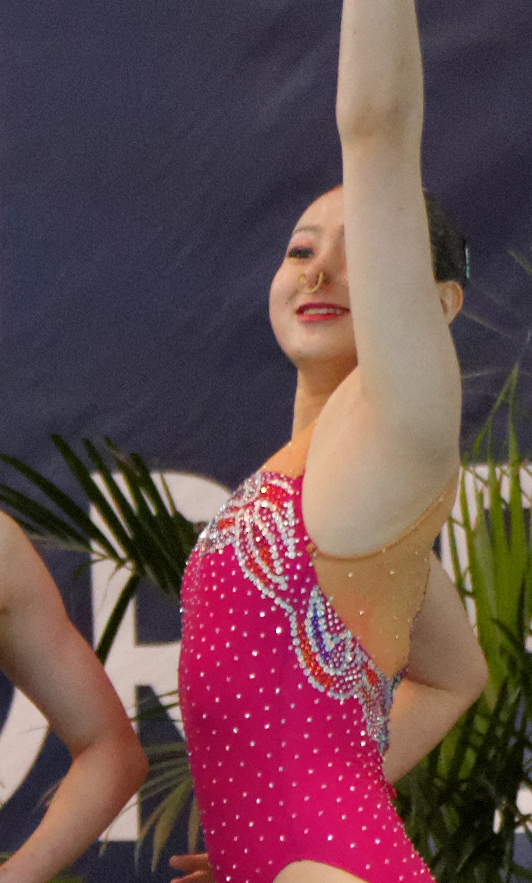
- Liang at the 2013 French Open

Personal information
- Born: 31 July 1994 (age 31) Huai'an, Jiangsu, China
- Height: 1.71 m (5 ft 7 in)
- Weight: 60 kg (132 lb)

Sport
- Sport: Swimming
- Strokes: Synchronised swimming
Medal record
Women's synchronised swimming
Representing China
Olympic Games
| Silver medal – second place | 2016 Rio de Janeiro | Team |
| Silver medal – second place | 2020 Tokyo | Team |
World Championships
| Gold medal – first place | 2017 Budapest | Free combination |
| Silver medal – second place | 2015 Kazan | Team technical |
| Silver medal – second place | 2015 Kazan | Team free |
| Silver medal – second place | 2015 Kazan | Free combination |
| Silver medal – second place | 2017 Budapest | Team technical |
| Silver medal – second place | 2017 Budapest | Team free |
| Silver medal – second place | 2019 Gwangju | Team technical routine |
| Silver medal – second place | 2019 Gwangju | Team free routine |
| Silver medal – second place | 2019 Gwangju | Free routine combination |
World Cup
| Gold medal – first place | 2014 Quebec City | Team |
| Gold medal – first place | 2014 Quebec City | Free combination |
Asian Games
| Gold medal – first place | 2014 Incheon | Team |
| Gold medal – first place | 2014 Incheon | Combination |
| Gold medal – first place | 2018 Jakarta | Team |

Liang Xinping (Chinese: 梁馨枰, born 31 July 1994) is a Chinese competitor in synchronised swimming.

She won three silver medals at the 2015 World Aquatics Championships and a silver medal at the 2016 Summer Olympics.
