= Kei Marumo =

Japanese synchronized swimmer

Personal information
- National team: Japan
- Born: 6 March 1992 (age 34) Osaka Prefecture, Japan
- Height: 1.60 m (5 ft 3 in)
- Weight: 50 kg (110 lb)

Sport
- Sport: Swimming
- Strokes: Synchronized swimming
Medal record
Women's synchronized swimming
Representing Japan
Olympic Games
Bronze medal – third place	2016 Rio de Janeiro	Team
World Championships
Bronze medal – third place	2015 Kazan	Team Technical Routine
Bronze medal – third place	2015 Kazan	Team Free Routine
Bronze medal – third place	2015 Kazan	Free Routine Combination
Bronze medal – third place	2017 Budapest	Team technical routine
Bronze medal – third place	2017 Budapest	Free routine combination
Asian Games
Silver medal – second place	2014 Incheon	Team Routine
Silver medal – second place	2014 Incheon	Combined Routine
Silver medal – second place	2018 Jakarta	Team Routine
Asian Championships
Gold medal – first place	2016 Tokyo	Team technical routine
Gold medal – first place	2016 Tokyo	Team free routine
Gold medal – first place	2016 Tokyo	Free routine combination
Gold medal – first place	2016 Tokyo	Team Highlights
Summer Universiade
Silver medal – second place	2013 Kazan	Team Routine
Silver medal – second place	2013 Kazan	Combined Routine

Kei Marumo (丸茂 圭衣, Marumo Kei; born 6 March 1992) is a Japanese competitor in synchronized swimming.

She won three bronze medals at the 2015 World Aquatics Championships as well as two silver medals at the 2014 Asian Games. She also won two silver medals at the 2013 Summer Universiade.
