= Risako Mitsui =

Japanese synchronized swimmer

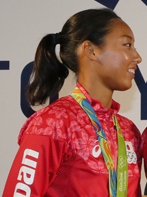
- 2016

Personal information
- Born: 23 September 1993 (age 32) Shinjuku, Japan
- Height: 1.68 m (5 ft 6 in)

Sport
- Country: Japan
- Sport: Synchronized swimming
- Club: Tokyo Synchro Club
Medal record
Synchronized swimming
Representing Japan
Olympic Games
| Bronze medal – third place | 2016 Rio de Janeiro | Duet |
| Bronze medal – third place | 2016 Rio de Janeiro | Team |
World Championships
| Bronze medal – third place | 2015 Kazan | Duet technical routine |
| Bronze medal – third place | 2015 Kazan | Team technical routine |
| Bronze medal – third place | 2015 Kazan | Team free routine |
| Bronze medal – third place | 2015 Kazan | Free routine combination |
Asian Games
| Silver medal – second place | 2014 Incheon | Women's duet |
| Silver medal – second place | 2014 Incheon | Women's team |
| Silver medal – second place | 2014 Incheon | Women's combination |
Summer Universiade
| Silver medal – second place | 2013 Kazan | Women's team |
| Silver medal – second place | 2013 Kazan | Women's combination |
- Updated on 27 July 2015

Risako Mitsui (三井 梨紗子, Mitsui Risako; born 23 September 1993) is a Japanese synchronized swimmer.

== Career ==
She competed in the women's team event at the 2012 Olympic Games.
