= Vitaliy Khudyakov =

Kazakhstani swimmer

Personal information
- Born: August 7, 1994 (age 32)

Sport
- Sport: Swimming

Vitaliy Khudyakov (Виталий Евгеньевич Худяков, born August 7, 1994) is a Kazakhstani marathon swimmer. Current Capri-Napoli Marathon record holder which he set in 2014. He competed in the men's marathon 10 kilometre event at the 2016 Summer Olympics but was disqualified.
