= Luisa Borges =

Brazilian synchronized swimmer

Personal information
- Born: 20 April 1996 (age 30)

Sport
- Country: Brazil
- Sport: Synchronized swimming

Luisa Borges (born 20 April 1996) is a Brazilian synchronized swimmer. She competed in the women's duet at the 2016 Summer Olympics.
