= Yin Chengxin =

Chinese synchronized swimmer

Personal information
- National team: China
- Born: 5 February 1995 (age 31) Wuhan, Hubei, China
- Height: 1.68 m (5 ft 6 in)
- Weight: 58 kg (128 lb)

Sport
- Sport: Swimming
- Strokes: Synchronised swimming
Medal record
Women's synchronised swimming
Representing China
Olympic Games
Silver medal – second place	2016 Rio de Janeiro	Team
Silver medal – second place	2020 Tokyo	Team
World Championships
Gold medal – first place	2017 Budapest	Free routine combination
Silver medal – second place	2015 Kazan	Team Free Routine
Silver medal – second place	2015 Kazan	Free Routine Combination
Silver medal – second place	2017 Budapest	Team technical routine
Silver medal – second place	2017 Budapest	Team free routine
Silver medal – second place	2019 Gwangju	Team technical routine
Silver medal – second place	2019 Gwangju	Team free routine
Silver medal – second place	2019 Gwangju	Free routine combination
Asian Games
Gold medal – first place	2014 Incheon	Combined Routine
Gold medal – first place	2018 Jakarta	Team Routine

Yin Chengxin (Chinese: 尹成昕, born 5 February 1995) is a Chinese competitor in synchronised swimming.

She won two silver medals at the 2015 World Aquatics Championships, and one gold medal at the 2014 Asian Games.
