= Yukiko Inui =

Japanese synchronized swimmer

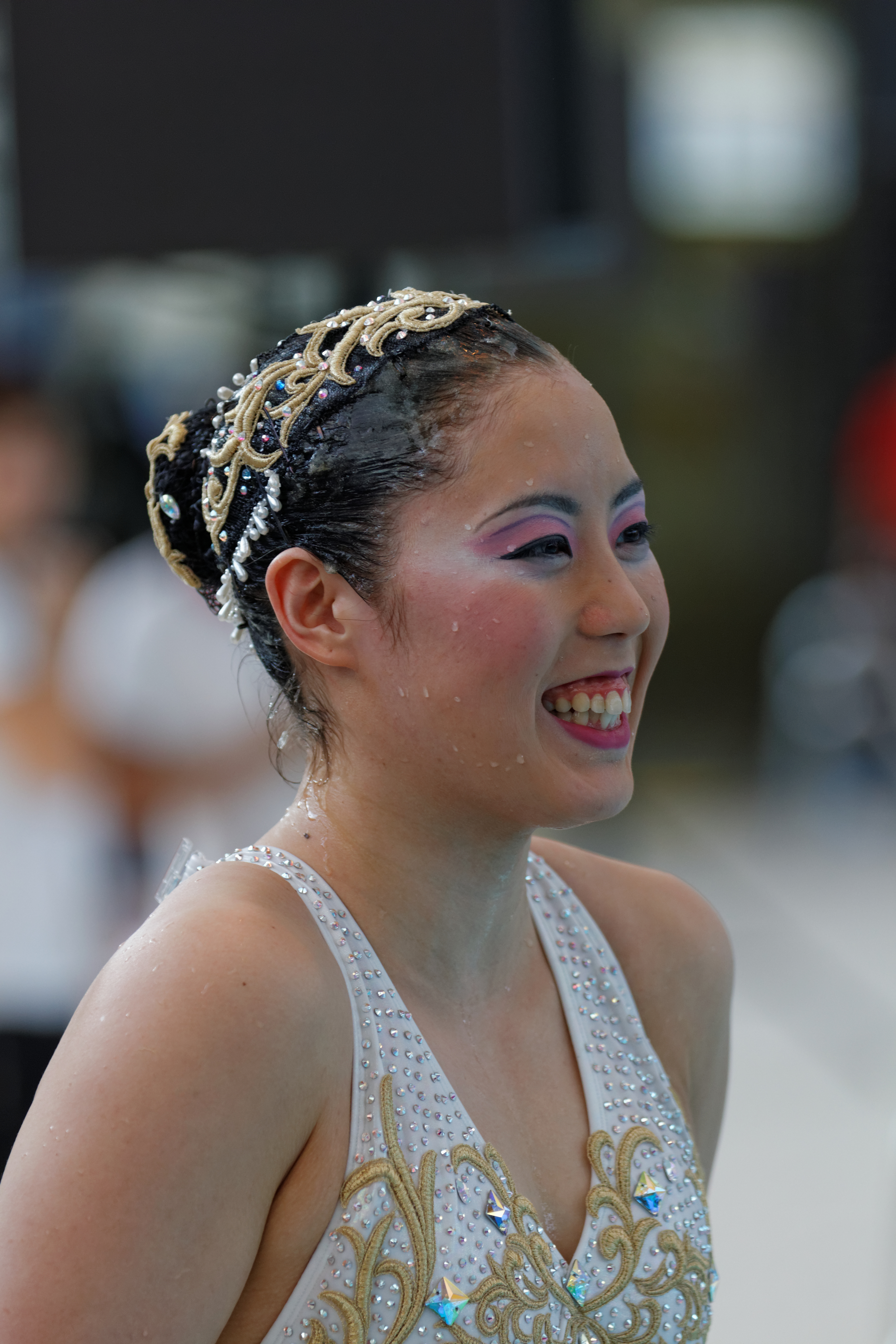
- Yukiko Inui in March 2013

Personal information
- Nationality: Japanese
- Born: 4 December 1990 (age 35) Omihachiman, Shiga Prefecture, Japan
- Height: 1.70 m (5 ft 7 in)
- Weight: 55 kg (121 lb)

Sport
- Sport: Swimming
- Strokes: Synchronised swimming
- Club: Imura Synchro Club
Medal record
Synchronised swimming
Representing Japan
Olympic Games
Bronze medal – third place	2016 Rio de Janeiro	Duet
Bronze medal – third place	2016 Rio de Janeiro	Team
World Championships
Gold medal – first place	2022 Budapest	Solo technical routine
Gold medal – first place	2022 Budapest	Solo free routine
Gold medal – first place	2023 Fukuoka	Solo technical routine
Gold medal – first place	2023 Fukuoka	Solo free routine
Bronze medal – third place	2015 Kazan	Duet technical routine
Bronze medal – third place	2015 Kazan	Team technical routine
Bronze medal – third place	2015 Kazan	Team free routine
Bronze medal – third place	2015 Kazan	Free routine combination
Bronze medal – third place	2017 Budapest	Team technical routine
Bronze medal – third place	2017 Budapest	Free routine combination
Bronze medal – third place	2019 Gwangju	Solo technical routine
Bronze medal – third place	2019 Gwangju	Solo free routine
Asian Games
Silver medal – second place	2010 Guangzhou	Duet
Silver medal – second place	2010 Guangzhou	Team
Silver medal – second place	2010 Guangzhou	Combination
Silver medal – second place	2014 Incheon	Duet
Silver medal – second place	Incheon	Team
Silver medal – second place	2014 Incheon	Combination
Silver medal – second place	2018 Jakarta-Palembang	Duet
Silver medal – second place	2018 Jakarta-Palembang	Team
Asian Championships
Gold medal – first place	2016 Tokyo	Solo technical
Gold medal – first place	2016 Tokyo	Solo free routine
Gold medal – first place	2016 Tokyo	Duet technical routine
Gold medal – first place	2016 Tokyo	Duet free routine
Gold medal – first place	2016 Tokyo	Team free routine
Gold medal – first place	2016 Tokyo	Free routine combination

Yukiko Inui (乾 友紀子, Inui Yukiko; born 4 December 1990) is a Japanese competitor in synchronised swimming. She won Japan's first gold medal in each the solo technical routine and the solo free routine at a FINA World Aquatics Championships at the 2022 World Aquatics Championships. She competed at the 2020 Summer Olympics, in the duet event with Megumu Yoshida, and in the team event.

== Career ==
Yukiko competed in both the women's duet with her partner Chisa Kobayashi, and the women's team events at the 2012 Summer Olympics; she finished in fifth place in both competitions.

Inui has also been a regular competitor at the World Aquatics Championships, taking part in the 2009, 2011 and 2013 tournaments. Her notable podium victories to date include the Asian Games where she has won six silver medals at Guangzhou and Incheon.

At the 2016 Summer Olympics, she won two bronze medals, one in the duet event with Risako Mitsui, and one in the team event.

She won bronze at the 2019 World Aquatics Championships in the Solo Technical Event.

At the 2022 World Aquatics Championships in Budapest, Hungary, Inui won the first medal in any sport of the Championships, winning the gold medal in the solo technical routine, with a score of 92.8662 points. Her gold medal was the first for Japan in the event at a FINA World Aquatics Championships and was choreographed to music by fellow Japanese Hideki Togi in the theme of "The legend of Phoenix". In the preliminaries of the solo free routine two days later, she achieved a score of 94.5667 points and qualified for the final ranking first. For the final, she scored 95.3667 points to win the gold medal, another first gold medal for the country of Japan in the event at a FINA World Aquatics Championships. Her two gold medals made Japan the third country in the 21st century, after Russia and China, to win multiple gold medals in artistic swimming at a single FINA World Aquatics Championships.
