= Sun Wenyan =

Chinese synchronized swimmer

Personal information
- Nationality: Chinese
- Born: 27 December 1989 (age 36) Changsha, China
- Height: 1.70 m (5 ft 7 in)
- Weight: 58 kg (128 lb)

Sport
- Country: China
- Sport: Synchronised swimming
- Event: Duet
- Club: Hunan Province
Medal record
Women's Synchronised swimming
Representing China
Olympic Games
Silver medal – second place	2012 London	Team
Silver medal – second place	2016 Rio de Janeiro	Duet
Silver medal – second place	2016 Rio de Janeiro	Team
Silver medal – second place	2020 Tokyo	Duet
Silver medal – second place	2020 Tokyo	Team
World Championships
Silver medal – second place	2015 Kazan	Duet technical routine
Silver medal – second place	2015 Kazan	Duet free routine
Silver medal – second place	2015 Kazan	Team technical routine
Silver medal – second place	2015 Kazan	Team free routine
Silver medal – second place	2015 Kazan	Free routine combination
Silver medal – second place	2019 Gwangju	Duet technical routine
Silver medal – second place	2019 Gwangju	Duet free routine
Silver medal – second place	2019 Gwangju	Team technical routine
Silver medal – second place	2019 Gwangju	Team free routine
Silver medal – second place	2019 Gwangju	Free routine combination
Bronze medal – third place	2015 Kazan	Solo technical routine

Sun Wenyan (Chinese: 孙文雁; pinyin: Sūn Wényàn; born 27 December 1989) is a Chinese competitor in synchronised swimming. She won a silver medal in team competition at the 2012 Summer Olympics. At the 2016 Olympics, she won another silver in the team competition, and a silver in the duet event with Huang Xuechen.
