= Huang Xuechen =

Chinese synchronized swimmer

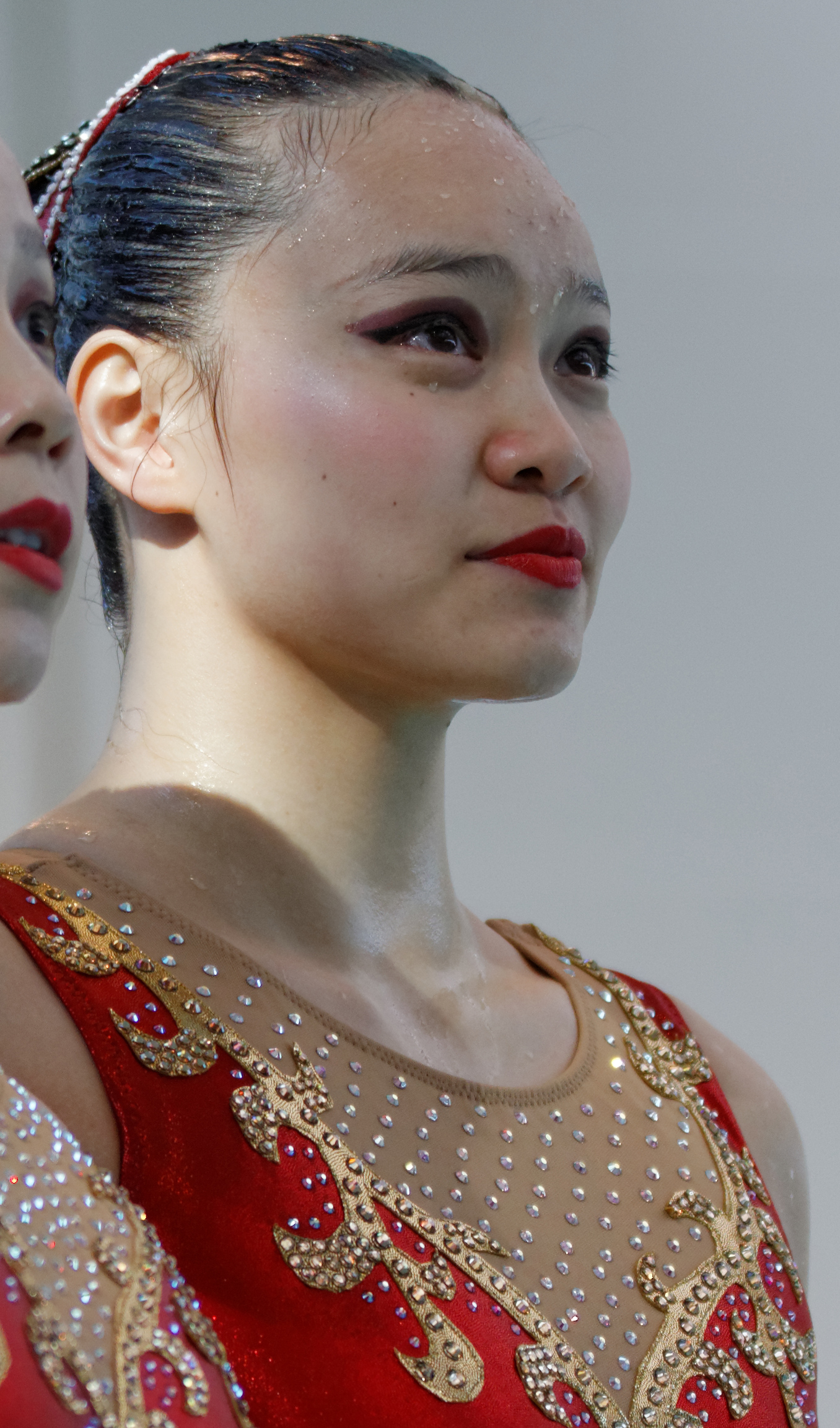
- Huang at Open Make Up For Ever 2013

Personal information
- Nationality: Chinese
- Born: 25 February 1990 (age 36) Shanghai, China
- Height: 1.75 m (5 ft 9 in)
- Weight: 61 kg (134 lb)

Sport
- Sport: Swimming
- Strokes: Synchronised swimming
- Club: Shanghai
Medal record
Women's Synchronised swimming
Representing China
Event	1st	2nd	3rd
Olympic Games	0	5	2
World Championships	0	16	2
Total	0	21	4
Olympic Games
Silver medal – second place	2012 London	Team
Silver medal – second place	2016 Rio de Janeiro	Duet
Silver medal – second place	2016 Rio de Janeiro	Team
Silver medal – second place	2020 Tokyo	Duet
Silver medal – second place	2020 Tokyo	Team
Bronze medal – third place	2008 Beijing	Team
Bronze medal – third place	2012 London	Duet
World Championships
Silver medal – second place	2009 Rome	Free routine combination
Silver medal – second place	2011 Shanghai	Solo technical routine
Silver medal – second place	2011 Shanghai	Duet technical routine
Silver medal – second place	2011 Shanghai	Team technical routine
Silver medal – second place	2011 Shanghai	Free routine combination
Silver medal – second place	2011 Shanghai	Team free routine
Silver medal – second place	2013 Barcelona	Solo technical routine
Silver medal – second place	2013 Barcelona	Solo free routine
Silver medal – second place	2015 Kazan	Solo free routine
Silver medal – second place	2015 Kazan	Duet technical routine
Silver medal – second place	2015 Kazan	Duet free routine
Silver medal – second place	2015 Kazan	Team technical routine
Silver medal – second place	2019 Gwangju	Duet technical routine
Silver medal – second place	2019 Gwangju	Duet free routine
Silver medal – second place	2019 Gwangju	Team technical routine
Silver medal – second place	2019 Gwangju	Team free routine
Bronze medal – third place	2009 Rome	Team Technical Routine
Bronze medal – third place	2009 Rome	Team Free Routine

Huang Xuechen (黄雪辰, Huáng Xuěchén, born 25 February 1990) is a Chinese Olympic synchronised swimmer.

== Early life ==
Huang was born in Shanghai on 1990. In 1996, she entered Shanghai Peihua School to start training in swimming and in 2000, she switched to synchronized swimming. In 2002, Huang entered the Shanghai University of Sport.

== Career ==
In 2005, Huang entered the national youth team and in 2006, entered the national team. In 2009, Huang won the third place in the synchronized swimming double free-routine at the 11th National Games in Shandong.

Huang competed in the women's team event at the 2008 Summer Olympics where she won a bronze medal.

She followed up this success in the women's duet (with Liu Ou) and women's team events at the 2012 Summer Olympics where she won a bronze and silver medal respectively. At the 2016 Summer Olympics, she won two silver medals, one in the duet (with Sun Wenyan) and one in the team event.
