= Yekaterina Nemich =

Kazakhstani synchronized swimmer

Personal information
- Born: 3 January 1995 (age 31) Temirtau, Kazakhstan
- Height: 169 cm (5 ft 7 in)
- Weight: 51 kg (112 lb)

Sport
- Country: Kazakhstan
- Sport: Synchronized swimming
Medal record
Asian Games
Bronze medal – third place	2010 Guangzhou	Combination
Bronze medal – third place	2014 Incheon	Duet
Bronze medal – third place	2014 Incheon	Combination
Bronze medal – third place	2018 Jakarta	Duet

Yekaterina Nemich (Екатерина Немич, born 3 January 1995) is a Kazakhstani synchronized swimmer. She competed in the women's duet at the 2016 Summer Olympics and the 2020 Summer Olympics. She is the twin sister of Alexandra Nemich.
