= Synchronized swimming at the 2011 Pan American Games – Women's team =

Women's team at the 2011 Pan American Games
- Venue: Scotiabank Aquatics Center
- Dates: October 19 – October 21
- Competitors: 56 from 7 nations

Medalists
Gold medal	Marie-Pier Boudreau Gagnon; Jo-Annie Fortin; Chloé Isaac; Stéphanie Leclair; Tracy Little; Élise Marcotte; Karine Thomas; Valerie Welsh	Canada
Silver medal	Morgan Fuller; Megan Hansley; Mary Killman; Mariya Koroleva; Michelle Moore; Leah Pinette; Lyssa Wallace; Alison Williams	United States
Bronze medal	Giovana Stephan; Joseane Costa; Lara Teixeira; Lorena Molinos; Maria Bruno; Maria Pereira; Nayara Figueira; Pamela Nogueira	Brazil

The women's team competition of the synchronized swimming events at the 2011 Pan American Games in Guadalajara were held from October 19 to October 21, at the Scotiabank Aquatics Center. The defending Pan American Champion is the team from the United States.

Seven teams competed, each consisting of eight swimmers. There was only a single round of competition. Each team presented two routines: the technical routine and the free routine. The technical routine consists of twelve required elements, which must be completed in order and within a time of between 2 minutes 35 seconds and 3 minutes 5 seconds. The free routine has no restrictions other than time; this routine must last between 3 minutes 45 seconds and 4 minutes 15 seconds.

== Schedule ==
All times are Central Standard time (UTC-6).

Date	Time	Round
Wednesday, October 19	14:00	Technical routine
Friday, October 21	14:00	Free routine

== Results ==
Rank	Country	Technical	Free	Total
1	Canada; Marie-Pier Boudreau Gagnon; Jo-Annie Fortin; Chloé Isaac; Stéphanie Leclair; Tracy Little; Élise Marcotte; Karine Thomas; Valerie Welsh	94.875 (1)	95.513 (1)	190.388
2	United States; Morgan Fuller; Megan Hansley; Mary Killman; Maria Koroleva; Michelle Moore; Leah Pinette; Lyssa Wallace; Alison Williams	89.750 (2)	89.838 (2)	179.588
3	Brazil; Giovana Stephan; Joseane Costa; Lara Teixeira; Lorena Molinos; Maria Bruno; Maria Pereira; Nayara Figueira; Pamela Nogueira	87.625 (3)	88.800 (4)	176.425
4	Mexico; Mariana Cifuentes; Blanca Isabel Delgado; Evelyn Guajardo; Ofelia Pedrero; Karem Achach; Joana Jiménez; Claudia Aceves; Nuria Diosdado	86.750 (4)	89.088 (3)	175.838
5	Colombia; Paula Arcila; Jennifer Cerquera; Ingrid Cubillos; Zully Perez; Sara Rodríguez; Estefanía Álvarez; Sara Roldan; Juliana Arbelaez	79.750 (5)	80.263 (5)	160.013
6	Argentina; Etel Sánchez; Sofía Sánchez; Florencia Arce; Lucina Simon; Irina Bandurek; Brenda Moller; Maite Guraya; Sofia Ferrer	76.375 (6)	76.363 (6)	152.738
7	Aruba; Anouk Eman; Nikita Pablo; Amanda Maduro; Nathania Taylor; Jitva Sarman; Nathifa Sarman; Alexandra Mendoza; Neftaly Albertsz	70.625 (7)	71.525	142.150
