= Synchronized swimming at the 2015 Pan American Games – Women's team =

Women's team at the 2015 Pan American Games
- Venue: Toronto Pan Am Sports Centre
- Dates: July 9–11, 2015
- Competitors: 64 from 8 nations

Medalists
Gold medal	Jacqueline Simoneau; Karine Thomas; Gabriella Brisson; Annabelle Frappier; Claudia Holzner; Lisa Mikelberg; Marie-Lou Morin; Samantha Nealon; Lisa Sanders	Canada
Silver medal	Nuria Diosdado; Karem Achach; Teresa Alonso; Karla Arreola; Isabel Delgado; Evelyn Guajardo; Joana Jiménez; Luisa Rodríguez; Jessica Sobrino	Mexico
Bronze medal	Anita Alvarez; Claire Barton; Mary Killman; Mariya Koroleva; Isabel Malcolmson; Sandra Ortellado; Sarah Rodriguez; Karensa Tjoa; Alison Williams	United States

The women's team competition of the synchronized swimming events at the 2015 Pan American Games in Toronto was held from July 9 to July 11, at the Toronto Pan Am Sports Centre. The defending Pan American Champion was the team from Canada.

Eight teams competed, each consisting of eight swimmers. There is only a single round of competition. Each team presented two routines: the technical routine and the free routine. The technical routine consists of twelve required elements, which must be completed in order and within a time of between 2 minutes 35 seconds and 3 minutes 5 seconds. The free routine has no restrictions other than time; this routine must last between 3 minutes 45 seconds and 4 minutes 15 seconds.

== Schedule ==
All times are local Eastern Daylight Time (UTC−4)

Date	Start	Round
July 9, 2015	18:00	Technical routine
July 11, 2015	15:00	Free routine

== Results ==
Rank	Country	Athlete	Technical	Free	Total
1st place, gold medalist(s)	Canada	Jacqueline Simoneau; Karine Thomas; Gabriella Brisson; Annabelle Frappier; Claudia Holzner; Lisa Mikelberg; Marie-Lou Morin; Samantha Nealon; Lisa Sanders	87.9094 (1)	90.2000 (1)	178.1094
2nd place, silver medalist(s)	Mexico	Nuria Diosdado; Karem Achach; Teresa Alonso; Karla Arreola; Isabel Delgado; Evelyn Guajardo; Joana Jiménez; Luisa Rodríguez; Jessica Sobrino	85.6740 (2)	86.8333 (2)	172.5073
3rd place, bronze medalist(s)	United States	Anita Alvarez; Claire Barton; Mary Killman; Mariya Koroleva; Isabel Malcolmson; Sandra Ortellado; Sarah Rodriguez; Karensa Tjoa; Alison Williams	82.6018 (3)	83.4333 (3)	166.0351
4	Brazil	Luisa Borges; Maria Eduarda Miccuci; Lorena Molinos; Beatriz Feres; Branca Feres; Maria Bruno; Maria Clara Coutinho; Sabrine Lowe; Lara Teixeira	80.8605 (4)	82.9000 (4)	163.7605
5	Argentina	Etel Sánchez; Sofía Sánchez; Camila Maria Arregui; Lucia Paula Diaz; Sofia Eliceche; Ana Victoria Fernandez; Sofia Ana Boasso; Brenda Moller; Lucina Soledad Simon	76.4198 (5)	78.9000 (5)	155.3198
6	Aruba	Amanda Maduro; Alexandra Mendoza; Kiara Van Trikt; Janelle Flemming; Carondina Leijdekkers; Abigail de Veer; Anouk Eman; Kyra Hoevertsz; Neftaly Albertsz	68.4442 (6)	72.7667 (6)	141.2109
7	Peru	Camila Cayo; Ana Espinoza; Carla Morales; Sandy Quiroz; Karen Rolando; Cielomar Romero; Valeria Romero; Thais Yamashiro	66.4587 (7)	68.8333 (7)	135.2920
8	Cuba	Cristy Alfonso; Melissa Alonso; Keyla Armas; Yanela Chacon; Dyliam Marrero; Jennifer Quintanal; Sonia Roche; Odailys Suarez; Carysney Garcia	63.8392 (8)	64.8333 (8)	128.2725
