= Canada at the 2011 World Aquatics Championships =

- Flag of Canada
- World Aquatics code: CAN
- National federation: Aquatic Federation of Canada
- Website: www.canadianaquatics.com

in Shanghai, China
- Medals Ranked 20th: Gold 0 Silver 4 Bronze 3 Total 7

World Aquatics Championships appearances
- 1973; 1975; 1978; 1982; 1986; 1991; 1994; 1998; 2001; 2003; 2005; 2007; 2009; 2011; 2013; 2015; 2017; 2019; 2022; 2023; 2024; 2025

Canada competed at the 2011 World Aquatics Championships in Shanghai, China between July 16 and 31, 2011. Margie Schuett was the chef de mission.

== Medallists ==
Medal	Name	Sport	Event	Date
Silver	Emilie Heymans; Jennifer Abel	Diving	Women's 3 m synchronized springboard	16 July
Silver	Ryan Cochrane	Swimming	Men's 800 m freestyle	27 July
Silver	Brent Hayden	Swimming	Men's 100 m freestyle	28 July
Silver	Ryan Cochrane	Swimming	Men's 1500 m freestyle	31 July
Bronze	Geneviève Bélanger; Marie-Pier Boudreau Gagnon; Stéphanie Durocher; Jo-Annie Fortin; Chloé Isaac; Stéphanie Leclair; Tracy Little; Élise Marcotte; Karine Thomas; Valerie Welsh; Gabrielle Cardinal (reserve); Erin Willson (reserve)	Synchronised swimming	Free routine combination	21 July
Bronze	Jennifer Abel	Diving	Women's 3 m springboard	23 July
Bronze	Martha McCabe	Swimming	Women's 200 m breaststroke	29 July

Medals by sport
Sport	1st place, gold medalist(s)	2nd place, silver medalist(s)	3rd place, bronze medalist(s)	Total
Swimming	0	3	1	4
Diving	0	1	1	2
Synchronized swimming	0	0	1	1
Total	0	4	3	7

Medals by date
Date	1st place, gold medalist(s)	2nd place, silver medalist(s)	3rd place, bronze medalist(s)	Total
16 July	0	1	0	1
17 July	0	0	0	0
18 July	0	0	0	0
19 July	0	0	0	0
20 July	0	0	0	0
21 July	0	0	1	1
22 July	0	0	0	0
23 July	0	0	1	1
24 July	0	0	0	0
25 July	0	0	0	0
26 July	0	0	0	0
27 July	0	1	0	1
28 July	0	1	0	1
29 July	0	0	1	1
30 July	0	0	0	0
31 July	0	1	0	1
Total	0	4	3	7

== Diving ==
The Canada Cup diving grand prix held in Montreal between April 28 and May 1, 2011 will be the qualification tournament. Canada diving, the national governing body set qualification standards for athletes to qualify. For an athlete to qualify they must be in top 2 (Canadians) at the tournament and have reached the minimum score. Canada has qualified 9 athletes in diving.

Men

Athlete	Event	Preliminary		Semifinals		Final	
Athlete	Event	Points	Rank	Points	Rank	Points	Rank
François Imbeau-Dulac	1 m springboard	312.95	25			did not advance	
François Imbeau-Dulac	3 m springboard	376.40	29	did not advance			
Reuben Ross	1 m springboard	378.50	7 Q			401.40	6
Reuben Ross	3 m springboard	388.15	22	did not advance			
Eric Sehn	10 m platform	419.10	15 Q	388.15	18	did not advance	
Riley McCormick	10 m platform	434.70	11 Q	453.30	8 Q	444.50	9
Kevin Geyson; Eric Sehn	10 m synchronized platform	386.22	9 Q			386.70	8

Women

Athlete	Event	Preliminary		Semifinals		Final	
Athlete	Event	Points	Rank	Points	Rank	Points	Rank
Emilie Heymans	3 m springboard	324.20	5 Q	357.90	4 Q	270.00	12
Jennifer Abel	1 m springboard	250.95	14			did not advance	
Jennifer Abel	3 m springboard	307.55	10 Q	359.35	2 Q	365.10	3rd place, bronze medalist(s)
Meaghan Benfeito	10 m platform	336.90	3 Q	327.70	7 Q	375.50	4
Roseline Filion	10 m platform	324.20	6 Q	326.15	8 Q	333.00	8
Emilie Heymans; Jennifer Abel	3 m synchronized springboard	275.10	8 Q			313.50	Silver medal
Meaghan Benfeito; Roseline Filion	10 m synchronized platform	289.65	5			303.87	7

Withdrawn due to injury

- Alexandre Despatie – 3 meter synchro

== Open water swimming ==
Athletes that make up the team will be decided at the US 2011 10K Open Water National Championships & Team Trials in Fort Myers Beach, Florida, United States. After the selection event six swimmers were selected to compete, four men and two women.

Men

Athlete	Event	Final	
Athlete	Event	Time	Position
Richard Weinberger	5 km	56:33.7	17
Richard Weinberger	10 km	1:54:51.3	17
Aimeson King	5 km	59:09.3	31
Aimeson King	10 km	2:04:00.1	49
Xavier Desharnais	25 km	5:20:44.2	15
Simon Tobin	25 km	5:19:43.1	14

Women

Athlete	Event	Final	
Athlete	Event	Time	Position
Zsofia Balazs	5 km	1:01:39.0	26
Zsofia Balazs	10 km	2:10:01.7	40
Nadine Williams	5 km	1:02:06.8	29
Nadine Williams	10 km	2:13:35.5	44

Mixed

Athlete	Event	Final	
Athlete	Event	Time	Position
Zsofi Balazs; Aimeson King; Richard Weingerber	Team	1:02:08.7	10

== Swimming ==
Canada's team for these championships was selected from the World Championship trials held in Victoria, British Columbia between March 30 and April 2, 2011. 33 athletes will represent Canada in Shanghai along with 10 coaches.

The provisional events per athlete:

Men

Athlete	Event	Heats		Semifinals		Final	
Athlete	Event	Time	Rank	Time	Rank	Time	Rank
Brent Hayden	50 m freestyle	22.34	17	did not advance			
Brent Hayden	100 m freestyle	48.75	11 Q	48.30	4 Q	47.95	2nd place, silver medalist(s)
Chad Bobrosky	200 m freestyle	1:49.01	27	did not advance			
Ryan Cochrane	400 m freestyle	3:46.88	8 Q			3:45.17	5
Ryan Cochrane	800 m freestyle	7:45.57	3 Q			7:41.86	2nd place, silver medalist(s)
Ryan Cochrane	1500 m freestyle	14:55.86	5 Q			14:44.46	Silver medal
Charles Francis	50 m backstroke	25.43	16 Q	25.56	16	did not advance	
Charles Francis	100 m backstroke	54.68	22	did not advance			
Tobias Oriwol	100 m backstroke	55.27	32	did not advance			
Tobias Oriwol	200 m backstroke	1:58.19	10 Q	1:59.45	14	did not advance	
Matt Hawes	200 m backstroke	1:58.84	19	did not advance			
Andrew Dickens	50 m breaststroke	28.19	23	did not advance			
Andrew Dickens	100 m breaststroke	1:01.18	18	did not advance			
Andrew Dickens	200 m breaststroke	2:14.36	27	did not advance			
Mike Brown	200 m breaststroke	2:11.51	7 Q	2:11.63	9	did not advance	
Joe Bartoch	50 m butterfly	24.29	26	did not advance			
Joe Bartoch	100 m butterfly	52.90	21	did not advance			
Stefan Hirniak	200 m butterfly	1:58.72	25	did not advance			
Andrew Ford	200 m individual medley	2:00.92	21	did not advance			
Andrew Ford	400 m individual medley	4:20.87	21			did not advance	
Brent Hayden; Dominique Massie-Martel; Colin Russell; Blake Worsley	4×100 m freestyle relay	3:17.35	12			did not advance	
Chad Bobrosky; Colin Russell; Blake Worsley; Stefan Hirniak	4×200 m freestyle relay	7:13.73	10			did not advance	
Charles Francis; Andrew Dickens; Joseph Bartoch; Brent Hayden	4×100 m medley relay	3:35.36	6 Q			3:36.80	7

Women

Athlete	Event	Heats		Semifinals		Final	
Athlete	Event	Time	Rank	Time	Rank	Time	Rank
Chantal Vanlandegham	50 m freestyle	25.05	5 Q	25.23	14	did not advance	
Chantal Vanlandegham	100 m freestyle	55.07	21	did not advance			
Victoria Poon	50 m freestyle	25.24	14 Q	25.26	15	did not advance	
Victoria Poon	100 m freestyle	54.74	13 Q	54.82	12	did not advance	
Julia Wilkinson	50 m backstroke	28.62	12 Q	28.10	5 Q	28.09	6
Julia Wilkinson	100 m backstroke	1:00.82	11 Q	1:00.35	13	did not advance	
Julia Wilkinson	200 m medley	2:13.16	10 Q	2:11.92	8 Q	2:16.18	8
Samantha Cheverton	200 m freestyle	1:58.83	18	did not advance			
Samantha Cheverton	400 m freestyle	4:09.81	16			did not advance	
Barbara Jardin	200 m freestyle	1:58.26	12 Q	1:58.18	13	did not advance	
Barbara Jardin	400 m freestyle	4:08.81	13			did not advance	
Savannah King	800 m freestyle	8:41.93	18			did not advance	
Savannah King	1500 m freestyle	16:35.67	20			did not advance	
Sinead Russell	50 m backstroke	28.87	17	did not advance			
Sinead Russell	100 m backstroke	59.80	2 Q	59.68	5 Q	1:00.20	8
Sinead Russell	200 m backstroke	2:08.92	6 Q	2:08.80	9	did not advance	
Geneviève Cantin	200 m backstroke	2:11.09	16 Q	2:12.12	16	did not advance	
Tianna Rissling	100 m breaststroke	1:09.29	21	did not advance			
Jillian Tyler	50 m breaststroke	did not start					
Jillian Tyler	100 m breaststroke	1:07.67	5 Q	1:07.28	6 Q	1:07.64	7
Martha McCabe	200 m breaststroke	2:27.16	8 Q	2:24.86	6 Q	2:24.81	3rd place, bronze medalist(s)
Annamay Pierse	200 m breaststroke	2:27.14	7 Q	2:24.73	4 Q	2:27.00	8
Katerine Savard	50 m butterfly	26.87	18	did not advance			
Katerine Savard	100 m butterfly	58.59	12 Q	58.07	9	did not advance	
Katerine Savard	200 m butterfly	2:09.41	17	did not advance			
Audrey Lacroix	100 m butterfly	59.02	20	did not advance			
Audrey Lacroix	200 m butterfly	2:08.88	12 Q	2:08.70	12	did not advance	
Erica Morningstar	200 m individual medley	2:13.71	13 Q	2:12.67	12	did not advance	
Stephanie Horner	400 m individual medley	4:44.85	17			did not advance	
Alexa Komarnycky	400 m individual medley	4:38.82	9			did not advance	
Victoria Poon; Genevieve Saumur; Chantal Vanlandegham; Julia Wilkinson; Erica Morningstar*	4×100 m freestyle relay	3:38.80	6 Q			3:38.42	6
Samantha Cheverton; Barbara Jardin; Brittany MacLean; Julia Wilkinson	4×200 m freestyle relay	7:52.05	2 Q			7:53.62	7
Sinead Russell; Jillian Tyler; Katerine Savard; Julia Wilkinson; Chantal Vanlandegham*	4×100 m medley relay	4:00.72	7 Q			DSQ	

- * raced in heats only

== Synchronized swimming ==
Canada will send a team of 12 synchronized swimmers.

Women

Athlete	Event	Preliminary		Final	
Athlete	Event	Points	Rank	Points	Rank
Marie-Pier Boudreau Gagnon	Solo technical routine	93.600	4 Q	94.500	4
Marie-Pier Boudreau Gagnon	Solo free routine	94.490	4 Q	94.910	4
Élise Marcotte; Marie-Pier Boudreau Gagnon	Duet technical routine	93.900	4 Q	94.100	4
Élise Marcotte; Marie-Pier Boudreau Gagnon	Duet free routine	94.100	4 Q	94.950	4
Marie-Pier Boudreau Gagnon; Jo-Annie Fortin; Chloé Isaac; Stéphanie Leclair; Tracy Little; Élise Marcotte; Karine Thomas; Valerie Welsh	Team technical routine	94.000	4 Q	94.400	4
Stéphanie Durocher; Jo-Annie Fortin; Chloé Isaac; Stéphanie Leclair; Tracy Little; Élise Marcotte; Karine Thomas; Valerie Welsh	Team free routine	95.280	4 Q	95.490	4
Geneviève Bélanger; Marie-Pier Boudreau Gagnon; Stéphanie Durocher; Jo-Annie Fortin; Chloé Isaac; Stéphanie Leclair; Tracy Little; Élise Marcotte; Karine Thomas; Valerie Welsh	Free routine combination	95.250	4 Q	96.150	Bronze medal

Reserves

- Gabrielle Cardinal
- Erin Willson

== Water polo ==
=== Men ===
Canada's men's team qualified by defeating Brazil and Argentina in a qualifier in January 2011 in Victoria, British Columbia. Canada's men's team finished an all-time high of eighth place at the previous championships in Rome, Italy. For these championships, Canada has been grouped with Brazil, Japan and defending bronze medalist Croatia. The team was announced on July 8, 2011. The team ended up finishing in tenth place.

Team

- Robin Randall – Captain
- Constantine Kudaba
- Omar Touni
- Nicholas Bicari
- Justin Beaconsfield
- Scott Robinson
- John Conway
- Kevin Graham
- Devon Diggle
- Dusko Dakic
- Oliver Vikalo
- Jared McElroy
- Dusan Aleksic

==== Group C ====
Team	Pld	W	D	L	GF	GA	GD	Pts
Croatia	3	3	0	0	43	16	+27	6
Canada	3	2	0	1	28	25	+3	4
Japan	3	1	0	2	25	40	–15	2
Brazil	3	0	0	3	25	40	–15	0

July 18, 2011; 17:00	Report	Japan	5–11	Canada	Shanghai Oriental Sports Center, Shanghai; Attendance: 700; Referees: Williams (NZL), Alexandrescu (ROU)
July 18, 2011; 17:00	Report	Score by quarters: 1–3, 2–2, 0–3, 2–3			Shanghai Oriental Sports Center, Shanghai; Attendance: 700; Referees: Williams (NZL), Alexandrescu (ROU)
July 18, 2011; 17:00	Report	five players 1	Goals	Graham 5	Shanghai Oriental Sports Center, Shanghai; Attendance: 700; Referees: Williams (NZL), Alexandrescu (ROU)

July 20, 2011; 10:50	Report	Canada	4–11	Croatia	Shanghai Oriental Sports Center, Shanghai; Attendance: 300; Referees: Borrell (ESP), Williams (NZL)
July 20, 2011; 10:50	Report	Score by quarters: 1–3, 3–3, 0–3, 0–2			Shanghai Oriental Sports Center, Shanghai; Attendance: 300; Referees: Borrell (ESP), Williams (NZL)
July 20, 2011; 10:50	Report	four players 1	Goals	Dobud 4	Shanghai Oriental Sports Center, Shanghai; Attendance: 300; Referees: Borrell (ESP), Williams (NZL)

July 22, 2011; 9:30	Report	Brazil	9–13	Canada	Shanghai Oriental Sports Center, Shanghai; Attendance: 400; Referees: Brgulian (MNE), Flahive (AUS)
July 22, 2011; 9:30	Report	Score by quarters: 1–2, 1–4, 3–4, 4–3			Shanghai Oriental Sports Center, Shanghai; Attendance: 400; Referees: Brgulian (MNE), Flahive (AUS)
July 22, 2011; 9:30	Report	Guimaraes 3	Goals	Diggle 5	Shanghai Oriental Sports Center, Shanghai; Attendance: 400; Referees: Brgulian (MNE), Flahive (AUS)

==== Playoff round ====
July 24, 2011; 16:50	Report	Canada	4–17	United States	Shanghai Oriental Sports Center, Shanghai; Attendance: 800; Referees: Ciric (SRB), Korzyna (POL)
July 24, 2011; 16:50	Report	Score by quarters: 2–5, 0–6, 2–4, 0–2			Shanghai Oriental Sports Center, Shanghai; Attendance: 800; Referees: Ciric (SRB), Korzyna (POL)
July 24, 2011; 16:50	Report	Diggle 2	Goals	four players 3	Shanghai Oriental Sports Center, Shanghai; Attendance: 800; Referees: Ciric (SRB), Korzyna (POL)

==== Classification 9–12 ====
July 26, 2011; 11:20	Report	Romania	8–12	Canada	Shanghai Oriental Sports Center, Shanghai; Attendance: 350; Referees: Peris (CRO), Williams (NZL)
July 26, 2011; 11:20	Report	Score by quarters: 2–2, 2–4, 3–3, 1–3			Shanghai Oriental Sports Center, Shanghai; Attendance: 350; Referees: Peris (CRO), Williams (NZL)
July 26, 2011; 11:20	Report	Radu, Negrean 3	Goals	Boyd 4	Shanghai Oriental Sports Center, Shanghai; Attendance: 350; Referees: Peris (CRO), Williams (NZL)

==== Ninth place game ====
July 28, 2011; 10:50	Report	Canada	6–8	Australia	Shanghai Oriental Sports Center, Shanghai; Attendance: 300; Referees: Brgulian (MNE), Ni (CHN)
July 28, 2011; 10:50	Report	Score by quarters: 2–0, 1–2, 2–3, 1–3			Shanghai Oriental Sports Center, Shanghai; Attendance: 300; Referees: Brgulian (MNE), Ni (CHN)
July 28, 2011; 10:50	Report	Graham 3	Goals	Younger 2	Shanghai Oriental Sports Center, Shanghai; Attendance: 300; Referees: Brgulian (MNE), Ni (CHN)

=== Women ===
Canada's women's team qualified by finishing in top two teams at the 2010 World League who had not yet qualified. Canada's women's team finished with the silver medals and second position at the previous championships in Rome, Italy. For these championships, Canada has been grouped with Australia, New Zealand and Uzbekistan. Canada's final roster includes eighteen athletes. The team was announced on July 8, 2011. The team finished in eight place.

Team

- Krystina Alogbo – Captain
- Joëlle Békhazi
- Tara Campbell
- Emily Csikos
- Monika Eggens
- Whitney Genoway
- Marissa Janssens
- Katrina Monton
- Dominique Perreault
- Marina Radu
- Rachel Riddell
- Christine Robinson
- Stephanie Valin
- Anna Yelizarova

==== Group B ====
Team	Pld	W	D	L	GF	GA	GD	Pts
Canada	3	3	0	0	43	17	+26	6
Australia	3	2	0	1	46	16	+30	4
New Zealand	3	1	0	2	27	29	−2	2
Uzbekistan	3	0	0	3	14	68	−54	0

July 17, 2011; 12:10	Report	Australia	7–10	Canada	Shanghai Oriental Sports Center, Shanghai; Attendance: 500; Referees: Stavridis (GRE); Bock (GER)
July 17, 2011; 12:10	Report	Score by quarters: 0–2, 2–3, 2–3, 3–2			Shanghai Oriental Sports Center, Shanghai; Attendance: 500; Referees: Stavridis (GRE); Bock (GER)
July 17, 2011; 12:10	Report	Webster 2	Goals	five players 2	Shanghai Oriental Sports Center, Shanghai; Attendance: 500; Referees: Stavridis (GRE); Bock (GER)

July 19, 2011; 09:30	Report	Uzbekistan	6–22	Canada	Shanghai Oriental Sports Center, Shanghai; Attendance: 450; Referees: Menendez (CUB), Makita (JPN)
July 19, 2011; 09:30	Report	Score by quarters: 2–6, 1–6, 1–7, 2–3			Shanghai Oriental Sports Center, Shanghai; Attendance: 450; Referees: Menendez (CUB), Makita (JPN)
July 19, 2011; 09:30	Report	Sarancha 2	Goals	Alogbo 5	Shanghai Oriental Sports Center, Shanghai; Attendance: 450; Referees: Menendez (CUB), Makita (JPN)

July 21, 2011; 19:40	Report	New Zealand	4–11	Canada	Shanghai Oriental Sports Center, Shanghai; Attendance: 500; Referees: Naumov (RUS), Alexandrescu (ROU)
July 21, 2011; 19:40	Report	Score by quarters: 2–3, 1–4, 1–2, 0–2			Shanghai Oriental Sports Center, Shanghai; Attendance: 500; Referees: Naumov (RUS), Alexandrescu (ROU)
July 21, 2011; 19:40	Report	four players 1	Goals	Csikos 4	Shanghai Oriental Sports Center, Shanghai; Attendance: 500; Referees: Naumov (RUS), Alexandrescu (ROU)

==== Quarterfinals ====
July 25, 2011; 21:00	Report	Canada	7–9	China	Shanghai Oriental Sports Center, Shanghai; Attendance: 850; Referees: Stavridis (GRE), Caputi (ITA)
July 25, 2011; 21:00	Report	Score by quarters: 2–3, 2–2, 3–3, 0–1			Shanghai Oriental Sports Center, Shanghai; Attendance: 850; Referees: Stavridis (GRE), Caputi (ITA)
July 25, 2011; 21:00	Report	Csikos 3	Goals	Sun Yating 3	Shanghai Oriental Sports Center, Shanghai; Attendance: 850; Referees: Stavridis (GRE), Caputi (ITA)

==== Classification 5–8 ====
July 27, 2011; 12:10	Report	United States	8–4	Canada	Shanghai Oriental Sports Center, Shanghai; Attendance: 250; Referees: Naumov (RUS), Menendez (CUB)
July 27, 2011; 12:10	Report	Score by quarters: 2–2, 2–0, 2–1, 2–1			Shanghai Oriental Sports Center, Shanghai; Attendance: 250; Referees: Naumov (RUS), Menendez (CUB)
July 27, 2011; 12:10	Report	Petri 2	Goals	Csikos 2	Shanghai Oriental Sports Center, Shanghai; Attendance: 250; Referees: Naumov (RUS), Menendez (CUB)

==== Seventh place game ====
July 29, 2011; 09:30	Report	Canada	7–8	Netherlands	Shanghai Oriental Sports Center, Shanghai; Attendance: 200; Referees: Koryzna (POL), Pinker (RSA)
July 29, 2011; 09:30	Report	Score by quarters: 2–0, 1–3, 3–4, 1–1			Shanghai Oriental Sports Center, Shanghai; Attendance: 200; Referees: Koryzna (POL), Pinker (RSA)
July 29, 2011; 09:30	Report	Csikos 3	Goals	three players 2	Shanghai Oriental Sports Center, Shanghai; Attendance: 200; Referees: Koryzna (POL), Pinker (RSA)
