= Synchronized swimming at the 2011 Pan American Games =

- Venue: Scotiabank Aquatics Center
- Dates: October 18 – October 21
- Competitors: 69 from 10 nations

Synchronized swimming competitions at the 2011 Pan American Games in Guadalajara were held from October 18 to October 21, at the Scotiabank Aquatics Center. The winning team, Canada, qualified its country to compete at the 2012 Summer Olympics in London, Great Britain.

== Medal summary ==
=== Medal table ===
| Rank | Nation | Gold | Silver | Bronze | Total |
|---|---|---|---|---|---|
| 1 | Canada | 2 | 0 | 0 | 2 |
| 2 | United States | 0 | 2 | 0 | 2 |
| 3 | Brazil | 0 | 0 | 2 | 2 |
| Totals (3 entries) | | 2 | 2 | 2 | 6 |

=== Events ===
| Event | Gold | Silver | Bronze |
|---|---|---|---|
| Duet | Canada; Élise Marcotte; Marie-Pier Boudreau Gagnon | United States; Mary Killman; Mariya Koroleva | Brazil; Lara Teixeira; Nayara Figueira |
| Team | Canada; Marie-Pier Boudreau Gagnon; Jo-Annie Fortin; Chloé Isaac; Stéphanie Leclair; Tracy Little; Élise Marcotte; Karine Thomas; Valerie Welsh | United States; Morgan Fuller; Megan Hansley; Mary Killman; Mariya Koroleva; Michelle Moore; Leah Pinette; Lyssa Wallace; Alison Williams | Brazil; Giovana Stephan; Joseane Costa; Lara Teixeira; Lorena Molinos; Maria Bruno; Maria Pereira; Nayara Figueira; Pamela Nogueira |

== Schedule ==
All times are Central Daylight time (UTC-5).

| Day | Date | Start | Finish | Event | Phase |
|---|---|---|---|---|---|
| Day 5 | Tuesday, October 18 | 14:00 | 17:00 | Duet | Technical routine |
| Day 6 | Wednesday, October 19 | 14:00 | 17:00 | Team | Technical routine |
| Day 7 | Thursday, October 20 | 14:00 | 17:00 | Duet | Free routine |
| Day 8 | Friday, October 21 | 14:00 | 17:00 | Team | Free routine |

== Qualifying Criteria ==
Eight teams and twelve duets will compete. The United States, Canada and hosts Mexico get automatic berths, while the remaining nations had to qualify through regional events.

=== Team ===
| Event | Date | Location | Vacancies | Qualified |
|---|---|---|---|---|
| Host Nation | – | – | 1 | Mexico |
| Zone 1 | March 26–29, 2010 | (Colombia) Medellín | 3 | Brazil; Colombia; Argentina |
| Zone 2 | July 25–31, 2010 | (Puerto Rico) Mayagüez | 1 | Aruba; ~~Puerto Rico~~ |
| Zone 3 | – | – | 1 | United States |
| Zone 4 | – | – | 1 | Canada |
| TOTAL | | | 7 | |

=== Duet ===
| Event | Date | Location | Vacancies | Qualified |
|---|---|---|---|---|
| Host Nation | – | – | 1 | Mexico |
| Zone 1 | March 26–29, 2010 | (Colombia) Medellín | 5 | Brazil; Colombia; Argentina; Venezuela; Uruguay |
| Zone 2 | July 25–31, 2010 | (Puerto Rico) Mayagüez | 2 | ~~Dominican Republic~~; Aruba; ~~Puerto Rico~~; Costa Rica |
| Zone 3 | – | – | 1 | United States |
| Zone 4 | – | – | 1 | Canada |
| TOTAL | | | 10 | |
