= 2010 FINA Synchronised Swimming World Cup =

Swimming competition

The 12th FINA Synchronised Swimming World Cup was held September 16–19, 2010 in Changshu, China. It featured swimmers from 23 nations, swimming in four events: Solo, Duet, Team and Free Combination.

== Participating nations ==
23 nations swam at the 2010 Synchronized Swimming World Cup:

- Argentina
- Australia
- Austria
- Brazil
- Canada
- China
- Czech Republic
- Finland
- Germany
- Great Britain
- Italy
- Japan
- Kazakhstan
- Macao
- Malaysia
- Netherlands
- Russia
- Singapore
- South Korea
- Thailand
- Turkey
- Ukraine
- USA

== Results ==
Event	Gold		Silver		Bronze	
Solo	Natalia Ishchenko; Russia	98.250	Shi Xin; China	95.500	Marie-Pier Boudreau Gagnon; Canada	95.250
Duet	Jiang Wenwen; Jiang Tingting; China	96.650	Marie-Pier Boudreau Gagnon; Chloé Isaac; Canada	94.750	Yukiko Inui; Chisa Kobayashi; Japan	93.300
Team	Natalia Ishchenko; Elvira Khasyanova; Svetlana Kolesnichenko; Daria Korobova; Aleksandra Patskevich; Alla Shishkina; Anzhelika Timanina; Aleksandra Zueva; Russia	98.150	Chang Si; Huang Xuechen; Jiang Wenwen; Jiang Tingting; Liu Ou; Luo Xi; Sun Wenyan; Wu Yiwen; China	96.500	Jo-Annie Fortin; Chloe Isaac; Eve Lamoureux; Tracy Little; Elise Marcotte; Valerie Welsh; Erin Willson; Stephanie Leclair; Canada	95.600
Free; Combination	Natalia Ishchenko; Elvira Khasyanova; Svetlana Kolesnichenko; Daria Korobova; Olga Kuzhela; Aleksandra Patskevich; Alla Shishkina; Elizaveta Stepanova; Anzhelika Timanina; Aleksandra Zueva; Russia	98.300	Chang Si; Huang Xuechen; Jiang Wenwen; Jiang Tingting; Liu Ou; Luo Xi; Sun Wenyan; Wu Yiwen; Shi Xin; Yu Lele; China	97.200	Marie-Pier Boudreau-Gagnon; Camille Bowness; Jo-Annie Fortin; Chloe Isaac; Eve Lamoureux; Tracy Little; Elise Marcotte; Valerie Welsh; Erin Willson; Stephanie Leclair; Canada	96.000

== Final standings ==
Place	Nation	Points
1	China	385.850
2	Canada	381.600
3	Ukraine	370.300
4	Brazil	346.900
5	Russia	294.700
6	Japan	281.400
7	United States	272.850
8	(United Kingdom) Great Britain	263.000
9	Netherlands	252.250
10	South Korea	176.650
11	Czech Republic	174.600
12	Austria	169.150
13	Kazakhstan	165.150
14	Argentina	159.950
15	Australia	155.950
16	Malaysia	153.750
17	Finland	140.600
18	Thailand	140.250
19	(Macau) Macao	134.350
20	Italy	91.550
21	Germany	78.500
22	Turkey	74.200
23	Singapore	67.700
