= Synchronized swimming at the 2011 Pan American Games – Women's duet =

Women's duet at the 2011 Pan American Games
- Venue: Scotiabank Aquatics Center
- Dates: October 18 – October 20
- Competitors: 20 from 10 nations

Medalists
Gold medal	Élise Marcotte; Marie-Pier Boudreau	Canada
Silver medal	Mary Christene Killman; Mariya Koroleva	United States
Bronze medal	Lara Teixeira; Nayara Figueira	Brazil

The women's duet competition of the synchronized swimming events at the 2011 Pan American Games in Guadalajara were held from October 18 to October 20, at the Scotiabank Aquatics Center. The defending Pan American Champion is the duet from the United States.

All ten duets competed in both rounds of the competition. The first round consisted of a technical, while the second round was a free routine. The winner was the duet with the highest combined score. The technical routine consisted of ten required elements, which had to be completed in order and within a time of between 2 minutes 5 seconds and 2 minutes 35 seconds. The free routine had no restrictions other than time; this routine had to last between 3 minutes 15 seconds and 3 minutes 45 seconds.

With the win the Canadian Duet of Élise Marcotte and Marie-Pier Boudreau Gagnon qualify to compete in the 2012 Summer Olympics in London, Great Britain.

== Schedule ==
All times are Central Standard time (UTC-6).

Date	Start	Round
Tuesday, October 18	14:00	Technical routine
Thursday, October 20	14:00	Free routine

== Results ==
Rank	Country	Athlete	Technical	Free	Total
1	Canada	Élise Marcotte & Marie-Pier Boudreau Gagnon	94.000	94.988	188.988
2	United States	Mary Christene Killman & Mariya Koroleva	90.125	89.338	179.463
3	Brazil	Lara Teixeira & Nayara Figueira	88.500	88.913	177.413
4	Mexico	Isabel Delgado & Nuria Diosdado	87.125	86.538	173.663
5	Colombia	Jennifer Cerquera & Estefanía Álvarez	81.000	80.350	161.350
6	Argentina	Etel Sánchez & Sofía Sánchez	79.375	79.238	158.613
7	Venezuela	Rosamaria Avila & Fredmary Zambrano	75.125	76.200	151.325
8	Aruba	Nikita Pablo & Anouk Eman	73.250	73.125	146.375
9	Costa Rica	Violeta Mitinian & Nadezhda Gomez	69.875	70.638	140.513
10	Uruguay	Sofia Orihuela & Florencia Rodrigo	68.375	69.400	137.775
