= Brazil at the 2015 World Aquatics Championships =

- Flag of Brazil
- World Aquatics code: BRA
- National federation: Confederação Brasileira de Desportos Aquáticos
- Website: www.cbda.org.br

in Kazan, Russia
- Competitors: 83 in 6 sports
- Medals Ranked 13th: Gold 1 Silver 4 Bronze 2 Total 7

World Aquatics Championships appearances (overview)
- 1973; 1975; 1978; 1982; 1986; 1991; 1994; 1998; 2001; 2003; 2005; 2007; 2009; 2011; 2013; 2015; 2017; 2019; 2022; 2023; 2024; 2025

Brazil competed at the 2015 World Aquatics Championships in Kazan, Russia from 24 July to 9 August 2015.

== Medalists ==
Medal	Name	Sport	Event	Date
Gold	Ana Marcela Cunha	Open water swimming	Women's 25 km	August 1
Silver	Ana Marcela Cunha; Allan do Carmo; Diogo Villarinho	Open water swimming	Mixed team	July 30
Silver	Nicholas Santos	Swimming	Men's 50 m butterfly	August 3
Silver	Etiene Medeiros	Swimming	Women's 50 m backstroke	August 6
Silver	Thiago Pereira	Swimming	Men's 200 m individual medley	August 6
Bronze	Ana Marcela Cunha	Open water swimming	Women's 10 km	July 28
Bronze	Bruno Fratus	Swimming	Men's 50 m freestyle	August 8

== Diving ==
Men

Athlete	Event	Preliminaries		Semifinals		Final	
Athlete	Event	Points	Rank	Points	Rank	Points	Rank
César Castro	3 m springboard	419.30	17 Q	430.30	14	Did not advance	
Ian Matos	3 m springboard	403.85	23	Did not advance			
Jackson Rondinelli	10 m platform	318.55	40	Did not advance			
Isaac Souza	10 m platform	352.25	36	Did not advance			
Ian Matos; Luiz Outerelo	3 m synchronized springboard	370.08	=13	—N/a		Did not advance	
Jackson Rondinelli; Isaac Souza	10 m synchronized platform	335.91	19	—N/a		Did not advance	

Women

Athlete	Event	Preliminaries		Semifinals		Final	
Athlete	Event	Points	Rank	Points	Rank	Points	Rank
Luana Lira	1 m springboard	180.35	37	—N/a		Did not advance	
Juliana Veloso	1 m springboard	226.90	25	—N/a		Did not advance	
Luana Lira	3 m springboard	255.05	28	Did not advance			
Juliana Veloso	3 m springboard	213.75	43	Did not advance			
Ingrid Oliveira	10 m platform	291.95	25	Did not advance			
Giovanna Pedroso	10 m platform	301.40	22	Did not advance			
Tammy Takagi; Juliana Veloso	3 m synchronized springboard	228.87	18	—N/a		Did not advance	
Ingrid Oliveira; Giovanna Pedroso	10 m synchronized platform	256.32	15	—N/a		Did not advance	

Mixed

Athlete	Event	Final	
Athlete	Event	Points	Rank
Ian Matos; Juliana Veloso	3 m synchronized springboard	249.60	13
Ingrid Oliveira; Luiz Outerelo	10 m synchronized platform	283.68	12

== High diving ==
Athlete	Event	Points	Rank
Jacqueline Valente	Women's high diving	186.60	8

== Open water swimming ==
Brazil has fielded a team of eight swimmers to compete in the open water marathon.

Men

Athlete	Event	Time	Rank
Samuel de Bona	5 km	55:25.9	14
Victor Colonese	5 km	55:24.4	9
Allan do Carmo	10 km	1:50:23.1	9
Allan do Carmo	25 km	5:06:27.9	16
Diogo Villarinho	10 km	1:50:48.8	21
Diogo Villarinho	25 km	5:11:04.2	18

Women

Athlete	Event	Time	Rank
Carolina Bilich	5 km	1:00:07.2	17
Ana Marcela Cunha	10 km	1:58:26.5	3rd place, bronze medalist(s)
Ana Marcela Cunha	25 km	5:13:47.3	1st place, gold medalist(s)
Betina Lorscheitter	5 km	59:57.8	15
Betina Lorscheitter	25 km	Did not finish	
Poliana Okimoto	10 km	1:58:28.8	6

Mixed

Athlete	Event	Time	Rank
Ana Marcela Cunha; Allan do Carmo; Diogo Villarinho	Team	55:31.2	2nd place, silver medalist(s)

== Swimming ==
Brazilian swimmers have achieved qualifying standards in the following events (up to a maximum of 2 swimmers in each event at the A-standard entry time, and 1 at the B-standard): Swimmers must qualify at the 2015 Maria Lenk Trophy (for pool events) to confirm their places for the Worlds.

Men

Athlete	Event	Heat		Semifinal		Final	
Athlete	Event	Time	Rank	Time	Rank	Time	Rank
Bruno Fratus	50 m freestyle	22.01	5 Q	21.60	3 Q	21.55	3rd place, bronze medalist(s)
César Cielo	50 m freestyle	DNS		Did not advance			
César Cielo	50 m butterfly	23.66	14 Q	23.29	8 Q	23.21	6
Marcelo Chierighini	100 m freestyle	48.92	15 Q	48.37	6 Q	48.27	5
Matheus Santana	100 m freestyle	48.81	12 Q	48.52	9	Did not advance	
João de Lucca	200 m freestyle	1:47.47	14 Q	1:48.23	16	Did not advance	
Nicolas Oliveira	200 m freestyle	1:48.23	23	Did not advance			
Guilherme Guido	50 m backstroke	25.29	=16	Did not advance			
Guilherme Guido	100 m backstroke	53.57	6 Q	53.88	14	Did not advance	
Felipe França Silva	50 m breaststroke	27.10	5 Q	26.87	4 Q	26.87	4
Felipe França Silva	100 m breaststroke	59.56	5 Q	59.89	11	Did not advance	
Felipe França Silva	200 m breaststroke	2:16.13	38	Did not advance			
Felipe Lima	50 m breaststroke	27.37	8 Q	27.50	=12	Did not advance	
Felipe Lima	100 m breaststroke	1:00.26	=14 Q	1:00.19	13	Did not advance	
Nicholas Santos	50 m butterfly	23.41	6 Q	23.05	2 Q	23.09	2nd place, silver medalist(s)
Arthur Mendes	100 m butterfly	52.55	24	Did not advance			
Leonardo de Deus	200 m backstroke	1:57.73	10 Q	1:57.96	13	Did not advance	
Leonardo de Deus	200 m butterfly	1:55.83	5 Q	1:56.02	9	Did not advance	
Thiago Pereira	100 m butterfly	DNS		Did not advance			
Thiago Pereira	200 m individual medley	1:59.18	8 Q	1:57.33	3 Q	1:56.65	2nd place, silver medalist(s)
Thiago Pereira	400 m individual medley	DNS		—N/a		Did not advance	
Henrique Rodrigues	200 m individual medley	1:58.95	6 Q	1:58.45	7 Q	1:58.52	7
Thiago Simon	200 m breaststroke	2:14.28	29	Did not advance			
Thiago Simon	400 m individual medley	DNS		—N/a		Did not advance	
Marcelo Chierighini; Matheus Santana; Bruno Fratus; João de Lucca	4×100 m freestyle relay	3:13.99	2 Q	—N/a		3:13.22	4
Luiz Altamir Melo; João de Lucca; Thiago Pereira; Nicolas Oliveira	4×200 m freestyle relay	7:16.85	15	—N/a		Did not advance	
Guilherme Guido; Felipe Lima; Arthur Mendes; Marcelo Chierighini	4×100 m medley relay	3:34.73	10	—N/a		Did not advance	

Women

Athlete	Event	Heat		Semifinal		Final	
Athlete	Event	Time	Rank	Time	Rank	Time	Rank
Graciele Herrmann	50 m freestyle	25.25	21	Did not advance			
Graciele Herrmann	100 m freestyle	55.80	34	Did not advance			
Larissa Oliveira	100 m freestyle	55.02	19	Did not advance			
Larissa Oliveira	200 m freestyle	2:00.35	27	Did not advance			
Manuella Lyrio	200 m freestyle	1:58.68	16 Q	1:59.28	15	Did not advance	
Manuella Lyrio	400 m freestyle	4:10.57 NR	16	—N/a		Did not advance	
Etiene Medeiros	50 m freestyle	24.97	13 Q	25.03	16	Did not advance	
Etiene Medeiros	50 m backstroke	27.74	2 Q	27.41	2 Q	27.26 AM	2nd place, silver medalist(s)
Etiene Medeiros	100 m backstroke	1:00.33	10 Q	59.97	9	Did not advance	
Jhennifer Conceição	50 m breaststroke	31.44	21	Did not advance			
Jhennifer Conceição	100 m breaststroke	1:10.14	36	Did not advance			
Daiene Dias	100 m butterfly	59.75	31	Did not advance			
Daynara de Paula	50 m butterfly	26.49	16 Q	26.24	13	Did not advance	
Daynara de Paula	100 m butterfly	58.59	18	Did not advance			
Joanna Melo	200 m backstroke	2:12.26	21	Did not advance			
Joanna Melo	200 m butterfly	2:09.77	16 Q	2:09.69	16	Did not advance	
Joanna Melo	200 m individual medley	2:12.74	11 Q	2:12.64	12	Did not advance	
Joanna Melo	400 m individual medley	4:44.40	19	—N/a		Did not advance	
Larissa Oliveira; Graciele Herrmann; Etiene Medeiros; Daynara de Paula	4×100 m freestyle relay	3:40.24	11	—N/a		Did not advance	
Manuella Lyrio; Jéssica Cavalheiro; Joanna Melo; Larissa Oliveira	4×200 m freestyle relay	7:57.15	10	—N/a		Did not advance	
Jhennifer Conceição; Graciele Herrmann; Etiene Medeiros; Larissa Oliveira; Daynara de Paula	4×100 m medley relay	4:03.24	14	—N/a		Did not advance	

Mixed

Athlete	Event	Heat		Final	
Athlete	Event	Time	Rank	Time	Rank
Matheus Santana; Bruno Fratus; Larissa Oliveira; Daynara de Paula; Marcelo Chierighini*	4×100 m freestyle relay	3:27.75	=7 Q	3:25.58	6
Daynara de Paula; Felipe Lima; Daiene Dias; João de Lucca	4×100 m medley relay	3:53.45	9	Did not advance	

== Synchronized swimming ==
Brazil fielded a full squad of eleven synchronized swimmers to compete in each of the following events at the World Championships.

Athlete	Event	Preliminaries		Final	
Athlete	Event	Points	Rank	Points	Rank
Luisa Borges; Maria Eduarda Miccuci	Duet technical routine	81.7065	14	Did not advance	
Luisa Borges; Maria Eduarda Miccuci	Duet free routine	84.2000	12 Q	84.4667	12
Maria Bruno; Maria Clara Coutinho; Beatriz Feres; Branca Feres; Maria Eduarda Miccuci; Lorena Molinos; Pâmela Nogueira; Lara Teixeira	Team technical routine	83.0283	12 Q	82.9372	11
Luisa Borges; Maria Bruno; Beatriz Feres; Branca Feres; Sabrine Lowy; Lorena Molinos; Pâmela Nogueira; Lara Teixeira	Team free routine	85.3333	11 Q	85.2667	11
Maria Bruno; Maria Clara Coutinho; Juliana Damico; Beatriz Feres; Branca Feres; Sabrine Lowy; Lorena Molinos; Pâmela Nogueira; Giovana Stephan; Lara Teixeira	Free routine combination	84.1000	10 Q	84.8000	10

== Water polo ==
=== Men's tournament ===
Team roster

- Vinicius Antonelli
- Jonas Crivella
- Guilherme Gomes
- Ives González
- Paulo Salemi
- Bernardo Gomes
- Adrià Delgado
- Felipe Costa e Silva
- Bernardo Rocha
- Felipe Perrone
- Gustavo Guimarães
- Josip Vrlić
- ~~Thyê Bezerra~~

Group play

Pos	Team	Pld	W	D	L	GF	GA	GD	Pts	Qualification
1	Croatia	3	3	0	0	39	17	+22	6	Advanced to quarterfinals
2	Canada	3	2	0	1	25	20	+5	4	Advanced to playoffs
3	Brazil	3	0	1	2	24	29	−5	1	Advanced to playoffs
4	China	3	0	1	2	12	34	−22	1	

Source: SportResult.com
Rules for classification: 1) points; 2) head-to-head points; 3) head-to-head goal difference; 4) head-to-head number of goals scored; 5) goal difference.

27 July 2015; 10:50	Report	Brazil	9–9	China	Kazan; Attendance: 700; Referees: Stanko Ivanovski (MNE), Vojin Putniković (SRB)
27 July 2015; 10:50	Report	Score by quarters: 3–4, 2–1, 3–4, 1–0			Kazan; Attendance: 700; Referees: Stanko Ivanovski (MNE), Vojin Putniković (SRB)
27 July 2015; 10:50	Report	Perrone 4	Goals	Dong Tao, Zhang Chufeng 3	Kazan; Attendance: 700; Referees: Stanko Ivanovski (MNE), Vojin Putniković (SRB)

29 July 2015; 21:30	Report	Croatia	10–9	Brazil	Kazan; Attendance: 230; Referees: Mark Koganov (AZE), Daniel Flahive (AUS)
29 July 2015; 21:30	Report	Score by quarters: 4–2, 4–2, 1–2, 1–3			Kazan; Attendance: 230; Referees: Mark Koganov (AZE), Daniel Flahive (AUS)
29 July 2015; 21:30	Report	Sukno 3	Goals	three players 2	Kazan; Attendance: 230; Referees: Mark Koganov (AZE), Daniel Flahive (AUS)

31 July 2015; 20:10	Report	Brazil	6–10	Canada	Kazan; Attendance: 230; Referees: Mark Koganov (AZE), György Kun (HUN)
31 July 2015; 20:10	Report	Score by quarters: 0–3, 3–3, 2–3, 1–1			Kazan; Attendance: 230; Referees: Mark Koganov (AZE), György Kun (HUN)
31 July 2015; 20:10	Report	Silva 2	Goals	Boyd, McElroy 2	Kazan; Attendance: 230; Referees: Mark Koganov (AZE), György Kun (HUN)

Playoffs

2 August 2015; 17:30	Report	Brazil	3–7	United States	Kazan; Attendance: 2,090; Referees: Boris Margeta (SLO), Adrian Alexandrescu (ROU)
2 August 2015; 17:30	Report	Score by quarters: 0–2, 1–1, 1–1, 1–3			Kazan; Attendance: 2,090; Referees: Boris Margeta (SLO), Adrian Alexandrescu (ROU)
2 August 2015; 17:30	Report	three players 1	Goals	Mann 3	Kazan; Attendance: 2,090; Referees: Boris Margeta (SLO), Adrian Alexandrescu (ROU)

9th–12th place semifinals

4 August 2015; 13:30	Report	Brazil	16–5	South Africa	Kazan; Attendance: 213; Referees: Ni Shi Wei (CHN), Hatem Gaber (EGY)
4 August 2015; 13:30	Report	Score by quarters: 7–3, 2–2, 3–0, 4–0			Kazan; Attendance: 213; Referees: Ni Shi Wei (CHN), Hatem Gaber (EGY)
4 August 2015; 13:30	Report	Vrlic 5	Goals	five players 1	Kazan; Attendance: 213; Referees: Ni Shi Wei (CHN), Hatem Gaber (EGY)

Ninth place game

6 August 2015; 12:10	Report	Canada	7–7 (PSO)	Brazil	Kazan; Attendance: 308; Referees: Mark Koganov (AZE), Viktor Salnichenko (KAZ)
6 August 2015; 12:10	Report	Score by quarters: 2–2, 1–1, 2–3, 2–1 PSO: 5–3			Kazan; Attendance: 308; Referees: Mark Koganov (AZE), Viktor Salnichenko (KAZ)
6 August 2015; 12:10	Report	Conway, Kubada 2	Goals	Delgado 3	Kazan; Attendance: 308; Referees: Mark Koganov (AZE), Viktor Salnichenko (KAZ)

=== Women's tournament ===
Team roster

- Tess Oliveira
- Diana Abla
- Marina Zablith
- Mariana Duarte
- Lucianne Barroncas
- Izabella Chiappini
- Amanda Oliveira
- Luiza Carvalho
- Melani Dias
- Viviane Bahia
- Lorena Borges
- Gabriela Mantellato
- Victória Chamorro

Group play

Pos	Team	Pld	W	D	L	GF	GA	GD	Pts	Qualification
1	Italy	3	3	0	0	40	18	+22	6	Advanced to quarterfinals
2	United States	3	2	0	1	39	14	+25	4	Advanced to playoffs
3	Brazil	3	1	0	2	19	36	−17	2	Advanced to playoffs
4	Japan	3	0	0	3	13	43	−30	0	

Source: SportResult.com
Rules for classification: 1) points; 2) head-to-head points; 3) head-to-head goal difference; 4) head-to-head number of goals scored; 5) goal difference.

26 July 2015; 17:30	Report	Brazil	2–13	United States	Kazan; Attendance: 1,880; Referees: Dion Willis (RSA), Viktor Salnichenko (KAZ)
26 July 2015; 17:30	Report	Score by quarters: 0–6, 0–3, 1–2, 1–2			Kazan; Attendance: 1,880; Referees: Dion Willis (RSA), Viktor Salnichenko (KAZ)
26 July 2015; 17:30	Report	Chiappini, Oliveira 1	Goals	Steffens 3	Kazan; Attendance: 1,880; Referees: Dion Willis (RSA), Viktor Salnichenko (KAZ)

28 July 2015; 13:30	Report	Brazil	11–8	Japan	Kazan; Attendance: 543; Referees: Stephane Roy (CAN), Viktor Salnichenko (KAZ)
28 July 2015; 13:30	Report	Score by quarters: 4–2, 2–1, 4–3, 1–2			Kazan; Attendance: 543; Referees: Stephane Roy (CAN), Viktor Salnichenko (KAZ)
28 July 2015; 13:30	Report	Chiappini 5	Goals	Nakano 3	Kazan; Attendance: 543; Referees: Stephane Roy (CAN), Viktor Salnichenko (KAZ)

30 July 2015; 09:30	Report	Brazil	6–15	Italy	Kazan; Attendance: 617; Referees: Cory Williams (NZL), Viktor Salnichenko (KAZ)
30 July 2015; 09:30	Report	Score by quarters: 0–3, 1–5, 3–3, 2–4			Kazan; Attendance: 617; Referees: Cory Williams (NZL), Viktor Salnichenko (KAZ)
30 July 2015; 09:30	Report	Oliveira 4	Goals	Bianconi, Radicchi 3	Kazan; Attendance: 617; Referees: Cory Williams (NZL), Viktor Salnichenko (KAZ)

Playoffs

1 August 2015; 20:10	Report	Brazil	8–10	China	Kazan; Attendance: 350; Referees: Stephane Roy (CAN), Dion Willis (RSA)
1 August 2015; 20:10	Report	Score by quarters: 1–2, 1–3, 4–3, 2–2			Kazan; Attendance: 350; Referees: Stephane Roy (CAN), Dion Willis (RSA)
1 August 2015; 20:10	Report	Chiappini 5	Goals	three players 2	Kazan; Attendance: 350; Referees: Stephane Roy (CAN), Dion Willis (RSA)

9th–12th place semifinals

3 August 2015; 13:30	Report	Kazakhstan	5–10	Brazil	Kazan; Attendance: 155; Referees: Anne Grandin (FRA), Ni Shi Wei (CHN)
3 August 2015; 13:30	Report	Score by quarters: 1–2, 0–4, 2–4, 2–0			Kazan; Attendance: 155; Referees: Anne Grandin (FRA), Ni Shi Wei (CHN)
3 August 2015; 13:30	Report	Mirshina 3	Goals	Chiappini 3	Kazan; Attendance: 155; Referees: Anne Grandin (FRA), Ni Shi Wei (CHN)

Ninth place game

5 August 2015; 12:10	Report	Hungary	22–7	Brazil	Kazan; Attendance: 205; Referees: Ursula Wengenroth (SUI), Dion Willis (RSA)
5 August 2015; 12:10	Report	Score by quarters: 5–2, 6–2, 6–0, 5–3			Kazan; Attendance: 205; Referees: Ursula Wengenroth (SUI), Dion Willis (RSA)
5 August 2015; 12:10	Report	Keszthelyi 5	Goals	Chiappini, Zablith 2	Kazan; Attendance: 205; Referees: Ursula Wengenroth (SUI), Dion Willis (RSA)
