= Synchronized swimming at the 2010 South American Games – Team Free =

The women's team event at the 2010 South American Games included the technical routine on March 26, at 22:15, and the free routine on March 29, at 20:10.

== Medalists ==
Gold	Silver	Bronze
Beatriz Feres; Branca Feres; Nayara Figueira; Michelle Frota; Lorena Molinos; Pamela Nogueira; Giovanna Stephan; Lara Teixeira; Brazil	Asly Alegria; Mónica Arango; Laura Arango; Jennifer Cerquera; Ingrid Cubillos; Laura Urrego; Zully Pérez; Maritza Aguilar; Colombia	Maria Florencia Arce; Irina Bandurek; Delfina Brunatto; Lucia Paula Diaz; Brenda Moller; Etel Sánchez; Sofía Sánchez; Lucina Simon; Argentina

== Results ==
=== Technical routine ===
Rank	Athlete	EX	OI	Pen.	50% Points
1	Brazil; Beatriz Feres; Branca Feres; Nayara Figueira; Michelle Frota; Lorena Molinos; Pamela Nogueira; Giovanna Stephan; Lara Teixeira	42.333	44.167		43.250
2	Colombia; Asly Alegria; Mónica Arango; Laura Arango; Jennifer Cerquera; Ingrid Cubillos; Laura Urrego; Zully Pérez; Maritza Aguilar	41.667	43.000		42.334
3	Argentina; Maria Florencia Arce; Irina Bandurek; Delfina Brunatto; Lucia Paula Diaz; Brenda Moller; Etel Sánchez; Sofía Sánchez; Lucina Simon	39.167	39.000		39.084
4	Aruba; Anouk Eman; Saskia Franken; Amanda Maduro; Nikita Pablo; Jitva Sarman; Nathifa Sarman; Nathania Taylor; Kiara van Trikt	32.167	34.167	–2.0	33.167

=== Free routine ===
Rank	Athlete	TM	AI	50% Points
1	Brazil; Beatriz Feres; Branca Feres; Nayara Figueira; Michelle Frota; Lorena Molinos; Pamela Nogueira; Giovanna Stephan; Lara Teixeira	44.000	44.667	44.334
2	Colombia; Asly Alegria; Mónica Arango; Laura Arango; Jennifer Cerquera; Ingrid Cubillos; Laura Urrego; Zully Pérez; Maritza Aguilar	44.167	44.333	44.250
3	Argentina; Maria Florencia Arce; Irina Bandurek; Delfina Brunatto; Lucia Paula Diaz; Brenda Moller; Etel Sánchez; Sofía Sánchez; Lucina Simon	39.500	40.333	39.917
4	Aruba; Anouk Eman; Saskia Franken; Amanda Maduro; Nikita Pablo; Jitva Sarman; Nathifa Sarman; Nathania Taylor; Kiara van Trikt	35.500	37.000	36.250

=== Summary ===
Rank	Athlete	TR	FR	Total points
1st place, gold medalist(s)	Brazil; Beatriz Feres; Branca Feres; Nayara Figueira; Michelle Frota; Lorena Molinos; Pamela Nogueira; Giovanna Stephan; Lara Teixeira	43.250	44.334	87.584
2nd place, silver medalist(s)	Colombia; Asly Alegria; Mónica Arango; Laura Arango; Jennifer Cerquera; Ingrid Cubillos; Laura Urrego; Zully Pérez; Maritza Aguilar	42.334	44.250	86.584
3rd place, bronze medalist(s)	Argentina; Maria Florencia Arce; Irina Bandurek; Delfina Brunatto; Lucia Paula Diaz; Brenda Moller; Etel Sánchez; Sofía Sánchez; Lucina Simon	39.084	39.917	79.001
4	Aruba; Anouk Eman; Saskia Franken; Amanda Maduro; Nikita Pablo; Jitva Sarman; Nathifa Sarman; Nathania Taylor; Kiara van Trikt	33.167	36.250	69.417
