= Synchronised swimming at the 2009 World Aquatics Championships – Free routine combination =

The free routine combination synchronised swimming competition at the 2009 World Aquatics Championships was held in Rome, Italy from July 17 to August 2, 2009. The competition was won by Spain, who performed a routine to the Led Zeppelin song "Stairway to Heaven". The gold medal was the first world championship title in the history of the Spanish synchronised swimming team.

== Medalist ==
Gold	Silver	Bronze
Spain; Alba Cabello; Ona Carbonell; Raquel Corral; Margalida Crespí; Andrea Fuentes; Thaïs Henríquez; Paula Klamburg; Gemma Mengual; Gisela Morón; Irina Rodríguez	China; Huang Xuechen; Jiang Tingting; Jiang Wenwen; Liu Ou; Luo Xi; Shi Xin; Sun Wenyan; Wang Na; Wu Yiwen; Zhang Xiaohuan	Canada; Marie-Pier Boudreau Gagnon; Camille Bowness; Jo-Annie Fortin; Sandy Gill; Chloé Isaac; Eve Lamoureux; Stéphanie Leclair; Élise Marcotte; Karine Thomas; Valerie Welsh

== Results ==
Green denotes finalists

Rank	Nation	Preliminary		Final	
Rank	Nation	Points	Rank	Points	Rank
1st place, gold medalist(s)	Spain	97.500	1	98.333	1
2nd place, silver medalist(s)	China	96.666	2	97.667	2
3rd place, bronze medalist(s)	Canada	96.000	3	96.167	3
4	Italy	95.000	4	95.667	4
5	Japan	94.667	5	94.833	5
6	Ukraine	93.667	6	94.334	6
7	Great Britain	88.833	7	89.334	7
8	Brazil	88.333	8	88.667	8
9	Belarus	86.833	9	87.333	9
10	Mexico	86.667	10	86.833	10
11	Netherlands	86.500	11	86.500	11
12	Egypt	80.834	12	80.333	12
13	Germany	80.167	13		
