= Synchronized swimming at the 2012 Summer Olympics – Qualification =

Ranking results

== Qualifying system ==
For the team event, the 5 continental champions and 3 further non-qualified teams from an Olympic Qualifying Tournament will qualify for the 2012 Summer Olympics. For the duet event, the same teams will qualify plus a further 16 non-qualified teams from the Olympic Qualifying Tournament will qualify. The host nation is considered European champion, whilst the best-placed teams from Asia, Africa & Oceania at the 2011 World Aquatics Championships will be considered as the respective continental champions.

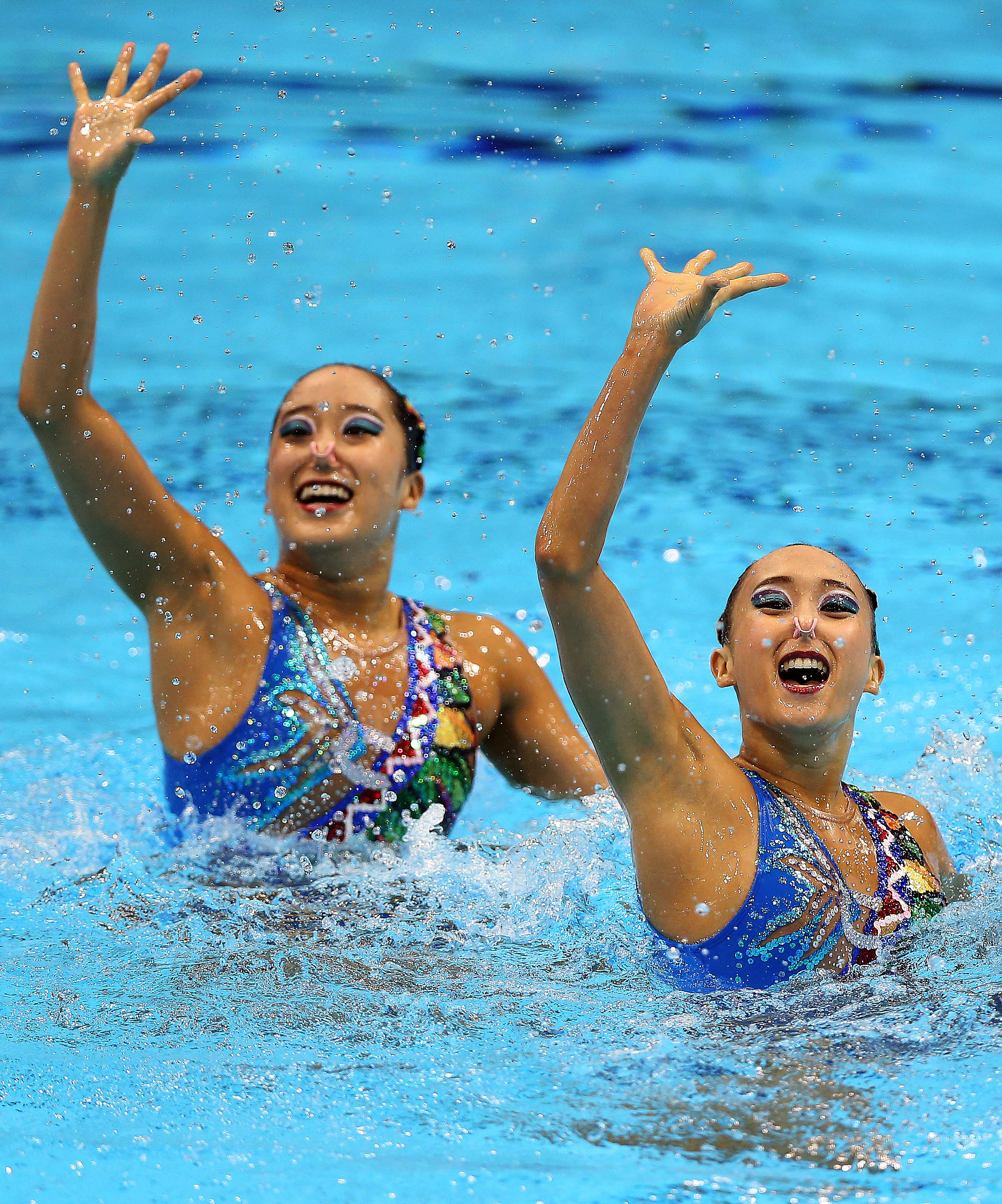
Park Hyun-ha and Park Hyun-sun of South Korea performing their routine at the 2012 Summer Olympics.

== Qualification summary ==
| Nation | Team | Duet | Athletes |
|---|---|---|---|
| Argentina | | X | 2 |
| Australia | X | X | 8 |
| Austria | | X | 2 |
| Brazil | | X | 2 |
| Canada | X | X | 8 |
| Czech Republic | | X | 2 |
| China | X | X | 8 |
| France | | X | 2 |
| Great Britain | X | X | 8 |
| Greece | | X | 2 |
| Egypt | X | X | 8 |
| Hungary | | X | 2 |
| Israel | | X | 2 |
| Italy | | X | 2 |
| Japan | X | X | 8 |
| Kazakhstan | | X | 2 |
| Mexico | | X | 2 |
| North Korea | | X | 2 |
| Russia | X | X | 8 |
| South Korea | | X | 2 |
| Spain | X | X | 8 |
| Switzerland | | X | 2 |
| Ukraine | | X | 2 |
| United States | | X | 2 |
| Total: 24 NOC | 8 | 24 | |

== Qualification timeline ==
| Event | Date | Venue |
|---|---|---|
| 2011 World Aquatics Championships | July 16 to July 31, 2011 | (China) Shanghai |
| 2011 Pan American Games | October 14 to October 30, 2011 | (Mexico) Guadalajara |
| Synchronized Swimming Olympic Qualification Tournament | April 18 to April 22, 2012 | (United Kingdom) London |

- The Asian, Oceania and African qualification tournament will be at the World Aquatics Championships.

== Women's team ==
| Competition | Vacancies | Qualifiers |
|---|---|---|
| Africa | 1 | Egypt |
| Americas | 1 | Canada |
| Asia | 1 | China |
| Europe/Host | 1 | Great Britain |
| Oceania | 1 | Australia |
| 2012 Olympic Qualifying Tournament - Top 3 | 3 | Russia; Spain; Japan |
| TOTAL | 8 | |

== Women's duet ==
| Competition | Vacancies | Qualifiers |
|---|---|---|
| Africa | 1 | Egypt |
| Americas | 1 | Canada |
| Asia | 1 | China |
| Europe/Hosts | 1 | Great Britain |
| Oceania | 1 | Australia |
| 2012 Olympic Qualifying Tournament - Top 3 teams | 3 | Russia; Spain; Japan |
| 2012 Olympic Qualifying Tournament | 16 | Argentina; Austria; Brazil; Czech Republic; France; Greece; Hungary; Israel; Italy; Kazakhstan; Mexico; North Korea; South Korea; Switzerland; Ukraine; United States |
| TOTAL | 24 | |
