= Synchronized swimming at the 2015 Pan American Games – Women's duet =

Women's duet at the 2015 Pan American Games
- Venue: Toronto Pan Am Sports Centre
- Dates: July 9–11, 2015
- Competitors: 24 from 12 nations
- Winning score: 178.0881

Medalists
Gold medal	Jacqueline Simoneau; Karine Thomas	Canada
Silver medal	Karem Achach; Nuria Diosdado	Mexico
Bronze medal	Mariya Koroleva; Alison Williams	United States

The women's duet competition of the synchronized swimming events at the 2015 Pan American Games in Toronto was held from July 9 to July 11, at the Toronto Pan Am Sports Centre. The defending Pan American Champion was duet from Canada.

All twelve duets competed in both rounds of the competition. The first round consisted of a technical, while the second round was a free routine. The winner was the duet with the highest combined score. The technical routine consisted of ten required elements, which had to be completed in order and within a time of between 2 minutes 5 seconds and 2 minutes 35 seconds. The free routine had no restrictions other than time; this routine had to last between 3 minutes 15 seconds and 3 minutes 45 seconds.

The winner Canada qualified to compete in the 2016 Summer Olympics in Rio de Janeiro, Brazil.

== Schedule ==
All times are local Eastern Daylight Time (UTC−4)

Date	Start	Round
July 9, 2015	12:00	Technical routine
July 11, 2015	11:00	Free routine

== Results ==
Rank	Country	Athlete	Technical	Free	Total
1st place, gold medalist(s)	Canada	Jacqueline Simoneau; Karine Thomas	88.0881 (1)	90.0000 (1)	178.0881
2nd place, silver medalist(s)	Mexico	Karem Achach; Nuria Diosdado	84.4133 (2)	86.3667 (2)	170.7800
3rd place, bronze medalist(s)	United States	Mariya Koroleva; Alison Williams	82.5209 (3)	83.8667 (3)	166.3876
4	Brazil	Luisa Borges; Maria De Souza	80.9667 (4)	82.3000 (4)	163.2667
5	Colombia	Estefanía Álvarez; Mónica Arango	80.1780 (5)	81.6333 (5)	161.8113
6	Argentina	Etel Sánchez; Sofía Sánchez	79.0024 (6)	80.1333 (6)	159.1357
7	Aruba	Anouk Eman; Kyra Hoevertsz	74.4087 (8)	76.4333 (7)	150.8420
8	Venezuela	Oriana Carrillo; Greisy Gomez	74.4927 (7)	75.2333 (8)	149.7260
9	Chile	Kelley Kobler; Natalie Lubascher	73.4707 (9)	74.8000 (9)	148.2707
10	Costa Rica	Fiorella Calvo; Natalia Jenkis	67.5680 (10)	70.2333 (10)	137.8013
11	Cuba	Cristy Alfonso; Melissa Alonso	65.5485 (11)	65.5000 (11)	131.0485
12	Guatemala	Joceline Acabal; Maria Castaneda	59.8423 (12)	59.6000 (12)	119.4423
