= Synchronized swimming at the 2010 South American Games =

- Dates: March 26-29

Synchronized swimming at the 2010 South American Games in Medellín was held from March 26 to March 29. All games were played at Complejo Acuático.

== Medal summary ==
Rank	Nation	Gold	Silver	Bronze	Total
1	Brazil (BRA)	3	0	0	3
2	Colombia (COL)	0	3	0	3
3	Argentina (ARG)	0	0	3	3
Totals (3 entries)		3	3	3	9

== Medalists ==
Event	Gold	Silver	Bronze
Solo	Giovana Stephan; Brazil	Asly Alegria; Colombia	Etel Sánchez; Argentina
Duet Free	Nayara Figueira; Lara Teixeira; Brazil	Mónica Arango; Jennifer Cerquera; Colombia	Etel Sánchez; Sofía Sánchez; Argentina
Team Free	Beatriz Feres; Branca Feres; Nayara Figueira; Michelle Frota; Lorena Molinos; Pamela Nogueira; Giovanna Stephan; Lara Teixeira; Brazil	Asly Alegria; Mónica Arango; Laura Arango; Jennifer Cerquera; Ingrid Cubillos; Laura Urrego; Zully Pérez; Maritza Aguilar; Colombia	Maria Florencia Arce; Irina Bandurek; Delfina Brunatto; Lucia Paula Diaz; Brenda Moller; Etel Sánchez; Sofía Sánchez; Lucina Simon; Argentina
