= Synchronized swimming at the 2012 Summer Olympics – Women's duet =

Women's duet at the Games of the XXX Olympiad
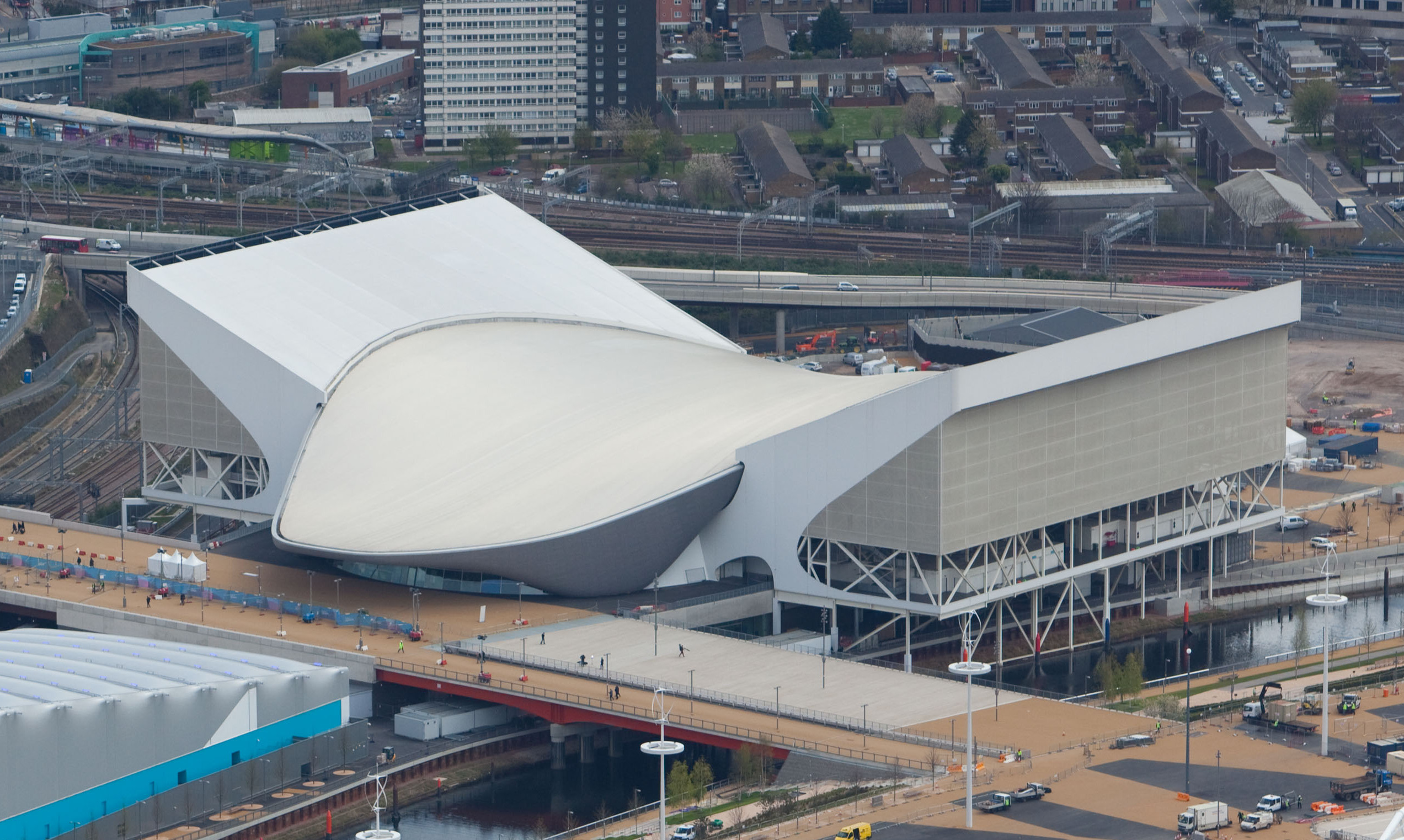
- Aquatics Centre in London
- Venue: Aquatics Centre
- Date: 5–7 August
- Competitors: 48 from 24 nations
- Winning points: 197.100

Medalists
1st place, gold medalist(s)		Natalia Ishchenko; Svetlana Romashina	Russia
2nd place, silver medalist(s)		Ona Carbonell; Andrea Fuentes	Spain
3rd place, bronze medalist(s)		Huang Xuechen; Liu Ou	China

The Women's duet event at the 2012 Summer Olympics in London, United Kingdom, took place at the Aquatics Centre from 5 to 7 August.

The preliminary phase consisted of a technical routine and a free routine. The scores from the two routines were added together and the top 12 duets qualified for the final.

The final consisted of one free routine, the score from the final free routine was added to the score from the preliminary technical routine to decide the overall winners.

== Schedule ==
All times are UTC+1

Date	Time	Round
Sunday 5 August 2012	15:00	Preliminary Technical Routine
Monday 6 August 2012	15:00	Preliminary Free Routine
Tuesday 7 August 2012	15:00	Final Free Routine

== Results ==
=== Qualification ===
Rank	Country	Athlete	Technical	Free	Total
1	Russia	Natalia Ishchenko & Svetlana Romashina	98.200	98.600	196.800
2	China	Huang Xuechen & Liu Ou	96.100	96.710	192.810
3	Spain	Ona Carbonell & Andrea Fuentes	96.000	96.590	192.590
4	Canada	Marie-Pier Boudreau Gagnon & Élise Marcotte	94.500	94.750	189.250
5	Japan	Yukiko Inui & Chisa Kobayashi	93.200	93.200	186.400
6	Ukraine	Daria Iushko & Kseniya Sydorenko	92.200	92.140	184.340
7	Italy	Giulia Lapi & Mariangela Perrupato	90.700	90.740	181.440
8	Greece	Evangelia Platanioti & Despoina Solomou	89.200	88.840	178.040
9	Great Britain	Olivia Federici & Jenna Randall	88.100	88.790	176.890
10	United States	Mary Killman & Mariya Koroleva	87.900	88.270	176.170
11	France	Sara Labrousse & Chloé Willhelm	87.700	88.340	176.040
12	South Korea	Park Hyun-Ha & Park Hyun-Sun	86.700	87.460	174.160
13	Brazil	Nayara Figueira & Lara Teixeira	87.100	87.000	174.100
14	Czech Republic	Soňa Bernardová & Alžběta Dufková	85.800	86.040	171.840
15	Kazakhstan	Anna Kulkina & Aigerim Zhexembinova	84.600	84.980	169.580
16	North Korea	Jang Hyang-Mi & Jong Yon-Hui	84.400	84.830	169.230
17	Israel	Anastasia Gloushkov & Inna Yoffe	83.400	83.520	166.920
18	Mexico	Isabel Delgado & Nuria Diosdado	83.000	83.610	166.610
19	Austria	Nadine Brandl & Livia Lang	82.000	81.850	163.850
20	Switzerland	Pamela Fischer & Anja Nyffeler	81.200	82.120	163.320
21	Hungary	Eszter Czékus & Szofi Kiss	79.400	79.080	158.480
22	Argentina	Etel Sánchez & Sofía Sánchez	78.900	78.410	157.310
23	Australia	Eloise Amberger & Sarah Bombell	77.400	77.480	154.880
24	Egypt	Shaza Abdelrahman & Dalia El-Gebaly	75.700	76.400	152.100

=== Final ===
Rank	Country	Athlete	Technical	Free	Total
1st place, gold medalist(s)	Russia	Natalia Ishchenko & Svetlana Romashina	98.200	98.900	197.100
2nd place, silver medalist(s)	Spain	Ona Carbonell & Andrea Fuentes	96.000	96.900	192.900
3rd place, bronze medalist(s)	China	Huang Xuechen & Liu Ou	96.100	96.770	192.870
4	Canada	Marie-Pier Boudreau Gagnon & Élise Marcotte	94.500	94.620	189.120
5	Japan	Yukiko Inui & Chisa Kobayashi	93.200	93.540	186.740
6	Ukraine	Daria Iushko & Kseniya Sydorenko	92.200	92.670	184.870
7	Italy	Giulia Lapi & Mariangela Perrupato	90.700	90.720	181.420
8	Greece	Evangelia Platanioti & Despoina Solomou	89.200	89.360	178.560
9	Great Britain	Olivia Federici & Jenna Randall	88.100	89.170	177.270
10	France	Sara Labrousse & Chloé Willhelm	87.700	88.560	176.260
11	United States	Mary Killman & Mariya Koroleva	87.900	87.770	175.670
12	South Korea	Park Hyun-Ha & Park Hyun-Sun	86.700	87.250	173.950
