= Synchronized swimming at the 2010 South American Games – Solo =

The Women's Solo event at the 2010 South American Games had the Technical Routine on March 27 at 20:30, and the Free Routine on March 28 at 20:30.

== Medalists ==
| Gold | Silver | Bronze |
|---|---|---|
| Giovana Stephan; Brazil | Asly Alegria; Colombia | Etel Sánchez; Argentina |

== Results ==
=== Technical Routine ===
| Rank | Athlete | EX | OI | Pen. | 50% Points |
|---|---|---|---|---|---|
| 1 | Giovana Stephan (BRA) | 42.667 | 43.167 | | 42.917 |
| 2 | Asly Alegria (COL) | 42.167 | 43.000 | | 42.584 |
| 3 | Etel Sánchez (ARG) | 40.167 | 40.667 | | 40.417 |
| 4 | Greisy Gomez (VEN) | 39.167 | 39.667 | | 39.417 |
| 5 | Kelley Pedemonte (CHI) | 36.167 | 35.667 | | 35.917 |
| 6 | Virginie Isabelle Chevalet (PAR) | 30.667 | 33.167 | –0.5 | 32.167 |

=== Free Routine ===
| Rank | Athlete | TM | AI | Pen. | 50% Points |
|---|---|---|---|---|---|
| 1 | Giovana Stephan (BRA) | 43.833 | 43.000 | | 43.417 |
| 1 | Asly Alegria (COL) | 43.500 | 43.333 | | 43.417 |
| 3 | Etel Sánchez (ARG) | 41.333 | 40.833 | | 41.083 |
| 4 | Greisy Gomez (VEN) | 40.167 | 37.833 | | 39.000 |
| 5 | Kelley Pedemonte (CHI) | 37.167 | 36.333 | | 36.750 |
| 6 | Virginie Isabelle Chevalet (PAR) | 32.833 | 33.333 | | 33.083 |

=== Summary ===
| Rank | Athlete | TR | FR | Total points |
|---|---|---|---|---|
| 1st place, gold medalist(s) | Giovana Stephan (BRA) | 42.917 | 43.417 | 86.334 |
| 2nd place, silver medalist(s) | Asly Alegria (COL) | 42.584 | 43.417 | 86.001 |
| 3rd place, bronze medalist(s) | Etel Sánchez (ARG) | 40.417 | 41.083 | 81.500 |
| 4 | Greisy Gomez (VEN) | 39.417 | 39.000 | 78.417 |
| 5 | Kelley Pedemonte (CHI) | 35.917 | 36.750 | 72.667 |
| 6 | Virginie Isabelle Chevalet (PAR) | 32.167 | 33.083 | 65.250 |
