= Chevalet =

Chevalet may refer to:

- Easel, French expression originally meaning "little horse", deriving from the diminutive for "cheval" (m) - "horse"
- Trestle support, an improvised table or device for lifting up work pieces
- Bridge (instrument), a device supporting the strings on a stringed musical instrument
- Wooden horse (device), a torture device
- Virginie Isabelle Chevalet, a synchronized swimmer
- Émile Chevalet, a 19th-century French playwright and librettist
