= Izabella Chiappini =

Brazilian water polo player

Personal information
- Full name: Izabella Maizza Chiappini
- Born: 28 September 1995 (age 30) Brazil
- Height: 171 cm (5 ft 7 in)
- Weight: 67 kg (148 lb)

Sport
- Sport: Water polo
Medal record
Representing Brazil
Pan American Games
Bronze medal – third place	2011 Guadalajara	Team
Bronze medal – third place	2015 Toronto	Team
- Updated on 19 August 2015

Izabella Maizza Chiappini (born 28 September 1995) is a Brazilian-born Italian water polo player.

She was part of the Brazilian team at the 2013 World Aquatics Championships, 2015 World Aquatics Championships, and the 2016 Summer Olympics.

After that, Chiappini chose to represent Italy internationally.

== See also ==
- Brazil at the 2015 World Aquatics Championships
