= Shi Xin =

Chinese synchronized swimmer

Personal information
- National team: China
- Born: January 13, 1987 (age 39) Nanjing, Jiangsu, China
- Height: 1.70 m (5 ft 7 in)
- Weight: 53 kg (117 lb)

Sport
- Sport: Swimming
- Strokes: Synchronized swimming
Medal record
Women's synchronized swimming
Representing China
World Championships
Silver medal – second place	2009 Rome	Free Routine Combination
Asian Games
Gold medal – first place	2010 Guangzhou	Combined Routine

Shi Xin (Chinese: 史欣, born 13 January 1987 in Nanjing) is a retired Chinese competitor in synchronized swimming. Xin is married and has two daughters. She is currently a synchronized swimming coach for the Mad City Aqua Stars in Madison, Wisconsin.

She has won a silver medal at the 2009 World Aquatics Championships, 2 silvers at the 2010 FINA Synchronized Swimming World Cup, and a gold medal at the 2010 Asian Games.
