= Synchronized swimming at the 2010 South American Games – Duet Free =

The Women's Duet event at the 2010 South American Games had the Technical Routine on March 26 at 20:30, and the Free Routine on March 28 at 21:50.

== Medalists ==
Gold	Silver	Bronze
Nayara Figueira; Lara Teixeira; Brazil	Mónica Arango; Jennifer Cerquera; Colombia	Etel Sánchez; Sofía Sánchez; Argentina

== Results ==
=== Technical Routine ===
Rank	Athlete	EX	OI	50% Points
1	Brazil; Nayara Figueira; Lara Teixeira	43.833	43.833	43.833
2	Colombia; Mónica Arango; Jennifer Cerquera	40.500	41.167	40.834
3	Argentina; Etel Sánchez; Sofía Sánchez	39.333	38.000	38.667
4	Venezuela; Anna Carolina Soto; Mary Alejandra Soto	38.500	37.167	37.834
5	Uruguay; Sofia Orihuela; Florencia Rodrigo	35.333	34.167	34.750
6	Chile; Catalina Reyes; Francisca Aceituno	34.000	31.833	32.917

=== Free Routine ===
Rank	Athlete	TM	AI	50% Points
1	Brazil; Nayara Figueira; Lara Teixeira	43.500	45.000	44.250
2	Colombia; Mónica Arango; Jennifer Cerquera	42.000	42.677	42.334
3	Argentina; Etel Sánchez; Sofía Sánchez	39.833	41.667	40.750
4	Venezuela; Anna Carolina Soto; Mary Alejandra Soto	38.667	42.000	40.334
5	Chile; Catalina Reyes; Francisca Aceituno	35.000	36.167	35.584
6	Uruguay; Sofia Orihuela; Florencia Rodrigo	32.333	35.833	34.083

=== Summary ===
Rank	Athlete	TR	FR	Total points
1st place, gold medalist(s)	Brazil; Nayara Figueira; Lara Teixeira	43.833	44.250	88.083
2nd place, silver medalist(s)	Colombia; Mónica Arango; Jennifer Cerquera	40.834	42.334	83.168
3rd place, bronze medalist(s)	Argentina; Etel Sánchez; Sofía Sánchez	38.667	40.750	79.417
4	Venezuela; Anna Carolina Soto; Mary Alejandra Soto	37.834	40.334	78.168
5	Uruguay; Sofia Orihuela; Florencia Rodrigo	34.750	34.083	68.833
6	Chile; Catalina Reyes; Francisca Aceituno	32.917	35.584	68.501
