= Lucianne Barroncas =

Brazilian water polo player

Personal information
- Full name: Lucianne Barroncas
- Born: 1 April 1988 (age 38)
- Height: 170 cm (5 ft 7 in)
- Weight: 64 kg (141 lb)

Sport
- Sport: water polo
- Updated on 19 August 2015

Lucianne Barroncas (born 1 April 1988) is a Brazilian water polo player. She was part of the Brazilian team at the 2015 World Aquatics Championships. She also participated on the Brazilian Water Polo team at the 2016 Olympics.

== See also ==
- Brazil at the 2015 World Aquatics Championships
