= Mary Killman =

American synchronized swimmer

Personal information
- Nationality: United States
- Born: April 9, 1991 (age 35) Ada, Oklahoma, USA
- Height: 1.68 m (5 ft 6 in)
- Weight: 60 kg (132 lb)

Sport
- Sport: Swimming
- Strokes: Synchronized swimming
- Club: Santa Clara Aquamaids
- College team: Lindenwood Lions
- Coach: Mayuko Fujiki (Olympics); Lori Eaton (Lindenwood)
Medal record
Representing United States
Synchronized swimming
Pan American Games
Silver medal – second place	2011 Guadalajara	Duet
Silver medal – second place	2011 Guadalajara	Team competition
Bronze medal – third place	2015 Toronto	Team competition
- Updated on 14 March 2016

Mary Killman (born April 9, 1991) is an American synchronized swimmer. After switching to synchronized swimming from race swimming, Killman was a member of the teams that won silver medals in the duet and team competitions at the 2011 Pan American Games in Guadalajara, Mexico and 2015 Pan American Games in Toronto, Ontario, Canada.

== Biography ==
Killman was born on April 9, 1991, in Ada, Oklahoma, and grew up in Texas. She is an enrolled member of the Citizen Potawatomi Nation, a federally recognized tribe based in Oklahoma. Originally a competitor in racing events, Killman began to participate in synchronized swimming competitions at the age of 11, and at age 15 gave up racing to focus exclusively on synchronized swimming.

After competing in youth competitions through the 2000s, in 2007 Killman was named to her first National Team at the mere age of 16. In 2009 Killman found success at the United States National Championships, finishing third in the solo competition, second in the duet competition, and first in the team competition. Shortly before the 2011 Pan American Games in Guadalajara, Mexico, she was partnered with Mariya Koroleva to compete as a duet. At those games, Killman and Koroleva won a silver medal in the duet competition, and were part of the United States team that won a silver in the team competition as well. The pair qualified for the women's duet at the 2012 Summer Olympics in London, and due to the failure of the United States to qualify for the team event, they were the only American women to compete in synchronized swimming at those games.

Following the 2012 Olympics, Killman joined the Lindenwood University synchronized swimming team, one of six collegiate varsity synchronized programs in the United States and is currently a four times USA synchro athlete of the year (2010, 2011, 2012, 2014); she holds five US senior national solo titles (2010, 2013, 2014, 2015, 2016) and three US collegiate national solo titles (2013, 2014, 2015) with the 4th consecutive title not claimed due to not competing at the collegiate level for her senior year.
