= Park Hyun-sun =

South Korean synchronized swimmer

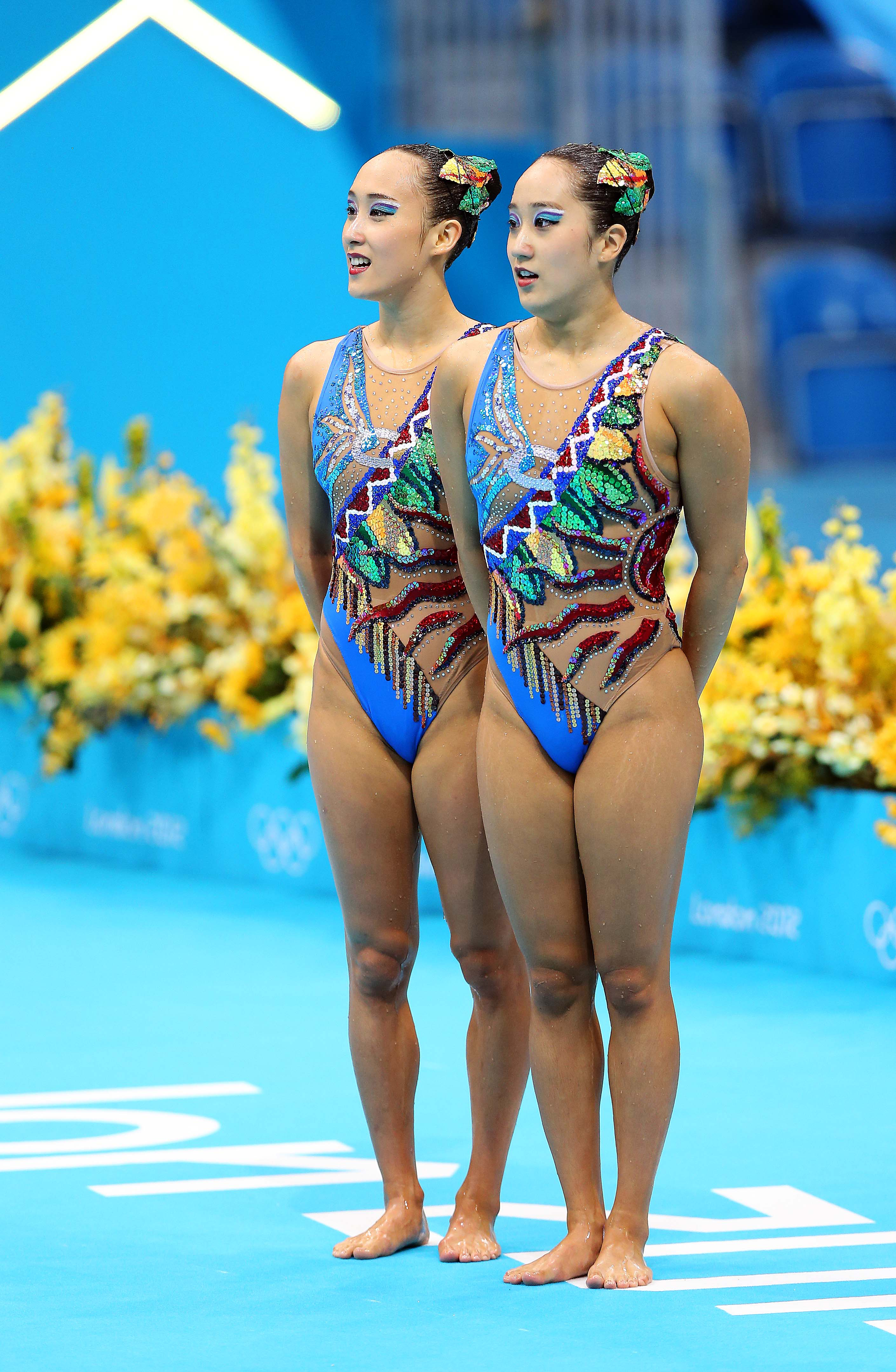
- 2012 London Olympic Games Korea Synchronised Swimming Team, Park Hyunha and Park Hyunsun.

Personal information
- Nationality: South Korean
- Born: 22 January 1988 (age 38) Seoul, South Korea
- Height: 5 ft 3 in (160 cm)
- Weight: 50 kg (110 lb)

Sport
- Sport: Swimming
- Event: Synchronized swimming

Korean name
- Hangul: 박현선
- RR: Bak Hyeonseon
- MR: Pak Hyŏnsŏn
Medal record
Representing South Korea
Asian Games
Bronze medal – third place	2010 Guangzhou	Duet
- Updated on 24 October 2014

Park Hyun-sun (born 22 January 1988) is a South Korean synchronized swimmer. She competed in the women's duet at the 2012 Summer Olympics with her younger sister Park Hyun-ha.
