= Krystina =

Krystina is a feminine given name. Notable people with the name include:

- Krystina Alabado (born 1989), American actress and singer
- Krystina Alogbo (born 1986), Canadian water polo player
- Krystina Arielle (born 1986), American actress, host, and cosplayer
- Krystina Emmanouilides (born 1991), Greek-Australian computational fluid dynamics engineer

== Fictional characters ==
- Krystina Carrington, a character in the American soap opera Dynasty

== See also ==
- Krystsina Tsimanouskaya (born 1996), Belarusian-born Polish sprinter
