= Park Hyun-ha =

South Korean synchronized swimmer

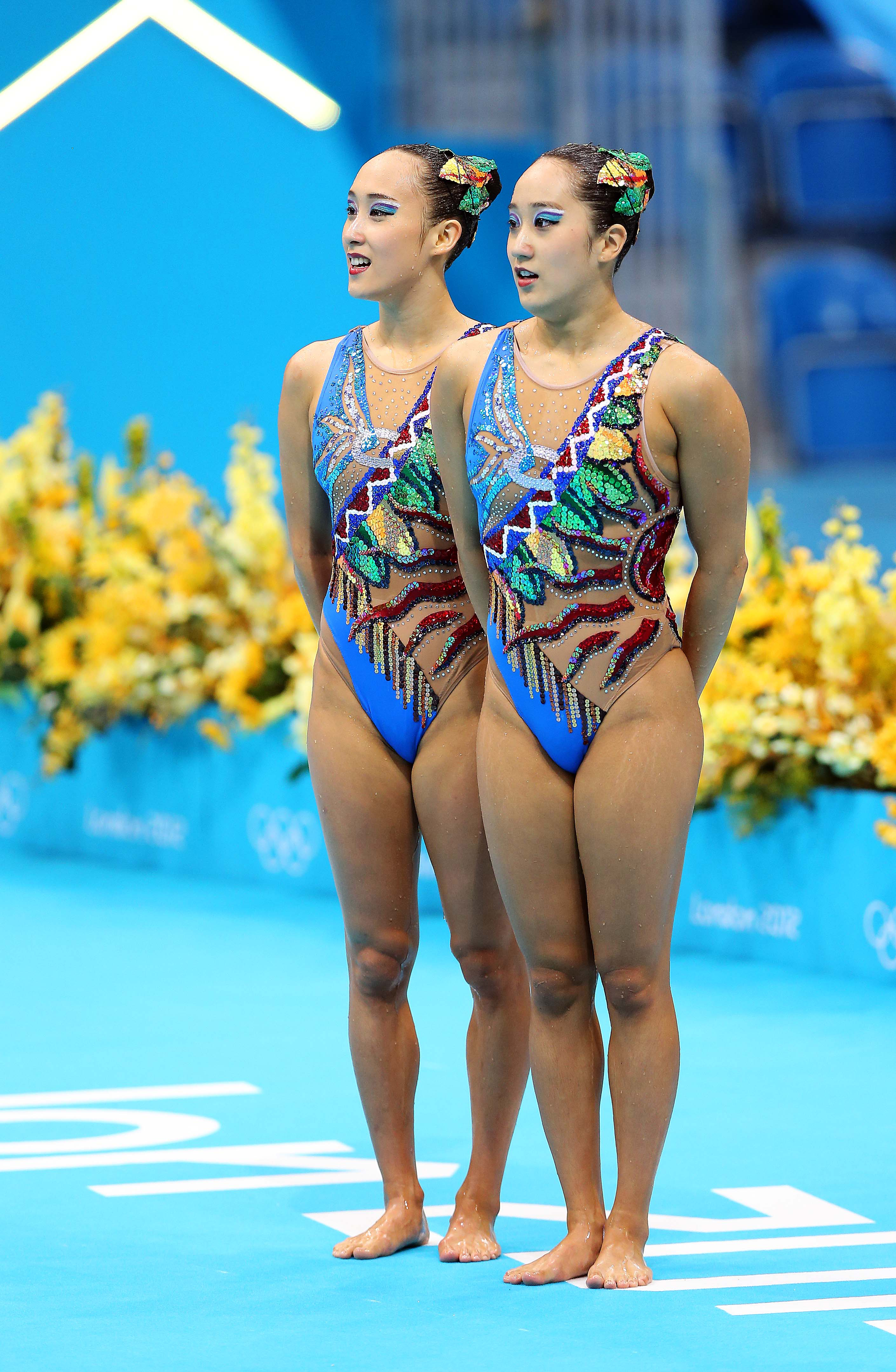
- Park Hyun-ha with her sister Park Hyun-sun

Personal information
- Nationality: South Korean
- Born: 19 July 1989 (age 36) Seoul, South Korea
- Height: 5 ft 4 in (163 cm)
- Weight: 51 kg (112 lb)

Sport
- Sport: Swimming
- Event: Synchronized swimming

Korean name
- Hangul: 박현하
- RR: Bak Hyeonha
- MR: Pak Hyŏnha
Medal record
Representing South Korea
Asian Games
Bronze medal – third place	2010 Guangzhou	Duet
- Updated on 23 October 2014

Park Hyun-ha (Korean: 박현하; born 19 July 1989 in Seoul) is a South Korean synchronized swimmer. She competed in the women's duet at the 2012 Summer Olympics with her sister Park Hyun-sun.
