= Virginie Isabelle Chevalet =

French synchronized swimmer

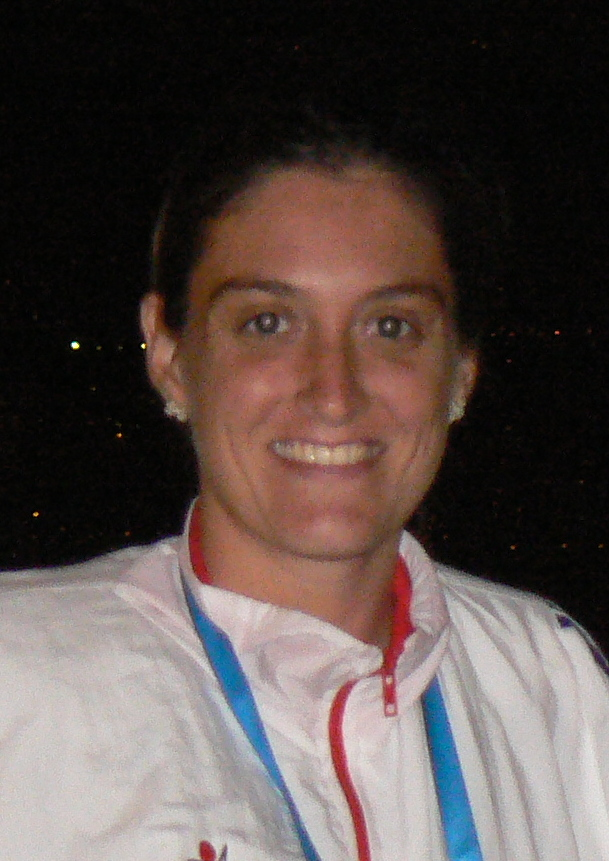
- Chevalet at the 2010 South American Games

Personal information
- Born: 1 December 1984 (age 41) Paris, France

Sport
- Sport: Synchronised swimming

Virginie Isabelle Chevalet (born 1 December 1984) in Paris, France, is a synchronized swimmer athlete who represent Paraguay in this sport. Her participation at the 2010 South American Games in Medellin has been the historical debut of Paraguay in this sport.

Currently, she lives in Aregua.
