= Nayara Figueira =

Brazilian synchronized swimmer

Personal information
- Nationality: Brazil
- Born: 9 June 1988 (age 38) São Paulo, Brazil
- Height: 1.69 m (5 ft 7 in)
- Weight: 56 kg (123 lb)

Sport
- Sport: Swimming
- Strokes: Synchronized swimming
- Club: Clube Paineiras do Morumby
Medal record
Representing Brazil
Synchronized swimming
South American Games
Gold medal – first place	2010 Medellin	Duet free
Gold medal – first place	2010 Medellin	Team free
Pan American Games
Bronze medal – third place	2007 Rio de Janeiro	Women's team
Bronze medal – third place	2011 Guadalajara	Women's duet
Bronze medal – third place	2011 Guadalajara	Women's team
- Updated on 22 May 2015

Nayara Figueira (born 9 June 1988) is a Brazilian synchronized swimmer. She competed in the women's duet at the 2008 and 2012 Summer Olympics. Her partner in 2008 and 2012 was Lara Teixeira.

She first teamed up with Teixeira in 2007, so their team only had a year's worth of experience when they competed at the 2008 Summer Olympics. The Brazilian duet pair did not reach the final, finishing in 13th place.

At the 2009 World Aquatic Championships, the pair made the final, finishing in 11th.

At the 2012 Olympics, the team of Teixeria and Figueria missed the final by only 0.3 points. Their technical routine costumes were in the style of Romero Brito and their music was by Arnaldo Antunes. The team also won gold at the South American Synchronised Swimming Championships.

She also performed with Cirque du Soleil's O.
