= Scotiabank Aquatics Center =

Aquatics center in Zapopan, Mexico

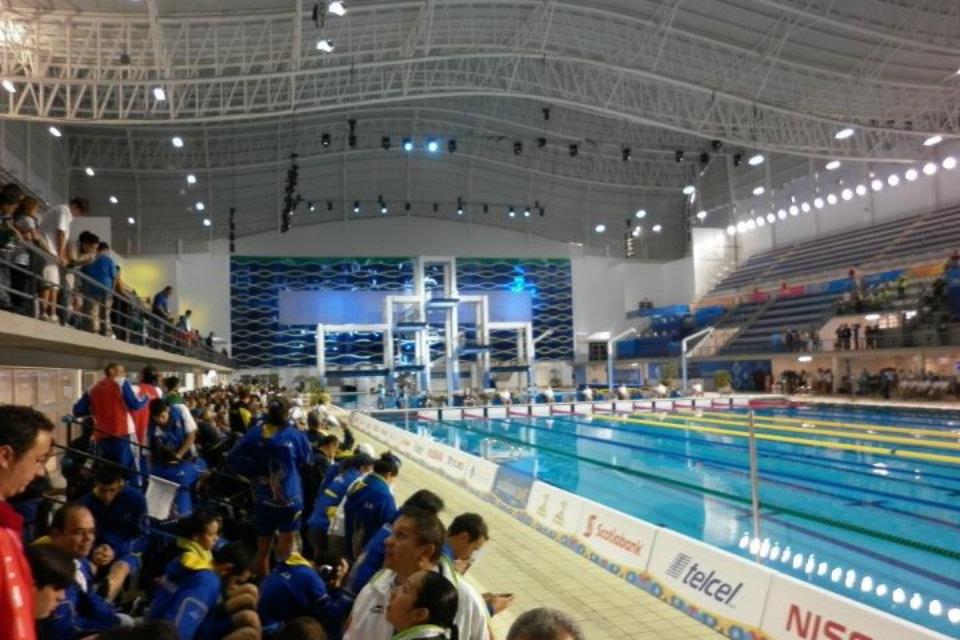
- Inside the aquatics center during the 2011 Pan Am Games
- Full name: National Aquatics Center
- Address: Zapopan, Mexico
- Capacity: 3,593
- Pool size: 50 m × 25 m (164 ft × 82 ft)

Construction
- Opened: June 22, 2011
- Cost: $31.7m (2011)

The Scotiabank Aquatics Center is an aquatics center built for the 2011 Pan American Games in the municipality of Zapopan, near Guadalajara, Mexico. It was opened June 22, 2011, built at a cost of $USD31.7m (380 million pesos). It is the most modern aquatic complex of its kind in Latin America, and considered to be the second best in the world by the Fédération Internationale de Natation. It has a permanent capacity of 3,593, but had a capacity of 5,000 spectators for the Pan American Games.

The outside of the building is shaped like a wave. It contains two 50m Olympic sized pools and a diving tank. During the 2011 Pan American Games, it hosted the swimming, diving, synchronized swimming and water polo events. After the Pan American Games, it is used as a high-performance training centre, and was a bid for the 2017 World Aquatics Championships, losing to Budapest.

The center is sponsored by Scotiabank, a Canadian-based bank, which operates in Mexico under the name Scotiabank Inverlat.

== See also ==
- 2011 Pan American Games
