= Mariya Koroleva =

American synchronized swimmer

Personal information
- Born: April 10, 1990 (age 36) Yaroslavl, Russian SFSR, Soviet Union
- Height: 1.65 m (5 ft 5 in)
- Weight: 55 kg (121 lb)

Sport
- Country: United States
- Sport: Synchronized swimming
- Club: Stanford Cardinal
Medal record
Representing United States
Women's Synchronized swimming
Pan American Games
Silver medal – second place	2011 Guadalajara	Duet
Silver medal – second place	2011 Guadalajara	Team competition
Bronze medal – third place	2015 Toronto	Duet
Universiade
Bronze medal – third place	2013 Kazan	Team competition
- Updated on 24 May 2015

Mariya Koroleva (born April 10, 1990) is a Russian-born American synchronized swimmer. After emigrating to the United States, Koroleva began participating in synchronized swimming, and competed at Stanford University. She was a member of the teams that won silver medals in the duet and team competitions at the 2011 Pan American Games in Guadalajara, Mexico. She competed at the 2012 and 2016 Summer Olympics.

== Biography ==
Koroleva was born on April 10, 1990, in Yaroslavl, Russian SFSR, Soviet Union, to Svetlana and Nikolay Korolev, and later emigrated with her family to the United States, settling in Concord, California. There, she began to compete in national youth competitions in synchronized swimming.

After being accepted to Stanford University, she experienced considerable success in collegiate and national competitions. In the 2009 collegiate championships, she finished second in team and figures, third in trio, and fifth in duet. That same year at the national championships she came in third in team and fourth in duet. During the following year's collegiate championships, she finished second place in the trio competition and third in the duet.

Shortly before the 2011 Pan American Games in Guadalajara, Mexico, she was partnered with Mary Killman to compete as a duet. At those games, Killman and Koroleva won a silver medal in the duet competition, and were members of the United States team that won a silver in the team competition as well. The pair qualified for the women's duet at the 2012 Summer Olympics in London, and due to the failure of the United States to qualify for the team event, they were the only American women to compete in synchronized swimming at those games.

Koroleva was one of three University of San Francisco students to compete in the 2016 Summer Olympics, joined by Israeli long-distance runner Maor Tiyouri and Venezuelan basketball player John Cox. At the 2016 Summer Olympics, she teamed with Anita Alvarez in the women's duet, finishing in 9th place.

Koroleva resides in the Bay Area with her husband and former professional race car driver, Alex Lloyd.
