= Maria Clara Lobo =

Brazilian synchronised swimmer

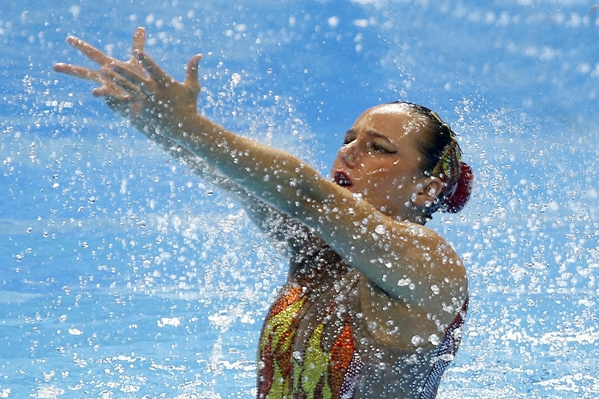

Personal information
- Born: 3 September 1998 (age 28)

Sport
- Sport: Swimming
- Strokes: Synchronised swimming

Maria Clara Lobo (born 3 September 1998) is a Brazilian synchronised swimmer. She competed in the team event at the 2016 Summer Olympics.
