= Éve Lamoureux =

Canadian synchronized swimmer

Personal information
- Born: July 10, 1987 (age 38) Longueuil, Canada

Sport
- Sport: Synchronised swimming
Medal record
Representing Canada
World Championships
Bronze medal – third place	2009 Rome	Team, free routine
Pan American Games
Silver medal – second place	2007 Rio de Janeiro	Team

Éve Lamoureux (born 10 July 1987) is a Canadian synchronized swimmer who competed in the 2008 Summer Olympics.
