= Karine Thomas =

Canadian synchronized swimmer

Personal information
- Nationality: Canada
- Born: January 14, 1989 (age 37) Hull, Quebec (now Gatineau, Quebec)
- Height: 172 cm (5 ft 8 in)
- Weight: 54 kg (119 lb)

Sport
- Sport: Swimming
- Strokes: Synchronized swimming
- Club: Synchro Canada
Medal record
Representing Canada
Synchronized swimming
FINA World Aquatics Championships
Bronze medal – third place	2009 Rome	Free routine combination
Bronze medal – third place	2011 Shanghai	Free routine combination
Pan American Games
Gold medal – first place	2011 Guadalajara	Women's team
Gold medal – first place	2015 Toronto	Women's duet
Gold medal – first place	2015 Toronto	Women's team

Karine Thomas (born January 14, 1989) was a Canadian synchronized swimmer.

Her parents were on the national water-polo team. Her grandmother, Esther Blais-Valin, was a synchronized swimmer in the 1940s and 50s.

== Career ==
Thomas began synchronized swimming at age ten, at thirteen she moved to Montreal to further her training. She joined the national team in 2007 and competed in her first world championships that year. Thomas was a two time Olympian competing in the women's team event at the 2012 Olympic Games, finishing fourth, and in the duet event at the 2016 Olympics, finishing seventh. Thomas won two golds at the 2015 Pan American Games, one in the team event and one with her partner Jacqueline Simoneau in the duet. In May 2017 Thomas retired from synchronized swimming, after being on the Canadian national team for ten years.
