= Chloé Isaac =

Canadian synchronized swimmer

Personal information
- Nationality: Canada
- Born: June 5, 1991 (age 35) Montivilliers, France
- Height: 1.69 m (5 ft 7 in)
- Weight: 57 kg (126 lb)

Sport
- Sport: Swimming
- Strokes: Synchronized swimming
- Club: Synchro Canada
Medal record
Synchronized swimming
Representing Canada
World Aquatics Championships
Bronze medal – third place	2009 Rome	Combination
Bronze medal – third place	2011 Shanghai	Combination
Commonwealth Games
Gold medal – first place	2010 Delhi	Duet
- Updated on May 30, 2015

Chloé Isaac (born June 5, 1991) is a French-born Canadian synchronized swimmer who competed at the London 2012 Olympics and 2013 World Aquatics Championships.

Chloé won a bronze medal in the combo event at the 2009 and 2011 FINA World Aquatics Championships. In 2010, she won a gold medal in the women's duet at the Commonwealth Games in Delhi with Marie-Pier Boudreau Gagnon.
