= Pâmela Nogueira =

Brazilian synchronized swimmer

Personal information
- Born: 17 July 1988 (age 38) Rio de Janeiro, Brazil

Sport
- Sport: Synchronized swimming
Medal record
Representing Brazil
Pan American Games
Bronze medal – third place	2007 Rio de Janeiro	Team
Bronze medal – third place	2011 Guadalajara	Team
South American Games
Gold medal – first place	2010 Medellin	Team
- Updated on 7 June 2024

Pâmela Nogueira (born 17 July 1988) is a Brazilian synchronized swimmer. She competed in the women's team event at the 2016 Summer Olympics.
