= Jo-Annie Fortin =

Canadian synchronized swimmer

Personal information
- Nationality: Canada
- Born: October 25, 1990 (age 35) Montreal, Quebec, Canada
- Height: 5 ft 9 in (175 cm)
- Weight: 56 kg (123 lb)

Sport
- Sport: Swimming
- Strokes: Synchronized swimming
- Club: Synchro Canada
Medal record
Representing Canada
Synchronized swimming
FINA World Aquatics Championships
Bronze medal – third place	2009 Rome	Free routine combination
Bronze medal – third place	2011 Shanghai	Free routine combination
Pan American Games
Gold medal – first place	2011 Guadalajara	Women's team
- Updated on May 21, 2015

Jo-Annie Fortin (born October 25, 1990) was a Canadian synchronized swimmer and Olympian.

== Career ==
Fortin was a member of Canada's national synchronized swimming team. Competing in the team events she would win bronze medals at the 2009 World Aquatics Championships and the 2011 World Aquatics Championships. She competed in the women's team event at the 2012 Olympic Games, finishing fourth. She retired from the sport after the 2012 games.

== Honours ==
In 2012 Fortin was awarded a Queen Elizabeth II Diamond Jubilee Medal.
