= Maria Bruno =

Brazilian synchronised swimmer

Personal information
- Born: 28 August 1992 (age 33) Rio de Janeiro, Brazil

Sport
- Sport: Synchronised swimming
Medal record
Representing Brazil
Pan American Games
Bronze medal – third place	2011 Guadalajara	Team

Maria Bruno (born 28 August 1992) is a Brazilian synchronised swimmer. She competed in the team event at the 2016 Summer Olympics.
