= Tracy Little =

Canadian synchronized swimmer

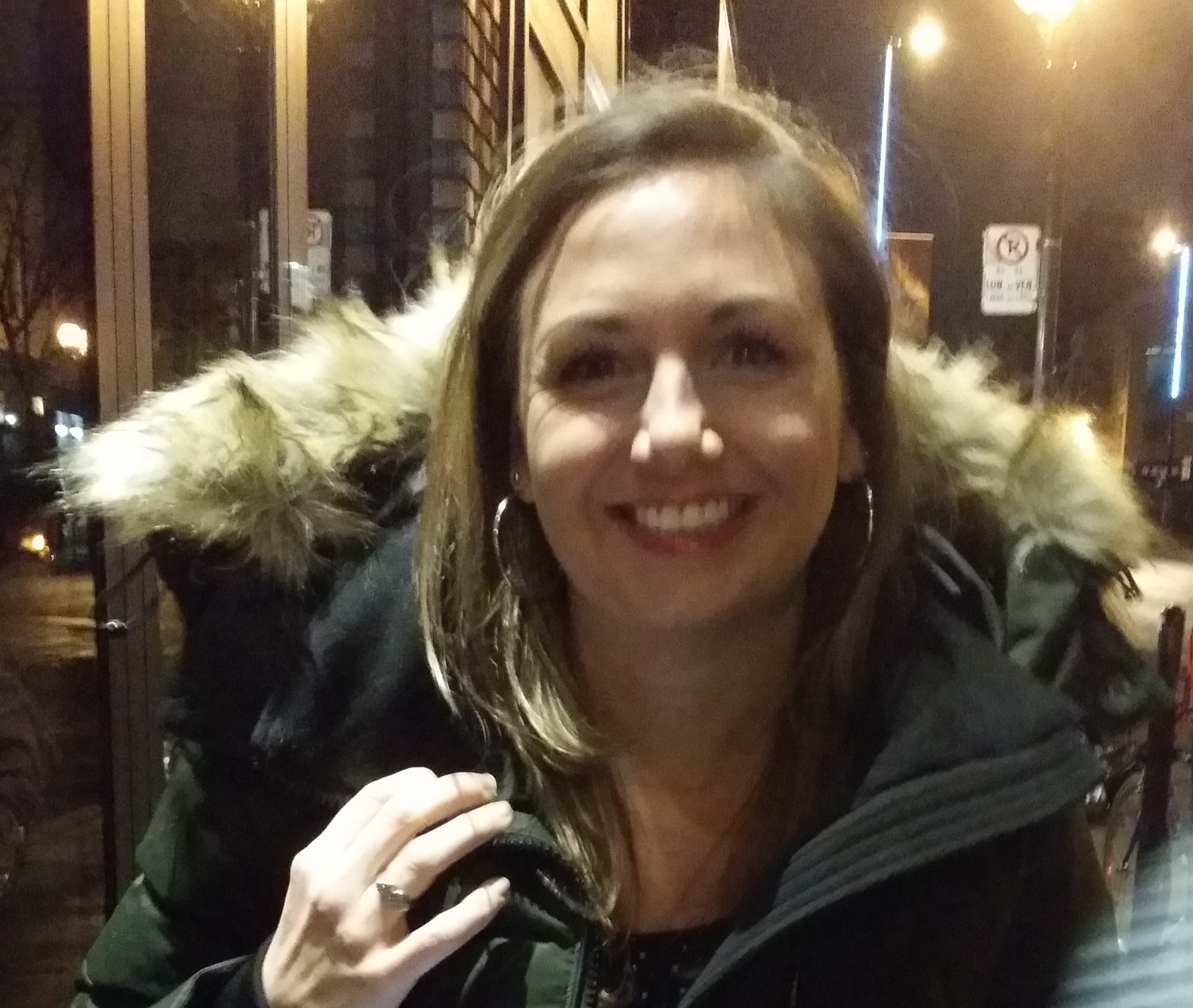

Personal information
- Nationality: Canada
- Born: November 26, 1985 (age 40) Pointe-Claire, Canada
- Height: 170 cm (5 ft 7 in)
- Weight: 56 kg (123 lb)

Sport
- Sport: Swimming
- Strokes: Synchronized swimming
- Club: Synchro Élite
Medal record
Representing Canada
Synchronized swimming
World Championships
Bronze medal – third place	2011 Shanghai	Free routine combination
Pan American Games
Silver medal – second place	2007 Rio de Janeiro	Team
Gold medal – first place	2011 Guadalajara	Team

Tracy Little (born November 26, 1985, in Pointe-Claire, Quebec, Canada) is a Canadian synchronized swimmer.

== Career ==
Little won two Pan American Games medals in the team event, a silver in 2007 and a gold in 2011. Little competed for Canada in the women's team event at the 2008 and 2012 Summer Olympics, both times coming in fourth place. After the latter games, Tracy announced her retirement from competitive sport.

== Honours ==
In 2012 Little was a recipient of the Queen Elizabeth II Diamond Jubilee Medal.
