= Nikita Pablo =

Australian synchronized swimmer

Personal information
- Born: 8 January 1995 (age 31)

Sport
- Country: Australia
- Sport: Synchronized swimming

Nikita Pablo (born 8 January 1995) is an Australian synchronized swimmer. She competed in the women's duet at the 2016 Summer Olympics.
