= Stéphanie Leclair =

Canadian synchronized swimmer

Personal information
- Nationality: Canada
- Born: 15 January 1990 (age 36) Gatineau, Quebec, Canada
- Height: 1.72 m (5 ft 8 in)
- Weight: 54 kg (119 lb)

Sport
- Sport: Swimming
- Strokes: Synchronized swimming
- Club: Synchro Canada
Medal record
Representing Canada
Synchronized swimming
Pan American Games
Gold medal – first place	2011 Guadalajara	Women's team
FINA World Aquatics Championships
Bronze medal – third place	2009 Rome	Free routine combination
Bronze medal – third place	2011 Shanghai	Free routine combination
- Updated on 25 May 2015

Stéphanie Leclair (born 15 January 1990) is a Canadian synchronized swimmer. She competed in the women's team event at the 2012 Olympic Games.
