= Bia and Branca Feres =

Brazilian synchronized swimmers (born 1988)

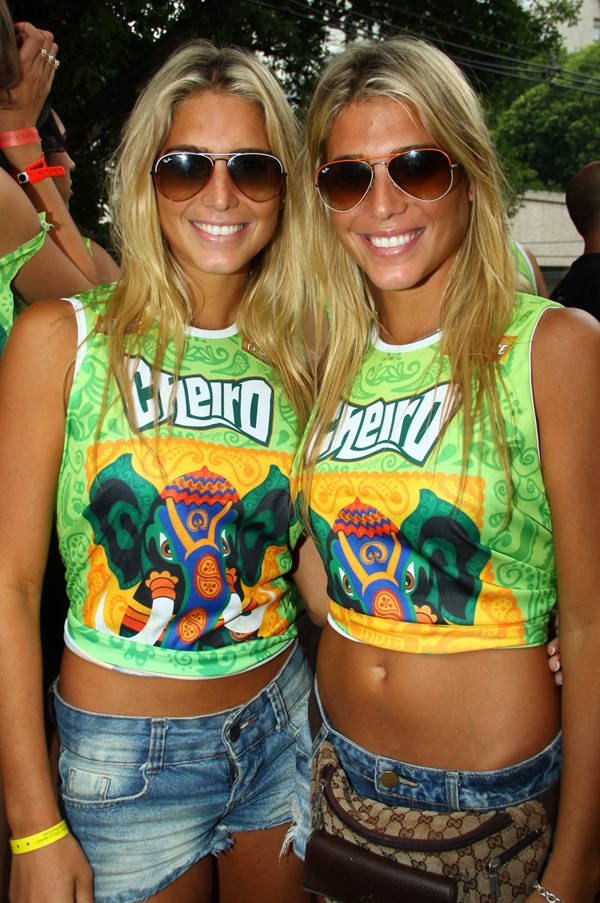
- The Feres sisters in 2012.

Personal information
- Full name: Beatriz Moreira Feres and Branca Moreira Feres
- National team: Brazil
- Born: February 22, 1988 (age 38)

Sport
- Sport: Swimming
- Strokes: Synchronised swimming
Medal record
Women's synchronized swimming
Representing Brazil
South American Games
Gold medal – first place	2010 Medellín	Women's team
Pan American Games
Bronze medal – third place	2007 Rio de Janeiro	Women's team

Beatriz Feres and Branca Feres (born February 22, 1988, in Brazil) are Brazilian synchronized swimmers, models, and actresses. They are identical twins.

== Swimming ==
The Feres sisters began practicing swimming and gymnastics at the age of three, and took up synchronized swimming at the age of seven. They went on to become Brazilian champions in both the juvenile and adult categories, and secured second place at the 2005 Pan American Junior Games held in Orlando, Florida.

The Feres sisters competed for Brazil in the 2007 Pan American Games in synchronized swimming and won a bronze medal. They were both part of the team that won the gold medal at the 2010 South American Games for women's team synchronized swimming. They were also both part of the Brazilian team that competed in the Women's team synchronized swimming at the 2016 Summer Olympics.

== Modeling and acting ==
The Feres sisters are also models and have appeared in a number of photo shoots, including one for Brazilian magazine VIP in July 2008, where they appeared on the cover.
