= Etel Sánchez =

Argentine synchronized swimmer

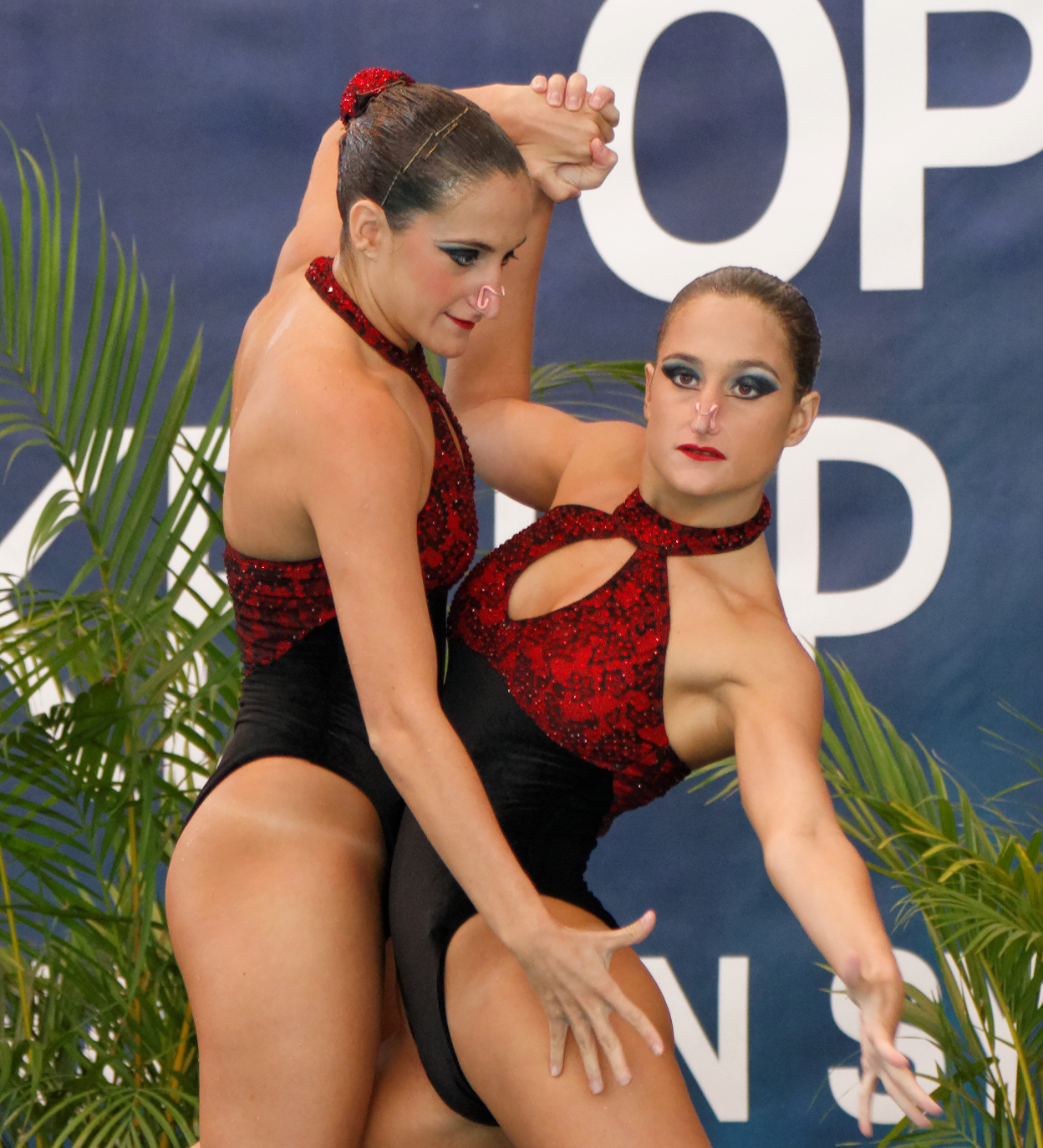
- Etel and Sofía Sánchez at the 2013 French Open

Personal information
- Nationality: Argentina
- Born: 23 August 1989 (age 36) Rosario, Argentina
- Height: 172 cm (5 ft 8 in)

Sport
- Sport: Swimming
- Strokes: Synchronized swimming
Medal record
Representing Argentina
Synchronized swimming
South American Games
Bronze medal – third place	2010 Medellin	Women's solo
Bronze medal – third place	2010 Medellin	Women's duet
Bronze medal – third place	2010 Medellin	Women's team
- Updated on 23 May 2015

Etel Sánchez (born 23 August 1989) is an Argentine synchronized swimmer.

Etel competed in the women's duet at the 2012 Summer Olympics with her twin sister Sofía and finished in 22nd place. They were the first Argentine pair to compete in the duet at the Olympics. She also competed at the 2016 Summer Olympics with her sister and finished in 19th place. She and Sofia were born as a set of triplets with their brother Thomas who plays waterpolo.

== Career records ==
Solo

- 2010, South American Games, 3rd

Duet

- 2010, South American Games, 3rd
- 2011, Pan American Games, 6th

Duet technical routine

- 2013, World Aquatics Championships, 15th

Team

- 2010, South American Games, 3rd
- 2011, Pan American Games, 6th
