= Lara Teixeira =

Brazilian synchronized swimmer

Personal information
- Full name: Lara Puglia Teixeira Cianciarulo
- Nationality: Brazil
- Born: 26 November 1987 (age 38) Rio de Janeiro, Brazil
- Height: 1.67 m (5 ft 6 in)
- Weight: 57 kg (126 lb)

Sport
- Sport: Swimming
- Strokes: Synchronized swimming
- Club: Tijuca Tennis Club
Medal record
Synchronized swimming
Representing Brazil
South American Games
Gold medal – first place	2010 Medellin	Duet free
Gold medal – first place	2010 Medellin	Team free
Pan American Games
Bronze medal – third place	2007 Rio de Janeiro	Women's duet
Bronze medal – third place	2007 Rio de Janeiro	Women's team
Bronze medal – third place	2011 Guadalajara	Women's duet
Bronze medal – third place	2011 Guadalajara	Women's team
- Updated on 22 May 2015

Lara Puglia•Teixeira Cianciarulo (born 26 November 1987) is a Brazilian synchronized swimmer. She competed in the women's duet at the 2008 and 2012 Summer Olympics and was part of the Brazilian team at the 2016 Summer Olympics. Her partner in 2008 and 2012 was Nayara Figueria. The team of Teixeira and Figueria were known for their innovative choreography and irreverent costumes. In total, Teixeira competed at 3 Olympic Games, 5 World Championships and 3 Pan American Games.

== Career ==
Teixeira took up synchronised swimming at the age of 8, and began to compete for Brazil two years later. She was inspired by Camille Mourão, another Brazilian synchronised swimmer. Her other role model is Gemma Mengual.

In 2007, she won a bronze at the Pan American Games, held in Rio. She also first teamed up with Figueria in this year, so their team only had a year's worth of experience when they competed at the 2008 Summer Olympics. The Brazilian duet pair did not reach the final, finishing in 13th place.

At the 2009 World Aquatic Championships, the pair made the final, finishing in 11th.

At the 2012 Olympics, the team of Teixeria and Figueria missed the final by only 0.3 points. Their technical routine costumes were in the style of Romero Brito and their music was by Arnaldo Antunes. That year, Teixeria created an academy to help develop the sport of synchronised swimming in Brazil. The team also won gold at the South American Synchronised Swimming Championships.

She was appointed as an ambassador for the Youth Olympics for the 2014 Youth Olympics in Nanjing. At the time, she was not part of the Brazilian Olympic team, and she said the experience inspired her to fight harder and win a place in the team.

She has the Olympic rings tattooed on her shoulder.

She spent 3 years as the head coach of the New Zealand National Synchronised Swimming Team.

Now she is the High Performance Manager, and Assistant Junior National Team Coach for the US synchronised swimming team.
