= Lorena Molinos =

Brazilian synchronised swimmer

Personal information
- Born: 2 March 1991 (age 35) Rio de Janeiro, Brazil

Sport
- Sport: Synchronised swimming
Medal record
Representing Brazil
Pan American Games
| Bronze medal – third place | 2011 Guadalajara | Team |
South American Games
| Gold medal – first place | 2010 Medellin | Team |

Lorena Fontes Molinos (born 2 March 1991) is a Brazilian synchronised swimmer. She competed in the team event at the 2016 Summer Olympics.
