= Sofía Sánchez (synchronized swimmer) =

Argentine synchronized swimmer

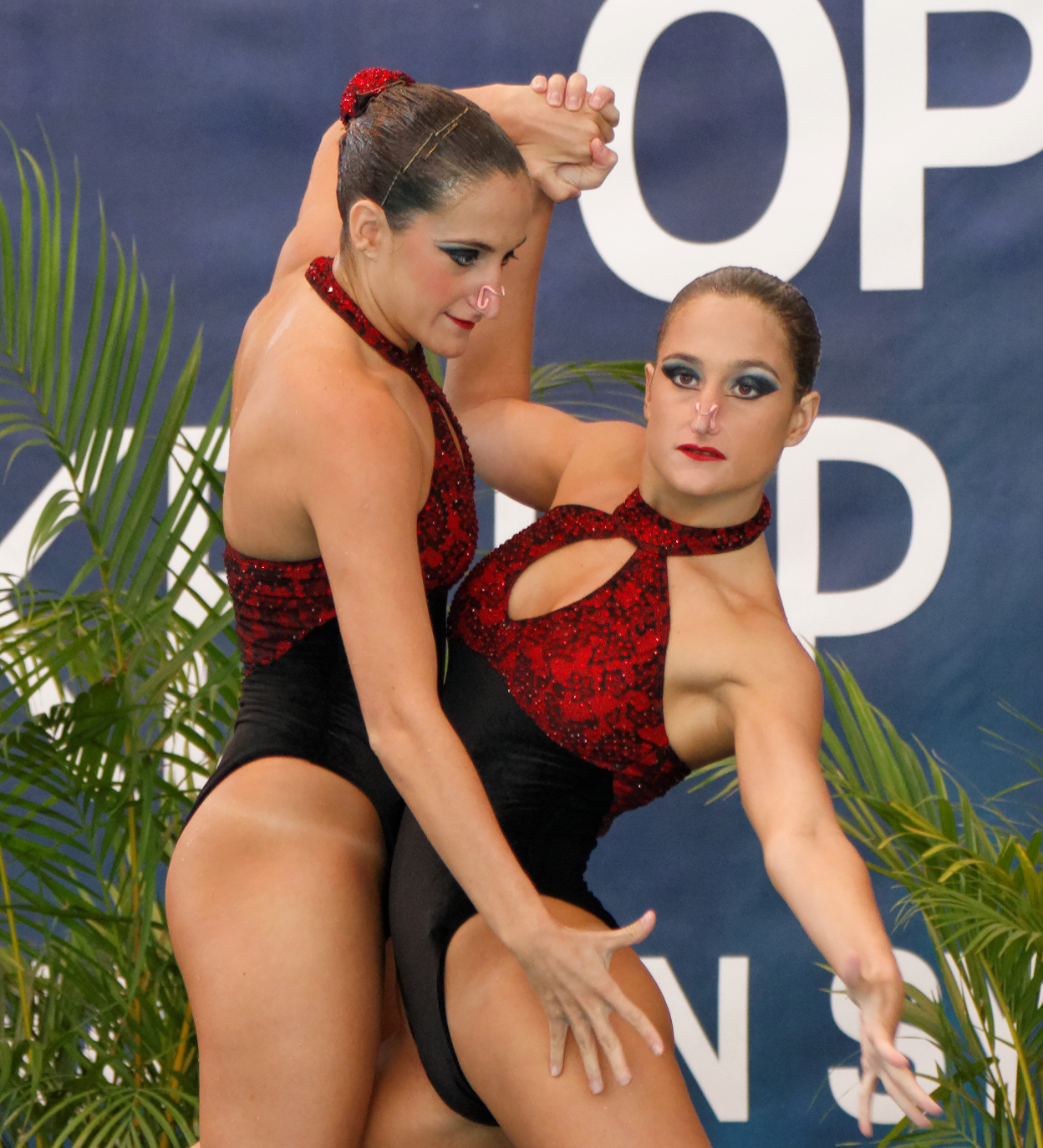
- Etel and Sofía Sánchez at the 2013 French Open

Personal information
- Nationality: Argentina
- Born: 23 August 1989 (age 36) Rosario, Argentina
- Height: 171 cm (5 ft 7 in)

Sport
- Sport: Swimming
- Strokes: Synchronized swimming
Medal record
Representing Argentina
Synchronized swimming
South American Games
Bronze medal – third place	2010 Medellin	Women's duet
Bronze medal – third place	2010 Medellin	Women's team

Sofía Sánchez (born 23 August 1989) is an Argentine synchronized swimmer.

Sofía competed in the women's duet at the 2012 Summer Olympics with her twin sister Etel and finished in 22nd place. She also competed at the 2016 Summer Olympics with her sister and finished in 19th place. She and Etel were born as a set of triplets with their brother Thomas who plays volleyball.
