= Anouk Eman =

Aruban model and beauty queen

- Born: 3 February 1992 (age 34); Aruba
- Height: 1.80 m (5 ft 11 in)
- Beauty pageant titleholder
- Title: Miss Universe Aruba 2024
- Major competitions: Miss World 2017 (Unplaced); Miss International 2018 (Unplaced); Miss Universe Aruba 2024 (Winner); Miss Universe 2024 (Top 30)

Anouk Eman (born 1992) is an Aruban psychologist, swimmer, model and beauty pageant titleholder who was crowned Miss Universe Aruba 2024 and represented her country at Miss Universe 2024 pageant in Mexico in November, where she became a Top 30 semi-finalist. She had also represented Aruba at Miss World 2017 and Miss International 2018 contests.

== Pageantry ==
=== Miss Universe Aruba 2024 ===
Eman was crowned Miss Universe Aruba 2024 in a pageant held on Saturday, August 10 at the Aruba Marriott Grand Ballroom. She represented Aruba at Miss Universe 2024 and made the top 30.

Awards and achievements
| Preceded by Karol Croes | Miss Universe Aruba; 2024 | Succeeded by Incumbent |
