= Marie-Pier Boudreau Gagnon =

Canadian synchronized swimmer

Personal information
- Nationality: Canada
- Born: March 3, 1983 (age 43) Rivière-du-Loup, Quebec, Canada
- Height: 171 cm (5 ft 7 in)
- Weight: 56 kg (123 lb)

Sport
- Sport: Synchronized swimming
- Club: Montréal Synchro Club
Medal record
Representing Canada
Synchronized swimming
World Championships
| Bronze medal – third place | 2009 Rome | Solo technical routine |
| Bronze medal – third place | 2009 Rome | Free routine combination |
| Bronze medal – third place | 2011 Shanghai | Free routine combination |
Commonwealth Games
| Gold medal – first place | 2006 Melbourne | Solo |
| Gold medal – first place | 2006 Melbourne | Duet |
| Gold medal – first place | 2010 Delhi | Solo |
| Gold medal – first place | 2010 Delhi | Duet |
Pan American Games
| Gold medal – first place | 2011 Guadalajara | Duet |
| Gold medal – first place | 2011 Guadalajara | Team |
| Silver medal – second place | 2007 Rio | Duet |
| Silver medal – second place | 2007 Rio | Team |

Marie-Pier Boudreau Gagnon (born March 3, 1983, in Rivière-du-Loup, Quebec) is a Canadian synchronized swimmer and four times Commonwealth Games gold medalist.

== Career ==
She first became interested in synchronized swimming at the age of seven after watching Sylvie Fréchette on television, and has been a member of Synchro Canada's national team since 1998.

Marie-Pier represented Canada in the women's solo event at the 2005 FINA World Championships in Montreal. At the 2006 Commonwealth Games Gagnon won two gold medals in the women's solo and women's duet (with Isabelle Rampling). She repeated this feat at the following Commonwealth Games with a further two golds.

At the 2008 Summer Olympics, Marie-Pier finished in sixth place with partner Isabelle Rampling in the women's duet. She returned to the 2012 Summer Olympics where an improved performance in the women's duet saw her finish in fourth place with Élise Marcotte.

Shortly after the London Olympics, Boudreau Gagnon announced her retirement from competitive sports.

After her retirement, Boudreau Gagnon returned to Rivière-du-Loup and became a pharmacist.
