= Élise Marcotte =

Canadian synchronized swimmer

Personal information
- Nationality: Canada
- Born: September 27, 1988 (age 37) Quebec City, Quebec, Canada
- Height: 171 cm (5 ft 7 in)
- Weight: 56 kg (123 lb)

Sport
- Sport: Swimming
- Strokes: Synchronized swimming
- Club: Synchro Elite de Quebec (Quebec Excellence Synchro)
Medal record
Representing Canada
Synchronized swimming
World Championships
Bronze medal – third place	2009 Rome	Free routine combination
Bronze medal – third place	2011 Shanghai	Free routine combination
Pan American Games
Silver medal – second place	2007 Rio de Janeiro	Team
Gold medal – first place	2011 Guadalajara	Duet
Gold medal – first place	2011 Guadalajara	Team

Élise Marcotte (born September 27, 1988) was a Canadian synchronized swimmer who competed in the 2008 and 2012 Summer Olympics.

== Career ==
Marcotte was a double gold medallist at the 2011 Pan American Games in Guadalajara in the team event and in the duet event with partner Marie-Pier Boudreau Gagnon. She was a two time Olympian, placing fourth in the team event in Beijing and fourth in both duet and team in London. Shortly after the London Olympics, Marcotte announced her retirement from competitive sports.

Fluently bilingual, Marcotte holds an undergraduate degree in marketing from Université du Québec à Montréal (UQAM) that she completed between Beijing and London Olympics and a Masters in Marketing from HEC Montréal, completed in a record of under 16 months. Upon retirement from the National Team in 2012, she was Vice-President, Marketing at a start-up company, Mission Graduation, and launched Synchro Academy. It was there that Marcotte started an initiative that allowedOlympians to give back through a series of seminars nationally and internationally. Elise is a certified NCCP coach in the Competition-Development context for synchronized swimming, she is also a member of the Board of Directors for the Coaching Association of Canada. Marcotte was the Deputy Chef de Mission for Team Canada at the Pan American Games in Toronto in 2015 beside Curt Harnett. She joined Game Plan, Canada's total athlete Wellness program in 2015.

== Honours ==
In 2012 the city of L'Ancienne-Lorette named an aquatics centre in her honour.
