= Japan at the 2017 World Aquatics Championships =

- Flag of Japan
- World Aquatics code: JPN
- National federation: Japan Swimming Federation
- Website: www.swim.or.jp

in Budapest, Hungary
- Competitors: 77 in 5 sports
- Medals Ranked 17th: Gold 0 Silver 4 Bronze 5 Total 9

World Aquatics Championships appearances
- 1973; 1975; 1978; 1982; 1986; 1991; 1994; 1998; 2001; 2003; 2005; 2007; 2009; 2011; 2013; 2015; 2017; 2019; 2022; 2023; 2024; 2025

Japan competed at the 2017 World Aquatics Championships in Budapest, Hungary from 14 July to 30 July.

== Medalists ==
Medal	Name	Sport	Event	Date
Silver	Yui Ohashi	Swimming	Women's 200 m individual medley	July 24
Silver	Kosuke Hagino	Swimming	Men's 200 m individual medley	July 27
Silver	Yasuhiro Koseki	Swimming	Men's 200 m breaststroke	July 28
Silver	Junya Koga	Swimming	Men's 50 m backstroke	July 30
Bronze	Sakiko Akutsu; Juka Fukumura; Aiko Hayashi; Yukiko Inui; Minami Kono; Kei Marumo; Kanami Nakamaki; Mai Nakamura; Kano Omata; Asuka Tasaki	Synchronized swimming	Women's team technical routine	July 18
Bronze	Sakiko Akutsu; Juka Fukumura; Aiko Hayashi; Yukiko Inui; Minami Kono; Kei Marumo; Kanami Nakamaki; Mai Nakamura; Kano Omata; Yuriko Osawa; Asuka Tasaki; Maiko Yamazaki	Synchronized swimming	Women's free routine combination	July 22
Bronze	Daiya Seto	Swimming	Men's 200 m butterfly	July 26
Bronze	Ippei Watanabe	Swimming	Men's 200 m breaststroke	July 28
Bronze	Daiya Seto	Swimming	Men's 400 m individual medley	July 30

== Diving ==
Japan has entered 5 divers (two male and three female).

Men

Athlete	Event	Preliminaries		Semifinals		Final	
Athlete	Event	Points	Rank	Points	Rank	Points	Rank
Sho Sakai	3 m springboard	445.65	6 Q	407.80	13	did not advance	
Kazuki Murakami	10 m platform	349.70	28	did not advance			

Women

Athlete	Event	Preliminaries		Semifinals		Final	
Athlete	Event	Points	Rank	Points	Rank	Points	Rank
Minami Itahashi	10 m platform	304.00	15 Q	313.70	12 Q	357.85	7
Nana Sasaki	10 m platform	274.80	24	did not advance			
Matsuri Arai; Nana Sasaki	10 m synchronized platform	280.44	10 Q	—N/a		283.32	10

Mixed

Athlete	Event	Final	
Athlete	Event	Points	Rank
Minami Itahashi; Kazuki Murakami	10 m synchronized platform	307.74	6

== Open water swimming ==
Japan has entered six open water swimmers

Athlete	Event	Time	Rank
Yasunari Hirai	Men's 5 km	55:33.3	33
Yasunari Hirai	Men's 10 km	1:54:52.9	40
Yohsuke Miyamoto	Men's 5 km	55:38.0	34
Yohsuke Miyamoto	Men's 25 km	5:11:32.1	15
Taiki Nonaka	Men's 10 km	1:55:14.1	44
Taiki Nonaka	Men's 25 km	5:13:35.5	19
Yumi Kida	Women's 10 km	2:03:06.6	23
Yumi Kida	Women's 25 km	5:39:31.5	15
Yukimi Moriyama	Women's 5 km	1:01:14.5	21
Yukimi Moriyama	Women's 10 km	2:02:13.3	20
Minami Niikura	Women's 5 km	1:00:55.0	16
Yukimi Moriyama; Minami Niikura; Yasunari Hirai; Yohsuke Miyamoto	Mixed team	55:54.0	9

== Swimming ==
Japanese swimmers have achieved qualifying standards in the following events (up to a maximum of 2 swimmers in each event at the A-standard entry time, and 1 at the B-standard):

Men

Athlete	Event	Heat		Semifinal		Final	
Athlete	Event	Time	Rank	Time	Rank	Time	Rank
Naito Ehara	200 m freestyle	1:47.31	15 Q	1:47.36	15	did not advance	
Kosuke Hagino	200 m backstroke	1:57.97	12 Q	1:58.72	14	did not advance	
Kosuke Hagino	200 m individual medley	1:56.46	1 Q	1:56.04	2 Q	1:56.01	2nd place, silver medalist(s)
Kosuke Hagino	400 m individual medley	4:14.15	7 Q	—N/a		4:12.65	6
Ryosuke Irie	100 m backstroke	53.54	5 Q	53.02	4 Q	53.03	4
Ryosuke Irie	200 m backstroke	1:57.21	6 Q	1:55.79	6 Q	1:56.35	7
Yuki Kobori	100 m butterfly	52.17	20	did not advance			
Junya Koga	50 m backstroke	24.54	1 Q	24.44	2 Q	24.51	2nd place, silver medalist(s)
Yasuhiro Koseki	50 m breaststroke	27.21 AS	10 Q	27.17 AS	11	did not advance	
Yasuhiro Koseki	100 m breaststroke	59.76	11 Q	59.18	6 Q	59.10	4
Yasuhiro Koseki	200 m breaststroke	2:10.38	12 Q	2:07.80	4 Q	2:07.29	2nd place, silver medalist(s)
Katsuhiro Matsumoto	200 m freestyle	1:47.92	27	did not advance			
Katsumi Nakamura	50 m freestyle	22.32	23	did not advance			
Katsumi Nakamura	100 m freestyle	49.10	28	did not advance			
Masato Sakai	200 m butterfly	1:55.94	6 Q	1:55.57	7 Q	1:55.04	6
Daiya Seto	200 m butterfly	1:54.89	2 Q	1:54.03	1 Q	1:54.21	3rd place, bronze medalist(s)
Daiya Seto	200 m individual medley	1:57.55	4 Q	1:56.92	5 Q	1:56.97	5
Daiya Seto	400 m individual medley	4:12.89	4 Q	—N/a		4:09.14	3rd place, bronze medalist(s)
Shinri Shioura	50 m freestyle	22.17	15 Q	22.02	14	did not advance	
Shinri Shioura	100 m freestyle	48.46	=5 Q	48.54	11	did not advance	
Ippei Watanabe	100 m breaststroke	1:00.26	22	did not advance			
Ippei Watanabe	200 m breaststroke	2:09.30	3 Q	2:07.44	2 Q	2:07.47	3rd place, bronze medalist(s)
Junya Koga; Katsuhiro Matsumoto; Katsumi Nakamura; Shinri Shioura	4×100 m freestyle relay	3:14.82	7 Q	—N/a		3:13.65	5
Tsubasa Amai; Naito Ehara; Kosuke Hagino; Katsuhiro Matsumoto	4×200 m freestyle relay	7:09.66	6 Q	—N/a		7:07.68	5
Ryosuke Irie; Yuki Kobori; Yasuhiro Koseki; Shinri Shioura	4×100 m medley relay	3:31.63	2 Q	—N/a		3:30.19 AS	4

Women

Athlete	Event	Heat		Semifinal		Final	
Athlete	Event	Time	Rank	Time	Rank	Time	Rank
Reona Aoki	100 m breaststroke	1:07.48	17 q	1:07.43	14	did not advance	
Reona Aoki	200 m breaststroke	2:25.93	12 Q	2:24.42	10	did not advance	
Tomomi Aoki	100 m freestyle	1:59.44	23	did not advance			
Suzuka Hasegawa	200 m butterfly	2:09.10	12 Q	2:07.01	4 Q	2:07.43	6
Chihiro Igarashi	200 m freestyle	1:57.67	11 Q	1:57.96	13	did not advance	
Rikako Ikee	50 m freestyle	25.04	16 Q	24.94	16	did not advance	
Rikako Ikee	100 m freestyle	54.91	21	did not advance			
Rikako Ikee	50 m butterfly	25.72	3 Q	25.90	13	did not advance	
Rikako Ikee	100 m butterfly	57.45	4 Q	56.89	4 Q	57.08	6
Runa Imai	200 m individual medley	2:11.15	5 Q	2:10.15	7 Q	2:09.99	5
Hiroko Makino	200 m butterfly	2:09.14	15 Q	2:07.95	10	did not advance	
Yui Ohashi	200 m individual medley	2:11.44	8 Q	2:10.45	8 Q	2:07.91 NR	2nd place, silver medalist(s)
Yui Ohashi	400 m individual medley	4:36.97	7 Q	—N/a		4:34.50	4
Sakiko Shimizu	400 m individual medley	4:36.43	5 Q	—N/a		4:35.62	5
Satomi Suzuki	50 m breaststroke	30.95	14 Q	30.95	13	did not advance	
Satomi Suzuki	100 m breaststroke	1:07.20	=10 Q	1:07.08	11	did not advance	
Satomi Suzuki	200 m breaststroke	2:26.78	15 Q	2:25.60	12	did not advance	
Tomomi Aoki; Chihiro Igarashi; Rikako Ikee; Yui Yamane	4×100 m freestyle relay	3:37.46	7 Q	—N/a		3:38.24	7
Tomomi Aoki; Chihiro Igarashi; Rikako Ikee; Aya Takano	4×200 m freestyle relay	7:53.67	2 Q	—N/a		7:50.43	5

Mixed

Athlete	Event	Heat		Final	
Athlete	Event	Time	Rank	Time	Rank
Katsuhiro Matsumoto; Katsumi Nakamura; Tomomi Aoki*; Rikako Ikee; Shinri Shioura	4×100 m freestyle relay	3:26.91 AS	6 Q	3:24.78 AS	4
Runa Imai; Sakiko Shimizu; Tsubasa Amai; Junya Koga	4×100 m medley relay	3:53.79	10	did not advance	

== Synchronized swimming ==
Japan's synchronized swimming team consisted of 14 athletes (1 male and 13 female).

Women

Athlete	Event	Preliminaries		Final	
Athlete	Event	Points	Rank	Points	Rank
Yukiko Inui	Solo technical routine	90.8837	3 Q	91.7490	4
Yukiko Inui	Solo free routine	91.9667	4 Q	92.0667	4
Yukiko Inui; Mai Nakamura; Kanami Nakamaki (R)	Duet technical routine	90.1304	4 Q	92.0572	4
Yukiko Inui; Kanami Nakamaki; Mai Nakamura (R)	Duet free routine	92.6000	4 Q	93.1333	4
Sakiko Akutsu; Juka Fukumura; Aiko Hayashi (R); Yukiko Inui; Minami Kono; Kei Marumo; Kanami Nakamaki; Mai Nakamura; Kano Omata; Asuka Tasaki (R)	Team technical routine	91.7484	3 Q	93.1590	3rd place, bronze medalist(s)
Sakiko Akutsu; Juka Fukumura; Aiko Hayashi; Yukiko Inui; Minami Kono (R); Kei Marumo; Kanami Nakamaki; Mai Nakamura; Kano Omata; Asuka Tasaki (R)	Team free routine	92.4667	4 Q	93.1000	4
Sakiko Akutsu; Juka Fukumura; Aiko Hayashi (R); Yukiko Inui; Minami Kono; Kei Marumo; Kanami Nakamaki; Mai Nakamura; Kano Omata; Yuriko Osawa; Asuka Tasaki; Maiko Yamazaki (R)	Free routine combination	92.9667	3 Q	93.2000	3rd place, bronze medalist(s)

Mixed

Athlete	Event	Preliminaries		Final	
Athlete	Event	Points	Rank	Points	Rank
Atsushi Abe; Yumi Adachi	Duet technical routine	84.8153	4 Q	86.2679	4
Atsushi Abe; Yumi Adachi	Duet free routine	86.9333	4 Q	88.0000	4

Legend: (R) = Reserve Athlete

== Water polo ==
Japan qualified both a men's and women's teams.

=== Men's tournament ===
Team roster

- Katsuyuki Tanamura
- Seiya Adachi
- Shuma Kawamoto
- Mitsuaki Shiga
- Takuma Yoshida
- Atsuto Iida
- Yusuke Shimizu (C)
- Mitsuru Takata
- Atsushi Arai
- Kohei Inaba
- Keigo Okawa
- Kenya Araki
- Tomoyoshi Fukushima

Group play

Pos	Team	Pld	W	D	L	GF	GA	GD	Pts	Qualification
1	Croatia	3	3	0	0	38	21	+17	6	Quarterfinals
2	Russia	3	1	0	2	34	32	+2	2 (Note: Russia 2 Pts, +4 GD; Japan 2 Pts, +1 GD; United States 2 Pts, −5 GD)	Playoffs
3	Japan	3	1	0	2	29	38	−9	2	Playoffs
4	United States	3	1	0	2	28	38	−10	2	

Source: Sportresult
Rules for classification: 1) points; 2) head-to-head points; 3) head-to-head goal difference; 4) head-to-head number of goals scored; 5) better result against higher placed team.
Notes:

17 July 2017; 21:30	Report	Japan	8–15	Russia	Alfréd Hajós National Swimming Stadium, Budapest; Referees: Daniel Flahive (AUS), Stanko Ivanovski (MNE)
17 July 2017; 21:30	Report	Score by quarters: 1–5, 2–3, 2–3, 3–4			Alfréd Hajós National Swimming Stadium, Budapest; Referees: Daniel Flahive (AUS), Stanko Ivanovski (MNE)
17 July 2017; 21:30	Report	three players 2	Goals	four players 3	Alfréd Hajós National Swimming Stadium, Budapest; Referees: Daniel Flahive (AUS), Stanko Ivanovski (MNE)

19 July 2017; 17:30	Report	United States	7–15	Japan	Alfréd Hajós National Swimming Stadium, Budapest; Referees: Daniel Flahive (AUS), Benjamin Mercier (FRA)
19 July 2017; 17:30	Report	Score by quarters: 2–1, 2–5, 2–4, 1–5			Alfréd Hajós National Swimming Stadium, Budapest; Referees: Daniel Flahive (AUS), Benjamin Mercier (FRA)
19 July 2017; 17:30	Report	Dunstan, Hallock 2	Goals	Adachi 7	Alfréd Hajós National Swimming Stadium, Budapest; Referees: Daniel Flahive (AUS), Benjamin Mercier (FRA)

21 July 2017; 13:30	Report	Japan	6–16	Croatia	Alfréd Hajós National Swimming Stadium, Budapest; Referees: Daniel Flahive (AUS), Benjamin Mercier (FRA)
21 July 2017; 13:30	Report	Score by quarters: 1–5, 3–5, 1–4, 1–2			Alfréd Hajós National Swimming Stadium, Budapest; Referees: Daniel Flahive (AUS), Benjamin Mercier (FRA)
21 July 2017; 13:30	Report	Arai 2	Goals	four players 3	Alfréd Hajós National Swimming Stadium, Budapest; Referees: Daniel Flahive (AUS), Benjamin Mercier (FRA)

Playoffs

23 July 2017; 20:30	Report	Greece	14–4	Japan	Alfréd Hajós National Swimming Stadium, Budapest; Referees: Frank Ohme (GER), Steven Rotsart (USA)
23 July 2017; 20:30	Report	Score by quarters: 5–2, 5–0, 2–2, 2–0			Alfréd Hajós National Swimming Stadium, Budapest; Referees: Frank Ohme (GER), Steven Rotsart (USA)
23 July 2017; 20:30	Report	Fountoulis 4	Goals	Adachi 2	Alfréd Hajós National Swimming Stadium, Budapest; Referees: Frank Ohme (GER), Steven Rotsart (USA)

9th–12th place semifinals

25 July 2017; 12:10	Report	Brazil	7–9	Japan	Alfréd Hajós National Swimming Stadium, Budapest; Referees: Diana Dutilh-Dumas (NED), Radosław Koryzna (POL)
25 July 2017; 12:10	Report	Score by quarters: 1–3, 3–4, 1–1, 2–1			Alfréd Hajós National Swimming Stadium, Budapest; Referees: Diana Dutilh-Dumas (NED), Radosław Koryzna (POL)
25 July 2017; 12:10	Report	Coutinho, Freitas 2	Goals	Adachi 3	Alfréd Hajós National Swimming Stadium, Budapest; Referees: Diana Dutilh-Dumas (NED), Radosław Koryzna (POL)

Ninth place game

27 July 2017; 12:00	Report	Japan	11–13	Spain	Alfréd Hajós National Swimming Stadium, Budapest; Referees: Stanko Ivanovski (MNE), Viktor Salnichenko (KAZ)
27 July 2017; 12:00	Report	Score by quarters: 2–1, 4–6, 3–4, 2–2			Alfréd Hajós National Swimming Stadium, Budapest; Referees: Stanko Ivanovski (MNE), Viktor Salnichenko (KAZ)
27 July 2017; 12:00	Report	Adachi, Okawa 3	Goals	Español 5	Alfréd Hajós National Swimming Stadium, Budapest; Referees: Stanko Ivanovski (MNE), Viktor Salnichenko (KAZ)

=== Women's tournament ===
Team roster

- Miyuu Aoki
- Yumi Arima
- Yuri Kazama
- Shino Magariyama
- Chiaki Sakanoue
- Minori Yamamoto
- Akari Inaba
- Yuki Niizawa
- Kana Hosoya
- Misaki Noro
- Marina Tokumoto
- Kotori Suzuki (C)
- Minami Shioya

Group play

Pos	Team	Pld	W	D	L	GF	GA	GD	Pts	Qualification
1	Hungary (H)	3	3	0	0	54	24	+30	6	Quarterfinals
2	Netherlands	3	2	0	1	45	20	+25	4	Playoffs
3	France	3	1	0	2	16	49	−33	2	Playoffs
4	Japan	3	0	0	3	27	49	−22	0	

Source: Sportresult
Rules for classification: 1) points; 2) head-to-head points; 3) head-to-head goal difference; 4) head-to-head number of goals scored; 5) Goal difference.
(H) Hosts

16 July 2017; 20:10	Report	Japan	11–20	Hungary	Alfréd Hajós National Swimming Stadium, Budapest; Referees: Steven Rotsart (USA), Alessandro Severo (ITA)
16 July 2017; 20:10	Report	Score by quarters: 1–4, 3–8, 2–5, 5–3			Alfréd Hajós National Swimming Stadium, Budapest; Referees: Steven Rotsart (USA), Alessandro Severo (ITA)
16 July 2017; 20:10	Report	Arima, Yamamoto 4	Goals	Bujka 5	Alfréd Hajós National Swimming Stadium, Budapest; Referees: Steven Rotsart (USA), Alessandro Severo (ITA)

18 July 2017; 12:10	Report	Japan	8–20	Netherlands	Alfréd Hajós National Swimming Stadium, Budapest; Referees: Mikhail Dykman (CAN), Michael Brooks (NZL)
18 July 2017; 12:10	Report	Score by quarters: 0–7, 5–3, 2–5, 1–5			Alfréd Hajós National Swimming Stadium, Budapest; Referees: Mikhail Dykman (CAN), Michael Brooks (NZL)
18 July 2017; 12:10	Report	Arima 3	Goals	Van der Sloot 6	Alfréd Hajós National Swimming Stadium, Budapest; Referees: Mikhail Dykman (CAN), Michael Brooks (NZL)

20 July 2017; 09:30	Report	Japan	8–9	France	Alfréd Hajós National Swimming Stadium, Budapest; Referees: Radoslaw Koryzna (POL), Francesc Buch (ESP)
20 July 2017; 09:30	Report	Score by quarters: 3–3, 0–3, 3–1, 2–2			Alfréd Hajós National Swimming Stadium, Budapest; Referees: Radoslaw Koryzna (POL), Francesc Buch (ESP)
20 July 2017; 09:30	Report	Inaba 3	Goals	Millot 4	Alfréd Hajós National Swimming Stadium, Budapest; Referees: Radoslaw Koryzna (POL), Francesc Buch (ESP)

13th–16th place semifinals

22 July 2017; 12:00	Report	Japan	17–8	Kazakhstan	Alfréd Hajós National Swimming Stadium, Budapest; Referees: Diego Garibaldi (ARG), Michael Brooks (NZL)
22 July 2017; 12:00	Report	Score by quarters: 3–1, 2–1, 7–4, 5–2			Alfréd Hajós National Swimming Stadium, Budapest; Referees: Diego Garibaldi (ARG), Michael Brooks (NZL)
22 July 2017; 12:00	Report	Arima, Sakanoue 4	Goals	Mirshina 4	Alfréd Hajós National Swimming Stadium, Budapest; Referees: Diego Garibaldi (ARG), Michael Brooks (NZL)

13th place game

24 July 2017; 10:50	Report	Brazil	9–11	Japan	Alfréd Hajós National Swimming Stadium, Budapest; Referees: Daniel Daners (URU), Dion Willis (RSA)
24 July 2017; 10:50	Report	Score by quarters: 2–2, 2–6, 2–1, 3–2			Alfréd Hajós National Swimming Stadium, Budapest; Referees: Daniel Daners (URU), Dion Willis (RSA)
24 July 2017; 10:50	Report	Abla 4	Goals	Sakanoue 4	Alfréd Hajós National Swimming Stadium, Budapest; Referees: Daniel Daners (URU), Dion Willis (RSA)
