= Japan at the 2015 World Aquatics Championships =

- Flag of Japan
- World Aquatics code: JPN
- National federation: Japan Swimming Federation
- Website: www.swim.or.jp

in Kazan, Russia
- Competitors: 72 in 5 sports
- Medals Ranked 10th: Gold 3 Silver 1 Bronze 4 Total 8

World Aquatics Championships appearances
- 1973; 1975; 1978; 1982; 1986; 1991; 1994; 1998; 2001; 2003; 2005; 2007; 2009; 2011; 2013; 2015; 2017; 2019; 2022; 2023; 2024; 2025

Japan competed at the 2015 World Aquatics Championships in Kazan, Russia from 24 July to 9 August 2015.

== Medalists ==
Medal	Name	Sport	Event	Date
Gold	Natsumi Hoshi	Swimming	Women's 200 m butterfly	August 6
Gold	Kanako Watanabe	Swimming	Women's 200 m breaststroke	August 7
Gold	Daiya Seto	Swimming	Men's 400 m individual medley	August 9
Silver	Kanako Watanabe	Swimming	Women's 200 m individual medley	August 3
Bronze	Yukiko Inui; Risako Mitsui	Synchronized swimming	Duet technical routine	July 26
Bronze	Aika Hakoyama; Yukiko Inui; Kei Marumo; Risako Mitsui; Kanami Nakamaki; Mai Nakamura; Kano Omata; Kurumi Yoshida	Synchronized swimming	Team technical routine	July 27
Bronze	Aika Hakoyama; Aiko Hayashi; Yukiko Inui; Kei Marumo; Risako Mitsui; Kanami Nakamaki; Mai Nakamura; Kurumi Yoshida	Synchronized swimming	Team free routine	July 31
Bronze	Aika Hakoyama; Aiko Hayashi; Yukiko Inui; Kei Marumo; Risako Mitsui; Kanami Nakamaki; Mai Nakamura; Kano Omata; Asuka Tasaki; Kurumi Yoshida	Synchronized swimming	Free routine combination	August 1

== Diving ==
Japanese divers qualified for the individual spots and the synchronized teams at the World Championships.

Men

Athlete	Event	Preliminaries		Semifinals		Final	
Athlete	Event	Points	Rank	Points	Rank	Points	Rank
Sho Sakai	3 m springboard	411.10	22	Did not advance			
Ken Terauchi	3 m springboard	440.25	9 Q	463.25	10 Q	468.15	9
Takuma Hagita	10 m platform	290.70	44	Did not advance			
Yu Okamoto	10 m platform	402.10	21	Did not advance			
Sho Sakai; Ken Terauchi	3 m synchronized springboard	394.50	9 Q	—N/a		389.94	11

Women

Athlete	Event	Preliminaries		Semifinals		Final	
Athlete	Event	Points	Rank	Points	Rank	Points	Rank
Minami Itahashi	3 m springboard	235.50	35	Did not advance			
Sayaka Shibusawa	3 m springboard	289.75	14 Q	288.45	14	Did not advance	
Minami Itahashi	10 m platform	344.65	6 Q	305.30	16	Did not advance	
Nana Sasaki	10 m platform	255.10	31	Did not advance			

Mixed

Athlete	Event	Final	
Athlete	Event	Points	Rank
Yu Okamoto; Minami Itahashi	10 m synchronized platform	289.92	9

== Open water swimming ==
Japan has fielded a team of four swimmers to compete in the open water marathon. Among the official roster are 2012 Olympians Yasunari Hirai and Yumi Kida.

Athlete	Event	Time	Rank
Yasunari Hirai	Men's 10 km	1:50:28.3	11
Yōsuke Miyamoto	Men's 10 km	1:52:06.7	35
Yumi Kida	Women's 10 km	2:00:01.8	28

== Swimming ==
Japanese swimmers have achieved qualifying standards in the following events (up to a maximum of 2 swimmers in each event at the A-standard entry time, and 1 at the B-standard): Swimmers must qualify at the 2015 Japanese Championships (for pool events) to confirm their places at the Worlds.

Twenty-four swimmers have been officially nominated to the Japanese team to compete in the Worlds, including defending champion Daiya Seto in the 400 m individual medley and Olympic medalists Ryosuke Irie, Ryo Tateishi, and Natsumi Hoshi. Japan's rising superstar Kosuke Hagino was set to compete, but later withdrew from the team due to elbow fracture.

Men

Athlete	Event	Heat		Semifinal		Final	
Athlete	Event	Time	Rank	Time	Rank	Time	Rank
Tsubasa Amai	200 m freestyle	1:50.04	40	Did not advance			
Tsubasa Amai	400 m freestyle	3:52.06	35	—N/a		Did not advance	
Takuro Fujii	100 m butterfly	51.76	6 Q	51.58	9	Did not advance	
Ryosuke Irie	100 m backstroke	53.37	5 Q	53.13	4 Q	53.10	6
Ryosuke Irie	200 m backstroke	1:56.68	2 Q	1:55.76	5 Q	1:54.81	4
Masaki Kaneko	50 m backstroke	25.49	23	Did not advance			
Masaki Kaneko	100 m backstroke	54.19	17	Did not advance			
Masaki Kaneko	200 m backstroke	1:57.63	9 Q	1:57.33	10	Did not advance	
Takeshi Kawamoto	50 m butterfly	23.61	13 Q	23.74	16	Did not advance	
Takeshi Kawamoto	100 m butterfly	52.41	21	Did not advance			
Yuki Kobori	200 m freestyle	1:48.09	18	Did not advance			
Yasuhiro Koseki	50 m breaststroke	28.13	30	Did not advance			
Yasuhiro Koseki	100 m breaststroke	59.93	10 Q	1:00.31	14	Did not advance	
Yasuhiro Koseki	200 m breaststroke	2:10.47	13 Q	2:08.03	1 Q	2:09.12	5
Katsumi Nakamura	50 m freestyle	22.25	10 Q	22.15	13	Did not advance	
Katsumi Nakamura	100 m freestyle	49.07	19	Did not advance			
Masato Sakai	200 m butterfly	1:55.97	7 Q	1:54.75	3 Q	1:54.24	4
Daiya Seto	200 m butterfly	1:55.60	3 Q	1:54.95	5 Q	1:55.15	6
Daiya Seto	200 m individual medley	1:59.11	7 Q	2:00.05	14	Did not advance	
Daiya Seto	400 m individual medley	4:12.17	3 Q	—N/a		4:08.50	1st place, gold medalist(s)
Shinri Shioura	50 m freestyle	22.34	12 Q	22.08	11	Did not advance	
Shinri Shioura	100 m freestyle	48.84	14 Q	48.96	15	Did not advance	
Ryo Tateishi	100 m breaststroke	1:01.26	29	Did not advance			
Ryo Tateishi	200 m breaststroke	2:13.23	25	Did not advance			
Katsumi Nakamura; Shinri Shioura; Yuki Kobori; Takuro Fujii	4×100 m freestyle relay	3:14.76	5 Q	—N/a		3:15.04	6
Yuki Kobori; Tsubasa Amai; Naito Ehara; Daiya Seto	4×200 m freestyle relay	7:11.59	10	—N/a		Did not advance	
Takuro Fujii; Ryosuke Irie; Yasuhiro Koseki; Shinri Shioura	4×100 m medley relay	3:32.82	4 Q	—N/a		3:31.10	6

Women

Athlete	Event	Heat		Semifinal		Final	
Athlete	Event	Time	Rank	Time	Rank	Time	Rank
Sayaka Akase	100 m backstroke	1:01.62	=29	Did not advance			
Natsumi Hoshi	100 m butterfly	58.47	15 Q	58.45	14	Did not advance	
Natsumi Hoshi	200 m butterfly	2:07.97	5 Q	2:06.36	1 Q	2:05.56	1st place, gold medalist(s)
Chihiro Igarashi	200 m freestyle	1:58.31	=13 Q	1:57.75	11	Did not advance	
Chihiro Igarashi	400 m freestyle	4:13.43	20	—N/a		Did not advance	
Chihiro Igarashi	400 m individual medley	4:43.06	16	—N/a		Did not advance	
Rikako Ikee	50 m butterfly	26.66	19	Did not advance			
Rie Kaneto	50 m breaststroke	31.99	31	Did not advance			
Rie Kaneto	100 m breaststroke	1:07.71	18	Did not advance			
Rie Kaneto	200 m breaststroke	2:25.75	15 Q	2:22.88	6 Q	2:23.19	6
Yayoi Matsumoto	50 m freestyle	25.90	38	Did not advance			
Yayoi Matsumoto	100 m freestyle	55.71	32	Did not advance			
Sachi Mochida	200 m freestyle	1:59.35	20	Did not advance			
Sakiko Shimizu	200 m individual medley	2:12.27	8 Q	2:11.53	10	Did not advance	
Sakiko Shimizu	400 m individual medley	4:36.16	6 Q	—N/a		4:37.19	6
Miki Uchida	50 m freestyle	25.33	22	Did not advance			
Miki Uchida	100 m freestyle	54.22	=10 Q	54.30	12	Did not advance	
Kanako Watanabe	100 m breaststroke	1:06.81	5 Q	1:06.64	5 Q	1:06.43	4
Kanako Watanabe	200 m breaststroke	2:23.29	1 Q	2:22.15	3 Q	2:21.15	1st place, gold medalist(s)
Kanako Watanabe	200 m individual medley	2:10.37	3 Q	2:09.61	3 Q	2:08.45	2nd place, silver medalist(s)
Misaki Yamaguchi	50 m butterfly	26.68	20	Did not advance			
Miki Uchida; Rikako Ikee; Misaki Yamaguchi; Yayoi Matsumoto	4×100 m freestyle relay	3:38.47	9	—N/a		Did not advance	
Chihiro Igarashi; Rikako Ikee; Sachi Mochida; Tomomi Aoki	4×200 m freestyle relay	7:54.58	6 Q	—N/a		7:54.62	7
Sayaka Akase; Natsumi Hoshi; Miki Uchida; Kanako Watanabe	4×100 m medley relay	4:00.43	8 Q	—N/a		DSQ	

Mixed

Athlete	Event	Heat		Final	
Athlete	Event	Time	Rank	Time	Rank
Yuki Kobori; Naito Ehara; Rikako Ikee; Misaki Yamaguchi	4×100 m freestyle relay	3:28.54	10	Did not advance	

== Synchronized swimming ==
Japan fielded a full squad of twelve synchronized swimmers (one male and eleven female) to compete in each of the following events.

Women

Athlete	Event	Preliminaries		Final	
Athlete	Event	Points	Rank	Points	Rank
Yukiko Inui	Solo technical routine	89.5851	5 Q	90.7603	5
Yukiko Inui	Solo free routine	91.7333	5 Q	92.4333	5
Yukiko Inui; Risako Mitsui	Duet technical routine	90.3504	3 Q	92.0079	3rd place, bronze medalist(s)
Yukiko Inui; Risako Mitsui	Duet free routine	93.5333	3 Q	93.4333	4
Aika Hakoyama; Yukiko Inui; Kei Marumo; Risako Mitsui; Kanami Nakamaki; Mai Nakamura; Kano Omata; Kurumi Yoshida	Team technical routine	91.6516	4 Q	92.4133	3rd place, bronze medalist(s)
Aika Hakoyama; Aiko Hayashi; Yukiko Inui; Kei Marumo; Risako Mitsui; Kanami Nakamaki; Mai Nakamura; Kurumi Yoshida	Team free routine	93.7000	3 Q	93.9000	3rd place, bronze medalist(s)
Aika Hakoyama; Aiko Hayashi; Yukiko Inui; Kei Marumo; Risako Mitsui; Kanami Nakamaki; Mai Nakamura; Kano Omata; Asuka Tasaki; Kurumi Yoshida	Free routine combination	92.6000	3 Q	93.8000	3rd place, bronze medalist(s)

Mixed

Athlete	Event	Preliminaries		Final	
Athlete	Event	Points	Rank	Points	Rank
Atsushi Abe; Yumi Adachi	Duet technical routine	81.8724	5 Q	82.3509	5
Atsushi Abe; Yumi Adachi	Duet free routine	84.9667	7 Q	84.9000	7

== Water polo ==
=== Men's tournament ===
Team roster

- Katsuyuki Tanamura
- Seiya Adachi
- Atsushi Arai
- Mitsuaki Shiga
- Akira Yanase
- Atsuto Iida
- Yusuke Shimizu
- Yuki Kadono
- Koji Takei
- Kenya Yasuda
- Keigo Okawa
- Shota Hazui
- Tomoyoshi Fukushima

Group play

Pos	Team	Pld	W	D	L	GF	GA	GD	Pts	Qualification
1	Serbia	3	3	0	0	40	26	+14	6	Advanced to quarterfinals
2	Australia	3	1	1	1	24	19	+5	3	Advanced to playoffs
3	Montenegro	3	1	1	1	29	26	+3	3	Advanced to playoffs
4	Japan	3	0	0	3	23	45	−22	0	

Source: SportResult.com
Rules for classification: 1) points; 2) head-to-head points; 3) head-to-head goal difference; 4) head-to-head number of goals scored; 5) goal difference.

27 July 2015; 21:30	Report	Japan	4–10	Australia	Kazan; Attendance: 2,287; Referees: Massimiliano Caputi (ITA), Hatem Gaber (EGY)
27 July 2015; 21:30	Report	Score by quarters: 0–2, 2–2, 1–3, 1–3			Kazan; Attendance: 2,287; Referees: Massimiliano Caputi (ITA), Hatem Gaber (EGY)
27 July 2015; 21:30	Report	four players 1	Goals	Campbell 3	Kazan; Attendance: 2,287; Referees: Massimiliano Caputi (ITA), Hatem Gaber (EGY)

29 July 2015; 17:30	Report	Serbia	19–9	Japan	Kazan; Attendance: 1,016; Referees: Masoud Rezvani (IRI), Stephane Roy (CAN)
29 July 2015; 17:30	Report	Score by quarters: 2–1, 6–2, 5–3, 6–3			Kazan; Attendance: 1,016; Referees: Masoud Rezvani (IRI), Stephane Roy (CAN)
29 July 2015; 17:30	Report	Nikić 6	Goals	Okawa, Takei 3	Kazan; Attendance: 1,016; Referees: Masoud Rezvani (IRI), Stephane Roy (CAN)

31 July 2015; 13:30	Report	Japan	10–16	Montenegro	Kazan; Attendance: 640; Referees: Dion Willis (RSA), Massimiliano Caputi (ITA)
31 July 2015; 13:30	Report	Score by quarters: 2–3, 2–5, 2–5, 4–3			Kazan; Attendance: 640; Referees: Dion Willis (RSA), Massimiliano Caputi (ITA)
31 July 2015; 13:30	Report	Takei 4	Goals	Ivović, Radović 4	Kazan; Attendance: 640; Referees: Dion Willis (RSA), Massimiliano Caputi (ITA)

13th–16th place semifinals

2 August 2015; 12:10	Report	Argentina	6–14	Japan	Kazan; Attendance: 218; Referees: Viktor Salnichenko (KAZ), Hatem Gaber (EGY)
2 August 2015; 12:10	Report	Score by quarters: 0–4, 2–2, 2–4, 2–4			Kazan; Attendance: 218; Referees: Viktor Salnichenko (KAZ), Hatem Gaber (EGY)
2 August 2015; 12:10	Report	Carabantes, Demarchi 3	Goals	Takei 4	Kazan; Attendance: 218; Referees: Viktor Salnichenko (KAZ), Hatem Gaber (EGY)

13th place game

4 August 2015; 10:50	Report	Russia	9–13	Japan	Kazan; Attendance: 821; Referees: György Kun (HUN), Masoud Rezvani (IRI)
4 August 2015; 10:50	Report	Score by quarters: 4–3, 1–3, 2–5, 2–2			Kazan; Attendance: 821; Referees: György Kun (HUN), Masoud Rezvani (IRI)
4 August 2015; 10:50	Report	Bychkov 3	Goals	Okawa 3	Kazan; Attendance: 821; Referees: György Kun (HUN), Masoud Rezvani (IRI)

=== Women's tournament ===
Team roster

- Rikako Miura
- Chiaki Sakanoue
- Yuri Kazama
- Shino Magariyama
- Moe Nakata
- Ayaka Takahashi
- Yumi Nakano
- Mitsuki Hashiguchi
- Kana Hosoya
- Tsubasa Mori
- Marina Tokumoto
- Kotori Suzuki
- Yuko Umeda

Group play

Pos	Team	Pld	W	D	L	GF	GA	GD	Pts	Qualification
1	Italy	3	3	0	0	40	18	+22	6	Advanced to quarterfinals
2	United States	3	2	0	1	39	14	+25	4	Advanced to playoffs
3	Brazil	3	1	0	2	19	36	−17	2	Advanced to playoffs
4	Japan	3	0	0	3	13	43	−30	0	

Source: SportResult.com
Rules for classification: 1) points; 2) head-to-head points; 3) head-to-head goal difference; 4) head-to-head number of goals scored; 5) goal difference.

26 July 2015; 20:10	Report	Japan	3–15	Italy	Kazan; Attendance: 2,286; Referees: Francesc Buch (ESP), Mark Koganov (AZE)
26 July 2015; 20:10	Report	Score by quarters: 0–5, 1–3, 2–2, 0–5			Kazan; Attendance: 2,286; Referees: Francesc Buch (ESP), Mark Koganov (AZE)
26 July 2015; 20:10	Report	three players 1	Goals	Garibotti, Tabani 3	Kazan; Attendance: 2,286; Referees: Francesc Buch (ESP), Mark Koganov (AZE)

28 July 2015; 13:30	Report	Brazil	11–8	Japan	Kazan; Attendance: 543; Referees: Stephane Roy (CAN), Viktor Salnichenko (KAZ)
28 July 2015; 13:30	Report	Score by quarters: 4–2, 2–1, 4–3, 1–2			Kazan; Attendance: 543; Referees: Stephane Roy (CAN), Viktor Salnichenko (KAZ)
28 July 2015; 13:30	Report	Chiappini 5	Goals	Nakano 3	Kazan; Attendance: 543; Referees: Stephane Roy (CAN), Viktor Salnichenko (KAZ)

30 July 2015; 10:50	Report	Japan	2–17	United States	Kazan; Attendance: 729; Referees: Dion Willis (RSA), Vojin Putniković (SRB)
30 July 2015; 10:50	Report	Score by quarters: 0–4, 0–4, 1–6, 1–3			Kazan; Attendance: 729; Referees: Dion Willis (RSA), Vojin Putniković (SRB)
30 July 2015; 10:50	Report	Nakano 2	Goals	Steffens 4	Kazan; Attendance: 729; Referees: Dion Willis (RSA), Vojin Putniković (SRB)

13th–16th place semifinals

1 August 2015; 12:10	Report	Japan	6–9	France	Kazan; Attendance: 1,969; Referees: Fabio Toffoli (BRA), Peter de Jong (NED)
1 August 2015; 12:10	Report	Score by quarters: 3–2, 1–4, 1–1, 1–2			Kazan; Attendance: 1,969; Referees: Fabio Toffoli (BRA), Peter de Jong (NED)
1 August 2015; 12:10	Report	Nakano 2	Goals	Guillet 5	Kazan; Attendance: 1,969; Referees: Fabio Toffoli (BRA), Peter de Jong (NED)

15th place game

3 August 2015; 09:30	Report	South Africa	7–15	Japan	Kazan; Attendance: 329; Referees: Peter de Jong (NED), German Moller (ARG)
3 August 2015; 09:30	Report	Score by quarters: 0–2, 0–2, 3–8, 4–3			Kazan; Attendance: 329; Referees: Peter de Jong (NED), German Moller (ARG)
3 August 2015; 09:30	Report	White 2	Goals	Nakano 4	Kazan; Attendance: 329; Referees: Peter de Jong (NED), German Moller (ARG)
