= Synchronized swimming at the 2017 World Aquatics Championships =

Results of the synchronized swimming competition (solo, duet, and group)

Synchronized swimming at the 2017 World Aquatics Championships was held between 14 and 22 July 2017 in Budapest, Hungary.

== Schedule ==
Nine events were held.

All time are local (UTC+2).

Date	Time	Round
14 July 2017	11:00	Solo technical routine preliminaries
14 July 2017	16:00	Duet technical routine preliminaries
15 July 2017	11:00	Solo technical routine final
15 July 2017	19:00	Mixed duet technical routine preliminaries
16 July 2017	11:00	Duet technical routine final
16 July 2017	19:00	Team technical routine preliminaries
17 July 2017	11:00	Mixed duet technical routine final
17 July 2017	19:00	Solo free routine preliminaries
18 July 2017	11:00	Team technical routine final
18 July 2017	19:00	Duet free routine preliminaries
19 July 2017	11:00	Solo free routine final
19 July 2017	19:00	Team free routine preliminaries
20 July 2017	11:00	Duet free routine final
20 July 2017	19:00	Free combination preliminaries
21 July 2017	11:00	Team free routine final
21 July 2017	19:00	Mixed duet free routine preliminaries
22 July 2017	11:00	Free combination final
22 July 2017	19:00	Mixed duet free routine final

== Medal summary ==
=== Medal table ===
Rank	Nation	Gold	Silver	Bronze	Total
1	Russia (RUS)	7	1	0	8
2	China (CHN)	1	4	0	5
3	Italy (ITA)	1	1	0	2
4	Spain (ESP)	0	2	0	2
5	Ukraine (UKR)	0	1	5	6
6	Japan (JPN)	0	0	2	2
6	United States (USA)	0	0	2	2
Totals (7 entries)		9	9	9	27

=== Events ===
Event	Gold		Silver		Bronze	
Solo Technical Routine	Svetlana Kolesnichenko; Russia	95.2036	Ona Carbonell; Spain	93.6534	Anna Voloshyna; Ukraine	91.9992
Solo Free Routine	Svetlana Kolesnichenko; Russia	96.1333	Ona Carbonell; Spain	95.0333	Anna Voloshyna; Ukraine	93.3000
Duet Technical Routine	Russia; Svetlana Kolesnichenko; Alexandra Patskevich	95.0515	China; Jiang Tingting; Jiang Wenwen	94.0775	Ukraine; Anna Voloshyna; Yelyzaveta Yakhno	92.6482
Duet Free Routine	Russia; Svetlana Kolesnichenko; Alexandra Patskevich	97.0000	China; Jiang Tingting; Jiang Wenwen	95.3000	Ukraine; Anna Voloshyna; Yelyzaveta Yakhno	93.2667
Team Technical Routine	Russia; Anastasia Bayandina; Daria Bayandina; Vlada Chigireva; Maryna Goliadkina; Veronika Kalinina; Polina Komar; Maria Shurochkina; Darina Valitova	96.0109	China; Feng Yu; Guo Li; Liang Xinping; Tang Mengni; Wang Liuyi; Wang Qianyi; Xiao Yanning; Yin Chengxin	94.2165	Japan; Sakiko Akutsu; Juka Fukumura; Yukiko Inui; Minami Kono; Kei Marumo; Kanami Nakamaki; Mai Nakamura; Kano Omata	93.1590
Team Free Routine	Russia; Anastasia Bayandina; Daria Bayandina; Vlada Chigireva; Maryna Goliadkina; Veronika Kalinina; Polina Komar; Maria Shurochkina; Darina Valitova	97.3000	China; Feng Yu; Guo Li; Liang Xinping; Tang Mengni; Chang Hao; Yu Lele; Xiao Yanning; Yin Chengxin	95.2333	Ukraine; Vladyslava Aleksiiva; Valeriia Aprielieva; Anna Voloshyna; Oleksandra Kashuba; Yelyzaveta Yakhno; Anastasiya Savchuk; Kseniya Sydorenko; Maryna Aleksiiva	93.9333
Free Routine Combination	China; Chang Hao; Feng Yu; Guo Li; Liang Xinping; Tang Mengni; Wang Liuyi; Wang Qianyi; Xiao Yanning; Yin Chengxin; Yu Lele	96.1000	Ukraine; Maryna Aleksiiva; Vladyslava Aleksiiva; Valeriia Aprielieva; Oleksandra Kashuba; Yana Nariezhna; Anastasiya Savchuk; Alina Shynkarenko; Kseniya Sydorenko; Anna Voloshyna; Yelyzaveta Yakhno	94.0000	Japan; Sakiko Akutsu; Juka Fukumura; Yukiko Inui; Minami Kono; Kei Marumo; Kanami Nakamaki; Mai Nakamura; Kano Omata; Yuriko Osawa; Asuka Tasaki	93.2000
Mixed Duet Free Routine	Russia; Mikhaela Kalancha; Aleksandr Maltsev	92.6000	Italy; Mariangela Perrupato; Giorgio Minisini	91.1000	United States; Kanako Spendlove; Bill May	88.7667
Mixed Duet Technical Routine	Italy; Manila Flamini; Giorgio Minisini	90.2979	Russia; Mikhaela Kalancha; Aleksandr Maltsev	90.2639	United States; Kanako Spendlove; Bill May	87.6682
