= Synchronized swimming at the 2017 World Aquatics Championships – Free routine combination =

Free routine combination at the 2017 World Aquatics Championships
- Venue: City Park
- Location: Budapest, Hungary
- Dates: 20 July (preliminaries); 22 July (final)
- Competitors: 160 from 16 nations
- Teams: 16
- Winning points: 96.1000

Medalists
gold medal	Chang Hao; Feng Yu; Guo Li; Liang Xinping; Tang Mengni; Wang Liuyi; Wang Qianyi; Xiao Yanning; Yin Chengxin; Yu Lele	China
silver medal	Maryna Aleksiiva; Vladyslava Aleksiiva; Valeriia Aprielieva; Oleksandra Kashuba; Yana Nariezhna; Anastasiya Savchuk; Alina Shynkarenko; Kseniya Sydorenko; Anna Voloshyna; Yelyzaveta Yakhno	Ukraine
bronze medal	Sakiko Akutsu; Juka Fukumura; Yukiko Inui; Minami Kono; Kei Marumo; Kanami Nakamaki; Mai Nakamura; Kano Omata; Yuriko Osawa; Asuka Tasaki	Japan

The Free routine combination competition at the 2017 World Championships was held on 20 and 22 July 2017.

== Results ==
The preliminary round was started on 20 July at 19:00. The final was held on 22 July at 11:00.

Green denotes finalists

Rank	Nation	Preliminary		Final	
Rank	Nation	Points	Rank	Points	Rank
1st place, gold medalist(s)	China	95.5333	1	96.1000	1
2nd place, silver medalist(s)	Ukraine	93.1667	2	94.0000	2
3rd place, bronze medalist(s)	Japan	92.9667	3	93.2000	3
4	Italy	90.7333	4	91.6667	4
5	Spain	90.2000	5	90.6667	5
6	Mexico	87.5333	6	88.7333	6
7	Greece	86.0000	7	87.0000	7
8	France	85.3000	8	85.0667	8
9	North Korea	84.3333	9	84.2000	9
10	Belarus	82.3667	10	83.4000	10
11	Switzerland	81.7333	11	82.0333	11
12	Kazakhstan	81.0333	12	82.0000	12
13	Germany	79.1000	13	did not advance	
14	Uzbekistan	76.8333	14	did not advance	
15	Slovakia	75.4667	15	did not advance	
16	Macau	71.0000	16	did not advance	
