= 2015 FINA Swimming World Cup =

The 2015 FINA Swimming World Cup was a series of eight, two-day, long course swimming meets in eight cities between August and November 2015. Airweave was the title sponsor for the series, with Omega serving as official timer. This was the first World Cup edition held in a long-course pool, allowing swimmers to prepare for the following year's Olympics, which were also held in long course.

== Meets ==
The 2015 World Cup consisted of the following eight meets:

Meet	Dates	Location	Venue
1	11–12 August	Moscow, Russia	Olimpiysky Sports Complex
2	15–16 August	Chartres-Paris, France	L'Odyssée
3	25–26 September	Hong Kong	Victoria Park Swimming Pool
4	29–30 September	Beijing, China	Ying Tung Natatorium
5	3–4 October	Singapore (Note: The finals session of the first day of the city's meet was cancelled due to haze conditions. Events on the second day proceeded normally.)	OCBC Aquatic Centre
6	28–29 October	Tokyo, Japan	Tokyo Tatsumi International Swimming Center
7	2–3 November	Doha, Qatar	Hamad Aquatic Centre
8	6–7 November	Dubai, United Arab Emirates	Dubai Sports Complex

== World Cup standings ==
- Composition of points:
  - Best performances (by meets): 1st place: 24 points, 2nd place: 18 points and 3rd place: 12 points;
  - Points for medals (in individual events): gold medal: 12 points, silver medal: 9 points and bronze medal: 6 points;
  - Bonus for world record (WR): 20 points.

=== Men ===
Overall top 10:

Rank	Name	Nationality	Points awarded (Bonus)								Total
Rank	Name	Nationality	RUS	FRA	HKG	CHN	SIN	JPN	QAT	UAE	Total
1	Cameron van der Burgh	South Africa	48	48	48	57	36	42	48	42	369
2	Chad le Clos	South Africa	21	60	–	–	–	–	48	51	180
3	Mitch Larkin	Australia	–	–	–	–	–	57	60	57	174
4	Dávid Verrasztó	Hungary	12	18	24	33	6	12	18	12	135
5	Masato Sakai	Japan	–	–	48	36	21	12	–	–	117
6	Ashley Delaney	Australia	12	15	27	30	21	–	–	–	105
7	David Plummer	United States	–	–	–	–	–	18	33	33	84
7	Katsumi Nakamura	Japan	–	–	24	24	12	24	–	–	84
9	Daniel Smith	Australia	–	12	30	24	12	–	–	–	78
10	Yuki Shirai	Japan	–	–	30	27	18	–	–	–	75

=== Women ===
Overall top 10:

Rank	Name	Nationality	Points awarded (Bonus)								Total
Rank	Name	Nationality	RUS	FRA	HKG	CHN	SIN	JPN	QAT	UAE	Total
1	Katinka Hosszú	Hungary	81	81	129	66	45	81	87	99	669
2	Emily Seebohm	Australia	57	54	57	57	36	60	60	60	441
3	Zsuzsanna Jakabos	Hungary	9	24	42	36	30	18	21	21	201
4	Alia Atkinson	Jamaica	–	24	36	24	18	9	21	42	174
5	Cate Campbell	Australia	–	–	36	42	30	–	–	–	108
6	Natalie Coughlin	United States	–	39	–	–	–	9	33	–	81
6	Vitalina Simonova	Russia	30	12	21	9	9	–	–	–	81
8	Missy Franklin	United States	–	30	24	18	6	–	–	–	78
8	Jeanette Ottesen	Denmark	24	–	18	24	12	–	–	–	78
10	Lauren Boyle	New Zealand	–	21	–	–	–	–	24	24	69

== Event winners ==
=== 50 m freestyle ===
Meet	Men			Women		
Meet	Winner	Nationality	Time	Winner	Nationality	Time
Moscow	Josh Schneider	United States	21.80	Jeanette Ottesen	Denmark	24.62
Chartres-Paris	Josh Schneider	United States	22.11	Anna Santamans	France	24.78
Hong Kong	Katsumi Nakamura	Japan	22.15	Cate Campbell	Australia	24.69
Beijing	Katsumi Nakamura	Japan	22.27	Cate Campbell	Australia	24.30
Singapore	Katsumi Nakamura	Japan	22.47	Cancelled		
Tokyo	Katsumi Nakamura	Japan	22.15	Melanie Wright	Australia	24.92
Doha	Bruno Fratus	Brazil	22.28	Anna Santamans	France	24.95
Dubai	Bruno Fratus	Brazil	22.05	Melanie Wright	Australia	24.72

=== 100 m freestyle ===
Meet	Men			Women		
Meet	Winner	Nationality	Time	Winner	Nationality	Time
Moscow	Chad le Clos	South Africa	48.16	Katinka Hosszú	Hungary	54.10
Chartres-Paris	Mehdy Metella	France	48.69	Katinka Hosszú	Hungary	54.30
Hong Kong	Katsumi Nakamura	Japan	49.48	Cate Campbell	Australia	53.60
Beijing	Katsumi Nakamura	Japan	48.60	Cate Campbell	Australia	52.96
Singapore	Cancelled			Cate Campbell	Australia	53.09
Tokyo	Katsumi Nakamura	Japan	49.17	Rikako Ikee	Japan	54.14
Doha	Chad le Clos	South Africa	48.96	Melanie Wright	Australia	53.86
Dubai	Jérémy Stravius	France	48.34	Melanie Wright	Australia	53.79

=== 200 m freestyle ===
Meet	Men			Women		
Meet	Winner	Nationality	Time	Winner	Nationality	Time
Moscow	Danila Izotov	Russia	1:46.93	Katinka Hosszú	Hungary	1:56.83
Chartres-Paris	Daniel Smith	Australia	1:46.50	Katinka Hosszú	Hungary	1:56.06
Hong Kong	Daniel Smith	Australia	1:48.81	Katinka Hosszú	Hungary	1:55.81
Beijing	Daniel Smith	Australia	1:46.70	Shen Duo	China	1:56.47
Singapore	Daniel Smith	Australia	1:48.15	Cancelled		
Tokyo	Yuuki Kobori	Japan	1:47.59	Katinka Hosszú	Hungary	1:56.67
Doha	James Guy	United Kingdom	1:47.06	Katinka Hosszú	Hungary	1:56.60
Dubai	James Guy	United Kingdom	1:46.60	Katinka Hosszú	Hungary	1:55.41

=== 400 m freestyle ===
Meet	Men			Women		
Meet	Winner	Nationality	Time	Winner	Nationality	Time
Moscow	Myles Brown	South Africa	3:48.52	Shao Yiwen	China	4:07.30
Chartres-Paris	Jan Micka	Czech Republic	3:50.64	Lindsay Vrooman	United States	4:07.16
Hong Kong	Daniel Smith	Australia	3:52.68	Katinka Hosszú	Hungary	4:13.93
Beijing	Daniel Smith	Australia	3:51.45	Guo Junjun	China	4:08.46
Singapore	Cancelled			Katinka Hosszú	Hungary	4:12.00
Tokyo	Yousuke Miyamoto	Japan	3:49.68	Katinka Hosszú	Hungary	4:08.87
Doha	James Guy	United Kingdom	3:46.76	Lauren Boyle	New Zealand	4:06.58
Dubai	James Guy	United Kingdom	3:46.91	Lauren Boyle	New Zealand	4:04.26

=== 1500 m (men)/800 m (women) freestyle ===
Meet	Men (1500 m)			Women (800 m)		
Meet	Winner	Nationality	Time	Winner	Nationality	Time
Moscow	Gregorio Paltrinieri	Italy	14:55.06	Zhang Yuhan	China	8:30.60
Chartres-Paris	Gregorio Paltrinieri	Italy	15:04.98	Lauren Boyle	New Zealand	8:26.46
Hong Kong	Masato Sakai	Japan	15:28.04	Katinka Hosszú	Hungary	8:42.88
Beijing	Masato Sakai	Japan	15:29.46	Wang Guoyue	China	8:37.38
Singapore	Not Scheduled			Not Scheduled		
Tokyo	Ayatsugu Hirai	Japan	15:16.39	Yukimi Moriyama	Japan	8:40.98
Doha	Mykhailo Romanchuk	Ukraine	15:07.06	Lauren Boyle	New Zealand	8:24.76
Dubai	Jan Micka	Czech Republic	15:02.08	Lauren Boyle	New Zealand	8:25.96

=== 50 m backstroke ===
Meet	Men			Women		
Meet	Winner	Nationality	Time	Winner	Nationality	Time
Moscow	Camille Lacourt	France	24.67	Emily Seebohm	Australia	27.90
Chartres-Paris	Camille Lacourt	France	24.75	Natalie Coughlin	United States	27.65
Hong Kong	Ashley Delaney	Australia	25.55	Emily Seebohm	Australia	27.90
Beijing	Xu Jiayu	China	24.65	Fu Yuanhui	China	27.55
Singapore	Ashley Delaney	Australia	25.30	Cancelled		
Tokyo	David Plummer	United States	24.58	Emily Seebohm	Australia	27.49
Doha	David Plummer; Mitch Larkin	United States; Australia	24.70	Emily Seebohm	Australia	27.85
Dubai	David Plummer	United States	24.64	Emily Seebohm	Australia	27.57

=== 100 m backstroke ===
Meet	Men			Women		
Meet	Winner	Nationality	Time	Winner	Nationality	Time
Moscow	Camille Lacourt	France	53.44	Emily Seebohm	Australia	58.88
Chartres-Paris	Camille Lacourt	France	53.39	Emily Seebohm	Australia	58.91
Hong Kong	Yuki Shirai	Japan	54.39	Emily Seebohm	Australia	58.88
Beijing	Ashley Delaney	Australia	54.36	Emily Seebohm	Australia	58.59
Singapore	Cancelled			Emily Seebohm	Australia	58.72
Tokyo	Mitch Larkin	Australia	52.48	Emily Seebohm	Australia	58.37
Doha	Mitch Larkin	Australia	52.26	Emily Seebohm	Australia	58.34
Dubai	Mitch Larkin	Australia	52.11	Emily Seebohm	Australia	58.51

=== 200 m backstroke ===
Meet	Men			Women		
Meet	Winner	Nationality	Time	Winner	Nationality	Time
Moscow	Ashley Delaney	Australia	1:58.41	Daria Ustinova	Russia	2:08.21
Chartres-Paris	Chad le Clos	South Africa	1:57.80	Daria Ustinova	Russia	2:07.43
Hong Kong	Yuki Shirai	Japan	1:58.68	Katinka Hosszú	Hungary	2:08.61
Beijing	Yuki Shirai	Japan	1:57.98	Emily Seebohm	Australia	2:09.22
Singapore	Yuki Shirai	Japan	1:57.96	Cancelled		
Tokyo	Mitch Larkin	Australia	1:53.34	Emily Seebohm	Australia	2:08.08
Doha	Mitch Larkin	Australia	1:53.80	Emily Seebohm	Australia	2:07.19
Dubai	Mitch Larkin	Australia	1:53.17	Emily Seebohm	Australia	2:06.94

=== 50 m breaststroke ===
Meet	Men			Women		
Meet	Winner	Nationality	Time	Winner	Nationality	Time
Moscow	Cameron van der Burgh	South Africa	26.96	Katie Meili	United States	30.76
Chartres-Paris	Cameron van der Burgh	South Africa	26.74	Alia Atkinson	Jamaica	30.85
Hong Kong	Cameron van der Burgh	South Africa	27.23	Alia Atkinson	Jamaica	30.90
Beijing	Cameron van der Burgh	South Africa	27.03	Alia Atkinson	Jamaica	30.65
Singapore	Cancelled			Alia Atkinson	Jamaica	30.74
Tokyo	Cameron van der Burgh	South Africa	27.18	Molly Hannis	United States	30.63
Doha	Cameron van der Burgh	South Africa	26.96	Alia Atkinson	Jamaica	30.55
Dubai	Cameron van der Burgh	South Africa	26.77	Alia Atkinson	Jamaica	30.26

=== 100 m breaststroke ===
Meet	Men			Women		
Meet	Winner	Nationality	Time	Winner	Nationality	Time
Moscow	Cameron van der Burgh	South Africa	59.27	Katie Meili	United States	1:06.68
Chartres-Paris	Cameron van der Burgh	South Africa	58.97	Alia Atkinson	Jamaica	1:07.03
Hong Kong	Cameron van der Burgh	South Africa	1:00.23	Alia Atkinson	Jamaica	1:07.91
Beijing	Cameron van der Burgh	South Africa	59.76	Alia Atkinson	Jamaica	1:07.39
Singapore	Cameron van der Burgh	South Africa	59.38	Cancelled		
Tokyo	Cameron van der Burgh	South Africa	59.97	Molly Hannis	United States	1:07.71
Doha	Cameron van der Burgh	South Africa	59.68	Molly Hannis	United States	1:06.94
Dubai	Cameron van der Burgh	South Africa	59.05	Alia Atkinson	Jamaica	1:05.93

=== 200 m breaststroke ===
Meet	Men			Women		
Meet	Winner	Nationality	Time	Winner	Nationality	Time
Moscow	Marco Koch	Germany	2:08.77	Vitalina Simonova	Russia	2:22.94
Chartres-Paris	Nic Fink	United States	2:08.89	Vitalina Simonova	Russia	2:25.26
Hong Kong	Akihiro Yamaguchi	Japan	2:13.13	Vitalina Simonova	Russia	2:28.36
Beijing	Mao Feilian	China	2:10.95	Zhang Xinyu	China	2:27.17
Singapore	Cancelled			Micah Lawrence	United States	2:25.89
Tokyo	Yukihiro Takahashi	Japan	2:09.50	Rie Kaneto	Japan	2:23.01
Doha	Dániel Gyurta	Hungary	2:10.33	Rie Kaneto	Japan	2:23.45
Dubai	Dániel Gyurta	Hungary	2:10.43	Viktoriya Zeynep Gunes	Turkey	2:22.87

=== 50 m butterfly ===
Meet	Men			Women		
Meet	Winner	Nationality	Time	Winner	Nationality	Time
Moscow	Andriy Govorov	Ukraine	23.30	Jeanette Ottesen	Denmark	25.51
Chartres-Paris	Chad le Clos	South Africa	23.23	Béryl Gastaldello	France	26.35
Hong Kong	Geoffrey Cheah	Hong Kong	24.23	Jeanette Ottesen	Denmark	25.82
Beijing	Li Zhuhao	China	23.39	Jeanette Ottesen	Denmark	25.81
Singapore	Cancelled			Jeanette Ottesen	Denmark	25.84
Tokyo	Giles Smith	United States	23.68	Rikako Ikee	Japan	26.17
Doha	Chad le Clos	South Africa	23.43	Alexandra Touretski	Switzerland	26.81
Dubai	Chad le Clos	South Africa	23.31	Felicia Lee	United States	26.69

=== 100 m butterfly ===
Meet	Men			Women		
Meet	Winner	Nationality	Time	Winner	Nationality	Time
Moscow	Tom Shields	United States	51.36	Madeline Groves; Claire Donahue	Australia; United States	58.08
Chartres-Paris	Chad le Clos	South Africa	51.04	Madeline Groves	Australia	57.98
Hong Kong	Viacheslav Prudnikov; Nicholas Brown	Russia; Australia	53.64	Katinka Hosszú	Hungary	59.31
Beijing	Masato Sakai	Japan	53.52	Jeanette Ottesen	Denmark	57.97
Singapore	Masato Sakai	Japan	53.53	Cancelled		
Tokyo	Chris Wright	Australia	52.77	Rikako Ikee	Japan	57.56
Doha	Chad le Clos	South Africa	51.44	Felicia Lee	United States	58.83
Dubai	Chad le Clos	South Africa	51.09	Felicia Lee	United States	58.57

=== 200 m butterfly ===
Meet	Men			Women		
Meet	Winner	Nationality	Time	Winner	Nationality	Time
Moscow	Viktor Bromer	Denmark	1:55.03	Cammile Adams	United States	2:06.33
Chartres-Paris	Chad le Clos	South Africa	1:54.18	Franziska Hentke	Germany	2:06.58
Hong Kong	Masato Sakai	Japan	1:56.25	Katinka Hosszú	Hungary	2:09.09
Beijing	Masato Sakai	Japan	1:57.44	Zsuzsanna Jakabos	Hungary	2:09.90
Singapore	Cancelled			Zsuzsanna Jakabos	Hungary	2:08.65
Tokyo	Masato Sakai	Japan	1:55.75	Natsumi Hoshi	Japan	2:08.13
Doha	Chad le Clos	South Africa	1:55.80	Zsuzsanna Jakabos	Hungary	2:08.47
Dubai	Viktor Bromer	Denmark	1:55.98	Zsuzsanna Jakabos	Hungary	2:07.77

=== 200 m individual medley ===
Meet	Men			Women		
Meet	Winner	Nationality	Time	Winner	Nationality	Time
Moscow	Philip Heintz	Germany	1:58.46	Katinka Hosszú	Hungary	2:10.68
Chartres-Paris	Hiromasa Fujimori	Japan	1:59.39	Katinka Hosszú	Hungary	2:10.19
Hong Kong	Tomas Elliot	Australia	2:01.82	Katinka Hosszú	Hungary	2:11.78
Beijing	Dávid Verrasztó	Hungary	2:01.72	Katinka Hosszú	Hungary	2:10.44
Singapore	Semen Makovich	Russia	2:01.76	Cancelled		
Tokyo	Hiromasa Fujimori	Japan	1:59.76	Katinka Hosszú	Hungary	2:09.85
Doha	Keita Sunama	Japan	2:00.48	Katinka Hosszú	Hungary	2:10.22
Dubai	Keita Sunama	Japan	2:00.72	Katinka Hosszú	Hungary	2:08.61

=== 400 m individual medley ===
Meet	Men			Women		
Meet	Winner	Nationality	Time	Winner	Nationality	Time
Moscow	Dávid Verrasztó	Hungary	4:14.89	Katinka Hosszú	Hungary	4:36.25
Chartres-Paris	Dávid Verrasztó	Hungary	4:27.05	Katinka Hosszú	Hungary	4:35.80
Hong Kong	Dávid Verrasztó	Hungary	4:18.06	Katinka Hosszú	Hungary	4:42.27
Beijing	Dávid Verrasztó	Hungary	4:16.36	Katinka Hosszú	Hungary	4:39.49
Singapore	Cancelled			Katinka Hosszú	Hungary	4:37.30
Tokyo	Dávid Verrasztó	Hungary	4:15.60	Katinka Hosszú	Hungary	4:37.26
Doha	Dávid Verrasztó	Hungary	4:16.17	Katinka Hosszú	Hungary	4:36.39
Dubai	Dávid Verrasztó	Hungary	4:16.71	Katinka Hosszú	Hungary	4:33.88

Legend: WR – World record; WC – World Cup record
