= Synchronized swimming at the 2017 World Aquatics Championships – Team technical routine =

Team technical routine at the 2017 World Aquatics Championships
- Venue: City Park
- Location: Budapest, Hungary
- Dates: 16 July (preliminaries); 18 July (final)
- Competitors: 192 from 24 nations
- Teams: 24
- Winning points: 96.0109

Medalists
gold medal	Anastasia Bayandina; Daria Bayandina; Vlada Chigireva; Maryna Goliadkina; Veronika Kalinina; Polina Komar; Maria Shurochkina; Darina Valitova	Russia
silver medal	Feng Yu; Guo Li; Liang Xinping; Tang Mengni; Wang Liuyi; Wang Qianyi; Xiao Yanning; Yin Chengxin	China
bronze medal	Sakiko Akutsu; Juka Fukumura; Yukiko Inui; Minami Kono; Kei Marumo; Kanami Nakamaki; Mai Nakamura; Kano Omata	Japan

The Team technical routine competition at the 2017 World Championships was held on 16 and 18 July 2017.

== Results ==
The preliminary round was started on 16 July at 19:00. The final was held on 18 July at 11:00.

Green denotes finalists

Rank	Nation	Preliminary		Final	
Rank	Nation	Points	Rank	Points	Rank
1st place, gold medalist(s)	Russia	95.0121	1	96.0109	1
2nd place, silver medalist(s)	China	93.0711	2	94.2165	2
3rd place, bronze medalist(s)	Japan	91.7484	3	93.1590	3
4	Ukraine	91.4917	4	92.3596	4
5	Italy	89.5587	5	90.7617	5
6	Spain	88.8044	6	88.4687	6
7	Canada	86.4407	7	86.2044	7
8	Mexico	85.4788	8	85.9664	8
9	Greece	83.8569	9	83.9112	9
10	North Korea	83.6271	10	83.4354	10
11	United States	82.1080	11	82.8546	11
12	Belarus	81.6227	12	82.2796	12
13	Switzerland	81.0684	13	did not advance	
14	Germany	76.9929	14	did not advance	
15	Hungary	76.9077	15	did not advance	
16	Uzbekistan	74.8230	16	did not advance	
17	Slovakia	74.5487	17	did not advance	
18	Egypt	73.7861	18	did not advance	
19	Singapore	73.6012	19	did not advance	
20	Australia	72.6056	20	did not advance	
21	Israel	72.3289	21	did not advance	
22	Croatia	70.7239	22	did not advance	
23	Macau	67.0935	23	did not advance	
24	Costa Rica	65.2021	24	did not advance	
