= 2016 Asian Swimming Championships =

10th Asian Swimming Championships
- Host city: Tokyo, Japan
- Date: November 14 – 20, 2016
- Venue: 1

The 10th Asian Swimming Championships were held 14–20 November 2016 in Tokyo, Japan.

The Championships is organized by the Asia Aquatics and in 2016 featured competition in 4 of the 5 Aquatics disciplines in 56 events:

- Swimming: 17–20 November (long course) (38);
- Synchronized Swimming: 17–20 November (8);
- Water Polo: 14–20 November (2); and
- Diving: 17–20 November (8).

== Venues ==
Swimming; Synchronised swimming Diving	Tokyo Tatsumi International Swimming Center
Water Polo	Tokyo Metropolitan Gymnasium

== Medalists ==
=== Swimming ===
==== Men's events ====
Event	Gold		Silver		Bronze	
50m freestyle	Katsumi Nakamura (JPN); Yu Hexin (CHN)	22.03 CR	Not awarded, as there was a tie for gold.		Shunichi Nakao (JPN)	22.41
100m freestyle	Park Tae-hwan (KOR)	48.57 CR	Katsumi Nakamura (JPN)	48.77	Yu Hexin (CHN)	48.81
200m freestyle	Park Tae-hwan (KOR)	1:45.16 CR	Wang Shun (CHN)	1:47.07	Katsuhiro Matsumoto (JPN)	1:47.87
400m freestyle	Park Tae-hwan (KOR)	3:44.68	Tsubasa Amai (JPN)	3:51.09	Qiu Ziao (CHN)	3:51.74
1500 freestyle	Park Tae-hwan (KOR)	15:07.86	Qiu Ziao (CHN)	15:14.14	Shogo Takeda (JPN)	3:51.09
50m backstroke	Xu Jiayu (CHN)	24.65 CR	Shunichi Nakao (JPN)	25.17	I Gede Siman Sudartawa (INA)	25.26
100m backstroke	Xu Jiayu (CHN)	53.02	Li Guangyuan (CHN)	54.30	Takeshi Kawamoto (JPN)	54.39
200m backstroke	Xu Jiayu (CHN)	1:55.19 CR	Li Guangyuan (CHN)	1:57.47	Keita Sunama (JPN)	1:57.96
50m breaststroke	Yasuhiro Koseki (JPN)	27.62 CR	Koichiro Okazaki (JPN)	27.70	Li Xiang (CHN)	27.84
100m breaststroke	Ippei Watanabe (JPN)	59:99 CR	Yasuhiro Koseki (JPN)	1:00.02	Yan Zibei (CHN)	1:00.14
200m breaststroke	Ippei Watanabe (JPN)	2:08.19 CR	Mao Feilian (CHN)	2:11.95	Li Xiang (CHN)	2:12.04
50m butterfly	Masayuki Kishida (JPN)	23.66 CR	Li Zhuhao (CHN)	23.74	Takeshi Kawamoto (JPN)	23.97
100m butterfly	Li Zhuhao (CHN)	52.00 CR	Masato Sakai (JPN); Takeshi Kawamoto (JPN)	52.77	Not awarded, as there was a tie for silver.	
200m butterfly	Masato Sakai (JPN)	1:54.53 CR	Daiya Seto (JPN)	1:55.45	Yu Yingbiao (CHN)	1:56.53
200m I.M.	Wang Shun (CHN)	1:56.66 CR	Daiya Seto (JPN)	1:57.80	Keita Sunama (JPN)	1:58.82
400m I.M.	Daiya Seto (JPN)	4:10.17 CR	Wang Shun (CHN)	4:15.10	Mao Feilian (CHN)	4:15.73
4×100m freestyle	China (CHN); Lin Yongqing (49.23); He Jianbin (49.38); Liu Zhaochen (49.15); Yu Hexin (48.61)	3:16.37 CR	Japan (JPN); Katsumi Nakamura (48.96); Junya Koga (49.53); Katsuhiro Matsumoto (48.88); Tsubasa Amai (49.88)	3:17.25	South Korea (KOR); J.Yang (50.09); H.Lee (50.72); J.Kim (49.88); Park Tae-hwan (48.11)	3:18.80
4×200m freestyle	Japan (JPN); Katsuhiro Matsumoto (1:47.67); Tsubasa Amai (1:48.52); Daiya Seto (1:47.65); Fuyu Yoshida (1:49.30)	7:13.14 CR	China (CHN); Wang Shun (1:47.40); Shang Keyuan (1:48.36); Qiu Ziao (1:50.05); Qian Zhiyong (1:48.86)	7:14.67	Chinese Taipei (TPE); Chou W. (1:52.80); Huang G. (1:52.89); Tsai Y. (1:52.72); An Ting-yao (1:50.49)	7:28.90
4×100m medley	China (CHN); Xu Jiayu (52.75); Li Xiang (59.93); Li Zhuhao (52.09); Yu Hexin (48.66)	3:33.43 CR	Japan (JPN); Masaki Kaneko (54.21); Yasuhiro Koseki (59.62); Takeshi Kawamoto (52.79); Katsumi Nakamura (48.86)	3:35.48	Chinese Taipei (TPE); Chou W. (58.42); Lee H. (1:02.07); Tsai Y. (55.14); An Ting-yao (50.35)	3:45.98

==== Women's events ====
Event	Gold		Silver		Bronze	
50m freestyle	Rikako Ikee (JPN)	24.90 CR	Zhu Menghui (CHN)	24.91	Liu Xiang (CHN)	25.01
100m freestyle	Zhu Menghui (CHN)	53.44 CR	Rikako Ikee (JPN)	53.68 NR	Shen Duo (CHN)	54.03
200m freestyle	Shen Duo (CHN)	1:56.71 CR	Ai Yanhan (CHN)	1:57.35	Nguyễn Thị Ánh Viên (VIE)	1:59.31
400m freestyle	Li Bingjie (CHN)	4:07.16	Chihiro Igarashi (JPN)	4:08.69	Zhang Yuhan (CHN)	4:08.80
800m freestyle	Hou Yawen (CHN)	8:26.49	Dong Jie (CHN)	8:35.21	Nguyễn Thị Ánh Viên (VIE)	8:38.21
50m backstroke	Fu Yuanhui (CHN)	27.86	Wang Xueer (CHN)	28.01	Emi Moronuki (JPN)	28.39
100m backstroke	Fu Yuanhui (CHN)	59.70 CR	Wang Xueer (CHN)	1:00.03	Emi Moronuki (JPN)	1:01.09
200m backstroke	Chen Jie (CHN)	2:08.98 CR	Liu Yaxin (CHN)	2:09.01	Rio Shirai (JPN)	2:10.53
50m breaststroke	Satomi Suzuki (JPN)	31.28 CR	Misaki Sekiguchi (JPN)	31.39	Shi Jinglin (CHN)	32.04
100m breaststroke	Misaki Sekiguchi (JPN)	1:07.86	Reona Aoki (JPN)	1:07.99	Shi Jinglin (CHN)	1:08.00
200m breaststroke	Reona Aoki (JPN)	2:22.74 CR	Shi Jinglin (CHN)	2:24.19	Misaki Sekiguchi (JPN)	2:27.41
50m butterfly	Rikako Ikee (JPN)	25.74 CR	Lu Ying (CHN)	26.19	Zhou Yilin (CHN)	26.53
100m butterfly	Rikako Ikee (JPN)	57.46	Chan Kin Lok (HKG)	59.82	Yui Yamane (JPN)	1:00.02
200m butterfly	Zhou Yilin (CHN)	2:07.40	Zhang Yufei (CHN)	2:08.50	Miyu Nakano (JPN)	2:10.90
200m I.M.	Yui Ohashi (JPN)	2:11.46 CR	Runa Imai (JPN)	2:12.58	Nguyễn Thị Ánh Viên (VIE)	2:12.95
400m I.M.	Nguyễn Thị Ánh Viên (VIE)	4:37.71 CR	Sakiko Shimizu (JPN)	4:40.29	Yui Ohashi (JPN)	4:44.75
4×100m freestyle	China (CHN); Sun Meichen (54.90); Tang Yi (54.78); Shen Duo (54.16); Zhu Menghui (53.26)	3:37.10 CR	Japan (JPN); Rikako Ikee (53.72); Tomomi Aoki (54.32); Yui Yamane (54.87); Sayuki Ouchi (54.80)	3:37.71	Hong Kong (HKG); Sze Hang Yu (56.46); Claudia Lau (57.08); Yu (57.36); Chan (56.95)	3:47.85
4×200m freestyle	China (CHN); Shen Duo (1:59.37); Zhang Yuhan (1:58.34); Ai Yanhan (1:58.12); Wang Shijia (1:59.15)	7:54.98 CR	Japan (JPN); Chihiro Igarashi (1:59.68); Sachi Mochida (2:00.15); Tomomi Aoki (2:00.36); Rikako Ikee (1:57.88)	7:58.07	Hong Kong (HKG); Sze Hang Yu (2:01.70); Tang (2:03.25); Claudia Lau (2:04.28); Chan (2:07.14)	8:16.37
4×100m medley	Japan (JPN); Emi Moronuki (1:00.98); Misaki Sekiguchi (1:06.42); Rikako Ikee (56.18); Tomomi Aoki (54.39)	3:57.97 CR	China (CHN); Fu Yuanhui (1:00.66); Shi Jinglin (1:07.45); Zhang Yufei (57.32); Zhu Menghui (53.15)	3:58.58	Hong Kong (HKG); Wong (1:02.33); Ip (1:11.32); Chan (1:00.39); Sze Hang Yu (56.54)	4:10.58

=== Swimming Medal Table ===
Rank	Nation	Gold	Silver	Bronze	Total
1	China (CHN)	18	18	13	49
2	Japan (JPN)	15	19	15	49
3	South Korea (KOR)	4	0	1	5
4	Vietnam (VIE)	1	0	3	4
5	Hong Kong (HKG)	0	1	3	4
6	Chinese Taipei (TPE)	0	0	2	2
7	Indonesia (INA)	0	0	1	1
Totals (7 entries)		38	38	38	114

=== Synchronized Swimming ===
Event	Gold	Silver	Bronze
Solo technical routine	Yukiko Inui (JPN)	Wang Ciyue (CHN)	Anastasiya Ruzmetova (UZB)
Solo free routine	Yukiko Inui (JPN)	Dai Shiyi (CHN)	Gulsanam Yuldasheva (UZB)
Duet technical routine	Japan (JPN); Yukiko Inui; Mai Nakamura	China (CHN); Dai Shiyi; Xiao Yanning	Kazakhstan (KAZ); Alexandra Nemich; Yekaterina Nemich
Duet free routine	Japan (JPN); Yukiko Inui; Kanami Nakamaki	China (CHN); Feng Yu; Li Mo	Uzbekistan (UZB); Yuliya Kim; Khurshida Khakimova
Team technical routine	Japan (JPN); Sakiko Akutsu; Juka Fukumura; Aiko Hayashi; Minami Kono; Kei Marumo; Kanami Nakamaki; Asuka Tasaki; Maiko Yamazaki	China (CHN); Chang Hao; Feng Yu; Huang Qiaoyan; Ju Jiahui; Li Mo; Wang Ciyue; Xiao Yanning; Zhang Yayi	Kazakhstan (KAZ); Yana Degtyareva; Yelena Krylova; Alina Matkova; Aida Meimantay; Yekaterina Simonova; Daniya Talgatova; Kristina Tynybayeva; Olga Yezdakova
Team free routine	Japan (JPN); Sakiko Akutsu; Juka Fukumura; Aiko Hayashi; Yukiko Inui; Minami Kitahama; Kei Marumo; Kanami Nakamaki; Mai Nakamura	China (CHN); Feng Yu; Huang Qiaoyan; Xiang Yun'an; Li Mo; Wang Ciyue; Xiao Yanning; Chen Yan; Dai Shiyi	Kazakhstan (KAZ); Yelena Krylova; Alina Matkova; Aida Meimantay; Yekaterina Simonova; Daniya Talgatova; Kristina Tynybayeva; Olga Yezdakova; Renata Konovalenko
Highlight routine	Japan (JPN); Sakiko Akutsu; Juka Fukumura; Aiko Hayashi; Minami Kono; Minami Kitahama; Kei Marumo; Yuriko Osawa; Mai Nakamura; Asuka Tasaki; Maiko Yamazaki	China (CHN); Chang Hao; Dai Shiyi; Feng Yu; Huang Qiaoyan; Ju Jiahui; Li Mo; Sheng Shuwen; Xiang Yun'an; Xiao Yanning; Zhang Yayi	Kazakhstan (KAZ); Yana Degtyareva; Renata Konovalenko; Yelena Krylova; Alina Matkova; Alexandra Nemich; Yekaterina Nemich; Yekaterina Simonova; Daniya Talgatova; Kristina Tynybayeva; Olga Yezdakova
Free routine combination	Japan (JPN); Sakiko Akutsu; Juka Fukumura; Aiko Hayashi; Yukiko Inui; Minami Kono; Kei Marumo; Kanami Nakamaki; Yuriko Osawa; Mai Nakamura; Asuka Tasaki	China (CHN); Chang Hao; Chen Yan; Dai Shiyi; Fan Jiayi; Feng Yu; Ju Jiahui; Li Mo; Sheng Shuwen; Xiang Yun'an; Xiao Yanning	Kazakhstan (KAZ); Yana Degtyareva; Renata Konovalenko; Yelena Krylova; Alina Matkova; Alexandra Nemich; Yekaterina Nemich; Yekaterina Simonova; Daniya Talgatova; Kristina Tynybayeva; Olga Yezdakova

=== Synchronized Swimming Medal Table ===
Rank	Nation	Gold	Silver	Bronze	Total
1	Japan (JPN)	8	0	0	8
2	China (CHN)	0	8	0	8
3	Kazakhstan (KAZ)	0	0	5	5
4	Uzbekistan (UZB)	0	0	3	3
Totals (4 entries)		8	8	8	24

=== Diving ===
Event	Gold		Silver		Bronze	
Men's 3m Springboard	(CHN)		(JPN)		(JPN)	
Men's Synchronised 3m Springboard	Huang Bowen & Xie Siyi (CHN)	404.37	Ooi Tze Liang & Chew Yi Wei (MAS)	372.81	Yuto Araki & Eiji Hasegawa (JPN)	337.11
Men's 10m Platform	(CHN)		(CHN)		(JPN)	
Men's Synchronized 10m Platform	(CHN)		(JPN)		(IRI)	
Women's 3m Springboard	(CHN)		(JPN)		(MAC)	
Women's Synchronized 3m Springboard	(CHN)		(CHN)		(JPN)	
Women's 10m Platform	Si Yajie (CHN)	366.70	Lian Jie (CHN)	349.20	Minami Itahashi (JPN)	332.65
Women's Synchronized 10m Platform	(CHN)		(JPN)		(MAS)	

=== Diving medal table ===
Rank	Nation	Gold	Silver	Bronze	Total
1	China (CHN)	8	3	0	11
2	Japan (JPN)	0	4	5	9
3	Malaysia (MAS)	0	1	1	2
4	Iran (IRI)	0	0	1	1
4	Macau (MAC)	0	0	1	1
Totals (5 entries)		8	8	8	24

=== Water Polo ===
Event	Gold	Silver	Bronze
Men's Tournament	Japan (JPN)	Kazakhstan (KAZ)	China (CHN)
Women's Tournament	China (CHN)	Japan (JPN)	Kazakhstan (KAZ)

==== Men ====
A: Hong Kong - Singapore - Iran - Kazakhstan

B: China - Japan - Philippines - Saudi Arabia

1. KAZ 3W 0L 57-6 +51
2. IRI 2W 1L 31-26 +5
3. SIN 1W 2L 16-30 -14
4. HKG 0W 3L 13-55 -42
1. JPN 3W 0L 62-6 +56
2. CHN 2W 1L 41-20 +21
3. KSA 1W 2L 16-37 -21
4. PHI 0W 3L 14-70 -56

A:

1. Kazakhstan 14 - 4 Iran
2. Kazakhstan 25 - 1 Hong Kong
3. Kazakhstan 18 - 1 Singapore
4. Iran 19 - 8 Hong Kong
5. Iran 8 - 4 Singapore
6. Hong Kong 4 - 11 Singapore

B:

1. Japan 10 - 3 China
2. Japan 16 - 3 Saudi Arabia
3. Japan 36 - 0 Philippines
4. China 14 - 3 Saudi Arabia
5. China 24 - 7 Philippines
6. Saudi Arabia 10 - 7 Philippines

(Quarterfinal)

1. Kazakhstan 23 - 3 Philippines
2. Iran 15 - 6 Saudi Arabia
3. China 11 - 3 Singapore
4. Japan 21 - 2 Hong Kong

(Semmifinal)

1. Saudi Arabia 12 - 5 Hong Kong
2. Singapore 9 - 7 Philippines
3. Kazakhstan 8 - 6 China
4. Japan 15 - 6 Iran

(Final)

1. Hong Kong 11 - 4 Philippines
2. Singapore 9 - 7 Saudi Arabia
3. China 7 - 7 Iran CHINA 4-1 WIN IN PENALTY
4. Japan 7 - 6 Kazakhstan

==== Women ====
1. China 6W 0L 99-22 +77
2. Japan 5W 1L 93-29 +64
3. Kazakhstan 4W 2L 83-29 +54
4. Uzbekistan 3W 3L 45-64 -19
5. Thailand 2W 4L 40-71 -31
6. Singapore 1W 5L 26-83 -57
7. Hong Kong 0W 6L 16-104 -88

1. China 21 - 1 Hong Kong
2. China 10 - 7 Japan
3. China 8 - 7 Kazakhstan
4. China 23 - 2 Singapore
5. China 18 - 2 Thailand
6. China 19 - 3 Uzbekistan

1. Japan 22 - 3 Hong Kong
2. Japan 10 - 7 Kazakhstan
3. Japan 21 - 2 Singapore
4. Japan 18 - 2 Thailand
5. Japan 15 - 5 Uzbekistan

1. Kazakhstan 22 - 1 Hong Kong
2. Kazakhstan 13 - 1 Singapore
3. Kazakhstan 19 - 5 Thailand
4. Kazakhstan 15 - 4 Uzbekistan

1. Uzbekistan 17 - 5 Hong Kong
2. Uzbekistan 9 - 5 Singapore
3. Uzbekistan 7 - 5 Thailand

1. Thailand 14 - 6 Singapore
2. Thailand 12 - 3 Hong Kong

1. Singapore 10 - 3 Hong Kong

=== Water Polo Medal Table ===
Rank	Nation	Gold	Silver	Bronze	Total
1	Japan (JPN)	1	1	0	2
2	China (CHN)	1	0	1	2
3	Kazakhstan (KAZ)	0	1	1	2
Totals (3 entries)		2	2	2	6

=== All Medal Table ===
Rank	Nation	Gold	Silver	Bronze	Total
1	China (CHN)	27	29	14	70
2	Japan (JPN)	25	24	19	68
3	South Korea (KOR)	4	0	1	5
4	Vietnam (VIE)	1	0	3	4
5	Kazakhstan (KAZ)	0	1	6	7
6	Hong Kong (HKG)	0	1	3	4
7	Malaysia (MAS)	0	1	1	2
8	Uzbekistan (UZB)	0	0	3	3
9	Chinese Taipei (TPE)	0	0	2	2
10	Indonesia (INA)	0	0	1	1
10	Iran (IRI)	0	0	1	1
10	Macau (MAC)	0	0	1	1
Totals (12 entries)		57	56	55	168
