= Swimming at the 2016 Summer Olympics – Men's 200 metre butterfly =

Men's 200 metre butterfly at the Games of the XXXI Olympiad
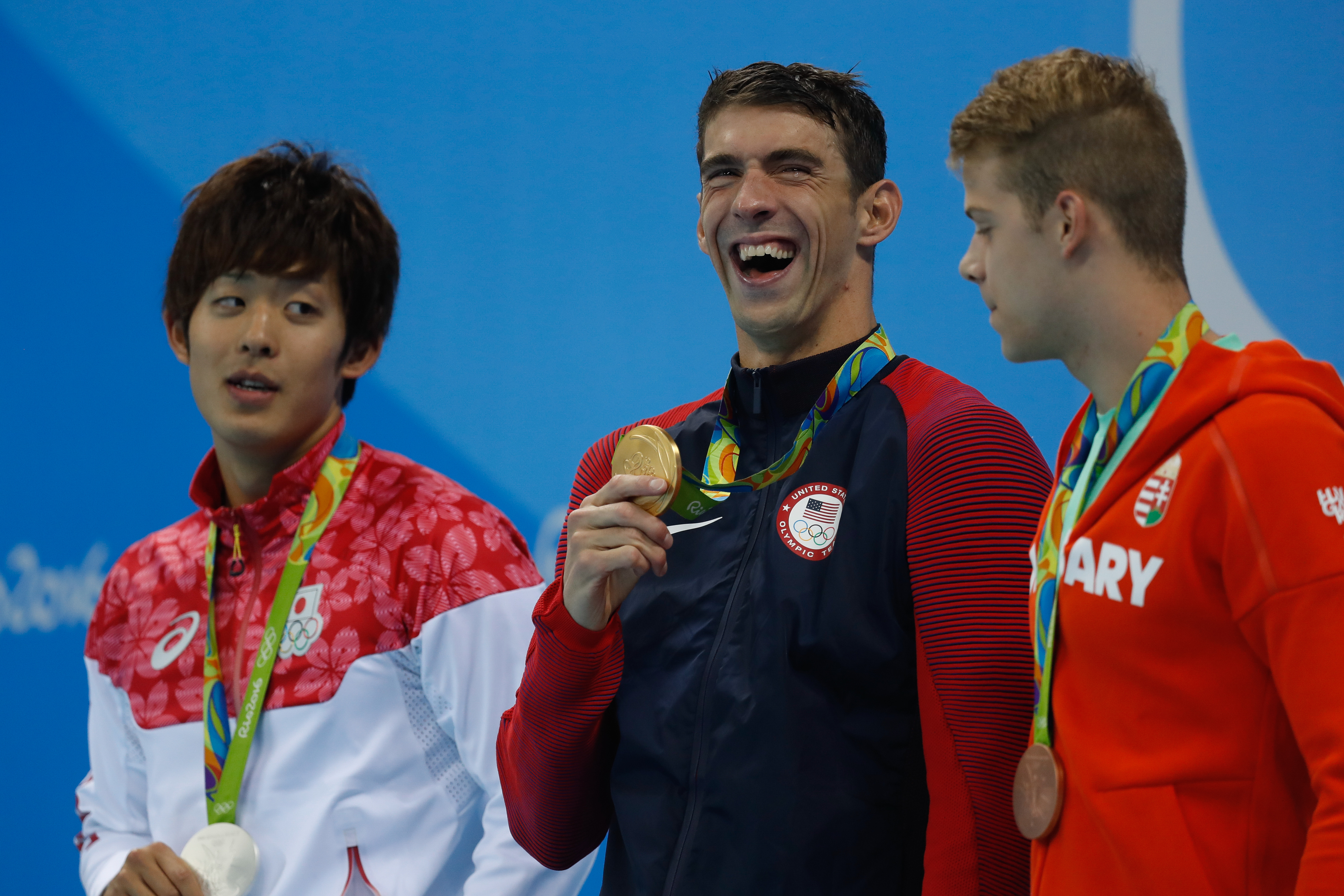
- Victory Ceremony
- Venue: Olympic Aquatics Stadium
- Dates: 8 August 2016 (heats & semifinals); 9 August 2016 (final)
- Competitors: 29 from 21 nations
- Winning time: 1:53.36

Medalists
1st place, gold medalist(s)		Michael Phelps	United States
2nd place, silver medalist(s)		Masato Sakai	Japan
3rd place, bronze medalist(s)		Tamás Kenderesi	Hungary

The men's 200 metre butterfly event at the 2016 Summer Olympics took place on 8–9 August at the Olympic Aquatics Stadium.

== Summary ==
As the most decorated Olympian of all-time, Michael Phelps got the opportunity to avenge the distance butterfly title that he lost in London four years earlier, when South Africa's Chad le Clos beat him to the wall. Moving to the front at the halfway turn, Phelps held off the Japanese challenger Masato Sakai by a 0.04-second margin to claim his twentieth Olympic gold medal and twenty-fifth overall in 1:53.36. Coming from sixth at the 150-metre turn, Sakai made a late surge on the final length to nearly upset Phelps towards a close finish, but he ended up taking the silver in 1:53.40. Meanwhile, Hungary's top seed and 2014 Youth Olympic champion Tamás Kenderesi powered home with a bronze in 1:53.62.

Le Clos did not produce another striking effort to halt the most decorated Olympian from snatching the title, as he was shut out of the medals to fourth in 1:54.06. Sakai's teammate Daiya Seto finished fifth in 1:54.82, with Denmark's Viktor Bromer following him to pick up the sixth spot in 1:55.64. Hungarian swimmer, 2008 Olympic silver medalist, and reigning world champion László Cseh commanded a brief lead on the initial length, but faded shortly to seventh place in 1:56.24. Belgium's Louis Croenen rounded out the field with an eighth-place time in 1:57.04.

== Records ==
Prior to this competition, the existing world and Olympic records were as follows.

World record	Michael Phelps (USA)	1:51.51	Rome, Italy	29 July 2009
Olympic record	Michael Phelps (USA)	1:52.03	Beijing, China	13 August 2008

== Competition format ==
The competition consisted of three rounds: heats, semifinals, and a final. The swimmers with the best 16 times in the heats advanced to the semifinals. The swimmers with the best 8 times in the semifinals advanced to the final. Swim-offs were used as necessary to break ties for advancement to the next round.

== Results ==
=== Heats ===
Rank	Heat	Lane	Name	Nationality	Time	Notes
1	3	3	Tamás Kenderesi	Hungary	1:54.73	Q
2	4	4	László Cseh	Hungary	1:55.14	Q
3	2	4	Chad le Clos	South Africa	1:55.57	Q
4	3	2	Grant Irvine	Australia	1:55.64	Q
5	3	4	Michael Phelps	United States	1:55.73	Q
6	2	5	Masato Sakai	Japan	1:55.76	Q
7	4	3	Viktor Bromer	Denmark	1:55.77	Q
8	3	5	Daiya Seto	Japan	1:55.79	Q
9	4	6	Leonardo de Deus	Brazil	1:55.98	Q
10	2	7	Quah Zheng Wen	Singapore	1:56.01	Q
11	2	3	Evgeny Koptelov	Russia	1:56.13	Q
12	4	7	Kaio de Almeida	Brazil	1:56.45	Q
13	1	4	Simon Sjödin	Sweden	1:56.46	Q
14	3	6	Louis Croenen	Belgium	1:56.48	Q
15	4	8	Jonathan Gómez	Colombia	1:56.65	Q
16	2	6	Li Zhuhao	China	1:56.72	Q
17	4	5	Jan Świtkowski	Poland	1:56.73	
18	3	7	Stefanos Dimitriadis	Greece	1:56.76	
19	4	2	David Morgan	Australia	1:56.81	
20	2	2	Tom Shields	United States	1:56.93	
21	3	1	Carlos Peralta	Spain	1:56.98	
22	1	5	Robert Žbogar	Slovenia	1:57.05	
23	4	1	Sebastien Rousseau	South Africa	1:57.33	
24	2	8	Daniil Pakhomov	Russia	1:57.36	
25	2	1	Jordan Coelho	France	1:58.62	
26	1	6	Gal Nevo	Israel	1:58.64	
27	3	8	Wu Yuhang	China	1:59.04	
28	1	3	Sajan Prakash	India	1:59.37	
29	1	2	Bradlee Ashby	New Zealand	2:01.22	

=== Semifinals ===
==== Semifinal 1 ====
Rank	Lane	Name	Nationality	Time	Notes
1	4	László Cseh	Hungary	1:55.18	Q
2	6	Daiya Seto	Japan	1:55.28	Q
3	3	Masato Sakai	Japan	1:55.32	Q
4	1	Louis Croenen	Belgium	1:56.03	Q
5	5	Grant Irvine	Australia	1:56.07	
6	2	Quah Zheng Wen	Singapore	1:56.11	
7	7	Kaio de Almeida	Brazil	1:57.45	
8	8	Li Zhuhao	China	1:57.62	

==== Semifinal 2 ====
Rank	Lane	Name	Nationality	Time	Notes
1	4	Tamás Kenderesi	Hungary	1:53.96	Q
2	3	Michael Phelps	United States	1:54.12	Q
3	5	Chad le Clos	South Africa	1:55.19	Q
4	6	Viktor Bromer	Denmark	1:55.59	Q
5	7	Evgeny Koptelov	Russia	1:56.46	
6	1	Simon Sjödin	Sweden	1:56.71	
7	2	Leonardo de Deus	Brazil	1:56.77	
8	8	Jonathan Gómez	Colombia	1:57.47	

=== Final ===
Rank	Lane	Name	Nationality	Time	Notes
1st place, gold medalist(s)	5	Michael Phelps	United States	1:53.36	
2nd place, silver medalist(s)	7	Masato Sakai	Japan	1:53.40	
3rd place, bronze medalist(s)	4	Tamás Kenderesi	Hungary	1:53.62	
4	6	Chad le Clos	South Africa	1:54.06	
5	2	Daiya Seto	Japan	1:54.82	
6	1	Viktor Bromer	Denmark	1:55.64	
7	3	László Cseh	Hungary	1:56.24	
8	8	Louis Croenen	Belgium	1:57.04	
