= Wu Yuhang =

Chinese swimmer

Personal information
- Born: 3 June 1997 (age 29)

Sport
- Sport: Swimming

Wu Yuhang (born 3 June 1997) is a Chinese swimmer. He competed in the men's 200 metre butterfly event at the 2016 Summer Olympics.
