= 2014 FINA World Junior Synchronised Swimming Championships =

International synchronised swimming competition

The 14th FINA World Junior Synchronised Swimming Championships was held July 30-August 3, 2014 in Helsinki, Finland. The synchronised swimmers are aged between 15 and 18 years old, from 34 nations, swimming in four events: Solo, Duet, Team and Free combination.

== Participating nations ==
34 nations swam at the 2014 World Junior Championships were:

- Austria
- Belarus
- Brazil
- Bulgaria
- Canada
- China
- Croatia
- Czech Republic
- Egypt
- Finland
- France
- Germany
- Greece
- Hungary
- Indonesia
- Israel
- Italy
- Japan
- Kazakhstan
- Mexico
- Netherlands
- Poland
- Puerto Rico
- Russia
- Serbia
- Slovakia
- South Africa
- Spain
- Switzerland
- Turkey
- Ukraine
- USA
- Uzbekistan
- Venezuela

== Results ==
Event	Gold		Silver		Bronze	
Solo details	Anisiya Neborako; Russia	171.1350	Jacqueline Simoneau; Canada	170.8927	Asuka Tasaki; Japan	168.7817
Duet details	Anastasia Bayandina; Daria Bayandina; Russia	168.8498	Kano Omata; Asuka Tasaki; Japan	168.7142	Wang Liuyi; Wang Qianyi; China	162.9053
Team details	Russia	167.9395	Japan	166.0544	China	162.9142
Free combination details	Japan	90.4000	Russia	90.3000	China	88.3667
