= Minami Itahashi =

Japanese diver (born 2000)

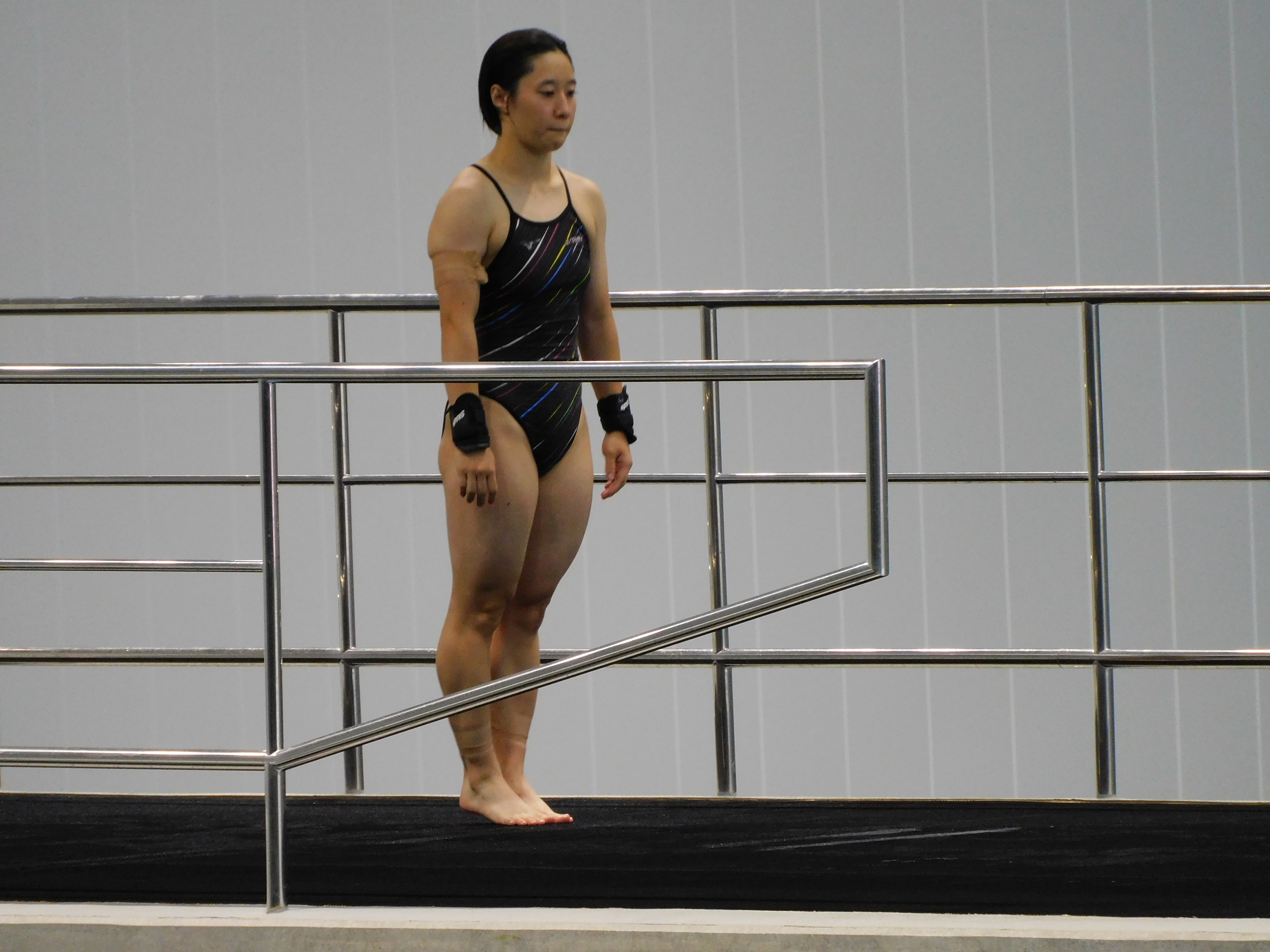

Personal information
- Native name: 板橋美波
- Born: 28 January 2000 (age 26) Takarazuka, Hyōgo, Japan
- Height: 1.50 m (4 ft 11 in)
- Weight: 45 kg (99 lb)

Sport
- Sport: Diving
- Retired: 19 September 2025
Medal record
Representing Japan
World Championships
Bronze medal – third place	2023 Fukuoka	10 m mixed synchro
Asian Games
Silver medal – second place	2022 Hangzhou	10 m synchro
Asian Swimming Championships
Bronze medal – third place	2016 Tokyo	10m platform
Diving Grand Prix
Gold medal – first place	2016 San Juan	3m springboard
Gold medal – first place	2016 Bolzano	10m platform
Gold medal – first place	2017 Gatineau	10m mixed synchro
Silver medal – second place	2014 Bolzano	10m platform
Silver medal – second place	2014 Bolzano	10m synchro
Silver medal – second place	2015 San Juan	10m platform
Silver medal – second place	2016 Gatineau	10m platform
Silver medal – second place	2016 Singapore	3m springboard
Silver medal – second place	2019 Kuala Lumpur	10m synchro
Silver medal – second place	2019 Singapur	10m synchro
Bronze medal – third place	2015 Bolzano	10m platform
Bronze medal – third place	2017 Gatineau	10m platform
Diving World Series
Bronze medal – third place	2018 Fuji	10m platform
Bronze medal – third place	2018 Fuji	10m mixed synchro
Bronze medal – third place	2019 Sagamihara	10m mixed synchro

Minami Itahashi (板橋美波, Itahashi Minami; born 28 January 2000) is a retired Japanese diver. She has represented Japan at various international events since the age of 14, including the 2015 World Aquatics Championships, the 2016 Summer Olympics, and the 2020 Summer Olympics. She retired from diving in September of 2025.

== Early life ==
Itahashi was born in Takarazuka, Hyōgo Prefecture. She commenced swimming at the JSS swimming school in Takarazuka when in her first grade of elementary school. When in the third grade she switched to diving after first participating in a one-month course. Her father is a former judo player. Her coach at JSS is Suuei Mabuchi, who is also head coach of the national diving team.

== Diving career ==
In 2013, when a second grade student at Gotenyama Junior High School, Itahashi finished third in the 10m platform event of the national championships. Her performance earned her selection to compete at the 2013 East Asian Games, her first international event. At the Games she finished 5th in the 1m springboard event and 7th in the 3m springboard event.

In June 2014 Itahashi won the 10m platform event at the national indoor invitational championships, followed by wins in the platform and springboard events at the national junior high school championships in August. In September 2014, Itahashi won the 3m springboard event at the Japanese national championships and earned selection for the 2014 Asian Games. Her victory at the national championships at the age of 14 years and 8 months made her the youngest person to win a springboard diving event in the 90-year history of the championships. At the Asian Games in October 2014, Itahashi finished in 5th in the platform event and 7th in the 3m springboard event.

In July 2015 Itahashi competed in the 3m springboard event and the 10m platform event at the World Aquatics Championships held in Russia. In the preliminary round of the 10m platform event, she successfully completed a 109C dive (a forward dive with 4 1/2 turns in the tuck position), the first woman to do so at an international competition. She advanced to the semi-finals in 6th position, but an error in a subsequent dive saw her fall to 16th place and miss out on a berth in the final.

In February 2016 Itahashi secured a berth at the Rio Olympics by qualifying for the final of the 10m platform event at the 2016 FINA Diving World Cup. She failed to qualify in the 3m springboard event however, finishing 22nd in the qualifying round. At the 2016 Olympic Games she finished eighth in the 10m platform diving. In November 2016, Itahashi claimed a silver medal in the 3m springboard event at a grand prix event in Singapore, followed by a bronze medal in the 10m platform event at the 2016 Asian Swimming Championships.

In 2023, at the 2022 Asian Games in Hangzhou, China, Itahashi won silver with Matsuri Arai in 10 metre synchro.
