= Minami Kono =

Japanese synchronized swimmer

Personal information
- National team: Japan
- Born: 15 August 1996 (age 30) Tokyo, Japan
- Height: 1.63 m (5 ft 4 in)

Sport
- Sport: Swimming
- Strokes: Synchronized swimming
Medal record
Women's synchronized swimming
Representing Japan
World Championships
Bronze medal – third place	2017 Budapest	Team technical routine
Bronze medal – third place	2017 Budapest	Free routine combination
Asian Championships
Gold medal – first place	2016 Tokyo	Team technical routine
Gold medal – first place	2016 Tokyo	Team free routine
Gold medal – first place	2016 Tokyo	Team Highlights

Minami Kono (河野 みなみ, Kōno Minami; born 15 August 1996) is a Japanese synchronized swimmer.

She won two bronze medals at the 2017 World Aquatics Championships and three gold medals at the 2016 Asian Swimming Championships.
