= Juka Fukumura =

Japanese synchronized swimmer

Personal information
- National team: Japan
- Born: 6 June 1996 (age 30) Kyoto Prefecture, Japan
- Height: 1.71 m (5 ft 7 in)

Sport
- Sport: Swimming
- Strokes: Synchronized swimming
Medal record
Women's synchronized swimming
Representing Japan
World Championships
| Bronze medal – third place | 2017 Budapest | Team technical routine |
| Bronze medal – third place | 2017 Budapest | Free routine combination |
Asian Games
| Silver medal – second place | 2018 Jakarta | Team routine |
Asian Championships
| Gold medal – first place | 2016 Tokyo | Team technical routine |
| Gold medal – first place | 2016 Tokyo | Team free routine |
| Gold medal – first place | 2016 Tokyo | Free routine combination |
| Gold medal – first place | 2016 Tokyo | Team Highlights |

Juka Fukumura (福村 寿華, Fukumura Juka; born 6 June 1996) is a Japanese competitor in synchronized swimming.

She won 2 bronze medals at the 2017 World Aquatics Championships, 4 gold medals at the 2016 Asian Swimming Championships, and a silver medal at the 2018 Asian Games.
