= Yuriko Osawa =

Japanese synchronized swimmer

Personal information
- National team: Japan
- Born: 25 July 1996 (age 30) Tokyo, Japan
- Height: 1.60 m (5 ft 3 in)

Sport
- Sport: Swimming
- Strokes: Synchronized swimming
Medal record
Women's synchronized swimming
Representing Japan
World Championships
Bronze medal – third place	2017 Budapest	Free routine combination
Asian Championships
Gold medal – first place	2016 Tokyo	Free routine combination
Gold medal – first place	2016 Tokyo	Team Highlights

Yuriko Osawa (大澤 友里子, Ōsawa Yuriko; born 25 July 1996) is a Japanese competitor in synchronized swimming.

She won 1 bronze medal at the 2017 World Aquatics Championships and 2 gold medals at the 2016 Asian Swimming Championships.
