= Yasunari Hirai =

Japanese swimmer (born 1990)

Personal information
- Born: April 2, 1990 (age 36) Abiko, Chiba, Japan

Sport
- Sport: Swimming
Medal record
Representing Japan
Summer Universiade
Bronze medal – third place	2011 Shenzhen	10km marathon

Yasunari Hirai (平井 康翔, Hirai Yasunari; born 2 April 1990) is a Japanese professional swimmer, specialising in open water swimming. He competed at the 2012 Summer Olympics and 2016 Olympics, finishing in 15th and 8th place respectively.
