= Sakiko Akutsu =

Japanese synchronized swimmer (born 1988)

Personal information
- National team: Japan
- Born: 20 January 1998 (age 28) Tokyo, Japan
- Height: 1.71 m (5 ft 7 in)

Sport
- Sport: Swimming
- Strokes: Synchronized swimming
Medal record
Women's synchronized swimming
Representing Japan
World Championships
Bronze medal – third place	2017 Budapest	Team technical routine
Bronze medal – third place	2017 Budapest	Free routine combination
Asian Championships
Gold medal – first place	2016 Tokyo	Team technical routine
Gold medal – first place	2016 Tokyo	Team free routine
Gold medal – first place	2016 Tokyo	Free routine combination
Gold medal – first place	2016 Tokyo	Team Highlights
World Junior Championships
Bronze medal – third place	2016 Kazan	Duet routine

Sakiko Akutsu (阿久津 咲子, Akutsu Sakiko; born 20 January 1998) is a Japanese synchronized swimmer. She won 2 bronze medals at the 2017 World Aquatics Championships and 4 gold medals at the 2016 Asian Swimming Championships.
