= Kano Omata =

Japanese synchronized swimmer

Personal information
- National team: Japan
- Born: 24 July 1996 (age 29) Chigasaki, Kanagawa Prefecture, Japan
- Height: 1.60 m (5 ft 3 in)

Sport
- Sport: Swimming
- Strokes: Synchronized swimming
Medal record
Women's synchronized swimming
Representing Japan
Olympic Games
Bronze medal – third place	2016 Rio de Janeiro	Team
World Championships
Bronze medal – third place	2015 Kazan	Team Technical Routine
Bronze medal – third place	2015 Kazan	Free Routine Combination
Bronze medal – third place	2017 Budapest	Team technical routine
Bronze medal – third place	2017 Budapest	Free routine combination
Asian Games
Silver medal – second place	2018 Jakarta	Team Routine

Kano Omata (小俣 夏乃, Omata Kano; born 24 July 1996) is a Japanese competitor in synchronized swimming.

== Early life and education ==
Omata was born in Chigasaki, Kanagawa, on 24 July 1996. She graduated from Asao Hugh School in Kawasaki in 2015.

Omata attended Kokushikan University in Setagaya, Tokyo, and graduated with an undergraduate degree from the Faculty of Physical Education in 2019, and a graduate degree from the Graduate School of Sports and Systems in 2021.

== Career ==
=== World Junior Championships ===
Yoshida won a silver at the 2012 FINA World Junior Synchronised Swimming Championships, and 1 gold and 2 silvers at the 2014 FINA World Junior Synchronised Swimming Championships.

=== World Championships ===
Yoshida won 2 bronze medals at the 2015 World Aquatics Championships, in the Team Technical Routine and Free Routine Combination events.

=== Japan Open ===
Omata was part of the a Japanese synchronised swimming team which beat 19 other countries to win the 2017 Japan Open Synchronised Swimming Championships title in the technical routine event.

=== Japan Championships ===
Omata won the solo competition at the Japan Artistic Swimming Championships in 2020.

=== Semi-retirement ===
Omata retired from active regular competition in 2020, but competed in 5 events in the 2023 World Masters Swimming Championships in Fukuoka, Japan. She competed in the duet (technical routine), team (technical routine, free routine), and solo (technical routine, free routine) events, winning gold in all three events.

== Personal life ==
After graduating from Kokushikan University, Yoshida joined the university as a staff member. She is working with the synchronized swimming club to pass on her skills to future athletes.
