= Masato Sakai (swimmer) =

Japanese swimmer (born 1995)

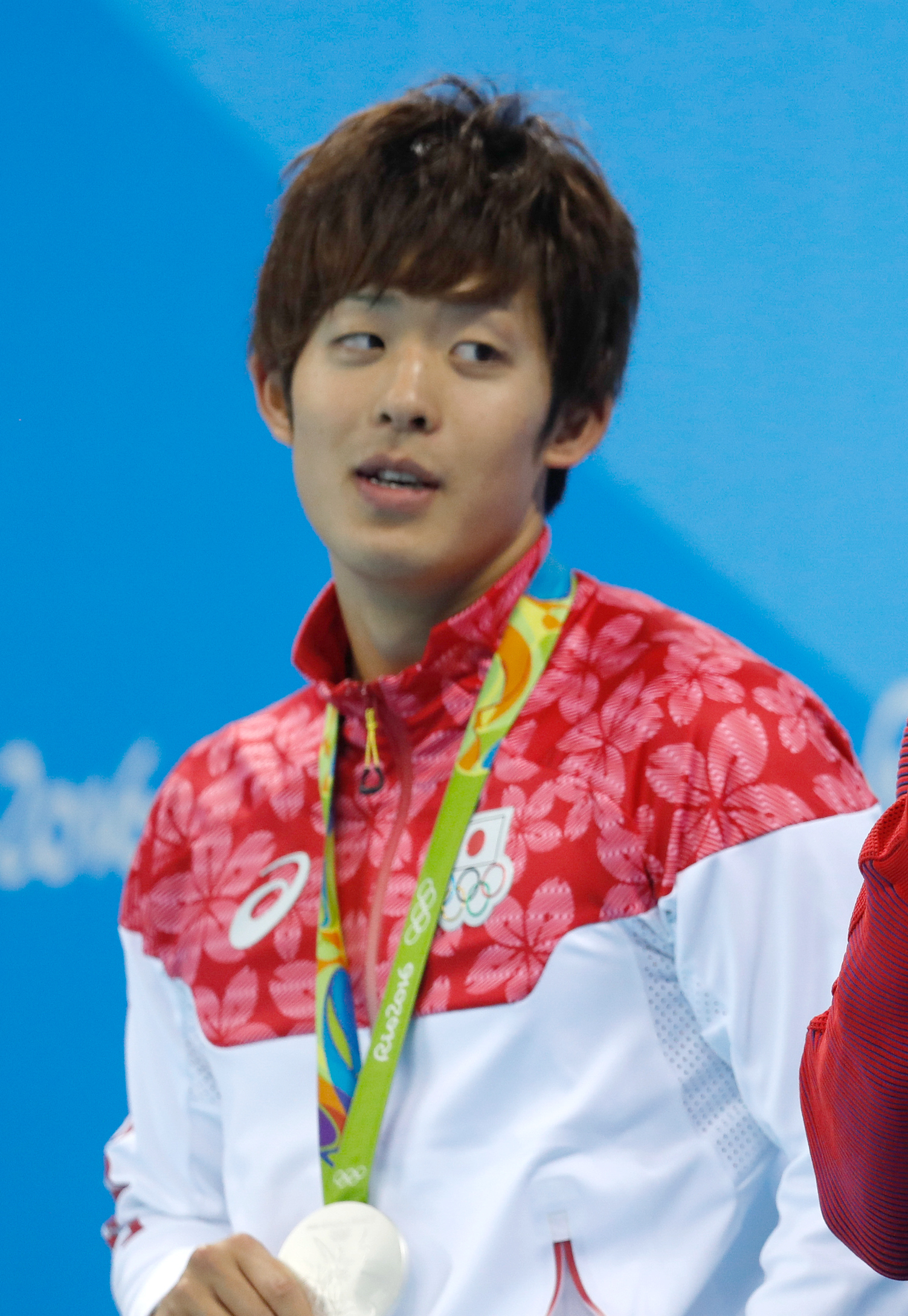
- Sakai at the 2016 Olympics

Personal information
- Nationality: Japanese
- Born: 6 June 1995 (age 31) Yanagawa, Japan
- Height: 1.81 m (5 ft 11 in)
- Weight: 77 kg (170 lb)

Sport
- Sport: Swimming
- Strokes: Butterfly
- Club: Waseda University
- College team: Waseda University
Medal record
Representing Japan
Olympic Games
Silver medal – second place	2016 Rio de Janeiro	200 m butterfly
Asian Swimming Championships
Gold medal – first place	2016 Tokyo	200 m butterfly
Silver medal – second place	2016 Tokyo	100 m butterfly
World Junior Championships
Silver medal – second place	2013 Dubai	200 m butterfly

Masato Sakai (坂井 聖人, Sakai Masato; born 6 June 1995) is a Japanese swimmer who specializes in the men's 200 metre butterfly. He won the silver medal in the men's 200 metre butterfly event at the 2016 Summer Olympics. Sakai was in 6th position at the 150 mark, and finished 0.04 seconds behind Michael Phelps.

At the 2015 World Aquatics Championships in Kazan, Sakai finished 4th in the 200 metre butterfly, 0.14 seconds outside the medals.
