= Mai Nakamura (synchronized swimmer) =

Japanese synchronized swimmer

Personal information
- Born: 13 January 1989 (age 37) Kobe, Japan
- Height: 1.63 m (5 ft 4 in)

Sport
- Country: Japan
- Sport: Synchronized swimming
- Club: Imura Synchro Club
Medal record
Synchronized swimming
Representing Japan
Olympic Games
Bronze medal – third place	2016 Rio de Janeiro	Team
World Championships
Bronze medal – third place	2015 Kazan	Team technical routine
Bronze medal – third place	2015 Kazan	Team free routine
Bronze medal – third place	2015 Kazan	Free routine combination
Bronze medal – third place	2017 Budapest	Team technical routine
Bronze medal – third place	2017 Budapest	Free routine combination
Asian Games
Silver medal – second place	2010 Guangzhou	Women's team
Silver medal – second place	2010 Guangzhou	Women's combination
Silver medal – second place	2014 Incheon	Women's team
Silver medal – second place	2014 Incheon	Women's combination
Asian Championships
Gold medal – first place	2016 Tokyo	Duet technical routine
Gold medal – first place	2016 Tokyo	Team free routine
Gold medal – first place	2016 Tokyo	Free routine combination
Gold medal – first place	2016 Tokyo	Team Highlights

Mai Nakamura (中村 麻衣, Nakamura Mai; born 13 January 1989) is a Japanese synchronized swimmer. She competed in the women's team event at the 2012 Olympic Games and was part of the Japanese team that won bronze at the 2016 Olympics.

She took up the sport at the age of seven, and made her international debut in 2009 at the World Championships in Rome.

She retired in September 2017.
