= Asuka Tasaki =

Japanese synchronized swimmer

Personal information
- National team: Japan
- Born: 28 May 1997 (age 29) Osaka, Osaka Prefecture, Japan
- Height: 1.62 m (5 ft 4 in)

Sport
- Sport: Swimming
- Strokes: Synchronized swimming
Medal record
Women's synchronized swimming
Representing Japan
World Championships
Bronze medal – third place	2015 Kazan	Free Routine Combination
Bronze medal – third place	2017 Budapest	Free routine combination
Asian Championships
Gold medal – first place	2016 Tokyo	Team technical routine
Gold medal – first place	2016 Tokyo	Free routine combination
Gold medal – first place	2016 Tokyo	Team Highlights

Asuka Tasaki (田崎 明日花, Tasaki Asuka; born 28 May 1997) is a Japanese competitor in synchronized swimming.

She won a bronze medal at the 2015 World Aquatics Championships. She also won 1 gold, 2 silvers and 1 bronze at the 2014 FINA World Junior Synchronised Swimming Championships.
