= Swimming at the 2018 European Aquatics Championships – Men's 200 metre breaststroke =

Men's 200 metre breaststroke at the 2018 European Aquatics Championships
- Venue: Tollcross International Swimming Centre
- Dates: 5 August (heats and semifinals); 6 August (final)
- Competitors: 32 from 21 nations
- Winning time: 2:06.80

Medalists
gold medal	Anton Chupkov	Russia
silver medal	James Wilby	Great Britain
bronze medal	Luca Pizzini	Italy

The Men's 200 metre breaststroke competition of the 2018 European Aquatics Championships was held on 5 and 6 August 2018.

== Records ==
Prior to the competition, the existing world and championship records were as follows.

	Name	Nation	Time	Location	Date
World record	Ippei Watanabe	Japan	2:06.67	Tokyo	29 January 2017
European record	Anton Chupkov	Russia	2:06.96	Budapest	28 July 2017
Championship record	Marco Koch	Germany	2:07.47	Berlin	21 August 2014

The following new records were set during this competition.

Date	Event	Name	Nationality	Time	Record
6 August	Final	Anton Chupkov	Russia	2:06.80	CR, ER

== Results ==
=== Heats ===
The heats were started on 5 August at 10:32.

Rank	Heat	Lane	Name	Nationality	Time	Notes
1	4	4	Anton Chupkov	Russia	2:07.70	Q
2	4	5	Kirill Prigoda	Russia	2:08.91	Q
3	3	5	Ilya Khomenko	Russia	2:09.63	
4	4	3	Luca Pizzini	Italy	2:10.18	Q
5	3	4	Ross Murdoch	Great Britain	2:10.30	Q
6	2	4	James Wilby	Great Britain	2:10.81	Q
7	2	5	Arno Kamminga	Netherlands	2:10.82	Q
8	3	2	Darragh Greene	Ireland	2:11.22	Q
9	3	3	Mikhail Dorinov	Russia	2:11.29	
10	4	2	Matti Mattsson	Finland	2:11.44	Q
11	2	0	Mykyta Koptyelov	Ukraine	2:11.50	Q
12	4	1	Andrius Šidlauskas	Lithuania	2:11.52	Q
13	3	1	Valentin Bayer	Austria	2:11.73	Q
14	2	2	Dávid Horváth	Hungary	2:11.85	Q
15	2	3	Erik Persson	Sweden	2:12.43	Q
16	2	1	Jacques Laeuffer	Switzerland	2:12.57	Q
17	2	7	Christopher Rothbauer	Austria	2:12.61	Q
18	3	7	Bartłomiej Roguski	Poland	2:12.69	Q
19	2	6	Max Pilger	Germany	2:12.84	
20	4	6	Giedrius Titenis	Lithuania	2:13.16	
21	3	6	Yannick Käser	Switzerland	2:13.66	
22	4	7	Ilya Shymanovich	Belarus	2:13.85	
23	4	0	Martin Allikvee	Estonia	2:13.93	
24	2	9	Ivan Strilets	Ukraine	2:13.94	
25	4	8	Filip Chrápavý	Czech Republic	2:13.99	
26	3	9	Tomáš Klobučník	Slovakia	2:14.04	
27	3	0	Lyubomir Epitropov	Bulgaria	2:14.20	
28	2	8	Johannes Dietrich	Austria	2:14.30	
29	3	8	Daniils Bobrovs	Latvia	2:14.69	
30	1	4	Tomas Veloso	Portugal	2:15.95	
31	1	3	Lachezar Shumkov	Bulgaria	2:17.22	
32	1	2	Jozef Beňo	Slovakia	2:18.33	
	1	5	Berkay Öğretir	Turkey	Did not start	
	4	9	Teemu Vuorela	Finland	Did not start	

=== Semifinals ===
The semifinals were started on 5 August at 17:49.

==== Semifinal 1 ====
Rank	Lane	Name	Nationality	Time	Notes
1	5	Ross Murdoch	Great Britain	2:08.57	Q
2	4	Kirill Prigoda	Russia	2:08.63	Q
3	3	Arno Kamminga	Netherlands	2:10.00	Q
4	2	Andrius Šidlauskas	Lithuania	2:10.12	Q
5	6	Matti Mattsson	Finland	2:10.19	
6	7	Dávid Horváth	Hungary	2:10.70	
7	8	Bartłomiej Roguski	Poland	2:11.32	
8	1	Jacques Laeuffer	Switzerland	2:12.44	

==== Semifinal 2 ====
Rank	Lane	Name	Nationality	Time	Notes
1	4	Anton Chupkov	Russia	2:07.95	Q
2	5	Luca Pizzini	Italy	2:08.52	Q
3	3	James Wilby	Great Britain	2:09.59	Q
4	1	Erik Persson	Sweden	2:09.84	Q
5	2	Mykyta Koptyelov	Ukraine	2:10.41	
6	6	Darragh Greene	Ireland	2:11.36	
7	7	Valentin Bayer	Austria	2:12.33	
8	8	Christopher Rothbauer	Austria	2:12.44	

=== Final ===
The final was started on 6 August at 18:08.

Rank	Lane	Name	Nationality	Time	Notes
1st place, gold medalist(s)	4	Anton Chupkov	Russia	2:06.80	CR, ER
2nd place, silver medalist(s)	2	James Wilby	Great Britain	2:08.39	
3rd place, bronze medalist(s)	5	Luca Pizzini	Italy	2:08.54	
4	3	Ross Murdoch	Great Britain	2:08.55	
5	6	Kirill Prigoda	Russia	2:08.77	
6	8	Andrius Šidlauskas	Lithuania	2:09.71	
7	1	Arno Kamminga	Netherlands	2:09.87	
8	7	Erik Persson	Sweden	2:10.25	
