= Swimming at the 2019 World Aquatics Championships – Men's 200 metre breaststroke =

Men's 200 metre breaststroke at the 2019 World Aquatics Championships
- Venue: Nambu University Municipal Aquatics Center
- Location: Gwangju, South Korea
- Dates: 25 July (heats and semifinals); 26 July (final)
- Competitors: 54 from 46 nations
- Winning time: 2:06.12 WR

Medalists
| gold medal | Anton Chupkov | Russia |
| silver medal | Matthew Wilson | Australia |
| bronze medal | Ippei Watanabe | Japan |

The Men's 200 metre breaststroke competition at the 2019 World Championships was held on 25 and 26 July 2019.

== Records ==
Prior to the competition, the existing world and championship records were as follows.

| World record | Ippei Watanabe (JPN) | 2:06.67 | Tokyo, Japan | 29 January 2017 |
| Competition record | Anton Chupkov (RUS) | 2:06.96 | Budapest, Hungary | 28 July 2017 |

The following new records were set during this competition.

| Date | Event | Name | Nationality | Time | Record |
|---|---|---|---|---|---|
| 25 July | Semifinal 1 | Anton Chupkov | Russia | 2:06.83 | CR |
| 25 July | Semifinal 2 | Matthew Wilson | Australia | 2:06.67 | =WR |
| 26 July | Final | Anton Chupkov | Russia | 2:06.12 | WR |

== Results ==
=== Heats ===
The heats were held on 25 July at 11:08.

| Rank | Heat | Lane | Name | Nationality | Time | Notes |
|---|---|---|---|---|---|---|
| 1 | 4 | 4 | Matthew Wilson | Australia | 2:07.29 | Q |
| 2 | 6 | 4 | Anton Chupkov | Russia | 2:08.22 | Q |
| 3 | 5 | 3 | Marco Koch | Germany | 2:08.70 | Q |
| 4 | 4 | 2 | Erik Persson | Sweden | 2:08.87 | Q |
| 5 | 4 | 5 | Zac Stubblety-Cook | Australia | 2:09.05 | Q |
| 5 | 6 | 3 | Ross Murdoch | Great Britain | 2:09.05 | Q |
| 7 | 5 | 2 | Arno Kamminga | Netherlands | 2:09.39 | Q |
| 8 | 6 | 6 | Andrew Wilson | United States | 2:09.61 | Q |
| 9 | 5 | 4 | Ippei Watanabe | Japan | 2:09.68 | Q |
| 9 | 6 | 5 | Josh Prenot | United States | 2:09.68 | Q |
| 11 | 6 | 7 | Dmitriy Balandin | Kazakhstan | 2:09.72 | Q |
| 12 | 4 | 3 | Qin Haiyang | China | 2:09.86 | Q |
| 13 | 5 | 5 | James Wilby | Great Britain | 2:09.90 | Q |
| 14 | 4 | 6 | Kazuki Kohinata | Japan | 2:09.92 | Q |
| 15 | 4 | 8 | Mykyta Koptyelov | Ukraine | 2:09.94 | Q |
| 16 | 6 | 0 | Anton Sveinn McKee | Iceland | 2:10.32 | Q |
| 17 | 4 | 1 | Darragh Greene | Ireland | 2:10.61 | |
| 18 | 5 | 8 | Giedrius Titenis | Lithuania | 2:10.65 | |
| 19 | 5 | 0 | Martin Allikvee | Estonia | 2:10.66 | |
| 20 | 5 | 7 | Andrius Šidlauskas | Lithuania | 2:10.77 | |
| 21 | 5 | 6 | Luca Pizzini | Italy | 2:10.88 | |
| 22 | 4 | 7 | Zhang Ruixuan | China | 2:10.89 | |
| 23 | 6 | 1 | Maximilian Pilger | Germany | 2:11.35 | |
| 24 | 3 | 5 | Denis Petrashov | Kyrgyzstan | 2:11.65 | NR |
| 25 | 3 | 7 | Lyubomir Epitropov | Bulgaria | 2:11.78 | NR |
| 26 | 6 | 2 | Aleksandr Palatov | Russia | 2:12.06 | |
| 27 | 5 | 9 | Ilya Shymanovich | Belarus | 2:12.19 | |
| 28 | 3 | 4 | Valentin Bayer | Austria | 2:12.27 | |
| 29 | 4 | 0 | Dávid Horváth | Hungary | 2:12.83 | |
| 30 | 6 | 9 | Cho Sung-jae | South Korea | 2:13.48 | |
| 31 | 4 | 9 | Berkay-Ömer Öğretir | Turkey | 2:13.62 | |
| 32 | 3 | 2 | Alaric Basson | South Africa | 2:13.73 | |
| 33 | 6 | 8 | Matti Mattsson | Finland | 2:13.80 | |
| 34 | 3 | 1 | Tomáš Klobučník | Slovakia | 2:13.97 | |
| 35 | 2 | 7 | Amro Al-Wir | Jordan | 2:14.82 | NR |
| 36 | 3 | 9 | Phạm Thanh Bào | Vietnam | 2:14.90 | |
| 37 | 2 | 6 | Cai Bing-rong | Chinese Taipei | 2:15.18 | |
| 38 | 3 | 0 | Christoph Meier | Liechtenstein | 2:15.48 | |
| 39 | 2 | 2 | Gabriel Mastromatteo | Canada | 2:15.61 | |
| 40 | 3 | 8 | Carlos Mahecha | Colombia | 2:15.68 | |
| 41 | 3 | 6 | Dawid Szwedzki | Poland | 2:15.91 | |
| 42 | 2 | 4 | Daniils Bobrovs | Latvia | 2:17.07 | |
| 43 | 2 | 3 | Michael Ng | Hong Kong | 2:17.41 | |
| 44 | 2 | 9 | Adriel Sanes | Virgin Islands | 2:17.57 | |
| 45 | 3 | 3 | Yannick Käser | Switzerland | 2:17.79 | |
| 46 | 2 | 1 | Taichi Vakasama | Fiji | 2:18.23 | |
| 47 | 1 | 3 | Ryan Maskelyne | Papua New Guinea | 2:18.64 | |
| 48 | 1 | 4 | Liam Davis | Zimbabwe | 2:20.33 | NR |
| 49 | 2 | 8 | Josué Dominguez | Dominican Republic | 2:23.21 | |
| 50 | 2 | 0 | Tasi Limtiaco | Micronesia | 2:23.26 | |
| 51 | 1 | 5 | Arnoldo Herrera | Costa Rica | 2:25.70 | |
| 52 | 1 | 6 | Shuvam Shrestha | Nepal | 2:38.79 | |
| | 2 | 5 | Miguel Chávez | Mexico | DSQ | |
| | 5 | 1 | Caio Pumputis | Brazil | DSQ | |

=== Semifinals ===
The semifinals were held on 25 July at 20:44.

| Rank | Heat | Lane | Name | Nationality | Time | Notes |
|---|---|---|---|---|---|---|
| 1 | 2 | 4 | Matthew Wilson | Australia | 2:06.67 | Q, =WR |
| 2 | 1 | 4 | Anton Chupkov | Russia | 2:06.83 | Q |
| 3 | 1 | 6 | Andrew Wilson | United States | 2:07.86 | Q |
| 4 | 2 | 3 | Zac Stubblety-Cook | Australia | 2:07.95 | Q |
| 5 | 1 | 5 | Erik Persson | Sweden | 2:08.00 | Q |
| 6 | 2 | 2 | Ippei Watanabe | Japan | 2:08.04 | Q |
| 7 | 2 | 7 | Dmitriy Balandin | Kazakhstan | 2:08.19 | Q |
| 8 | 2 | 5 | Marco Koch | Germany | 2:08.28 | Q |
| 9 | 1 | 1 | Kazuki Kohinata | Japan | 2:08.42 | |
| 10 | 1 | 3 | Ross Murdoch | Great Britain | 2:08.51 | |
| 11 | 1 | 2 | Josh Prenot | United States | 2:08.77 | |
| 12 | 1 | 7 | Qin Haiyang | China | 2:09.11 | |
| 13 | 1 | 8 | Anton Sveinn McKee | Iceland | 2:10.68 | |
| 14 | 2 | 6 | Arno Kamminga | Netherlands | 2:08.48 | NR |
| 15 | 2 | 1 | James Wilby | Great Britain | 2:08.52 | |
| 16 | 2 | 8 | Mykyta Koptyelov | Ukraine | 2:09.96 | |

=== Final ===
The final was held on 26 July at 21:26.

| Rank | Lane | Name | Nationality | Time | Notes |
|---|---|---|---|---|---|
| 1st place, gold medalist(s) | 5 | Anton Chupkov | Russia | 2:06.12 | WR |
| 2nd place, silver medalist(s) | 4 | Matthew Wilson | Australia | 2:06.68 | |
| 3rd place, bronze medalist(s) | 7 | Ippei Watanabe | Japan | 2:06.73 | |
| 4 | 6 | Zac Stubblety-Cook | Australia | 2:07.36 | |
| 5 | 8 | Marco Koch | Germany | 2:07.60 | |
| 6 | 3 | Andrew Wilson | United States | 2:08.10 | |
| 7 | 1 | Dmitriy Balandin | Kazakhstan | 2:08.25 | |
| 8 | 2 | Erik Persson | Sweden | 2:08.39 | |
