= Swimming at the 2016 European Aquatics Championships – Men's 200 metre breaststroke =

Men's 200 metre breaststroke at the 2016 European Aquatics Championships
- Dates: 18 May
- Competitors: 45 from 28 nations
- Winning time: 2:08.33

Medalists
gold medal	Ross Murdoch	Great Britain
silver medal	Marco Koch	Germany
bronze medal	Luca Pizzini	Italy

The Men's 200 metre breaststroke competition of the 2016 European Aquatics Championships was held on 18 May 2016.

== Records ==
Prior to the competition, the existing world, European and championship records were as follows.

	Name	Nation	Time	Location	Date
World record	Akihiro Yamaguchi	Japan	2:07.01	Gifu	15 September 2012
European record	Dániel Gyurta	Hungary	2:07.23	Barcelona	2 August 2013
Championship record	Marco Koch	Germany	2:07.47	Berlin	21 August 2014

== Results ==
=== Heats ===
The heats were held on 18 May at 10:29.

Rank	Heat	Lane	Name	Nationality	Time	Notes
1	5	4	Marco Koch	Germany	2:11.29	Q
2	4	5	Matti Mattsson	Finland	2:11.78	Q
3	3	4	Ross Murdoch	Great Britain	2:11.87	Q
4	5	3	Erik Persson	Sweden	2:12.21	Q
5	3	5	Anton Sveinn McKee	Iceland	2:12.25	Q
6	4	3	Mikhail Dorinov	Russia	2:12.76	Q
7	5	5	Craig Benson	Great Britain	2:12.79	Q
8	4	4	Andrew Willis	Great Britain	2:12.88	
9	3	3	Luca Pizzini	Italy	2:12.92	Q
10	5	2	Dmytro Oseledets	Ukraine	2:13.33	Q
11	4	2	Max Pilger	Germany	2:13.64	Q
12	5	7	Yannick Käser	Switzerland	2:13.69	Q
13	4	0	Ronen Faor	Israel	2:13.72	Q
14	5	8	Johannes Dietrich	Austria	2:13.76	Q
15	5	6	Panagiotis Samilidis	Greece	2:13.82	Q
16	3	8	Dávid Horváth	Hungary	2:13.91	Q
17	4	6	Dimitrios Koulouris	Greece	2:14.19	Q
18	3	7	Luke Davies	Great Britain	2:14.30	
19	4	9	Christopher Rothbauer	Austria	2:14.57	
19	3	2	Laurent Carnol	Luxembourg	2:14.57	
21	4	7	Jonas Coreelman	Belgium	2:14.81	
22	2	4	Iliy Gladishev	Israel	2:14.91	
23	2	3	Martin Allikvee	Estonia	2:14.97	
24	3	6	Nicholas Quinn	Ireland	2:15.04	
25	3	0	Daniils Bobrovs	Latvia	2:15.12	
26	4	8	Valeriy Dymo	Ukraine	2:15.16	
27	1	6	Maksym Shemberev	Azerbaijan	2:16.19	
28	3	1	Patrik Schwarzenbach	Switzerland	2:16.34	
29	2	0	Luchezar Shumkov	Bulgaria	2:16.50	
30	2	9	Irakli Bolkvadze	Georgia	2:17.24	
31	2	8	Martin Liivamägi	Estonia	2:17.26	
32	2	6	Christoph Meier	Liechtenstein	2:17.29	
33	2	7	Marko Blaževski	Macedonia	2:17.33	
34	5	9	Andrius Šidlauskas	Lithuania	2:17.53	
34	3	9	Alpkan Örnek	Turkey	2:17.53	
36	2	2	Berkay Şendikici	Turkey	2:17.59	
37	2	5	Eitan Yudashkin	Israel	2:17.92	
38	5	0	Luca Pfyffer	Switzerland	2:18.20	
39	2	1	Demir Atasoy	Turkey	2:18.28	
40	4	1	Sverre Næss	Norway	2:19.24	
41	1	3	Tomás Veloso	Portugal	2:19.59	
42	5	1	Dan Sweeney	Ireland	2:21.16	
43	1	5	Silver Hein	Estonia	2:22.49	
44	1	7	Deni Baholli	Albania	2:27.60	
	1	2	Jørgen Braathen	Norway	DSQ	
	1	4	Gal Nevo	Israel	DNS	

=== Semifinals ===
The semifinals were held on 18 May at 18:22.

==== Semifinal 1 ====
Rank	Lane	Name	Nationality	Time	Notes
1	4	Matti Mattsson	Finland	2:10.10	Q
2	5	Erik Persson	Sweden	2:11.13	Q
3	1	Panagiotis Samilidis	Greece	2:11.22	Q
4	3	Mikhail Dorinov	Russia	2:11.25	Q
5	6	Luca Pizzini	Italy	2:11.54	Q
6	8	Dimitrios Koulouris	Greece	2:12.09	
7	2	Max Pilger	Germany	2:13.82	
8	7	Ronen Faor	Israel	2:14.84	

==== Semifinal 2 ====
Rank	Lane	Name	Nationality	Time	Notes
1	5	Ross Murdoch	Great Britain	2:09.72	Q
2	4	Marco Koch	Germany	2:09.82	Q
3	3	Anton Sveinn McKee	Iceland	2:10.91	Q
4	6	Craig Benson	Great Britain	2:11.93	
5	2	Dmytro Oseledets	Ukraine	2:11.97	
6	8	Dávid Horváth	Hungary	2:12.34	
7	1	Johannes Dietrich	Austria	2:14.13	
8	7	Yannick Käser	Switzerland	2:15.11	

=== Final ===
The final was held on 19 May at 18:46.

Rank	Lane	Name	Nationality	Time	Notes
1st place, gold medalist(s)	4	Ross Murdoch	Great Britain	2:08.33	
2nd place, silver medalist(s)	5	Marco Koch	Germany	2:08.40	
3rd place, bronze medalist(s)	8	Luca Pizzini	Italy	2:10.39	
4	2	Erik Persson	Sweden	2:10.50	
5	3	Matti Mattsson	Finland	2:10.69	
6	7	Panagiotis Samilidis	Greece	2:11.15	
7	1	Mikhail Dorinov	Russia	2:11.42	
8	6	Anton Sveinn McKee	Iceland	2:11.73	
