= Swimming at the 2020 European Aquatics Championships – Men's 200 metre breaststroke =

Men's 200 metre breaststroke at the 2020 European Aquatics Championships
- Venue: Danube Arena
- Dates: 19 May 2021 (heats and semifinals); 20 May 2021 (final)
- Competitors: 47 from 26 nations
- Winning time: 2:06.99

Medalists
gold medal	Anton Chupkov	Russia
silver medal	Arno Kamminga	Netherlands
bronze medal	Erik Persson	Sweden

The Men's 200 metre breaststroke competition of the 2020 European Aquatics Championships was held on 19 and 20 May 2021.

== Records ==
Prior to the competition, the existing world, European and championship records were as follows.

	Name	Nationality	Time	Location	Date
World record European record	Anton Chupkov	Russia	2:06.12	Gwangju	26 July 2019
Championship record	Anton Chupkov	Russia	2:06.80	Glasgow	6 August 2018

== Results ==
=== Heats ===
The heats were started on 19 May at 11:07.

Rank	Heat	Lane	Name	Nationality	Time	Notes
1	4	4	Arno Kamminga	Netherlands	2:07.39	Q
2	4	3	Matti Mattsson	Finland	2:08.43	Q, NR
3	4	5	Kirill Prigoda	Russia	2:09.21	Q
4	5	4	Anton Chupkov	Russia	2:09.44	Q
5	3	5	Ross Murdoch	Great Britain	2:09.60	Q
6	5	7	Andrius Šidlauskas	Lithuania	2:09.74	Q
7	5	3	Erik Persson	Sweden	2:09.77	Q
8	3	4	James Wilby	Great Britain	2:09.96	Q
9	3	2	Aleksandr Zhigalov	Russia	2:10.07	
10	4	7	Lyubomir Epitropov	Bulgaria	2:10.12	Q, NR
11	5	5	Marco Koch	Germany	2:10.40	Q
12	5	1	Giedrius Titenis	Lithuania	2:11.13	Q
13	3	3	Caspar Corbeau	Netherlands	2:11.19	Q
14	5	2	Christopher Rothbauer	Austria	2:11.78	Q
15	3	0	Valentin Bayer	Austria	2:11.99	Q
16	2	6	Adam Paulsson	Sweden	2:12.02	Q
17	5	6	Edoardo Giorgetti	Italy	2:12.23	Q
18	4	6	Berkay Ömer Öğretir	Turkey	2:12.32	
18	2	2	Matěj Zábojník	Czech Republic	2:12.32	NR
20	4	1	Ilya Shymanovich	Belarus	2:12.68	
21	3	6	Max Pilger	Germany	2:12.71	
22	3	7	Martin Allikvee	Estonia	2:12.80	
23	3	1	Andrea Castello	Italy	2:12.82	
23	5	8	Antoine Viquerat	France	2:12.82	
25	2	4	Filip Chrápavý	Czech Republic	2:13.22	
26	2	1	Tomáš Klobučník	Slovakia	2:13.29	
27	3	8	Demirkan Demir	Turkey	2:13.35	
28	4	8	Léon Marchand	France	2:13.40	
29	4	9	Danil Semyaninov	Russia	2:13.90	
30	2	5	Savvas Thomoglou	Greece	2:14.19	
31	1	3	Francisco Quintas	Portugal	2:14.26	
32	5	0	Máté Kutasi	Hungary	2:14.52	
33	2	3	Jolann Bovey	Switzerland	2:14.56	
34	4	0	Dávid Horváth	Hungary	2:14.67	
35	2	9	Christoffer Tofte Haarsaker	Norway	2:14.93	
36	5	9	Yannick Käser	Switzerland	2:15.13	
37	1	4	Daniils Bobrovs	Latvia	2:15.20	
38	1	6	Aleksas Savickas	Lithuania	2:15.35	
39	2	8	Dominik Márk Török	Hungary	2:15.95	
40	3	9	Joan Ballester	Spain	2:16.14	
41	2	0	Luka Mladenovic	Austria	2:16.87	
42	1	5	Volodymyr Lisovets	Ukraine	2:18.77	
43	2	7	Rostyslav Kryzhanivskyy	Ukraine	2:20.03	
44	1	2	Joonas Niine	Estonia	2:20.94	
45	1	1	Giacomo Casadei	San Marino	2:24.28	
46	1	7	André Klippenberg Grindheim	Norway	2:26.74	
47	1	8	Even Qarri	Albania	2:35.06	
	4	2	Darragh Greene	Ireland	Did not start	

=== Semifinals ===
The semifinals were held on 19 May at 18:54.

==== Semifinal 1 ====
Rank	Lane	Name	Nationality	Time	Notes
1	5	Anton Chupkov	Russia	2:07.94	Q
2	4	Matti Mattsson	Finland	2:08.26	Q, NR
3	6	James Wilby	Great Britain	2:09.90	q
4	7	Caspar Corbeau	Netherlands	2:09.97	q
5	2	Marco Koch	Germany	2:10.03	
6	3	Andrius Šidlauskas	Lithuania	2:10.08	
7	8	Edoardo Giorgetti	Italy	2:10.50	
8	1	Valentin Bayer	Austria	2:11.57	

==== Semifinal 2 ====
Rank	Lane	Name	Nationality	Time	Notes
1	6	Erik Persson	Sweden	2:07.85	Q, =NR
2	4	Arno Kamminga	Netherlands	2:08.31	Q
3	3	Ross Murdoch	Great Britain	2:08.83	q
4	5	Kirill Prigoda	Russia	2:08.84	q
5	7	Giedrius Titenis	Lithuania	2:10.91	
6	2	Lyubomir Epitropov	Bulgaria	2:11.19	
7	8	Adam Paulsson	Sweden	2:12.00	
8	1	Christopher Rothbauer	Austria	2:12.97	

=== Final ===
The final was held on 20 May at 19:09.

Rank	Lane	Name	Nationality	Time	Notes
1st place, gold medalist(s)	5	Anton Chupkov	Russia	2:06.99	
2nd place, silver medalist(s)	6	Arno Kamminga	Netherlands	2:07.35	
3rd place, bronze medalist(s)	4	Erik Persson	Sweden	2:07.66	NR
4	3	Matti Mattsson	Finland	2:08.48	
5	2	Ross Murdoch	Great Britain	2:08.58	
6	7	Kirill Prigoda	Russia	2:09.23	
7	8	Caspar Corbeau	Netherlands	2:09.73	
8	1	James Wilby	Great Britain	2:10.34	
