= Swimming at the 2020 Summer Olympics – Men's 200 metre breaststroke =

Men's 200 metre breaststroke at the Games of the XXXII Olympiad
- Venue: Tokyo Aquatics Centre
- Dates: 27 July 2021 (heats); 28 July 2021 (semifinals); 29 July 2021 (final)
- Competitors: 40 from 34 nations
- Winning time: 2:06.38 OR

Medalists
1st place, gold medalist(s)		Zac Stubblety-Cook	Australia
2nd place, silver medalist(s)		Arno Kamminga	Netherlands
3rd place, bronze medalist(s)		Matti Mattsson	Finland

The men's 200 metre breaststroke event at the 2020 Summer Olympics was held from 27 to 29 July 2021 at the Tokyo Aquatics Centre. It was the event's twenty-sixth consecutive appearance, having been held at every edition since 1908.

== Summary ==
Australia's Zac Stubblety-Cook came from behind to become his nation's first Olympic champion in this event since Ian O'Brien in 1964. Almost a body length behind Dutch early leader Arno Kamminga through the first 100 m of the race, Stubblety-Cook moved through the field in the penultimate lap. Still more than a second back at the final turn, Stubblety-Cook powered home to overtake the field and win gold in an Olympic record time of 2:06.38, only 0.1 of a second shy of his personal best time. Meanwhile, Kamminga shot out to an early lead, turning under world record pace at the 50 m mark. One and a quarter of a second ahead of world record pace at the 150 m mark, Kamminga faded over the closing stages of the race to take his second silver at these Games in 2:07.01.

Finland's Matti Mattson lowered his Finnish record by 1.1 seconds to claim a surprise bronze in 2:07.13. ROC's world record holder and defending bronze medallist Anton Chupkov (2:07.24) missed the podium by 11 one-hundredths to place fourth. The U.S.' Nic Fink (2:07.93) could not replicate his trials performance, falling to fifth. Great Britain's James Wilby was in second after the first lap but could not hang on with the leaders, placing sixth in 2:08.19. Japan's Ryuya Mura (2:08.42) and Sweden's Erik Persson (2:08.88) rounded out the field.

== Records ==
Prior to this competition, the existing world and Olympic records were as follows.

World record	Anton Chupkov (RUS)	2:06.12	Gwangju, South Korea	26 July 2019
Olympic record	Ippei Watanabe (JPN)	2:07.22	Rio de Janeiro, Brazil	9 August 2016

The following record was established during the competition:

Date	Event	Swimmer	Nation	Time	Record
July 29	Final	Zac Stubblety-Cook	Australia	2:06.38	OR

== Qualification ==
The Olympic Qualifying Time for the event is 2:10.35. Up to two swimmers per National Olympic Committee (NOC) can automatically qualify by swimming that time at an approved qualification event. The Olympic Selection Time is 2:14.26. Up to one swimmer per NOC meeting that time is eligible for selection, allocated by world ranking until the maximum quota for all swimming events is reached. NOCs without a male swimmer qualified in any event can also use their universality place.

== Competition format ==
The competition consists of three rounds: heats, semifinals, and a final. The swimmers with the best 16 times in the heats advance to the semifinals. The swimmers with the best eight times in the semifinals advance to the final. Swim-offs are used as necessary to break ties for advancement to the next round.

== Schedule ==
All times are Japan Standard Time (UTC+9)

Date	Time	Round
27 July	19:38	Heats
28 July	11:21	Semifinals
29 July	10:44	Final

== Results ==
=== Heats ===
The swimmers with the top 16 times, regardless of heat, advanced to the semifinals.

Rank	Heat	Lane	Swimmer	Nation	Time	Notes
1	4	4	Zac Stubblety-Cook	Australia	2:07.37	Q
1	4	5	Arno Kamminga	Netherlands	2:07.37	Q
3	3	2	Matti Mattsson	Finland	2:08.44	Q
4	5	3	Nic Fink	United States	2:08.48	Q
5	5	4	Anton Chupkov	ROC	2:08.54	Q
6	5	6	Erik Persson	Sweden	2:08.76	Q
7	5	2	Dmitriy Balandin	Kazakhstan	2:08.99	Q
8	4	3	Ryuya Mura	Japan	2:09.00	Q
9	4	2	Kirill Prigoda	ROC	2:09.21	Q
10	5	5	Matthew Wilson	Australia	2:09.29	Q
11	3	4	Shoma Sato	Japan	2:09.43	Q
12	3	8	Antoine Viquerat	France	2:09.54	Q
13	5	1	Andrius Šidlauskas	Lithuania	2:09.56	Q
14	4	8	Lyubomir Epitropov	Bulgaria	2:09.68	Q, NR
15	3	5	James Wilby	Great Britain	2:09.70	Q
16	3	6	Ross Murdoch	Great Britain	2:09.95	Q
17	4	6	Andrew Wilson	United States	2:09.97	
18	2	3	Denis Petrashov	Kyrgyzstan	2:10.07	NR
19	3	7	Cho Sung-jae	South Korea	2:10.17	
20	3	3	Marco Koch	Germany	2:10.18	
21	4	7	Caspar Corbeau	Netherlands	2:10.21	
22	4	1	Berkay Öğretir	Turkey	2:10.73	
23	5	8	Darragh Greene	Ireland	2:11.09	
24	2	4	Anton McKee	Iceland	2:11.64	
25	2	5	Martin Allikvee	Estonia	2:12.60	
26	2	2	Amro Al-Wir	Jordan	2:12.61	
27	2	7	Ron Polonsky	Israel	2:12.71	
28	3	1	Christopher Rothbauer	Austria	2:13.19	
29	1	2	Tyler Christianson	Panama	2:13.41	NR
30	2	6	Jorge Murillo	Colombia	2:13.46	
31	2	8	Daniils Bobrovs	Latvia	2:14.25	
32	1	6	Ryan Maskelyne	Papua New Guinea	2:15.33	NR
33	2	1	Adriel Sanes	Virgin Islands	2:16.87	
34	1	3	Josué Domínguez	Dominican Republic	2:17.34	
35	1	4	Taichi Vakasama	Fiji	2:17.35	
36	1	5	Izaak Bastian	Bahamas	2:17.40	
37	1	7	Julio Horrego	Honduras	2:17.51	
38	1	1	Arnoldo Herrera	Costa Rica	2:20.09	
39	1	8	Abdulaziz Al-Obaidly	Qatar	2:23.22	
	5	7	Qin Haiyang	China	DSQ	

=== Semifinals ===
The swimmers with the best 8 times, regardless of heat, advanced to the final.

Rank	Heat	Lane	Swimmer	Nation	Time	Notes
1	2	4	Zac Stubblety-Cook	Australia	2:07.35	Q
2	2	8	James Wilby	Great Britain	2:07.91	Q
3	1	4	Arno Kamminga	Netherlands	2:07.99	Q
4	1	5	Nic Fink	United States	2:08.00	Q
5	2	5	Matti Mattsson	Finland	2:08.22	Q, NR
6	1	6	Ryuya Mura	Japan	2:08.27	Q
7	2	3	Anton Chupkov	ROC	2:08.54	Q
8	1	3	Erik Persson	Sweden	2:08.76	Q
9	2	2	Kirill Prigoda	ROC	2:08.88	
10	2	7	Shoma Sato	Japan	2:09.04	
11	2	6	Dmitriy Balandin	Kazakhstan	2:09.22	
12	1	7	Antoine Viquerat	France	2:09.97	
12	1	8	Ross Murdoch	Great Britain	2:09.97	
14	1	2	Matthew Wilson	Australia	2:10.10	
15	1	1	Lyubomir Epitropov	Bulgaria	2:10.33	
16	2	1	Andrius Šidlauskas	Lithuania	2:10.69	

=== Final ===
Rank	Lane	Swimmer	Nation	Time	Notes
1st place, gold medalist(s)	4	Zac Stubblety-Cook	Australia	2:06.38	OR
2nd place, silver medalist(s)	3	Arno Kamminga	Netherlands	2:07.01	
3rd place, bronze medalist(s)	2	Matti Mattsson	Finland	2:07.13	NR
4	1	Anton Chupkov	ROC	2:07.24	
5	6	Nic Fink	United States	2:07.93	
6	5	James Wilby	Great Britain	2:08.19	
7	7	Ryuya Mura	Japan	2:08.42	
8	8	Erik Persson	Sweden	2:08.88	
