= Swimming at the 2014 European Aquatics Championships – Men's 200 metre breaststroke =

Men's 200 metre breaststroke at the Swimming at the 2014 European Aquatics Championships
- Dates: 20–21 August
- Competitors: 38 from 25 nations
- Winning time: 2:07.47

Medalists
gold medal	Marco Koch	Germany
silver medal	Ross Murdoch	Great Britain
bronze medal	Giedrius Titenis	Lithuania

The Men's 200 metre breaststroke competition of the 2014 European Aquatics Championships was held on 20–21 August.

== Records ==
Prior to the competition, the existing world, European and championship records were as follows.

	Name	Nation	Time	Location	Date
World record	Akihiro Yamaguchi	Japan	2:07.01	Gifu	15 September 2012
European record	Dániel Gyurta	Hungary	2:07.23	Barcelona	2 August 2013
Championship record	Dániel Gyurta	Hungary	2:08.60	Debrecen	24 May 2012

== Results ==
=== Heats ===
The heats were held at 10:01.

Rank	Heat	Lane	Name	Nationality	Time	Notes
1	3	4	Marco Koch	Germany	2:09.11	Q
2	4	5	Andrew Willis	Great Britain	2:09.91	Q
3	2	2	Ilya Khomenko	Russia	2:10.78	Q
4	4	4	Ross Murdoch	Great Britain	2:11.15	Q
5	2	5	Giedrius Titenis	Lithuania	2:11.83	Q
6	4	7	Kirill Prigoda	Russia	2:11.92	Q
7	2	3	Laurent Carnol	Luxembourg	2:12.34	Q
8	3	5	Adam Peaty	Great Britain	2:12.40	
9	3	3	Luca Pizzini	Italy	2:12.44	Q
10	2	6	Grigory Falko	Russia	2:12.47	
11	3	7	Mikolaj Machnik	Poland	2:12.56	Q
12	2	4	Matti Mattsson	Finland	2:12.75	Q
13	4	3	Alexander Palatov	Russia	2:13.14	
14	2	7	Dmytro Oseledets	Ukraine	2:13.35	Q
15	3	6	Thomas Dahlia	France	2:13.59	Q
16	3	0	Yannick Käser	Switzerland	2:13.87	Q
17	4	2	Erik Persson	Sweden	2:13.90	Q
18	4	1	Melquíades Álvarez	Spain	2:14.10	Q
19	3	2	Quentin Coton	France	2:14.21	Q
20	4	8	Igor Kozlovskij	Lithuania	2:14.36	
21	2	9	Jeremy Desplanches	Switzerland	2:14.47	
22	4	0	Nicholas Quinn	Ireland	2:14.82	
23	1	3	Christoph Meier	Liechtenstein	2:14.97	
24	3	8	Valeriy Dymo	Ukraine	2:15.79	
25	1	7	Sverre Næss	Norway	2:15.82	
26	1	1	Bogdan Knežević	Serbia	2:16.03	NR
27	3	1	Carlos Almeida	Portugal	2:16.10	
28	1	8	Martin Allikvee	Estonia	2:16.22	
29	3	9	Patrik Schwarzenbach	Switzerland	2:16.38	
30	1	5	Martti Aljand	Estonia	2:16.71	
31	1	6	Irakli Bolkvadze	Georgia	2:16.84	
32	4	9	Gal Nevo	Israel	2:16.89	
33	4	6	Tomáš Klobučník	Slovakia	2:17.25	
34	2	0	Antonin Svěcený	Czech Republic	2:17.59	
35	1	4	Jakub Maly	Austria	2:18.35	
36	1	2	Alpkan Örnek	Turkey	2:18.55	
37	2	8	Maksym Shemberev	Ukraine	2:19.40	
—	2	1	Dan Sweeney	Ireland		DSQ

=== Semifinals ===
The semifinals were held at 18:25.

==== Semifinal 1 ====
Rank	Lane	Name	Nationality	Time	Notes
1	5	Ross Murdoch	Great Britain	2:08.65	Q
2	4	Andrew Willis	Great Britain	2:08.93	Q
3	6	Luca Pizzini	Italy	2:10.90	Q
4	3	Kirill Prigoda	Russia	2:11.26	Q
5	2	Matti Mattsson	Finland	2:12.93	
6	1	Erik Persson	Sweden	2:13.09	
7	7	Thomas Dahlia	France	2:13.29	
8	8	Quentin Coton	France	2:13.61	

==== Semifinal 2 ====
Rank	Lane	Name	Nationality	Time	Notes
1	4	Marco Koch	Germany	2:08.83	Q
2	5	Ilya Khomenko	Russia	2:10.00	Q
3	3	Giedrius Titenis	Lithuania	2:10.05	Q
4	6	Laurent Carnol	Luxembourg	2:11.89	Q
5	7	Dmytro Oseledets	Ukraine	2:12.27	
6	2	Mikolaj Machnik	Poland	2:12.98	
7	8	Melquíades Álvarez	Spain	2:14.62	
8	1	Yannick Käser	Switzerland	2:14.67	

=== Final ===
The final was held at 18:46.

Rank	Lane	Name	Nationality	Time	Notes
1st place, gold medalist(s)	5	Marco Koch	Germany	2:07.47	CR
2nd place, silver medalist(s)	4	Ross Murdoch	Great Britain	2:07.77	
3rd place, bronze medalist(s)	2	Giedrius Titenis	Lithuania	2:08.93	
4	3	Andrew Willis	Great Britain	2:09.19	
5	6	Ilya Khomenko	Russia	2:10.36	
6	7	Luca Pizzini	Italy	2:10.93	
7	8	Laurent Carnol	Luxembourg	2:12.50	
8	1	Kirill Prigoda	Russia	2:12.96	
