= Swimming at the 2022 European Aquatics Championships – Men's 200 metre breaststroke =

Men's 200 metre breaststroke at the 2022 European Aquatics Championships
- Venue: Foro Italico
- Dates: 13 August (heats and semifinals); 14 August (final)
- Competitors: 30 from 20 nations
- Winning time: 2:08.96

Medalists
gold medal	James Wilby	Great Britain
silver medal	Matti Mattsson	Finland
bronze medal	Luca Pizzini	Italy

The Men's 200 metre breaststroke competition of the 2022 European Aquatics Championships was held on 13 and 14 August 2022.

== Records ==
Prior to the competition, the existing world, European and championship records were as follows.

	Name	Nation	Time	Location	Date
World record	Zac Stubblety-Cook	Australia	2:05.95	Adelaide	19 May 2022
European record	Anton Chupkov	Russia	2:06.12	Gwangju	26 July 2019
Championship record	Anton Chupkov	Russia	2:06.80	Glasgow	6 August 2018

== Results ==
=== Heats ===
The heats were started on 13 August at 09:42.

Rank	Heat	Lane	Name	Nationality	Time	Notes
1	4	6	Matěj Zábojník	Czech Republic	2:11.16	Q
2	3	4	Matti Mattsson	Finland	2:11.51	Q
3	4	5	Anton Sveinn McKee	Iceland	2:11.82	Q
4	3	8	Gabriel Lopes	Portugal	2:11.92	Q, NR
5	3	5	Andrius Šidlauskas	Lithuania	2:12.47	Q
6	3	3	Dawid Wiekiera	Poland	2:12.50	Q
7	4	2	Darragh Greene	Ireland	2:12.53	Q
8	4	3	Lyubomir Epitropov	Bulgaria	2:12.56	Q
9	3	1	Maksym Ovchinnikov	Ukraine	2:12.69	Q
10	2	3	Luca Pizzini	Italy	2:12.72	Q
11	2	4	James Wilby	Great Britain	2:12.87	Q
12	2	2	Greg Butler	Great Britain	2:13.08	Q
13	2	5	Antoine Viquerat	France	2:13.35	Q
14	4	9	David Verrasztó	Hungary	2:13.81	Q
15	2	6	Andrea Castello	Italy	2:13.88	Q
16	4	8	Gábor Zombori	Hungary	2:13.93	Q
17	4	7	Daniel Raisanen	Sweden	2:14.48	
18	3	2	Eoin Corby	Ireland	2:14.75	
19	2	8	Christoffer Haarsaker	Norway	2:14.95	
20	3	0	Daniils Bobrovs	Latvia	2:14.96	
21	2	0	David Kyzymenko	Ukraine	2:15.40	
22	2	1	Aleksas Savickas	Lithuania	2:15.63	
23	4	1	Luka Mladenovic	Austria	2:15.98	
24	4	0	Maksym Tkachuk	Ukraine	2:16.42	
25	2	9	William Lulek	Sweden	2:17.89	
26	1	4	Denis Svet	Moldova	2:18.46	
27	3	9	Constantin Malachi	Romania	2:18.51	
28	1	3	Even Qarri	Albania	2:34.53	
	3	6	Christopher Rothbauer	Austria	Disqualified	
	3	7	Savvas Thomoglou	Greece	Disqualified	
	1	5	Giacomo Casadei	San Marino	Did not start	
	2	7	Carles Coll	Spain	Did not start	
	4	4	Arno Kamminga	Netherlands	Did not start	

=== Semifinals ===
The semifinals were started on 13 August at 19:04.

Rank	Heat	Lane	Name	Nationality	Time	Notes
1	1	4	Matti Mattsson	Finland	2:09.88	Q
2	1	2	Luca Pizzini	Italy	2:10.48	Q
3	2	3	Andrius Šidlauskas	Lithuania	2:10.59	Q
4	1	3	Dawid Wiekiera	Poland	2:10.60	q
5	2	1	Antoine Viquerat	France	2:11.14	Q
6	2	5	Anton Sveinn McKee	Iceland	2:11.47	q
7	2	4	Matěj Zábojník	Czech Republic	2:11.48	q
8	2	7	James Wilby	Great Britain	2:11.73	Q
9	1	6	Lyubomir Epitropov	Bulgaria	2:12.08	
10	1	5	Gabriel Lopes	Portugal	2:12.37	
11	2	2	Maksym Ovchinnikov	Ukraine	2:12.62	
12	1	1	David Verrasztó	Hungary	2:12.64	
13	2	6	Darragh Greene	Ireland	2:12.73	
14	1	7	Greg Butler	Great Britain	2:13.21	
15	1	8	Gábor Zombori	Hungary	2:13.47	
16	2	8	Andrea Castello	Italy	2:13.57	

=== Final ===
The final was started on 14 August at 19:08.

Rank	Lane	Name	Nationality	Time	Notes
1st place, gold medalist(s)	8	James Wilby	Great Britain	2:08.96	
2nd place, silver medalist(s)	4	Matti Mattsson	Finland	2:09.40	
3rd place, bronze medalist(s)	5	Luca Pizzini	Italy	2:09.97	
4	6	Dawid Wiekiera	Poland	2:10.27	
5	3	Andrius Šidlauskas	Lithuania	2:10.45	
6	7	Anton Sveinn McKee	Iceland	2:10.96	
7	2	Antoine Viquerat	France	2:11.14	
8	1	Matěj Zábojník	Czech Republic	2:12.27	
