= Swimming at the 2015 European Games – Men's 200 metre breaststroke =

Men's 200 metre breaststroke at the 2015 European Games
- Venue: Aquatic Palace
- Dates: 23–24 June
- Competitors: 33 from 22 nations
- Winning time: 2:10.85

Medalists
gold medal	Anton Chupkov	Russia
silver medal	Kirill Mordashev	Russia
bronze medal	Luke Davies	Great Britain

The men's 200 metre breaststroke event at the 2015 European Games in Baku took place on 23 and 24 June at the Aquatic Palace.

== Results ==
=== Heats ===
The heats were started on 23 June at 11:20.

Rank	Heat	Lane	Name	Nationality	Time	Notes
1	4	4	Anton Chupkov	Russia	2:11.52	Q, GR
2	4	5	Luke Davies	Great Britain	2:12.75	Q
3	2	4	Kirill Mordashev	Russia	2:13.20	Q
4	3	4	Arkadii Grigorev	Russia	2:14.29	
5	4	3	Egor Suchkov	Russia	2:14.58	
6	3	5	Charlie Attwood	Great Britain	2:14.78	Q
7	2	5	Basten Caerts	Belgium	2:15.47	Q
8	3	2	Iliya Gladishev	Israel	2:16.78	Q
9	3	3	Jacques Läuffer	Switzerland	2:17.00	Q
10	2	3	Konstantinos Meretsolias	Greece	2:17.06	Q
11	3	6	Andrius Šidlauskas	Lithuania	2:17.37	Q
12	4	6	Daniils Bobrovs	Latvia	2:17.47	Q
13	4	2	Jacek Arentewicz	Poland	2:17.77	Q
14	3	7	Christopher Rothbauer	Austria	2:18.12	Q
15	4	7	Paulius Grigaliūnas	Lithuania	2:18.20	Q
16	2	2	Máté Kutasi	Hungary	2:19.23	Q
17	4	8	Anton Jeltyakov	Azerbaijan	2:19.38	Q
18	2	7	Dominik Hitzinger	Austria	2:19.72	QSO
18	3	0	Richárd Miksi	Hungary	2:19.72	QSO
20	2	6	Leo Schmidt	Germany	2:20.05	
21	3	1	Anton Prakopau	Belarus	2:20.09	
22	4	9	Tobias Bjerg	Denmark	2:20.12	
23	4	1	Nico Perner	Germany	2:20.14	
24	3	8	Edvinas Mažintas	Lithuania	2:21.19	
25	2	1	Mads Henry Steinland	Norway	2:21.87	
26	2	0	Igor Proskura	Ukraine	2:21.99	
27	4	0	Federico Poggio	Italy	2:23.33	
28	3	9	Teodor Widerberg	Sweden	2:23.75	
29	2	9	Matthew Tsenkov	Bulgaria	2:25.69	
30	1	4	Andrew Moore	Ireland	2:26.16	
31	1	3	Yevgen Kurkin	Ukraine	2:26.39	
32	2	8	Nico Spahn	Switzerland	2:26.99	
33	1	5	Maksim Akavantsev	Estonia	2:30.07	

=== Swim-off ===
The swim-off was held on 23 June at 12:36.

Rank	Lane	Name	Nationality	Time	Notes
1	5	Richárd Miksi	Hungary	2:20.47	Q
2	4	Dominik Hitzinger	Austria	2:21.38	

=== Semifinals ===
The semifinals were started on 23 June at 17:52.

==== Semifinal 1 ====
Rank	Lane	Name	Nationality	Time	Notes
1	4	Luke Davies	Great Britain	2:13.45	Q
2	5	Charlie Attwood	Great Britain	2:14.75	Q
3	6	Konstantinos Meretsolias	Greece	2:15.24	q
4	2	Daniils Bobrovs	Latvia	2:16.00	q
5	1	Máté Kutasi	Hungary	2:17.56	
6	7	Christopher Rothbauer	Austria	2:19.43	
7	8	Richárd Miksi	Hungary	2:19.96	
	3	Iliya Gladishev	Israel	DSQ	

==== Semifinal 2 ====
Rank	Lane	Name	Nationality	Time	Notes
1	4	Anton Chupkov	Russia	2:10.69	Q, GR
2	5	Kirill Mordashev	Russia	2:13.29	Q
3	7	Jacek Arentewicz	Poland	2:13.62	q
4	3	Basten Caerts	Belgium	2:13.76	q
5	1	Paulius Grigaliūnas	Lithuania	2:16.39	
6	2	Andrius Šidlauskas	Lithuania	2:16.44	
7	6	Jacques Läuffer	Switzerland	2:16.89	
8	8	Anton Jeltyakov	Azerbaijan	2:18.79	

=== Final ===
The final was held on 24 June at 18:27.

Rank	Lane	Name	Nationality	Time	Notes
1st place, gold medalist(s)	4	Anton Chupkov	Russia	2:10.85	
2nd place, silver medalist(s)	5	Kirill Mordashev	Russia	2:12.94	
3rd place, bronze medalist(s)	3	Luke Davies	Great Britain	2:13.45	
4	7	Charlie Attwood	Great Britain	2:13.62	
5	6	Jacek Arentewicz	Poland	2:14.12	
6	2	Basten Caerts	Belgium	2:14.20	
7	8	Daniils Bobrovs	Latvia	2:14.29	
8	1	Konstantinos Meretsolias	Greece	2:16.36	
