= Swimming at the 2015 European Games – Men's 100 metre breaststroke =

Men's 100 metre breaststroke at the 2015 European Games
- Venue: Aquatic Palace
- Dates: 26–27 June
- Competitors: 41 from 25 nations
- Winning time: 1:00.65

Medalists
gold medal	Anton Chupkov	Russia
silver medal	Andrius Šidlauskas	Lithuania
bronze medal	Charlie Attwood	Great Britain

The men's 100 metre breaststroke event at the 2015 European Games in Baku took place on 26 and 27 June at the Aquatic Palace.

== Results ==
=== Heats ===
The heats were started on 26 June at 11:06.

Rank	Heat	Lane	Name	Nationality	Time	Notes
1	5	4	Anton Chupkov	Russia	1:00.94	Q, GR
2	4	5	Charlie Attwood	Great Britain	1:01.93	Q
3	4	4	Andrius Šidlauskas	Lithuania	1:02.06	Q
4	3	6	Tobias Bjerg	Denmark	1:02.27	Q
5	3	5	Egor Suchkov	Russia	1:02.31	Q
6	4	3	Basten Caerts	Belgium	1:02.68	Q
7	3	3	Arkadii Grigorev	Russia	1:02.69	
8	5	5	Alex Baldisseri	Italy	1:02.95	Q
9	4	7	Iliya Gladishev	Israel	1:03.09	Q
10	3	2	Kirill Mordashev	Russia	1:03.13	
11	5	6	Luke Davies	Great Britain	1:03.17	Q
12	5	1	Christopher Rothbauer	Austria	1:03.25	Q
13	3	7	Jacek Arentewicz	Poland	1:03.53	Q
14	5	2	Paulius Grigaliūnas	Lithuania	1:03.57	Q
14	5	9	Philip Greve	Denmark	1:03.57	Q
16	4	2	Daniils Bobrovs	Latvia	1:03.71	Q
17	2	5	Anton Jeltyakov	Azerbaijan	1:03.83	Q
18	5	7	Leo Schmidt	Germany	1:03.95	Q
19	4	1	Georgios Fragkoudakis	Greece	1:04.15	
20	3	1	Konstantinos Meretsolias	Greece	1:04.30	
21	4	8	Amir Haviv	Israel	1:04.33	
22	4	6	Anton Prakopau	Belarus	1:04.55	
23	3	9	Richárd Miksi	Hungary	1:04.68	
24	2	1	Matthew Tsenkov	Bulgaria	1:04.69	
25	1	3	Yevgen Kurkin	Ukraine	1:04.77	
26	3	8	Pau Solà	Spain	1:04.79	
27	2	8	Silver Hein	Estonia	1:04.92	
28	4	9	Mads Henry Steinland	Norway	1:04.94	
29	2	6	Teodor Widerberg	Sweden	1:05.11	
30	2	4	Peter Ďurišin	Slovakia	1:05.15	
31	2	3	Dominik Hitzinger	Austria	1:05.24	
31	3	0	Edvinas Mažintas	Lithuania	1:05.24	
33	2	7	Nico Perner	Germany	1:05.32	
34	4	0	Igor Proskura	Ukraine	1:06.03	
35	1	5	Jakub Březina	Czech Republic	1:07.12	
36	1	4	Andrew Moore	Ireland	1:07.51	
37	2	0	Karel Seli	Estonia	1:07.77	
	2	2	Máté Kutasi	Hungary	DSQ	
	5	0	Nico Spahn	Switzerland	DSQ	
	5	3	Federico Poggio	Italy	DSQ	
	5	8	Jacques Läuffer	Switzerland	DSQ	
	3	4	Nikola Obrovac	Croatia	DNS	

=== Semifinals ===
The semifinals were started on 26 June at 18:41.

==== Semifinal 1 ====
Rank	Lane	Name	Nationality	Time	Notes
1	4	Charlie Attwood	Great Britain	1:01.77	Q
2	3	Basten Caerts	Belgium	1:02.34	Q
3	5	Tobias Bjerg	Denmark	1:02.39	q
4	1	Daniils Bobrovs	Latvia	1:03.22	
5	2	Christopher Rothbauer	Austria	1:03.42	
6	7	Paulius Grigaliūnas	Lithuania	1:03.46	
7	8	Leo Schmidt	Germany	1:04.10	
	6	Iliya Gladishev	Israel	DSQ	

==== Semifinal 2 ====
Rank	Lane	Name	Nationality	Time	Notes
1	4	Anton Chupkov	Russia	1:00.95	Q
2	5	Andrius Šidlauskas	Lithuania	1:00.99	Q
3	3	Egor Suchkov	Russia	1:02.15	q
4	7	Jacek Arentewicz	Poland	1:02.75	q
5	6	Alex Baldisseri	Italy	1:02.98	q
6	2	Luke Davies	Great Britain	1:03.21	
7	1	Philip Greve	Denmark	1:03.34	
8	8	Anton Jeltyakov	Azerbaijan	1:03.79	

=== Final ===
The final was held on 27 June at 17:56.

Rank	Lane	Name	Nationality	Time	Notes
1st place, gold medalist(s)	4	Anton Chupkov	Russia	1:00.65	GR, WJ
2nd place, silver medalist(s)	5	Andrius Šidlauskas	Lithuania	1:01.42	
3rd place, bronze medalist(s)	3	Charlie Attwood	Great Britain	1:01.71	
4	7	Tobias Bjerg	Denmark	1:02.21	
5	6	Egor Suchkov	Russia	1:02.26	
6	2	Basten Caerts	Belgium	1:02.28	
7	1	Jacek Arentewicz	Poland	1:02.57	
8	8	Alex Baldisseri	Italy	1:02.99	
