= Swimming at the 2024 European Aquatics Championships – Men's 200 metre breaststroke =

Men's 200 metre breaststroke at the 2024 European Aquatics Championships
- Venue: Sports Centre Milan Gale Muškatirović
- Dates: 19 June (heats and semifinals); 20 June (final)
- Competitors: 28 from 21 nations
- Winning time: 2:09.45

Medalists
gold medal	Lyubomir Epitropov	Bulgaria
gold medal	Erik Persson	Sweden
bronze medal	Jan Kałusowski	Poland

The Men's 200 metre breaststroke competition of the 2024 European Aquatics Championships was held on 19 and 20 June 2024.

== Records ==
Prior to the competition, the existing world, European and championship records were as follows.

	Name	Nationality	Time	Location	Date
World record	Qin Haiyang	China	2:05.48	Fukuoka	28 July 2023
European record	Anton Chupkov	Russia	2:06.12	Gwangju	26 July 2019
Championship record	Anton Chupkov	Russia	2:06.80	Glasgow	6 August 2018

== Results ==
=== Heats ===
The heats were started on 19 June at 10:10.
Qualification Rules: The 16 fastest from the heats qualify to the semifinals.

Rank	Heat	Lane	Name	Nationality	Time	Notes
1	3	4	Anton McKee	Iceland	2:11.96	Q
2	2	6	Jérémy Desplanches	Switzerland	2:12.32	Q
3	2	5	Jan Kałusowski	Poland	2:12.34	Q
4	2	4	Erik Persson	Sweden	2:12.62	Q
5	1	3	Darragh Greene	Ireland	2:12.87	Q
5	1	4	Lyubomir Epitropov	Bulgaria	2:12.87	Q
5	3	5	Maksym Ovchinnikov	Ukraine	2:12.87	Q
8	2	3	Christopher Rothbauer	Austria	2:13.21	Q
9	3	2	Daniils Bobrovs	Latvia	2:13.34	Q
10	1	5	Eoin Corby	Ireland	2:13.74	Q
11	3	3	Andrius Šidlauskas	Lithuania	2:14.00	Q
12	1	6	Vojtech Netrh	Czech Republic	2:14.17	Q
13	2	1	Denis Svet	Moldova	2:15.13	Q
14	1	2	Jonathan Itzhaki	Israel	2:15.46	Q
15	2	2	Finn Wendland	Germany	2:15.81	Q
15	2	7	Constantin Malachi	Moldova	2:15.81	Q
17	3	6	Uiseann Cooke	Ireland	2:16.15	
18	1	7	Finn Kemp	Luxembourg	2:16.67	
19	3	8	João Reisen	Luxembourg	2:16.97	
20	3	7	Jakub Bursa	Czech Republic	2:17.95	
21	3	1	Kristaps Mikelsons	Latvia	2:19.26	
22	1	1	Marko Priednieks	Latvia	2:19.41	
23	3	0	Jami Ihalainen	Finland	2:20.45	
24	1	0	Matīss Kaktiņš	Latvia	2:21.84	
25	1	8	Jonas Gaur	Denmark	2:22.38	
26	3	9	Juraj Barcot	Croatia	2:22.84	
27	2	8	Matija Rađenović	Serbia	2:24.91	
28	2	0	Andrej Stojanovski	North Macedonia	2:26.14	

=== Semifinals ===
The semifinal were started on 19 June at 19:34.
Qualification Rules: The first 2 competitors of each semifinal and the remaining fastest (up to a total of 8 qualified competitors) from the semifinals advance to the final.

Rank	Heat	Lane	Name	Nationality	Time	Notes
1	2	4	Anton McKee	Iceland	2:10.14	Q
2	1	4	Jan Kałusowski	Poland	2:10.35	Q
3	2	3	Lyubomir Epitropov	Bulgaria	2:10.38	Q
4	2	5	Erik Persson	Sweden	2:10.72	Q
5	2	2	Eoin Corby	Ireland	2:11.62	Q
6	1	3	Maksym Ovchinnikov	Ukraine	2:12.00	Q
7	2	6	Christopher Rothbauer	Austria	2:12.79	Q
8	1	2	Andrius Šidlauskas	Lithuania	2:13.23	Q
9	2	7	Vojtech Netrh	Czech Republic	2:13.41	
10	1	5	Darragh Greene	Ireland	2:13.42	
11	1	6	Daniils Bobrovs	Latvia	2:13.53	
12	2	1	Finn Wendland	Germany	2:14.85	
13	1	7	Denis Svet	Moldova	2:15.23	
14	1	8	João Reisen	Luxembourg	2:15.45	
15	2	8	Finn Kemp	Luxembourg	2:16.62	
16	1	1	Constantin Malachi	Moldova	2:18.74	

=== Final ===
The final was held on 20 June at 19:31.

Rank	Lane	Name	Nationality	Time	Notes
1st place, gold medalist(s)	3	Lyubomir Epitropov	Bulgaria	2:09.45	NR
1st place, gold medalist(s)	6	Erik Persson	Sweden	2:09.45	
3rd place, bronze medalist(s)	5	Jan Kałusowski	Poland	2:10.20	
4	4	Anton McKee	Iceland	2:10.28	
5	7	Maksym Ovchinnikov	Ukraine	2:11.84	
6	8	Andrius Šidlauskas	Lithuania	2:12.36	
7	2	Eoin Corby	Ireland	2:12.71	
8	1	Christopher Rothbauer	Austria	2:13.07	
