= Swimming at the 2015 European Games – Men's 50 metre breaststroke =

Men's 50 metre breaststroke at the 2015 European Games
- Venue: Aquatic Palace
- Dates: 25 June
- Competitors: 45 from 27 nations
- Winning time: 27.81

Medalists
gold medal	Andrius Šidlauskas	Lithuania
silver medal	Nikola Obrovac	Croatia
bronze medal	Tobias Bjerg	Denmark

The men's 50 metre breaststroke event at the 2015 European Games in Baku took place on 25 June at the Aquatic Palace.

== Results ==
=== Heats ===
The heats were started at 09:40.

Rank	Heat	Lane	Name	Nationality	Time	Notes
1	5	3	Philip Greve	Denmark	28.00	Q, GR
2	3	4	Andrius Šidlauskas	Lithuania	28.05	Q
3	4	6	Emre Sakçı	Turkey	28.11	Q
4	5	4	Nikola Obrovac	Croatia	28.17	Q
5	5	2	Tobias Bjerg	Denmark	28.30	Q
6	4	3	Egor Suchkov	Russia	28.43	Q
7	4	5	Anton Chupkov	Russia	28.44	Q
8	5	6	Charlie Attwood	Great Britain	28.62	Q
9	1	2	Yevgen Kurkin	Ukraine	28.65	Q
10	5	7	Federico Poggio	Italy	28.82	Q
11	3	2	Anton Prakopau	Belarus	28.84	Q
12	4	7	Arkadii Grigorev	Russia	28.85	
13	5	5	Deniss Komars	Latvia	28.89	Q
14	4	2	Amir Haviv	Israel	29.02	Q
15	3	3	Pau Solà	Spain	29.05	Q
16	5	9	Jakub Březina	Czech Republic	29.16	Q
17	3	1	Leo Schmidt	Germany	29.18	Q
18	4	8	Peter Ďurišin	Slovakia	29.20	
19	4	4	Anton Jeltyakov	Azerbaijan	29.21	
20	3	6	Alex Baldisseri	Italy	29.29	
21	3	7	Paulius Grigaliūnas	Lithuania	29.31	
21	5	8	Jacek Arentewicz	Poland	29.31	
23	3	5	Werner-Erich Kulla	Estonia	29.32	
23	5	1	Kirill Mordashev	Russia	29.32	
25	4	1	Georgios Fragkoudakis	Greece	29.34	
26	4	0	Christopher Rothbauer	Austria	29.44	
27	3	9	Teodor Widerberg	Sweden	29.52	
28	4	9	Nico Perner	Germany	29.57	
29	3	8	Luke Davies	Great Britain	29.59	
30	5	0	Mads Henry Steinland	Norway	29.64	
31	2	4	Matthew Tsenkov	Bulgaria	29.65	
32	3	0	Nico Spahn	Switzerland	29.66	
33	2	6	Edvinas Mažintas	Lithuania	30.02	
34	2	0	Sigurd Holten Bøen	Norway	30.04	
35	2	3	Alan Corby	Ireland	30.32	
36	2	2	Igor Proskura	Ukraine	30.33	
37	2	5	Karel Seli	Estonia	30.34	
38	1	3	Kirill Baron	Israel	30.42	
39	2	1	Thomas Fannon	Great Britain	30.58	
40	2	8	Thomas Maurer	Switzerland	31.03	
41	2	7	Richárd Miksi	Hungary	31.10	
42	1	4	Andrew Moore	Ireland	31.17	
43	2	9	Máté Kutasi	Hungary	31.38	
44	1	6	Eric Fernández	Andorra	32.62	
45	1	5	Murat Ayhan	Azerbaijan	34.02	

=== Semifinals ===
The semifinals were started at 17:30.

==== Semifinal 1 ====
Rank	Lane	Name	Nationality	Time	Notes
1	4	Andrius Šidlauskas	Lithuania	27.75	Q, GR
2	5	Nikola Obrovac	Croatia	28.20	Q
3	7	Deniss Komars	Latvia	28.44	q
4	6	Charlie Attwood	Great Britain	28.55	
5	3	Egor Suchkov	Russia	28.67	
6	2	Federico Poggio	Italy	28.88	
7	1	Pau Solà	Spain	29.03	
8	8	Leo Schmidt	Germany	29.04	

==== Semifinal 2 ====
Rank	Lane	Name	Nationality	Time	Notes
1	3	Tobias Bjerg	Denmark	28.20	Q
2	6	Anton Chupkov	Russia	28.21	Q
3	4	Philip Greve	Denmark	28.26	q
4	5	Emre Sakçı	Turkey	28.46	q
5	2	Yevgen Kurkin	Ukraine	28.53	q
6	7	Anton Prakopau	Belarus	28.64	
7	1	Amir Haviv	Israel	28.79	
8	8	Jakub Březina	Czech Republic	29.17	

=== Final ===
The final was held at 19:03.

Rank	Lane	Name	Nationality	Time	Notes
1st place, gold medalist(s)	4	Andrius Šidlauskas	Lithuania	27.81	
2nd place, silver medalist(s)	5	Nikola Obrovac	Croatia	27.89	
3rd place, bronze medalist(s)	3	Tobias Bjerg	Denmark	28.04	
4	1	Emre Sakçı	Turkey	28.25	
5	2	Philip Greve	Denmark	28.27	
6	6	Anton Chupkov	Russia	28.29	
7	7	Deniss Komars	Latvia	28.47	
8	8	Yevgen Kurkin	Ukraine	28.74	
