= Swimming at the 2014 Summer Youth Olympics – Boys' 200 metre breaststroke =

Boys' 200 metre breaststroke at the 2014 Summer Youth Olympics
- Venue: Nanjing Olympic Sports Centre
- Dates: 20 August
- Competitors: 23 from 22 nations
- Winning time: 2:11.31

Medalists
gold medal	Ippei Watanabe	Japan
silver medal	Carlos Claverie	Venezuela
bronze medal	Anton Chupkov	Russia

The boys' 200 metre breaststroke event in swimming at the 2014 Summer Youth Olympics took place on 20 August at the Nanjing Olympic Sports Centre in Nanjing, China.

== Results ==
=== Heats ===
The heats were held at 10:19.

Rank	Heat	Lane	Name	Nationality	Time	Notes
1	1	5	Carlos Claverie	Venezuela	2:14.02	Q
2	1	4	Maximilian Pilger	Germany	2:14.65	Q
3	3	5	Anton Chupkov	Russia	2:15.46	Q
4	3	4	Ippei Watanabe	Japan	2:15.50	Q
5	2	4	Dávid Horváth	Hungary	2:15.69	Q
6	1	3	Cai Bing-rong	Chinese Taipei	2:15.78	Q
7	3	3	Andreas Mickosz	Brazil	2:16.62	Q
8	2	3	Jarred Crous	South Africa	2:16.65	Q
9	2	6	Luca Pfyffer	Switzerland	2:16.76	
10	3	7	Luis Jasso	Mexico	2:17.25	
11	1	6	Koki Tsunefuka	Japan	2:17.28	
12	3	2	Kim Jae-youn	South Korea	2:17.40	
13	3	6	Basten Caerts	Belgium	2:17.64	
14	2	5	Jean Dencausse	France	2:17.77	
15	2	7	Jacob Garrod	New Zealand	2:18.00	
16	3	8	Josué Domínguez	Dominican Republic	2:18.10	
17	1	2	Paulius Grigaliūnas	Lithuania	2:18.32	
18	3	1	Andrei Roman	Romania	2:18.72	
19	1	7	Huỳnh Thế Vĩ	Vietnam	2:21.45	
20	2	2	Grayson Bell	Australia	2:21.70	
21	2	1	Mohamed Fekiri	Tunisia	2:22.37	
22	2	8	Arnoldo Herrera	Costa Rica	2:27.46	
23	1	1	Sutton Choi	Hong Kong	2:29.98	

=== Final ===
The final was held at 18:12.

Rank	Lane	Name	Nationality	Time	Notes
1st place, gold medalist(s)	6	Ippei Watanabe	Japan	2:11.31	
2nd place, silver medalist(s)	4	Carlos Claverie	Venezuela	2:11.74	
3rd place, bronze medalist(s)	3	Anton Chupkov	Russia	2:11.87	
4	5	Maximilian Pilger	Germany	2:11.97	
5	2	Dávid Horváth	Hungary	2:12.39	
6	8	Jarred Crous	South Africa	2:15.52	
7	7	Cai Bing-rong	Chinese Taipei	2:16.89	
8	1	Andreas Mickosz	Brazil	2:17.17	
