= Swimming at the 2016 Summer Olympics – Men's 200 metre breaststroke =

Men's 200 metre breaststroke at the Games of the XXXI Olympiad
- Venue: Olympic Aquatics Stadium
- Dates: 9 August 2016 (heats & semifinals); 10 August 2016 (final)
- Competitors: 39 from 30 nations
- Winning time: 2:07.46 NR

Medalists
1st place, gold medalist(s)		Dmitriy Balandin	Kazakhstan
2nd place, silver medalist(s)		Josh Prenot	United States
3rd place, bronze medalist(s)		Anton Chupkov	Russia

The men's 200 metre breaststroke event at the 2016 Summer Olympics took place between 9–10 August at the Olympic Aquatics Stadium.

The winning margin was 0.07 seconds which as of 2023 remains the only time this event for men was won by less than a tenth of a second at the Olympics.

== Summary ==
Double Asian Games champion Dmitriy Balandin surprised the field from the outside to become Kazakhstan's first ever gold medalist in swimming. Coming from behind in lane eight, he produced a late surge about the midway of the final leg to upset the pool for an unexpected Olympic triumph with a 2:07.46. U.S. breaststroker Josh Prenot nearly charged to the front at the final stretch, before fading to a runner-up finish in 2:07.53, seven-hundredths of a second behind the Kazakh. Meanwhile, Russia's Anton Chupkov claimed the final podium spot, putting up a time of 2:07.70.

Great Britain's Andrew Willis improved upon his eighth-place feat from London 2012 to finish fourth with a 2:07.78, narrowly missing on a podium by eight-hundredths of a second. Japan's Yasuhiro Koseki seized a comfortable lead throughout the majority of the race but slipped down the order on the home stretch to finish fifth in 2:07.80. Koseki's teammate Ippei Watanabe posted a sixth-place time in 2:07.87, while defending World Champion Marco Koch of Germany (2:08.00) and Prenot's fellow countryman Kevin Cordes (2:08.34) rounded out the top eight.

Earlier in the semifinals, Watanabe threw down a top-seeded time of 2:07.22 to slice 0.06 seconds off the existing Olympic record set by Hungary's defending champion Dániel Gyurta, who had narrowly missed the top sixteen field in the heats.

== Records ==
Prior to this competition, the existing world and Olympic records were as follows.

World record	Akihiro Yamaguchi (JPN)	2:07.01	Gifu, Japan	15 September 2012
Olympic record	Dániel Gyurta (HUN)	2:07.28	London, United Kingdom	1 August 2012

The following records were established during the competition:

Date	Event	Name	Nationality	Time	Record
9 August	Semifinal 1	Ippei Watanabe	Japan	2:07.22	OR

== Competition format ==
The competition consisted of three rounds: heats, semifinals, and a final. The swimmers with the best 16 times in the heats advanced to the semifinals. The swimmers with the best 8 times in the semifinals advanced to the final. Swim-offs were used as necessary to break ties for advancement to the next round.

== Results ==
=== Heats ===
Rank	Heat	Lane	Name	Nationality	Time	Notes
1	5	3	Anton Chupkov	Russia	2:07.93	Q, NR
2	3	4	Yasuhiro Koseki	Japan	2:08.61	Q
3	4	5	Andrew Willis	Great Britain	2:08.92	Q
4	3	3	Ilya Khomenko	Russia	2:08.94	Q
5	4	4	Marco Koch	Germany	2:08.98	Q
6	4	6	Dmitriy Balandin	Kazakhstan	2:09.00	Q
7	5	5	Kevin Cordes	United States	2:09.30	Q
8	4	3	Ippei Watanabe	Japan	2:09.63	Q
9	3	6	Mao Feilian	China	2:09.80	Q
10	5	4	Josh Prenot	United States	2:09.91	Q
11	4	2	Matti Mattsson	Finland	2:10.09	Q
12	3	7	Erik Persson	Sweden	2:10.17	Q
13	3	1	Li Xiang	China	2:10.17	Q
14	4	1	Carlos Claverie	Venezuela	2:10.35	Q
15	5	6	Craig Benson	Great Britain	2:11.19	Q
16	5	1	Luca Pizzini	Italy	2:11.26	Q
17	3	5	Dániel Gyurta	Hungary	2:11.28	
18	5	7	Anton Sveinn McKee	Iceland	2:11.39	
19	2	3	Nicholas Quinn	Ireland	2:11.67	
20	2	8	Yannick Käser	Switzerland	2:11.77	
21	2	7	Laurent Carnol	Luxembourg	2:11.94	
22	4	7	Giedrius Titenis	Lithuania	2:12.13	
23	1	5	Glenn Snyders	New Zealand	2:12.47	
24	5	8	Ashton Baumann	Canada	2:12.61	
25	4	8	Jarred Crous	South Africa	2:12.64	
26	3	2	Cameron van der Burgh	South Africa	2:12.67	
27	3	8	Panagiotis Samilidis	Greece	2:12.68	
28	2	1	Jorge Murillo	Colombia	2:12.81	
29	2	4	Tales Cerdeira	Brazil	2:12.83	
30	1	4	Dávid Horváth	Hungary	2:13.24	
31	2	2	Choi Kyu-woong	South Korea	2:13.36	
32	1	3	Basten Caerts	Belgium	2:13.44	
33	1	6	Martin Allikvee	Estonia	2:13.66	
34	1	2	Lee Hsuan-yen	Chinese Taipei	2:14.84	
35	2	5	Dimitrios Koulouris	Greece	2:14.86	
36	5	2	Thiago Simon	Brazil	2:15.01	
37	2	6	Dmytro Oseledets	Ukraine	2:15.19	
38	1	1	Denis Petrashov	Kyrgyzstan	2:16.57	
39	1	7	Arya Nasimi Shad	Iran	2:20.18	

=== Semifinals ===
==== Semifinal 1 ====
Rank	Lane	Name	Nationality	Time	Notes
1	6	Ippei Watanabe	Japan	2:07.22	Q, OR
2	2	Josh Prenot	United States	2:07.78	Q
3	4	Yasuhiro Koseki	Japan	2:07.91	Q
4	3	Dmitriy Balandin	Kazakhstan	2:08.20	Q
5	5	Ilya Khomenko	Russia	2:09.73	
6	7	Erik Persson	Sweden	2:10.12	
7	8	Luca Pizzini	Italy	2:11.53	
8	1	Carlos Claverie	Venezuela	2:11.56	

==== Semifinal 2 ====
Rank	Lane	Name	Nationality	Time	Notes
1	5	Andrew Willis	Great Britain	2:07.73	Q
2	6	Kevin Cordes	United States	2:07.99	Q
3	4	Anton Chupkov	Russia	2:08.08	Q
4	3	Marco Koch	Germany	2:08.12	Q
5	2	Mao Feilian	China	2:09.64	
6	1	Li Xiang	China	2:10.92	
7	8	Craig Benson	Great Britain	2:10.93	
8	7	Matti Mattsson	Finland	2:12.99	

=== Final ===
Rank	Lane	Name	Nationality	Time	Notes
1st place, gold medalist(s)	8	Dmitriy Balandin	Kazakhstan	2:07.46	NR
2nd place, silver medalist(s)	3	Josh Prenot	United States	2:07.53	
3rd place, bronze medalist(s)	7	Anton Chupkov	Russia	2:07.70	NR
4	5	Andrew Willis	Great Britain	2:07.78	
5	6	Yasuhiro Koseki	Japan	2:07.80	
6	4	Ippei Watanabe	Japan	2:07.87	
7	1	Marco Koch	Germany	2:08.00	
8	2	Kevin Cordes	United States	2:08.34	
