= Swimming at the 2015 European Games – Men's 4 × 100 metre medley relay =

Men's 4 × 100 metre medley relay at the 2015 European Games
- Venue: Aquatic Palace
- Dates: 27 June
- Competitors: 86 from 18 nations
- Winning time: 3:36.38

Medalists
| gold medal | Filipp Shopin; Anton Chupkov; Daniil Pakhomov; Vladislav Kozlov; Roman Larin; Egor Suchkov; Daniil Antipov; Aleksei Brianskiy | Russia |
| silver medal | Luke Greenbank; Charlie Attwood; Duncan Scott; Martyn Walton; Joe Hulme; Luke Davies; Kyle Chisholm; Cameron Kurle | Great Britain |
| bronze medal | Jakub Skierka; Jacek Arentewicz; Michał Chudy; Paweł Sendyk; Damian Chrzanowski; Michał Brzuś | Poland |

The men's 4 × 100 metre medley relay event at the 2015 European Games in Baku took place on 27 June at the Aquatic Palace.

== Results ==
=== Heats ===
The heats were started at 10:44.

| Rank | Heat | Lane | Nation | Swimmers | Time | Notes |
|---|---|---|---|---|---|---|
| 1 | 1 | 5 | Russia | Roman Larin (55.96); Egor Suchkov (1:02.12); Daniil Antipov (54.17); Aleksei Brianskiy (50.05) | 3:42.30 | Q, GR |
| 2 | 2 | 6 | Italy | Jacopo Bietti (57.38); Alex Baldisseri (1:03.27); Giacomo Carini (54.26); Alessandro Miressi (49.82) | 3:44.73 | Q |
| 3 | 1 | 0 | Poland | Jakub Skierka (56.30); Jacek Arentewicz (1:02.51); Damian Chrzanowski (55.15); Michał Brzuś (51.29) | 3:45.25 | Q |
| 4 | 1 | 8 | Germany | Ole Braunschweig (56.69); Leo Schmidt (1:03.60); Paulus Schön (54.77); Konstantin Walter (51.10) | 3:46.16 | Q |
| 5 | 1 | 9 | Great Britain | Joe Hulme (56.35); Luke Davies (1:04.07); Kyle Chisholm (55.05); Cameron Kurle (50.96) | 3:46.43 | Q |
| 6 | 2 | 1 | Spain | Javier Romero (56.98); Pau Solà (1:03.49); Javier Barrena (55.07); Guillem Pujol (51.11) | 3:46.65 | Q |
| 7 | 2 | 2 | Sweden | Petter Fredriksson (56.89); Teodor Widerberg (1:04.60); Markus Malm (55.29); Daniel Forndal (50.34) | 3:47.12 | Q |
| 8 | 1 | 2 | Belarus | Mikita Tsmyh (56.60); Anton Prakopau (1:03.86); Pavel Bashura (56.87); Hryhory Pekarski (52.07) | 3:49.40 | Q |
| 9 | 2 | 9 | Estonia | Andrei Gussev (57.40); Silver Hein (1:06.11); Daniel Zaitsev (54.58); Cevin Siim (51.71) | 3:49.80 | |
| 10 | 1 | 1 | Hungary | Bence Szucsik (57.60); Richárd Miksi (1:04.79); Márk Tekauer (56.91); Ármin Reményi (50.79) | 3:50.09 | |
| 11 | 2 | 7 | Croatia | Kristian Komlenić (56.29); Ante Lučev (1:05.24); Bruno Blašković (55.55); Nikola Miljenić (53.29) | 3:50.37 | |
| 12 | 2 | 4 | Greece | Nikolaos Sofianidis (56.04); Georgios Fragkoudakis (1:02.95); Athanasios Kynigakis (59.10); Dimitrios Dimitriou (52.65) | 3:50.74 | |
| 13 | 1 | 4 | Israel | Daniel Aizenberg (58.94); Iliya Gladishev (1:04.26); Kirill Baron (56.70); Mark Shperkin (50.92) | 3:50.82 | |
| 14 | 2 | 6 | Turkey | Rasim Oğulcan Gör (58.58); Batuhan Hakan (1:06.84); Berk Özkul (55.23); Kaan Özcan (52.23) | 3:52.88 | |
| 15 | 1 | 3 | Azerbaijan | Qriqoriy Kalminskiy (59.79); Anton Jeltyakov (1:04.02); Ivan Andrianov (55.10); Dorian Fazekas (54.00) | 3:52.91 | |
| 16 | 2 | 5 | Norway | Marius Solaat Rødland (59.51); Mads Henry Steinland (1:05.17); Sigurd Holten Bøen (56.86); Ole-Mikal Fløgstad (53.77) | 3:55.31 | |
| 17 | 2 | 0 | Ireland | Rory McEvoy (58.83); Alan Corby (1:09.23); James Brown (55.91); Andrew Moore (52.86) | 3:56.83 | |
| | 1 | 7 | Switzerland | Timothy Schlatter (59.63); Nico Spahn; Thomas Maurer; Manuel Leuthard | DSQ | |
| | 2 | 3 | Ukraine | | DNS | |
| | 2 | 8 | France | | DNS | |

=== Final ===
The final was held at 19:55.

| Rank | Lane | Nation | Swimmers | Time | Notes |
|---|---|---|---|---|---|
| 1st place, gold medalist(s) | 4 | Russia | Filipp Shopin (55.47); Anton Chupkov (1:00.27); Daniil Pakhomov (51.55); Vladislav Kozlov (49.09) | 3:36.38 | GR, WJ |
| 2nd place, silver medalist(s) | 2 | Great Britain | Luke Greenbank (54.64) GR; Charlie Attwood (1:01.36); Duncan Scott (52.79); Martyn Walton (50.22) | 3:39.01 | |
| 3rd place, bronze medalist(s) | 3 | Poland | Jakub Skierka (55.85); Jacek Arentewicz (1:01.22); Michał Chudy (52.86); Paweł Sendyk (49.38) | 3:39.31 | |
| 4 | 5 | Italy | Lorenzo Glessi (56.58); Alex Baldisseri (1:01.60); Giacomo Carini (53.60); Alessandro Miressi (49.18) | 3:40.96 | |
| 5 | 6 | Germany | Marek Ulrich (55.73); Leo Schmidt (1:02.50); Johannes Tesch (53.70); Konstantin Walter (50.63) | 3:42.56 | |
| 6 | 7 | Spain | Javier Romero (57.26); Pau Solà (1:03.24); Alberto Lozano (53.21); Guillem Pujol (50.41) | 3:44.12 | |
| 7 | 1 | Sweden | Petter Fredriksson (56.84); Teodor Widerberg (1:04.49); Markus Malm (55.80); Daniel Forndal (50.20) | 3:47.33 | |
| 8 | 2 | Belarus | Mikita Tsmyh (56.66); Anton Prakopau (1:04.08); Pavel Bashura (56.11); Hryhory Pekarski (53.31) | 3:50.16 | |
