= 2019 European Short Course Swimming Championships =

Water sport competitions

- Host city: Glasgow, Great Britain
- Date(s): 4–8 December
- Venue(s): Tollcross International Swimming Centre
- Events: 40

The 2019 European Short Course Swimming Championships took place in Glasgow, Scotland, from 4 to 8 December 2019.

== Medal table ==
* Host nation (Great Britain)

Rank	Nation	Gold	Silver	Bronze	Total
1	Russia (RUS)	13	5	4	22
2	Italy (ITA)	6	7	7	20
3	Netherlands (NED)	5	1	4	10
4	Hungary (HUN)	4	4	3	11
5	Great Britain (GBR)*	3	4	4	11
6	France (FRA)	2	5	2	9
7	Poland (POL)	2	1	2	5
8	Greece (GRE)	2	0	2	4
9	Lithuania (LTU)	2	0	0	2
10	Germany (GER)	1	5	2	8
11	Belarus (BLR)	1	1	1	3
12	Norway (NOR)	0	2	0	2
13	Turkey (TUR)	0	1	1	2
14	Sweden (SWE)	0	1	0	1
14	Switzerland (SUI)	0	1	0	1
14	Ukraine (UKR)	0	1	0	1
17	Denmark (DEN)	0	0	5	5
18	Finland (FIN)	0	0	2	2
18	Ireland (IRL)	0	0	2	2
20	Romania (ROU)	0	0	1	1
Totals (20 entries)		41	39	42	122

== Results ==
=== Men's events ===
Event	Gold		Silver		Bronze	
50 m freestyle (details)	Vladimir Morozov; Russia	20.40	Florent Manaudou; France	20.66	Maxim Lobanovszkij; Hungary	20.76; NR
100 m freestyle (details)	Vladimir Morozov; Russia	45.53	Alessandro Miressi; Italy	45.90; NR	Vladislav Grinev; Russia	46.35
200 m freestyle (details)	Danas Rapšys; Lithuania	1:41.12	Duncan Scott; Great Britain	1:41.42	Mikhail Vekovishchev; Russia	1:41.52
400 m freestyle (details)	Danas Rapšys; Lithuania	3:33.20; CR, NR	Thomas Dean; Great Britain	3:37.95	Gabriele Detti; Italy	3:38.06
1500 m freestyle (details)	Gregorio Paltrinieri; Italy	14:17.14	Henrik Christiansen; Norway	14:18.15; NR	David Aubry; France	14:25.66
50 m backstroke (details)	Kliment Kolesnikov; Russia	22.75	Christian Diener; Germany	23.07	Shane Ryan; Ireland	23.12
100 m backstroke (details)	Kliment Kolesnikov; Russia	49.09	Christian Diener; Germany	49.94 =NR	Robert Glință; Romania	50.30
200 m backstroke (details)	Radosław Kawęcki; Poland	1:49.26	Christian Diener; Germany	1:50.05	Luke Greenbank; Great Britain	1:50.09; NR
50 m breaststroke (details)	Vladimir Morozov; Russia	25.51; ER, CR	Hüseyin Emre Sakçı; Turkey	25.82; NR	Arno Kamminga; Netherlands Fabio Scozzoli; Italy	25.84; NR
100 m breaststroke (details)	Arno Kamminga; Netherlands	56.06; NR	Ilya Shymanovich; Belarus	56.42	Fabio Scozzoli; Italy	56.55
200 m breaststroke (details)	Arno Kamminga; Netherlands	2:02.36; NR	Erik Persson; Sweden	2:02.80; NR	Marco Koch; Germany	2:02.87
50 m butterfly (details)	Oleg Kostin; Russia	22.23	Szebasztián Szabó; Hungary	22.35	Ümitcan Güreş; Turkey	22.38; NR
100 m butterfly (details)	Marius Kusch; Germany	49.06; NR	Mikhail Vekovishchev; Russia	49.53	Marcin Cieślak; Poland	49.75
200 m butterfly (details)	Andreas Vazaios; Greece	1:50.23; NR	Ramon Klenz; Germany	1:51.51	James Guy; Great Britain	1:51.73
100 m individual medley (details)	Kliment Kolesnikov; Russia	51.15	Sergey Fesikov; Russia	51.59	Andreas Vazaios; Greece	51.62; NR
200 m individual medley (details)	Andreas Vazaios; Greece	1:50.85; ER, CR	Tomoe Zenimoto Hvas; Norway	1:51.74; NR	Philip Heintz; Germany	1:52.55
400 m individual medley (details)	Max Litchfield; Great Britain	4:01.36	Ilya Borodin; Russia	4:03.65; NR	Daniil Pasynkov; Russia	4:04.98
4 × 50 m freestyle relay (details)	Russia; Vladislav Grinev (21.23); Mikhail Vekovishchev (20.60); Kliment Kolesnikov (20.84); Vladimir Morozov (20.25); Sergey Fesikov; Daniil Markov; Aleksandr Popkov	1:22.92	Poland; Paweł Juraszek (21.19); Marcin Cieślak (20.98); Karol Ostrowski (20.79); Jakub Kraska (20.78)	1:23.74; NR	Italy; Federico Bocchia (21.41); Marco Orsi (21.13); Giovanni Izzo (21.32); Alessandro Miressi (20.64); Leonardo Deplano; Thomas Ceccon	1:24.50
4 × 50 m medley relay (details)	Russia; Kliment Kolesnikov (22.64) CR; Vladimir Morozov (25.53); Oleg Kostin (21.61); Vladislav Grinev (20.85); Sergey Fesikov; Aleksandr Popkov; Mikhail Vekovishchev	1:30.63	Hungary; Richárd Bohus (23.42) NR; Dávid Horváth (26.64); Szebasztián Szabó (21.77); Maksim Lobanovskij (20.27)	1:32.10; NR	Belarus; Viktar Staselovich (23.38); Ilya Shymanovich (25.46); Yauhen Tsurkin (22.48); Artsiom Machekin (20.97)	1:32.29

=== Women's events ===
Event	Gold		Silver		Bronze	
50 m freestyle (details)	Maria Kameneva; Russia	23.56	Mélanie Henique; France	23.66; NR	Pernille Blume; Denmark	23.73
100 m freestyle (details)	Freya Anderson; Great Britain	51.49	Béryl Gastaldello; France	51.85	Femke Heemskerk; Netherlands	51.88
200 m freestyle (details)	Freya Anderson; Great Britain	1:52.77; NR	Federica Pellegrini; Italy	1:52.88	Femke Heemskerk; Netherlands	1:53.35
400 m freestyle (details)	Simona Quadarella; Italy	3:59.75	Isabel Marie Gose; Germany	4:00.01	Ajna Késely; Hungary	4:00.04
800 m freestyle (details)	Simona Quadarella; Italy	8:10.30	Ajna Késely; Hungary	8:11.77	Martina Caramignoli; Italy	8:12.36
50 m backstroke (details)	Kira Toussaint; Netherlands	25.84	Béryl Gastaldello; France	26.03; NR	Alicja Tchórz; Poland	26.16
100 m backstroke (details)	Kira Toussaint; Netherlands	55.71	Maria Kameneva; Russia	56.10; NR	Georgia Davies; Great Britain	56.73
200 m backstroke (details)	Margherita Panziera; Italy	2:01.45; NR	Daryna Zevina; Ukraine	2:02.25	Kira Toussaint; Netherlands	2:03.04
50 m breaststroke (details)	Benedetta Pilato; Italy	29.32; WJR, NR	Martina Carraro; Italy	29.60	Mona McSharry; Ireland	29.87; NR
100 m breaststroke (details)	Martina Carraro; Italy	1:04.51	Arianna Castiglioni; Italy	1:05.01	Jenna Laukkanen; Finland	1:05.12
200 m breaststroke (details)	Maria Temnikova; Russia	2:18.35	Molly Renshaw; Great Britain	2:19.66	Martina Carraro; Italy	2:19.68; NR
50 m butterfly (details)	Mélanie Henique; France	24.56; CR, NR	Béryl Gastaldello; France	24.78	Emilie Beckmann; Denmark Jeanette Ottesen; Denmark	25.15
100 m butterfly (details)	Anastasiya Shkurdai; Belarus	56.21; NR	Elena Di Liddo; Italy	56.37	Anna Ntountounaki; Greece	56.44; NR
200 m butterfly (details)	Katinka Hosszú; Hungary	2:03.21	Ilaria Bianchi; Italy	2:04.20; NR	Zsuzsanna Jakabos; Hungary	2:05.00
100 m individual medley (details)	Katinka Hosszú; Hungary	57.36	Maria Kameneva; Russia	57.59; NR	Jenna Laukkanen; Finland	58.62
200 m individual medley (details)	Katinka Hosszú; Hungary	2:04.68	Maria Ugolkova; Switzerland	2:06.59; NR	Siobhan-Marie O'Connor; Great Britain	2:06.74
400 m individual medley (details)	Katinka Hosszú; Hungary	4:25.10	Zsuzsanna Jakabos; Hungary	4:28.76	Ilaria Cusinato; Italy	4:29.13
4 × 50 m freestyle relay (details)	France; Béryl Gastaldello (23.85); Mélanie Henique (23.30); Léna Bousquin (24.40); Anna Santamans (23.66); Anouchka Martin Netherlands; Tamara van Vliet (24.19); Kira Toussaint (23.90); Femke Heemskerk (23.24); Valerie van Roon (23.62)	1:35.21; NR	Not awarded		Denmark; Julie Kepp Jensen (24.44); Jeanette Ottesen (23.61); Emilie Beckmann (23.99); Pernille Blume (23.20); Emily Gantriis	1:35.24; NR
4 × 50 m medley relay (details)	Poland; Alicja Tchórz (26.29); Dominika Sztandera (29.55); Kornelia Fiedkiewicz (25.75); Katarzyna Wasick (23.26)	1:44.85; NR	Italy; Silvia Scalia (26.60); Benedetta Pilato (29.18); Elena Di Liddo (25.02); Silvia Di Pietro (24.12); Arianna Castiglioni; Federica Pellegrini	1:44.92; NR	Russia; Maria Kameneva (26.22); Nika Godun (30.11); Arina Surkova (24.70); Daria S. Ustinova (23.93)	1:44.96; NR

=== Mixed events ===
Event	Gold		Silver		Bronze	
4 × 50 m freestyle relay	Russia; Vladimir Morozov (20.65); Vladislav Grinev (20.65); Arina Surkova (23.87); Maria Kameneva (23.17); Mikhail Vekovishchev; Daria S. Ustinova; Elizaveta Klevanovich	1:28.31; ER, CR	Great Britain; Duncan Scott (21.28); Scott McLay (20.79); Anna Hopkin (23.13); Freya Anderson (23.44); James Guy	1:28.64; NR	France; Maxime Grousset (21.35); Florent Manaudou (20.09); Melanie Henique (23.36); Béryl Gastaldello (24.06); Clément Mignon; Anna Santamans	1:28.86; NR
4 × 50 m medley relay	Russia; Kliment Kolesnikov (22.67); Vladimir Morozov (25.40); Arina Surkova (24.94); Maria Kameneva (23.21); Sergey Fesikov; Oleg Kostin; Daria S. Ustinova	1:36.22; WR	Netherlands; Kira Toussaint (25.87); Arno Kamminga (25.53); Joeri Verlinden (22.48); Femke Heemskerk (23.24); Jesse Puts	1:37.12	Denmark; Mathias Rysgaard (23.98); Tobias Bjerg (25.51); Jeanette Ottesen (25.04); Pernille Blume (23.49); Emilie Beckmann; Emily Gantriis	1:38.02; NR
