= Jakub Skierka =

Polish swimmer (born 1998)

Personal information
- Born: 4 October 1998 (age 27)
- Height: 1.79 m (5 ft 10 in)
- Weight: 74 kg (163 lb)

Sport
- Sport: Swimming
- Strokes: Backstroke
Medal record
Men's swimming
Representing Poland
European Games
Bronze medal – third place	2015 Baku	4×100 m medley
European Junior Championships
Silver medal – second place	2016 Hódmezővásárhely	200 m backstroke
Bronze medal – third place	2016 Hódmezővásárhely	4×100 m medley

Jakub Skierka (born 4 October 1998) is a Polish swimmer. He competed in the men's 200 meter backstroke event at the 2017 World Aquatics Championships.
