= Anton Chupkov =

Russian swimmer (born 1997)

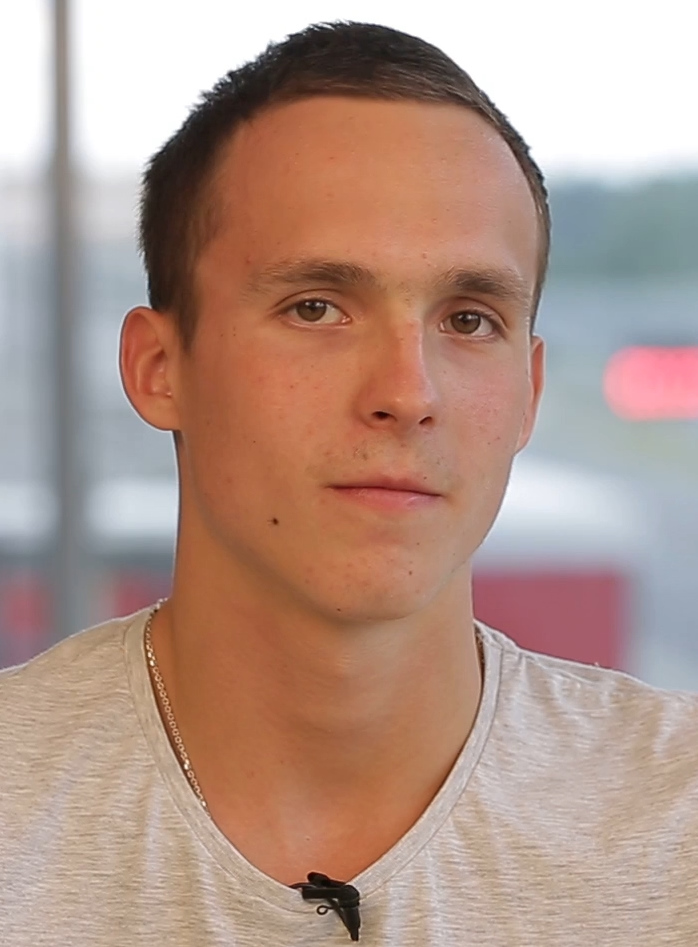
- Chupkov in 2016

Personal information
- Full name: Anton Mikhailovich Chupkov
- National team: Russia
- Born: 22 February 1997 (age 29) Moscow, Russia
- Height: 1.89 m (6 ft 2 in)
- Weight: 71 kg (157 lb)

Sport
- Sport: Swimming
- Strokes: Breaststroke, medley
- Club: Toronto Titans (ISL 2020); Energy Standard (ISL 2019); Olympic Reserve "Youth of Moscow", Lokomotiv
Medal record
Men's swimming
Representing Russia
Olympic Games
Bronze medal – third place	2016 Rio de Janeiro	200 m breaststroke
World Championships
Gold medal – first place	2017 Budapest	200 m breaststroke
Gold medal – first place	2019 Gwangju	200 m breaststroke
Bronze medal – third place	2017 Budapest	4×100 m medley
Bronze medal – third place	2019 Gwangju	4×100 m medley
European Championships (LC)
Gold medal – first place	2018 Glasgow	200 m breaststroke
Gold medal – first place	2020 Budapest	200 m breaststroke
Silver medal – second place	2018 Glasgow	4×100 m medley
Silver medal – second place	2020 Budapest	4×100 m medley
Bronze medal – third place	2018 Glasgow	100 m breaststroke
European Games
Gold medal – first place	2015 Baku	100 m breaststroke
Gold medal – first place	2015 Baku	200 m breaststroke
Gold medal – first place	2015 Baku	4×100 m medley
Gold medal – first place	2015 Baku	4×100 m mixed medley
Military World Games
Gold medal – first place	2019 Wuhan	100 m breaststroke
Gold medal – first place	2019 Wuhan	200 m breaststroke
Gold medal – first place	2019 Wuhan	4×100 m medley
Youth Olympic Games
Gold medal – first place	2014 Nanjing	100 m breaststroke
Gold medal – first place	2014 Nanjing	4×100 m medley
Silver medal – second place	2014 Nanjing	4×100 m mixed medley
Bronze medal – third place	2014 Nanjing	50 m breaststroke
Bronze medal – third place	2014 Nanjing	200 m breaststroke

Anton Mikhailovich Chupkov (Russian: Антон Михайлович Чупков; born 22 February 1997) is a retired Russian competitive swimmer. He is the European record holder in the long course 200 metre breaststroke and the Russian record holder in the long course 100 metre breaststroke. He formerly held the world record in the long course 200 metre breaststroke. At the 2015 European Games he won four gold medals in individual and relay events. He won the bronze medal in the 200 metre breaststroke at the 2016 Summer Olympics. He won the gold medal in the 200 metre breaststroke at the 2017 and 2019 World Aquatics Championships.

== Background ==
Chupkov trains at the Sports School of Olympic Reserve "Youth of Moscow" for swimming. He has been member of the Russian Federation youth national team in swimming since 2013. Chupkov swam distances of 100 metre and 200 metre breaststroke in 2014.

== Career ==
=== 2013 ===
In 2013, Chupkov competed at the 2013 European Youth Summer Olympic Festival taking the gold medal in 200 metre breaststroke and the silver medal in the 100 metre breaststroke.

=== 2014 ===
In 2014, Chupkov competed at the 2014 European Junior Championships winning two bronze medals, one in the 50 metre breaststroke and one in the 100 metre breaststroke, a silver medal in the 200 metre breaststroke, and he won gold medals as part of the Russian team in 4×100 metre medley relay and the 4×100 metre mixed medley relay. From 17 to 22 August, Chupkov competed at the 2014 Youth Olympics in Nanjing, China, where he won five medals including gold medals in 100 metre breaststroke and 4×100 metre medley relay.

=== 2015 ===
On 20 April 2015, when he was 18 years old, Chupkov won the gold medal and became the Russian champion in the 200 metre breaststroke. He also competed in the 50 metre and 100 metre breaststroke.

==== 2015 European Games ====
2015 European Games
Gold medal – first place	200 m breaststroke	2:10.85
Gold medal – first place	4×100 m mixed medley	3:49.53 (GR)
Gold medal – first place	100 m breaststroke	1:00.65 (GR, WJ)
Gold medal – first place	4×100 medley	3:36.38 (GR, WJ)

In June 2015 at the inaugural 2015 European Games in Baku, Azerbaijan Chupkov won four gold medals, in the 200 metre breaststroke, the 100 metre breaststroke, the 4×100 metre medley relay (with Daniil Pakhomov, Vladislav Kozlov and Filipp Shopin touching in 3:36.38) in a new world junior record and breaking the previous record held by Russia at 3:38.02 from the 2014 Youth Olympics, and the 4×100 metre mixed medley relay (with Daniil Pakhomov, Arina Openysheva and Maria Kameneva at a time of 3:49.53). Chupkov broke two world junior records including a previous record set by himself at the 2014 Youth Olympics. He was selected as the Russian athlete to serve as flag bearer for and carry the flag of Russia at the closing ceremony of the Games.

==== World Championships ====
Chupkov appeared in his first senior Worlds at the 2015 World Championships in Kazan, where he qualified in the 200 metre breaststroke final finishing in 7th place in a time of 2:09.96, after previously setting a world junior record in the semifinals in a time of 2:09.64.

==== World Junior Championships ====
Chupkov also competed at the 2015 World Junior Championships in Singapore; he won gold medals in two individual events, the 100 metre breaststroke (1:00.19) and the 200 metre breaststroke (2:10.19, a meet record), and finished 7th in the 50 metre breaststroke final. In relay events, Chupkov competed in the 4×100 metre mixed medley (with Daniil Pakhomov, Irina Pridhoko and Arina Openysheva), where Russia set a new world junior record at 3:45.85, and in the 4×100 metre medley (with Daniil Pakhomov, Vladislav Kozlov, Roman Larin, finishing in 3:36.44), setting a new championships record.

=== 2016 ===
In June 2016 as part of the Mare Nostrum stop in Canet-en-Roussillon, France, Chupkov broke the Russian record of 2:08.62 set in 2013 by Vyacheslav Sinkevich in the 200 metre breaststroke with a time of 2:08.53.

==== 2016 Summer Olympics ====
2016 Summer Olympics
Bronze medal – third place	200 m breaststroke	2:07.70 (NR)

At the 2016 Summer Olympics in Rio de Janeiro, Brazil, Chupkov won his first Olympic medal, the bronze medal in the 200 metre breaststroke with a time of 2:07.70. In the prelims heats of the 200 metre breaststroke, Chupkov set a new Russian record with a time of 2:07.93, which lowered the former record by over six-tenths of a second. Chupkov swam a new Russian record of 2:07.70 in the final on 10 August to win the bronze medal, finishing after gold medalist Dmitriy Balandin of Kazakhstan and silver medalist Josh Prenot of the United States.

=== 2017 ===
For the stop of the 2017 Mare Nostrum held in Barcelona, Spain, Chupkov set a new Russian record in the long course 100 metre breaststroke with a time of 59.39 seconds on 13 June. On 18 June, at the stop in Canet-en-Roussillon, France, Chupkov lowered the Russian record in the 200 metre breaststroke to a 2:07.46.

==== World Championships ====
2017 World Championships
Gold medal – first place	200 m breaststroke	2:06.96 (CR, ER)
Bronze medal – third place	4×100 m medley	3:29.76

In July 2017, at the 2017 World Aquatics Championships held at Danube Arena in Budapest, Hungary, Chupkov started his competition in the prelims heats of the 200 metre breaststroke where he qualified for the semifinals ranking first with a 2:08.23 on 27 July. Following up his prelims heats performance in the evening semifinals, Chupkov set a new Championships record, European record, and Russian record in the 200 metre breaststroke with a time of 2:07.14. In the final of the 200 metre breaststroke the next day, 28 July, Chupkov won the gold medal in a time of 2:06.96, lowering the previous Championships, European, and Russian records he had set in the semifinals and finishing over three-tenths of a second ahead of silver medalist Yasuhiro Koseki of Japan and over half a second ahead of bronze medalist Ippei Watanabe of Japan. On the final day of competition, 30 July, Chupkov won a bronze medal for his contributions as part of the 4×100 metre medley relay, splitting a 59.06 for the breaststroke leg of the relay in the prelims heats.

=== 2018 ===
==== European Aquatics Championships ====
At the 2018 European Aquatics Championships in Glasgow, Scotland, Chupkov won the bronze medal in the 100 metre breaststroke with a 59.06, finishing behind gold medalist Adam Peaty of Great Britain and silver medalist James Wilby of Great Britain. In the 200 metre breaststroke, Chupkov won the gold medal with a time of 2:06.80 and set new Championships, European, and Russian records in the event. For the 4×100 metre medley relay, Chupkov split a 1:00.40 on the breaststroke leg of the relay in the final to help win the silver medal in a time of 3:32.03.

=== 2019 ===
==== World Championships ====
2019 World Championships
Gold medal – first place	200 m breaststroke	2:06.12 (WR)
Bronze medal – third place	4×100 m medley	3:28.81

Chupkov won the world title in the 200 metre breaststroke at the 2019 World Aquatics Championships in Gwangju, South Korea, marking the second time in a row he won the world title in the event after first winning the title in 2017. In the prelims heats of the 200 metre breaststroke, he qualified for the semifinals ranking second behind first-ranked Matthew Wilson of Australia and ahead of third-ranked Marco Koch of Germany with a time of 2:08.22. Later the same day Chupkov ranked second in the semifinals, swimming a time of 2:06.83. In the final of the 200 metre breaststroke the following day, Chupkov won the gold medal and the world title in a new world record time of 2:06.12, which lowered the previous record of 2:06.67 by over half a second. Chupkov won his second medal of the Championships in the 4×100 metre medley relay, where he won a bronze medal for his prelims efforts swimming the breaststroke leg of the relay in 58.90 seconds when the finals relay placed third in 3:28.81.

==== International Swimming League ====
In the autumn of 2019 Chupkov was a member of the inaugural International Swimming League swimming for the Energy Standard Swim Club. He won the 200 metre breaststroke at the matches held in Indianapolis, United States on 5 and 6 October and in London, United Kingdom on 23 and 24 November.

==== 2019 Military World Games ====
At the 2019 Military World Games in Wuhan, China in mid-October 2019, Chupkov won his first medal in the 100 metre breaststroke, swimming a time of 59.17 seconds to win the gold medal and finish 0.10 seconds ahead of silver medalist Yan Zibei of China. Chupkov also won the gold medal in the 200 metre breaststroke, finishing in 2:07.95 and over half a second ahead of the silver medalist in the event, Qin Haiyang of China. On the breaststroke leg of the 4×100 metre medley relay, Chupkov split a 58.72 to help win the silver medal in a final time of 3:33.57.

==== Swimming World Cup ====
At the 2019 FINA Swimming World Cup stop in Kazan in November and conducted in long course metres, Chupkov broke the Russian record of 59.05 set by Kirill Prigoda in the 100 metre breaststroke with a time of 58.94 seconds and won the gold medal in the event, finishing four-hundredths of a second ahead of silver medalist Arno Kamminga of the Netherlands.

=== 2020 ===
==== International Swimming League ====
In the spring of 2020, Chupkov signed on to compete for the Toronto Titans, the first Canadian based professional swim team in the ISL, in their inaugural season, the 2020 International Swimming League.

==== 2020 Russian Championships ====
At the 2020 Russian Championships in October, Chupkov set a new Russian record in the long course 100 metre breaststroke with a time of 58.83 seconds, which broke the former record of 58.94 seconds he set at the 2019 FINA Swimming World Cup.

=== 2021 ===
==== European Aquatics Championships ====
At the 2020 European Aquatics Championships held in Budapest, Hungary in May 2021, Chupkov placed tenth in the semifinals of the 100 metre breaststroke on 17 May with a time of 59.49 seconds. In the 200 metre breaststroke final on 20 May, Chupkov won the gold medal with a time of 2:06.99, which made him the only medalist to swim the race in less than 2:07.00. He also won a silver medal in the 4×100 metre medley relay, contributing a split of 58.94 seconds for the breaststroke leg of the relay in the prelims heats before Kirill Prigoda substituted in for Chupkov in the final.

==== 2020 Summer Olympics ====
In July and August 2021 at the 2020 Summer Olympics held in Tokyo, Japan and postponed to 2021 due to the COVID-19 pandemic, Chupkov placed fourth in the 200 metre breaststroke final with a time of 2:07.24, fourth in the 4×100 metre medley relay swimming the breaststroke leg of the relay in 59.55 in the prelims heats, and 16th in the 100 metre breaststroke with a 59.93 in the semifinals. Along with all other Russian competitors at the Games in all sports, he was required to compete under the name Russian Olympic Committee with outfits and a song chosen by the International Olympic Committee in place of their country name, outfits, flag and anthem, all as part of a Court of Arbitration for Sport ban against such items for Russians at World Championships between 17 December 2020 and 16 December 2022.

==== Swimming World Cup ====
In October 2021, Chupkov competed in the third 2021 FINA Swimming World Cup stop, which was held in Doha, Qatar, where he won the bronze medal in the short course 100 metre breaststroke with a 57.56, placed sixth in the 50 metre breaststroke with a 26.90, and won the bronze medal in the 200 metre breaststroke with a 2:03.08. Later in the month he also competed in the fourth and final World Cup stop, held at the Palace of Water Sports in Kazan, winning the bronze medal in the 200 metre breaststroke in 2:02.71, the bronze medal in the 100 metre breaststroke with a 57.30, and placing 14th in the 50 metre breaststroke with a time of 27.06 seconds. Ranked across all four stops of the World Cup circuit for his performances, Chupkov came in at number 22 overall amongst all male competitors in terms of total number of points scored and ranked as the second-highest scoring male competitor representing Russia behind Vladimir Morozov.

==== Vladimir Salnikov Cup ====
At the 2021 Vladimir Salnikov Cup in December, Chupkov won the short course 200 metre breaststroke with a time of 2:03.67.

=== 2022–2023: Double ban for being Russian ===
In March 2022, following the 2022 Russian invasion of Ukraine the month before, Chupkov and his fellow Russians were banned from all LEN competitions indefinitely. The next month, he and the fellow Russians were further banned, this time by FINA from all of their competitions through the end of 2022. These bans prevented him from regaining his world record in the long course 200 metre breaststroke the same year, at the 2022 World Aquatics Championships or the 2022 European Aquatics Championships, after it was broken in May 2022 by Zac Stubblety-Cook of Australia. Additionally, times swum at other competitions were banned from counting towards world rankings and world and European records, so even if he had achieved a new world record time it would not have counted as a new world record. The FINA (since rebranded as World Aquatics) ban was back-actingly extended in April 2023.

== International championships (50 m) ==
Meet	50 breaststroke	100 breaststroke	200 breaststroke	4×100 freestyle	4×100 medley	4×100 mixed medley
Junior level
EJC 2014	3rd place, bronze medalist(s)	3rd place, bronze medalist(s)	2nd place, silver medalist(s)			
YOG 2014	3rd place, bronze medalist(s)	1st place, gold medalist(s)	3rd place, bronze medalist(s)	4th	1st place, gold medalist(s)	2nd place, silver medalist(s)
EG 2015	6th	1st place, gold medalist(s)	1st place, gold medalist(s)		1st place, gold medalist(s)	1st place, gold medalist(s)
WJC 2015	7th	1st place, gold medalist(s)	1st place, gold medalist(s)		1st place, gold medalist(s)	1st place, gold medalist(s)
Senior level
WC 2015			7th			
OG 2016			3rd place, bronze medalist(s)		4th	
WC 2017			1st place, gold medalist(s)		(bronze) ^{[a]}	
EC 2018		3rd place, bronze medalist(s)	1st place, gold medalist(s)		2nd place, silver medalist(s)	
WC 2019		8th	1st place, gold medalist(s)		(bronze) ^{[a]}	
MWG 2019		1st place, gold medalist(s)	1st place, gold medalist(s)		1st place, gold medalist(s)	
EC 2020		10th	1st place, gold medalist(s)		6th^{[a]}	
OG 2020		16th	4th		(bronze) ^{[a]}	

^{a} Chupkov swam only in the preliminaries.

== International championships (25 m) ==
Meet	100 breaststroke	200 breaststroke
EC 2015	8th	4th

== Personal best times ==
=== Long course metres (50 m pool) ===
Event	Time	Meet	Location	Date	Notes	Ref
100 m breaststroke	58.83	2020 Russian Championships	Kazan	26 October 2020	NR	
200 m breaststroke	2:06.12	2019 World Aquatics Championships	Gwangju, South Korea	26 July 2019	ER, NR, Former WR	

Legend: WR – World record; ER – European record; NR – Russian record; e – equalled existing record;
Records not set in finals: h – heat; sf – semifinal; r – relay 1st leg; rh – relay heat 1st leg; b – B final; † – en route to final mark; so – swim-off; tt – time trial

=== Short course metres (25 m pool) ===
Event	Time	Meet	Location	Date	Ref
100 m breaststroke	56.69	2018 Swimming World Cup	Singapore	15 November 2018	
200 m breaststroke	2:01.57	2018 Swimming World Cup	Tokyo, Japan	11 November 2018	

== Swimming World Cup circuits ==
The following medals Chupkov has won at Swimming World Cup circuits.

Edition	Gold medals	Silver medals	Bronze medals	Total
2017	0	0	3	3
2018	4	7	1	12
2019	4	0	1	5
2021	0	0	4	4
Total	8	7	9	24

== World records ==
=== Long course metres (50 m pool) ===
No.	Event	Time	Meet	Location	Date	Age	Status	Notes	Ref
1	200 m breaststroke	2:06.12	2019 World Aquatics Championships	Gwangju, South Korea	26 July 2019	22	Former	ER, NR	

Legend: WR – World record; ER – European record; NR – Russian record; e – equalled existing record;
Records not set in finals: h – heat; sf – semifinal; r – relay 1st leg; rh – relay heat 1st leg; b – B final; † – en route to final mark; so – swim-off; tt – time trial

== Continental and national records ==
=== Long course metres (50 m pool) ===
No.	Event	Time		Meet	Location	Date	Type	Status	Notes	Ref
1	200 m breaststroke	2:08.53		2016 Mare Nostrum	Canet-en-Roussillon, France	9 June 2016	NR	Former		
2	200 m breaststroke (2)	2:07.93	h	2016 Summer Olympics	Rio de Janeiro, Brazil	9 August 2016	NR	Former		
3	200 m breaststroke (3)	2:07.70		2016 Summer Olympics	Rio de Janeiro, Brazil	10 August 2016	NR	Former		
4	100 m breaststroke	59.39		2017 Mare Nostrum	Barcelona, Spain	13 June 2017	NR	Former		
5	200 m breaststroke (4)	2:07.46		2017 Mare Nostrum	Canet-en-Roussillon, France	18 June 2017	NR	Former		
6	200 m breaststroke (5)	2:07.14	sf	2017 World Aquatics Championships	Budapest, Hungary	27 July 2017	ER, NR	Former		
7	200 m breaststroke (6)	2:06.96		2017 World Aquatics Championships	Budapest, Hungary	28 July 2017	ER, NR	Former		
8	200 m breaststroke (7)	2:06.80		2018 European Aquatics Championships	Glasgow, Scotland	6 August 2018	ER, NR	Former		
9	200 m breaststroke (8)	2:06.12		2019 World Aquatics Championships	Gwangju, South Korea	26 July 2019	ER, NR	Current	Former WR	
10	100 m breaststroke (2)	58.94		2019 Swimming World Cup	Kazan	1 November 2019	NR	Former		
11	100 m breaststroke (3)	58.83		2020 Russian Championships	Kazan	26 October 2020	NR	Current		

Legend: WR – World record; ER – European record; NR – Russian record; e – equalled existing record;
Records not set in finals: h – heat; sf – semifinal; r – relay 1st leg; rh – relay heat 1st leg; b – B final; † – en route to final mark; so – swim-off; tt – time trial

== See also ==
- List of World Aquatics Championships medalists in swimming (men)
- World record progression 200 metres breaststroke

Records
Preceded by (Japan) Ippei Watanabe with (Australia) Matthew Wilson	Men's 200-metre breaststroke world record holder (long course); 26 July 2019 – 19 May 2022	Succeeded by (Australia) Zac Stubblety-Cook
