= Ilya Khomenko =

Russian swimmer (born 1995)

Personal information
- National team: Russia
- Born: 14 October 1995 (age 30)

Sport
- Sport: Swimming
- Strokes: Breaststroke
Medal record
Men's swimming
Representing Russia
European Championships (LC)
Silver medal – second place	2018 Glasgow	4×100 m mixed medley
World Junior Championships
Gold medal – first place	2013 Dubai	100 m breaststroke
European Junior Championships
Bronze medal – third place	2013 Poznań	100 m breaststroke

Ilya Khomenko (born 14 October 1995) is a Russian competitive swimmer who specializes in breaststroke.

In 2013 he became world junior champion in the 100 meter breaststroke in a new championships record.

He qualified for the 2016 Summer Olympics in Rio de Janeiro in the 200 meter breaststroke. He swam the 4th time in the heats and qualified for the semifinals, where he finished 10th overall.
