= Tobias Bjerg =

Danish swimmer (born 1998)

Personal information
- Full name: Tobias Brønnum Bjerg
- Nationality: Danish
- Born: 21 April 1998 (age 28)

Sport
- Sport: Swimming
Medal record
European Championships (SC)
Bronze medal – third place	2019 Glasgow	4×50 m mixed medley
European Games
Bronze medal – third place	2015 Baku	50 m breaststroke

Tobias Brønnum Bjerg (born 21 April 1998) is a Danish swimmer. He competed in the men's 50 metre breaststroke at the 2019 World Aquatics Championships.
