= Luca Pizzini =

Italian swimmer (born 1989)

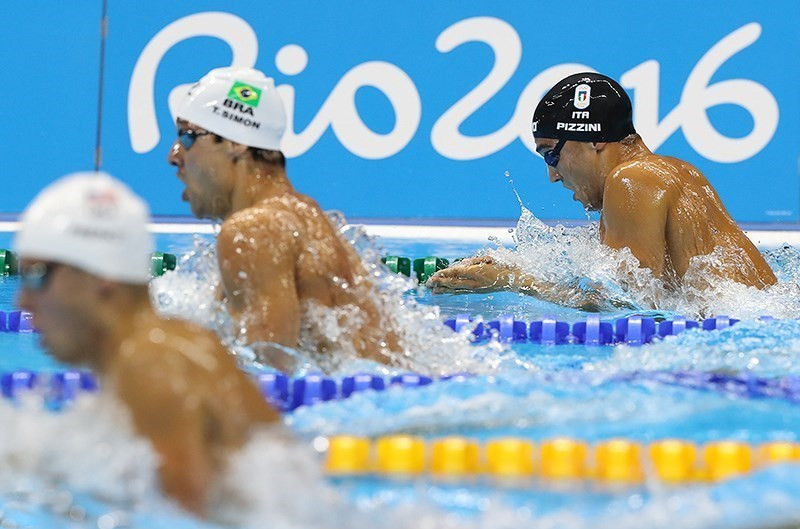
- Luca Pizzini (right) at the Rio 2016 Olympics.

Personal information
- Nationality: Italian
- Born: 8 April 1989 (age 37) Verona, Veneto, Italy
- Height: 1.85 m (6 ft 1 in)
- Weight: 76 kg (168 lb)

Sport
- Sport: Swimming
- Strokes: Breaststroke
- Club: CS Carabinieri
Medal record
Men's swimming
Representing Italy
European Championships (LC)
Bronze medal – third place	2016 London	200 m breaststroke
Bronze medal – third place	2018 Glasgow	200 m breaststroke
Bronze medal – third place	2022 Rome	200 m breaststroke
Summer Universiade
Bronze medal – third place	2013 Kazan	200 m breaststroke

Luca Pizzini (born 8 April 1989) is an Italian swimmer specialized in breaststroke. A junior medallist at both European and World Championships, he earned bronze medals in the 2013 Summer Universiade and the 2016 European Aquatics Championships. He also competed in the men's 200 metre breaststroke event at the 2016 Summer Olympics.

At the 2022 European Aquatics Championships, contested in August at Foro Italico in Rome, Pizzini won the bronze medal in the 200 metre breaststroke with a time of 2:09.97.
