= Dmytro Oseledets =

Ukrainian swimmer

Personal information
- Born: 23 November 1994 (age 31)

Sport
- Sport: Swimming

Dmytro Oseledets (born 23 November 1994) is a Ukrainian swimmer. He competed in the men's 200 metre breaststroke event at the 2016 Summer Olympics.
