= Basten Caerts =

Belgian swimmer

Personal information
- Born: 27 October 1997 (age 28) Hasselt, Belgium
- Height: 1.85 m (6 ft 1 in)
- Weight: 65 kg (143 lb)

Sport
- Sport: Swimming

Basten Caerts (born 27 October 1997) is a Belgian swimmer. He competed in the men's 200 metre breaststroke event at the 2016 Summer Olympics.
