= Arno Kamminga =

Dutch swimmer (born 1995)

Personal information
- Born: 22 October 1995 (age 30) Katwijk, Netherlands
- Height: 1.84 m (6 ft 0 in)
- Weight: 80 kg (176 lb)

Sport
- Sport: Swimming
- Strokes: Breaststroke
- Club: De Dolfijn
- Coach: Mark Faber
Medal record
Men's swimming
Representing the Netherlands
Olympic Games
Silver medal – second place	2020 Tokyo	100 m breaststroke
Silver medal – second place	2020 Tokyo	200 m breaststroke
World Championships (LC)
Silver medal – second place	2022 Budapest	100 m breaststroke
Silver medal – second place	2023 Fukuoka	100 m breaststroke
Silver medal – second place	2024 Doha	4×100 m medley
Bronze medal – third place	2022 Budapest	4×100 m mixed medley
World Championships (SC)
Gold medal – first place	2021 Abu Dhabi	4×50 m mixed medley
Silver medal – second place	2021 Abu Dhabi	200 m breaststroke
European Championships (LC)
Gold medal – first place	2022 Rome	4×100 m mixed medley
Silver medal – second place	2020 Budapest	100 m breaststroke
Silver medal – second place	2020 Budapest	200 m breaststroke
Silver medal – second place	2020 Budapest	4×100 m mixed medley
European Championships (SC)
Gold medal – first place	2017 Copenhagen	4×50 m mixed medley
Gold medal – first place	2019 Glasgow	100 m breaststroke
Gold medal – first place	2019 Glasgow	200 m breaststroke
Gold medal – first place	2021 Kazan	4x50 m mixed medley
Silver medal – second place	2019 Glasgow	4×50 m mixed medley
Silver medal – second place	2021 Kazan	200 m breaststroke
Bronze medal – third place	2019 Glasgow	50 m breaststroke
Bronze medal – third place	2021 Kazan	100 m breaststroke
Bronze medal – third place	2021 Kazan	4x50 m medley

Arno Kamminga (born 22 October 1995) is a Dutch swimmer. He won silver medals in the 100 metre breaststroke and 200 metre breaststroke events at the 2020 Summer Olympics.

He made his international debut in the men's 50 metre breaststroke event at the 2017 World Aquatics Championships. Kamminga is a two times world silver medaillist (2022, 2023) in the 100 metre breaststroke and won several other medals at the World and European Championships (long course and short course),

While competing in the 2024 Summer Olympics, Kamminga generated controversy by wearing multicolor swim trunks that gave the appearance of being partially see-through in some areas. Due to an injury he withdrew for the semi-finals in the 200 metre breaststroke.

== Personal bests ==
Short course
Event	Time	Date	Location
50 m breaststroke	NR 25.84	4 December 2019	Glasgow
100 m breaststroke	NR 55.79	4 November 2021	Kazan
200 m breaststroke	NR 2:01.43	17 December 2020	Amsterdam

Long course
Event	Time	Date	Location
50 m breaststroke	NR 26.80	9 April 2021	Eindhoven
100 m breaststroke	NR 57.80	24 July 2021	Tokyo
200 m breaststroke	NR 2:06.85	4 December 2020	Rotterdam
