= Lyubomir Epitropov =

Bulgarian swimmer

Personal information
- Nationality: Bulgarian
- Born: 27 April 1999 (age 27) Veliko Tarnovo, Bulgaria

Sport
- Sport: Swimming
- College team: University of Tennessee
Medal record
Event	1st	2nd	3rd
European Championships (LC)	1	0	0
Total	1	0	0
Representing Bulgaria
European Championships (LC)
Gold medal – first place	2024 Belgrade	200m breaststroke

Lyubomir Epitropov (Bulgarian: Любомир Епитропов; born 27 April 1999) is a Bulgarian swimmer. He competed in the men's 100 metre breaststroke event at the 2018 FINA World Swimming Championships (25 m), in Hangzhou, China.

At the 2024 European Aquatics Championships in Belgrade Epitropov took part in the 200m Breaststroke and broke the Bulgarian national record to win Gold with the time 2:09.45, tying for first place with Swedish swimmer Erik Persson.
