= Marco Koch =

German swimmer

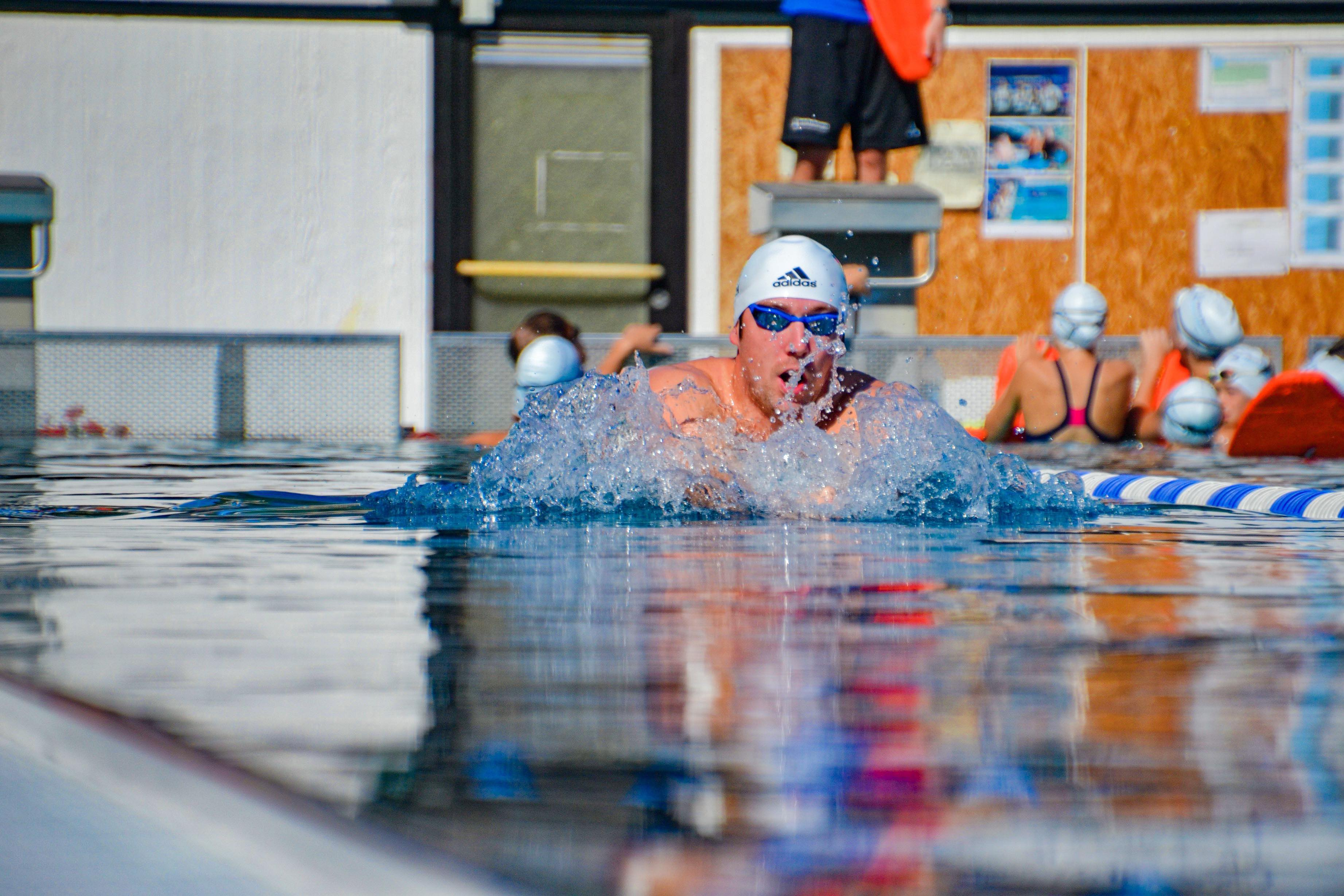
- Koch 2018 in Darmstadt, Germany

Personal information
- National team: Germany
- Born: 25 January 1990 (age 36) Darmstadt, West Germany
- Height: 1.85 m (6 ft 1 in)
- Weight: 83 kg (183 lb)

Sport
- Sport: Swimming
- Strokes: Breaststroke, individual medley
- Club: SG Frankfurt
- Coach: Dirk Lange, Shila Sheth
Medal record
Men's swimming
Representing Germany
World Championships (LC)
Gold medal – first place	2015 Kazan	200 m breaststroke
Silver medal – second place	2013 Barcelona	200 m breaststroke
World Championships (SC)
Gold medal – first place	2016 Windsor	100 m breaststroke
Gold medal – first place	2016 Windsor	200 m breaststroke
Silver medal – second place	2014 Doha	200 m breaststroke
Bronze medal – third place	2018 Hangzhou	200 m breaststroke
European Championships (LC)
Gold medal – first place	2014 Berlin	200 m breaststroke
Silver medal – second place	2012 Debrecen	200 m breaststroke
Silver medal – second place	2016 London	200 m breaststroke
European Championships (SC)
Gold medal – first place	2010 Eindhoven	200 m breaststroke
Gold medal – first place	2015 Netanya	100 m breaststroke
Gold medal – first place	2015 Netanya	200 m breaststroke
Silver medal – second place	2008 Rijeka	4×50 m medley
Silver medal – second place	2013 Herning	100 m breaststroke
Silver medal – second place	2017 Copenhagen	200 m breaststroke
Bronze medal – third place	2013 Herning	200 m breaststroke
Bronze medal – third place	2019 Glasgow	200 m breaststroke

Marco Koch (born 25 January 1990) is a German competitive swimmer who specializes in breaststroke events. He is a former world record holder in the 200 meter breaststroke (short course).

== Career ==
At the 2012 Summer Olympics in London, he competed in the men's 200-meter breaststroke, finishing in 11th place overall in the heats and 7th in his semifinal (13th overall), failing to reach the final.

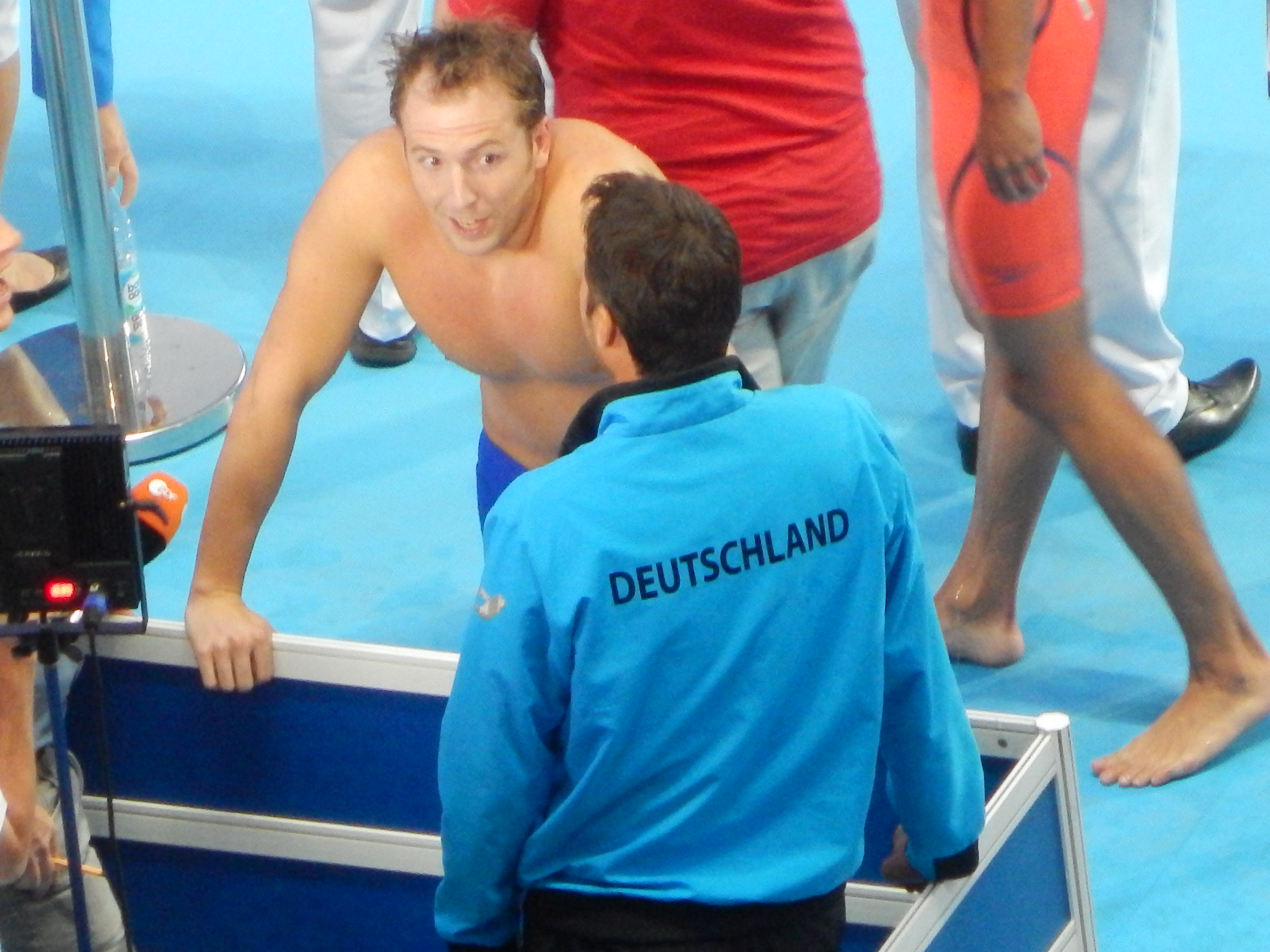
After golden final in Kazan

At the 2015 World Aquatics Championships in Kazan, Russia, he won the gold medal in the men's 200-meter breaststroke, becoming the first German to claim a championship title in that event.

At the 2016 Summer Olympics in Rio de Janeiro, he competed in the 200 m breaststroke. He finished in 7th place with a time of 2:08.00. He was also part of the 4 x 100 medley relay team which finished in 7th place.

In the Autumn of 2019 he was member of the inaugural International Swimming League swimming for the New York Breakers, who competed in the Americas Division. Koch competed at all of the meets for the Breakers, and specialized in the breaststroke events.

In the second ISL season he competed again for the NY Breakers winning in the play-offs four out four 200m breaststroke races with the highest jackpot ever - 30 points. In his third race in Budapest he almost broke the world record by swimming a 2:00,58.

Although he mainly specializes in breaststroke, Koch also holds the German record in the 400-meter individual medley (short course) with a time of 4:01.87.

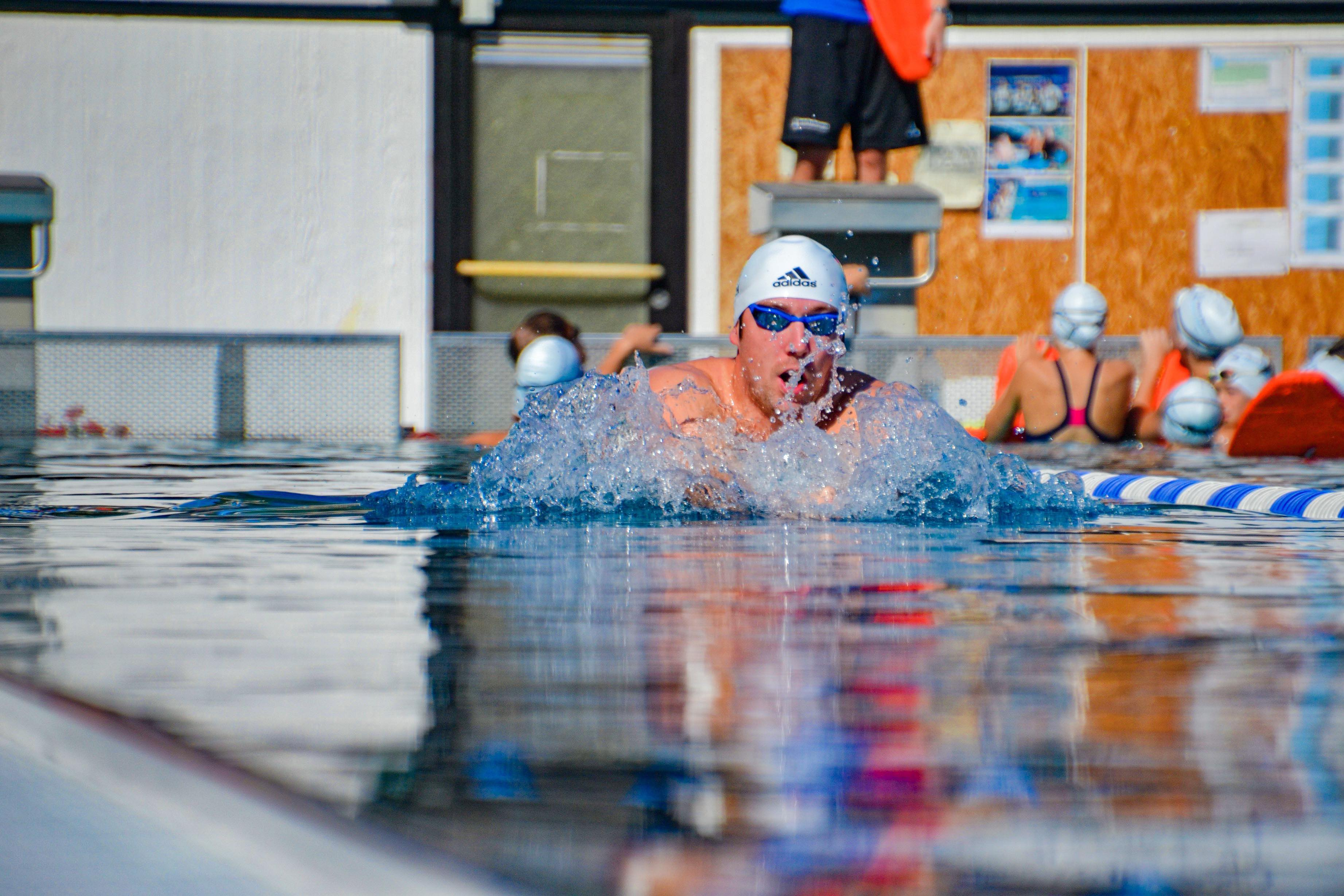
Marco Koch 2018 in Darmstadt, Germany

Records
Preceded by Dániel Gyurta	World record holder Men's 200 m breaststroke (short course); 20 November 2016 – Present	Succeeded by Incumbent
