= Dávid Horváth =

Hungarian swimmer (born 1996)

Personal information
- Nationality: Hungarian
- Born: 16 May 1996 (age 30) Budapest, Hungary

Sport
- Sport: Swimming
- Club: Kőbánya SC
Medal record
European Championships (SC)
Silver medal – second place	2019 Glasgow	4×50 m medley

Dávid Horváth (born 16 May 1996) is a Hungarian swimmer. He competed in the men's 200 metre breaststroke event at the 2016 Summer Olympics. In 2014, he represented Hungary at the 2014 Summer Youth Olympics held in Nanjing, China.

== Honours ==
Individual

- Nemzeti Bajnokság I Coach of the Month: September 2025
