= Martin Allikvee =

Estonian swimmer (born 1995)

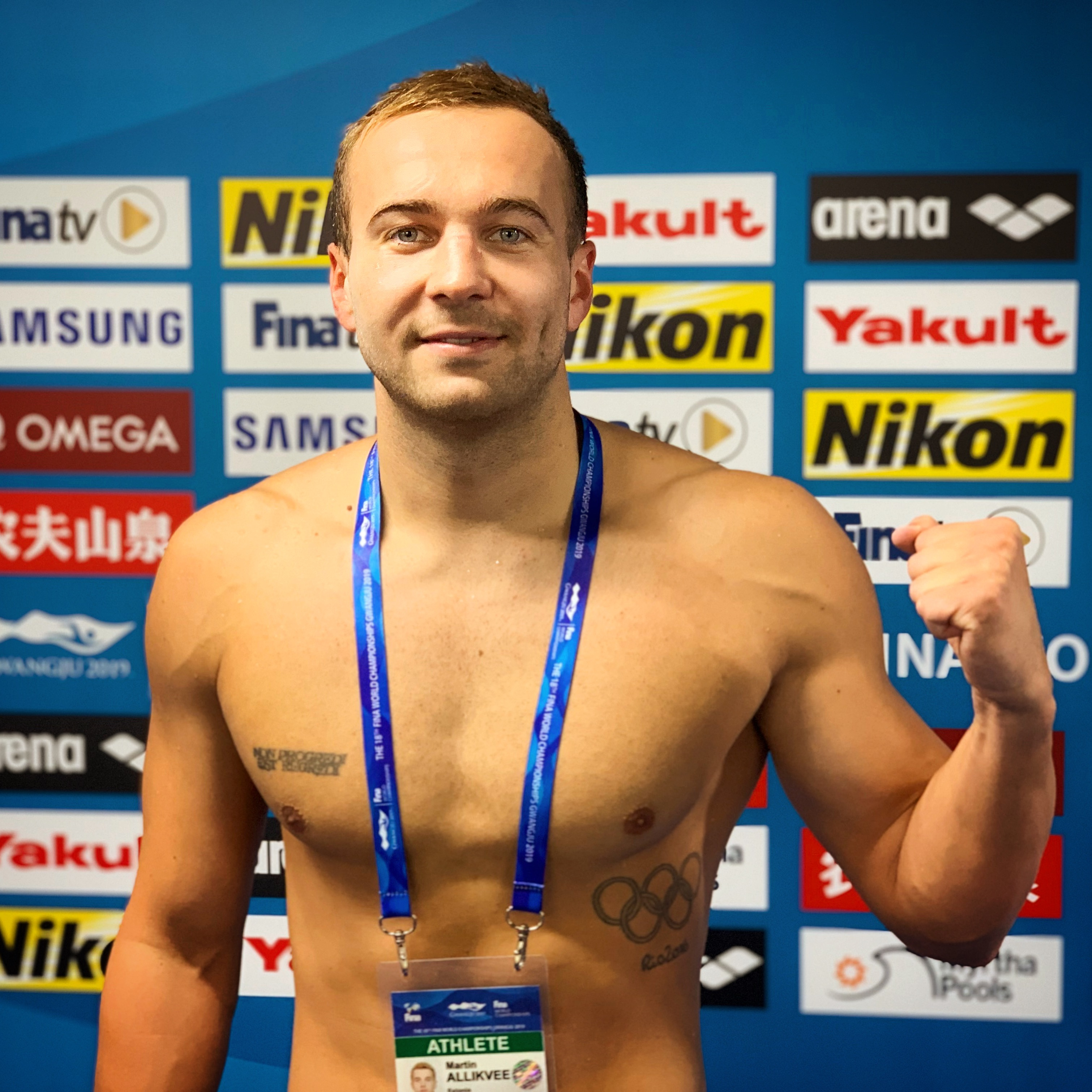
- Martin Allikvee in 2019

Personal information
- Nationality: Estonia
- Born: 21 March 1995 (age 31) Tallinn, Estonia
- Height: 182 cm (6 ft 0 in)
- Weight: 81 kg (179 lb)

Sport
- Sport: Swimming

Martin Allikvee (born 21 March 1995) is an Estonian swimmer. He is a two-times Olympian, a multiple-time Estonian record holder in the men's breaststroke. He competed in the men's 200 metre breaststroke event at the 2016 Summer Olympics. He is 18-time long course and 25-time short course Estonian swimming champion. He has broken 9 Estonian records in swimming.

Announced the end of his sports career in 2021. 60 times Estonian champion, 17 Estonian records. Two times Olympic Swimmer - (2016 Rio de Janeiro and 2020 Tokyo) Two-times finalist of the European Championship: (2017 and 2019) Multiple participant of the world championships (2014–2020)

== See also ==
- List of Estonian records in swimming
