= Erik Persson (swimmer) =

Swedish swimmer (born 1994)

Personal information
- Born: 12 January 1994 (age 32) Kungsbacka, Sweden
- Height: 1.81 m (5 ft 11 in)
- Weight: 75 kg (165 lb)

Sport
- Sport: Swimming
Medal record
World Championships (LC)
Silver medal – second place	2022 Budapest	200 m breaststroke
European Championships (LC)
Bronze medal – third place	2020 Budapest	200 m breaststroke
Gold medal – first place	2024 Belgrade	200 m breaststroke
European Championships (SC)
Silver medal – second place	2019 Glasgow	200 m breaststroke

Erik Persson (born 12 January 1994) is a Swedish swimmer. He competed in the men's 100 metre breaststroke event at the 2016 Summer Olympics. He qualified to represent Sweden at the 2020 Summer Olympics and 2024 Summer Olympics in the men's 200 metre breaststroke event.
