= Andrius Šidlauskas (swimmer) =

Lithuanian swimmer (born 1997)

Personal information
- Nationality: Lithuania
- Born: April 6, 1997 (age 29) Panevėžys, Lithuania
- Height: 1.88 m (6 ft 2 in)
- Weight: 79 kg (174 lb)

Sport
- Sport: Swimming
- Strokes: Breaststroke
- Club: Panevėžio Žemyna
Medal record
Men's swimming
Representing Lithuania
Event	1st	2nd	3rd
European Championships (LC)	0	0	2
World University Games	0	0	1
World Junior Championships	1	0	1
European Games	1	1	0
Total	2	1	4
European Championships (LC)
Bronze medal – third place	2022 Rome	100 m breaststroke
Bronze medal – third place	2024 Belgrade	100 m breaststroke
World University Games
Bronze medal – third place	2021 Chengdu	100 m breaststroke
European Games
Gold medal – first place	2015 Baku	50 m breaststroke
Silver medal – second place	2015 Baku	100 m breaststroke
World Junior Championships
Gold medal – first place	2015 Singapore	50 m breaststroke
Bronze medal – third place	2015 Singapore	100 m breaststroke
Baltic States Championships
Gold medal – first place	2021 Klaipėda	200 m breastroke
Gold medal – first place	2021 Klaipėda	4×100 m medley

Andrius Šidlauskas (born 6 April 1997) is a Lithuanian breaststroke swimmer.

In 2015 Šidlauskas won gold and bronze in 2015 FINA World Junior Swimming Championships. In 2066 he qualified for the 2016 Summer Olympics.

In 2019, he represented Lithuania at the 2019 World Aquatics Championships held in Gwangju, South Korea.

== 2023 season ==
=== 2021 Summer World University Games ===
At the 2021 Summer World University Games in Chengdu, China, Šidlauskas will compete in three events: the 50 m breaststroke, 100 m breaststroke, and 200 m breaststroke.

In his first event, 100 m breaststroke, Šidlauskas achieved the bronze medal, with a time of 59.89, but narrowly missed out on the silver medal by three-hundredths of a second (0.03) behind Poland's Jan Kulakowski.

== International championships (50 m) ==
Meet	50 breast	100 breast	200 breast	200 medley	4×100 medley
EC 2014		20th	34th		5th
OG 2016	—N/a	23rd			
WC 2017		6th		28th	17th
EC 2018	22nd	6th	6th		4th
WC 2019		14th	20th	30th	11th
EC 2020	26th	6th	10th		9th
OG 2020	—N/a	13th	16th		15th^{[a]}
WC 2022	14th	8th	20th		19th^{[a]}
EC 2022	12th	3rd place, bronze medalist(s)	5th		11th

^{a} Team Lithuania was disqualified in the heats
