= Christopher Rothbauer =

Austrian swimmer (born 1998)

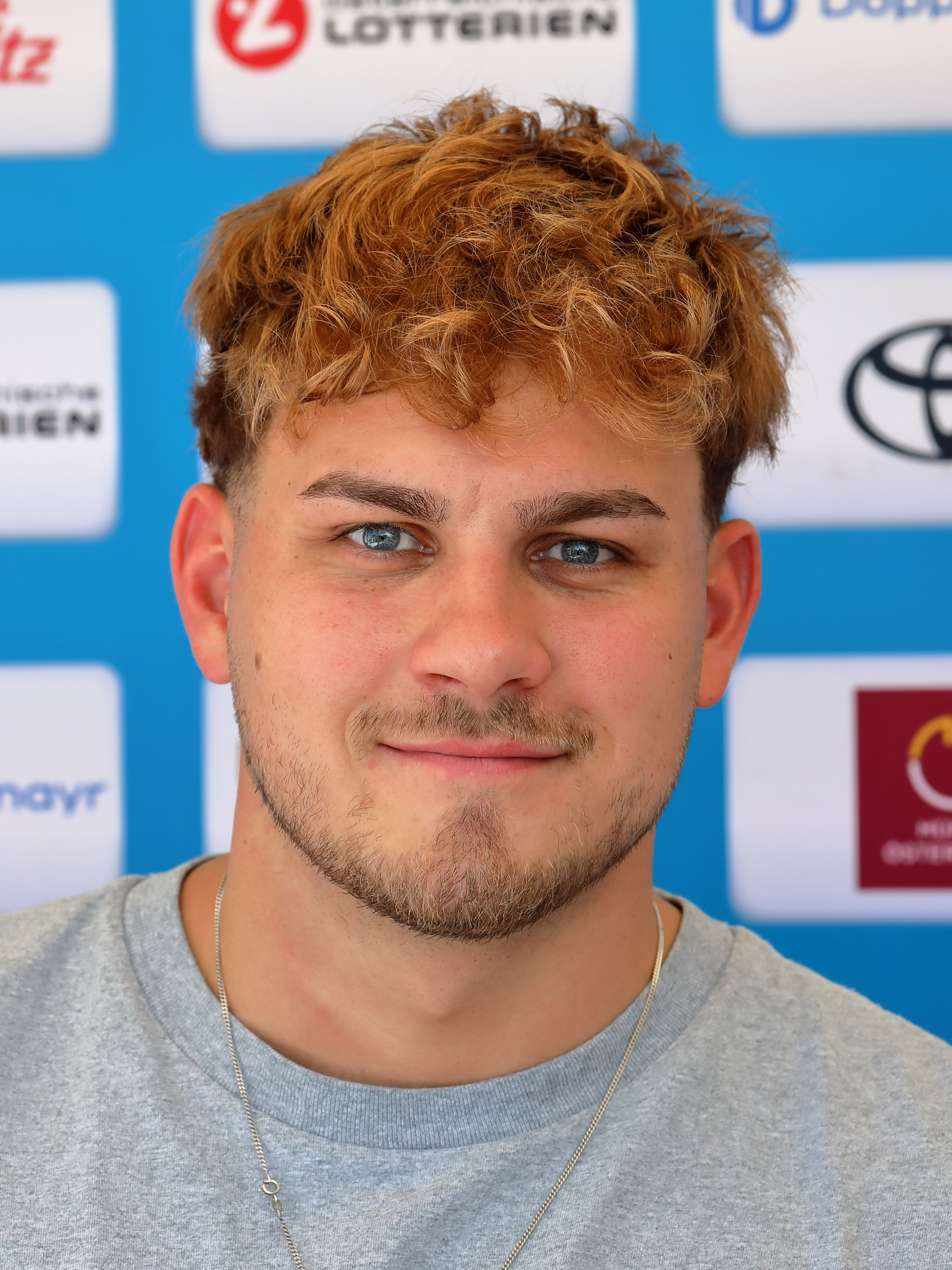

Personal information
- Nationality: Austrian
- Born: 29 January 1998 (age 28)

Sport
- Sport: Swimming
- Strokes: Breaststroke

Christopher Rothbauer (born 29 January 1998) is an Austrian swimmer. He competed in the men's 100 metre breaststroke event at the 2017 World Aquatics Championships. In April 2021, Rothbauer qualified to represent Austria at the 2020 Summer Olympics in Tokyo, where he went on to compete in the 200 m breaststroke.
