= Swimming at the 2016 European Aquatics Championships – Men's 100 metre breaststroke =

Men's 100 metre breaststroke at the 2016 European Aquatics Championships
- Dates: 16–17 May
- Competitors: 62 from 33 nations
- Winning time: 58.36

Medalists
gold medal	Adam Peaty	Great Britain
silver medal	Ross Murdoch	Great Britain
bronze medal	Giedrius Titenis	Lithuania

The Men's 100 metre breaststroke competition of the 2016 European Aquatics Championships was held on 16 and 17 May 2016.

== Records ==
Prior to the competition, the existing world, European and championship records were as follows.

	Name	Nation	Time	Location	Date
World record	Adam Peaty	Great Britain	57.92	London	17 April 2015
European record	Adam Peaty	Great Britain	57.92	London	17 April 2015
Championship record	Adam Peaty	Great Britain	58.68	Berlin	18 August 2014

== Results ==
=== Heats ===
The heats were held on 16 May at 11:11.

Rank	Heat	Lane	Name	Nationality	Time	Notes
1	7	4	Adam Peaty	Great Britain	58.94	Q
2	5	4	Ross Murdoch	Great Britain	59.91	Q
3	6	4	Giedrius Titenis	Lithuania	59.95	Q
4	6	3	Damir Dugonjič	Slovenia	1:00.33	Q
5	7	2	Andrea Toniato	Italy	1:00.41	Q
6	6	5	Craig Benson	Great Britain	1:00.63	
7	5	3	Anton Sveinn McKee	Iceland	1:00.79	Q
8	5	5	Panagiotis Samilidis	Greece	1:00.86	Q
9	6	2	Fabio Scozzoli	Italy	1:01.13	Q
10	6	8	Peter Stevens	Slovenia	1:01.27	Q
11	7	3	Giacomo Perez-Dortona	France	1:01.29	Q
12	6	1	Valeriy Dymo	Ukraine	1:01.30	Q
13	7	5	Čaba Silađi	Serbia	1:01.44	Q
14	7	1	Matti Mattsson	Finland	1:01.49	Q
15	6	0	Gábor Financsek	Hungary	1:01.51	Q
16	6	6	Charlie Attwood	Great Britain	1:01.56	
17	4	4	Johannes Dietrich	Austria	1:01.57	Q
18	7	6	Yannick Käser	Switzerland	1:01.59	Q
19	4	0	Martin Allikvee	Estonia	1:01.60	
20	5	6	Andrius Šidlauskas	Lithuania	1:01.65	
20	6	7	Erik Persson	Sweden	1:01.65	
22	5	2	Nicholas Quinn	Ireland	1:01.69	
23	3	1	Luchezar Shumkov	Bulgaria	1:01.83	
24	7	0	Johannes Skagius	Sweden	1:01.84	
25	5	7	Théo Bussiere	France	1:01.85	
26	4	7	Dávid Horváth	Hungary	1:02.04	
27	4	2	Martin Liivamägi	Estonia	1:02.05	
28	4	3	Demir Atasoy	Turkey	1:02.06	
29	7	7	Alexander Murphy	Ireland	1:02.15	
30	7	8	Dmytro Oseledets	Ukraine	1:02.22	
31	2	4	Petr Bartůněk	Czech Republic	1:02.23	
31	5	1	Mikhail Dorinov	Russia	1:02.23	
33	4	8	Kristijan Tomić	Croatia	1:02.26	
34	7	9	Jonas Coreelman	Belgium	1:02.33	
35	3	0	Marek Botík	Slovakia	1:02.57	
36	3	5	Yaron Shagalov	Israel	1:02.59	
37	3	4	Iliy Gladishev	Israel	1:02.64	
38	2	7	Sami Aaltomaa	Finland	1:02.65	
39	6	9	Max Pilger	Germany	1:02.66	
40	5	9	Martti Aljand	Estonia	1:02.67	
41	5	0	Sverre Næss	Norway	1:02.71	
42	3	8	Daniils Bobrovs	Latvia	1:02.86	
43	2	5	Christopher Rothbauer	Austria	1:02.89	
44	4	6	Patrik Schwarzenbach	Switzerland	1:02.91	
45	4	5	Eduardo Solaeche	Spain	1:03.20	
46	2	3	Jakub Maly	Austria	1:03.23	
47	2	6	Gal Nevo	Israel	1:03.30	
48	1	4	Irakli Bolkvadze	Georgia	1:03.41	
49	2	2	Filipp Provorkov	Estonia	1:03.46	
49	3	3	Nikolajs Maskaļenko	Latvia	1:03.46	
51	3	9	Itay Goldfaden	Israel	1:03.47	
52	3	6	Martin Schweizer	Switzerland	1:03.49	
53	2	0	Marko Blaževski	Macedonia	1:03.57	
54	3	2	Jørgen Bråthen	Norway	1:03.73	
55	3	7	Jolann Bovey	Switzerland	1:03.75	
56	2	9	Christoph Meier	Liechtenstein	1:03.80	
57	2	1	Berkay Şendikici	Turkey	1:03.98	
58	1	5	Lyubomir Agov	Bulgaria	1:04.14	
59	4	1	Dan Sweeney	Ireland	1:04.76	
60	1	3	Markos Kalopsidiotis	Cyprus	1:04.79	
61	1	6	Deni Baholli	Albania	1:08.28	
	5	8	Dimitrios Koulouris	Greece	DSQ	
	2	8	Ari-Pekka Liukkonen	Finland	DNS	
	4	9	Alpkan Örnek	Turkey	DNS	

=== Semifinals ===
The semifinals were held on 16 May 18:44.

==== Semifinal 1 ====
Rank	Lane	Name	Nationality	Time	Notes
1	4	Ross Murdoch	Great Britain	59.67	Q
2	5	Damir Dugonjič	Slovenia	1:00.06	Q
3	3	Anton Sveinn McKee	Iceland	1:00.98	Q
4	8	Yannick Käser	Switzerland	1:01.13	Q
5	6	Fabio Scozzoli	Italy	1:01.14	
6	7	Čaba Silađi	Serbia	1:01.27	
7	1	Gábor Financsek	Hungary	1:01.46	
8	2	Giacomo Perez-Dortona	France	1:01.56	

==== Semifinal 2 ====
Rank	Lane	Name	Nationality	Time	Notes
1	4	Adam Peaty	Great Britain	58.74	Q
2	5	Giedrius Titenis	Lithuania	59.99	Q
3	3	Andrea Toniato	Italy	1:00.48	Q
4	6	Panagiotis Samilidis	Greece	1:00.59	Q
5	1	Matti Mattsson	Finland	1:01.32	
6	7	Valeriy Dymo	Ukraine	1:01.41	
7	2	Peter Stevens	Slovenia	1:01.53	
8	8	Johannes Dietrich	Austria	1:01.65	

=== Final ===
The final was held on 17 May 18:36.

Rank	Lane	Name	Nationality	Time	Notes
1st place, gold medalist(s)	4	Adam Peaty	Great Britain	58.36	CR
2nd place, silver medalist(s)	5	Ross Murdoch	Great Britain	59.73	
3rd place, bronze medalist(s)	3	Giedrius Titenis	Lithuania	1:00.10	
4	2	Andrea Toniato	Italy	1:00.42	
5	7	Panagiotis Samilidis	Greece	1:00.66	
6	6	Damir Dugonjič	Slovenia	1:00.75	
7	1	Anton Sveinn McKee	Iceland	1:01.29	
8	8	Yannick Käser	Switzerland	1:01.36	
