= Swimming at the 2014 European Aquatics Championships – Men's 100 metre breaststroke =

100 metre breaststroke at the Swimming at the 2014 European Aquatics Championships
- Dates: 18–19 August
- Competitors: 54 from 29 nations
- Winning time: 58.96

Medalists
| gold medal | Adam Peaty | Great Britain |
| silver medal | Ross Murdoch | Great Britain |
| bronze medal | Giedrius Titenis | Lithuania |

The 100 metre breaststroke competition of the 2014 European Aquatics Championships was held on 18–19 August.

== Records ==
Prior to the competition, the existing world, European and championship records were as follows.

| | Name | Nation | Time | Location | Date |
|---|---|---|---|---|---|
| World record | Cameron van der Burgh | South Africa | 58.46 | London | 29 July 2012 |
| European record | Hugues Duboscq | France | 58.64 | Rome | 27 July 2009 |
| Championship record | Alexander Dale Oen | Norway | 59.20 | Budapest | 10 August 2010 |

== Results ==
=== Heats ===
The heats were held at 10:47.

| Rank | Heat | Lane | Name | Nationality | Time | Notes |
|---|---|---|---|---|---|---|
| 1 | 6 | 4 | Adam Peaty | Great Britain | 59.97 | Q |
| 2 | 6 | 3 | Dániel Gyurta | Hungary | 1:00.13 | Q |
| 3 | 5 | 4 | Ross Murdoch | Great Britain | 1:00.16 | Q |
| 4 | 6 | 5 | Giedrius Titenis | Lithuania | 1:00.48 | Q |
| 5 | 6 | 1 | Andrew Willis | Great Britain | 1:00.88 | |
| 6 | 5 | 5 | Hendrik Feldwehr | Germany | 1:00.89 | Q |
| 7 | 5 | 3 | Andrey Nikolaev | Russia | 1:00.90 | Q |
| 8 | 5 | 6 | Grigory Falko | Russia | 1:00.93 | Q |
| 9 | 6 | 6 | Giacomo Perez-Dortona | France | 1:00.94 | Q |
| 10 | 6 | 2 | Vsevolod Zanko | Russia | 1:01.06 | |
| 11 | 5 | 1 | Tomáš Klobučník | Slovakia | 1:01.12 | Q |
| 12 | 4 | 4 | Damir Dugonjič | Slovenia | 1:01.40 | Q |
| 13 | 5 | 2 | Laurent Carnol | Luxembourg | 1:01.43 | Q |
| 14 | 4 | 5 | Mattia Pesce | Italy | 1:01.44 | Q |
| 15 | 4 | 6 | Anton Lobanov | Russia | 1:01.49 | |
| 16 | 5 | 7 | Dmytro Oseledets | Ukraine | 1:01.59 | Q |
| 17 | 4 | 3 | Andrea Toniato | Italy | 1:01.68 | Q |
| 18 | 5 | 8 | Thomas Dahlia | France | 1:01.69 | Q |
| 19 | 3 | 7 | Sverre Naess | Norway | 1:01.73 | Q |
| 20 | 4 | 1 | Martti Aljand | Estonia | 1:01.75 | |
| 20 | 6 | 7 | Čaba Silađi | Serbia | 1:01.75 | |
| 22 | 4 | 7 | Luca Pizzini | Italy | 1:01.77 | |
| 23 | 6 | 9 | Martin Allikvee | Estonia | 1:01.80 | |
| 24 | 4 | 2 | Carlos Almeida | Portugal | 1:02.02 | |
| 25 | 3 | 5 | Erik Persson | Sweden | 1:02.05 | |
| 26 | 2 | 3 | Yaron Shagalov | Israel | 1:02.07 | |
| 27 | 3 | 8 | Martin Schweizer | Switzerland | 1:02.10 | |
| 28 | 2 | 4 | Nicholas Quinn | Ireland | 1:02.11 | |
| 29 | 2 | 7 | Barry Murphy | Ireland | 1:02.12 | |
| 30 | 3 | 3 | Martin Liivamägi | Estonia | 1:02.20 | |
| 31 | 4 | 8 | Eduardo Solaeche | Spain | 1:02.27 | |
| 32 | 3 | 2 | Melquíades Álvarez | Spain | 1:02.30 | |
| 33 | 6 | 8 | Bram Dekker | Netherlands | 1:02.42 | |
| 33 | 3 | 0 | Yannick Käser | Switzerland | 1:02.42 | |
| 35 | 5 | 9 | Ioannis Karpouzlis | Greece | 1:02.44 | |
| 35 | 3 | 4 | Valeriy Dymo | Ukraine | 1:02.44 | |
| 37 | 4 | 0 | Petr Bartůněk | Czech Republic | 1:02.48 | |
| 38 | 6 | 0 | Quentin Coton | France | 1:02.62 | |
| 39 | 3 | 1 | Matti Mattsson | Finland | 1:02.70 | |
| 40 | 2 | 2 | Dan Sweeney | Ireland | 1:02.79 | |
| 41 | 3 | 9 | Gal Nevo | Israel | 1:02.82 | |
| 42 | 3 | 6 | Igor Kozlovskij | Lithuania | 1:02.93 | |
| 43 | 1 | 5 | Jakub Maly | Austria | 1:03.11 | |
| 44 | 4 | 9 | Eetu Karvonen | Finland | 1:03.20 | |
| 45 | 2 | 5 | Nikolajs Maskalenko | Latvia | 1:03.25 | |
| 46 | 2 | 0 | Patrik Schwarzenbach | Switzerland | 1:03.40 | |
| 47 | 2 | 9 | Filipp Provorkov | Estonia | 1:03.63 | |
| 48 | 1 | 3 | Christoph Meier | Liechtenstein | 1:03.66 | |
| 49 | 5 | 0 | Mikolaj Machnik | Poland | 1:03.72 | |
| 50 | 2 | 8 | Ari-Pekka Liukkonen | Finland | 1:03.98 | |
| 51 | 2 | 1 | Marek Botík | Slovakia | 1:04.05 | |
| 52 | 2 | 6 | Antonin Svěcený | Czech Republic | 1:04.72 | |
| 53 | 1 | 4 | Heiko Gigler | Austria | 1:04.75 | |
| 54 | 1 | 6 | Ensar Hajder | Bosnia and Herzegovina | 1:06.13 | |

=== Semifinals ===
The Semifinals were held at 18:44.

==== Semifinal 1 ====
| Rank | Lane | Name | Nationality | Time | Notes |
|---|---|---|---|---|---|
| 1 | 5 | Giedrius Titenis | Lithuania | 59.35 | Q |
| 2 | 4 | Dániel Gyurta | Hungary | 59.58 | Q |
| 3 | 6 | Giacomo Perez-Dortona | France | 1:00.51 | Q |
| 4 | 2 | Damir Dugonjič | Slovenia | 1:00.87 | Q |
| 5 | 3 | Andrey Nikolaev | Russia | 1:00.89 | Q |
| 6 | 7 | Mattia Pesce | Italy | 1:01.01 | |
| 7 | 1 | Andrea Toniato | Italy | 1:01.10 | |
| 8 | 8 | Sverre Naess | Norway | 1:01.74 | |

==== Semifinal 2 ====
| Rank | Lane | Name | Nationality | Time | Notes |
|---|---|---|---|---|---|
| 1 | 4 | Adam Peaty | Great Britain | 58.68 | Q, CR |
| 2 | 5 | Ross Murdoch | Great Britain | 59.33 | Q |
| 3 | 3 | Hendrik Feldwehr | Germany | 1:01.00 | Q |
| 4 | 6 | Grigory Falko | Russia | 1:01.20 | |
| 5 | 2 | Tomáš Klobučník | Slovakia | 1:01.23 | |
| 6 | 8 | Thomas Dahlia | France | 1:01.53 | |
| 7 | 1 | Dmytro Oseledets | Ukraine | 1:01.76 | |
| 8 | 7 | Laurent Carnol | Luxembourg | 1:01.92 | |

=== Final ===
The final was held at 18:34.

| Rank | Lane | Name | Nationality | Time | Notes |
|---|---|---|---|---|---|
| 1st place, gold medalist(s) | 4 | Adam Peaty | Great Britain | 58.96 | |
| 2nd place, silver medalist(s) | 5 | Ross Murdoch | Great Britain | 59.43 | |
| 3rd place, bronze medalist(s) | 3 | Giedrius Titenis | Lithuania | 59.61 | |
| 4 | 6 | Dániel Gyurta | Hungary | 59.88 | |
| 5 | 2 | Giacomo Perez-Dortona | France | 1:00.38 | |
| 6 | 1 | Andrey Nikolaev | Russia | 1:00.71 | |
| 7 | 7 | Damir Dugonjič | Slovenia | 1:00.80 | |
| 8 | 8 | Hendrik Feldwehr | Germany | 1:01.02 | |
