= Swimming at the 2014 European Aquatics Championships – Men's 50 metre breaststroke =

Men's 50 metre breaststroke at the Swimming at the 2014 European Aquatics Championships
- Dates: 22–23 August
- Competitors: 45 from 26 nations
- Winning time: 27.00

Medalists
gold medal	Adam Peaty	Great Britain
silver medal	Giedrius Titenis	Lithuania
bronze medal	Damir Dugonjič	Slovenia

The Men's 50 metre breaststroke competition of the 2014 European Aquatics Championships was held on 22–23 August.

== Records ==
Prior to the competition, the existing world, European and championship records were as follows.

	Name	Nation	Time	Location	Date
World record	Cameron van der Burgh	South Africa	26.67	Rome	29 July 2009
European record	Adam Peaty	Great Britain	26.78	Glasgow	28 July 2014
Championship record	Oleg Lisogor	Ukraine	27.18	Berlin	2 August 2002

== Results ==
=== Heats ===
The heats were held at 10:24.

Rank	Heat	Lane	Name	Nationality	Time	Notes
1	5	4	Adam Peaty	Great Britain	26.91	Q, CR
2	3	4	Čaba Silađi	Serbia	27.25	Q
3	3	6	Giacomo Perez-Dortona	France	27.39	Q
4	5	5	Andrea Toniato	Italy	27.44	Q
5	4	4	Damir Dugonjič	Slovenia	27.55	Q
6	4	7	Petr Bartůněk	Czech Republic	27.63	Q
7	3	3	Andrey Nikolaev	Russia	27.64	Q
8	3	5	Hendrik Feldwehr	Germany	27.66	Q
8	4	3	Giedrius Titenis	Lithuania	27.66	Q
10	5	3	Mattia Pesce	Italy	27.74	Q
11	4	2	Yaron Shagalov	Israel	27.85	Q
12	5	2	Ioannis Karpouzlis	Greece	27.88	Q
13	3	7	Martin Schweizer	Switzerland	27.94	Q
14	5	6	Barry Murphy	Ireland	28.01	Q
15	3	2	Martti Aljand	Estonia	28.03	Q
16	3	1	Matjaž Markič	Slovenia	28.04	Q
17	4	0	Dániel Gyurta	Hungary	28.15	
18	5	0	Tomáš Klobučník	Slovakia	28.16	
19	4	6	Eetu Karvonen	Finland	28.17	
20	4	1	Vsevolod Zanko	Russia	28.18	
21	5	1	Marek Botík	Slovakia	28.26	
22	5	7	Nikolajs Maskalenko	Latvia	28.33	
23	4	8	Carlos Almeida	Portugal	28.37	
24	5	9	Grigory Falko	Russia	28.39	
25	4	9	Martin Allikvee	Estonia	28.40	
26	3	8	Matěj Kuchar	Slovakia	28.41	
27	2	4	Valeriy Dymo	Ukraine	28.48	
28	2	7	Yannick Käser	Switzerland	28.49	
29	1	8	Dmytro Oseledets	Ukraine	28.58	
30	2	2	Ari-Pekka Liukkonen	Finland	28.61	
31	2	3	Laurent Carnol	Luxembourg	28.78	
32	3	9	Bram Dekker	Netherlands	28.83	
33	2	6	Matti Mattsson	Finland	28.89	
34	2	5	Yahav Shahaff	Israel	28.96	
35	3	0	Filipp Provorkov	Estonia	29.04	
36	2	1	Nicholas Quinn	Ireland	29.07	
37	2	0	Sverre Næss	Norway	29.18	
38	2	9	Patrik Schwarzenbach	Switzerland	29.31	
39	1	4	Dan Sweeney	Ireland	29.49	
40	1	2	Martin Baďura	Czech Republic	29.67	
41	1	5	Antonin Svěcený	Czech Republic	29.68	
42	1	6	Lefkios Xanthou	Cyprus	29.82	
43	1	7	Dario Tunjić	Bosnia and Herzegovina	30.06	
44	1	3	Heiko Gigler	Austria	30.08	
45	1	1	Ensar Hajder	Bosnia and Herzegovina	30.10	
—	2	8	Erik Persson	Sweden		DNS
—	4	5	Ross Murdoch	Great Britain		DNS
—	5	8	Anton Lobanov	Russia		DNS

=== Semifinals ===
The semifinals were held at 19:26.

==== Semifinal 1 ====
Rank	Lane	Name	Nationality	Time	Notes
1	4	Čaba Silađi	Serbia	27.33	Q
2	5	Andrea Toniato	Italy	27.60	Q
3	6	Hendrik Feldwehr	Germany	27.70	Q
4	2	Mattia Pesce	Italy	27.78	
5	1	Barry Murphy	Ireland	27.90	
6	3	Petr Bartůněk	Czech Republic	27.91	
7	7	Ioannis Karpouzlis	Greece	28.08	
8	8	Matjaž Markič	Slovenia	28.16	

==== Semifinal 2 ====
Rank	Lane	Name	Nationality	Time	Notes
1	4	Adam Peaty	Great Britain	26.62	Q, WR
2	2	Giedrius Titenis	Lithuania	27.39	Q
3	3	Damir Dugonjič	Slovenia	27.40	Q
4	5	Giacomo Perez-Dortona	France	27.61	Q
5	6	Andrey Nikolaev	Russia	27.68	Q
6	7	Yaron Shagalov	Israel	27.83	
7	1	Martin Schweizer	Switzerland	27.87	
8	8	Martti Aljand	Estonia	28.18	

=== Final ===
The final was held at 17:30.

Rank	Lane	Name	Nationality	Time	Notes
1st place, gold medalist(s)	4	Adam Peaty	Great Britain	27.00	
2nd place, silver medalist(s)	3	Giedrius Titenis	Lithuania	27.34	
3rd place, bronze medalist(s)	6	Damir Dugonjič	Slovenia	27.48	
4	5	Čaba Silađi	Serbia	27.50	
5	1	Andrey Nikolaev	Russia	27.53	
5	2	Andrea Toniato	Italy	27.53	
7	7	Giacomo Perez-Dortona	France	27.54	
8	8	Hendrik Feldwehr	Germany	27.72	
