= Swimming at the 2016 Summer Olympics – Men's 100 metre breaststroke =

Men's 100 metre breaststroke at the Games of the XXXI Olympiad
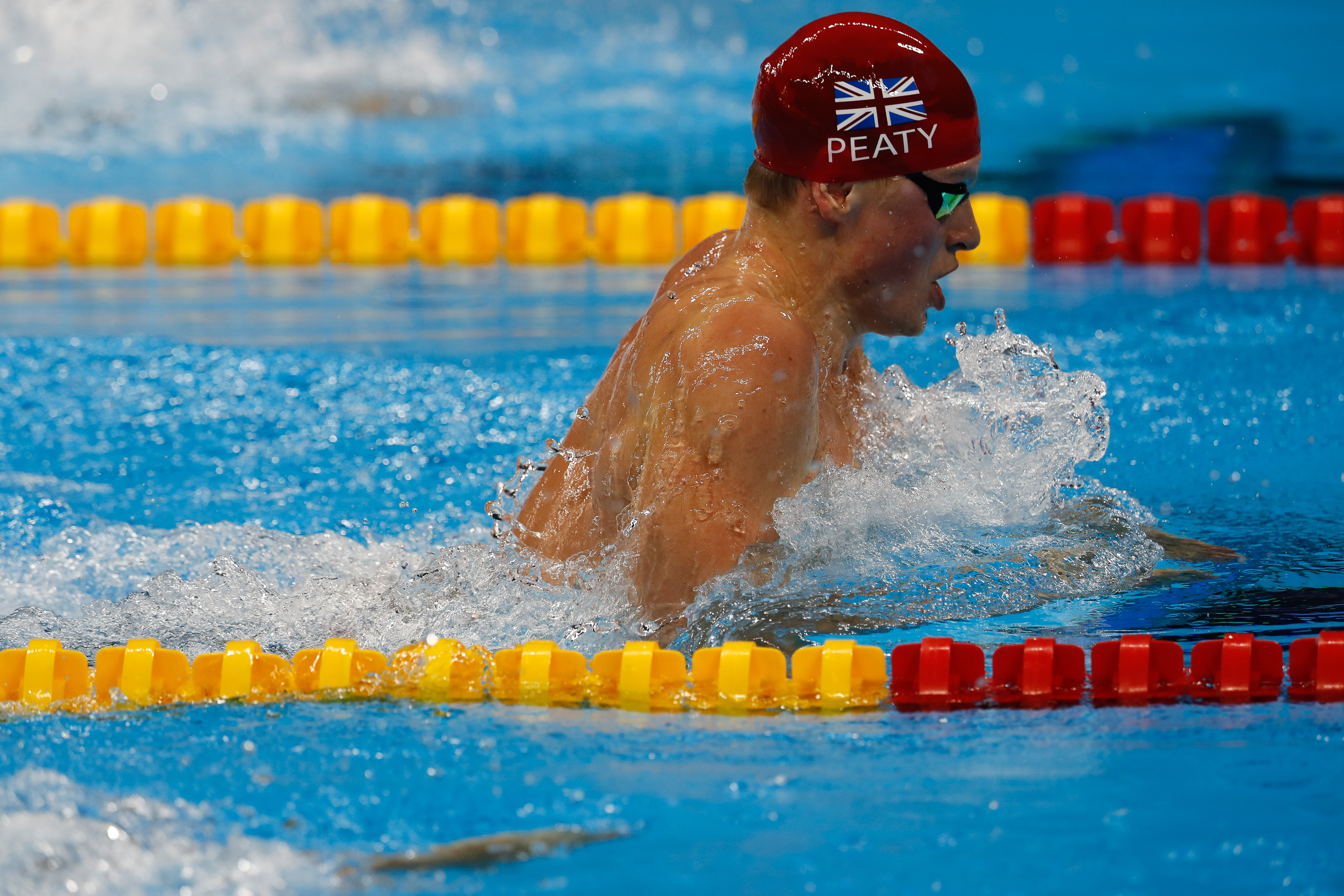
- Peaty on his way to a gold-medal finish
- Venue: Olympic Aquatics Stadium
- Dates: 6 August 2016 (heats & semifinals); 7 August 2016 (final)
- Competitors: 46 from 38 nations
- Winning time: 57.13 WR

Medalists
1st place, gold medalist(s)		Adam Peaty	Great Britain
2nd place, silver medalist(s)		Cameron van der Burgh	South Africa
3rd place, bronze medalist(s)		Cody Miller	United States

The men's 100 metre breaststroke event at the 2016 Summer Olympics took place between 6–7 August at the Olympic Aquatics Stadium.

The winning margin was 1.56 seconds which as of 2023 remains the only time this event for men was won by more than one second at the Olympics.

== Summary ==
Great Britain's Adam Peaty defeated the field with a new world record to become the country's third gold medalist in this event, since Duncan Goodhew topped the podium in 1980 and Adrian Moorhouse in 1988. He jumped to an immediate lead, and never looked back, charging ahead of the field with his trademark high stroke rate to lower his own world record at 57.13. Peaty's time also gave him the largest margin of victory in the event's Olympic history, sparing 1.56 seconds over South Africa's defending champion Cameron van der Burgh, who won a silver in 58.69. Meanwhile, U.S. swimmer Cody Miller overcame his rib condition to set a new American record of 58.87 for the bronze medal, edging out his teammate Kevin Cordes (59.22) to fourth by 0.35 of a second.

Backed by a raucous home crowd, Brazil's João Gomes Júnior managed to pull off a fifth-place finish in 59.31, almost a tenth-second margin ahead of Japan's Yasuhiro Koseki (59.37) and his countryman Felipe França Silva (59.38). Swimming on the outside lane, Kazakhstan's Dmitriy Balandin rounded out the final with an eighth-place time in 59.85. For the first time in Olympic history, all eight finalists finished the race in less than a minute.

Earlier in the prelims, Peaty established a new world-record time in 57.55 to lead all swimmers for the top seed, not only clipping 0.37 seconds off his own standard one year earlier, but also erasing van der Burgh's 2012 Olympic record by almost a second.

Notable swimmers missed the final roster, including Australia's Jake Packard, Peaty's teammate and 2015 world bronze medalist Ross Murdoch, Lithuania's Giedrius Titenis, and Hungary's Dániel Gyurta, who elected not to do the swimoff with New Zealand's Glenn Snyders (a matching 1:00.26) on the morning prelims.

The medals for the competition were presented by Sheikh Ahmed Al-Fahad Al-Ahmed Al-Sabah, Kuwait, IOC member, and the gifts were presented by Mr. Andrey Kryukov, Bureau Member of the FINA.

== Records ==
Prior to this competition, the existing world and Olympic records were as follows.

World record	Adam Peaty (GBR)	57.92	London, United Kingdom	17 April 2015
Olympic record	Cameron van der Burgh (RSA)	58.46	London, United Kingdom	29 July 2012

The following records were established during the competition:

Date	Event	Name	Nationality	Time	Record
6 August	Heat 6	Adam Peaty	Great Britain	57.55	WR
7 August	Final	Adam Peaty	Great Britain	57.13	WR

== Competition format ==
The competition consisted of three rounds: heats, semifinals, and a final. The swimmers with the best 16 times in the heats advanced to the semifinals. The swimmers with the best 8 times in the semifinals advanced to the final. Swim-offs were used as necessary to break ties for advancement to the next round.

== Results ==
=== Heats ===
Rank	Heat	Lane	Name	Nationality	Time	Notes
1	6	4	Adam Peaty	Great Britain	57.55	Q, WR
2	4	6	Yasuhiro Koseki	Japan	58.91	Q
3	5	3	Felipe França Silva	Brazil	59.01	Q, SA
4	4	4	Kevin Cordes	United States	59.13	Q
5	4	5	Cody Miller	United States	59.17	Q
6	6	6	Jake Packard	Australia	59.26	Q
7	5	4	Cameron van der Burgh	South Africa	59.35	Q
8	5	5	João Gomes Júnior	Brazil	59.46	Q
9	4	3	Dmitriy Balandin	Kazakhstan	59.47	Q
9	6	3	Ross Murdoch	Great Britain	59.47	Q
11	6	1	Li Xiang	China	59.55	Q
12	6	5	Giedrius Titenis	Lithuania	59.90	Q
13	6	2	Vsevolod Zanko	Russia	59.91	Q
14	3	5	Jorge Murillo	Colombia	59.93	Q NR
15	4	2	Christian vom Lehn	Germany	1:00.13	Q
16	4	7	Glenn Snyders	New Zealand	1:00.26	WSO
16	4	8	Dániel Gyurta	Hungary	1:00.26	LSO
18	5	1	Ippei Watanabe	Japan	1:00.33	
19	6	8	Panagiotis Samilidis	Greece	1:00.35	
20	5	6	Kirill Prigoda	Russia	1:00.37	
21	5	7	Damir Dugonjič	Slovenia	1:00.41	
22	5	8	Andrea Toniato	Italy	1:00.45	
23	3	3	Andrius Šidlauskas	Lithuania	1:00.59	
24	2	5	Yannick Käser	Switzerland	1:00.71	
24	3	7	Jason Block	Canada	1:00.71	
26	5	2	Čaba Silađi	Serbia	1:00.76	
27	3	8	Laurent Carnol	Luxembourg	1:00.88	
27	6	7	Yan Zibei	China	1:00.88	
29	4	1	Marcin Stolarski	Poland	1:01.06	
30	2	4	Carlos Claverie	Venezuela	1:01.13	
30	3	4	Joshua Palmer	Australia	1:01.13	
32	2	6	Erik Persson	Sweden	1:01.20	
33	2	3	Nicholas Quinn	Ireland	1:01.29	
34	3	1	Vladislav Mustafin	Uzbekistan	1:01.66	
35	3	6	Anton Sveinn McKee	Iceland	1:01.84	
36	2	2	Azad Al-Barazi	Syria	1:02.22	
37	1	5	Radomyos Matjiur	Thailand	1:02.36	
38	2	1	Matti Mattsson	Finland	1:02.45	
39	1	4	Martin Melconian	Uruguay	1:02.67	
40	1	3	Julian Fletcher	Bermuda	1:02.73	
41	2	7	Édgar Crespo	Panama	1:02.78	
42	3	2	Tomáš Klobučník	Slovakia	1:02.93	
43	1	2	Benjamin Schulte	Guam	1:03.29	
44	2	8	Dustin Tynes	Bahamas	1:03.71	
45	1	6	Amini Fonua	Tonga	1:06.40	
46	1	7	Corey Ollivierre	Grenada	1:08.68	

=== Semi-finals ===
==== Semifinal 1 ====
Rank	Lane	Name	Nationality	Time	Notes
1	4	Yasuhiro Koseki	Japan	59.23	Q
2	5	Kevin Cordes	United States	59.33	Q
3	6	João Gomes Júnior	Brazil	59.40	Q
4	3	Jake Packard	Australia	59.48	
5	7	Giedrius Titenis	Lithuania	59.80	
6	2	Ross Murdoch	Great Britain	1:00.05	
7	8	Glenn Snyders	New Zealand	1:00.50	
8	1	Jorge Murillo	Colombia	1:00.81	

==== Semifinal 2 ====
Rank	Lane	Name	Nationality	Time	Notes
1	4	Adam Peaty	Great Britain	57.62	Q
2	3	Cody Miller	United States	59.05	Q
3	6	Cameron van der Burgh	South Africa	59.21	Q
4	5	Felipe França Silva	Brazil	59.35	Q
5	2	Dmitriy Balandin	Kazakhstan	59.45	Q
6	8	Christian vom Lehn	Germany	1:00.23	
7	7	Li Xiang	China	1:00.25	
8	1	Vsevolod Zanko	Russia	1:00.39	

=== Final ===
Rank	Lane	Name	Nationality	Time	Notes
1st place, gold medalist(s)	4	Adam Peaty	Great Britain	57.13	WR
2nd place, silver medalist(s)	3	Cameron van der Burgh	South Africa	58.69	
3rd place, bronze medalist(s)	5	Cody Miller	United States	58.87	AM
4	2	Kevin Cordes	United States	59.22	
5	1	João Gomes Júnior	Brazil	59.31	
6	6	Yasuhiro Koseki	Japan	59.37	
7	7	Felipe França Silva	Brazil	59.38	
8	8	Dmitriy Balandin	Kazakhstan	59.85	
