= Swimming at the 2018 European Aquatics Championships – Men's 50 metre breaststroke =

Men's 50 metre breaststroke at the 2018 European Aquatics Championships
- Venue: Tollcross International Swimming Centre
- Dates: 7 August (heats and semifinals); 8 August (final)
- Competitors: 53 from 28 nations
- Winning time: 26.09

Medalists
gold medal	Adam Peaty	Great Britain
silver medal	Fabio Scozzoli	Italy
bronze medal	Peter John Stevens	Slovenia

The Men's 50 metre breaststroke competition of the 2018 European Aquatics Championships was held on 7 and 8 August 2018.

== Records ==
Prior to the competition, the existing world and championship records were as follows.

	Name	Nation	Time	Location	Date
World record European record	Adam Peaty	Great Britain	25.95	Budapest	25 July 2017
Championship record	Adam Peaty	Great Britain	26.62	Berlin	22 August 2014

The following new records were set during this competition.

Date	Event	Name	Nationality	Time	Record
7 August	Heat	Adam Peaty	Great Britain	26.50	CR
7 August	Semifinal	Adam Peaty	Great Britain	26.23	CR
8 August	Final	Adam Peaty	Great Britain	26.09	CR

== Results ==
=== Heats ===
The heats were started on 7 August at 09:14.

Rank	Heat	Lane	Name	Nationality	Time	Notes
1	6	4	Adam Peaty	Great Britain	26.50	Q, CR
2	5	4	Fabio Scozzoli	Italy	27.04	Q
3	6	5	Ilya Shymanovich	Belarus	27.09	Q
4	6	3	Čaba Silađi	Serbia	27.12	Q
5	5	5	Ties Elzerman	Netherlands	27.16	Q
6	5	3	Alessandro Pinzuti	Italy	27.17	Q
7	4	4	Kirill Prigoda	Russia	27.21	Q
7	6	6	Peter John Stevens	Slovenia	27.21	Q
9	3	3	Ross Murdoch	Great Britain	27.27	Q
9	4	5	Johannes Skagius	Sweden	27.27	Q
11	4	2	James Wilby	Great Britain	27.44	
12	6	2	Fabian Schwingenschlögl	Germany	27.49	Q
13	6	1	Nikola Obrovac	Croatia	27.62	Q
14	5	7	Darragh Greene	Ireland	27.66	Q
14	4	0	Bernhard Reitshammer	Austria	27.66	Q
16	4	6	Arno Kamminga	Netherlands	27.71	Q
17	6	8	Ioannis Karpouzlis	Greece	27.74	Q
18	6	7	Emre Sakçı	Turkey	27.76	
19	5	6	Giedrius Titenis	Lithuania	27.78	
20	5	2	Ilya Khomenko	Russia	27.79	
21	6	9	Tobias Bjerg	Denmark	27.84	
22	5	9	Andrius Šidlauskas	Lithuania	27.85	
23	5	8	Marek Botík	Slovakia	27.89	
23	4	3	Oleg Kostin	Russia	27.89	
25	6	0	Luca Pizzini	Italy	27.93	
26	4	9	Tomáš Klobučník	Slovakia	28.03	
27	4	7	Alex Murphy	Ireland	28.09	
27	3	6	Christopher Rothbauer	Austria	28.09	
29	3	4	Yannick Käser	Switzerland	28.28	
30	3	5	William Wihanto	Finland	28.30	
31	3	8	Valentin Bayer	Austria	28.33	
32	5	0	Lachezar Shumkov	Bulgaria	28.40	
33	2	5	Bartłomiej Roguski	Poland	28.43	
34	5	1	Itay Goldfaden	Israel	28.47	
35	2	6	Mikhail Dorinov	Russia	28.51	
36	3	2	Martin Allikvee	Estonia	28.54	
36	1	5	Ivan Strilets	Ukraine	28.54	
38	1	4	Mykyta Kopytelov	Ukraine	28.65	
39	3	7	Demir Atasoy	Turkey	28.69	
40	4	8	Ari-Pekka Liukkonen	Finland	28.71	
41	3	0	Filipp Provorkov	Estonia	28.77	
42	2	4	Berkay Öğretir	Turkey	28.90	
43	2	3	Teemu Vuorela	Finland	28.93	
44	2	2	Jozef Beňo	Slovakia	28.95	
45	2	7	Daniils Bobrovs	Latvia	28.99	
46	3	1	Dávid Horváth	Hungary	29.03	
47	1	6	Andri Aedma	Estonia	29.34	
48	2	8	Johannes Dietrich	Austria	29.49	
49	2	0	Lyubomir Epitropov	Bulgaria	29.63	
50	2	1	Oktaycan Emirbayer	Turkey	29.72	
51	3	9	Oleksandr Karpenko	Ukraine	29.79	
52	1	3	Michael Stafrace	Malta	30.03	
53	1	2	Deni Baholli	Albania	31.43	
	2	9	Jacques Laeuffer	Switzerland	Did not start	
	4	1	Marcin Stolarski	Poland	Did not start	

=== Semifinals ===
The semifinals were started on 7 August at 17:18.

==== Semifinal 1 ====
Rank	Lane	Name	Nationality	Time	Notes
1	4	Fabio Scozzoli	Italy	26.80	Q
2	5	Čaba Silađi	Serbia	26.99	Q, NR
3	6	Kirill Prigoda	Russia	27.17	Q
4	3	Alessandro Pinzuti	Italy	27.32	
5	2	Johannes Skagius	Sweden	27.39	
6	1	Darragh Greene	Ireland	27.44	
7	7	Nikola Obrovac	Croatia	27.75	
8	8	Ioannis Karpouzlis	Greece	27.97	

==== Semifinal 2 ====
Rank	Lane	Name	Nationality	Time	Notes
1	4	Adam Peaty	Great Britain	26.23	Q, CR
2	6	Peter John Stevens	Slovenia	27.08	Q
3	5	Ilya Shymanovich	Belarus	27.09	Q
4	3	Ties Elzerman	Netherlands	27.15	Q
5	7	Fabian Schwingenschlögl	Germany	27.16	Q
6	2	Ross Murdoch	Great Britain	27.39	
7	1	Bernhard Reitshammer	Austria	27.47	
8	8	Arno Kamminga	Netherlands	27.72	

=== Final ===
The final was started on 8 August at 16:48.

Rank	Lane	Name	Nationality	Time	Notes
1st place, gold medalist(s)	4	Adam Peaty	Great Britain	26.09	CR
2nd place, silver medalist(s)	5	Fabio Scozzoli	Italy	26.79	
3rd place, bronze medalist(s)	6	Peter John Stevens	Slovenia	27.06	
4	8	Kirill Prigoda	Russia	27.18	
5	3	Čaba Silađi	Serbia	27.20	
6	7	Ties Elzerman	Netherlands	27.24	
7	1	Fabian Schwingenschlögl	Germany	27.29	
8	2	Ilya Shymanovich	Belarus	27.32	
