= Swimming at the 2016 European Aquatics Championships – Men's 50 metre breaststroke =

Men's 50 metre breaststroke at the 2016 European Aquatics Championships
- Dates: 20–21 May
- Competitors: 49 from 30 nations
- Winning time: 26.66

Medalists
gold medal	Adam Peaty	Great Britain
silver medal	Peter John Stevens	Slovenia
bronze medal	Ross Murdoch	Great Britain

The Men's 50 metre breaststroke competition of the 2016 European Aquatics Championships was held on 20 and 21 May 2016.

== Records ==
Prior to the competition, the existing world, European and championship records were as follows.

	Name	Nation	Time	Location	Date
World record	Adam Peaty	Great Britain	26.42	Kazan	4 August 2015
European record	Adam Peaty	Great Britain	26.42	Kazan	4 August 2015
Championship record	Adam Peaty	Great Britain	26.62	Berlin	22 August 2014

== Results ==
=== Heats ===
The heats were held on 20 May at 11:07.

Rank	Heat	Lane	Name	Nationality	Time	Notes
1	6	4	Adam Peaty	Great Britain	26.93	Q
2	5	3	Peter John Stevens	Slovenia	27.32	Q
3	4	4	Andrea Toniato	Italy	27.37	Q
4	4	5	Damir Dugonjič	Slovenia	27.49	Q
5	6	5	Čaba Silađi	Serbia	27.54	Q
6	6	6	Ross Murdoch	Great Britain	27.57	Q
7	4	4	Panagiotis Samilidis	Greece	27.72	Q
8	4	6	Sami Aaltomaa	Finland	27.73	Q
9	5	5	Giedrius Titenis	Lithuania	27.74	Q
10	6	8	Petr Bartůněk	Czech Republic	27.79	Q
11	5	2	Johannes Skagius	Sweden	27.82	Q
12	6	3	Giacomo Perez-Dortona	France	27.84	Q
12	5	6	Fabio Scozzoli	Italy	27.84	Q
14	4	2	Marek Botík	Slovakia	27.92	Q
15	5	7	Yaron Shagalov	Israel	27.93	Q
16	4	3	Alexander Murphy	Ireland	28.00	Q
17	6	9	Jørgen Bråthen	Norway	28.11	
18	6	2	Martin Schweizer	Switzerland	28.15	
19	6	7	Demir Atasoy	Turkey	28.17	
20	3	5	Luchezar Shumkov	Bulgaria	28.21	
21	5	1	Gábor Financsek	Hungary	28.22	
22	4	9	Charlie Attwood	Great Britain	28.29	
23	4	7	Nikolajs Maskaļenko	Latvia	28.33	
24	6	0	Emre Sakçı	Turkey	28.42	
25	4	1	Kristijan Tomić	Croatia	28.44	
26	5	9	Lyubomir Agov	Bulgaria	28.56	
26	5	8	Itay Goldfaden	Israel	28.56	
28	4	0	Filipp Provorkov	Estonia	28.59	
28	3	7	Anton Sveinn McKee	Iceland	28.59	
30	3	2	Théo Bussiere	France	28.60	
31	4	8	Matěj Kuchar	Slovakia	28.66	
32	2	4	Martin Liivamägi	Estonia	28.70	
33	5	0	Martin Allikvee	Estonia	28.76	
34	3	0	Valeriy Dymo	Ukraine	28.85	
35	3	3	Dávid Horváth	Hungary	28.94	
36	2	5	Max Pilger	Germany	28.96	
37	3	1	Mikhail Dorinov	Russia	29.01	
38	3	6	Jolann Bovey	Switzerland	29.05	
39	3	4	Martti Aljand	Estonia	29.06	
40	3	9	Johannes Dietrich	Austria	29.12	
41	2	6	Dimitrios Koulouris	Greece	29.14	
42	2	1	Luca Pfyffer	Switzerland	29.31	
43	2	3	Markos Kalopsidiotis	Cyprus	29.34	
44	2	7	Omiros Zagkas	Cyprus	29.63	
45	2	8	Tomas Veloso	Portugal	29.85	
46	3	8	Dan Sweeney	Ireland	30.11	
47	1	5	Berkay Şendikici	Turkey	30.24	
48	1	4	Adi Mešetović	Bosnia and Herzegovina	30.50	
49	1	3	Lum Zhaveli	Kosovo	30.85	
	2	2	Sverre Næss	Norway	DNS	
	6	1	Ari-Pekka Liukkonen	Finland	DNS	

=== Semifinals ===
The semifinals were held on 20 May at 19:32.

==== Semifinal 1 ====
Rank	Lane	Name	Nationality	Time	Notes
1	3	Ross Murdoch	Great Britain	27.25	Q
2	4	Peter John Stevens	Slovenia	27.29	Q
3	5	Damir Dugonjič	Slovenia	27.46	Q
4	7	Fabio Scozzoli	Italy	27.77	
5	1	Marek Botík	Slovakia	27.78	
6	6	Sami Aaltomaa	Finland	27.82	
7	8	Alexander Murphy	Ireland	27.83	
8	2	Petr Bartůněk	Czech Republic	27.89	

==== Semifinal 2 ====
Rank	Lane	Name	Nationality	Time	Notes
1	4	Adam Peaty	Great Britain	26.66	Q
2	2	Giedrius Titenis	Lithuania	27.48	Q
3	5	Andrea Toniato	Italy	27.53	Q
4	3	Čaba Silađi	Serbia	27.56	Q
5	7	Johannes Skagius	Sweden	27.64	Q
6	6	Panagiotis Samilidis	Greece	27.71	
7	1	Giacomo Perez-Dortona	France	27.87	
8	8	Yaron Shagalov	Israel	28.11	

=== Final ===
The final was on 21 May at 17:43.

Rank	Lane	Name	Nationality	Time	Notes
1st place, gold medalist(s)	4	Adam Peaty	Great Britain	26.66	
2nd place, silver medalist(s)	3	Peter Stevens	Slovenia	27.09	
3rd place, bronze medalist(s)	5	Ross Murdoch	Great Britain	27.31	
4	2	Giedrius Titenis	Lithuania	27.46	
5	8	Johannes Skagius	Sweden	27.54	
6	6	Damir Dugonjič	Slovenia	27.56	
7	1	Čaba Silađi	Serbia	27.72	
8	7	Andrea Toniato	Italy	27.79	
