= Swimming at the 2018 European Aquatics Championships – Men's 100 metre breaststroke =

Men's 100 metre breaststroke at the 2018 European Aquatics Championships
- Venue: Tollcross International Swimming Centre
- Dates: 3 August 2018 (heats and semifinals); 4 August 2018 (final)
- Competitors: 56 from 33 nations
- Winning time: 57.10

Medalists
gold medal	Adam Peaty	Great Britain
silver medal	James Wilby	Great Britain
bronze medal	Anton Chupkov	Russia

The Men's 100 metre breaststroke competition of the 2018 European Aquatics Championships was held on 3 and 4 August 2018. It was won by Adam Peaty in a world record time of 57.10.

== Records ==
Prior to the competition, the existing world and championship records were as follows.

	Name	Nation	Time	Location	Date
World record European record	Adam Peaty	Great Britain	57.13	Rio de Janeiro	7 August 2016
Championship record	Adam Peaty	Great Britain	58.36	London	17 May 2016

The following new records were set during this competition.

Date	Event	Name	Nationality	Time	Record
3 August	Heat	Adam Peaty	Great Britain	57.89	CR
4 August	Final	Adam Peaty	Great Britain	57.10	WR, CR

== Results ==
=== Heats ===
The heats were started on 3 August at 10:46.

Rank	Heat	Lane	Name	Nationality	Time	Notes
1	6	4	Adam Peaty	Great Britain	57.89	Q, CR
2	4	3	James Wilby	Great Britain	59.12	Q
3	4	5	Ross Murdoch	Great Britain	59.14	
4	5	5	Anton Chupkov	Russia	59.15	Q
5	6	5	Arno Kamminga	Netherlands	59.53	Q
6	5	4	Kirill Prigoda	Russia	59.77	Q
7	5	3	Ilya Shymanovich	Belarus	59.84	Q
8	6	6	Ilya Khomenko	Russia	59.92	
9	6	3	Fabio Scozzoli	Italy	1:00.07	Q
10	4	6	Čaba Silađi	Serbia	1:00.08	Q
10	5	6	Giedrius Titenis	Lithuania	1:00.08	Q
12	4	4	Andrius Šidlauskas	Lithuania	1:00.14	Q
13	6	7	Darragh Greene	Ireland	1:00.20	Q
14	6	2	Fabian Schwingenschlögl	Germany	1:00.49	Q
15	5	7	Marcin Stolarski	Poland	1:00.60	Q
16	6	8	Alessandro Pinzuti	Italy	1:00.63	Q
17	3	3	Anton Sveinn McKee	Iceland	1:00.90	Q
18	4	2	Erik Persson	Sweden	1:00.94	Q
19	5	1	Tomáš Klobučník	Slovakia	1:01.00	
20	5	2	Oleg Kostin	Russia	1:01.05	
21	4	7	Yannick Käser	Switzerland	1:01.08	
22	3	1	Tobias Bjerg	Denmark	1:01.19	
23	4	1	Christopher Rothbauer	Austria	1:01.23	
24	4	0	Johannes Skagius	Sweden	1:01.24	
24	5	9	Valentin Bayer	Austria	1:01.24	
26	3	8	Mykyta Koptyelov	Ukraine	1:01.26	
26	5	8	Berkay-Ömer Öğretir	Turkey	1:01.26	
28	6	0	Dávid Horváth	Hungary	1:01.39	
29	6	9	Luca Pizzini	Italy	1:01.52	
30	3	5	Martin Allikvee	Estonia	1:01.55	
31	4	8	Ties Elzerman	Netherlands	1:01.69	
32	5	0	Basten Caerts	Belgium	1:01.73	
33	3	7	Johannes Dietrich	Austria	1:01.80	
34	4	9	Bartłomiej Roguski	Poland	1:02.09	
35	2	4	Jozef Beňo	Slovakia	1:02.12	
36	2	7	Ivan Strilets	Ukraine	1:02.26	
37	2	1	Jacques Laeuffer	Switzerland	1:02.29	
38	2	2	Lyubomir Epitropov	Bulgaria	1:02.38	
39	6	1	Alex Murphy	Ireland	1:02.49	
40	3	2	Lachezar Shumkov	Bulgaria	1:02.58	
41	2	6	Itay Goldfaden	Israel	1:02.64	
42	3	0	Teemu Vuorela	Finland	1:02.72	
43	2	5	Daniils Bobrovs	Latvia	1:03.10	
44	2	3	Nikola Obrovac	Croatia	1:03.23	
45	1	4	Raphaël Stacchiotti	Luxembourg	1:03.37	
46	3	6	Ioannis Karpouzlis	Greece	1:03.40	
47	1	6	Christoph Meier	Liechtenstein	1:03.44	
48	2	9	Tomás Veloso	Portugal	1:03.68	
49	2	8	Filip Chrápavý	Czech Republic	1:03.77	
50	1	5	Marek Botík	Slovakia	1:04.14	
51	3	4	Oleksandr Karpenko	Ukraine	1:04.17	
52	1	3	Oktaycan Emirbayer	Turkey	1:04.45	
53	2	0	Ari-Pekka Liukkonen	Finland	1:04.83	
54	3	9	William Wihanto	Finland	1:05.47	
55	1	2	Michael Stafrace	Malta	1:07.19	
—	1	7	Deni Baholli	Albania	Disqualified	

=== Semifinals ===
The semifinals were held on 3 August at 17:39.

==== Semifinal 1 ====
Rank	Lane	Name	Nationality	Time	Notes
1	4	James Wilby	Great Britain	59.23	Q
2	5	Arno Kamminga	Netherlands	59.74	Q
3	2	Andrius Šidlauskas	Lithuania	59.76	Q
4	3	Ilya Shymanovich	Belarus	1:00.14	
5	6	Giedrius Titenis	Lithuania	1:00.27	
6	1	Alessandro Pinzuti	Italy	1:00.28	
7	8	Erik Persson	Sweden	1:00.54	
8	7	Fabian Schwingenschlögl	Germany	1:00.88	

==== Semifinal 2 ====
Rank	Lane	Name	Nationality	Time	Notes
1	4	Adam Peaty	Great Britain	58.04	Q
2	5	Anton Chupkov	Russia	59.43	Q
3	6	Fabio Scozzoli	Italy	59.65	Q
4	2	Čaba Silađi	Serbia	59.91	Q
5	7	Darragh Greene	Ireland	59.92	QSO
5	3	Kirill Prigoda	Russia	59.92	QSO
7	8	Anton Sveinn McKee	Iceland	1:00.45	
8	1	Marcin Stolarski	Poland	1:01.08	

==== Swim-off ====
The swim-off was held on 3 August at 18:34.

Rank	Lane	Name	Nationality	Time	Notes
1	4	Kirill Prigoda	Russia	59.39	Q
2	5	Darragh Greene	Ireland	1:00.44	

=== Final ===
The final was held on 4 August at 17:13.

Rank	Lane	Name	Nationality	Time	Notes
1st place, gold medalist(s)	4	Adam Peaty	Great Britain	57.10	WR
2nd place, silver medalist(s)	5	James Wilby	Great Britain	58.64	
3rd place, bronze medalist(s)	3	Anton Chupkov	Russia	59.06	
4	8	Kirill Prigoda	Russia	59.20	
5	6	Fabio Scozzoli	Italy	59.61	
6	7	Andrius Šidlauskas	Lithuania	59.62	
7	2	Arno Kamminga	Netherlands	59.69	
8	1	Čaba Silađi	Serbia	1:00.15	
