= 2014 FINA World Swimming Championships (25 m) – Men's 50 metre breaststroke =

Men's 50 metre breaststroke at the 2014 FINA World Swimming Championships (25 m)
- Dates: 6 December (heats and semifinals); 7 December (final)
- Competitors: 109 from 82 nations
- Winning time: 25.63

Medalists
gold medal	Felipe França Silva	Brazil
silver medal	Adam Peaty	Great Britain
silver medal	Cameron van der Burgh	South Africa

The men's 50 metre breaststroke competition of the 2014 FINA World Swimming Championships (25 m) was held on 6 December with the heats and the semifinals and 7 December with the final.

== Records ==
Prior to the competition, the existing world and championship records were as follows.

	Name	Nation	Time	Location	Date
World record	Cameron van der Burgh	South Africa	25.25	Berlin	14 November 2009
Championship record	Felipe França Silva	Brazil	25.95	Dubai	19 December 2010

The following records were established during the competition:

Date	Event	Name	Nation	Time	Record
6 December	Semifinals	Adam Peaty	Great Britain	25.75	CR
7 December	Final	Felipe França Silva	Brazil	25.63	CR

== Results ==
=== Heats ===
The heats were held at 12:12.

Rank	Heat	Lane	Name	Nationality	Time	Notes
1	11	1	Adam Peaty	Great Britain	26.07	Q
2	11	2	Cameron van der Burgh	South Africa	26.27	Q
3	12	4	Felipe França Silva	Brazil	26.37	Q
4	11	4	Damir Dugonjič	Slovenia	26.39	Q
5	10	5	Giacomo Perez-Dortona	France	26.46	Q
6	11	3	Sergey Geybel	Russia	26.55	Q
7	12	3	Kirill Prigoda	Russia	26.56	Q
8	10	3	João Luiz Gomes Júnior	Brazil	26.59	Q
9	11	6	Glenn Snyders	New Zealand	26.61	Q
10	12	5	Fabio Scozzoli	Italy	26.65	Q
11	10	4	Yasuhiro Koseki	Japan	26.74	Q
12	12	6	Johannes Skagius	Sweden	26.80	Q
13	11	7	Giulio Zorzi	South Africa	26.84	Q
14	11	5	Cody Miller	United States	26.85	Q
15	8	5	Brad Craig	United States	26.87	Q
16	12	7	Andrea Toniato	Italy	26.88	Q
17	12	2	Nikolajs Maskaļenko	Latvia	26.95	
18	10	1	Saša Gerbec	Croatia	27.00	
19	12	1	Giedrius Titenis	Lithuania	27.04	
19	12	0	Tomáš Klobučník	Slovakia	27.04	
21	10	0	Kristijan Tomić	Croatia	27.06	
22	9	8	Renato Prono	Paraguay	27.11	
23	12	8	Jake Packard	Australia	27.17	
24	11	0	Jorge Murillo	Colombia	27.19	
25	11	9	Petr Bartůněk	Czech Republic	27.20	
26	11	8	Marek Botík	Slovakia	27.25	
27	10	7	Ari-Pekka Liukkonen	Finland	27.26	
28	12	9	Eetu Karvonen	Finland	27.32	
29	10	8	Andriy Kovalenko	Ukraine	27.39	
30	9	5	Édgar Crespo	Panama	27.40	
31	8	6	Valeriy Dymo	Ukraine	27.43	
32	9	9	Vladislav Mustafin	Uzbekistan	27.45	
33	9	1	Martin Allikvee	Estonia	27.47	
34	9	4	Yuta Oshikiri	Japan	27.65	
35	8	4	Laurent Carnol	Luxembourg	27.66	
35	9	3	Filipp Provorkov	Estonia	27.66	
37	8	9	Joshua Hall	Philippines	27.67	
38	8	2	Chao Man Hou	Macau	27.68	
39	10	9	Abraham McLeod	Trinidad and Tobago	27.69	
40	8	7	Raphaël Stacchiotti	Luxembourg	27.76	
41	9	6	David Horvath	Hungary	27.77	
42	9	2	Martín Melconian	Uruguay	27.79	
43	9	0	Sverre Næss	Norway	27.89	
44	8	1	Josué Domínguez	Dominican Republic	27.98	
45	8	8	Vais Kirill	Kyrgyzstan	28.09	
46	7	5	Rafael van Leeuwaarde	Suriname	28.13	
47	9	7	Wong Chun Yan	Hong Kong	28.14	
48	7	4	Azad Al-Barazi	Syria	28.17	
49	7	8	Hüseyin Sakçı	Turkey	28.28	
49	8	0	Gálvez Capriles	Dominican Republic	28.28	
51	5	8	Amini Fonua	Tonga	28.35	
52	7	1	Anton Zheltiakov	Azerbaijan	28.63	
53	6	0	William Colon	Puerto Rico	28.75	
54	6	4	Markos Kalopsidiotis	Cyprus	28.78	
55	6	8	Sittivech Kongsomrerk	Thailand	28.80	
56	7	2	Julian Harding	Malta	28.82	
57	7	6	Adam Allouche	Lebanon	28.87	
58	7	9	Julian Fletcher	Bermuda	28.94	
59	8	3	James Lawson	Zimbabwe	29.02	
60	7	7	Christoph Meier	Liechtenstein	29.32	
61	7	0	Lee Hsuan-yen	Chinese Taipei	29.42	
62	6	5	Arnoldo Herrera	Costa Rica	29.46	
63	6	2	Jesús Flores	Honduras	29.47	
64	6	1	Adama Ndir	Senegal	29.48	
65	5	3	Meli Malani	Fiji	29.50	
66	6	6	Ramazan Taimatov	Kyrgyzstan	29.69	
67	4	2	Kiran Jasinghe	Sri Lanka	29.74	
68	4	1	Corey Ollivierre	Grenada	29.76	
69	6	3	Ralefy Anthonny	Madagascar	29.77	
70	6	9	Micah Fernandes	Kenya	29.81	
71	5	1	Charlie Salame	Lebanon	30.28	
72	5	6	Omar Al-Malki	Bahrain	30.29	
73	5	5	Pierre-Andre Adam	Seychelles	30.31	
74	5	4	Dhill Lee	Philippines	30.32	
75	5	2	Walid Daloul	Qatar	30.47	
76	4	3	Kitso Matija	Botswana	30.83	
77	5	7	Shahjahan Ali	Bangladesh	30.85	
78	4	0	Yosif Al-Musallam	Kuwait	31.10	
79	5	0	Foresight Osamezu	Nigeria	31.14	
80	4	6	Muis Ahmad	Brunei	31.16	
81	5	9	Douglas Miller	Fiji	31.17	
82	4	4	John Llanelo	Gibraltar	31.31	
83	6	7	Hemra Nurmyradov	Turkmenistan	31.37	
84	3	6	Matthew Shone	Zambia	31.60	
85	3	1	Andrew Hopkin	Grenada	31.78	
86	4	5	Deni Baholli	Albania	31.84	
87	4	7	Nikolas Sylvester	Saint Vincent and the Grenadines	32.17	
88	3	2	Thonponloeu Hem	Cambodia	32.18	
89	4	8	J'Air Smith	Antigua and Barbuda	32.19	
90	3	8	Dionisio Augustine	Federated States of Micronesia	32.23	
91	4	9	Abdullah Al-Yehari	Qatar	32.38	
92	3	3	Elisha Tibatemwa	Uganda	32.69	
93	2	6	Petero Okotai	Cook Islands	32.98	
94	3	5	Justin Payet	Seychelles	33.60	
95	2	4	Temaruata Strickland	Cook Islands	33.82	
96	2	2	Slava Sihanouvong	Laos	34.01	
97	3	9	Akhmadzhanovich Umarov	Tajikistan	34.16	
98	3	7	Binald Mahmuti	Albania	34.31	
99	2	1	Storm Hablich	Saint Vincent and the Grenadines	34.99	
100	2	8	Abdoul Nignan	Burkina Faso	35.09	
101	2	3	Tommy Imazu	Guam	35.26	
102	2	0	Tanner Poppe	Guam	36.27	
103	1	3	Ebrahim Al-Maleki	Yemen	37.64	
104	3	0	Billy-Scott Irakoze	Burundi	38.59	
105	2	7	Faridun Navruzov	Tajikistan	39.13	
106	1	6	Rayane Alognisso	Benin	40.43	
—	1	5	Jynior Ndinga	Republic of the Congo		DNS
—	3	4	Kgosietsile Molefinyane	Botswana		DNS
—	7	3	Ahmad Al-Bader	Kuwait		DNS
—	10	2	Martin Schweizer	Switzerland		DNS
—	10	6	Li Xiang	China		DNS
—	1	4	Mohamed Mamane	Niger		DSQ
—	2	5	Sawadogo Tindwende	Burkina Faso		DSQ
—	2	9	Doukoure Doukoure	Democratic Republic of the Congo		DSQ

=== Semifinals ===
The semifinals were held at 19:32.

==== Semifinal 1 ====
Rank	Lane	Name	Nationality	Time	Notes
1	4	Cameron van der Burgh	South Africa	26.11	Q
2	6	João Luiz Gomes Júnior	Brazil	26.25	Q
3	5	Damir Dugonjič	Slovenia	26.33	Q
4	2	Fabio Scozzoli	Italy	26.36	Q
5	1	Cody Miller	United States	26.43	
6	8	Andrea Toniato	Italy	26.52	
7	3	Sergey Geybel	Russia	26.54	
8	7	Johannes Skagius	Sweden	26.59	

==== Semifinal 2 ====
Rank	Lane	Name	Nationality	Time	Notes
1	4	Adam Peaty	Great Britain	25.75	Q, CR
2	5	Felipe França Silva	Brazil	25.77	Q
3	6	Kirill Prigoda	Russia	26.04	Q
4	3	Giacomo Perez-Dortona	France	26.31	Q
5	2	Glenn Snyders	New Zealand	26.58	
6	1	Giulio Zorzi	South Africa	26.68	
7	8	Brad Craig	United States	26.75	
8	7	Yasuhiro Koseki	Japan	26.91	

=== Final ===
The final was held at 19:03.

Rank	Lane	Name	Nationality	Time	Notes
1st place, gold medalist(s)	5	Felipe França Silva	Brazil	25.63	CR, AM
2nd place, silver medalist(s)	4	Adam Peaty	Great Britain	25.87	
2nd place, silver medalist(s)	6	Cameron van der Burgh	South Africa	25.87	
4	1	Damir Dugonjič	Slovenia	26.03	
5	8	Fabio Scozzoli	Italy	26.15	
6	7	Giacomo Perez-Dortona	France	26.18	
7	3	Kirill Prigoda	Russia	26.23	
8	2	João Luiz Gomes Júnior	Brazil	26.39	
