= 2014 FINA World Swimming Championships (25 m) – Men's 100 metre breaststroke =

Men's 100 metre breaststroke at the 2014 FINA World Swimming Championships (25 m)
- Dates: 3 December (heats and semifinals); 4 December (final)
- Competitors: 98 from 75 nations
- Winning time: 56.29

Medalists
gold medal	Felipe França Silva	Brazil
silver medal	Adam Peaty	Great Britain
bronze medal	Giacomo Perez-Dortona	France

The men's 100 metre breaststroke competition of the 2014 FINA World Swimming Championships (25 m) was held on 3 December with the heats and the semifinals and 4 December with the final.

== Records ==
Prior to the competition, the existing world and championship records were as follows.

	Name	Nation	Time	Location	Date
World record	Cameron van der Burgh	South Africa	55.61	Berlin	15 November 2009
Championship record	Cameron van der Burgh	South Africa	56.80	Dubai	16 December 2010

The following records were established during the competition:

Date	Event	Name	Nation	Time	Record
3 December	Semifinals	Adam Peaty	United Kingdom	56.43	CR
4 December	Final	Felipe França Silva	Brazil	56.29	CR

== Results ==
=== Heats ===
The heats were held at 11:01.

Rank	Heat	Lane	Name	Nationality	Time	Notes
1	8	7	Adam Peaty	Great Britain	57.02	Q
2	10	4	Felipe França Silva	Brazil	57.13	Q
3	9	3	Kirill Prigoda	Russia	57.53	Q
4	8	6	Giacomo Perez-Dortona	France	57.57	Q
4	9	5	Cody Miller	United States	57.57	Q
6	6	2	Brad Craig	United States	57.64	Q
7	8	4	Damir Dugonjič	Slovenia	57.65	Q
8	10	5	Oleg Kostin	Russia	57.74	Q
9	9	6	Tomáš Klobučník	Slovakia	57.75	Q
10	10	3	Fabio Scozzoli	Italy	57.86	Q
11	8	5	Marco Koch	Germany	57.88	Q
12	10	8	Johannes Skagius	Sweden	57.96	Q
13	10	6	Cameron van der Burgh	South Africa	57.97	Q
14	9	4	Yasuhiro Koseki	Japan	58.14	Q
15	8	3	Glenn Snyders	New Zealand	58.23	Q
16	10	2	Jake Packard	Australia	58.25	Q
17	8	2	Giedrius Titenis	Lithuania	58.51	
18	10	0	Andrea Toniato	Italy	58.69	
19	7	3	Valeriy Dymo	Ukraine	58.74	
20	8	1	Martti Aljand	Estonia	58.87	
21	9	2	Yuta Oshikiri	Japan	58.92	
22	9	7	Eetu Karvonen	Finland	59.03	
23	10	7	João Luiz Gomes Júnior	Brazil	59.05	
24	6	6	Yakov Toumarkin	Israel	59.09	
25	7	0	Jorge Murillo	Colombia	59.12	
26	10	1	Andriy Kovalenko	Ukraine	59.17	
27	9	0	Martin Allikvee	Estonia	59.22	
28	9	8	Martin Schweizer	Switzerland	59.24	
29	7	8	Petr Bartůněk	Czech Republic	59.33	
30	7	6	Giulio Zorzi	South Africa	59.37	
31	7	9	Marek Botík	Slovakia	59.49	
32	7	4	David Horvath	Hungary	59.59	
33	8	9	Édgar Crespo	Panama	59.75	
33	9	1	Gal Nevo	Israel	59.75	
35	6	7	Vladislav Mustafin	Uzbekistan	59.78	
35	7	1	Kristijan Tomić	Croatia	59.78	
37	6	5	Renato Prono	Paraguay	59.83	
37	9	9	Laurent Carnol	Luxembourg	59.83	
39	10	9	Li Xiang	China	59.90	
40	8	8	Nikolajs Maskaļenko	Latvia	59.93	
41	7	7	Sverre Næss	Norway	59.94	
42	6	8	Jakub Maly	Austria	1:00.01	
43	6	0	Azad Al-Barazi	Syria	1:00.26	
44	7	2	Ari-Pekka Liukkonen	Finland	1:00.30	
45	6	4	Saša Gerbec	Croatia	1:00.35	
46	7	5	Chris Christensen	Denmark	1:00.58	
47	6	1	Josué Domínguez	Dominican Republic	1:00.63	
48	5	5	Joshua Hall	Philippines	1:00.68	
49	6	3	Martín Melconian	Uruguay	1:00.81	
50	8	0	Abraham McLeod	Trinidad and Tobago	1:00.85	
51	5	7	Christoph Meier	Liechtenstein	1:01.20	
52	5	4	Rafael van Leeuwaarde	Suriname	1:01.32	
53	4	5	Alpkan Örnek	Turkey	1:01.75	
54	5	0	Hüseyin Sakcı	Turkey	1:01.77	
55	5	8	Julian Fletcher	Bermuda	1:02.04	
56	5	6	Vais Kirill	Kyrgyzstan	1:02.33	
57	5	1	Anton Zheltiakov	Azerbaijan	1:02.44	
58	5	3	Wong Chun Yan	Hong Kong	1:02.61	
59	6	9	Lee Hsuan-yen	Chinese Taipei	1:02.63	
60	3	3	William Colon	Puerto Rico	1:03.11	
61	5	9	Arnoldo Herrera	Costa Rica	1:03.18	
62	4	2	Sittivech Kongsomrerk	Thailand	1:03.31	
63	5	2	James Lawson	Zimbabwe	1:03.59	
64	4	7	Jesús Flores	Honduras	1:03.69	
65	4	1	Gálvez Capriles	Dominican Republic	1:03.73	
66	4	4	Julian Harding	Malta	1:04.35	
67	4	3	Micah Fernandes	Kenya	1:04.51	
68	4	6	Ramazan Taimatov	Kyrgyzstan	1:04.58	
69	3	2	Kiran Jasinghe	Sri Lanka	1:04.94	
70	4	8	Dhill Lee	Philippines	1:05.41	
71	3	5	Zandanbal Gunsennorov	Mongolia	1:05.61	
72	3	9	Markos Kalopsidiotis	Cyprus	1:05.95	
73	4	9	Adam Allouche	Lebanon	1:06.14	
74	4	0	Yosif Al-Musallam	Kuwait	1:06.35	
75	2	7	Corey Ollivierre	Grenada	1:06.62	
76	3	1	Muis Ahmad	Brunei	1:06.83	
77	2	5	Hemra Nurmyradov	Turkmenistan	1:07.25	
78	3	0	Pierre-Andre Adam	Seychelles	1:07.62	
79	3	7	Charlie Salame	Lebanon	1:07.68	
80	3	4	Mohammad Basheer	Kuwait	1:08.12	
81	3	6	Walid Daloul	Qatar	1:08.33	
82	2	9	Matthew Shone	Zambia	1:08.49	
83	3	8	Douglas Miller	Fiji	1:08.62	
84	2	4	Deni Baholli	Albania	1:08.65	
85	1	5	Kitso Matija	Botswana	1:10.15	
86	2	3	J'Air Smith	Antigua and Barbuda	1:10.34	
87	2	0	Nikolas Sylvester	Saint Vincent and the Grenadines	1:10.48	
88	2	2	John Llanelo	Gibraltar	1:10.80	
89	2	1	Foresight Osamezu	Nigeria	1:11.13	
90	1	8	Dionisio Augustine	Federated States of Micronesia	1:13.11	
91	1	4	Elisha Tibatemwa	Uganda	1:13.22	
92	1	2	Storm Hablich	Saint Vincent and the Grenadines	1:18.74	
93	1	7	Christian Villacrusis	Northern Mariana Islands	1:18.93	
94	1	9	Justin Payet	Seychelles	1:19.97	
95	1	6	Tanner Poppe	Guam	1:24.49	
96	1	1	Awoussou Ablam	Benin	1:26.91	
—	1	3	Mohamed Mamane	Niger		DNS
—	2	6	Abdullah Al-Yehari	Qatar		DSQ
—	2	8	Binald Mahmuti	Albania		DSQ

=== Semifinals ===
The semifinals were held at 18:36.

==== Semifinal 1 ====
Rank	Lane	Name	Nationality	Time	Notes
1	1	Yasuhiro Koseki	Japan	57.06	Q
2	4	Felipe França Silva	Brazil	57.21	Q
3	5	Giacomo Perez-Dortona	France	57.24	Q
4	6	Oleg Kostin	Russia	57.31	
5	8	Jake Packard	Australia	57.54	
6	2	Fabio Scozzoli	Italy	57.73	
7	3	Brad Craig	United States	57.80	
8	7	Johannes Skagius	Sweden	57.90	

==== Semifinal 2 ====
Rank	Lane	Name	Nationality	Time	Notes
1	4	Adam Peaty	Great Britain	56.43	Q, CR
2	5	Kirill Prigoda	Russia	56.93	Q
3	6	Damir Dugonjič	Slovenia	57.09	Q
4	1	Cameron van der Burgh	South Africa	57.18	Q
5	3	Cody Miller	United States	57.28	Q
6	7	Marco Koch	Germany	57.47	
7	2	Tomáš Klobučník	Slovakia	57.71	
8	8	Glenn Snyders	New Zealand	57.84	

=== Final ===
The final was held at 19:11.

Rank	Lane	Name	Nationality	Time	Notes
1st place, gold medalist(s)	7	Felipe França Silva	Brazil	56.29	CR
2nd place, silver medalist(s)	4	Adam Peaty	Great Britain	56.35	
3rd place, bronze medalist(s)	1	Giacomo Perez-Dortona	France	56.78	
4	2	Cameron van der Burgh	South Africa	56.80	
5	3	Yasuhiro Koseki	Japan	57.06	
5	6	Damir Dugonjič	Slovenia	57.06	
7	5	Kirill Prigoda	Russia	57.19	
8	8	Cody Miller	United States	57.39	
