= 2016 FINA World Swimming Championships (25 m) – Men's 50 metre breaststroke =

Men's 50 metre breaststroke at the 2016 FINA World Swimming Championships (25 m)
- Venue: WFCU Centre
- Dates: 10 December (heats and semifinals); 11 December (final)
- Competitors: 96 from 73 nations
- Winning time: 25.64

Medalists
gold medal	Cameron van der Burgh	South Africa
silver medal	Peter Stevens	Slovenia
bronze medal	Felipe Lima	Brazil

The Men's 50 metre breaststroke competition of the 2016 FINA World Swimming Championships (25 m) was held on 10 and 11 December 2016.

== Records ==
Prior to the competition, the existing world and championship records were as follows.

	Name	Nation	Time	Location	Date
World record	Cameron van der Burgh	South Africa	25.25	Berlin	14 November 2009
Championship record	Felipe França Silva	Brazil	25.63	Doha	7 December 2014

== Results ==
=== Heats ===
The heats were held at 11:51.

Rank	Heat	Lane	Name	Nationality	Time	Notes
1	9	4	Kirill Prigoda	Russia	26.23	Q
2	10	4	Felipe Lima	Brazil	26.26	Q
3	8	1	Peter Stevens	Slovenia	26.33	Q
4	9	3	Cody Miller	United States	26.34	Q
5	11	5	Felipe França Silva	Brazil	26.44	Q
6	11	4	Cameron van der Burgh	South Africa	26.55	Q
7	11	7	Michael Andrew	United States	26.56	Q
8	11	6	Fabio Scozzoli	Italy	26.57	Q
9	10	5	Ilya Shymanovich	Belarus	26.58	Q
10	9	5	Oleg Kostin	Russia	26.61	Q
11	7	9	Carlos Claverie	Venezuela	26.64	Q
12	10	2	Johannes Skagius	Sweden	26.65	Q
13	11	3	Giulio Zorzi	South Africa	26.67	Q
14	10	6	Renato Prono	Paraguay	26.68	Q
15	10	8	Yan Zibei	China	26.75	Q
16	11	2	Andrei Tuomola	Finland	26.77	Q
17	8	9	Richard Funk	Canada	26.78	
17	9	7	Tommy Sucipto	Australia	26.78	
19	8	0	Jason Block	Canada	26.81	
19	10	0	Kristijan Tomic	Croatia	26.81	
21	9	9	Petr Bartunek	Czech Republic	26.83	
22	11	8	Yoshiki Yamanaka	Japan	26.91	
23	10	9	Nikolajs Maskalenko	Latvia	26.95	
24	10	3	Giedrius Titenis	Lithuania	27.00	
25	9	2	Li Xiang	China	27.04	
26	9	8	Martin Schweizer	Switzerland	27.07	
27	9	1	Roman Trussov	Kazakhstan	27.09	
28	8	3	Andrius Šidlauskas	Lithuania	27.10	
29	8	2	Youssef El Kamash	Egypt	27.17	
30	9	0	Marek Botik	Slovakia	27.18	
31	8	7	Azad Albarazi	Syria	27.23	
31	8	8	Man Hou Chao	Macau	27.23	
33	7	7	Kazuki Kohinata	Japan	27.24	
34	7	6	Jordy Groters	Aruba	27.25	
35	10	1	Ari-Pekka Liukkonen	Finland	27.28	
36	10	7	Jorge Murillo	Colombia	27.38	
37	11	1	Martin Liivamägi	Estonia	27.43	
38	11	0	Lyubomir Agov	Bulgaria	27.44	
39	11	9	Martti Aljand	Estonia	27.57	
40	8	4	Sasa Gerbec	Croatia	27.58	
41	8	6	Jonas Coreelman	Belgium	27.62	
42	6	4	James Deiparine	Philippines	27.65	
43	8	5	Jean Dencausse	France	27.69	
44	7	3	Chien Yin Khoo	Singapore	27.77	
45	7	5	Johannes Dietrich	Germany	27.97	
46	7	8	Santiago Cavanagh	Bolivia	27.99	
47	6	8	Chun Yan Wong	Hong Kong	28.18	
48	7	1	Hoi Tung Raymond Tsui	Hong Kong	28.19	
49	6	5	Radomyos Matjiur	Thailand	28.20	
50	7	2	Christopher Rothbauer	Austria	28.21	
51	6	2	Adi Mesetovic	Bosnia and Herzegovina	28.26	
52	5	5	Markos Kalopsidiotis	Cyprus	28.38	
53	6	7	Viktor Vilbergsson	Iceland	28.41	
54	6	1	Julian Fletcher	Bermuda	28.42	
55	6	6	Daniils Bobrovs	Latvia	28.51	
56	6	2	Gregory Penny	United States Virgin Islands	28.55	
57	5	8	Marko Blazhevski	Macedonia	28.58	
58	4	3	Arnoldo Herrera	Costa Rica	28.65	
59	5	4	James Lawson	Zimbabwe	28.71	
60	5	6	Sultan Bukeev	Kyrgyzstan	28.77	
61	5	0	Ralph Goveia	Zambia	28.79	
62	7	0	Arya Nasimi Shad	Iran	28.91	
63	6	9	Fausto Huerta	Dominican Republic	28.92	
64	1	3	Christopher Cheong	Singapore	29.09	
65	4	7	Ashley Seeto	Papua New Guinea	29.18	
66	5	1	Darren Chan Chin Wah	Mauritius	29.20	
67	5	9	Denis Petrashov	Kyrgyzstan	29.24	
68	5	2	Alex Aziotis	Zambia	29.26	
69	9	6	Rainier Rafaela	Curaçao	29.52	
70	4	8	Alfonso José Bautista	Philippines	29.57	
70	5	7	Damjan Petrovski	Macedonia	29.57	
72	5	3	Michael Stafrace	Malta	29.66	
73	4	9	José David Solis Rosales	Costa Rica	29.71	
74	4	1	Adrian Hoek	Curaçao	29.82	
75	3	3	Deni Baholli	Albania	29.85	
75	4	5	Ryan Maskelyne	Papua New Guinea	29.85	
77	1	5	Muis Ahmad	Brunei	29.90	
78	4	4	Pedro Pinotes	Angola	30.07	
79	3	5	Marco Flores	Honduras	30.36	
80	3	4	Samuele Rossi	Seychelles	30.48	
81	4	6	Miguel Mena	Nicaragua	30.80	
82	3	6	John Paul Llanelo	Gibraltar	31.35	
83	3	0	Meriton Veliu	Kosovo	31.39	
84	2	4	Temaruata Strickland	Cook Islands	32.32	
85	2	5	Shuvam Shrestra	Nepal	32.45	
86	2	8	Salofi Charles Welch	Northern Mariana Islands	32.70	
87	3	8	Adil Bharmal	Tanzania	33.02	
88	3	1	Devin Tyrek Boodha	Saint Lucia	33.34	
89	2	1	Alassane Seydou	Niger	33.45	
90	2	2	Christian Villacrusis	Northern Mariana Islands	33.88	
91	2	7	Fakhriddin Madkamov	Tajikistan	36.93	
92	2	9	Jegan Jobe	Gambia	36.99	
93	2	0	Simphiwe Dlamini	Eswatini	37.09	
94	3	7	Michael Swift	Malawi	37.28	
95	1	2	Roland Zouetaba	Burkina Faso	38.31	
	1	6	Tindwende Sawadogo	Burkina Faso		DNS
	2	3	Saidu Kamara	Sierra Leone		DNS
	2	6	Carel Van Melvin Irakoze	Burundi		DNS
	3	2	Joshua Tibatemwa	Uganda		DNS
	3	9	Djalonka Koulibaly	Guinea		DNS
	4	0	Marc Rojas	Dominican Republic		DNS
	4	2	Ablam Awoussou	Benin		DNS
	6	0	Meli Malani	Fiji		DNS
	7	4	Adam Ismail Allouche	Lebanon		DNS
	1	4	Dennis Hamis Mhini	Tanzania		DSQ

=== Semifinals ===
The semifinals were held at 19:30.

==== Semifinal 1 ====
Rank	Lane	Name	Nationality	Time	Notes
1	4	Felipe Lima	Brazil	26.08	Q
2	6	Fabio Scozzoli	Italy	26.11	Q
3	5	Cody Miller	United States	26.15	Q
4	3	Cameron van der Burgh	South Africa	26.20	Q
5	7	Johannes Skagius	Sweden	26.43	
5	8	Andrei Tuomola	Finland	26.43	
7	2	Oleg Kostin	Russia	26.56	
	4	Renato Prono	Paraguay		DSQ

==== Semifinal 2 ====
Rank	Lane	Name	Nationality	Time	Notes
1	4	Kirill Prigoda	Russia	25.95	Q
2	1	Giulio Zorzi	South Africa	26.08	Q
3	3	Felipe França Silva	Brazil	26.10	Q
4	5	Peter Stevens	Slovenia	26.29	Q
5	6	Michael Andrew	United States	26.39	
6	2	Ilya Shymanovich	Belarus	26.43	
7	7	Carlos Claverie	Venezuela	26.86	
8	8	Yan Zibei	China	26.95	

=== Final ===
The final was held at 19:50

Rank	Lane	Name	Nationality	Time	Notes
1st place, gold medalist(s)	1	Cameron van der Burgh	South Africa	25.64	
2nd place, silver medalist(s)	8	Peter Stevens	Slovenia	25.85	
3rd place, bronze medalist(s)	5	Felipe Lima	Brazil	25.98	
4	4	Kirill Prigoda	Russia	26.03	
5	3	Giulio Zorzi	South Africa	26.13	
5	6	Felipe França Silva	Brazil	26.13	
7	2	Fabio Scozzoli	Italy	26.18	
7	7	Cody Miller	United States	26.18	
