= Adam Ramsay-Peaty =

British swimmer (born 1994)

Adam Ramsay-Peaty OBE OLY
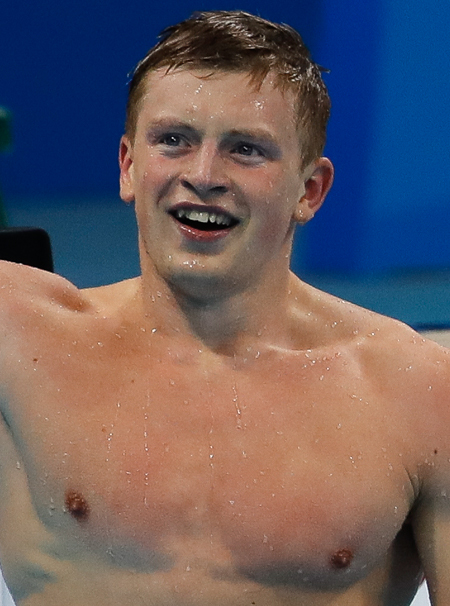
- Peaty after winning the men's 100 metre breaststroke at the 2016 Summer Olympics

Personal information
- Full name: Adam George Ramsay-Peaty
- National team: Great Britain; England
- Born: Adam George Peaty; 28 December 1994 (age 31) Uttoxeter, England
- Height: 1.91 m (6 ft 3 in)
- Weight: 95 kg (209 lb)
- Spouse: Holly Ramsay (m. 2025)
- Partner: Eirianedd Munro (2019–2022)
- Children: 1
- Relatives: Gordon Ramsay (father-in-law); Tana Ramsay (mother-in-law); Tilly Ramsay (sister-in-law)

Sport
- Sport: Swimming
- Strokes: Breaststroke
- Club: Loughborough University; London Roar
- Coach: Mel Marshall
Medal record
Event	1st	2nd	3rd
Olympic Games	3	3	0
World Championships (LC)	8	1	3
World Championships (SC)	0	3	1
European Championships (LC)	16	0	0
European Championships (SC)	1	2	1
Commonwealth Games	4	3	1
Total	32	12	6
Representing Great Britain
Olympic Games
Gold medal – first place	2016 Rio de Janeiro	100 m breaststroke
Gold medal – first place	2020 Tokyo	100 m breaststroke
Gold medal – first place	2020 Tokyo	4×100 m mixed medley
Silver medal – second place	2016 Rio de Janeiro	4×100 m medley
Silver medal – second place	2020 Tokyo	4×100 m medley
Silver medal – second place	2024 Paris	100 m breaststroke
World Championships (LC)
Gold medal – first place	2015 Kazan	50 m breaststroke
Gold medal – first place	2015 Kazan	100 m breaststroke
Gold medal – first place	2015 Kazan	4×100 m mixed medley
Gold medal – first place	2017 Budapest	50 m breaststroke
Gold medal – first place	2017 Budapest	100 m breaststroke
Gold medal – first place	2019 Gwangju	50 m breaststroke
Gold medal – first place	2019 Gwangju	100 m breaststroke
Gold medal – first place	2019 Gwangju	4×100 m medley
Silver medal – second place	2017 Budapest	4×100 m medley
Bronze medal – third place	2019 Gwangju	4×100 m mixed medley
Bronze medal – third place	2024 Doha	100 m breaststroke
Bronze medal – third place	2024 Doha	4×100 m mixed medley
World Championships (SC)
Silver medal – second place	2014 Doha	50 m breaststroke
Silver medal – second place	2014 Doha	100 m breaststroke
Silver medal – second place	2014 Doha	4×50 m mixed medley
Bronze medal – third place	2022 Melbourne	100 m breaststroke
European Championships (LC)
Gold medal – first place	2014 Berlin	50 m breaststroke
Gold medal – first place	2014 Berlin	100 m breaststroke
Gold medal – first place	2014 Berlin	4×100 m medley
Gold medal – first place	2014 Berlin	4×100 m mixed medley
Gold medal – first place	2016 London	50 m breaststroke
Gold medal – first place	2016 London	100 m breaststroke
Gold medal – first place	2016 London	4×100 m medley
Gold medal – first place	2016 London	4×100 m mixed medley
Gold medal – first place	2018 Glasgow	50 m breaststroke
Gold medal – first place	2018 Glasgow	100 m breaststroke
Gold medal – first place	2018 Glasgow	4×100 m mixed medley
Gold medal – first place	2018 Glasgow	4×100 m medley
Gold medal – first place	2020 Budapest	50m breaststroke
Gold medal – first place	2020 Budapest	100 m breaststroke
Gold medal – first place	2020 Budapest	4×100 m mixed medley
Gold medal – first place	2020 Budapest	4×100 m medley
European Championships (SC)
Gold medal – first place	2017 Copenhagen	100 m breaststroke
Silver medal – second place	2015 Netanya	50 m breaststroke
Silver medal – second place	2015 Netanya	100 m breaststroke
Bronze medal – third place	2017 Copenhagen	50 m breaststroke
Representing England
Commonwealth Games
Gold medal – first place	2014 Glasgow	100 m breaststroke
Gold medal – first place	2014 Glasgow	4×100 m medley
Gold medal – first place	2018 Gold Coast	100 m breaststroke
Gold medal – first place	2022 Birmingham	50 m breaststroke
Silver medal – second place	2014 Glasgow	50 m breaststroke
Silver medal – second place	2018 Gold Coast	50 m breaststroke
Silver medal – second place	2018 Gold Coast	4×100 m medley
Silver medal – second place	2026 Glasgow	4×100 m medley
Bronze medal – third place	2026 Glasgow	50 m breaststroke
Bronze medal – third place	2026 Glasgow	100 m breaststroke

Adam George Ramsay-Peaty (né Peaty; born 28 December 1994) is an English competitive swimmer who specialises in the sprint breaststroke events. He won the gold medal in the 100 metre breaststroke at the 2016 Summer Olympics, the first by a male British swimmer in 24 years, and retained the title at the 2020 Summer Olympics in 2021, the first British swimmer ever to retain an Olympic title.

He is also an eight-time World Champion, a sixteen-time European Champion and a four-time Commonwealth Champion. Between the years 2014 and 2020, Ramsay-Peaty achieved complete dominance in the 100 metre breaststroke in long-course major championships, and almost complete dominance of the 50 metre breaststroke, with only Cameron van der Burgh of South Africa's victories in the Commonwealth Games of 2014 and 2018 interrupting his reign. According to FINA itself, Peaty is widely regarded as the dominant breaststroke swimmer of his era, and the most dominant sprint breaststroke swimmer of all time.

Ramsay-Peaty is the holder of the world record in 50 metre and 100 metre breaststroke events. He has broken 14 world records, becoming the first man to swim under 26 seconds for the 50 metre breaststroke and the first to swim the 100 metre breaststroke under both 58 and 57 seconds. He is the first swimmer ever to win both sprint breaststroke events at the same World championships, and the most successful British swimmer in a single World Championships.

Ramsay-Peaty is one of only six British swimmers, with David Wilkie, Rebecca Adlington, James Guy, Duncan Scott, and Tom Dean to have won gold medals at all four major international events (Olympic, World, European and Commonwealth Games), and with David Wilkie the only swimmers to hold all four major gold medals in the same single event at the same time, a feat he completed in winning the 100 metre breaststroke at the 2016 Olympics, and which he uniquely maintained through the 2020 Olympics. Peaty is a six-time European swimmer of the year which he has won consecutively from 2014 to 2019, and also a two-time World swimmer of the year in 2015 and 2018.

== Early life ==
Adam George Peaty was born on 28 December 1994 in Uttoxeter, Staffordshire, to Mark and Caroline Peaty, the youngest of four children. He attended St Josephs Catholic Primary School in Uttoxeter, Painsley Catholic College in Cheadle and Derby College. As a young boy, he developed an acute fear of water and was averse to being put in the bath after his brothers told him that sharks may come up through the plughole. At four years of age Peaty and his friend both went on their first swimming lesson together. It was at this swimming lesson where he lost the fear.

Ramsay-Peaty first joined Dove Valley Swimming Club in Uttoxeter when he was nine, and started to win races and setting club records by the time he was twelve. When he was 14, a friend took Peaty to join City of Derby Swimming Club, but the coach at the club, former Olympic swimmer Melanie Marshall, was not impressed by Peaty's performance in the freestyle and put him in the slow lane with younger girls. However, she noticed "something special" the first time she saw him swim breaststroke.

She also recognised the advantages of his large hands, big feet, "extraordinary cardiovascular system", and hyper-mobile, double-jointed knees and ankles. According to Peaty, he did not take swimming seriously until he was 17 – he was preparing for a night out drinking with friends when he read that Craig Benson, whom he knew well from the junior circuit, made the semi-final of the 100m breaststroke at the 2012 London Olympics. This prompted him to reassess his priorities, and spurred him on to commit fully to swimming and train full-time.

== Career ==
"I can't believe it, it's a dream, I've studied Cameron [van der Burgh] for a while–he was my idol, and now he's my rival. I knew I would go off quickly, but I caught him. It is a major stepping-stone for me, and for swimming in the country."

— The Daily Telegraph quoting Peaty

Ramsay-Peaty started training at the City of Derby swimming club in 2007, where he was coached by Melanie Marshall. He also trained up to eight times per week at Repton School, a co-educational boarding independent school in the village of Repton in Derbyshire, and two sessions at Loughborough University. He started to train full-time at Loughborough University in 2017. Peaty's first senior event was the 2013 European Short Course Swimming Championships where he achieved three personal best times in the three breaststroke events.

=== 2014 ===
At the 2014 Commonwealth Games in Glasgow, Scotland, Ramsay-Peaty entered four events: the 50 metre breaststroke, the 100 metre breaststroke, the 200 metre breaststroke, and the 4 × 100 metre medley relay. In the 50 metre breaststroke, he qualified fastest out of the heats, setting a new Commonwealth Games record, before winning his semi-final to qualify second fastest for the final. He eventually finished second in the final with a time of 26.78", 0.02 seconds behind South African Cameron van der Burgh. In the 100 metre breaststroke, Ramsay-Peaty set new Commonwealth Games records in the heats, semi-finals and the final, posting a time of 58.94" to win the gold, 0.34 seconds faster than van der Burgh, who finished second. Olympic champion and world record holder van der Burgh was the favourite to win, but he managed a record time for a British man in the event. In the 200 metre breaststroke, Peaty finished in fourth place, 0.15 seconds off a medal position and 2.72 seconds behind first-placed Scotsman Ross Murdoch. Ramsay-Peaty also won gold in the 4 x 100 metre medley relay with his team of Chris Walker-Hebborn, Adam Barrett and Adam Brown

At the 2014 European Championships, Ramsay-Peaty set his first world record. After winning his heat of the 50 metre breaststroke, he then clocked a new world-record time of 26.62" in the semi-final. He then went on to win gold in the final. He also set a second world record as part of the final of the 4 × 100 metre mixed medley relay, along with Walker-Hebborn, Jemma Lowe and Fran Halsall, with a time of 3':44.02". He also won the gold in the 100 metre breaststroke after winning all 3 of his races and the gold in the 4 x 100 metre medley relay along with Walker-Hebborn, Barrett and Ben Proud, ending the championships having won gold in 4 out of the 5 events he entered after not qualifying for the final of the 200 metre breaststroke. In the 2014 World Short Course Championships, he rounded off his year with three silver medals in 50 metre breaststroke, 100 metre breaststroke and the 4 x 50 metre mixed medley relay, but again didn't qualify for the final of the 200 metre breaststroke.

=== 2015 ===
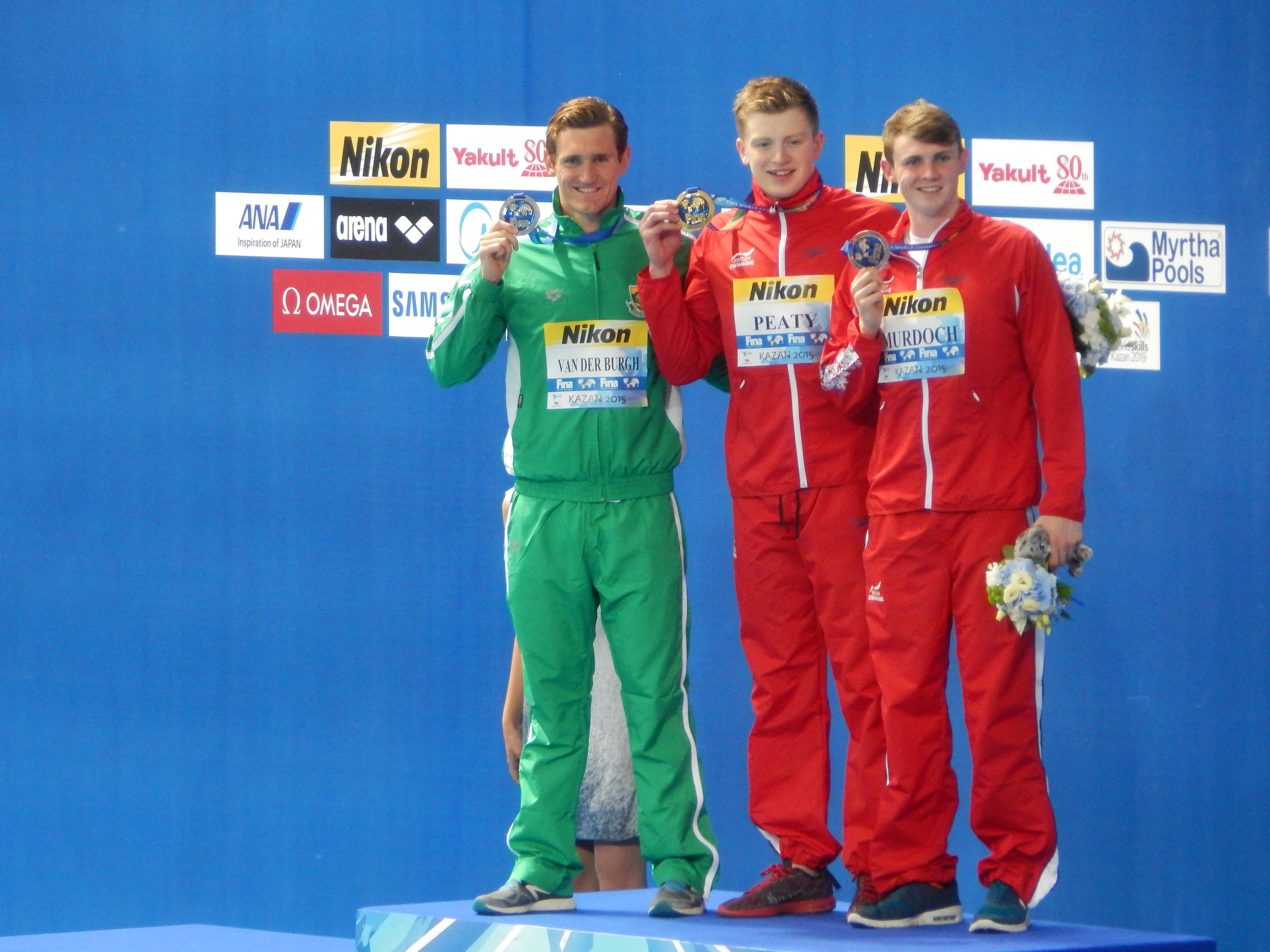
100m breaststroke medal ceremony at Kazan

In 2015, Ramsay-Peaty's rise continued, breaking the world record for 100 metre breaststroke at the British Championships and World Trials by almost half a second. His time of 57.92 seconds made him the first man to go under 58 seconds for the event. He qualified for all three breaststroke events at the 2015 World Aquatic Championships. At the 2015 World Championships, he became a World Champion for the first time.

He won gold in the 100 metre breaststroke after winning both his heat and semi-final in new championship records before beating Cameron van der Burgh in the final, with his British team-mate Ross Murdoch winning the bronze medal. In the 50 metre breaststroke, van der Burgh broke the world record in the heats, Peaty then broke it once more in the semi-finals with a time of 26.42 seconds. Peaty then won the final of the event, which his second gold of the championship with van der Burgh taking silver. Peaty added a third gold with a win in the 4 × 100 metre mixed medley relay with a new world-record time along with Walker-Hebborn, Siobhan-Marie O'Connor and Halsall. His team of Walker-Hebborn, James Guy and Proud finished fourth in the 4 x 100 metre medley relay just missing out on a medal and he did not qualify out of the heats in his weakest event, the 200 metre breaststroke. Peaty rounded off his year by winning two silver medals at the 2015 European Short Course Swimming Championships in the 50 metre breaststroke and 100 metre breaststroke events.

=== 2016 ===
At the 2016 European Championships held in London, Ramsay-Peaty retained both of his individual titles in the 50 metre breaststroke and the 100 metre breaststroke, comfortably winning all of his heat, semi final and final swims and sharing the podium with his teammate Ross Murdoch on both occasions. He also retained both of his relay titles winning the 4 × 100 metre medley relay with Walker-Hebborn, Guy and Duncan Scott, and the mixed 4 × 100 metre medley relay with Walker-Hebborn, O'Connor and Halsall. He did not enter the 200 metre breaststroke event and as of the Olympics held in 2021 had never entered the event again at a major championship.

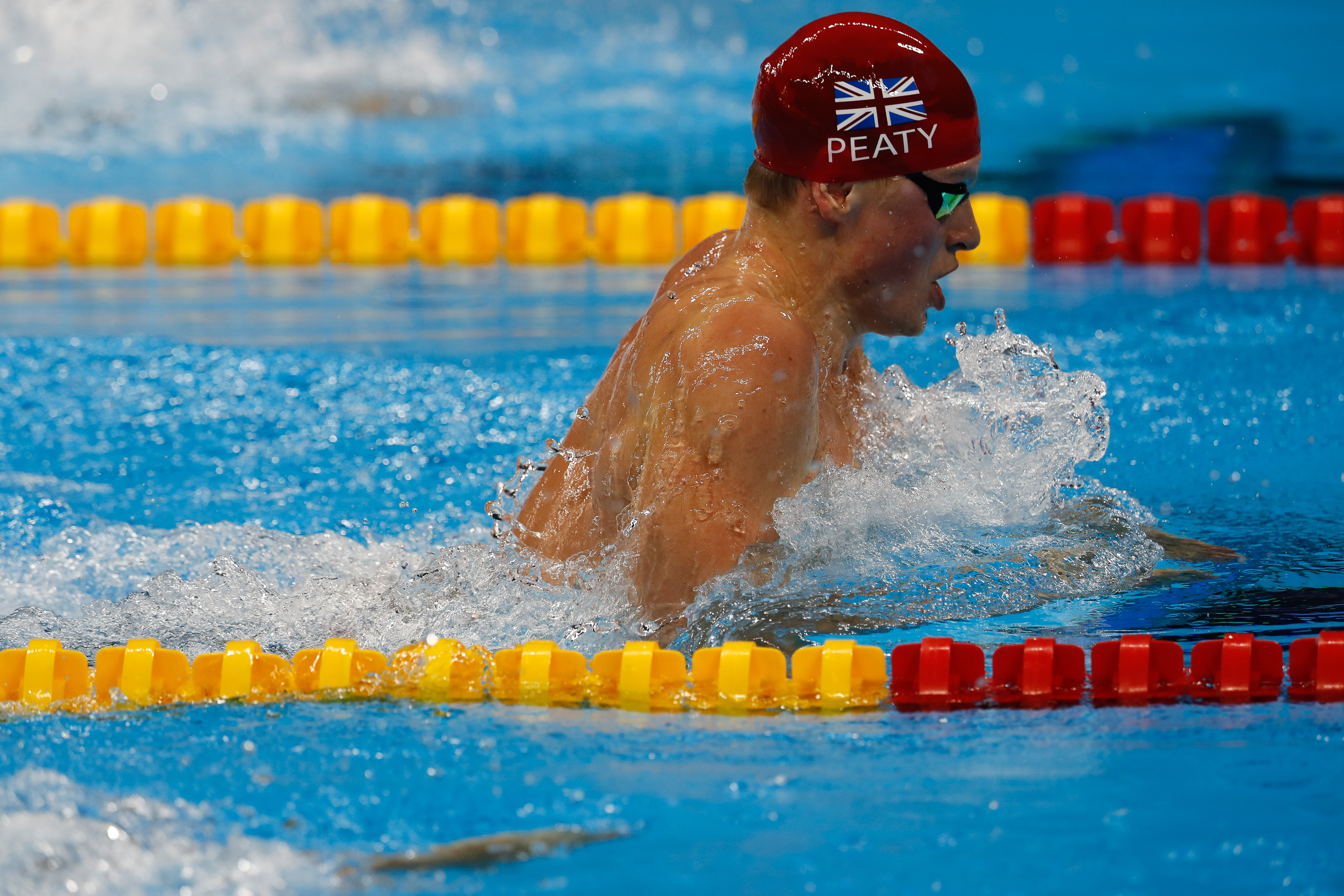
Peaty at the Rio Olympics 100m breaststroke

Peaty only competed in the 100 metre breaststroke in the individual events as 50 metre breaststroke was not an Olympic swimming event at the 2016 Summer Olympics in Rio de Janeiro. In the heats, Peaty broke his own world record with a time of 57.55 seconds. He then won his semi-final and went on to win the final, breaking the new world record that he himself had set in the heats, and winning Team GB's first gold medal of the 2016 Olympics on 7 August 2016, winning with a time of 57.13 seconds. He won a further silver medal in the 4 × 100 metre medley relay with Walker-Hebborn, Guy and Scott.

=== 2017 ===
At the 2017 World Aquatics Championships, Ramsay-Peaty retained his 100 metre breaststroke title. After easily winning his heat and semi-final races, he won in the final winning the race with a championship record of 57.47 seconds. Peaty also broke his own world record twice in the 50 metre breaststroke. He recorded 26.10 seconds in the heats, and in the semi-final, he became the first man to break 26 seconds and won in 25.95 seconds. He successfully defended his 50-metre breaststroke title with another sub-26 time of 25.99 seconds in the final, completing another double at the World Championships with van der Burgh taking bronze. He won a further silver in the 4 × 100 metre medley relay at the World Championship, setting a new British record, with the same Olympic line-up of Walker-Hebborn, Guy and Scott, but missed out on a medal in the 4 x 100 metre mixed medley relay with Davies, Guy and O'Connor despite setting a new European record.

At the 2017 European Short Course Swimming Championships, Ramsay-Peaty won a bronze medal in the 50 metre breaststroke with a personal best time and setting a new British record. He then went on to win gold in the 100 metre breaststroke setting a new European record in the process, his first ever gold medal at a short course event.

=== 2018 ===
At the 2018 Commonwealth Games, Ramsay-Peaty defended his 100 metre breaststroke title, winning in a time of 58.84 seconds after setting a games record time in the semi-final of 58.59, beating his teammate James Wilby in to silver medal position and his old rival van der Burgh in to bronze. However, he finished second in the 50 metre breaststroke behind van der Burgh, the first time he had failed to win a 50-metre breaststroke race for 4 years since he lost to him at the 2014 Commonwealth Games. He also helped his England team win a silver medal in the 4 × 100 metre medley relay with Luke Greenbank, Guy and Proud.

At the 2018 European Championships, Ramsay-Peaty once again defended his European title in the 100 metre breaststroke, beating his own world record with a time recorded as 57.00 seconds, which was corrected to 57.10" the next day. He added a second gold when he won as part of the team in the 4 × 100 metre mixed medley relay with Georgia Davies, Guy and Freya Anderson, and a third in the 50 metre breaststroke setting three championship records in a row to win the gold. He brought his tally at the championships to four golds after winning the 4 × 100 metre medley relay as part of the British team with Nicholas Pyle, Guy and Scott which made him Britain's first three-time quadruple champion at the European Championships. At the end of the European Championships, he held the eleven best times in history for the 50 metre breaststroke and the fourteen best times in the 100 metre breaststroke.

=== 2019 ===
At the 2019 World Aquatics Championships held in Gwangju, South Korea, Ramsay-Peaty broke his own world record in the semi-final of the 100 metre breaststroke with a time of 56.88", and became the first man to break 57 seconds in the event, before anybody else had swum in under 58 seconds. He retained his 100-metre title in the final, after finishing first in front of his training partner James Wilby. He won the gold in the 50 metre breaststroke for the third time, completing the triple double at the World Championships. He also won a bronze in the 4 × 100 metre mixed medley relay with Davies, Guy and Anderson. Peaty made this his most successful world championships yet after winning his third gold in the 4 × 100 metre medley relay together with Greenbank, Guy and Scott, the first gold won by the British team in this event at the Championships. He helped the team finish first in a European record time of 3 minutes, 28.10 seconds to beat the United States.

Ramsay-Peaty competed in the inaugural season of the International Swimming League in 2019 and was one of the main supporters for the league's creation. Peaty was chosen as team captain for London Roar and helped his team reach the grand final in Las Vegas in which they finished in second place, with Peaty having won four out of the eight individual breaststroke events he competed in.

=== 2020 ===
Due to the worldwide COVID-19 pandemic both the 2020 Olympics and 2020 European Championships were postponed until 2021. On 15 November 2020, at the International Swimming League meet in Budapest, Ramsay-Peaty competed as part of the London Roar team. He broke the world record for the short-course 100m breaststroke with a time of 55.49 seconds in the semi-final, which was his first ever world record in short course metres. He then beat his own world record time in the 100m breaststroke one week later, swimming 55.41 seconds in the final. He ended up winning 6 out his 15 individual breaststroke events during the 2020 ISL season, as well as all 3 of the skins races he competed in. In December, Peaty and three fellow 2019 individual world championship medal-winning team-mates were pre-selected for the postponed Tokyo Olympics.

=== 2021 ===
At the 2021 British Swimming Olympic trials, Ramsay-Peaty won the 100m breaststroke title on the opening day of the championships at the London Aquatics Centre in a time of 57.39 seconds. In May 2021, he won his fourth successive gold medals in both the 100m breaststroke and the 50m breaststroke at the European Championships. He also won two further golds as part of the team in the mixed 4 × 100 metre medley and men's 4 × 100 m medley relays.

In July 2021, Ramsay-Peaty became the first British swimmer to defend an Olympic title. He won Britain's first gold medal at the 2020 Tokyo Olympic Games (held in 2021), beating Arno Kamminga of the Netherlands in the 100m breaststroke with a time of 57.37 seconds. He won a second gold in the mixed 4 × 100 metre medley relay, setting a world record time of 3 minutes 37.58 seconds together with Kathleen Dawson, James Guy and Anna Hopkin.

For the 2021 International Swimming League, Ramsay-Peaty was selected to the roster for team London Roar by fan vote. While Peaty remained on the regular and playoffs season rosters, he ultimately decided not to compete in the International Swimming League in 2021 as the league had still not paid him all of the money he earned from the 2020 year.

For the 21st century up to the end of 2021, Ramsay-Peaty had set a total of 11 individual world records in short course and long course metres, ranking as number five behind Michael Phelps, Aaron Peirsol, Ryan Lochte, and Cameron van der Burgh in terms of total number of individual world records achieved by a male swimmer in the century.

=== 2022 ===
In March 2022, Ramsay-Peaty signed a professional sponsorship deal with Speedo. Approximately two months later, he announced that due to a fractured foot that required him to rest for 6 weeks, he would not be participating at the 2022 World Aquatics Championships held in June in Budapest. Peaty returned to compete in the 2022 Commonwealth Games after his injury but was beaten in the final of the 100m breaststroke for the first time in 8 years, finishing fourth behind England team-mate James Wilby and Australians Zac Stubblety-Cook and Sam Williamson. Peaty later said that he didn't know "what went wrong" and that he has "kind of lost that spark". Peaty later went on to win gold in the 50m breaststroke event for the first time at the Commonwealth Games, winning in a time of 26.76 seconds. After the race he said that he has his 'spark back' but did not go on to race in any of the relay events at the championships and also chose to skip the 2022 European Championships.

Later in the year, in December at the 2022 World Short Course Championships in Melbourne, Australia, Peaty won the bronze medal in the 100 metre breaststroke with a time of 56.25 seconds, which was 37-hundredths of a second behind gold medalist Nic Fink and 18-hundredths of a second behind silver medalist Nicolò Martinenghi, and marked the first medal for Great Britain at the Championships. One day earlier in the competition, on 14 December, he helped achieve a fourth-place finish in the 4×50 metre mixed medley relay, splitting a 25.24 to contribute to the final mark of 1:37.07, which set a new British record in the event. On 16 December, he placed eighteenth in the 200 metre breaststroke with a time of 2:07.31. For his final event of the Championships, the 50 metre breaststroke, he finished in a time of 25.99 seconds in the final to place sixth.

=== 2024 ===
After winning the 100 metres breaststroke at the 2024 Aquatics GB Swimming Championships, Peaty sealed his place at the 2024 Summer Olympics. At the 2024 Summer Olympics in Paris, Peaty won the silver medal in the 100m breaststroke, finishing tied with Nic Fink and behind Nicolò Martinenghi. It was revealed the next day that Peaty was feeling slightly unwell before the final, and tested positive for Covid the morning after the final.

== Personal life ==
While training at Loughborough University, Ramsay-Peaty met student Eirianedd Munro. Their son was born in September 2020. In August 2022, he announced that they were no longer together.

Ramsay-Peaty married Holly Ramsay, daughter of celebrity chef Gordon Ramsay, at Bath Abbey in December 2025. A family dispute resulted in most of Peaty's relatives being uninvited from the ceremony, with only his sister attending. In June 2026, the couple announced that they were expecting their first child together, a daughter.

Ramsay-Peaty is a football fan, and supports Nottingham Forest. Among his many tattoos are an image of the Greek god Poseidon and the year 2016 in Roman numerals (MMXVI).

On 1 April 2016, Ramsay-Peaty started a YouTube channel, to which he published a number of videos; the first one on 14 April 2017 answered some common questions about himself. From September to November 2021, Peaty was a contestant on the nineteenth series of Strictly Come Dancing. Paired with professional dancer Katya Jones, he reached week seven coming in 9th place overall. For his time, efforts, and ninth-place finish, Peaty earned £40,000 directly. In April 2023, Peaty withdrew from the British Swimming Championships and revealed that he was struggling with his mental health. He revealed that he had depression, problems with alcohol, and had been diagnosed with ADHD.

In an interview with journalist Craig Lord for The Times in 2023, Ramsay-Peaty revealed that he was taking time away from racing because of the mental-health pressures, demons and doubts he had faced after almost a decade as the fastest breaststroke swimmer in history. He continued to train for the Paris 2024 Olympic Games, telling The Times: "The physical preparation goes on so my body will be ready to fight again when my heart and mind have caught up. I'll be ready when I need to be ready."

During 2023, Ramsay-Peaty became a Christian after connecting with Ashley Null, a sports chaplain. In 2024, he revealed a prominent Christian cross tattoo on his stomach and said, "For me, the only fulfilment and the only peace is every Sunday at church."

Ramsay-Peaty questioned China's performances at the 2024 Summer Olympics, alluding to the cover-up of positive doping cases by Chinese swimmers, and expressing dissatisfaction with the World Anti-Doping Agency's efforts to combat cheating in sports.

== Physical attributes ==
Ramsay-Peaty is physiologically particularly adapted to swimming the breast stroke; he has been described, like Michael Phelps, as "an anatomical freak". He is tall at 1.91 m (6 ft 3 in), with large hands and feet (shoe size 12), and has hypermobile knees and ankles. As his knees hyperextend he can kick particularly effectively; his ankles help by flexing in a way other people's ankles do not. He has also been described as having an "extraordinary" cardiovascular system.

== Awards and honours ==
Ramsay-Peaty received the FINA award for Best Male Swimming Performance of 2015 after he won 3 gold medals at the World Championships in Kazan. In 2016, he was again honoured by FINA for the best male Olympic swimming performance of the year award after breaking the 100m breaststroke world record at the 2016 Olympics. Peaty has won the Ligue Européenne de Natation (LEN) Award for best male swimmer for three times in four years for his performances in 2016, 2017 and 2019. He was the recipient of the award again in 2021.

Ramsay-Peaty was named Male World Swimmer of the Year by Swimming World Magazine in 2015 and 2018. He also won Male European Swimmer of the Year for 6 consecutive years from 2014 to 2019. In August 2021, following the close of swimming at the 2020 Summer Olympics, Peaty and his mixed 4x100 metre medley relay teammates winning the gold medal and setting a new world record in the event was chosen as the number five moment at the 2020 Olympic Games in the sport of swimming by Olympics.com.

For the 2021 year, Ramsay-Peaty received the Sportsman of the Year award from the Sports Journalists' Association. Peaty was appointed Member of the Order of the British Empire (MBE) in the 2017 New Year Honours and Officer of the Order of the British Empire (OBE) in the 2022 New Year Honours, both for services to swimming.

== International championships (50 m) ==
Meet	50 breaststroke	100 breaststroke	200 breaststroke	4×100 medley	4×100 mixed medley
Junior level
EJC 2012	12th (h)	8th (h)	5th	4th	—N/a
Senior level
CG 2014	2nd place, silver medalist(s)	1st place, gold medalist(s)	4th	1st place, gold medalist(s)	—N/a
EC 2014	1st place, gold medalist(s)	1st place, gold medalist(s)	8th (h)	1st place, gold medalist(s)	1st place, gold medalist(s)
WC 2015	1st place, gold medalist(s)	1st place, gold medalist(s)	26th	4th	1st place, gold medalist(s)
EC 2016	1st place, gold medalist(s)	1st place, gold medalist(s)		1st place, gold medalist(s)	1st place, gold medalist(s)
OG 2016	—N/a	1st place, gold medalist(s)		2nd place, silver medalist(s)	—N/a
WC 2017	1st place, gold medalist(s)	1st place, gold medalist(s)		2nd place, silver medalist(s)	5th
CG 2018	2nd place, silver medalist(s)	1st place, gold medalist(s)		2nd place, silver medalist(s)	—N/a
EC 2018	1st place, gold medalist(s)	1st place, gold medalist(s)		1st place, gold medalist(s)	1st place, gold medalist(s)
WC 2019	1st place, gold medalist(s)	1st place, gold medalist(s)		1st place, gold medalist(s)	3rd place, bronze medalist(s)
EC 2020	1st place, gold medalist(s)	1st place, gold medalist(s)		1st place, gold medalist(s)	1st place, gold medalist(s)
OG 2020	—N/a	1st place, gold medalist(s)		2nd place, silver medalist(s)	1st place, gold medalist(s)
CG 2022	1st place, gold medalist(s)	4th			
WC 2024	4th	3rd place, bronze medalist(s)			3rd place, bronze medalist(s)
OG 2024	—N/a	2nd place, silver medalist(s)		4th	
CG 2026	3rd place, bronze medalist(s)	3rd place, bronze medalist(s)		2nd place, silver medalist(s)	5th
EC 2026	20th (h)	5th		4th	4th

== International championships (25 m) ==
Meet	50 breaststroke	100 breaststroke	200 breaststroke	4×50 medley	4×100 medley	4×50 mixed medley
EC 2013	11th	9th (h)	26th		—N/a	5th^{[a]}
WC 2014	2nd place, silver medalist(s)	2nd place, silver medalist(s)	14th	5th	5th	2nd place, silver medalist(s)
EC 2015	2nd place, silver medalist(s)	2nd place, silver medalist(s)	13th		—N/a	
EC 2017	3rd place, bronze medalist(s)	1st place, gold medalist(s)	13th		—N/a	
WC 2022	6th	3rd place, bronze medalist(s)	18th			4th

^{a} Ramsay-Peaty swam only in the preliminaries.

== Career best times ==
=== Long course metres ===
Event	Time		Meet	Location	Date	Notes
50 m breaststroke	25.95	sf	2017 World Aquatics Championships	Budapest, Hungary	25 July 2017	WR
100 m breaststroke	56.88	sf	2019 World Aquatics Championships	Gwangju, South Korea	21 July 2019	WR
200 m breaststroke	2:08.34		2015 British Swimming Championships	London, United Kingdom	14 April 2015	

Legend: WR – World record; e – equalled existing record;
Records not set in finals: h – heat; sf – semifinal; r – relay 1st leg; rh – relay heat 1st leg; b – B final; † – en route to final mark; so – swim-off; tt – time trial

=== Short course metres ===
Event	Time	Meet	Location	Date	Notes
50 m breaststroke	25.41	2020 International Swimming League	Budapest, Hungary	22 November 2020	NR
100 m breaststroke	55.41	2020 International Swimming League	Budapest, Hungary	22 November 2020	CR, Former WR
200 m breaststroke	2:02.89	2020 International Swimming League	Budapest, Hungary	21 November 2020	

Legend: WR – World record; CR – Commonwealth record; NR – British record; e – equalled existing record;
Records not set in finals: h – heat; sf – semifinal; r – relay 1st leg; rh – relay heat 1st leg; b – B final; † – en route to final mark; so – swim-off; tt – time trial

== World records ==
=== Long course metres ===
No.	Event	Time	Meet	Location	Date	Status
1	50 m breaststroke	26.62	2014 European Championships	Berlin, Germany	18 August 2014	Former
2	4×100 m mixed medley relay	3:44.02	2014 European Championships	Berlin, Germany	19 August 2014	Former
3	100 m breaststroke	57.92	2015 British Swimming Championships	London, United Kingdom	17 April 2015	Former
4	50 m breaststroke (2)	26.42	2015 World Championships	Kazan, Russia	4 August 2015	Former
5	4×100 m mixed medley relay (2)	3:41.71	2015 World Championships	Kazan, Russia	5 August 2015	Former
6	100 m breaststroke (2)	57.55	2016 Summer Olympics	Rio de Janeiro, Brazil	6 August 2016	Former
7	100 m breaststroke (3)	57.13	2016 Summer Olympics	Rio de Janeiro, Brazil	7 August 2016	Former
8	50 m breaststroke (3)	26.10	2017 World Championships	Budapest, Hungary	25 July 2017	Former
9	50 m breaststroke (4)	25.95	2017 World Championships	Budapest, Hungary	25 July 2017	Current
10	100 m breaststroke (4)	57.10	2018 European Championships	Glasgow, United Kingdom	4 August 2018	Former
11	100 m breaststroke (5)	56.88	2019 World Championships	Gwangju, South Korea	21 July 2019	Current
12	4×100 m mixed medley relay (3)	3:37.58	2020 Summer Olympics	Tokyo, Japan	31 July 2021	Current

=== Short course metres ===
No.	Event	Time	Meet	Location	Date	Status
1	100 m breaststroke	55.49	2020 International Swimming League	Budapest, Hungary	15 November 2020	Former
2	100 m breaststroke (2)	55.41	2020 International Swimming League	Budapest, Hungary	22 November 2020	Former

== Bibliography ==
- Peaty, Adam with Richard Waters. The Gladiator Mindset: Push Your Limits. Overcome Challenges. Achieve Your Goals. London, Quercus, 11 November 2021. ISBN 978-1-52941-842-2.

== See also ==
- World record progression 50 metres breaststroke
- World record progression 100 metres breaststroke
- World record progression 4 × 100 metres medley relay
- World and Olympic records set at the 2016 Summer Olympics
- World and Olympic records set at the 2020 Summer Olympics

Records
Preceded by (South Africa) Cameron van der Burgh	World Record Holder; Men's 50-metre breaststroke 22 August 2014*–present	Succeeded by Incumbent
Preceded by (South Africa) Cameron van der Burgh	World Record Holder; Men's 100-metre breaststroke 17 April 2015–present	Succeeded by Incumbent
Preceded by (South Africa) Cameron van der Burgh	World Record Holder; Men's 100-metre breaststroke (short course); 15 November 2020–19 December 2020	Succeeded by (Belarus) Ilya Shymanovich
Awards
Preceded by Dániel Gyurta	European Swimmer of the Year; 2014–2019	Succeeded by Evgeny Rylov
Preceded by Kosuke Hagino; Caeleb Dressel	World Swimmer of the Year; 2015; 2018	Succeeded by Michael Phelps; Caeleb Dressel
