= Peter John Stevens =

Slovenian swimmer (born 1995)

Personal information
- National team: Slovenia
- Born: 1 June 1995 (age 31) Kranj, Slovenia
- Height: 1.96 m (6 ft 5 in)
- Weight: 92 kg (203 lb)

Sport
- Sport: Swimming
- Strokes: Breaststroke
- College team: University of Tennessee
Medal record
Men's swimming
Representing Slovenia
World Championships (SC)
Silver medal – second place	2016 Windsor	50 m breaststroke
European Championships (LC)
Silver medal – second place	2016 London	50 m breaststroke
Bronze medal – third place	2018 Glasgow	50 m breaststroke
Mediterranean Games
Bronze medal – third place	2018 Tarragona	50 m breaststroke
Bronze medal – third place	2022 Oran	50 m breaststroke

Peter John Stevens (born 1 June 1995) is a Slovenian swimmer.

He won the title of youth world champion in the 50-metre breaststroke in 2013. In 2016, he won silver in the same discipline seconds at the 50-metre breaststroke on the European Aquatic Championships in London, with time of 27.09 seconds. This was his first medal from a senior competition. In 2016, he won the silver medal at the 50 m breaststroke on the short-course World Swimming Championships, breaking the Slovenian national record at 25.85.

Stevens is son of an English father and Slovenian mother. His family lives in Medvode. As of 2014 he is a student at the University of Tennessee.

== International Swimming League ==
In 2019 he was member of the 2019 International Swimming League representing Team Iron. He was co-captain of the team alongside Katinka Hosszú.
