= Jason Block =

Canadian swimmer

Personal information
- Full name: Jason Robert Block
- Born: December 28, 1989 (age 36) Calgary, Alberta, Canada
- Height: 182 cm (6 ft 0 in)

Sport
- Country: Canada
- Sport: Swimming
- Club: University of Calgary Swim Club
- Coach: Dave Salo

Jason Block (born December 28, 1989) is a Canadian competitive swimmer.

In 2016, he was named to Canada's Olympic team for the 2016 Summer Olympics.
