= Jolann Bovey =

Swiss swimmer

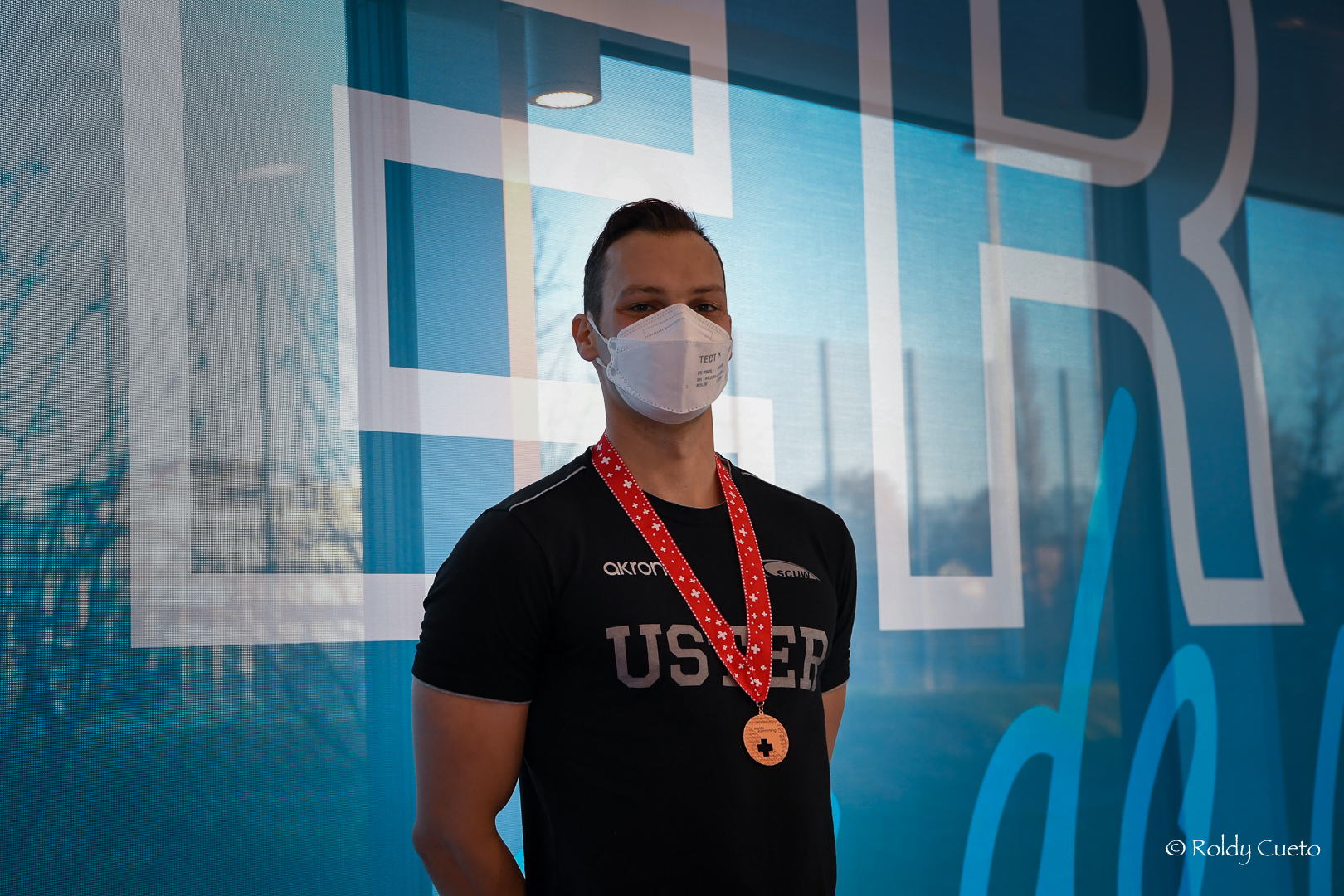

Personal information
- Nationality: Swiss
- Born: 17 March 1996 (age 30) Lausanne, Switzerland
- Height: 188 cm (6 ft 2 in)
- Weight: 87 kg (192 lb)

Sport
- Sport: Swimming
- Strokes: Breaststroke
- Club: Schwimmclub Uster-Wallisellen / Bærumsvømmerne

Jolann Bovey (born 17 March 1996) is a Swiss breaststroke swimmer. He is the first Swiss to break the 59 seconds on the 100m breaststroke short course (25m), by swimming 58.96 at the 2017 European Short Course Championship in Copenhagen, a few days later he went on to break his national record one more time at his home pool in Lausanne at the 2nd Lausanne Swim Cup, hitting the wall in 58,78 seconds. His first international championship was in 2016 where he raced in the 50 and 100m breaststroke at the 2016 European aquatic championships in London. In 2017 he participated at the 29th Summer Universiade (World University Games) held in Taipei where he ended at the 17th place on the 200m breaststroke. He competed at his first world championships in the men's 50 metre breaststroke event at the 2018 FINA World Swimming Championships (25 m), in Hangzhou, China.
