= Nicholas Quinn =

Irish swimmer

Personal information
- Nationality: Irish
- Born: 3 June 1993 (age 33) Castlebar, Ireland
- Height: 6 ft 1 in (185 cm)
- Weight: 172 lb (78 kg)

Sport
- Sport: Swimming

Nicholas Quinn (born 3 June 1993) is an Irish swimmer. He competed in the men's 100 metre breaststroke event at the 2016 Summer Olympics. He also competed in the Men's 200 metre breaststroke finishing in 19th place.
