= Julian Fletcher =

Bermudian swimmer (born 1990)

Personal information
- Born: 8 October 1990 (age 35) Paget, Bermuda

Sport
- Sport: Swimming

Julian Fletcher (born 8 October 1990) is a Bermudian swimmer. He competed in the men's 100 metre breaststroke event at the 2016 Summer Olympics, where he ranked 40th with a time of 1:02.73. He did not advance to the final.
