= Ross Murdoch =

British swimmer

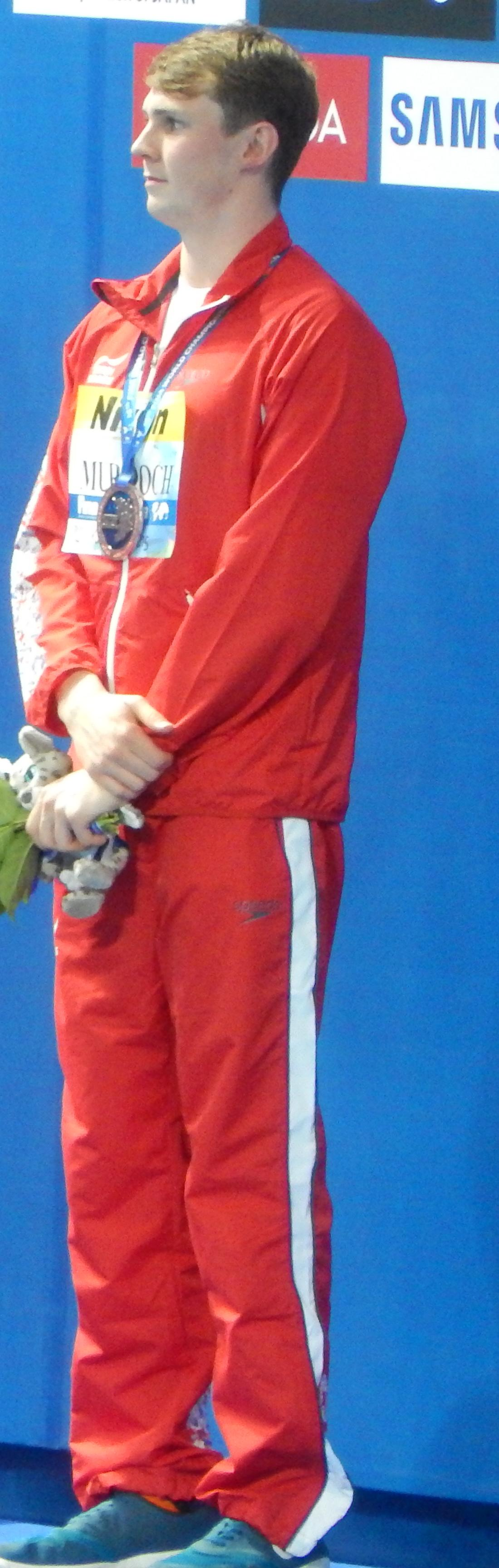

Personal information
- Full name: Ross Murdoch
- National team: Great Britain; Scotland
- Born: 14 January 1994 (age 32) Balloch, West Dunbartonshire, Scotland
- Height: 1.83 m (6 ft 0 in)
- Weight: 76 kg (168 lb)

Sport
- Sport: Swimming
- Strokes: Breaststroke
- Club: University of Stirling
- Coach: Steven Tigg, Bradley Hay
Medal record
Men's swimming
Representing Great Britain
World Championships (LC)
Gold medal – first place	2015 Kazan	4×100 m mixed medley
Silver medal – second place	2017 Budapest	4×100 m medley
Bronze medal – third place	2015 Kazan	100 m breaststroke
European Championships (LC)
Gold medal – first place	2016 London	200 m breaststroke
Gold medal – first place	2016 London	4×100 m medley
Silver medal – second place	2014 Berlin	100 m breaststroke
Silver medal – second place	2014 Berlin	200 m breaststroke
Silver medal – second place	2016 London	100 m breaststroke
Bronze medal – third place	2016 London	50 m breaststroke
European Junior Championships
Silver medal – second place	2012 Antwerp	50 m breaststroke
Silver medal – second place	2012 Antwerp	200 m breaststroke
Representing Scotland
Commonwealth Games
Gold medal – first place	2014 Glasgow	200 m breaststroke
Silver medal – second place	2018 Gold Coast	200 m breaststroke
Bronze medal – third place	2014 Glasgow	100 m breaststroke
Bronze medal – third place	2022 Birmingham	200 m breaststroke
Bronze medal – third place	2022 Birmingham	50 m breaststroke
Bronze medal – third place	2022 Birmingham	4×100 m medley

Ross Murdoch (born 14 January 1994) is a Scottish competitive swimmer who has represented Great Britain at the Summer Olympics in 2016 and 2020, the FINA World Championships and the LEN European Championships, and Scotland at the Commonwealth Games from 2014 to the present. Between 2014 and 2016, Murdoch became a World, European and Commonwealth champion.

Murdoch rose to prominence when he won the gold medal in the 200 metre breaststroke at the 2014 Commonwealth Games in Glasgow, beating favourite, Olympic silver medalist and fellow Scot Michael Jamieson. In 2015, he formed part of the Great Britain squad that won gold in the mixed 4 x 100 metre medley relay at the 2015 World Aquatics Championships, swimming in the qualifying heats, and adding a relay world title to the individual bronze won days earlier in the men's 100 metre breaststroke behind teammate Adam Peaty. In 2016, he qualified for the 100m breaststroke for the Great Britain team in the 2016 Summer Olympics in Rio de Janeiro. In the same year, he won his first European title with a gold medal in the 200 metre breaststroke, also picking up a silver medal in the 100 metre breaststroke silver medal behind teammate Adam Peaty and a bronze medal in the 50 metre breaststroke.

== Swimming career ==
Ross' first notable performance was in the 200 m breaststroke final at the British Gas Swimming Championships 2012 where he achieved a seven-second personal best at the London Aquatics Centre.

In 2013, Ross made his senior international debut at the World Championships in Barcelona, in which he placed 30th in the 50 m breaststroke in 28.00 and advanced to the semi-finals in the 100 m breaststroke, placing 11th in 1:00.07. Ross was also selected for the British 4×100 m Medley Relay which came 9th in the Championships.

In 2014 Ross had international success with Gold in Austin Grand Prix for both the 100 m and 200 m breaststroke as well as taking Gold in the 100 m breaststroke in the Flanders Speedo Cup, receiving the award for top male swimmer due to achieving the highest number of FINA points. In the Scottish National Championships and Commonwealth Trials, Ross picked up two Golds and a Silver medal, achieving a Scottish record in the 100 m of 59.75 which he since improved to 59.56 at the British Championships 2014. In 2015, he claimed the bronze medal in the 100m breaststroke, placing third behind fellow British teammate Adam Peaty and South African Cameron Van Der Burgh with a time of 59.09.

He is currently coached by Ben Higson, although predominantly coached by Jimmy Orr of West Dunbartonshire through his youth and is mentored by Rebecca Adlington

=== International Swimming League ===
In 2019 Murdoch was member of the 2019 International Swimming League representing Team Iron.

== Commonwealth Games ==
=== 2014 ===
In July 2014, Murdoch competed in the 2014 Commonwealth Games which were held in his home city of Glasgow, Scotland. He qualified (coming first) for the final of the 200 metre breaststroke with fellow Scots, favourite Michael Jamieson and Calum Tait. He won the Men's 200 metre final, beating Jamieson and Tait at the Tollcross Swimming Centre. This was his first major gold medal. On the second day of the 2014 Commonwealth Games, he qualified as the second fastest swimmer for the 100 metre breaststroke in a time of 59.72, only behind Adam Peaty who swam a time of 59.16 seconds. In the final, Murdoch won the bronze medal with a time of 59.47 seconds. He also qualified for the final of the 50 metre breaststroke, placing 6th in the final.

=== 2022 ===
At the 2022 Commonwealth Games, held starting in July in Birmingham, England, Murdoch won a bronze medal in the 200 metre breaststroke on the first day of swimming competition with a time of 2:10.41. His achievement followed an eleven week retirement from swimming, that started in December 2021 and during which time he did not even get in a pool. Four days later, he won the bronze medal in the 50 metre breaststroke with a time of 27.32 seconds. The following day, he won a bronze medal as part of the 4×100 metre medley relay, splitting a 59.59 for the breaststroke leg of the relay in the final and contributing to a new Scottish record time of 3:35.11. His medals helped to tie the all-time performance record by swimmers representing Scotland at a single Commonwealth Games in terms of total medals won, a record of 12 total medals previously set at the 2006 Commonwealth Games.

== 2016 & 2020 Olympic Games ==
Ross finished 9th in the 100m breaststroke at the 2016 Olympic Games in Rio with a time of 1:00.05. During the 2020 Olympic games in Tokyo, Ross finished 12th in the 200m breaststroke.

== Personal life ==
Murdoch started swimming in Alexandria in West Dunbartonshire, close to his hometown of Balloch, when he was 6 years old. He stated his father as being inspirational as he pushed him to achieve success. He was a pupil of Balfron High School. He has a younger sister, Heather, and a younger brother, Scott.
