= Filipp Provorkov =

Estonian swimmer

Personal information
- Born: 15 April 1988 (age 38) Tallinn, then part of Estonian SSR, Soviet Union
- Height: 191 cm (6 ft 3 in)

Sport
- Sport: Swimming

Filipp Provorkov (born 15 April 1988) is an Estonian swimmer. He competed in the men's 50 metre breaststroke event at the 2017 World Aquatics Championships.
