= Damir Dugonjič =

Slovenian swimmer (born 1988)

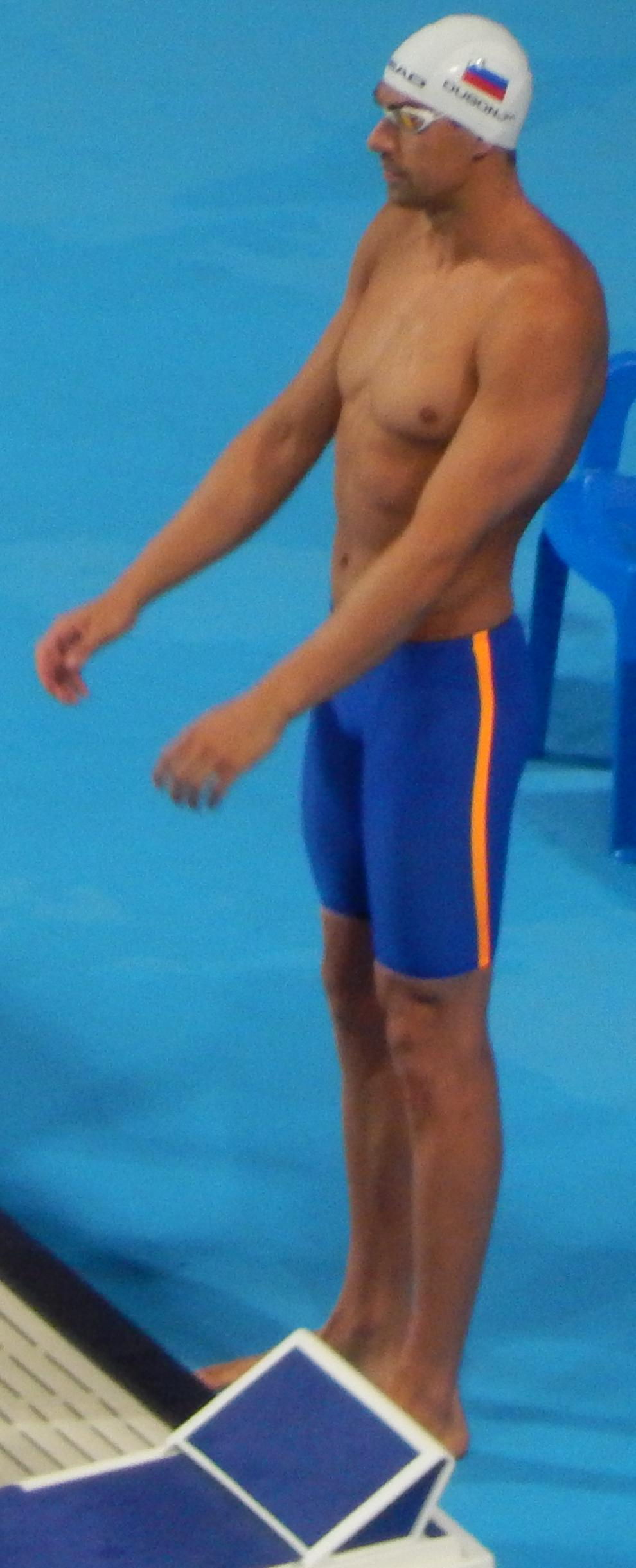
- Kazan 2015

Personal information
- National team: Slovenia
- Born: 21 February 1988 (age 38) Ravne na Koroškem, SFR Yugoslavia
- Height: 2.02 m (6 ft 8 in)
- Weight: 105 kg (231 lb)

Sport
- Sport: Swimming
- Strokes: Breaststroke
- College team: University of California, Berkeley (U.S.)
Medal record
Men's swimming
Representing Slovenia
World Championships (SC)
Silver medal – second place	2012 Istanbul	50 m breaststroke
Silver medal – second place	2012 Istanbul	100 m breaststroke
European Championships (LC)
Gold medal – first place	2012 Debrecen	50 m breaststroke
Bronze medal – third place	2014 Berlin	50 m breaststroke
European Championships (SC)
Gold medal – first place	2013 Herning	50 m breaststroke
Gold medal – first place	2015 Netanya	50 m breaststroke
Silver medal – second place	2011 Szczecin	50 m breaststroke
Silver medal – second place	2011 Szczecin	100 m breaststroke
Silver medal – second place	2012 Chartres	4×50 m mixed medley
Bronze medal – third place	2012 Chartres	50 m breaststroke
Bronze medal – third place	2013 Herning	100 m breaststroke
Mediterranean Games
Gold medal – first place	2013 Mersin	50 m breaststroke

Damir Dugonjič (born 21 February 1988) is a Slovenian swimmer who competed for his native country at the 2008, 2012 and 2016 Summer Olympics. He competed in 100 metre breaststroke in all three Games, where he finished 16th, 18th and 21st respectively.

He attended school and swam for the USA's University of California, Berkeley from 2007 to 2011. At the 2010 NCAA Division I Men's Swimming & Diving Championships, he won the 100 breaststroke.
