= Yannick Käser =

Swiss swimmer

Personal information
- Nicknames: Käsi, Pigeon
- Nationality: Switzerland
- Born: 3 July 1992 (age 34) Rheinfelden, Aargau, Switzerland
- Height: 1.87 m (6 ft 1 1/2 in)
- Weight: 73 kg (161 lb)

Sport
- Sport: Swimming
- Strokes: Breaststroke
- Club: Limmat Sharks (SUI)
- College team: Virginia Cavaliers (USA)
- Coach: Dieter Sofka

Yannick Käser (born 3 July 1992 in Rheinfelden, Aargau) is a Swiss swimmer, specializing in breaststroke events. He is a 7-time Swiss swimming champion, a multiple-time age-group record holder, and a member of the swimming team for Virginia Cavaliers. He is also training with Limmat Sharks in Zurich under his coach Dirk Reinicke. He used to train with coach Dieter Sofka up to 2011.

Kaeser made his international debut at the 2010 Summer Youth Olympics in Singapore, where he placed sixth in the 200 m breaststroke with his personal best of 2:17.78. In 2011, he cleared the 2:10 barrier to set a short-course Swiss record of 2:09.99 in the same stroke at the European Championships in Szczecin, Poland.

Kaeser qualified for the men's 200 m breaststroke at the 2012 Summer Olympics in London, by breaking a long-course Swiss record and eclipsing a FINA B-cut of 2:12.09 from the European Championships in Debrecen, Hungary. He challenged seven other swimmers on the fourth heat, including top medal favorites Clark Burckle of the United States and Ryo Tateishi of Japan. Kaeser rounded out the field to last place by more than a second behind Hungary's Ákos Molnár in 2:13.49. Kaeser failed to advance into the semifinals, as he placed twenty-fourth overall in the preliminary heats.

Two weeks after the Olympics, Kaeser later admitted that he officially enrolled on a full academic scholarship at the University of Virginia in Charlottesville, Virginia, majoring in commerce. For four years of his academic eligibility, he trained under coach Clif Robbins.

Swimming for the Cavaliers, Kaeser achieved multiple NCAA All-American honors. He is the current UVa school record holder in the 100 breaststroke with a time of 52.47 and in the 200 breaststroke with a time of 1:53.41. He continues to swim internationally for the Swiss National Team. Most recently, Kaeser competed in the European Long Course Championship held in Glasgow in 2018. He competed in the 100 breaststroke, finishing 22nd with a time of 1:01.08. He placed 21st in the 200 breast with a time of 2:13.66. On the last day of the competition, Yannick placed 30th, swimming a 28.28.
