= Čaba Silađi =

Serbian swimmer

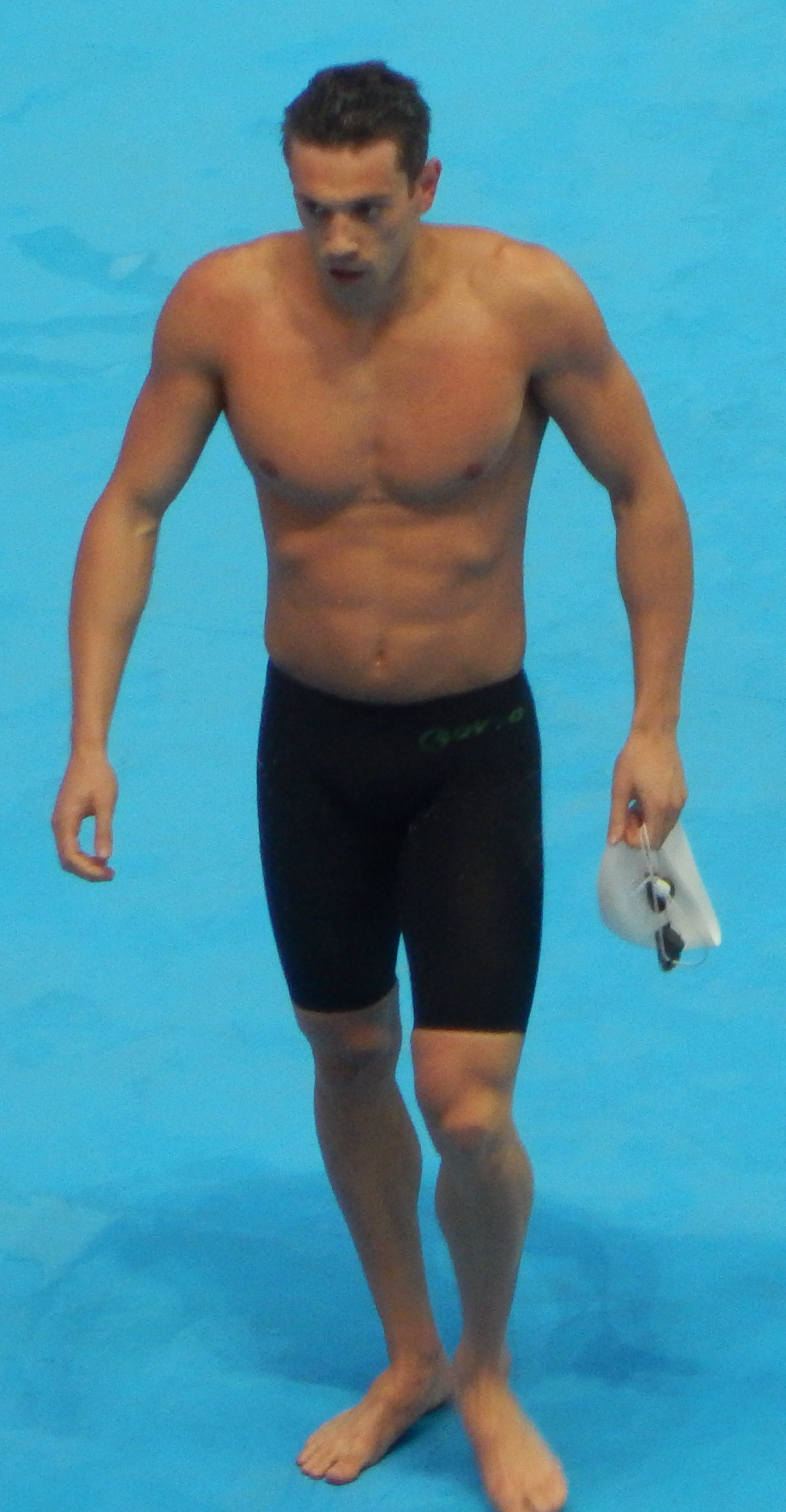
- Kazan 2015

Personal information
- Full name: Čaba Silađi
- Nationality: Serbia
- Born: 23 August 1990 (age 35) Senta, SR Serbia, SFR Yugoslavia
- Height: 1.84 m (6 ft 1/2 in)
- Weight: 75 kg (165 lb)

Sport
- Sport: Swimming
- Strokes: Breaststroke
- Club: Proleter Zrenjanin
Medal record
Men's swimming
European SC Championships
Bronze medal – third place	2009 Istanbul	50 m breaststroke
Mediterranean Games
Silver medal – second place	2009 Pescara	100 m breaststroke
Silver medal – second place	2018 Tarragona	50 m breaststroke
Silver medal – second place	2018 Tarragona	100 m breaststroke
Silver medal – second place	2018 Tarragona	4×100 m medley
Bronze medal – third place	2009 Pescara	50 m breaststroke
Bronze medal – third place	2013 Mersin	50 m breaststroke
Universiade
Gold medal – first place	2015 Gwangju	50 m breaststroke
Bronze medal – third place	2009 Belgrade	50 m breaststroke
World Junior Championship
Silver medal – second place	2006 Rio de Janeiro	50 m breaststroke
Silver medal – second place	2008 Monterrey	50 m breaststroke
Bronze medal – third place	2008 Monterrey	100 m breaststroke
European Junior Championships
Gold medal – first place	2008 Belgrade	100 m breaststroke
Silver medal – second place	2007 Antwerp	50 m breaststroke
Silver medal – second place	2008 Belgrade	50 m breaststroke

Čaba Silađi (Hungarian: Szilágyi Csaba, Serbian Cyrillic: Чаба Силађи; born 23 August 1990) is a Serbian swimmer of Hungarian ethnicity. Silađi mainly competes in the breaststroke.

Silađi's hometown Senta is a centre of Hungarians in Vojvodina, though competing for Serbia, Silađi goes by the Serbian form of his name. His name also appears transliterated as Caba Siladji in English sports sources.

== Career ==
Silađi finished elementary school and gymnasium in Bečej. He began to practice swimming since 1997, and until 2004 he also trained water polo alongside. He lives and trains in Zrenjanin.

His first international competition was European Short Course Swimming Championships 2007 in Debrecen. He made a lot of remarkable results at World and European junior championships. At the 2008 FINA Youth World Swimming Championships he won silver (50m breaststroke) and bronze medal (100m breaststroke).

He was in the Serbian team at the 2008 Summer Olympics in Beijing. At the 2009 Mediterranean Games in Pescara he won silver (100m breaststroke) and bronze medal (50m breaststroke). Silađi competed at 2009 Summer Universiade in Belgrade, and won bronze medal at 50m breaststroke. He also participated in the semifinals at the 2009 World Aquatics Championships in Rome and 2010 European Aquatics Championships in Budapest.

At the 2009 European Short Course Swimming Championships he won his first senior medal, bronze in the 50 breaststroke.

Silađi also competed at the 2012 Summer Olympics in London and the 2016 Summer Olympics in Rio de Janeiro.

== See also ==
- List of swimmers
- List of European Short Course Swimming Championships medalists (men)
- List of Serbian records in swimming
