= Iceland at the 2025 World Aquatics Championships =

- Flag of Iceland
- World Aquatics code: ISL
- National federation: Sundsamband Íslands
- Website: www.sundsamband.is

in Singapore
- Competitors: 5 in 1 sport
- Medals: Gold 0 Silver 0 Bronze 0 Total 0

World Aquatics Championships appearances
- 1973; 1975; 1978; 1982; 1986; 1991; 1994; 1998; 2001; 2003; 2005; 2007; 2009; 2011; 2013; 2015; 2017; 2019; 2022; 2023; 2024; 2025

Iceland will compete at the 2025 World Aquatics Championships in Singapore from July 11 to August 3, 2025.

== Swimming ==
Icelandic swimmers have achieved qualifying standards in the following events.

Men

Athlete	Event	Heat		Semifinal		Final	
Athlete	Event	Time	Rank	Time	Rank	Time	Rank
Einar Margeir Ágústsson	50 m breaststroke	27.89	40	Did not advance			
Einar Margeir Ágústsson	100 m breaststroke	1:01.64	37	Did not advance			
Birnir Freyr Hálfdánarson	50 m butterfly	24.29	47	Did not advance			
Birnir Freyr Hálfdánarson	100 m butterfly	54.59	49	Did not advance			
Guðmundur Leo Rafnsson	100 m backstroke	56.71	46	Did not advance			
Guðmundur Leo Rafnsson	200 m backstroke	2:03.36	38	Did not advance			

Women

Athlete	Event	Heat		Semifinal		Final	
Athlete	Event	Time	Rank	Time	Rank	Time	Rank
Jóhanna Elín Guðmundsdóttir	50 m freestyle	25.98	42	Did not advance			
Jóhanna Elín Guðmundsdóttir	100 m butterfly	1:01.70	41	Did not advance			
Snæfríður Jórunnardóttir	100 m freestyle	55.31	29	Did not advance			
Snæfríður Jórunnardóttir	200 m freestyle	1:59.11	23	Did not advance			

Mixed

Athlete	Event	Heat		Final	
Athlete	Event	Time	Rank	Time	Rank
Birnir Freyr Hálfdánarson; Guðmundur Leo Rafnsson; Snæfríður Jórunnardóttir; Jóhanna Elín Guðmundsdóttir	4 × 100 m freestyle relay	3:34.65 NR	20	Did not advance	
Guðmundur Leo Rafnsson; Einar Margeir Ágústsson; Jóhanna Elín Guðmundsdóttir; Snæfríður Jórunnardóttir	4 × 100 m medley relay	3:56.02	20	Did not advance	
