= Swimming at the 2024 Summer Olympics – Men's 200-metre breaststroke =

Swimming at the 2024 Olympics

Men's 200 metre breaststroke at the Games of the XXXIII Olympiad
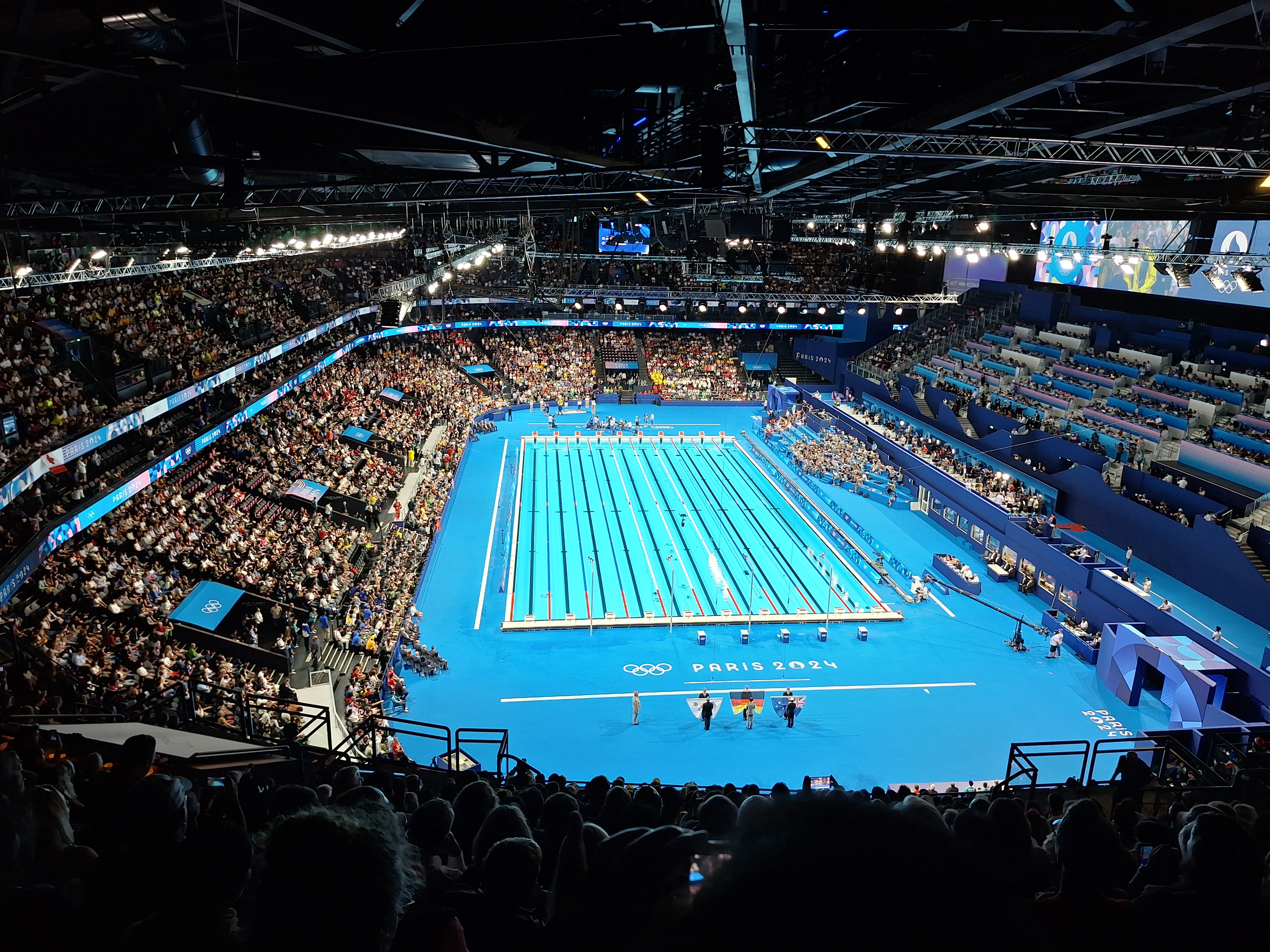
- Paris La Défense Arena after it was converted to a swimming pool for the swimming events
- Venue: Paris La Défense Arena
- Dates: 30 July 2024 (Heats and Semis); 31 July 2024 (Final)
- Competitors: 25 from 20 nations
- Winning time: 2:05.85 OR

Medalists
1st place, gold medalist(s)		Léon Marchand	France
2nd place, silver medalist(s)		Zac Stubblety-Cook	Australia
3rd place, bronze medalist(s)		Caspar Corbeau	Netherlands

The men's 200 metre breaststroke event at the 2024 Summer Olympics was held from 30 to 31 July 2024 at Paris La Défense Arena, which was converted to a swimming pool for the swimming events.

Australian Zac Stubblety-Cook, China's Qin Haiyang and France's Léon Marchand were considered the most likely candidates to win the event, though China's Dong Zhihao, the US' Matt Fallon, and Japan’s Ippei Watanabe and Yu Hanaguruma were also in contention for medals. All except Qin and Fallon progressed through to the final.

In the final, Marchand led from beginning to end, finishing with a new Olympic and European record of 2:05.85. Stubblety-Cook finished second with 2:06.79, and the Netherlands' Caspar Corbeau finished third with 2:07.90.

Marchand's victory won him his third gold of the Games and second gold of the night, as he had won the men's 200 metres butterfly earlier in the evening. He was the first swimmer to win two Olympic events on the same night since 1976. Marchand also became the first swimmer to win both breaststroke and butterfly events at the same Games. Michael Phelps, the most decorated Olympian of all time, believed that it was the best double in their sport that had ever occurred.

== Background ==
Australian Zac Stubblety-Cook won the event at the previous Olympics. He also won the event at the 2022 World Championships, won silver at the 2023 World Championships, and owned the second fastest qualifying time of 2:06.40. China's Qin Haiyang won the event at the 2023 World Championships, where he swam the world record of 2:05.48. That time had not been beaten since and was the fastest qualifying time.

France's Léon Marchand had the fourth fastest qualifying time of 2:06.59, and Braden Keith from SwimSwam wrote that "under ideal circumstances, Marchand is the best 200 breaststroker in the world." However, Marchand was also racing in the 200 metre butterfly finals around an hour and a half beforehand, which Keith opined may slow him down. The Olympic swimming schedule for this evening had been changed earlier in the year to give Marchand a better chance to perform well in both these events. (Note: Marchand's coach Bob Bowman, and Julien Issoulié, the French technical director, lobbied for the events to be shifted apart in the schedule, so that it would be easier for Marchand to compete in both.)

Other contenders for medals included China's Dong Zhihao, the world junior record holder; the US' Matt Fallon, the 2023 World Championships bronze medallist; and Japan's duet of Ippei Watanabe and Yu Hanaguruma, the fifth and sixth fastest qualifiers, respectively. Both SwimSwam and Swimming World predicted Qin would win gold and Marchand win take silver. Swimming World predicted Fallon would come, while SwimSwam predicted it would be Stubblety-Cook.

The event was held at Paris La Défense Arena, which was converted to a swimming pool for the swimming events.

== Qualification ==
Each National Olympic Committee (NOC) was permitted to enter a maximum of two qualified athletes in each individual event, but only if both of them had attained the Olympic Qualifying Time (OQT). For this event, the OQT was 2:09.68. World Aquatics then considered athletes qualifying through universality; NOCs were given one event entry for each gender, which could be used by any athlete regardless of qualification time, providing the spaces had not already been taken by athletes from that nation who had achieved the OQT. Finally, the rest of the spaces were filled by athletes who had met the Olympic Consideration Time (OCT), which was 2:10.33 for this event. In total, 18 athletes qualified through achieving the OQT, 6 athletes qualified through universality places and one athlete qualified through achieving the OCT.

Top 10 fastest qualification times
Swimmer	Country	Time	Competition
Qin Haiyang	China	02:05:48	2023 World Aquatics Championships
Zac Stubblety-Cook	Australia	02:06:40	2023 World Aquatics Championships
Matthew Fallon	United States	02:06:54	2024 United States Olympic Trials
Léon Marchand	France	02:06:59	2024 French Elite Championships
Ippei Watanabe	Japan	02:06:94	2024 Japanese Olympic Trials
Yu Hanaguruma	Japan	02:07:07	2024 Japanese Olympic Trials
Dong Zhihao	China	02:07:94	2024 World Aquatics Championships
Caspar Corbeau	Netherlands	02:07:99	2023 Rotterdam Qualification Meet
Joshua Yong	Australia	02:08:08	2024 Australian Olympic Trials
Arno Kamminga	Netherlands	02:08:30	2023 Rotterdam Qualification Meet

== Heats ==
Four heats (preliminary rounds) took place on 30 July 2024, starting at 13:01. (Note: All times are Central European Summer Time (UTC+2)) The swimmers with the best 16 times in the heats advanced to the semifinals. South Korea's Cho Sung-jae swam the fastest qualifying time of 2:09.45, while Stubblety-Cook qualified second and Marchand qualified third. Dong, Watanabe, Hanaguruma, Fallon and Qin were among those that qualified, though SwimSwam wrote that Qin "nearly didn't make it back" as he qualified with the fifteenth fastest time of sixteen qualifiers. The Netherlands' Arno Kamminga, who qualified in twelfth, withdrew from the semi-finals due to injury, which meant Mexico's Miguel de Lara, who originally finished in seventeenth, was able to compete in the semifinals instead.

Results
Rank	Heat	Lane	Swimmer	Nation	Time	Notes
1	4	7	Cho Sung-jae	South Korea	2:09.45	Q
2	3	4	Zac Stubblety-Cook	Australia	2:09.49	Q
3	4	5	Léon Marchand	France	2:09.55	Q
4	3	3	Caspar Corbeau	Netherlands	2:09.78	Q
5	3	5	Ippei Watanabe	Japan	2:09.86	Q
6	4	3	Dong Zhihao	China	2:09.91	Q
7	2	5	Yu Hanaguruma	Japan	2:10.35	Q
7	3	2	Erik Persson	Sweden	2:10.35	Q
9	4	2	Anton McKee	Iceland	2:10.36	Q
10	3	6	Josh Matheny	United States	2:10.39	Q
11	2	4	Matthew Fallon	United States	2:10.49	Q
12	4	6	Arno Kamminga	Netherlands	2:10.53	Q, WD
13	2	2	Lyubomir Epitropov	Bulgaria	2:10.59	Q
14	2	3	Joshua Yong	Australia	2:10.68	Q
15	4	4	Qin Haiyang	China	2:10.98	Q
16	3	1	Denis Petrashov	Kyrgyzstan	2:10.99	Q
17	3	7	Miguel de Lara	Mexico	2:11.16	q
18	2	6	Matti Mattsson	Finland	2:11.18	
19	2	7	Aleksas Savickas	Lithuania	2:11.53	
20	4	1	Jan Kałusowski	Poland	2:11.87	
21	4	8	Daniils Bobrovs	Latvia	2:13.66	
22	1	5	Tyler Christianson	Panama	2:15.62	
23	2	1	Amro Al-Wir	Jordan	2:15.78	
24	1	4	Julio Horrego	Honduras	2:18.91	
25	1	3	Saud Ghali	Bahrain	2:22.51	

== Semifinals ==
Two semifinals took place on 30 July, starting at 21:59. The swimmers with the best eight times in the semifinals advanced to the final. Stubblety-Cook won the first heat with the second fastest qualifying time of 2:08.57, while Marchand won the first heat with the fastest qualifying time of 2:08.11. Dong qualified third, followed by the Netherlands' Caspar Corbeau, Watanabe, the US' Josh Matheny, Hanaguruma and then Australia's Joshua Yong. Qin and Fallon finished with the joint tenth fastest time, so both failed to qualify for the final.

Results
Rank	Heat	Lane	Swimmer	Nation	Time	Notes
1	2	5	Léon Marchand	France	2:08.11	Q
2	1	4	Zac Stubblety-Cook	Australia	2:08.57	Q
3	1	3	Dong Zhihao	China	2:08.99	Q
4	1	5	Caspar Corbeau	Netherlands	2:09.52	Q
5	2	3	Ippei Watanabe	Japan	2:09.62	Q
6	1	2	Josh Matheny	United States	2:09.70	Q
7	2	6	Yu Hanaguruma	Japan	2:09.72	Q
8	1	1	Joshua Yong	Australia	2:09.89	Q
9	2	1	Lyubomir Epitropov	Bulgaria	2:09.93	
10	2	7	Matthew Fallon	United States	2:09.96	
10	2	8	Qin Haiyang	China	2:09.96	
12	2	4	Cho Sung-jae	South Korea	2:10.03	
13	1	6	Erik Persson	Sweden	2:10.11	
14	1	8	Denis Petrashov	Kyrgyzstan	2:10.19	
15	2	2	Anton McKee	Iceland	2:10.42	
16	1	7	Miguel de Lara	Mexico	2:11.28	

== Final ==
The final took place at 21:59 on 31 July. Marchand led from beginning to end, finishing with a new Olympic and European record of 2:05.85. Stubblety-Cook was 0.93 seconds behind Marchand at the 15 metre mark, and SwimSwam later opined that Marchand's "opening 15 metres won him 200 breast gold over Stubblety-Cook". Over the remainder of the race, Stubblety-Cook swam himself into second position, and he won the silver medal with a time of 2:06.79. Corbeau won bronze with 2:07.90, ahead of Dong Zhihao who finished fourth with 2:08.46. In a post-race analysis, SwimSwam noted that Marchand and Stubblety-Cook swam almost the same speed on average during the breaststroke portions of the race, and that Marchand's lead was instead built up during the turns and underwater sections.

Marchand's win won him his third gold of the 2024 Games and second gold of the night, as he had won the men's 200 metres butterfly earlier in the evening. He was the first swimmer to win two Olympic events on the same night since 1976, when Kornelia Ender won the 100 metres butterfly and 200 metres freestyle for East Germany. He also achieved Olympic records in both races. After the race, Michael Phelps, the most decorated Olympian of all time, called it the "greatest double in our sport ever". Marchand also became the first swimmer to win both breaststroke and butterfly events at the same Games. Additionally, Corbeau's bronze was the first swimming medal for the Netherlands at the games.

Results
Rank	Lane	Swimmer	Nation	Time	Notes
1st place, gold medalist(s)	4	Léon Marchand	France	2:05.85	OR, ER
2nd place, silver medalist(s)	5	Zac Stubblety-Cook	Australia	2:06.79	
3rd place, bronze medalist(s)	6	Caspar Corbeau	Netherlands	2:07.90	
4	3	Dong Zhihao	China	2:08.46	
5	1	Yu Hanaguruma	Japan	2:08.79	
6	2	Ippei Watanabe	Japan	2:08.83	
7	7	Josh Matheny	United States	2:09.52	
8	8	Joshua Yong	Australia	2:11.44	

Statistics
Name	50 metre split	100 metre split	150 metre split	Time	Stroke rate (strokes/min)
Léon Marchand	28.42	1:00.59	1:33.12	2:05.85	39.2
Zac Stubblety-Cook	29.30	1:01.56	1:34.30	2:06.79	41.1
Caspar Corbeau	29.19	1:01.40	1:34.77	2:07.90	34.3
Dong Zhihao	29.05	1:02.24	1:36.16	2:08.46	44.8
Ippei Watanabe	29.44	1:02.44	1:35.37	2:08.83	33.9
Josh Matheny	29.17	1:02.01	1:35.73	2:09.52	48.6
Joshua Yong	29.72	1:02.66	1:36.92	2:11.44	36.0
