= Zac Stubblety-Cook =

Australian swimmer (born 1999)

Zac Stubblety-Cook OAM
Personal information
- Full name: Izaac Keith Stubblety-Cook
- Nationality: Australian
- Born: 4 January 1999 (age 27) Brisbane, Queensland, Australia
- Height: 1.81 m (5 ft 11 in)
- Weight: 72 kg (159 lb)

Sport
- Sport: Swimming
- Strokes: Breaststroke
Medal record
Men's swimming
Representing Australia
Olympic Games
Gold medal – first place	2020 Tokyo	200 m breaststroke
Silver medal – second place	2024 Paris	200 m breaststroke
Bronze medal – third place	2020 Tokyo	4×100 m mixed medley
Bronze medal – third place	2024 Paris	4×100 m mixed medley
World Championships (LC)
Gold medal – first place	2022 Budapest	200 m breaststroke
Silver medal – second place	2022 Budapest	4×100 m mixed medley
Silver medal – second place	2023 Fukuoka	200 m breaststroke
Silver medal – second place	2023 Fukuoka	4×100 m mixed medley
Bronze medal – third place	2023 Fukuoka	4×100 m medley
Commonwealth Games
Gold medal – first place	2022 Birmingham	200 m breaststroke
Gold medal – first place	2022 Birmingham	4×100 m mixed medley
Gold medal – first place	2026 Glasgow	4×100 m medley
Silver medal – second place	2022 Birmingham	100 m breaststroke
Silver medal – second place	2022 Birmingham	4×100 m medley
Bronze medal – third place	2026 Glasgow	200 m breaststroke
Pan Pacific Championships
Gold medal – first place	2026 Irvine	200 m breaststroke
Silver medal – second place	2018 Tokyo	200 m breaststroke
World Junior Championships
Bronze medal – third place	2017 Indianapolis	200 m breaststroke
Bronze medal – third place	2017 Indianapolis	4×100 m medley

Izaac Keith Stubblety-Cook OAM (/ˈstʌblɛti-/ STUB-let-ee-; born 4 January 1999) is an Australian swimmer.

He has won four Olympic medals, including gold in the 200 m breaststroke at the 2020 Olympics. He was also the 2022 world champion and a former world record holder in the event.

== Early life ==
Stubblety-Cook started swimming at Wellers Hill Water Ratz, a swimming club in Tarragindi, Queensland. His reason for joining was to participate in the swim program for general water safety.

== Career ==
Stubblety-Cook competed at the 2017 World Junior Championships in Indianapolis. Individually, he won the bronze medal in the 200 m breaststroke. He initially came 4th in the 4 × 100 m medley relay, but was promoted to the bronze medal position in 2018 after the gold medalists were disqualified for a doping violation.

Stubblety-Cook won a silver medal at the 2018 Pan Pacific Championships in the 200 m breaststroke with a personal best of 2:07.89.

At the 2019 World Championships in Gwangju, he came fourth in the 200 m breaststroke in a time of 2:07.36.

Stubblety-Cook qualified for the Tokyo Olympic team at the 2021 Australian Trials, recording 2:06.28 in the 200 m breaststroke. This broke Matthew Wilson's Australian record of 2:06.67 from 2019.

At the Tokyo Olympics, Stubblety-Cook won the gold medal in the 200 m breaststroke, setting an Olympic record of 2:06.38. He then competed in the mixed 4 × 100 m medley relay, which was the event's inaugural appearance at the Olympics. Australia won the bronze medal. He concluded the Olympics with the men's 4 × 100 m medley relay, where Australia finished 5th.

At the 2022 Australian Championships in Adelaide, Stubblety-Cook broke the world record in the 200 m breaststroke, recording 2:05.95. This surpassed Anton Chupkov's mark of 2:06.12 from 2019.

At the 2022 World Championships in Budapest, Stubblety-Cook came seventh in the 100 m breaststroke. Swimming the breaststroke leg of the mixed 4 × 100 m medley relay, he won the silver medal. Stubblety-Cook later won the gold medal in the 200 m breaststroke in a time of 2:07.07.

At the 2022 Commonwealth Games, Stubblety-Cook won the gold medal in the 200 m breaststroke and mixed 4 × 100 m medley relay events, establishing a games record in the latter. He won silver medals in the 100 m breaststroke and men's 4 × 100 m medley relay.

Stubblety-Cook qualified for the 2023 World Championships. His first medal of the championships came in the mixed 4 × 100 m medley relay, where Australia finished second. He then competed in the 200 m breaststroke. He won the silver medal in the event, and his world record was broken by gold medalist Qin Haiyang. In his final swim of the competition, he won the bronze medal in the 4 × 100 m medley relay.

At the 2024 Olympics, Stubblety-Cook won silver in the 200 m breaststroke. He swam in the heats of the mixed 4 × 100 m medley relay. He was replaced by Joshua Yong in the final, and Australia went on to win the bronze medal.

In October 2024, Stubblety-Cook moved to Melanie Marshall's program on the Gold Coast. This was prompted by the retirement of Stubblety-Cook's longtime coach, Vince Raleigh.

Stubblety-Cook qualified for the 2025 World Championships, but later withdrew due to a back injury.

== World records ==
=== Long course metres ===
No.	Event	Time	Meet	Location	Date	Status	Ref
1	200 m breaststroke	2:05.95	2022 Australian Swimming Championships	Adelaide, Australia	19 May 2022	Former	

Legend: OC – Oceanian record; NR – Australian record; e – equalled existing record;
Records not set in finals: h – heat; sf – semifinal; r – relay 1st leg; rh – relay heat 1st leg; b – B final; † – en route to final mark; so – swim-off; tt – time trial

== Olympic records ==
=== Long course metres ===
No.	Event	Time	Meet	Location	Date	Status	Notes	Ref
1	200 m breaststroke	2:06.38	2020 Summer Olympics	Tokyo, Japan	29 July 2021	Former		

Records
Preceded by (Russia) Anton Chupkov	Men's 200-metre breaststroke world record holder (long course); 19 May 2022 – 28 July 2023	Succeeded by (China) Qin Haiyang
