= Iceland at the 2023 World Aquatics Championships =

- Flag of Iceland
- World Aquatics code: ISL
- National federation: Sundsamband Íslands
- Website: www.sundsamband.is

in Fukuoka, Japan
- Competitors: 2 in 1 sport
- Medals: Gold 0 Silver 0 Bronze 0 Total 0

World Aquatics Championships appearances
- 1973; 1975; 1978; 1982; 1986; 1991; 1994; 1998; 2001; 2003; 2005; 2007; 2009; 2011; 2013; 2015; 2017; 2019; 2022; 2023; 2024; 2025

Iceland competed at the 2023 World Aquatics Championships in Fukuoka, Japan from 14 to 30 July.

== Swimming ==
Icelandic swimmers have achieved qualifying standards in the following events.

Athlete	Event	Heat		Semifinal		Final	
Athlete	Event	Time	Rank	Time	Rank	Time	Rank
Anton Sveinn McKee	Men's 100 m breaststroke	1:00.86	21	Did not advance			
Anton Sveinn McKee	Men's 200 m breaststroke	2:10.29	9 Q	2:09.19	7 Q	2:09.50	7
Snæfríður Jórunnardóttir	Women's 100 m freestyle	54.74 NR	17	Did not advance			
Snæfríður Jórunnardóttir	Women's 200 m freestyle	1:58.14 NR	14 Q	1:57.98 NR	14	Did not advance	
