= Iceland at the 2019 World Aquatics Championships =

- Flag of Iceland
- World Aquatics code: ISL
- National federation: Sundsamband Íslands
- Website: www.sundsamband.is

in Gwangju, South Korea
- Medals: Gold 0 Silver 0 Bronze 0 Total 0

World Aquatics Championships appearances
- 1973; 1975; 1978; 1982; 1986; 1991; 1994; 1998; 2001; 2003; 2005; 2007; 2009; 2011; 2013; 2015; 2017; 2019; 2022; 2023; 2024; 2025

Iceland competed at the 2019 World Aquatics Championships in Gwangju, South Korea from 12 to 28 July.

== Swimming ==
Iceland entered four swimmers.

Men

Athlete	Event	Heat		Semifinal		Final	
Athlete	Event	Time	Rank	Time	Rank	Time	Rank
Anton Sveinn McKee	50 m breaststroke	27.46	20	did not advance			
Anton Sveinn McKee	100 m breaststroke	1:00.32	24	did not advance			
Anton Sveinn McKee	200 m breaststroke	2:10.32	16 Q	2:10.68	16	did not advance	
Kristinn Þórarinsson	50 m backstroke	26.42	44	did not advance			
Kristinn Þórarinsson	100 m backstroke	56.99	46	did not advance			

Women

Athlete	Event	Heat		Semifinal		Final	
Athlete	Event	Time	Rank	Time	Rank	Time	Rank
Eygló Ósk Gústafsdóttir	50 m backstroke	29.82	29	did not advance			
Eygló Ósk Gústafsdóttir	100 m backstroke	1:03.46	42	did not advance			
Snæfríður Jórunnardóttir	100 m freestyle	57.34	43	did not advance			
Snæfríður Jórunnardóttir	200 m freestyle	2:07.43	41	did not advance			

Mixed

Athlete	Event	Heat		Final	
Athlete	Event	Time	Rank	Time	Rank
	4 × 100 m medley relay	DNS		did not advance	
