= Dive start =

A dive start is the action begun at the start of a swimming race. In most strokes, the swimmer jumps off the diving blocks after hearing the starting signal. However, if it is a backstroke event, the swimmers will be starting in the water. All dives are followed by a streamline just like turning.
