= Iceland at the 2013 World Aquatics Championships =

- Flag of Iceland
- FINA code: ISL
- National federation: Sundsamband Íslands
- Website: www.sundsamband.is

in Barcelona, Spain
- Competitors: 4 in 1 sports
- Medals Ranked -th: Gold 0 Silver 0 Bronze 0 Total 0

World Aquatics Championships appearances
- 1973; 1975; 1978; 1982; 1986; 1991; 1994; 1998; 2001; 2003; 2005; 2007; 2009; 2011; 2013; 2015; 2017; 2019; 2022; 2023; 2024

Iceland competed at the 2013 World Aquatics Championships in Barcelona, Spain from 19 July to 4 August 2013.

== Swimming ==
Icelandic swimmers achieved qualifying standards in the following events (up to a maximum of 2 swimmers in each event at the A-standard entry time, and 1 at the B-standard):

Men

Athlete	Event	Heat		Semifinal		Final	
Athlete	Event	Time	Rank	Time	Rank	Time	Rank
Anton Sveinn McKee	400 m freestyle	3:54.67	27	did not advance			
Anton Sveinn McKee	800 m freestyle	8:08.71	25	—		did not advance	
Anton Sveinn McKee	200 m breaststroke	2:15.12	29	did not advance			
Anton Sveinn McKee	400 m individual medley	4:23.99	26	—		did not advance	

Women

Athlete	Event	Heat		Semifinal		Final	
Athlete	Event	Time	Rank	Time	Rank	Time	Rank
Eygló Ósk Gústafsdóttir	200 m freestyle	2:04.66	34	did not advance			
Eygló Ósk Gústafsdóttir	100 m backstroke	1:01.71	20	did not advance			
Eygló Ósk Gústafsdóttir	200 m backstroke	2:12.32	17	did not advance			
Eygló Ósk Gústafsdóttir	200 m individual medley	2:18.18	33	did not advance			
Ingibjörg Jónsdóttir	50 m freestyle	25.88	32	did not advance			
Ingibjörg Jónsdóttir	50 m backstroke	28.62	=17*	did not advance			
Hrafnhildur Lúthersdóttir	50 m breaststroke	31.50	16 Q	31.37	13	did not advance	
Hrafnhildur Lúthersdóttir	100 m breaststroke	1:09.75	30	did not advance			
Hrafnhildur Lúthersdóttir	200 m breaststroke	2:28.12	16 Q	2:29.30	15	did not advance	
