= Joshua Yong =

Australian swimmer (born 2001)

Personal information
- Nickname: Josh
- Nationality: Australian
- Born: 24 July 2001 (age 24) Bandar Seri Begawan, Brunei

Sport
- Sport: Swimming
- Club: UWA West Coast Club
- Coach: Ben Higson
Medal record
Men's swimming
Representing Australia
Olympic Games
Bronze medal – third place	2024 Paris	4×100 m mixed medley
World Championships (SC)
Gold medal – first place	2022 Melbourne	4×100 m medley

Joshua Yong (born 24 July 2001, Chinese name 楊𣷠捷, pinyin Yang Mingjie) is a Bruneian-born Australian swimmer. He competed in the mixed 4 × 100 metre medley relay at the 2024 Summer Olympics, where he won a bronze medal.

== Early life and education ==
Yong was born in Bandar Seri Begawan, the capital city of Brunei, on 24 July 2001. Until the age of 11, he studied for most of his junior year in this small nation on the island of Borneo. He didn't get a chance to work harder on some sets until the school holidays arrived. On 2 October 2011, he competed in the Boys 10 & Under 100 LC Meter, Boys 10 & Under 100 LC Meter Backstroke, and Boys 10 & Under 100 LC Meter Freestyle events in the Brunei 100-meter sprint swimming championship on behalf of his school, Jerudong International School.

He spent time in Melbourne throughout the summer, and later relocated to Perth in order to pursue his swimming career. While in Melbourne, he alongside his younger brother, Jayden, trained with the Casey TigerSharks throughout the summer break, together with his family. "I started learning to swim when I was about three years old, and I just loved it," he said.

He migrated to the Sunshine Coast in 2021 and joined the USC Spartans swimming club, following his coach, before coming back to Perth in 2022. He started swimming competitively at the age of eight, having learned to swim at the age of three. His career took off once he relocated to Perth to train at West Coast Swimming Club under Mick Palfrey. At the University of Western Australia (UWA) in Perth, he studies engineering. With the support of the Student Athlete Development Program, he is pursuing postgraduate studies after earning a Bachelor of Science from UWA. Joshua describes his work as "helping athletes balance sport and study."

== Swimming career ==
At the 2019 World Junior Championships in Budapest, Yong participated in the men's and mixed medley relays as well as all three breaststroke events, marking his first international competition as an Australian. After that, he competed in his first Commonwealth Games in Birmingham, where he advanced to the 50- and 100-meter breaststroke semifinals. After cutting 0.16 off his previous personal best time of 59.99 at the competition, he began in 28.51 and ended in 31.32, tying Daniel Cave for the seventh-highest Australian performance in history.

Yong teamed up with Matthew Temple, Isaac Cooper, Kyle Chalmers, and others at the 2022 short course world championships to win gold in the 4x100-meter medley relay and establish a world record of 3:18.98. In 2023, he won silver medals in the 50- and 100-meter breaststroke events in Australia. He won bronze in the 200-meter breaststroke in the Gold Coast Australian Age and MC Age Championships in 2024, trailing only visiting Japanese star Ippei Watanabe and Zac Stubblety-Cook with a time of 2:07.62, a full three seconds faster than his previous best.

Then Yong broke the traditional Approach during the 2024 Swimming Australia Olympic Trials in Brisbane, first by swimming the 200-meter breaststroke in 2:07.40 to 2:08.08 seconds behind reigning Olympic champion Zac Stubblety-Cook, and then coming in second to Sam Williamson in the 100-meter breaststroke. With a personal best time of 59.48, he made the Olympic qualifying standard by a mere 0.01 seconds.

At the 2024 Summer Olympics in Paris, Yong competed in several events. In the men's 100-metre breaststroke, he finished in 12th place. He ranked 8th in the men's 200-metre breaststroke. He swam in both the prelims and finals for the men's 4 x 100-metre medley relay, which unfortunately did not medal. However, his team secured 3rd place in the mixed 4 x 100-metre medley relay, earning him a bronze and his first Olympic medal of his career.
