= Iceland at the 2011 World Aquatics Championships =

- Flag of Iceland
- FINA code: ISL
- National federation: Sundsamband Íslands
- Website: www.sundsamband.is

in Shanghai, China
- Competitors: 7 in 1 sports
- Medals Ranked -th: Gold 0 Silver 0 Bronze 0 Total 0

World Aquatics Championships appearances
- 1973; 1975; 1978; 1982; 1986; 1991; 1994; 1998; 2001; 2003; 2005; 2007; 2009; 2011; 2013; 2015; 2017; 2019; 2022; 2023; 2024

Iceland competed at the 2011 World Aquatics Championships in Shanghai, China between July 16 and 31, 2011.

== Swimming ==
Iceland qualified 7 swimmers.

Men

Athlete	Event	Heats		Semifinals		Final	
Athlete	Event	Time	Rank	Time	Rank	Time	Rank
Anton Sveinn McKee	Men's 800m Freestyle	8:17.83	39			did not advance	
Jakob Sveinsson	Men's 100m Breaststroke	1:01.51	27	did not advance			
Jakob Sveinsson	Men's 200m Breaststroke	2:13.84	25	did not advance			

Women

Athlete	Event	Heats		Semifinals		Final	
Athlete	Event	Time	Rank	Time	Rank	Time	Rank
Ragnheiður Ragnarsdóttir	Women's 50m Freestyle	25.57	21	did not advance			
Ragnheiður Ragnarsdóttir	Women's 100m Freestyle	56.28	34	did not advance			
Ingibjörg Kristín Jónsdóttir	Women's 50m Backstroke	29.66	35	did not advance			
Eygló Ósk Gústafsdóttir	Women's 200m Backstroke	2:15.16	30	did not advance			
Erla Dögg Haraldsdóttir	Women's 50m Breaststroke	32.10	17	did not advance			
Erla Dögg Haraldsdóttir	Women's 200m IM	2:21.86	49	did not advance			
Hrafnhildur Lúthersdóttir	Women's 100m Breaststroke	1:09.82	26	did not advance			
Hrafnhildur Lúthersdóttir	Women's 200m IM	2:18.20	26	did not advance			
