= Open turn =

Open turn may refer to:

- Open turn (swimming) turn technique in swimming
- Open turn (dance) dance move
