= Swimming at the 2023 World Aquatics Championships – Men's 200 metre breaststroke =

Men's 200 metre breaststroke at the 2023 World Aquatics Championships
- Venue: Marine Messe Fukuoka
- Location: Fukuoka, Japan
- Dates: 27 July (heats and semifinals); 28 July (final)
- Competitors: 44 from 40 nations
- Winning time: 2:05.48 WR

Medalists
gold medal	Qin Haiyang	China
silver medal	Zac Stubblety-Cook	Australia
bronze medal	Matt Fallon	United States

The men's 200 metre breaststroke competition at the 2023 World Aquatics Championships was held on 27 and 28 July 2023.

== Records ==
Prior to the competition, the existing world and championship records were as follows.

World record	Zac Stubblety-Cook (AUS)	2:05.95	Adelaide, Australia	19 May 2022
Competition record	Anton Chupkov (RUS)	2:06.12	Gwangju, South Korea	26 July 2019

The following new records were set during this competition.

Date	Event	Name	Nationality	Time	Record
28 July	Final	Qin Haiyang	China	2:05.48	WR

== Results ==
=== Heats ===
The heats were started on 27 July at 11:28.

Rank	Heat	Lane	Name	Nationality	Time	Notes
1	5	4	Zac Stubblety-Cook	Australia	2:08.98	Q
2	3	6	Caspar Corbeau	Netherlands	2:09.29	Q
3	5	5	Matthew Fallon	United States	2:09.32	Q
4	3	2	Aleksas Savickas	Lithuania	2:09.66	Q
5	3	4	Qin Haiyang	China	2:09.86	Q
6	4	3	Josh Matheny	United States	2:09.90	Q
7	4	6	Dong Zhihao	China	2:10.06	Q
8	4	5	Ippei Watanabe	Japan	2:10.11	Q
9	5	6	Anton McKee	Iceland	2:10.29	Q
10	5	3	Arno Kamminga	Netherlands	2:10.47	Q
11	3	3	Erik Persson	Sweden	2:10.51	Q
11	5	7	Antoine Marc	France	2:10.51	Q
13	4	8	Lyubomir Epitropov	Bulgaria	2:10.76	Q
14	5	2	Matti Mattsson	Finland	2:11.00	Q
15	3	5	Shoma Sato	Japan	2:11.03	Q
16	4	9	Maksym Ovchinnikov	Ukraine	2:11.71	Q
17	4	7	Dawid Wiekiera	Poland	2:11.92	
18	2	5	Darragh Greene	Ireland	2:12.21	
19	3	1	Christopher Rothbauer	Austria	2:12.29	
20	3	0	Adam John Chillingworth	Hong Kong	2:12.30	
21	2	2	Ron Polonsky	Israel	2:12.34	
22	4	2	Miguel de Lara	Mexico	2:12.40	
23	5	1	Greg Butler	Great Britain	2:12.52	
24	5	8	Noah De Schryver	Belgium	2:12.63	
25	5	9	Berkay Ömer Öğretir	Turkey	2:12.65	
26	3	7	Cho Sung-jae	South Korea	2:12.77	
27	5	0	Amro Al-Wir	Jordan	2:12.90	
28	4	1	Carles Coll	Spain	2:13.09	
29	2	3	Joshua Gilbert	New Zealand	2:13.59	
30	4	0	Brayden Taivassalo	Canada	2:13.81	
31	3	9	Maximillian Wei Ang	Singapore	2:14.63	
32	2	6	Daniils Bobrovs	Latvia	2:15.95	
33	2	7	Tyler Christianson	Panama	2:17.43	
34	2	4	Phạm Thanh Bảo	Vietnam	2:17.89	
35	2	9	Liam Davis	Zimbabwe	2:18.45	
36	2	1	Constantin Malachi	Moldova	2:18.87	
37	2	8	Julio Horrego	Honduras	2:20.70	
38	2	0	Adriel Sanes	U.S. Virgin Islands	2:22.20	
39	1	3	Luis Sebastian Weekes	Barbados	2:22.94	
40	1	5	Jonathan Chung Yee	Mauritius	2:23.21	
41	1	4	Abdulaziz Al-Obaidly	Qatar	2:24.01	
42	1	6	Andrej Stojanovski	North Macedonia	2:25.40	
43	1	2	Bransly Dirksz	Aruba	2:28.73	
	4	4	Léon Marchand	France	Did not start	
	3	8	Denis Petrashov	Kyrgyzstan	Disqualified	

=== Semifinals ===
The semifinals were held on 27 July at 20:43.

Rank	Heat	Lane	Name	Nationality	Time	Notes
1	2	4	Zac Stubblety-Cook	Australia	2:07.27	Q
2	2	3	Qin Haiyang	China	2:07.70	Q
3	2	5	Matthew Fallon	United States	2:07.90	Q
4	2	6	Dong Zhihao	China	2:08.47	Q, WJ
5	1	4	Caspar Corbeau	Netherlands	2:08.49	Q
6	1	3	Josh Matheny	United States	2:09.04	Q
7	2	2	Anton McKee	Iceland	2:09.19	Q
8	1	6	Ippei Watanabe	Japan	2:09.50	Q
9	2	7	Erik Persson	Sweden	2:09.89	
10	1	1	Matti Mattsson	Finland	2:09.93	
11	1	5	Aleksas Savickas	Lithuania	2:10.16	
12	1	2	Arno Kamminga	Netherlands	2:10.57	
13	1	7	Antoine Marc	France	2:10.66	
14	2	8	Shoma Sato	Japan	2:10.72	
15	2	1	Lyubomir Epitropov	Bulgaria	2:11.28	
16	1	8	Maksym Ovchinnikov	Ukraine	2:11.95	

=== Final ===
The final was held on 28 July at 21:24.

Rank	Lane	Name	Nationality	Time	Notes
1st place, gold medalist(s)	5	Qin Haiyang	China	2:05.48	WR
2nd place, silver medalist(s)	4	Zac Stubblety-Cook	Australia	2:06.40	
3rd place, bronze medalist(s)	3	Matthew Fallon	United States	2:07.74	
4	6	Dong Zhihao	China	2:08.04	WJ
5	2	Caspar Corbeau	Netherlands	2:08.42	
6	8	Ippei Watanabe	Japan	2:08.78	
7	1	Anton McKee	Iceland	2:09.50	
8	7	Josh Matheny	United States	2:10.41	
