= Iceland at the 2015 World Aquatics Championships =

- Flag of Iceland
- FINA code: ISL
- National federation: Sundsamband Íslands
- Website: www.sundsamband.is

in Kazan, Russia
- Competitors: 5 in 1 sport
- Medals: Gold 0 Silver 0 Bronze 0 Total 0

World Aquatics Championships appearances
- 1973; 1975; 1978; 1982; 1986; 1991; 1994; 1998; 2001; 2003; 2005; 2007; 2009; 2011; 2013; 2015; 2017; 2019; 2022; 2023; 2024

Iceland competed at the 2015 World Aquatics Championships in Kazan, Russia from 24 July to 9 August 2015.

== Swimming ==
Icelandic swimmers have achieved qualifying standards in the following events (up to a maximum of 2 swimmers in each event at the A-standard entry time, and 1 at the B-standard):

Men

Athlete	Event	Heat		Semifinal		Final	
Athlete	Event	Time	Rank	Time	Rank	Time	Rank
Anton Sveinn McKee	100 m breaststroke	1:00.53	19	did not advance			
Anton Sveinn McKee	200 m breaststroke	2:10.21 NR	10 Q	2:10.79	13	did not advance	

Women

Athlete	Event	Heat		Semifinal		Final	
Athlete	Event	Time	Rank	Time	Rank	Time	Rank
Eygló Ósk Gústafsdóttir	50 m backstroke	28.75	23	did not advance			
Eygló Ósk Gústafsdóttir	100 m backstroke	1:00.25 NR	9 Q	1:00.69	15	did not advance	
Eygló Ósk Gústafsdóttir	200 m backstroke	2:09.16	=4 Q	2:09.04	7 Q	2:09.53	8
Jóhanna Gústafsdóttir	100 m butterfly	1:02.43	43	did not advance			
Bryndís Rún Hansen	50 m freestyle	26.33	50	did not advance			
Bryndís Rún Hansen	100 m freestyle	56.87	45	did not advance			
Hrafnhildur Lúthersdóttir	50 m breaststroke	30.90	=12 Q	30.90	7 Q	31.12	7
Hrafnhildur Lúthersdóttir	100 m breaststroke	1:06.87 NR	6 Q	1:07.11	8 Q	1:07.10	6
Hrafnhildur Lúthersdóttir	200 m breaststroke	2:23.54	3 Q	2:23.06	=8	did not advance	
Hrafnhildur Lúthersdóttir	200 m individual medley	2:14.12	20	did not advance			
Eygló Ósk Gústafsdóttir; Jóhanna Gústafsdóttir; Bryndís Rún Hansen; Hrafnhildur Lúthersdóttir	4×100 m medley relay	4:04.43	=18	—		did not advance	
