= Iceland at the 2024 World Aquatics Championships =

- Flag of Iceland
- FINA code: ISL
- National federation: Sundsamband Íslands
- Website: www.sundsamband.is

in Doha, Qatar
- Competitors: 1 in 1 sport
- Medals: Gold 0 Silver 0 Bronze 0 Total 0

World Aquatics Championships appearances
- 1973; 1975; 1978; 1982; 1986; 1991; 1994; 1998; 2001; 2003; 2005; 2007; 2009; 2011; 2013; 2015; 2017; 2019; 2022; 2023; 2024

Iceland competed at the 2024 World Aquatics Championships in Doha, Qatar from 2 to 18 February.

== Swimming ==
One Icelandic swimmer has achieved qualifying standards in the following events.

Women

Athlete	Event	Heat		Semifinal		Final	
Athlete	Event	Time	Rank	Time	Rank	Time	Rank
Jóhanna Elín Guðmundsdóttir	50 m freestyle	26.20	42	Did not advance			
Jóhanna Elín Guðmundsdóttir	50 m butterfly	28.19	36	Did not advance			
