= Iceland at the 2022 World Aquatics Championships =

- Flag of Iceland
- FINA code: ISL
- National federation: Sundsamband Íslands
- Website: www.sundsamband.is

in Budapest, Hungary
- Competitors: 2 in 1 sport
- Medals: Gold 0 Silver 0 Bronze 0 Total 0

World Aquatics Championships appearances
- 1973; 1975; 1978; 1982; 1986; 1991; 1994; 1998; 2001; 2003; 2005; 2007; 2009; 2011; 2013; 2015; 2017; 2019; 2022; 2023; 2024

Iceland competed at the 2022 World Aquatics Championships in Budapest, Hungary from 18 June to 3 July.

== Swimming ==
Icelandic swimmers have achieved qualifying standards in the following events.

| Athlete | Event | Heat | | Semifinal | | Final | |
| Athlete | Event | Time | Rank | Time | Rank | Time | Rank |
|---|---|---|---|---|---|---|---|
| Anton Sveinn McKee | Men's 100 m breaststroke | 1:00.80 | =17 | did not advance | | | |
| Anton Sveinn McKee | Men's 200 m breaststroke | 2:09.69 | 5 Q | 2:08.74 | 2 Q | 2:09.37 | 6 |
| Snæfríður Jórunnardóttir | Women's 100 m freestyle | 56.31 | 26 | did not advance | | | |
| Snæfríður Jórunnardóttir | Women's 200 m freestyle | 2:00.61 | 20 | did not advance | | | |
