= Iceland at the 2017 World Aquatics Championships =

- Flag of Iceland
- FINA code: ISL
- National federation: Sundsamband Íslands
- Website: www.sundsamband.is

in Budapest, Hungary
- Competitors: 3 in 1 sport
- Medals: Gold 0 Silver 0 Bronze 0 Total 0

World Aquatics Championships appearances
- 1973; 1975; 1978; 1982; 1986; 1991; 1994; 1998; 2001; 2003; 2005; 2007; 2009; 2011; 2013; 2015; 2017; 2019; 2022; 2023; 2024

Iceland competed at the 2017 World Aquatics Championships in Budapest, Hungary from 14 July to 30 July.

== Swimming ==
Icelandic swimmers have achieved qualifying standards in the following events (up to a maximum of 2 swimmers in each event at the A-standard entry time, and 1 at the B-standard):

Athlete	Event	Heat		Semifinal		Final	
Athlete	Event	Time	Rank	Time	Rank	Time	Rank
Bryndis Hansen	Women's 100 m freestyle	56.11	30	did not advance			
Bryndis Hansen	Women's 50 m butterfly	27.15	31	did not advance			
Bryndis Hansen	Women's 100 m butterfly	1:01.32	32	did not advance			
Ingibjörg Jónsdóttir	Women's 50 m freestyle	26.24	41	did not advance			
Ingibjörg Jónsdóttir	Women's 50 m backstroke	28.53	26	did not advance			
Hrafnhildur Lúthersdóttir	Women's 50 m breaststroke	30.88	11 Q	30.71	10	did not advance	
Hrafnhildur Lúthersdóttir	Women's 100 m breaststroke	1:07.54	18	did not advance			
