= Underwater swimming =

Underwater swimming can refer to:

- Unequipped swimming beneath the water surface, such as the streamline style
- Scuba diving, snorkeling, or free-diving
- Swimming at the 1900 Summer Olympics - Men's underwater swimming
