= Matthew Wilson (swimmer) =

Australian swimmer

Personal information
- Nationality: Australian
- Born: 8 December 1998 (age 27)
- Height: 1.86 m (6 ft 1 in)

Sport
- Sport: Swimming
- Strokes: Breaststroke
- Club: Sydney Olympic Park Aquatic Centre
Medal record
Representing Australia
World Championships (LC)
Gold medal – first place	2019 Gwangju	4×100 m mixed medley
Silver medal – second place	2017 Budapest	4×100 m mixed medley
Silver medal – second place	2019 Gwangju	200 m breaststroke
Silver medal – second place	2022 Budapest	4×100 m mixed medley
Commonwealth Games
Gold medal – first place	2018 Gold Coast	4×100 m medley
Bronze medal – third place	2018 Gold Coast	200 m breastroke
Pan Pacific Championships
Bronze medal – third place	2018 Tokyo	200 m breaststroke
World Junior Championships
Silver medal – second place	2015 Singapore	200 m breaststroke
Silver medal – second place	2015 Singapore	4×100 m mixed medley
Bronze medal – third place	2015 Singapore	4×100 m medley
Junior Pan Pacific Championships
Silver medal – second place	2016 Maui	100 m breaststroke
Silver medal – second place	2016 Maui	200 m breaststroke
Silver medal – second place	2016 Maui	4×100 m freestyle
Bronze medal – third place	2014 Maui	200 m breaststroke
Bronze medal – third place	2016 Maui	4×100 m medley

Matthew Wilson (born 8 December 1998) was an Australian swimmer. He competed in the men's 50 metre breaststroke and 200 metre breaststroke events at the 2017 World Aquatics Championships and at the 100 & 200 metre breastroke at the 2019 World Aquatic Championships, winning a silver medal in the 200 m breaststroke, as well as medley relay medals on both occasions. Wilson also competed in 100 & 200 metre breastroke at the 2020 Tokyo Olympics, and formerly held the world record in the 200 metre breaststroke. He retired on 4 June 2025.

Records
Preceded by (Japan) Ippei Watanabe	Men's 200-metre breaststroke world record holder (long course); 25 July 2019 – 26 July 2019 with Ippei Watanabe	Succeeded by (Russia) Anton Chupkov
