= 2018 Pan Pacific Swimming Championships – Men's 200 metre breaststroke =

Men's 200 metre breaststroke at the 2018 Pan Pacific Swimming Championships
- Venue: Tokyo Tatsumi International Swimming Center
- Dates: 12 August (heats & finals)
- Competitors: 14 from 6 nations
- Winning time: 2:07.75

Medalists
gold medal	Ippei Watanabe	Japan
silver medal	Zac Stubblety-Cook	Australia
bronze medal	Matthew Wilson	Australia

The men's 200 metre breaststroke competition at the 2018 Pan Pacific Swimming Championships took place on August 12 at the Tokyo Tatsumi International Swimming Center. The defending champion was Yasuhiro Koseki of Japan.

== Records ==
Prior to this competition, the existing world and Pan Pacific records were as follows:

World record	Ippei Watanabe (JPN)	2:06.67	Tokyo, Japan	29 January 2017
Pan Pacific Championships record	Kosuke Kitajima (JPN)	2:08.36	Irvine, United States	21 August 2010

== Results ==
All times are in minutes and seconds.

KEY:	QA	Qualified A Final	QB	Qualified B Final	CR	Championships record	NR	National record	PB	Personal best	SB	Seasonal best

=== Heats ===
The first round was held on 12 August from 10:00.

Only two swimmers from each country may advance to the A or B final. If a country not qualify any swimmer to the A final, that same country may qualify up to three swimmers to the B final.

Rank	Name	Nationality	Time	Notes
1	Josh Prenot	United States	2:08.02	QA, CR
2	Andrew Wilson	United States	2:08.66	~~QA~~, WD
3	Matthew Wilson	Australia	2:09.26	QA
4	Yasuhiro Koseki	Japan	2:09.27	QA
5	Zac Stubblety-Cook	Australia	2:11.52	QA
6	Ippei Watanabe	Japan	2:12.15	QA
7	Eli Wall	Canada	2:13.44	QA
8	Liu Yunsong	China	2:14.29	QA
9	Wang Lizhuo	China	2:14.68	QA
10	Hiromasa Fujimori	Japan	2:15.02	QB
11	Song Jiale	China	2:19.07	QB
12	Tristan Cote	Canada	2:22.13	QB
13	Timothy Yen	Philippines	2:38.06	QB
–	Chase Kalisz	United States	DNS	

=== B Final ===
The B final was held on 12 August from 17:30.

Rank	Name	Nationality	Time	Notes
9	Hiromasa Fujimori	Japan	2:14.04	
10	Song Jiale	China	2:16.77	
11	Tristan Cote	Canada	2:19.36	
12	Timothy Yen	Philippines	2:36.01	

=== A Final ===
The A final was held on 12 August from 17:30.

Rank	Name	Nationality	Time	Notes
1st place, gold medalist(s)	Ippei Watanabe	Japan	2:07.75	CR
2nd place, silver medalist(s)	Zac Stubblety-Cook	Australia	2:07.89	
3rd place, bronze medalist(s)	Matthew Wilson	Australia	2:08.22	
4	Yasuhiro Koseki	Japan	2:08.25	
5	Josh Prenot	United States	2:08.44	
6	Wang Lizhuo	China	2:11.49	
7	Liu Yunsong	China	2:12.27	
8	Eli Wall	Canada	2:13.56	
