= Streamline (swimming) =

Body form used by swimmers

Streamline form is a swimming technique that is used underwater in every stroke. At the start of a race or on a turn, streamline form is used, usually along with a dolphin kick or flutter kick, to create the least resistance to help the swimmer propel as far as they can. Many factors contribute to the perfect streamline form and mastering this method increases a swimmer's speed. Streamline is one of the key fundamentals to mastering any stroke.

== Technique ==
The streamline position consists of a person placing hand over hand, fingers over fingers and raising their arms above their head so the biceps are tucked close to the ears. The belly is sucked back to decrease curvature of the spine in the lower back and the swimmer's head is brought back to ensure that neck is in line with the spine Pinching the shoulder blades together is helpful in aligning the spine to straighten out the back. Legs are straight and feet are pointed. In theory, a perfect, straight line will be made down the backside of a swimmer from their head to their feet. The body should be on a horizontal plane under the water, with the legs kicking straight from the thighs and hips, not the knees. A great deal of flexibility is usually needed to reach the goal of a perfect streamline, particularly flexibility of the shoulders. Kicking in the streamline position underwater can be substantially faster than swimming any of the other aquatic strokes, competitive or otherwise. For this reason, competitive swimmers often try to kick in a streamline position off a wall or the starting block for as long as they can be underwater before coming up for their first stroke. This is why many swimmers spend a lot of time perfecting the form and technique of streamline.

== Hydrodynamics and Speed ==
There are three main resistances caused by drag on a swimmer which are caused from friction, form, and wave-making forces. The most detrimental force to streamline would be the resistance caused by form. Bad form will cause more drag on a body in water (resistance) resulting in more work needing to be done to cover the same amount of distance. The amount of resistance on an object can be determined by the formula,

$$R=1/2 DpAv^2$$

D is the constant for the viscosity of the fluid, p is the density of the water, A is the surface area of the body traveling through the water, and v is the velocity of the body.

Because the velocity is squared, the resistance will be exponentially affected by the value of velocity, which is why it is important to minimize the surface area as much as possible. Minimizing surface area is directly proportional to technique. Timing in the transition from the glide to the kick is crucial for a swimmer to keep up their momentum. Switching to the kick too early will cause an increase in resistance. A transition that is performed too late will result in loss of speed due to the decrease in momentum, resulting in a waste of energy while returning to race speed. With all aspects of streamline brought together, it makes it the most hydrodynamic position one can assume in the water.

== Competition and Rules ==
Streamline position is mostly used at the start of the race once a swimmer dives into the water off of the blocks. It is most common for the swimmer to dive into the water head first with their arms above their head and assume the streamline form at entry. The other common occurrence of streamline in a competitive race is after a swimmer completes a flip turn and pushes off of the wall. Once they have completely turned over to the opposing direction, the swimmer will then get into streamline position and push off of the wall to maximize the distance and speed out of the turn. Streamline position is the basis of the spinal axis strokes, backstroke and freestyle, as well. A swimmer will try to maintain a straight back and legs to minimize 'drag' during the stroke.

The Fédération Internationale de Natation (F.I.N.A.), otherwise known as the International Swimming Federation, has strict rules on how and when streamline may be performed in competition. According to FINA, no swimmer may travel more than 15 meters (16.4 yards) off of a start or turn in the backstroke, butterfly and freestyle underwater. Breaststroke is only allowed one complete arm stroke followed by a butterfly kick and breaststroke kick. After fifteen meters, the swimmer must break the surface of the water. This rule applies to all races done in compliance with FINA rules whether it is short course or long course. Swimmers in a race will usually maintain the streamline form and perform a butterfly kick for the full fifteen meter allowance due to the fact that there is less resistance than there is on top of the water due to the lack of drag created by waves. While is no specified limit for breaststroke, since the number of underwater strokes and kicks are regulated, this becomes a moot point to competitive swimming since the swimmer's speed will drop off rapidly without additional kicks making it more advantageous to surface before the fifteen meter line.
