= Swimming at the 2024 Summer Olympics – Mixed 4 × 100-metre medley relay =

Mixed 4 × 100 metre medley relay at the Games of the XXXIII Olympiad
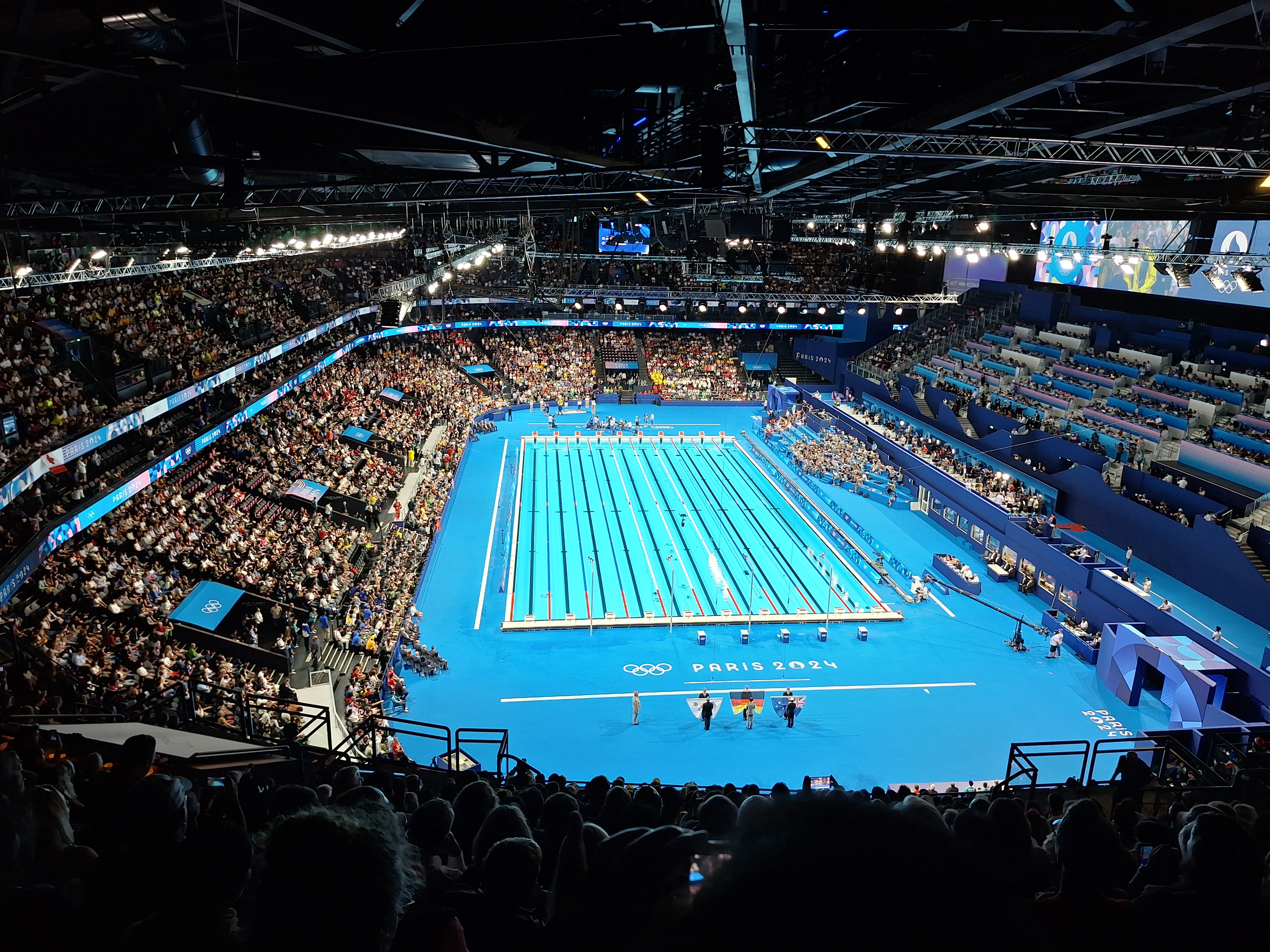
- Paris La Défense Arena after it was converted to a swimming pool for the swimming events
- Venue: Paris La Défense Arena
- Dates: 2 and 3 August 2024 (heats and final)
- Competitors: 82 from 16 nations
- Teams: 16 teams
- Winning time: 3:37.43 WR

Medalists
1st place, gold medalist(s)		Ryan Murphy, Nicolas Fink, Gretchen Walsh, Torri Huske, Regan Smith*, Charlie Swanson*, Caeleb Dressel*, Abbey Weitzeil*	United States
2nd place, silver medalist(s)		Xu Jiayu, Qin Haiyang, Zhang Yufei, Yang Junxuan, Tang Qianting*, Pan Zhanle*	China
3rd place, bronze medalist(s)		Kaylee McKeown, Joshua Yong, Matthew Temple, Mollie O'Callaghan, Iona Anderson*, Zac Stubblety-Cook, Emma McKeon*, Kyle Chalmers* *Indicates the swimmer only competed in the preliminary heats.	Australia

The mixed 4 × 100 metre medley relay event at the 2024 Summer Olympics was held on 2 and 3 August 2024 at Paris La Défense Arena, which was converted to a swimming pool for the swimming events. Since an Olympic size swimming pool is 50 metres long, each swimmer had to swim two lengths of the pool with their respective stroke. (Note: In medley swimming, each competitor swims one of the four strokes. In a medley relay, the stroke order is backstroke first, followed by breaststroke, then butterfly, and finally freestyle.)

The US, Australia and China were considered the most likely to win for the event, and all three of them qualified for the final. In the final, the US and China led the race, alternating the lead. The US won with a new world record of 3:37.43, China finished second with a new Asian record of 3:37.55, Australia finished third with a new Oceanian record of 3:38.76, and France finished fourth with a new national record of 3:40.96.

== Background ==
Team Great Britain won the event at the previous Olympics, but David Reider from Swimming World opined that the British team "do not have the speed to finish off the race" at this edition of the event. China won the event at the 2023 World Championships, the US won the event at the 2024 World Championships, and Australia won silver at the 2022, 2023 and 2024 World Championships. SwimSwam predicted the US would win gold, China would win silver and Australia would win bronze, while Swimming World predicted Australia would win, the US would come second and China would come third. Swimming World also opined it was "perhaps the most unpredictable event of the Games".

The event was held at Paris La Défense Arena, which was converted to a swimming pool for the swimming events.

== Qualification ==
Each National Olympic Committee could enter one team, and there were a total of sixteen qualifications places available. The first three qualifying places were taken by the podium finishers at the 2023 World Championships, and the final thirteen qualifying places were allocated to the fastest performances at the 2023 and 2024 World Championships.

== Heats ==
Two heats (preliminary rounds) took place on 2 August 2024, starting at 12:03. (Note: All times are Central European Summer Time (UTC+2)) The teams with the best eight times in the heats advanced to the final. Australia won the first heat with the second fastest qualifying time of 3:41.42, while the US won the second heat with the fastest qualifying time of 3:41.42. China, the Netherlands, Great Britain, Canada, France and Japan also all qualified, with France's quartet lowering their national record to 3:43.99 to qualify in seventh.

Caeleb Dressel's swim for the US in these heats earned him a gold medal when the US eventually won gold in the final. It was his ninth Olympic gold, which meant he joined a five-way tie for the second most Olympic gold medals of all time.

Results
Rank	Heat	Lane	Team	Swimmers	Time	Notes
1	2	5	United States	Regan Smith (57.87); Charlie Swanson (59.65); Caeleb Dressel (50.10); Abbey Weitzeil (53.36)	3:40.98	Q
2	1	4	Australia	Iona Anderson (58.81); Zac Stubblety-Cook (59.68); Emma McKeon (55.86); Kyle Chalmers (47.07)	3:41.42	Q
3	2	4	China	Xu Jiayu (53.16); Tang Qianting (1:05.44); Zhang Yufei (56.59); Pan Zhanle (47.07)	3:42.26	Q
4	1	5	Netherlands	Kai van Westering (54.25); Caspar Corbeau (59.28); Tessa Giele (57.81); Marrit Steenbergen (52.26)	3:43.60	Q
5	2	3	Great Britain	Kathleen Dawson (1:00.18); James Wilby (59.35); Joe Litchfield (51.37); Anna Hopkin (52.83)	3:43.73	Q
6	1	3	Canada	Blake Tierney (53.81); Apollo Hess (1:00.46); Maggie Mac Neil (56.14); Taylor Ruck (53.46)	3:43.87	Q
7	2	7	France	Yohann Ndoye-Brouard (52.48); Antoine Viquerat (59.91); Lilou Ressencourt (58.55); Marie Wattel (53.05)	3:43.99	Q, NR
8	2	6	Japan	Riku Matsuyama (54.83); Taku Taniguchi (59.69); Mizuki Hirai (56.52); Rikako Ikee (53.21)	3:44.25	Q
9	1	6	Germany	Ole Braunschweig (54.05); Melvin Imoudu (59.33); Angelina Köhler (56.60); Nina Holt (54.77)	3:44.75	
10	2	8	Israel	Anastasia Gorbenko (59.91); Ron Polonsky (59.56); Gal Cohen Groumi (50.84); Andrea Murez (55.02)	3:45.33	
11	1	7	Italy	Michele Lamberti (54.42); Nicolò Martinenghi (59.02); Costanza Cocconcelli (58.47); Sofia Morini (53.89)	3:45.80	
12	2	2	Sweden	Hanna Rosvall (1:00.17); Erik Persson (59.95); Sara Junevik (57.22); Robin Hanson (48.81)	3:46.15	
13	2	1	Greece	Apostolos Christou (52.83); Evangelos Nthoumas (1:00.34); Anna Ntountounaki (57.85); Theodora Drakou (55.38)	3:46.40	
14	1	2	Poland	Kacper Stokowski (54.10); Dominika Sztandera (1:07.92); Adrian Jaśkiewicz (51.87); Kornelia Fiedkiewicz (54.30)	3:48.19	
15	1	1	South Korea	Lee Eun-ji (1:01.56); Choi Dong-yeol (59.99); Kim Ji-hun (52.70); Hur Yeon-kyung (54.53)	3:48.78	
16	1	8	Brazil	Guilherme Basseto (54.32); Gabrielle Roncatto (1:16.74); Nicolas Albiero (52.27); Stephanie Balduccini (53.94)	3:57.27	

== Final ==
The final took place at 21:58 on 3 August. The US and China led the race, swimming close to each other in the first and second positions the whole way through. The US was ahead at the first exchange, China was ahead at the second exchange, and then the US was ahead at the final changeover. The US' Torri Huske held the lead for the rest of the race to win gold for the US with a new world record of 3:37.43. China finished second with a new Asian record of 3:37.55, Australia finished second with a new Oceanian record of 3:38.76, and France finished fourth with a new national record of 3:40.96.

Both the US and China swam faster than the previous world record set by Great Britain at the previous Olympics, and it was the second swimming world record of the 2024 Games. SwimSwam reported that the US got "redemption" for their fifth place finish at the previous Olympics. Every team used a female on the freestyle portions of the race and a male on the breaststroke portions of the race, while the butterfly and backstroke were interchanged between genders.

Results
Rank	Lane	Team	Swimmers	Time	Notes
1st place, gold medalist(s)	4	United States	Ryan Murphy (52.08); Nic Fink (58.29); Gretchen Walsh (55.18); Torri Huske (51.88)	3:37.43	WR
2nd place, silver medalist(s)	3	China	Xu Jiayu (52.13); Qin Haiyang (57.82); Zhang Yufei (55.64); Yang Junxuan (51.96)	3:37.55	AS
3rd place, bronze medalist(s)	5	Australia	Kaylee McKeown (57.90); Joshua Yong (58.43); Matthew Temple (50.42); Mollie O'Callaghan (52.01)	3:38.76	OC
4	1	France	Yohann Ndoye-Brouard (52.80); Leon Marchand (58.66); Marie Wattel (56.44); Beryl Gastaldello (53.06)	3:40.96	NR
5	7	Canada	Kylie Masse (58.67); Finlay Knox (59.64); Josh Liendo (50.08); Maggie Mac Neil (53.02)	3:41.41	
6	6	Netherlands	Kira Toussaint (1:00.50); Caspar Corbeau (59.04); Nyls Korstanje (51.19); Marrit Steenbergen (52.39)	3:43.12	
7	2	Great Britain	Kathleen Dawson (1:00.68); James Wilby (59.00); Duncan Scott (51.61); Anna Hopkin (53.02)	3:44.31	
8	8	Japan	Riku Matsuyama (55.00); Taku Taniguchi (1:00.48); Mizuki Hirai (56.46); Rikako Ikee (53.23)	3:45.17	
