= List of Olympic records in swimming =

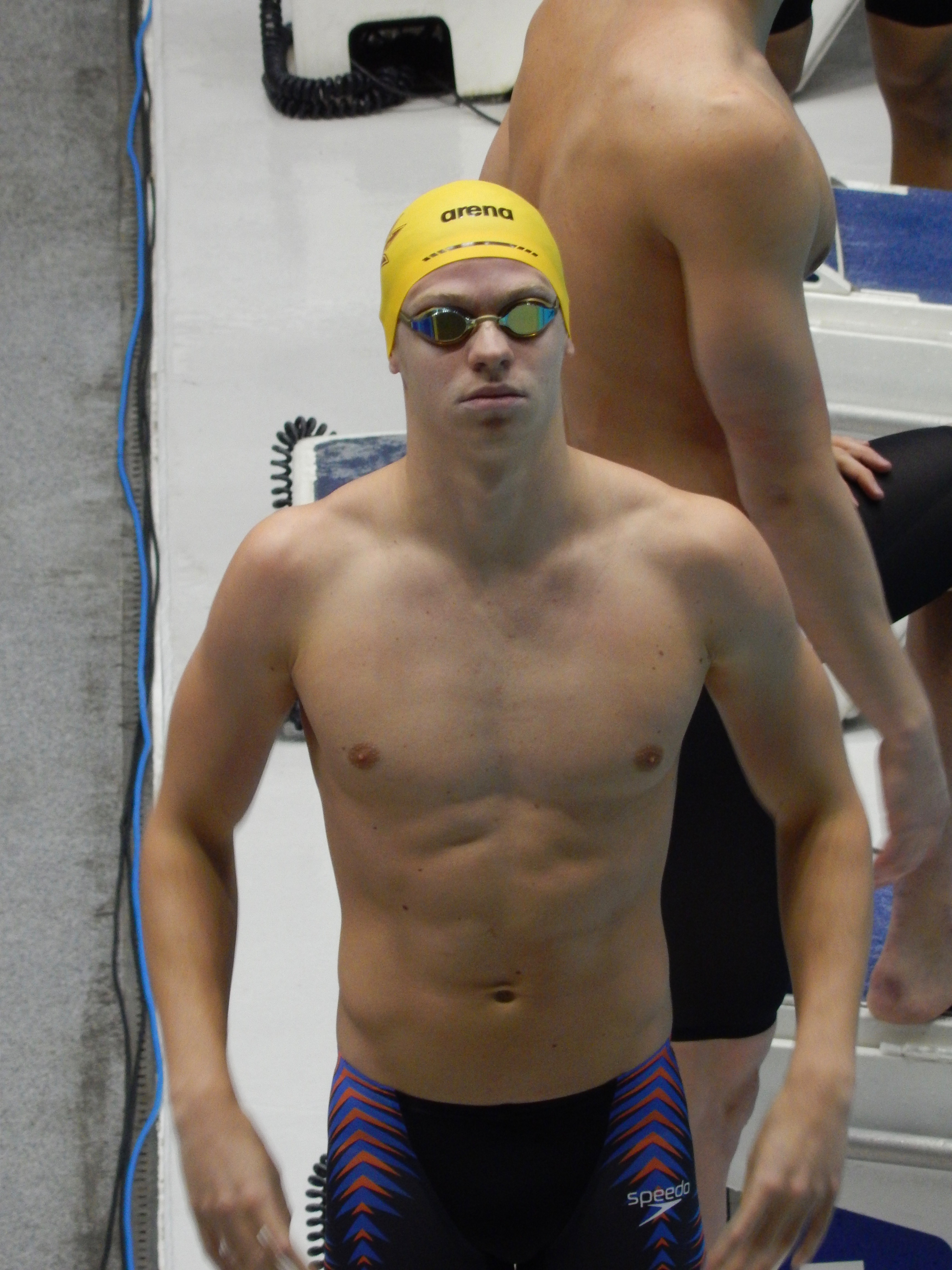
Léon Marchand set Olympic records in four individual events at the 2024 Summer Olympics.

The International Olympic Committee recognises the fastest performances in pool-based swimming events at the Olympic Games. Men's swimming has been part of the official program of the Summer Olympics since the Games' modern inception in 1896; it was not until 1912 that women's events were held. The swimming events at the 1896 Olympic Games were held in a bay in the Aegean Sea with swimmers being required to swim to the shore—Hungarian swimmer Alfréd Hajós won two gold medals that year, saying "My will to live completely overcame my desire to win." The 1900 Summer Olympic Games in Paris had the swimming events take place in the River Seine, and the events at the 1908 Summer Olympics were held in a 100-metre pool surrounded by an athletics track in the White City Stadium in London.

Races are held in four swimming categories: freestyle, backstroke, breaststroke and butterfly, over varying distances and in either individual or relay race events. Medley swimming races are also held, both individually and in relays, in which all four swimming categories are used. In the Swimming at the 2024 Summer Olympics in Paris, both men and women competed in eighteen events in the pool. Of the 35 pool-based events, swimmers from the United States hold fifteen records, Australia five, France four, China, Canada and South Africa two each, and one each to Ireland, Great Britain, Russian Olympic Committee, Hungary, and Sweden. Nineteen of the current Olympic records were set at the 2024 Summer Olympics, seven in 2020, five in 2016, one in 2012, and three in 2008.

== Men's records ==
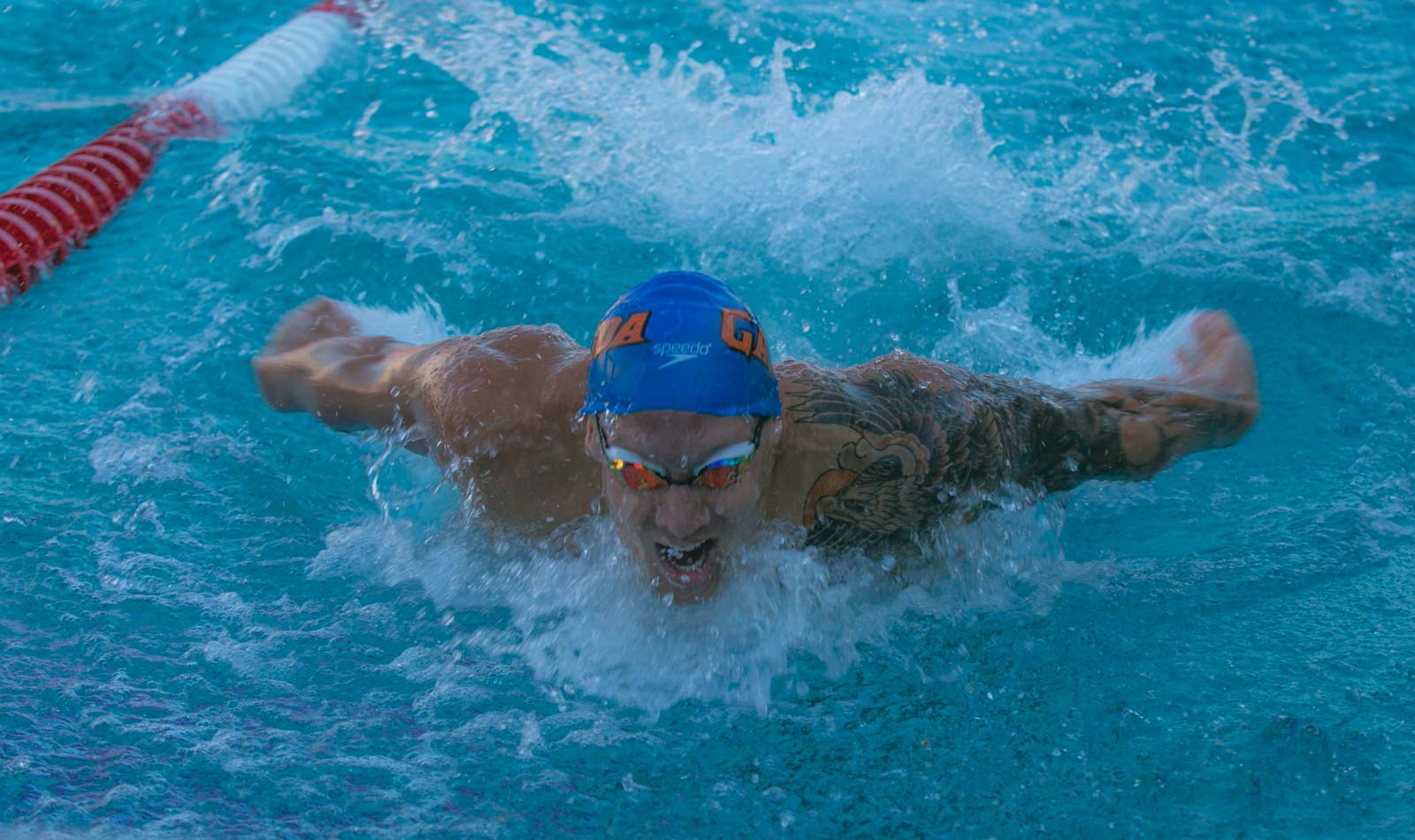
Caeleb Dressel holds Olympic records in two individual events and one relay event.

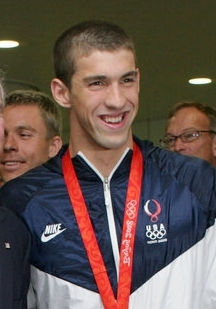
Michael Phelps holds Olympic records in one individual event and two relay events.

♦ denotes a performance that is also a current world record. Statistics are correct as of the end of the 2024 Olympics and include only those events which are currently recognised by the IOC as Olympic events.

Event	Time	Name	Nation	Games	Date	Ref
50 m freestyle	21.07	Caeleb Dressel	United States	2020 Tokyo	1 August 2021	
100 m freestyle	♦46.40	Pan Zhanle	China	2024 Paris	31 July 2024	
200 m freestyle	1:42.96	Michael Phelps	United States	2008 Beijing	12 August 2008	
400 m freestyle	3:40.14	Sun Yang	China	2012 London	28 July 2012	
800 m freestyle	7:38.19	Daniel Wiffen	Ireland	2024 Paris	30 July 2024	
1500 m freestyle	14:30.67	Bobby Finke	United States	2024 Paris	4 August 2024	
100 m backstroke	51.85	Ryan Murphy	United States	2016 Rio de Janeiro	13 August 2016	^{[A]}
200 m backstroke	1:53.27	Evgeny Rylov	ROC	2020 Tokyo	30 July 2021	
100 m breaststroke	57.13	Adam Peaty	Great Britain	2016 Rio de Janeiro	7 August 2016	
200 m breaststroke	2:05.85	Léon Marchand	France	2024 Paris	31 July 2024	
100 m butterfly	♦49.45	Caeleb Dressel	United States	2020 Tokyo	31 July 2021	
200 m butterfly	1:51.21	Léon Marchand	France	2024 Paris	31 July 2024	
200 m individual medley	1:54.06	Léon Marchand	France	2024 Paris	2 August 2024	
400 m individual medley	4:02.95	Léon Marchand	France	2024 Paris	28 July 2024	
4 × 100 m freestyle relay	♦3:08.24	Michael Phelps (47.51) Garrett Weber-Gale (47.02) Cullen Jones (47.65) Jason Lezak (46.06)	United States	2008 Beijing	11 August 2008	
4 × 200 m freestyle relay	6:58.56	Michael Phelps (1:43.31) Ryan Lochte (1:44.28) Ricky Berens (1:46.29) Peter Vanderkaay (1:44.68)	United States	2008 Beijing	13 August 2008	
4 × 100 m medley relay	♦3:26.78	Ryan Murphy (52.31) Michael Andrew (58.49) Caeleb Dressel (49.03) Zach Apple (46.95)	United States	2020 Tokyo	1 August 2021	

== Women's records ==
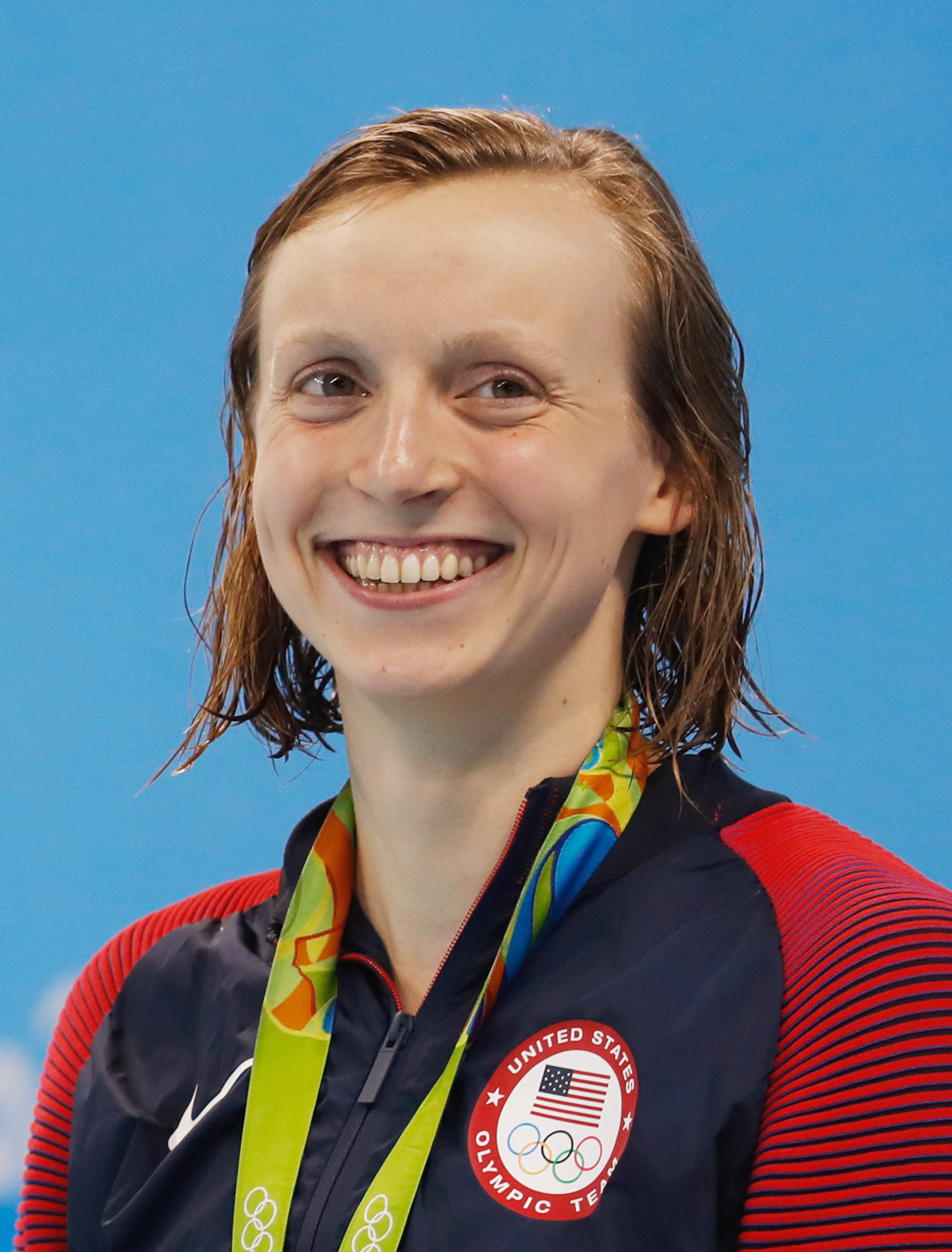
Katie Ledecky holds Olympic records in the 400, 800, and 1500 m freestyle events

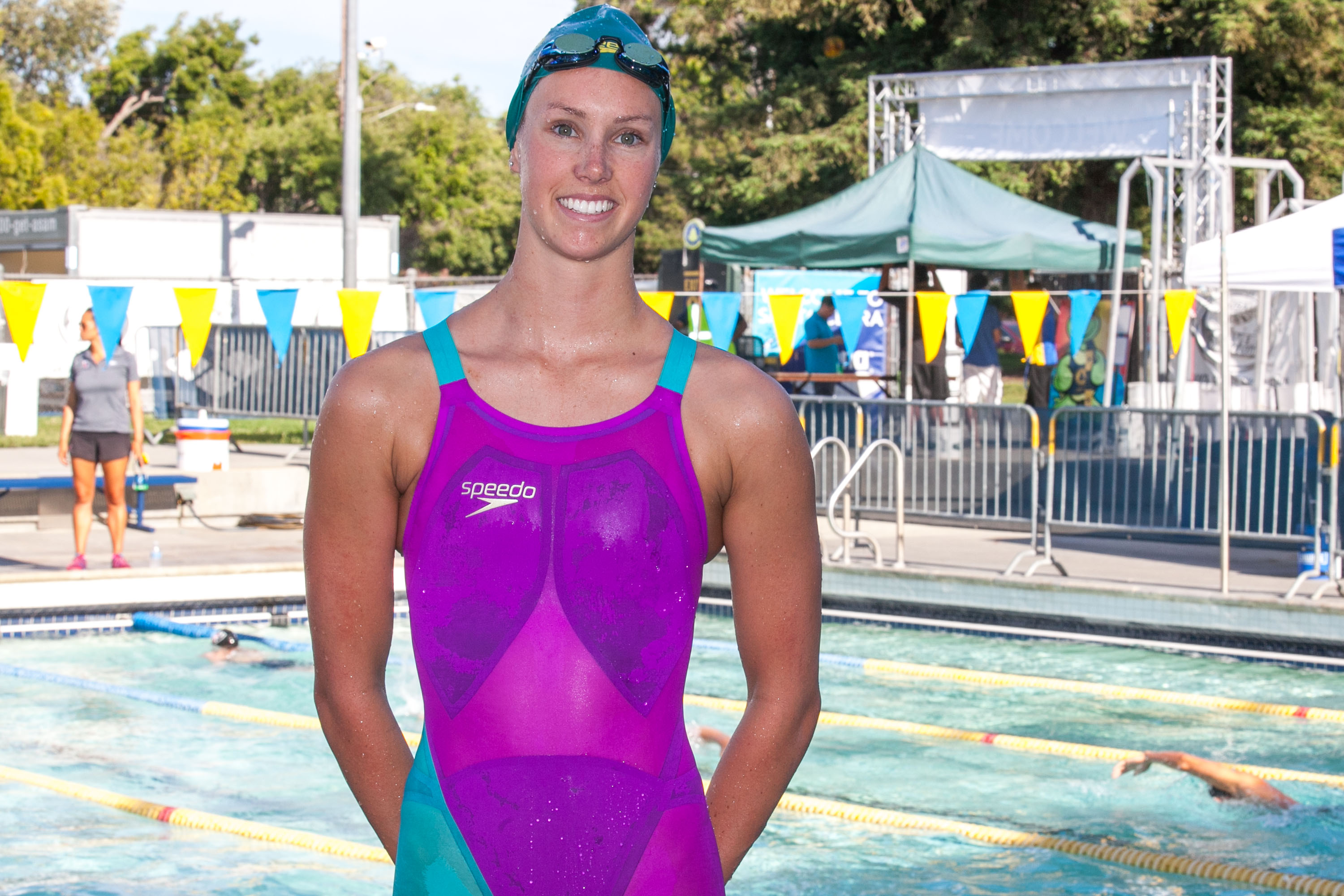
Emma McKeon holds Olympic records in one individual and one relay event.

♦ denotes a performance that is also a current world record. Statistics are correct as of the end of the 2024 Olympics and include only those events which are currently recognised by the IOC as Olympic events.

Event	Time	Name	Nation	Games	Date	Ref
50 m freestyle	23.66	Sarah Sjöström	Sweden	2024 Paris	3 August 2024	^{[B]}
100 m freestyle	51.96	Emma McKeon	Australia	2020 Tokyo	30 July 2021	
200 m freestyle	1:53.27	Mollie O'Callaghan	Australia	2024 Paris	29 July 2024	
400 m freestyle	3:56.46	Katie Ledecky	United States	2016 Rio de Janeiro	7 August 2016	
800 m freestyle	8:04.79	Katie Ledecky	United States	2016 Rio de Janeiro	12 August 2016	
1500 m freestyle	15:30.02	Katie Ledecky	United States	2024 Paris	31 July 2024	
100 m backstroke	57.28	Regan Smith	United States	2024 Paris	4 August 2024	^{[C]}
200 m backstroke	2:03.73	Kaylee McKeown	Australia	2024 Paris	2 August 2024	
100 m breaststroke	1:04.82	Tatjana Smith	South Africa	2020 Tokyo	25 July 2021	^{[D]}
200 m breaststroke	2:18.95	Tatjana Smith	South Africa	2020 Tokyo	30 July 2021	
100 m butterfly	55.38	Gretchen Walsh	United States	2024 Paris	27 July 2024	^{[E]}
200 m butterfly	2:03.03	Summer McIntosh	Canada	2024 Paris	1 August 2024	
200 m individual medley	2:06.56	Summer McIntosh	Canada	2024 Paris	3 August 2024	
400 m individual medley	4:26.36	Katinka Hosszú	Hungary	2016 Rio de Janeiro	6 August 2016	
4 × 100 m freestyle relay	3:28.92	Mollie O'Callaghan (52.24) Shayna Jack (52.35) Emma McKeon (52.39) Meg Harris (51.94)	Australia	2024 Paris	27 July 2024	
4 × 200 m freestyle relay	7:38:08	Mollie O'Callaghan (1:53.52) Lani Pallister (1:55.61) Brianna Throssell (1:56.00) Ariarne Titmus (1:52.95)	Australia	2024 Paris	1 August 2024	
4 × 100 m medley relay	3:49.63	Regan Smith (57.28) Lilly King (1:04.90) Gretchen Walsh (55.03) Torri Huske (52.42)	United States	2024 Paris	4 August 2024	

== Mixed records ==
♦ denotes a performance that is also a current world record. Statistics are correct as of the end of the 2024 Olympics and include only those events which are currently recognised by the IOC as Olympic events.

Event	Time	Name	Nation	Games	Date	Ref
4 × 100 m medley relay	3:37.43	Ryan Murphy (52.08) Nicolas Fink (58.29) Gretchen Walsh (55.18) Torri Huske (51.88)	United States	2024 Paris	3 August 2024	

== Footnotes ==
1. Ryan Murphy broke the men's 100 m backstroke world record in the final of the men's 4 × 100 m medley relay.
2. Sarah Sjöström broke the Olympic record in semifinal 2 of the women's 50 m freestyle.
3. Regan Smith broke the women's 100 m backstroke Olympic record in the final of the women's 4 × 100 m medley relay.
4. Tatjana Smith broke the Olympic record in heat 5 of the women's 100 m breaststroke.
5. Gretchen Walsh broke the Olympic record in semifinal 1 of the women's 100 m butterfly.
