= Matthew Fallon =

American swimmer (born 2002)

Matt Fallon
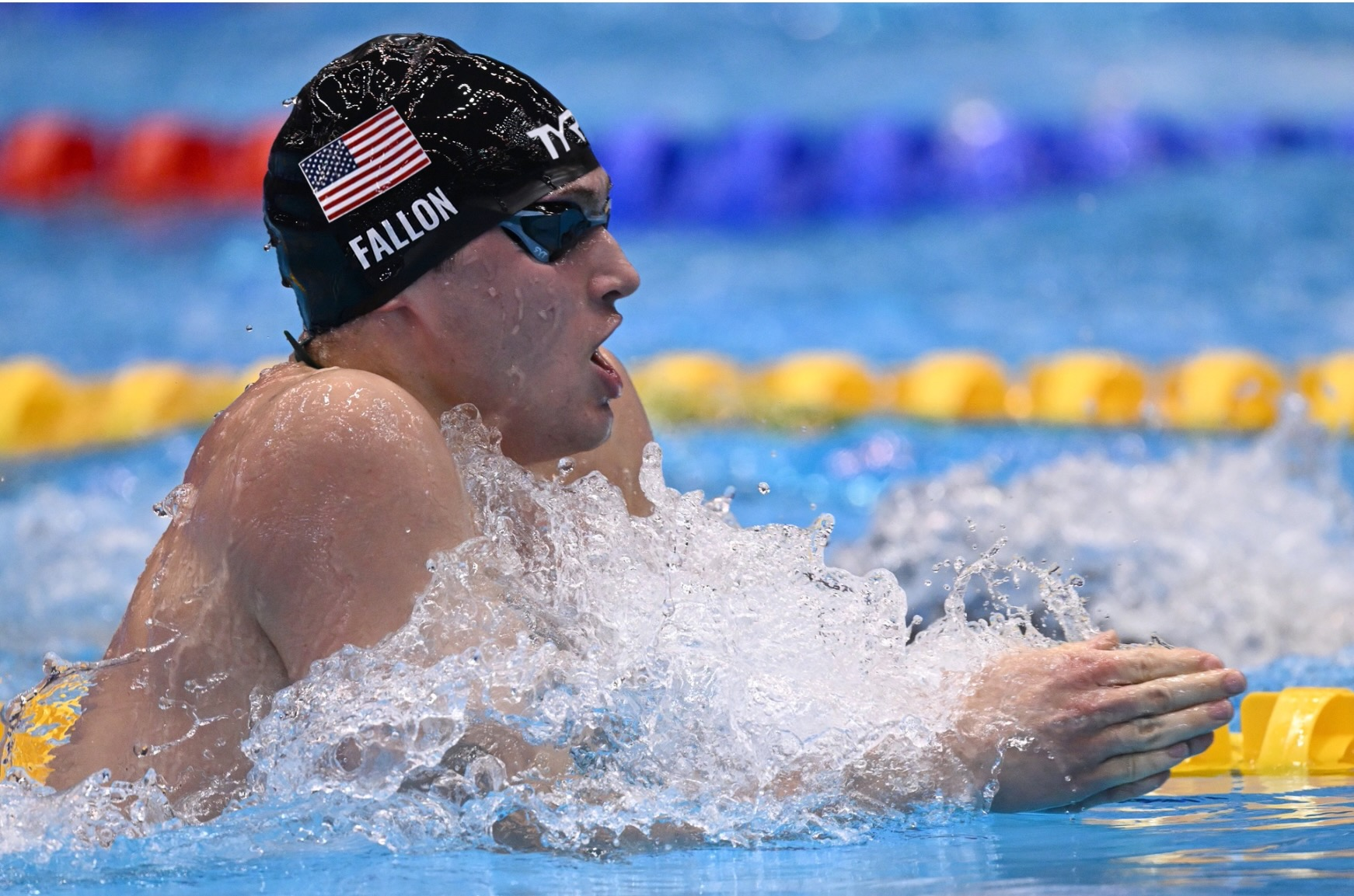
- Fallon in 2024

Personal information
- Full name: Matthew Joseph Fallon
- Nationality: American
- Born: October 3, 2002 (age 23) Warren, New Jersey, U.S.
- Height: 6 ft 1 in (185 cm)
- Weight: 195 lb (88 kg)

Sport
- Country: United States
- Sport: Men's swimming
- Strokes: Breaststroke
- Club: GSCY
- College team: University of Pennsylvania
- Coach: Mike Schnur
Medal record
Men's swimming
Representing the United States
World Championships (LC)
Bronze medal – third place	2023 Fukuoka	200 m breaststroke
NCAA Championships
Silver medal – second place	2024 Indianapolis	200 breaststroke
Bronze medal – third place	2022 Atlanta	200 breaststroke

Matthew Joseph Fallon (born October 3, 2002) is an American competitive swimmer and 2024 Summer Olympics team member for the United States. Fallon qualified for Paris at the 2024 US Olympic Swimming Team Trials where he placed first and set a new American record in the 200 meter (m) breaststroke.

== Life ==
Fallon was raised in Warren Township, New Jersey,, attended HudsonWay Immersion School and then graduated from the nearby Pingry School in 2021. As of 2026, he is a senior at the University of Pennsylvania where he competes on the men's swimming team.

He holds the American record in the 200m breaststroke at 2:06.54.

== Club and High School Career ==
As a club swimmer, Fallon competed for the Greater Somerset County YMCA (GSCY). Notable swims include a 3:44.03 in the 400 yard (y) individual medley as a 16 year old in 2019 and, at 18 in 2021, a 1:51.39 in the 200y breaststroke, just .01 seconds shy of breaking the US National Age Group record. Across his career in YMCA swimming, Fallon won numerous titles and set many national records.

As a high school swimmer, Fallon won NJSIAA titles in the 100y breaststroke, 200y individual medley, and several relays. In his junior and senior years at the Pingry School, Fallon set national independent school records in the 400m freestyle, the 100m breaststroke, and the 200m individual medley.

In 2019, Fallon competed for GSCY at the Phillips 66 National Championships in Palo Alto, California. In the 200m breaststroke, Fallon placed second among juniors and so qualified for the 2019 World Junior Championships in Budapest, Hungary. Fallon subsequently placed 19th in July at the World Junior Championships.

In 2021 during Covid, Fallon moved to Florida temporarily to prepare for the 2021 Olympic Trials where he trained under Coach Fred Lewis of St Petersburg Aquatics. In the 200m breaststroke at trials, Fallon qualified first in the preliminaries, first in the semis, but then a disappointing eighth in the finals. However, his semi-final time of 2:08.91 set a new US National Age Group record, and he was named male “junior swimmer of the meet” by Swimswam.com.

== Collegiate and International Career ==
Since 2021, Fallon has swum for the University of Pennsylvania where he is coached by Mike Schnur. As a freshman at NCAAs in 2022, Fallon ultimately placed 3rd in the 200y breaststroke after swimming a prelims time of 1:49.03, making him the second fastest freshman ever (and the fastest American freshman) in the event. He also placed 10th in the 100y breaststroke with a time of 51.45.

In the summer of 2022, Fallon trained at the University of Georgia where he was coached by Neil Versfeld. Fallon skipped World Championship Team Trials that May due to school conflicts but returned to competition at the end of July, winning the 200m breaststroke title at the 2022 National Championships in Irvine, California with a time of 2:07.91.

The 2022-23 collegiate season proved a bit tumultuous. At the Zippy Invitational in December, Fallon won the 200y IM, 100 yard breaststroke and the 200y breaststroke, the latter in 1:50.28, an NCAA leading performance at the time. Later that season, Fallon competed at the Ivy League Championships at Brown University in February 2023 after sustaining a back injury in practice the day before traveling to the meet. There, he swam the 500y freestyle, 100y breaststroke and the 200y breaststroke events, earning 10th, 3rd and 3rd places respectively. Unfortunately, he was unable to compete at NCAA championships in March due to the same injury.

In May 2023, Fallon returned to Georgia to train prior to the Phillips 66 National Championships in June. Again, Fallon won a national title in the 200m breaststroke in 2:07.71, which earned him the opportunity to compete at the 2023 World Championships in Fukuoka, Japan. There in July, Fallon placed third in the 200m breaststroke behind Qin Hai-Yang (of China, who set a new world record), and Zac Stubbelty-Cook (of Australia, the previous world record holder). Fallon’s come-from-behind performance was on display, as he moved from last at the halfway point to ultimately earn a bronze medal.

In the 2023-24 collegiate season, Fallon competed in the Toyota US Open Championships in November, winning the 200m breaststroke and establishing a new US Open meet record in 2:09.49. Earlier in the meet, he swam his fastest ever 100m breaststroke, breaking the minute barrier (59.92) to finish fifth.

A few months later at the Ivy League conference championships, Fallon swam a lifetime best in the preliminaries of the 500y freestyle with a time of 4:17.31, the second fastest performer in Quaker history (behind only NCAA champion Chris Swanson) but ended up fourth in the final. Later in the meet, he swam to a second place finish in the 100y breaststroke and won his final individual event, the 200 yard breaststroke in a nation leading time of 1:49.75, breaking the Blodgett Pool and Ivy League Championship Meet records. At NCAAs in March, Fallon came in second to Leon Marchand in the 200 yard breaststroke where he swam a best time of 1:48.45, becoming the third fastest performer ever in the event and earning first team All-America honors.

After NCAAs, Fallon continued to train at Penn under his primary coach Mike Schnur in preparation for the US Olympic Trials. In April at the TYR Pro Series stop in San Antonio, Fallon became the first swimmer in more than two years to beat Leon Marchand in any event in a major competition. In the 200m breaststroke, Fallon surged in the final 50m to win in 2:08.18 to Marchand’s 2:08.40, setting a new Pro Series record.

== 2024 Olympic Trials and Paris Olympics ==
At the 2024 Olympic Trials in Indianapolis, Indiana, Fallon placed 10th in the 100m breaststroke and failed to qualify for finals. However, in the 200m breaststroke, Fallon earned a spot on the US Olympic Team with a 2:06.54, winning the event by more than two seconds. His time broke the US Open record, the Olympic Trials record, as well as the eight-year-old American record of Josh Prenot. This time moved Fallon to #1 in the world for 2024 and #5 on the world all-time list.

At the 33rd Olympiad in Paris, France, Fallon contracted a virus shortly before his event. Swimming ill, he tied for 10th in the semi-finals of the 200m breaststroke with a time of 2:09.96 and failed to qualify for the Olympic final by 0.07 seconds.
