= Ippei Watanabe (swimmer) =

Japanese swimmer (born 1997)

Personal information
- Nationality: Japanese
- Born: 18 March 1997 (age 29) Tsukumi, Ōita, Japan
- Height: 1.93 m (6 ft 4 in)
- Weight: 80 kg (176 lb)

Sport
- Sport: Swimming
- Strokes: Breaststroke
Medal record
World Championships (LC)
Silver medal – second place	2025 Singapore	200 m breaststroke
Bronze medal – third place	2017 Budapest	200 m breaststroke
Bronze medal – third place	2019 Gwangju	200 m breaststroke
Pan Pacific Championships
Gold medal – first place	2018 Tokyo	200 m breaststroke
Asian Games
Silver medal – second place	2018 Jakarta	200 m breaststroke
Silver medal – second place	2018 Jakarta	4×100 m medley
Silver medal – second place	2018 Jakarta	4×100 m mixed medley
Silver medal – second place	2022 Hangzhou	4×100 m mixed medley
Asian Championships
Gold medal – first place	2016 Tokyo	100 m breaststroke
Gold medal – first place	2016 Tokyo	200 m breaststroke
Youth Olympic Games
Gold medal – first place	2014 Nanjing	200 m breaststroke

Ippei Watanabe (渡辺 一平, Watanabe Ippei; born 18 March 1997) is a Japanese swimmer and former world record holder in the 200 metre breaststroke.

== Career ==
He competed in the men's 100 metre breaststroke event at the 2016 Summer Olympics. On 9 August 2016, Watanabe broke the Olympic record for the men's 200 metre breaststroke event at the 2016 Summer Olympics during the semi-final. In the final, he finished 6th.

At the Kosuke Kitajima Cup in Tokyo he broke the long course 200 metre breaststroke world record in a time of 2:06.67. He is also the first swimmer ever to go under 2:07.

Records
Preceded by (Japan) Akihiro Yamaguchi	Men's 200 metre breaststroke world record holder (long course); 29 January 2017 – 26 July 2019	Succeeded by (Russia) Anton Chupkov
