= Turn (swimming) =

Reversal of direction of travel by a swimmer

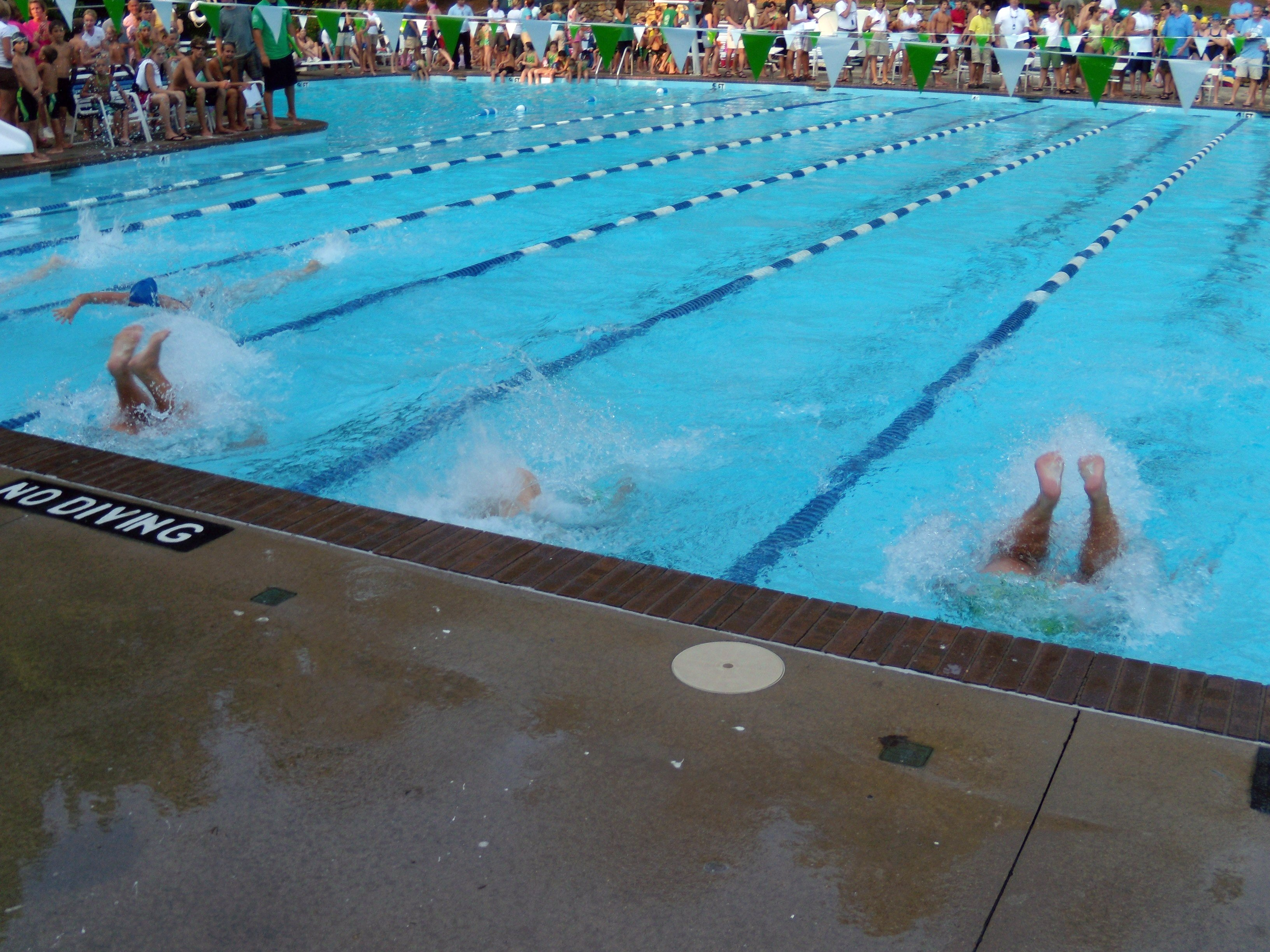
Flip turns in swimming.

In swimming, a turn is a reversal of direction of travel by a swimmer. A turn is typically performed when a swimmer reaches the end of a swimming pool but still has one or more remaining pool lengths to swim. In competitions, there are judges or pressure pads in each lane to verify that a swimmer has touched the end wall while turning. A short course race has more turns than the same-distance long course race, and the world record will be quicker because of the leverage provided by push-off turns.

== Types ==
- Open turn: the swimmer touches the wall, with one or two hands depending on the requirement for the stroke, and brings legs to the wall in a tuck-like position, then turns on the wall to face the opposite end of the pool and pushes off in a streamline position to begin a new lap. Butterfly and breaststroke swimmers must touch with two hands, then one arm is typically dropped into the water to begin the turn while the other comes past the head to complete the turnaround from the wall and then the swimmer will push off into a streamline. See also Butterfly stroke#Turn and finish.
- Tumble turn (also known as flip turn or turntable turn): the swimmer swims to the end wall, tucks, does a forward flip, and pushes off in streamline. While typically only done in backstroke and freestyle modalities, it is legal in all events provided that in butterfly and breaststroke both hands touch the wall simultaneously and immediately prior to the turn. See also Front crawl#Racing: turn and finish.
- Backwards flip turn, bucket turn, or suicide turn: a turn used in the individual medley when changing from backstroke to breaststroke. The turn involves a touch on the wall in backstroke, followed by a back flip which puts the swimmer in position to push off into breaststroke.
- Crossover turn: a turn used in individual medley in the backstroke-to-breaststroke transition. In one fluid motion, the swimmer touches the wall on their back, rotates onto their front, and does a front flip. They then push off in streamline for breaststroke.

== See also ==
- Swimming innovation
