= Flag of Iceland =

Iceland
- Use: Civil flag and ensign
- Proportion: 18:25
- Adopted: 17 June 1944; 82 years ago (standardisation from 1918)
- Design: A blue field with the white-edged red Nordic cross that extends to the edges; the vertical part of the cross is shifted to the hoist side. In Blazon, "Azure, a cross gules fimbriated argent".
- Designed by: Matthías Þórðarson
- Use: State and war flag, state and naval ensign
- Proportion: 9:16

The flag of the president of Iceland. It has an aspect ratio of 9:16.

The flag of the Icelandic Customs Service. It has an aspect ratio of 9:16.

The flag of Iceland (Icelandic: íslenski fáninn) is defined in Law No. 34/1944, adopted on 17 June 1944, the day Iceland became a republic. The law, entitled The Law of the National Flag of Icelanders and the State Arms, describes the flag as follows:

The civil national flag of Icelanders is sky-blue with a snow-white cross and a fiery-red cross inside the white cross. The arms of the crosses extend to the edges of the flag and their width is 2/9, and the red cross 1/9 of the width of the flag. The blue sections are rectangles: the hoist sections are equilateral, and the outer sections are the same width as them but twice as long. The ratio between the width and length of the flag is 18:25.

A blue-and-white flag (a white Nordic cross on a blue field) was used as an unofficial national symbol from the late 19th century and was first displayed publicly in 1897. The present design dates from 1915, when a red cross was added within the white cross, in part to distinguish the flag from similar designs. As with other Nordic cross flags, the cross is traditionally associated with Christianity.

The flag was adopted as the national flag of Iceland when Iceland was granted sovereignty by Denmark in 1918. The colours are commonly interpreted as representing elements of the country's landscape: red for volcanic fire, white for ice and snow, and blue for the mountains and surrounding sea.

== History ==
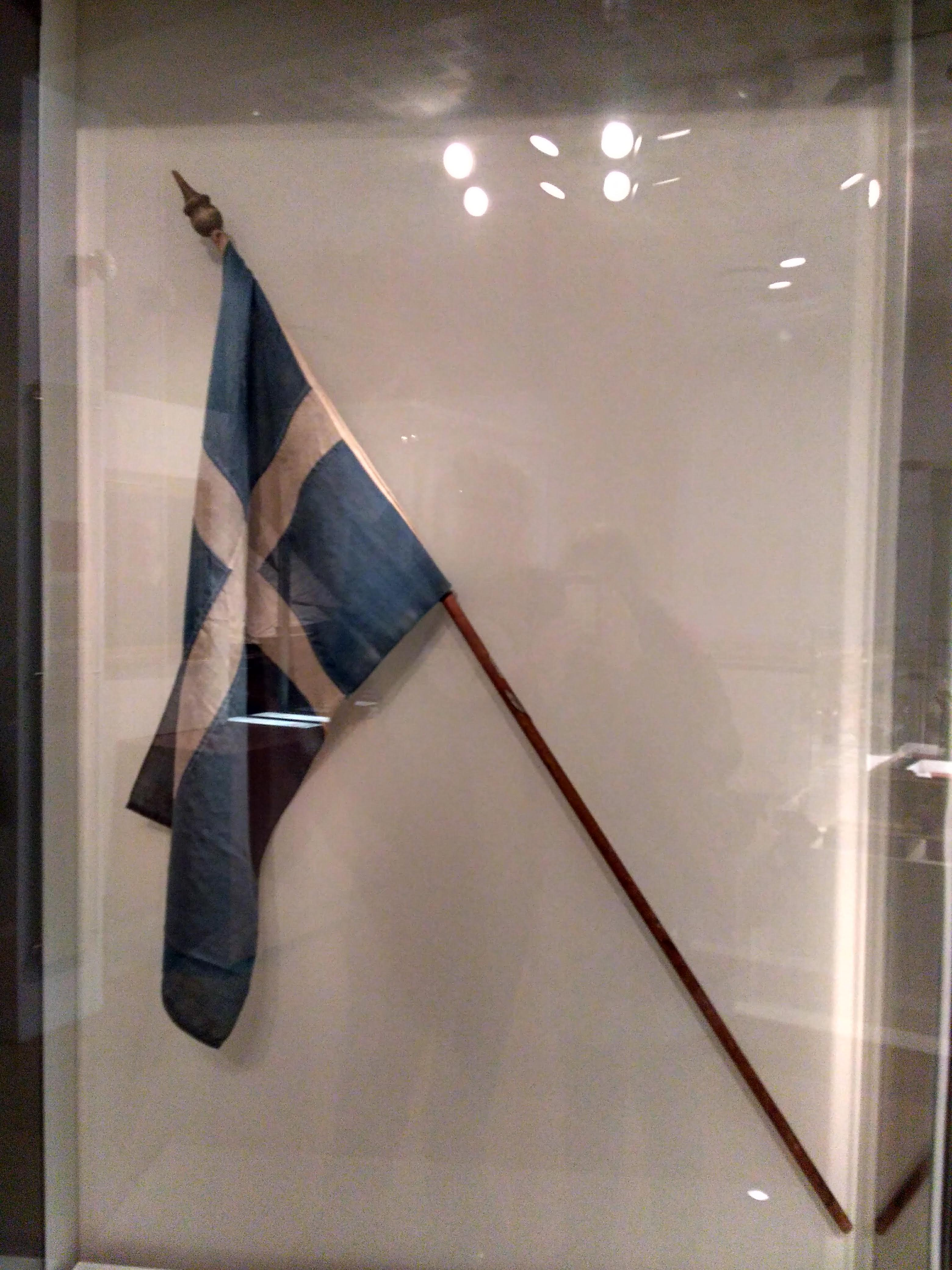
Old Icelandic flag (which was never an official flag) in the National Museum of Iceland, in Reykjavik, Iceland.

According to a legend cited by Andrew Evans' Iceland, the Danish Dannebrog originated when a red cloth with a white cross fell from the sky during the 13th-century Battle of Valdemar. In this account, Denmark used the cross motif throughout its Nordic territories as a symbol of divine favour; as the Nordic countries later gained independence, they retained the cross as a traditional emblem.

The Icelandic civil flag was used unofficially from the late 19th century, originally as a white cross on a blue field. The current design was adopted on 19 June 1915, when King Kristján X issued a decree allowing it to be flown in Icelandic territorial waters (where the Danish flag had previously been required) and specifying the addition of a red cross to distinguish it from similar foreign flags. The colours are often described as referring to Iceland's natural features: blue for the mountains, white for snow and ice, and red for volcanic fire.

The civil flag as it appeared between 1918 and 1944, when the blue colour was classified as "ultramarine blue". It has an aspect ratio of 18:25.

A former flag which never became official, known as Hvítbláinn (lit. 'the white-blue'), in use by Icelandic republicans around 1900. A very similar design has subsequently been adopted as the flag of Shetland.

A flag proposed in 1914

== Laws regarding the flag ==
On 17 June 1944, the day Iceland became a republic, a law was enacted governing the national flag and the coat of arms. Subsequent legislation and regulations have supplemented the original act, including measures adopted in 1991 concerning official flag days and flag times, as well as the specification of the flag's colours.

The act sets out the dimensions of the civil flag and of official variants used by state institutions, including those used by diplomatic missions and the Ministry of Foreign Affairs. It also regulates how the flag is to be displayed in different contexts, such as on flagpoles, buildings, and vessels.

Under the act, the use of the flag is regulated and subject to conditions. It requires that the flag be treated with respect and kept in good condition, and provides penalties for acts or speech deemed to show disrespect towards the flag, including fines or imprisonment of up to one year.

The 1944 act envisaged separate rules on official flag days and flag times; these provisions were not implemented until 1991. Under the 1991 rules, the flag may not be flown before 07:00 and should normally be taken down by sunset; it must not, in any case, remain flown after midnight. Exceptions are provided for outdoor assemblies, official gatherings, funerals, and memorials, where the flag may remain flown for the duration of the event, but not beyond midnight.

== Icelandic flag days ==
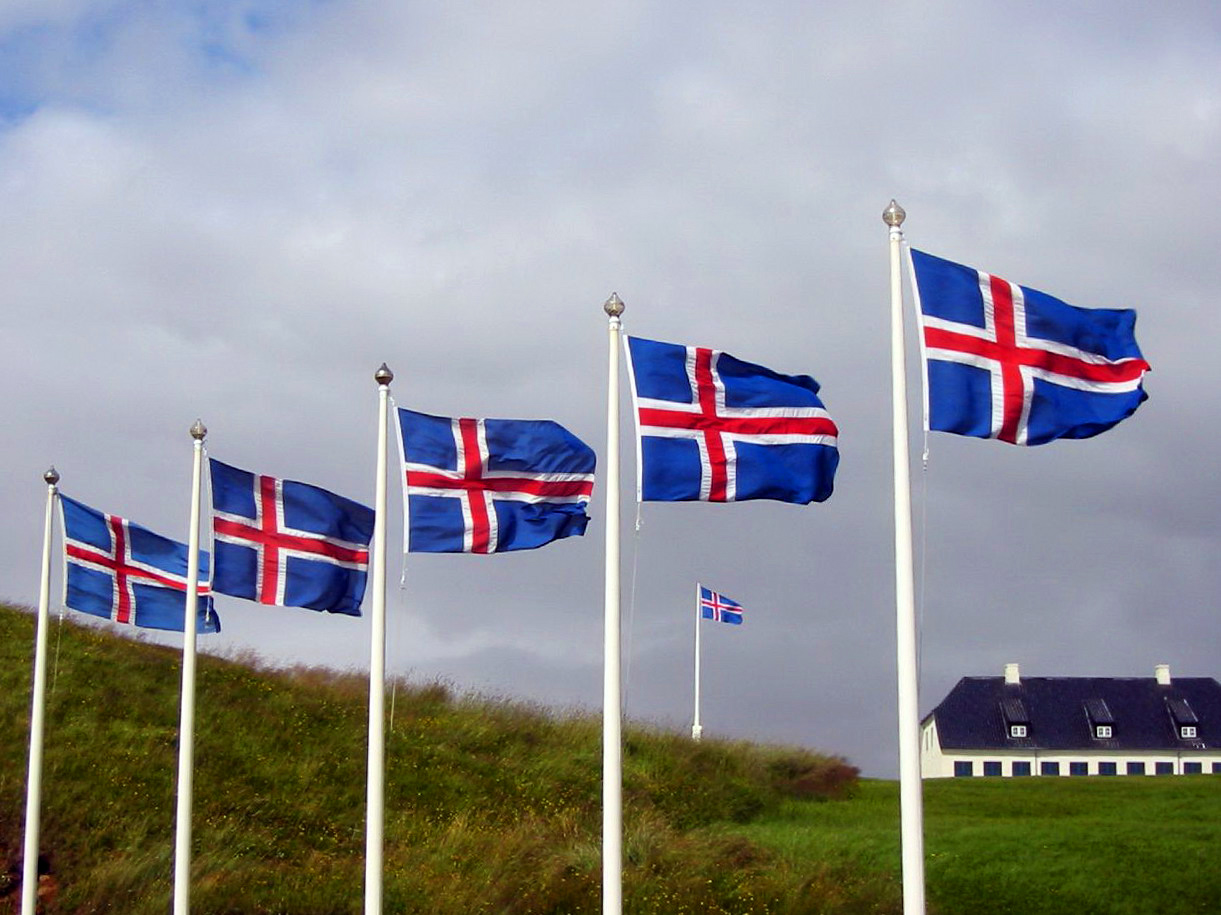
Icelandic flags in Viðey

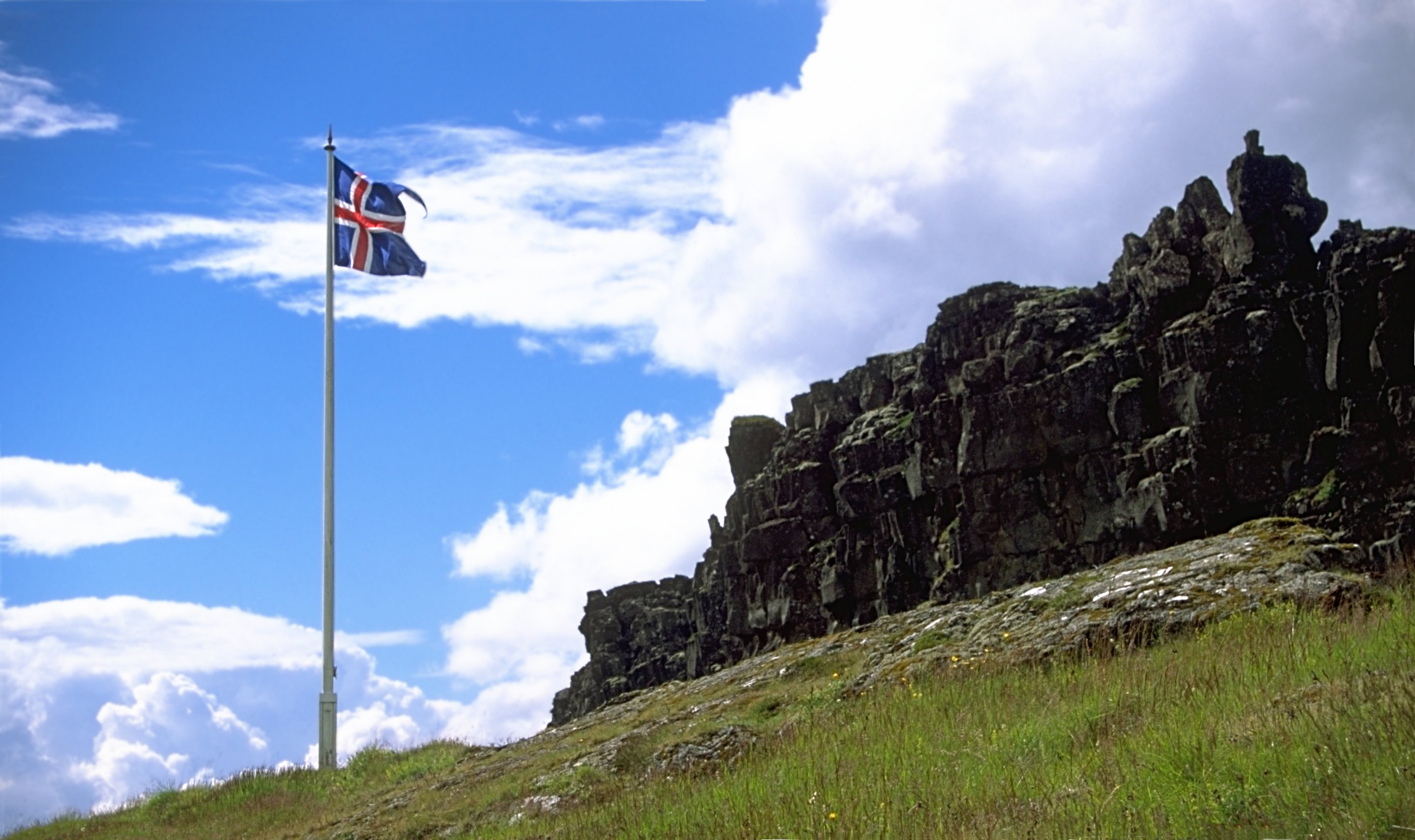
The Icelandic flag in Þingvellir National Park

According to Law No. 5 of 23 January 1991, the following are nationally sanctioned flag days. On these days, the flag is to be flown at state buildings and at institutions under the supervision of state authorities and official representatives. The Prime Minister's Office may announce additional flag days each year. On flag days the flag is flown fully hoisted, except on Good Friday, when it is flown at half-mast.

- The birthday of the president of Iceland, currently 11 October
- New Year's Day
- Good Friday
- Easter
- First Day of Summer
- 1 May (Baráttudagur verkalýðsins, fyrsti maí)
- Pentecost
- Sailor's Day (Sjómannadagurinn)
- Icelandic National Day
- Icelandic Language Day
- Sovereignty Day (Fullveldisdagurinn, 1 December)
- Christmas

== The state flag ==
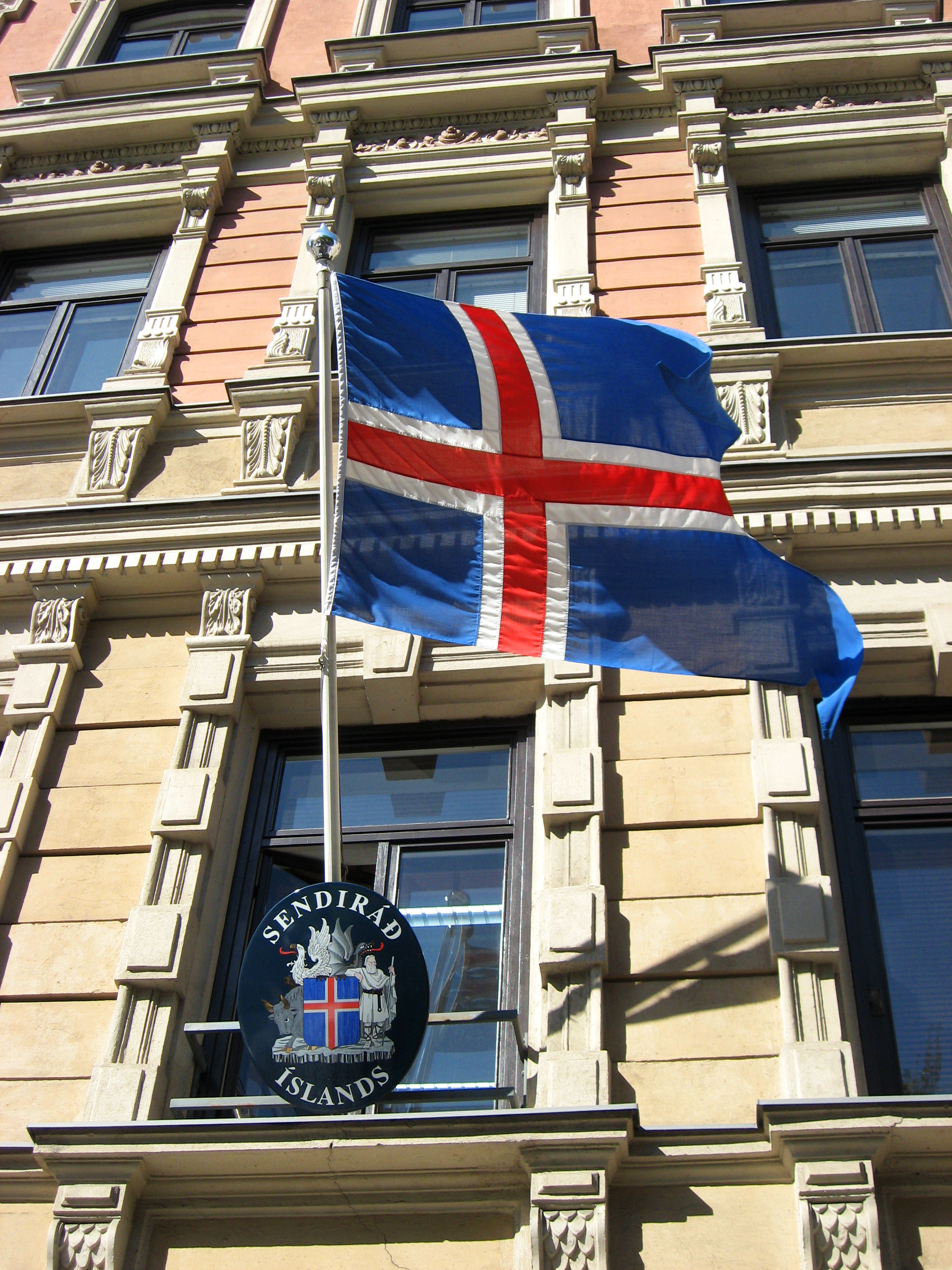
Icelandic state flag at the Embassy in Helsinki.

The Icelandic state flag (Ríkisfáni), also known as the Tjúgufáni, was first flown on 1 December 1918 from the Ministry offices, although detailed rules on its use were not finalised until 12 February 1919.

The state flag is flown on government buildings and embassies, and may also be used on other buildings when they are in official use by the state. It serves as the naval ensign of the Icelandic Coast Guard, and may be flown by state vessels and other ships in official service.

The customs service flag is flown at buildings and checkpoints used by the Directorate of Customs, and may also be used by vessels operated by the Directorate.

The presidential flag is flown at the President's residences and used on vehicles transporting the President.

== Colours of the flag ==
Official colour specifications for the Icelandic flag were issued in 1991. The law refers to the Standard Colour of Textile (Dictionnaire International de la Couleur) system, and the Government of Iceland has also published equivalents in widely used colour systems, including Pantone, CMYK, RGB, hex triplet and Avery.

Scheme	Blue	White	Red
SCOTDIC	693009	95	ICELAND FLAG RED

Scheme	Blue	White	Red
Hex	#02529C	#FFFFFF	#DC1E35
RGB	2, 82, 156	255, 255, 255	220, 30, 53
Pantone	287	1c	199
CMYK	100, 75, 2, 18	0, 0, 0, 0	0, 100, 72, 0
Avery	520	501	503

== Construction sheets ==
National and merchant flag

State and war flag, state and naval ensign

== See also ==
- Nordic Cross flag
- List of flags with blue, red, white in them and flags with three colours.
- Coat of arms of Iceland
- List of Icelandic flags
- Flag of Norway
- Flag of Sweden
- Flag of Denmark
