= Icelandic Swimming Association =

Sports governing body in Iceland

LEN
- Association crest
- Founded: 1951
- FINA affiliation: 1951
- LEN affiliation: xxxx
- President: Hörður J. Oddfríðarson

The Icelandic Swimming Association (Icelandic: Sundsamband Íslands - SSÍ) is the national governing body for aquatics in Iceland. It is affiliated to both LEN and FINA.

SSÍ brings together all the swimming clubs in the country, organizes the national championships and manages the national team.
