= France at the 2013 World Aquatics Championships =

- Flag of France
- World Aquatics code: FRA
- National federation: Fédération Française de Natation
- Website: www.ffnatation.fr

in Barcelona, Spain
- Competitors: 50 in 5 sports
- Medals Ranked 4th: Gold 4 Silver 1 Bronze 4 Total 9

World Aquatics Championships appearances
- 1973; 1975; 1978; 1982; 1986; 1991; 1994; 1998; 2001; 2003; 2005; 2007; 2009; 2011; 2013; 2015; 2017; 2019; 2022; 2023; 2024; 2025

France competed at the 2013 World Aquatics Championships in Barcelona, Spain between 19 July and 4 August 2013.

== Medalists ==
Medal	Name	Sport	Event	Date
Gold	Yannick Agnel; Fabien Gilot; Amaury Leveaux*; Grégory Mallet*; Florent Manaudou; William Meynard*; Jérémy Stravius	Swimming	Men's 4 × 100 m freestyle relay	28 July
Gold	Yannick Agnel	Swimming	Men's 200 m freestyle	30 July
Gold	Camille Lacourt	Swimming	Men's 50 m backstroke	4 August
Gold	Fabien Gilot; Camille Lacourt; Giacomo Perez d'Ortona; Jérémy Stravius	Swimming	Men's 4 × 100 m medley relay	4 August
Silver	Jérémy Stravius	Swimming	Men's 50 m backstroke	4 August
Bronze	Frédérick Bousquet	Swimming	Men's 50 m butterfly	29 July
Bronze	Jérémy Stravius	Swimming	Men's 100 m backstroke	30 July
Bronze	Camille Muffat	Swimming	Women's 200 m freestyle	31 July
Bronze	Coralie Balmy; Charlotte Bonnet; Mylène Lazare; Camille Muffat; Isabelle Mabboux*	Swimming	Women's 4 × 200 m freestyle relay	1 August

== Diving ==
France qualified four quota places for the following diving events:

Men

Athlete	Event	Preliminaries		Semifinals		Final	
Athlete	Event	Points	Rank	Points	Rank	Points	Rank
Matthieu Rosset	1 m springboard	404.95	2 Q	—		409.45	6

Women

Athlete	Event	Preliminaries		Semifinals		Final	
Athlete	Event	Points	Rank	Points	Rank	Points	Rank
Maxime Eouzan	1 m springboard	209.60	30	—		did not advance	
Marion Farissier	1 m springboard	209.60	30	—		did not advance	
Laura Marino	10 m platform	298.65	14 Q	303.25	10 Q	289.70	12

== High diving ==
France qualified two quota places for the following high diving event. Hassan Mouti was initially entered but did not compete.

Athlete	Event	Points	Rank
Cyrille Oumedjkane	Men's high diving	403.35	12

== Open water swimming ==
France qualified seven quota places for the following events in open water swimming:

Men

Athlete	Event	Time	Rank
Damien Cattin-Vidal	5 km	53:38.4	9
Damien Cattin-Vidal	10 km	1:49:19.8	4
Axel Reymond	10 km	1:50:33.0	40
Axel Reymond	25 km	4:53:47.2	20
Bertrand Venturi	25 km	4:48:58.3	12
Enzo Vial-Collet	5 km	53:59.6	29

Women

Athlete	Event	Time	Rank
Ophélie Aspord	5 km	57:06.3	18
Ophélie Aspord	10 km	1:58:23.2	6
Celia Barrot	10 km	1:58:41.8	25
Celia Barrot	25 km	5:20:31.8	12
Aurélie Muller	5 km	56:46.5	9

Mixed

Athlete	Event	Time	Rank
Damien Cattin-Vidal; Bertrand Venturi; Aurélie Muller	Team	55:26.3	7

== Swimming ==
French swimmers achieved qualifying standards in the following events (up to a maximum of 2 swimmers in each event at the A-standard entry time, and 1 at the B-standard):

Men

Athlete	Event	Heat		Semifinal		Final	
Athlete	Event	Time	Rank	Time	Rank	Time	Rank
Yannick Agnel	200 m freestyle	1:47.40	6 Q	1:47.01	5 Q	1:44.20	1st place, gold medalist(s)
Frédérick Bousquet	50 m freestyle	22.11	15 Q	21.62	5 Q	21.93	8
Frédérick Bousquet	50 m butterfly	23.49	12 Q	22.93	4 Q	23.11	3rd place, bronze medalist(s)
Jordan Coelho	200 m butterfly	1:57.19	13 Q	1:57.12	15	did not advance	
Fabien Gilot	100 m freestyle	49.07	14 Q	48.21	6 Q	48.33	7
Damien Joly	400 m freestyle	3:57.32	32	—		did not advance	
Damien Joly	800 m freestyle	7:57.79	17	—		did not advance	
Camille Lacourt	50 m backstroke	24.97	7 Q	24.39	1 Q	24.42	1st place, gold medalist(s)
Camille Lacourt	100 m backstroke	54.20	=10 Q	53.42	5 Q	53.51	5
Grégory Mallet	200 m freestyle	1:49.10	26	did not advance			
Florent Manaudou	50 m freestyle	21.72	1 Q	21.37	1 Q	21.64	5
Florent Manaudou	50 m butterfly	23.18	3 Q	23.15	7 Q	23.35	8
Mehdy Metella	100 m butterfly	53.77	30	did not advance			
William Meynard	100 m freestyle	49.59	19	did not advance			
Giacomo Perez d'Ortona	50 m breaststroke	27.78	=22	did not advance			
Giacomo Perez d'Ortona	100 m breaststroke	1:00.55	19	did not advance			
Jérémy Stravius	50 m backstroke	24.79	3 Q	24.45	2 Q	24.54	2nd place, silver medalist(s)
Jérémy Stravius	100 m backstroke	53.85	5 Q	53.23	3 Q	53.21	3rd place, bronze medalist(s)
Jérémy Stravius	200 m individual medley	2:00.00	17	did not advance			
Enzo Vial-Collet	1500 m freestyle	15:23.92	23	—		did not advance	
Yannick Agnel; Fabien Gilot; Amaury Leveaux*; Grégory Mallet*; Florent Manaudou; William Meynard*; Jérémy Stravius	4 × 100 m freestyle relay	3:14.01	4 Q	—		3:11.18	1st place, gold medalist(s)
Yannick Agnel; Lorys Bourelly; Grégory Mallet; Jérémy Stravius	4 × 200 m freestyle relay	7:10.66	4 Q	—		7:04.91	4
Fabien Gilot; Camille Lacourt; Giacomo Perez d'Ortona; Jérémy Stravius	4 × 100 m medley relay	3:34.04	4 Q	—		3:31.51	1st place, gold medalist(s)

Women

Athlete	Event	Heat		Semifinal		Final	
Athlete	Event	Time	Rank	Time	Rank	Time	Rank
Coralie Balmy	400 m freestyle	4:10.70	14	—		did not advance	
Charlotte Bonnet	100 m freestyle	55.15	18	did not advance			
Charlotte Bonnet	200 m freestyle	1:56.82	4 Q	1:56.63	7 Q	1:57.56	8
Cloé Credeville	100 m backstroke	1:00.70	11 Q	1:01.16	14	did not advance	
Sophie de Ronchi	200 m individual medley	2:14.57	18	did not advance			
Mélanie Henique	50 m butterfly	26.54	=16* Q	25.95	4 Q	25.96	6
Camille Muffat	100 m freestyle	54.84	13 Q	Withdrew			
Camille Muffat	200 m freestyle	1:56.53	1 Q	1:56.28	4 Q	1:55.72	3rd place, bronze medalist(s)
Camille Muffat	400 m freestyle	4:05.53	5 Q	—		4:07.67	7
Sarah Vaisse	50 m breaststroke	32.74	40	did not advance			
Marie Wattel	50 m butterfly	27.77	38	did not advance			
Coralie Balmy; Charlotte Bonnet; Mylène Lazare; Isabelle Mabboux*; Camille Muffat	4 × 200 m freestyle relay	7:56.38	5 Q	—		7:48.43	3rd place, bronze medalist(s)
Coralie Balmy; Cloé Credeville; Sophie de Ronchi; Mélanie Henique	4 × 100 m medley relay	DSQ		—		did not advance	

== Synchronized swimming ==
France qualified 12 quota places for each of the following synchronized swimming events.

Athlete	Event	Preliminaries		Final	
Athlete	Event	Points	Rank	Points	Rank
Estel-Anaïs Hubaud	Solo free routine	84.960	10 Q	84.080	11
Laura Augé; Margaux Chrétien	Duet free routine	87.280	10 Q	86.620	10
Marie Annequin; Laura Augé; Léa Catania; Maëva Charbonnier; Iphinoé Davvetas*; May Jouvenez; Chloé Kautzmann; Lauriane Pontat; Lisa Richaud	Team free routine	86.510	7 Q	87.080	7
Marie Annequin; Laura Augé; Léa Catania; Maëva Charbonnier; Iphinoé Davvetas*; May Jouvenez; Chloé Kautzmann; Lauriane Pontat; Lisa Richaud	Team technical routine	87.100	7 Q	87.200	7
Marie Annequin; Léa Catania*; Maëva Charbonnier; Margaux Chrétien; Iphinoé Davvetas; Estel-Anaïs Hubaud*; May Jouvenez; Chloé Kautzmann; Lauriane Pontat; Lisa Richaud; Chloé Willhelm	Free routine combination	87.080	8 Q	86.820	8
