= France at the 2015 World Aquatics Championships =

- Flag of France
- World Aquatics code: FRA
- National federation: Fédération Française de Natation
- Website: www.ffnatation.fr

in Kazan, Russia
- Competitors: 63 in 5 sports
- Medals Ranked 6th: Gold 5 Silver 1 Bronze 1 Total 7

World Aquatics Championships appearances
- 1973; 1975; 1978; 1982; 1986; 1991; 1994; 1998; 2001; 2003; 2005; 2007; 2009; 2011; 2013; 2015; 2017; 2019; 2022; 2023; 2024; 2025

France competed at the 2015 World Aquatics Championships in Kazan, Russia, from 24 July to 9 August 2015.

== Medalists ==
| Medal | Name | Sport | Event | Date |
|---|---|---|---|---|
| Gold | Aurélie Muller | Open water swimming | Women's 10 km | July 28 |
| Gold | Fabien Gilot; Florent Manaudou; Mehdy Metella; Clément Mignon*; Jérémy Stravius | Swimming | Men's 4 × 100 m freestyle relay | August 2 |
| Gold | Florent Manaudou | Swimming | Men's 50 m butterfly | August 3 |
| Gold | Florent Manaudou | Swimming | Men's 50 m freestyle | August 8 |
| Gold | Camille Lacourt | Swimming | Men's 50 m backstroke | August 9 |
| Silver | Camille Lacourt | Swimming | Men's 100 m backstroke | August 4 |
| Bronze | Fabien Gilot; Camille Lacourt; Mehdy Metella; Giacomo Perez d'Ortona | Swimming | Men's 4 × 100 m medley relay | August 9 |

== Diving ==
French divers qualified for the individual spots and the synchronized teams at the World Championships.

Men

| Athlete | Event | Preliminaries | | Semifinals | | Final | |
| Athlete | Event | Points | Rank | Points | Rank | Points | Rank |
|---|---|---|---|---|---|---|---|
| Matthieu Rosset | 1 m springboard | 369.15 | 10 Q | —N/a | | 392.65 | 10 |
| Matthieu Rosset | 3 m springboard | 423.85 | 12 Q | 488.25 | 6 Q | 460.55 | 10 |
| Benjamin Auffret | 10 m platform | 463.60 | 10 Q | 461.35 | 11 Q | 490.25 | 5 |
| Alexis Jandard | 10 m platform | 322.20 | 39 | Did not advance | | | |

Women

| Athlete | Event | Preliminaries | | Semifinals | | Final | |
| Athlete | Event | Points | Rank | Points | Rank | Points | Rank |
|---|---|---|---|---|---|---|---|
| Laura Marino | 10 m platform | 332.80 | 8 Q | 349.50 | 4 Q | 331.20 | 9 |

Mixed

| Athlete | Event | Final | |
| Athlete | Event | Points | Rank |
|---|---|---|---|
| Benjamin Auffre; Laura Marino | 10 m synchronized platform | 295.35 | 7 |
| Matthieu Rosset; Laura Marino | Team | 417.20 | 5 |

== High diving ==
France has qualified one high diver at the World Championships.

| Athlete | Event | Points | Rank |
|---|---|---|---|
| Cyrille Oumedjkane | Men's high diving | 317.5 | 18 |

== Open water swimming ==
France fielded a full team of five swimmers to compete in the open water marathon.

| Athlete | Event | Time | Rank |
|---|---|---|---|
| David Aubry | Men's 5 km | 55:28.5 | 17 |
| Marc-Antoine Olivier | Men's 10 km | 1:50:06.4 | 6 |
| Marc-Antoine Olivier | Men's 25 km | Did not finish | |
| Axel Reymond | Men's 5 km | 55:31.8 | 22 |
| Axel Reymond | Men's 10 km | 1:50:28.4 | 12 |
| Axel Reymond | Men's 25 km | 4:55:55.8 | 4 |
| Coralie Codeville | Women's 10 km | 1:58:53.8 | 16 |
| Aurélie Muller | Women's 10 km | 1:58:04.3 | 1st place, gold medalist(s) |
| Aurélie Muller | Women's 25 km | 5:16:07.5 | 4 |
| David Aubry; Aurélie Muller; Marc-Antoine Olivier | Mixed team | 56:50.9 | 11 |

== Swimming ==
French swimmers have achieved qualifying standards in the following events (up to a maximum of 2 swimmers in each event at the A-standard entry time, and 1 at the B-standard): Swimmers must qualify at the 2015 French Championships in Limoges (for pool events) to confirm their places for the Worlds.

The French team consists of 28 swimmers (14 men and 14 women). Among the official roster featured defending World champion Camille Lacourt in the 50 m backstroke and 2012 Olympic champion Florent Manaudou in the 50 m freestyle. Reigning Olympic and World gold medalist Yannick Agnel was initially selected to the team, but had elected to withdraw from the Championships due to health issues, missing out an opportunity to successfully defend his 200 m freestyle title.

Men

| Athlete | Event | Heat | | Semifinal | | Final | |
| Athlete | Event | Time | Rank | Time | Rank | Time | Rank |
|---|---|---|---|---|---|---|---|
| Joris Bouchat | 800 m freestyle | 7:52.37 | 14 | —N/a | | Did not advance | |
| Thomas Dahlia | 200 m breaststroke | 2:12.64 | 22 | Did not advance | | | |
| Fabien Gilot | 100 m freestyle | 48.73 | 10 Q | 48.56 | 11 | Did not advance | |
| Damien Joly | 400 m freestyle | 3:50.89 | =24 | —N/a | | Did not advance | |
| Damien Joly | 800 m freestyle | 7:50.30 | 11 | —N/a | | Did not advance | |
| Damien Joly | 1500 m freestyle | 14:58.79 | 10 | —N/a | | Did not advance | |
| Camille Lacourt | 50 m backstroke | 24.56 | 1 Q | 24.27 | 1 Q | 24.23 | 1st place, gold medalist(s) |
| Camille Lacourt | 100 m backstroke | 53.92 | =12 Q | 52.70 | 2 Q | 52.48 | 2nd place, silver medalist(s) |
| Grégory Mallet | 200 m freestyle | 1:48.77 | 30 | Did not advance | | | |
| Florent Manaudou | 50 m freestyle | 21.71 | 1 Q | 21.41 | 2 Q | 21.19 | 1st place, gold medalist(s) |
| Florent Manaudou | 50 m butterfly | 23.15 | 1 Q | 22.84 NR | 1 Q | 22.97 | 1st place, gold medalist(s) |
| Mehdy Metella | 100 m butterfly | 52.07 | 13 Q | 51.39 | 6 Q | 51.24 | 5 |
| Clément Mignon | 50 m freestyle | 22.50 | 19 | Did not advance | | | |
| Clément Mignon | 200 m freestyle | DSQ | | Did not advance | | | |
| Giacomo Perez d'Ortona | 50 m breaststroke | 27.42 | 10 Q | 27.51 | 14 | Did not advance | |
| Giacomo Perez d'Ortona | 100 m breaststroke | 1:00.80 | 24 | Did not advance | | | |
| Benjamin Stasiulis | 200 m backstroke | 1:59.05 | 20 | Did not advance | | | |
| Jérémy Stravius | 100 m freestyle | 48.52 | 5 Q | 48.65 | 13 | Did not advance | |
| Jérémy Stravius | 50 m backstroke | 24.95 | 7 Q | 24.94 | 9 Q | Did not advance | |
| Jérémy Stravius | 100 m backstroke | 53.92 | =12 Q | 54.54 | 16 | Did not advance | |
| Mehdy Metella; Florent Manaudou; Fabien Gilot; Jérémy Stravius; Lorys Bourelly*; Clément Mignon* | 4 × 100 m freestyle relay | 3:14.53 | 4 Q | —N/a | | 3:10.74 | 1st place, gold medalist(s) |
| Jordan Pothain; Grégory Mallet; Lorys Bourelly; Clément Mignon | 4 × 200 m freestyle relay | 7:12.68 | 11 | —N/a | | Did not advance | |
| Fabien Gilot; Camille Lacourt; Mehdy Metella; Giacomo Perez d'Ortona | 4 × 100 m medley relay | 3:32.51 | 3 Q | —N/a | | 3:30.50 | 3rd place, bronze medalist(s) |

Women

| Athlete | Event | Heat | | Semifinal | | Final | |
| Athlete | Event | Time | Rank | Time | Rank | Time | Rank |
|---|---|---|---|---|---|---|---|
| Coralie Balmy | 200 m freestyle | 1:59.70 | 23 | Did not advance | | | |
| Coralie Balmy | 400 m freestyle | 4:09.68 | 16 | —N/a | | Did not advance | |
| Coralie Balmy | 800 m freestyle | DNS | | —N/a | | Did not advance | |
| Charlotte Bonnet | 100 m freestyle | 54.01 | 8 Q | 54.15 | 10 | Did not advance | |
| Charlotte Bonnet | 200 m freestyle | 1:57.99 | 8 Q | 1:57.01 | 9 | Did not advance | |
| Mathilde Cini | 50 m backstroke | 28.46 | 15 Q | 28.16 | 10 | Did not advance | |
| Mathilde Cini | 100 m backstroke | 1:01.77 | 33 | Did not advance | | | |
| Fanny Deberghes | 100 m breaststroke | 1:10.70 | =39 | Did not advance | | | |
| Béryl Gastaldello | 100 m freestyle | 55.11 | 21 | Did not advance | | | |
| Béryl Gastaldello | 50 m backstroke | 28.02 | =7 Q | 28.30 | 13 | Did not advance | |
| Béryl Gastaldello | 100 m backstroke | 1:01.91 | 34 | Did not advance | | | |
| Béryl Gastaldello | 50 m butterfly | 26.46 | =14 Q | 26.25 | 14 | Did not advance | |
| Béryl Gastaldello | 100 m butterfly | 59.06 | 24 | Did not advance | | | |
| Lara Grangeon | 200 m butterfly | 2:08.54 | 8 Q | 2:08.67 | 11 | Did not advance | |
| Lara Grangeon | 200 m individual medley | 2:13.50 | 18 | Did not advance | | | |
| Lara Grangeon | 400 m individual medley | 4:38.20 | 8 Q | —N/a | | 4:40.98 | 8 |
| Mélanie Henique | 50 m butterfly | 26.33 | =12 Q | 26.03 | 10 | Did not advance | |
| Fantine Lesaffre | 400 m individual medley | 4:46.06 | 23 | —N/a | | Did not advance | |
| Anna Santamans | 50 m freestyle | 24.90 | 10 Q | 24.93 | =13 | Did not advance | |
| Marie Wattel | 100 m butterfly | 58.84 | 21 | Did not advance | | | |
| Charlotte Bonnet; Béryl Gastaldello; Cloé Hache; Anna Santamans | 4 × 100 m freestyle relay | 3:38.35 | 8 Q | —N/a | | 3:38.46 | 8 |
| Charlotte Bonnet; Coralie Balmy; Cloé Hache; Margaux Fabre; Ophélie-Cyrielle Étienne* | 4 × 200 m freestyle relay | 7:55.08 | 8 Q | —N/a | | 7.55.98 | 8 |
| Charlotte Bonnet; Béryl Gastaldello; Anna Santamans; Marie Wattel | 4 × 100 m medley relay | 4:02.13 | 12 | —N/a | | Did not advance | |

Mixed

| Athlete | Event | Heat | | Final | |
| Athlete | Event | Time | Rank | Time | Rank |
|---|---|---|---|---|---|
| Lorys Bourelly; Clément Mignon; Cloé Hache; Margaux Fabre | 4 × 100 m freestyle relay | 3:28.29 | 9 | Did not advance | |
| Benjamin Stasiulis; Giacomo Perez-Dortona; Marie Wattel; Anna Santamans | 4 × 100 m medley relay | DSQ | | Did not advance | |

== Synchronized swimming ==
France fielded a full team of eleven synchronized swimmers to compete in each of the following events.

Women

| Athlete | Event | Preliminaries | | Final | |
| Athlete | Event | Points | Rank | Points | Rank |
|---|---|---|---|---|---|
| Estel-Anaïs Hubaud | Solo technical routine | 82.6548 | 11 Q | 83.0030 | 12 |
| Margaux Chrétien | Solo free routine | 85.6667 | 10 Q | 86.6000 | 8 |
| Laura Augé; Margaux Chrétien | Duet technical routine | 84.9664 | 8 Q | 84.7751 | 9 |
| Laura Augé; Margaux Chrétien | Duet free routine | 86.6667 | 8 Q | 87.3667 | 8 |
| Marie Annequin; Laura Augé; Morgan Beteille; Margaux Chrétien; Iphinoé Davvetas; Camille Guerre; Chloé Kautzmann; Lauriane Pontat | Team technical routine | 85.1487 | 8 Q | 85.1794 | 8 |
| Laura Augé; Morgan Beteille; Margaux Chrétien; Iphinoé Davvetas; Camille Guerre; Estel-Anaïs Hubaud; Chloé Kautzmann; Lauriane Pontat | Team free routine | 86.5667 | 9 Q | 87.3333 | 9 |

Mixed

| Athlete | Event | Preliminaries | | Final | |
| Athlete | Event | Points | Rank | Points | Rank |
|---|---|---|---|---|---|
| Benoît Beaufils; Virginie Dedieu | Duet free routine | 88.5333 | 3 Q | 88.5333 | 4 |

== Water polo ==
=== Women's tournament ===
Team roster

- Lorène Derenty
- Estelle Millot
- Léa Bachelier
- Aurore Sacré
- Louise Guillet
- Géraldine Mahieu
- Marie Barbieux
- Marion Tardy
- Lucie Cesca
- Sonia Bouloukbachi
- Yaëlle Deschampt
- Michaela Jaskova
- Morgane Chabrier

Group play

| Pos | Team | Pld | W | D | L | GF | GA | GD | Pts | Qualification |
|---|---|---|---|---|---|---|---|---|---|---|
| 1 | Russia | 3 | 2 | 1 | 0 | 38 | 25 | +13 | 5 | Advanced to quarterfinals |
| 2 | China | 3 | 2 | 1 | 0 | 31 | 21 | +10 | 5 | Advanced to playoffs |
| 3 | Hungary | 3 | 1 | 0 | 2 | 37 | 25 | +12 | 2 | Advanced to playoffs |
| 4 | France | 3 | 0 | 0 | 3 | 12 | 47 | −35 | 0 | |

Source: SportResult.com
Rules for classification: 1) points; 2) head-to-head points; 3) head-to-head goal difference; 4) head-to-head number of goals scored; 5) goal difference.

| 26 July 2015; 18:50 | Report | Russia | 16–5 | France | Kazan; Attendance: 2,164; Referees: Peter de Jong (NED), Stephane Roy (CAN) |
| 26 July 2015; 18:50 | Report | Score by quarters: 5–1, 3–2, 4–1, 4–1 | | | Kazan; Attendance: 2,164; Referees: Peter de Jong (NED), Stephane Roy (CAN) |
| 26 July 2015; 18:50 | Report | Karimova, Prokofyeva 3 | Goals | Guillet 3 | Kazan; Attendance: 2,164; Referees: Peter de Jong (NED), Stephane Roy (CAN) |

| 28 July 2015; 17:30 | Report | France | 4–13 | China | Kazan; Attendance: 1,700; Referees: Adrian Alexandrescu (ROU), Peter de Jong (NED) |
| 28 July 2015; 17:30 | Report | Score by quarters: 1–2, 1–0, 1–6, 1–5 | | | Kazan; Attendance: 1,700; Referees: Adrian Alexandrescu (ROU), Peter de Jong (NED) |
| 28 July 2015; 17:30 | Report | Guillet 2 | Goals | Niu Guannan 6 | Kazan; Attendance: 1,700; Referees: Adrian Alexandrescu (ROU), Peter de Jong (NED) |

| 30 July 2015; 12:10 | Report | Hungary | 18–3 | France | Kazan; Attendance: 372; Referees: German Moller (ARG), Stanko Ivanovski (MNE) |
| 30 July 2015; 12:10 | Report | Score by quarters: 5–1, 1–1, 7–0, 5–1 | | | Kazan; Attendance: 372; Referees: German Moller (ARG), Stanko Ivanovski (MNE) |
| 30 July 2015; 12:10 | Report | Bujka 6 | Goals | Guillet 2 | Kazan; Attendance: 372; Referees: German Moller (ARG), Stanko Ivanovski (MNE) |

13th–16th place semifinals

| 1 August 2015; 12:10 | Report | Japan | 6–9 | France | Kazan; Attendance: 1,969; Referees: Fabio Toffoli (BRA), Peter de Jong (NED) |
| 1 August 2015; 12:10 | Report | Score by quarters: 3–2, 1–4, 1–1, 1–2 | | | Kazan; Attendance: 1,969; Referees: Fabio Toffoli (BRA), Peter de Jong (NED) |
| 1 August 2015; 12:10 | Report | Nakano 2 | Goals | Guillet 5 | Kazan; Attendance: 1,969; Referees: Fabio Toffoli (BRA), Peter de Jong (NED) |

13th place game

| 3 August 2015; 10:50 | Report | New Zealand | 7–6 | France | Kazan; Attendance: 400; Referees: Dion Willis (RSA), Stephane Roy (CAN) |
| 3 August 2015; 10:50 | Report | Score by quarters: 1–2, 3–2, 1–2, 2–0 | | | Kazan; Attendance: 400; Referees: Dion Willis (RSA), Stephane Roy (CAN) |
| 3 August 2015; 10:50 | Report | Myles 2 | Goals | Millot, Tardy 2 | Kazan; Attendance: 400; Referees: Dion Willis (RSA), Stephane Roy (CAN) |
