= Léa Catania =

French synchronized swimmer

Personal information
- Nationality: French
- Born: 8 August 1993 (age 32) Aix-en-Provence
- Height: 160 cm (5 ft 3 in) (2013)
- Weight: 47 kg (104 lb) (2013)

Sport
- Country: France
- Sport: Synchronized swimming
- Event(s): Duo, Team, Combination
- Club: Pays d'Aix Natation

Achievements and titles
- World finals: 2013 World Aquatics Championships

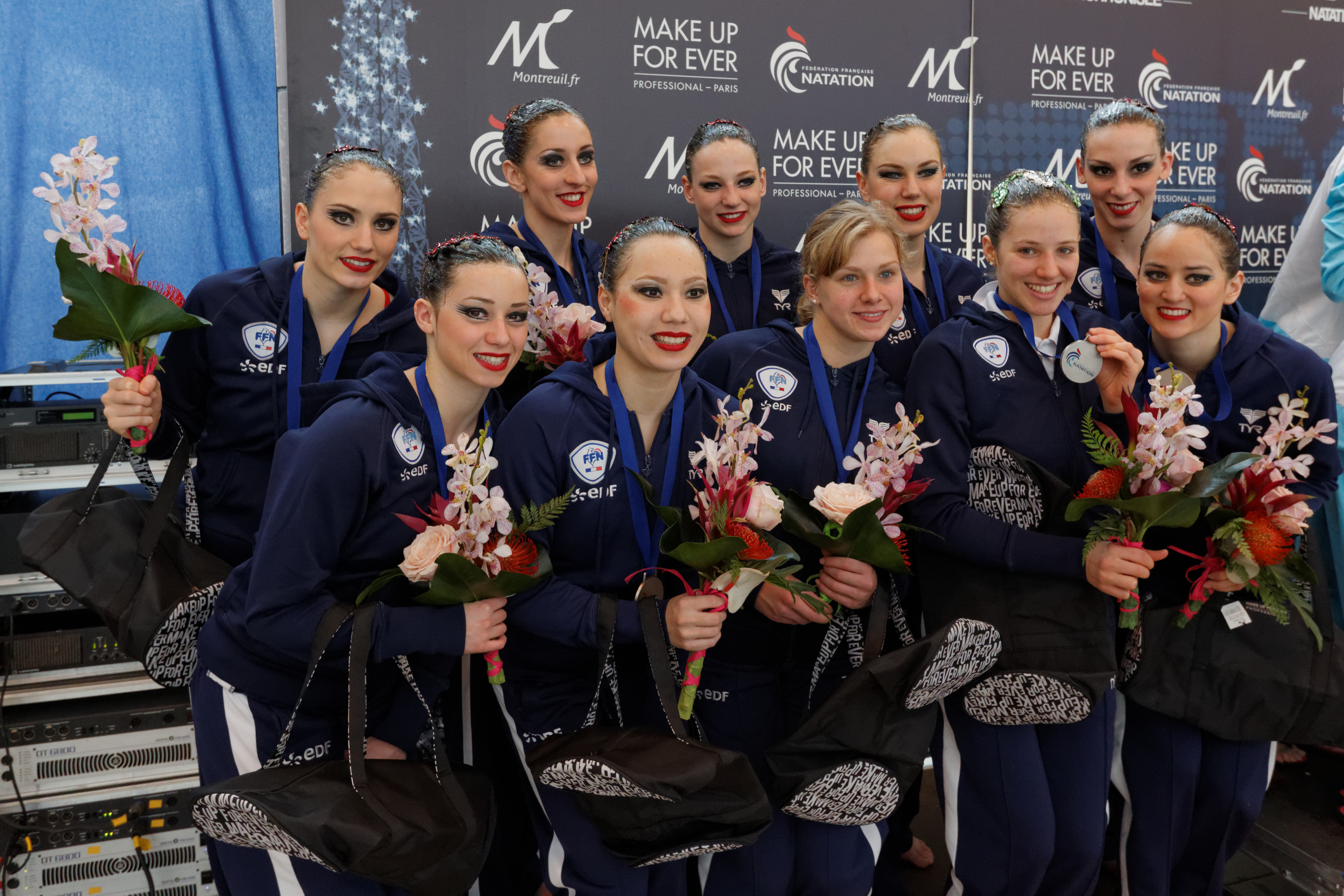
French team at the 2013 French Open. Top: Maëva Charbonnier, Laura Augé, May Jouvenez, Margaux Chrétien, Marie Annequin. Bottom: Léa Catania, Chloé Kautzmann, Lisa Richaud, Iphinoé Davvetas, Lauriane Pontat.

Léa Catania (born 8 August 1993) is a French competitor in synchronized swimming who competed in the 2013 World Aquatics Championships.

== Personal ==
Catania was born on 8 August 1993 in Aix-en-Provence. She attended the famous theatre school Cours Simon. Catania is 160 centimetres (5 ft 3 in) tall and weighs 47 kilograms (100 lb).

== Synchronized swimming ==
Catania is a synchronized swimmer, starting in the sport when she was eight years old in the team of Pays d'Aix Natation.

In 2012, she won with Iphinoé Davvetas the title of national champion of France in the duet event.

Catania represented France at the 2013 World Aquatics Championships in the team event. Her team finished 7th both in the technical routine and free routine.
