= Iphinoé Davvetas =

French synchronized swimmer

Personal information
- Born: 6 August 1992 (age 33) Greece
- Height: 168 cm (5 ft 6 in) (2013)
- Weight: 59 kg (130 lb) (2013)

Sport
- Country: France
- Sport: Synchronized swimming
- Event(s): Duo, Team, Combination
- Club: Stade Français

Achievements and titles
- World finals: 2013 World Aquatics Championships

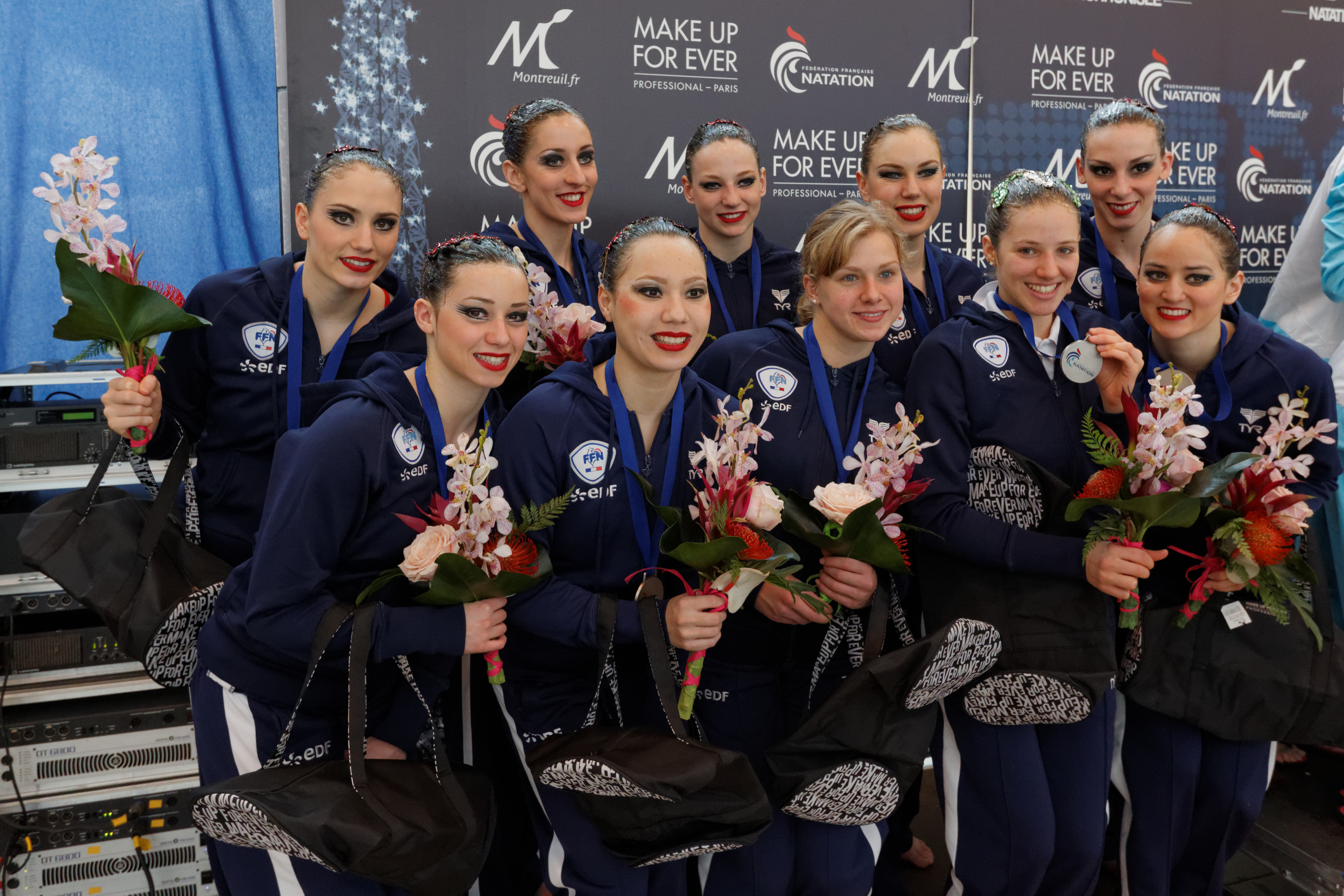
French team at the 2013 French Open. Top: Maëva Charbonnier, Laura Augé, May Jouvenez, Margaux Chrétien, Marie Annequin. Bottom: Léa Catania, Chloé Kautzmann, Lisa Richaud, Iphinoé Davvetas, Lauriane Pontat.

Iphinoé Davvetas (born 6 August 1992) is a French competitor in synchronized swimming who competed in the 2013 World Aquatics Championships.

== Personal ==
Davvetas was born on 6 August 1992 in Greece. She moved to France in 2011 where she studies International relations at Pantheon-Sorbonne University. Davvetas is 168 centimetres (5 ft 6 in) tall and weighs 58 kilograms (130 lb).

== Synchronized swimming ==
Davvetas is a synchronized swimmer, starting in the sport when she was eleven years old in the team of Athens.

Between 2005 and 2010, she won 4 titles of national champion of Greece. In 2012, she won with Léa Catania the title of national champion of France in the duet event.

Davvetas represented France at the 2013 World Aquatics Championships in the combination event. Her team finished 8th scoring 43,380 in the technical merit, 43,440 in the artistic impression.
