= Maëva Charbonnier =

French synchronized swimmer

Personal information
- Nationality: French
- Born: 26 December 1991 (age 34) Vichy
- Height: 170 cm (5 ft 7 in) (2013)
- Weight: 62 kg (137 lb) (2013)

Sport
- Country: France
- Sport: Synchronized swimming
- Event(s): Team, Combination
- Club: Aqua Synchro Lyon

Achievements and titles
- World finals: 2011, 2013 World Aquatics Championships

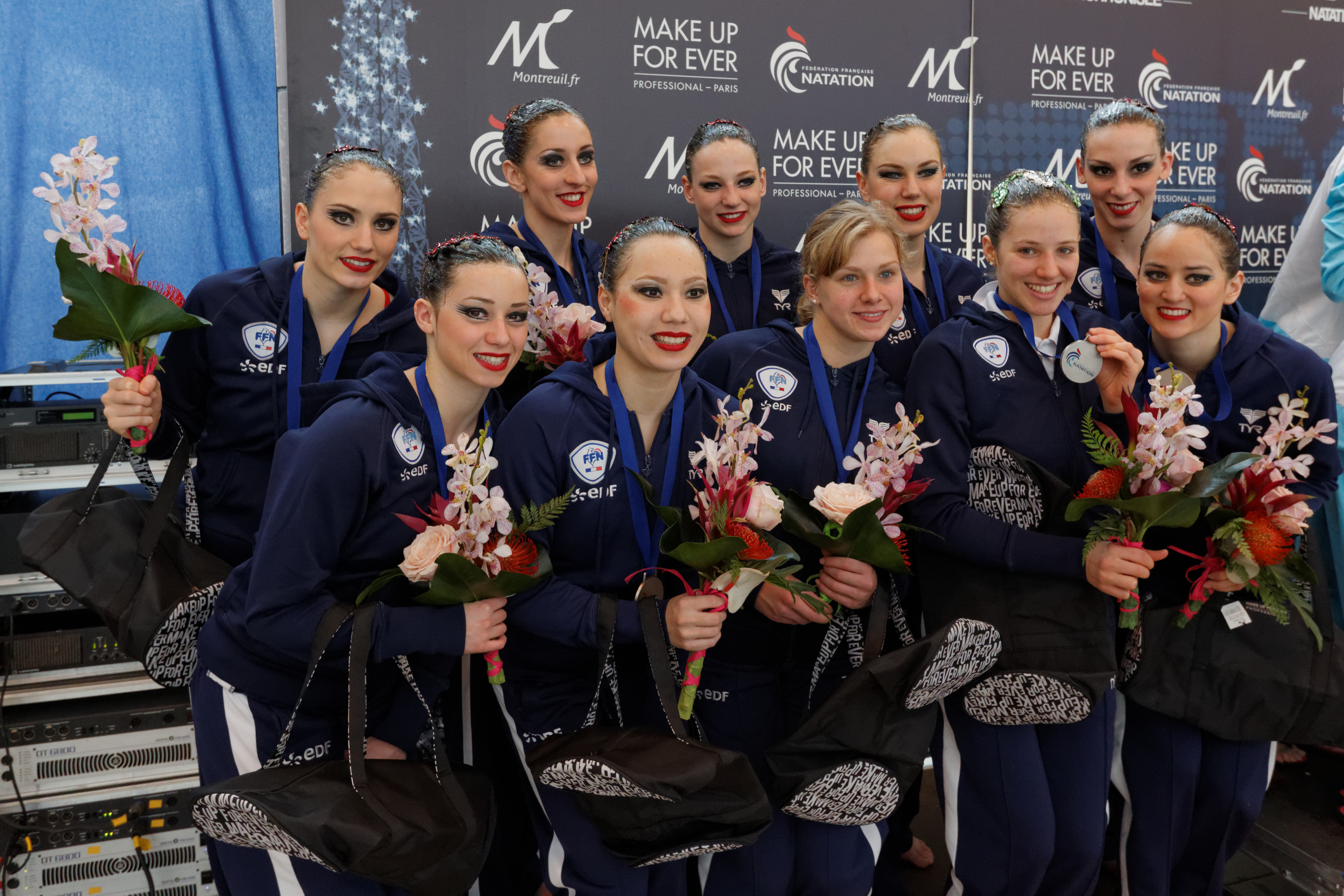
French team at the 2013 French Open. Top: Maëva Charbonnier, Laura Augé, May Jouvenez, Margaux Chrétien, Marie Annequin. Bottom: Léa Catania, Chloé Kautzmann, Lisa Richaud, Iphinoé Davvetas, Lauriane Pontat.

Maëva Charbonnier (born 26 December 1991) is a French competitor in synchronized swimming who competed in the 2011 and 2013 World Aquatics Championships.

== Personal ==
Charbonnier was born on 26 December 1991 in Vichy. She studies physical therapy. Charbonnier is 170 centimetres (5 ft 7 in) tall and weighs 62 kilograms (140 lb).

== Synchronized swimming ==
Charbonnier is a synchronized swimmer, starting in the sport when she was nine years old in the team of Synchro Riom.

Charbonnier represented France in team events. She finished 5th at the 2010 European Aquatics Championships, 8th at the 2011 World Aquatics Championships, 4th at the 2012 European Aquatics Championships and 7th at the 2013 World Aquatics Championships, both in the technical routine and free routine.

She's also a member of the French team during combination events. At the 2013 World Aquatics Championships, the team finished 8th scoring 43,380 in the technical merit, 43,440 in the artistic impression.
