= Lauriane Pontat =

French synchronized swimmer

Personal information
- Nationality: French
- Born: 13 October 1992 (age 33) La Seyne-sur-Mer
- Height: 168 cm (5 ft 6 in) (2013)
- Weight: 52 kg (115 lb) (2013)

Sport
- Country: France
- Sport: Synchronized swimming
- Event(s): Solo, Duet, Team, Combination
- Club: Hyères Natation Synchronisée

Achievements and titles
- World finals: 2013 World Aquatics Championships

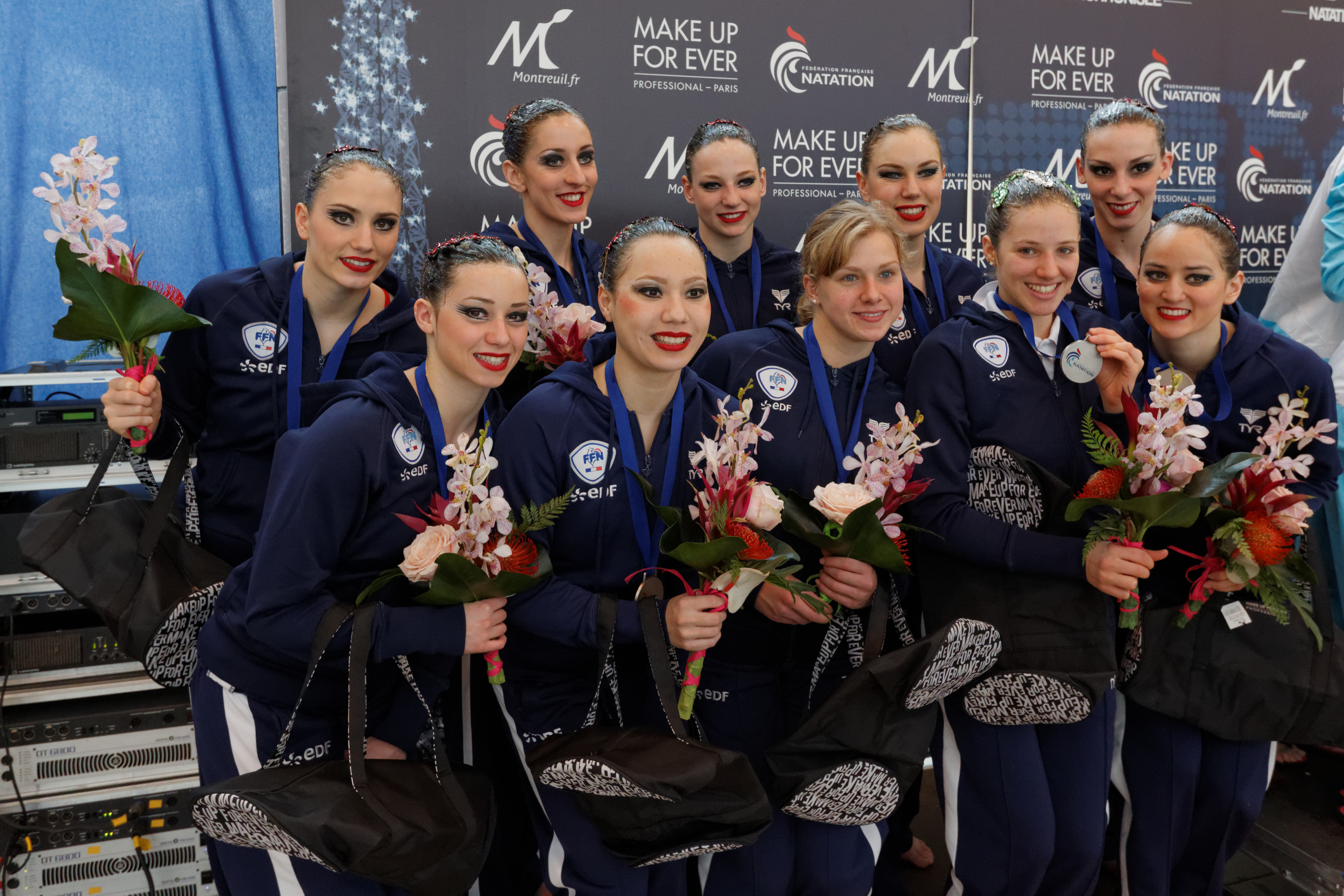
French team at the 2013 French Open. Top: Maëva Charbonnier, Laura Augé, May Jouvenez, Margaux Chrétien, Marie Annequin. Bottom: Léa Catania, Chloé Kautzmann, Lisa Richaud, Iphinoé Davvetas, Lauriane Pontat.

Lauriane Pontat (born 13 October 1992) is a French competitor in synchronized swimming who competed in the 2013 World Aquatics Championships.

== Personal ==
Pontat was born on 13 October 1992 in La Seyne-sur-Mer. She is studying sport and exercise science. Pontat is 168 centimetres (5 ft 6 in) tall and weighs 52 kilograms (110 lb).

== Synchronized swimming ==
Pontat is a synchronized swimmer, starting in the sport when she was seven years old in the team of Hyères Natation Synchronisée.

Pontat was part of the French Synchronised Swimming Team that swam at Barcelona 2013. She finished 7th in the team free routine, in the team technical routine and 8th in the free routine combination.

== Career records ==
Solo
2011, France National Championships, 2nd

Duet
2011, France National Championships, 1st (with Sophie Prach)

Team
2010, Junior European Championships, Tampere, 6th
2010, Junior World Championships, Indianapolis, 9th
2013, World Championships, Barcelona, 7th

Combination
2011, France National Championships, 1st
2013, World Championships, Barcelona, 8th
