= Camille Guerre =

French synchronized swimmer (born 1996)

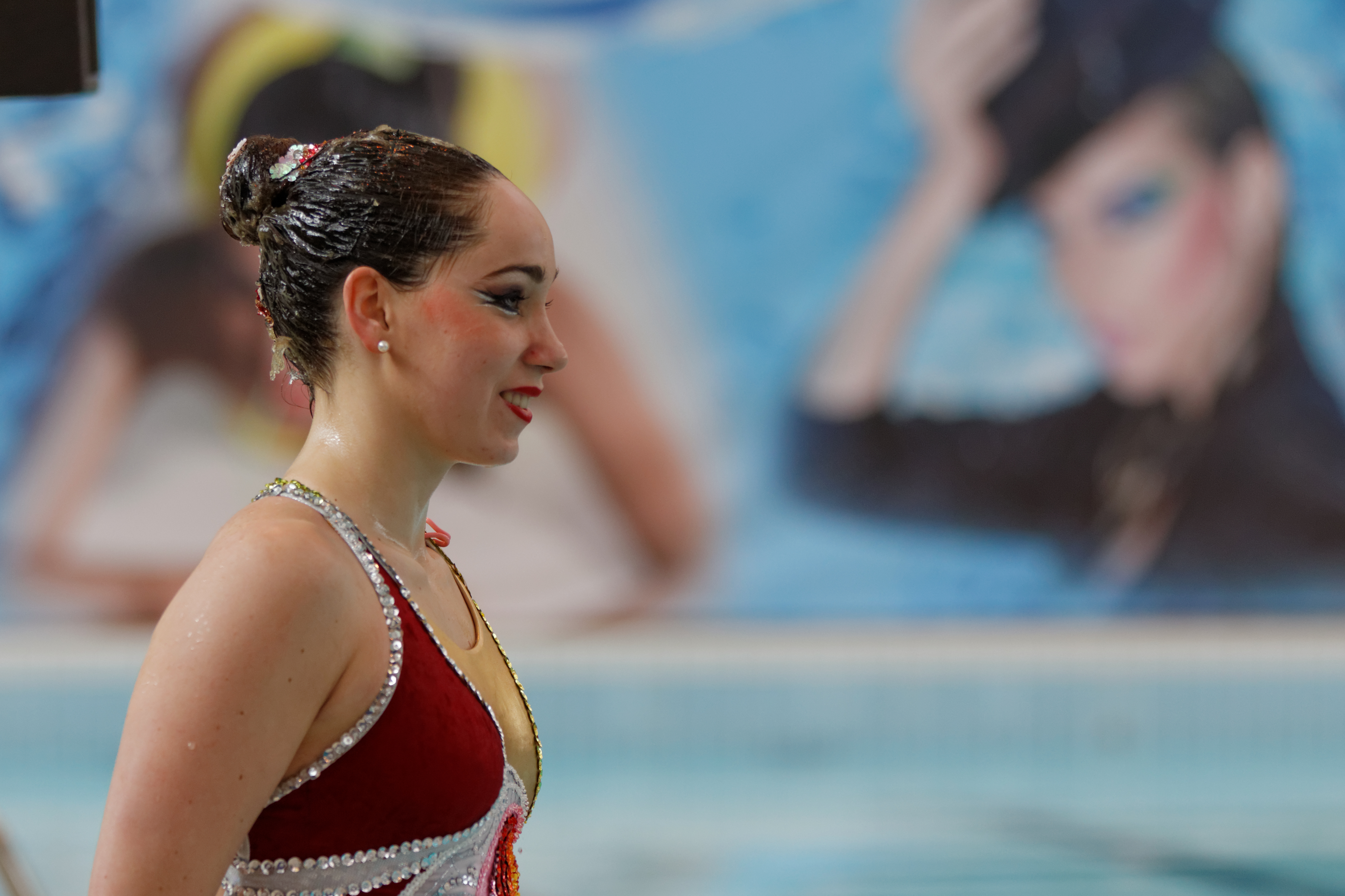
- Camille Guerre in March 2013

Personal information
- Nationality: French
- Born: 27 October 1996 (age 29) Sèvres, France
- Height: 170 cm (5 ft 7 in) (2014)
- Weight: 62 kg (137 lb) (2014)

Sport
- Country: France
- Sport: Synchronized swimming
- Event(s): Solo, Duet, Team, Combination
- Club: Pays d'Aix Natation
- Coached by: Myriam Lignot, Ana Tarrés, Magali Rathier, Charlotte Massardier, Julie Fabre

Achievements and titles
- World finals: 2014 FINA World Junior Synchronised Swimming Championships

Camille Guerre (born 27 October 1996) is a French synchronized swimmer who competed in the 2014 FINA World Junior Synchronised Swimming Championships.

== Personal life ==
Camille Guerre was born on 27 October 1996 in Sèvres.

In 2014, she passed the scientific baccalauréat with summa cum laude distinction.

She benefits from the high level athletes program sponsored by the Minister of Youth Affairs and Sports (France).

As of September 2014, she was a bachelor in science student in mathematics at UPMC.

== Career ==
Camille Guerre is a synchronized swimmer.

In 2011, Guerre was awarded as athletes of the year by the municipality of Aix en Provence

== Career records ==
=== Solo ===
2013, Junior France National Championships, 3rd

2013, Open make up for ever, 8th

2014, Junior France National Championships, 2nd

2014, Open make up for ever, 7th

=== Duet ===
2013, Junior France National Championships, 1st
2013, Junior European Championships, Poznań, 4th (with Estel-Anaïs Hubaud)
2014, Open make up for ever, 12th

=== Team ===
2012, Junior World Championships, Volos, 10th (with Morgane Beteille, Maureen Dos Santos, Estel-Anaïs Hubaud, May Jouvenez, Lisa Richaud, Laurie Savary, Fanny Soulard)
2013, Junior France National Championships, 1st
2013, Junior European Championships, Poznań, 6th (with Morgane Beteille, Alice Boucher, Maureen Dos Santos, Estel-Anaïs Hubaud, Louise Pastres, Estelle Philibert, Fanny Soulard)
