= Swimming at the 2010 South American Games – Men's 50 metre breaststroke =

The Men's 50m breaststroke event at the 2010 South American Games was held on March 27, with the heats at 10:07 and the Final at 18:0.

== Medalists ==
Gold	Silver	Bronze
Felipe França Silva; Brazil	João Gomes Jr. Brazil	Martin Melconian; Uruguay

== Records ==
Standing records prior to the 2010 South American Games
World record	Cameron van der Burgh (RSA)	26.67	Rome, Italy	29 July 2009
Competition Record	Eduardo Fischer (BRA)	28.69	Buenos Aires, Argentina	16 November 2006
South American record	Felipe França Silva (BRA)	26.76	Rome, Italy	29 July 2009

== Results ==
=== Heats ===
Rank	Heat	Lane	Athlete	Result	Notes
1	1	4	João Gomes Jr. (BRA)	28.21	Q
2	2	4	Felipe França Silva (BRA)	28.29	Q
3	1	3	Martin Melconian (URU)	28.91	Q
4	3	5	Genaro Britez (PAR)	29.02	Q
5	1	5	Lucas Eugenio Peralta (ARG)	29.19	Q
6	3	6	Renato Fernandez (PAR)	29.58	Q
7	2	5	Gonzalo Martin Acuna (ARG)	29.59	Q
7	3	3	Jorge Murillo (COL)	29.59	Q
9	2	3	Jefersson Llanos (COL)	29.75	
10	3	2	Alex Solorzano Castro (ECU)	29.77	
11	2	2	Ricardo Fuentes Salgado (CHI)	30.77	
12	1	2	Hycinth Cijntje (AHO)	30.80	
13	3	7	Jose Salazar Sierra (ECU)	30.94	
14	2	6	Pedro Luna Llamosas (PER)	31.50	
15	1	6	Erick Arturo Medina (PAN)	31.55	
16	2	7	Diguan Pigot (SUR)	31.58	
17	3	1	Jordy Groters (ARU)	32.08	
18	1	7	Mario Sergio Chicot (PER)	33.28	
19	1	1	Fabian Binns (GUY)	34.08	
20	2	1	Armando Claure (BOL)	35.62	
	3	4	Ivan Enderica Ochoa (ECU)	DNS	

=== Final ===
Rank	Lane	Athlete	Result	Notes
1st place, gold medalist(s)	5	Felipe França Silva (BRA)	27.90	CR
2nd place, silver medalist(s)	4	João Gomes Jr. (BRA)	28.06	
3rd place, bronze medalist(s)	3	Martin Melconian (URU)	28.88	
4	2	Lucas Eugenio Peralta (ARG)	29.02	
5	6	Genaro Marias Britez (PAR)	29.13	
6	8	Jorge Murillo (COL)	29.49	
7	1	Gonzalo Martin Acuna (ARG)	29.59	
8	7	Renato David Fernandez (PAR)	29.71	
