= Chloé Kautzmann =

French synchronized swimmer

Personal information
- Nationality: French
- Born: 12 September 1991 (age 34) Strasbourg
- Height: 163 cm (5 ft 4 in) (2013)
- Weight: 53 kg (117 lb) (2013)

Sport
- Country: France
- Sport: Synchronized swimming
- Event(s): Team, Combination
- Club: Ballet Nautique Strasbourg

Achievements and titles
- World finals: 2013 World Aquatics Championships

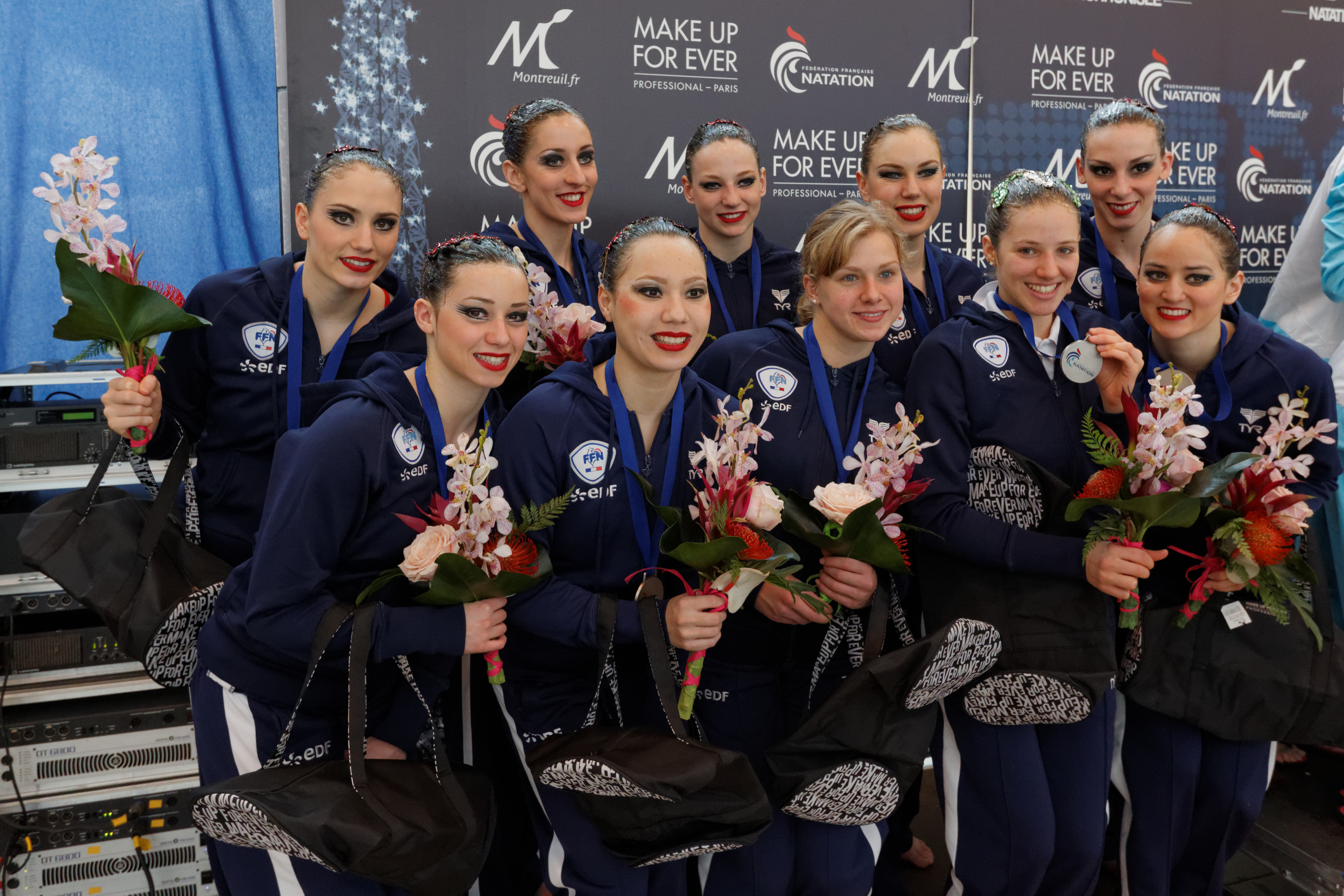
French team at the 2013 French Open. Top: Maëva Charbonnier, Laura Augé, May Jouvenez, Margaux Chrétien, Marie Annequin. Bottom: Léa Catania, Chloé Kautzmann, Lisa Richaud, Iphinoé Davvetas, Lauriane Pontat.

Chloé Kautzmann (born 12 September 1991) is a French competitor in synchronized swimming who competed in the 2011 and 2013 World Aquatics Championships.

== Personal ==
Kautzmann was born on 12 September 1991 in Strasbourg. She studies by correspondence Business and Administration (gestion des entreprises et des administrations). Kautzmann is 163 centimetres (5 ft 4 in) tall and weighs 53 kilograms (120 lb).

== Synchronized swimming ==
Kautzmann is a synchronized swimmer, starting in the sport when she was seven years old in the team of Strasbourg.

Kautzmann represented France in free routine combination events. She finished 5th at the 2010 European Aquatics Championships, 8th at the 2011 World Aquatics Championships, 4th at the 2012 European Aquatics Championships and 7th at the 2013 World Aquatics Championships, both in the technical routine and free routine. With Marie Annequin, she is captain of the French team.
