= Felipe França Silva =

Brazilian swimmer (born 1987)

Felipe França
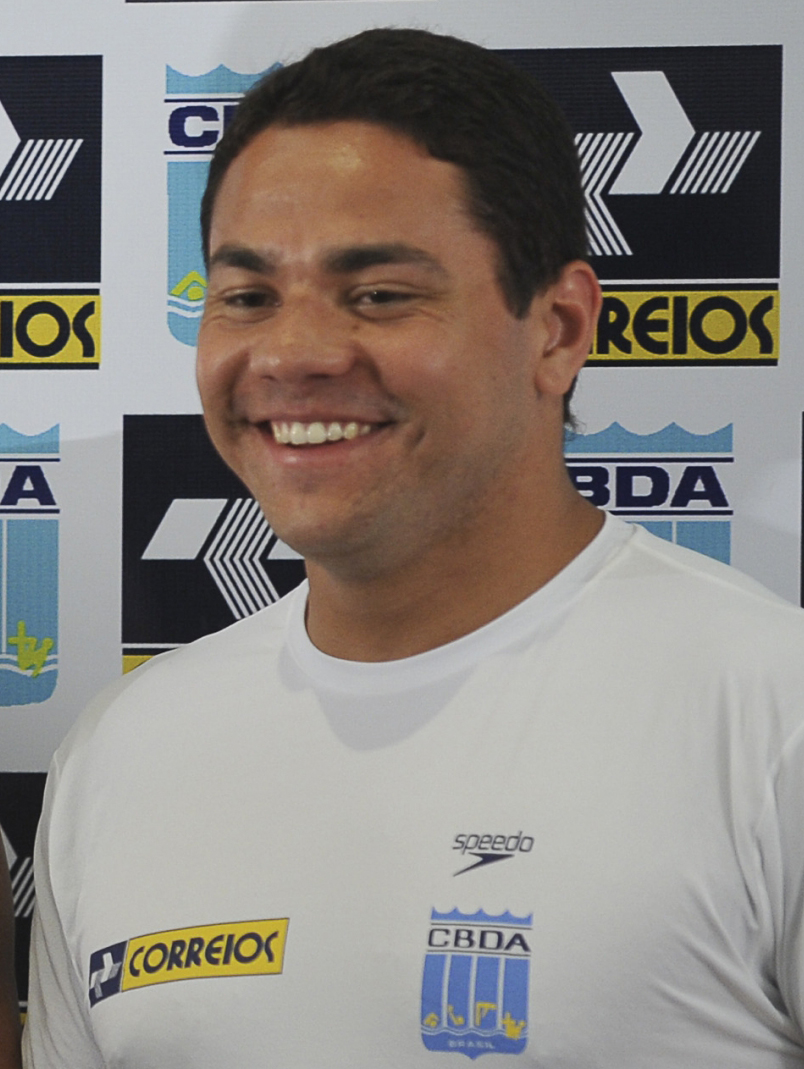

Personal information
- Full name: Felipe Alves França da Silva
- National team: Brazil
- Born: 14 May 1987 (age 39) Suzano, São Paulo, Brazil
- Height: 1.86 m (6 ft 1 in)
- Weight: 90 kg (198 lb)

Sport
- Sport: Swimming
- Strokes: Breaststroke
Medal record
Men's swimming
Representing Brazil
Event	1st	2nd	3rd
Olympic Games	0	0	0
World Championships (LC)	1	1	0
World Championships (SC)	6	0	2
Pan Pacific Championships	1	1	0
Pan American Games	4	0	0
Universiade	0	1	0
Total	12	3	2
World Championships (LC)
Gold medal – first place	2011 Shanghai	50 m breaststroke
Silver medal – second place	2009 Rome	50 m breaststroke
World Championships (SC)
Gold medal – first place	2010 Dubai	50 m breaststroke
Gold medal – first place	2014 Doha	50 m breaststroke
Gold medal – first place	2014 Doha	100 m breaststroke
Gold medal – first place	2014 Doha	4×50 m medley
Gold medal – first place	2014 Doha	4×100 m medley
Gold medal – first place	2014 Doha	4×50 m mixed medley
Bronze medal – third place	2010 Dubai	100 m breaststroke
Bronze medal – third place	2010 Dubai	4×100 m medley
Pan Pacific Championships
Gold medal – first place	2010 Irvine	50 m breaststroke
Silver medal – second place	2014 Gold Coast	100 m breaststroke
Pan American Games
Gold medal – first place	2011 Guadalajara	100 m breaststroke
Gold medal – first place	2011 Guadalajara	4×100 m medley
Gold medal – first place	2015 Toronto	100 m breaststroke
Gold medal – first place	2015 Toronto	4×100 m medley
South American Games
Gold medal – first place	2010 Medellín	50 m breaststroke
Gold medal – first place	2010 Medellín	100 m breaststroke
Gold medal – first place	2010 Medellín	4×100 m medley
Gold medal – first place	2022 Asunción	50 m breaststroke
Silver medal – second place	2006 Buenos Aires	100 m breaststroke
Bronze medal – third place	2006 Buenos Aires	50 m breaststroke
Bronze medal – third place	2022 Asunción	100 m breaststroke
Universiade
Silver medal – second place	2009 Belgrade	50 m breaststroke

Felipe Alves França da Silva (born 14 May 1987) is a Brazilian breaststroke swimmer, who competed for his country in three Olympic Games.

He started swimming at Esporte Clube União Suzano when he was just three years old. At age 13, he became the champion in Brazilian Juniors Category II. After training at the Gustavo Borges academy in Curitiba, França moved to the state capital, São Paulo, and joined Esporte Clube Pinheiros.

== International career ==
=== 2008 ===
In April 2008, França competed in the 2008 FINA World Swimming Championships (25 m), in the city of Manchester, placing 6th in the 4×100-metre medley, 12th in the 100-metre breaststroke, and 13th in the 50-metre breaststroke.

A month later, in May 2008, Felipe França captured the second Brazilian spot for the 2008 Summer Olympics in the 100-metre breaststroke, recording a time of 1:01.17 at the Brazilian Olympic trials. However, at the 2008 Olympics, he failed to move on from the early heats in his individual event. In the end, França finished 22nd in the 100-metre breaststroke and, along with his teammates, placed 14th in the 4×100-metre medley relay.

=== 2009 ===
At the 2009 Brazilian Championships (Maria Lenk Trophy), França became the first swimmer to record a time under 27 seconds in the long-course 50-metre breaststroke, winning the event with the World Record time of 26.89 seconds.

At the 2009 Summer Universiade in Belgrade, Serbia, França won the silver medal in the 50-metre breaststroke.

At the 2009 World Aquatics Championships in Rome, França again won the silver medal, recording a mark of 26.76 seconds, which became the new Americas record. The gold went to South African Cameron van der Burgh, who became the new world record holder with a time of 26.67 seconds.

=== 2010 ===
At the 2010 Pan Pacific Swimming Championships in Irvine, California, França won gold in the 50-metre breaststroke.

In December, at the 2010 FINA World Swimming Championships (25 m) in Dubai, he again won gold in the 50-metre breaststroke, beating the world record holder Cameron van der Burgh with a time of 25.95 seconds, setting a new championship record. He also captured the bronze in the 100-metre breaststroke with a time of 57.39 seconds. Together with César Cielo, Guilherme Guido and Kaio Almeida, França set a new South American record in the 4×100-metre medley with a combined time of 3:23.12, which was also good enough for the bronze medal.

=== 2011 ===
In July 2011, during the 2011 World Aquatics Championships in Shanghai, França won the gold medal in the 50-metre breaststroke, again beating the world record holder, Cameron van der Burgh, with a time of 27.01 seconds.

At the 2011 Pan American Games, he won gold in the 100-metre breaststroke and in the 4×100-metre medley

=== 2012 ===
In April 2012, participating in the Maria Lenk Trophy in Rio de Janeiro, França recorded a time of 59.63 in the early heats. This assured him of a place on the Brazilian team at the London 2012 Olympics. In the 50-metre breaststroke, he recorded the fastest time in the world in 2012, with a 26.87 seconds showing, just a tenth of a second off his career best.

The Brazilian team had high hopes for França to medal in the 100-metre breaststroke at the 2012 Summer Olympics, but he was unable to get his time under the 1 minute mark and ultimately finished in 12th place. His rival, Cameron Van der Burgh, won the Olympic gold and broke the world record in the 100-metre breaststroke. França also participated in the 4×100-metre medley, finishing in 15th place.

=== 2014 ===
At the 2014 Pan Pacific Swimming Championships in Gold Coast, Queensland, Australia, he won a silver medal in the 100-metre breaststroke. He also finished 4th in the 4x100-metre medley relay, along with Guilherme Guido, Thiago Pereira and Marcelo Chierighini, and obtained a 13th place in the 200-metre breaststroke heats, didn't swimming the B final.

On 4 September 2014, participating in the José Finkel Trophy (short course competition) in Guaratinguetá, he broke the Americas record in the 100-metre breaststroke with a time of 56.25.

At the 2014 FINA World Swimming Championships (25 m) in Doha, Qatar, França won five gold medals, into the best Brazilian participation of all time, where the country won the competition for the first time. At 4 December, in the Men's 4 × 50 metre medley relay, formed by França, César Cielo, Nicholas Santos and Guilherme Guido, considered the "Dream Team" by Cielo (formed only by medalists or world champions in their respective individual events), Brazil won the gold shattering the world record with a time of 1:30.51. At the same day, he also won the gold medal in the Men's 100 metre breaststroke, with a time of 56.29, Championship record; and in the 4 × 50 metre mixed medley relay, along with Nicholas Santos, Etiene Medeiros and Larissa Oliveira, breaking the South American record with a time of 1:37.26, only 0.09 seconds from beating USA's world record (1:37.17). At 7 December, França won more two gold medals: in the Men's 50 metre breaststroke, with a time of 25.63 (Americas and Championship record), and in the Men's 4 × 100 metre medley relay, with a time of 3:21.14, South American record. The 5 gold medals made França the largest single winner of the World Championship in Doha.

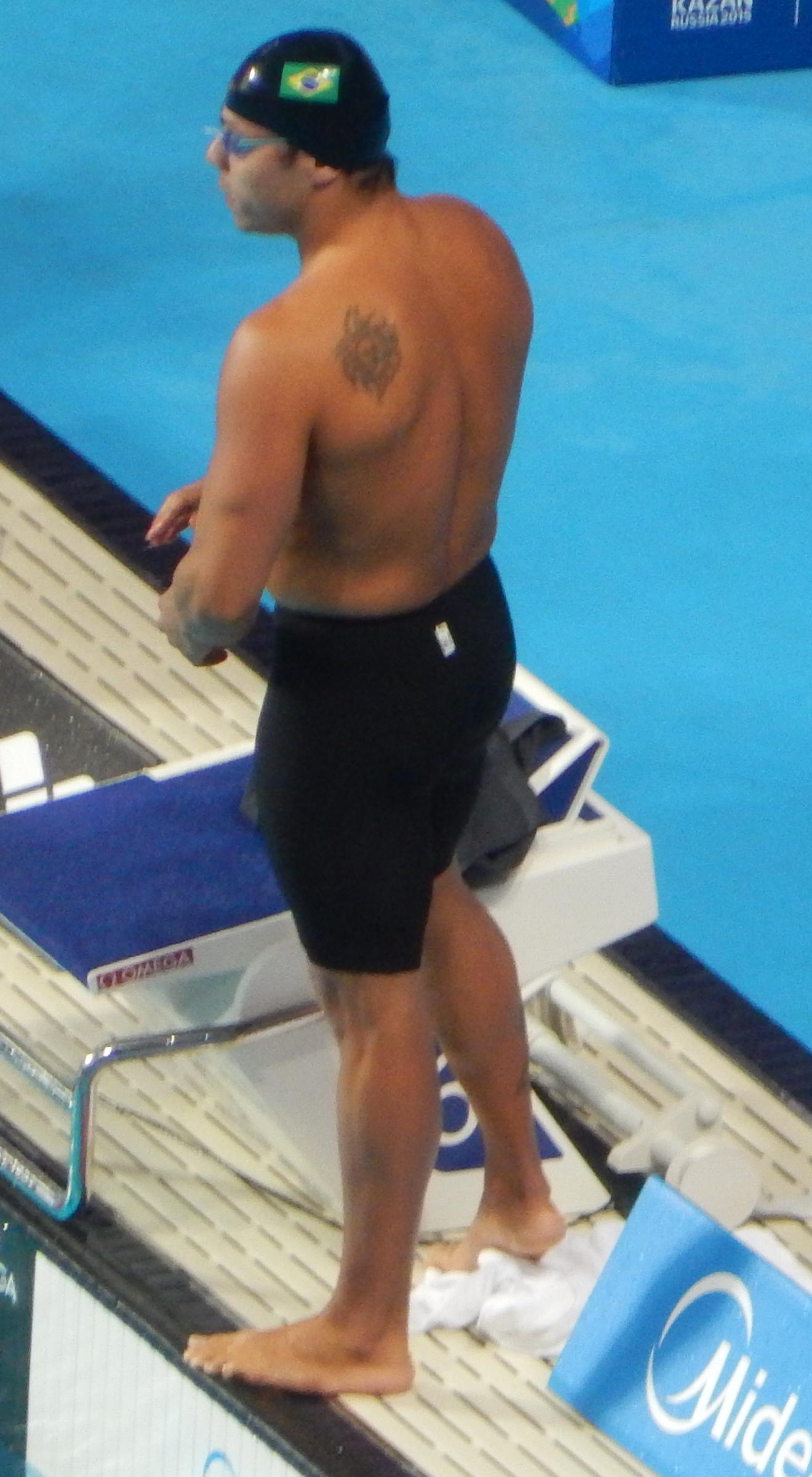
França in Kazan 2015.

=== 2015 ===
At the 2015 Pan American Games in Toronto, Ontario, Canada, França won the gold medal in the 4×100-metre medley relay, where he broke the Pan American Games record with a time of 3:32.68, along with Marcelo Chierighini, Guilherme Guido and Arthur Mendes. Before, he had already won a gold medal in the 100-metre breaststroke, where he broke the Pan American Games record with a time of 59.21.

At the 2015 World Aquatics Championships in Kazan, França qualified with a time of 59.56 in the Men's 100 metre breaststroke heats. In the semifinal, França excessively forced the race and ended up losing speed, making a worse time (59.89) and finished only in 11th place. In the Men's 50 metre breaststroke, he qualified for the final in 4th position with a time of 26.87, his best time since 2012. In the final, curiously he finished in 4th place, repeating the semifinal time. He also finished 38th in the Men's 200 metre breaststroke

=== 2016 ===
At the 2016 Summer Olympics, he broke the South American record at Men's 100 metre breaststroke heats, with a time of 59.01. He went to the final, finishing 7th place. He also participated in the Brazilian 4 × 100 metre medley relay heats.

At the 2016 FINA World Swimming Championships (25 m) in Windsor, Ontario, Canada, he went to the Men's 100 metre breaststroke final, finishing 4th, and to the Men's 50 metre breaststroke final, finishing 5th. He also finished 18th in the Men's 200 metre breaststroke.

== Records ==
França is the current holder of the following records:

Race	Time	Date	Record	Pool
50 m breaststroke	26.76	29 July 2009	Americas	Long Course
50 m breaststroke	25.63	7 December 2014	Americas	Short Course
100 m breaststroke	56.25	4 September 2014	Americas	Short Course
4x50 m medley	1:30.51	4 December 2014	World	Short Course
4 × 100 m medley	3:21.14	7 December 2014	South American	Short Course
4x50 m mixed medley	1:37.26	4 December 2014	South American	Short Course

Felipe França Silva is also a former holder of the following records:

Race	Time	Date	Record	Pool
50 m breaststroke	26.89	8 May 2009	World	Long Course

Records
Preceded by Cameron van der Burgh	Men's 50 metre breaststroke world record holder (long course); 8 May 2009 – 28 July 2009	Succeeded by Cameron van der Burgh
