= May Jouvenez =

French synchronized swimmer

Personal information
- Nationality: French
- Born: 15 February 1994 (age 32) Arles
- Height: 173 cm (5 ft 8 in) (2013)
- Weight: 64 kg (141 lb) (2013)

Sport
- Country: France
- Sport: Synchronized swimming
- Event(s): Solo, Duet, Team, Combination
- Club: Dockers Club Sétois

Achievements and titles
- World finals: 2013 World Aquatics Championships

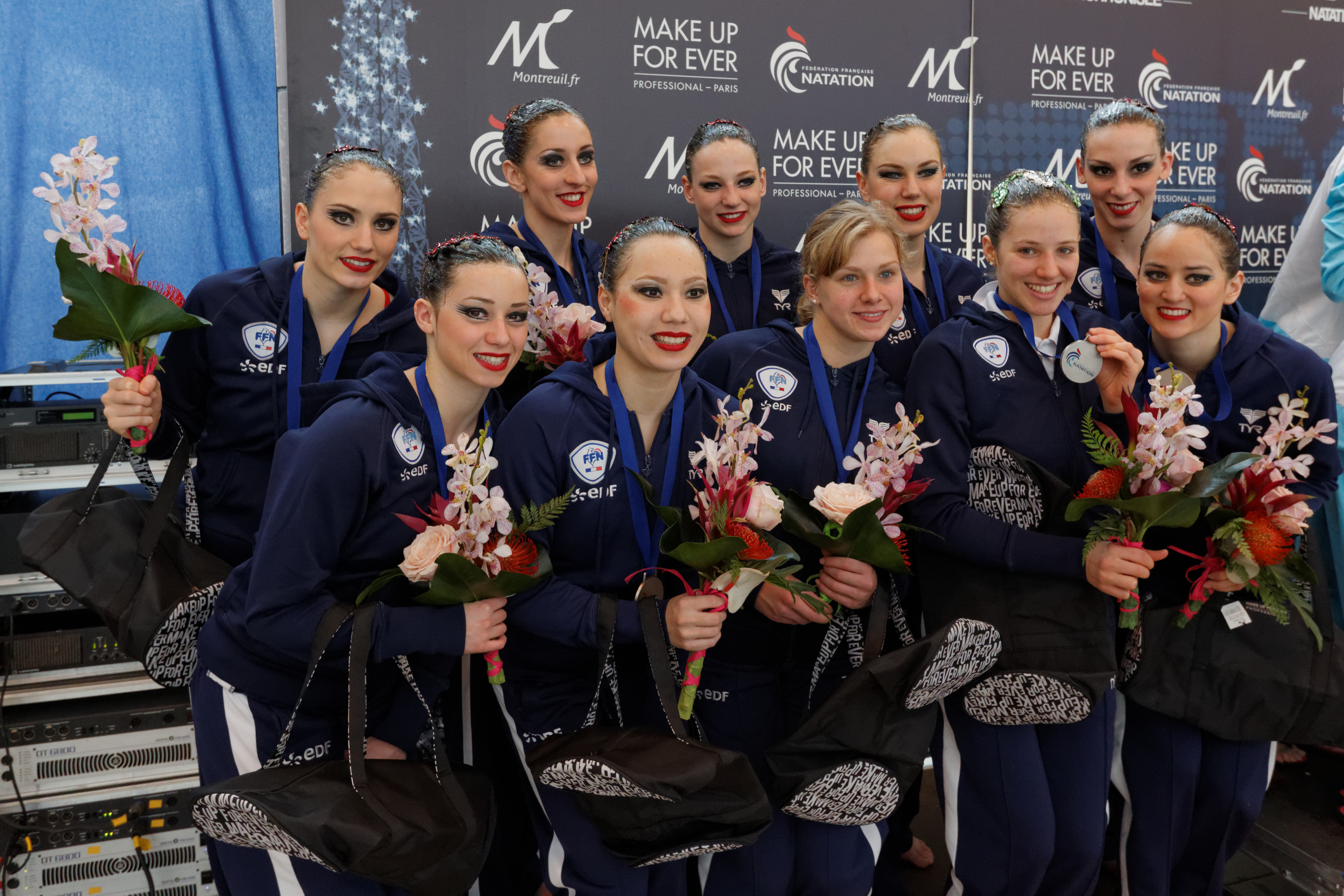
French team at the 2013 French Open. Top: Maëva Charbonnier, Laura Augé, May Jouvenez, Margaux Chrétien, Marie Annequin. Bottom: Léa Catania, Chloé Kautzmann, Lisa Richaud, Iphinoé Davvetas, Lauriane Pontat.

May Jouvenez (born 15 February 1994) is a French competitor in synchronized swimming who competed in the 2013 World Aquatics Championships.

== Personal ==
Jouvenez was born on 15 February 1994 in Arles. She is studying biology at Pierre-and-Marie-Curie University. Kautzmann is 173 centimetres (5 ft 8 in) tall and weighs 64 kilograms (140 lb).

== Synchronized swimming ==
Jouvenez is a synchronized swimmer, starting in the sport when she was seven years old in the team of Dockers Club Sétois. She joined the National Senior Team and the National Institute of Sport and Physical Education in September 2012.

Jouvenez was part of the French Synchronised Swimming Team that swam at Barcelona 2013. She finished 7th in the team free routine, in the team technical routine and 8th in the free routine combination.

== Career records ==
Solo
2011, Junior France National Championships, 2nd
2012, Junior World Championships, Volos, 11th
2012, Junior France National Championships, 2nd

Duet
2010, Junior France National Championships, 1st
2011, Junior European Championships, Belgrade, 6th
2012, Junior France National Championships, 3rd

Team
2011, Junior France National Championships, 3rd
2011, Junior European Championships, Belgrade, 6th
2012, Junior World Championships, Volos, 10th
2012, Junior France National Championships, 2nd
2013, World Championships, Barcelona, 7th

Combination
2010, Junior France National Championships, 1st
2012, Junior France National Championships, 3rd
2013, World Championships, Barcelona, 8th
