= Lisa Richaud =

French synchronized swimmer

Personal information
- Nationality: French
- Born: 6 September 1994 (age 31) Aix-en-Provence
- Height: 167 cm (5 ft 6 in) (2014)
- Weight: 54 kg (119 lb) (2014)

Sport
- Country: France
- Sport: Synchronized swimming
- Event(s): Duet, Team, Combination
- Club: Pays d'Aix Natation

Achievements and titles
- World finals: 2013 World Aquatics Championships

Lisa Richaud (born 6 September 1994) is a French competitor in synchronized swimming who competed in the 2013 World Aquatics Championships.

== Personal ==
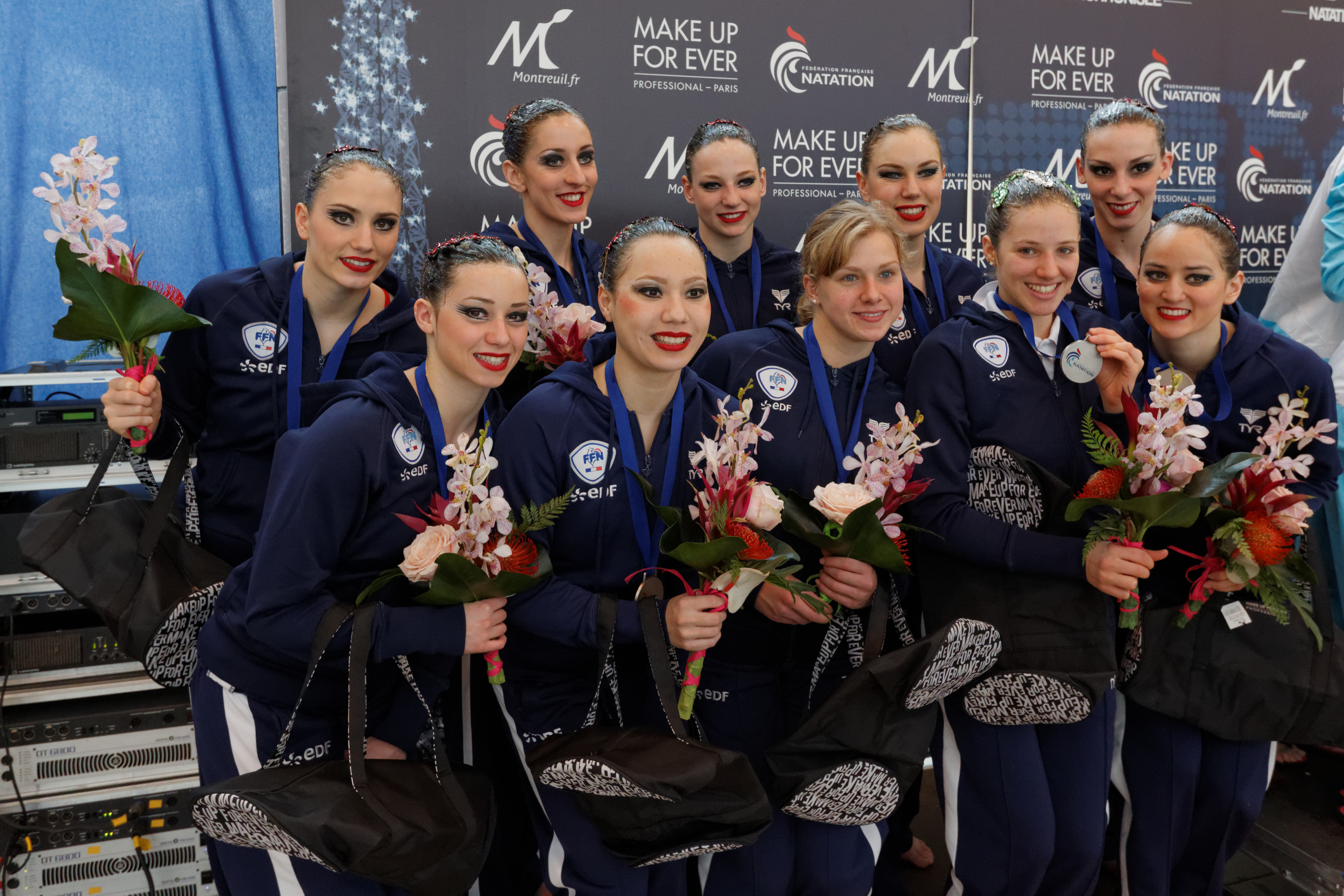
French team at the 2013 French Open. Top: Maëva Charbonnier, Laura Augé, May Jouvenez, Margaux Chrétien, Marie Annequin. Bottom: Léa Catania, Chloé Kautzmann, Lisa Richaud, Iphinoé Davvetas, Lauriane Pontat.

Richaud was born on 6 September 1994 in Aix-en-Provence. She is studying sport and exercise science. she is 167 centimetres (5 ft 6 in) tall and weighs 54 kilograms (119 lb).

== Synchronized swimming ==
Richaud is a synchronized swimmer, starting in the sport when she was five years old in the team of Pays d'Aix Natation.

Richaud was part of the French Synchronised Swimming Team that swam at Barcelona 2013. She finished 7th in the team free routine, in the team technical routine and 8th in the free routine combination.

== Career records ==
Duet
2012, Junior France National Championships, 1st

Team
2010, Junior European Championships, Tampere, 6th
2010, Junior World Championships, Indianapolis, 9th
2011, Junior European Championships, Belgrade, 6th
2012, Junior France National Championships, 1st
2012, Junior World Championships, Volos, 10th
2013, World Championships, Barcelona, 7th
2014, European Championships, Berlin, 5th

Combination
2013, World Championships, Barcelona, 8th
