= Estel-Anaïs Hubaud =

French synchronized swimmer

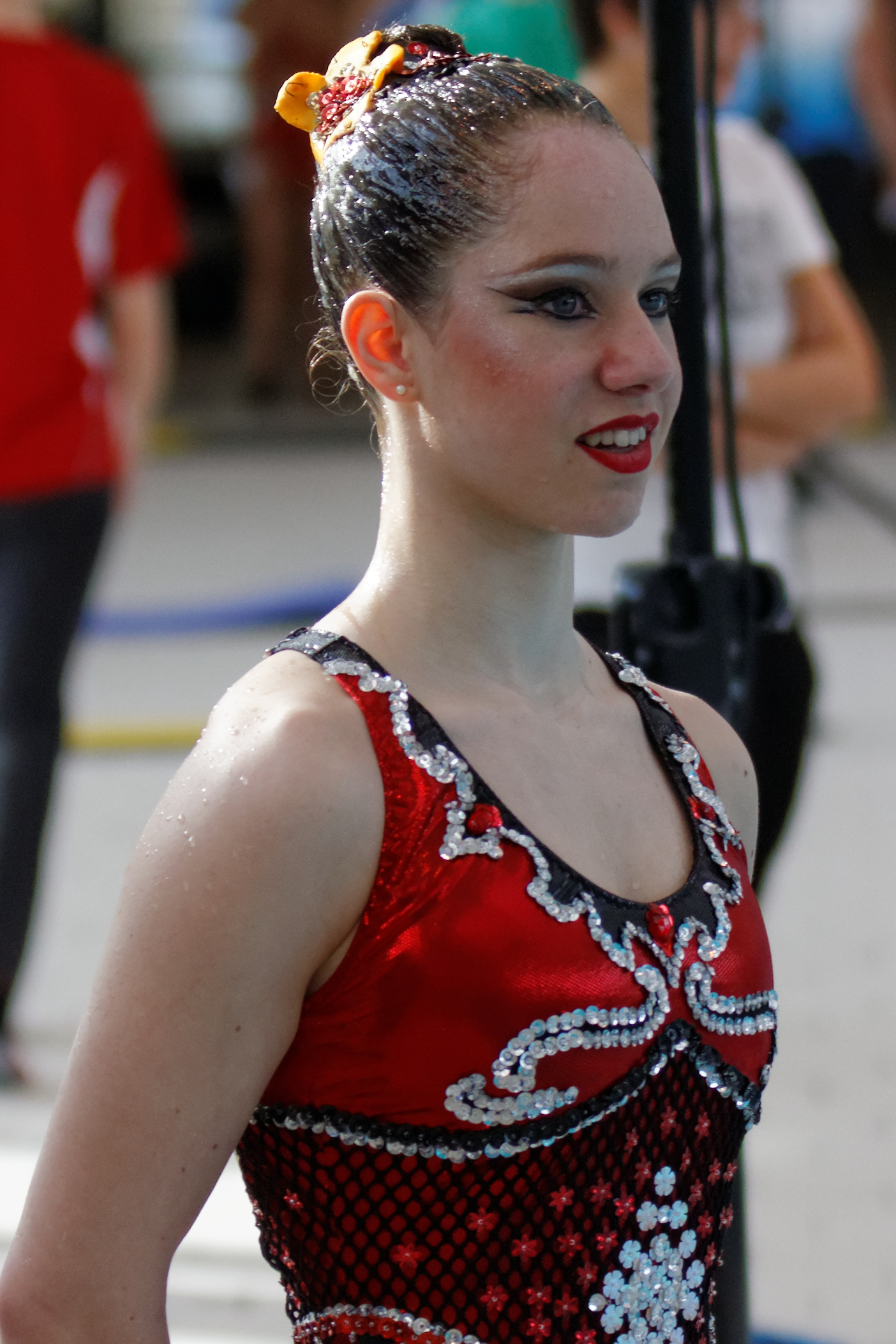
- Estel-Anaïs Hubaud in March 2013

Personal information
- Nationality: French
- Born: 27 August 1996 (age 29) Gap
- Height: 158 cm (5 ft 2 in) (2013)
- Weight: 45 kg (99 lb) (2013)

Sport
- Country: France
- Sport: Synchronized swimming
- Event(s): Solo, Duet, Team, Combination
- Club: Pays d'Aix Natation

Achievements and titles
- World finals: 2013 World Aquatics Championships

Estel-Anaïs Hubaud (born 27 August 1996) is a French competitor in synchronized swimming who competed in the 2013 World Aquatics Championships.

== Personal ==
Hubaud was born on 27 Auguste 1996 in Gap. At 16 years old, she has a baccalauréat in scientific fields and is studying biology.

She is 160 centimetres (5 ft 1 in) tall and weighs 45 kilograms (140 lb).

== Synchronized swimming ==
Hubaud is a synchronized swimmer. She discovered the sport when she was six years old.

In 2013, she won three gold medal at the Junior French National Championships and solo bronze medal at the Junior European Championships.

She represented France, for the first time in a senior competition, at the 2013 World Aquatics Championships. She competed in the free solo synchronized swimming competition France team didn't take part in the technical solo. Hubaud was the youngest participant of the final of solo free routine. She finished 11th from a field of 34, with a score of 41.950 in technical merit and 42.130 in artistic impression

== Career records ==
Solo
2013, Junior France National Championships, 1st
2013, Junior European Championships, Poznań, 3rd
2013, World Championships, Barcelona, 11th

Duet
2013, Junior France National Championships, 1st
2013, Junior European Championships, Poznań, 4th (with Camille Guerre)

Team
2012, Junior World Championships, Volos, 10th (with Morgane Beteille, Maureen Dos Santos, Camille Guerre, May Jouvenez, Lisa Richaud, Laurie Savary, Fanny Soulard)
2013, Junior France National Championships, 1st
2013, Junior European Championships, Poznań, 6th (with Morgane Beteille, Alice Boucher, Maureen Dos Santos, Camille Guerre, Louise Pastres, Estelle Philibert, Fanny Soulard)
