= 2014 Pan Pacific Swimming Championships – Men's 100 metre breaststroke =

Men's 100 metre breaststroke at the 2014 Pan Pacific Swimming Championships
- Venue: Gold Coast Aquatic Centre
- Dates: 22 August 2014 (heats & finals)
- Competitors: 20
- Winning time: 59.62

Medalists
gold medal	Yasuhiro Koseki	Japan
silver medal	Felipe França	Brazil
bronze medal	Glenn Snyders	New Zealand

The men's 100 metre breaststroke competition at the 2014 Pan Pacific Swimming Championships took place on 22 August at the Gold Coast Aquatic Centre, Queensland, Australia. The last champion was Kosuke Kitajima of Japan.

This race consisted of two lengths of the pool, both lengths being in breaststroke.

== Records ==
Prior to this competition, the existing world and Pan Pacific records were as follows:

World record	Cameron van der Burgh (RSA)	58.46	London, UK	29 July 2012
Pan Pacific Championships record	Kosuke Kitajima (JPN)	59.04	Irvine, United States	19 August 2010

== Results ==
All times are in minutes and seconds.

KEY:	q	Fastest non-qualifiers	Q	Qualified	CR	Championships record	NR	National record	PB	Personal best	SB	Seasonal best

=== Heats ===
The first round was held on 22 August, at 10:20.

Rank	Name	Nationality	Time	Notes
1	Kevin Cordes	United States	59.70	QA
2	Felipe França	Brazil	59.92	QA
3	Yasuhiro Koseki	Japan	1:00.20	QA
4	Glenn Snyders	New Zealand	1:00.41	QA
5	Jake Packard	Australia	1:00.44	QA
6	Nicolas Fink	United States	1:00.72	QA
7	Richard Funk	Canada	1:00.82	QA
8	Naoya Tomita	Japan	1:01.11	QA
9	Hirome Sakimoto	Japan	1:01.16	QB
10	João Luiz Gomes Júnior	Brazil	1:01.17	QB
11	Kazuki Kohinata	Japan	1:01.28	QB
12	Yuta Oshikiri	Japan	1:01.49	QB
13	Cody Miller	United States	1:01.54	QB
14	Tales Cerdeira	Brazil	1:02.06	QB
15	Joshua Hall	Philippines	1:02.41	QB
16	Lyam Dias	Canada	1:03.23	QB
17	Jared Pike	South Africa	1:03.34	
18	Ronald Tsui	Hong Kong	1:03.53	
19	Wong Chun Yan	Hong Kong	1:04.12	
20	Song Molin	China	1:05.15	

=== B Final ===
The B final was held on 22 August, at 19:54.

Rank	Name	Nationality	Time	Notes
9	Cody Miller	United States	1:00.76	
10	João Luiz Gomes Júnior	Brazil	1:00.99	
11	Hirome Sakimoto	Japan	1:01.54	
12	Tales Cerdeira	Brazil	1:02.44	
13	Lyam Dias	Canada	1:03.03	
14	Joshua Hall	Philippines	1:03.18	
15	Jared Pike	South Africa	1:03.20	
16	Ronald Tsui	Hong Kong	1:03.52	

=== A Final ===
The A final was held on 22 August, at 19:54.

Rank	Name	Nationality	Time	Notes
1st place, gold medalist(s)	Yasuhiro Koseki	Japan	59.62	
2nd place, silver medalist(s)	Felipe França	Brazil	59.82	
3rd place, bronze medalist(s)	Glenn Snyders	New Zealand	1:00.18	
4	Nicolas Fink	United States	1:00.24	
5	Richard Funk	Canada	1:00.36	
6	Jake Packard	Australia	1:00.54	
7	Naoya Tomita	Japan	1:01.08	
-	Kevin Cordes	United States	DSQ	
