= 2014 FINA World Swimming Championships (25 m) – Men's 4 × 50 metre medley relay =

Men's 4 × 50 metre medley relay at the 2014 FINA World Swimming Championships (25 m)
- Dates: 3 December
- Competitors: 68 from 17 nations
- Winning time: 1:30.51

Medalists
gold medal	Guilherme Guido; Felipe França Silva; Nicholas Santos; César Cielo	Brazil
silver medal	Benjamin Stasiulis; Giacomo Perez-Dortona; Mehdy Metella; Florent Manaudou	France
bronze medal	Eugene Godsoe; Cody Miller; Tom Shields; Josh Schneider	United States

The men's 4 × 50 metre medley relay competition of the 2014 FINA World Swimming Championships (25 m) was held on 4 December.

== Records ==
Prior to the competition, the existing world and championship records were as follows.

	Nation	Time	Location	Date
World record	Italy	1:33.65	Herning	12 December 2013

The following records were established during the competition:

Date	Event	Nation	Time	Record
4 December	Heats	Russia	1:32.78	WR
4 December	Final	Brazil	1:30.51	WR

== Results ==
=== Heats ===
The heats were held at 09:30.

Rank	Heat	Lane	Nation	Swimmers	Time	Notes
1	2	8	Russia	Stanislav Donetc (23.73); Sergey Geybel (25.96); Aleksandr Popkov (22.47); Evgeny Sedov (20.62)	1:32.78	Q, WR
2	2	7	France	Benjamin Stasiulis (23.49); Giacomo Perez-Dortona (25.92); Mehdy Metella (22.45); Clément Mignon (21.24)	1:33.10	Q
3	2	3	United States	Matt Grevers (23.37); Brad Craig (26.46); Tom Shields (22.29); Josh Schneider (21.13)	1:33.25	Q
4	2	1	Brazil	Henrique Martins (23.90); João Luiz Gomes Júnior (26.29); Nicholas Santos (22.36); João de Lucca (20.93)	1:33.48	Q
5	2	4	Great Britain	Chris Walker-Hebborn (23.67); Adam Peaty (25.83); Adam Barrett (22.91); Ben Proud (21.46)	1:33.87	Q
6	1	6	South Africa	Charl Crous (24.43); Cameron van der Burgh (26.20); Chad le Clos (22.12); Luke Pendock (21.56)	1:34.31	Q
7	2	6	Italy	Niccolo Bonacchi (23.74); Andrea Toniato (26.45); Marco Belotti (22.78); Luca Leonardi (21.46)	1:34.43	Q
8	1	1	Lithuania	Danas Rapšys (24.19); Giedrius Titenis (26.11); Tadas Duškinas (22.72); Mindaugas Sadauskas (21.79)	1:34.81	Q
9	2	5	Japan	Yuki Shirai (23.90); Yasuhiro Koseki (26.38); Katsumi Nakamura (23.04); Reo Sakata (21.67)	1:34.99	AS
10	2	2	Croatia	Sasa Gerbec (25.13); Kristijan Tomic (26.31); Mario Todorović (22.87); Ivan Levaj (21.27)	1:35.58	
11	2	9	Paraguay	Charles Hockin (25.16); Renato Prono (27.04); Max Abreu (23.65); Ben Hockin (21.88)	1:37.73	
12	1	4	Philippines	Fahad Alkhaldi (27.32); Joshua Hall (27.75); Dhill Lee (23.90); Axel Ngui (23.67)	1:42.64	
13	1	7	Macau	Yum Cheng Man (27.88); Chao Man Hou (27.71); Sio Ka Kun (25.49); Wong Pok Lao (24.22)	1:45.30	
14	1	8	Lebanon	Maroun Waked (27.57); Charlie Salame (29.84); Adam Ismail Allouche (25.18); Mahmoud Daaboul (24.96)	1:47.55	
15	2	0	Papua New Guinea	Nathan Nades (28.63); Livingston Aika (33.54); Ryan Pini (22.94); Stanford Kawale (24.09)	1:49.20	
16	1	5	Gibraltar	Jordan Gonzalez (28.50); John Paul Llanelo (30.72); Jim Sanderson (26.06); Colin Bensadon (24.78)	1:50.06	
17	1	0	Albania	Aleksander Ngresi (32.28); Deni Baholli (31.75); Franci Aleksi (27.48); Klavio Meça (25.35)	1:56.86	
—	1	2	Algeria		DNS	
—	1	3	China		DNS	

=== Final ===
The final was held at 18:00.

Rank	Lane	Nation	Swimmers	Time	Notes
1st place, gold medalist(s)	6	Brazil	Guilherme Guido (23.42); Felipe França Silva (25.33); Nicholas Santos (21.68); César Cielo (20.08)	1:30.51	WR
2nd place, silver medalist(s)	5	France	Benjamin Stasiulis (23.41); Giacomo Perez-Dortona (25.74); Mehdy Metella (22.06); Florent Manaudou (20.04)	1:31.25	ER
3rd place, bronze medalist(s)	3	United States	Eugene Godsoe (23.11); Cody Miller (26.04); Tom Shields (21.99); Josh Schneider (20.69)	1:31.83	
4	4	Russia	Sergey Fesikov (23.45); Kirill Prigoda (25.96); Aleksandr Popkov (22.31); Vladimir Morozov (20.43)	1:32.15	
5	2	Great Britain	Chris Walker-Hebborn (23.31); Adam Peaty (25.71); Adam Barrett (22.23); Ben Proud (21.05)	1:32.30	
6	1	Italy	Niccolo Bonacchi (23.39); Fabio Scozzoli (25.80); Matteo Rivolta (23.02); Marco Orsi (20.47)	1:32.68	
7	8	Lithuania	Danas Rapšys (24.05); Giedrius Titenis (26.12); Tadas Duškinas (22.65); Mindaugas Sadauskas (21.53)	1:34.35	NR
8	7	South Africa	Ricky Ellis (24.18); Giulio Zorzi (26.50); Clayton Jimmie (22.92); Luke Pendock (21.45)	1:35.05	
