= Giacomo Perez-Dortona =

French swimmer

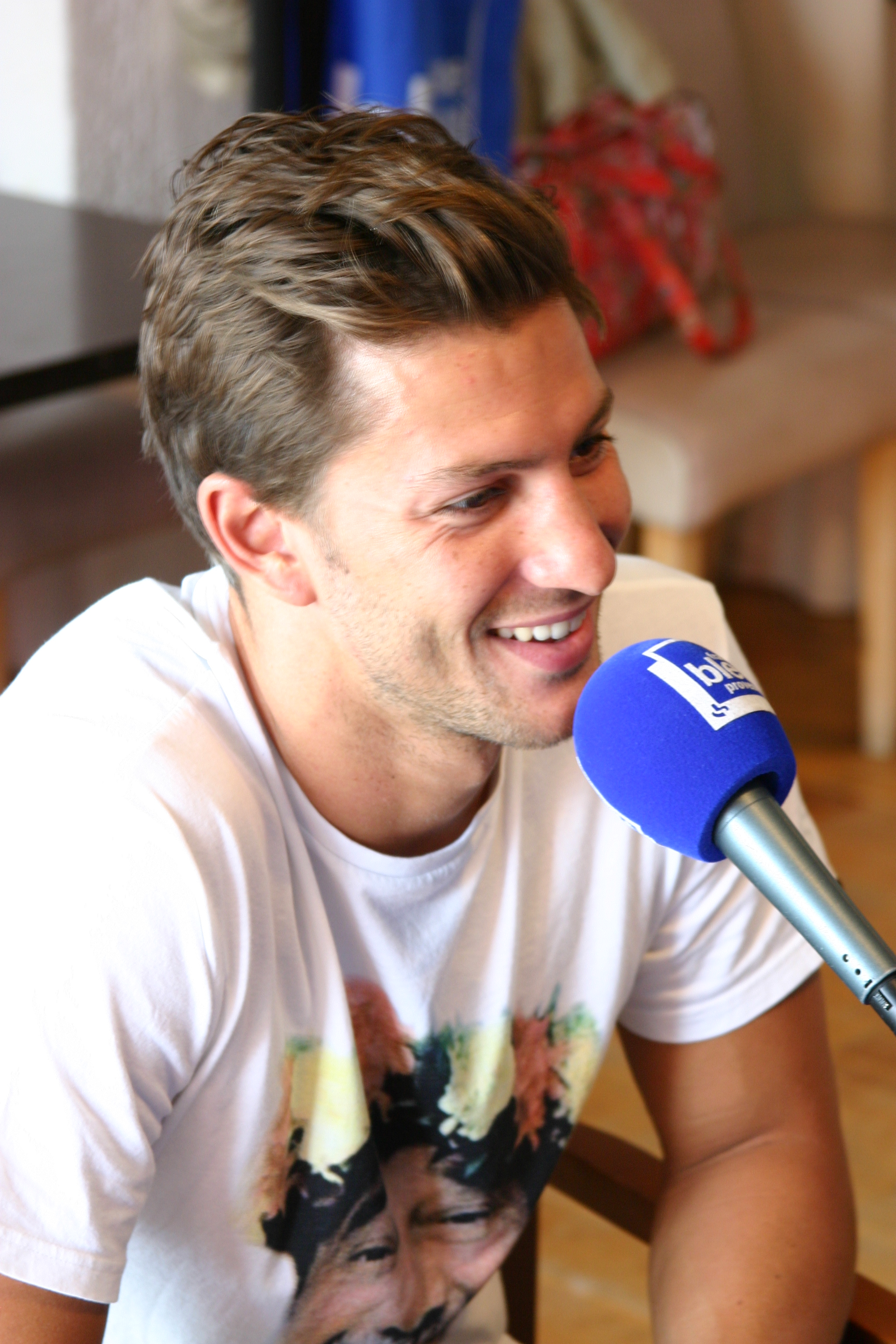

Personal information
- Full name: Giacomo Perez-Dortona
- National team: France
- Born: 11 November 1989 (age 36) La Seyne-sur-Mer, France
- Height: 1.83 m (6 ft 0 in)
- Weight: 82 kg (181 lb)

Sport
- Sport: Swimming
- Strokes: Breaststroke
- Club: CN Marseille
Medal record
Men's swimming
Representing France
World Championships (LC)
Gold medal – first place	2013 Barcelona	4×100m medley
Bronze medal – third place	2015 Kazan	4×100 m medley
World Championships (SC)
Silver medal – second place	2014 Doha	4×50 m medley
Bronze medal – third place	2014 Doha	100 m breaststroke
Bronze medal – third place	2014 Doha	4×100 m medley
European Championships (LC)
Silver medal – second place	2014 Berlin	4×100 m medley
Silver medal – second place	2016 London	4×100 m medley
European Championships (SC)
Gold medal – first place	2012 Chartres	4×50 m medley
Silver medal – second place	2013 Herning	50 m breaststroke
Bronze medal – third place	2012 Chartres	100 m breaststroke

Giacomo Perez-Dortona or d'Ortona (born 11 November 1989) is a retired French competitive swimmer belonging to club CN Marseille. At the 2012 Summer Olympics, he competed in the men's 100 metre breaststroke, finishing in 17th place in the heats, failing to reach the semifinals. He was also part of the French men's 4 x 100 m medley relay team.
