= Marie Annequin =

French synchronized swimmer

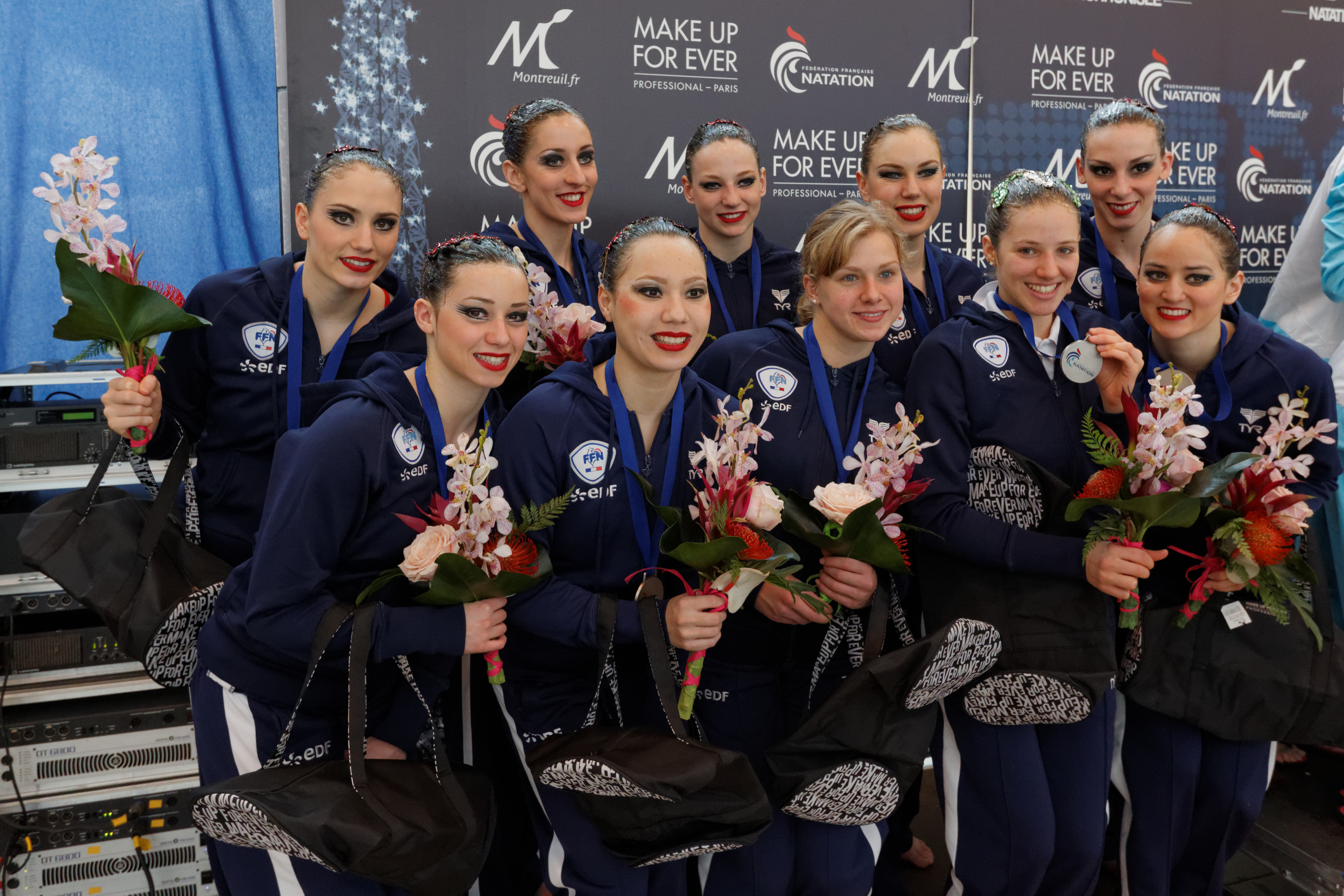
- French team at the 2013 French Open. Top: Maëva Charbonnier, Laura Augé, May Jouvenez, Margaux Chrétien, Marie Annequin. Bottom: Léa Catania, Chloé Kautzmann, Lisa Richaud, Iphinoé Davvetas, Lauriane Pontat.

Personal information
- Nationality: French
- Born: 19 February 1992 (age 34) Lyon
- Height: 177 cm (5 ft 10 in) (2013)
- Weight: 64 kg (141 lb) (2013)

Sport
- Country: France
- Sport: Synchronized swimming
- Event(s): Team, Combination
- Club: Aqua Synchro Lyon

Achievements and titles
- World finals: 2013 World Aquatics Championships

Marie Annequin (born 19 February 1992) is a French competitor in synchronized swimming who competed in the 2013 World Aquatics Championships.

== Personal ==
Annequin was born on 19 February 1992 in Lyon. She is preparing a technician certificate (BTS) Design d'espace remotely. She is 177 centimetres (5 ft 1 in) tall and weighs 64 kilograms (140 lb).

== Synchronized swimming ==
Annequin is a synchronized swimmer, starting in the sport when she was eleven years old in the team of Chassieu Natation.

Annequin represented France in free routine combination events. She finished 4th at the 2012 European Aquatics Championships and 7th at the 2013 World Aquatics Championships, both in the technical routine and free routine. With Chloé Kautzmann, she is captain of the French team.

She's also a member of the French team during combination events. At the 2013 World Aquatics Championships, the team finished 8th scoring 43,380 in the technical merit, 43,440 in the artistic impression.

== Career records ==
Duet
2010, Junior France National Championships, 4th
2010, Junior World Championships, Indianapolis, 6th (substitute)

Team
2009, Junior France National Championships, 2nd
2009, Junior European Championships, Gloucester, 6th
2010, Junior France National Championships, 2nd
2010, Junior European Championships, Tampere, 6th
2010, Junior World Championships, Indianapolis, 9th
2012, European Championships, Eindhoven, 4th
2013, World Championships, Barcelona, 7th

Combination
2009, Junior France National Championships, 2nd
2010, Junior France National Championships, 2nd
2013, World Championships, Barcelona, 8th
