= Laura Augé =

French synchronized swimmer

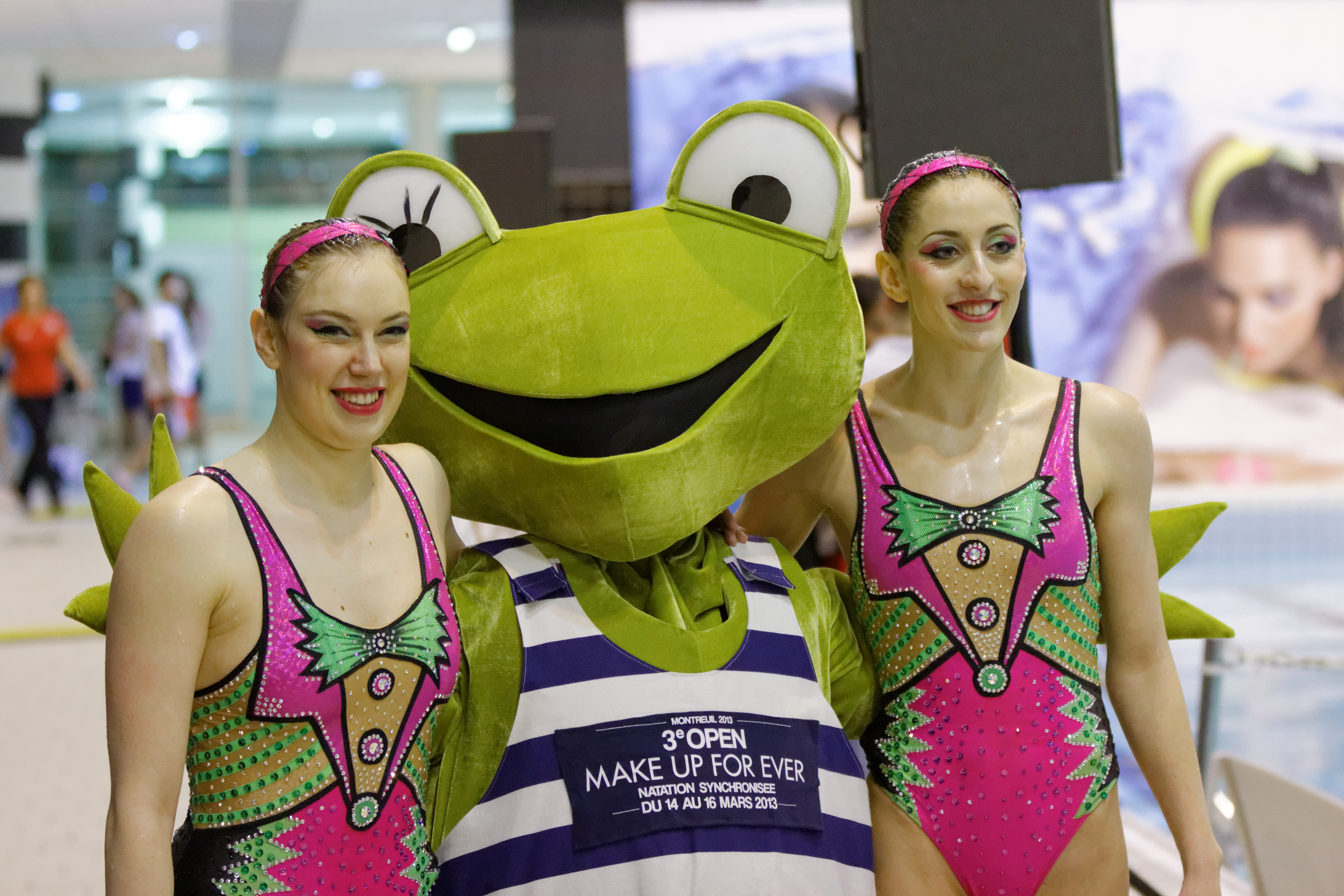
- Margaux Chrétien (left) and Laura Augé in March 2013

Personal information
- Nationality: French
- Born: 17 January 1992 (age 34) Marseille
- Height: 175 cm (5 ft 9 in) (2013)
- Weight: 60 kg (132 lb) (2013)

Sport
- Country: France
- Sport: Synchronized swimming
- Events: Duet, Team, Combination
- Club: Pays d'Aix Natation

Achievements and titles
- World finals: 2011 and 2013 World Aquatics Championships

Laura Augé (born 17 January 1992) is a French competitor in synchronized swimming who competed in the 2011 World Aquatics Championships and 2013 World Aquatics Championships.

== Personal ==
Augé was born on 17 January 1992 in Marseille. She is studying physical therapy. Augé is 175 centimetres (5 ft 9 in) tall and weighs 60 kilograms (130 lb).

== Synchronized swimming ==
Augé is a synchronized swimmer, starting in the sport when she was seven years old in the team of Pays d'Aix Natation. She tried a lot of sports before choosing synchronized swimming as sport number one.

Augé represented France in free routine combination events. She finished 8th at the 2011 World Aquatics Championships, 4th at the 2012 European Aquatics Championships and 7th at the 2013 World Aquatics Championships, both in the technical routine and free routine.

She also competed with Margaux Chrétien at the duet free routine competition at 2013 World Aquatics Championships. She finished 10th with scoring 43,210 in the technical merit, 43,410 in the artistic impression.
