= Margaux Chrétien =

French synchronized swimmer

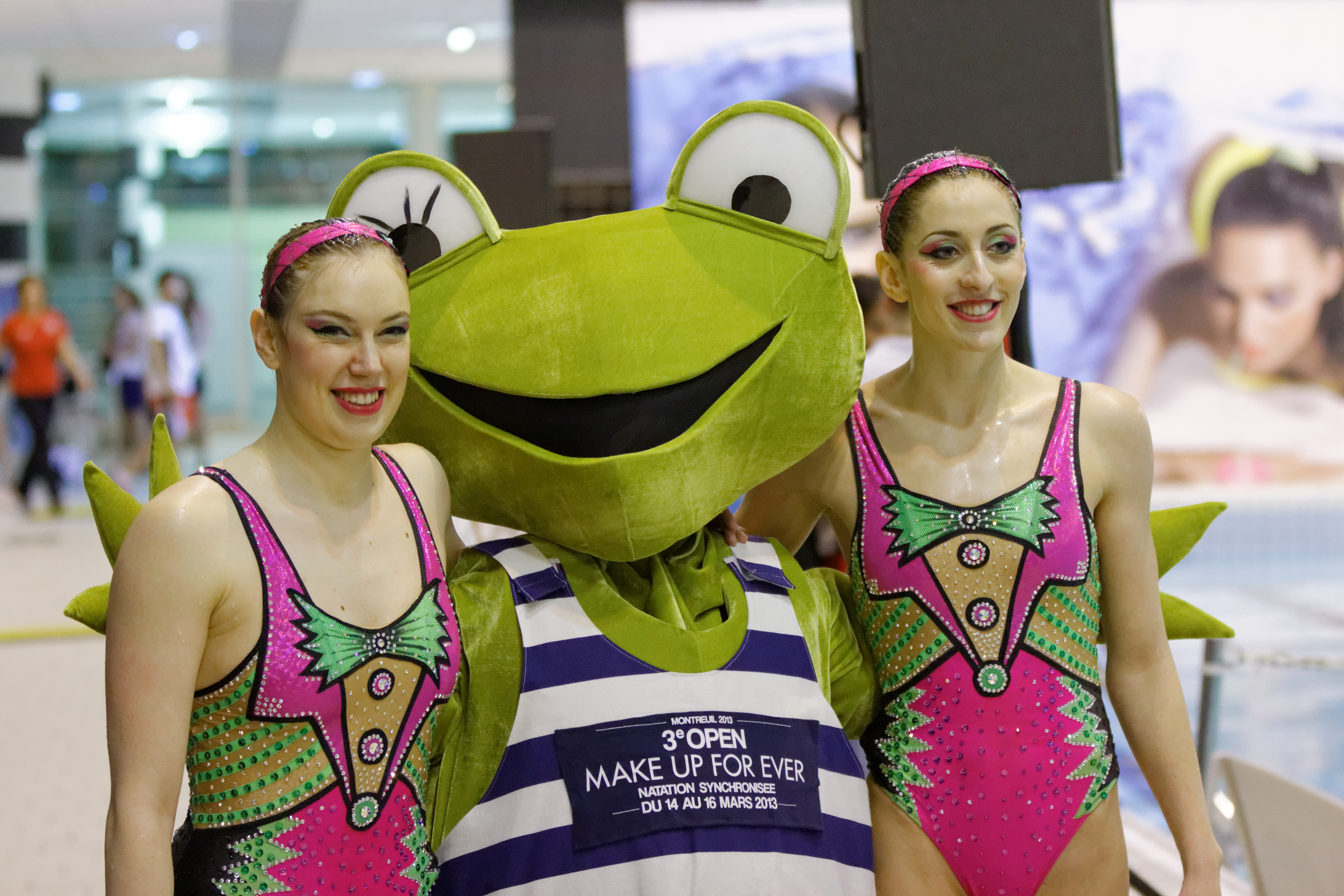
- Margaux Chrétien (left) and Laura Augé in March 2013

Personal information
- Nationality: French
- Born: 11 December 1992 (age 33) Angers
- Height: 172 cm (5 ft 8 in) (2013)
- Weight: 62 kg (137 lb) (2013)

Sport
- Country: France
- Sport: Synchronized swimming
- Events: Solo, Duet, Team, Combination
- Club: Angers Nat Synchro

Achievements and titles
- World finals: 2011 and 2013 World Aquatics Championships

Margaux Chrétien (born 11 December 1992) is a French competitor in synchronized swimming who competed in the 2011 World Aquatics Championships and 2013 World Aquatics Championships.
