= Synchronised swimming at the 2016 European Aquatics Championships – Duet technical routine =

Duet technical routine at the 2016 European Aquatics Championships
- Dates: 13 May
- Competitors: 34 from 17 nations
- Teams: 17
- Winning points: 95.1900

Medalists
gold medal	Natalia Ishchenko; Svetlana Romashina	Russia
silver medal	Lolita Ananasova; Anna Voloshyna	Ukraine
bronze medal	Linda Cerruti; Costanza Ferro	Italy

The Duet technical routine competition of the 2016 European Aquatics Championships was held on 13 May 2016.

== Results ==
The final was held at 08:30.

Rank	Swimmers	Nationality	
Rank	Swimmers	Nationality	Points
1st place, gold medalist(s)	Natalia Ishchenko; Svetlana Romashina	Russia	95.1900
2nd place, silver medalist(s)	Lolita Ananasova; Anna Voloshyna	Ukraine	91.7249
3rd place, bronze medalist(s)	Linda Cerruti; Costanza Ferro	Italy	88.3564
4	Laura Augé; Margaux Chrétien	France	85.4442
5	Eirini-Marina Alexandri; Anna-Maria Alexandri	Austria	84.6775
6	Sascia Kraus; Sophie Giger	Switzerland	81.6252
7	Soňa Bernardová; Alžběta Dufková	Czech Republic	81.5843
8	Iryna Limanouskaya; Veronika Yesipovich	Belarus	81.3948
9	Olivia Allison; Katie Clark	Great Britain	80.4751
10	Anastasia Gloushkov; Ievgeniia Tetelbaum	Israel	79.7445
11	Edith Zeppenfeld; Wiebke Jeske	Germany	75.3894
12	Defne Bakırcı; Mısra Gündeş	Turkey	75.7116
13	Mia Šestan; Rebecca Domika	Croatia	74.8458
14	Hristina Damyanova; Zlatina Dimitrova	Bulgaria	71.8647
15	Lara Mechnig; Marluce Schierscher	Liechtenstein	70.1499
16	Barbara Costa; Cheila Vieira	Portugal	68.3629
17	Jana Pudar; Snežana Majstorović	Serbia	67.4897
