= Great Britain at the 2011 World Aquatics Championships =

- Flag of Great Britain
- World Aquatics code: GBR
- National federation: British Swimming
- Website: www.swimming.org/britishswimming

in Shanghai, China
- Medals Ranked 6th: Gold 3 Silver 3 Bronze 0 Total 6

World Aquatics Championships appearances
- 1973; 1975; 1978; 1982; 1986; 1991; 1994; 1998; 2001; 2003; 2005; 2007; 2009; 2011; 2013; 2015; 2017; 2019; 2022; 2023; 2024; 2025

The Great Britain team competed at the 2011 World Aquatics Championships in Shanghai, China. Britain selected a team of 40, 20 of each gender, for the FINA World Championships in Shanghai.

== Medalists ==
Medal	Name	Sport	Event	Date
Gold	Keri-Anne Payne	Open Water Swimming	Women's 10km	19 July
Gold	Rebecca Adlington	Swimming	Women's 800m Freestyle	30 July
Gold	Liam Tancock	Swimming	Men's 50m Backstroke	31 July
Silver	Rebecca Adlington	Swimming	Women's 400m Freestyle	24 July
Silver	Ellen Gandy	Swimming	Women's 200m Butterfly	28 July
Silver	Hannah Miley	Swimming	Women's 400m Individual Medley	31 July

== Diving ==
Great Britain has qualified 11 athletes in diving.

Men

Athlete	Event	Preliminary		Semifinals		Final	
Athlete	Event	Points	Rank	Points	Rank	Points	Rank
Jack Laugher	Men's 1m Springboard	279.55	33			did not advance	
Jack Laugher	Men's 3m Springboard	4:05.05	18 Q	436.60	11 Q	453.50	8
Chris Mears	Men's 1m Springboard	361.20	14			did not advance	
Chris Mears	Men's 3m Springboard	371.10	30	did not advance			
Thomas Daley	Men's 10m Platform	472.70	8 Q	467.80	6 Q	505.10	5
Peter Waterfield	Men's 10m Platform	415.15	17 Q	452.80	9 Q	4:16.55	11
Chris Mears; Nicholas Robinson Baker	Men's 3m Synchro Springboard	375.66	8 Q			403.68	7
Thomas Daley; Peter Waterfield	Men's 10m Synchro Platform	424.47	5 Q			407.46	6

Women

Athlete	Event	Preliminary		Semifinals		Final	
Athlete	Event	Points	Rank	Points	Rank	Points	Rank
Alicia Blagg	Women's 1m Springboard	212.50	30			did not advance	
Hannah Starling	Women's 1m Springboard	226.40	25			did not advance	
Hannah Starling	Women's 3m Springboard	259.40	27	did not advance			
Rebecca Gallantree	Women's 3m Springboard	251.45	29	did not advance			
Tonia Couch	Women's 10m Platform	317.10	9 Q	313.35	11 Q	315.05	9
Jennifer Cowen	Women's 10m Platform	254.70	24	did not advance			
Alicia Blagg; Rebecca Gallantree	Women's 3m Synchro Springboard	239.40	15			did not advance	
Tonia Couch; Sarah Barrow	Women's 10m Synchro Platform	290.28	4 Q			314.52	4

== Open water swimming ==
Men

Athlete	Event	Final	
Athlete	Event	Time	Position
Thomas James Allen	Men's 10km	1:55:37.4	26
Daniel Lee Fogg	Men's 10km	1:54:46.9	15

Women

Athlete	Event	Final	
Athlete	Event	Time	Position
Cassandra Patten	Women's 5km	DNF	
Cassandra Patten	Women's 10km	2:02:33.6	21
Keri-Anne Payne	Women's 10km	2:01:58.1	Gold medal

== Swimming ==
Great Britain qualified 38 swimmers.

Men

Athlete	Event	Heats		Semifinals		Final	
Athlete	Event	Time	Rank	Time	Rank	Time	Rank
Adam Brown	Men's 50m Freestyle	22.08	4 Q	22.21	13	did not advance	
Adam Brown	Men's 100m Freestyle	49.13	21	did not advance			
Simon Burnett	Men's 50m Freestyle	22.54	23	did not advance			
Simon Burnett	Men's 100m Freestyle	49.25	25	did not advance			
Ross Davenport	Men's 200m Freestyle	1:47.59	8 Q	1:47.76	10	did not advance	
Robert Renwick	Men's 200m Freestyle	1:47.88	11 Q	1:47.89	12	did not advance	
Robert Renwick	Men's 400m Freestyle	3:49.91	18			did not advance	
David Carry	Men's 400m Freestyle	3:48.89	15			did not advance	
Daniel Fogg	Men's 1500m Freestyle	15:13.39	14			did not advance	
Liam Tancock	Men's 50m Backstroke	25.26	10 Q	24.62	1 Q	24.50	Gold medal
Liam Tancock	Men's 100m Backstroke	53.84	4 Q	53.60	7 Q	53.25	6
Chris Walker-Hebborn	Men's 100m Backstroke	54.91	26	did not advance			
Chris Walker-Hebborn	Men's 200m Backstroke	1:58.59	17	did not advance			
James Goddard	Men's 200m Backstroke	DNS		did not advance			
James Goddard	Men's 200m IM	1:59.68	11 Q	1:58.50	6 Q	1:57.79	4
Kristopher Gilchrist	Men's 100m Breaststroke	1:01.46	26	did not advance			
Michael Jamieson	Men's 100m Breaststroke	1:00.79	15 Q	1:00.93	16	did not advance	
Michael Jamieson	Men's 200m Breaststroke	2:11.06	5 Q	2:10.54	6 Q	2:10.67	5
Andrew Willis	Men's 200m Breaststroke	2:11.59	8 Q	2:10.49	5 Q	2:11.29	8
Antony James	Men's 50m Butterfly	23.94	15 Q	23.74	15	did not advance	
Antony James	Men's 100m Butterfly	52.68	19	did not advance			
Michael Rock	Men's 200m Butterfly	1:57.03	16 Q	1:58.78	16	did not advance	
Michael Rock	Men's 100m Butterfly	53.20	25	did not advance			
Joseph Roebuck	Men's 200m Butterfly	1:58.20	24	did not advance			
Joseph Roebuck	Men's 400m IM	4:16.95	10			did not advance	
Yuya Roebuck	Men's 200m IM	2:00.42	19	did not advance			
Roberto Pavoni	Men's 400m IM	4:16.48	8 Q			4:19.85	8
Adam Brown; Liam Tancock; Grant Turner; Simon Burnett	Men's 4 × 100 m Freestyle Relay	3:15.35	8 Q			3:15.03	8
Ross Davenport; David Carry; Jak Scott; Robert Renwick	Men's 4 × 200 m Freestyle Relay	7:13.15	7 Q			7:10.84	6
Liam Tancock; Michael Jamieson; Antony James; Adam Brown	Men's 4 × 100 m Medley Relay	3:36.19	8 Q			3:36.58	6

Women

Athlete	Event	Heats		Semifinals		Final	
Athlete	Event	Time	Rank	Time	Rank	Time	Rank
Francesca Halsall	Women's 50m Freestyle	25.05	7 Q	24.80	5 Q	24.60	4
Francesca Halsall	Women's 100m Freestyle	54.38	9 Q	53.48	1 Q	53.72	4
Amy Smith	Women's 100m Freestyle	54.93	18 Q*	55.33	16	did not advance	
Joanne Jackson	Women's 200m Freestyle	1:59.36	23	did not advance			
Rebecca Adlington	Women's 200m Freestyle	1:59.40	24	did not advance			
Rebecca Adlington	Women's 400m Freestyle	4:07.38	7 Q			4:04.01	Silver medal
Rebecca Adlington	Women's 800m Freestyle	8:22.27	1 Q			8:17.51	Gold medal
Jazmin Carlin	Women's 400m Freestyle	4:09.64	15			did not advance	
Jazmin Carlin	Women's 800m Freestyle	8:34.33	16			did not advance	
Keri-Anne Payne	Women's 1500m Freestyle	16:23:11	12			did not advance	
Georgia Davies	Women's 50m Backstroke	28.39	8 Q	28.26	10	did not advance	
Gemma Spofforth	Women's 50m Backstroke	28.79	15 Q	28.75	13	did not advance	
Gemma Spofforth	Women's 100m Backstroke	1:01.89	23	did not advance			
Elizabeth Simmonds	Women's 100m Backstroke	1:00.38	8 Q	59.80	7 Q	59.89	7
Elizabeth Simmonds	Women's 200m Backstroke	2:10.02	10 Q	2:08.79	8 Q	2:08.76	7
Stephanie Proud	Women's 200m Backstroke	2:10.65	15 Q	2:10.57	13	did not advance	
Stephanie Proud	Women's 400m IM	4:48.31	24			did not advance	
Kate Haywood	Women's 50m Breaststroke	31.30	8 Q	31.43	9	did not advance	
Stacey Tadd	Women's 100m Breaststroke	1:09.08	18	did not advance			
Stacey Tadd	Women's 200m Breaststroke	2:27.88	16	2:26.73	14	did not advance	
Molly Renshaw	Women's 200m Breaststroke	2:28.35	20	did not advance			
Ellen Gandy	Women's 50m Butterfly	27.01	21	did not advance			
Ellen Gandy	Women's 100m Butterfly	58.32	7 Q	57.97	8 Q	57.55	5
Ellen Gandy	Women's 200m Butterfly	2:08.14	4 Q	2:06.73	4 Q	2:05.59	Silver medal
Jemma Lowe	Women's 100m Butterfly	57.81	3 Q	57.57	5 Q	57.96	8
Jemma Lowe	Women's 200m Butterfly	2:08.67	11 Q	2:06.30	1 Q	2:06.64	7
Hannah Miley	Women's 200m IM	2:11.95	7 Q	2:10.95	5 Q	2:11.36	7
Hannah Miley	Women's 400m IM	4:37.39	6 Q			4:34.22	Silver medal
Siobhan-Marie O'Connor	Women's 200m IM	2:14.30	15 Q	2:13.26	13	did not advance	
Amy Smith; Francesca Halsall; Caitlin McClatchey; Rebecca Turner	Women's 4 × 100 m Freestyle	3:39.74	9			did not advance	
Joanne Jackson; Rebecca Turner; Hannah Miley; Caitlin McClatchey	Women's 4 × 200 m Freestyle Relay	7:55.65	4 Q			7:53.51	6
Georgia Davies; Stacey Tadd; Ellen Gandy; Francesca Halsall; Kate Haywood**; Jemma Lowe**; Amy Smith**	Women's 4 × 100 m Medley Relay	3:59.65	5 Q			4:01.09	6

- * qualified due to the withdrawal of another swimmer
- ** raced in heats only

== Synchronised swimming ==
Great Britain has qualified 11 athletes in synchronised swimming.

Women

Athlete	Event	Preliminary		Final	
Athlete	Event	Points	Rank	Points	Rank
Jenna Randall	Solo Technical Routine	89.100	8 Q	89.000	8
Jenna Randall	Solo Free Routine	88.240	9 Q	88.880	8
Olivia Allison; Jenna Randall	Duet Technical Routine	87.800	10 Q	87.300	10
Olivia Allison; Jenna Randall	Duet Free Routine	88.520	9 Q	88.460	8
Olivia Allison; Katie Clark; Katrina Dawkins; Jennifer Knobbs; Victoria Lucass; Asha Randall; Jenna Randall; Katherine Skelton	Team Technical Routine	87.400	10 Q	87.600	10
Katie Clark; Katrina Dawkins; Jennifer Knobbs; Victoria Lucass; Asha Randall; Katherine Skelton; Lauren Smith; Anya Tarasiuk	Team Free Routine	87.909	10 Q	87.280	9
Olivia Allison; Yvette Baker; Katie Clark; Katrina Dawkins; Jennifer Knobbs; Victoria Lucass; Asha Randall; Jenna Randall; Kathrine Skelton; Lauren Smith	Free Routine Combination	87.310	7 Q	87.760	7
