= Synchronised swimming at the 2012 European Aquatics Championships – Duet routine =

The Duet routine competition of the synchronised swimming at the 2012 European Aquatics Championships was held on May 23 with the technical and May 24 with the free routine preliminaries. The final was held on May 27.

== Medalists ==
Gold	Silver	Bronze
Natalia Ishchenko; Svetlana Romashina; Russia	Ona Carbonell; Andrea Fuentes; Spain	Daria Iushko; Kseniya Sydorenko; Ukraine

== Results ==
The preliminary rounds were held at 19:00 local time on May 23–24. The final was held at 12:00 on May 27.

Green denotes finalists

Rank	Swimmer	Nationality	Technical		Free		Final	
Rank	Swimmer	Nationality	Points	Rank	Points	Rank	Points	Rank
1st place, gold medalist(s)	Natalia Ishchenko; Svetlana Romashina	Russia	97.500	1	97.760	1	97.860	1
2nd place, silver medalist(s)	Ona Carbonell; Andrea Fuentes	Spain	95.400	2	95.910	2	95.980	2
3rd place, bronze medalist(s)	Daria Iushko; Kseniya Sydorenko	Ukraine	92.400	3	92.200	3	92.950	3
4	Giulia Lapi; Maria Angela Perrupato	Italy	89.300	4	90.460	4	90.330	4
5	Evangelia Koutidi; Evangelia Platanioti	Greece	88.600	5	89.140	5	89.220	5
6	Sara Labrousse; Chloé Willhelm	France	87.000	6	87.850	6	87.610	6
7	Olivia Allison; Jenna Randall	Great Britain	86.500	7	87.830	7	86.930	7
8	Elisabeth Sneeuw; Nicole Wellen	Netherlands	84.300	9	85.300	9	85.370	8
9	Soňa Bernardová; Alžběta Dufková	Czech Republic	84.800	8	85.370	8	84.880	9
11	Anastasia Gloushkov; Inna Yoffe	Israel	82.400	10	83.090	11	82.740	11
10	Pamela Fischer; Anja Nyffeler	Switzerland	82.000	11	83.230	10	82.920	10
12	Wiebke Jeske; Edith Zeppenfeld	Germany	77.400	12	76.700	13	76.950	12
	Elena Radkova; Kalina Yordanova	Bulgaria	76.600	13	76.740	12		
	Lacin Akcal; Tugce Tanis	Turkey	70.600	14	72.560	14		
	Jasmin Gronman; Nea Hannula	Finland	66.800	15	69.470	15		
	Nadine Brandl; Livia Lang	Austria	DNS					
