= Synchronised swimming at the 2014 European Aquatics Championships – Duet routine =

Duet routine at the Synchronised swimming at the 2014 European Aquatics Championships
- Dates: 13–16 August
- Competitors: 38 from 19 nations
- Winning time: 96.1000

Medalists
gold medal	Daria Korobova; Svetlana Kolesnichenko	Russia
silver medal	Lolita Ananasova; Anna Voloshyna	Ukraine
bronze medal	Ona Carbonell; Paula Klamburg	Spain

The Duet routine competition of the 2014 European Aquatics Championships was held on 13–16 August.

== Results ==
The technical round was held at 15:00 on 13 August. The free round was held at 10:00 on 14 August. The final was held at 10:00 on 16 August.

Green denotes finalists

Rank	Swimmer	Nationality	Technical		Free		Preliminary		Final	
Rank	Swimmer	Nationality	Points	Rank	Points	Rank	Points	Rank	Points	Rank
1st place, gold medalist(s)	Daria Korobova; Svetlana Kolesnichenko	Russia	91.9391	1	95.1333	1	187.0724	1	96.1000	1
2nd place, silver medalist(s)	Lolita Ananasova; Anna Voloshyna	Ukraine	88.9483	3	92.6000	2	181.5483	2	92.9000	2
3rd place, bronze medalist(s)	Ona Carbonell; Paula Klamburg	Spain	89.0664	2	91.4000	3	180.4664	3	92.1667	3
4	Linda Cerruti; Costanza Ferro	Italy	85.3149	4	88.5000	4	173.8149	4	89.4000	4
5	Laura Auge; Margaux Chretien	France	82.5469	5	85.9333	5	168.4802	5	86.0667	5
6	Evangelia Papazoglou; Evangelia Koutidi	Greece	81.9241	6	84.8333	6	166.7574	6	85.0333	6
7	Soňa Bernardová; Alžběta Dufková	Czech Republic	79.6227	7	81.8667	7	161.4894	7	82.8333	7
8	Sascia Kraus; Sophie Giger	Switzerland	76.6233	10	80.2333	9	156.8566	9	81.7667	8
9	Christina Maat; Margot de Graaf	Netherlands	76.7507	9	81.7667	8	158.5174	8	81.6333	9
10	Iryna Limanouskaya; Veronika Yesipovich	Belarus	76.2840	11	79.6333	10	155.9173	10	80.1333	10
11	Jana Labáthová; Nada Daabousová	Slovakia	75.7382	12	77.4333	11	153.1715	12	77.8000	11
12	Anastasia Gloushkov; Ievgeniia Tetelbaum	Israel	77.4981	8	76.8667	12	154.3648	11	77.2667	12
13	Wiebke Jeske; Edith Zeppenfeld	Germany	72.8751	13	74.9667	14	147.8418	13		
14	Jodie Cowie; Genevieve Randall	Great Britain	72.1442	14	75.1000	13	147.2442	14		
15	Szofi Kiss; Dóra Schwarcz	Hungary	71.4691	15	74.5000	15	145.9691	15		
16	Defne Bakirci; Misra Gündeş	Turkey	71.0263	16	72.7667	16	143.7930	16		
17	Lovisa Boerthas; Elin Grahn	Sweden	68.2824	19	72.7000	17	140.9824	17		
18	Rebecca Domika; Tina Panić	Croatia	68.5553	18	72.4000	18	140.9553	18		
19	Kalina Yordanova; Maria Kirkova	Bulgaria	69.0276	17	70.7000	19	139.7276	19		
