= Synchronised swimming at the 2016 European Aquatics Championships – Duet free routine =

Solo free routine at the 2016 European Aquatics Championships
- Dates: 10–11 May
- Competitors: 30 from 15 nations
- Teams: 15
- Winning points: 96.9000

Medalists
gold medal	Natalia Ishchenko; Svetlana Romashina	Russia
silver medal	Lolita Ananasova; Anna Voloshyna	Ukraine
bronze medal	Linda Cerruti; Costanza Ferro	Italy

The Duet free routine competition of the 2016 European Aquatics Championships was held on 10 and 11 May 2016.

== Results ==
The preliminary round was held on 10 May at 09:00. The final was held on 11 May at 16:30.

Green denotes finalists

Rank	Swimmers	Nationality	Preliminary		Final	
Rank	Swimmers	Nationality	Points	Rank	Points	Rank
1st place, gold medalist(s)	Natalia Ishchenko; Svetlana Romashina	Russia	96.4667	1	96.9000	1
2nd place, silver medalist(s)	Lolita Ananasova; Anna Voloshyna	Ukraine	92.2000	2	93.3333	2
3rd place, bronze medalist(s)	Linda Cerruti; Costanza Ferro	Italy	90.5333	3	91.2667	3
4	Laura Augé; Margaux Chrétien	France	85.6667	4	86.2000	4
5	Eirini Alexandri; Anna Alexandri	Austria	85.4333	5	85.9000	5
6	Sascia Kraus; Sophie Giger	Switzerland	83.0333	6	84.2667	6
7	Soňa Bernardová; Alžběta Dufková	Czech Republic	81.9667	7	82.1333	7
8	Olivia Allison; Katie Clark	Great Britain	79.7333	9	81.4333	8
9	Anastasia Gloushkov; Ievgeniia Tetelbaum	Israel	80.6667	8	80.8667	9
10	Defne Bakırcı; Mısra Gündeş	Turkey	76.5333	10	77.2333	10
11	Mia Šestan; Rebecca Domika	Croatia	73.8667	12	75.8000	11
12	Wiebke Jeske; Inken Jeske	Germany	74.8667	11	74.9333	12
13	Hristina Damyanova; Zlatina Dimitrova	Bulgaria	71.8667	13		
14	Nevena Dimitrijević; Jana Pudar	Serbia	70.0667	14		
15	Cheila Vieira; Maria Gonçalves	Portugal	69.0667	15		
