= Synchronised swimming at the 2016 European Aquatics Championships – Solo free routine =

Solo free routine at the 2016 European Aquatics Championships
- Dates: 9–10 May
- Competitors: 20 from 20 nations
- Winning points: 96.4000

Medalists
gold medal	Natalia Ishchenko	Russia
silver medal	Anna Voloshyna	Ukraine
bronze medal	Linda Cerruti	Italy

The Solo free routine competition of the 2016 European Aquatics Championships was held on 9 and 10 May 2016.

== Results ==
The preliminary round was held on 9 May at 09:00. The final was started on 10 May at 16:30.

Green denotes finalists

Rank	Swimmer	Nationality	Preliminary		Final	
Rank	Swimmer	Nationality	Points	Rank	Points	Rank
1st place, gold medalist(s)	Natalia Ishchenko	Russia	95.9667	1	96.4000	1
2nd place, silver medalist(s)	Anna Voloshyna	Ukraine	92.8000	2	93.4000	2
3rd place, bronze medalist(s)	Linda Cerruti	Italy	90.1000	3	89.4333	3
4	Cristina Salvador	Spain	89.3333	4	89.2333	4
5	Evangelia Platanioti	Greece	88.0000	5	88.9667	5
6	Estel-Anaïs Hubaud	France	85.2333	7	85.6667	6
7	Anastasia Gloushkov	Israel	85.2000	6	85.5667	7
8	Vasiliki Alexandri	Austria	82.7000	8	83.6333	8
9	Sascia Kraus	Switzerland	81.6667	10	82.8000	9
10	Olivia Federici	Great Britain	82.0333	9	82.0667	10
11	Margot de Graaf	Netherlands	79.0000	11	80.4333	11
12	Marlene Bojer	Germany	77.8667	12	78.7667	12
13	Lara Mechnig	Liechtenstein	77.3667	13		
14	Defne Bakırcı	Turkey	75.7333	14		
15	Rebecca Domika	Croatia	74.6000	15		
16	Eliška Skácalová	Czech Republic	74.2000	16		
17	Zlatina Dimitrova	Bulgaria	69.0667	17		
18	Nea Hannula	Finland	68.5000	18		
19	Nevena Dimitrijević	Serbia	68.3333	19		
20	Ana Baptista	Portugal	67.2000	20		
