= Synchronized swimming at the 2017 World Aquatics Championships – Duet technical routine =

Duet technical routine at the 2017 World Aquatics Championships
- Venue: City Park
- Location: Budapest, Hungary
- Dates: 14 July (preliminaries); 16 July (final)
- Competitors: 80 from 40 nations
- Teams: 40
- Winning points: 95.0515

Medalists
gold medal	Svetlana Kolesnichenko; Alexandra Patskevich	Russia
silver medal	Jiang Tingting; Jiang Wenwen	China
bronze medal	Anna Voloshyna; Yelyzaveta Yakhno	Ukraine

The Duet technical routine competition at the 2017 World Championships was held on 14 and 16 July 2017.

== Results ==
The preliminary round was started on 14 July at 16:00. The final was held on 16 July at 11:00.

Green denotes finalists

Rank	Nation	Swimmers	Preliminary		Final	
Rank	Nation	Swimmers	Points	Rank	Points	Rank
1st place, gold medalist(s)	Russia	Svetlana Kolesnichenko; Alexandra Patskevich	95.0062	1	95.0515	1
2nd place, silver medalist(s)	China	Jiang Tingting; Jiang Wenwen	92.9033	2	94.0775	2
3rd place, bronze medalist(s)	Ukraine	Anna Voloshyna; Yelyzaveta Yakhno	90.6940	3	92.6482	3
4	Japan	Yukiko Inui; Mai Nakamura	90.1304	4	92.0572	4
5	Spain	Ona Carbonell; Paula Ramírez	89.2965	5	90.7507	5
6	Italy	Linda Cerruti; Costanza Ferro	87.8125	6	89.2463	6
7	Canada	Claudia Holzner; Jacqueline Simoneau	87.7081	7	87.6523	7
8	Austria	Anna-Maria Alexandri; Eirini-Marina Alexandri	85.0805	9	85.7694	8
9	Greece	Evangelia Papazoglou; Evangelia Platanioti	85.8407	8	85.7439	9
10	Mexico	Karem Achach; Nuria Diosdado	84.8320	10	85.2599	10
11	France	Charlotte Tremble; Laura Tremble	83.8932	11	83.9734	11
12	United States	Anita Alvarez; Victoria Woroniecki	83.4526	12	83.4715	12
13	Kazakhstan	Alexandra Nemich; Yekaterina Nemich	83.2379	13	did not advance	
14	North Korea	Jang Hyon-ok; Min Hae-yon	81.5767	14	did not advance	
15	Brazil	Luisa Borges; Maria Clara Coutinho	81.3024	15	did not advance	
16	Belarus	Iryna Limanouskaya; Veronika Yesipovich	80.7824	16	did not advance	
17	Netherlands	Bregje de Brouwer; Noortje de Brouwer	80.3033	17	did not advance	
18	Colombia	Estefanía Álvarez; Mónica Arango	77.8780	18	did not advance	
19	Hungary	Szofi Kiss; Dóra Schwarcz	77.8583	19	did not advance	
20	Czech Republic	Alžběta Dufková; Sabina Langerová	77.8287	20	did not advance	
21	Germany	Marlene Bojer; Daniela Reinhardt	77.4030	21	did not advance	
22	Switzerland	Maxence Bellina; Maria Piffaretti	77.0014	22	did not advance	
23	Uzbekistan	Anastasiya Ruzmetova; Gulsanam Yuldasheva	76.2008	23	did not advance	
24	Turkey	Defne Bakırcı; Mısra Gündeş	75.8019	24	did not advance	
25	Egypt	Samia Hagrass; Dara Tamer	75.5396	25	did not advance	
26	Liechtenstein	Lara Mechnig; Marluce Schierscher	74.9225	26	did not advance	
27	Israel	Eden Blecher; Yael Polka	74.8385	27	did not advance	
28	Singapore	Debbie Soh; Miya Yong	74.7393	28	did not advance	
29	Slovakia	Petra Ďurišová; Diana Miškechová	74.6111	29	did not advance	
30	Argentina	Camila Arregui; Trinidad López	73.8927	30	did not advance	
31	Malaysia	Gan Hua Wei; Lee Lee Yhing Huey	73.1753	31	did not advance	
32	Bulgaria	Daniela Bozadzhieva; Hristina Damyanova	72.4098	32	did not advance	
33	Portugal	Maria Gonçalves; Cheila Vieira	71.7694	33	did not advance	
34	Poland	Julia Mikołajczak; Swietłana Szczepańska	69.6699	34	did not advance	
35	Costa Rica	Fiorella Calvo; Natalia Jenkins	69.2287	35	did not advance	
36	South Africa	Emma Manners-Wood; Laura Strugnell	67.3661	36	did not advance	
37	New Zealand	Eva Morris; Jazzlee Thomas	66.8577	37	did not advance	
38	Cuba	Arisnelvis Arisnelvis; Carysney García	66.1458	38	did not advance	
39	Hong Kong	Haruka Kawazoe; Christie Poon	63.7011	39	did not advance	
40	Philippines	Ruth Abiera; Allyssa Salvador	55.5266	40	did not advance	
