= Artistic swimming at the 2020 European Aquatics Championships – Duet free routine =

Duet free routine at the 2020 European Aquatics Championships
- Venue: Danube Arena
- Dates: 11 May 2021 (preliminary); 14 May 2021 (final)
- Competitors: 40 from 20 nations
- Teams: 20

Medalists
gold medal	Svetlana Kolesnichenko; Svetlana Romashina	Russia
silver medal	Marta Fiedina; Anastasiya Savchuk	Ukraine
bronze medal	Anna-Maria Alexandri; Eirini-Marina Alexandri	Austria

The Duet free routine competition of the 2020 European Aquatics Championships was held on 11 and 14 May 2021.

== Results ==
The preliminary round was held on 11 May at 09:00. The final was held on 14 May at 09:00.

Green denotes finalists

Rank	Nation	Swimmers	Preliminary		Final	
Rank	Nation	Swimmers	Points	Rank	Points	Rank
1st place, gold medalist(s)	Russia	Svetlana Kolesnichenko; Svetlana Romashina	97.4000	1	97.9000	1
2nd place, silver medalist(s)	Ukraine	Marta Fiedina; Anastasiya Savchuk	94.0333	2	94.3333	2
3rd place, bronze medalist(s)	Austria	Anna-Maria Alexandri; Eirini-Marina Alexandri	90.0333	3	90.8667	3
4	Belarus	Vasilina Khandoshka; Daria Kulagina	87.0000	4	88.7333	4
5	Netherlands	Bregje de Brouwer; Noortje de Brouwer	86.8667	5	88.3000	5
6	Italy	Veronica Gallo; Marta Murru	85.6000	6	85.8333	6
7	Great Britain	Kate Shortman; Isabelle Thorpe	85.0667	8	85.8000	7
8	Israel	Eden Blecher; Shelly Bobritsky	85.4333	7	85.7000	8
9	Liechtenstein	Lara Mechnig; Marluce Schierscher	84.4000	9	84.3333	9
10	Switzerland	Vivienne Koch; Joelle Peschl	82.5333	10	83.2667	10
11	Germany	Marlene Bojer; Michelle Zimmer	82.4333	11	82.7000	11
12	San Marino	Jasmine Verbena; Jasmine Zonzini	78.8000	12	80.4333	12
13	Slovakia	Nada Daabousová; Diana Miškechová	78.5000	13	did not advance	
14	Portugal	Maria Gonçalves; Cheila Vieira	77.2667	14	did not advance	
15	Serbia	Nevena Dimitrijević; Jelena Kontić	77.2000	15	did not advance	
16	Czech Republic	Karolína Klusková; Aneta Mrázková	76.6333	16	did not advance	
17	Hungary	Linda Farkas; Szabina Hungler	75.0667	17	did not advance	
18	Finland	Linnea Pitkänen; Sini Tuuli	73.0000	18	did not advance	
19	Bulgaria	Aleksandra Atanasova; Anthea Chernookova	72.8000	19	did not advance	
20	Lithuania	Fausta Abramavičiūtė; Goda Vaitekūnaitė	70.4667	20	did not advance	
