= Artistic swimming at the 2020 European Aquatics Championships – Solo free routine =

Competitive artistic swimming event

Solo free routine at the 2020 European Aquatics Championships
- Venue: Danube Arena
- Dates: 10 May 2021 (preliminary); 12 May 2021 (final)
- Competitors: 18 from 18 nations
- Winning points: 96.4333

Medalists
gold medal	Varvara Subbotina	Russia
silver medal	Marta Fiedina	Ukraine
bronze medal	Evangelia Platanioti	Greece

The Solo free routine competition of the 2020 European Aquatics Championships was held on 10 and 12 May 2021.

== Results ==
The preliminary round was held on 10 May at 09:00. The final was started on 12 May at 09:00.

Green denotes finalists

Rank	Swimmer	Nationality	Preliminary		Final	
Rank	Swimmer	Nationality	Points	Rank	Points	Rank
1st place, gold medalist(s)	Varvara Subbotina	Russia	95.6000	1	96.4333	1
2nd place, silver medalist(s)	Marta Fiedina	Ukraine	92.7667	2	93.7000	2
3rd place, bronze medalist(s)	Evangelia Platanioti	Greece	89.9667	3	90.8000	3
4	Vasilina Khandoshka	Belarus	87.5000	5	90.2333	4
5	Vasiliki Alexandri	Austria	87.9667	4	88.8667	5
6	Kate Shortman	Great Britain	85.2333	8	86.0000	6
7	Mireia Hernández	Spain	85.9000	6	85.7333	7
8	Lara Mechnig	Liechtenstein	83.4667	9	84.7333	8
9	Marta Murru	Italy	85.6333	7	84.5333	9
10	Polina Prikazchikova	Israel	80.9667	10	81.9333	10
11	Ilona Fahrni	Switzerland	80.3000	11	81.5333	11
12	Nada Daabousová	Slovakia	80.0667	12	80.4333	12
13	Jasmine Verbena	San Marino	78.8333	13	did not advance	
14	Alžběta Dufková	Czech Republic	77.6333	14	did not advance	
15	Klara Šilobodec	Croatia	75.3667	15	did not advance	
16	Aleksandra Atanasova	Bulgaria	75.3333	16	did not advance	
17	Clara Ternström	Sweden	73.3667	17	did not advance	
18	Pinja Kekki	Finland	72.6667	18	did not advance	
