= Synchronised swimming at the 2018 European Aquatics Championships – Solo technical routine =

Solo technical routine at the 2018 European Aquatics Championships
- Venue: Scotstoun Sports Campus
- Dates: 6 August
- Competitors: 17 from 17 nations
- Winning points: 93.4816

Medalists
| gold medal | Svetlana Kolesnichenko | Russia |
| silver medal | Yelyzaveta Yakhno | Ukraine |
| bronze medal | Linda Cerruti | Italy |

The Solo technical routine competition of the 2018 European Aquatics Championships was held on 6 August 2018.

== Results ==
The final was held at 09:00.

| Rank | Swimmers | Nationality | Points |
|---|---|---|---|
| 1st place, gold medalist(s) | Svetlana Kolesnichenko | Russia | 93.4816 |
| 2nd place, silver medalist(s) | Yelyzaveta Yakhno | Ukraine | 91.3517 |
| 3rd place, bronze medalist(s) | Linda Cerruti | Italy | 90.2282 |
| 4 | Evangelia Platanioti | Greece | 87.5937 |
| 5 | Irene Jimeno Martínez | Spain | 87.5562 |
| 6 | Vasiliki Alexandri | Austria | 85.6352 |
| 7 | Vasilina Khandoshka | Belarus | 84.9228 |
| 8 | Kate Shortman | Great Britain | 82.7030 |
| 9 | Lara Mechnig | Liechtenstein | 81.1587 |
| 10 | Marlene Bojer | Germany | 79.9606 |
| 11 | Vivienne Koch | Switzerland | 79.9221 |
| 12 | Maureen Jenkins | France | 79.5804 |
| 13 | Nada Daabousová | Slovakia | 79.1827 |
| 14 | Szofi Kiss | Hungary | 76.4918 |
| 15 | Alžběta Dufková | Czech Republic | 74.5067 |
| 16 | Swietłana Szczepańska | Poland | 72.7499 |
| 17 | Hristina Damyanova | Bulgaria | 72.0210 |
