= Artistic swimming at the 2020 European Aquatics Championships – Solo technical routine =

Solo technical routine at the 2020 European Aquatics Championships
- Venue: Danube Arena
- Dates: 11 May 2021
- Competitors: 15 from 15 nations
- Winning points: 91.8445

Medalists
gold medal	Marta Fiedina	Ukraine
silver medal	Evangelia Platanioti	Greece
bronze medal	Vasilina Khandoshka	Belarus

The Solo technical routine competition of the 2020 European Aquatics Championships was held on 11 May 2021.

== Results ==
The final was held at 16:00.

Rank	Swimmers	Nationality	Points
1st place, gold medalist(s)	Marta Fiedina	Ukraine	91.8445
2nd place, silver medalist(s)	Evangelia Platanioti	Greece	89.2897
3rd place, bronze medalist(s)	Vasilina Khandoshka	Belarus	87.7173
4	Vasiliki Alexandri	Austria	87.0872
5	Lara Mechnig	Liechtenstein	83.4478
6	Ilona Fahrni	Switzerland	79.2455
7	Nada Daabousová	Slovakia	78.0825
8	Marta Murru	Italy	76.5767
9	Jasmine Zonzini	San Marino	76.1201
10	Alžběta Dufková	Czech Republic	75.7988
11	Aleksandra Atanasova	Bulgaria	74.3189
12	Clara Ternström	Sweden	72.9615
13	Ariel Nassee	Israel	72.1890
14	Pinja Kekki	Finland	70.7166
15	Antonija Huljev	Croatia	67.0331
