= Synchronised swimming at the 2009 World Aquatics Championships – Solo technical routine =

Following are the results of the solo technical routine synchronised swimming competition at the 2009 World Aquatics Championships held in Rome, Italy from July 17 to August 2, 2009.

== Results ==
Green denotes finalists

Rank	Diver	Nationality	Preliminary		Final	
Rank	Diver	Nationality	Points	Rank	Points	Rank
1st place, gold medalist(s)	Natalia Ishchenko	Russia	98.667	1	98.667	1
2nd place, silver medalist(s)	Gemma Mengual	Spain	97.834	2	97.833	2
3rd place, bronze medalist(s)	Marie-Pier Boudreau Gagnon	Canada	95.500	3	96.000	3
4	Beatrice Adelizzi	Italy	93.500	4	94.667	4
5	Yumi Adachi	Japan	92.333	6	93.334	5
6	Daria Iushko	Ukraine	92.834	5	93.167	6
7	Despoina Solomou	Greece	90.500	7	90.333	7
8	Jenna Randall	Great Britain	89.500	8	90.166	8
9	Soňa Bernardová	Czech Republic	88.666	9	88.667	9
10	Anna Kulkina	Kazakhstan	87.000	10	87.500	10
11	Stephanie Jost	Switzerland	86.333	12	87.167	11
12	Giovana Stephan	Brazil	86.500	11	86.500	12
13	Nadine Brandl	Austria	85.833	13		
14	Park Hyunsun	South Korea	84.833	14		
15	Melanie Zillich	Germany	79.833	15		
16	Kalina Yordanova	Bulgaria	79.333	16		
17	Julieta Andrea Diaz	Argentina	78.500	17		
18	Grisel Tendero Llada	Cuba	78.334	18		
19	Anastasiya Ruzmetova	Uzbekistan	78.166	19		
20	Greisy Gomez	Venezuela	77.833	20		
21	Nadezhda Gómez	Costa Rica	74.833	21		
22	Devah Leenheer	Aruba	73.834	22		
23	Lee Renyi Gayle Esther	Singapore	73.667	23		
24	Adela Amanda Nirmala	Indonesia	72.334	24		
25	Kirstin Anderson	New Zealand	71.500	25		
26	Au Ieong Sin Ieng	Macau	70.666	26		
27	Yew Li Cheng	Australia	70.500	27		
28	Margarita Ghazaryan	Armenia	62.000	28		
