= Synchronised swimming at the 2018 European Aquatics Championships – Duet technical routine =

Duet technical routine at the 2018 European Aquatics Championships
- Venue: Scotstoun Sports Campus
- Dates: 3 August
- Competitors: 38 from 19 nations
- Teams: 19
- Winning points: 95.1035

Medalists
gold medal	Svetlana Kolesnichenko; Varvara Subbotina	Russia
silver medal	Anastasiya Savchuk; Yelyzaveta Yakhno	Ukraine
bronze medal	Linda Cerruti; Costanza Ferro	Italy

The Duet technical routine competition of the 2018 European Aquatics Championships was held on 3 August 2018.

== Results ==
The final was held at 13:00.

Rank	Nation	Swimmers	Points
1st place, gold medalist(s)	Russia	Svetlana Kolesnichenko; Varvara Subbotina	95.1035
2nd place, silver medalist(s)	Ukraine	Anastasiya Savchuk; Yelyzaveta Yakhno	92.6188
3rd place, bronze medalist(s)	Italy	Linda Cerruti; Costanza Ferro	89.7519
4	Spain	Paula Ramírez; Sara Saldaña	89.5215
5	Austria	Anna-Maria Alexandri; Eirini-Marina Alexandri	86.2548
6	Greece	Evangelia Papazoglou; Evangelia Platanioti	85.3943
7	France	Charlotte Tremble; Laura Tremble	85.0770
8	Netherlands	Bregje de Brouwer; Noortje de Brouwer	83.7597
9	Belarus	Iryna Limanouskaya; Veronika Yesipovich	82.7553
10	Great Britain	Kate Shortman; Isabelle Thorpe	80.2820
11	Switzerland	Vivienne Koch; Noemi Peschl	79.1306
12	Germany	Marlene Bojer; Daniela Reinhardt	78.3425
13	Israel	Eden Blecher; Yael Polka	75.9580
14	Liechtenstein	Lara Mechnig; Marluce Schierscher	75.5990
15	Slovakia	Nada Daabousová; Diana Miškechová	75.2948
16	Turkey	Defne Bakırcı; Mısra Gündeş	74.6296
17	Portugal	Maria Gonçalves; Cheila Vieira	73.1501
18	Bulgaria	Aleksandra Atanasova; Dalia Penkova	70.8170
19	Serbia	Nevena Dimitrijević; Jelena Kontić	70.5486
