= Synchronised swimming at the 2009 World Aquatics Championships – Solo free routine =

== Results ==
Green denotes finalists

| Rank | Diver | Nationality | Preliminary | | Final | |
| Rank | Diver | Nationality | Points | Rank | Points | Rank |
|---|---|---|---|---|---|---|
| 1st place, gold medalist(s) | Natalia Ishchenko | Russia | 98.500 | 1 | 98.833 | 1 |
| 2nd place, silver medalist(s) | Gemma Mengual | Spain | 98.000 | 2 | 98.333 | 2 |
| 3rd place, bronze medalist(s) | Beatrice Adelizzi | Italy | 94.667 | 3 | 95.500 | 3 |
| 4 | Chloé Isaac | Canada | 94.334 | 4 | 95.000 | 4 |
| 5 | Yumi Adachi | Japan | 92.667 | 5 | 93.167 | 5 |
| 6 | Lolita Ananasova | Ukraine | 91.167 | 6 | 92.500 | 6 |
| 7 | Chloé Willhelm | France | 90.166 | 8 | 91.500 | 7 |
| 8 | Natalia Anthopoulou | Greece | 90.666 | 7 | 90.834 | 8 |
| 9 | Jenna Randall | Great Britain | 88.833 | 10 | 89.167 | 9 |
| 10 | Wang Ok-Gyong | North Korea | 89.000 | 9 | 88.666 | 10 |
| 11 | Soňa Bernardová | Czech Republic | 88.166 | 11 | 87.833 | 11 |
| 12 | Park Hyunsun | South Korea | 87.500 | 12 | 87.666 | 12 |
| 13 | Nadine Brandl | Austria | 86.500 | 13 | | |
| 14 | Pamela Fischer | Switzerland | 85.500 | 14 | | |
| 15 | Giovana Stephan | Brazil | 84.833 | 15 | | |
| 16 | Melanie Zillich | Germany | 80.000 | 16 | | |
| 16 | Kalina Yordanova | Bulgaria | 80.000 | 16 | | |
| 18 | Grisel Tendero Llada | Cuba | 79.167 | 18 | | |
| 19 | Anastasiya Ruzmetova | Uzbekistan | 78.334 | 19 | | |
| 20 | Margareta Jakovac | Croatia | 77.667 | 20 | | |
| 21 | Julieta Andrea Diaz | Argentina | 77.500 | 21 | | |
| 22 | Greisy Gomez | Venezuela | 76.167 | 22 | | |
| 23 | Devah Leenheer | Aruba | 76.166 | 23 | | |
| 24 | Lee Renyi Gayle Esther | Singapore | 75.834 | 24 | | |
| 24 | Tarren Otte | Australia | 75.834 | 24 | | |
| 26 | Violeta Mitinian | Costa Rica | 75.500 | 26 | | |
| 27 | Kirstin Anderson | New Zealand | 73.167 | 27 | | |
| 28 | Shelvy Melowa | Indonesia | 70.166 | 28 | | |
| 29 | Lok Ka Man | Macau | 69.666 | 29 | | |
| 30 | Margarita Ghazaryan | Armenia | 58.666 | 30 | | |
