= Synchronised swimming at the 2018 European Aquatics Championships – Duet free routine =

Duet free routine at the 2018 European Aquatics Championships
- Venue: Scotstoun Sports Campus
- Dates: 4 August (preliminary); 7 August (final)
- Competitors: 38 from 19 nations
- Teams: 19
- Winning points: 96.7000

Medalists
gold medal	Svetlana Kolesnichenko; Varvara Subbotina	Russia
silver medal	Anastasiya Savchuk; Yelyzaveta Yakhno	Ukraine
bronze medal	Linda Cerruti; Costanza Ferro	Italy

The Duet free routine competition of the 2018 European Aquatics Championships was held on 4 and 7 August 2018.

== Results ==
The preliminary round was held on 4 August at 09:00. The final was held on 7 August at 09:00.

Green denotes finalists

Rank	Nation	Swimmers	Preliminary		Final	
Rank	Nation	Swimmers	Points	Rank	Points	Rank
1st place, gold medalist(s)	Russia	Svetlana Kolesnichenko; Varvara Subbotina	96.0333	1	96.7000	1
2nd place, silver medalist(s)	Ukraine	Anastasiya Savchuk; Yelyzaveta Yakhno	93.3000	2	93.4000	2
3rd place, bronze medalist(s)	Italy	Linda Cerruti; Costanza Ferro	91.1667	3	92.1333	3
4	Spain	Paula Ramírez; Sara Saldaña	89.1667	4	90.0667	4
5	Greece	Evangelia Papazoglou; Evangelia Platanioti	87.1000	5	89.1667	5
6	France	Maureen Jenkins; Eve Planeix	86.8333	6	87.2333	6
7	Austria	Anna-Maria Alexandri; Eirini-Marina Alexandri	86.5667	7	87.1667	7
8	Netherlands	Bregje de Brouwer; Noortje de Brouwer	84.5000	8	85.2000	8
9	Belarus	Iryna Limanouskaya; Veronika Yesipovich	82.9667	9	83.9333	9
10	Switzerland	Vivienne Koch; Noemi Peschl	82.0667	10	82.9000	10
11	Great Britain	Kate Shortman; Isabelle Thorpe	80.9667	11	82.0000	11
12	Germany	Marlene Bojer; Daniela Reinhardt	80.3000	12	80.6000	12
13	Israel	Eden Blecher; Yael Polka	80.2333	13	did not advance	
14	Liechtenstein	Lara Mechnig; Marluce Schierscher	78.2333	14	did not advance	
15	Slovakia	Nada Daabousová; Diana Miškechová	77.9333	15	did not advance	
16	Turkey	Defne Bakırcı; Mısra Gündeş	75.5333	16	did not advance	
17	Serbia	Nevena Dimitrijević; Jelena Kontić	74.4333	17	did not advance	
18	Portugal	Maria Gonçalves; Cheila Vieira	73.6667	18	did not advance	
19	Bulgaria	Aleksandra Atanasova; Dalia Penkova	73.2333	19	did not advance	
