= Schierscher =

Schierscher is a surname. Notable people with the surname include:

- Josef Schierscher (1884–1974), Mayor of Schaan
- Georg Schierscher (born 1942), Liechtenstein mathematician and politician
- Manuela Haldner-Schierscher (born 1971), Liechtenstein politician
- Marluce Schierscher (born 1998), Liechtenstein synchronized swimmer
