= Liechtenstein at the 2013 World Aquatics Championships =

- Flag of Liechtenstein
- FINA code: LIE
- National federation: Swimming Association of Liechtenstein

in Barcelona, Spain
- Competitors: 2 in 1 sports
- Medals Ranked -th: Gold 0 Silver 0 Bronze 0 Total 0

World Aquatics Championships appearances
- 2011; 2013; 2015; 2017; 2019; 2022; 2023; 2024

Liechtenstein competed at the 2013 World Aquatics Championships in Barcelona, Spain from 19 July to 4 August 2013.

== Swimming ==
Liechtensteiner swimmers achieved qualifying standards in the following events (up to a maximum of 2 swimmers in each event at the A-standard entry time, and 1 at the B-standard):

Men

Athlete	Event	Heat		Semifinal		Final	
Athlete	Event	Time	Rank	Time	Rank	Time	Rank
Christoph Meier	200 m individual medley	2:05.08 NR	43	did not advance			
Christoph Meier	400 m individual medley	4:23.90 NR	25	—		did not advance	

Women

Athlete	Event	Heat		Semifinal		Final	
Athlete	Event	Time	Rank	Time	Rank	Time	Rank
Julia Hassler	200 m freestyle	2:02.76	31	did not advance			
Julia Hassler	400 m freestyle	4:14.68	21	—		did not advance	
Julia Hassler	800 m freestyle	8:40.89	21	—		did not advance	
Julia Hassler	1500 m freestyle	16:33.61	16	—		did not advance	
