= Liechtenstein at the 2017 World Aquatics Championships =

- Flag of Liechtenstein
- FINA code: LIE
- National federation: Swimming Association of Liechtenstein

in Budapest, Hungary
- Competitors: 4 in 2 sports
- Medals: Gold 0 Silver 0 Bronze 0 Total 0

World Aquatics Championships appearances
- 2011; 2013; 2015; 2017; 2019; 2022; 2023; 2024

Liechtenstein competed at the 2017 World Aquatics Championships in Budapest, Hungary from 14 July to 30 July, 2017.

== Swimming ==
Liechtensteinian swimmers have achieved qualifying standards in the following events (up to a maximum of 2 swimmers in each event at the A-standard entry time, and 1 at the B-standard):

Athlete	Event	Heat		Semifinal		Final	
Athlete	Event	Time	Rank	Time	Rank	Time	Rank
Christoph Meier	Men's 200 m individual medley	2:03.15 NR	27	did not advance			
Christoph Meier	Men's 400 m individual medley	4:22.29	26	—		did not advance	
Julia Hassler	Women's 200 m freestyle	DNS		did not advance			
Julia Hassler	Women's 400 m freestyle	4:17.05	20	—		did not advance	
Julia Hassler	Women's 800 m freestyle	8:34.13 NR	10	—		did not advance	
Julia Hassler	Women's 1500 m freestyle	16:19.16 NR	7 Q	—		16:14.86 NR	7

== Synchronized swimming ==
Liechtenstein's synchronized swimming team consisted of 2 athletes (2 female).

Women

Athlete	Event	Preliminaries		Final	
Athlete	Event	Points	Rank	Points	Rank
Lara Mechnig	Solo technical routine	80.3468	11 Q	81.8521	11
Lara Mechnig	Solo free routine	82.8667	13	did not advance	
Lara Mechnig; Marluce Schierscher	Duet technical routine	74.9225	26	did not advance	
Lara Mechnig; Marluce Schierscher	Duet free routine	76.5000	25	did not advance	
