= Liechtenstein at the 2024 World Aquatics Championships =

- Flag of Liechtenstein
- FINA code: LIE
- National federation: Swimming Association of Liechtenstein

in Doha, Qatar
- Competitors: 2 in 1 sport

World Aquatics Championships appearances
- 2011; 2013; 2015; 2017; 2019; 2022; 2023; 2024

Liechtenstein competed at the 2024 World Aquatics Championships in Doha, Qatar from 2 to 18 February.

== Athletes by discipline ==
Liechtenstein sent 2 athletes to compete in a single disciplines:

Sport	Men	Women	Total
Artistic swimming	0	2	2
Total	0	2	2

== Artistic swimming ==
Liechtenstein entered 2 artistic swimmers.

Women

Athlete	Event	Preliminaries		Final	
Athlete	Event	Points	Rank	Points	Rank
Noemi Büchel; Leila Marxer	Duet technical routine	200.9201	26	did not advance	
Noemi Büchel; Leila Marxer	Duet free routine	189.4106	13	did not advance	
