= Synchronised swimming at the 2012 European Aquatics Championships – Solo routine =

The Solo routine competition of the synchronised swimming at the 2012 European Aquatics Championships was held on May 23 with the technical and May 24 with the free routine preliminaries. The final was held on May 26.

== Medalists ==
| Gold | Silver | Bronze |
|---|---|---|
| Natalia Ishchenko; Russia | Andrea Fuentes; Spain | Lolita Ananasova; Ukraine |

== Results ==
The preliminary rounds were held at 12:00 local time on May 23–24. The final was held at 12:00 on May 26.

Green denotes finalists

| Rank | Swimmer | Nationality | Technical | | Free | | Final | |
| Rank | Swimmer | Nationality | Points | Rank | Points | Rank | Points | Rank |
|---|---|---|---|---|---|---|---|---|
| 1st place, gold medalist(s) | Natalia Ishchenko | Russia | 97.400 | 1 | 97.660 | 1 | 97.810 | 1 |
| 2nd place, silver medalist(s) | Andrea Fuentes | Spain | 94.700 | 2 | 95.730 | 2 | 95.900 | 2 |
| 3rd place, bronze medalist(s) | Lolita Ananasova | Ukraine | 90.600 | 3 | 91.480 | 3 | 92.250 | 3 |
| 4 | Despoina Solomou | Greece | 89.600 | 4 | 89.750 | 4 | 89.620 | 4 |
| 5 | Linda Cerruti | Italy | 87.800 | 5 | 88.340 | 5 | 87.750 | 5 |
| 6 | Nadine Brandl | Austria | 84.100 | 6 | 84.200 | 6 | 84.570 | 6 |
| 7 | Pamela Fischer | Switzerland | 83.800 | 7 | 83.560 | 7 | 83.970 | 7 |
| 8 | Margot de Graaf | Netherlands | 82.800 | 8 | 82.850 | 8 | 82.100 | 8 |
| 9 | Kyra Feissner | Germany | 80.300 | 9 | 80.420 | 9 | 80.340 | 9 |
| 10 | Iryna Limanouskaya | Belarus | 78.800 | 10 | 77.650 | 10 | 77.290 | 10 |
| 11 | Kalina Yordanova | Bulgaria | 76.900 | 11 | 77.090 | 11 | 76.710 | 11 |
| 12 | Tugce Tanis | Turkey | 73.900 | 12 | 74.040 | 12 | 73.770 | 12 |
| 13 | Malin Gerdin | Sweden | 73.600 | 13 | 73.890 | 13 | | |
| 14 | Jasmin Gronman | Finland | 71.500 | 14 | 70.880 | 14 | | |
| 15 | Sandra Kaczmarek | Poland | 70.100 | 15 | 68.890 | 15 | | |
