= Liechtenstein at the 2023 World Aquatics Championships =

- Flag of Liechtenstein
- FINA code: LIE
- National federation: Swimming Association of Liechtenstein

in Fukuoka, Japan
- Competitors: 2 in 1 sport
- Medals: Gold 0 Silver 0 Bronze 0 Total 0

World Aquatics Championships appearances
- 2011; 2013; 2015; 2017; 2019; 2022; 2023; 2024

Liechtenstein competed at the 2023 World Aquatics Championships in Fukuoka, Japan from 14 to 30 July.

== Artistic swimming ==
Liechtenstein entered 2 artistic swimmers.

Women

Athlete	Event	Preliminaries		Final	
Athlete	Event	Points	Rank	Points	Rank
Noemi Büchel; Leila Marxer	Duet technical routine	204.5567	14	did not advance	
Noemi Büchel; Leila Marxer	Duet free routine	168.4124	14	did not advance	
