= Liechtenstein at the 2011 World Aquatics Championships =

- Flag of Liechtenstein
- FINA code: LIE
- National federation: Swimming Association of Liechtenstein

in Shanghai, China
- Competitors: 1 in 1 sports
- Medals Ranked -th: Gold 0 Silver 0 Bronze 0 Total 0

World Aquatics Championships appearances
- 2011; 2013; 2015; 2017; 2019; 2022; 2023; 2024

Liechtenstein competed at the 2011 World Aquatics Championships in Shanghai, China between July 16 and 31, 2011.

== Swimming ==
Liechtenstein qualified 1 swimmer.

Women

Athlete	Event	Heats		Semifinals		Final	
Athlete	Event	Time	Rank	Time	Rank	Time	Rank
Julia Hassler	Women's 400m Freestyle	4:17.61	25			did not advance	
Julia Hassler	Women's 800m Freestyle	8:46.00	24			did not advance	
Julia Hassler	Women's 1500m Freestyle	16:34.74	18			did not advance	
