= Liechtenstein at the 2015 World Aquatics Championships =

- Flag of Liechtenstein
- FINA code: LIE
- National federation: Swimming Association of Liechtenstein

in Kazan, Russia
- Competitors: 2 in 1 sport
- Medals: Gold 0 Silver 0 Bronze 0 Total 0

World Aquatics Championships appearances
- 2011; 2013; 2015; 2017; 2019; 2022; 2023; 2024

Liechtenstein competed at the 2015 World Aquatics Championships in Kazan, Russia from 24 July to 9 August 2015.

== Swimming ==
Liechtensteiner swimmers have achieved qualifying standards in the following events (up to a maximum of 2 swimmers in each event at the A-standard entry time, and 1 at the B-standard):

Men

Athlete	Event	Heat		Semifinal		Final	
Athlete	Event	Time	Rank	Time	Rank	Time	Rank
Christoph Meier	200 m breaststroke	2:17.07	41	did not advance			
Christoph Meier	200 m individual medley	2:04.01	30	did not advance			
Christoph Meier	400 m individual medley	4:23.57	30	—		did not advance	

Women

Athlete	Event	Heat		Semifinal		Final	
Athlete	Event	Time	Rank	Time	Rank	Time	Rank
Julia Hassler	200 m freestyle	2:03.08	43	did not advance			
Julia Hassler	400 m freestyle	4:14.51	23	—		did not advance	
Julia Hassler	800 m freestyle	8:39.12	18	—		did not advance	
Julia Hassler	1500 m freestyle	16:32.04	16	—		did not advance	
