= Artistic swimming at the 2026 European Aquatics Championships – Women's solo free routine =

Women's solo free routine at the 2026 European Aquatics Championships
- Venue: Paris Aquatic Centre
- Dates: 1 August (preliminary); 3 August (final)
- Competitors: 14 from 14 nations
- Winning points: 292.3887

Medalists
gold medal	Vasilina Khandoshka
silver medal	Klara Bleyer	Germany
bronze medal	Iris Tió	Spain

The Women's solo free routine competition at the 2026 European Aquatics Championships was held on 1 and 3 August 2026.

== Results ==
The preliminary round was started on 1 August at 09:00. The final was started on 3 August at 09:00.

Green denotes finalists

Rank	Swimmer	Nationality	Preliminary		Final	
Rank	Swimmer	Nationality	Points	Rank	Points	Rank
1st place, gold medalist(s)	Vasilina Khandoshka	Neutral Athletes A	287.3999	1	292.3887	1
2nd place, silver medalist(s)	Klara Bleyer	Germany	271.6687	3	289.2463	2
3rd place, bronze medalist(s)	Iris Tió	Spain	276.4849	2	284.5550	3
4	Enrica Piccoli	Italy	270.9413	4	270.0475	4
5	Marloes Steenbeek	Netherlands	265.1775	6	269.2087	5
6	Valeriia Plekhanova	Neutral Athletes B	268.9637	5	268.9412	6
7	Vasiliki Alexandri	Greece	246.5013	8	267.4188	7
8	Maria Alavidze	Georgia	254.8225	7	263.4851	8
9	Zea Montfort	Malta	170.7550	12	230.2974	9
10	Maria Valeva	Bulgaria	217.4950	9	218.9025	10
11	Barbora Kalvodová	Czechia	209.4349	10	217.4288	11
12	Iiris-Maria Nurmi	Finland	187.7576	11	192.0401	12
13	Marilyn De Decker	Belgium	168.7087	13	Did not advance	
14	Selin Hürmeriç	Turkey	130.0075	14	Did not advance	
