= Liechtenstein at the 2019 World Aquatics Championships =

- Flag of Liechtenstein
- FINA code: LIE
- National federation: Swimming Association of Liechtenstein

in Gwangju, South Korea
- Medals: Gold 0 Silver 0 Bronze 0 Total 0

World Aquatics Championships appearances
- 2011; 2013; 2015; 2017; 2019; 2022; 2023; 2024

Liechtenstein competed at the 2019 World Aquatics Championships in Gwangju, South Korea from 12 to 28 July.

== Artistic swimming ==
Liechtenstein's artistic swimming team consisted of 2 athletes (2 female).

Women

Athlete	Event	Preliminaries		Final	
Athlete	Event	Points	Rank	Points	Rank
Lara Mechnig	Solo technical routine	81.3678	11 Q	81.7811	11
Lara Mechnig	Solo free routine	82.4000	13	did not advance	
Lara Mechnig; Marluce Schierscher	Duet technical routine	78.1800	22	did not advance	
Lara Mechnig; Marluce Schierscher	Duet free routine	78.9000	21	did not advance	

== Swimming ==
Liechtenstein entered two swimmers.

Men

Athlete	Event	Heat		Semifinal		Final	
Athlete	Event	Time	Rank	Time	Rank	Time	Rank
Christoph Meier	200 m breaststroke	2:15.48	38	did not advance			
Christoph Meier	200 m individual medley	2:02.68	33	did not advance			
Christoph Meier	400 m individual medley	4:22.56	22	—		did not advance	

Women

Athlete	Event	Heat		Semifinal		Final	
Athlete	Event	Time	Rank	Time	Rank	Time	Rank
Julia Hassler	200 m freestyle	2:00.99	26	did not advance			
Julia Hassler	400 m freestyle	4:13.91	21	—		did not advance	
Julia Hassler	800 m freestyle	8:34.91	13	—		did not advance	
Julia Hassler	1500 m freestyle	16:25.59	14	—		did not advance	
