= Artistic swimming at the 2026 European Aquatics Championships – Women's solo technical routine =

Women's solo technical routine at the 2026 European Aquatics Championships
- Venue: Paris Aquatic Centre
- Dates: 4 August
- Competitors: 16 from 16 nations
- Winning points: 263.6250

Medalists
gold medal	Iris Tió	Spain
silver medal	Vasilina Khandoshka
bronze medal	Klara Bleyer	Germany

The Women's solo technical routine competition at the 2026 European Aquatics Championships was held on 4 August 2026.

== Results ==
The final was started at 09:00.

Rank	Swimmer	Nationality	Points
1st place, gold medalist(s)	Iris Tió	Spain	263.6250
2nd place, silver medalist(s)	Vasilina Khandoshka	Neutral Athletes A	263.3817
3rd place, bronze medalist(s)	Klara Bleyer	Germany	258.0400
4	Enrica Piccoli	Italy	246.8250
5	Vasiliki Alexandri	Greece	243.8917
6	Marloes Steenbeek	Netherlands	243.4267
7	Valeriia Plekhanova	Neutral Athletes B	242.2349
8	Maria Alavidze	Georgia	240.0183
9	Selin Hürmeriç	Turkey	235.0550
10	Žofia Strapeková	Slovakia	230.1000
11	Zea Montfort	Malta	219.6167
12	Loya Cenkci	Great Britain	219.2233
13	Mari Moilala	Finland	212.3724
14	Raya Furnadzhieva	Bulgaria	198.8783
15	Diana Čípová	Czechia	196.6033
16	Fien Sandra	Belgium	189.3333
