= Natalia Ishchenko =

Russian synchronized swimmer

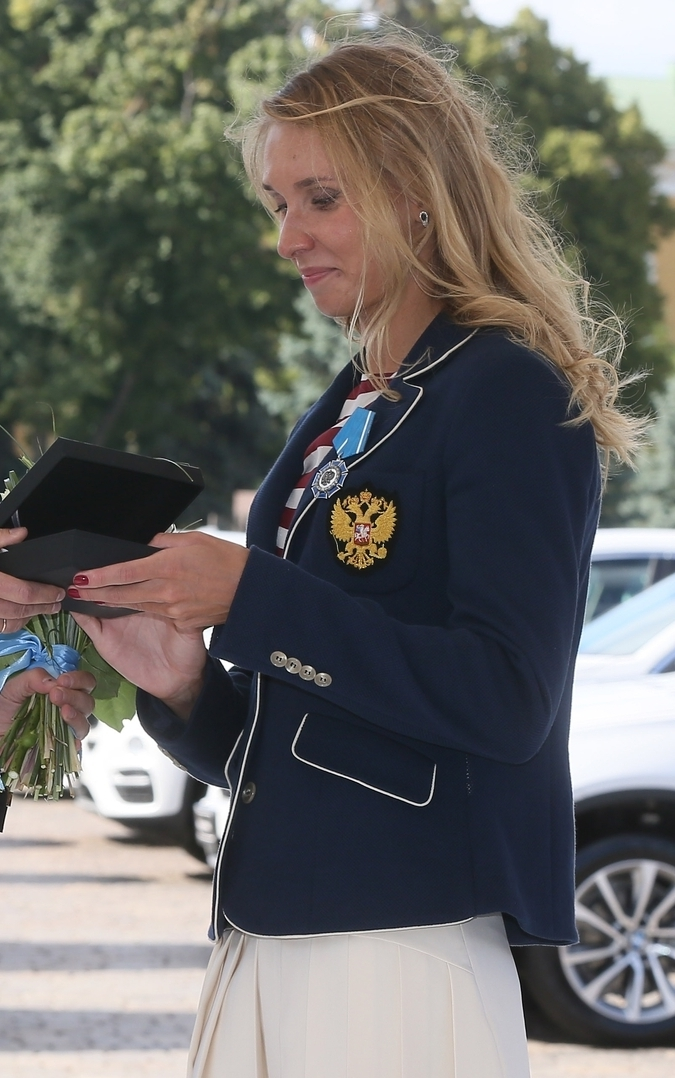
- Ishchenko in 2016

Personal information
- Full name: Nataliya Sergeyevna Ishchenko
- Nationality: Russian
- Born: 8 April 1986 (age 40) Smolensk, Russian SFSR, Soviet Union
- Height: 1.77 m (5 ft 10 in)
- Weight: 56 kg (123 lb)

Sport
- Sport: Swimming
- Strokes: Synchronized swimming
- Club: Dynamo Moscow
- Coach: Tatiana Danchenko (Duet); Tatyana Pokrovskaya (Team)
Medal record
Event	1st	2nd	3rd
Olympic Games	5	0	0
World Championships	19	2	0
European Championships	12	2	0
Total	36	4	0
Olympic Games
Gold medal – first place	2016 Rio de Janeiro	Duet
Gold medal – first place	2016 Rio de Janeiro	Team
Gold medal – first place	2012 London	Duet
Gold medal – first place	2012 London	Team
Gold medal – first place	2008 Beijing	Team
World Championships
Gold medal – first place	2005 Montreal	Combo routine
Gold medal – first place	2005 Montreal	Team
Gold medal – first place	2007 Melbourne	Combo routine
Gold medal – first place	2007 Melbourne	Solo technical routine
Gold medal – first place	2007 Melbourne	Team technical routine
Gold medal – first place	2007 Melbourne	Team free routine
Gold medal – first place	2009 Rome	Solo technical routine
Gold medal – first place	2009 Rome	Solo free routine
Gold medal – first place	2009 Rome	Duet free routine
Gold medal – first place	2009 Rome	Team free routine
Gold medal – first place	2011 Shanghai	Solo technical routine
Gold medal – first place	2011 Shanghai	Duet technical routine
Gold medal – first place	2011 Shanghai	Solo free routine
Gold medal – first place	2011 Shanghai	Combo routine
Gold medal – first place	2011 Shanghai	Duet free routine
Gold medal – first place	2011 Shanghai	Team free routine
Gold medal – first place	2015 Kazan	Solo free routine
Gold medal – first place	2015 Kazan	Duet technical routine
Gold medal – first place	2015 Kazan	Duet free routine
Silver medal – second place	2005 Montreal	Solo
Silver medal – second place	2007 Melbourne	Solo free routine
European Championships
Gold medal – first place	2006 Budapest	Solo
Gold medal – first place	2006 Budapest	Team
Gold medal – first place	2006 Budapest	Combination
Gold medal – first place	2010 Budapest	Solo
Gold medal – first place	2010 Budapest	Team
Gold medal – first place	2010 Budapest	Duet
Gold medal – first place	2010 Budapest	Combination
Gold medal – first place	2012 Eindhoven	Solo
Gold medal – first place	2012 Eindhoven	Duet
Gold medal – first place	2016 London	Solo free routine
Gold medal – first place	2016 London	Duet free routine
Gold medal – first place	2016 London	Duet technical routine
Silver medal – second place	2004 Madrid	Solo
Silver medal – second place	2008 Eindhoven	Solo

Natalia Sergeyevna Ishchenko (Russian: Наталья Серге́евна Ищенко; born 8 April 1986) is a retired Russian synchronized swimmer, five-times Olympic champion and nineteen-times world champion.

Ishchenko announced her retirement from sports in April 2017. Since November 2017, she has served as Minister of Sports of Kaliningrad Oblast.

== Career ==
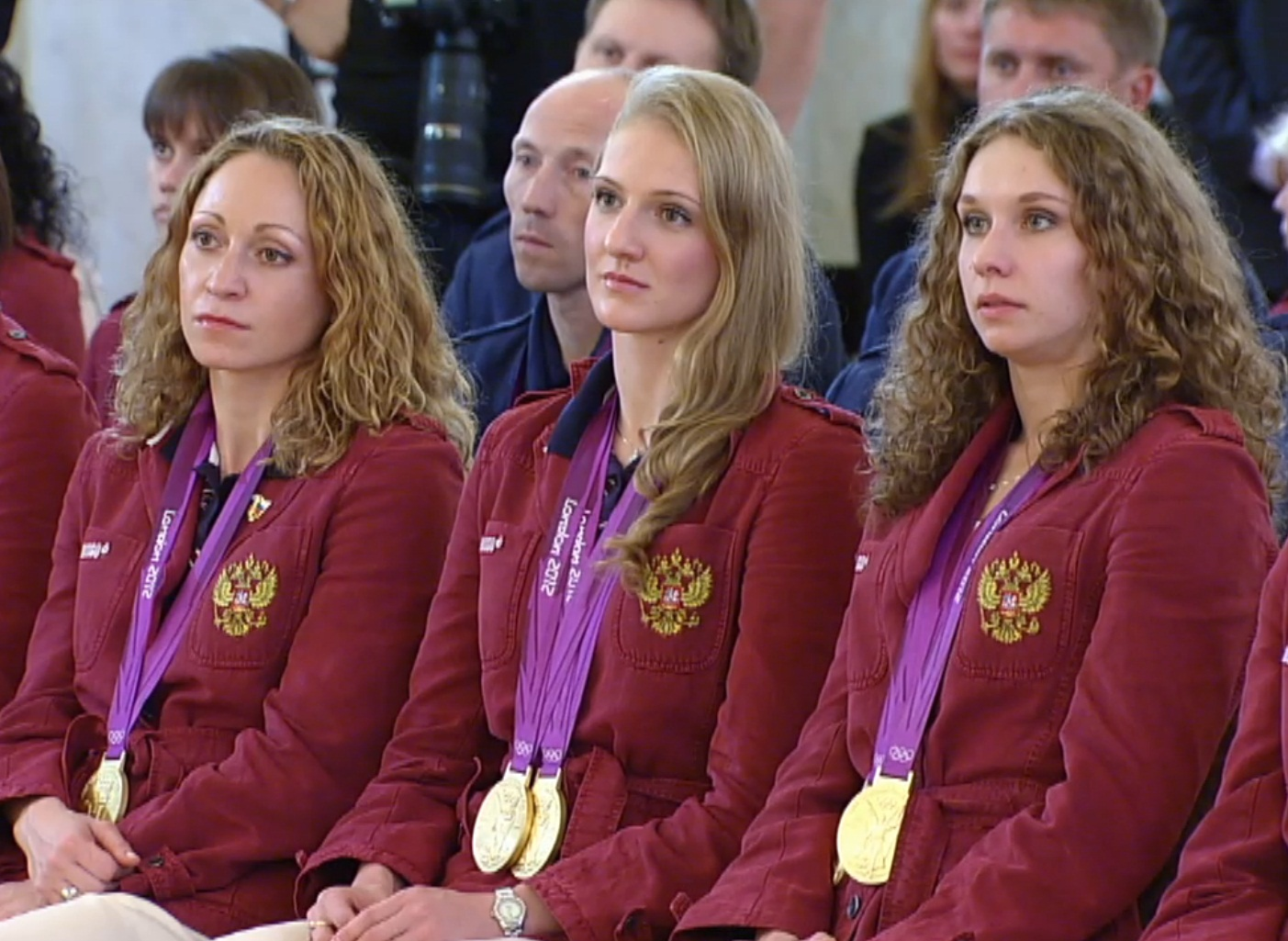
Natalia Ishchenko (right) at a meeting of Russian 2012 Summer Olympics medalists with the Russian President on 16 August 2012

Natalia was a member of the Russian gold medal team in 2008, 2012 and 2016. She also won gold in the women's duet at the 2012 and 2016 Summer Olympics with Svetlana Romashina.

Natalia took a break from the sport in 2013 after giving birth to her son. She returned in 2015, winning both the women's duet and team events at the European Synchro Cup in Haarlemmermeer, qualifying for the 2016 Summer Olympics in Rio de Janeiro.

Awards
Preceded by First award	FINA Synchronized Swimmer of the Year; 2010–2012 (Shared with Romashina in 2011)	Succeeded by (Russia) Svetlana Romashina
