= Artistic swimming at the 2024 European Aquatics Championships – Team acrobatic routine =

Team acrobatic routine at the 2024 European Aquatics Championships
- Venue: Sports Centre Milan Gale Muškatirović
- Dates: 13 June
- Competitors: 24 from 3 nations
- Winning points: 192.7166

Medalists
gold medal	Klara Bleyer; Amelie Blumenthal Haz; Maria Denisov; Solène Guisard; Daria Martens; Susana Rovner; Frithjof Seidel; Daria Tonn	Germany
silver medal	Maria Alzigkouzi Kominea; Thaleia Dampali; Athina Kamarinopoulou; Zoi Karangelou; Maria Karapanagiotou; Artemi Koutraki; Ifigeneia Krommydaki; Vasiliki Thanou	Greece
bronze medal	Beatrice Andina; Valentina Bisi; Beatrice Esegio; Alessia Macchi; Giorgia Lucia Macino; Marta Murru; Carmen Rocchino; Sophie Tabbiani	Italy

The Team acrobatic routine competition of the 2024 European Aquatics Championships was held on 13 June 2024.

== Results ==
The final was held on 13 June at 17:00.

Rank	Nation	Swimmers	Points
1st place, gold medalist(s)	Germany	Klara Bleyer; Amelie Blumenthal Haz; Maria Denisov; Solène Guisard; Daria Martens; Susana Rovner; Frithjof Seidel; Daria Tonn	192.7166
2nd place, silver medalist(s)	Greece	Maria Alzigkouzi Kominea; Thaleia Dampali; Athina Kamarinopoulou; Zoi Karangelou; Maria Karapanagiotou; Artemi Koutraki; Ifigeneia Krommydaki; Vasiliki Thanou	191.8100
3rd place, bronze medalist(s)	Italy	Beatrice Andina; Valentina Bisi; Beatrice Esegio; Alessia Macchi; Giorgia Lucia Macino; Marta Murru; Carmen Rocchino; Sophie Tabbiani	159.2966
