= Lara Mechnig =

Liechtenstein synchronized swimmer

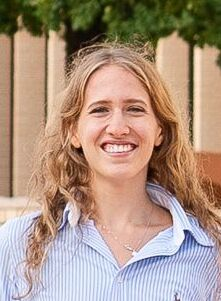
- Mechnig in 2021

Personal information
- Born: 25 February 2000 (age 26)

Sport
- Sport: Swimming
- Strokes: Synchronized swimming

Lara Mechnig (born 25 February 2000) is a synchronized swimmer from Liechtenstein. She competed in the women's duet event at the 2020 Summer Olympics held in Tokyo, Japan. This was also the first time Liechtenstein competed in artistic swimming at the Summer Olympics.

She also represented Liechtenstein at the 2017 World Aquatics Championships in Budapest, Hungary and at the 2019 World Aquatics Championships in Gwangju, South Korea.

== Career ==
In 2015, she represented Liechtenstein at the European Games held in Baku, Azerbaijan. She competed in the women's solo and women's duet competitions. In 2016, she competed in the solo free routine and duet technical routine competitions at the European Aquatics Championships held in London, United Kingdom. At the 2017 World Aquatics Championships, she competed in both the duet technical routine and duet free routine competitions.

Mechnig and Marluce Schierscher finished in 14th place in the duet technical routine at the 2018 European Aquatics Championships. In the duet free routine they finished in 14th place in the preliminary round. In the solo technical routine Mechnig finished in 9th place and in the solo free routine she finished in 10th place.

At the 2019 World Aquatics Championships, she finished in 13th place in the preliminary round in the solo free routine. She finished in 11th place in the solo technical routine. Mechnig and Marluce Schierscher competed in the duet technical routine and duet free routine. In the duet technical routine they finished in 22nd place in the preliminary round and in the duet free routine they finished in 21st place in the preliminary round.

She also competed in the solo technical routine, solo free routine, duet technical routine and duet free routine events at the 2020 European Aquatics Championships held in Budapest, Hungary.
