= Switzerland at the 2017 World Aquatics Championships =

- Flag of Switzerland
- World Aquatics code: SUI
- National federation: Schweizerischer Schwimmverband
- Website: www.fsn.ch

in Budapest, Hungary
- Competitors: 23 in 3 sports
- Medals: Gold 0 Silver 0 Bronze 0 Total 0

World Aquatics Championships appearances
- 1973; 1975; 1978; 1982; 1986; 1991; 1994; 1998; 2001; 2003; 2005; 2007; 2009; 2011; 2013; 2015; 2017; 2019; 2022; 2023; 2024; 2025

Switzerland competed at the 2017 World Aquatics Championships in Budapest, Hungary from 14 July to 30 July.

== Diving ==
Switzerland has entered 6 divers (three male and three female).

Men

Athlete	Event	Preliminaries		Semifinals		Final	
Athlete	Event	Points	Rank	Points	Rank	Points	Rank
Guillaume Dutoit	1 m springboard	346.80	18	—N/a		did not advance	
Jonathan Suckow	1 m springboard	317.30	28	—N/a		did not advance	
Guillaume Dutoit	3 m springboard	407.10	18 Q	405.95	14	did not advance	
Jonathan Suckow	3 m springboard	325.40	41	did not advance			
Guillaume Dutoit; Simon Rieckhoff	3 m synchronized springboard	369.45	14	—N/a		did not advance	

Women

Athlete	Event	Preliminaries		Semifinals		Final	
Athlete	Event	Points	Rank	Points	Rank	Points	Rank
Michelle Heimberg	1 m springboard	252.95	15	—N/a		did not advance	
Jessica-Floriane Favre	3 m springboard	261.15	21	did not advance			
Michelle Heimberg	3 m springboard	253.50	24	did not advance			
Vivian Barth; Jessica-Floriane Favre	3 m synchronized springboard	243.75	15	—N/a		did not advance	

Mixed

Athlete	Event	Final	
Athlete	Event	Points	Rank
Michelle Heimberg; Jonathan Suckow	3 m synchronized springboard	273.00	8

== Swimming ==
Swiss swimmers have achieved qualifying standards in the following events (up to a maximum of 2 swimmers in each event at the A-standard entry time, and 1 at the B-standard):

Athlete	Event	Heat		Semifinal		Final	
Athlete	Event	Time	Rank	Time	Rank	Time	Rank
Jérémy Desplanches	Men's 200 m individual medley	1:57.59	5 Q	1:56.86	4 Q	1:57.50	8
Jérémy Desplanches	Men's 400 m individual medley	4:18.69	15	—N/a		did not advance	
Yannick Käser	Men's 50 m breaststroke	27.84	29	did not advance			
Yannick Käser	Men's 100 m breaststroke	1:00.53 NR	24	did not advance			
Yannick Käser	Men's 200 m breaststroke	2:11.00 NR	=16 Q	2:12.19	16	did not advance	
Nils Liess	Men's 200 m freestyle	1:48.07	30	did not advance			
Nils Liess	Men's 200 m backstroke	2:00.96	29	did not advance			
Nils Liess	Men's 100 m butterfly	53.50	38	did not advance			
Nils Liess	Men's 200 m butterfly	1:57.96	20	did not advance			
Maria Ugolkova	Women's 50 m freestyle	25.47	26	did not advance			
Maria Ugolkova	Women's 100 m freestyle	54.81	20	did not advance			
Maria Ugolkova	Women's 200 m freestyle	1:59.13	18	did not advance			
Maria Ugolkova	Women's 200 m individual medley	2:12.24	12 Q	2:12.25	13	did not advance	
Martina van Berkel	Women's 200 m backstroke	2:14.34	23	did not advance			
Martina van Berkel	Women's 100 m butterfly	1:00.50	27	did not advance			
Martina van Berkel	Women's 200 m butterfly	2:09.34	17 q	2:08.71	12	did not advance	

== Synchronized swimming ==
Switzerland's synchronized swimming team consisted of 12 athletes (12 female).

Women

Athlete	Event	Preliminaries		Final	
Athlete	Event	Points	Rank	Points	Rank
Vivienne Koch	Solo technical routine	80.2948	12 Q	80.2700	12
Vivienne Koch	Solo free routine	82.2000	14	did not advance	
Maxence Bellina; Maria Piffaretti	Duet technical routine	77.0014	22	did not advance	
Maxence Bellina; Maria Piffaretti	Duet free routine	79.7333	22	did not advance	
Maxence Bellina; Christine Fluri; Gladys Jaccard (R); Melisande Jaccard; Vivienne Koch; Joelle Peschl; Noemi Peschl; Maria Piffaretti; Alyssa Thoni (R); Sarina Weibel	Team technical routine	81.0684	13	did not advance	
Maxence Bellina; Christine Fluri; Gladys Jaccard (R); Melisande Jaccard (R); Vivienne Koch; Joelle Peschl; Noemi Peschl; Maria Piffaretti; Alyssa Thoni; Sarina Weibel	Team free routine	81.3667	14	did not advance	
Maxence Bellina; Fanny Eckstein; Christine Fluri; Gladys Jaccard; Melisande Jaccard; Vivienne Koch; Paloma Mello (R); Joelle Peschl; Noemi Peschl; Maria Piffaretti; Alyssa Thoni (R); Sarina Weibel	Free routine combination	81.7333	11 Q	82.0333	11

Legend: (R) = Reserve Athlete
