= Klara Bleyer =

Italian synchronised swimmer (born 2004)

Personal information
- Nationality: German
- Born: 6 May 2004 (age 22)

Sport
- Country: Germany
- Sport: Synchronised swimming
Medal record
Women's artistic swimming
Representing Germany
European Championships
Gold medal – first place	2024 Belgrade	Team technical
Gold medal – first place	2025 Funchal	Solo free
Silver medal – second place	2024 Belgrade	Solo free
Silver medal – second place	2024 Belgrade	Solo technical
Silver medal – second place	2026 Paris	Solo free
Bronze medal – third place	2025 Funchal	Solo technical
Bronze medal – third place	2025 Funchal	Duet free
Bronze medal – third place	2026 Paris	Solo technical
European Games
Silver medal – second place	2023 Kraków-Małopolska	Free combination

Klara Bleyer (born 6 May 2004) is a German synchronised swimmer.

== Career ==
In June 2025, Bleyer competed at the 2025 European Artistic Swimming Championships and won a gold medal in the solo free routine. This was Germany's first ever solo title in this competition. In August 2026, she competed at the 2026 European Aquatics Championships and won a silver medal in the in the solo free routine with a score of 289.2463 points. She also won a bronze medal in the solo technical routine with a score of 258.0400 points.
