= Varvara Subbotina =

Russian synchronized swimmer

Personal information
- Born: 21 March 2001 (age 25) Moscow, Russia
- Height: 1.76 m (5 ft 9 in)
- Weight: 58 kg (128 lb)

Sport
- Country: Russia
- Sport: Synchronized swimming
Medal record
Women's synchronized swimming
Representing Russia
World Championships
Gold medal – first place	2019 Gwangju	Team free routine
Gold medal – first place	2019 Gwangju	Free routine combination
European Championships
Gold medal – first place	2020 Budapest	Solo free routine
Gold medal – first place	2018 Glasgow	Duet free routine
Gold medal – first place	2018 Glasgow	Duet technical routine
World Junior Championships
Gold medal – first place	2016 Kazan	Solo figures
Gold medal – first place	2016 Kazan	Solo routine
Gold medal – first place	2016 Kazan	Duet routine
Gold medal – first place	2018 Budapest	Solo technical routine
Gold medal – first place	2018 Budapest	Solo free routine

Varvara Maksimovna Subbotina (Russian: Варвара Максимовна Субботина; born 21 March 2001) is a Russian synchronized swimmer.

In 2018, Subbotina and Svetlana Kolesnichenko won the gold medal in both the duet technical routine and duet free routine at the 2018 European Aquatics Championships.
