= Artistic swimming at the 2024 European Aquatics Championships – Women's solo free routine =

Women's solo free routine at the 2024 European Aquatics Championships
- Venue: Sports Centre Milan Gale Muškatirović
- Dates: 10 June (preliminary); 13 June (final)
- Competitors: 15 from 15 nations
- Winning points: 257.4959

Medalists
gold medal	Vasiliki Alexandri	Austria
silver medal	Klara Bleyer	Germany
bronze medal	Marloes Steenbeek	Netherlands

The Women's solo free routine competition of the 2024 European Aquatics Championships was held on 10 and 13 June 2024.

== Results ==
The preliminary round was held on 10 June at 10:30. The final was held on 13 June at 10:30.

Rank	Swimmer	Nationality	Preliminary		Final	
Rank	Swimmer	Nationality	Points	Rank	Points	Rank
1st place, gold medalist(s)	Vasiliki Alexandri	Austria	251.7750	1	257.4959	1
2nd place, silver medalist(s)	Klara Bleyer	Germany	247.9438	2	253.4772	2
3rd place, bronze medalist(s)	Marloes Steenbeek	Netherlands	220.7084	3	238.1667	3
4	Valentina Bisi	Italy	146.3604	12	219.1624	4
5	Jasmine Verbena	San Marino	214.9209	4	218.3021	5
6	Maria Alavidze	Georgia	209.0459	5	217.3938	6
7	Zoi Karangelou	Greece	200.6812	7	206.0896	7
8	Matea Butorac	Croatia	202.3083	6	204.0729	8
9	Ece Üngör	Turkey	174.8938	9	202.6541	9
10	Lassar Freund	Sweden	186.1249	8	186.1771	10
11	Dalia Penkova	Bulgaria	161.5792	11	181.3395	11
12	Viktória Reichová	Slovakia	170.5980	10	177.3082	12
13	Teodora Sperlić	Serbia	132.1000	13	did not advance	
14	Sini Tuuli	Finland	123.8000	14	did not advance	
15	Karin Pesrl	Slovenia	103.2208	15	did not advance	
