= Artistic swimming at the 2024 European Aquatics Championships – Team free routine =

Team free routine at the 2024 European Aquatics Championships
- Venue: Sports Centre Milan Gale Muškatirović
- Dates: 12 June (preliminary); 14 June (final)
- Competitors: 32 from 4 nations
- Winning points: 270.1980

Medalists
gold medal	Maria Alzigkouzi Kominea; Thaleia Dampali; Athina Kamarinopoulou; Zoi Karangelou; Maria Karapanagiotou; Artemi Koutraki; Ifigeneia Krommydaki; Vasiliki Thanou	Greece
silver medal	Beatrice Andina; Valentina Bisi; Beatrice Esegio; Alessia Macchi; Giorgia Lucia Macino; Marta Murru; Carmen Rocchino; Sophie Tabbiani	Italy
bronze medal	Eleanor Blinkhorn; Florence Blinkhorn; Lily Halasi; Holly Hughes; Sophie Rowney; Robyn Swatman; Amelie Williams; Eve Young	Great Britain

The Team free routine competition of the 2024 European Aquatics Championships was held on 12 and 14 June 2024.

== Results ==
The preliminary round was held on 12 June at 10:30. The final was held on 14 June at 16:30.

Rank	Swimmer	Nationality	Preliminary		Final	
Rank	Swimmer	Nationality	Points	Rank	Points	Rank
1st place, gold medalist(s)	Greece	Maria Alzigkouzi Kominea; Thaleia Dampali; Athina Kamarinopoulou; Zoi Karangelou; Maria Karapanagiotou; Artemi Koutraki; Ifigeneia Krommydaki; Vasiliki Thanou	257.8918	1	270.1980	1
2nd place, silver medalist(s)	Italy	Beatrice Andina; Valentina Bisi; Beatrice Esegio; Alessia Macchi; Giorgia Lucia Macino; Marta Murru; Carmen Rocchino; Sophie Tabbiani	193.0709	3	254.7354	2
3rd place, bronze medalist(s)	Great Britain	Eleanor Blinkhorn; Florence Blinkhorn; Lily Halasi; Holly Hughes; Sophie Rowney; Robyn Swatman; Amelie Williams; Eve Young	210.0686	2	219.0228	3
4	Turkey	Rüya Demirkaya; Duru Kanberoğlu; Ayda Salepçioğlu; Nil Talu; Selin Telci; Tuana Uslu; Bade Yıldız; Esmanur Yirmibeş	157.1458	4	168.4081	4
