= Switzerland at the 2019 World Aquatics Championships =

- Flag of Switzerland
- FINA code: SUI
- National federation: Swiss Swimming Federation
- Website: swiss-swimming.ch (in German)

in Gwangju, South Korea
- Medals Ranked 18th: Gold 0 Silver 1 Bronze 0 Total 1

World Aquatics Championships appearances
- 1973; 1975; 1978; 1982; 1986; 1991; 1994; 1998; 2001; 2003; 2005; 2007; 2009; 2011; 2013; 2015; 2017; 2019; 2022; 2023; 2024

Switzerland competed at the 2019 World Aquatics Championships in Gwangju, South Korea from 12 to 28 July.

== Medalists ==
Medal	Name	Sport	Event	Date
Silver	Jérémy Desplanches	Swimming	Men's 200 metre individual medley	25 July

== Artistic swimming ==
Switzerland entered 11 artistic swimmers.

Women

Athlete	Event	Preliminaries		Final	
Athlete	Event	Points	Rank	Points	Rank
Noemi Peschl	Solo technical routine	81.0914	12	81.6587	12
Vivienne Koch	Solo free routine	82.1333	14	Did not advance	
Vivienne Koch; Noemi Peschl	Duet technical routine	80.8136	18	Did not advance	
Vivienne Koch; Noemi Peschl	Duet free routine	82.1667	17	Did not advance	
Ilona Fahrni; Anouk Helfer; Vivienne Koch; Paloma Mello Rodriguez; Joelle Peschl; Babou Schupbach; Alyssa Thoni; Margaux Varesio; Mila Egli (R); Noemi Peschl (R)	Team technical routine	81.7065	13	Did not advance	
Clara Bergonzi; Ilona Fahrni; Anouk Helfer; Paloma Mello Rodriguez; Joelle Peschl; Babou Schupbach; Alyssa Thoni; Margaux Varesio; Mila Egli (R); Noemi Peschl (R)	Team free routine	81.5667	14	Did not advance	

Legend: (R) = Reserve Athlete

== Diving ==
Switzerland entered six divers.

Men

Athlete	Event	Preliminaries		Semifinals		Final	
Athlete	Event	Points	Rank	Points	Rank	Points	Rank
Simon Rieckhoff	1 m springboard	314.25	28	—		Did not advance	
Jonathan Suckow	1 m springboard	346.60	14	—		Did not advance	
Jonathan Suckow	3 m springboard	362.65	31	Did not advance			
Guillaume Dutoit	3 m springboard	383.45	22	Did not advance			
Guillaume Dutoit; Simon Rieckhoff	Synchronized 3 m springboard	330.60	16	—		Did not advance	

Women

Athlete	Event	Preliminaries		Semifinals		Final	
Athlete	Event	Points	Rank	Points	Rank	Points	Rank
Madeline Coquoz	1 m springboard	187.75	37	—		Did not advance	
Michelle Heimberg	1 m springboard	218.55	16	—		Did not advance	
Michelle Heimberg	3 m springboard	241.65	28	Did not advance			
Jessica Favre	3 m springboard	258.00	20	Did not advance			
Madeline Coquoz; Jessica Favre	Synchronized 3 m springboard	264.78	9	—		268.95	11

== High diving ==
Switzerland qualified one male high diver.

Athlete	Event	Points	Rank
Matthias Appenzeller	Men's high diving	191.10	21

== Swimming ==
Switzerland entered 12 swimmers.

Men

Athlete	Event	Heat		Semifinal		Final	
Athlete	Event	Time	Rank	Time	Rank	Time	Rank
Thierry Bollin	50 m backstroke	25.37	21	Did not advance			
Jérémy Desplanches	200 m individual medley	1:58.43	4 Q	1:56.73	1 Q	1:56.56	2nd place, silver medalist(s)
Antonio Djakovic	400 m freestyle	3:51.51	20	—		Did not advance	
Yannick Käser	50 m breaststroke	27.99	34	Did not advance			
Yannick Käser	100 m breaststroke	1:01.85	38	Did not advance			
Yannick Käser	200 m breaststroke	2:17.79	45	Did not advance			
Nils Liess	100 m freestyle	49.42	31	Did not advance			
Nils Liess	200 m freestyle	1:48.29	25	Did not advance			
Nils Liess	200 m butterfly	DNS		Did not advance			
Roman Mityukov	100 m backstroke	54.87	27	Did not advance			
Roman Mityukov	200 m backstroke	1:58.04	=14 Q	1:57.93	13	Did not advance	
Aleksi Schmid	50 m butterfly	24.88	51	Did not advance			
Roman Mityukov; Nils Liess; Antonio Djakovic; Aleksi Schmid	4×100 m freestyle relay	3:16.85	19	—		Did not advance	
Antonio Djakovic; Nils Liess; Aleksi Schmid; Jérémy Desplanches	4×200 m freestyle relay	7:12.08 NR	12	—		Did not advance	
Roman Mityukov; Yannick Käser; Jérémy Desplanches; Nils Liess	4×100 m medley relay	3:36.98 NR	18	—		Did not advance	

|}

Women

Athlete	Event	Heat		Semifinal		Final	
Athlete	Event	Time	Rank	Time	Rank	Time	Rank
Nina Kost	50 m freestyle	25.74	30	Did not advance			
Nina Kost	100 m backstroke	1:02.86	37	Did not advance			
Lisa Mamie	50 m breaststroke	31.70	25	Did not advance			
Lisa Mamie	100 m breaststroke	1:07.30	10 Q	1:07.11	11	Did not advance	
Lisa Mamie	200 m breaststroke	2:24.93	4 Q	2:24.47	9	Did not advance	
Alexandra Touretski	50 m backstroke	DNS		Did not advance			
Alexandra Touretski	50 m butterfly	26.89	=25	Did not advance			
Maria Ugolkova	100 m freestyle	54.54	18	Did not advance			
Maria Ugolkova	200 m freestyle	2:00.74	25	Did not advance			
Maria Ugolkova	200 m backstroke	2:13.26	25	Did not advance			
Maria Ugolkova	200 m individual medley	2:12.35	14 Q	2:10.72	9	Did not advance	
Nina Kost; Alexandra Touretski; Maria Ugolkova; Noémi Girardet	4×100 m freestyle relay	3:41.30	13	—		Did not advance	
Nina Kost; Lisa Mamie; Alexandra Touretski; Maria Ugolkova	4×100 m medley relay	4:01.85 NR	11	—		Did not advance	

Mixed

Athlete	Event	Heat		Final	
Athlete	Event	Time	Rank	Time	Rank
Roman Mityukov; Antonio Djakovic; Maria Ugolkova; Noémi Girardet	4×100 m freestyle relay	3:29.14	11	Did not advance	
Roman Mityukov; Yannick Käser; Maria Ugolkova; Noémi Girardet	4×100 m medley relay	3:48.98	13	Did not advance	
