= Synchronised swimming at the 2012 European Aquatics Championships – Team routine =

The Team routine competition of the synchronised swimming at the 2012 European Aquatics Championships was held on May 25 with the technical and free routine. The final was held on May 26.

== Medalists ==
Gold	Silver	Bronze
Clara Basiana; Alba María Cabello; Ona Carbonell; Margalida Crespí; Andrea Fuentes; Thaïs Henríquez; Paula Klamburg; Irene Montrucchio; Spain	Lolita Ananasova; Daria Iushko; Ganna Klymenko; Olga Kondrashova; Oleksandra Sabada; Kateryna Sadurska; Kseniya Sydorenko; Anna Voloshyna; Ukraine	Federica Bellaria; Elisa Bozzo; Camilla Catteneo; Manila Flamini; Giulia Lapi; Maria Angela Perrupato; Benedetta Re; Sara Sgarzi; Italy

== Results ==
The preliminary rounds were held at 12:00 and 19:00 local time on May 25. The final was held at 19:00 on May 26.

Rank	Nationality	Technical		Free		Final	
Rank	Nationality	Points	Rank	Points	Rank	Points	Rank
1st place, gold medalist(s)	Spain	95.000	1	96.260	1	96.210	1
2nd place, silver medalist(s)	Ukraine	92.300	2	93.290	2	93.660	2
3rd place, bronze medalist(s)	Italy	89.700	3	90.290	3	90.530	3
4	France	86.200	5	87.120	4	87.590	4
5	Great Britain	85.400	6	86.280	5	86.590	5
6	Greece	86.600	4	85.770	6	85.180	6
7	Switzerland	80.700	7	80.790	7	80.940	7
8	Belarus	79.200	8	79.660	8	80.030	8
9	Austria	76.800	9	74.870	9	74.530	9
