= Artistic swimming at the 2024 European Aquatics Championships – Women's solo technical routine =

Women's solo technical routine at the 2024 European Aquatics Championships
- Venue: Sports Centre Milan Gale Muškatirović
- Dates: 11 June
- Competitors: 17 from 17 nations
- Winning points: 260.5967

Medalists
gold medal	Vasiliki Alexandri	Austria
silver medal	Klara Bleyer	Germany
bronze medal	Marloes Steenbeek	Netherlands

The Women's solo technical routine competition of the 2024 European Aquatics Championships was held on 13 June 2024.

== Results ==
The final was held on 11 June at 16:30.

Rank	Swimmers	Nationality	Points
1st place, gold medalist(s)	Vasiliki Alexandri	Austria	260.5967
2nd place, silver medalist(s)	Klara Bleyer	Germany	242.9617
3rd place, bronze medalist(s)	Marloes Steenbeek	Netherlands	240.4816
4	Maria Alavidze	Georgia	226.8666
5	Jasmine Verbena	San Marino	221.8583
6	Zoi Karangelou	Greece	206.9534
7	Ece Üngör	Turkey	203.7366
8	Robyn Swatman	Great Britain	202.7950
9	Lassar Freund	Sweden	199.8234
10	Valentina Bisi	Italy	197.0383
11	Mari Moilala	Finland	196.5434
12	Dalia Penkova	Bulgaria	181.5100
13	Viktória Reichová	Slovakia	181.4567
14	Karolína Klusková	Czech Republic	167.9050
15	Sara Stojanović	Serbia	166.7650
16	Mia Piri	Croatia	156.0133
17	Filipa Faria	Portugal	130.1566
	Karin Pesrl	Slovenia	DNS
