= Lolita Ananasova =

Ukrainian synchro-swimmer

Personal information
- Born: 9 July 1992 (age 34) Kharkiv, Ukraine

Sport
- Sport: Synchronised swimming
Medal record
Representing Ukraine
Event	1st	2nd	3rd
World Championships	0	0	4
European Championships	2	8	4
World Cup	1	2	3
World Junior Championships	0	3	0
European Junior Championships	0	6	3
Total	3	19	14
World Championships
Bronze medal – third place	2013 Barcelona	Team technical
Bronze medal – third place	2013 Barcelona	Team free
Bronze medal – third place	2013 Barcelona	Routine combination
Bronze medal – third place	2015 Kazan	Duet free routine
World Cup
Gold medal – first place	2014 Quebec City	Highlights routine
Silver medal – second place	2014 Quebec City	Duet free routine
Silver medal – second place	2014 Quebec City	Team technical routine
Bronze medal – third place	2014 Quebec City	Duet technical routine
Bronze medal – third place	2014 Quebec City	Team free routine
Bronze medal – third place	2014 Quebec City	Free routine combination
European Championships
Gold medal – first place	2014 Berlin	Combination routine
Gold medal – first place	2016 London	Team free routine
Silver medal – second place	2012 Debrecen	Team routine
Silver medal – second place	2012 Debrecen	Combination routine
Silver medal – second place	2014 Berlin	Duet routine
Silver medal – second place	2014 Berlin	Team routine
Silver medal – second place	2016 London	Duet free routine
Silver medal – second place	2016 London	Duet technical routine
Silver medal – second place	2016 London	Team technical routine
Silver medal – second place	2016 London	Combination routine
Bronze medal – third place	2010 Budapest	Solo routine
Bronze medal – third place	2010 Budapest	Team routine
Bronze medal – third place	2010 Budapest	Combination routine
Bronze medal – third place	2012 Debrecen	Solo routine
World Junior Championships
Silver medal – second place	2010 Indianapolis	Solo routine
Silver medal – second place	2010 Indianapolis	Duet routine
Silver medal – second place	2010 Indianapolis	Free routine combination
European Junior Championships
Silver medal – second place	2009 Gloucester	Team routine
Silver medal – second place	2009 Gloucester	Free routine combination
Silver medal – second place	2010 Tampere	Team routine
Silver medal – second place	2010 Tampere	Duet routine
Silver medal – second place	2010 Tampere	Solo routine
Silver medal – second place	2010 Tampere	Free routine combination
Bronze medal – third place	2007 Callela	Free routine combination
Bronze medal – third place	2009 Gloucester	Solo routine
Bronze medal – third place	2009 Gloucester	Duet routine

Lolita Volodymyrivna Ananasova (Ukrainian: Лоліта Володимирівна Ананасова; born 9 July 1992) is a Ukrainian synchro-swimmer.

== Career ==
Ananasova won three bronze medals at the 2010 European Aquatics Championships.

She finished sixth in the solo free routine at the 2009 World Aquatics Championships and sixth in the free routine combination.
