= Asha Randall =

British synchronised swimmer

Personal information
- Full name: Asha Katherine Randall
- Nationality: United Kingdom
- Born: 6 April 1990 (age 36) Ascot, England
- Height: 1.68 m (5 ft 6 in)
- Weight: 52 kg (115 lb)

Sport
- Sport: Swimming
- Strokes: Synchronised swimming
- Club: Rushmoor Synchro

Asha Katherine Randall (born 6 April 1990) is an English synchronised swimmer who represented Great Britain in the team event at the 2012 London Olympics.

Asha is the younger sister of synchronized swimmer Jenna Randall. Since announcing her retirement in 2013 from the sport along with her sister and other member of the London 2012 team, Asha has been performing as part Aquabatix, a synchronised swimming act which featured on Britain's Got Talent.
