= Daria Iushko =

Ukrainian synchronized swimmer

Personal information
- Nationality: Ukrainian
- Born: 5 February 1985 (age 41) Kharkiv, Ukrainian SSR, Soviet Union
- Height: 1.74 m (5 ft 9 in)
- Weight: 59 kg (130 lb)

Sport
- Sport: Swimming
- Strokes: Synchronized swimming
- Club: SC Ukraina
Medal record
Women's artistic swimming
Representing Ukraine
Event	1st	2nd	3rd
European Championships	1	4	6
European Junior Championships	0	4	6
Total	1	8	12
European Championships
Gold medal – first place	2016 London	Team free routine
Silver medal – second place	2012 Eindhoven	Team routine
Silver medal – second place	2012 Eindhoven	Combination routine
Silver medal – second place	2016 London	Team technical routine
Silver medal – second place	2016 London	Combination routine
Bronze medal – third place	2008 Eindhoven	Duet routine
Bronze medal – third place	2008 Eindhoven	Team routine
Bronze medal – third place	2008 Eindhoven	Combination routine
Bronze medal – third place	2010 Budapest	Duet routine
Bronze medal – third place	2010 Budapest	Combination routine
Bronze medal – third place	2012 Eindhoven	Duet routine
European Junior Championships
Silver medal – second place	2001 Kharkiv	Solo routine
Silver medal – second place	2001 Kharkiv	Team routine
Silver medal – second place	2003 Andorra la Vella	Solo routine
Silver medal – second place	2003 Andorra la Vella	Free routine combination
Bronze medal – third place	2001 Kharkiv	Duet routine
Bronze medal – third place	2002 Moscow	Solo routine
Bronze medal – third place	2002 Moscow	Duet routine
Bronze medal – third place	2002 Moscow	Team routine
Bronze medal – third place	2003 Andorra la Vella	Duet routine
Bronze medal – third place	2003 Andorra la Vella	Team routine

Daria Iushko (Ukrainian: Дарья Юшко, born 5 February 1985) is a Ukrainian synchronized swimmer who competed in the women's duet at the 2004, 2008 and 2012 Summer Olympics.
