= Marluce Schierscher =

Liechtenstein synchronized swimmer

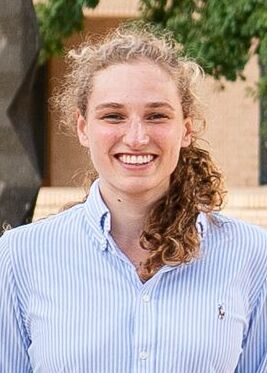
- Schierscher in 2021

Personal information
- Born: 8 September 1998 (age 27)

Sport
- Sport: Swimming
- Strokes: Synchronized swimming

Marluce Schierscher (born 8 September 1998) is a synchronized swimmer from Liechtenstein. She competed in the women's duet event at the 2020 Summer Olympics held in Tokyo, Japan. This was also the first time Liechtenstein competed in artistic swimming at the Summer Olympics.

She also represented Liechtenstein at the 2017 World Aquatics Championships in Budapest, Hungary and at the 2019 World Aquatics Championships in Gwangju, South Korea.

== Career ==
She represented Liechtenstein at the 2015 European Games held in Baku, Azerbaijan. She competed in the women's duet competition. In 2016, Schierscher and Lara Mechnig competed in the duet technical routine at the 2016 European Aquatics Championships held in London, United Kingdom. At the 2017 World Aquatics Championships, they competed in both the duet technical routine and duet free routine competitions.

In 2018, Schierscher and Mechnig finished in 14th place in the duet technical routine at the European Aquatics Championships. In the duet free routine they finished in 14th place in the preliminary round.

At the 2019 World Aquatics Championships, Schierscher and Lara Mechnig competed in the duet technical routine and duet free routine. In the duet technical routine they finished in 22nd place in the preliminary round and in the duet free routine they finished in 21st place in the preliminary round.

She also competed in the duet technical routine and duet free routine events at the 2020 European Aquatics Championships held in Budapest, Hungary.
