= Giulia Lapi =

Italian synchronized swimmer

Personal information
- Nationality: Italy
- Born: 5 November 1985 (age 40) Genoa, Italy
- Height: 1.74 m (5 ft 9 in)
- Weight: 64 kg (141 lb)

Sport
- Sport: Swimming
- Strokes: Synchronized swimming
- Club: Fiamme Oro; Ukraina Kharkiv
Medal record
Representing Italy
Synchronized swimming
LEN European Aquatics Championships
Bronze medal – third place	2012 Debrecen	Team routine
- Updated on 22 May 2015

Giulia Lapi (born 5 November 1985) is an Italian synchronized swimmer who competed in the 2008 and 2012 Summer Olympics in the duets event, finishing seventh both times. In 2008, she competed with Beatrice Adelizzi, and in 2012 with Mariangela Perrupato.
