= Vicki Lucass =

British synchronised swimmer

Personal information
- Full name: Victoria Claire Lucass
- Nickname: Vicki
- Nationality: United Kingdom
- Born: 11 September 1990 (age 35) Frimley, England
- Height: 1.70 m (5 ft 7 in)

Sport
- Sport: Swimming
- Strokes: Synchronised swimming
- Club: Rushmoor Synchro

Victoria Claire Lucass (born 11 September 1990), also known as Vicki Lucass, is a competitor in synchronised swimming who represented Great Britain in the team event at the 2012 London Olympics.
