= Katie Skelton =

British synchronised swimmer

Personal information
- Full name: Katherine Sheila Skelton
- Nationality: United Kingdom
- Born: 5 October 1987 (age 38) Reading, England
- Height: 1.60 m (5 ft 3 in)
- Weight: 52 kg (115 lb)

Sport
- Sport: Swimming
- Strokes: Synchronised swimming
- Club: Reading Royals
- Updated on 24 May 2015

Katherine Sheila Skelton (born 5 October 1987) is a competitor in synchronised swimming who represented Great Britain in the team event at the 2012 London Olympics.
