= Jennifer Knobbs =

British-Canadian synchronised swimmer

Personal information
- Full name: Jennifer Ashley Knobbs
- Nickname: Jenn
- Nationality: United Kingdom
- Born: 19 May 1989 (age 37) Toronto, Ontario
- Height: 163 cm (5 ft 4 in)

Sport
- Sport: Swimming
- Strokes: Synchronised swimming
- Club: Olympium Synchronized Swimming Club, Rushmoor Synchro
- Updated on 25 May 2015

Jennifer Knobbs (born 19 May 1989) is a British-Canadian competitor in synchronised swimming who represented Great Britain in the team event at the 2012 London Olympics.

Knobbs' father was born in Stafford, England and was a ballet dancer and a member of the Ballet Rambert aged nine. He later became of member of the National Ballet of Canada having emigrated to the country aged 17. Jennifer began synchronized swimming aged seven. At the age of 14 she won her first national championships in the Figure and Solo events. She was a member of the Canadian team for 5 years before leaving in 2009 after winning the Canadian National Championships in the Solo and Duet event categories. In 2009, Jennifer joined the British Synchronised Swimming Team and was later named to the 2012 London Team GB Olympic Team in May 2011. Team GB had an incredible performance placing sixth at the Olympic Games. "From the time she was nine years old — two years after she began synchronized swimming — Knobbs had been saying one day she would be an Olympian".

Jennifer retired to pursue a career in sports and graduated from Humber College in April 2016 with the Academic Award of Excellence in Sports Management.

In 2017, Jennifer competed at the 17th FINA World Masters Championships in Budapest, Hungary. She claimed the World Masters Title by winning the 25-29 Solo Event by over 5 points.
