= Ievgeniia Tetelbaum =

Israeli synchronized swimmer

Personal information
- Native name: יבגניה טטלבאום
- Nationality: Israeli
- Born: July 31, 1991 (age 34) Kharkiv, Ukraine
- Height: 1.58 m (5 ft 2 in)
- Weight: 49 kg (108 lb)

Sport
- Sport: Swimming
- Strokes: Synchronised swimming
- Club: Maccabi Kiriyat HaYovel, Jerusalem
- Coach: Tatiana Tsym

Ievgeniia Tetelbaum (Hebrew: יבגניה טטלבאום; born July 31, 1991) is an Israeli Olympic synchronized swimmer.

== Biography ==
Ievgeniia Tetelbaum was born in Ukraine. She immigrated to Israel at the age of 18.

== Swimming career ==
Tetelbaum began her career as a reserve swimmer on the Israeli team to the 2012 Olympics.

After the Olympics, she partnered with Anastasia Gloushkov. They placed 12th in 2014 European Aquatics Championships and 20th in 2015 World Aquatics Championships. In 2016, Tetelbaum and Gloushkov placed 12th in the 2016 Olympic Qualification Tournament and represented Israel at the 2016 Summer Olympics.

Tetelbaum and Gloushkov went on to participate in the 2016 European Aquatics Championships, finishing in 9th place (free style) with a score of 80.8667 and 10th place (Technical routine) with a score of 79.7444.

== See also ==
- Sports in Israel
