= Vasilina Khandoshka =

Belarusian synchronized swimmer

Personal information
- Native name: Васіліна Хандошка
- Nationality: Belarusian
- Born: 16 August 2001 (age 24) Minsk, Belarus
- Height: 1.65 m (5 ft 5 in)
- Weight: 47 kg (104 lb)

Sport
- Sport: Swimming
- Strokes: Synchronized swimming
Medal record
Representing Neutral Athletes A
World Championships
Silver medal – second place	2025 Singapore	Solo technical routine
Bronze medal – third place	2025 Singapore	Solo free routine
European Championships
Gold medal – first place	2026 Paris	Solo free routine
Silver medal – second place	2026 Paris	Solo technical routine
Representing Neutral Independent Athletes
World Championships
Bronze medal – third place	2024 Doha	Solo free routine
Representing Belarus
European Championships
Bronze medal – third place	2020 Budapest	Solo technical routine

Vasilina Khandoshka (Belarusian: Васіліна Хандошка; born 16 August 2001) is a Belarusian synchronized swimmer. She competed in the women's duet event at the 2020 Summer Olympics held in Tokyo, Japan. She also represented Belarus at the 2017 World Aquatics Championships in Budapest, Hungary and at the 2019 World Aquatics Championships in Gwangju, South Korea.

In 2018, at the 2018 European Aquatics Championships, she finished in 7th place in the solo technical routine and in 8th place in the solo free routine.

At the 2019 World Aquatics Championships, she finished in 9th place in the solo technical routine and in 10th place in the solo free routine. Khandoshka and Valeryia Valasach also competed in the duet technical routine and duet free routine. In the duet technical routine they finished in 16th place in the preliminary round and in the duet free routine they finished in 15th place in the preliminary round.

In 2021, she won the bronze medal in the solo technical routine at the 2020 European Aquatics Championships held in Budapest, Hungary.
