= Noemi Peschl =

Swiss synchronized swimmer

Personal information
- Born: 11 April 2000 (age 26)

Sport
- Sport: Swimming
- Strokes: Synchronized swimming

Noemi Peschl (born 11 April 2000) is a Swiss synchronized swimmer. She represented Switzerland at the 2017 World Aquatics Championships in Budapest, Hungary and at the 2019 World Aquatics Championships in Gwangju, South Korea.

At the 2019 World Aquatics Championships, Peschl finished in 12th place in the solo technical routine. Peschl and Vivienne Koch competed in the duet technical routine and duet free routine. In the duet technical routine they finished in 18th place in the preliminary round and in the duet free routine they finished in 17th place in the preliminary round.
