= Marlene Bojer =

German synchronized swimmer

Personal information
- Born: 18 March 1993 (age 33)

Sport
- Sport: Swimming
- Strokes: Synchronized swimming

Marlene Bojer (born 18 March 1993) is a German synchronized swimmer. She represented Germany at the 2015 World Aquatics Championships in Kazan, Russia, at the 2017 World Aquatics Championships in Budapest, Hungary and at the 2019 World Aquatics Championships in Gwangju, South Korea. She also competed at the 2022 World Aquatics Championships in Budapest, Hungary and 2023 World Aquatics Championships in Fukuoka, Japan.

In 2018, Bojer and Daniela Reinhardt finished in 12th place in the duet technical routine at the European Aquatics Championships. In the duet free routine they also finished in 12th place. In the solo technical routine Bojer finished in 10th place and in the solo free routine she finished in 11th place.

At the 2019 World Aquatics Championships she finished in 14th place in the preliminary round in the solo technical routine. She finished in 15th place in the preliminary round in the solo free routine. Bojer and Daniela Reinhardt competed in the duet technical routine and duet free routine. In the duet technical routine they finished in 20th place in the preliminary round and in the duet free routine they finished in 19th place in the preliminary round.
