= Veronika Yesipovich =

Belarusian synchronized swimmer

Personal information
- Born: 10 April 1996 (age 30)

Sport
- Country: Belarus
- Sport: Synchronized swimming

Veronika Yesipovich (born 10 April 1996) is a Belarusian synchronized swimmer. She competed in the women's duet at the 2016 Summer Olympics.

In 2018, Yesipovich and Iryna Limanouskaya finished in 9th place in the duet technical routine at the 2018 European Aquatics Championships. In the duet free routine they also finished in 9th place.
