= Marta Murru =

Italian artistic swimmer

Personal information
- Nationality: Italian
- Born: 28 April 2000 (age 26)

Sport
- Country: Italy
- Sport: Artistic swimming
Medal record
Women's Artistic swimming
Representing Italy
World Championships
Silver medal – second place	2022 Budapest	Highlight routine
Bronze medal – third place	2022 Budapest	Free routine combination
Bronze medal – third place	2022 Budapest	Team technical routine
European Championships
Silver medal – second place	2018 Glasgow	Free routine combination
Silver medal – second place	2022 Rome	Team technical routine
Silver medal – second place	2022 Rome	Combination routine
Silver medal – second place	2022 Rome	Highlights routine
Silver medal – second place	2024 Belgrade	Team free routine
Bronze medal – third place	2024 Belgrade	Team acrobatic routine
Bronze medal – third place	2024 Belgrade	Team technical routine

Marta Murru (born 28 April 2000) is an Italian artistic swimmer. She gave birth to her daughter in November 2023 and consequently did not compete internationally during that season.

She won a silver medal in the free routine combination event at the 2018 European Aquatics Championships.

She did not compete internationally in 2020 due to the COVID-19 pandemic. After returning to competition, she joined Italy’s “B” squad and won a silver medal in the free team event and bronze medals in the technical team and acrobatic team events at the European Championships.
