= Katie Clark =

British synchronised swimmer

Personal information
- Full name: Katie Lauren Clark
- Nationality: United Kingdom
- Born: 23 March 1994 (age 32) Reading, England
- Height: 1.68 m (5 ft 6 in)
- Weight: 52 kg (115 lb)

Sport
- Sport: Swimming
- Strokes: Synchronised swimming
- Club: Reading Royals
- Updated on 23 May 2015

Katie Lauren Clark (born 23 March 1994) is a competitor in synchronised swimming who represented Great Britain in the team event at the 2012 London Olympics.

Clark was selected as a member of the Great Britain duet competing in the 2016 Summer Olympics in Rio de Janeiro, Brazil.
