= Iryna Limanouskaya =

Belarusian synchronized swimmer

Personal information
- Born: 18 May 1994 (age 32)

Sport
- Country: Belarus
- Sport: Synchronized swimming

Iryna Limanouskaya (born 18 May 1994) is a Belarusian synchronized swimmer. She competed in the women's duet at the 2016 Summer Olympics.

In 2018, Limanouskaya and Veronika Yesipovich finished in 9th place in the duet technical routine at the 2018 European Aquatics Championships. In the duet free routine they also finished in 9th place.
