= Olivia Allison =

British synchronised swimmer

Personal information
- Full name: Olivia Allison
- Nationality: United Kingdom
- Born: 13 February 1990 (age 36) Plymouth, England
- Height: 1.69 m (5 ft 7 in)
- Weight: 54 kg (119 lb)

Sport
- Sport: Swimming
- Strokes: Synchronised swimming
- Club: Rushmoor Synchro
Medal record
Synchronised swimming
Representing United Kingdom
Commonwealth Games
Silver medal – second place	2010 Delhi	Women's duet
- Updated on 14 February 2015

Olivia Federici (née Allison; born 13 February 1990) is a British synchronised swimmer. She was born in Plymouth.

== Career ==
Her most notable achievements to date are winning four consecutive gold medals at the British Synchronised Swimming Championships from 2004 to 2007. Olivia has competed at numerous European and World Championships, and finished in 14th position in the women's duet at the 2008 Beijing Olympics. She represented Team GB again at the 2012 Olympic Games in the duet and team competitions with an improvement of ninth place in the former event.

Following a competent performance in the duet competition at the 2010 Commonwealth Games, she was rewarded with a silver medal; this continued with an overall eighth place in the women's duet at the 2011 World Championships with her partner Jenna Randall, who she has worked since the 2006 Commonwealth Games. She also competed in the women's duet at the 2016 Olympics, this time with Katie Clark.
