= Vivienne Koch =

Swiss synchronized swimmer

Personal information
- Born: 28 July 1999 (age 26)

Sport
- Sport: Swimming
- Strokes: Synchronized swimming

Vivienne Koch (born 28 July 1999) is a Swiss synchronized swimmer. She represented Switzerland at the 2017 World Aquatics Championships in Budapest, Hungary and at the 2019 World Aquatics Championships in Gwangju, South Korea.

At the 2019 World Aquatics Championships she finished in 14th place in the preliminary round in the solo free routine. Koch and Noemi Peschl competed in the duet technical routine and duet free routine. In the duet technical routine they finished in 18th place in the preliminary round and in the duet free routine they finished in 17th place in the preliminary round.
