= Evangelia Platanioti =

Greek synchronized swimmer

Personal information
- Nationality: Greek
- Born: 9 August 1994 (age 31) Athens, Greece
- Height: 1.70 m (5 ft 7 in)
- Weight: 52 kg (115 lb)

Sport
- Sport: Swimming
- Strokes: Artistic Swimming
Medal record
World Championships
Gold medal – first place	2024 Doha	Solo technical routine
Silver medal – second place	2024 Doha	Solo free routine
Bronze medal – third place	2022 Budapest	Solo technical routine
Bronze medal – third place	2022 Budapest	Solo free routine
European Championships
Silver medal – second place	2020 Budapest	Solo technical routine
Bronze medal – third place	2020 Budapest	Solo free routine
European Games
Bronze medal – third place	2023 Kraków-Małopolska	Duet technical routine

Evangelia Platanioti (Greek: Ευαγγελία Πλατανιώτη; born 9 August 1994) is a Greek artistic swimmer. She competed in the women's duet at the 2012 Summer Olympics. She also competed at the 2016 Summer Olympics in the women's duet where her partner was Evangelia Papazoglou. They finished in 10th place.

In February 2024, she won the gold medal in solo technical routine at the 2024 World Championships in Doha, Qatar.

== Career ==
In 2018, Platanioti and Papazoglou finished in 6th place in the duet technical routine at the 2018 European Aquatics Championships. In the duet free routine they finished in 5th place.

Between 2017 and 2022, she has won 9 medals (1 gold, 4 silver and 4 bronze) in FINA Artistic Swimming World Series.

In May 2021, she won two medals (1 silver and 1 bronze) at the 2020 European Championships in both solo technical and solo free held in Budapest, Hungary. She is the first-ever Greek artistic swimmer to claim 2 medals in the same European Championships.

Shortly before the 2020 Summer Olympics, she was tested positive for COVID-19 but after few days, she tested negative and she made it through Tokyo to compete in the Games. However, few hours after her Duet Technical performance, more cases were announced within the Greek artistic swimming team which resulted in the withdrawal of the entire team from the Games.

In June 2022, she won two bronze medals in both solo technical and solo free at the 2022 World Championships held in Budapest, Hungary. She is the first-ever Greek artistic swimmer to win a medal in the World Championships and to claim 2 medals in the same World Championships.

In June 2023, she won the bronze medal at the European Games in duet technical routine. Her partner was Sofia Malkogeorgou.

In February 2024, she claimed the gold medal in solo technical routine and the sliver medal in solo free routine at the 2024 World Championships held in Doha, Qatar. The gold medal that she claimed was the second-ever for Greece in World Championships competitions at any category (Youth, Junior or Senior).

== Personal life ==
Her hails is from Platanos, Aetolia-Acarnania. Platanioti was in relationship with the Greek waterpolo player Angelos Vlachopoulos.
