= Jenna Randall =

British synchronised swimmer

Personal information
- Full name: Jenna Margaret Randall
- Nationality: United Kingdom
- Born: 20 September 1988 (age 37) Ascot, England
- Height: 1.73 m (5 ft 8 in)
- Weight: 58 kg (128 lb)

Sport
- Sport: Swimming
- Strokes: Synchronised swimming
- Club: Rushmoor Synchro
Medal record
Synchronised swimming
Representing United Kingdom
Commonwealth Games
Silver medal – second place	2006 Melbourne	Women's solo
Silver medal – second place	2010 New Delhi	Women's solo
Silver medal – second place	2010 New Delhi	Women's duet
- Updated on 14 February 2015

Jenna Margaret Randall (born 20 September 1988) is an English former Synchronised swimmer who represented Great Britain at the Olympic Games in Beijing 2008 and London 2012. She is also a three-time Commonwealth Games silver medallist.

== Personal life ==
Randall was born in Ascot, Berkshire, England and educated at Hurst Lodge School, Ascot. She is the older sister of synchronised swimmer Asha Randall.

== Career ==
Jenna first competed at the Commonwealth Games in 2006 in Melbourne where she won the silver medal in the women's solo event. At the 2010 Commonwealth Games in Delhi, India, Randall again won the silver medal in the women's solo event and teamed up with Olivia Allison to win silver in the women's duet.

Randall has competed at two Olympic Games. In Beijing 2008 she finished fourteenth in the duet event with Olivia Federici (then known as Olivia Allison), while at the London 2012 Games she finished ninth in the duet, again with Federici and sixth in the team event.

Jenna announced her retirement from synchronised swimming in 2013. She later joined Cirque du Soleil's O.
