= Vasiliki Alexandri =

Greek and Austrian synchronized swimmer (born 1997)

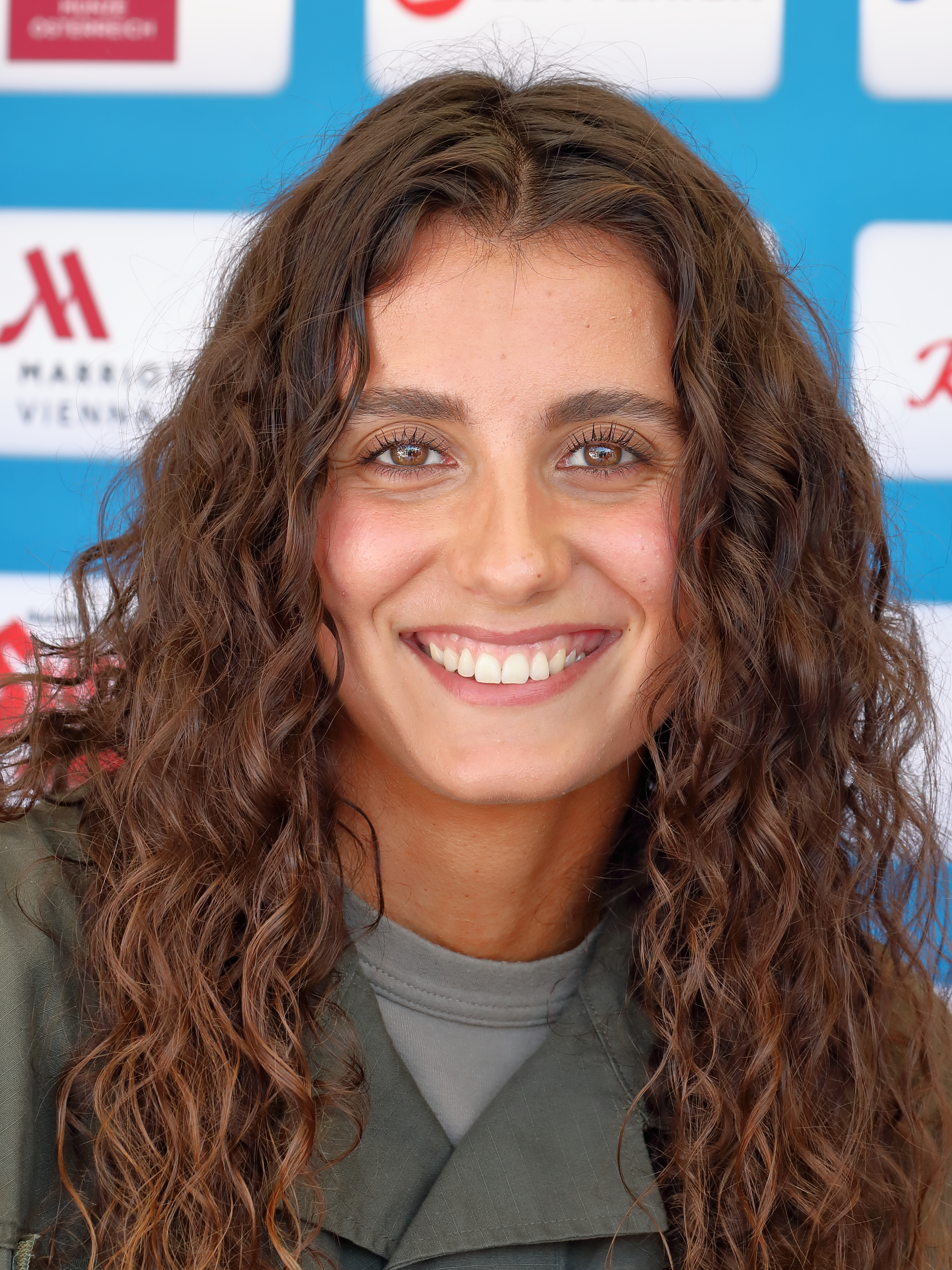
- Alexandri in 2024

Personal information
- Full name: Vasiliki-Pagona Alexandri
- Nationality: Austrian, Greek
- Born: 15 September 1997 (age 29) Marousi, Greece
- Height: 1.74 m (5 ft 9 in)

Sport
- Sport: Swimming
- Strokes: Artistic swimming
- Club: Olympiacos
Medal record
Women's artistic swimming
Representing Austria
World Championships
Silver medal – second place	2023 Fukuoka	Solo technical routine
Silver medal – second place	2023 Fukuoka	Solo free routine
European Championships
Gold medal – first place	2024 Belgrade	Solo free routine
Gold medal – first place	2024 Belgrade	Solo technical routine
Gold medal – first place	2025 Funchal	Solo technical routine
Bronze medal – third place	2022 Rome	Solo free routine
Bronze medal – third place	2022 Rome	Solo technical routine

Vasiliki Alexandri (born 15 September 1997) is a Greek and Austrian artistic swimmer.

She is a triplet. Her sisters, Anna-Maria Alexandri and Eirini-Marina Alexandri, are also artistic swimmers. The three sisters grew up in Volos and moved in Austria in 2012, after an argument with Hellenic Aquatics Federation.

On 27 February 2026, the Hellenic Olympic Committee announced Vasiliki's and her sisters return to Greece representing their birth country again starting from the 2026 European Aquatics Championships in Paris, France.

== Career ==
Vasiliki was a member of the Greek National Team from 2010 until 2012. She won gold medals in two COMEN Cups in 2010, 2011 (age group 13–15), and she competed at the European Championships (senior category) on 2012 in Eindhoven at the age of 15 years old.

She represented Austria at the 2017 World Aquatics Championships in Budapest, Hungary and at the 2019 World Aquatics Championships in Gwangju, South Korea.

At the 2018 European Aquatics Championships, she finished in 6th place in the solo technical routine.

At the 2019 World Aquatics Championships she finished in 8th place both in the solo technical routine and in the solo free routine.

She competed at the 2022 World Aquatics Championships in Budapest, Hungary.
