= Anastasia Gloushkov =

Israeli synchronized swimmer

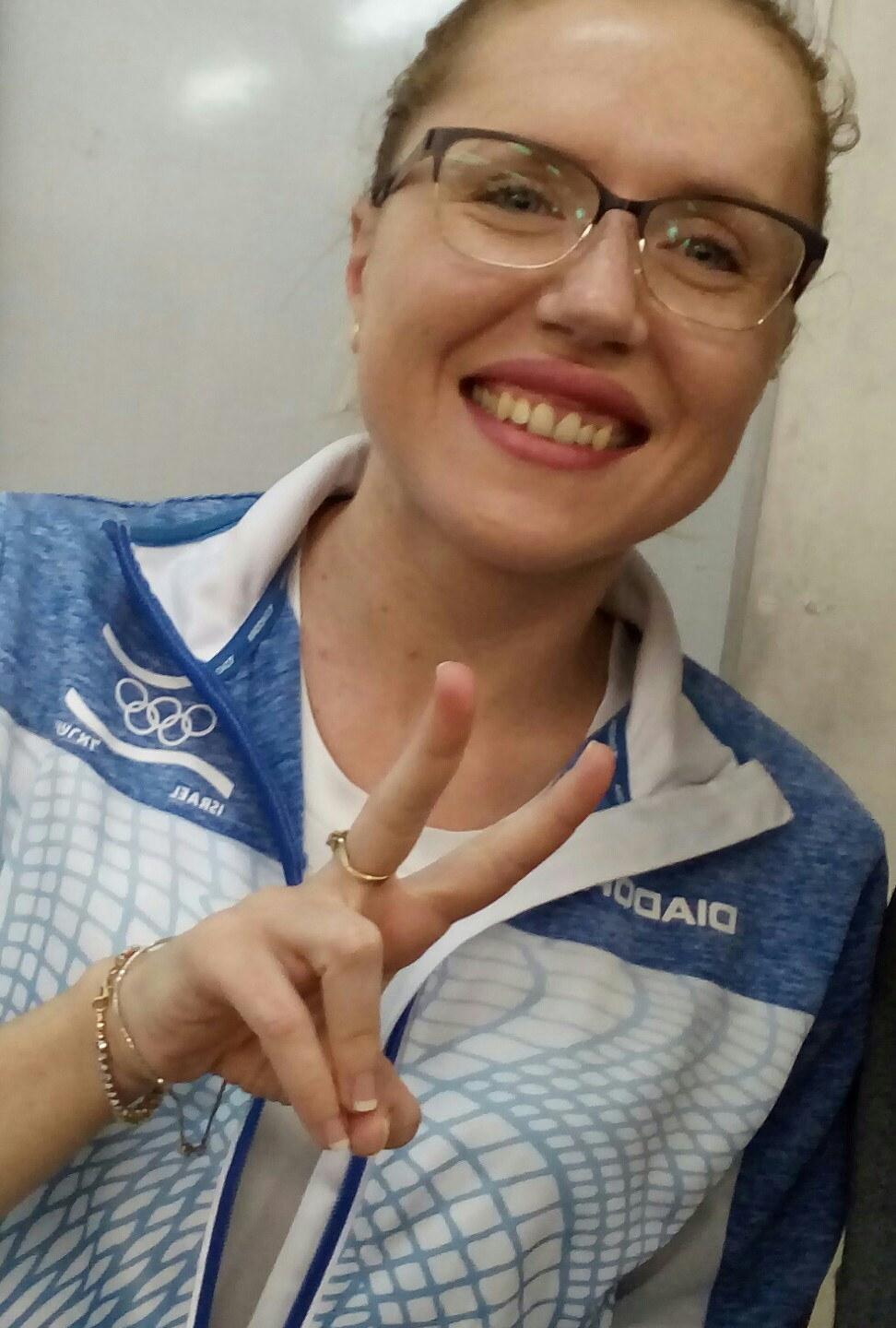

Personal information
- Native name: אנסטסיה גלושקוב
- Full name: Anastasia Gloushkov Leventhal
- Nationality: Israeli
- Born: May 24, 1985 (age 41) Moscow, Russia
- Height: 5 ft 5 in (164 cm)
- Weight: 115 lb (52 kg)

Sport
- Sport: Swimming
- Strokes: Synchronised swimming
- Club: Maccabi Kiriyat HaYovel, Jerusalem

Anastasia Gloushkov (Hebrew: אנסטסיה גלושקוב, Russian: Анастасия Глушкова; born May 24, 1985) is an Israeli Olympic synchronized swimmer.

== Biography ==
Gloushkov is Jewish, and was born in Moscow, Soviet Union. Her parents were both accomplished swimmers, and when she was six the family moved to Greece, where her parents taught swimming. Three years later, they moved to Jerusalem.

Her mother, Tatiana Tsym, coaches the Israeli synchronized swimming team, which trains in Jerusalem. Gloushkov and her fiancé live in the Jerusalem suburb of Moshav Shoresh, and she is studying for a bachelor's degree in social sciences and human resources at Achva College of Ben-Gurion University of the Negev.

=== Synchronized swimming career ===
She won a bronze medal in synchronized swimming at the 1996 Belgium Open, and was fourth at the 1998 Youth Olympic Games. At the 2000 Mediterranean Games in Jerusalem, at the age of 15 she won gold medals in both the singles and the duet events. In 2003, she won a bronze medal at the European Youth Championship.

At the 2004 European Championships, she finished 10th in singles and she and her partner Inna Yoffe finished 9th in duet. Gloushkov competed on behalf of Israel at the 2004 Summer Olympics in Athens, Greece, in the synchronized swimming duet, in which she came in 17th at the age of 19, along with Yoffe.

Gloushkov competed on behalf of Israel at the 2008 Summer Olympics in Beijing, China, in the synchronized swimming duet, in which she and Yoffe came in 15th. At the 2010 European Championships in Budapest, Hungary, she was 4th in the solo event, and 7th in the duet.

She and Yoffe placed 14th in the synchronized swimming technical duets competition in the 2011 FINA World Aquatics Championships in Shanghai, China. Gloushkov also finished 10th in the technical solo competition. The pair qualified to represent Israel at the 2012 Summer Olympics in London, finishing in 17th place.
