= Soňa Bernardová =

Czech synchronized swimmer

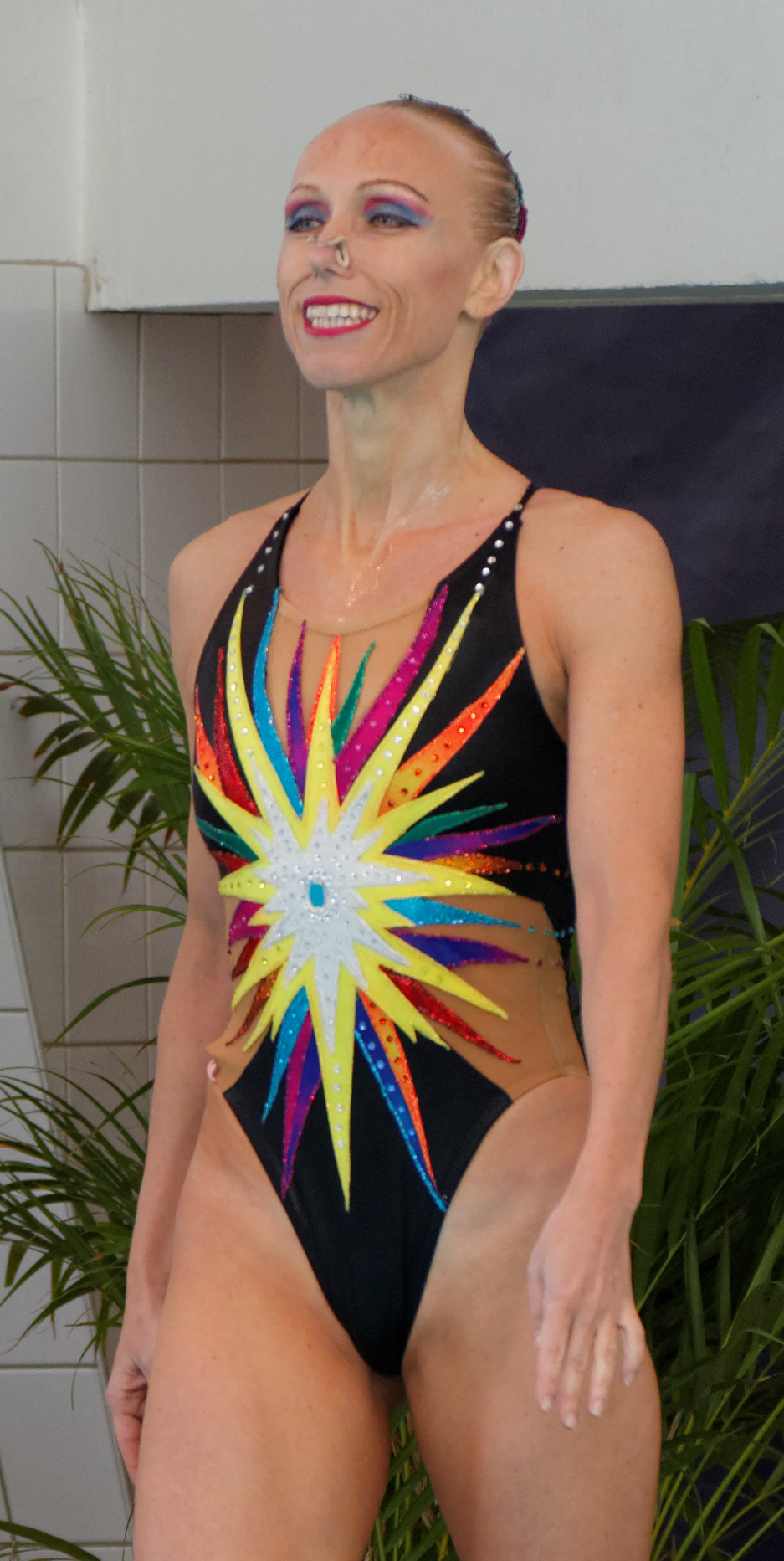
- Soňa Bernardová at the 2013 French Open

Personal information
- Nationality: Czech Republic
- Born: 2 February 1976 (age 50) Brno, Czechoslovakia
- Height: 168 cm (5 ft 6 in)
- Weight: 55 kg (121 lb)

Sport
- Sport: Swimming
- Strokes: Synchronized swimming

Soňa Bernardová (Czech pronunciation: [ˈsoɲa ˈbɛrnardovaː]; born 2 February 1976) is a Czech synchronized swimmer who competed in five Olympiades from 2000 to 2016.

Bernadová also participated in several World and European Championships in all disciplines.
