= Alžběta Dufková =

Czech synchronized swimmer

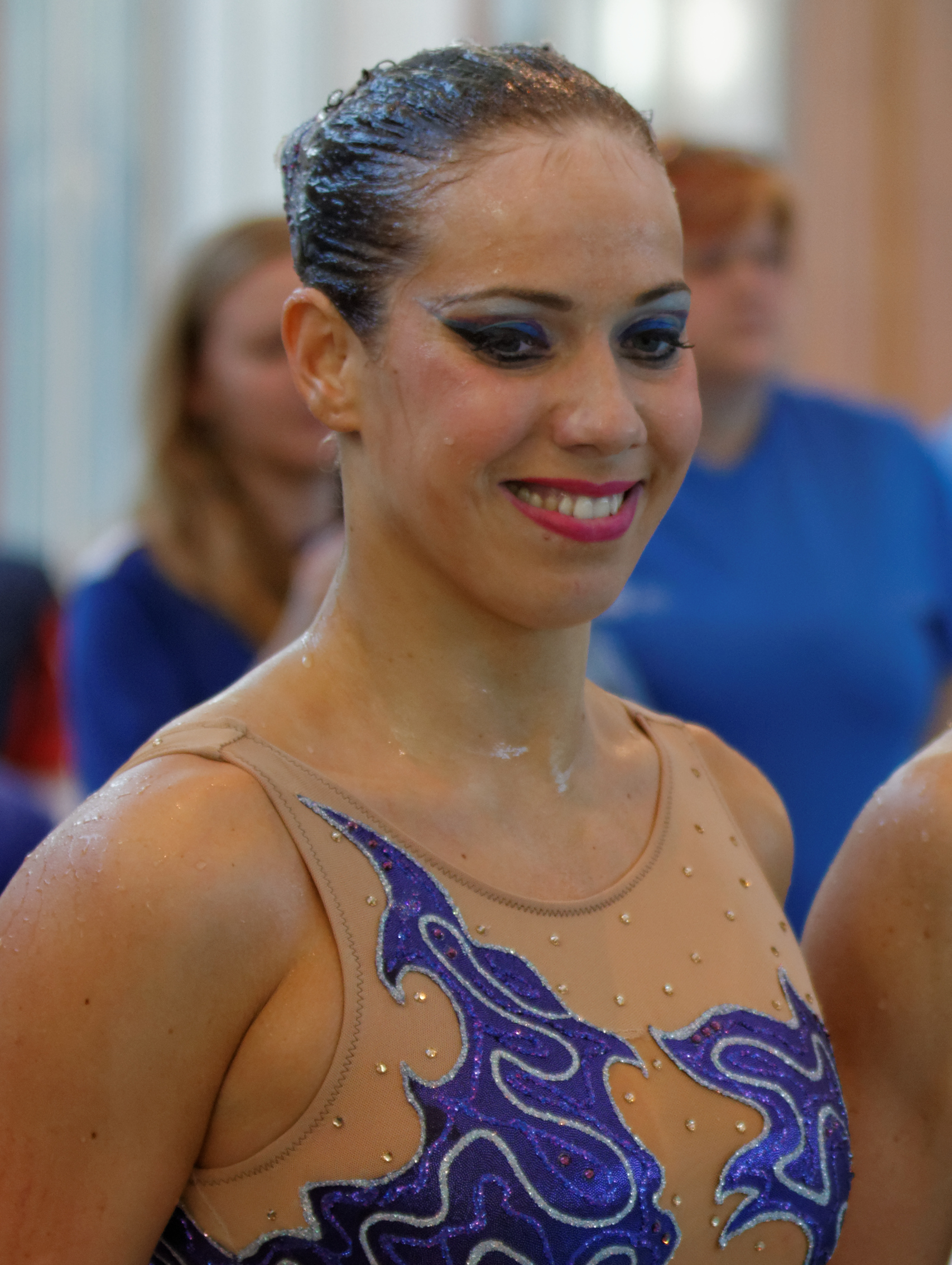
- Alžběta Dufková at the 2013 French Open

Personal information
- Nationality: Czech Republic
- Born: 19 April 1990 (age 36) Brno, Czech Republic
- Height: 171 cm (5 ft 7 in)
- Weight: 60 kg (130 lb)

Sport
- Sport: Swimming
- Strokes: Synchronized swimming

Alžběta Dufková (born 19 April 1990) is a Czech synchronized swimmer who competed in the 2008 Summer Olympics, 2012 Summer Olympics and 2016 Summer Olympics. She competed with Soňa Bernadová at all three Olympics.
