= Flag of Liechtenstein =

Principality of Liechtenstein
- Use: National flag and ensign
- Proportion: 3:5
- Adopted: 30 June 1982; 44 years ago
- Design: A horizontal bicolour of blue and red, charged with a gold crown in the canton
- Use: State flag and ensign
- Proportion: 3:5
- Adopted: 1982; 44 years ago
- Design: A horizontal bicolour of blue and red, charged with the coat of arms in the center
- Use: Civil flag and ensign
- Proportion: 3:5
- Adopted: 1921; 105 years ago
- Design: A horizontal bicolour of blue and red

The national flag of the Principality of Liechtenstein (German: Flagge Liechtensteins) consists of two horizontal bands, one blue and one red, charged with a gold crown in the canton. In use since 1852 and officially enshrined into the nation's constitution in 1921, it has been the flag of the principality since that year. The crown was added to the flag in 1937, after the country discovered at the Summer Olympics held the previous year that their flag was identical to the Haitian civil flag. A design with a modified crown was adopted on 30 June 1982.

== History ==
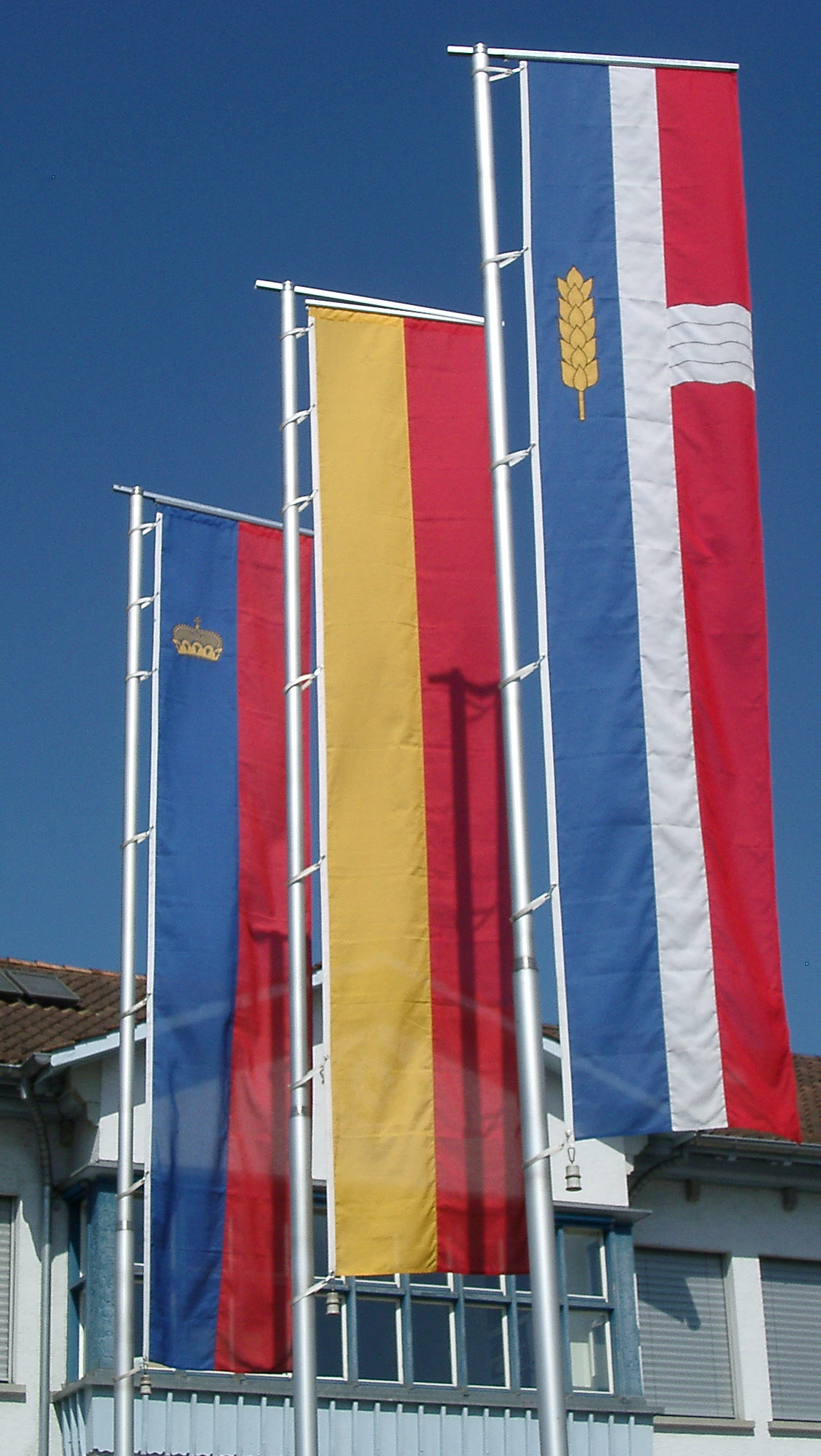
When flown vertically, the crown on the flag is rotated so that it always faces upwards.

Liechtenstein was established as a principality of the Holy Roman Empire in 1719 and gained its complete independence from the German Confederation in 1866. Within this period, the new livery colours of blue and red, were first utilized by Prince Joseph Wenzel I in 1764. In 1852, these colours were selected to be featured on the flag, instead of the gold and red from the coat of arms which were customarily employed with two horizontal bands and was used as the national flag from Liechtenstein’s creation until 1852, when the yellow was swapped out for blue.

A new constitution for the Principality was formulated and proclaimed in October 1921. It made the blue and red banner the national flag by granting it "official status". Fifteen years later, during the 1936 Summer Olympics, the country came to the realization that its flag was identical to the flag of Haiti (Haiti took part in the Opening Ceremony but its sole athlete did not compete). Because of this finding, the government added the prince's crown to the canton. This change served two purposes – to signify Liechtenstein's position as a principality, and to distinguish its flag from Haiti's. This modified design was adopted on 24 June 1937. A design with a modified crown was adopted on 30 June 1982.

== Design ==
=== Construction ===
Construction sheet for the flag of Liechtenstein

3:5

2:3

Pennant

Vertical

=== Symbolism ===
The colours and symbols of the flag carry cultural, political, and regional meanings. The blue represents the sky, while red alludes to the "evening fires" that are lit inside houses throughout the country. The crown is gold or yellow in colour.

=== Color scheme ===
Colour scheme	Blue	Red	Yellow	Black
RAL	5010	3020	1016	9005
CMYK	100-70-0-50	0-96-84-19	0-15-77-0	0-0-0-100
HEX	#002780	#CF0921	#FFD93B	#000000
RGB	0-39-128	207-9-33	255-217-59	0-0-0

== Other flags of Liechtenstein ==
=== Government flags ===
Flag	Duration	Use	Description
	1912–1957	Standard of the Prince of Liechtenstein	
	1957–1982	Standard of the Prince of Liechtenstein	
	1982–present	Standard of the Prince of Liechtenstein	
	1982–present	Standard of the Government of Liechtenstein	
		Banner of the Princely House of Liechtenstein	
		Pennant	
		Vertical	

=== Municipal flags ===
Each of the eleven municipalities has its own flag, all flown as vertical banners.

Flag	Municipality	Adopted	Description
	Balzers		
	Eschen		
	Gamprin		
	Mauren		
	Planken		
	Ruggell		
	Schaan		
	Schellenberg		
	Triesen		
	Triesenberg		
	Vaduz		

=== Historical flags ===
Flag	Duration	Use	Description
	1437–1719	Lordship of Schellenberg	
	1342–1719	County of Vaduz	
	1719–1852	Principality of Liechtenstein	Two horizontal gold and red bands at 3:5 proportions
	1852–1921	Principality of Liechtenstein	Two vertical blue and red bands at 3:5 proportions
	1921–1937	Principality of Liechtenstein	Two horizontal blue and red bands at 3:5 proportions
	1937–1982	Principality of Liechtenstein	Two horizontal blue and red bands at 3:5 proportions, and princely crown in the canton
