= Synchronised swimming at the 2013 World Aquatics Championships =

The Synchronised swimming competition at the 2013 World Aquatics Championships was held from July 20 to July 27 at the Palau Sant Jordi, Barcelona, Spain.

== Schedule ==
Date	Time	Round
20 July 2013	09:00	Solo technical routine preliminaries
20 July 2013	14:00	Team technical routine preliminaries
20 July 2013	19:00	Solo technical routine final
21 July 2013	09:00	Duet technical routine preliminaries
21 July 2013	14:00	Free routine combination preliminaries
21 July 2013	19:00	Duet technical routine final
22 July 2013	09:00	Solo free routine preliminaries
22 July 2013	19:00	Team technical routine final
23 July 2013	09:00	Duet free routine preliminaries
23 July 2013	18:00	Team free routine preliminaries
24 July 2013	19:00	Solo free routine final
25 July 2013	19:00	Duet free routine final
26 July 2013	19:00	Team free routine final
27 July 2013	19:00	Free routine combination final

== Medal summary ==
=== Medal table ===
Rank	Nation	Gold	Silver	Bronze	Total
1	Russia	7	0	0	7
2	China	0	4	0	4
3	Spain	0	3	4	7
4	Ukraine	0	0	3	3
Totals (4 entries)		7	7	7	21

- Record(*)

=== Events ===
Event	Gold		Silver		Bronze	
Solo technical routine	Svetlana Romashina; Russia	96.800	Huang Xuechen; China	95.500	Ona Carbonell; Spain	94.400
Solo free routine	Svetlana Romashina; Russia	97.340	Huang Xuechen; China	95.720	Ona Carbonell; Spain	94.290
Duet technical routine	Svetlana Kolesnichenko; Svetlana Romashina; Russia	97.300	Jiang Tingting; Jiang Wenwen; China	94.900	Ona Carbonell; Margalida Crespí; Spain	93.800
Duet free routine	Svetlana Kolesnichenko; Svetlana Romashina; Russia	97.680	Jiang Tingting; Jiang Wenwen; China	95.350	Ona Carbonell; Margalida Crespí; Spain	94.990
Team technical routine	Vlada Chigireva; Daria Korobova; Alexandra Patskevich; Elena Prokofyeva; Alla Shishkina; Maria Shurochkina; Angelika Timanina; Alexandra Zueva; Mikhaela Kalancha*; Anisya Olkhova*; Russia	96.600	Clara Basiana; Alba María Cabello; Ona Carbonell; Margalida Crespí; Thaïs Henríquez; Paula Klamburg; Meritxell Mas; Cristina Salvador; Clara Camacho*; Sara Levy*; Spain	94.400	Lolita Ananasova; Olena Grechykhina; Ganna Klymenko; Kateryna Reznik; Oleksandra Sabada; Kateryna Sadurska; Anastasiya Savchuk; Anna Voloshyna; Maryna Golyadkina*; Olha Zolotarova*; Ukraine	93.300
Team free routine	Vlada Chigireva; Svetlana Kolesnichenko; Daria Korobova; Alexandra Patskevich; Elena Prokofyeva; Alla Shishkina; Maria Shurochkina; Angelika Timanina; Anisya Olkhova*; Alexandra Zueva*; Russia	97.400	Clara Basiana; Alba María Cabello; Ona Carbonell; Margalida Crespí; Thaïs Henríquez; Paula Klamburg; Sara Levy; Meritxell Mas; Laia Pons*; Cristina Salvador*; Spain	94.230	Lolita Ananasova; Olena Grechykhina; Ganna Klymenko; Oleksandra Sabada; Kateryna Sadurska; Anastasiya Savchuk; Anna Voloshyna; Olha Zolotarova; Kateryna Reznik*; Maryna Golyadkina*; Ukraine	93.640
Free routine combination	Vlada Chigireva; Mikhaela Kalancha; Daria Korobova; Anisya Olkhova; Alexandra Patskevich; Elena Prokofyeva; Alla Shishkina; Maria Shurochkina; Angelika Timanina; Alexandra Zueva; Svetlana Kolesnichenko*; Russia	97.060	Clara Basiana; Alba María Cabello; Ona Carbonell; Margalida Crespí; Thaïs Henríquez; Paula Klamburg; Sara Levy; Meritxell Mas; Laia Pons; Cristina Salvador; Clara Camacho*; Irene Montrucchio*; Spain	94.620	Lolita Ananasova; Maryna Golyadkina; Olena Grechykhina; Ganna Klymenko; Kateryna Reznik; Oleksandra Sabada; Kateryna Sadurska; Anastasiya Savchuk; Anna Voloshyna; Olha Zolotarova; Vira Golubova*; Dana-Mariia Klymenko*; Ukraine	93.350

*Reserve
