= Synchronised swimming at the 2012 European Aquatics Championships – Combination routine =

The Combination routine competition of the synchronised swimming at the 2012 European Aquatics Championships was held on May 27.

== Medalists ==
Gold	Silver	Bronze
Clara Basiana; Alba María Cabello; Clara Camacho; Ona Carbonell; Margalida Crespí; Andrea Fuentes; Thaïs Henríquez; Paula Klamburg; Irene Montrucchio; Laia Pons; Spain	Lolita Ananasova; Olena Grechykhina; Daria Iushko; Ganna Khmelnytska; Ganna Klymenko; Olga Kondrashova; Oleksandra Sabada; Kateryna Sadurska; Kseniya Sydorenko; Anna Voloshyna; Ukraine	Federica Bellaria; Elisa Bozzo; Beatrice Callegari; Camilla Catteneo; Linda Cerruti; Francesca Deidda; Manila Flamini; Benedetta Re; Dalila Schiesaro; Sara Sgarzi; Italy

== Results ==
The final was held at 19:00 on May 27.

Rank	Nationality	Final	
Rank	Nationality	Points	Rank
1st place, gold medalist(s)	Spain	95.600	1
2nd place, silver medalist(s)	Ukraine	93.420	2
3rd place, bronze medalist(s)	Italy	90.440	3
4	Greece	85.940	4
5	Switzerland	81.620	5
6	Netherlands	80.990	6
7	Belarus	79.620	7
8	Austria	77.080	8
9	Hungary	76.860	9
