= Ukraine at the 2013 World Aquatics Championships =

- Flag of Ukraine
- World Aquatics code: UKR
- National federation: Ukrainian Swimming Federation
- Website: www.swimukraine.org.ua

in Barcelona, Spain
- Medals Ranked 22nd: Gold 0 Silver 1 Bronze 4 Total 5

World Aquatics Championships appearances
- 1994; 1998; 2001; 2003; 2005; 2007; 2009; 2011; 2013; 2015; 2017; 2019; 2022; 2023; 2024; 2025

Other related appearances
- Soviet Union (1973–1991)

Ukraine competed at the 2013 World Aquatics Championships in Barcelona, Spain between 19 July and 4 August 2013.

== Medalists ==
| Medal | Name | Sport | Event | Date |
|---|---|---|---|---|
| Silver | Illya Kvasha | Diving | Men's 1 m springboard | 22 July |
| Bronze | Lolita Ananasova; Maryna Holyadkina; Olena Grechykhina; Hanna Klymenko; Kateryna Reznik; Oleksandra Sabada; Kateryna Sadurska; Anastasiya Savchuk; Anna Voloshyna; Olha Zolotarova | Synchronized swimming | Team technical routine | 22 July |
| Bronze | Iuliia Prokopchuk | Diving | Women's 10 m platform | 25 July |
| Bronze | Lolita Ananasova; Maryna Holyadkina; Olena Grechykhina; Hanna Klymenko; Kateryna Reznik; Oleksandra Sabada; Kateryna Sadurska; Anastasiya Savchuk; Anna Voloshyna; Olha Zolotarova | Synchronized swimming | Team free routine | 26 July |
| Bronze | Lolita Ananasova; Vira Holubova; Maryna Holyadkina; Olena Grechykhina; Dana-Mariia Klymenko; Hanna Klymenko; Kateryna Reznik; Oleksandra Sabada; Kateryna Sadurska; Anastasiya Savchuk; Anna Voloshyna; Olha Zolotarova | Synchronized swimming | Free routine combination | 27 July |

== Diving ==
Ukraine qualified 12 quota places for the following diving events.

Men

| Athlete | Event | Preliminaries | | Semifinals | | Final | |
| Athlete | Event | Points | Rank | Points | Rank | Points | Rank |
|---|---|---|---|---|---|---|---|
| Illya Kvasha | 1 m springboard | 391.95 | 3 Q | — | | 434.30 | 2nd place, silver medalist(s) |
| Oleh Kolodiy | 1 m springboard | 349.75 | 12 Q | — | | 375.75 | 12 |
| Illya Kvasha | 3 m springboard | 457.15 | 2 Q | 420.95 | 11 Q | 494.10 | 4 |
| Oleksandr Gorshkovozov | 3 m springboard | 392.50 | 17 Q | 433.95 | 9 Q | 425.85 | 10 |
| Oleksandr Bondar | 10 m platform | 457.70 | 5 Q | 442.85 | 11 Q | 447.30 | 7 |
| Anton Zakharov | 10 m platform | 400.55 | 16 Q | 396.50 | 16 | did not advance | |
| Illya Kvasha; Oleksiy Pryhorov | 3 m synchronized springboard | 420.81 | 4 Q | — | | 403.65 | 7 |
| Oleksandr Gorshkovozov; Dmytro Mezhenskyi | 10 m synchronized platform | 406.59 | 5 Q | — | | 425.52 | 6 |

Women

| Athlete | Event | Preliminaries | | Semifinals | | Final | |
| Athlete | Event | Points | Rank | Points | Rank | Points | Rank |
|---|---|---|---|---|---|---|---|
| Anastasiya Nedobiga | 1 m springboard | 230.05 | 15 | — | | did not advance | |
| Olena Fedorova | 3 m springboard | 281.10 | 13 Q | 277.30 | 16 | did not advance | |
| Hanna Pysmenska | 3 m springboard | 300.90 | 7 Q | 300.00 | 11 Q | 256.20 | 12 |
| Hanna Krasnoshlyk | 10 m platform | 290.25 | 16 Q | 294.75 | 13 | did not advance | |
| Iuliia Prokopchuk | 10 m platform | 328.25 | 4 Q | 302.40 | 11 Q | 354.40 | 3rd place, bronze medalist(s) |
| Olena Fedorova; Hanna Pysmenska | 3 m synchronized springboard | 274.50 | 7 Q | — | | 270.90 | 10 |

== High diving ==
Ukraine has qualified two athletes in high diving.

| Athlete | Event | Points | Rank |
|---|---|---|---|
| Anatoliy Shabotenko | Men's high diving | 498.60 | 7 |
| Diana Tomilina | Women's high diving | 153.95 | 6 |

== Open water swimming ==
Ukraine qualified three quota places for the following events in open water swimming.

| Athlete | Event | Time | Rank |
|---|---|---|---|
| Ihor Chervynskiy | Men's 5 km | 53:38.4 | 10 |
| Ihor Chervynskiy | Men's 10 km | 1:49:40.6 | 19 |
| Ihor Chervynskiy | Men's 25 km | DNF | |
| Ihor Snitko | Men's 5 km | 54:01.2 | 33 |
| Ihor Snitko | Men's 10 km | 1:50:18.9 | 29 |
| Olha Beresnyeva | Women's 10 km | 1:58:27.9 | 18 |
| Olha Beresnyeva | Women's 25 km | DNF | |

== Swimming ==
Ukrainian swimmers earned qualifying standards in the following events (up to a maximum of 2 swimmers in each event at the A-standard entry time, and 1 at the B-standard):

Men

| Athlete | Event | Heat | | Semifinal | | Final | |
| Athlete | Event | Time | Rank | Time | Rank | Time | Rank |
|---|---|---|---|---|---|---|---|
| Ihor Borysyk | 50 m breaststroke | 28.07 | =33 | did not advance | | | |
| Ihor Borysyk | 100 m breaststroke | 1:01.71 | 33 | did not advance | | | |
| Ihor Borysyk | 200 m breaststroke | 2:15.84 | 31 | did not advance | | | |
| Serhiy Frolov | 400 m freestyle | 3:53.92 | 25 | — | | did not advance | |
| Serhiy Frolov | 800 m freestyle | 7:58.70 | 18 | — | | did not advance | |
| Serhiy Frolov | 1500 m freestyle | 15:17.47 | 18 | — | | did not advance | |
| Andriy Hovorov | 50 m freestyle | 21.80 NR | 3 Q | 21.96 | 12 | did not advance | |
| Andriy Hovorov | 50 m butterfly | 23.19 NR | 4 Q | 22.97 NR | 5 Q | 23.22 | 5 |
| Maksym Shemberev | 200 m individual medley | 2:03.49 | 34 | did not advance | | | |
| Maksym Shemberev | 400 m individual medley | 4:22.65 | 20 | — | | did not advance | |

Women

| Athlete | Event | Heat | | Semifinal | | Final | |
| Athlete | Event | Time | Rank | Time | Rank | Time | Rank |
|---|---|---|---|---|---|---|---|
| Hanna Dzerkal | 200 m breaststroke | 2:34.06 | 30 | did not advance | | | |
| Hanna Dzerkal | 200 m individual medley | 2:16.52 | 27 | did not advance | | | |
| Hanna Dzerkal | 400 m individual medley | 4:53.34 | 26 | — | | did not advance | |
| Mariya Liver | 50 m breaststroke | 30.68 | 6 Q | 30.94 | 9 | did not advance | |
| Mariya Liver | 100 m breaststroke | 1:09.95 | 30 | did not advance | | | |
| Viktoriya Solnceva | 50 m breaststroke | 31.63 | 21 | did not advance | | | |
| Viktoriya Solnceva | 100 m breaststroke | 1:06.79 NR | 5 Q | 1:06.67 NR | 6 Q | 1:06.81 | 6 |
| Viktoriya Solnceva | 200 m breaststroke | 2:24.65 NR | 6 Q | 2:24.19 NR | 7 Q | 2:23.01 NR | 5 |
| Daryna Zevina | 100 m backstroke | 1:00.43 | 10 Q | 59.90 NR | 6 Q | 1:00.16 | 7 |
| Daryna Zevina | 200 m backstroke | 2:09.31 | 7 Q | 2:08.74 | 5 Q | 2:08.72 | 4 |

== Synchronized swimming ==
Ukraine has qualified twelve synchronized swimmers.

| Athlete | Event | Preliminaries | | Final | |
| Athlete | Event | Points | Rank | Points | Rank |
|---|---|---|---|---|---|
| Lolita Ananasova | Solo free routine | 91.990 | 4 Q | 92.740 | 4 |
| Anna Voloshyna | Solo technical routine | 92.100 | 4 Q | 92.900 | 4 |
| Lolita Ananasova; Anna Voloshyna | Duet free routine | 92.530 | 4 Q | 92.620 | 4 |
| Lolita Ananasova; Anna Voloshyna | Duet technical routine | 91.800 | 4 Q | 92.400 | 4 |
| Lolita Ananasova; Maryna Holyadkina*; Olena Grechykhina; Hanna Klymenko; Kateryna Reznik*; Oleksandra Sabada; Kateryna Sadurska; Anastasiya Savchuk; Anna Voloshyna; Olha Zolotarova | Team free routine | 93.100 | 3 Q | 93.640 | 3rd place, bronze medalist(s) |
| Lolita Ananasova; Maryna Holyadkina*; Olena Grechykhina; Hanna Klymenko; Kateryna Reznik*; Oleksandra Sabada; Kateryna Sadurska; Anastasiya Savchuk; Anna Voloshyna; Olha Zolotarova | Team technical routine | 93.200 | 3 Q | 93.300 | 3rd place, bronze medalist(s) |
| Lolita Ananasova; Vira Holubova; Maryna Holyadkina*; Olena Grechykhina; Dana-Mariia Klymenko; Hanna Klymenko; Kateryna Reznik; Oleksandra Sabada; Kateryna Sadurska; Anastasiya Savchuk; Anna Voloshyna; Olha Zolotarova | Free routine combination | 92.860 | 3 Q | 93.350 | 3rd place, bronze medalist(s) |
