= Ukraine at the 2011 World Aquatics Championships =

Sporting event delegation

Flag of Ukraine

Ukraine competed at the 2011 World Aquatics Championships in Shanghai, China between July 16 and 31, 2011.

== Medalists ==
Medal	Name	Sport	Event	Date
Bronze	Oleksandr Gorshkovozov; Oleksandr Bondar	Diving	Men's 10m Synchro Platform	17 July

== Diving ==
Ukraine has qualified 10 athletes in diving.

Men

Athlete	Event	Preliminary		Semifinals		Final	
Athlete	Event	Points	Rank	Points	Rank	Points	Rank
Oleksandr Gorshkovozov	Men's 1m Springboard	361.75	13			did not advance	
Oleksiy Prygorov	Men's 1m Springboard	352.30	16			did not advance	
Oleksiy Prygorov	Men's 3m Springboard	408.35	17 Q	448.25	6 Q	399.30	12
Dmytro Mezhenskyi	Men's 3m Springboard	415.90	16 Q	396.20	17	did not advance	
Oleksandr Bondar	Men's 10m Platform	423.90	14 Q	435.60	11 Q	457.35	8
Kostyantyn Milyaev	Men's 10m Platform	428.75	13 Q	419.95	12 Q	407.50	12
Oleksandr Gorshkovozov; Dmytro Mezhenskyi	Men's 3m Synchro Springboard	380.52	7 Q			412.20	6
Oleksandr Bondar; Oleksandr Gorshkovozov	Men's 10m Synchro Platform	423.99	6 Q			435.36	Bronze medal

Women

Athlete	Event	Preliminary		Semifinals		Final	
Athlete	Event	Points	Rank	Points	Rank	Points	Rank
Olena Fedorova	Women's 1m Springboard	258.30	9 Q			274.15	10
Olena Fedorova	Women's 3m Springboard	293.90	15 Q	289.85	15	did not advance	
Hanna Pysmenska	Women's 1m Springboard	251.40	13			did not advance	
Hanna Pysmenska	Women's 3m Springboard	301.90	12 Q	306.25	9 Q	317.25	8
Iukiia Prokopchuk	Women's 10m Platform	321.35	7 Q	316.95	10 Q	340.15	6
Olena Fedorova; Anna Pysmenska	Women's 3m Synchro Springboard	291.90	2 Q			302.40	4
Viktoriya Potyekhina; Iukiia Prokopchuk	Women's 10m Synchro Platform	283.62	7 Q			311.64	5

== Open water swimming ==
Men

Athlete	Event	Final	
Athlete	Event	Time	Position
Igor Snitko	Men's 5km	56:31.6	14
Igor Snitko	Men's 10km	1:54:55.6	19
Igor Chervynskiy	Men's 5km	58:28.5	30
Igor Chervynskiy	Men's 10km	1:54:58.7	21

Women

Athlete	Event	Final	
Athlete	Event	Time	Position
Alona Berbasova	Women's 5km	1:01:22.6	25
Alona Berbasova	Women's 10km	2:11:05.2	41
Olga Beresnyeva	Women's 10km	2:02:25.1	15
Olga Beresnyeva	Women's 25km	5:29:35.6	4

== Swimming ==
Ukraine qualified 11 swimmers.

Men

Athlete	Event	Heats		Semifinals		Final	
Athlete	Event	Time	Rank	Time	Rank	Time	Rank
Andriy Govorov	Men's 50m Freestyle	22.51	22	did not advance			
Andriy Govorov	Men's 50m Butterfly	23.63	9 Q	23.39	5 Q	23.64	8
Sergiy Frolov	Men's 400m Freestyle	3:55.01	27			did not advance	
Sergiy Frolov	Men's 800m Freestyle	8:03.87	21			did not advance	
Sergiy Frolov	Men's 1500m Freestyle	15:14.38	16			did not advance	
Anton Goncharov	Men's 800m Freestyle	8:02.07	19			did not advance	
Valerii Dymo	Men's 50m Breaststroke	28.44	31	did not advance			
Valerii Dymo	Men's 100m Breaststroke	1:01.52	28	did not advance			
Igor Borysik	Men's 100m Breaststroke	1:01.25	20	did not advance			
Igor Borysik	Men's 200m Breaststroke	2:13.17	19	did not advance			
Maksym Shemberev	Men's 200m Breaststroke	2:13.18	20	did not advance			
Maksym Shemberev	Men's 400m IM	4:19.29	17			did not advance	

Women

Athlete	Event	Heats		Semifinals		Final	
Athlete	Event	Time	Rank	Time	Rank	Time	Rank
Darya Stepanyuk	Women's 50m Freestyle	25.50	19	did not advance			
Daryna Zevina	Women's 200m Freestyle	2:01.50	32	did not advance			
Daryna Zevina	Women's 400m Freestyle	4:15.65	22			did not advance	
Daryna Zevina	Women's 50m Backstroke	28.99	21	did not advance			
Daryna Zevina	Women's 100m Backstroke	1:01.36	15 Q	1:00.05	10	did not advance	
Daryna Zevina	Women's 200m Backstroke	2:08.35	2 Q	2:08.22	4 Q	2:07.82	4
Alina Vats	Women's 50m Backstroke	29.24	26	did not advance			
Alina Vats	Women's 100m Backstroke	1:02.80	32	did not advance			
Ganna Dzerkal	Women's 200m IM	2:16.17	21	did not advance			
Ganna Dzerkal	Women's 400m IM	4:48.17	23			did not advance	
Valeriya Podlesna; Darya Stepanyuk; Ganna Dzerkal; Daryna Zevina	Women's 4 × 200 m Freestyle Relay	8:06.42	14			did not advance	

== Synchronised swimming ==
Ukraine has qualified 12 athletes in synchronised swimming.

Women

Athlete	Event	Preliminary		Final	
Athlete	Event	Points	Rank	Points	Rank
Lolita Ananasova	Solo Technical Routine	89.600	6 Q	90.700	6
Lolita Ananasova	Solo Free Routine	91.400	6 Q	91.550	6
Daria Iushko; Kseniya Sydorenko	Duet Technical Routine	90.900	6 Q	91.300	6
Daria Iushko; Kseniya Sydorenko	Duet Free Routine	92.100	6 Q	91.580	6
Lolita Ananasova; Inga Gillyer; Daria Iushko; Ganna Klymenko; Oleksandra Sabada; Kateryna Sadurska; Kseniya Sydorenko; Anna Voloshyna	Team Technical Routine	92.100	6 Q	92.200	6
Lolita Ananasova; Inga Gillyer; Ganna Khmelnytska; Ganna Klymenko; Olga Kondrashova; Oleksandra Sabada; Kateryna Sadurska; Anna Voloshyna	Team Free Routine	91.960	6 Q	92.740	6
Lolita Ananasova; Inga Gillyer; Daria Iushko; Ganna Khmelnytska; Olga Kondrashova; Grechykhina Olena; Oleksandra Sabada; Kateryna Sadurska; Kseniya Sydorenko; Anna Voloshyna	Free Routine Combination	92.410	5 Q	92.080	5

Reserves

- Ganna Orel
