= Artistic swimming at the 2020 Summer Olympics =

Artistic swimming at the Games of the XXXII Olympiad
- Artistic swimming pictogram for the 2020 Summer Olympics
- Venue: Tokyo Aquatics Centre
- Dates: 2–7 August 2021
- No. of events: 2
- Competitors: 104 from 22 nations

Artistic swimming (formerly synchronised swimming) competitions at the 2020 Summer Olympics in Tokyo, Japan featured a total of 104 athletes competing in two medal events, namely the women's duet and the women's team. The events took place in 2021 following the Games' postponement from 2020 due to the COVID-19 pandemic.

== Qualification ==
For the team competitions, the best ranked NOC in each of the five continental championships, with the exception of the host country Japan, qualified. The remaining NOCs are able to qualify for the two highest-ranked spots at the 2019 World Aquatics Championships and the three highest-ranked spots at the Olympic Qualification Tournament. For the duet, the best ranked NOC in each of the five continental championships that did not have a qualified team is to be assured of a secured spot, while the other seven top-ranked NOCs are to be selected through the Olympic Qualification Tournament. All 10 NOCs that had already qualified in the team event automatically qualify a duet (which much consist of members of the team).

== Participating nations ==
- Australia (8)
- Austria (2)
- Belarus (2)
- Canada (8)
- China (8)
- Colombia (2)
- Egypt (8)
- France (2)
- Great Britain (2)
- Greece (8)
- Israel (2)
- Italy (8)
- Japan (8)
- Kazakhstan (2)
- Liechtenstein (2)
- Mexico (2)
- Netherlands (2)
- ROC (8)
- Spain (8)
- South Africa (2)
- Ukraine (8)
- United States (2)

== Competition schedule ==
All times are Japan Standard Time (UTC+9).

Day	Date	Start	Finish	Event	Phase
Day 10	Monday 2 August 2021	19:30	21:30	Duet	Free Routine Preliminary
Day 11	Tuesday 3 August 2021	19:30	21:00	Duet	Technical Routine
Day 12	Wednesday 4 August 2021	19:30	21:00	Duet	Free Routine Final
Day 14	Friday 6 August 2021	19:30	21:30	Team	Technical Routine
Day 15	Saturday 7 August 2021	19:30	21:00	Team	Free Routine

== Medalists ==
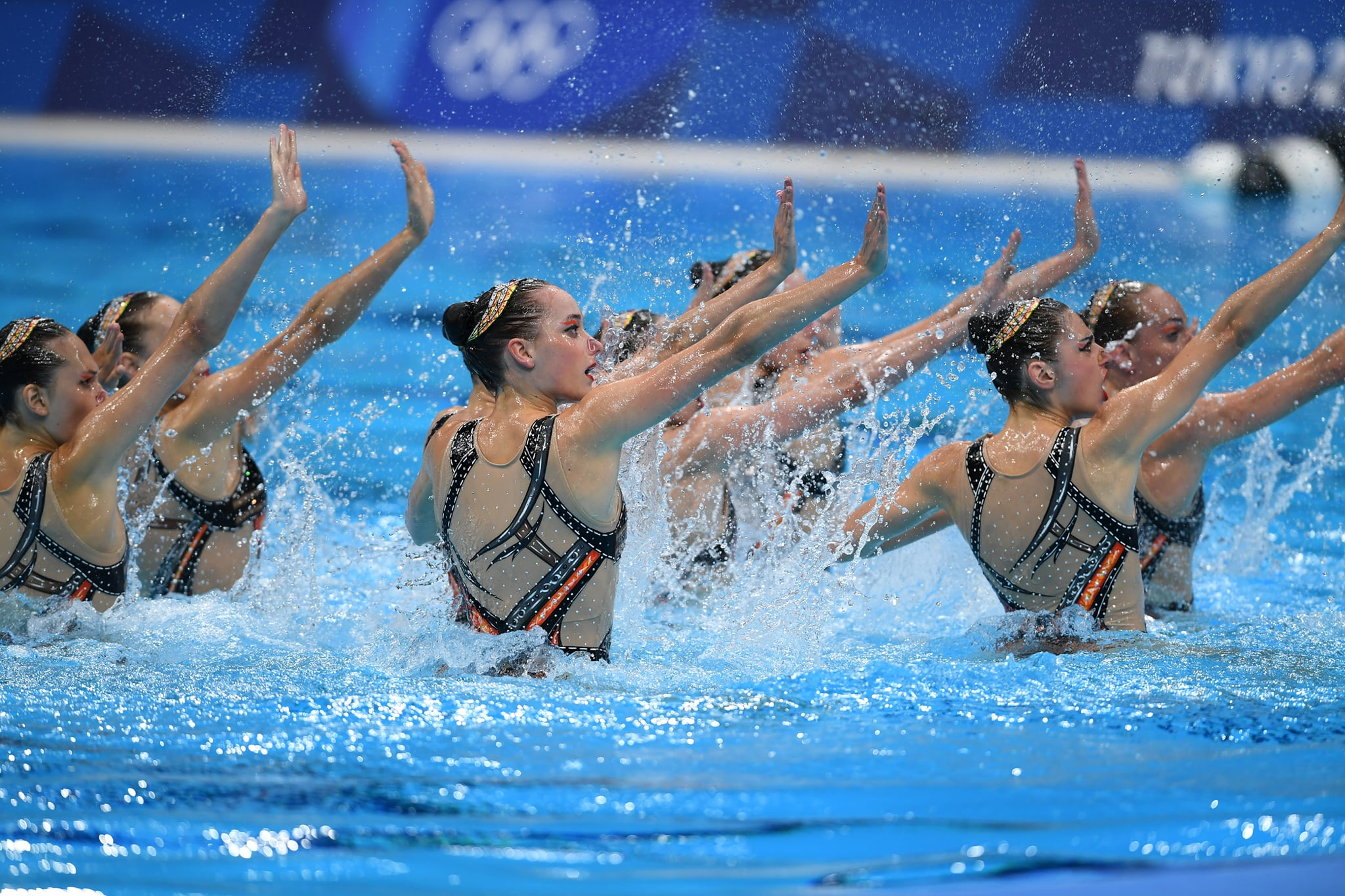
Ukrainian artistic swimming team performing their free routine in the team event on 7 August 2021

=== Medal table ===
Rank	NOC	Gold	Silver	Bronze	Total
1	ROC	2	0	0	2
2	China	0	2	0	2
3	Ukraine	0	0	2	2
Totals (3 entries)		2	2	2	6

=== Medalists ===
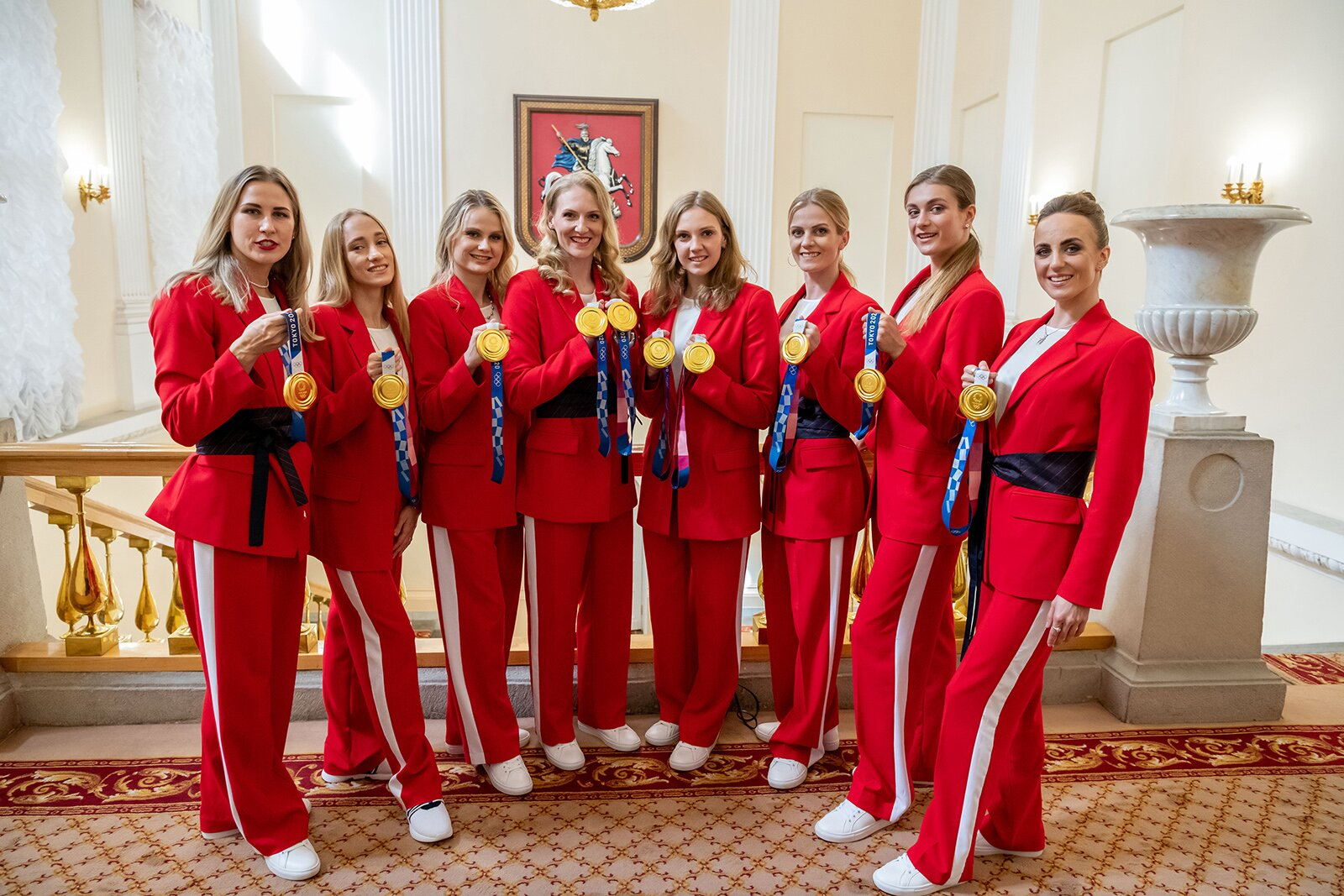
Medalists from Russia

Event	Gold	Silver	Bronze
Duet	ROC; Svetlana Kolesnichenko; Svetlana Romashina	China; Huang Xuechen; Sun Wenyan	Ukraine; Marta Fiedina; Anastasiya Savchuk
Team	ROC; Vlada Chigireva; Marina Goliadkina; Svetlana Kolesnichenko; Polina Komar; Alexandra Patskevich; Svetlana Romashina; Alla Shishkina; Maria Shurochkina	China; Feng Yu; Guo Li; Huang Xuechen; Liang Xinping; Sun Wenyan; Wang Qianyi; Xiao Yanning; Yin Chengxin	Ukraine; Maryna Aleksiyiva; Vladyslava Aleksiyiva; Marta Fiedina; Kateryna Reznik; Anastasiya Savchuk; Alina Shynkarenko; Kseniya Sydorenko; Yelyzaveta Yakhno

== See also ==
- Artistic swimming at the 2018 Asian Games
- Artistic swimming at the 2019 Pan American Games
- Artistic swimming at the 2019 World Aquatics Championships
