= Synchronised swimming at the 2014 European Aquatics Championships – Combination routine =

Combination routine at the Synchronised swimming at the 2014 European Aquatics Championships
- Dates: 15–17 August
- Competitors: 100 from 10 nations
- Winning time: 94.4333

Medalists
gold medal	Lolita Ananasova; Olena Grechykhina; Oleksandra Kashuba; Kateryna Reznik; Oleksandra Sabada; Kateryna Sadurska; Anastasiya Savchuk; Kseniya Sydorenko; Anna Voloshyna; Olha Zolotarova; Dana-Mariia Klymenko (reserve); Olga Kondrashova (reserve)	Ukraine
silver medal	Clara Basiana; Clara Camacho; Ona Carbonell; Margalida Crespí; Sara Gijon; Thaïs Henríquez; Cecilia Jiménez; Sara Levy; Meritxell Mas; Cristina Salvador; Alba María Cabello (reserve); Paula Klamburg (reserve)	Spain
bronze medal	Elisa Bozzo; Beatrice Callegari; Camilla Cattaneo; Linda Cerruti; Francesca Deidda; Costanza Ferro; Manila Flamini; Mariangela Perrupato; Dalila Schiesaro; Sara Sgarzi; Alessia Pezone (reserve); Federica Sala (reserve)	Italy

The Combination routine competition of the 2014 European Aquatics Championships was held on 15–17 August.

== Results ==
The preliminary round was held on 15 August at 18:00. The preliminary round was held on 17 August at 18:00.

Rank	Nationality	Preliminary		Final	
Rank	Nationality	Points	Rank	Points	Rank
1st place, gold medalist(s)	Ukraine	93.1667	1	94.4333	1
2nd place, silver medalist(s)	Spain	92.0333	2	93.0333	2
3rd place, bronze medalist(s)	Italy	89.4000	3	90.3333	3
4	Greece	83.8000	4	85.7333	4
5	Belarus	81.1667	5	82.9333	5
6	Switzerland	79.9333	6	80.4333	6
7	Germany	78.6667	7	78.7333	7
8	Great Britain	74.1333	8	76.1333	8
9	Hungary	73.6667	9	73.5000	9
10	Turkey	72.7667	10	73.3000	10
