= Synchronised swimming at the 2016 European Aquatics Championships – Combination routine =

Combination routine at the 2016 European Aquatics Championships
- Dates: 12 May
- Competitors: 100 from 10 nations
- Teams: 10
- Winning points: 96.5000

Medalists
gold medal	Vlada Chigireva; Marina Goliadkina; Svetlana Kolesnichenko; Liliia Nizamova; Alexandra Patskevich; Elena Prokofyeva; Alla Shishkina; Maria Shurochkina; Darina Valitova; Gelena Topilina; Michaėla Kalanča (reserve)	Russia
silver medal	Lolita Ananasova; Olena Grechykhina; Daria Iushko; Ekaterina Reznik; Oleksandra Sabada; Kateryna Sadurska; Anastasiya Savchuk; Kseniya Sydorenko; Anna Voloshyna; Olha Zolotarova; Oleksandra Kashuba (reserve); Olga Kondrashova (reserve)	Ukraine
bronze medal	Elisa Bozzo; Beatrice Callegari; Camilla Cattaneo; Linda Cerruti; Francesca Deidda; Costanza Ferro; Manila Flamini; Gemma Galli; Mariangela Perrupato; Sara Sgarzi; Costanza Di Camillo (reserve)	Italy

The Combination routine competition of the 2016 European Aquatics Championships was held on 12 May 2016.

== Results ==
The final was held at 16:00.

Rank	Nation	
Rank	Nation	Points
1st place, gold medalist(s)	Russia	96.5000
2nd place, silver medalist(s)	Ukraine	93.4333
3rd place, bronze medalist(s)	Italy	90.9333
4	Spain	88.9000
5	Greece	87.0000
6	Switzerland	82.8333
7	Belarus	81.5000
8	Great Britain	77.9667
9	Germany	76.1000
10	Portugal	72.0333
