= Synchronised swimming at the 2016 European Aquatics Championships – Team technical routine =

Team technical routine at the 2016 European Aquatics Championships
- Dates: 9 May
- Competitors: 80 from 10 nations
- Teams: 10
- Winning points: 94.0994

Medalists
gold medal	Vlada Chigireva; Marina Goliadkina; Svetlana Kolesnichenko; Alexandra Patskevich; Elena Prokofyeva; Alla Shishkina; Maria Shurochkina; Gelena Topilina; Liliia Nizamova (reserve); Darina Valitova (reserve)	Russia
silver medal	Lolita Ananasova; Olena Grechykhina; Daria Iushko; Oleksandra Sabada; Kateryna Sadurska; Anastasiya Savchuk; Kseniya Sydorenko; Anna Voloshyna; Olga Kondrashova (reserve); Olha Zolotarova (reserve)	Ukraine
bronze medal	Elisa Bozzo; Beatrice Callegari; Camilla Cattaneo; Francesca Deidda; Costanza Ferro; Manila Flamini; Mariangela Perrupato; Sara Sgarzi; Linda Cerruti (reserve); Gemma Galli (reserve)	Italy

The Team technical routine competition of the 2016 European Aquatics Championships was held on 9 May 2016.

== Results ==
The final was held at 16:30.

Rank	Nation	
Rank	Nation	Points
1st place, gold medalist(s)	Russia	94.0994
2nd place, silver medalist(s)	Ukraine	92.0844
3rd place, bronze medalist(s)	Italy	88.9053
4	France	84.1392
5	Greece	83.2684
6	Switzerland	80.1315
7	Belarus	79.4584
8	Great Britain	76.9850
9	Israel	70.7897
10	Portugal	68.2817
