= Synchronised swimming at the 2013 World Aquatics Championships – Team technical routine =

World swimming championships 2013

Team technical routine at the Synchronised swimming at the 2013 World Aquatics Championships
- Dates: 20 July (preliminary round); 22 July (Final)
- Competitors: 128 from 16 nations
- Winning points: 96.600

Medalists
gold medal	Vlada Chigireva; Daria Korobova; Alexandra Patskevich; Elena Prokofyeva; Alla Shishkina; Maria Shurochkina; Angelika Timanina; Alexandra Zueva; Mikhaela Kalancha (reserve); Anisya Olkhova (reserve)	Russia
silver medal	Clara Basiana; Alba María Cabello; Ona Carbonell; Margalida Crespí; Thaïs Henríquez; Paula Klamburg; Meritxell Mas; Cristina Salvador; Clara Camacho (reserve); Sara Levy (reserve)	Spain
bronze medal	Lolita Ananasova; Olena Grechykhina; Ganna Klymenko; Kateryna Reznik; Oleksandra Sabada; Kateryna Sadurska; Anastasiya Savchuk; Anna Voloshyna; Maryna Golyadkina (reserve); Olha Zolotarova (reserve)	Ukraine

:Barcelona Palau San Jordi

The team technical routine competition at 2013 World Aquatics Championships was held on July 20–22 with the preliminary round on July 20 and the final on July 22.

== Results ==
The preliminary round was held on July 20 at 14:00 and the final on July 22 at 19:00.

Green denotes finalists

Rank	Nation	Preliminary		Final	
Rank	Nation	Points	Rank	Points	Rank
1st place, gold medalist(s)	Russia	96.500	1	96.600	1
2nd place, silver medalist(s)	Spain	94.700	2	94.400	2
3rd place, bronze medalist(s)	Ukraine	93.200	3	93.300	3
4	Japan	92.200	4	92.200	4
5	Canada	90.100	5	90.300	5
6	Italy	89.600	6	89.900	6
7	France	87.100	7	87.200	7
8	Greece	86.300	8	86.400	8
9	North Korea	83.800	11	84.300	9
10	Brazil	84.600	9	84.000	10
11	Mexico	84.100	10	83.700	11
12	Netherlands	81.800	12	81.700	12
13	Kazakhstan	81.600	13		
14	Egypt	77.000	14		
15	Singapore	69.800	15		
16	Costa Rica	63.400	16		
