= Synchronised swimming at the 2013 World Aquatics Championships – Team free routine =

Team free routine at the Synchronised swimming at the 2013 World Aquatics Championships
- Dates: 23 July (preliminary round); 26 July (Final)
- Competitors: 126 from 17 nations
- Winning points: 97.400

Medalists
gold medal	Vlada Chigireva; Svetlana Kolesnichenko; Daria Korobova; Alexandra Patskevich; Elena Prokofyeva; Alla Shishkina; Maria Shurochkina; Angelika Timanina; Anisya Olkhova (reserve); Alexandra Zueva (reserve)	Russia
silver medal	Clara Basiana; Alba María Cabello; Ona Carbonell; Margalida Crespí; Thaïs Henríquez; Paula Klamburg; Sara Levy; Meritxell Mas; Laia Pons (reserve); Cristina Salvador (reserve)	Spain
bronze medal	Lolita Ananasova; Olena Grechykhina; Ganna Klymenko; Oleksandra Sabada; Kateryna Sadurska; Anastasiya Savchuk; Anna Voloshyna; Olha Zolotarova; Kateryna Reznik (reserve); Maryna Golyadkina (reserve)	Ukraine

Barcelona Palau San Jordi

The team free routine competition at 2013 World Aquatics Championships was held on July 23–26 with the preliminary round on July 23 and the final on July 26.

== Results ==
The preliminary round was held on July 23 at 18:00 and the final at 19:00 on July 26.

Green denotes finalists

Rank	Nation	Preliminary		Final	
Rank	Nation	Points	Rank	Points	Rank
1st place, gold medalist(s)	Russia	97.390	1	97.400	1
2nd place, silver medalist(s)	Spain	94.100	2	94.230	2
3rd place, bronze medalist(s)	Ukraine	93.100	3	93.640	3
4	Japan	91.670	4	91.950	4
5	Italy	89.880	5	89.840	5
6	Canada	88.180	6	88.620	6
7	France	86.510	7	87.080	7
8	Greece	85.510	8	85.060	8
9	Mexico	83.850	9	84.430	9
10	Brazil	83.240	10	83.520	10
11	Great Britain	82.510	11	82.570	11
12	Switzerland	82.290	12	82.680	12
13	Kazakhstan	78.180	13		
14	Egypt	76.460	14		
15	Singapore	67.960	15		
16	Macau	66.790	16		
17	Costa Rica	62.190	17		
