= Synchronised swimming at the 2016 European Aquatics Championships – Team free routine =

Team free routine at the 2016 European Aquatics Championships
- Dates: 11–13 May
- Competitors: 80 from 10 nations
- Teams: 10
- Winning points: 93.8000

Medalists
gold medal	Lolita Ananasova; Olena Grechykhina; Daria Iushko; Oleksandra Sabada; Kateryna Sadurska; Anastasiya Savchuk; Kseniya Sydorenko; Anna Voloshyna; Oleksandra Kashuba (reserve); Olga Kondrashova (reserve); Kateryna Reznik (reserve); Olha Zolotarova (reserve)	Ukraine
silver medal	Elisa Bozzo; Beatrice Callegari; Camilla Cattaneo; Linda Cerruti; Francesca Deidda; Costanza Ferro; Manila Flamini; Mariangela Perrupato; Sara Sgarzi; Costanza Di Camillo (reserve); Gemma Galli (reserve)	Italy
bronze medal	Alba María Cabello; Clara Camacho; Helena Jauma; Cecilia Jiménez; Carmen Juárez; Meritxell Mas; Paula Ramírez; Cristina Salvador; Berta Ferreras (reserve)	Spain

The Team free routine competition of the 2016 European Aquatics Championships was held on 11 and 13 May 2016.

== Results ==
The preliminary round was held at 09:00. The final was held on 13 May at 16:00.

Rank	Nation	Preliminary		Final	
Rank	Nation	Points	Rank	Points	Rank
1st place, gold medalist(s)	Ukraine	93.8000	1	94.0000	1
2nd place, silver medalist(s)	Italy	91.8000	2	91.2333	2
3rd place, bronze medalist(s)	Spain	90.0333	3	89.6667	3
4	Greece	86.5667	4	87.4667	4
5	France	85.9667	5	85.3333	5
6	Switzerland	82.2333	6	83.0000	6
7	Belarus	80.8667	7	81.6667	7
8	Great Britain	78.9667	8	79.0000	8
9	Israel	75.1667	9	75.7333	9
10	Portugal	69.8667	10	71.8000	10
