= 2014 FINA Synchronized Swimming World Cup =

International synchronized swimming competition

The 13th FINA Synchronized Swimming World Cup was held October 2–5, 2014 in Quebec City, Canada. It featured swimmers from 17 nations, swimming in four events: Duet, Team, Free Combination, and Team Highlights.

== Participating nations ==
The 17 nations that swam at the 2014 Synchronized Swimming World Cup were:

- Australia
- Austria
- Belarus
- Brazil
- Canada
- China
- Czech Republic
- Egypt
- France
- Greece
- Italy
- Japan
- Kazakhstan
- Mexico
- Slovakia
- Switzerland
- Ukraine

== Results ==
Event	Gold		Silver		Bronze	
Duet	Huang Xuechen; Sun Wenyan; China	186.7041	Yukiko Inui; Risako Mitsui; Japan	181.5469	Lolita Ananasova; Anna Voloshyna; Ukraine	181.4274
Team	Yu Lele; Tang Mengni; Sun Yijing; Guo Li; Gu Xiao; Liang Xinping; Sun Wenyan; Li Xiaolu; China	188.0322	Yukiko Inui; Risako Mitsui; Miho Arai; Aika Hakoyama; Kurumi Yoshida; Kanami Nakamaki; Mayo Itoyama; Mai Nakamura; Japan	182.4088	Kseniya Sydorenko; Olga Kondrashova; Oleksandra Sabada; Anna Voloshyna; Lolita Ananasova; Kateryna Sadurska; Anastasiya Savchuk; Olesya Zaytseva; Ukraine	181.9573
Free Combination	Yu Lele; Tang Mengni; Sun Yijing; Guo Li; Gu Xiao; Liang Xinping; Sun Wenyan; Li Xiaolu; Huang Xuechen; Chen Xiaojun; China	95.4000	Yukiko Inui; Risako Mitsui; Miho Arai; Aika Hakoyama; Kurumi Yoshida; Kanami Nakamaki; Mayo Itoyama; Mai Nakamura; Kei Marumo; Natsumi Miyazaki; Japan	92.2667	Kseniya Sydorenko; Olena Grechykhina; Oleksandra Sabada; Anna Voloshyna; Lolita Ananasova; Kateryna Sadurska; Anastasiya Savchuk; Kateryna Reznik; Oleksandra Kashuba; Olha Zolotarova; Ukraine	91.8000
Team Highlight	Kseniya Sydorenko; Olga Kondrashova; Oleksandra Sabada; Olha Zolotarova; Anna Voloshyna; Lolita Ananasova; Olena Grechykhina; Kateryna Sadurska; Anastasiya Savchuk; Kateryna Reznik; Ukraine	93.1333	Marie-Lou Morin; Sandy Gill; Annabelle Frappier; Claudia Holzner; Gabriella Brisson; Lisa Sanders; Lisa Mikelberg; Kaylene Scheil; Samantha Nealon; Rebecca Maule; Canada	90.0000	Nuria Diosdado; Isabel Delgado; Karem Achach; Joana Jimenez; Sofia Rios; Mariana Cifuentes; Evelyn Guajardo; Luisa Rodriguez; Mexico	86.0000
