= Synchronised swimming at the 2013 World Aquatics Championships – Free routine combination =

Free routine combination at the Synchronised swimming at the 2013 World Aquatics Championships
- Dates: 21 July (preliminary round); 27 July (Final)
- Competitors: 126 from 17 nations
- Winning points: 97.060

Medalists
gold medal	Vlada Chigireva; Mikhaela Kalancha; Daria Korobova; Anisya Olkhova; Alexandra Patskevich; Elena Prokofyeva; Alla Shishkina; Maria Shurochkina; Angelika Timanina; Alexandra Zueva; Svetlana Kolesnichenko (reserve)	Russia
silver medal	Clara Basiana; Alba María Cabello; Ona Carbonell; Margalida Crespí; Thaïs Henríquez; Paula Klamburg; Sara Levy; Meritxell Mas; Laia Pons; Cristina Salvador; Clara Camacho (reserve); Irene Montrucchio (reserve)	Spain
bronze medal	Lolita Ananasova; Maryna Golyadkina; Olena Grechykhina; Ganna Klymenko; Kateryna Reznik; Oleksandra Sabada; Kateryna Sadurska; Anastasiya Savchuk; Anna Voloshyna; Olha Zolotarova; Vira Golubova (reserve); Dana-Mariia Klymenko (reserve)	Ukraine

Barcelona Palau San Jordi

The free routine combination competition at 2013 World Aquatics Championships was held on July 21–27 with the preliminary round on July 21 and the final on July 27.

== Results ==
The preliminary round was held on July 21 at 14:00 and the final on July 27 at 19:00.

Green denotes finalists

Rank	Nation	Preliminary		Final	
Rank	Nation	Points	Rank	Points	Rank
1st place, gold medalist(s)	Russia	96.740	1	97.060	1
2nd place, silver medalist(s)	Spain	94.040	2	94.620	2
3rd place, bronze medalist(s)	Ukraine	92.860	3	93.350	3
4	Japan	91.590	4	92.020	4
5	Canada	91.280	5	90.410	5
6	Italy	89.030	6	89.550	6
7	Greece	87.470	7	86.850	7
8	France	87.080	8	86.820	8
9	Mexico	84.240	9	84.530	9
10	North Korea	83.790	10	83.560	10
11	Switzerland	82.420	12	82.310	11
12	Netherlands	83.220	11	82.070	12
13	Belarus	79.580	13		
14	Kazakhstan	78.600	14		
15	New Zealand	70.600	15		
16	Macau	69.950	16		
17	Thailand	58.730	17		
