= Synchronised swimming at the 2014 European Aquatics Championships – Team routine =

Team routine at the Synchronised swimming at the 2014 European Aquatics Championships
- Dates: 13–16 August
- Competitors: 96 from 12 nations

Medalists
gold medal	Vlada Chigireva; Svetlana Kolesnichenko; Anisya Olkhova; Elena Prokofyeva; Alla Shishkina; Maria Shurochkina; Gelena Topilina; Darina Valitova; Liliia Nizamova (reserve); Mikhaela Kalancha (reserve)	Russia
silver medal	Lolita Ananasova; Olena Grechykhina; Olga Kondrashova; Oleksandra Sabada; Kateryna Sadurska; Anastasiya Savchuk; Kseniya Sydorenko; Anna Voloshyna; Oleksandra Kashuba (reserve); Dana-Mariia Klymenko (reserve); Kateryna Reznik (reserve); Olha Zolotarova (reserve)	Ukraine
bronze medal	Clara Basiana; Alba María Cabello; Ona Carbonell; Margalida Crespí; Sara Levy; Meritxell Mas; Cristina Salvador; Paula Klamburg; Clara Camacho (reserve); Cecilia Jiménez (reserve)	Spain

The Team routine competition of the 2014 European Aquatics Championships was held on 13–16 August.

== Results ==
The technical round was held at 19:00 on 13 August. The free round was held at 18:00 on 14 August. The final was held at 18:00 on 16 August.

Rank	Nationality	Technical		Free		Preliminary		Final	
Rank	Nationality	Points	Rank	Points	Rank	Points	Rank	Points	Rank
1st place, gold medalist(s)	Russia	92.9268	1	96.0333	1	188.9601	1	96.8333	1
2nd place, silver medalist(s)	Ukraine	90.0817	2	92.7000	2	182.7817	2	94.0667	2
3rd place, bronze medalist(s)	Spain	90.0133	3	91.7667	3	181.7800	3	92.4667	3
4	Italy	86.1961	4	88.9333	4	175.1294	4	89.8000	4
5	France	83.2994	5	85.9000	5	169.1994	5	86.5667	5
6	Greece	81.1539	6	83.9667	6	165.1206	6	84.8333	6
7	Belarus	78.3729	7	81.2333	7	159.6062	7	82.7667	7
8	Switzerland	76.9543	8	79.4667	8	156.4210	8	80.0333	8
9	Germany	74.5083	9	77.1000	9	151.6083	9	78.5333	9
10	Great Britain	72.7617	10	75.3333	10	148.0950	10	75.9667	10
11	Hungary	72.5726	11	73.1000	11	145.6726	11	73.0333	11
12	Turkey	70.2608	12	71.5333	12	141.7941	12	72.9000	12
