= Synchronised swimming at the 2016 European Aquatics Championships – Solo technical routine =

Solo free routine at the 2016 European Aquatics Championships
- Dates: 12 May
- Competitors: 17 from 17 nations
- Winning points: 93.8865

Medalists
gold medal	Svetlana Romashina	Russia
silver medal	Anna Voloshyna	Ukraine
bronze medal	Linda Cerruti	Italy

The Solo technical routine competition of the 2016 European Aquatics Championships was held on 12 May 2016.

== Results ==
The final was held at 09:00.

Rank	Swimmers	Nationality	
Rank	Swimmers	Nationality	Points
1st place, gold medalist(s)	Svetlana Romashina	Russia	93.8865
2nd place, silver medalist(s)	Anna Voloshyna	Ukraine	90.7289
3rd place, bronze medalist(s)	Linda Cerruti	Italy	87.1493
4	Evangelia Platanioti	Greece	86.0587
5	Cristina Salvador	Spain	85.5766
6	Anastasia Gloushkov	Israel	83.9223
7	Vasiliki Alexandri	Austria	83.2970
8	Estel-Anaïs Hubaud	France	83.1091
9	Sascia Kraus	Switzerland	80.4545
10	Olivia Allison	Great Britain	79.2639
11	Margot de Graaf	Netherlands	77.9689
12	Marlene Bojer	Germany	75.6986
13	Mia Šestan	Croatia	72.4361
14	Hristina Damyanova	Bulgaria	72.3917
15	Nea Hannula	Finland	69.5557
16	Nevena Dimitrijević	Serbia	69.1898
17	Ana Baptista	Portugal	66.4256
