= Darina Valitova =

Russian synchronized swimmer

Personal information
- Nationality: Russian
- Born: 9 February 1997 (age 29) Moscow, Russia

Sport
- Sport: Synchronized swimming
Medal record
Representing Russia
Synchronized swimming
World Championships
Gold medal – first place	2015 Kazan	Free routine combination
Gold medal – first place	2015 Kazan	Mixed duet free
Gold medal – first place	2017 Budapest	Team technical routine
Gold medal – first place	2017 Budapest	Team free routine
Silver medal – second place	2015 Kazan	Mixed duet technical
European Championships
Gold medal – first place	2014 Berlin	Team
Gold medal – first place	2016 London	Team technical routine
Gold medal – first place	2016 London	Combination routine
Gold medal – first place	2018 Glasgow	Team free routine
Gold medal – first place	2018 Glasgow	Team technical routine
European Junior Championships
Gold medal – first place	2013 Poznań	Duet
Gold medal – first place	2013 Poznań	Free routine combination
Gold medal – first place	2013 Poznań	Team

Darina Ryashidovna Valitova (Russian: Дарина Ряшидовна Валитова; born 9 February 1997) is a Russian competitor in Solo and Mixed Duet synchronized swimming. Together with Aleksandr Maltsev, she won a gold medal in the inaugural mixed duet competition at the 2015 World Championships.

== Career ==
Valitova has been member of the Russian national team since 2007. In 2008, she took the 3rd place in duo combination at the Moscow Championships. She became multiple junior champion of Russia in duo and group from 2009 to 2011. In 2012, she won gold in duo combination. At the 2013 European Junior Championships in Poznań, Poland, Valitova won 3 gold medals in Duet, Free Routine Combination and Team competition.

In 2014, Valitova began competing as a Senior, and she was a member of the Russian Team that won gold at the 2014 European Championships. In November 2014, FINA officially approved of adding mixed-gender events in Synchronized swimming and diving under its banner after a vote at the Extraordinary Congress in Doha Qatar. Valitova began pairing up with Aleksandr Maltsev. They competed at the Italian Open Test for mixed duet where they took the gold medal.

At the 2015 World Aquatics Championships in Kazan, Valitova/Maltsev represented Russia at the inaugural Mixed Duet in synchronized swimming, after leading the preliminaries in Mixed Duet technical, they finished second in the finals losing just 0.2122 points to Americans Bill May and Christina Jones. They avenged their loss by winning the gold in Mixed Duet free with a score of 91.7333 points ahead of Lum/May.
