= Mariangela Perrupato =

Italian synchronized swimmer

Personal information
- Nationality: Italian
- Born: 15 September 1988 (age 37) Castrovillari, Italy
- Height: 1.70 m (5 ft 7 in)

Sport
- Sport: Swimming
- Strokes: Synchronized swimming
Medal record
World Championships
Silver medal – second place	2017 Budapest	Mixed duet free
Bronze medal – third place	2015 Kazan	Mixed duet free routine
European Championships
Silver medal – second place	2008 Eindhoven	Combination routine
Silver medal – second place	2008 Eindhoven	Team
Silver medal – second place	2016 London	Team free routine
Silver medal – second place	2016 London	Mixed free routine
Bronze medal – third place	2006 Budapest	Combination routine
Bronze medal – third place	2006 Budapest	Team
Bronze medal – third place	2012 Eindhoven	Combination routine
Bronze medal – third place	2012 Eindhoven	Team
Bronze medal – third place	2014 Berlin	Combination routine
Bronze medal – third place	2016 London	Team technical routine
Bronze medal – third place	2016 London	Combination routine

Mariangela Perrupato (born 15 September 1988) is an Italian synchronized swimmer. She competed in the women's duet with Giulia Lapi at the 2012 Summer Olympics, finishing in 7th place. She was part of the Italian team in the team event at the 2016 Summer Olympics finishing 5th.

== Biography ==
She began synchronised swimming at the age of 6. She made her senior international debut for Italy in 2006 at the European Championships in Budapest, where she won bronze in the duet. She had already won medals at junior level, winning a silver in the team event at the 2004 European Junior Synchronised Swimming Championships in Osweicim. In November 2016, she suffered a herniated disc.

Perrupato an athlete of the Gruppo Sportivo Fiamme Oro.
