= Synchronised swimming at the 2014 European Aquatics Championships – Solo routine =

Solo routine at the Synchronised swimming at the 2014 European Aquatics Championships
- Dates: 13–17 August
- Competitors: 15 from 15 nations
- Winning time: 95.8333

Medalists
gold medal	Svetlana Romashina	Russia
silver medal	Ona Carbonell	Spain
bronze medal	Anna Voloshyna	Ukraine

The Solo routine competition of the 2014 European Aquatics Championships was held on 13–17 August.

== Results ==
The technical round was held at 09:00 on 13 August. The free round was held at 10:00 on 15 August. The final was held at 10:00 on 17 August.

Green denotes finalists

Rank	Swimmer	Nationality	Technical		Free		Preliminary		Final	
Rank	Swimmer	Nationality	Points	Rank	Points	Rank	Points	Rank	Points	Rank
1st place, gold medalist(s)	Svetlana Romashina	Russia	93.8251	1	95.5000	1	189.3251	1	95.8333	1
2nd place, silver medalist(s)	Ona Carbonell	Spain	91.7774	2	92.5667	2	184.3441	2	93.7000	2
3rd place, bronze medalist(s)	Anna Voloshyna	Ukraine	89.5008	3	92.0000	3	181.5008	3	92.3333	3
4	Linda Cerruti	Italy	85.5838	4	88.9333	4	174.5171	4	89.4333	4
5	Anastasia Gloushkov	Israel	83.4595	6	86.6000	5	170.0595	6	89.0667	5
6	Evangelia Platanioti	Greece	84.5080	5	85.9000	6	170.4080	5	87.8333	6
7	Margaux Chretien	France	81.9529	7	85.4000	7	167.3529	7	86.4667	7
8	Soňa Bernardová	Czech Republic	81.7270	9	83.4333	8	165.1603	8	84.0000	8
9	Nadine Brandl	Austria	81.7303	8	81.8333	9	163.5636	9	82.0000	9
10	Margot de Graaf	Netherlands	79.9347	10	80.4000	10	160.3347	10	81.6000	10
11	Kyra Felssner	Germany	77.8959	11	78.2000	11	156.0959	11	79.4333	11
12	Jana Labáthová	Slovakia	74.4647	12	77.3333	12	151.7980	12	78.6667	12
13	Kalina Yordanova	Bulgaria	73.4854	13	72.0667	15	145.5521	13		
14	Genevieve Randall	Great Britain	70.7771	15	74.0667	13	144.8438	14		
15	Rebecca Domika	Croatia	70.8678	14	72.2000	14	143.0678	15		
