= Clara Basiana =

Spanish synchronized swimmer

Personal information
- Born: 23 January 1991 (age 35) Barcelona, Spain

Sport
- Sport: Synchronised swimming
Medal record
Representing Spain
Olympic Games
Bronze medal – third place	2012 London	Team
World Championships
Silver medal – second place	2013 Barcelona	Team technical
Silver medal – second place	2013 Barcelona	Team free
Silver medal – second place	2013 Barcelona	Routine combination
Bronze medal – third place	2011 Shanghai	Team technical
Bronze medal – third place	2011 Shanghai	Team free
European Championships
Gold medal – first place	2012 Eindhoven	Team routine
Gold medal – first place	2012 Eindhoven	Combination routine
Silver medal – second place	2014 Berlin	Combination routine
Bronze medal – third place	2014 Berlin	Team routine

Clara Basiana Cañellas (Note: In this Spanish name, the first or paternal surname is Basiana and the second or maternal family name is Cañellas.) (born 23 January 1991) is a Spanish former synchronized swimmer. She won a bronze medal in the team competition at the 2012 Summer Olympics. Cañellas retired in 2016, after Spain did not qualify for the Olympics.

== Career ==
=== Junior ===
Basiana won a silver medal in team and combo at the 2007 Calella European Championships. She won a silver medal in team and combo at the 2008 Angers European Championships, and a bronze medal in team and combo and a silver medal for duet at the 2009 Gloucester European Championships.

=== Senior ===
Basiana won a gold medal in combo at the 2009 Rome World Championships. She won a silver medal in team and combo at the 2010 Budapest European Championships. She won a bronze medal in team tech and team free at the 2011 Shanghai World Championships.

She won a bronze medal in team at the 2012 London Olympic Games. She won a gold medal in team and combo at the Eindhoven European Championships, and a silver medal in team tech, team free and combo at the 2013 Barcelona World Championships.

== Post-career controversy ==
While serving as television commentator for TV3, the state broadcaster of Catalonia, for an Olympic qualifying event, Basiana said the Israeli team's presence in the competition "is another strategy for whitewash the genocide and violations of human rights that they're committing against the Palestinian people.... We've seen it repeatedly in Eurovision, and it’s as though the war crimes of the State of Israel are erased and we’d like to point this out to the viewers so as not to normalize it."

Basiana was praised by some for speaking about alleged Israeli human rights violations. However, others said that she improperly conflated politics and sport, and noted that imputing Israeli governmental policies to Israeli athletes was equivalent to associating Basiana, a former Spanish national team member, with abusive Spanish practices in Catalonia. Critics also observed that Basiana gave no comment on the human rights issues surrounding the second-place Belarusian team, even though the tournament occurred shortly after Belarus' high-profile hijacking of Ryanair Flight 4978. Daniel Sirera, former chairman of the People's Party in Catalonia, tweeted that Basiana had engaged in “unethical behavior by dragging politics into sports.” A letter was sent to the CEO of the Catalyunya Comunicacio conglomerate, which includes TV3, on behalf of US Senator Joe Lieberman and human-rights activist Natan Sharansky demanded disciplinary action against Basiana. Laura Baladas, Ombudswoman of the Catalonia public broadcasting authority Corporació Catalana de Mitjans Audiovisuals said that Basiana had violated its standards and that her comments "cannot be justified," offered a formal apology, and said that measures had been taken by the management of Televisió de Catalunya to avoid offensive remarks going forward.
