= 2010 FINA World Junior Synchronized Swimming Championships =

Swimming event

The 12th FINA World Junior Synchronised Swimming Championships was held August 9–15, 2010 in Indianapolis, USA. The synchronised swimmers are aged between 15 and 18 years old, from 25 nations, swimming in four events: Solo, Duet, Team and Free combination.

== Participating nations ==
25 nations swam at the 2010 World Junior Championships were:

- Argentina
- Belarus
- Brazil
- Canada
- China
- Colombia
- Czech Republic
- Finland
- France
- Germany
- Greece
- Hungary
- Israel
- Italy
- Japan
- Kazakhstan
- Mexico
- Russia
- Singapore
- Slovakia
- Spain
- Switzerland
- Ukraine
- Uzbekistan
- USA

== Results ==
| Event | Gold | | Silver | | Bronze | |
|---|---|---|---|---|---|---|
| Solo details | Vlada Chigireva; Russia | 171.548 | Lolita Ananasova; Ukraine | 166.708 | Emilia Kopcik; Canada | 165.277 |
| Duet details | Milena Miteva; Elena Prokofeva; Russia | 171.297 | Lolita Ananasova; Kateryna Sadurska; Ukraine | 166.472 | Rachel Fréchette; Emilia Kopcik; Canada | 164.093 |
| Team details | Russia | 170.486 | China | 162.858 | Canada | 162.260 |
| Free combination details | Russia | 91.840 | Ukraine | 90.250 | China | 89.710 |
