= Vlada Chigireva =

Russian synchronized swimmer

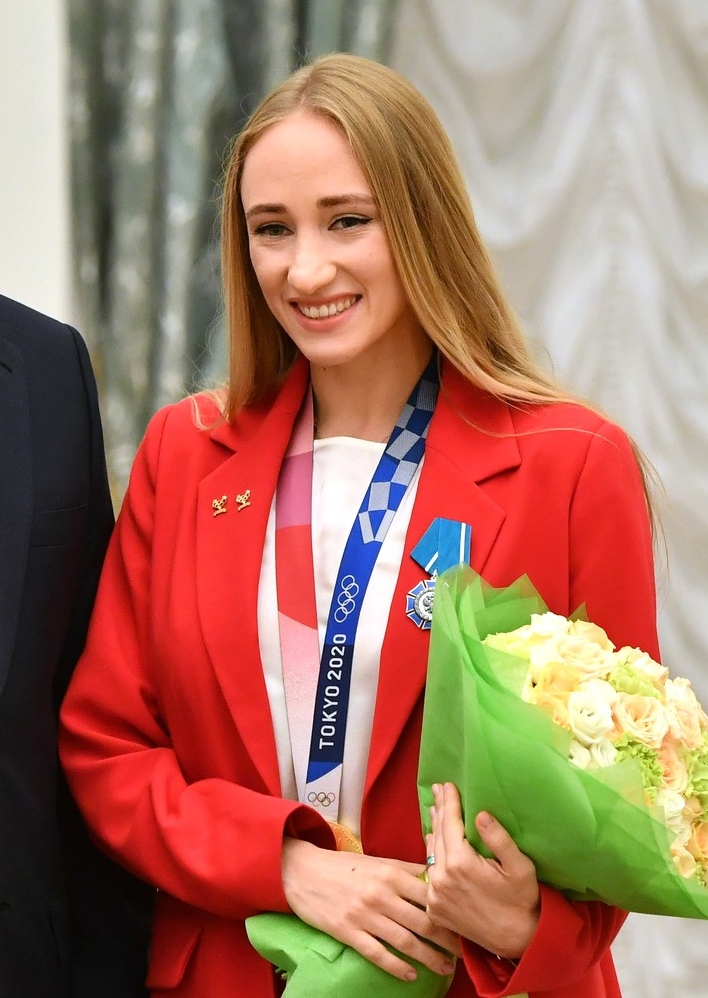
- Chigireva in 2021

Personal information
- Full name: Vlada Alexandrovna Chigireva
- National team: Russia
- Born: 18 December 1994 (age 31) Rostov-on-Don, Russia
- Height: 1.62 m (5 ft 4 in)
- Weight: 48 kg (106 lb)

Sport
- Sport: Swimming
- Strokes: Synchronised swimming
- Club: MGFSO
- Coach: Tatiana Pokrovskaya; Yelena Polyanskaya; Marina Terekhova
Medal record
Representing (Russia) ROC
Olympic Games
Gold medal – first place	2020 Tokyo	Team
Representing Russia
Olympic Games
Gold medal – first place	2016 Rio de Janeiro	Team
World Championships
Gold medal – first place	2013 Barcelona	Team technical routine
Gold medal – first place	2013 Barcelona	Team free routine
Gold medal – first place	2013 Barcelona	Free routine combination
Gold medal – first place	2015 Kazan	Team technical routine
Gold medal – first place	2015 Kazan	Team free routine
Gold medal – first place	2015 Kazan	Free routine combination
Gold medal – first place	2017 Budapest	Team technical routine
Gold medal – first place	2017 Budapest	Team free routine
Gold medal – first place	2019 Gwangju	Team technical routine
Gold medal – first place	2019 Gwangju	Team free routine
Gold medal – first place	2019 Gwangju	Free routine combination
European Championships
Gold medal – first place	2014 Berlin	Team
Gold medal – first place	2016 London	Team technical routine
Gold medal – first place	2016 London	Free routine combination
Gold medal – first place	2020 Budapest	Team technical routine
Summer Universiade
Gold medal – first place	2013 Kazan	Team
Gold medal – first place	2013 Kazan	Free routine combination

Vlada Alexandrovna Chigireva (Russian: Влада Александровна Чигирёва, IPA: [ˈvladə ɐlʲɪkˈsandrəvnə tɕɪɡʲɪˈrʲɵvə]; born 18 December 1994) is a Russian competitor in synchronised swimming.

Chigireva won six gold medals at World Aquatics Championships: three in 2013 and three in 2015. She was also the solo and team champion in both the 2010 and the 2012 FINA World Junior Synchronised Swimming Championships. She also won a gold medal at the 2014 European Aquatics Championships, as well as two gold medals at the 2013 Summer Universiade. She missed the 2018 European Championships due to a knee injury in 2017 that required surgery.

Chigireva spent much time in a pool since early age, as her mother is a swimming coach, and took up swimming aged five. She has a degree in sports psychology from the Russian State University of Physical Education, Sport, Youth and Tourism.
