= Ganna Khmelnytska =

Ukrainian synchronised swimmer

Personal information
- Nationality: Ukrainian
- Born: 24 August 1988 (age 37) Kharkiv, Ukrainian SSR, Soviet Union

Sport
- Sport: Swimming
- Strokes: Synchronised swimming
Medal record
Women's synchronised swimming
Representing Ukraine
Event	1st	2nd	3rd
European Championships	0	1	2
European Junior Championships	0	0	1
Total	0	1	3
European Championships
Silver medal – second place	2012 Eindhoven	Combination routine
Bronze medal – third place	2008 Eindhoven	Team routine
Bronze medal – third place	2008 Eindhoven	Combination routine
European Junior Championships
Bronze medal – third place	2006 Bonn	Free routine combination

Ganna Khmelnytska (Ukrainian: Ганна Хмельницька; born 24 August 1988 in Kharkiv, Ukraine) is a retired Ukrainian synchronised swimmer.

== Career ==
In 2006, Ganna Khmelnytska won a bronze medal in free routine combination event at the 2006 European Junior Synchronised Swimming Championships, held in Bonn.

She competed at the 2005 World Aquatics Championships, 2007 World Aquatics Championships and also in 2009 World Aquatics Championships without reaching any medals.

The following years, Anastasiya competed at the 2008 European Aquatics Championships, held in Eindhoven, where she received two bronze medals in team free routine and free routine combination events.

In 2010, Ganna competed at the FINA Synchro World Trophy 2010, held in Russia, where she received a bronze medal in team thematic routine event.

Also she competed at the 2012 European Aquatics Championships, held in Eindhoven, where she won a silver medal in team combination routine event.

Since 2013 she is a synchronized swimming coach of sport society SincroGifa Palermo in Palermo, Italy.
