= Maria Shurochkina =

Russian synchronized swimmer

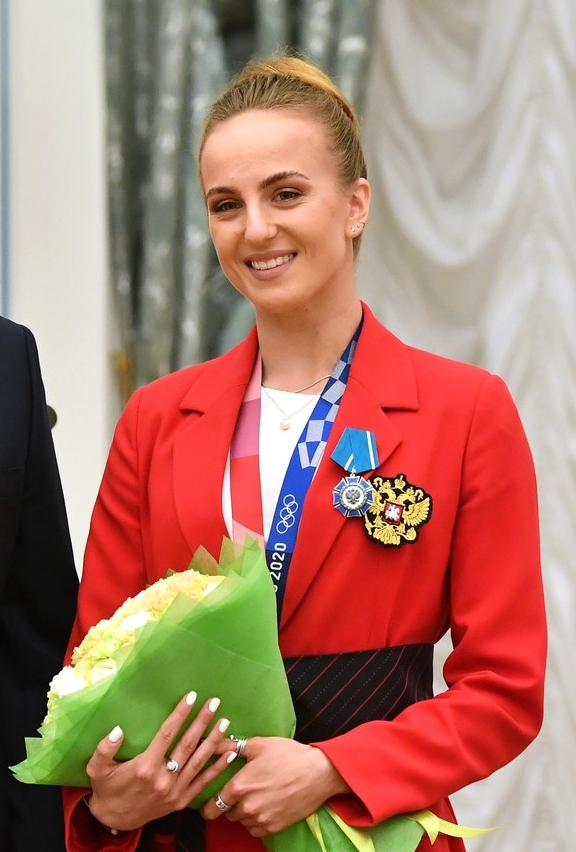
- Shurochkina in 2021

Personal information
- Full name: Maria Vladimirovna Shurochkina
- National team: Russia
- Born: 30 June 1995 (age 31) Moscow, Russia
- Height: 1.64 m (5 ft 5 in)
- Weight: 48 kg (106 lb)

Sport
- Sport: Swimming
- Strokes: Synchronised swimming
- Club: MGFSO
- Coach: Tatiana Pokrovskaya; Yekaterina Piskareva; Yelena Polyanskaya
Medal record
Representing (Russia) ROC
Olympic Games
| Gold medal – first place | 2020 Tokyo | Team |
Representing Russia
Olympic Games
| Gold medal – first place | 2016 Rio de Janeiro | Team |
World Championships
| Gold medal – first place | 2013 Barcelona | Team technical routine |
| Gold medal – first place | 2013 Barcelona | Team free routine |
| Gold medal – first place | 2013 Barcelona | Free routine combination |
| Gold medal – first place | 2015 Kazan | Team technical routine |
| Gold medal – first place | 2015 Kazan | Team free routine |
| Gold medal – first place | 2015 Kazan | Free routine combination |
| Gold medal – first place | 2017 Budapest | Team technical routine |
| Gold medal – first place | 2017 Budapest | Team free routine |
| Gold medal – first place | 2019 Gwangju | Team technical routine |
| Gold medal – first place | 2019 Gwangju | Team free routine |
| Gold medal – first place | 2019 Gwangju | Free routine combination |
European Championships
| Gold medal – first place | 2014 Berlin | Team |
| Gold medal – first place | 2016 London | Team technical routine |
| Gold medal – first place | 2016 London | Free routine combination |
| Gold medal – first place | 2018 Glasgow | Team free routine |
| Gold medal – first place | 2018 Glasgow | Team technical routine |
| Gold medal – first place | 2020 Budapest | Team technical routine |
Summer Universiade
| Gold medal – first place | 2013 Kazan | Team |
| Gold medal – first place | 2013 Kazan | Free routine combination |

Maria Vladimirovna Shurochkina (Russian: Мария Владимировна Шурочкина, IPA: [mɐˈrʲijə ˈʂurətɕkʲɪnə]; born 30 June 1995) is a Russian competitor in synchronised swimming.

== Career ==
She has won six gold medals at World Aquatics Championships, three in 2013 and three in 2015. She also won a gold medal at the 2014 European Aquatics Championships, as well as two gold medals at the 2013 Summer Universiade.

In 2017 Shurochkina had opened her dance school in Moscow.

== Personal life ==
Her father, Vladimir Shurochkin, is a musician and music producer, and former member of boyband Laskovyi Mai. Her mother, Oksana Baranovskaya, is a former competitive artistic gymnast. Shurochkina is the younger paternal sister of pop superstar Nyusha. She also has a younger brother, Ivan.

=== Hospitalization ===
On 8 November 2026, Shurochkina was injured in a fire caused by a flare-up of biofuel vapors used to fuel a bio-fireplace at her apartment on the 17th floor of the Svoy residential complex on Bagritskogo Street in Moscow. She was hospitalized in serious condition in the intensive care unit of the Sklifosovsky Institute for Emergency Medicine with second- and third-degree burns to her chest, abdomen, arms, and hands, covering up to 32% of her body, circulatory disorder, and tissue necrosis.

On 18 November, Shurochkina was transferred from intensive care to a burn unit, where she is undergoing intravenous therapy with antibiotics and analgesics administered via a venous catheter in her neck.

== Awards ==
- Honored Master of Sports of Russia (31 December 2013).
- Order of Friendship (25 August 2016) – for outstanding sports achievements at the Games XXXI Olympiad in 2016 in the city of Rio de Janeiro (Brazil), manifested the will to win and determination.
- Russian Federation Presidential Certificate of Honour (19 July 2013) – for outstanding sports achievements at the XXVII World Summer Universiade 2013 in Kazan.
- Order of Honour (11 September 2021)
