= Ona Carbonell =

Spanish synchronized swimmer

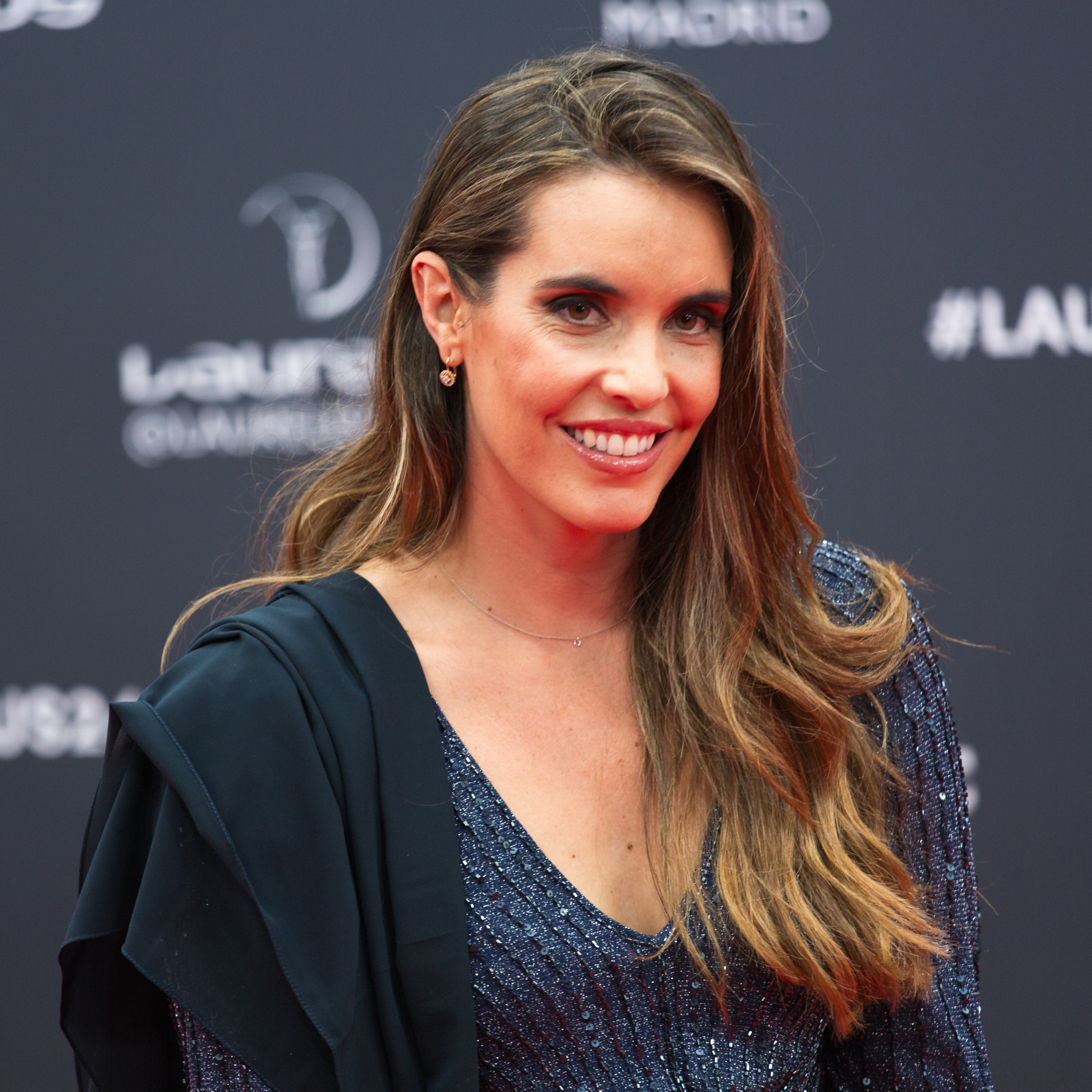
- Carbonell in 2024

Personal information
- Full name: Ona Carbonell Ballestero
- Born: 5 June 1990 (age 36) Barcelona, Spain
- Height: 1.74 m (5 ft 9 in)
- Weight: 54 kg (119 lb)

Sport
- Sport: Swimming
- Strokes: Synchronized swimming
- Club: CN Sabadell
Medal record
Synchronized swimming
Representing Spain
Event	1st	2nd	3rd
Olympic Games	0	1	1
World Championships	1	11	11
European Championships	3	6	3
Total	4	18	15
Olympic Games
Silver medal – second place	2012 London	Duet
Bronze medal – third place	2012 London	Team
World Championships
Gold medal – first place	2009 Rome	Free combination
Silver medal – second place	2007 Melbourne	Team free
Silver medal – second place	2009 Rome	Team technical
Silver medal – second place	2009 Rome	Team free
Silver medal – second place	2013 Barcelona	Team technical
Silver medal – second place	2013 Barcelona	Team free
Silver medal – second place	2013 Barcelona	Routine combination
Silver medal – second place	2015 Kazan	Solo technical routine
Silver medal – second place	2017 Budapest	Solo technical routine
Silver medal – second place	2017 Budapest	Solo free routine
Silver medal – second place	2019 Gwangju	Solo technical routine
Silver medal – second place	2019 Gwangju	Solo free routine
Bronze medal – third place	2007 Melbourne	Team technical
Bronze medal – third place	2011 Shanghai	Duet technical
Bronze medal – third place	2011 Shanghai	Duet free
Bronze medal – third place	2011 Shanghai	Team technical
Bronze medal – third place	2011 Shanghai	Team free
Bronze medal – third place	2013 Barcelona	Solo technical
Bronze medal – third place	2013 Barcelona	Duet technical
Bronze medal – third place	2013 Barcelona	Solo free
Bronze medal – third place	2013 Barcelona	Duet free
Bronze medal – third place	2015 Kazan	Solo free routine
Bronze medal – third place	2019 Gwangju	Highlight routine
European Championships
Gold medal – first place	2008 Eindhoven	Team
Gold medal – first place	2012 Debrecen	Team
Gold medal – first place	2012 Debrecen	Combination
Silver medal – second place	2010 Budapest	Duet
Silver medal – second place	2010 Budapest	Team
Silver medal – second place	2010 Budapest	Combination
Silver medal – second place	2012 Debrecen	Duet
Silver medal – second place	2014 Berlin	Solo routine
Silver medal – second place	2014 Berlin	Combination routine
Bronze medal – third place	2014 Berlin	Duet routine
Bronze medal – third place	2014 Berlin	Team routine
Bronze medal – third place	2020 Budapest	Team technical routine

Ona Carbonell Ballestero (born 5 June 1990) is a Spanish synchronized swimmer.

Carbonell competed at the 2012 Summer Olympics, where she won the silver medal in the women's duet, with Andrea Fuentes, and a bronze medal in the team event. She competed in the women's duet at the 2016 Summer Olympics, with Gemma Mengual, finishing in fourth place.

During her preparation for the 2020 Summer Olympics, Carbonell gave birth in August 2020. Despite medical advice not to train for six months, Carbonell returned in four weeks and competed at the Olympics, where she came seventh in the team event. A documentary, Starting Over, was made of her grappling with the roles of mother and athlete. In December 2022 she was honored as one of the BBC 100 Women.
