= Olena Grechykhina =

Ukrainian synchronized swimmer

Personal information
- National team: Ukraine
- Born: 11 July 1991 (age 34) Donetsk, Ukrainian SSR, Soviet Union
- Height: 1.78 m (5 ft 10 in)
- Weight: 61 kg (134 lb)

Sport
- Sport: Swimming
- Strokes: Synchronized swimming
Medal record
World Championships
Bronze medal – third place	2013 Barcelona	Team technical routine
Bronze medal – third place	2013 Barcelona	Team Free routine
Bronze medal – third place	2013 Barcelona	Free routine combination
World Cup
Gold medal – first place	2014 Quebec City	Highlights routine
Silver medal – second place	2014 Quebec City	Team technical routine
Bronze medal – third place	2014 Quebec City	Team free routine
Bronze medal – third place	2014 Quebec City	Free routine combination
European Championships
Gold medal – first place	2014 Berlin	Combination routine
Gold medal – first place	2016 London	Team free routine
Silver medal – second place	2012 Eindhoven	Combination routine
Silver medal – second place	2014 Berlin	Team routine
Silver medal – second place	2016 London	Team technical routine
Silver medal – second place	2016 London	Combination routine
Bronze medal – third place	2010 Budapest	Team routine
Bronze medal – third place	2010 Budapest	Combination routine

Olena Grechykhina (Ukrainian: Олена Гречихiна, born 11 July 1991) is a Ukrainian competitor in synchronized swimming.

She won 3 bronze medals at the 2013 World Aquatics Championships. She also won a gold and a silver at the 2014 European Aquatics Championships, a silver at the 2012 European Aquatics Championships, and a bronze at the 2010 European Aquatics Championships.
