= Aleksandra Zueva =

Russian synchronized swimmer

Personal information
- Full name: Aleksandra Igorevna Zueva
- National team: Russia
- Born: 18 December 1994 (age 31)
- Height: 1.83 m (6 ft 0 in)
- Weight: 59 kg (130 lb)

Sport
- Sport: Swimming
- Strokes: Synchronized swimming
Medal record
Women's synchronized swimming
Representing Russia
World Championships
Gold medal – first place	2013 Barcelona	Team Technical Routine
Gold medal – first place	2013 Barcelona	Free Routine Combination
European Championships
Gold medal – first place	2010 Budapest	Team Routine
Gold medal – first place	2010 Budapest	Combination Routine
Summer Universiade
Gold medal – first place	2013 Kazan	Combined Routine

Aleksandra Igorevna Zueva (Russian: Александра Игоревна Зуева; born 5 July 1994) is a Russian competitor in synchronized swimming.

She won 2 gold medals at the 2013 World Aquatics Championships, a gold medal at the 2013 Summer Universiade, and 2 gold medals at the 2010 European Aquatics Championships.
