= Dmytro Mezhenskyi =

Ukrainian diver

Personal information
- Full name: Dmytro Vyacheslavovych Mezhenskyi
- Born: 18 October 1990 (age 35) Luhansk, Ukrainian SSR, Soviet Union

Sport
- Country: Ukraine
- Event(s): 1m, 3m, 3m synchro, 10 m
- Partner(s): Oleksandr Gorshkovozov; Anton Zakharov
Medal record
Men's diving
Representing Ukraine
European Diving Championships
Bronze medal – third place	2013 Rostock	10 m synchro
Summer Universiade
Silver medal – second place	2011 Shenzhen	Team
World Junior Championships
Silver medal – second place	2008 Aachen	3 m synchro
European Junior Diving Championships
Gold medal – first place	2004 Aachen	3 m springboard
Gold medal – first place	2004 Aachen	10 m platform
Gold medal – first place	2008 Minsk	3 m springboard
Gold medal – first place	2008 Minsk	3 m synchro
Silver medal – second place	2005 Elektrostal	3 m springboard
Silver medal – second place	2006 Palma de Mallorca	3 m synchro
Silver medal – second place	2007 Trieste	3 m springboard
Bronze medal – third place	2004 Aachen	1 m springboard
Bronze medal – third place	2005 Elektrostal	1 m springboard

Dmytro Vyacheslavovych Mezhenskyi (Ukrainian: Дмитро В'ячеславович Меженський; born 18 October 1990 in Luhansk) is a Ukrainian diver. Competing with Oleksandr Gorshkovozov, he won a bronze medal in the 10 m spring synchro at the 2013 European Diving Championships in Rostock.

== Career ==
His first achievement in international competitions was a bronze medal in the 1 m springboard and two gold medals in the 3 m springboard and 10 m platform at the 2004 European Junior Diving Championships in Aachen. He became a multiple European Junior Championships medalist.

In the following years, he competed at the 2008 World Junior Diving Championships in Aachen, winning a silver medal in the 3 spring synchro.

Dmytro with Anton Zakharov competed at the 2010 European Aquatics Championships in 10 m platform synchro without receiving a medal (4th place).

Dmytro with Oleksandr Gorshkovozov won a bronze medal in the 3 m spring synchro at the 2011 FINA Diving Grand Prix. He also won a silver medal in team event at the 2011 Summer Universiade.

In 2013, Dmytro and Oleksandr won a bronze medal in 10 m spring synchro at the 2013 European Diving Championships.
