= Ganna Klymenko =

Ukrainian synchronized swimmer

Personal information
- National team: Ukraine
- Born: 27 February 1992 (age 34) Donetsk, Ukraine

Sport
- Sport: Swimming
- Strokes: Synchronized swimming
Medal record
Women's synchronized swimming
Representing Ukraine
World Championships
Bronze medal – third place	2013 Barcelona	Team Technical Routine
Bronze medal – third place	2013 Barcelona	Team Free Routine
Bronze medal – third place	2013 Barcelona	Free Routine Combination
European Championships
Silver medal – second place	2012 Eindhoven	Team Routine
Silver medal – second place	2012 Eindhoven	Combination Routine

Ganna Klymenko (Ukrainian: Анна Клименко, born 27 February 1992 in Donetsk) is a Ukrainian competitor in synchronized swimming.

She won 3 bronze medals at the 2013 World Aquatics Championships and 2 silver medals at the 2012 European Aquatics Championships.
