= Alexandra Patskevich =

Russian synchronized swimmer

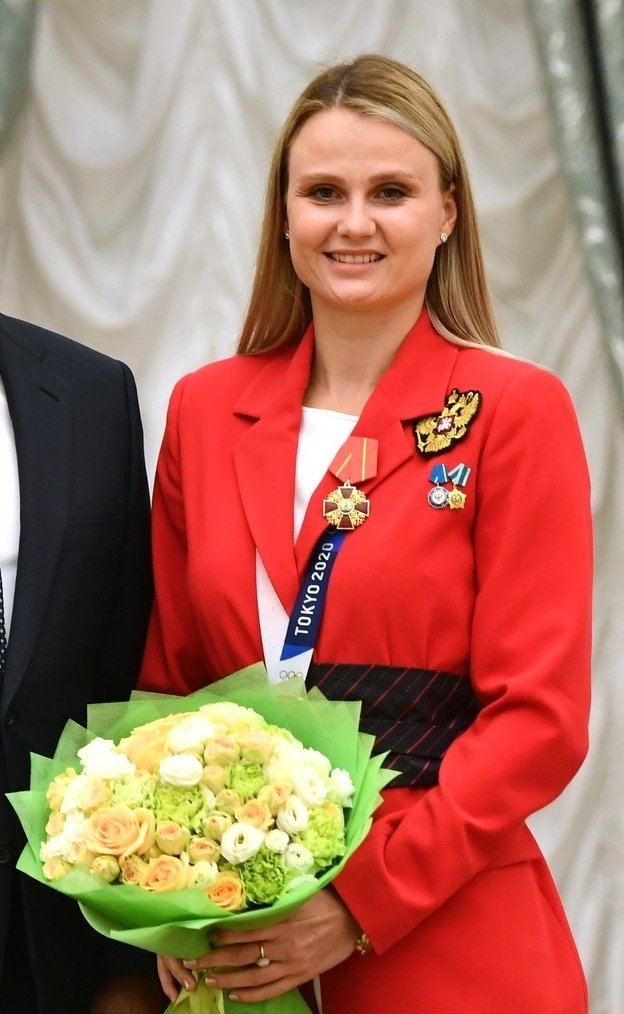
- Patskevich in 2021

Personal information
- Full name: Aleksandra Vyacheslavovna Patskevich
- Nationality: Russian
- Born: 4 November 1988 (age 37) Moscow, Russian SFSR, Soviet Union
- Height: 1.69 m (5 ft 7 in)

Sport
- Sport: Swimming
- Strokes: Synchronized swimming
- Club: SC Yunost Moskvy
- Coach: Tatiana Pokrovskaya; Tatiana Danchenko; Valentina Teplyakova
Medal record
Representing (Russia) ROC
Olympic Games
Gold medal – first place	2020 Tokyo	Team
Representing Russia
Olympic Games
Gold medal – first place	2012 London	Team
Gold medal – first place	2016 Rio de Janeiro	Team
World Championships
Gold medal – first place	2009 Rome	Team technical routine
Gold medal – first place	2009 Rome	Team free routine
Gold medal – first place	2011 Shanghai	Team technical routine
Gold medal – first place	2011 Shanghai	Team free routine
Gold medal – first place	2011 Shanghai	Free routine combination
Gold medal – first place	2013 Barcelona	Team technical routine
Gold medal – first place	2013 Barcelona	Team free routine
Gold medal – first place	2013 Barcelona	Free routine combination
Gold medal – first place	2015 Kazan	Team technical routine
Gold medal – first place	2015 Kazan	Team free routine
Gold medal – first place	2015 Kazan	Free routine combination
Gold medal – first place	2017 Budapest	Duet technical routine
Gold medal – first place	2017 Budapest	Duet free routine
European Championships
Gold medal – first place	2010 Budapest	Team
Gold medal – first place	2010 Budapest	Free routine combination
Gold medal – first place	2016 London	Team technical routine
Gold medal – first place	2016 London	Free routine combination
Summer Universiade
Gold medal – first place	2013 Kazan	Team
Gold medal – first place	2013 Kazan	Free routine combination

Alexandra Vyacheslavovna Patskevich (Russian: Александра Вячеславовна Пацкевич, IPA: [ɐlʲɪˈksandrə pɐtsˈkʲevʲɪtɕ]; born 4 November 1988) is a Russian competitor in synchronized swimming. She is a three-time Olympic, 13-time World and four-time European champion.

== Personal life ==
Patskevich works in the Presidential Administration of Russia. She is married to the Olympic swimmer Grigory Falko, they have a son Semyon (born 2019).
