= Manila Flamini =

Italian synchronized swimmer

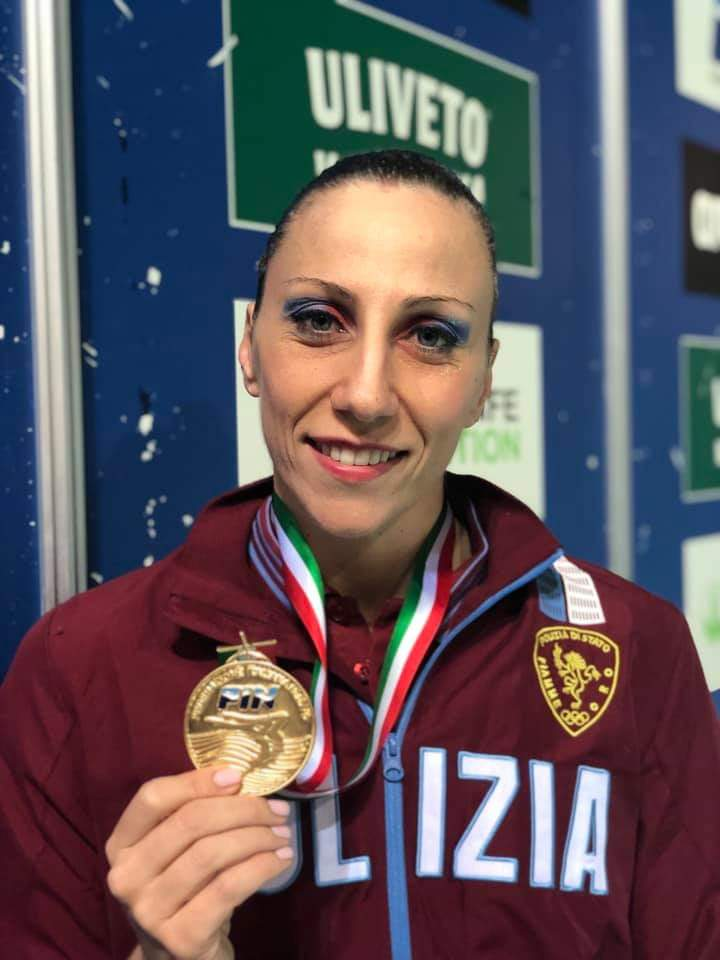
- Flamini in 2019

Personal information
- Nationality: Italian
- Born: 18 September 1987 (age 38) Velletri, Italy
- Height: 1.67 m (5 ft 6 in)
- Weight: 57 kg (126 lb)

Sport
- Sport: Swimming
- Strokes: Synchronised swimming
- Club: GS Flames Gold Rome - Aurelia Swimming Unicusano
Medal record
World Championships
Gold medal – first place	2017 Budapest	Mixed duet technical
Silver medal – second place	2019 Gwangju	Mixed duet technical
Silver medal – second place	2019 Gwangju	Mixed duet free
Bronze medal – third place	2015 Kazan	Mixed duet technical
European Championships
Silver medal – second place	2008 Eindhoven	Combination routine
Silver medal – second place	2008 Eindhoven	Team
Silver medal – second place	2016 London	Team free routine
Silver medal – second place	2016 London	Mixed technical routine
Silver medal – second place	2016 London	Team free routine
Silver medal – second place	2018 Glasgow	Mixed free routine
Silver medal – second place	2018 Glasgow	Mixed technical routine
Bronze medal – third place	2014 Berlin	Combination routine
Bronze medal – third place	2012 Eindhoven	Team
Bronze medal – third place	2012 Eindhoven	Combination routine
Bronze medal – third place	2006 Budapest	Team
Bronze medal – third place	2006 Budapest	Combination routine
Bronze medal – third place	2016 London	Team technical routine
Bronze medal – third place	2016 London	Combination routine

Manila Flamini (born 18 September 1987) is an Italian synchronised swimmer.

Flamini an athlete of the Gruppo Sportivo Fiamme Oro.

== Career ==
In November 2014, FINA officially approved of adding mixed-gender events in Synchronized swimming and diving under its banner after a vote at the Extraordinary Congress in Doha Qatar.

At the 2015 World Aquatics Championships in Kazan, Flamini represented Italy at the inaugural Mixed Duet in synchronized swimming, she won a bronze medal with duet partner Giorgio Minisini in the mixed duet technical.
