= Alba Cabello =

Spanish synchronized swimmer

Personal information
- Full name: Alba María Cabello Rodilla
- Born: 30 April 1986 (age 40) Madrid, Spain

Sport
- Country: Spain
- Sport: Synchronized swimming
Medal record
Olympic Games
Silver medal – second place	2008 Beijing	Team
Bronze medal – third place	2012 London	Team
World Championships
Gold medal – first place	2009 Rome	Free combination
Silver medal – second place	2013 Barcelona	Team technical
Silver medal – second place	2013 Barcelona	Team free
Silver medal – second place	2013 Barcelona	Routine combination
Bronze medal – third place	2011 Shanghai	Team technical
Bronze medal – third place	2011 Shanghai	Team free
European Championships
Gold medal – first place	2012 Debrecen	Team
Gold medal – first place	2012 Debrecen	Combination
Silver medal – second place	2010 Budapest	Team
Silver medal – second place	2010 Budapest	Combination
Silver medal – second place	2014 Berlin	Combination routine
Bronze medal – third place	2014 Berlin	Team routine
Bronze medal – third place	2016 London	Team free routine

Alba María Cabello Rodilla (Note: In this Spanish name, the first or paternal surname is Cabello and the second or maternal family name is Rodilla.) (born 30 April 1986) is a Spanish synchronized swimmer. She competed at the 2008 and 2012 Summer Olympics, winning a silver and a bronze respectively in the women's team event.
