= Laia Pons =

Spanish synchronized swimmer

Personal information
- Born: 24 April 1993 (age 33) Granollers, Spain

Sport
- Sport: Synchronised swimming
Medal record
Representing Spain
Olympic Games
Bronze medal – third place	2012 London	Team
World Championships
Silver medal – second place	2013 Barcelona	Team free
Silver medal – second place	2013 Barcelona	Routine combination
European Championships
Gold medal – first place	2012 Eindhoven	Routine combination

Laia Pons Areñas (born 24 April 1993) is a Spanish competitor in synchronized swimming. She won a bronze medal in team competition at the 2012 Summer Olympics.
