= Paula Klamburg =

Spanish synchronized swimmer

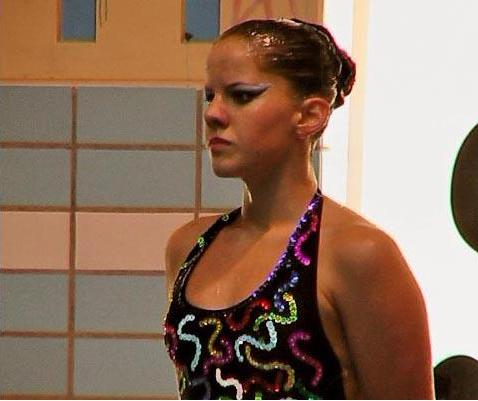

Personal information
- Full name: Paula Klamburg Roque
- Born: 20 September 1989 (age 36) Barcelona, Spain
- Height: 171 cm (5 ft 7 in)

Sport
- Country: Spain
- Sport: Synchronized swimming
Medal record
Olympic Games
| Bronze medal – third place | 2012 London | Team |
World Championships
| Gold medal – first place | 2009 Rome | Routine combination |
| Silver medal – second place | 2009 Rome | Team technical |
| Silver medal – second place | 2009 Rome | Team free |
| Silver medal – second place | 2013 Barcelona | Team technical |
| Silver medal – second place | 2013 Barcelona | Team free |
| Silver medal – second place | 2013 Barcelona | Routine combination |
| Bronze medal – third place | 2011 Shanghai | Team technical |
| Bronze medal – third place | 2011 Shanghai | Team free |
European Championships
| Gold medal – first place | 2012 Eindhoven | Team free |
| Gold medal – first place | 2012 Eindhoven | Routine combination |
| Silver medal – second place | 2010 Budapest | Team free |
| Silver medal – second place | 2010 Budapest | Routine combination |
| Silver medal – second place | 2014 Berlin | Combination routine |
| Bronze medal – third place | 2014 Berlin | Team routine |

Paula Klamburg Roque (Note: In this Spanish name, the first or paternal surname is Klamburg and the second or maternal family name is Roque.) (born 20 September 1989 in Barcelona) is a retired Spanish competitor in synchronized swimming. She won a bronze medal in the team competition at the 2012 Summer Olympics. She announced her retirement after Spanish team did not qualify for the 2016 Summer Olympics. She began training in synchronised swimming in 1997 and made her international debut at the 2009 World Championships.
