= Sara Levy (synchronized swimmer) =

Spanish synchronized swimmer

Personal information
- Full name: Sara Levy Sellarés
- Born: 23 May 1994 (age 32) Spain
- Height: 1.72 m (5 ft 8 in)

Sport
- Country: Spain
- Sport: Synchronized swimming
Medal record
World Championships
Silver medal – second place	2013 Barcelona	Team Free Routine
Silver medal – second place	2013 Barcelona	Free Routine Combination
European Championships
Silver medal – second place	2014 Berlin	Combination Routine
Bronze medal – third place	2014 Berlin	Team Routine

Sara Levy Sellarés (Note: In this Spanish name, the first or paternal surname is Levy and the second or maternal family name is Sellarés.) (born 23 May 1994) is a Spanish competitor in synchronized swimming.

She won two silver medals at the 2013 World Aquatics Championships. She also won a silver and a bronze at the 2014 European Aquatics Championships.
