= Oleksandra Sabada =

Ukrainian synchronized swimmer

Personal information
- Born: 6 January 1991 (age 35) Kharkiv, Ukrainian SSR, Soviet Union
- Height: 1.68 m (5 ft 6 in)
- Weight: 54 kg (119 lb)

Sport
- Country: Ukraine
- Sport: Synchronized swimming
Medal record
Women's artistic swimming
Representing Ukraine
| Event | 1st | 2nd | 3rd |
|---|---|---|---|
| World Championships | 0 | 0 | 3 |
| World Cup | 1 | 1 | 2 |
| European Championships | 2 | 5 | 2 |
| European Junior Championships | 0 | 2 | 2 |
| Total | 3 | 8 | 9 |
World Championships
| Bronze medal – third place | 2013 Barcelona | Team technical routine |
| Bronze medal – third place | 2013 Barcelona | Team free routine |
| Bronze medal – third place | 2013 Barcelona | Free routine combination |
World Cup
| Gold medal – first place | 2014 Quebec City | Highlights routine |
| Silver medal – second place | 2014 Quebec City | Team technical routine |
| Bronze medal – third place | 2014 Quebec City | Team free routine |
| Bronze medal – third place | 2014 Quebec City | Free routine combination |
European Championships
| Gold medal – first place | 2014 Berlin | Combination routine |
| Gold medal – first place | 2016 London | Team free routine |
| Silver medal – second place | 2012 Eindhoven | Team routine |
| Silver medal – second place | 2012 Eindhoven | Combination routine |
| Silver medal – second place | 2014 Berlin | Team routine |
| Silver medal – second place | 2016 London | Team technical routine |
| Silver medal – second place | 2016 London | Combination routine |
| Bronze medal – third place | 2010 Budapest | Team routine |
| Bronze medal – third place | 2010 Budapest | Combination routine |
European Junior Championships
| Silver medal – second place | 2009 Gloucester | Team routine |
| Silver medal – second place | 2009 Gloucester | Free routine combination |
| Bronze medal – third place | 2006 Bonn | Free routine combination |
| Bronze medal – third place | 2007 Callela | Free routine combination |

Oleksandra Sabada (Ukrainian: Александра Сабада, born 6 January 1991) is a Ukrainian competitor in synchronized swimming.

She won 3 bronze medals at the 2013 World Aquatics Championships. She also won a gold and a silver at the 2014 European Aquatics Championships, 2 silvers at the 2012 European Aquatics Championships, and a bronze at the 2010 European Aquatics Championships.
