= Kseniya Sydorenko =

Ukrainian synchronized swimmer

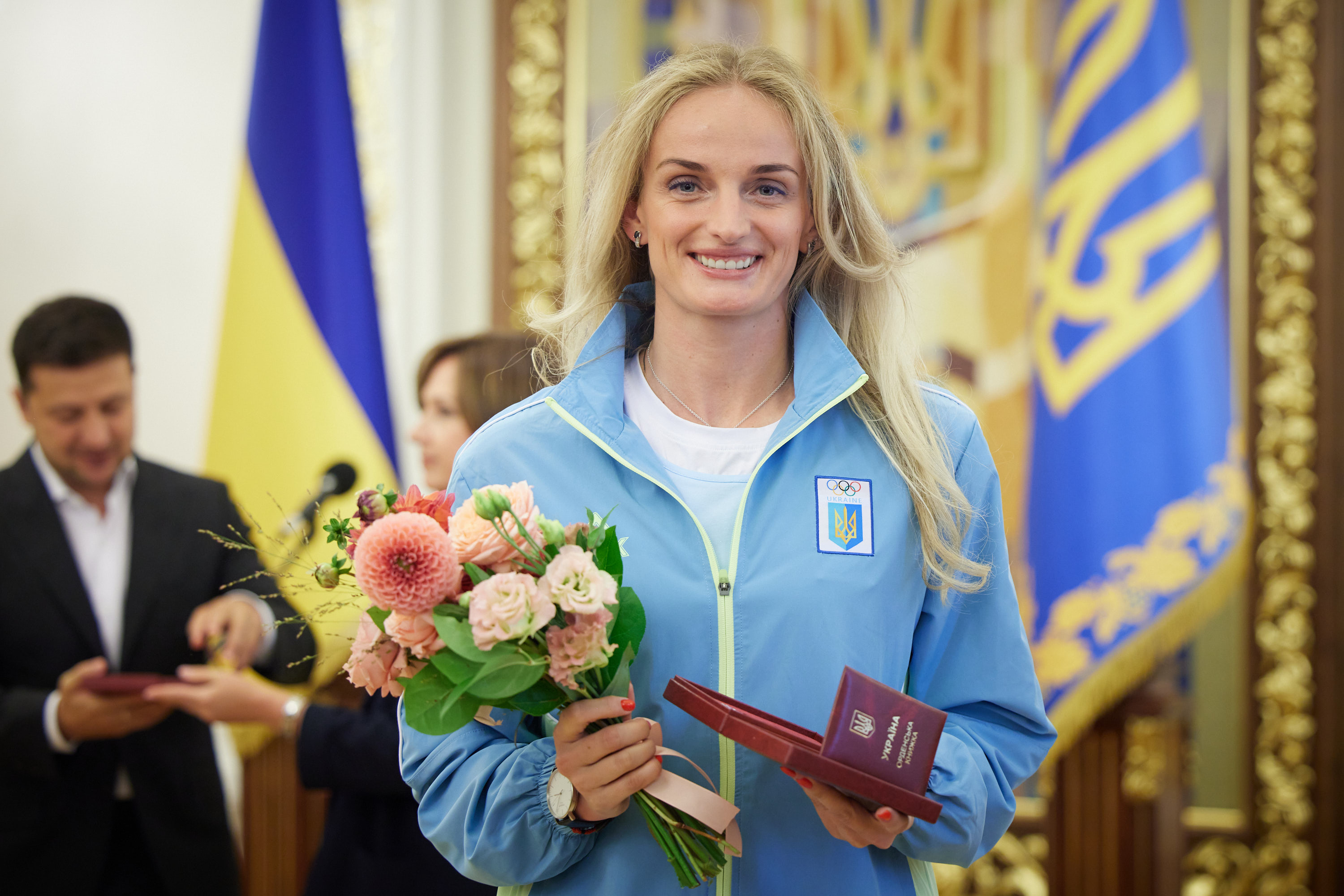
- Sydorenko in 2021

Personal information
- Nationality: Ukrainian
- Born: 2 July 1986 (age 39) Kharkiv, Ukrainian SSR, Soviet Union
- Height: 1.78 m (5 ft 10 in)
- Weight: 60 kg (132 lb)

Sport
- Sport: Swimming
- Strokes: Synchronized swimming
- Club: Panellinios GS
Medal record
Women's artistic swimming
Representing Ukraine
Event	1st	2nd	3rd
Olympic Games	0	0	1
World Championships	0	1	1
European Championships	5	6	7
European Junior Championships	0	1	2
Total	5	8	11
Olympic Games
Bronze medal – third place	2020 Tokyo	Team
World Championships
Silver medal – second place	2017 Budapest	Free routine combination
Bronze medal – third place	2017 Budapest	Team free routine
European Championships
Gold medal – first place	2014 Berlin	Combination routine
Gold medal – first place	2016 London	Team free routine
Gold medal – first place	2020 Budapest	Team free routine
Gold medal – first place	2020 Budapest	Combination routine
Gold medal – first place	2020 Budapest	Highlights routine
Silver medal – second place	2012 Eindhoven	Team routine
Silver medal – second place	2012 Eindhoven	Combination routine
Silver medal – second place	2014 Berlin	Team routine
Silver medal – second place	2016 London	Team technical routine
Silver medal – second place	2016 London	Combination routine
Silver medal – second place	2020 Budapest	Team technical routine
Bronze medal – third place	2008 Eindhoven	Duet routine
Bronze medal – third place	2008 Eindhoven	Team routine
Bronze medal – third place	2008 Eindhoven	Combination routine
Bronze medal – third place	2010 Budapest	Duet routine
Bronze medal – third place	2010 Budapest	Team routine
Bronze medal – third place	2010 Budapest	Combination routine
Bronze medal – third place	2012 Eindhoven	Duet routine
European Junior Championships
Silver medal – second place	2003 Andorra la Vella	Free routine combination
Bronze medal – third place	2002 Moscow	Team routine
Bronze medal – third place	2003 Andorra la Vella	Team routine

Kseniya Volodymyrivna Sydorenko (Ukrainian: Ксенія Володимирівна Сидоренко; born 2 July 1986) is a Ukrainian synchronized swimmer.

== Career ==
She competed in the women's duet at the 2008 and 2012 Summer Olympics as well as in the women's team at the 2016 Summer Olympics. She is twice 2017 World Aquatics Championships medalist, twice European champion and multiple European Championships medalist.
