= Svetlana Kolesnichenko =

Russian synchronized swimmer

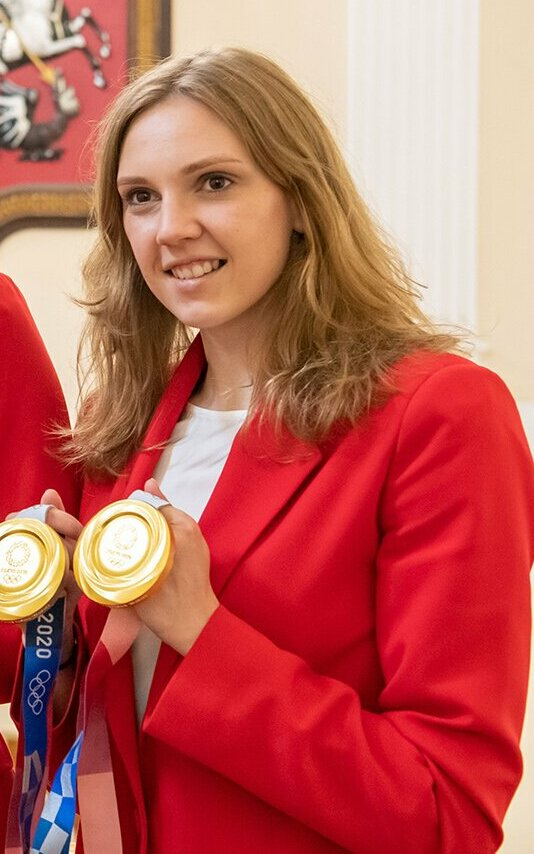
- Kolesnichenko in 2021

Personal information
- Full name: Svetlana Konstantinovna Kolesnichenko
- National team: Russia
- Born: 20 September 1993 (age 32) Gatchina, Leningrad Oblast, Russia
- Height: 1.71 m (5 ft 7 in)
- Weight: 54 kg (119 lb)

Sport
- Sport: Swimming
- Strokes: Synchronised swimming
- Club: Dynamo Moscow
Medal record
Representing (Russia) ROC
Olympic Games
Gold medal – first place	2020 Tokyo	Duet
Gold medal – first place	2020 Tokyo	Team
Representing Russia
Olympic Games
Gold medal – first place	2016 Rio de Janeiro	Team
World Championships
Gold medal – first place	2011 Shanghai	Team technical routine
Gold medal – first place	2011 Shanghai	Team free routine
Gold medal – first place	2011 Shanghai	Free routine combination
Gold medal – first place	2013 Barcelona	Duet technical routine
Gold medal – first place	2013 Barcelona	Duet free routine
Gold medal – first place	2013 Barcelona	Team free routine
Gold medal – first place	2015 Kazan	Team technical routine
Gold medal – first place	2015 Kazan	Team free routine
Gold medal – first place	2015 Kazan	Free routine combination
Gold medal – first place	2017 Budapest	Solo technical routine
Gold medal – first place	2017 Budapest	Solo free routine
Gold medal – first place	2017 Budapest	Duet technical routine
Gold medal – first place	2017 Budapest	Duet free routine
Gold medal – first place	2019 Gwangju	Solo technical routine
Gold medal – first place	2019 Gwangju	Duet technical routine
Gold medal – first place	2019 Gwangju	Duet free routine
European Championships
Gold medal – first place	2014 Berlin	Duet
Gold medal – first place	2014 Berlin	Team
Gold medal – first place	2016 London	Team technical routine
Gold medal – first place	2016 London	Free routine combination
Gold medal – first place	2018 Glasgow	Solo technical routine
Gold medal – first place	2018 Glasgow	Solo free routine
Gold medal – first place	2018 Glasgow	Duet technical routine
Gold medal – first place	2018 Glasgow	Duet free routine
Gold medal – first place	2020 Budapest	Duet technical routine
Gold medal – first place	2020 Budapest	Duet free routine
Gold medal – first place	2020 Budapest	Team technical routine
Summer Universiade
Gold medal – first place	2013 Kazan	Duet
Gold medal – first place	2013 Kazan	Team

Svetlana Konstantinovna Kolesnichenko (Russian: Светлана Константиновна Колесниченко, IPA: [svʲɪˈtɫanə kəlʲɪsʲnʲɪˈtɕenkə]; born 20 September 1993) is a Russian competitor in synchronised swimming. She is a three-time Olympic champion.

== Career ==
She has won 16 gold medals at the World Aquatics Championships. She also won 11 gold medals at the LEN European Aquatics Championships, as well as 2 golds at the 2013 Summer Universiade.

In 2018, Kolesnichenko and Varvara Subbotina won the gold medal in both the duet technical routine and duet free routine at the 2018 European Aquatics Championships.
