= Kateryna Sadurska =

Ukrainian synchronized swimmer (born 1992)

Personal information
- National team: Ukraine
- Born: 19 July 1992 (age 33) Mykolaiv, Ukraine
- Height: 1.78 m (5 ft 10 in)
- Weight: 58 kg (128 lb)

Sport
- Sport: Swimming
- Strokes: Synchronized swimming Freediving
Medal record
Women's artistic swimming
Representing Ukraine
| Event | 1st | 2nd | 3rd |
|---|---|---|---|
| World Championships | 0 | 0 | 3 |
| World Cup | 1 | 1 | 2 |
| European Championships | 2 | 5 | 2 |
| World Junior Championships | 0 | 2 | 0 |
| European Junior Championships | 0 | 5 | 0 |
| Total | 3 | 13 | 7 |
World Championships
| Bronze medal – third place | 2013 Barcelona | Team technical routine |
| Bronze medal – third place | 2013 Barcelona | Team free routine |
| Bronze medal – third place | 2013 Barcelona | Free routine combination |
World Cup
| Gold medal – first place | 2014 Quebec City | Highlights routine |
| Silver medal – second place | 2014 Quebec City | Team technical routine |
| Bronze medal – third place | 2014 Quebec City | Team free routine |
| Bronze medal – third place | 2014 Quebec City | Free routine combination |
European Championships
| Gold medal – first place | 2014 Berlin | Combination routine |
| Gold medal – first place | 2016 London | Team free routine |
| Silver medal – second place | 2012 Eindhoven | Team routine |
| Silver medal – second place | 2012 Eindhoven | Combination routine |
| Silver medal – second place | 2014 Berlin | Team routine |
| Silver medal – second place | 2016 London | Team technical routine |
| Silver medal – second place | 2016 London | Combination routine |
| Bronze medal – third place | 2010 Budapest | Team routine |
| Bronze medal – third place | 2010 Budapest | Combination routine |
World Junior Championships
| Silver medal – second place | 2010 Indianapolis | Duet routine |
| Silver medal – second place | 2010 Indianapolis | Free routine combination |
European Junior Championships
| Silver medal – second place | 2009 Gloucester | Team routine |
| Silver medal – second place | 2009 Gloucester | Free routine combination |
| Silver medal – second place | 2010 Tampere | Team routine |
| Silver medal – second place | 2010 Tampere | Free routine combination |
| Silver medal – second place | 2010 Tampere | Duet routine |
Women's freediving
Representing Ukraine
World Outdoor Championships
| Gold medal – first place | 2022 Kaş | Free immersion |
| Gold medal – first place | 2022 Kaş | Constant weight without fins |
World Depth Championships
| Gold medal – first place | 2023 Roatán Island | Free immersion |
| Gold medal – first place | 2023 Roatán Island | Constant weight without fins |
| Gold medal – first place | 2024 Kalamata | Free immersion |
| Gold medal – first place | 2024 Kalamata | Constant weight without fins |
| Bronze medal – third place | 2024 Kalamata | Constant weight bi-fins |
World Individual Pool Championships
| Silver medal – second place | 2022 Burgas | Dynamic weight bi-fins |
| Bronze medal – third place | 2022 Burgas | Dynamic weight without fins |
World Pool Championships
| Bronze medal – third place | 2024 Kaunas | Dynamic weight bi-fins |
| Bronze medal – third place | 2024 Kaunas | Dynamic weight without fins |

Kateryna Sadurska (Ukrainian: Катерина Садурська, born 19 July 1992) is a Ukrainian athlete who has achieved multiple world championships and holds world records in freediving, European champion, world championship medalist, and participant in the 2016 Rio Olympic Games in synchronized (artistic) swimming. She has set seven world records in freediving and has been crowned world champion six times. She is the first woman in the world to reach a depth of 84 meters in the Constant weight without fins (CNF) discipline, setting an absolute world record.

== World Records ==
Kateryna has set seven world records in freediving:

- July 22, 2023 – Vertical Blue 2023 Tournament: AIDA world record in the Constant Weight Without Fins (CNF) discipline, diving to 74 meters.
- July 27, 2023 – Vertical Blue 2023 Tournament: absolute world record in CNF discipline — 76 meters.
- July 29, 2023 – Vertical Blue 2023 Tournament: world record in CNF discipline — 77 meters.
- August 24, 2023 – CMAS World Championship, Honduras: absolute world record in CNF discipline — 78 meters.
- October 10, 2024 – CMAS World Championship, Kalamata, Greece: new absolute world record in CNF discipline — 80 meters.
- November 26, 2024 – AIDA International Competition, Dominica: Kateryna extended the record by 2 meters in the CNF discipline, setting a new absolute world record — 82 meters.
- December 2, 2024 – AIDA International Competition, Dominica: Kateryna reached 84 meters in the CNF discipline, rewriting history as the first woman to achieve such depth without additional equipment.

== Early life ==
Kateryna Sadurska was born on 19 July 1992 in Mykolaiv. Since childhood, she loved diving in the sea and in the river. Actually, at first Kateryna wanted to do diving, but she wasn't taken to the sport school by coaches because she was very tall. So, in 2000, at the age of 8, she decided to do artistic swimming at the sports school "Vodoliy".

== Career in artistic swimming ==
=== 2009 - 2010: Junior career ===
In April 2009, Kateryna Sadurska debuted competing at the international competitions: she won two silver medals in the team routine and free routine combination events at the European Junior Championships in Gloucester.

In July 2010, Sadurska won three silver medals in duet and team routine, free routine combination at the European Junior Championships in Tampere. One month later, Kateryna competed at the World Junior Championships, winning two silver medals in duet routine (with Lolita Ananasova) and in the free routine combination event. Later, Kateryna competed at the European Championships in Budapest, where she won two bronze medals in team and combination routines with her team. In December, she won two bronze medals in team and combination routines at the FINA Synchro World Trophy 2010 in Moscow.

=== 2011 - 2012: First European Champions Cup title and first World Championships ===
In 2011, she firstly competed at the World Championships in Shanghai without reaching any medals: her team finished 5th in free routine combination and 6th in team technical routine and team free routine. But she won a gold medal in combination routine and a bronze one in team routine at the European Champions Cup in Sheffield.

In May 2012, firstly in her career, Sadurska won two silver medals in team and combination routines at the European Championships in Eindhoven. In December, Sadurska won three bronze medals in the team thematic, combination and highlights routines at the FINA Synchro World Trophy in Mexico.

=== 2013: First World Championships bronze medals ===
In February, representing Kharkiv oblast-1, Sadurska won three gold medals in the team free, combination and technical routines at the Ukrainian National Championships in Kharkiv. In May, she won two gold medals in team free and highlights routine, a silver one in team technical routine at the European Champions Cup in Savona. In July, Sadurska became one of the first World Championships medalists from Ukraine in artistic swimming, winning three bronze medals at the World Championships in Barcelona. In November, Kateryna received two silver medals in team free routine and free routine combination and a bronze one in highlights routine at the FINA Synchro World Trophy in Mexico.

=== 2014: First European and World Cup title ===
In October, she competed at the European Championships, winning a gold medal in combination routine and a silver one in team routine. That month, Sadurska won gold, silver and two bronze medals at the World Cup in Quebec City.

== Career in freediving ==
Kateryna has fully dedicated herself to freediving, where she has set seven world records and become a six-time world champion.

World Championship Gold Medals:

- 2022 – CMAS World Championship, Kaş, Turkey: gold medal in Free Immersion (FIM) — 92 meters.
- 2022 – CMAS World Championship, Kaş, Turkey: gold medal in Constant Weight Without Fins (CNF) — 70 meters.
- 2023 – CMAS World Championship, Honduras: gold medal in Free Immersion (FIM) — 97 meters.
- 2023 – CMAS World Championship, Honduras: gold medal in Constant Weight Without Fins (CNF) — 78 meters.
- 2024 – CMAS World Championship, Kalamata, Greece: gold medal in Constant Weight Without Fins (CNF) — 80 meters.
- 2024 – CMAS World Championship, Kalamata, Greece: gold medal in Free Immersion (FIM) — 95 meters.

Other Medals:

- Gold – Vertical Blue Tournament, 2023 in CNF discipline.
- Gold – CMAS Freediving World Cup 2023, Kalamata, Greece, in CNF discipline.
- Gold – CMAS Freediving World Cup 2023, Kalamata, Greece, in FIM discipline.
- Gold – CMAS Freediving World Cup 2023, Kalamata, Greece, in CWTBF discipline.
- Silver – CMAS Freediving World Cup "Kaş Başka," Turkey, 2021 in CNF discipline (55 meters).
- Silver – 2022 AIDA World Championship (pool), Burgas (Bulgaria), in DYNB discipline.
- Bronze – 2022 AIDA World Championship (pool), Burgas (Bulgaria), in DNF discipline.
- Bronze – 2024 AIDA World Championship (pool), Kaunas (Lithuania), in DNF discipline.
- Bronze – 2024 AIDA World Championship (pool), Kaunas (Lithuania), in DYNB discipline.
- Third Place – Vertical Blue Tournament, 2023 in FIM discipline.
- Second Place – Vertical Blue Tournament, 2023 in the overall ranking.
- Bronze – CMAS World Championship, Kalamata, Greece, 2024, in CWTB discipline (95 meters).

Kateryna's National Records as of the End of 2024:

Depth Disciplines:

- CNF (Constant Weight Without Fins) — 84 meters, world record, Dominica, 2024.
- CWT (Constant Weight) — 107 meters, Dominica, 2024.
- FIM (Free Immersion) — 97 meters, Roatán, 2023.

Pool Disciplines:

- DYN (Dynamic with Fins) — 246 meters, Athens, 2024.
- DYNB (Dynamic with Bi-Fins) — 224.5 meters, Belgrade, 2024.
- DNF (Dynamic Without Fins) — 183.5 meters, Belgrade, 2024.
- STA (Static Apnea) — 7:01, Belgrade, 2021.

Public Activity

Kateryna actively promotes freediving and serves as an important symbol of Ukraine's strength and resilience on the international stage during the war. Her sporting achievements not only highlight the perseverance and determination of Ukrainians but also serve as a reminder to the world about the situation in Ukraine.

"These competitions are more than just sports. They are an opportunity for me to represent Ukraine and show the world that we are ready to fight and win, but we need support," Kateryna said after setting yet another world record.
