= Anisya Olkhova =

Russian synchronized swimmer (born 1991)

Personal information
- Full name: Anisya Vladimirovna Olkhova
- National team: Russia
- Born: 28 November 1991 (age 34) Moscow, Russia
- Height: 1.74 m (5 ft 9 in)

Sport
- Sport: Swimming
- Strokes: Synchronized swimming
Medal record
Women's synchronized swimming
Representing Russia
World Championships
Gold medal – first place	2013 Barcelona	Free Routine Combination
European Championships
Gold medal – first place	2014 Berlin	Team Routine
Summer Universiade
Gold medal – first place	2013 Kazan	Combined Routine

Anisya Vladimirovna Olkhova (Russian: Анисия Владимировна Ольхова: born 28 November 1991, in Moscow) is a Russian competitor in synchronized swimming.

She won a gold medal at the 2013 World Aquatics Championships, a gold medal at the 2014 European Aquatics Championships, and a gold medal at the 2013 Summer Universiade.
