= Anna Voloshyna =

Ukrainian synchronized swimmer

Personal information
- Born: 26 September 1991 (age 34) Kharkiv, Ukraine

Sport
- Sport: Synchronised swimming
Medal record
Representing Ukraine
Event	1st	2nd	3rd
World Championships	0	1	9
World Cup	1	2	3
European Championships	2	10	3
European Junior Championships	0	2	2
Total	3	15	17
World Championships
Silver medal – second place	2017 Budapest	Free routine combination
Bronze medal – third place	2013 Barcelona	Team technical
Bronze medal – third place	2013 Barcelona	Team free
Bronze medal – third place	2013 Barcelona	Routine combination
Bronze medal – third place	2015 Kazan	Duet free routine
Bronze medal – third place	2017 Budapest	Solo technical routine
Bronze medal – third place	2017 Budapest	Solo free routine
Bronze medal – third place	2017 Budapest	Duet technical routine
Bronze medal – third place	2017 Budapest	Duet free routine
Bronze medal – third place	2017 Budapest	Team free routine
World Cup
Gold medal – first place	2014 Quebec City	Highlights routine
Silver medal – second place	2014 Quebec City	Duet free routine
Silver medal – second place	2014 Quebec City	Team technical routine
Bronze medal – third place	2014 Quebec City	Duet technical routine
Bronze medal – third place	2014 Quebec City	Team free routine
Bronze medal – third place	2014 Quebec City	Free routine combination
European Championships
Gold medal – first place	2014 Berlin	Combination routine
Gold medal – first place	2016 London	Team free routine
Silver medal – second place	2012 Debrecen	Team routine
Silver medal – second place	2012 Debrecen	Combination routine
Silver medal – second place	2014 Berlin	Duet routine
Silver medal – second place	2014 Berlin	Team routine
Silver medal – second place	2016 London	Solo free routine
Silver medal – second place	2016 London	Solo technical routine
Silver medal – second place	2016 London	Duet free routine
Silver medal – second place	2016 London	Duet technical routine
Silver medal – second place	2016 London	Team technical routine
Silver medal – second place	2016 London	Combination routine
Bronze medal – third place	2014 Berlin	Solo routine
Bronze medal – third place	2010 Budapest	Team routine
Bronze medal – third place	2010 Budapest	Combination routine
European Junior Championships
Silver medal – second place	2009 Gloucester	Free routine combination
Silver medal – second place	2009 Gloucester	Team routine
Bronze medal – third place	2007 Callela	Free routine combination
Bronze medal – third place	2009 Gloucester	Duet routine

Anna Vyacheslavivna Voloshyna (Ukrainian: Анна В'ячеславівна Волошина; born 26 September 1991) is a Ukrainian synchro swimmer. She has won fifteen medals at the European Championships – including gold in the combination routine (2014) and team free routine (2016) – and a silver as well as nine World bronze medals.

== Career ==
At the 2013 World Aquatics Championships Voloshyna won three bronze medals in team and combination competitions which were also Ukraine's first World Championships medals in synchro swimming.

Voloshyna finished fourth at the solo free routine and solo technical routine at the 2015 World Aquatics Championships. Few days after she won bronze medal in duet free routine in duet with Lolita Ananasova.

The most successful competition for her up to date is 2017 World Aquatics Championships in Budapest, Hungary, where she won a first-ever silver medal for Ukraine in combination, a bronze in team free routine, two bronze medals in pair with Yelyzaveta Yakhno in duet competitions and two bronze medals in solo events. That all made her the best ever Ukrainian synchro swimmer.
