= Olha Kondrashova =

Ukrainian synchronized swimmer

Personal information
- National team: Ukraine

Sport
- Sport: Swimming
- Strokes: Synchronized swimming
Medal record
Women's synchronised swimming
Representing Ukraine
Event	1st	2nd	3rd
World Cup	1	1	2
European Championships	1	3	3
European Junior Championships	0	0	2
Total	2	4	7
World Cup
Gold medal – first place	2014 Quebec City	Highlights routine
Silver medal – second place	2014 Quebec City	Team technical routine
Bronze medal – third place	2014 Quebec City	Team free routine
Bronze medal – third place	2014 Quebec City	Free routine combination
European Championships
Gold medal – first place	2016 London	Team free routine
Silver medal – second place	2012 Eindhoven	Team routine
Silver medal – second place	2012 Eindhoven	Combination routine
Silver medal – second place	2014 Berlin	Team routine
Bronze medal – third place	2008 Eindhoven	Team routine
Bronze medal – third place	2008 Eindhoven	Combination routine
Bronze medal – third place	2010 Budapest	Combination routine
European Junior Championships
Bronze medal – third place	2006 Bonn	Free routine combination
Bronze medal – third place	2007 Callela	Free routine combination

Olha Kondrashova (Ukrainian: Ольга Кондрашова) is a Ukrainian competitor in synchronized swimming.

She is multiple European championships medalist.
