= Camilla Cattaneo =

Italian synchronized swimmer

Personal information
- Born: 12 February 1990 (age 36) Savona, Italy

Sport
- Sport: Swimming
- Strokes: Synchronised swimming
Medal record
Representing Italy
European Championships
Silver medal – second place	2016 London	Team free
Bronze medal – third place	2012 Eindhoven	Team free
Bronze medal – third place	2012 Eindhoven	Team, free routine
Bronze medal – third place	2014 Berlin	Team, free routine
Bronze medal – third place	2016 London	Team, technical
Bronze medal – third place	2016 London	Team, free routine

Camilla Cattaneo (born 12 February 1990) is an Italian former synchronised swimmer. She competed in the team event at the 2016 Summer Olympics. Cattaneo is an athlete of the Gruppo Sportivo Fiamme Oro.
