= Olha Zolotarova =

Ukrainian synchronized swimmer

Personal information
- National team: Ukraine
- Born: 27 December 1994 (age 31) Kharkiv, Ukraine
- Height: 1.78 m (5 ft 10 in)
- Weight: 62 kg (137 lb)

Sport
- Sport: Swimming
- Strokes: Synchronized swimming
Medal record
Women's artistic swimming
Representing Ukraine
Event	1st	2nd	3rd
World Championships	0	0	2
European Championships	2	2	0
World Junior Championships	0	1	1
European Junior Championships	0	0	2
Total	2	3	5
World Championships
Bronze medal – third place	2013 Barcelona	Team free routine
Bronze medal – third place	2013 Barcelona	Free routine combination
European Championships
Gold medal – first place	2014 Berlin	Combination routine
Gold medal – first place	2016 London	Team free routine
Silver medal – second place	2016 London	Team technical routine
Silver medal – second place	2016 London	Combination routine
World Junior Championships
Silver medal – second place	2012 Volos	Free routine combination
Bronze medal – third place	2012 Volos	Team routine
European Junior Championships
Bronze medal – third place	2011 Belgrade	Team routine
Bronze medal – third place	2011 Belgrade	Free routine combination

Olha Zolotarova (Ukrainian: Ольга Золотарьова, born 27 December 1994) is a Ukrainian competitor in synchronized swimming.

She won 2 bronze medals at the 2013 World Aquatics Championships and a gold medal at the 2014 European Aquatics Championships.
