= Francesca Deidda =

Italian synchronized swimmer

Personal information
- Nationality: Italian
- Born: 16 January 1992 (age 34) Cagliari, Italy
- Height: 1.64 m (5 ft 5 in)
- Weight: 49 kg (108 lb)

Sport
- Sport: Swimming
- Strokes: Synchronised swimming
- Club: Promogest Coop Cagliari
Medal record
World Championships
Silver medal – second place	2019 Gwangju	Highlight routine
European Championships
Silver medal – second place	2018 Glasgow	Free routine combination
Bronze medal – third place	2018 Glasgow	Team free routine
Bronze medal – third place	2018 Glasgow	Team technical routine

Francesca Deidda (born 16 January 1992) is an Italian synchronised swimmer. She competed in the team event at the 2016 Summer Olympics. and in Team at the 2020 Summer Olympics. Deidda is an athlete of the Gruppo Sportivo Fiamme Oro.
