= Elisa Bozzo =

Italian synchronized swimmer

Personal information
- Born: 8 May 1987 (age 39) Genoa, Italy

Sport
- Sport: Swimming
- Strokes: Synchronised swimming
- Club: G.S. Marina Militare

Elisa Bozzo (born 8 May 1987) is an Italian synchronised swimmer. She competed in the team event at the 2016 Summer Olympics. Bozzo is an athlete of the Gruppo Sportivo della Marina Militare.
