= Sara Sgarzi =

Italian synchronized swimmer

Personal information
- Born: 27 May 1986 (age 40) Bologna, Italy

Sport
- Sport: Swimming
- Strokes: Synchronised swimming
Medal record
Representing Italy
European Championships
Silver medal – second place	2008 Eindhoven	Team, free
Silver medal – second place	2008 Eindhoven	Team, free routine
Silver medal – second place	2016 London	Team, free
Bronze medal – third place	2006 Budapest	Team, free
Bronze medal – third place	2006 Budapest	Team, free routine
Bronze medal – third place	2012 Eindhoven	Team, free
Bronze medal – third place	2012 Eindhoven	Team, free routine
Bronze medal – third place	2014 Berlin	Team, free routine
Bronze medal – third place	2016 London	Team, technical
Bronze medal – third place	2016 London	Team, free routine

Sara Sgarzi (born 27 May 1986) is an Italian synchronised swimmer. She competed in the team event at the 2016 Summer Olympics. Sgarzi an athlete of the Gruppo Sportivo Fiamme Oro.
