= Kateryna Reznik =

Ukrainian synchronized swimmer

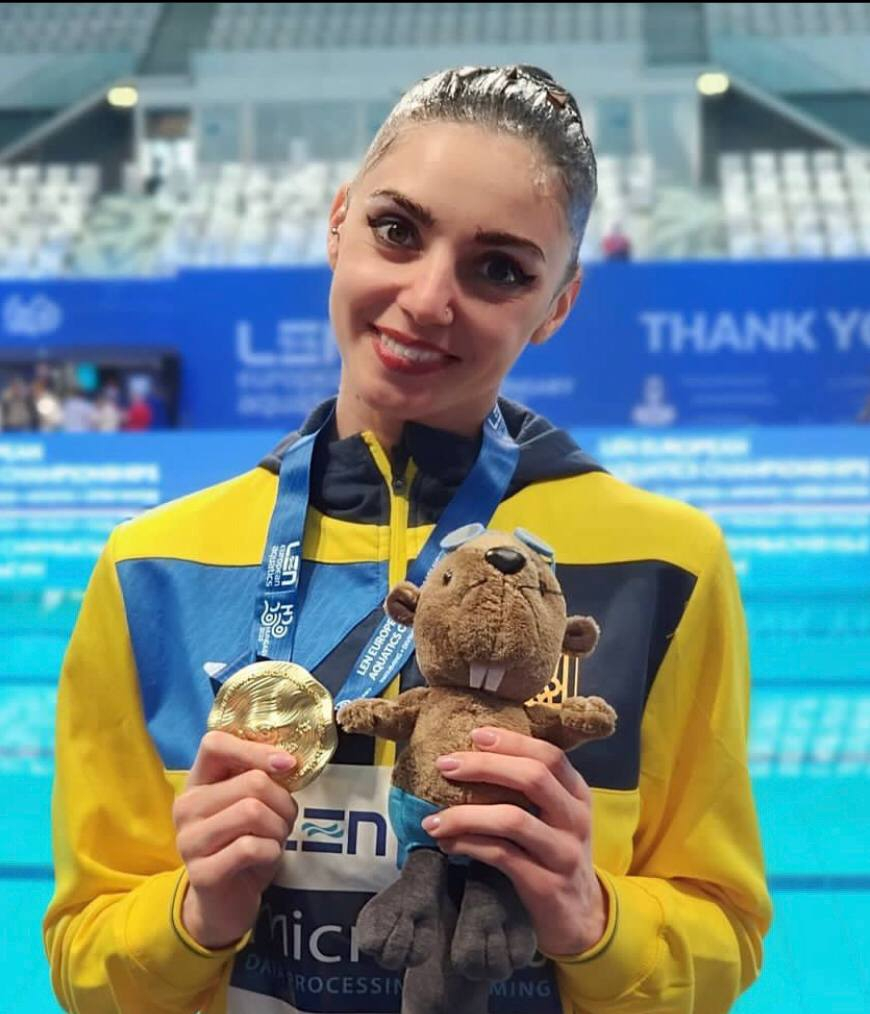
- Reznik at the 2021 European Championships

Personal information
- Full name: Kateryna Oleksandrivna Reznik
- National team: Ukraine
- Born: 20 November 1995 (age 30) Kharkiv, Ukraine
- Height: 1.75 m (5 ft 9 in)
- Weight: 52 kg (115 lb)

Sport
- Sport: Swimming
- Strokes: Synchronised swimming
Medal record
Women's synchronized swimming
Representing Ukraine
Event	1st	2nd	3rd
Olympic Games	0	0	1
World Championships	1	0	5
European Championships	6	3	0
World Junior Championships	0	2	2
European Junior Championships	0	5	2
Total	7	10	10
Olympic Games
Bronze medal – third place	2020 Tokyo	Team
World Championships
Gold medal – first place	2019 Gwangju	Highlight routine
Bronze medal – third place	2013 Barcelona	Team technical routine
Bronze medal – third place	2013 Barcelona	Free routine combination
Bronze medal – third place	2019 Gwangju	Team technical routine
Bronze medal – third place	2019 Gwangju	Team free routine
Bronze medal – third place	2019 Gwangju	Free routine combination
European Championships
Gold medal – first place	2014 Berlin	Free routine combination
Gold medal – first place	2016 London	Team free routine
Gold medal – first place	2018 Glasgow	Free routine combination
Gold medal – first place	2020 Budapest	Team free routine
Gold medal – first place	2020 Budapest	Combination routine
Gold medal – first place	2020 Budapest	Highlights routine
Silver medal – second place	2016 London	Free routine combination
Silver medal – second place	2018 Glasgow	Team free routine
Silver medal – second place	2020 Budapest	Team technical routine
World Junior Championships
Silver medal – second place	2010 Indianapolis	Free routine combination
Silver medal – second place	2012 Volos	Free routine combination
Bronze medal – third place	2012 Volos	Team routine
Bronze medal – third place	2012 Volos	Duet routine
European Junior Championships
Silver medal – second place	2010 Tampere	Team routine
Silver medal – second place	2010 Tampere	Free routine combination
Silver medal – second place	2013 Poznań	Free routine combination
Silver medal – second place	2013 Poznań	Team routine
Silver medal – second place	2013 Poznań	Duet routine
Bronze medal – third place	2011 Belgrade	Team routine
Bronze medal – third place	2011 Belgrade	Free routine combination

Kateryna Oleksandrivna Reznik (Ukrainian: Катерина Олександрівна Резнік, born 20 November 1995) is a Ukrainian competitor in synchronised swimming.

She won two bronze medals at the 2013 World Aquatics Championships and a gold medal at the 2014 European Aquatics Championships.

== Biography ==
Represents the team of the Kharkiv region. She graduated from Kharkiv National University of Internal Affairs.

In the summer of 2018, she was part of the synchronized swimming team of Ukraine, which became the best at the European Summer Sports Championship.

At the World Aquatics Championships in July 2019 in synchronized swimming, group, technical program, she and Vladyslava Aleksiyeva, Maryna Aleksiyeva, Yana Narizhna, Kateryna Reznik, Anastasia Savchuk, Marta Fedina, Alina Shinkarenko, Elizaveta Yakhno won bronze awards. In the highlight program, the team won gold awards.

Katerina is a Ukrainian psychologist and professional synchronized swimmer who became the Ukrainian multichampion in synchronized swimming from 2009 to 2021. She is a heroine for many fans of this sport.

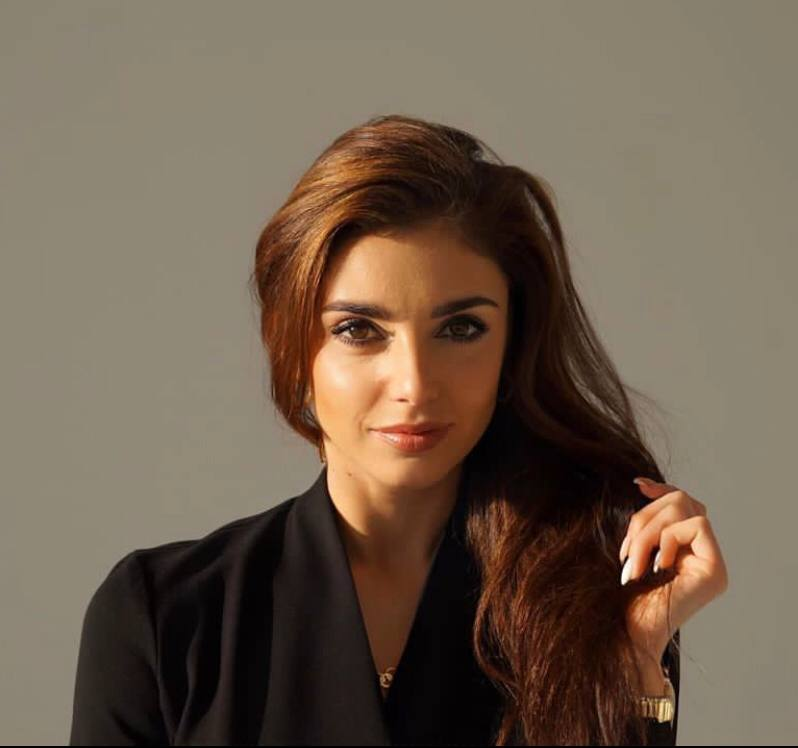
Reznik in 2023

She is currently pursuing her PhD in Psychology and specializes in working with professional athletes and others to help them achieve their goals and ensure their well-being through psychological methods.

Katerina is an experienced consultant for sports teams and individual athletes in swimming and synchronized swimming. She helps them achieve medals and improve athletic performance by applying her knowledge and experience in psychology to help athletes manage stress, increase motivation and achieve optimal mental fitness.

Katerina also does not forget about personal development and is engaged in self-development and personal projects. In her free time, she devotes herself to writing books and developing her skills.

Starting her swimming career at the age of 5, Katerina did not leave the pool for the next 20 years until she achieved an Olympic medal. She studied in parallel at two universities and received a higher education in the field of physical culture and sports, as well as psychology.

== Performances at the Olympics ==
Olympiad	Discipline	Place
Tokyo 2020	groups	3rd place, bronze medalist(s)

== State awards ==
- Order of Princess Olga III p. (August 16, 2021) — For achieving high sports results at the XXXII Summer Olympic Games in the city of Tokyo (Japan), showing dedication and the will to win, establishing Ukraine's international authority.
