= Synchronised swimming at the 2009 World Aquatics Championships – Duet free routine =

Following are the results of the duet free routine synchronised swimming competition at the 2009 World Aquatics Championships held in Rome, Italy from July 17 to August 2, 2009.

== Results ==
Green denotes finalists

Rank	Diver	Nationality	Preliminary		Final	
Rank	Diver	Nationality	Points	Rank	Points	Rank
1st place, gold medalist(s)	Natalia Ishchenko; Svetlana Romashina	Russia	99.000	1	98.833	1
2nd place, silver medalist(s)	Andrea Fuentes; Gemma Mengual	Spain	97.833	2	98.333	2
3rd place, bronze medalist(s)	Jiang Tingting; Jiang Wenwen	China	96.666	3	97.000	3
4	Marie-Pier Boudreau Gagnon; Chloé Isaac	Canada	95.333	4	95.833	4
5	Beatrice Adelizzi; Giulia Lapi	Italy	94.667	5	95.334	5
6	Yukiko Inui; Mariko Sakai	Japan	94.500	6	94.000	6
7	Daria Iushko; Kseniya Sydorenko	Ukraine	93.500	7	93.000	7
8	Apolline Dreyfuss; Lila Meesseman-Bakir	France	92.000	8	92.000	8
9	Natalia Anthopoulou; Despoina Solomou	Greece	90.834	9	91.333	9
10	Olivia Allison; Jenna Randall	Great Britain	89.833	10	90.667	10
11	Nayara Figueira; Lara Teixeira	Brazil	89.000	11	89.500	11
12	Kim Yong Mi; Wang Ok Gyong	North Korea	88.167	12	88.500	12
13	Soňa Bernardová; Alžběta Dufková	Czech Republic	88.167	12	86.834	13
14	Park Hyunha; Park Hyunsun	South Korea	87.666	14		
15	Mariana Cifuentes; Evelyn Guajardo	Mexico	86.000	15		
16	Arna Toktagan; Amina Yermakhanova	Kazakhstan	85.000	16		
17	Sarah Amrein; Stephanie Jost	Switzerland	84.500	17		
17	Nadine Brandl; Elisabeth Mahn	Austria	84.500	17		
19	Anastasiya Mazgo; Darya Navaselskaya	Belarus	83.833	19		
20	Ester Levy; Viktoria Yarmolinskaya	Israel	83.333	20		
21	Reem Abd Elazem; Shaza El-Sayed	Egypt	80.333	21		
22	Anna Soto; Mary Soto	Venezuela	80.000	22		
22	Wiebke Jeske; Edith Zeppenfeld	Germany	80.000	22		
24	Margareta Jakovac; Carmen Pacadi	Croatia	79.666	24		
25	Júlia Győri; Julia Kiss	Hungary	78.333	25		
26	Valentina Popova; Anastasiya Ruzmetova	Uzbekistan	77.000	26		
26	Elena Radkova; Kalina Yordanova	Bulgaria	77.000	26		
28	Etel Sánchez; Sofía Sánchez	Argentina	76.833	28		
29	Rodriguez Gonzales; Darlys Lores Rodriguez	Cuba	75.000	29		
30	Cristina Nicolini; Elena Tini	San Marino	74.333	30		
31	Jodie Ng En Pei; Zhang Hui	Singapore	71.500	31		
32	Arsyi Sabihisma; Tri Eka Sandiri	Indonesia	69.500	32		
33	Cheong Ka Ieng; Lok Ka Man	Macau	68.500	33		
34	Lilit Davidyan; Margarita Ghazaryan	Armenia	56.333	34		
