= Synchronised swimming at the 2009 World Aquatics Championships – Duet technical routine =

Following are the results of the duet technical routine synchronised swimming competition at the 2009 World Aquatics Championships held in Rome, Italy from July 17 to August 2, 2009.

== Results ==
Green denotes finalists

Rank	Diver	Nationality	Preliminary		Final	
Rank	Diver	Nationality	Points	Rank	Points	Rank
1st place, gold medalist(s)	Anastasia Davydova; Svetlana Romashina	Russia	98.833	1	98.667	1
2nd place, silver medalist(s)	Andrea Fuentes; Gemma Mengual	Spain	97.500	2	97.333	2
3rd place, bronze medalist(s)	Jiang Tingting; Jiang Wenwen	China	96.166	3	95.667	3
4	Yukiko Inui; Chisa Kobayashi	Japan	94.667	4	94.333	4
5	Beatrice Adelizzi; Giulia Lapi	Italy	93.833	6	93.834	5
6	Tracy Little; Élise Marcotte	Canada	94.333	5	93.833	6
7	Daria Iushko; Kseniya Sydorenko	Ukraine	92.333	7	92.667	7
8	Apolline Dreyfuss; Lila Meesseman-Bakir	France	92.000	8	92.167	8
9	Natalia Anthopoulou; Despoina Solomou	Greece	91.833	9	90.833	9
10	Nayara Figueira; Lara Teixeira	Brazil	89.667	11	90.333	10
11	Olivia Allison; Jenna Randall	Great Britain	89.166	12	89.166	11
12	Meghan Kinney; Jillian Penner	United States	89.833	10	88.500	12
13	Soňa Bernardová; Alžběta Dufková	Czech Republic	87.167	13		
14	Mariana Cifuentes; Evelyn Guajardo	Mexico	86.667	14		
15	Park Hyunha; Park Hyunsun	South Korea	86.333	15		
16	Anastasia Gloushkov; Ester Levy	Israel	86.000	16		
16	Sarah Amrein; Stephanie Jost	Switzerland	86.000	16		
18	Nadine Brandl; Elisabeth Mahn	Austria	85.500	18		
19	Anastasiya Mazgo; Darya Navaselskaya	Belarus	84.333	19		
20	Wiebke Jeske; Edith Zeppenfeld	Germany	80.500	20		
21	Reem Abd Elazem; Dalia El Gebaly	Egypt	80.334	21		
22	Dorottya Kovács; Kata Stumpf	Hungary	79.334	22		
23	Anna Soto; Mary Soto	Venezuela	78.666	23		
24	Elena Radkova; Kalina Yordanova	Bulgaria	78.000	24		
25	Etel Sánchez; Sofía Sánchez	Argentina	77.833	25		
26	Valentina Popova; Anastasiya Ruzmetova	Uzbekistan	77.500	26		
27	Eloise Amberger; Sarah Bombell	Australia	76.667	27		
28	Cristina Nicolini; Elena Tini	San Marino	74.334	28		
29	Rodriguez Gonzales; Grisel Tendero Llada	Cuba	73.167	29		
30	Mei Shan Krishnan; Jodie Ng En Pei	Singapore	72.000	30		
31	Nadezhda Gómez; Violeta Mitinian	Costa Rica	71.667	31		
32	Lok Ka Man; Wong Cheng U	Macau	68.500	32		
33	Arsyi Sabihisma; Tri Eka Sandiri	Indonesia	66.334	33		
34	Lilit Davidyan; Margarita Ghazaryan	Armenia	56.833	34		
