= Yuliya Yefimova =

Russian swimmer (born 1992)

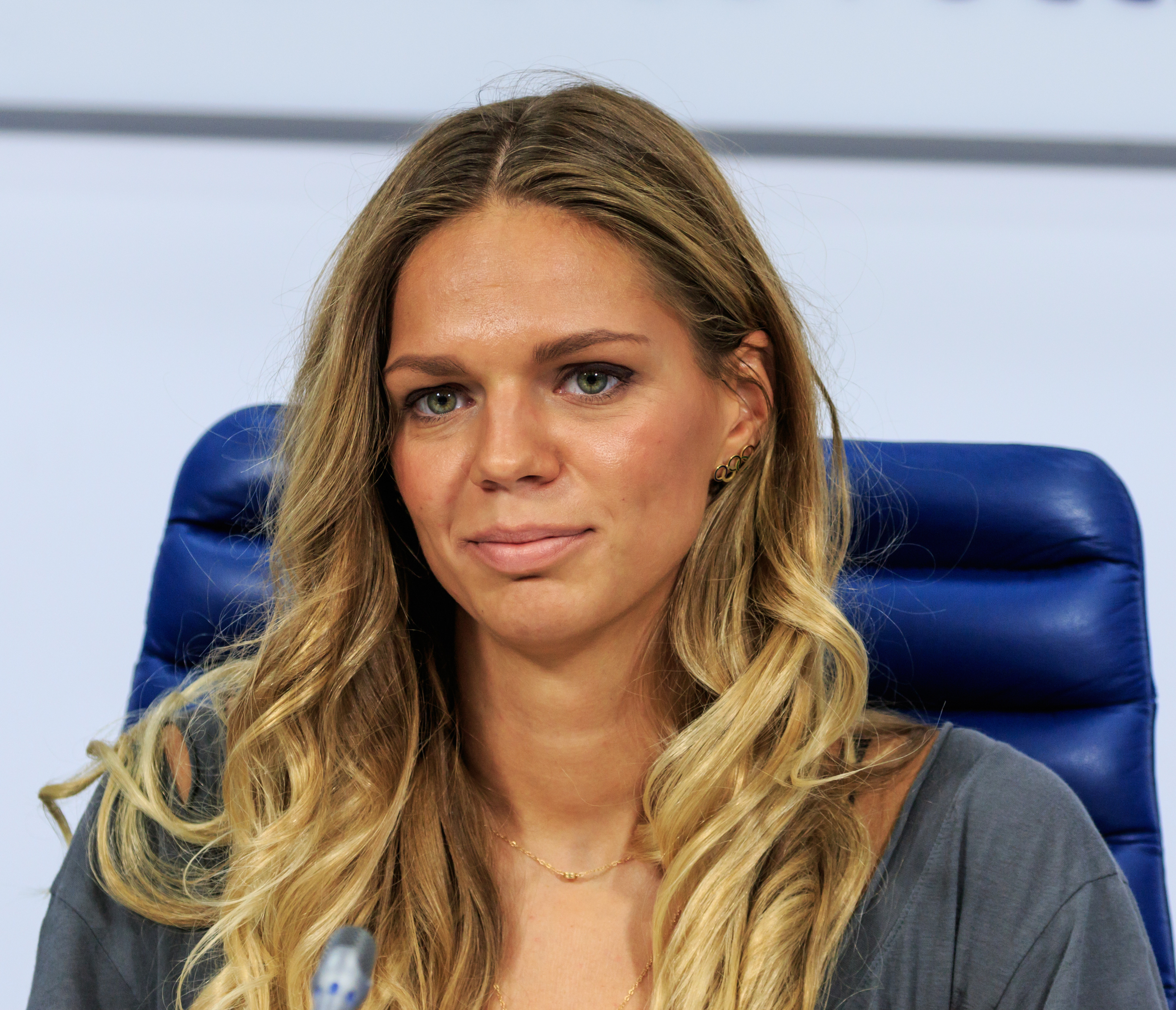
- Yefimova in 2016

Personal information
- Full name: Yuliya Andreyevna Yefimova
- National team: Russia
- Born: 3 April 1992 (age 34) Grozny, Chechen Republic
- Height: 1.78 m (5 ft 10 in)
- Weight: 64 kg (141 lb)

Sport
- Sport: Swimming
- Strokes: Breaststroke, individual medley
- Club: Volgodonsk Swim Club
- Coach: Dave Salo; Formerly Andrey Yefimov
Medal record
Women's swimming
Representing Neutral Athletes B
European Championships (LC)
Bronze medal – third place	2026 Paris	4×100 m medley
Representing Russia
Olympic Games
Silver medal – second place	2016 Rio de Janeiro	100 m breaststroke
Silver medal – second place	2016 Rio de Janeiro	200 m breaststroke
Bronze medal – third place	2012 London	200 m breaststroke
World Championships (LC)
Gold medal – first place	2009 Rome	50 m breaststroke
Gold medal – first place	2013 Barcelona	50 m breaststroke
Gold medal – first place	2013 Barcelona	200 m breaststroke
Gold medal – first place	2015 Kazan	100 m breaststroke
Gold medal – first place	2017 Budapest	200 m breaststroke
Gold medal – first place	2019 Gwangju	200 m breaststroke
Silver medal – second place	2009 Rome	100 m breaststroke
Silver medal – second place	2011 Shanghai	50 m breaststroke
Silver medal – second place	2011 Shanghai	200 m breaststroke
Silver medal – second place	2013 Barcelona	100 m breaststroke
Silver medal – second place	2017 Budapest	50 m breaststroke
Silver medal – second place	2017 Budapest	4×100 m medley
Silver medal – second place	2019 Gwangju	100 m breaststroke
Bronze medal – third place	2013 Barcelona	4×100 m medley
Bronze medal – third place	2015 Kazan	50 m breaststroke
Bronze medal – third place	2017 Budapest	100 m breaststroke
Bronze medal – third place	2019 Gwangju	50 m breaststroke
World Championships (SC)
Bronze medal – third place	2008 Manchester	200 m breaststroke
European Championships (LC)
Gold medal – first place	2008 Eindhoven	200 m breaststroke
Gold medal – first place	2010 Budapest	50 m breaststroke
Gold medal – first place	2010 Budapest	100 m breaststroke
Gold medal – first place	2018 Glasgow	50 m breaststroke
Gold medal – first place	2018 Glasgow	100 m breaststroke
Gold medal – first place	2018 Glasgow	200 m breaststroke
Gold medal – first place	2018 Glasgow	4×100 m medley
Silver medal – second place	2008 Eindhoven	50 m breaststroke
Silver medal – second place	2008 Eindhoven	4×100 m medley
Silver medal – second place	2018 Glasgow	4×100 m mixed medley
Silver medal – second place	2020 Budapest	4×100 m medley
Bronze medal – third place	2020 Budapest	50 m breaststroke
Bronze medal – third place	2020 Budapest	200 m breaststroke
European Championships (SC)
Gold medal – first place	2007 Debrecen	50 m breaststroke
Gold medal – first place	2007 Debrecen	100 m breaststroke
Gold medal – first place	2007 Debrecen	200 m breaststroke
Universiade
Gold medal – first place	2013 Kazan	50 m breaststroke
Gold medal – first place	2013 Kazan	100 m breaststroke
Gold medal – first place	2013 Kazan	200 m breaststroke
Gold medal – first place	2013 Kazan	4×100 m medley

Yuliya Andreyevna Yefimova (Russian: Юлия Андреевна Ефимова, also romanized Efimova; born 3 April 1992) is a Russian competitive swimmer. She is the Russian record holder in the 200 metre individual medley (short course), 50 metre breaststroke (short course and long course), 100 metre breaststroke (short course and long course), and 200 metre breaststroke (short course and long course). After making her Olympic debut in 2008, she went on to win the bronze medal in the 200 metre breaststroke in 2012, and silver medals in the 100 metre and 200 metre breaststroke in 2016. She is a six-time World Champion, winning the 50 metre breaststroke in 2009 and 2013, the 100 metre breaststroke in 2015, and the 200 metre breaststroke in 2013, 2017, and 2019. In 2019, she became the first woman to win the 200 metre breaststroke at a FINA World Aquatics Championships three times. She is a former world record holder in the long course 50 metre breaststroke. She has won 109 medals, including 48 gold medals, at Swimming World Cups.

After failing a drug test, Yefimova was disqualified from competition for 16 months, from October 2013 to February 2015, was stripped of her results and medals at the 2013 European Short Course Championships, and four of her world short-course records were invalidated.

== Personal life ==
Yefimova was born in Grozny. However, due to the First Chechen War, her family moved to Volgodonsk soon after. There she took up swimming at the age of six, coached by her father Andrey Yefimov. Until 2011, she lived in Taganrog, where she trained under Irina Vyatchanina and studied at the Southern Federal University. In March 2011, she moved to California, United States, where she was coached by Dave Salo, the head coach of the University of Southern California swimming team.

== Career ==
=== 2007–2009: World record at 17 years of age ===
Yefimova's first notable achievement was winning the 50 metre, 100 metre, and 200 metre breaststroke titles at the 2007 European Short Course Swimming Championships. At 15 years of age, she set her first European record and Russian national record in the short course 200 metre breaststroke with her time of 2:19.08 in the final that won her the gold medal in the event. At the 2008 European Aquatics Championships she was the gold medalist in the 200 metre breaststroke and the silver medalist in the 50 metre breaststroke. Yefimova competed at the 2008 Summer Olympics in Beijing when she was 16, placing fourth in the 100 metre breaststroke and fifth in the 200 metre breaststroke. In the prelims heats of the 100 metre breaststroke, she ranked second overall, swimming a new European record and Russian record time of 1:06.08 and finishing behind only Leisel Jones of Australia. At the 2009 World Aquatics Championships in Rome, Italy, Yefimova won the gold medal in the 50 metre breaststroke in a world record time of 30.09 seconds at 17 years of age.

=== 2010–2013 ===
Yefimova won gold medals at the 2010 European Aquatics Championships in the 50 metre and 100 metre breaststroke events. The following year, at the 2011 World Aquatics Championships, she won the silver medal in the 200 metre breaststroke with a Russian record time of 2:22.22, finishing less than one second behind the gold medalist in the event Rebecca Soni of the United States. In 2012, she earned the bronze medal in the 200 metre breaststroke at the 2012 Summer Olympics with a new European record time of 2:20.92. A year later, at the 2013 World Aquatics Championships in Barcelona, Yefimova triumphed in the 200 metre breaststroke with a time of 2:19.41. In the 50 metre breaststroke prelims heats, she achieved a new world record of 29.78 seconds. She won the finals, finishing first in 29.52 seconds.

=== Suspension, disqualifications ===
In January 2014, it was announced that Yefimova had failed an out of competition drug test in October 2013. Her positive test was for DHEA, an endogenous steroid hormone banned in professional sports. On 13 May 2014, she was disqualified by FINA for 16 months, from 31 October 2013 to 28 February 2015. She was stripped of her results and medals at the 2013 European Short Course Championships. Her four world short-course records (two relays and the 50 metre and 200 metre breaststroke set in November/December 2013) were also invalidated.

=== 2015 World Aquatics Championships ===
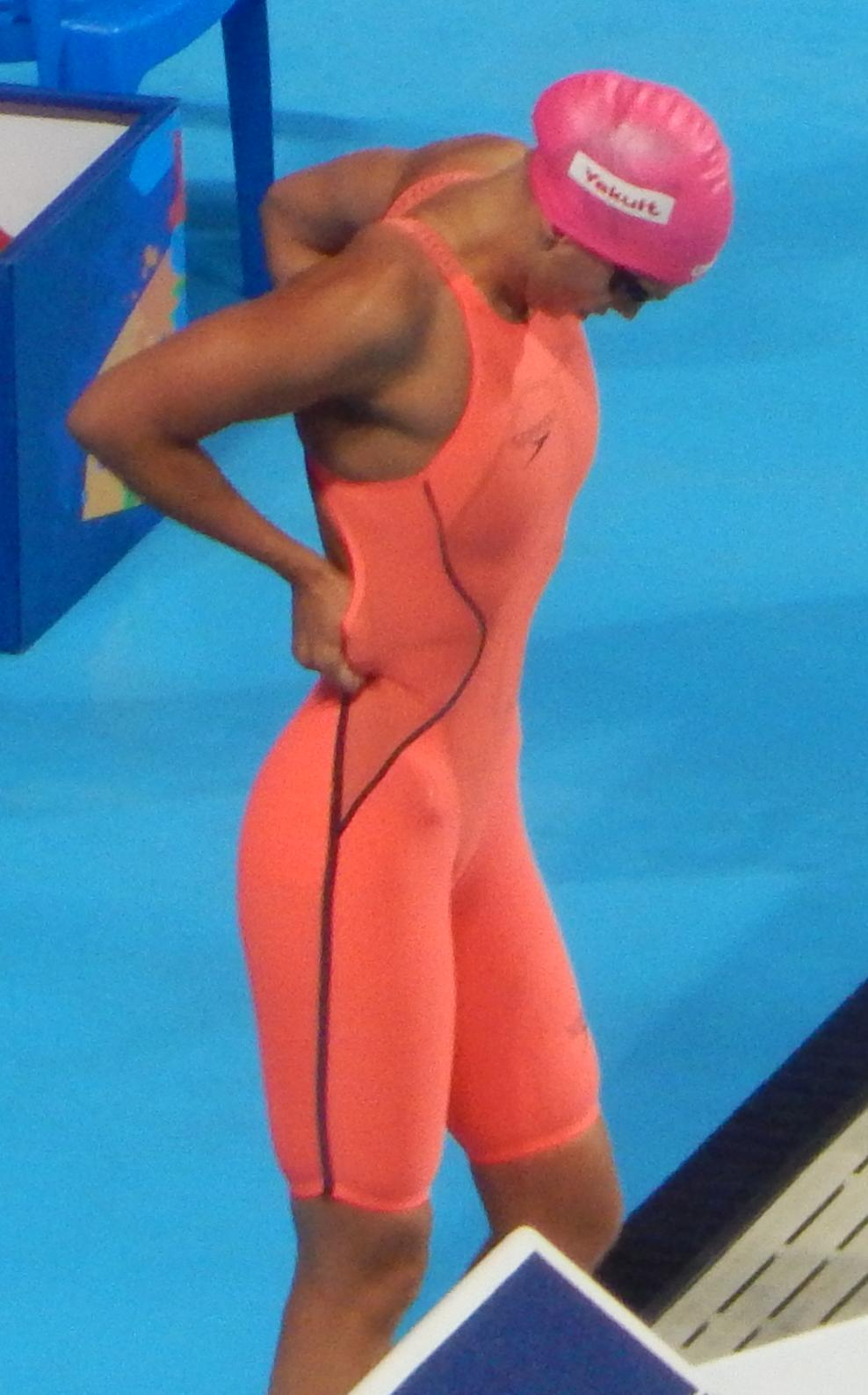
Yefimova during the 100 m event at the 2015 World Aquatics Championships

In August 2015, after 16 months of disqualification due to the positive drug test, Yefimova competed at the World Aquatics Championships in Kazan. She won a gold medal in the 100 metre breaststroke with a time of 1:05.66 that was seven tenths of a second faster than the next fastest swimmer, Rūta Meilutytė of Lithuania. In the 50 metre breaststroke Yefimova won the bronze medal at 30.13 seconds. In the 200 metre breaststroke she placed 17th in the prelims heats with a time of 2:26.11 and did not advance to the semifinals. She also placed fifth in the 4 × 100 metre mixed medley relay, splitting a 1:05.46 for the breaststroke leg of the relay.

=== 2016 ===
Between 15 February and 30 March 2016, Yefimova tested positive for meldonium six times in total. She was provisionally suspended from international competition by the International Swimming Federation (FINA) on 14 March. With no research on how long the drug stayed in a person's system, she was not banned or given a suspension. In June 2016, Yefimova returned to competition at the Los Angeles Invitational, winning the 200 metre breaststroke with a time of 2:22.77.

==== 2016 Summer Olympics ====
Yefimova was the silver medalist at the 2016 Summer Olympics in the 100 metre breaststroke and 200 metre breaststroke. She also helped set a new Russian national record as part of the 4 × 100 metre medley relay that placed sixth with a time of 3:55.66 in the finals, splitting the fastest breaststroke leg of all finals relays with a time of 1:04.98.

Yefimova's participation in the 2016 Summer Olympics was controversial due to doping within the Russian Olympic team. She was initially banned from participation due to her previous doping suspension, but this ban was overturned by the Court of Arbitration for Sport, allowing her to compete. During the Games, she was booed by spectators during each of her races. Yefimova was also criticized for taking performance-enhancing drugs by other swimmers, including Lilly King, who won the gold medal in the 100 metre breaststroke. Yefimova won the silver, and during the news conference afterwards, she was "on the verge of tears from the opening question about the boos directed at her." After Yefimova won silver in the 100 metre breaststroke, ESPN pushed back directly against her presence at the 2016 Olympic Games, stating "Yulia Efimova shouldn't have been in Rio at all". The treatment of Yefimova was also covered by The Washington Post, which pointed out the asymmetry in how people responded to Yefimova competing at the 2016 Summer Olympics compared to the response when Jessica Hardy of the United States competed at the 2012 Summer Olympics.

=== 2017 ===
At the 2017 New South Wales State Open Championships in March in Sydney, Australia, Yefimova won the 200 metre breaststroke event with a time of 2:28.80. She also won the 100 metre breaststroke with a time of 1:06.55. A month later, she won the 50 metre breaststroke at the 2017 Russian Championships with a time of 29.88 seconds.

==== 2017 World Aquatics Championships ====
2017 World Championships
Gold medal – first place	200 m breaststroke	2:19.64
Silver medal – second place	50 m breaststroke	29.57
Silver medal – second place	4×100 m medley	3:53.38 (ER)
Bronze medal – third place	100 m breaststroke	1:05.05

In July, at the 2017 World Aquatics Championships in Budapest, Hungary, Yefimova won the bronze medal in the 100 metre breaststroke in 1:05.05, finishing 0.92 seconds after the gold medalist, Lilly King, and 0.02 seconds after the silver medalist, Katie Meili. Her time of 1:04.36 in the semifinals set a new Russian record in the event. Three days later, she won the 200 metre breaststroke in 2:19.64, which was over two seconds faster than the next fastest swimmer and silver medalist in the event, Bethany Galat, and gave her the fifth World Championships title of her career. In the 4 × 100 metre medley relay, Yefimova won a silver medal and set a new European record and a new national record with her relay teammates in a time of 3:53.58; she split the fastest breaststroke leg out of all finals relays by over four tenths of a second with a time of 1:04.03. For the 50 metre breaststroke Yefimova won the silver medal in a time of 29.57 seconds, which was less than two tenths of a second slower than gold medalist Lilly King and over four tenths of a second faster than bronze medalist Katie Meili. In the 200 metre individual medley, Yefimova placed 14th in the semifinals with a time of 2:12.88 and did not qualify for the final.

=== 2018 European Aquatics Championships ===
In August 2018, at the 2018 European Aquatics Championships, held at Tollcross International Swimming Centre in Glasgow, Scotland, Yefimova won the gold medal in the 100 metre breaststroke with a championships record time of 1:05.53 in the final, breaking her own championships record she set in the semifinals at 1:05.87. In the 4 × 100 metre mixed medley relay, Yefimova split a 1:05.07 for the breaststroke leg of the relay, helping achieve a time of 3:42.71 with Kliment Kolesnikov, Svetlana Chimrova, and Vladimir Morozov to win the silver medal and set a new Russian record. Yefimova ranked fourteenth in the prelims heats of the 200 metre individual medley, qualified for the semifinals, and withdrew from competition, forgoing competing in the semifinals. She won the gold medal in the 200 metre breaststroke with a time of 2:21.31. In the 50 metre breaststroke, Yefimova won the gold medal after setting a championships record of 29.66 seconds in the semifinals. For the breaststroke leg of the 4 × 100 metre medley relay, Yefimova split a 1:03.95, helping win the gold medal and set a new championships record at 3:54.22. Yefimova was one of three swimmers to win four gold medals at the 2018 European Aquatics Championships along with Adam Peaty of Great Britain and Sarah Sjöström of Sweden.

=== 2019 World Aquatics Championships ===
2019 World Championships
Gold medal – first place	200 m breaststroke	2:20.17
Silver medal – second place	100 m breaststroke	1:05.49
Bronze medal – third place	50 m breaststroke	30.15

At the 2019 World Aquatics Championships in Gwangju, South Korea in July, Yefimova won the silver medal in the 100 metre breaststroke, finishing less than six-tenths of a second behind Lilly King of the United States with a time of 1:05.49. In the 200 metre breaststroke, Yefimova won the gold medal and became the first woman to win the 200 metre breaststroke world title at a World Aquatics Championships three times, finishing over two seconds ahead of Tatjana Schoenmaker of South Africa with a time of 2:20.17. Yefimova won the bronze medal in the 50 metre breaststroke, finishing third behind gold medalist Lilly King and silver medalist Benedetta Pilato of Italy in 30.15 seconds.

=== 2020 European Aquatics Championships ===
On 19 May 2021, Yefimova placed fourth in the 100 metre breaststroke at the 2020 European Aquatics Championships held at Danube Arena in Budapest, Hungary. The next day, Yefimova placed fourth as part of the 4 × 100 metre mixed medley relay, swimming the breaststroke leg of the relay and helping to finish in a time of 3:43.60. In the 200 metre breaststroke final on 21 May 2021, Yefimova won the bronze medal with a time of 2:22.16. She won a bronze medal in the 50 metre breaststroke as well, finishing with a 30.22 after gold medalist Benedetta Pilato and silver medalist Ida Hulkko of Finland. In the 4 × 100 metre medley relay, Yefimova won a silver medal, splitting a 1:05.77 for the breaststroke leg of the relay.

=== 2020 Summer Olympics ===
With her, and all other Russians's, outfit, national song, and cohort name selected by the International Olympic Committee, Yefimova competed in the 2020 Summer Olympic Games for the Russian Olympic Committee. These representation items stemmed from the Court of Arbitration for Sport ban on Russians due to widespread doping in Russia and lasting 24 months from December 2020 to December 2022.

At the 2020 Summer Olympics in Tokyo, Japan, held in the summer of 2021 due to the COVID-19 pandemic, Yefimova competed in two events. For the preliminary heats of the 100 metre breaststroke, she ranked eighth with a time of 1:06.21 and advanced to the semifinals, where she qualified for the final with a time of 1:06.47 and overall fifth-rank. In the final, she placed fifth with her time of 1:06.02. Her team was seventh in the prelims heats of the 4 × 100 metre medley relay and then placed seventh in the finals relay, as well.

=== 2021 Swimming World Cup ===
==== Stop 3: Doha ====
2021 World Cup — Doha
Gold medal – first place	200 m breaststroke	2:22.19
Gold medal – first place	100 m breaststroke	1:06.08
Gold medal – first place	50 m breaststroke	30.11

Yefimova competed in the third stop of the short course 2021 FINA Swimming World Cup in Doha, Qatar. She joined the competition at the Doha stop, the third of four stops in the year's World Cup circuit, after deciding not to compete at the first two stops. Yefimova entered to compete in all breaststroke events available to female swimmers at the Doha stop, which were the 50 metre breaststroke, 100 metre breaststroke, and 200 metre breaststroke races.

On the first day of competition, Yefomiva won the gold medal in the final of the 200 metre breaststroke, finishing over one second ahead of the next fastest swimmer with her time of 2:22.19. The next day she backed up her gold medal performance with another, this time winning the gold medal in the 100 metre breaststroke in a time of 1:06.08. In her final race of the Doha World Cup stop on day three, Yefimova won her third gold medal, swimming a time of 30.11 seconds in the final of the 50 metre breaststroke to win the event.

==== Stop 4: Kazan ====
2021 World Cup — Kazan
Gold medal – first place	100 m breaststroke	1:04.56
Silver medal – second place	200 m breaststroke	2:20.49
Silver medal – second place	50 m breaststroke	29.65

In the morning of day one of competition, Yefimova ranked third across all prelims heats in the 200 metre breaststroke with her time of 2:25.54 and qualified for the final in the evening. She finished second in the final with a time of 2:20.49, winning the silver medal in the event. The following morning, on 29 October, Yefimova advanced to the final ranked second for the 100 metre breaststroke from the prelims heats where she swam a 1:06.24. She dropped almost two seconds off her time from the prelims heats to win the gold medal in the final of the 100 metre breaststroke with a time of 1:04.56 that was one-hundredth of a second faster than the second-place finisher. On the last day of World Cup competition, Yefimova ranked first in the prelims heats of the 50 metre breaststroke with a time of 30.21, two-hundredths of a second ahead of the next-fastest competitor. In the final of the 50 metre breaststroke, she won the silver medal with a time of 29.65 seconds, one-hundredth of a second behind the gold medal winner in the event, Nika Godun. When points were summed across all four World Cup stops, Yefimova ranked tenth in terms of overall score for female competitors, second for female competitors from a country that hosted at least one World Cup stop, and first for female Russian competitors. Her total of six medals, four gold medals and two silver medals, ranked her eighth in total medals won by a female competitor.

=== 2022–2023 ===
Yefimova was impacted by a nationality ban enacted by LEN and implemented on 3 March 2022, which permanently banned all Russians and Belarusians from their competitions, including the 2022 European Aquatics Championships, with no date of re-entry communicated at the time the ban took effect. The second ban for her nationality came from FINA, which barred all Russians and Belarusians from their competitions effective 21 April 2022 and lasting at least through 31 December 2022. For non-FINA events from which she and other Russians were not banned, their times did not count towards world rankings nor world records. In April 2023, World Aquatics (formerly FINA) provided clarity that it had extended its 2022 ban in a back-acting manner, and the sanctions were indefinitely still in effect.

== Olympic Games and world championships results ==
Year	Competition	Venue	Position	Event	Notes
Representing Russia
2008	World Championships (SC)	Manchester, United Kingdom	DSQ	50 m breaststroke	—
2008	World Championships (SC)	Manchester, United Kingdom	5th	100 m breaststroke	1:05.71
2008	World Championships (SC)	Manchester, United Kingdom	3rd	200 m breaststroke	2:20.48
2008	World Championships (SC)	Manchester, United Kingdom	5th	4 × 100 m medley relay	3:58.38
2008	Olympic Games	Beijing, China	4th	100 m breaststroke	1:07.43
2008	Olympic Games	Beijing, China	5th	200 m breaststroke	2:23.76
2008	Olympic Games	Beijing, China	5th	4 × 100 m medley relay	3:57.84
2009	World Championships	Rome, Italy	1st	50 m breaststroke	30.09
2009	World Championships	Rome, Italy	2nd	100 m breaststroke	1:05.41
2009	World Championships	Rome, Italy	14th (sf)	200 m breaststroke	2:26.39
2011	World Championships	Shanghai, China	2nd	50 m breaststroke	30.49
2011	World Championships	Shanghai, China	4th	100 m breaststroke	1:06.56
2011	World Championships	Shanghai, China	2nd	200 m breaststroke	2:22.22
2011	World Championships	Shanghai, China	4th	4 × 100 m medley relay	3:57.38
2012	Olympic Games	London, United Kingdom	7th	100 m breaststroke	1:06.98
2012	Olympic Games	London, United Kingdom	3rd	200 m breaststroke	2:20.92
2012	Olympic Games	London, United Kingdom	4th	4 × 100 m medley relay	3:56.03
2013	World Championships	Barcelona, Spain	1st	50 m breaststroke	29.52
2013	World Championships	Barcelona, Spain	2nd	100 m breaststroke	1:05.02
2013	World Championships	Barcelona, Spain	1st	200 m breaststroke	2:19.41
2013	World Championships	Barcelona, Spain	3rd	4 × 100 m medley relay	3:56.47
2015	World Championships	Kazan, Russia	3rd	50 m breaststroke	30.13
2015	World Championships	Kazan, Russia	1st	100 m breaststroke	1:05.66
2015	World Championships	Kazan, Russia	17th (h)	200 m breaststroke	2:26.11
2015	World Championships	Kazan, Russia	5th	4 × 100 m mixed medley relay	3:44.83
2016	Olympic Games	Rio de Janeiro, Brazil	2nd	100 m breaststroke	1:05.50
2016	Olympic Games	Rio de Janeiro, Brazil	2nd	200 m breaststroke	2:21.97
2016	Olympic Games	Rio de Janeiro, Brazil	6th	4 × 100 m medley relay	3:55.66
2017	World Championships	Budapest, Hungary	2nd	50 m breaststroke	29.57
2017	World Championships	Budapest, Hungary	3rd	100 m breaststroke	1:05.05
2017	World Championships	Budapest, Hungary	1st	200 m breaststroke	2:19.64
2017	World Championships	Budapest, Hungary	14th (sf)	200 m individual medley	2:12.88
2017	World Championships	Budapest, Hungary	2nd	4 × 100 m medley relay	3:53.38
2019	World Championships	Gwangju, Korea	3rd	50 m breaststroke	30.15
2019	World Championships	Gwangju, Korea	2nd	100 m breaststroke	1:05.49
2019	World Championships	Gwangju, Korea	1st	200 m breaststroke	2:20.17
2021	Olympic Games	Tokyo, Japan	5th	100 m breaststroke	1:06.02
2021	Olympic Games	Tokyo, Japan	7th	4 × 100 m medley relay	3:56.93
(#) Indicates overall position achieved in the qualifying heats (h) or semifinals (sf)

== Career best times ==
=== Long course metres (50 m pool) ===
Event	Time		Meet	Location	Date	Notes	Ref
50 m breaststroke	29.52		2013 World Aquatics Championships	Barcelona, Spain	4 August 2013	NR	
100 m breaststroke	1:04.36	sf	2017 World Aquatics Championships	Budapest, Hungary	24 July 2017	NR	
200 m breaststroke	2:19.41		2013 World Aquatics Championships	Barcelona, Spain	2 August 2013	NR	

Legend: NR – Russian record; e – equalled existing record;
Records not set in finals: h – heat; sf – semifinal; r – relay 1st leg; rh – relay heat 1st leg; b – B final; † – en route to final mark; so – swim-off; tt – time trial

=== Short course metres (25 m pool) ===
Event	Time	Meet	Location	Date	Notes	Ref
50 m breaststroke	29.08	2016 FINA Swimming World Cup	Berlin, Germany	31 August 2016	NR	
100 m breaststroke	1:02.91	2016 FINA Swimming World Cup	Moscow	3 September 2016	NR	
200 m breaststroke	2:15.62	2018 FINA Swimming World Cup	Eindhoven, Netherlands	28 September 2018	NR	
200 m individual medley	2:06.79	2016 FINA Swimming World Cup	Moscow	3 September 2016	NR	

Legend: NR — Russian record

== Swimming World Cup circuits ==
The following medals Yefimova has won at Swimming World Cup circuits.

Edition	Gold medals	Silver medals	Bronze medals	Total
2007	8	1	0	9
2010	4	1	0	5
2011	0	2	2	4
2013	4	5	0	9
2016	15	26	10	51
2017	1	0	1	2
2018	12	10	1	23
2021	4	2	0	6
Total	48	47	14	109

== World records ==
=== Long course metres ===
No.	Event	Time		Meet	Location	Date	Age	Status	Ref
1	50 m breaststroke	30.09		2009 World Aquatics Championships	Rome, Italy	2 August 2009	17	Former	
2	50 m breaststroke (2)	29.78	h	2013 World Aquatics Championships	Barcelona, Spain	3 August 2013	21	Former	

Legend: h — heat

== Continental and national records ==
=== Long course metres ===
No.	Event	Time		Meet	Location	Date	Age	Type	Status	Notes	Ref
1	100 m breaststroke	1:06.08	h	2008 Summer Olympics	Beijing, China	10 August 2008	16	ER, NR	Former		
2	4 × 100 m medley relay	3:57.84		2008 Summer Olympics	Beijing, China	17 August 2008	16	NR	Former		
3	100 m breaststroke (2)	1:05.41		2009 World Championships	Rome, Italy	28 July 2009	17	ER, NR	Former		
4	50 m breaststroke	30.09		2009 World Championships	Rome, Italy	2 August 2009	17	ER, NR	Former	Former WR	
5	200 m breaststroke	2:22.22		2011 World Championships	Shanghai, China	29 July 2011	19	NR	Former		
6	4 × 100 m medley relay (2)	3:57.38		2011 World Championships	Shanghai, China	30 July 2011	19	NR	Former		
7	200 m breaststroke (2)	2:20.92		2012 Summer Olympics	London, England	2 August 2012	20	ER, NR	Former		
8	4 × 100 m medley relay (3)	3:56.03		2012 Summer Olympics	London, England	4 August 2012	20	NR	Former		
9	100 m breaststroke (3)	1:05.02		2013 World Championships	Barcelona, Spain	30 July 2013	21	NR	Former		
10	200 m breaststroke (3)	2:19.41		2013 World Championships	Barcelona, Spain	2 August 2013	21	NR	Current		
11	50 m breaststroke (2)	29.78	h	2013 World Championships	Barcelona, Spain	3 August 2013	21	ER, NR	Former	Former WR	
12	50 m breaststroke (3)	29.52		2013 World Championships	Barcelona, Spain	4 August 2013	21	NR	Current		
13	4 × 100 m medley relay (4)	3:55.66		2016 Summer Olympics	Rio de Janeiro, Brazil	13 August 2016	24	NR	Former		
14	100 m breaststroke (4)	1:04.82		2017 Mare Nostrum	Canet-en-Roussillon, France	17 June 2017	25	NR	Former		
15	100 m breaststroke (5)	1:04.36	sf	2017 World Championships	Budapest, Hungary	24 July 2017	25	NR	Current		
16	4 × 100 m medley relay (5)	3:53.38		2017 World Championships	Budapest, Hungary	30 July 2017	25	ER, NR	Current		
17	4 × 100 m mixed medley relay	3:42.71		2018 European Championships	Glasgow, Scotland	6 August 2018	26	NR	Former		

Legend: WR – World record; ER – European record; NR – Russian record; e – equalled existing record;
Records not set in finals: h – heat; sf – semifinal; r – relay 1st leg; rh – relay heat 1st leg; b – B final; † – en route to final mark; so – swim-off; tt – time trial

=== Short course metres ===
No.	Event	Time	Meet	Location	Date	Age	Type	Status	Ref
1	200 m breaststroke	2:19.08	2007 European Championships	Debrecen, Hungary	14 December 2007	15	ER, NR	Former	
2	4 × 100 m medley relay	3:53.08	2010 World Championships	Dubai, United Arab Emirates	17 December 2010	18	NR	Former	
3	50 m breaststroke	29.08	2016 Swimming World Cup	Berlin, Germany	31 August 2016	24	NR	Current	
4	100 m breaststroke	1:02.91	2016 Swimming World Cup	Moscow	3 September 2016	24	NR	Current	
5	200 m individual medley	2:06.79	2016 Swimming World Cup	Moscow	3 September 2016	24	NR	Current	
6	200 m breaststroke (2)	2:16.54	2016 Swimming World Cup	Moscow	4 September 2016	24	NR	Former	
7	200 m breaststroke (3)	2:16.39	2016 Swimming World Cup	Doha, Qatar	9 October 2016	24	NR	Former	
8	200 m breaststroke (4)	2:15.62	2018 Swimming World Cup	Eindhoven, Netherlands	28 September 2018	26	NR	Current	

Legend: ER – European record; NR – Russian record; e – equalled existing record;
Records not set in finals: h – heat; sf – semifinal; r – relay 1st leg; rh – relay heat 1st leg; b – B final; † – en route to final mark; so – swim-off; tt – time trial

== Awards and honours ==
- Russian Female Swimmer of the Year (2008 and 2015)
- Honorary citizen of Volgodonsk (since 2008)
- Medal of the Order "For Merit to the Fatherland" (2012)
- Order of Friendship (2016)
- Sportswoman of the Year from the All-Russia Swimming Federation (2017)
- SwimSwam, Top 100 (Women's): 2021 (#7), 2022 (#85)

Records
Preceded by (Canada) Amanda Reason (United States) Jessica Hardy	Women's 50 m breaststroke world record holder (long course); 2 – 6 August 2009; 3 August 2013	Succeeded by (United States) Jessica Hardy (Lithuania) Rūta Meilutytė
Preceded by (Lithuania) Rūta Meilutytė	Women's 100 m breaststroke European record holder (long course); 5 August 2018 – present	Succeeded by Incumbent
Preceded by (Serbia) Nađa Higl	Women's 200 m breaststroke European record holder (long course); 2 August 2012 – 29 March 2013	Succeeded by (Denmark) Rikke Møller Pedersen
