= Yuliya Maryanko =

Ukrainian synchronised swimmer

Personal information
- Nationality: Ukrainian
- Born: 15 February 1988 (age 38) Mykolaiv, Ukrainian SSR, Soviet Union

Sport
- Sport: Swimming
- Strokes: Synchronised swimming
Medal record
Women's synchronised swimming
Representing Ukraine
Event	1st	2nd	3rd
European Championships	0	0	4
European Junior Championships	0	0	1
Total	0	0	5
European Championships
Bronze medal – third place	2008 Eindhoven	Team routine
Bronze medal – third place	2008 Eindhoven	Combination routine
Bronze medal – third place	2010 Budapest	Team routine
Bronze medal – third place	2010 Budapest	Combination routine
European Junior Championships
Bronze medal – third place	2006 Bonn	Free routine combination

Yuliya Vitaliivna Maryanko (Ukrainian: Юлія Віталіївна Мар'янко, also known as Yuliya Levitskiy; born 15 February 1988) is a retired Ukrainian synchronised swimmer.

== Early life and education ==
She was born on 15 February 1988 in Mykolaiv, Ukraine. Her mother is Tetyana Maryanko, Ukrainian diving coach, Merited Master of Sport of the USSR and Merited Coach of Ukraine in diving. Illya Kvasha, bronze medalist of 2008 Summer Olympics in 3 m synchro, is a pupil of Tetyana Maryanko.

In 2010, Yuliya graduated from the Kharkiv State Academy of Physical Culture.

== Career ==
In 2006, Yuliya Maryanko won a bronze medal in free routine combination event at the 2006 European Junior Synchronised Swimming Championships, held in Bonn.

In 2007, Yulia won a Ukrainian Synchronized Swimming Cup in duet and ream routine events, representing Kharkiv Oblast.

She competed at the 2009 World Aquatics Championships in team technical and free combination routines events without reaching any medals.

The following years, Yuliya competed at the 2008 European Aquatics Championships, held in Eindhoven, where she received two bronze medals in team free routine and free routine combination events.

In 2009, she represented Ukraine at the 2009 European Synchronized Swimming Champions Cup, held in Andorra la Vella, where she received a bronze medal in duet routine.

In 2010, Yuliya competed at the FINA Synchro World Trophy 2010, held in Russia, where she received a bronze medal in team thematic routine event.

Also she competed at the 2010 European Aquatics Championships, held in Budapest, where she won two bronze medals in team combination routine and team routine events.

== Personal life ==
In 2011, she moved to the United States and studied at the Ohio State University in 2011–2014. There she competed at the 2011 and 2012 U.S. National Synchronised Swimming Championships, representing the Ohio State, where she received overall 3 gold medals in duet and trio routines.

According to her Instagram page, she is living in Texas since 2021 and became a founder of authentic luxury resale boutique "Pre Owned Luxury" in 2021.

== Position of Russian invasion of Ukraine ==
She supported Ukraine during the Russian invasion of Ukraine. Yuliya wrote in her Instagram page: "But standing aside unfortunately will not guarantee a protection of them. Evil actions will not stop by taking over Ukraine. It will go further if we don't stop the Tyrant".
