= Serhiy Bubka College of Olympic Reserve =

Sports college in Donetsk

Serhiy Bubka College of Olympic Reserve (Ukrainian: Донецьке вище училище олімпійського резерву імені Сергія Бубки, ДВУОР ім. С. Бубки; Russian: Донецкое училище олимпийского резерва им. Сергея Бубки) is a sports college in Donetsk.

== Brief description ==
The college was established on 18 August 1989 on the basis of the Donetsk Tekhnikum of Physical Culture.

In 1995 the college was named after Ukrainian pole jumper and the president of the National Olympic Committee of Ukraine, Serhiy Bubka.

== Notable alumni ==
- Lilia Podkopaeva
- Yaroslav Rakitskyi
- Serhiy Rebrov
- Oleksandr Filippov
- Inga Giller

== See also ==
- National University of Physical Education and Sport of Ukraine
- FC Olimpik Donetsk
