= Andrey Yefimov =

Russian swimming coach (born 1960)

- Born: Andrey Mikhailovich Yefimov; December 2, 1960 (age 64); Grozny, RSFSR, USSR
- Occupation: coach for swimming
- Spouse: Tatyana Yefimova (divorced)

Andrey Mikhailovich Yefimov (Russian: Андрей Михайлович Ефимов; born December 2, 1960) is a Russian swimming coach. He has received the Russian Honored Coach award. Among his pupils is his daughter, athlete Yuliya Yefimova.

== Biography ==
Yefimov was born on December 2, 1960. Together with his family, he moved from Grozny to Volgodonsk at the start of the First Chechen war.

He was a coach of the TSP of the Tyumen Oblast and Volgodonsk. Since 2006, he has been a member of the Russian national team. He coached Olympic bronze medalist, and four-time world champion, Yuliya Yefimova and master of sports of the international class Kristina Krasyukova.

He was his daughter, Yuliya Yefimova's first coach; she started swimming at age six.

In 2013, Yefimov moved to Tyumen to work in the regional specialized children's and youth sports school of the Olympic reserve to prepare young athletes for the competition in Tyumen.

June 2, 2017, Yefimov was awarded the Medal of the Order For Merit to the Fatherland of the II degree. He is helping his daughter prepare for the 2020 Olympic Games of 2020.
