= Nadiya Berezhna =

Ukrainian synchronised swimmer

Personal information
- Nationality: Ukrainian
- Born: 9 April 1988 (age 38) Kharkiv, Ukrainian SSR, Soviet Union

Sport
- Sport: Swimming
- Strokes: Synchronised swimming
Medal record
Women's synchronised swimming
Representing Ukraine
Event	1st	2nd	3rd
European Championships	0	0	2
European Junior Championships	0	0	1
Total	0	0	3
European Championships
Bronze medal – third place	2008 Eindhoven	Team routine
Bronze medal – third place	2008 Eindhoven	Combination routine
European Junior Championships
Bronze medal – third place	2006 Bonn	Free routine combination

Nadiya Berezhna (Ukrainian: Надія Бережна; born 9 April 1988 in Kharkiv, Ukraine) is a retired Ukrainian synchronised swimmer.

== Career ==
In 2006, Nadiya Berezhna won a bronze medal in free routine combination event at the 2006 European Junior Synchronised Swimming Championships, held in Bonn.

She competed at the 2007 World Aquatics Championships and 2009 World Aquatics Championships in team technical routine, team free routine and free combination routine events without reaching any medals.

The following years, Nadiya competed at the 2008 European Aquatics Championships, held in Eindhoven, where she received two bronze medals in team free routine and free routine combination events.
