= Swimming at the 2012 European Aquatics Championships – Men's 1500 metre freestyle =

Men's 1500 metre freestyle at the 2012 European Aquatics Championships
- Dates: May 22, 2012 (heats); May 23, 2012 (final)
- Competitors: 22 from 15 nations
- Winning time: 14:48.92

Medalists
gold medal	Gregorio Paltrinieri	Italy
silver medal	Gergő Kis	Hungary
bronze medal	Gergely Gyurta	Hungary

The men's 1500 metre freestyle competition of the swimming events at the 2012 European Aquatics Championships took place May 22 and 23. The heats took place on May 22, the final on May 23.

== Records ==
Prior to the competition, the existing world, European and championship records were as follows.

	Name	Nation	Time	Location	Date
World record	Sun Yang	China	14:34.14	Shanghai	July 31, 2011
European record	Yury Prilukov	Russia	14:41.13	Beijing	August 15, 2008
Championship record	Yury Prilukov	Russia	14:50.40	Eindhoven	March 22, 2008

== Results ==
=== Heats ===
23 swimmers participated in 3 heats.

Rank	Heat	Lane	Name	Nationality	Time	Notes
1	2	4	Samuel Pizzetti	Italy	15:10.26	Q
2	2	5	Gregorio Paltrinieri	Italy	15:11.06	Q
3	1	3	Gergely Gyurta	Hungary	15:15.01	Q
4	2	6	Jan Wolfgarten	Germany	15:18.39	Q
5	3	4	Gergő Kis	Hungary	15:20.66	Q
6	3	3	Sergiy Frolov	Ukraine	15:21.49	Q
7	3	5	Anthony Pannier	France	15:24.11	Q
8	3	2	Sören Meissner	Germany	15:24.18	Q
9	1	5	Damien Joly	France	15:25.81	
10	3	6	Evgeny Kulikov	Russia	15:26.52	
11	3	8	David Brandl	Austria	15:28.99	
12	1	1	Richárd Nagy	Slovakia	15:30.77	NR
13	2	2	Ediz Yildirimer	Turkey	15:31.78	
14	1	4	Rocco Potenza	Italy	15:32.69	
15	2	3	Federico Colbertaldo	Italy	15:34.53	
16	1	7	Jan Micka	Czech Republic	15:36.81	
17	1	6	Antonio Arroyo Perez	Spain	15:37.59	
18	2	1	Anton Goncharov	Ukraine	15:37.78	
19	1	2	Ventsislav Aydarski	Bulgaria	15:38.45	
20	3	7	Anton Sveinn McKee	Iceland	15:39.63	NR
21	2	7	Uladzimir Zhyharau	Belarus	15:42.85	
22	3	1	Jovan Mitrovic	Switzerland	15:46.49	
	2	8	Stefan Šorak	Serbia	DNS	

=== Final ===
The final was held at 17:02.

Rank	Lane	Name	Nationality	Time	Notes
1st place, gold medalist(s)	5	Gregorio Paltrinieri	Italy	14:48.92	CR
2nd place, silver medalist(s)	2	Gergő Kis	Hungary	14:58.15	
3rd place, bronze medalist(s)	3	Gergely Gyurta	Hungary	15:04.38	
4	4	Samuel Pizzetti	Italy	15:09.83	
5	1	Anthony Pannier	France	15:12.02	
6	6	Jan Wolfgarten	Germany	15:13.68	
7	7	Sergiy Frolov	Ukraine	15:13.99	
8	8	Sören Meissner	Germany	15:19.50	
