= Swimming at the 2012 European Aquatics Championships – Men's 800 metre freestyle =

Men's 800 metre freestyle at the 2012 European Aquatics Championships
- Dates: May 24, 2012 (heats); May 25, 2012 (final)
- Competitors: 20 from 12 nations
- Winning time: 7:49.46

Medalists
gold medal	Gergő Kis	Hungary
silver medal	Gregorio Paltrinieri	Italy
bronze medal	Sergiy Frolov	Ukraine

The men's 800 metre freestyle competition of the swimming events at the 2012 European Aquatics Championships took place May 24 and 25. The heats took place on May 24, the final on May 25.

== Records ==
Prior to the competition, the existing world, European and championship records were as follows.

	Name	Nation	Time	Location	Date
World record	Zhang Lin	China	7:32.12	Rome	July 29, 2009
European record	Federico Colbertaldo	Italy	7:43.84	Rome	July 29, 2009
Championship record	Sébastien Rouault	France	7:48.28	Budapest	August 13, 2010

== Results ==
=== Heats ===
21 swimmers participated in 3 heats.

Rank	Heat	Lane	Name	Nationality	Time	Notes
1	2	2	Sergiy Frolov	Ukraine	7:57.54	Q
2	3	6	Gabriele Detti	Italy	7:57.61	Q
3	1	4	Gregorio Paltrinieri	Italy	7:57.92	Q
4	2	4	Sébastien Rouault	France	7:57.94	Q
5	3	4	Gergő Kis	Hungary	7:58.09	Q
6	2	3	Evgeny Kulikov	Russia	8:00.86	Q
7	1	1	Maxym Shemberyev	Ukraine	8:02.41	Q
8	3	2	David Brandl	Austria	8:03.73	Q
9	3	1	Sören Meissner	Germany	8:03.82	
10	2	5	Anthony Pannier	France	8:04.00	
11	3	3	Gergely Gyurta	Hungary	8:04.03	
12	1	6	Anton Goncharov	Ukraine	8:06.81	
13	1	5	Federico Colbertaldo	Italy	8:08.04	
14	1	7	Anton Sveinn McKee	Iceland	8:08.58	NR
15	3	5	Rocco Potenza	Italy	8:08.60	
16	1	3	Jan Wolfgarten	Germany	8:12.79	
17	1	2	Uladzimir Zhyharau	Belarus	8:15.48	
18	2	1	Ventsislav Aydarski	Bulgaria	8:16.03	
19	3	7	Jovan Mitrovic	Switzerland	8:16.08	
20	2	7	Jan Karel Petric	Slovenia	8:23.42	
	2	6	Michal Szuba	Poland	DNS	

=== Final ===
The final was held at 17:02.

Rank	Lane	Name	Nationality	Time	Notes
1st place, gold medalist(s)	2	Gergő Kis	Hungary	7:49.46	
2nd place, silver medalist(s)	3	Gregorio Paltrinieri	Italy	7:52.23	
3rd place, bronze medalist(s)	4	Sergiy Frolov	Ukraine	7:52.81	
4	6	Sébastien Rouault	France	7:53.78	
5	5	Gabriele Detti	Italy	7:56.16	
6	7	Evgeny Kulikov	Russia	7:59.90	
7	1	Maxym Shemberyev	Ukraine	8:00.96	
8	8	David Brandl	Austria	8:03.28	
