= Anna Bagirova =

Ukrainian synchronised swimmer

Personal information
- Nationality: Ukrainian
- Born: 16 December 1987 (age 38) Donetsk, Ukrainian SSR, Soviet Union

Sport
- Sport: Swimming
- Strokes: Synchronised swimming
Medal record
Women's synchronised swimming
Representing Ukraine
Event	1st	2nd	3rd
European Championships	0	0	2
European Junior Championships	0	1	1
Total	0	1	3
European Championships
Bronze medal – third place	2008 Eindhoven	Team routine
Bronze medal – third place	2008 Eindhoven	Combination routine
European Junior Championships
Silver medal – second place	2003 Andorra la Vella	Free routine combination
Bronze medal – third place	2003 Andorra la Vella	Team routine

Anna Bagirova (Ukrainian: Ганна Багірова; born 16 December 1987 in Donetsk, Ukraine) is a retired Ukrainian synchronised swimmer.

== Career ==
In 2003, Anna won a silver medal in free routine combination and a bronze one in team routine events at the 2003 European Junior Synchronised Swimming Championships, held in Andorra la Vella.

She competed at the 2005 World Aquatics Championships, 2007 World Aquatics Championships and 2009 World Aquatics Championships without reaching any medals.

The following years, Anna competed at the 2008 European Aquatics Championships, held in Eindhoven, where she received two bronze medals in team free routine and free routine combination events.
