= Inga Giller =

Ukrainian synchronised swimmer

Personal information
- Native name: Інга Ігоревна Гіллер
- Nationality: Ukrainian
- Born: 23 September 1991 (age 34) Donetsk, Ukrainian SSR, Soviet Union

Sport
- Sport: Swimming
- Strokes: Synchronised swimming
Medal record
Women's synchronised swimming
Representing Ukraine
Event	1st	2nd	3rd
European Championships	0	0	3
European Junior Championships	0	2	2
Total	0	2	5
European Championships
Bronze medal – third place	2008 Eindhoven	Combination routine
Bronze medal – third place	2010 Budapest	Team routine
Bronze medal – third place	2010 Budapest	Combination routine
European Junior Championships
Silver medal – second place	2009 Gloucester	Team routine
Silver medal – second place	2009 Gloucester	Free routine combination
Bronze medal – third place	2006 Bonn	Free routine combination
Bronze medal – third place	2007 Callela	Free routine combination

Inga Ihorivna Giller (Ukrainian: Інга Ігорівна Гіллер; born 1991) is a retired Ukrainian synchronised swimmer.

== Early life and education ==
Giller was born 23 September 1991, in Donetsk, Ukraine. She studied at the Serhiy Bubka College of Olympic Reserve.

== Career ==
In 2006, Inga Giller won a bronze medal in free routine combination event at the 2006 European Junior Synchronized Swimming Championships, held in Bonn.

The following year, she won a bronze medal in free combination routine event at the European Junior Championships. She also competed at the 2007 World Aquatics Championships, though she did not medal.

In 2008, Giller competed at the 2008 European Aquatics Championships, held in Eindhoven, where she received a bronze medal in free routine combination event.

The following year, she competed at the 2009 European Junior Synchronised Swimming Championships, held in Gloucester, where she received two silver medals: one in the team routine and one in the free routine combination. She also competed at the 2009 World Aquatics Championships; though she didn't medal, she earned her personal best scores for her appearances at the World Aquatics Championships, earning a 92.5000 in the women's team technical, 92.6670 in the women's team free, and 94.3340 in the women's team free combination.

Giller competed at the 2010 European Aquatics Championships in Budapest, where she won bronze medals in team combination routine and team routine events.

She also competed at the 2011 World Aquatics Championships without earning any medals.

== Personal life ==
Giller lives in Los Angeles and has worked as a boxing coach since 2020. She also makes the fitness articles in popular fitness web-site BetterMe.
