= Gergő Kis =

Hungarian swimmer (born 1988)

Personal information
- Full name: Gergő Szabolcs Kis
- Nationality: Hungary
- Born: 19 January 1988 (age 38) Tapolca, Veszprém
- Height: 1.83 m (6 ft 0 in)
- Weight: 72 kg (159 lb)

Sport
- Sport: Swimming
- Strokes: Freestyle and medley
- Club: Rája 94 Úszóklub
Medal record
World Championships (LC)
| Bronze medal – third place | 2011 Shanghai | 800 m freestyle |
| Bronze medal – third place | 2011 Shanghai | 1500 m freestyle |
European Championships (LC)
| Gold medal – first place | 2008 Eindhoven | 800 m freestyle |
| Gold medal – first place | 2012 Debrecen | 800 m freestyle |
| Silver medal – second place | 2012 Debrecen | 400 m freestyle |
| Silver medal – second place | 2012 Debrecen | 1500 m freestyle |
| Bronze medal – third place | 2010 Budapest | 400 m freestyle |
| Bronze medal – third place | 2012 Debrecen | 4x200 m freestyle |
European Championships (SC)
| Silver medal – second place | 2007 Debrecen | 1500 m freestyle |
| Silver medal – second place | 2008 Rijeka | 400 m medley |
| Bronze medal – third place | 2007 Debrecen | 400 m freestyle |

Gergő Szabolcs Kis (born 19 January 1988 in Tapolca) is a Hungarian freestyle swimmer.

Kis participated in the 2004 Summer Olympics in the men's 1500 m freestyle, ranking 23rd in the heats. In the 2006 European Junior Swimming Championships he won the gold medal in the 400 metres individual medley setting a championship record of 4:16.82, won the silver medal in the 200 meter butterfly, and finished 4th in the 1500 metre freestyle.

In the 2007 European Short Course Swimming Championships he finished third in the 400 metre freestyle and won silver in the 1500 metre freestyle.

In 2008 at the European Championships he won the gold medal in the 800 metre freestyle held for the first time. He won a bronze medal at the 2010 European Aquatics Championships in 400 metre freestyle and came fourth in 800 metre freestyle.

At the 2011 World Championships in Shanghai, Kis made history by becoming the first Hungarian man to win a freestyle medal at the World Aquatics Championships, a bronze in the 800 m. This was considerably prominent given the successes of Hungarian swimmers in other strokes.

At the 2012 Summer Olympics, he competed in the 400 and 1500 m freestyle and was part of Hungary's 4 × 100 m and 4 × 200 m freestyle teams. He finished 6th in the 400 m final, 19th in the 1500 m, the 4 × 100 m team came 14th and the 4 × 200 m team came eighth in the final.

At the 2016 Summer Olympics, he competed in the 400 m freestyle and the 4 × 200 m freestyle relay.
