= Anastasiya Chepak =

Ukrainian synchronised swimmer

Personal information
- Nationality: Ukrainian
- Born: 5 July 1985 (age 40) Donetsk, Ukrainian SSR, Soviet Union

Sport
- Sport: Swimming
- Strokes: Synchronised swimming
Medal record
Women's synchronised swimming
Representing Ukraine
Event	1st	2nd	3rd
European Championships	0	0	2
European Junior Championships	0	2	2
Total	0	2	4
European Championships
Bronze medal – third place	2008 Eindhoven	Team routine
Bronze medal – third place	2008 Eindhoven	Combination routine
European Junior Championships
Silver medal – second place	2001 Kharkiv	Team routine
Silver medal – second place	2003 Andorra la Vella	Free routine combination
Bronze medal – third place	2002 Moscow	Team routine
Bronze medal – third place	2003 Andorra la Vella	Team routine

Anastasiya Chepak (Ukrainian: Анастасія Чепак; born 5 July 1985) is a retired Ukrainian synchronised swimmer.

== Career ==
Chepak was born in Donetsk. In 2001, she competed at the 2001 European Junior Synchronised Swimming Championships, held in Kharkiv, where she received a silver medal in team routine event. At the next European junior championships, held in Moscow, she won a bronze medal in team routine event.

Anastasiya also won a silver medal in free routine combination event and also a bronze one in team routine event at the 2003 European Junior Synchronised Swimming Championships, held in Andorra la Vella.

She competed at the 2003 World Aquatics Championships in team routine and free routine combination events, and also in 2007 World Aquatics Championships in team technical and team free routines events without winning any medals.

The following years, Anastasiya competed at the 2008 European Aquatics Championships, held in Eindhoven, where she received two bronze medals in team free routine and free routine combination events.

She studied at the Donetsk National University.

She coached the Thailand national synchronised swimming team in 2010 for a few months. Then she became a head coach assistant of Ukrainian national team.

Since 2012 she has been a head coach and choreographer of the Egyptian artistic swimming national team.
