= Apolline Dreyfuss =

French synchronized swimmer

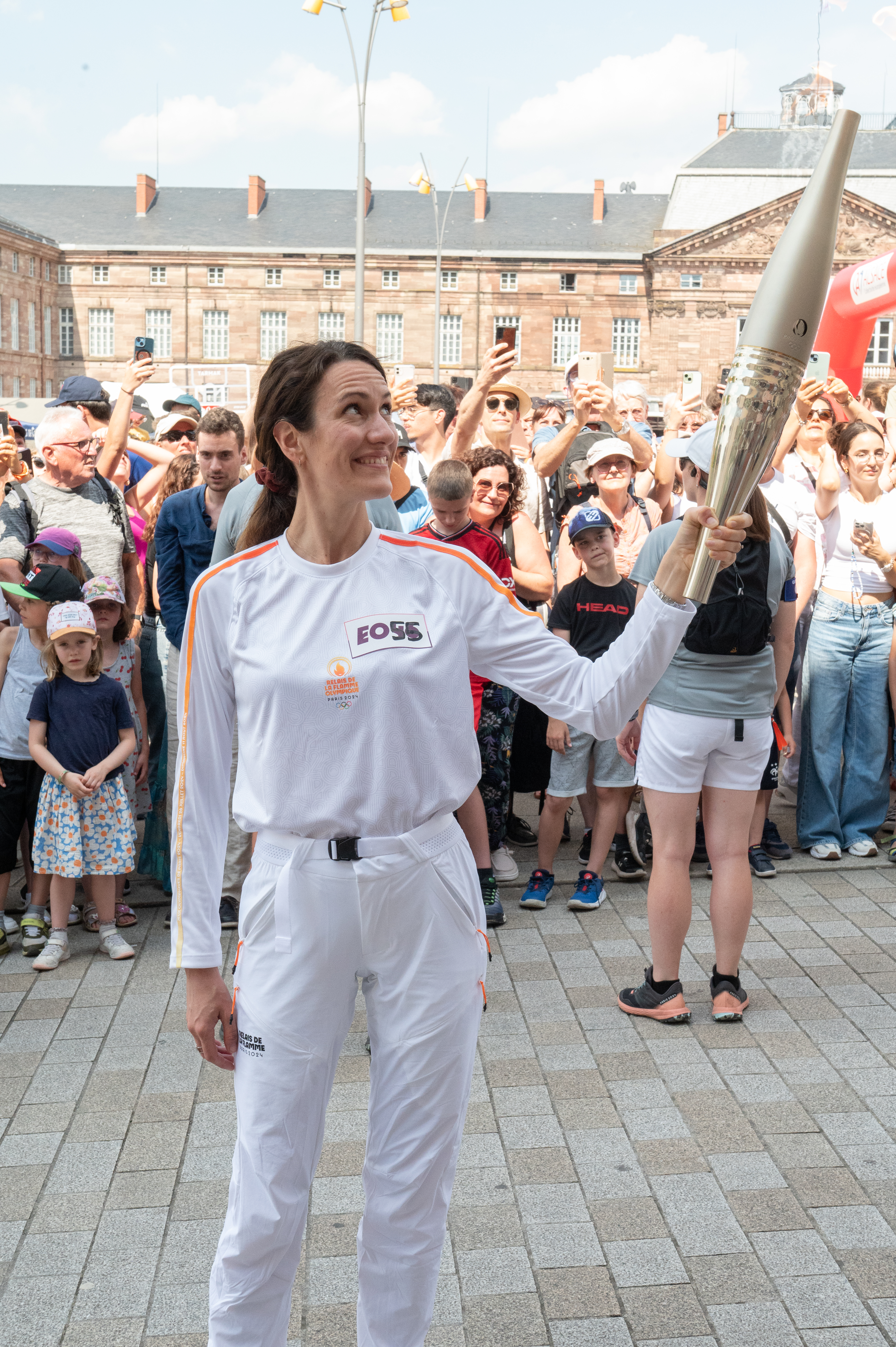

Personal information
- Born: 30 December 1986 (age 39) Strasbourg
- Height: 173 cm (5 ft 8 in) (2008)
- Weight: 57 kg (126 lb) (2008)

Sport
- Country: France
- Sport: Synchronized swimming
- Events: Solo, Duet, Team, Combination
- Club: Ballet Nautique Strasbourg
- Retired: 2010

Achievements and titles
- Olympic finals: 2008 Summer Olympics
- World finals: 2009 World Aquatics Championships

Apolline Dreyfuss (born 30 December 1986) is a French synchronized swimmer who competed in the 2008 Summer Olympics.

== Personal ==
Dreyfuss was born on 30 December 1986 in Strasbourg. Dreyfuss is 173 centimetres (5 ft 8 in) tall and weighs 57 kilograms (130 lb).

== Synchronized swimming ==
Dreyfuss is a synchronized swimmer, specialises in solo and duet events. She decided to retire in 2010 at the age of 23, to concentrate on her studies. As of 2010, she is student of the French business school ESCP Europe.

== Career records ==
Solo
2006, European Aquatics Championships, Budapest, 8th

Duet
2003, France National Championships, 2nd
2004, France National Championships, 1st
2006, European Aquatics Championships, Budapest, 8th
2008, Summer Olympics, Beijing, 11th (with Lila Meesseman-Bakir)
2009, World Aquatics Championships, Rome, 8th (with Lila Meesseman-Bakir)
2010, European Aquatics Championships, Budapest, 6th (with Chloé Willhelm)

Team
2006, European Aquatics Championships, Budapest, 6th
2009, World Aquatics Championships, Rome, 7th (free routine)
2009, World Aquatics Championships, Rome, 9th (technical routine)
2010, European Aquatics Championships, Budapest, 5th

Combination
2006, European Aquatics Championships, Budapest, 5th
2008, European Aquatics Championships, Eindhoven, 5th
