= Olga Shevchuk =

Ukrainian synchronised swimmer

Personal information
- Nationality: Ukrainian
- Born: 26 June 1990 (age 36) Kyiv, Ukrainian SSR, Soviet Union

Sport
- Sport: Swimming
- Strokes: Synchronised swimming
Medal record
Women's synchronised swimming
Representing Ukraine
Event	1st	2nd	3rd
European Championships	0	0	1
European Junior Championships	0	0	2
Total	0	0	3
European Championships
Bronze medal – third place	2008 Eindhoven	Combination routine
European Junior Championships
Bronze medal – third place	2006 Bonn	Free routine combination
Bronze medal – third place	2007 Callela	Free routine combination

Olga Shevchuk (Ukrainian: Ольга Шевчук; born in 1990) is a retired Ukrainian synchronised swimmer.

== Early life and education ==
She was born on 26 June 1990 in Kyiv, Ukraine. She studied at the Olympic College named after Ivan Poddubny in Kyiv.

== Career ==
In 2006, Olga Shevchuk won a bronze medal in free routine combination event at the 2006 European Junior Synchronised Swimming Championships, held in Bonn. At the next European junior championships, held in Callela she won a bronze medal in free combination routine event.

She competed at the 2007 World Aquatics Championships and 2009 World Aquatics Championships without reaching any medals.

The following years, Olga competed at the 2008 European Aquatics Championships, held in Eindhoven, where she received a bronze medal in free routine combination event.

== Personal life ==
Now she is a coach of fitness club "Podolsky Club" in Kyiv, a co-owner of professional swimming school "United Swim", a participant of ProFit conventions and instructor of aquaaerobics.
