= Alena Alekseeva =

Russian swimmer

Personal information
- Full name: Alena Alekseeva
- Nationality: Russia
- Born: 6 March 1989 (age 37) Novosibirsk, Russian SFSR, Soviet Union
- Height: 1.68 m (5 ft 6 in)
- Weight: 58 kg (128 lb)

Sport
- Sport: Swimming
- Strokes: Breaststroke
Medal record
Women's swimming
Representing Russia
European Championships (LC)
Silver medal – second place	2008 Eindhoven	100 m breaststroke
Bronze medal – third place	2008 Eindhoven	200 m breaststroke
European Championships (SC)
Gold medal – first place	2008 Rijeka	200 m breaststroke

Alena Alekseeva (born 6 March 1989) is a Russian breaststroke swimmer from Novosibirsk.
