= 2016 FINA Swimming World Cup =

Swimming competition

The 2016 FINA Swimming World Cup was a series of nine two-day meets in nine cities between August and October 2016. After switching to long-course (50-meter) pools in the previous year's pre-Olympic season, this edition returned to the usual short-course (25-meter pool) format. Like the previous short course World Cup in 2014, 36 events were scheduled. The total amount of prize money was US$ 2,178,000. The first meet started 13 days after the final day of the Olympic pool swimming program.

== Meets ==
The 2016 World Cup consisted of the following nine meets, which were divided into three clusters. Berlin returned after having been omitted for the previous two editions. The other eight cities were the same as the previous year.

| Cluster | Meet | Dates | Location | Venue |
|---|---|---|---|---|
| Europe | 1 | August 26–27 | Paris-Chartres, France | L'Odyssée (in French) |
| Europe | 2 | August 30–31 | Berlin, Germany | SSE (in German) |
| Europe | 3 | September 3–4 | Moscow, Russia | Olimpiysky Sports Complex |
| Asia 1 | 4 | September 30–October 1 | Beijing, China | Beijing National Aquatics Center |
| Asia 1 | 5 | October 4–5 | Dubai, United Arab Emirates | Hamdan Sports Complex |
| Asia 1 | 6 | October 8–9 | Doha, Qatar | Hamad Aquatic Centre |
| Asia 2 | 7 | October 21–22 | Singapore | OCBC Aquatic Centre |
| Asia 2 | 8 | October 25–26 | Tokyo, Japan | Tokyo Tatsumi International Swimming Center |
| Asia 2 | 9 | October 29–30 | Hong Kong | Victoria Park Swimming Pool |

== World Cup standings ==
- Composition of points:
  - Best performances (by meets): 1st place: 24 points, 2nd place: 18 points and 3rd place: 12 points;
  - Points for medals (in individual events): gold medal: 12 points, silver medal: 9 points and bronze medal: 6 points;
  - Bonus for world record (WR): 20 points.

=== Men ===
Overall top 10:

| Rank | Name | Nationality | Points awarded (Bonus) | | | | | | | | | Total |
| Rank | Name | Nationality | FRA | GER | RUS | CHN | UAE | QAT | SIN | JPN | HKG | Total |
|---|---|---|---|---|---|---|---|---|---|---|---|---|
| 1 | Vladimir Morozov | Russia | 86 | 86 | 54 | 81 | 81 | 48 | 78 | 69 | 57 | 640 |
| 2 | Chad le Clos | South Africa | 60 | 63 | 69 | 54 | 63 | 78 | 42 | 33 | 54 | 516 |
| 3 | Daiya Seto | Japan | – | – | – | 36 | 60 | 75 | 51 | 60 | 48 | 330 |
| 4 | Philip Heintz | Germany | 54 | 48 | 36 | 30 | 33 | 33 | 18 | 15 | 6 | 273 |
| 5 | Pavel Sankovich | Belarus | 21 | 18 | 27 | 27 | 33 | 33 | 27 | 15 | 30 | 231 |
| 6 | Robert Hurley | Australia | 27 | 33 | 39 | 30 | 45 | 39 | – | – | – | 213 |
| 7 | Marco Koch | Germany | 0 | 39 | 30 | 12 | 12 | 24 | 36 | 30 | 21 | 204 |
| 9 | Mitch Larkin | Australia | 27 | 18 | 33 | – | – | – | 30 | 21 | 27 | 156 |
| 8 | Felipe Lima | Brazil | 6 | 6 | 15 | 21 | 21 | 21 | 21 | 21 | 24 | 156 |
| 10 | James Guy | Great Britain | 18 | 24 | 24 | – | 15 | 18 | 9 | – | 15 | 123 |

=== Women ===
Overall top 10:

| Rank | Name | Nationality | Points awarded (Bonus) | | | | | | | | | Total |
| Rank | Name | Nationality | FRA | GER | RUS | CHN | UAE | QAT | SIN | JPN | HKG | Total |
|---|---|---|---|---|---|---|---|---|---|---|---|---|
| 1 | Katinka Hosszú | Hungary | 129 | 129 | 120 | 177 | 144 | 144 | 138 | 138 | 138 | 1197 |
| 2 | Alia Atkinson | Jamaica | 76 | 45 | – | 54 | 60 | 54 | 54 | 74 | 63 | 480 |
| 3 | Jeanette Ottesen | Denmark | 45 | 48 | 48 | 60 | 48 | 60 | 45 | 45 | 42 | 441 |
| 4 | Yuliya Yefimova | Russia | 24 | 30 | 66 | 24 | 30 | 36 | 51 | 45 | 54 | 360 |
| 5 | Daryna Zevina | Ukraine | 45 | 24 | 51 | 21 | 48 | 30 | 21 | 12 | 18 | 270 |
| 6 | Zsuzsanna Jakabos | Hungary | 18 | 24 | 36 | 18 | 39 | 39 | 33 | 12 | 30 | 249 |
| 7 | Emily Seebohm | Australia | 33 | 30 | 42 | – | – | – | 51 | 33 | 48 | 237 |
| 8 | Katie Meili | United States | 21 | 45 | 45 | 24 | 24 | 27 | – | – | – | 186 |
| 9 | Madeline Groves | Australia | 27 | 45 | – | 6 | 21 | 39 | 0 | 9 | 9 | 156 |
| 10 | Rie Kaneto | Japan | 12 | 12 | 15 | 36 | 30 | 30 | – | 12 | – | 147 |

== Event winners ==
=== 50 m freestyle ===
| Meet | Men | | | Women | | |
| Meet | Winner | Nationality | Time | Winner | Nationality | Time |
|---|---|---|---|---|---|---|
| Chartres-Paris | Vladimir Morozov | Russia | 20.81 | Jeanette Ottesen | Denmark | 23.72 |
| Berlin | Vladimir Morozov | Russia | 20.79 | Jeanette Ottesen | Denmark | 23.58 |
| Moscow | Vladimir Morozov | Russia | 20.98 | Jeanette Ottesen | Denmark | 23.95 |
| Beijing | Vladimir Morozov | Russia | 21.06 | Zhu Menghui; Jeanette Ottesen | China; Denmark | 24.00 WJR; 24.00 |
| Dubai | Vladimir Morozov | Russia | 20.88 | Jeanette Ottesen | Denmark | 24.12 |
| Doha | Vladimir Morozov | Russia | 21.05 | Jeanette Ottesen | Denmark | 23.84 |
| Singapore | Vladimir Morozov | Russia | 20.86 | Jeanette Ottesen | Denmark | 24.07 |
| Tokyo | Vladimir Morozov | Russia | 20.73 | Jeanette Ottesen | Denmark | 23.80 |
| Hong Kong | Vladimir Morozov | Russia | 21.16 | Jeanette Ottesen | Denmark | 23.95 |

=== 100 m freestyle ===
| Meet | Men | | | Women | | |
| Meet | Winner | Nationality | Time | Winner | Nationality | Time |
|---|---|---|---|---|---|---|
| Chartres-Paris | Vladimir Morozov | Russia | 45.57 | Jeanette Ottesen | Denmark | 51.84 |
| Berlin | Vladimir Morozov | Russia | 45.79 | Jeanette Ottesen | Denmark | 51.87 |
| Moscow | Vladimir Morozov | Russia | 46.36 | Jeanette Ottesen | Denmark | 51.75 |
| Beijing | Vladimir Morozov | Russia | 45.99 | Jeanette Ottesen | Denmark | 51.93 |
| Dubai | Vladimir Morozov | Russia | 46.71 | Jeanette Ottesen | Denmark | 51.77 |
| Doha | Vladimir Morozov | Russia | 45.77 | Jeanette Ottesen | Denmark | 51.58 |
| Singapore | Vladimir Morozov | Russia | 45.92 | Jeanette Ottesen | Denmark | 51.97 |
| Tokyo | Kyle Chalmers | Australia | 46.12 WJR | Jeanette Ottesen | Denmark | 51.94 |
| Hong Kong | Shinri Shioura | Japan | 47.15 | Jeanette Ottesen | Denmark | 52.46 |

=== 200 m freestyle ===
| Meet | Men | | | Women | | |
| Meet | Winner | Nationality | Time | Winner | Nationality | Time |
|---|---|---|---|---|---|---|
| Chartres-Paris | Philip Heintz | Germany | 1:43.13 | Katinka Hosszú | Hungary | 1:53.34 |
| Berlin | James Guy | Great Britain | 1:42.22 | Katinka Hosszú | Hungary | 1:52.08 |
| Moscow | James Guy | Great Britain | 1:43.77 | Katinka Hosszú | Hungary | 1:54.40 |
| Beijing | Myles Brown | South Africa | 1:43.60 | Katinka Hosszú | Hungary | 1:53.89 |
| Dubai | Myles Brown | South Africa | 1:43.11 | Katinka Hosszú | Hungary | 1:54.37 |
| Doha | Chad le Clos | South Africa | 1:42.84 | Katinka Hosszú | Hungary | 1:53.29 |
| Singapore | Kyle Chalmers | Australia | 1:42.67 | Katinka Hosszú | Hungary | 1:53.17 |
| Tokyo | Kyle Chalmers | Australia | 1:42.42 | Katinka Hosszú | Hungary | 1:53.34 |
| Hong Kong | Pieter Timmers | Belgium | 1:44.57 | Katinka Hosszú | Hungary | 1:53.98 |

=== 400 m freestyle ===
| Meet | Men | | | Women | | |
| Meet | Winner | Nationality | Time | Winner | Nationality | Time |
|---|---|---|---|---|---|---|
| Chartres-Paris | Jordan Pothain | France | 3:40.56 | Katinka Hosszú | Hungary | 4:02.83 |
| Berlin | James Guy | Great Britain | 3:39.20 | Katinka Hosszú | Hungary | 4:02.11 |
| Moscow | James Guy | Great Britain | 3:40.70 | Katinka Hosszú | Hungary | 4:01.20 |
| Beijing | Myles Brown | South Africa | 3:40.38 | Katinka Hosszú | Hungary | 4:01.65 |
| Dubai | Robert Hurley | Australia | 3:41.94 | Katinka Hosszú | Hungary | 4:03.14 |
| Doha | Myles Brown | South Africa | 3:39.78 | Katinka Hosszú | Hungary | 4:03.94 |
| Singapore | Mykhailo Romanchuk | Ukraine | 3:40.64 | Katinka Hosszú | Hungary | 4:01.18 |
| Tokyo | Mykhailo Romanchuk | Ukraine | 3:39.67 | Boglárka Kapás | Hungary | 3:59.15 |
| Hong Kong | Mykhailo Romanchuk | Ukraine | 3:40.18 | Katinka Hosszú | Hungary | 4:05.31 |

=== 1500 m (men)/800 m (women) freestyle ===
| Meet | Men (1500 m) | | | Women (800 m) | | |
| Meet | Winner | Nationality | Time | Winner | Nationality | Time |
|---|---|---|---|---|---|---|
| Chartres-Paris | Jan Micka | Czech Republic | 14:56.21 | Franziska Hentke | Germany | 8:24.66 |
| Berlin | Florian Wellbrock | Germany | 14:35.79 | Franziska Hentke | Germany | 8:22.83 |
| Moscow | Poul Zellmann | Germany | 14:59.78 | Katinka Hosszú | Hungary | 8:26.24 |
| Beijing | Qiu Ziao | China | 14:35.45 | Hou Yawen | China | 8:16.81 |
| Dubai | Myles Brown | South Africa | 14:46.49 | Katinka Hosszú | Hungary | 8:27.45 |
| Doha | Gergely Gyurta | Hungary | 14:32.69 | Katinka Hosszú | Hungary | 8:27.58 |
| Singapore | Mykhailo Romanchuk | Ukraine | 14:15.49 WC | Boglárka Kapás | Hungary | 8:17.54 |
| Tokyo | Mykhailo Romanchuk | Ukraine | 14:26.39 | Boglárka Kapás | Hungary | 8:12.79 |
| Hong Kong | Mykhailo Romanchuk | Ukraine | 14:18.53 | Katinka Hosszú | Hungary | 8:21.09 |

=== 50 m backstroke ===
| Meet | Men | | | Women | | |
| Meet | Winner | Nationality | Time | Winner | Nationality | Time |
|---|---|---|---|---|---|---|
| Chartres-Paris | Jérémy Stravius | France | 22.85 | Emily Seebohm | Australia | 26.15 |
| Berlin | Pavel Sankovich | Belarus | 23.14 | Emily Seebohm | Australia | 26.38 |
| Moscow | Pavel Sankovich | Belarus | 23.13 | Daryna Zevina | Ukraine | 26.25 |
| Beijing | Pavel Sankovich | Belarus | 23.18 | Katinka Hosszú | Hungary | 26.68 |
| Dubai | Robert Hurley | Australia | 23.33 | Katinka Hosszú | Hungary | 26.35 |
| Doha | Pavel Sankovich | Belarus | 23.05 | Katinka Hosszú | Hungary | 26.38 |
| Singapore | Pavel Sankovich | Belarus | 23.01 | Emily Seebohm | Australia | 26.18 |
| Tokyo | Junya Koga | Japan | 23.17 | Katinka Hosszú | Hungary | 26.23 |
| Hong Kong | Pavel Sankovich | Belarus | 23.02 | Katinka Hosszú | Hungary | 26.40 |

=== 100 m backstroke ===
| Meet | Men | | | Women | | |
| Meet | Winner | Nationality | Time | Winner | Nationality | Time |
|---|---|---|---|---|---|---|
| Chartres-Paris | Robert Hurley | Australia | 50.51 | Katinka Hosszú | Hungary | 55.93 |
| Berlin | Stanislav Donets | Russia | 50.06 | Katinka Hosszú | Hungary | 55.60 |
| Moscow | Mitch Larkin | Australia | 49.62 | Katinka Hosszú | Hungary | 56.08 |
| Beijing | Xu Jiayu | China | 50.22 | Katinka Hosszú | Hungary | 56.56 |
| Dubai | Pavel Sankovich | Belarus | 50.20 | Katinka Hosszú | Hungary | 56.56 |
| Doha | Robert Hurley | Australia | 50.20 | Katinka Hosszú | Hungary | 56.44 |
| Singapore | Mitch Larkin | Australia | 50.25 | Katinka Hosszú | Hungary | 55.80 |
| Tokyo | Mitch Larkin | Australia | 50.23 | Katinka Hosszú | Hungary | 55.59 |
| Hong Kong | Stanislav Donets | Russia | 50.46 | Katinka Hosszú | Hungary | 56.30 |

=== 200 m backstroke ===
| Meet | Men | | | Women | | |
| Meet | Winner | Nationality | Time | Winner | Nationality | Time |
|---|---|---|---|---|---|---|
| Chartres-Paris | Mitch Larkin | Australia | 1:50.10 | Daryna Zevina | Ukraine | 1:59.35 WC |
| Berlin | Mitch Larkin | Australia | 1:48.81 | Katinka Hosszú | Hungary | 2:00.52 |
| Moscow | Mitch Larkin | Australia | 1:48.31 | Daryna Zevina | Ukraine | 2:00.47 |
| Beijing | Xu Jiayu | China | 1:51.50 | Daryna Zevina | Ukraine | 2:01.61 |
| Dubai | Robert Hurley | Australia | 1:52.53 | Daryna Zevina | Ukraine | 2:00.97 |
| Doha | Robert Hurley | Australia | 1:51.70 | Daryna Zevina | Ukraine | 2:01.25 |
| Singapore | Mitch Larkin | Australia | 1:50.22 | Katinka Hosszú | Hungary | 2:01.66 |
| Tokyo | Masaki Kaneko | Japan | 1:49.89 | Katinka Hosszú | Hungary | 2:01.72 |
| Hong Kong | Mitch Larkin | Australia | 1:50.33 | Katinka Hosszú | Hungary | 2:02.28 |

=== 50 m breaststroke ===
| Meet | Men | | | Women | | |
| Meet | Winner | Nationality | Time | Winner | Nationality | Time |
|---|---|---|---|---|---|---|
| Chartres-Paris | Cameron van der Burgh | South Africa | 25.98 | Alia Atkinson | Jamaica | 29.25 |
| Berlin | Cameron van der Burgh | South Africa | 25.75 | Alia Atkinson | Jamaica | 29.00 |
| Moscow | Cameron van der Burgh | South Africa | 25.88 | Yuliya Yefimova | Russia | 29.19 |
| Beijing | Felipe Lima | Brazil | 26.10 | Alia Atkinson | Jamaica | 29.15 |
| Dubai | Felipe Lima | Brazil | 26.02 | Alia Atkinson | Jamaica | 29.02 |
| Doha | Felipe Lima | Brazil | 26.14 | Alia Atkinson | Jamaica | 28.98 |
| Singapore | Felipe Lima | Brazil | 26.19 | Alia Atkinson | Jamaica | 28.91 |
| Tokyo | Felipe Lima | Brazil | 26.25 | Alia Atkinson | Jamaica | 28.64 WR |
| Hong Kong | Felipe Lima | Brazil | 26.32 | Alia Atkinson | Jamaica | 29.20 |

=== 100 m breaststroke ===
| Meet | Men | | | Women | | |
| Meet | Winner | Nationality | Time | Winner | Nationality | Time |
|---|---|---|---|---|---|---|
| Chartres-Paris | Cameron van der Burgh | South Africa | 56.42 | Alia Atkinson | Jamaica | 1:02.36 =WR |
| Berlin | Cameron van der Burgh | South Africa | 56.56 | Katie Meili | United States | 1:02.92 |
| Moscow | Cameron van der Burgh | South Africa | 56.64 | Yuliya Yefimova | Russia | 1:02.91 |
| Beijing | Vladimir Morozov | Russia | 56.33 | Alia Atkinson | Jamaica | 1:03.42 |
| Dubai | Vladimir Morozov | Russia | 56.52 | Katie Meili | United States | 1:03.26 |
| Doha | Vladimir Morozov | Russia | 56.97 | Alia Atkinson | Jamaica | 1:03.18 |
| Singapore | Vladimir Morozov | Russia | 56.80 | Alia Atkinson | Jamaica | 1:02.40 |
| Tokyo | Vladimir Morozov | Russia | 56.80 | Alia Atkinson | Jamaica | 1:02.91 |
| Hong Kong | Felipe Lima | Brazil | 57.32 | Alia Atkinson | Jamaica | 1:02.68 |

=== 200 m breaststroke ===
| Meet | Men | | | Women | | |
| Meet | Winner | Nationality | Time | Winner | Nationality | Time |
|---|---|---|---|---|---|---|
| Chartres-Paris | Cameron van der Burgh | South Africa | 2:05.12 | Rie Kaneto | Japan | 2:16.99 |
| Berlin | Marco Koch | Germany | 2:01.92 | Rie Kaneto | Japan | 2:16.27 |
| Moscow | Marco Koch | Germany | 2:01.94 | Yuliya Yefimova | Russia | 2:16.54 |
| Beijing | Marco Koch | Germany | 2:03.21 | Rie Kaneto | Japan | 2:15.91 |
| Dubai | Marco Koch | Germany | 2:03.41 | Rie Kaneto | Japan | 2:16.30 |
| Doha | Marco Koch | Germany | 2:02.13 | Rie Kaneto | Japan | 2:15.76 |
| Singapore | Marco Koch | Germany | 2:01.41 | Breeja Larson | United States | 2:18.95 |
| Tokyo | Marco Koch | Germany | 2:01.43 | Rie Kaneto | Japan | 2:16.75 |
| Hong Kong | Marco Koch | Germany | 2:02.31 | Yuliya Yefimova | Russia | 2:16.49 |

=== 50 m butterfly ===
| Meet | Men | | | Women | | |
| Meet | Winner | Nationality | Time | Winner | Nationality | Time |
|---|---|---|---|---|---|---|
| Chartres-Paris | Chad le Clos | South Africa | 22.17 | Jeanette Ottesen | Denmark | 25.09 |
| Berlin | Chad le Clos | South Africa | 22.15 | Jeanette Ottesen | Denmark | 24.95 |
| Moscow | Chad le Clos | South Africa | 22.06 | Jeanette Ottesen | Denmark | 25.02 |
| Beijing | Chad le Clos | South Africa | 22.14 | Jeanette Ottesen | Denmark | 25.16 |
| Dubai | Chad le Clos | South Africa | 22.08 | Jeanette Ottesen | Denmark | 25.16 |
| Doha | Chad le Clos | South Africa | 22.36 | Jeanette Ottesen | Denmark | 25.13 |
| Singapore | Chad le Clos | South Africa | 22.33 | Jeanette Ottesen | Denmark | 25.11 |
| Tokyo | Chad le Clos | South Africa | 22.30 | Jeanette Ottesen | Denmark | 25.05 |
| Hong Kong | Chad le Clos | South Africa | 22.31 | Jeanette Ottesen | Denmark | 25.65 |

=== 100 m butterfly ===
| Meet | Men | | | Women | | |
| Meet | Winner | Nationality | Time | Winner | Nationality | Time |
|---|---|---|---|---|---|---|
| Chartres-Paris | Chad le Clos | South Africa | 49.05 | Katinka Hosszú | Hungary | 56.09 |
| Berlin | Chad le Clos | South Africa | 48.66 | Jeanette Ottesen | Denmark | 55.86 |
| Moscow | Chad le Clos | South Africa | 49.01 | Jeanette Ottesen | Denmark | 55.80 |
| Beijing | Chad le Clos | South Africa | 49.35 | Jeanette Ottesen | Denmark | 56.37 |
| Dubai | Chad le Clos | South Africa | 49.14 | Jeanette Ottesen | Denmark | 56.11 |
| Doha | Chad le Clos | South Africa | 50.23 | Jeanette Ottesen | Denmark | 55.93 |
| Singapore | Chad le Clos | South Africa | 49.26 | Katinka Hosszú | Hungary | 56.02 |
| Tokyo | Chad le Clos | South Africa | 49.45 | Kelsi Worrell | United States | 55.84 |
| Hong Kong | Chad le Clos | South Africa | 49.52 | Kelsi Worrell | United States | 55.49 |

=== 200 m butterfly ===
| Meet | Men | | | Women | | |
| Meet | Winner | Nationality | Time | Winner | Nationality | Time |
|---|---|---|---|---|---|---|
| Chartres-Paris | Chad le Clos | South Africa | 1:51.25 | Franziska Hentke | Germany | 2:05.16 |
| Berlin | Chad le Clos | South Africa | 1:49.33 | Franziska Hentke | Germany | 2:04.06 |
| Moscow | Chad le Clos | South Africa | 1:49.10 | Zsuzsanna Jakabos | Hungary | 2:06.44 |
| Beijing | Chad le Clos | South Africa | 1:49.82 | Liu Siyu | China | 2:05.44 |
| Dubai | Chad le Clos | South Africa | 1:49.71 | Katinka Hosszú | Hungary | 2:05.62 |
| Doha | Daiya Seto | Japan | 1:49.84 | Katinka Hosszú; Madeline Groves | Hungary; Australia | 2:03.34 |
| Singapore | Daiya Seto | Japan | 1:49.53 | Katinka Hosszú | Hungary | 2:05.95 |
| Tokyo | Daiya Seto | Japan | 1:49.93 | Katinka Hosszú | Hungary | 2:03.92 |
| Hong Kong | Chad le Clos | South Africa | 1:49.95 | Katinka Hosszú | Hungary | 2:06.09 |

=== 100 m individual medley ===
| Meet | Men | | | Women | | |
| Meet | Winner | Nationality | Time | Winner | Nationality | Time |
|---|---|---|---|---|---|---|
| Chartres-Paris | Vladimir Morozov | Russia | 50.60 WR | Katinka Hosszú | Hungary | 57.63 |
| Berlin | Vladimir Morozov | Russia | 50.30 WR | Katinka Hosszú | Hungary | 57.12 |
| Moscow | Vladimir Morozov | Russia | 51.03 | Katinka Hosszú | Hungary | 57.76 |
| Beijing | Vladimir Morozov | Russia | 51.06 | Katinka Hosszú | Hungary | 58.10 |
| Dubai | Vladimir Morozov | Russia | 51.05 | Katinka Hosszú | Hungary | 58.09 |
| Doha | Vladimir Morozov | Russia | 51.75 | Katinka Hosszú | Hungary | 57.82 |
| Singapore | Vladimir Morozov | Russia | 50.70 | Katinka Hosszú | Hungary | 58.45 |
| Tokyo | Vladimir Morozov | Russia | 50.55 | Katinka Hosszú | Hungary | 57.47 |
| Hong Kong | Vladimir Morozov | Russia | 50.33 | Katinka Hosszú | Hungary | 58.21 |

=== 200 m individual medley ===
| Meet | Men | | | Women | | |
| Meet | Winner | Nationality | Time | Winner | Nationality | Time |
|---|---|---|---|---|---|---|
| Chartres-Paris | Philip Heintz | Germany | 1:52.03 | Katinka Hosszú | Hungary | 2:06.64 |
| Berlin | Philip Heintz | Germany | 1:51.92 | Katinka Hosszú | Hungary | 2:05.57 |
| Moscow | Philip Heintz | Germany | 1:52.93 | Katinka Hosszú | Hungary | 2:05.60 |
| Beijing | Wang Shun | China | 1:51.63 | Katinka Hosszú | Hungary | 2:07.37 |
| Dubai | Daiya Seto | Japan | 1:52.41 | Katinka Hosszú | Hungary | 2:05.87 |
| Doha | Daiya Seto | Japan | 1:52.49 | Katinka Hosszú | Hungary | 2:05.77 |
| Singapore | Daiya Seto | Japan | 1:52.80 | Katinka Hosszú | Hungary | 2:06.25 |
| Tokyo | Daiya Seto | Japan | 1:52.48 | Katinka Hosszú | Hungary | 2:04.56 |
| Hong Kong | Daiya Seto | Japan | 1:53.09 | Katinka Hosszú | Hungary | 2:05.39 |

=== 400 m individual medley ===
| Meet | Men | | | Women | | |
| Meet | Winner | Nationality | Time | Winner | Nationality | Time |
|---|---|---|---|---|---|---|
| Chartres-Paris | Philip Heintz | Germany | 4:03.51 | Katinka Hosszú | Hungary | 4:27.67 |
| Berlin | Philip Heintz | Germany | 4:02.84 | Katinka Hosszú | Hungary | 4:25.69 |
| Moscow | Hiromasa Fujimori | Japan | 4:04.04 | Katinka Hosszú | Hungary | 4:28.32 |
| Beijing | Daiya Seto | Japan | 4:04.26 | Katinka Hosszú | Hungary | 4:33.60 |
| Dubai | Daiya Seto | Japan | 4:00.93 | Katinka Hosszú | Hungary | 4:33.84 |
| Doha | Daiya Seto | Japan | 4:02.39 | Katinka Hosszú | Hungary | 4:31.18 |
| Singapore | Daiya Seto | Japan | 4:04.60 | Katinka Hosszú | Hungary | 4:29.03 |
| Tokyo | Daiya Seto | Japan | 4:03.42 | Katinka Hosszú | Hungary | 4:28.46 |
| Hong Kong | Daiya Seto | Japan | 4:04.11 | Katinka Hosszú | Hungary | 4:28.50 |

=== 4 × 50 m mixed relays ===
| Meet | 4 × 50 m mixed freestyle | | | 4 × 50 m mixed medley | | |
| Meet | Winners | Nationality | Time | Winners | Nationality | Time |
|---|---|---|---|---|---|---|
| Chartres-Paris | Jérémy Stravius; Florent Manaudou; Mathilde Cini; Anna Santamans | France | 1:30.74 | Jérémy Stravius; Florent Manaudou; Marie Wattel; Anna Santamans | France | 1:39.46 |
| Berlin | Kirill Prigoda; Vladimir Morozov; Daria Ustinova; Yuliya Yefimova | Russia | 1:32.07 | Stanislav Donets; Yuliya Yefimova; Vladimir Morozov; Daria Ustinova | Russia | 1:39.77 |
| Moscow | Oleg Tikhobaev; Vladimir Morozov; Daria Ustinova; Daria Kartashova | Russia | 1:32.14 | Stanislav Donets; Yuliya Yefimova; Vladimir Morozov; Daria Ustinova | Russia | 1:39.67 |
| Beijing | Lin Yongqing; Yu Hexin; Liu Xiang; Zhu Menghui | China | 1:31.62 | Xu Jiayu; Shi Jinglin; Lu Ying; Yu Hexin | China | 1:40.12 |
| Dubai | Vladimir Morozov; Stanislav Donets; Yuliya Yefimova; Nataliya Lovtsova | Russia | 1:33.37 | Stanislav Donets; Yuliya Yefimova; Nataliya Lovtsova; Vladimir Morozov | Russia | 1:40.81 |
| Doha | Vladimir Morozov; Stanislav Donets; Yuliya Yefimova; Nataliya Lovtsova | Russia | 1:32.32 | Stanislav Donets; Yuliya Yefimova; Nataliya Lovtsova; Vladimir Morozov | Russia | 1:40.77 |
| Singapore | Kyle Chalmers; Andrew Abood; Madeline Groves; Madison Wilson | Australia | 1:31.04 | Stanislav Donets; Yuliya Yefimova; Vladimir Morozov; Daria Ustinova | Russia | 1:39.34 |
| Tokyo | Tommaso D'Orsogna; Brayden McCarthy; Carla Buchanan; Emily Seebohm | Australia | 1:31.49 | Stanislav Donets; Yuliya Yefimova; Vladimir Morozov; Daria Ustinova | Russia | 1:39.49 |
| Hong Kong | Vladimir Morozov; Stanislav Donets; Daria Ustinova; Yuliya Yefimova | Russia | 1:32.61 | Stanislav Donets; Yuliya Yefimova; Vladimir Morozov; Daria Ustinova | Russia | 1:39.82 |

Legend: WR – World record; WJR – World Junior record; WC – World Cup record
