= 2010 European Aquatics Championships =

Water sport competitions

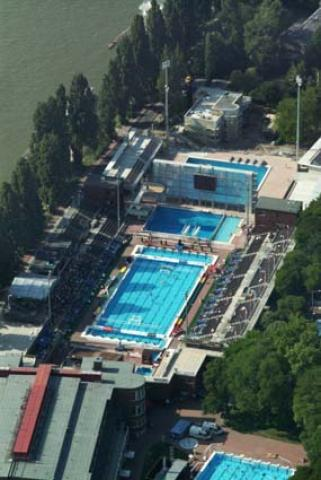
- Host city: Budapest and Balatonfüred, Hungary
- Date(s): 4–15 August 2010
- Venue(s): Alfréd Hajós Swimming Complex, Lake Balaton
- Nations participating: 43
- Athletes participating: 966
- Events: 61

The 2010 European Aquatics Championships were held from 4–15 August 2010 in Budapest and Balatonfüred, Hungary. It was the fourth time that the city of Budapest hosted this event after 1926, 1958 and 2006. Events in swimming, diving, synchronised swimming (synchro) and open water swimming were scheduled.

The 2010 European Water Polo Championships was held separately, from 29 August – 11 September in Zagreb, Croatia.

== Schedule ==
Competition dates by discipline were:

- Swimming: 9–15 August
- Diving: 10–15 August (exhibition competition on 9 August)
- Synchro: 4–8 August
- Open Water: 4–8 August (in Lake Balaton, based out of Balatonfüred)

== Medal table ==
* Host nation (Hungary)

Rank	Nation	Gold	Silver	Bronze	Total
1	Russia	13	7	8	28
2	Germany	8	9	3	20
3	France	8	8	7	23
4	Great Britain	6	6	7	19
5	Italy	6	5	6	17
6	Hungary*	6	4	4	14
7	Sweden	3	4	4	11
8	Ukraine	3	2	4	9
9	Denmark	2	2	2	6
10	Spain	1	4	4	9
11	Netherlands	1	2	4	7
12	Norway	1	2	0	3
13	Greece	1	1	3	5
14	Belarus	1	1	2	4
15	Poland	1	0	1	2
16	Austria	0	2	0	2
17	Faroe Islands	0	1	0	1
17	Ireland	0	1	0	1
17	Romania	0	1	0	1
20	Israel	0	0	2	2
Totals (20 entries)		61	62	61	184

== Swimming ==
=== Medal table ===
Rank	Nation	Gold	Silver	Bronze	Total
1	France	8	7	6	21
2	Russia	7	4	1	12
3	Great Britain	6	6	6	18
4	Hungary	6	4	3	13
5	Sweden	3	3	4	10
6	Germany	2	5	2	9
7	Denmark	2	2	2	6
8	Italy	2	0	4	6
9	Norway	1	2	0	3
10	Belarus	1	1	0	2
11	Spain	1	0	3	4
12	Poland	1	0	1	2
13	Netherlands	0	2	4	6
14	Austria	0	2	0	2
15	Faroe Islands	0	1	0	1
15	Ireland	0	1	0	1
15	Romania	0	1	0	1
18	Israel	0	0	2	2
19	Greece	0	0	1	1
Totals (19 entries)		40	41	39	120

=== Results ===
==== Men's events ====
Event	Gold		Silver		Bronze	
50 m freestyle	Frédérick Bousquet; France	21.49	Stefan Nystrand; Sweden	21.69	Fabien Gilot; France	21.76
100 m freestyle	Alain Bernard; France	48.49	Yevgeny Lagunov; Russia	48.52	William Meynard; France	48.56
200 m freestyle	Paul Biedermann; Germany	1:46.06	Nikita Lobintsev; Russia	1:46.51	Sebastiaan Verschuren; Netherlands	1:46.91
400 m freestyle	Yannick Agnel; France	3:46.17	Paul Biedermann; Germany	3:46.30	Gergő Kis; Hungary	3:48.14
800 metre freestyle	Sébastien Rouault; France	7:48.28 CR	Christian Kubusch; Germany	7:49.12	Samuel Pizzetti; Italy	7:49.94
1500 m freestyle	Sébastien Rouault; France	14:55.17	Pál Joensen; Faroe Islands	14:56.90	Samuel Pizzetti; Italy	14:59.76
50 m backstroke	Camille Lacourt; France	24.07 CR, NR	Liam Tancock; Great Britain	24.70	Guy Barnea; Israel	25.04
100 m backstroke	Camille Lacourt; France	52.11 ER	Jérémy Stravius; France	53.44	Liam Tancock; Great Britain	53.86
200 m backstroke	Stanislav Donets; Russia	1:57.18	Markus Rogan; Austria	1:57.31	Benjamin Stasiulis; France	1:57.37
50 m breaststroke	Fabio Scozzoli; Italy	27.38	Dragos Agache; Romania	27.47 NR	Lennart Stekelenburg; Netherlands	27.51
100 m breaststroke	Alexander Dale Oen; Norway	59.20 CR	Hugues Duboscq; France	1:00.15	Fabio Scozzoli; Italy	1:00.41
200 m breaststroke	Dániel Gyurta; Hungary	2:08.95 CR	Alexander Dale Oen; Norway	2:09.68	Hugues Duboscq; France	2:11.03
50 m butterfly	Rafael Muñoz; Spain	23.17	Frédérick Bousquet; France	23.41	Yevgeny Korotyshkin; Russia	23.43
100 m butterfly	Yevgeny Korotyshkin; Russia	51.73 CR	Joeri Verlinden; Netherlands	51.82	Konrad Czerniak; Poland	52.16
200 m butterfly	Paweł Korzeniowski; Poland	1:55.00	Nikolai Skvortsov; Russia	1:56.13	Ioannis Drymonakos; Greece	1:57.10
200 m individual medley	László Cseh; Hungary	1:57.73 CR	Markus Rogan; Austria	1:58.03	Joseph Roebuck; Great Britain	1:59.46
400 m individual medley	László Cseh; Hungary	4:10.95	Dávid Verrasztó; Hungary	4:12.96	Gal Nevo; Israel	4:15.10
4 × 100 m freestyle relay	Russia; Yevgeny Lagunov (48.23); Andrey Grechin (48.38); Nikita Lobintsev (47.98); Danila Izotov (47.87)	3:12.46 CR	France; Fabien Gilot (48.47); Yannick Agnel (48.23); William Meynard (47.89); Alain Bernard (48.70)	3:13.29	Sweden; Stefan Nystrand (49.24); Lars Frölander (48.34); Robin Andreasson (49.18); Jonas Persson (48.31)	3:15.07
4 × 200 m freestyle relay	Russia; Nikita Lobintsev (1:45.93); Danila Izotov (1:45.74); Sergey Perunin (1:47.98); Alexander Sukhorukov (1:47.06)	7:06.71 CR	Germany; Paul Biedermann (1:45.47); Tim Wallburger (1:47.55); Robin Backhaus (1:48.28); Clemens Rapp (1:46.83)	7:08.13	France; Yannick Agnel (1:45.83) NR; Clement Lefert (1:48.63); Antton Harambouré (1:49.80); Jérémy Stravius (1:45.44)	7:09.70 NR
4 × 100 m medley relay	France; Camille Lacourt (52.46); Hugues Duboscq (59.67); Frédérick Bousquet (51.84); Fabien Gilot (47.35)	3:31.32 CR	Russia; Stanislav Donets (54.19); Roman Sloudnov (59.97); Yevgeny Korotyshkin (51.27); Yevgeny Lagunov (47.86)	3:33.29	Netherlands; Nick Driebergen (54.48); Lennart Stekelenburg (1:00.79); Joeri Verlinden (51.40); Sebastiaan Verschuren (47.32)	3:33.99

==== Women's events ====
Event	Gold		Silver		Bronze	
50 m freestyle	Therese Alshammar; Sweden	24.45	Hinkelien Schreuder; Netherlands	24.66	Francesca Halsall; Great Britain	24.67
100 m freestyle	Francesca Halsall; Great Britain	53.58	Aleksandra Gerasimenya; Belarus	53.82	Femke Heemskerk; Netherlands	54.12
200 m freestyle	Federica Pellegrini; Italy	1:55.45 CR	Silke Lippok; Germany	1:56.98	Ágnes Mutina; Hungary	1:57.12
400 m freestyle	Rebecca Adlington; Great Britain	4:04.55	Ophélie-Cyrielle Étienne; France	4:05.40	Lotte Friis; Denmark	4:07.10
800 m freestyle	Lotte Friis; Denmark	8:23.27	Ophélie-Cyrielle Étienne; France	8:24.00	Federica Pellegrini; Italy	8:24.99
1500 m freestyle	Lotte Friis; Denmark	15:59.13	Gráinne Murphy; Ireland	16:02.29	Erika Villaécija García; Spain	16:05.08
50 m backstroke	Aleksandra Gerasimenya; Belarus	27.64 CR	Daniela Samulski; Germany	27.99	Mercedes Peris; Spain	28.01
100 m backstroke	Gemma Spofforth; Great Britain	59.80	Elizabeth Simmonds; Great Britain	1:00.19	Jenny Mensing; Germany	1:00.72
200 m backstroke	Elizabeth Simmonds; Great Britain	2:07.04	Gemma Spofforth; Great Britain	2:08.25	Duane da Rocha Marce; Spain	2:10.46
50 m breaststroke	Yuliya Yefimova; Russia	30.29 CR	Kate Haywood; Great Britain	31.12	Jennie Johansson; Sweden	31.24
100 m breaststroke	Yuliya Yefimova; Russia	1:06.32 CR	Rikke Møller Pedersen; Denmark; Jennie Johansson; Sweden	1:07.36		
200 m breaststroke	Anastasia Chaun; Russia	2:23.50 CR, NR	Sara Nordenstam; Norway	2:24.42	Rikke Møller Pedersen; Denmark	2:24.99
50 m butterfly	Therese Alshammar; Sweden	25.63	Jeanette Ottesen; Denmark	25.69	Mélanie Henique; France	26.09
100 m butterfly	Sarah Sjöström; Sweden	57.32	Francesca Halsall; Great Britain	57.40	Therese Alshammar; Sweden	57.80
200 m butterfly	Katinka Hosszú; Hungary	2:06.71	Zsuzsanna Jakabos; Hungary	2:07.06	Ellen Gandy; Great Britain	2:07.54
200 m individual medley	Katinka Hosszú; Hungary	2:10.09 CR	Evelyn Verrasztó; Hungary	2:10.10	Hannah Miley; Great Britain	2:10.89
400 m individual medley	Hannah Miley; Great Britain	4:33.09 CR	Katinka Hosszú; Hungary	4:36.43	Zsuzsanna Jakabos; Hungary	4:37.92
4 × 100 m freestyle relay	Germany; Daniela Samulski (54.91); Silke Lippok (53.78); Lisa Vitting (55.06); Daniela Schreiber (53.97)	3:37.72	Great Britain; Amy Smith (54.48); Francesca Halsall (53.05); Jessica Sylvester (55.36); Joanne Jackson (55.68)	3:38.57	Sweden; Josefin Lillhage (55.01); Therese Alshammar (54.09); Sarah Sjöström (53.77); Gabriella Fagundez (55.94)	3:38.81
4 × 200 m freestyle relay	Hungary; Ágnes Mutina (1:57.27); Eszter Dara (1:59.88); Katinka Hosszú (1:58.60); Evelyn Verrasztó (1:56.77)	7:52.49	France; Coralie Balmy (1:58.53); Ophelie-Cyrielle Etienne (1:57.21); Margaux Farrell (2:00.04); Camille Muffat (1:56.91)	7:52.69	Great Britain; Rebecca Adlington (2:00.09); Jazmin Carlin (1:57.85); Hannah Miley (1:58.90); Joanne Jackson (1:58.25)	7:55.29
4 × 100 m medley relay	Great Britain; Gemma Spofforth (1:00.39); Kate Haywood (1:07.50); Francesca Halsall (57.49); Amy Smith (54.37)	3:59.72	Sweden; Henriette Stenkvist (1:01.96); Joline Höstman (1:07.69); Therese Alshammar (57.80); Sarah Sjöström (53.73)	4:01.18	Germany; Jenny Mensing (1:01.76); Caroline Ruhnau (1:08.06); Daniela Samulski (59.26); Silke Lippok (54.14)	4:03.22

== Diving ==
=== Medal table ===
Rank	Nation	Gold	Silver	Bronze	Total
1	Germany	5	3	0	8
2	Ukraine	2	2	0	4
3	Italy	2	1	0	3
4	Russia	1	3	5	9
5	Sweden	0	1	0	1
6	Belarus	0	0	2	2
7	Great Britain	0	0	1	1
7	Hungary	0	0	1	1
7	Spain	0	0	1	1
Totals (9 entries)		10	10	10	30

=== Results ===
==== Men's events ====
Event	Gold		Silver		Bronze	
1 m springboard	Illya Kvasha; Ukraine	433.90	Patrick Hausding; Germany	430.25	Javier Illana; Spain	414.35
3 m springboard	Patrick Hausding; Germany	463.20	Ilya Zakharov; Russia	458.15	Yevgeni Kuznetsov; Russia	455.80
3 m springboard synchro	Illya Kvasha; Oleksiy Prygorov; Ukraine	431.67	Stephan Feck; Patrick Hausding; Germany	427.95	Dmitri Sautin; Yuriy Kunakov; Russia	410.43
10 m platform	Sascha Klein; Germany	534.85	Patrick Hausding; Germany	516.45	Vadim Kaptur; Belarus	515.80
10 m platform synchro	Sascha Klein; Patrick Hausding; Germany	478.11	Victor Minibaev; Ilya Zakharov; Russia	466.95	Timofei Hordeichik; Vadim Kaptur; Belarus	426.03

==== Women's events ====
Event	Gold		Silver		Bronze	
1 m springboard	Tania Cagnotto; Italy	299.70	Anna Lindberg; Sweden	293.70	Anastasia Pozdniakova; Russia	282.65
3 m springboard	Nadezhda Bazhina; Russia	324.10	Anastasia Pozdniakova; Russia	316.40	Nóra Barta; Hungary	291.75
3 m springboard synchro	Tania Cagnotto; Francesca Dallapè; Italy	327.90	Olena Fedorova; Hanna Pysmenska; Ukraine	312.00	Anastasia Pozdniakova; Svetlana Filippova; Russia	307.50
10 m platform	Christin Steuer; Germany	354.50	Noémi Bátki; Italy	343.80	Yulia Koltunova; Russia	340.45
10 m platform synchro	Christin Steuer; Nora Subschinski; Germany	319.68	Iulia Prokopchuk; Alina Chaplenko; Ukraine	306.30	Monique Gladding; Megan Sylvester; Great Britain	300.66

==== Team events ====
Event	Gold		Silver		Bronze	
Team event	Christin Steuer; Sascha Klein; Germany	398.15	Yulia Koltunova; Ilya Zakharov; Russia	396.35	Claire Febvay; Matthieu Rosset; France	381.00

This event was a test event and will not count towards the medal tables.

== Synchronised swimming ==
=== Medal table ===
Rank	Nation	Gold	Silver	Bronze	Total
1	Russia	4	0	0	4
2	Spain	0	4	0	4
3	Ukraine	0	0	4	4
Totals (3 entries)		4	4	4	12

=== Results ===
Event	Gold		Silver		Bronze	
Solo routine	Natalia Ishchenko; Russia	98.900	Andrea Fuentes; Spain	96.600	Lolita Ananasova; Ukraine	93.000
Duet routine	Natalia Ishchenko; Svetlana Romashina; Russia	98.700	Ona Carbonell; Andrea Fuentes; Spain	96.700	Daria Iushko; Kseniya Sydorenko; Ukraine	93.400
Team routine	Natalia Ishchenko; Elvira Khasyanova; Daria Korobova; Aleksandra Patskevich; Svetlana Romashina; Alla Shishkina; Angelika Timanina; Aleksandra Zueva; Russia	99.000	Clara Basiana; Alba María Cabello; Ona Carbonell; Margalida Crespí; Andrea Fuentes; Thaïs Henríquez; Paula Klamburg; Cristina Salvador; Spain	96.900	Lolita Ananasova; Inga Giller; Olena Grechykhina; Yuliya Maryanko; Oleksandra Sabada; Kateryna Sadurska; Kseniya Sydorenko; Anna Voloshyna; Ukraine	92.800
Combination routine	Anastasiya Yermakova; Natalia Ishchenko; Elvira Khasyanova; Daria Korobova; Olga Kuzhela; Aleksandra Patskevich; Svetlana Romashina; Alla Shishkina; Angelika Timanina; Aleksandra Zueva; Russia	98.300	Clara Basiana; Alba María Cabello; Ona Carbonell; Margalida Crespí; Andrea Fuentes; Thaïs Henríquez; Paula Klamburg; Irene Montrucchio; Irina Rodríguez; Cristina Salvador; Spain	97.000	Lolita Ananasova; Inga Giller; Olena Grechykhina; Daria Iushko; Olha Kondrashova; Yuliya Maryanko; Oleksandra Sabada; Kateryna Sadurska; Kseniya Sydorenko; Anna Voloshyna; Ukraine	94.100

== Open water swimming ==
=== Medal table ===
Rank	Nation	Gold	Silver	Bronze	Total
1	Italy	2	4	2	8
2	Greece	1	1	2	4
3	Germany	1	1	1	3
4	Russia	1	0	2	3
5	Netherlands	1	0	0	1
5	Ukraine	1	0	0	1
7	France	0	1	1	2
Totals (7 entries)		7	7	8	22

=== Results ===
==== Men's events ====
Event	Gold		Silver		Bronze	
5 km	Luca Ferretti; Italy	58:43.4	Simone Ercoli; Italy	59:00.5	Simone Ruffini; Italy; Spyridon Gianniotis; Greece	59:15.1
10 km	Thomas Lurz; Germany	1:54:22.5	Valerio Cleri; Italy	1:54:25.8	Evgeny Drattsev; Russia	1:54:26.6
25 km	Valerio Cleri; Italy	5:16:38.3	Bertrand Venturi; France	5:16:54.7	Joanes Hedel; France	5:18:57.6

==== Women's events ====
Event	Gold		Silver		Bronze	
5 km	Ekaterina Seliverstova; Russia	1:02:34.7	Kalliopi Araouzou; Greece	1:02:37.3	Marianna Lymperta; Greece	1:02:41.3
10 km	Linsy Heister; Netherlands	2:01:06.7	Giorgia Consiglio; Italy	2:01:07.6	Angela Maurer; Germany	2:01:08.2
25 km	Olga Beresnyeva; Ukraine	5:48:10.2	Angela Maurer; Germany	5:48:10.3	Martina Grimaldi; Italy	5:48:30.8

==== Mixed events ====
Event	Gold		Silver		Bronze	
5 km Team Event	Kalliopi Araouzou; Antonios Fokaidis; Spyridon Gianniotis; Greece	59:03	Rachele Bruni; Simone Ercoli; Simone Ruffini; Italy	59:55.6	Sergey Bolshakov; Anna Guseva; Daniil Serebrennikov; Russia	59:59.5

== See also ==
- LEN European Aquatics Championships
- List of European Championships records in swimming
- Ligue Européenne de Natation (LEN)
- 2010 in swimming
- 2009 World Aquatics Championships
- 2011 World Aquatics Championships
