= Lila Meesseman-Bakir =

French synchronized swimmer

Personal information
- Born: 13 March 1987 (age 39) Moissac
- Height: 162 cm (5 ft 4 in) (2008)
- Weight: 49 kg (108 lb) (2008)

Sport
- Country: France
- Sport: Synchronized swimming
- Events: Solo, Duet, Team, Combination
- Club: Pays d'Aix Natation
- Retired: 2010

Achievements and titles
- Olympic finals: 2008 Summer Olympics
- World finals: 2005, 2007 and 2009 World Aquatics Championships

Lila Meesseman-Bakir (born 13 March 1987) is a French synchronized swimmer who competed in the 2008 Summer Olympics.

== Personal ==
Meesseman-Bakir was born on 13 March 1987 in Moissac. She studied chemistry at Pierre-and-Marie-Curie University. In 2010, she studied management of sports organizations at INSEP. After her end of her sporting career, Meesseman-Bakir joined the popular aquatic show Le Rêve at the Wynn Las Vegas. In 2013, she joined the swimwear company JOG.

She is 162 centimetres (5 ft 4 in) tall and weighs 49 kilograms (110 lb).

== Synchronized swimming ==
Before synchronized swimming, Meesseman-Bakir practiced dance and gymnastics. She started synchronized swimming, at the age of eight years in the team of Dauphins de Montauban. In 2000, she moved to Pays d'Aix Natation and joined INSEP in Paris.

Her first international senior competition was for the 2005 World Aquatics Championships which took place in Montreal. She finished 11th with Salomé Lafay and finished 8th with her teammates Audrey Abadie, Caroline-Anne Berger, Apolline Dreyfuss, Salomé Lafay, Coralyne Lemaire, Coralie Mayaux and Nelsy Serrano.

In 2006, she finished 8th with Salomé Lafay at the 2006 European Aquatics Championships in Budapest and 6th with her teammates Assia Belaïd, Carole-Anne Berger, Joannie Ciociola, Apolline Dreyfuss, Tzvetomira Kostadinova, Coralyne Lemaire and Coralie Mayaux.

At the 2007 World Aquatics Championships in Melbourne, she competed in five events: duet technical routine, duet free routine, team technical routine, team free routine and combination.

In 2008, she finished 8th with Appoline Dreyfuss and 5th with the French team at the 2008 European Aquatics Championships in Eindhoven. The same year, she participated in the 2008 Summer Olympics in Beijing. Appoline Dreyfuss and her finished 11th.

The 2009 World Aquatics Championships in Rome was her last international competition. With Apolline Dreyfuss, she finished 8th.

Back injury forces her to retire in February 2010 at the age of 23.

== Career records ==
Solo
2004, France National Championships, 1st

Duet
2004, France National Championships, 2nd
2005, World Aquatics Championships, Montreal, 11th
2006, European Aquatics Championships, Budapest, 8th
2007, World Aquatics Championships, Melbourne, 12th and 15th
2008, European Aquatics Championships, Eindhoven, 8th
2008, Summer Olympics, Beijing, 11th (with Apolline Dreyfuss)
2009, World Aquatics Championships, Rome, 8th (with Apolline Dreyfuss)

Team
2003, France National Championships, 2nd
2004, France National Championships, 1st
2005, World Aquatics Championships, Montreal, 8th
2006, European Aquatics Championships, Budapest, 6th
2007, World Aquatics Championships, Melbourne, 11th and 12th

Combination
2006, European Aquatics Championships, Budapest, 5th
2007, World Aquatics Championships, Melbourne, 6th
2008, European Aquatics Championships, Eindhoven, 5th
