= 2008 European Aquatics Championships =

Water sport competitions

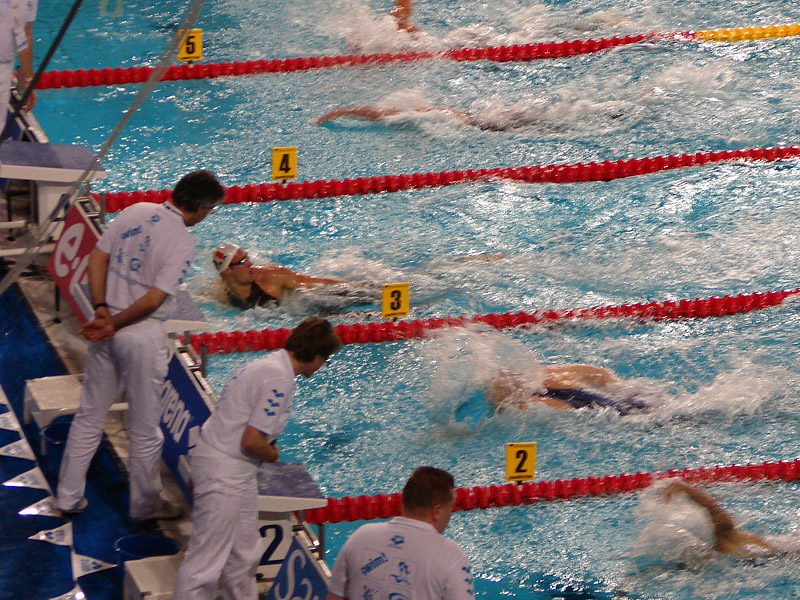
- Host city: (Netherlands) Eindhoven
- Date(s): 13–24 March 2008

The 2008 LEN European Aquatics Championships were held in Eindhoven, Netherlands, from 13–24 March 2008. They were the European championships for swimming (50 m), diving and synchronised swimming for 2008. Two new events were contested: the 800 m freestyle men and the 1500 m freestyle women. This is the first time that the men's and women's swimming programs are identical.

== Medal table ==
* Host nation (Netherlands)

Rank	Nation	Gold	Silver	Bronze	Total
1	Russia	12	7	6	25
2	Italy	5	7	9	21
3	France	5	4	3	12
4	Spain	5	3	4	12
5	Germany	4	4	1	9
6	Netherlands*	4	3	3	10
7	Hungary	3	4	2	9
8	Austria	3	2	2	7
9	Sweden	3	1	6	10
10	Ukraine	2	4	7	13
11	Great Britain	2	2	0	4
11	Greece	2	2	0	4
13	Norway	1	2	0	3
14	Slovenia	1	1	0	2
14	Switzerland	1	1	0	2
16	Serbia	1	0	0	1
17	Croatia	0	2	1	3
17	Finland	0	2	1	3
19	Romania	0	1	4	5
20	Belarus	0	1	1	2
20	Poland	0	1	1	2
22	Denmark	0	0	1	1
22	Lithuania	0	0	1	1
22	Slovakia	0	0	1	1
Totals (24 entries)		54	54	54	162

== Swimming ==
=== Medal table ===
Rank	Nation	Gold	Silver	Bronze	Total
1	Russia	8	7	4	19
2	France	5	4	4	13
3	Italy	4	5	4	13
4	Netherlands	4	3	3	10
5	Hungary	3	3	2	8
6	Austria	3	2	3	8
7	Greece	2	2	0	4
8	Sweden	2	1	5	8
9	Spain	1	3	4	8
10	Ukraine	1	1	1	3
11	Poland	1	0	1	2
Totals (11 entries)		34	31	31	96

=== Men's events ===
Event	Gold		Silver		Bronze	
50 m freestyle	Alain Bernard; France	21.66	Duje Draganja; Croatia	22.00	Stefan Nystrand; Sweden	22.16
100 m freestyle	Alain Bernard; France	47.50; WR	Stefan Nystrand; Sweden	48.40	Filippo Magnini; Italy	48.53
200 m freestyle	Paul Biedermann; Germany	1:46.59	Amaury Leveaux; France	1:46.99	Massimiliano Rosolino; Italy	1:47.33
400 m freestyle	Yury Prilukov; Russia	3:45.10; CR	Massimiliano Rosolino; Italy	3:45.19	Nikita Lobintsev; Russia	3:46.75
800 m freestyle	Gergő Kis; Hungary	7:51.94; CR	Samuel Pizzetti; Italy	7:54.09	Dragoș Coman; Romania	7:54.37; NR
1500 m freestyle	Yury Prilukov; Russia	14:50.40; CR	David Davies; Great Britain	14:54.28	Mateusz Sawrymowicz; Poland	14:58.78
50 m backstroke	Aristeidis Grigoriadis; Greece	25.13	Flori Lang; Switzerland	25.18	Ľuboš Križko; Slovakia	25.44
100 m backstroke	Markus Rogan; Austria	54.03	Aristeidis Grigoriadis; Greece	54.27	Arkady Vyatchanin; Russia	54.45
200 m backstroke	Markus Rogan; Austria	1:55.85	Arkady Vyatchanin; Russia	1:57.04	Răzvan Florea; Romania	1:57.53
50 m breaststroke	Oleg Lisogor; Ukraine	27.43	Alexander Dale Oen; Norway	27.53; NR	Alessandro Terrin; Italy	27.64
100 m breaststroke	Alexander Dale Oen; Norway	59.76; ER	Hugues Duboscq; France	59.78	Oleg Lisogor; Ukraine	1:00.53
200 m breaststroke	Grigory Falko; Russia	2:09.64; CR	Alexander Dale Oen; Norway	2:09.74; NR	Hugues Duboscq; France	2:09.91
50 m butterfly	Milorad Čavić; Serbia	23.11; ER	Sergiy Breus; Ukraine	23.48	Rafael Muñoz Pérez; Spain	23.60
100 m butterfly	Evgeny Korotyshkin; Russia	51.89; CR	Peter Mankoč; Slovenia	52.07	Rafael Muñoz Pérez; Spain	52.09
200 m butterfly	Ioannis Drymonakos; Greece	1:54.16; ER	Paweł Korzeniowski; Poland	1:54.38	Nikolay Skvortsov; Russia	1:54.65
200 m individual medley	László Cseh; Hungary	1:58.02	Dinko Jukić; Austria	1:59.65	Vytautas Janušaitis; Lithuania	2:00.17
400 m individual medley	László Cseh; Hungary	4:09.59; ER	Ioannis Drymonakos; Greece	4:14.72	Luca Marin; Italy	4:16.69
4 × 100 m freestyle relay	Marcus Piehl (50.56); Stefan Nystrand (47.52); Petter Stymne (49.30); Jonas Persson (48.03); Sweden	3:15.41	Massimiliano Rosolino (49.94); Alessandro Calvi (48.79); Christian Galenda (48.74); Filippo Magnini (48.20); Italy	3:15.77	Mitja Zastrow (49.14); Bas van Velthoven (49.33); Robert Lijesen (48.60); Pieter van den Hoogenband (48.81); Netherlands	3:15.88
4 × 200 m freestyle relay	Emiliano Brembilla (1:48.36); Massimiliano Rosolino (1:47.38); Nicola Cassio (1:46.57); Filippo Magnini (1:47.63); Italy	7:09.94	Nikita Lobintsev (1:48.20); Alexander Sukhorukov (1:46.97); Evgeny Lagunov (1:48.37); Yury Prilukov (1:48.16); Russia	7:11.70	Dominik Koll (1:48.21); Markus Rogan (1:48.42); David Brandl (1:48.52); Dinko Jukić (1:48.84); Austria	7:13.99
4 × 100 m medley relay	Arkady Vyatchanin (54.13); Grigory Falko (1:00.45); Evgeny Korotyshkin (51.35); Andrey Grechin (48.32); Russia	3:34.25; ER	Gordan Kožulj (55.28); Vanja Rogulj (1:00.93); Mario Todorović (51.83); Duje Draganja (48.28); Croatia	3:36.32	Simon Sjödin (56.08); Jonas Andersson (1:01.13); Lars Frölander (52.21); Stefan Nystrand (47.43); Sweden	3:36.85

=== Women's events ===
Event	Gold		Silver		Bronze	
50 m freestyle	Marleen Veldhuis; Netherlands	24.09; WR	Hinkelien Schreuder; Netherlands	24.59	Therese Alshammar; Sweden	24.71
100 m freestyle	Marleen Veldhuis; Netherlands	53.77	Hanna-Maria Seppälä; Finland	54.04	Inge Dekker; Netherlands	54.12
200 m freestyle	Sara Isaković; Slovenia	1:57.45	Camelia Potec; Romania	1:57.47	Ágnes Mutina; Hungary	1:58.06
400 m freestyle	Federica Pellegrini; Italy	4:01.53; WR	Coralie Balmy; France	4:04.15	Camelia Potec; Romania	4:05.62
800 m freestyle	Alessia Filippi; Italy	8:23.50; NR	Erika Villaécija García; Spain	8:24.08	Camelia Potec; Romania	8:25.28
1500 m freestyle	Flavia Rigamonti; Switzerland	15:58.54; CR	Erika Villaécija García; Spain	16:02.08	Lotte Friis; Denmark	16:11.26
50 m backstroke	Anastasia Zuyeva; Russia	28.05; ER	Nina Zhivanevskaya; Spain	28.11	Sanja Jovanović; Croatia	28.17
100 m backstroke	Anastasia Zuyeva; Russia	59.41; ER	Laure Manaudou; France	1:00.05	Nina Zhivanevskaya; Spain	1:00.29
200 m backstroke	Laure Manaudou; France	2:07.99	Anastasia Zuyeva; Russia	2:09.59	Nikolett Szepesi; Hungary	2:09.90
50 m breaststroke	Janne Schäfer; Germany	31.08; CR	Yuliya Yefimova; Russia	31.41	Mirna Jukić; Austria	31.59
100 m breaststroke	Mirna Jukić; Austria	1:08.18	Alena Alekseeva; Russia	1:08.91	Joline Höstman; Sweden	1:08.94
200 m breaststroke	Yuliya Yefimova; Russia	2:24.09; CR	Mirna Jukić; Austria	2:24.58	Alena Alekseeva; Russia	2:25.22
50 m butterfly	Chantal Groot; Netherlands	26.03	Inge Dekker; Netherlands	26.30	Sviatlana Khakhlova; Belarus	26.52
100 m butterfly	Sarah Sjöström; Sweden	58.44	Inge Dekker; Netherlands	58.50	Aurore Mongel; France	58.54
200 m butterfly	Aurore Mongel; France	2:06.59	Emese Kovács; Hungary	2:06.71	Mireia Belmonte García; Spain	2:09.32
200 m individual medley	Mireia Belmonte García; Spain	2:11.16; CR	Evelyn Verrasztó; Hungary	2:12.93	Camille Muffat; France	2:13.63
400 m individual medley	Alessia Filippi; Italy	4:36.68	Katinka Hosszú; Hungary	4:37.43	Yana Martynova; Russia	4:37.86
4 × 100 m freestyle relay	Inge Dekker (53.77); Ranomi Kromowidjojo (53.61); Femke Heemskerk (53.62); Marleen Veldhuis (52.62); Netherlands	3:33.62; WR	Erika Ferraioli (56.14); Federica Pellegrini (53.68); Maria Laura Simonetto (55.54); Cristina Chiuso (55.70); Italy	3:41.06	Claire Hedenskog (55.56); Josefin Lillhage (54.36); Ida Marko-Varga (55.33); Magdalena Kuras (56.03); Sweden	3:41.28
4 × 200 m freestyle relay	Laure Manaudou (1:58.51); Coralie Balmy (1:56.58); Mylène Lazare (1:59.39); Alena Popchanka (1:57.61); France	7:52.09	Joanne Jackson (1:59.10); Melanie Marshall (1:57.81); Ellen Gandy (1:59.26); Caitlin McClatchey (1:56.19); Great Britain	7:52.36	Alice Carpanese (2:01.06); Federica Pellegrini (1:54.98); Alessia Filippi (1:58.47); Renata Spagnolo (2:01.18); Italy	7:55.69
4 × 100 m medley relay	Elizabeth Simmonds (1:01.20); Kate Haywood (1:07.11); Jemma Lowe (58.00); Francesca Halsall (53.02); Great Britain	3:59.33; ER	Anastasia Zuyeva (59.72); Yuliya Yefimova (1:07.30); Natalya Sutyagina (58.29); Daria Belyakina (55.16); Russia	4:00.47	Hinkelien Schreuder (1:03.30); Jolijn van Valkengoed (1:10.67); Inge Dekker (57.69); Marleen Veldhuis (52.75); Netherlands	4:04.41

== Diving ==
=== Medal table ===
Rank	Nation	Gold	Silver	Bronze	Total
1	Russia	4	0	1	5
2	Germany	2	4	1	7
3	Ukraine	1	3	3	7
4	Italy	1	0	3	4
5	Sweden	1	0	1	2
6	Great Britain	1	0	0	1
7	Finland	0	1	1	2
8	Belarus	0	1	0	1
8	Hungary	0	1	0	1
Totals (9 entries)		10	10	10	30

=== Results ===
==== Men's events ====
Event	Gold		Silver		Bronze	
1 m springboard	Illya Kvasha; Ukraine	454.65	Joona Puhakka; Finland	432.80	Christopher Sacchin; Italy	423.80
3 m springboard	Dmitry Sautin; Russia	493.70	Illya Kvasha; Ukraine	468.70	Joona Puhakka; Finland	441.80
3 m springboard synchro	Yuriy Kunakov; Dmitry Sautin; Russia	440.76	Tobias Schellenberg; Andreas Wels; Germany	413.94	Dmytro Lysenko; Anton Zakharov; Ukraine	406.56
10 m platform	Tom Daley; Great Britain	491.95	Sascha Klein; Germany	487.60	Francesco Dell'Uomo; Italy	481.30
10 m platform synchro	Patrick Hausding; Sascha Klein; Germany	453.24	Vadim Kaptur; Aliaksandr Varlamau; Belarus	427.35	Konstantin Khanbekov; Oleg Vikulov; Russia	426.24

==== Women's events ====
Event	Gold		Silver		Bronze	
1 m springboard	Anna Lindberg; Sweden	293.85	Nóra Barta; Hungary	270.60	Katja Dieckow; Germany	264.15
3 m springboard	Yuliya Pakhalina; Russia	347.40	Katja Dieckow; Germany	330.80	Olena Fedorova; Ukraine	319.70
3 m springboard synchro	Yuliya Pakhalina; Anastasia Pozdnyakova; Russia	327.57	Heike Fischer; Ditte Kotzian; Germany	305.64	Olena Fedorova; Alevtina Korolyova; Ukraine	301.86
10 m platform	Tania Cagnotto; Italy	355.35	Iuliia Prokopchuk; Ukraine	328.35	Elina Eggers; Sweden	319.65
10 m platform synchro	Annett Gamm; Nora Subschinski; Germany	336.63	Alina Chaplenko; Iuliia Prokopchuk; Ukraine	334.20	Noemi Batki; Tania Cagnotto; Italy	323.13

== Synchronised swimming ==
=== Medal table ===
Rank	Nation	Gold	Silver	Bronze	Total
1	Spain	4	0	0	4
2	Italy	0	3	1	4
3	Russia	0	1	0	1
4	Ukraine	0	0	3	3
Totals (4 entries)		4	4	4	12

=== Results ===
Event	Gold		Silver		Bronze	
Solo free routine	Gemma Mengual; Spain	98.400	Natalia Ishchenko; Russia	98.300	Beatrice Adelizzi; Italy	94.000
Duet free routine	Gemma Mengual; Andrea Fuentes; Spain	97.800	Beatrice Adelizzi; Giulia Lapi; Italy	94.900	Daria Iushko; Xenia Sidorenko; Ukraine	93.900
Team free routine	Alba Cabello; Ona Carbonell; Raquel Corral; Andrea Fuentes; Thaïs Henríquez; Gemma Mengual; Irina Rodríguez; Paola Tirados; Spain	97.800	Alessia Bigi; Elisa Bozzo; Costanza Fiorentini; Manila Flamini; Francesca Gangemi; Mariangela Perrupato; Sara Sgarzi; Federica Tommasi; Italy	95.200	Anna Bagirova; Nadiya Berezhna; Anastasiya Chepak; Daria Iushko; Ganna Khmelnytska; Olga Kondrashova; Yuliya Maryanko; Kseniya Sydorenko; Ukraine	93.300
Free combination routine	Alba Cabello; Raquel Corral; Andrea Fuentes; Thaïs Henríquez; Laura López; Gemma Mengual; Gisela Morón; Irina Rodríguez; Paola Tirados; Cristina Violán; Spain	97.900	Alessia Bigi; Elisa Bozzo; Costanza Fiorentini; Manila Flamini; Francesca Gangemi; Mariangela Perrupato; Dalila Schiesaro; Sara Sgarzi; Federica Tommasi; Italy	95.100	Anna Bagirova; Nadiya Berezhna; Anastasiya Chepak; Inga Giller; Daria Iushko; Ganna Khmelnytska; Olga Kondrashova; Yuliya Maryanko; Olga Shevchuk; Kseniya Sydorenko; Ukraine	94.100

== See also ==
- LEN European Aquatics Championships
- Ligue Européenne de Natation (LEN)
