= Despoina Solomou =

Greek synchronized swimmer

Personal information
- Nationality: Greece
- Born: 18 August 1990 (age 35) Marousi, Greece
- Height: 168 cm (5 ft 6 in)
- Weight: 53 kg (117 lb)

Sport
- Sport: Swimming
- Strokes: Synchronized swimming
- Club: Ballets Nautiques de Strasbourg

Despoina Solomou (born 18 August 1990) is a Greek synchronized swimmer who competed in the 2008 and 2012 Summer Olympics. On both occasions, she competed in the women's duets. In 2008, she competed with Evanthia Makrygianni and in 2012, she competed with Evangelia Platanioti. Solomou took up the sport at the age of six, and made her international debut in 2006. In 2007, she won the duet event at the European Junior Championships. She retired in 2014, due to lack of funding and currently coaches at Lugano Nuoto in Switzerland.
