= Nadine Brandl =

Austrian synchronized swimmer

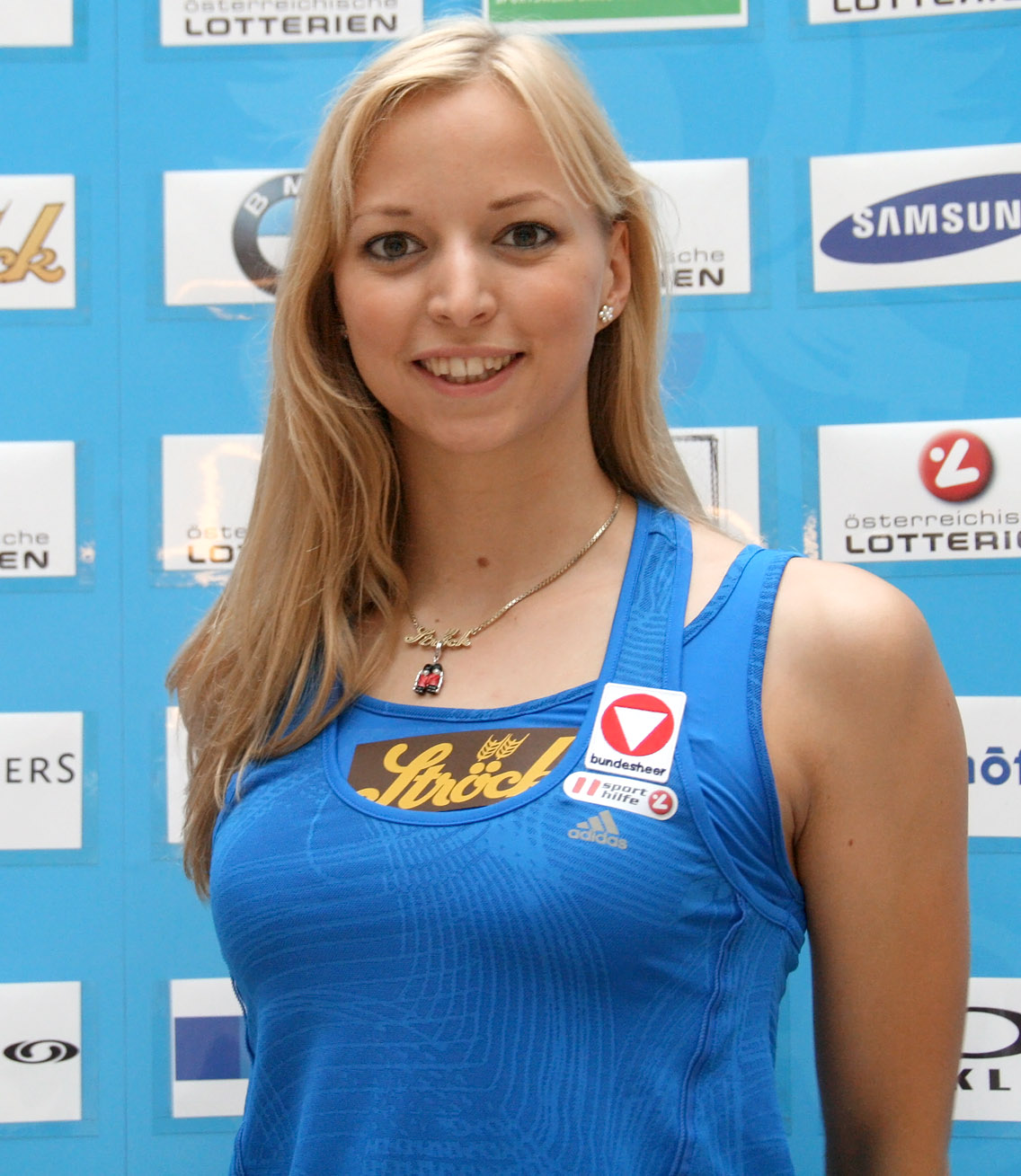
- Nadine Brandl in 2012

Personal information
- Nationality: Austria
- Born: 11 March 1990 (age 36) Vienna, Austria
- Height: 168 cm (5 ft 6 in)
- Weight: 53 kg (117 lb)

Sport
- Sport: Swimming
- Strokes: Synchronized swimming
- Club: Schwimm-Union Wien

Nadine Brandl (born 11 March 1990) is an Austrian synchronized swimmer.

Nadine competed in the women's duet at both the 2008 (with Lisbeth Mahn) and 2012 Summer Olympics (with Livia Lang) finishing in 22nd and 19th place respectively. Several other members of her family have represented Austria at the Olympics in aquatic events (Alexandra Worisch, Michael Worisch, Franz Worisch and Eva Pfarrhofer).
