= Elisabeth Mahn =

Austrian synchronized swimmer

Personal information
- Nationality: Austria
- Born: 2 April 1986 (age 40) Tulln an der Donau, Austria
- Height: 169 cm (5 ft 7 in)
- Weight: 58 kg (128 lb)

Sport
- Sport: Swimming
- Strokes: Synchronized swimming
- Club: Schwimmunion Mödling

Elisabeth Mahn (born 2 April 1986) is an Austrian synchronized swimmer.

Elisabeth competed in the women's duet at the 2008 Summer Olympics and finished in 22nd place with her partner Nadine Brandl.
