= Spain at the 2013 World Aquatics Championships =

- Flag of Spain
- World Aquatics code: ESP
- National federation: Real Federación Española de Natación
- Website: www.rfen.es

in Barcelona, Spain
- Medals Ranked 10th: Gold 1 Silver 6 Bronze 5 Total 12

World Aquatics Championships appearances
- 1973; 1975; 1978; 1982; 1986; 1991; 1994; 1998; 2001; 2003; 2005; 2007; 2009; 2011; 2013; 2015; 2017; 2019; 2022; 2023; 2024; 2025

Spain competed at the 2013 World Aquatics Championships in Barcelona, Catalonia, Spain between 19 July and 4 August 2013 as the host nation.

== Medalists ==
Medal	Name	Sport	Event	Date
Gold	Spain women's national water polo team: Marta Bach; Andrea Blas; Anna Espar; Laura Ester; Maica García Godoy; Patricia Herrera; Laura López; Ona Meseguer; Lorena Miranda; Matilde Ortiz; Jennifer Pareja; Pilar Peña Carrasco; Roser Tarragó	Water polo	Women's tournament	2 August
Silver	Clara Basiana; Alba María Cabello; Clara Camacho; Ona Carbonell; Margalida Crespí; Thaïs Henríquez; Paula Klamburg; Sara Levy; Meritxell Mas; Cristina Salvador	Synchronized swimming	Team technical routine	22 July
Silver	Clara Basiana; Alba María Cabello; Ona Carbonell; Margalida Crespí; Thaïs Henríquez; Paula Klamburg; Sara Levy; Meritxell Mas; Laia Pons; Cristina Salvador	Synchronized swimming	Team free routine	26 July
Silver	Clara Basiana; Alba María Cabello; Ona Carbonell; Margalida Crespí; Thaïs Henríquez; Paula Klamburg; Sara Levy; Meritxell Mas; Laia Pons; Cristina Salvador	Synchronized swimming	Free routine combination	27 July
Silver	Melanie Costa	Swimming	Women's 400 m freestyle	28 July
Silver	Mireia Belmonte	Swimming	Women's 200 m butterfly	1 August
Silver	Mireia Belmonte	Swimming	Women's 400 metre individual medley	4 August
Bronze	Ona Carbonell	Synchronized swimming	Solo technical routine	20 July
Bronze	Ona Carbonell; Margalida Crespí	Synchronized swimming	Duet technical routine	21 July
Bronze	Ona Carbonell	Synchronized swimming	Solo free routine	24 July
Bronze	Ona Carbonell; Margalida Crespí	Synchronized swimming	Duet free routine	25 July
Bronze	Mireia Belmonte	Swimming	Women's 200 m individual medley	29 July

== Diving ==
Spain qualified 5 quota places for the following diving events.

Men

Athlete	Event	Preliminaries		Semifinals		Final	
Athlete	Event	Points	Rank	Points	Rank	Points	Rank
Nicolás García	1 m springboard	312.90	22	—N/a		did not advance	
Nicolás García	3 m springboard	307.10	42	did not advance			
Javier Illana	3 m springboard	439.70	4 Q	434.45	8 Q	468.15	6
Héctor García; Nicolás García	3 m synchronized springboard	341.16	14	—N/a		did not advance	

Women

Athlete	Event	Preliminaries		Semifinals		Final	
Athlete	Event	Points	Rank	Points	Rank	Points	Rank
Jenifer Benítez	1 m springboard	185.00	38	—N/a		did not advance	
Jenifer Benítez	3 m springboard	192.70	39	did not advance			
Rocío Velásquez	3 m springboard	177.30	41	did not advance			

== Open water swimming ==
Spain qualified five quota places for the following events in open water swimming:

Athlete	Event	Time	Rank
Miguel Rozas	Men's 5 km	53:40.6	15
Miguel Rozas	Men's 10 km	1:50:18.0	27
Thomas Snelson	Men's 5 km	53:49.3	26
Thomas Snelson	Men's 10 km	1:50:25.1	37
Margarita Domínguez	Women's 5 km	57:04.4	16
Margarita Domínguez	Women's 25 km	5:11:55.5	7
Yurema Requena	Women's 5 km	57:00.1	13
Yurema Requena	Women's 10 km	1:58:26.4	16
Erika Villaécija García	Women's 10 km	1:58:27.8	17

== Swimming ==
Spanish swimmers achieved qualifying standards in the following events (up to a maximum of 2 swimmers in each event at the A-standard entry time, and 1 at the B-standard):

Men

Athlete	Event	Heat		Semifinal		Final	
Athlete	Event	Time	Rank	Time	Rank	Time	Rank
Víctor Martín	200 m freestyle	1:49.22	27	did not advance			
Aitor Martínez	100 m freestyle	49.83	28	did not advance			
Rafael Muñoz	50 m butterfly	23.17	2 Q	23.19	9	did not advance	
Rafael Muñoz	100 m butterfly	52.94	23	did not advance			
Albert Puig	200 m individual medley	2:00.49	21	did not advance			
Juan Miguel Rando	50 m backstroke	25.52	16 Q	25.28	14	did not advance	
Marc Sánchez	800 m freestyle	7:57.64	15	—N/a		did not advance	
Marc Sánchez	1500 m freestyle	15:13.98	16	—N/a		did not advance	
Aschwin Wildeboer	50 m backstroke	24.72	2 Q	24.90	6 Q	24.58	4
Aschwin Wildeboer	100 m backstroke	54.75	17	did not advance			
Markel Alberdi; Aitor Martínez; Juan Miguel Rando; Aschwin Wildeboer	4 × 100 m freestyle relay	DSQ		—N/a		did not advance	
Marc Sánchez; Víctor Martín; Albert Puig; Gerard Rodríguez	4 × 200 m freestyle relay	7:17.59	13	—N/a		did not advance	

Women

Athlete	Event	Heat		Semifinal		Final	
Athlete	Event	Time	Rank	Time	Rank	Time	Rank
Mireia Belmonte	400 m freestyle	4:06.76	9	—N/a		did not advance	
Mireia Belmonte	800 m freestyle	8:25.03	4 Q	—N/a		8:21.99	5
Mireia Belmonte	1500 m freestyle	16:00.31	4 Q	—N/a		15:58.83	4
Mireia Belmonte	200 m butterfly	2:07.21	1 Q	2:06.53	1 Q	2:04.78	2nd place, silver medalist(s)
Mireia Belmonte	200 m individual medley	2:12.11	8 Q	2:10.66	5 Q	2:09.45	3rd place, bronze medalist(s)
Mireia Belmonte	400 m individual medley	4:34.64	2 Q	—N/a		4:31.21	2nd place, silver medalist(s)
Patricia Castro	200 m freestyle	2:00.36	23	did not advance			
Melanie Costa	100 m freestyle	55.51	23	did not advance			
Melanie Costa	200 m freestyle	1:57.01	6 Q	1:56.19 NR	3 Q	1:57.04	5
Melanie Costa	400 m freestyle	4:04.20	2 Q	—N/a		4:02.47 NR	2nd place, silver medalist(s)
Duane da Rocha	50 m backstroke	28.37	=9 Q	28.25	=10	did not advance	
Duane da Rocha	100 m backstroke	1:00.80	12 Q	1:00.53	10	did not advance	
Duane da Rocha	200 m backstroke	2:14.01	21	did not advance			
Marina García	50 m breaststroke	31.22	11 Q	31.24	10	did not advance	
Marina García	100 m breaststroke	1:07.18 NR	7 Q	1:07.12 NR	8 Q	1:07.08 NR	7
Marina García	200 m breaststroke	2:24.21 NR	5 Q	2:22.88 NR	3 Q	2:23.55	6
Beatriz Gómez Cortés	800 m freestyle	8:37.26	19	—N/a		did not advance	
Beatriz Gómez Cortés	200 m individual medley	2:13.98	15 Q	2:15.11	15	did not advance	
Beatriz Gómez Cortés	400 m individual medley	4:42.78	14	—N/a		did not advance	
Judit Ignacio Sorribes	100 m butterfly	59.18	=16*	did not advance			
Judit Ignacio Sorribes	200 m butterfly	2:09.48	11 Q	2:07.86	8 Q	2:08.40	8
Mercedes Peris	50 m backstroke	28.07	4 Q	27.71	3 Q	27.93	5
Mercedes Peris	100 m backstroke	1:01.19	14 Q	1:01.59	16	did not advance	
Jessica Vall Montero	50 m breaststroke	31.77	26	did not advance			
Jessica Vall Montero	200 m breaststroke	2:26.62	9 Q	2:27.00	13	did not advance	
Erika Villaécija García	1500 m freestyle	16:25.07	15	—N/a		did not advance	
Patricia Castro; Melanie Costa; Beatriz Gómez Cortés; Marta González	4 × 100 m freestyle relay	3:42.08 NR	12	—N/a		did not advance	
Mireia Belmonte; Patricia Castro; Melanie Costa; Beatriz Gómez Cortés	4 × 200 m freestyle relay	7:54.90	4 Q	—N/a		7:53.20	5
Melanie Costa; Duane da Rocha; Marina García; Judit Ignacio Sorribes	4 × 100 m medley relay	4:03.79	10	—N/a		did not advance	

== Synchronized swimming ==
Spain qualified 12 quota places for each of the following synchronized swimming events.

Athlete	Event	Preliminaries		Final	
Athlete	Event	Points	Rank	Points	Rank
Ona Carbonell	Solo free routine	94.260	3 Q	94.290	3rd place, bronze medalist(s)
Ona Carbonell	Solo technical routine	94.200	3 Q	94.400	3rd place, bronze medalist(s)
Ona Carbonell; Margalida Crespí	Duet free routine	94.270	3 Q	94.990	3rd place, bronze medalist(s)
Ona Carbonell; Margalida Crespí	Duet technical routine	93.900	3 Q	93.800	3rd place, bronze medalist(s)
Clara Basiana; Alba María Cabello; Ona Carbonell; Margalida Crespí; Thaïs Henríquez; Paula Klamburg; Sara Levy; Meritxell Mas; Laia Pons*; Cristina Salvador*	Team free routine	94.100	2 Q	94.230	2nd place, silver medalist(s)
Clara Basiana; Alba María Cabello; Clara Camacho*; Ona Carbonell*; Margalida Crespí; Thaïs Henríquez; Paula Klamburg; Sara Levy; Meritxell Mas; Cristina Salvador	Team technical routine	94.700	2 Q	94.400	2nd place, silver medalist(s)
Clara Basiana; Alba Cabello; Clara Camacho*; Ona Carbonell; Margalida Crespí; Thaïs Henríquez; Paula Klamburg; Sara Levy; Meritxell Mas; Irene Montrucchio*; Laia Pons; Cristina Salvador	Free routine combination	94.040	2 Q	94.620	2nd place, silver medalist(s)

== Water polo ==
=== Men's tournament ===
Team roster

- Iñaki Aguilar
- Ricard Alarcón
- Ruben de Lera
- Albert Español
- Pere Estrany
- Xavier García
- Daniel López
- Marc Minguell
- Guillermo Molina
- Alberto Munarriz
- Felipe Perrone
- Balázs Szirányi
- Xavier Vallès

Group play

	Pld	W	D	L	GF	GA	GD	Pts
Greece	3	3	0	0	38	15	+23	6
Montenegro	3	2	0	1	34	12	+22	4
Spain	3	1	0	2	30	18	+12	2
New Zealand	3	0	0	3	8	65	−57	0

22 July 2013; 21:30	Report	Spain	18–3	New Zealand	Piscines Bernat Picornell, Barcelona; Attendance: 900; Referees: Balfanbayev (KAZ), Gaber (EGY)
22 July 2013; 21:30	Report	Score by quarters: 3–0, 3–1, 7–1, 5–1			Piscines Bernat Picornell, Barcelona; Attendance: 900; Referees: Balfanbayev (KAZ), Gaber (EGY)
22 July 2013; 21:30	Report	Perrone 5	Goals	Lui-Fakaotimanava 2	Piscines Bernat Picornell, Barcelona; Attendance: 900; Referees: Balfanbayev (KAZ), Gaber (EGY)

24 July 2013; 21:30	Report	Montenegro	7–5	Spain	Piscines Bernat Picornell, Barcelona; Attendance: 2,800; Referees: Vogel (HUN), Alexandrescu (ROU)
24 July 2013; 21:30	Report	Score by quarters: 2–3, 2–2, 2–0, 1–0			Piscines Bernat Picornell, Barcelona; Attendance: 2,800; Referees: Vogel (HUN), Alexandrescu (ROU)
24 July 2013; 21:30	Report	Janović 5	Goals	Español 2	Piscines Bernat Picornell, Barcelona; Attendance: 2,800; Referees: Vogel (HUN), Alexandrescu (ROU)

26 July 2013; 21:30	Report	Spain	7–8	Greece	Piscines Bernat Picornell, Barcelona; Attendance: 2,500; Referees: Koryzna (POL), Bianchi (ITA)
26 July 2013; 21:30	Report	Score by quarters: 1–1, 0–2, 2–3, 4–2			Piscines Bernat Picornell, Barcelona; Attendance: 2,500; Referees: Koryzna (POL), Bianchi (ITA)
26 July 2013; 21:30	Report	Molina, Minguell 3	Goals	Mylonakis 3	Piscines Bernat Picornell, Barcelona; Attendance: 2,500; Referees: Koryzna (POL), Bianchi (ITA)

Round of 16

28 July 2013; 13:30	Report	United States	6–10	Spain	Piscines Bernat Picornell, Barcelona; Attendance: 1,300; Referees: Peris (CRO), Alexandrescu (ROU)
28 July 2013; 13:30	Report	Score by quarters: 2–4, 2–1, 1–2, 1–3			Piscines Bernat Picornell, Barcelona; Attendance: 1,300; Referees: Peris (CRO), Alexandrescu (ROU)
28 July 2013; 13:30	Report	Wigo 3	Goals	Español 4	Piscines Bernat Picornell, Barcelona; Attendance: 1,300; Referees: Peris (CRO), Alexandrescu (ROU)

Quarterfinal

30 July 2013; 21:45	Report	Spain	3–4	Italy	Piscines Bernat Picornell, Barcelona; Attendance: 4,500; Referees: Stavridis (GRE), Alexandrescu (ROU)
30 July 2013; 21:45	Report	Score by quarters: 2–2, 1–1, 0–1, 0–0			Piscines Bernat Picornell, Barcelona; Attendance: 4,500; Referees: Stavridis (GRE), Alexandrescu (ROU)
30 July 2013; 21:45	Report	three players 1	Goals	Figlioli 2	Piscines Bernat Picornell, Barcelona; Attendance: 4,500; Referees: Stavridis (GRE), Alexandrescu (ROU)

5th–8th place semifinal

1 August 2013; 17:00	Report	Serbia	13–14 (OT)	Spain	Piscines Bernat Picornell, Barcelona; Attendance: 1,000; Referees: Koganov (AZE), Moller (ARG)
1 August 2013; 17:00	Report	Score by quarters: 2–2, 1–0, 2–3, 1–1 OT: 2–1, 0–1 pen. 5–6			Piscines Bernat Picornell, Barcelona; Attendance: 1,000; Referees: Koganov (AZE), Moller (ARG)
1 August 2013; 17:00	Report	Pijetlović, Filipović 2	Goals	three players 3	Piscines Bernat Picornell, Barcelona; Attendance: 1,000; Referees: Koganov (AZE), Moller (ARG)

Fifth place game

3 August 2013; 20:45	Report	Greece	8–10	Spain	Piscines Bernat Picornell, Barcelona; Attendance: 4,000; Referees: Golijanin (SRB), Flahive (AUS)
3 August 2013; 20:45	Report	Score by quarters: 2–1, 2–5, 4–2, 0–2			Piscines Bernat Picornell, Barcelona; Attendance: 4,000; Referees: Golijanin (SRB), Flahive (AUS)
3 August 2013; 20:45	Report	Delakas 3	Goals	Español 5	Piscines Bernat Picornell, Barcelona; Attendance: 4,000; Referees: Golijanin (SRB), Flahive (AUS)

=== Women's tournament ===
Team roster

- Marta Bach
- Andrea Blas
- Anna Espar
- Laura Ester
- Maica García Godoy
- Patricia Herrera
- Laura López
- Ona Meseguer
- Lorena Miranda
- Matilde Ortiz
- Jennifer Pareja
- Pilar Peña Carrasco
- Roser Tarragó

Group play

	Pld	W	D	L	GF	GA	GD	Pts
Russia	3	2	1	0	41	24	+17	5
Spain	3	2	0	1	40	23	+17	4
Netherlands	3	1	1	1	54	29	+25	3
Uzbekistan	3	0	0	3	13	72	−59	0

21 July 2013; 21:30	Report	Spain	14–12	Netherlands	Piscines Bernat Picornell, Barcelona; Attendance: 1,300; Referees: Bianchi (ITA), Bender (GER)
21 July 2013; 21:30	Report	Score by quarters: 2–4, 5–1, 3–3, 4–4			Piscines Bernat Picornell, Barcelona; Attendance: 1,300; Referees: Bianchi (ITA), Bender (GER)
21 July 2013; 21:30	Report	Espar, Peña 3	Goals	Smit 4	Piscines Bernat Picornell, Barcelona; Attendance: 1,300; Referees: Bianchi (ITA), Bender (GER)

23 July 2013; 21:30	Report	Spain	6–7	Russia	Piscines Bernat Picornell, Barcelona; Attendance: 1,500; Referees: Drury (USA), Flahive (AUS)
23 July 2013; 21:30	Report	Score by quarters: 0–1, 2–1, 1–3, 3–2			Piscines Bernat Picornell, Barcelona; Attendance: 1,500; Referees: Drury (USA), Flahive (AUS)
23 July 2013; 21:30	Report	López 3	Goals	Prokofyeva 4	Piscines Bernat Picornell, Barcelona; Attendance: 1,500; Referees: Drury (USA), Flahive (AUS)

25 July 2013; 21:30	Report	Spain	20–4	Uzbekistan	Piscines Bernat Picornell, Barcelona; Attendance: 800; Referees: Vogel (HUN), Drury (USA)
25 July 2013; 21:30	Report	Score by quarters: 8–1, 3–0, 6–0, 3–3			Piscines Bernat Picornell, Barcelona; Attendance: 800; Referees: Vogel (HUN), Drury (USA)
25 July 2013; 21:30	Report	Blas 6	Goals	Plyusova, Halikova 2	Piscines Bernat Picornell, Barcelona; Attendance: 800; Referees: Vogel (HUN), Drury (USA)

Round of 16

27 July 2013; 13:30	Report	Spain	18–6	New Zealand	Piscines Bernat Picornell, Barcelona; Attendance: 450; Referees: Melliar (RSA), Golijanin (SRB)
27 July 2013; 13:30	Report	Score by quarters: 5–1, 4–2, 3–2, 6–1			Piscines Bernat Picornell, Barcelona; Attendance: 450; Referees: Melliar (RSA), Golijanin (SRB)
27 July 2013; 13:30	Report	Pareja 5	Goals	Hudson, Myles 2	Piscines Bernat Picornell, Barcelona; Attendance: 450; Referees: Melliar (RSA), Golijanin (SRB)

Quarterfinal

29 July 2013; 21:45	Report	Spain	9–6	United States	Piscines Bernat Picornell, Barcelona; Attendance: 3,300; Referees: Koryzna (POL), Bianchi (ITA)
29 July 2013; 21:45	Report	Score by quarters: 4–2, 1–2, 1–1, 3–1			Piscines Bernat Picornell, Barcelona; Attendance: 3,300; Referees: Koryzna (POL), Bianchi (ITA)
29 July 2013; 21:45	Report	Pareja 4	Goals	Craig 3	Piscines Bernat Picornell, Barcelona; Attendance: 3,300; Referees: Koryzna (POL), Bianchi (ITA)

Semifinal

31 July 2013; 21:45	Report	Spain	13–12	Hungary	Piscines Bernat Picornell, Barcelona; Attendance: 3,200; Referees: Drury (USA), Alexandrescu (ROU)
31 July 2013; 21:45	Report	Score by quarters: 5–5, 4–4, 2–3, 2–0			Piscines Bernat Picornell, Barcelona; Attendance: 3,200; Referees: Drury (USA), Alexandrescu (ROU)
31 July 2013; 21:45	Report	Espar 4	Goals	Antal 4	Piscines Bernat Picornell, Barcelona; Attendance: 3,200; Referees: Drury (USA), Alexandrescu (ROU)

Final

2 August 2013; 22:15	Report	Australia	6–8	Spain	Piscines Bernat Picornell, Barcelona; Attendance: 4,500; Referees: Koryzna (POL), Bender (GER)
2 August 2013; 22:15	Report	Score by quarters: 1–2, 2–3, 1–1, 2–2			Piscines Bernat Picornell, Barcelona; Attendance: 4,500; Referees: Koryzna (POL), Bender (GER)
2 August 2013; 22:15	Report	six players 1	Goals	three players 2	Piscines Bernat Picornell, Barcelona; Attendance: 4,500; Referees: Koryzna (POL), Bender (GER)
