= Spain at the 2015 World Aquatics Championships =

- Flag of Spain
- World Aquatics code: ESP
- National federation: Real Federación Española de Natación
- Website: www.rfen.es

in Kazan, Russia
- Competitors: 48 in 6 sports
- Medals Ranked 22nd: Gold 0 Silver 1 Bronze 2 Total 3

World Aquatics Championships appearances
- 1973; 1975; 1978; 1982; 1986; 1991; 1994; 1998; 2001; 2003; 2005; 2007; 2009; 2011; 2013; 2015; 2017; 2019; 2022; 2023; 2024; 2025

Spain competed at the 2015 World Aquatics Championships in Kazan, Russia from 24 July to 9 August 2015.

== Medalists ==
Medal	Name	Sport	Event	Date
Silver	Ona Carbonell	Synchronized swimming	Solo technical routine	July 25
Bronze	Ona Carbonell	Synchronized swimming	Solo free routine	July 29
Bronze	Jessica Vall	Swimming	Women's 200 m breaststroke	August 7

== Diving ==
Spanish divers qualified for the individual spots and the synchronized teams at the World Championships.

Men

Athlete	Event	Preliminaries		Semifinals		Final	
Athlete	Event	Points	Rank	Points	Rank	Points	Rank
Héctor García	1 m springboard	294.55	29	—N/a		Did not advance	
Héctor García	3 m springboard	274.10	56	Did not advance			
Nicolás García	1 m springboard	310.00	25	—N/a		Did not advance	
Nicolás García	3 m springboard	328.55	43	Did not advance			
Héctor García; Nicolás García	3 m synchronized springboard	360.03	17	—N/a		Did not advance	

Women

Athlete	Event	Preliminaries		Semifinals		Final	
Athlete	Event	Points	Rank	Points	Rank	Points	Rank
Rocío Velásquez	1 m springboard	204.00	30	—N/a		Did not advance	
Rocío Velásquez	3 m springboard	226.80	39	Did not advance			

== High diving ==
Spain has qualified one high diver at the World Championships.

Athlete	Event	Points	Rank
Carlos Gimeno	Men's high diving	391.65	13

== Open water swimming ==
Spain sent a full team of five swimmers to compete in the open water marathon.

Athlete	Event	Time	Rank
Antonio Arroyo	Men's 5 km	55:24.6	10
Antonio Arroyo	Men's 10 km	1:54:00.2	47
Héctor Ruiz	Men's 5 km	Did not start	
Héctor Ruiz	Men's 10 km	1:58:22.2	58
Margarita Domínguez	Women's 25 km	5:19:39.4	6
Erika Villaécija García	Women's 5 km	59:15.0	10
Erika Villaécija García	Women's 10 km	1:59:33.8	21
María Vilas	Women's 5 km	1:00:53.6	24
María Vilas	Women's 10 km	1:59:38.2	24
Antonio Arroyo; Héctor Ruiz; Erika Villaécija García	Mixed team	57:16.0	12

== Swimming ==
Spanish swimmers have achieved qualifying standards in the following events (up to a maximum of 2 swimmers in each event at the A-standard entry time, and 1 at the B-standard): Swimmers must qualify at the 2015 Spanish Open Spring Championships (for pool events) to confirm their places for the Worlds.

The Spanish team consists of 14 swimmers (seven men and seven women). Two-time Olympic silver medalist Mireia Belmonte García was set to compete for the Worlds, but later withdrew from the team because of shoulder injury.

Men

Athlete	Event	Heat		Semifinal		Final	
Athlete	Event	Time	Rank	Time	Rank	Time	Rank
Miguel Durán	200 m freestyle	1:49.05	32	Did not advance			
Miguel Durán	400 m freestyle	3:50.07	=21	—N/a		Did not advance	
Rafael Muñoz	50 m butterfly	23.36	3 Q	23.44	=12	Did not advance	
Miguel Ortíz-Cañavete	50 m freestyle	22.66	=25	Did not advance			
Miguel Ortíz-Cañavete	50 m backstroke	25.29	=16 Q	25.19	14	Did not advance	
Juan Miguel Rando	100 m backstroke	54.81	=26	Did not advance			
Juan Miguel Rando	50 m backstroke	25.54	25	Did not advance			
Marc Sánchez	800 m freestyle	7:51.19	12	—N/a		Did not advance	
Marc Sánchez	1500 m freestyle	15:12.79	16	—N/a		Did not advance	
Marc Sánchez	400 m individual medley	4:21.26	24	—N/a		Did not advance	
Miguel Durán; Víctor Martín; Albert Puig; Marc Sánchez	4 × 200 m freestyle relay	7:11.39	9	—N/a		Did not advance	

Women

Athlete	Event	Heat		Semifinal		Final	
Athlete	Event	Time	Rank	Time	Rank	Time	Rank
Melania Costa	200 m freestyle	1:59.00	18	Did not advance			
Melania Costa	400 m freestyle	4:07.58	8 Q	—N/a		4:06.50	6
Melania Costa	800 m freestyle	8:34.89	13	—N/a		Did not advance	
Melania Costa	200 m backstroke	DNS		Did not advance			
Duane da Rocha	100 m backstroke	1:01.63	31	Did not advance			
Duane da Rocha	200 m backstroke	2:11.53	16 Q	2:12.90	15	Did not advance	
Marina García	100 m breaststroke	1:07.97	22	Did not advance			
Marina García	200 m breaststroke	2:25.32	13 Q	2:25.52	16	Did not advance	
Beatriz Gómez Cortés	800 m freestyle	8:41.72	22	—N/a		Did not advance	
Beatriz Gómez Cortés	400 m individual medley	4:44.51	20	—N/a		Did not advance	
Judit Ignacio Sorribes	100 m butterfly	59.87	33	Did not advance			
Judit Ignacio Sorribes	200 m butterfly	2:09.93	18	Did not advance			
Jessica Vall Montero	100 m breaststroke	1:07.13	10 Q	1:08.02	16	Did not advance	
Jessica Vall Montero	200 m breaststroke	2:23.97	7 Q	2:22.90	7 Q	2:22.76	3rd place, bronze medalist(s)
Melania Costa; Duane da Rocha; Judit Ignacio Sorribes; Jessica Vall Montero	4 × 100 m medley relay	4:03.91	16	—N/a		Did not advance	

== Synchronized swimming ==
Spain fielded a full squad of thirteen synchronized swimmers (one male and twelve female) to compete in each of the following events.

Women

Athlete	Event	Preliminaries		Final	
Athlete	Event	Points	Rank	Points	Rank
Ona Carbonell	Solo technical routine	91.4408	2 Q	93.1284	2nd place, silver medalist(s)
Ona Carbonell	Solo free routine	94.5000	3 Q	94.9000	3rd place, bronze medalist(s)
Clara Camacho; Ona Carbonell	Duet technical routine	89.3526	5 Q	90.0157	5
Ona Carbonell; Paula Klamburg	Duet free routine	91.7000	5 Q	92.2333	5
Amber Bakker*; Clara Basiana; Alba María Cabello*; Clara Camacho; Cecilia Jiménez; Paula Klamburg; Sara Levy; Meritxell Mas; Paula Ramiréz; Cristina Salvador	Team technical routine	91.3755	5 Q	90.8720	5
Clara Basiana; Alba María Cabello; Clara Camacho; Cecilia Jiménez; Paula Klamburg; Sara Levy; Meritxell Mas; Paula Ramiréz*; Cristina Salvador; Itziar Sánchez*	Team free routine	91.9000	5 Q	92.4667	5
Amber Bakker*; Clara Basiana; Alba María Cabello; Clara Camacho; Cecilia Jiménez; Paula Klamburg; Sara Levy; Meritxell Mas; Paula Ramiréz*; Cristina Salvador; Itziar Sánchez	Free routine combination	91.9000	5 Q	92.3667	5

Mixed

Athlete	Event	Preliminaries		Final	
Athlete	Event	Points	Rank	Points	Rank
Pau Ribes; Gemma Mengual	Duet free routine	86.9000	5 Q	86.8000	5

== Water polo ==
=== Women's tournament ===
Team roster

- Laura Ester
- Marta Bach
- Anni Espar
- Paula Leitón
- Matilde Ortiz
- Jennifer Pareja
- Clara Espar
- Pilar Peña
- Judith Forca
- Roser Tarragó
- Maica García
- Laura López
- Patricia Herrera

Group play

Pos	Team	Pld	W	D	L	GF	GA	GD	Pts	Qualification
1	Spain	3	3	0	0	49	15	+34	6	Advanced to quarterfinals
2	Canada	3	2	0	1	38	22	+16	4	Advanced to playoffs
3	Kazakhstan	3	1	0	2	25	35	−10	2	Advanced to playoffs
4	New Zealand	3	0	0	3	12	52	−40	0	

Source: SportResult.com
Rules for classification: 1) points; 2) head-to-head points; 3) head-to-head goal difference; 4) head-to-head number of goals scored; 5) goal difference.

26 July 2015; 10:50	Report	Kazakhstan	7–14	Spain	Kazan; Attendance: 993; Referees: Anne Grandin (FRA), Ni Shi Wei (CHN)
26 July 2015; 10:50	Report	Score by quarters: 0–4, 2–5, 1–1, 4–4			Kazan; Attendance: 993; Referees: Anne Grandin (FRA), Ni Shi Wei (CHN)
26 July 2015; 10:50	Report	Mirshina 3	Goals	Pareja 5	Kazan; Attendance: 993; Referees: Anne Grandin (FRA), Ni Shi Wei (CHN)

28 July 2015; 20:10	Report	Spain	23–2	New Zealand	Kazan; Attendance: 300; Referees: Ursula Wengenroth (SUI), Fabio Toffoli (BRA)
28 July 2015; 20:10	Report	Score by quarters: 3–0, 7–1, 5–1, 8–0			Kazan; Attendance: 300; Referees: Ursula Wengenroth (SUI), Fabio Toffoli (BRA)
28 July 2015; 20:10	Report	Tarragó 6	Goals	D. Lewis, Lopes Da Silva 1	Kazan; Attendance: 300; Referees: Ursula Wengenroth (SUI), Fabio Toffoli (BRA)

30 July 2015; 13:30	Report	Canada	6–12	Spain	Kazan; Attendance: 321; Referees: György Kun (HUN), Mark Koganov (AZE)
30 July 2015; 13:30	Report	Score by quarters: 1–5, 2–4, 2–2, 1–1			Kazan; Attendance: 321; Referees: György Kun (HUN), Mark Koganov (AZE)
30 July 2015; 13:30	Report	M. Eggens 2	Goals	Pareja 3	Kazan; Attendance: 321; Referees: György Kun (HUN), Mark Koganov (AZE)

Quarterfinals

3 August 2015; 17:30	Report	Spain	5–8	United States	Kazan; Attendance: 1,460; Referees: Massimiliano Caputi (ITA), Georgios Stavridis (GRE)
3 August 2015; 17:30	Report	Score by quarters: 0–2, 2–3, 2–1, 1–2			Kazan; Attendance: 1,460; Referees: Massimiliano Caputi (ITA), Georgios Stavridis (GRE)
3 August 2015; 17:30	Report	Espar 2	Goals	Fattal, Neushul 2	Kazan; Attendance: 1,460; Referees: Massimiliano Caputi (ITA), Georgios Stavridis (GRE)

5th–8th place semifinals

5 August 2015; 15:30	Report	Spain	9–10	China	Kazan; Attendance: 297; Referees: Joseph Peila (USA), Joseph Peila (AUS)
5 August 2015; 15:30	Report	Score by quarters: 3–3, 2–1, 2–4, 2–2			Kazan; Attendance: 297; Referees: Joseph Peila (USA), Joseph Peila (AUS)
5 August 2015; 15:30	Report	Forca 3	Goals	Song Donglun, Zhao Zihan 4	Kazan; Attendance: 297; Referees: Joseph Peila (USA), Joseph Peila (AUS)

Seventh place game

7 August 2015; 14:00	Report	Spain	15–10	Russia	Kazan; Attendance: 1,336; Referees: Radoslaw Korzyna (POL), Nenad Peris (CRO)
7 August 2015; 14:00	Report	Score by quarters: 5–3, 3–4, 4–1, 3–2			Kazan; Attendance: 1,336; Referees: Radoslaw Korzyna (POL), Nenad Peris (CRO)
7 August 2015; 14:00	Report	Tarragó 4	Goals	Ivanova 3	Kazan; Attendance: 1,336; Referees: Radoslaw Korzyna (POL), Nenad Peris (CRO)
