= Slovenia at the 2012 Summer Olympics =

- IOC code: SLO
- NOC: Olympic Committee of Slovenia
- Website: www.olympic.si (in Slovene and English)

in London
- Competitors: 65 in 15 sports
- Flag bearers: Peter Kauzer (opening); Franka Anić (closing)
- Medals Ranked 42nd: Gold 1 Silver 1 Bronze 2 Total 4

Summer Olympics appearances (overview)
- 1992; 1996; 2000; 2004; 2008; 2012; 2016; 2020; 2024

Other related appearances
- Austria (1912); Yugoslavia (1920–1988)

Slovenia competed at the 2012 Summer Olympics in London, United Kingdom. This was the nation's sixth consecutive appearance at the Summer Olympics. The Olympic Committee of Slovenia (Slovene: Olimpijski komite Slovenije) sent the nation's third-largest delegation ever to the Games. A total of 65 athletes, 28 men and 37 women, competed in 15 sports. For the first time in its Olympic history, Slovenia was represented by more female than male athletes. Slalom kayaker and multiple-time world champion Peter Kauzer was the nation's flagbearer at the opening ceremony. The London Games also featured Slovenia's Olympic debut in triathlon.

The Slovenian team contained two Olympic medalists from the Beijing Olympics: hammer thrower and defending champion Primož Kozmus, and Finn sailor Vasilij Žbogar, who both competed at their fourth Olympics. Rifle shooter and former gold medalist Rajmond Debevec, the oldest athlete on the team at 49, became the first Slovenian to compete in eight Olympic Games (including two appearances for Socialist Federal Republic of Yugoslavia). Rower and four-time medalist Iztok Čop competed at his sixth Olympics, while Čop's rowing partner Luka Špik and butterfly swimmer Peter Mankoč both made their fifth Olympic appearances.

Slovenian athletes earned four medals in London: one gold, one silver, and two bronze. All of Slovenia's medal winners had already won medals at one or more previous Olympics.

== Medalists ==
Medal	Name	Sport	Event	Date
Gold	Urška Žolnir	Judo	Women's 63 kg	31 July
Silver	Primož Kozmus	Athletics	Men's hammer throw	5 August
Bronze	Iztok Čop; Luka Špik	Rowing	Men's double sculls	2 August
Bronze	Rajmond Debevec	Shooting	Men's 50 m rifle prone	3 August

== Archery ==
Slovenia qualified one archer.

Athlete	Event	Ranking round		Round of 64	Round of 32	Round of 16	Quarterfinals	Semifinals	Final / BM	
Athlete	Event	Score	Seed	Opposition Score	Opposition Score	Opposition Score	Opposition Score	Opposition Score	Opposition Score	Rank
Klemen Štrajhar	Men's individual	639	58	Dai Xx (CHN) (7); L 0–6	Did not advance					

== Athletics ==
Slovenian athletes achieved qualifying standards in the following athletics events (up to a maximum of 3 athletes in each event at the 'A' Standard, and 1 at the 'B' Standard):

Key

- Note–Ranks given for track events are within the athlete's heat only
- Q = Qualified for the next round
- q = Qualified for the next round as a fastest loser or, in field events, by position without achieving the qualifying target
- NR = National record
- N/A = Round not applicable for the event
- Bye = Athlete not required to compete in round

Men
Track & road events

Athlete	Event	Heat		Semifinal		Final	
Athlete	Event	Result	Rank	Result	Rank	Result	Rank
Primož Kobe	Marathon	—				2:19:28	46
Brent LaRue	400 m hurdles	49.38	4 q	49.45	3	Did not advance	

Field events

Athlete	Event	Qualification		Final	
Athlete	Event	Distance	Position	Distance	Position
Matija Kranjc	Javelin throw	72.63	40	Did not advance	
Primož Kozmus	Hammer throw	78.12	3 Q	79.36	2nd place, silver medalist(s)
Rožle Prezelj	High jump	2.21	=25	Did not advance	

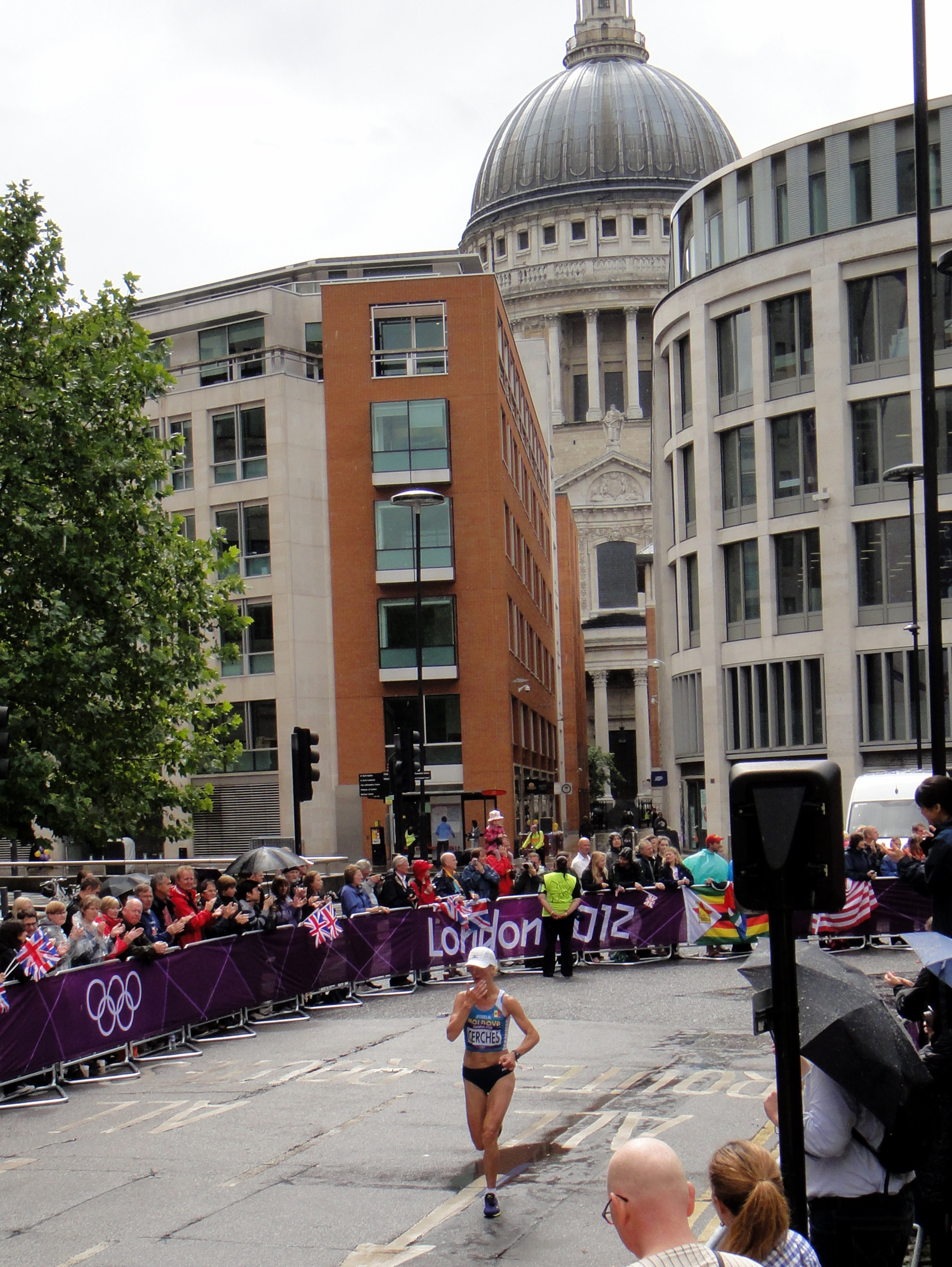
Žana Jereb at the Marathon

Women
Track & road events

Athlete	Event	Heat		Semifinal		Final	
Athlete	Event	Result	Rank	Result	Rank	Result	Rank
Žana Jereb	Marathon	—				2:42:50	88
Sonja Roman	1500 m	4:19.17	11	Did not advance			
Marina Tomić	100 m hurdles	13.10	5	Did not advance			

Field events

Athlete	Event	Qualification		Final	
Athlete	Event	Distance	Position	Distance	Position
Martina Ratej	Javelin throw	63.60	6 Q	61.62	7
Marija Šestak	Triple jump	14.16	12 q	13.98	11
Barbara Špiler	Hammer throw	67.21	29	Did not advance	
Tina Šutej	Pole vault	4.25	19	Did not advance	

== Badminton ==
Athlete	Event	Group Stage			Elimination	Quarterfinal	Semifinal	Final / BM	
Athlete	Event	Opposition Score	Opposition Score	Rank	Opposition Score	Opposition Score	Opposition Score	Opposition Score	Rank
Maja Tvrdy	Women's singles	Sato (JPN); L 20–22, 18–21	Egelstaff (GBR); L 15–21, 10–21	3	Did not advance				

== Canoeing ==
=== Slalom ===
Slovenia qualified boats for all slalom events.

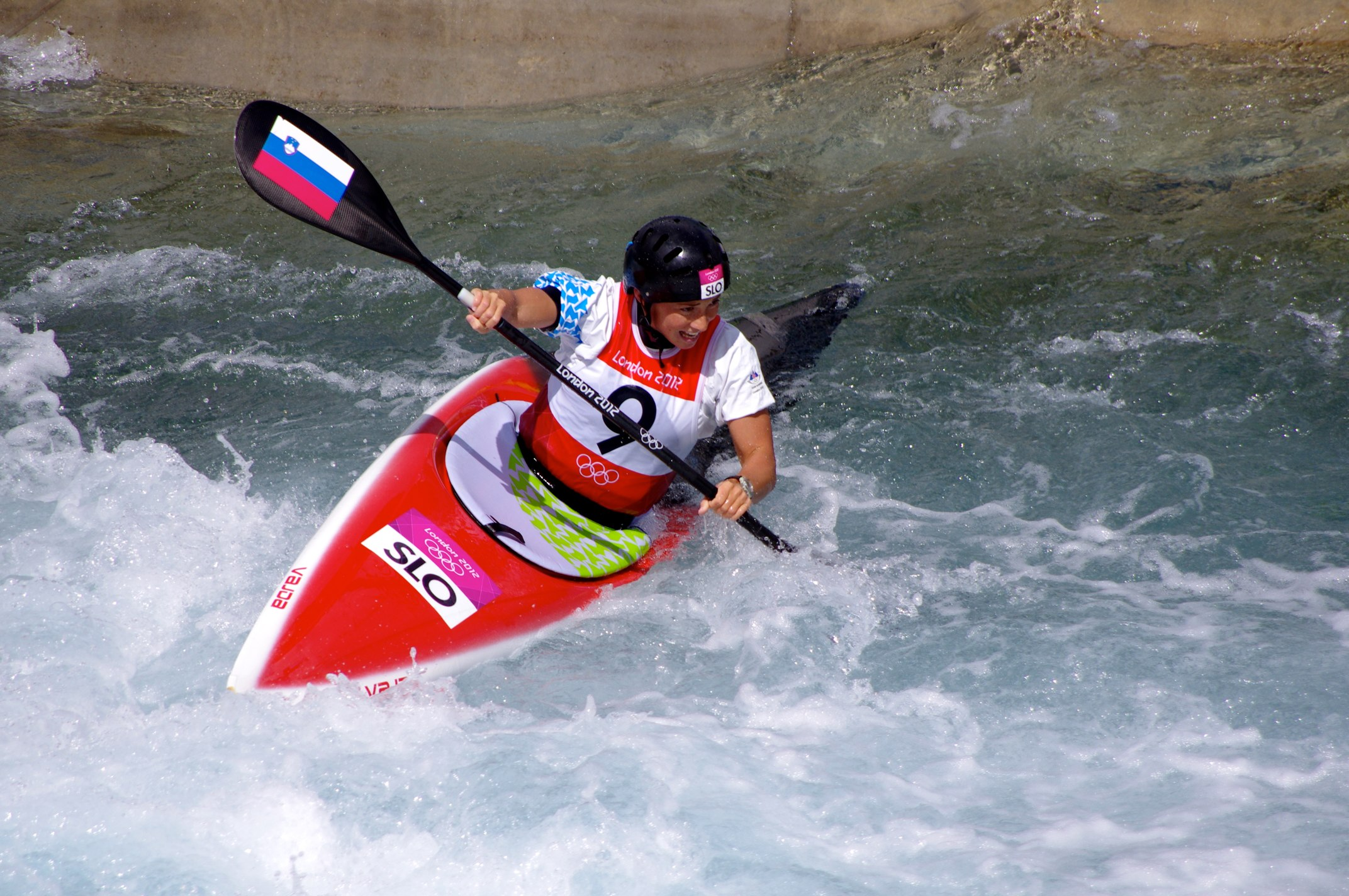
Eva Terčelj in K-1 semifinal

Athlete	Event	Preliminary						Semifinal		Final	
Athlete	Event	Run 1	Rank	Run 2	Rank	Best	Rank	Time	Rank	Time	Rank
Peter Kauzer	Men's K-1	90.98	9	88.10	4	88.10	5 Q	96.02	1 Q	101.01	6
Benjamin Savšek	Men's C-1	90.83	1	203.42	15	90.83	2 Q	99.92	2 Q	219.95	8
Luka Božič; Sašo Taljat	Men's C-2	102.82	4	101.08	4	101.08	6 Q	113.50	8	Did not advance	
Eva Terčelj	Women's K-1	107.17	7	107.57	9	107.17	11 Q	117.36	13	Did not advance	

=== Sprint ===
Athlete	Event	Heats		Semifinals		Final	
Athlete	Event	Time	Rank	Time	Rank	Time	Rank
Špela Ponomarenko	Women's K-1 200 m	42.884	4 Q	42.209	5 FB	44.953	10
Špela Ponomarenko	Women's K-1 500 m	2:01.520	5 Q	1:53.341	5 FB	1:53.718	12

Qualification Legend: FA = Qualify to final (medal); FB = Qualify to final B (non-medal)

== Cycling ==
Slovenia qualified athletes in the following events:

=== Road ===
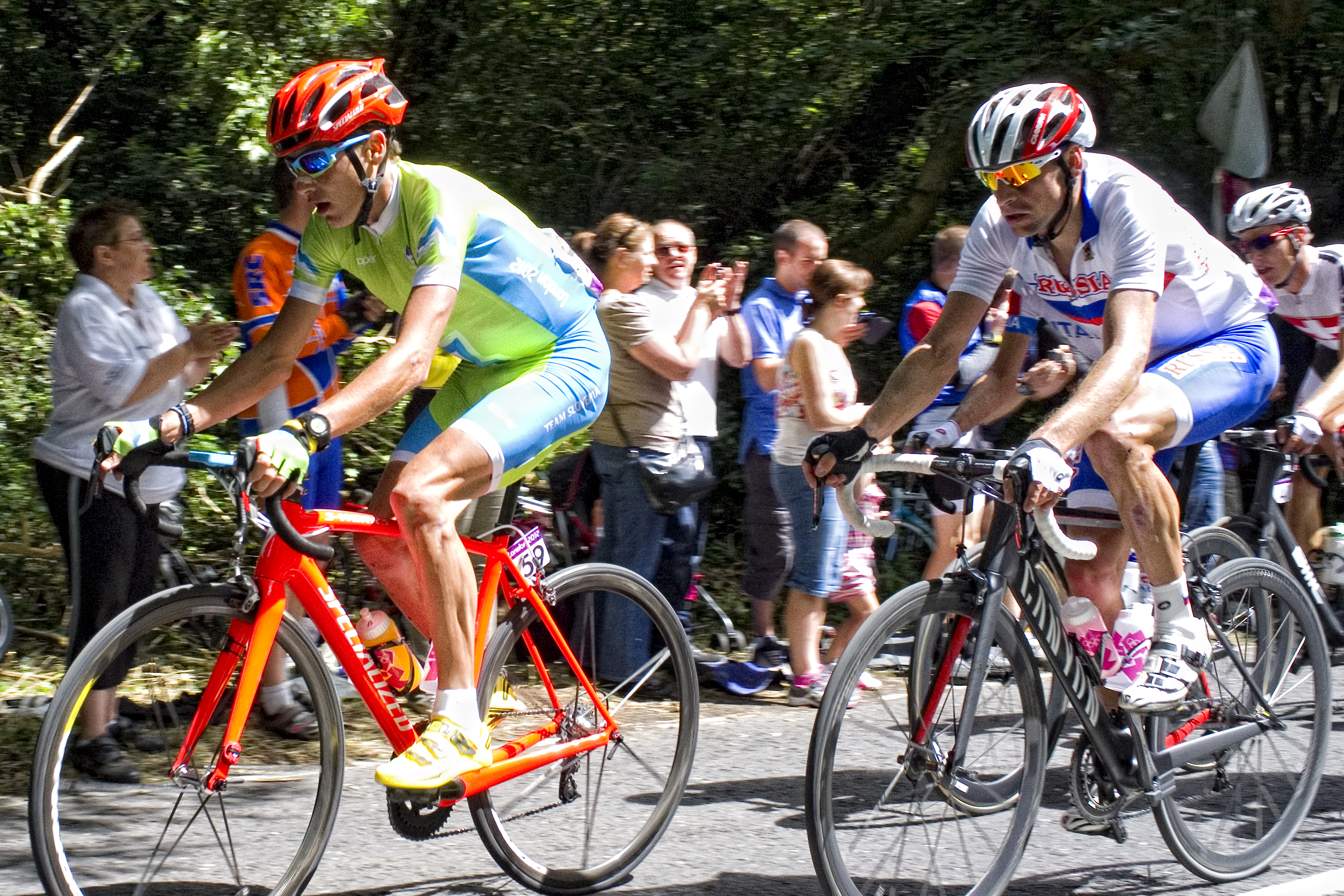
Janez Brajkovič at the road race

Athlete	Event	Time	Rank
Janez Brajkovič	Men's road race	5:46:05	21
Janez Brajkovič	Men's time trial	54:09.72	10
Borut Božič	Men's road race	5:46:37	46
Grega Bole	Men's road race	5:46:37	79
Polona Batagelj	Women's road race	3:35:56	22

=== Mountain biking ===
Athlete	Event	Time	Rank
Blaža Klemenčič	Women's cross-country	1:39:42	23
Tanja Žakelj	Women's cross-country	1:34:41	10

== Gymnastics ==
=== Artistic ===
Women

Athlete	Event	Qualification						Final					
Athlete	Event	Apparatus				Total	Rank	Apparatus				Total	Rank
Athlete	Event	F	V	UB	BB	Total	Rank	F	V	UB	BB	Total	Rank
Saša Golob	All-around	13.500	0.000	12.066	13.033	38.599	60	Did not advance					

== Judo ==
Men

Athlete	Event	Round of 64	Round of 32	Round of 16	Quarterfinals	Semifinals	Repechage	Final / BM	
Athlete	Event	Opposition Result	Opposition Result	Opposition Result	Opposition Result	Opposition Result	Opposition Result	Opposition Result	Rank
Rok Drakšič	−66 kg	Bye	Valderrama (VEN); W 0010–0001	Ungvári (HUN); L 0002–0011	Did not advance				
Aljaž Sedej	−81 kg	Bye	Stevens (USA); L 0002–1010	Did not advance					
Matjaž Ceraj	+100 kg	—	Bondarenko (UKR); W 0021–0002	Kim S-M (KOR); L 0001–0020	Did not advance				

Women

Athlete	Event	Round of 32	Round of 16	Quarterfinals	Semifinals	Repechage	Final / BM	
Athlete	Event	Opposition Result	Opposition Result	Opposition Result	Opposition Result	Opposition Result	Opposition Result	Rank
Vesna Đukić	−57 kg	Matsumoto (JPN); L 0002–0011	Did not advance					
Urška Žolnir	−63 kg	Malzahn (GER); W 0000–1100	García (ECU); W 1000–0001	Schlesinger (ISR); W 1100–0000	Tsedevsuren (MGL); W 1000–0000	Bye	Xu L (CHN); W 0100–0011	1st place, gold medalist(s)
Raša Sraka	−70 kg	Bye	Blanco (ESP); W 1102–0001	Hwang Y-S (KOR); L 1000–0001	Did not advance	Alvear (COL); L 1000–0001	Did not advance	7
Anamari Velenšek	−78 kg	Pogorzelec (POL); L 0000–0001	Did not advance					
Lucija Polavder	+78 kg	Bye	Bryant (GBR); L 0000–0011	Did not advance				

== Rowing ==
Slovenia qualified the following boats:

Men

Athlete	Event	Heats		Repechage		Semifinals		Final	
Athlete	Event	Time	Rank	Time	Rank	Time	Rank	Time	Rank
Iztok Čop; Luka Špik	Double sculls	6:17.78	=2 SA/B	Bye		6:19.97	1 FA	6:34.35	3rd place, bronze medalist(s)

Qualification Legend: FA=Final A (medal); FB=Final B (non-medal); FC=Final C (non-medal); FD=Final D (non-medal); FE=Final E (non-medal); FF=Final F (non-medal); SA/B=Semifinals A/B; SC/D=Semifinals C/D; SE/F=Semifinals E/F; QF=Quarterfinals; R=Repechage

== Sailing ==
Slovenia qualified one boat for each of the following events:

Men

Athlete	Event	Race											Net points	Final rank
Athlete	Event	1	2	3	4	5	6	7	8	9	10	M*	Net points	Final rank
Karlo Hmeljak	Laser	23	30	18	33	35	31	~~DNF~~	25	27	32	EL	253	31
Vasilij Žbogar	Finn	8	6	5	3	8	5	~~9~~	6	2	6	14	63	6

Women

Athlete	Event	Race											Net points	Final rank
Athlete	Event	1	2	3	4	5	6	7	8	9	10	M*	Net points	Final rank
Teja Černe; Tina Mrak	470	12	9	12	15	~~17~~	17	17	14	16	16	EL	127	18

M = Medal race; EL = Eliminated – did not advance into the medal race

== Shooting ==
Slovenia ensured berths in the following events:

Men

Athlete	Event	Qualification		Final	
Athlete	Event	Points	Rank	Points	Rank
Rajmond Debevec	50 m rifle 3 positions	1161	27	Did not advance	
Rajmond Debevec	50 m rifle prone	596	3 Q	701.0	3rd place, bronze medalist(s)
Boštjan Maček	Trap	121	7	Did not advance	

Women

Athlete	Event	Qualification		Final	
Athlete	Event	Points	Rank	Points	Rank
Živa Dvoršak	50 m rifle 3 positions	574	36	Did not advance	
Živa Dvoršak	10 m air rifle	396	11	Did not advance	

== Swimming ==
Slovenian swimmers achieved qualifying standards in the following events (up to a maximum of two swimmers in each event at the Olympic Qualifying Time (OQT), and 1 at the Olympic Selection Time (OST)):

Men

Athlete	Event	Heat		Semifinal		Final	
Athlete	Event	Time	Rank	Time	Rank	Time	Rank
Damir Dugonjič	100 m breaststroke	1:00.77	18	Did not advance			
Peter Mankoč	100 m butterfly	52.44	19	Did not advance			
Robert Žbogar	200 m butterfly	1:58.99	24	Did not advance			

Women

Athlete	Event	Heat		Semifinal		Final	
Athlete	Event	Time	Rank	Time	Rank	Time	Rank
Anja Čarman	100 m backstroke	1:02.68	34	Did not advance			
Anja Čarman	200 m backstroke	2:13.01	25	Did not advance			
Nastja Govejšek	100 m freestyle	56.21	28	Did not advance			
Sara Isaković	200 m freestyle	1:58.96	16 Q	1:58.47	14	Did not advance	
Sara Isaković	100 m butterfly	59.86	31	Did not advance			
Anja Klinar	200 m butterfly	2:09.24	14 Q	2:07.84	11	Did not advance	
Anja Klinar	400 m individual medley	4:38.20	10	—		Did not advance	
Tjaša Oder	800 m freestyle	8:41.82	25	—		Did not advance	
Mojca Sagmeister	400 m freestyle	4:21.55	32	—		Did not advance	
Tanja Šmid	200 m breaststroke	2:32.19	33	Did not advance			
Tjaša Vozel	100 m breaststroke	1:09.63	30	Did not advance			
Urša Bežan; Nastja Govejšek; Sara Isaković; Tjaša Oder; Mojca Sagmeister	4 × 200 m freestyle relay	8:04.69	14	—		Did not advance	

== Table tennis ==
Slovenia qualified one athlete for singles table tennis.

Athlete	Event	Preliminary round	Round 1	Round 2	Round 3	Round 4	Quarterfinals	Semifinals	Final / BM	
Athlete	Event	Opposition Result	Opposition Result	Opposition Result	Opposition Result	Opposition Result	Opposition Result	Opposition Result	Opposition Result	Rank
Bojan Tokič	Men's singles	Bye		Liu S (ARG); W 4–3	Gao N (SIN); L 0–4	Did not advance				

== Taekwondo ==
Slovenia qualified 3 athletes.

Athlete	Event	Round of 16	Quarterfinals	Semifinals	Repechage	Bronze Medal	Final	
Athlete	Event	Opposition Result	Opposition Result	Opposition Result	Opposition Result	Opposition Result	Opposition Result	Rank
Ivan Trajkovič	Men's +80 kg	Cha D-M (KOR); L 4–9	Did not advance					
Franka Anić	Women's −67 kg	Aytmukhambetova (KAZ); W 15–11	Sergerie (CAN); W 10–5	Hwang K-S (KOR); L 0–7	Bye	McPherson (USA); L 3–8	Did not advance	5
Nuša Rajher	Women's +67 kg	Yergeshova (KAZ); W 17–16 SDP	Baryshnikova (RUS); L 9–11	Did not advance				

== Tennis ==
Slovenia qualified 4 players.

Athlete	Event	Round of 64	Round of 32	Round of 16	Quarterfinals	Semifinals	Final / BM	
Athlete	Event	Opposition Score	Opposition Score	Opposition Score	Opposition Score	Opposition Score	Opposition Score	Rank
Blaž Kavčič	Men's singles	Vardhan (IND); W 6–3, 6–2	Ferrer (ESP); L 2–6, 2–6	Did not advance				
Polona Hercog	Women's singles	Martínez (ESP); L 2–6, 4–6	Did not advance					
Andreja Klepač; Katarina Srebotnik	Women's doubles	—	Chakhnashvili / Tatishvili (GEO); W 7–6^{(7–0)}, 6–3, 2–6	Errani / Vinci (ITA); L 5–7, 6–4, 4–6	Did not advance			

== Triathlon ==
Athlete	Event	Swim (1.5 km)	Trans 1	Bike (40 km)	Trans 2	Run (10 km)	Total Time	Rank
Mateja Šimic	Women's	19:31	0:43	1:07:11	0:34	37:36	2:05:35	37
