= 2012 FINA World Swimming Championships (25 m) – Women's 400 metre freestyle =

Women's 400m Freestyle at the 2012 Short Course Worlds
- Dates: 14 December (heats and final)
- Winning time: 4:01.18

Medalists
gold medal	Melanie Costa	Spain
silver medal	Chloe Sutton	United States
bronze medal	Lauren Boyle	New Zealand

The women's 400 metre freestyle event at the 11th FINA World Swimming Championships (25m) took place 14 December 2012 at the Sinan Erdem Dome.

== Records ==
Prior to this competition, the existing world and championship records were as follows.

	Name	Nation	Time	Location	Date
World record	Camille Muffat	France	3:54.85	Chartres	24 November 2012
Championship record	Katie Hoff	United States	3:57.07	Dubai	17 December 2010

No new records were set during this competition.

== Results ==
=== Heats ===
Rank	Heat	Lane	Name	Time	Notes
1	3	5	Katinka Hosszú (HUN)	4:03.49	Q
2	4	4	Chloe Sutton (USA)	4:04.16	Q
3	4	5	Elena Sokolova (RUS)	4:04.37	Q
4	3	4	Melanie Costa (ESP)	4:04.68	Q
5	5	3	Lauren Boyle (NZL)	4:04.83	Q
6	3	3	Angie Bainbridge (AUS)	4:04.94	Q
7	4	3	Erika Villaécija García (ESP)	4:05.04	Q
8	1	3	Zhou Lili (CHN)	4:05.11	Q
9	1	4	Jazmin Carlin (GBR)	4:05.13	
10	3	6	Alice Nesti (ITA)	4:05.55	
11	5	4	Lotte Friis (DEN)	4:05.67	
12	5	5	Allison Schmitt (USA)	4:05.98	
13	5	6	Diletta Carli (ITA)	4:06.38	
14	1	5	Xu Danlu (CHN)	4:06.83	
15	5	0	Emu Higuchi (JPN)	4:07.46	
16	3	2	Ellie Faulkner (GBR)	4:07.72	
17	4	8	Samantha Arévalo (ECU)	4:08.64	NR
18	4	1	Ksenia Yuskova (RUS)	4:09.53	
19	3	7	Julia Hassler (LIE)	4:10.08	
20	3	1	Asami Chida (JPN)	4:10.78	
21	4	2	Urša Bežan (SLO)	4:11.21	
22	5	7	Mojca Sagmeister (SLO)	4:12.74	
23	4	7	Heather MacLean (CAN)	4:12.99	
24	4	6	Nina Rangelova (BUL)	4:13.49	
25	5	8	Kyna Pereira (RSA)	4:15.37	
26	3	8	Virginia Bardach (ARG)	4:16.78	
27	2	8	Lani Cabrera (BAR)	4:20.78	NR
28	4	0	Andrea Cedrón (PER)	4:23.87	
29	3	0	Daniela Miyahara (PER)	4:25.30	
30	2	3	Karen Torrez (BOL)	4:25.70	NR
31	5	9	Maria Lopez Nery Huerta (PAR)	4:29.51	NR
32	4	9	Fatima Eugenia Flores (ESA)	4:31.34	
33	3	9	Machiko Suharmee Raheem (SRI)	4:36.10	
34	2	5	Monica Saili (SAM)	4:37.32	
35	2	4	Sariyah Sherry (BAR)	4:37.33	
36	2	2	Tieri Erasito (FIJ)	4:45.17	
37	2	6	Yusra Mardini (SYR)	4:56.66	
38	2	7	Charissa Sofia Panuve (TGA)	5:15.87	
39	2	1	Mahnoor Maqsood (PAK)	5:33.66	
	5	1	Céline Bertrand (SWE)	DNS	
	5	2	Jessica Pengelly (RSA)	DNS	

=== Final ===
The final was held at 20:25.

Rank	Lane	Name	Nationality	Time	Notes
1st place, gold medalist(s)	3	Melanie Costa	Spain	4:01.18	
2nd place, silver medalist(s)	4	Chloe Sutton	United States	4:01.20	
3rd place, bronze medalist(s)	6	Lauren Boyle	New Zealand	4:01.24	NR
4	5	Elena Sokolova	Russia	4:01.49	NR
5	8	Jazmin Carlin	Great Britain	4:02.45	
6	2	Angie Bainbridge	Australia	4:04.07	
7	1	Zhou Lili	China	4:04.87	
8	7	Erika Villaécija García	Spain	4:05.78	
