= Swimming at the 2012 European Aquatics Championships – Women's 4 × 200 metre freestyle relay =

Women's 4 × 200 metre freestyle relay at the 2012 European Aquatics Championships
- Dates: May 24, 2012 (heats and final)
- Competitors: 44 from 10 nations
- Winning time: 7:52.90

Medalists
gold medal	Alice Mizzau; Alice Nesti; Diletta Carli; Federica Pellegrini	Italy
silver medal	Zsuzsanna Jakabos; Evelyn Verrasztó; Ágnes Mutina; Katinka Hosszú	Hungary
bronze medal	Sara Isakovič; Anja Klinar; Ursa Bezan; Mojca Sagmeister	Slovenia

The women's 4 × 200 metre freestyle relay competition of the swimming events at the 2012 European Aquatics Championships took place on May 24. The heats and final took place on May 24.

== Records ==
Prior to the competition, the existing world, European and championship records were as follows.

	Nation	Time	Location	Date
World record	China	7:42.08	Rome	July 30, 2009
European record	Great Britain	7:45.51	Rome	July 30, 2009
Championship record	Germany	7:50.82	Budapest	August 3, 2006

== Results ==
=== Heats ===
10 nations participated in 2 heats.

Rank	Heat	Lane	Name	Nationality	Time	Notes
1	1	5	Zsuzsanna Jakabos; Evelyn Verrasztó; Ágnes Mutina; Katinka Hosszú	Hungary	8:05.83	Q
2	2	4	Mojca Sagmeister; Ursa Bezan; Anja Klinar; Sara Isakovič	Slovenia	8:06.10	Q
3	1	2	Patricia Castro Ortega; Lydia Morant Varo; Judit Ignacio Sorribes; Mireia Belmonte García	Spain	8:06.39	Q
4	1	4	Silke Lippok; Daniela Schreiber; Alexandra Wenk; Theresa Michalak	Germany	8:06.83	Q
5	2	6	Martina de Memme; Alice Nesti; Diletta Carli; Erica Buratto	Italy	8:07.69	Q
6	1	3	Jördis Steinegger; Lisa Zaiser; Eva Chaves-Diaz; Uschi Halbreiner	Austria	8:08.80	Q
7	2	2	Sycerika McMahon; Melanie Nocher; Nuala Murphy; Bethany Carson	Ireland	8:13.30	Q
8	2	5	Valeriya Podlesna; Darya Stepanyuk; Iryna Glavnyk; Ganna Dzerkal	Ukraine	8:17.33	Q
9	2	3	Eygló Ósk Gústafsdóttir; Eva Hannesdóttir; Johanna Gerda Gustafsdottir; Sarah Blake Bateman	Iceland	8:25.78	NR
10	1	6	Cecilie Johannessen; Veronica Orheim Bjørlykke; Susann Bjørnsen; Emilie Loevberg	Norway	8:26.35	NR

=== Final ===
The final was held at 18:30.

Rank	Lane	Name	Nationality	Time	Notes
1st place, gold medalist(s)	2	Alice Mizzau; Alice Nesti; Diletta Carli; Federica Pellegrini	Italy	7:52.90	
2nd place, silver medalist(s)	4	Zsuzsanna Jakabos; Evelyn Verrasztó; Ágnes Mutina; Katinka Hosszú	Hungary	7:54.70	
3rd place, bronze medalist(s)	5	Sara Isakovič; Anja Klinar; Ursa Bezan; Mojca Sagmeister	Slovenia	7:59.73	NR
4	6	Silke Lippok; Theresa Michalak; Alexandra Wenk; Daniela Schreiber	Germany	8:00.55	
5	7	Jördis Steinegger; Lisa Zaiser; Birgit Koschischek; Uschi Halbreiner	Austria	8:09.13	
6	1	Sycerika McMahon; Melanie Nocher; Bethany Carson; Nuala Murphy	Ireland	8:09.15	
7	8	Iryna Glavnyk; Ganna Dzerkal; Darya Stepanyuk; Daryna Zevina	Ukraine	8:11.44	
	3	Melania Costa Schmid; Patricia Castro Ortega; Lydia Morant Varo; Mireia Belmonte García	Spain		DSQ
