= Kim Ga-eul =

South Korean swimmer (born 1997)

Kim Ga-Eul
Personal information
- Nationality: South Korea
- Born: 17 January 1997 (age 29) Pohang, South Korea
- Height: 1.60 m (5 ft 3 in)
- Weight: 52 kg (115 lb)

Sport
- Sport: Swimming
- Strokes: Freestyle
- Club: Gyeongbuk Middle School

Kim Ga-Eul (Korean: 김가을; born January 17, 1997, in Pohang) is a South Korean swimmer, who specialized in long-distance freestyle events. She is a finalist in the 800 m freestyle at the 2010 Asian Games in Guangzhou.

Kim qualified for the women's 400 m freestyle, as South Korea's youngest swimmer (aged 15), at the 2012 Summer Olympics in London, by eclipsing a FINA B-standard entry time of 4:15.01 from the Dong-A Swimming Tournament in Ulsan. She challenged seven other swimmers on the second heat, including three-time Olympian Kristel Köbrich of Chile. Kim finished the race in last place by nearly 25 seconds behind Singapore's Lynette Lim, posting the second-slowest time of 4:43.46. Kim failed to advance to the final, as she placed thirty-fourth overall in the preliminary heats.
