= Swimming at the 2012 Summer Olympics – Women's 400 metre freestyle =

Women's 400 metre freestyle at the Games of the XXX Olympiad
- Venue: London Aquatics Centre
- Date: July 29, 2012 (heats & final)
- Competitors: 35 from 27 nations
- Winning time: 4:01.45 OR

Medalists
1st place, gold medalist(s)		Camille Muffat	France
2nd place, silver medalist(s)		Allison Schmitt	United States
3rd place, bronze medalist(s)		Rebecca Adlington	Great Britain

The women's 400 metre freestyle event at the 2012 Summer Olympics took place on 29 July at the London Aquatics Centre in London, United Kingdom.

France's Camille Muffat held off a sprint duel from a hard-charging American Allison Schmitt with every stroke on the final stretch to capture the event's second Olympic title for her nation, since Laure Manaudou topped the podium in 2004. She maintained her powerful lead from the start to edge out Schmitt by 0.32 seconds for the gold medal and a new Olympic record in 4:01.45. Meanwhile, Schmitt could not catch Muffat on a head-to-head duel to finish with an American record of 4:01.77 in the process of winning silver. Great Britain's Rebecca Adlington struggled through the race in her Olympic title defense, but brought out a raucous cheer from the home crowd to earn the bronze in 4:03.01.

Denmark's Lotte Friis finished off the podium with a fourth-place time and a national record in 4:03.98, while Italy's Federica Pellegrini, the reigning world record holder, faded to fifth in 4:04.50. Muffat's teammate Coralie Balmy (4:05.95), Canada's Brittany MacLean (4:06.24) and New Zealand's Lauren Boyle (4:06.25) rounded out the field.

== Records ==
Prior to this competition, the existing world and Olympic records were as follows.

World record	Federica Pellegrini (ITA)	3:59.15	Rome, Italy	26 July 2009
Olympic record	Federica Pellegrini (ITA)	4:02.19	Beijing, China	10 August 2008

The following records were established during the competition:

Date	Event	Name	Nationality	Time	Record
July 29	Final	Camille Muffat	France	4:01.45	OR

== Results ==
=== Heats ===
Rank	Heat	Lane	Name	Nationality	Time	Notes
1	5	4	Camille Muffat	France	4:03.29	Q
2	5	5	Allison Schmitt	United States	4:03.31	Q
3	4	6	Coralie Balmy	France	4:03.56	Q
4	5	2	Lauren Boyle	New Zealand	4:03.63	Q, NR
5	5	6	Lotte Friis	Denmark	4:04.22	Q, NR
6	4	2	Brittany MacLean	Canada	4:05.06	Q, NR
7	4	4	Federica Pellegrini	Italy	4:05.30	Q
8	3	4	Rebecca Adlington	Great Britain	4:05.75	Q
9	5	7	Melania Costa Schmid	Spain	4:06.75	
10	3	5	Chloe Sutton	United States	4:07.07	
11	4	5	Kylie Palmer	Australia	4:07.27	
12	5	3	Bronte Barratt	Australia	4:07.99	
13	3	6	Mireia Belmonte García	Spain	4:08.23	
14	4	3	Shao Yiwen	China	4:08.41	
15	4	1	Andreina Pinto	Venezuela	4:08.45	NR
16	3	7	Éva Risztov	Hungary	4:09.08	
17	5	1	Boglárka Kapás	Hungary	4:10.01	
18	4	7	Savannah King	Canada	4:10.93	
19	3	3	Li Xuanxu	China	4:10.95	
20	3	1	Camelia Potec	Romania	4:11.43	
21	3	2	Joanne Jackson	Great Britain	4:11.50	
22	3	8	Wendy Trott	South Africa	4:11.63	
23	2	3	Nina Rangelova	Bulgaria	4:11.71	NR
24	2	5	Kristel Kobrich	Chile	4:12.02	
25	5	8	Yelena Sokolova	Russia	4:12.19	
26	2	4	Aya Takano	Japan	4:12.33	
27	2	2	Julia Hassler	Liechtenstein	4:12.99	NR
28	2	6	Susana Escobar	Mexico	4:14.78	
29	2	8	Natthanan Junkrajang	Thailand	4:16.45	
30	2	1	Lynette Lim	Singapore	4:18.64	
31	4	8	Grainne Murphy	Ireland	4:19.07	
32	1	4	Mojca Sagmeister	Slovenia	4:21.55	
33	1	5	Andrea Cedron	Peru	4:24.18	
34	2	7	Kim Ga-eul	South Korea	4:43.46	
35	1	3	Jennet Sariyeva	Turkmenistan	5:40.29	NR

=== Final ===
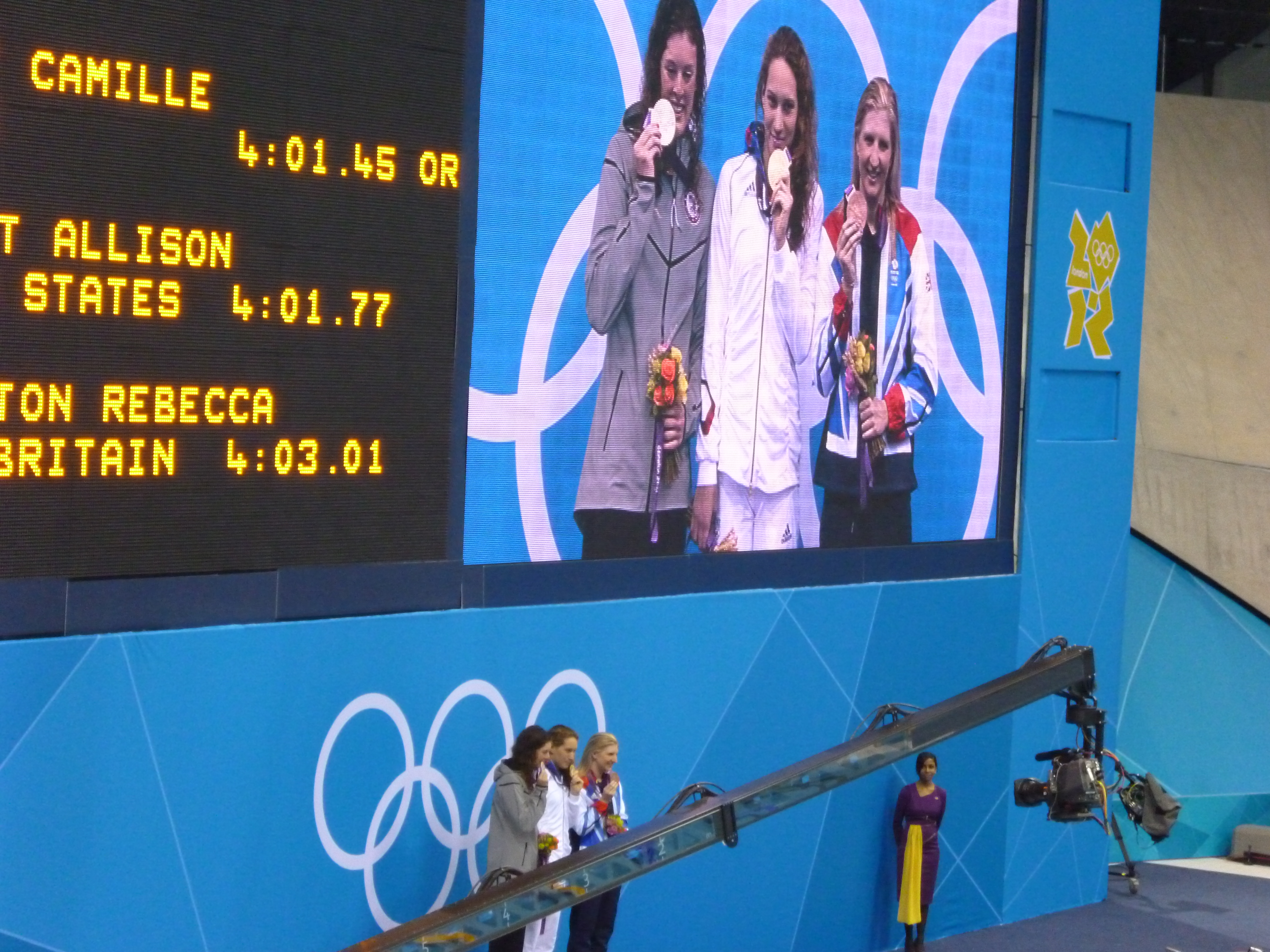
Podium for the 400m freestyle. L-R: Allison Schmitt (silver), Camille Muffat (gold) and Rebecca Adlington (bronze).

Rank	Lane	Name	Nationality	Time	Notes
1st place, gold medalist(s)	4	Camille Muffat	France	4:01.45	OR
2nd place, silver medalist(s)	5	Allison Schmitt	United States	4:01.77	AM
3rd place, bronze medalist(s)	8	Rebecca Adlington	Great Britain	4:03.01	
4	2	Lotte Friis	Denmark	4:03.98	NR
5	1	Federica Pellegrini	Italy	4:04.50	
6	3	Coralie Balmy	France	4:05.95	
7	7	Brittany MacLean	Canada	4:06.24	
8	6	Lauren Boyle	New Zealand	4:06.25	
