= Sara Isaković =

Slovenian swimmer (born 1988)

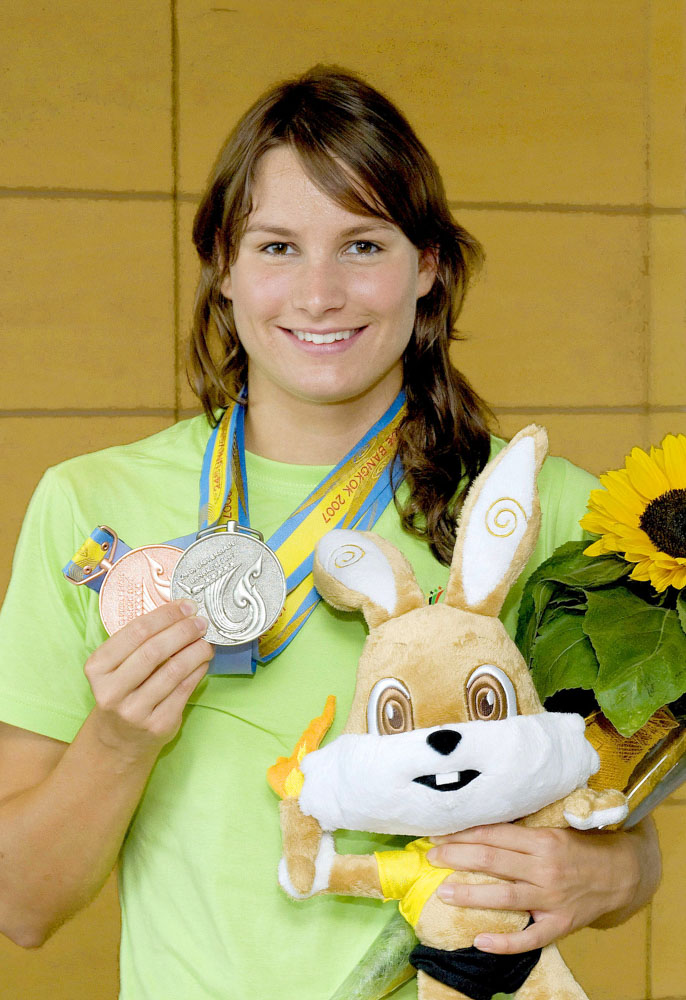
- Sara Isaković (2007 Summer Universiade)

Personal information
- Full name: Sara Isaković
- Nationality: Slovenia
- Born: 9 June 1988 (age 38) Bled, Slovenia, Yugoslavia
- Height: 1.75 m (5 ft 9 in)
- Weight: 60 kg (132 lb)

Sport
- Sport: Swimming
- Strokes: Freestyle
- Club: Plavalni Klub Radovljica
- College team: University of California, Berkeley
Medal record
Women's swimming
Representing Slovenia
Olympic Games
Silver medal – second place	2008 Beijing	200 m freestyle
European Championships (LC)
Gold medal – first place	2008 Eindhoven	200 m freestyle
Bronze medal – third place	2012 Debrecen	4 × 200 m freestyle
Mediterranean Games
Silver medal – second place	2005 Almería	200 m freestyle
Silver medal – second place	2005 Almería	400 m freestyle

Sara Isaković (born 9 June 1988) is a retired Slovenian swimmer. At the 2008 Beijing Olympics, aged 20, she placed 2nd in the 200 m freestyle with the time of 1:54.97, becoming the second woman ever (behind Federica Pellegrini) to break the 1 min 55 sec mark. It is still, to this day, the only swimming Olympic medal won for Slovenia. Isaković competed for Slovenia at the 2004 Summer Olympics in Athens, the 2008 Summer Olympics in Beijing, and the 2012 Summer Olympics in London.

== Early life ==
Being raised by a Slovenian mother and Serbian father, the family together with her twin brother Gal traveled all around the world due to her father's profession (Pilot/Examiner on Emirates B777). This finally led them to settle in Dubai, where Sara spent most of her childhood. Growing up she attended international schools, with the dream being to one day pursue studies in the U.S. where she could combine both athletics and academics at a world-class level.

== College career ==
After the 2008 Beijing Olympics, she moved to Berkeley, California, where she attended University of California Berkeley and represented the Cal Women's swim team, under the leadership of Teri McKeever, during her college years. In her four years of being a student-athlete, she won three National Team Titles and individually won the 100 butterfly at NCAA's during her Senior year at Cal. Isaković graduated with a degree in Psychology, in May 2013. Isaković moved to Dubai, where she is building her career in performance psychology and helping performers of all types achieve their maximum potential.

== Career achievements ==
2004- 2x European Junior Champion (Lisbon)

2004- Youngest member of the Athens Slovenian Olympic Team, at the age of 16.

2005- 2 Silver medals at Almeria, Spain, Mediterranean Games.

2005- First Slovenian woman to final at World Swimming Championships, in Montreal. (5th place 200 freestyle)

2007- 7th place in 200 butterfly at Melbourne World Championships

2008- First woman in Slovenian swimming to win a European Championships title- 200 freestyle

2008- Silver Medal at Beijing Olympics

2009- Semi-finalist at World Championships in Rome

2010- Gold medal at University Games, Belgrade- 200 freestyle, Finalist at European Championships

2011- Semi-finalist at World Championships in Shanghai- 200 freestyle

2012- Bronze medalist at European Championships, Debrecen- 4x200 freestyle relay

2012- Semi-finalist at London Olympic Games- 200 freestyle
