= Margalida Crespí =

Spanish synchronized swimmer

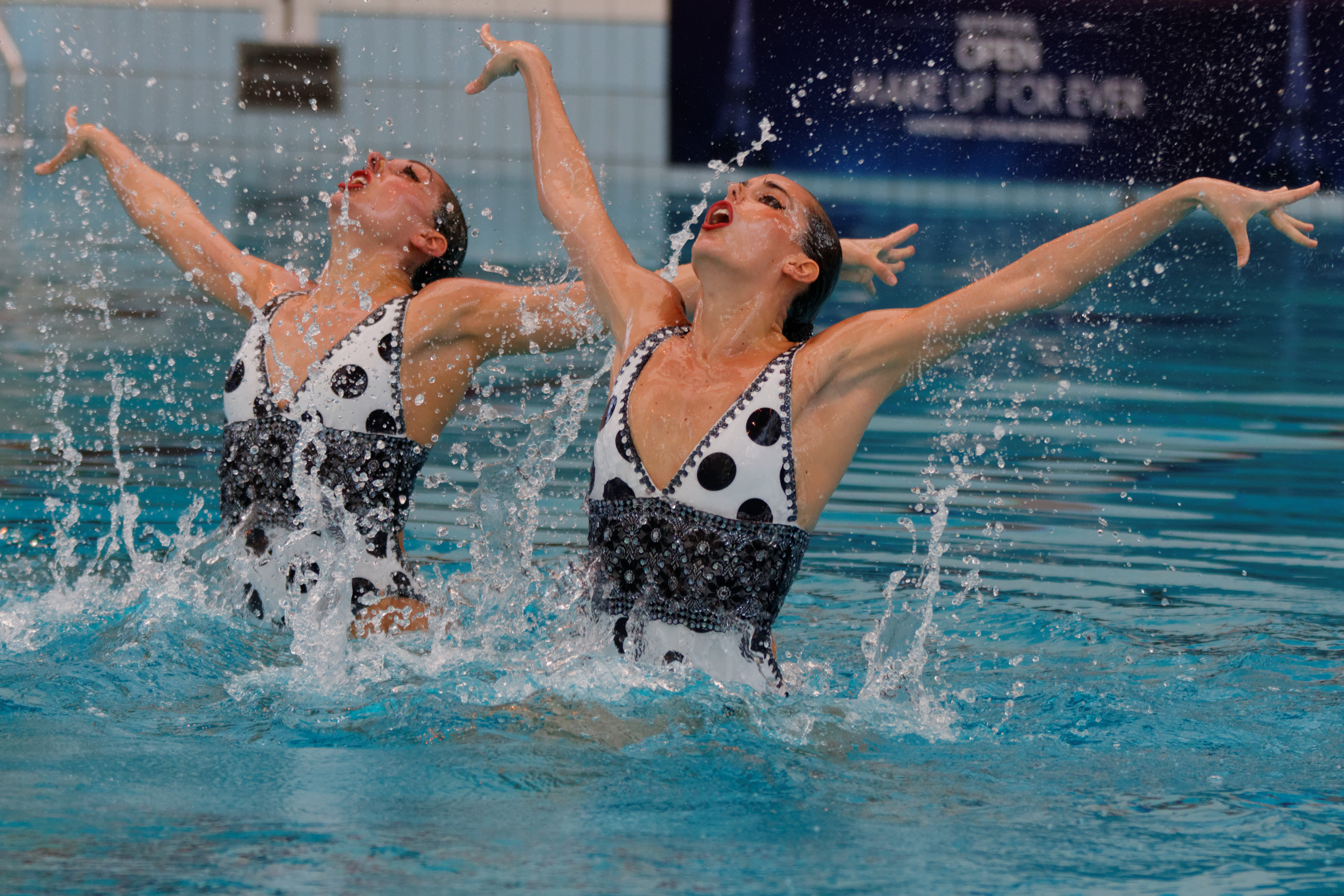
- Crespí and Ona Carbonell in March 2013

Personal information
- Born: August 15, 1990 (age 35) Palma de Mallorca, Baleriac Islands, Spain

Sport
- Sport: Synchronised swimming
Medal record
Representing Spain
Olympic Games
Bronze medal – third place	2012 London	Team
World Championships
Gold medal – first place	2009 Rome	Routine combination
Silver medal – second place	2009 Rome	Team technical
Silver medal – second place	2009 Rome	Team free
Silver medal – second place	2013 Barcelona	Team technical
Silver medal – second place	2013 Barcelona	Team free
Silver medal – second place	2013 Barcelona	Routine combination
Bronze medal – third place	2011 Shanghai	Team technical
Bronze medal – third place	2011 Shanghai	Team free
Bronze medal – third place	2013 Barcelona	Duet technical
Bronze medal – third place	2013 Barcelona	Duet free
European Championships
Gold medal – first place	2012 Eindhoven	Team free
Gold medal – first place	2012 Eindhoven	Routine combination
Silver medal – second place	2010 Budapest	Team free
Silver medal – second place	2010 Budapest	Routine combination
Silver medal – second place	2014 Berlin	Combination routine
Bronze medal – third place	2014 Berlin	Team routine

Margalida Crespí Jaume (Note: In this Spanish name, the first or paternal surname is Crespí and the second or maternal family name is Jaume.) (born 15 August 1990) is a Spanish competitor in synchronized swimming. She won a bronze medal in the team competition at the 2012 Summer Olympics.
