= Alice Nesti =

Italian swimmer

Personal information
- Born: July 18, 1989 (age 36) Pistoia, Italy

Sport
- Sport: Swimming
Medal record
Representing Italy
European Championships
Gold medal – first place	2012 Debrecen	4x200m freestyle relay

Alice Nesti (born 18 July 1989) is an Italian swimmer. He competed in the 4 × 200 metre freestyle relay event at the 2012 Summer Olympics. At the 2012 European Aquatics Championships Nesti and her teammates won the gold in the 4 x 200 metre freestyle relay.
