= Cecilia Jiménez =

Spanish Synchronised swimmer (born 1995)

Personal information
- Nationality: Spanish
- Born: 27 July 1995 (age 30)

Sport
- Country: Spain
- Sport: Synchronised swimming
Medal record
World Championships
Bronze medal – third place	2019 Gwangju	Highlight routine

Cecilia Jiménez (born 27 July 1995) is a Spanish Synchronised swimmer.

She participated at the 2019 World Aquatics Championships, winning a medal.
