= Žana Jereb =

Slovenian long-distance runner

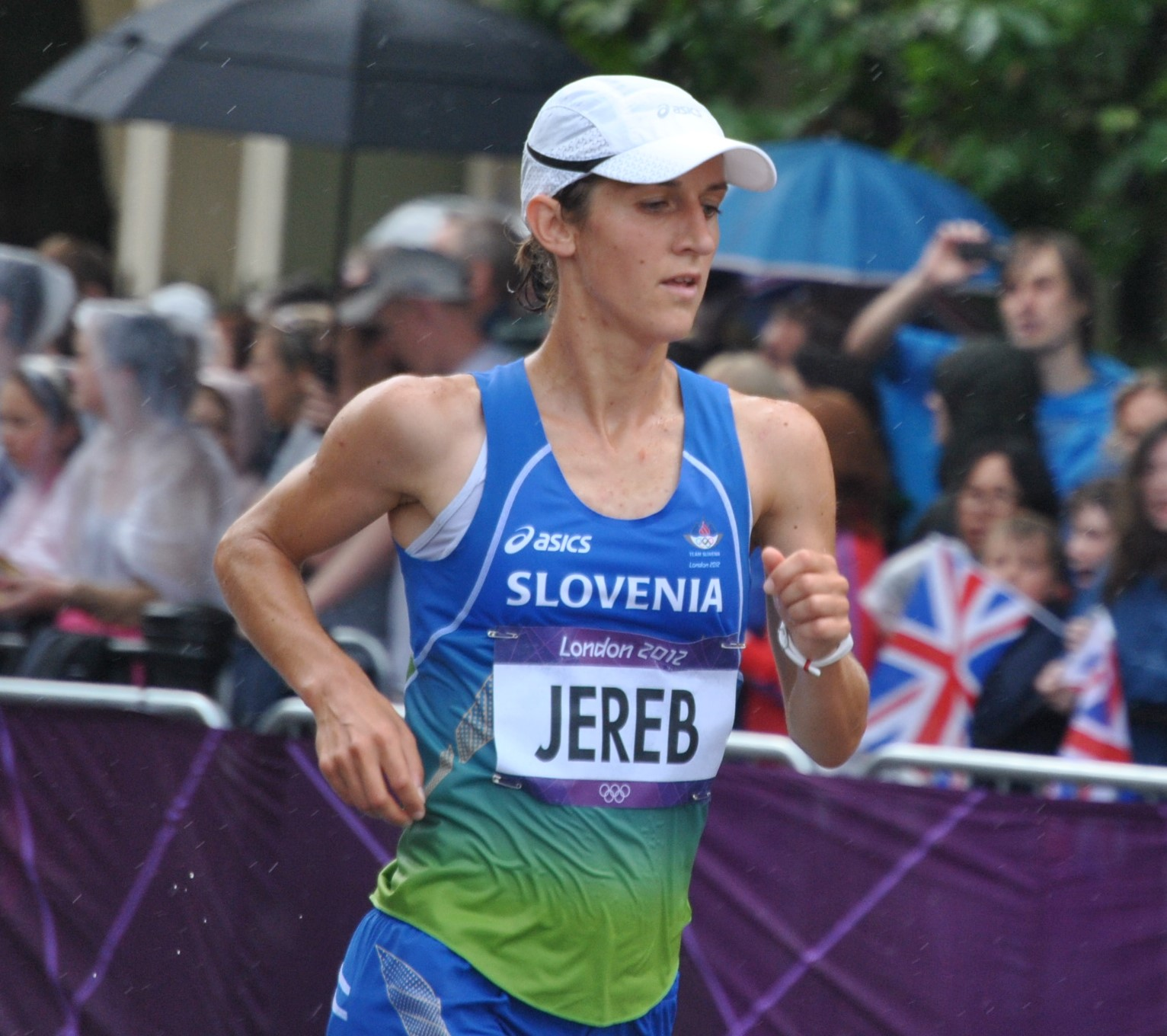

Personal information
- Born: June 17, 1984 (age 41)
- Height: 1.72 m (5 ft 8 in)
- Weight: 56 kg (123 lb)

Sport
- Country: Slovenia
- Sport: Athletics
- Event: Marathon

Žana Jereb (born 17 June 1984 in Kranj) is a Slovenian long-distance runner. She competed in the marathon at the 2012 Summer Olympics, placing 88th with a time of 2:42:50.
