= Albert Puig (swimmer) =

Spanish swimmer

Personal information
- Full name: Albert Puig Garrich
- Nationality: Spanish
- Born: 1 April 1994 (age 32) Terrassa, Barcelona, Spain
- Height: 184 cm (6 ft 0 in)
- Weight: 78 kg (172 lb)

Sport
- Sport: Swimming

Albert Puig Garrich (Note: In this Spanish name, the first or paternal surname is Puig and the second or maternal family name is Garrich.) (born 1 April 1994) is a Spanish swimmer. He competed in the men's 4 × 200 metre freestyle relay event at the 2016 Summer Olympics.
