= Mojca Sagmeister =

Slovenian swimmer

Medal record

Women's Swimming

Representing Slovenia

European Aquatics Championships
Bronze medal – third place	2012 Debrecen	4×200 m freestyle

Mediterranean Games
Silver medal – second place	2013 Mersin	200 m freestyle
Bronze medal – third place	2013 Mersin	4x200 m freestyle

Mojca Sagmeister (born 6 March 1996 in Slovenj Gradec) is a Slovenian swimmer. She competed at the 2012 Summer Olympics in the Women's 400 metre freestyle, finishing 32nd in the heats, failing to qualify for the final.
