= Víctor Martín (swimmer) =

Spanish swimmer

Personal information
- Full name: Víctor Manuel Martín Martín
- Nationality: Spanish
- Born: 25 September 1993 (age 32)

Sport
- Sport: Swimming

Víctor Manuel Martín Martín (born 25 September 1993) is a Spanish swimmer. He competed in the men's 4 × 200 metre freestyle relay event at the 2016 Summer Olympics.
