= Cristina Salvador =

Spanish synchronized swimmer

Personal information
- Full name: Cristina Salvador González
- Born: 26 September 1991 (age 34) Spain
- Height: 1.72 m (5 ft 8 in)

Sport
- Country: Spain
- Sport: Synchronized swimming
Medal record
World Championships
Silver medal – second place	2009 Rome	Team Technical Routine
Bronze medal – third place	2011 Shanghai	Team Technical Routine
Silver medal – second place	2013 Barcelona	Team Technical Routine
Silver medal – second place	2013 Barcelona	Team Free Routine
Silver medal – second place	2013 Barcelona	Free Routine Combination
European Championships
Silver medal – second place	2014 Berlin	Combination Routine
Bronze medal – third place	2014 Berlin	Team Routine
Bronze medal – third place	2016 London	Team free routine

Cristina Salvador González (Note: In this Spanish name, the first or paternal surname is Salvador and the second or maternal family name is González.) (born 26 September 1991) is a Spanish competitor in synchronized swimming.

She won three silver medals at the 2013 World Aquatics Championships, a bronze at the 2011 World Aquatics Championships, and a silver at the 2009 World Aquatics Championships. She also won a silver and a bronze at the 2014 European Aquatics Championships.
