= Urša Bežan =

Slovenian swimmer (born 1994)

Personal information
- Born: May 24, 1994 (age 32) Kranj, Slovenia

Sport
- Sport: Swimming
Medal record
Representing Slovenia
European Championships
| Bronze medal – third place | 2012 Debrecen | 4x200m freestyle relay |

Urša Bežan (born 24 May 1994) is a Slovenian swimmer. She competed in the 4 × 200 metre freestyle relay event at the 2012 Summer Olympics.
