= Melani Costa =

Spanish swimmer (born 1989)

Personal information
- Full name: Melania Felicitas Costa Schmid
- National team: Spain
- Born: 24 April 1989 (age 37) Palma de Mallorca, Spain
- Height: 1.80 m (5 ft 11 in)
- Weight: 70 kg (154 lb)

Sport
- Sport: Swimming
- Strokes: Freestyle
- Club: Club de Natación La Salle
- College team: University of Florida (U.S.)
Medal record
Women's swimming
Representing Spain
World Championships (LC)
Silver medal – second place	2013 Barcelona	400 m freestyle
World Championships (SC)
Gold medal – first place	2012 Istanbul	400 m freestyle
Bronze medal – third place	2012 Istanbul	200 m freestyle
European Championships (LC)
Silver medal – second place	2016 London	4×200 m freestyle
European Championships (SC)
Silver medal – second place	2010 Eindhoven	400 m freestyle
Silver medal – second place	2011 Szczecin	200 m freestyle
Bronze medal – third place	2011 Szczecin	400 m freestyle
Bronze medal – third place	2011 Szczecin	800 m freestyle
Mediterranean Games
Silver medal – second place	2018 Tarragona	200 m freestyle
Bronze medal – third place	2018 Tarragona	4x100 m freestyle
Bronze medal – third place	2018 Tarragona	4x200 m freestyle
Universiade
Gold medal – first place	2011 Shenzhen	200 m freestyle
Silver medal – second place	2011 Shenzhen	400 m freestyle
Silver medal – second place	2011 Shenzhen	1500 m freestyle
Bronze medal – third place	2011 Shenzhen	800 m freestyle

Melania Felicitas Costa Schmid, (born 24 April 1989), also known as Melani Costa, is a Spanish competition swimmer.

She competed in the 2008 Summer Olympics in the 200 m and the 4 × 200 m freestyle. At the 2012 Summer Olympics in the women's 400 metre freestyle, finishing 9th in the heats, failing to qualify for the final. She also competed in the women's 200 metre freestyle, finishing 9th in semifinal, failing to qualify for the final. She also competed in the 4 × 200 m freestyle, finishing in 10th, and the 4 × 100 m medley relay, finishing in 13th. At the 2016 Olympics, she again competed in the 200 m and 400 m freestyle, finishing in 19th and 17th respectively. She also competed in the 4 × 100 m freestyle and 4 × 200 m freestyle, finishing in 13th and 16th.

She won six medals in FINA World Swimming Championships (25 m), including a gold medal. She is also silver medalist in the FINA World Aquatics Championships.
